= Billy Joel discography =

- Billy Joel performing at Hyde Park in 2023
- Studio albums: 13
- Live albums: 8
- Compilation albums: 19
- Singles: 82
- Video albums: 14
- Music videos: 45
- Promotional singles: 3

American singer-songwriter Billy Joel has released 13 studio albums, eight live albums, 19 compilation albums, 14 video albums, 82 singles, three promotional singles and 45 music videos.

Joel's debut solo album, Cold Spring Harbor, was released in November 1971 and sold poorly, also containing a mastering error. Joel reemerged in the music industry two years later, with breakthrough album Piano Man and a new contract with Columbia Records. However, his next two albums (Streetlife Serenade and Turnstiles) did not sell to Columbia's expectations, prompting them to consider dropping Joel. However, his next album, The Stranger, released in September 1977, was a huge success, to this day remaining his best-selling studio album release, achieving 12× Platinum (Diamond status) in the US as well. His success increased with further albums such as 52nd Street, Glass Houses, The Nylon Curtain, and An Innocent Man. Joel's 1985 compilation album Greatest Hits – Volume I & Volume II is the 2nd best-selling album by a solo artist in RIAA history, achieving 23× Platinum certification in the US (behind Thriller by Michael Jackson). Joel's last rock album to date, River of Dreams, was released in 1993. His final studio album is Fantasies & Delusions, an album compiled of classical music. Joel himself does not perform on the album, though the music is composed by him. In July 2025, the two-part documentary retrospective Billy Joel: And So It Goes was released and paired with an extensive companion soundtrack.

Throughout his career, he has sold more than 150 million records worldwide, making him one of the best-selling music artists in history. According to Recording Industry Association of America, Joel has sold 85 million certified albums in the United States, making him the 4th best-selling solo artist of all time (behind Garth Brooks, Elvis Presley and Michael Jackson). Billboard ranked him as the 9th Greatest male soloist of all time (19th overall).

== Albums ==
=== Studio albums ===
List of albums, with selected chart positions and certifications
Title	Album details	Peak chart positions										Certifications
Title	Album details	US	AUS	AUT	CAN	GER	JPN	NLD	NOR	NZ	UK	Certifications
Cold Spring Harbor	Released: November 1, 1971; Label: Family Productions; Formats: CS, 8T, LP	158 (Note: Cold Spring Harbor originally peaked at number 202 on the Billboard Bubbling Under the Top LP's chart in 1972. The album was re-issued by Columbia in December 1983. All chart positions listed for Cold Spring Harbor are for its 1983 re-issue.)	—	—	—	—	44	—	—	—	95	
Piano Man	Released: November 14, 1973; Label: Columbia; Formats: CS, 8T, LP	27	14	—	26	—	112	—	—	—	98 (Note: Piano Man entered the UK Albums Chart following a 1984 re-issue.)	RIAA: 5× Platinum; ARIA: Platinum; MC: 2× Platinum
Streetlife Serenade	Released: October 11, 1974; Label: Columbia; Formats: CS, 8T, LP	35	85	—	16	—	—	—	—	—	—	RIAA: Platinum
Turnstiles	Released: May 19, 1976; Label: Columbia; Formats: CS, 8T, LP	122	12	—	—	—	286 (Note: Turnstiles entered the Japanese Oricon Albums Chart following a 2004 re-issue.)	—	—	—	—	RIAA: Platinum; ARIA: Gold
The Stranger	Released: September 29, 1977; Label: Columbia; Formats: CS, 8T, LP	2	2	—	2	—	3	36	—	2	24	RIAA: Diamond (12× Platinum); ARIA: Platinum; BPI: Gold; RIAJ: Gold; MC: 5× Platinum
52nd Street	Released: October 11, 1978; Label: Columbia; Formats: CS, 8T, LP	1	1	4	1	19	9	33	5	1	10	RIAA: 7× Platinum; ARIA: 2× Platinum; BPI: Gold; MC: 4× Platinum; RIAJ: Gold; RMNZ: Platinum
Glass Houses	Released: March 12, 1980; Label: Columbia; Formats: CS, 8T, LP	1	2	4	1	24	6	20	2	6	9	RIAA: 7× Platinum; AUS: Platinum; BPI: Gold; MC: 5× Platinum
The Nylon Curtain	Released: September 23, 1982; Label: Columbia; Formats: CS, 8T, LP	7	4	20	12	34	2	1	9	10	27	RIAA: 2× Platinum; ARIA: Platinum; MC: Platinum
An Innocent Man	Released: August 8, 1983; Label: Columbia; Formats: CS, 8T, LP	4	3	—	12	36	3	14	9	1	2	RIAA: 8× Platinum; ARIA: Gold; BPI: 3× Platinum; MC: 3× Platinum
The Bridge	Released: July 25, 1986; Label: Columbia; Formats: CD, CS, 8T, LP	7	2	18	10	34	2	20	13	12	38	RIAA: 2× Platinum; BPI: Silver; MC: 2× Platinum
Storm Front	Released: October 17, 1989; Label: Columbia; Formats: CD, CS, LP	1	1	10	4	5	8	14	—	9	5	RIAA: 4× Platinum; ARIA: 2× Platinum; RIAJ: Platinum; BPI: Platinum; BVMI: Platinum; IFPI AUT: Gold; MC: 2× Platinum
River of Dreams	Released: August 10, 1993; Label: Columbia; Formats: CD, CS, LP	1	1	2	6	2	3	23	9	1	3	RIAA: 5× Platinum; ARIA: 3× Platinum; RIAJ: Platinum; BPI: Platinum; BVMI: Platinum; IFPI AUT: Platinum; MC: 3× Platinum; RMNZ: Platinum
Fantasies & Delusions	Released: September 27, 2001; Label: Columbia, Sony Classical; Formats: CD, download	83	—	—	—	—	—	—	—	—	—	
"—" denotes releases that did not chart or were not released in that territory.

=== Live albums ===
List of albums, with selected chart positions and certifications
Title	Album details	Peak chart positions										Certifications
Title	Album details	US	AUS	AUT	GER	JPN	NLD	NOR	NZ	SWE	UK	Certifications
Songs in the Attic	Released: September 14, 1981; Label: Columbia; Formats: CS, 8T, LP	8	9	—	51	3	—	12	30	38	57	RIAA: 3× Platinum
Kohuept	Released: October 26, 1987; Label: Columbia; Formats: CD, CS, LP, 8T	38	10	—	—	16	39	—	13	—	92	RIAA: Platinum
2000 Years: The Millennium Concert	Released: May 2, 2000; Label: Columbia; Formats: CS, CD, download	40	—	—	64	17	—	—	—	—	68	RIAA: Gold
12 Gardens Live	Released: June 13, 2006; Label: Columbia; Formats: CD, download	14	22	11	80	52	—	—	—	—	95	
Live at Shea Stadium: The Concert	Released: March 8, 2011; Label: Sony; Formats: CD, Aload	35	—	—	41	41	—	—	—	—	—	
A Matter of Trust: The Bridge to Russia (expanded version of Kohuept)	Released: May 19, 2014; Label: Columbia Records; Formats: 2CD, 2CD + DVD, 2CD + Blu-Ray, DVD	—	—	—	—	—	—	—	—	—	—	
Live at Carnegie Hall 1977	Released: April 13, 2019; Label: Legacy; Formats: LP	—	—	—	—	—	—	—	—	—	—	
Live at the Great American Music Hall 1975	Released: April 23, 2023; Label: Columbia; Formats: 2×LP (RSD limited edition)	—	—	—	—	—	—	—	—	—	—	
"—" denotes releases that did not chart or were not released in that territory.

=== Compilation albums ===
List of albums, with selected chart positions and certifications
Title	Album details	Peak chart positions										Certifications
Title	Album details	US	AUS	AUT	GER	JPN	NLD	NOR	NZ	SWE	UK	Certifications
Billy Joel: The Box Set	Released: 1980; Label: Columbia; Formats: 12" box set	—	—	—	—	—	—	—	45	—	—	
Greatest Hits – Volume I & Volume II	Released: July 1, 1985; Label: Columbia; Formats: CD, CS, 8T, LP	6	2	30	33	4	7	1 (Note: Greatest Hits Volume I and II originally peaked at number 18 on the Norwegian Albums Chart before peaking at number 1 in 1994.)	1	45	7	RIAA: 23× Platinum; ARIA: 9× Platinum; RIAJ: 3× Platinum+Gold; BPI: Platinum; IFPI AUT: Gold; IFPI NOR: Platinum; MC: 2× Platinum
Starbox	Released: 1988; Label: Columbia; Formats: CD	—	—	—	—	20	—	—	—	—	—	
Souvenir: The Ultimate Collection	Released: January 1990; Label: Columbia; Formats: CD, CS	—	1	—	—	—	—	—	—	—	—	ARIA: Platinum
A Voyage on the River of Dreams	Released: 1994; Label: Columbia; Formats: CD	—	33	—	—	70	—	—	47	—	—	
Greatest Hits Volume III	Released: August 19, 1997; Label: Columbia; Formats: CD, CS, LP	9	12	7	23	15	18	7	18	—	23	RIAA: Platinum; RIAJ: Gold; ARIA: Gold; BPI: Silver
The Complete Hits Collection: 1973–1997	Released: October 13, 1997; Label: Columbia; Formats: CD, CS, LP	—	20	—	—	—	—	—	17	—	33	RIAA: 2× Platinum
The Ultimate Collection	Released: December 20, 2000; Label: Columbia; Formats: CD, LP	—	12	—	58	19 (Note: The Ultimate Collection originally peaked at number 21 on the Japanese Oricon Albums Chart before peaking at number 19 in 2007.)	36	3	2	3	4	ARIA: 2× Platinum; BPI: Platinum; IFPI NOR: Gold; IFPI SWE: Gold; RIAJ: Platinum
The Essential Billy Joel	Released: October 2, 2001; Label: Sony; Formats: CD	15 (Note: The Essential Billy Joel entered the Australian ARIA Albums Chart and the RIANZ Albums Chart following a 2008 reissue entitled The Essential 3.0.)	50	—	—	—	—	—	14	—	157	RIAA: 4× Platinum; ARIA: 3× Platinum; BPI: Gold; RMNZ: Platinum
Piano Man: The Very Best of Billy Joel	Released: November 15, 2004; Label: Columbia; Formats: CD, download	—	14	15	93	17	—	—	13	—	7 (Note: Piano Man: The Very Best of Billy Joel originally peaked at number 40 on the UK Albums Chart before peaking at number 7 in 2010.)	ARIA: Platinum; BPI: 6× Platinum; RIAJ: Platinum
My Lives	Released: November 22, 2005; Label: Sony; Formats: CD box set	171	—	—	—	175	—	—	—	—	—	
The Hits	Released: November 16, 2010; Label: Sony; Formats: CD, download	34	—	—	—	—	—	—	—	—	—	RIAA: Gold
She's Always a Woman: Love Songs	Released: November 23, 2010; Label: Sony; Formats: CD	—	—	—	—	113	—	—	—	—	—	
Billy Joel: The Complete Albums Collection	Released: November 8, 2011; Label: Sony; Formats: CD box set	—	—	—	—	—	—	—	—	—	—	
Collected Additional Masters	Released: November 8, 2011; Label: Sony; Formats: CD, streaming	—	—	—	—	—	—	—	—	—	—	
Opus Collection	Released: March 20, 2012; Label: Starbucks; Formats: CD	80	—	—	—	—	—	—	—	—	—	
She's Got a Way: Love Songs	Released: January 22, 2013; Label: Legacy; Formats: CD	—	—	—	—	—	—	—	—	—	—	
50 Years of the Piano Man	Released: April 8, 2022; Label: Columbia; Formats: Digital	—	—	—	—	—	—	—	—	—	—	
Billy Joel: And So It Goes	Released: July 26, 2025; Label: Columbia; Formats: Streaming	—	—	—	—	—	—	—	—	—	—	
"—" denotes releases that did not chart or were not released in that territory.

=== Video albums ===
List of video albums, with selected chart positions and certifications
Title	Album details	Peak chart positions	Certifications
Title	Album details	US Video	Certifications
Live from Long Island	Released: 1983; Label: CBS; Formats: VHS		
The Video Album – Volume I	Released: 1986; Label: CBS; Formats: LaserDisc, VHS	2	RIAA: Gold
The Video Album – Volume II	Released: 1986; Label: CBS; Formats: LaserDisc, VHS	4	RIAA: Gold
Eye of the Storm	Released: May 15, 1990; Label: CBS; Formats: LaserDisc, VHS	16	RIAA: Gold
Live at Yankee Stadium	Released: November 21, 1990; Label: Sony; Formats: VHS	15	RIAA: Platinum
Greatest Hits Volume III: The Video	Released: October 13, 1997; Label: Columbia; Formats: LaserDisc, VHS, DVD	24	RIAA: Gold
The Essential Video Collection	Released: November 20, 2001; Label: Sony; Formats: VHS, DVD	17	
The Ultimate Collection	Released: 2001; Label: Sony Music Video Enterprises; Formats: DVD		ARIA: 5× Platinum; BPI: Gold; RIANZ: Platinum
Piano Man: The Very Best of Billy Joel	Released: November 15, 2004; Label: Columbia; Formats: DVD	—	
My Lives	Released: November 22, 2005; Label: Sony; Formats: DVD	—	
Live from the River of Dreams	Released: 2007; Label: Columbia; Formats: DVD	—	ARIA: Gold
The Essential 3.0	Released: August 26, 2008; Label: Sony; Formats: DVD	—	
Live at Shea Stadium: The Concert	Released: March 8, 2011; Label: Sony; Formats: DVD	1	ARIA: 2× Platinum
Billy Joel: And So It Goes	Released: July 18 & 25, 2025; Label: HBO; Formats: Streaming	—	
"—" denotes releases that did not chart or were not released in that territory.

== Singles ==
List of singles, with selected chart positions and certifications, showing year released and album name
Title	Year	Peak chart positions										Certifications	Album
Title	Year	US	AUS	AUT	CAN	GER	IRE	NLD	NOR	NZ	UK	Certifications	Album
"She's Got a Way"	1971	—	—	—	—	—	—	—	—	—	—		Cold Spring Harbor
"Tomorrow Is Today"	1972	—	—	—	—	—	—	—	—	—	—		Cold Spring Harbor
"Piano Man"	1973	25	20	—	10	—	—	56	—	—	136	RIAA: 8× Platinum; BPI: 3× Platinum; BVMI: Gold; RMNZ: 7× Platinum	Piano Man
"Worse Comes to Worst"	1974	80	—	—	62	—	—	—	—	—	—		Piano Man
"Travelin' Prayer"	1974	77	—	—	61	—	—	—	—	—	—		Piano Man
"The Ballad of Billy the Kid"	1974	—	—	—	—	—	—	—	—	—	—		Piano Man
"The Entertainer"	1974	34	89	—	30	—	—	—	—	—	—		Streetlife Serenade
"Say Goodbye to Hollywood"	1976	—	45	—	—	—	—	—	—	—	—		Turnstiles
"James"	1976	—	77	—	—	—	—	16	—	—	—		Turnstiles
"Just the Way You Are"	1977	3	6	—	2	—	7	—	—	6	19	RIAA: 3× Platinum; BPI: Gold; RMNZ: Platinum	The Stranger
"Movin' Out (Anthony's Song)"	1977	17	99	—	11	—	24	—	—	11	35	RIAA: 2× Platinum; BPI: Silver; RMNZ: Gold	The Stranger
"Only the Good Die Young"	1978	24	—	—	18	—	—	—	—	—	—	RIAA: 3× Platinum; RMNZ: Platinum	The Stranger
"She's Always a Woman"	1978	17	—	37	12	—	22	15	—	14	29 (Note: "She's Always a Woman" peaked at number 53 on the UK Singles Chart in 1986 following a double A-side single re-release with "Just the Way You Are". It reentered the chart in 2010 and reached a new peak of 29.)	RIAA: 2× Platinum; BPI: 2× Platinum; RMNZ: 2× Platinum	The Stranger
"The Stranger"	1978	—	59	—	—	—	—	—	—	8	—	RIAA: Gold	The Stranger
"My Life"	1978	3	6	11	3	—	3	22	—	6	12	RIAA: 3× Platinum; BPI: Silver; RMNZ: 2× Platinum	52nd Street
"Big Shot"	1979	14	91	—	13	—	—	—	—	36	—	RIAA: Gold	52nd Street
"Honesty"	1979	24	80	—	16	—	—	31	—	38	—	RIAA: Gold	52nd Street
"Until the Night"	1979	—	—	—	—	—	—	—	—	—	50		52nd Street
"All for Leyna"	1980	—	—	—	—	—	—	—	—	—	40		Glass Houses
"You May Be Right"	1980	7	28	—	6	—	—	—	—	23	—	RIAA: Platinum; RMNZ: Gold	Glass Houses
"It's Still Rock and Roll to Me"	1980	1	10	—	1	—	11	—	—	21	14	RIAA: 4× Platinum; RMNZ: Platinum	Glass Houses
"Don't Ask Me Why"	1980	19	—	—	4	—	—	42	—	—	—	RIAA: Gold	Glass Houses
"Sometimes a Fantasy"	1980	36	—	—	21	—	—	—	—	—	—		Glass Houses
"Say Goodbye to Hollywood" (Live)	1981	17	—	—	27	—	—	—	—	—	—		Songs in the Attic
"You're My Home" (Live)	1981	—	100	—	—	—	—	—	—	—	—		Songs in the Attic
"She's Got a Way" (Live)	1981	23	—	—	46	—	—	—	—	—	—		Songs in the Attic
"Pressure"	1982	20	16	—	9	—	—	—	—	24	—	RIAA: Gold	The Nylon Curtain
"Allentown"	1982	17	49	—	21	—	—	—	—	37	—	RIAA: Gold	The Nylon Curtain
"Goodnight Saigon"	1983	56	—	—	—	—	19	1	—	—	29 (Note: In the United Kingdom, "Goodnight Saigon" and "Leave a Tender Moment Alone" were released as a double A-side single.)		The Nylon Curtain
"Tell Her About It"	1983	1	9	—	5	—	2	39	—	12	4	RIAA: Platinum; BPI: Silver	An Innocent Man
"Uptown Girl"	1983	3	1	18	4	18	1	10	3	1	1	RIAA: 6× Platinum; BPI: 3× Platinum; BVMI: Gold; RMNZ: 6× Platinum	An Innocent Man
"An Innocent Man"	1983	10	23	—	16	—	3	—	—	24	8	BPI: Silver	An Innocent Man
"The Longest Time"	1984	14	15	—	36	—	18	—	—	24	25	RIAA: 2× Platinum; BPI: Silver; RMNZ: Gold	An Innocent Man
"Leave a Tender Moment Alone"	1984	27	76	—	58	—	16	—	—	21	29		An Innocent Man
"This Night"	1984	—	—	—	—	—	—	—	—	—	78		An Innocent Man
"Keeping the Faith"	1984	18	—	—	81	—	—	—	—	38	—		An Innocent Man
"You're Only Human (Second Wind)"	1985	9	6	—	15	—	—	22	—	8	94		Greatest Hits – Volume I & Volume II
"The Night Is Still Young"	1985	34	82	—	48	—	—	—	—	—	146		Greatest Hits – Volume I & Volume II
"Modern Woman"	1986	10	21	—	27	—	—	—	—	28	136		The Bridge
"A Matter of Trust"	1986	10	3	—	15	—	—	—	—	16	52	RIAA: Gold	The Bridge
"This Is the Time"	1986	18	73	—	26	—	—	—	—	12	181		The Bridge
"Baby Grand" (with Ray Charles)	1987	75	78	—	—	—	—	—	—	—	—		The Bridge
"Back in the U.S.S.R." (Live)	1987	—	33	—	—	—	—	96	—	41	140		Концерт
"We Didn't Start the Fire"	1989	1	2	7	2	4	3	11	—	1	7	RIAA: 6× Platinum; ARIA: Platinum; BPI: 2× Platinum; RMNZ: 3× Platinum	Storm Front
"Leningrad"	1989	—	—	—	—	14	—	15	—	—	53		Storm Front
"I Go to Extremes"	1990	6	48	—	3	36	29	43	—	45	70		Storm Front
"The Downeaster 'Alexa'"	1990	57	126	—	25	—	—	—	—	24	76	RIAA: Gold	Storm Front
"That's Not Her Style"	1990	77	—	—	—	—	—	—	—	—	97		Storm Front
"And So It Goes"	1990	37	108	—	30	—	—	—	—	24	—	RIAA: Gold	Storm Front
"Shameless"	1991	—	133	—	—	—	—	—	—	—	—		Storm Front
"All Shook Up"	1992	92	54	—	28	52	23	—	—	26	27		Honeymoon in Vegas soundtrack
"The River of Dreams"	1993	3	1	2	2	4	2	5	8	1	3	ARIA: Platinum; BPI: Silver; RIAA: Platinum; RMNZ: Platinum; SNEP: Gold	River of Dreams
"All About Soul"	1993	29	34	—	9	51	—	42	—	12	32		River of Dreams
"No Man's Land"	1993	—	—	—	71	—	—	—	—	24	50		River of Dreams
"Lullabye (Goodnight, My Angel)"	1994	77	—	—	27	—	—	—	—	43	—	RIAA: Platinum	River of Dreams
"Hard Day's Night" (Live)	1994	—	85	—	—	—	—	—	—	—	—		A Voyage on the River of Dreams
"To Make You Feel My Love"	1997	50	90	—	—	—	—	99	—	—	—		Greatest Hits Volume III
"Hey Girl"	1997	—	—	—	—	—	—	—	—	—	—		Greatest Hits Volume III
"New York State of Mind" (with Tony Bennett)	2001	—	—	—	—	—	—	—	—	—	—	RIAA: Platinum; BPI: Silver	Playin' with My Friends: Bennett Sings the Blues
"All My Life"	2007	—	—	—	—	—	—	—	—	—	—		Non-album single
"Christmas in Fallujah" (featuring Cass Dillon)	2007	—	—	—	—	—	—	—	—	—	—		A Good Thing Never Dies (EP by Cass Dillon)
"Christmas in Fallujah" (Live in Sydney, Australia, 2008)	2007	—	46	—	—	—	—	—	—	—	—		Non-album single and download
"Turn the Lights Back On"	2024	62	—	—	—	—	—	—	—	—	— (Note: "Turn the Lights Back On" did not enter the UK Singles Chart Top 100 but debuted at number 36 on the UK Singles Downloads Chart Top 100.)		Non-album single
"—" denotes releases that did not chart or were not released in that territory. "x" denotes that the chart did not exist at the time.

Other singles:

- "She's Got a Way" B-side: "Everybody Loves You Now/You Can Make Me Free" (1971–72)
- "You Can Make Me Free" B-side: "You Look So Good to Me" Philips 6078 005
- "Tomorrow Is Today" B-side: "Everybody Loves You Now" (1972) FPS-0906
- "Nocturne" B-side: "Tomorrow Is Today" (Dutch promo single) (1972)
- "Why Judy Why" B-side: "Nocturne" (Australian-only single) (1972)
- "Root Beer Rag" B-side: "Roberta" (Dutch promo single) (1975)
- "If I Only Had the Words (To Tell You)" B-side: "Stop in Nevada" (UK promo single) (1975)
- "I've Loved These Days" B-side: "Say Goodbye to Hollywood" (US-only single) (1976)
- "Everybody Has a Dream" B-side: "Vienna" (Dutch-only single) (1978)
- "Nobody Knows But Me" B-side of "Santa Claus Is Coming to Town" by Bruce Springsteen (US promo single) CBS PRO151, from In Harmony 2 LP (1981)
- "C'était toi (You Were the One)" B-side "Close To The Borderline" (French-only single) (1980)
- "Los Angelenos" (live) B-side: "She's Got a Way" (live) (Japanese-only single) (1981) Columbia 3-10562
- "She's Right on Time" B-side: "A Room of Our Own" (Dutch promo single) (1983)
- "Temptation" B-side: "The Night Is Still Young" (Australian single) (1987)
- "The Times They Are A-Changin'" (live) B-side (live) [tracks recorded in the USSR] released in USA, Canada, Australia (1987)
- "Shout" live at Yankee Stadium (Australian & Austrian single) (1990) with 4 other tracks live at Yankee Stadium on CD/Cassette
- "Storm Front" live at Yankee Stadium (Australian-only single) (1991) B-side: "Storm Front" (LP version)
- "When You Wish Upon a Star" (Japanese promo single) (1991)
- "Shades of Grey" (US promo single) (1993)

== Other charted or certified songs ==
List of songs, with selected chart positions, showing year released and album name
Title	Year	Peak chart positions	Certifications	Album
Title	Year	US Main. Rock	Certifications	Album
"Captain Jack"	1973	—	RIAA: Gold	Piano Man
"Scenes from an Italian Restaurant"	1977	—	RIAA: Platinum	The Stranger
"Vienna"	1977	—	RIAA: 3× Platinum; BPI: 2× Platinum; RMNZ: 3× Platinum	The Stranger
"Scandinavian Skies"	1982	38		The Nylon Curtain
"A Room of Our Own"	1982	27		The Nylon Curtain

== Guest appearances and other contributions ==
List of (mostly non-single) guest appearances with other performing artists and contributions to movie soundtracks with new recordings
Title	Year	Other artist(s)	Album
"Talkin' Bout My Baby" backing vocals	1985	Patti Austin	Gettin' Away with Murder
"Be Chrool to Your Scuel" piano	1985	Twisted Sister	Come Out and Play
"You Get What You Want"	1986	Julian Lennon	The Secret Value of Daydreaming
"Modern Woman"	1986	—N/a	Ruthless People: The Original Motion Picture Soundtrack
"Maybe He'll Know" backing vocals	1986	Cyndi Lauper	True Colors
"Why Should I Worry?"	1988	—N/a	Oliver & Company: Original Motion Picture Soundtrack
"Just Wanna Hold" keyboards, vocals	1989	Mick Jones	Mick Jones
"I Get No Sleep" piano	1991	Richard Marx	Rush Street
"When You Wish Upon A Star"	1991	—N/a	Simply Mad About The Mouse
"Heartbreak Hotel"	1992	—N/a	Honeymoon in Vegas: Music from the Original Motion Picture Soundtrack
"In a Sentimental Mood"	1992	—N/a	A League of Their Own: Music from the Motion Picture
"Where Were You (On Our Wedding Day)?"	1999	—N/a	Runaway Bride: Original Motion Picture Soundtrack
"Have Yourself a Merry Little Christmas"	1999	Rosie O'Donnell	A Rosie Christmas
"The Good Life"	2006	Tony Bennett	Duets: An American Classic
"Wichita Lineman"	2010	Jimmy Webb	Just Across the River
"New York State of Mind" (live)	2010	Bruce Springsteen and the E Street Band	25th Anniversary Rock and Roll Hall of Fame Concerts
"Born to Run" (live)	2010	Bruce Springsteen and the E Street Band	25th Anniversary Rock and Roll Hall of Fame Concerts
"(Your Love Keeps Lifting Me) Higher and Higher (A Tribute to Jackie Wilson)" (live)	2010	Bruce Springsteen and the E Street Band, Darlene Love, John Fogerty, Sam Moore, Tom Morello	25th Anniversary Rock and Roll Hall of Fame Concerts
"The Christmas Song (Chestnuts Roasting on an Open Fire)"	2013	Johnny Mathis	Sending You a Little Christmas
"New York State of Mind"	2014	Barbra Streisand	Partners
"Maybe I'm Amazed"	2014	—N/a	The Art of McCartney (tribute album)
"Live and Let Die"	2014	—N/a	The Art of McCartney (tribute album)

== Music videos ==
Year	Title	Director	Notes
1972	"Everybody Loves You Now" [Version 1]	Artie Ripp	originally contained the 1971 studio mix, later 1983 Remix was dubbed in its place.
1973	"Piano Man" [version 1]	Jon Small	Alternate sound track; second video released in 1985
1977	"Just the Way You Are" [live]	Unknown	Live at Live at KZEW, McFarlin Auditorium Texas
1978	"The Stranger" [live]	Unknown	Live at Live at KZEW, McFarlin Auditorium Texas
1978	"Stiletto" / "My Life"	Steve Cohen	
1979	"Big Shot"	Michael Negrin & Steve Cohen	
1979	"Honesty"	Steve Cohen	
1980	"All for Leyna"	Steve Cohen	Alternate vocal track
1980	"It's Still Rock and Roll to Me"	Steve Cohen	
1980	"You May Be Right"	Steve Cohen	Alternate vocal track
1980	"Sometimes a Fantasy"	George Gomes	Alternate vocal track
1981	"Everybody Loves You Now" [live]	Steve Cohen	Live at Sparks, different version from live LP Songs in the Attic
1981	"You're My Home" [live]	Steve Cohen	Live at Sparks, different version from live LP Songs in the Attic
1981	"Los Angelenos" [live]	Steve Cohen	Live at Sparks, different version from live LP Songs in the Attic
1981	"Say Goodbye to Hollywood" [live]	Steve Cohen	Live at Sparks, different version from live LP Songs in the Attic
1981	"She's Got a Way" [live]	Unknown	Live at A&R Studios, different version from live LP Songs in the Attic
1982	"Pressure"	Russell Mulcahy	
1982	"She's Right on Time"	Russell Mulcahy	
1982	"Allentown"	Russell Mulcahy	
1982	"Goodnight Saigon" [version 1, Studio Version]	unknown	Video featured young boys Playing with plastic soldiers while Vietnam War footage was playing on a TV set beside them. The video was quickly pulled from rotation due to complaints from Vietnam vets over the content of the video, replaced by the Live video below.|
1983	"Goodnight Saigon" [Version 2, live]	Jay Dubin	Live at Nassau Veterans Memorial Coliseum
1983	"Tell Her About It"	Jay Dubin	
1983	"Uptown Girl"	Jay Dubin	
1984	"The Longest Time"	Jay Dubin	
1984	"Keeping the Faith"	Howie Deutch	
1985	"You're Only Human (Second Wind)"	Richard Friedman	
1985	"The Night Is Still Young"	Neil Tardio	
1985	"Piano Man" [version 2]	Jon Small	A different version with new extras, same as original video
1986	"A Matter of Trust"	Russell Mulcahy	
1987	"Baby Grand" (with Ray Charles)	Jon Small	
1987	"Back in the U.S.S.R." [live]	Wayne Isham	Live in the Soviet Union
1989	"We Didn't Start the Fire"	Chris Blum	
1989	"Leningrad"	Kathy Dougherty	
1990	"I Go to Extremes"	Paula Greif	
1990	"The Downeaster 'Alexa'"	Andy Morahan	
1990	"That's Not Her Style" [live]	Jon Small	Live at Yankee Stadium
1990	"And So It Goes" [live]	Joel Hinman & Jeff Schock	Live in Linz, Austria
1991	"Shameless" [live]	Derek Horne	
1991	"When You Wish Upon a Star"	Scott Garen	From Disney video Simply Mad About the Mouse
1992	"All Shook Up"	N/A	From soundtrack to film Honeymoon in Vegas
1993	"The River of Dreams"	Andy Morahan	
1993	"All About Soul" [live]	Lawrence Jordan	Live at Boston Garden
1993	"No Man's Land"	Gil Gilbert	
1994	"Lullabye (Goodnight, My Angel)"	Marcus Nispel	
1997	"To Make You Feel My Love"	Ernie Fritz	Alternate vocal track
1997	"Hey Girl"	Ernie Fritz	
2007	"All My Life"	?	
2024	"Turn the Lights Back On"	Warren Fu and Freddy Wrexler	
