= The Ultimate Collection (Billy Joel album) =

Greatest hits album by Billy Joel
- Released: December 20, 2000
- Recorded: 1973–1993
- Genres: Rock; pop
- Length: 153:09
- Label: Sony/Columbia
- Producers: Phil Ramone; Michael Omartian; Billy Joel; Mick Jones; Danny Kortchmar; Joe Nicolo; David Thoener

Billy Joel chronology
| 2000 Years: The Millennium Concert (2000) | The Ultimate Collection (2000) | Fantasies & Delusions (2001) |

Professional ratings
Review scores
| Source | Rating |
|---|---|
| AllMusic | 4.5/5 stars |

The Ultimate Collection is a double-disc compilation album by American singer-songwriter Billy Joel. It was first released by Sony Music Entertainment Japan in December 2000, and subsequently issued in the most of European and Oceanian countries with slightly different track listings (replacing Japanese top-3 charting hit "The Stranger" with live version of "You're My Home").

This career-spanning compilation features some of Joel's early notable compositions and hit singles which were disregarded on his Greatest Hits series, although several hits and fan favorites like "Only the Good Die Young", "Captain Jack", "Vienna", "Scenes from an Italian Restaurant", "Pressure" and "Big Shot" were excluded alternatively. It became a smash hit worldwide, entering top-5 on the charts in many countries, including United Kingdom.

The Ultimate Collection was not issued in the United States, though Legacy Recordings released another similar compilation The Essential in October 2001.

== Track listing ==
All songs written and composed by Billy Joel

=== Disc one ===
| No. | Title | Original album | Length |
|---|---|---|---|
| 1. | "Just the Way You Are" | The Stranger, 1977 | 4:50 |
| 2. | "My Life" | 52nd Street, 1978 | 4:43 |
| 3. | "It's Still Rock and Roll to Me" | Glass Houses, 1980 | 2:57 |
| 4. | "An Innocent Man" | An Innocent Man, 1983 | 5:18 |
| 5. | "Piano Man" | Piano Man, 1973 | 5:37 |
| 6. | "You're My Home" | Piano Man | 3:12 |
| 7. | "Everybody Loves You Now" (Live version) | Songs in the Attic, 1981 | 3:11 |
| 8. | "The Entertainer" | Streetlife Serenade, 1974 | 3:40 |
| 9. | "Streetlife Serenader" | Streetlife Serenade | 5:16 |
| 10. | "New York State of Mind" | Turnstiles, 1976 | 6:03 |
| 11. | "Say Goodbye to Hollywood" | Turnstiles | 4:38 |
| 12. | "She's Got a Way" (Live version) | Songs in the Attic | 3:00 |
| 13. | "Movin' Out (Anthony's Song)" | The Stranger | 3:29 |
| 14. | "She's Always a Woman" | The Stranger | 3:20 |
| 15. | "Honesty" | 52nd Street | 3:49 |
| 16. | "You May Be Right" | Glass Houses | 4:12 |
| 17. | "Don't Ask Me Why" | Glass Houses | 2:57 |
| 18. | "Miami 2017 (Seen the Lights Go Out on Broadway)" (Live version) | Songs in the Attic | 5:09 |

=== Disc two ===
| No. | Title | Original album | Length |
|---|---|---|---|
| 1. | "Uptown Girl" | An Innocent Man | 3:16 |
| 2. | "Tell Her About It" | An Innocent Man | 3:50 |
| 3. | "The River of Dreams" | River of Dreams, 1993 | 4:07 |
| 4. | "The Longest Time" | An Innocent Man | 3:37 |
| 5. | "We Didn't Start the Fire" | Storm Front, 1989 | 4:47 |
| 6. | "Goodnight Saigon" | The Nylon Curtain, 1982 | 7:02 |
| 7. | "Allentown" | The Nylon Curtain | 3:49 |
| 8. | "All for Leyna" | Glass Houses | 4:12 |
| 9. | "This Is the Time" | The Bridge, 1986 | 4:59 |
| 10. | "Leave a Tender Moment Alone" | An Innocent Man | 3:53 |
| 11. | "A Matter of Trust" | The Bridge | 4:08 |
| 12. | "Modern Woman" | The Bridge | 3:50 |
| 13. | "Baby Grand" (Duet with Ray Charles) | The Bridge | 4:04 |
| 14. | "I Go to Extremes" | Storm Front | 4:21 |
| 15. | "Leningrad" | Storm Front | 4:03 |
| 16. | "The Downeaster 'Alexa'" | Storm Front | 3:43 |
| 17. | "You're Only Human (Second Wind)" | Greatest Hits Volume II, 1985 | 4:48 |
| 18. | "All About Soul" (Remix) | Greatest Hits Volume III, 1997 | 5:58 |

== Charts ==
=== Weekly charts ===
2001–2006 weekly chart performance for The Ultimate Collection
| Chart (2001–2006) | Peak position |
|---|---|
| Australian Albums (ARIA) | 12 |
| Australian Music DVD (ARIA) | 9 |
| Danish Albums (Hitlisten) | 2 |
| Dutch Albums (Album Top 100) | 36 |
| French Albums (SNEP) | 12 |
| German Albums (Offizielle Top 100) | 58 |
| Irish Albums (IRMA) | 1 |
| Japanese Albums (Oricon) | 19 |
| New Zealand Albums (RMNZ) | 2 |
| Norwegian Albums (VG-lista) | 3 |
| Swedish Albums (Sverigetopplistan) | 3 |
| UK Albums (Official Charts) | 4 |

=== Year-end charts ===
Year-end chart performance for The Ultimate Collection
| Chart (2001) | Position |
|---|---|
| Australian Albums (ARIA) | 89 |
| Irish Albums (IRMA) | 16 |
| New Zealand Albums (RMNZ) | 16 |
| Swedish Albums (Sverigetopplistan) | 66 |
| UK Albums (OCC) | 36 |

== Certifications ==
=== Album ===
Certifications for The Ultimate Collection
| Region | Certification | Certified units/sales |
|---|---|---|
| Australia (ARIA) | 2× Platinum | 140,000^{^} |
| Japan (RIAJ) | Platinum | 250,000^{^} |
| New Zealand (RMNZ) | 2× Platinum | 30,000^{^} |
| Norway (IFPI Norway) | Gold | 25,000^{*} |
| Sweden (GLF) | Gold | 40,000^{^} |
| United Kingdom (BPI) | Platinum | 300,000^{^} |
^{*} Sales figures based on certification alone.^{^} Shipments figures based on certification alone.

=== Video ===
Certifications for The Ultimate Collection video
| Region | Certification | Certified units/sales |
|---|---|---|
| Australia (ARIA) | 5× Platinum | 75,000^{^} |
| New Zealand (RMNZ) | Platinum | 5,000^{^} |
| United Kingdom (BPI) | Gold | 25,000^{*} |
^{*} Sales figures based on certification alone.^{^} Shipments figures based on certification alone.
