= The Essential Billy Joel =

Greatest hits album by Billy Joel
- Released: October 2, 2001
- Recorded: 1973–2001
- Genre: Rock
- Length: 154:58; 188:53 (reissue)
- Label: Sony; Legacy
- Producer: Billy Joel, Michael Stewart, Phil Ramone, Mick Jones

Billy Joel chronology
Fantasies & Delusions (2001)	The Essential Billy Joel (2001)	Piano Man: The Very Best of Billy Joel (2004)

International Edition
- International/European cover

Professional ratings
Review scores
Source	Rating
Allmusic	4.5/5 stars

The Essential Billy Joel is a Sony music compilation of songs by American singer/songwriter Billy Joel. It was released on October 2, 2001, and has been certified 4× Platinum by the RIAA. In conjunction with the release of the album, The Essential Video Collection was released, comprising Joel's most popular music videos.

On August 26, 2008, The Essential 3.0 was released containing a third disc with seven additional tracks.

== Track listing ==
All songs written by Billy Joel.

=== Disc one ===
No.	Title	Original album	Length
1.	"Piano Man"	Piano Man, 1973	5:38
2.	"You're My Home"	Piano Man	3:14
3.	"Captain Jack"	Piano Man	7:18
4.	"The Entertainer"	Streetlife Serenade, 1974	3:41
5.	"Say Goodbye to Hollywood"	Turnstiles, 1976	4:39
6.	"Miami 2017 (Seen the Lights Go Out on Broadway)"	Turnstiles	5:14
7.	"New York State of Mind"	Turnstiles	6:05
8.	"She's Always a Woman"	The Stranger, 1977	3:22
9.	"Movin' Out (Anthony's Song)"	The Stranger	3:30
10.	"Only the Good Die Young"	The Stranger	3:56
11.	"Just the Way You Are"	The Stranger	4:50
12.	"Honesty"	52nd Street, 1978	3:54
13.	"My Life"	52nd Street	4:44
14.	"It's Still Rock and Roll to Me"	Glass Houses, 1980	2:57
15.	"You May Be Right"	Glass Houses	4:16
16.	"Don't Ask Me Why"	Glass Houses	2:59
17.	"She's Got a Way (Live)"	Songs in the Attic, 1981; originally from Cold Spring Harbor, 1971	3:02
18.	"Allentown"	The Nylon Curtain, 1982	3:49

=== Disc two ===
No.	Title	Original album	Length
1.	"Goodnight Saigon"	The Nylon Curtain	7:04
2.	"An Innocent Man"	An Innocent Man, 1983	5:21
3.	"Uptown Girl"	An Innocent Man	3:18
4.	"The Longest Time"	An Innocent Man	3:42
5.	"Tell Her About It"	An Innocent Man	3:53
6.	"Leave a Tender Moment Alone"	An Innocent Man	3:57
7.	"A Matter of Trust"	The Bridge, 1986	4:11
8.	"Baby Grand" (Duet with Ray Charles)	The Bridge	4:06
9.	"I Go to Extremes"	Storm Front, 1989	4:23
10.	"We Didn't Start the Fire"	Storm Front	4:50
11.	"Leningrad"	Storm Front	4:07
12.	"The Downeaster "Alexa""	Storm Front	3:44
13.	"And So It Goes"	Storm Front	3:38
14.	"The River of Dreams"	River of Dreams, 1993	4:07
15.	"All About Soul (Remix)"	Exclusive to the "All About Soul" single, 1993; originally from River of Dreams	6:00
16.	"Lullabye (Goodnight, My Angel)"	River of Dreams	3:33
17.	"Waltz no. 1 (Nunley's Carousel)"	Fantasies & Delusions, 2001	6:56
18.	"Invention in C minor"	Fantasies & Delusions	1:00

=== Disc three ===
No.	Title	Original album	Length
1.	"Worse Comes to Worst"	Piano Man	3:13
2.	"Prelude/Angry Young Man"	Turnstiles	5:16
3.	"Scenes from an Italian Restaurant"	The Stranger (the album's inner sleeve mistakenly credits this song to be from the album Turnstiles)	7:34
4.	"Big Shot"	52nd Street	4:02
5.	"All for Leyna"	Glass Houses	4:12
6.	"Pressure"	The Nylon Curtain	4:39
7.	"This Is the Time"	The Bridge	4:59

== Chart performance ==
=== Weekly charts ===
Chart (2001)	Peak position
US Billboard 200	29
Chart (2008)	Peak position
Australian Albums (ARIA); The Essential 3.0	50
New Zealand Albums (RMNZ)	14
Chart (2013)	Peak position
Irish Albums (IRMA)	66
US Billboard 200	15
Chart (2019)	Peak position
US Top Rock Albums (Billboard)	7
Chart (2025)	Peak position
Canadian Albums (Billboard)	61
Greek Albums (IFPI)	72

=== Year-end charts ===
Chart (2017)	Position
US Top Rock Albums (Billboard)	47
Chart (2018)	Position
US Top Rock Albums (Billboard)	44
Chart (2019)	Position
US Billboard 200	92
US Top Rock Albums (Billboard)	12
Chart (2020)	Position
US Billboard 200	117
US Top Rock Albums (Billboard)	11
Chart (2021)	Position
US Billboard 200	127
US Top Rock Albums (Billboard)	21
Chart (2024)	Position
US Billboard 200	189

== Certifications ==
Region	Certification	Certified units/sales
Australia (ARIA)	3× Platinum	210,000^{^}
New Zealand (RMNZ)	Platinum	15,000^{^}
United Kingdom (BPI)	Gold	100,000^{‡}
United States (RIAA)	4× Platinum	2,000,000^{‡}
^{^} Shipments figures based on certification alone.^{‡} Sales+streaming figures based on certification alone.
