= Captain Jack (Billy Joel song) =

Song by Billy Joel

Song by Billy Joel

from the album Piano Man
- Released: November 1973
- Recorded: 1973 in North Hollywood, California, U.S.
- Genre: Rock
- Length: 7:15
- Label: Columbia
- Songwriter: Billy Joel
- Producer: Michael Stewart

"Captain Jack" is a song by Billy Joel featured on his 1973 album Piano Man as its closing track with a live version on his 1981 album Songs in the Attic.

His performance of the song on April 15, 1972 during a live radio concert at Sigma Studios on WMMR in Philadelphia—and the subsequent airplay this live version received—brought him to the attention of major record labels, including Columbia. He signed a recording contract with Columbia in 1973.

== Composition ==
Joel wrote "Captain Jack" in late 1971, while sitting in his apartment in Oyster Bay, Long Island, looking out the window, trying to find inspiration for a song. Across the street was a housing project, and he observed suburban teenagers going into the project and obtaining heroin from a dealer known as "Captain Jack". "It's about coming out of the New York suburbs," Joel told John Kalodner in 1974. "But in my travels I have seen a lot of the same suburb all over the country. The song is sort of brutal, but sometimes it is good to be brutal and offend people—it keeps them on their toes."

The song, according to Joel, is an anti-drug song. He says, "What's so horrible about an affluent young teenager's life that he's got to shoot heroin? It's really a song about what I consider to be a pathetic loser kind of lifestyle. I've been accused of, 'Oh, this song promotes drug use and masturbation.' No, no, no. Listen to the song. This guy is a loser." In writing about the song in the liner notes of his Songs in the Attic album, Joel once again emphasized the point: "...so many friends shoveled under the Long Island dirt. The miracle of modern chemistry killed them if Vietnam didn't."

== Pre-release ==
To promote his debut album, Cold Spring Harbor, Joel undertook a tour that lasted through the spring and early summer of 1972. One of the people who noticed and liked the LP was the music director of Philadelphia radio station WMMR-FM, Dennis Wilen. He arranged to have Joel perform a concert for radio-station listeners who won tickets. On Saturday night, April 15, 1972, Joel performed an hour-long concert in front of these contest winners at Sigma Sound Studios in Philadelphia. Joel and his touring band from 1971 to 1972 (Larry Russell on bass guitar, Al Hertzberg on lead guitar, Rhys Clark on drums) performed 12 songs, seven from Cold Spring Harbor and five songs he had not yet recorded. Some of the songs were later recorded for the Piano Man LP, including "The Ballad of Billy the Kid", "Travelin' Prayer", and "Captain Jack".

"Captain Jack" was immediately embraced by WMMR's audience. For the next year and a half, the station kept its live version of the song in regular rotation. Listeners called in, wanting to know where they could find the song and on what album it appeared. The song was such a big hit in Philadelphia that several New York radio stations got their own tape copies and began to play it as well. Though Columbia Records' then-president, Clive Davis, first noticed Joel at the Mar y Sol festival in Puerto Rico on Easter Sunday, April 2, 1972, the constant airplay of Joel's unreleased song kept the label's attention. Columbia Records did its best to track Joel down. After turning down a record deal from Atlantic Records, Joel signed with Columbia in the spring of 1973.

== Release and reaction ==
"Captain Jack" was one of the 10 songs recorded in Los Angeles for Joel's Columbia debut, Piano Man. It quickly became a staple of FM rock stations after the album's release in November 1973. This, along with "Piano Man", "The Entertainer", and "New York State of Mind", were the songs which Joel was best known for before the release of The Stranger in 1977.

Reception for the song was mostly positive. Jack Breschard of Rolling Stone called it one of Joel's "best efforts". Ira Mayer called it Joel's "signature piece", and Stephen Holden said the song, a "centerpiece" of the album, "compelled attention for [its] despairing portraits of urban fringe life, despite [the] underlying shallowness." Holden also believed that the song had a Bob Dylan feel to it. "As with so many rock stars, one of his most important early influences was Bob Dylan–in fact, 'Piano Man' and 'Captain Jack,' two of his more ambitious early tunes, as well as the more recent and better 'She's Always a Woman,' are practically keyboard parodies of Dylan critiques," Holden says. Author Hank Bordowitz called "Captain Jack" "as bleak a portrait of growing up in the affluent suburbs as anything before L.A. punk hit nearly a decade later". Stuart Levine of Variety called the song "lyrically expansive" and "dark". Ron Rosenbaum of Slate, in a very negative review of Joel's work, criticized "Captain Jack", summarizing the song as, "Loser dresses up in poseur clothes and masturbates and shoots up heroin and is an all-around phony in the eyes of the songwriter who is so, so superior to him."

Joel made his first television appearance in the wake of the release of Piano Man on the syndicated Don Kirshner's Rock Concert program, in a performance recorded live in Chicago in March 1974. "Captain Jack" was one of the three songs that were broadcast. In keeping with U.S. broadcast television standards of the time, Joel was forced to alter the lyrics slightly. Instead of singing the line "You just sit at home and masturbate", he sang, "You just sit at home and la la la". Kirshner recalled, "I knew he was going to be a big star, and so did he."

By 1980, "Captain Jack" had mostly disappeared from Joel's concert setlists. Nevertheless, he played it in Philadelphia because of the role the song and the city played in his early career. A version recorded at The Spectrum in July 1980 was used on his live album, Songs in the Attic. Joel wrote, "'Captain Jack' plays with much more power and conviction when a roaring Philadelphia audience sets off a kind of internal explosion and the adrenaline screams through our veins ... When we play 'Captain Jack', we are actually committing an act of pure brutality." Timothy White of Rolling Stone did not like this version, calling it "grating".

The song entered the news again in 2000 when it was mistakenly used during Hillary Clinton's announcement that she would be campaigning for U.S. Senate. According to an NPR report on worst campaign songs, a staffer notes that the playing of "Captain Jack" was a mistake. It was played from the Billy Joel compilation CD Greatest Hits Volume 1, and the song intended to be played was "New York State of Mind", which was track five on the CD. The Clinton staffer inadvertently played track two, which was "Captain Jack". Her presumed opponent, Rudolph Giuliani, who ended up not running for the Senate, criticized the song's use because of its alleged glorification of drugs. Giuliani even read the lyrics to the song in a live press conference. Joel replied in a statement, "There are a lot of important issues facing the voters in this Senate race. Is a politician's interpretation of a song I wrote nearly 30 years ago an issue to the voters of New York state? I do not think so."

The song was also featured in the 2018 movie Game Night.

In a 2019 interview marking his 70th birthday, Joel commented on why he rarely plays the song anymore: "He didn’t age well. Captain Jack’s been demoted to Private Jack. In the verses, there’s only two chords, and it goes on and on, and it’s kind of a dreary song if you think of the lyrics. The kid is sitting home jerkin’ off. His father's dead in the swimming pool. He lives this dull suburban existence until he gets high. One of the last times I was singing the song, I said, 'This is really depressing.' The only relief you get is when the chorus kicks in. When I'm doing the song, I feel kinda dreary and I don't like doing the song anymore, although we'll probably do it again."

Live versions are included on the album Live at Shea Stadium: The Concert, the box set My Lives, and the soundtrack to the documentary Billy Joel: And So It Goes.

== Certifications and sales ==
| Region | Certification | Certified units/sales |
|---|---|---|
| United States (RIAA) | Gold | 500,000^{‡} |
^{‡} Sales+streaming figures based on certification alone.
