= Piano Man: The Very Best of Billy Joel =

Greatest hits album by Billy Joel
- Released: November 15, 2004
- Recorded: 1971–1993
- Genres: Pop, rock
- Length: 79:43 (2004); 78:21 (2006)
- Label: Columbia

Billy Joel chronology
The Essential Billy Joel (2001)	Piano Man: The Very Best of Billy Joel (2004)	My Lives (2005)

Professional ratings
Review scores
Source	Rating
AllMusic	4/5 stars
Classic Rock	4/5 stars

Piano Man: The Very Best of Billy Joel is a greatest hits album by Billy Joel, originally released on 15 November 2004. It was released in most regions with the exception of the United States. The album was re-released on 10 July 2006 with a DVD included. The CD contains 18 of his biggest hits, and the DVD contains 10 videos (some of which are live). The digital reissue of the compilation contains Joel's popular album track "Vienna" as the last track.

== Track listing ==
No.	Title	Original album	Length
1.	"Tell Her About It"	An Innocent Man, 1983	3:50
2.	"Uptown Girl"	An Innocent Man	3:15
3.	"Piano Man" (Single version)	Piano Man, 1973	4:34
4.	"New York State of Mind"	Turnstiles, 1976	6:02
5.	"The River of Dreams"	River of Dreams, 1993	4:05
6.	"It's Still Rock and Roll to Me"	Glass Houses, 1980	2:55
7.	"We Didn't Start the Fire"	Storm Front, 1989	4:50
8.	"Goodnight Saigon"	The Nylon Curtain, 1982	7:01
9.	"My Life"	52nd Street, 1978	4:43
10.	"She's Always a Woman"	The Stranger, 1977	3:20
11.	"She's Got a Way" (Live)	Songs in the Attic, 1981; originally from Cold Spring Harbor, 1971	2:59
12.	"Scenes from an Italian Restaurant"	The Stranger	7:33
13.	"An Innocent Man"	An Innocent Man	5:18
14.	"Movin' Out (Anthony's Song)"	The Stranger	3:29
15.	"Only the Good Die Young"	The Stranger	3:53
16.	"All About Soul" (Single Version)	River of Dreams	4:17
17.	"Honesty"	52nd Street	3:49
18.	"Just the Way You Are" (Single Version)	The Stranger	3:20

=== Australian version ===
No.	Title	Original album	Length
1.	"Tell Her About It"	An Innocent Man	3:50
2.	"Uptown Girl"	An Innocent Man	3:15
3.	"Don't Ask Me Why"	Glass Houses	2:56
4.	"Piano Man"	Piano Man	4:34
5.	"New York State of Mind"	Turnstiles	6:02
6.	"The River of Dreams"	River of Dreams	4:05
7.	"It's Still Rock and Roll to Me"	Glass Houses	2:55
8.	"We Didn't Start the Fire" (Single Version)	Storm Front	4:29
9.	"Goodnight Saigon"	The Nylon Curtain	7:01
10.	"My Life" (Single Version)	52nd Street	3:51
11.	"She's Always a Woman"	The Stranger	3:20
12.	"She's Got a Way" (Live)	Songs in the Attic; originally from Cold Spring Harbor	2:59
13.	"Scandinavian Skies"	The Nylon Curtain	5:57
14.	"An Innocent Man"	An Innocent Man	5:18
15.	"Movin' Out (Anthony's Song)"	The Stranger	3:29
16.	"Only the Good Die Young"	The Stranger	3:53
17.	"All About Soul" (Single Version)	River of Dreams	4:17
18.	"Honesty"	52nd Street	3:49
19.	"Just the Way You Are" (Single Version)	The Stranger	3:20

== DVD ==
No.	Title	Length
1.	"Tell Her About It"
2.	"Uptown Girl"
3.	"Piano Man" (Live)
4.	"New York State of Mind" (Live)
5.	"The River of Dreams"
6.	"It's Still Rock and Roll to Me"
7.	"We Didn't Start the Fire"
8.	"Goodnight Saigon" (Live)
9.	"My Life"
10.	"All About Soul" (Live)

== Charts ==
=== Weekly charts ===
Chart (2004–2020)	Peak position
Australian Albums (ARIA)	14
Austrian Albums (Ö3 Austria)	15
Belgian Albums (Ultratop Flanders)	134
Canadian Albums (Billboard)	67
German Albums (Offizielle Top 100)	93
Irish Albums (IRMA)	1
Japanese Albums (Oricon)	17
Japanese International Albums (Oricon)	5
New Zealand Albums (RMNZ)	13
Scottish Albums (Official Charts)	3
UK Albums (Official Charts)	7
UK Album Downloads (Official Charts)	51
UK Physical Albums (OCC)	5

=== Year-end charts ===
Chart (2004)	Position
UK Albums (OCC)	161
Chart (2008)	Position
UK Albums (OCC)	139
Chart (2010)	Position
UK Albums (OCC)	112
Chart (2021)	Position
UK Albums (OCC)	100
Chart (2022)	Position
UK Albums (OCC)	63
Chart (2023)	Position
UK Albums (OCC)	59
Chart (2024)	Position
UK Albums (OCC)	51
Chart (2025)	Position
UK Albums (OCC)	38

== Certifications ==
Certifications for Piano Man: The Very Best of Billy Joel
Region	Certification	Certified units/sales
Australia (ARIA)	2× Platinum	140,000^{^}
Ireland (IRMA)	3× Platinum	45,000^{^}
Japan (RIAJ)	Gold	100,000^{^}
Mexico (AMPROFON)	Gold	50,000^{^}
New Zealand (RMNZ)	Platinum	15,000^{‡}
South Africa (RISA)	Platinum	50,000^{*}
United Kingdom (BPI)	6× Platinum	1,800,000^{‡}
^{*} Sales figures based on certification alone.^{^} Shipments figures based on certification alone.^{‡} Sales+streaming figures based on certification alone.
