= Billy Joel: Opus Collection =

Compilation album by Billy Joel
- Released: March 20, 2012
- Genre: Rock
- Length: 69:53
- Label: Hear Music

Billy Joel chronology
Live at Shea Stadium: The Concert (2011)	Billy Joel: Opus Collection (2012)

Billy Joel: Opus Collection is a compilation album by the American rock musician Billy Joel that was a Starbucks exclusive.

== Reception ==
Professional ratings
Review scores
Source	Rating
AllMusic	3.5/5 stars

In an AllMusic review by Stephen Thomas Erlewine, he stated that it was a "16-track snapshot of Billy Joel in his prime." and called it a "good, entertaining sampler of some of Billy's best songs." The Second Disc critic Joe Marchese states that it "draws on eight of the artist’s Columbia Records releases, from 1973’s breakthrough Piano Man to 1993’s River of Dreams."

== Track listing ==
All tracks are written by Billy Joel.

No.	Title	Length
1.	"My Life"	4:44
2.	"Travelin' Prayer"	4:16
3.	"Piano Man"	4:30
4.	"She's Always a Woman"	3:21
5.	"Vienna"	3:34
6.	"Summer, Highland Falls"	3:15
7.	"An Innocent Man"	5:17
8.	"And So It Goes"	3:38
9.	"Just the Way You Are"	4:47
10.	"Movin' Out (Anthony's Song)"	3:28
11.	"You May Be Right"	4:15
12.	"The Downeaster "Alexa""	3:44
13.	"New York State of Mind"	6:00
14.	"Honesty"	3:53
15.	"Scenes from an Italian Restaurant"	7:37
16.	"Lullabye (Goodnight, My Angel)"	3:34

== Charts ==
Weekly chart performance for Opus Collection
Chart (2012)	Peak position
US Billboard 200	80
US Top Rock Albums (Billboard)	19
