= Larry Russell (bassist) =

Musical artist (b. 1950)

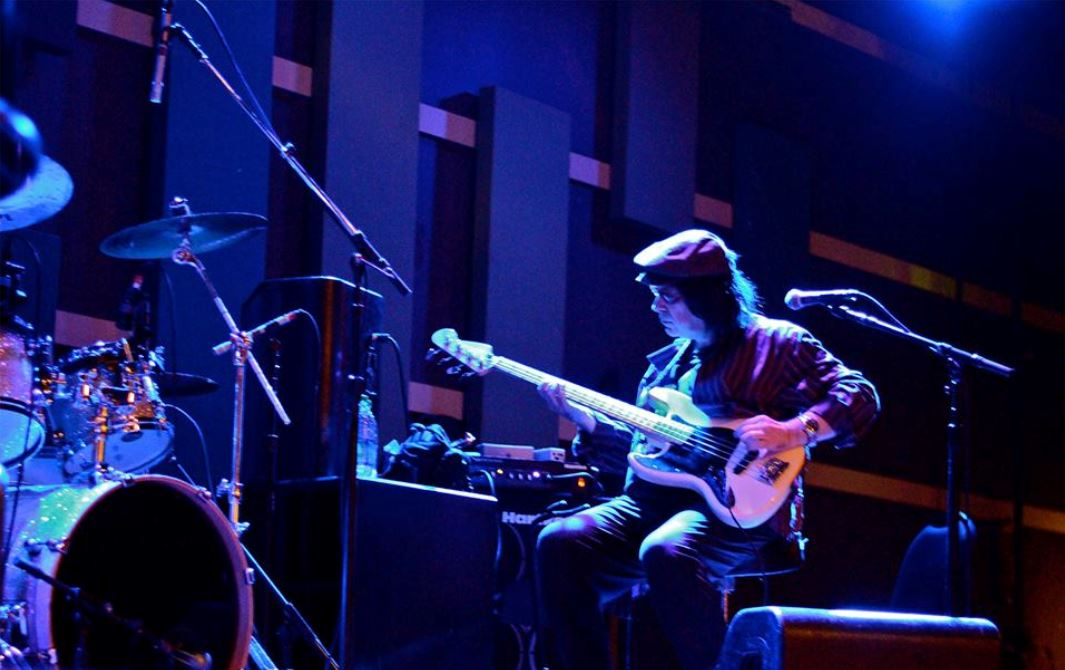
- Russell performing in Philadelphia, Pennsylvania in 2013.

Background information
- Born: June 10, 1950 (age 76)
- Occupations: Performing musician, composer, recording producer, audio engineer
- Instruments: Bass guitar, drums, percussion, keyboards
- Years active: 1964–present
- Website: Facebook.com/Muzikjakit

Larry Russell (born 1950 in Manhattan) is a New York City-based performing musician, recording producer, audio engineer, and composer. He achieved national recognition for his collaborations with Billy Joel.

== Career ==
=== Early career ===
In the mid-1960s, Russell played drums with The Age of Reason, a 5-piece musical group from the North Bronx area of New York City. The group was initially known as The Loose Ends. Other band members were Alan Turner (lead vocals), Sid Sheres (lead guitar), Kenny Dale (guitar), and Andy Adams (bass guitar). Later bass players were Phil Marden and Ronnie Tagliagambi. Hammond B-3 organ players Billy Killoran joined in mid-1967 and Mike Chait joined in 1968. The group was co-managed and produced by Neil Levenson (writer of the 1963 hit song Denise which was later covered by Blondie) and signed by United Artists Records. The group played throughout the New York City metropolitan area and opened for Billy Joel's early band The Hassles.

The group's first single, "(Your Love is Like a) Magnet", written by Turner, was released on Ascot (a United Artists subsidiary label) in March 1967. The B-side was Turner's "I'm a Free Man". When the single reached national charts, its success gave the band the opportunity to appear on television shows such as Clay Cole's Diskotek (on April 22, 1967) and John Zacherle's Disc-o-Teen (in April 1967). "Magnet" was featured in American Bandstand's "Rate-a-Record" segment on May 13, 1967. Additionally, the group opened for established acts such as the Four Tops, The Drifters, The Box Tops, and The Young Rascals. The group dissolved in 1968.

=== With Billy Joel ===
Having been influenced by Paul McCartney and James Jamerson, Russell switched to bass guitar. As a bassist, Russell was the first member of the first touring band that backed Billy Joel in his solo career and was joined by guitarist Al Hertzberg and drummer Rhys Clark in touring with Joel from 1971 to 1972 to support Joel's Cold Spring Harbor album. The band gelled as it toured throughout the U.S., opening for nationally known acts. The group performed at the Mar y Sol pop festival in Puerto Rico on April 2, 1972, rousing and commanding a crowd of 10,000. Reviewer Don Heckman of The New York Times wrote, "...the first real excitement [of the festival] was generated by Billy Joel's Gospel-tinged rock band...the Billy Joel group brought some life to what had been a generally dispirited environment."

Russell was the bass guitarist on Joel's breakthrough Sigma Sound Studios radio concert broadcast on Philadelphia's WMMR-FM on April 5, 1972 (in which Joel introduced him as "Larry Larue"). Music writer Jonathan Takiff described the ensemble as being a "take-no prisoners touring band". The Sigma performance included the Joel songs "Travelin' Prayer", "The Ballad of Billy the Kid", and "Captain Jack". The recording of the latter became the most requested song in the radio station's history and its popularity is credited with bringing Joel to the attention of personnel at Columbia Records, the record company that ultimately signed him.

Studio recordings of "Travelin' Prayer", "The Ballad of Billy the Kid", and "Captain Jack" were included on Joel's 1973 release Piano Man. Audio of the Sigma show itself was included with Joel's Piano Man - Legacy Edition album, released on November 8, 2011. In 2013 and 2014, Russell reunited with Clark and was joined by Cold Spring Harbor guitarist Don Evans and pianists / vocalists Elio Pace and David Clark (a veteran Billy Joel tribute artist) in a "Long Long Time" production, which re-created the Sigma show at performances in New York City, Philadelphia, and Wilmington, Delaware.

On December 23, 2014, Russell received a Recording Industry Association of America (RIAA) Multi-Platinum Album Award for his contribution to Joel's Piano Man album.

=== Performing musician ===
As a bass guitarist, Russell has also toured or performed with such artists as The Mamas & the Papas, Elliott Murphy, Mary Travers, Robert Gordon, Gary US Bonds, and Camille O'Sullivan, as well with such productions as the off-Broadway and touring companies of Godspell (from 1973 to 1976).

Russell performed as a percussionist with Bryan Adams on NBC's Late Night With Conan O'Brien television show in 1996, the VH1 Fashion Awards show in 1996, and NBC's The Rosie O'Donnell Show in 1996 and 1997. Russell can be seen playing bass guitar in a December 2013 episode of Steven Van Zandt's Netflix television webseries Lilyhammer.

In 2005, Russell founded Larry Russell's Beatlestock, a Beatles sing-along tribute band. The group was officially endorsed by the late Beatles promoter Sid Bernstein. Russell plays bass in the band. Larry Russell's Beatlestock performs at various venues in the tri-state New York, New Jersey, and Connecticut area.

=== Composer, recording producer, audio engineer, promoter ===
Russell's original music was chosen as the soundtrack to a 2005 documentary about The Superfight: Marciano vs. Ali, a 1970 movie that depicted a fictional boxing match between Rocky Marciano and Muhammad Ali whose outcome was determined by probability formulas that considered the boxers' characteristics. The documentary was produced and directed by boxing analyst Mike DeLisa and was included with the original film and other materials in a 2005 DVD release. Also, Russell's Beatlesque song "Don't Turn Me Down", written with former Beatlemania star Joe Pecorino and conceived for Ringo Starr's consideration, was included on the soundtrack for the 2016 short film "Pepperland II." (Developed by Pete Clements, Pepperland II is the continuation of his homage to the Beatles' 1968 film Yellow Submarine.) Lead singer is comedian and celebrity impersonator Stevie Riks, with Russell and Pecorino providing background vocals.

In 2011, Russell produced the pre-released single "Tempted" (a cover of the 1981 hit by Squeeze) performed by season six American Idol finalist Sanjaya Malakar. The single was included on Malakar's 2011 album Life ~ Love ~ Music. Russell holds the photo credit for the single's cover art.

Russell was one of two people (the other being recording producer and engineer Eddie Kramer) who suggested drummer Anton Fig to ex-Kiss lead guitarist Ace Frehley, whom Russell has known since the 1960s. The connection led to an ongoing collaboration. Since 1978, Fig has worked on various projects with Kiss and with Frehley as a solo artist.

Russell was an engineer and provided overdubs on Frehley's "The Joker", a cover of the Steve Miller Band's hit and the second single released from Frehley's 2014 hit album Space Invader. The Space Invader compact disc debuted at number 9 on the Billboard 200 chart.

In November 2018, Russell began publishing a periodic modcast titled "All About You" in which he interviews well-regarded people in entertainment. His first interview was with Dylan Bernstein, son of Sid Bernstein, the American music producer and promoter who first brought The Beatles to the United States. His modcasts include a Godspell series in which he interviews personalities who played a role in that work's success, including composer Stephen Schwartz; Paul Shaffer (music director of the Toronto cast); original drummer and percussionist Rick Shutter; actress Melanie Mayron; and director, producer, and actor Don Scardino, who played Jesus in the original off-Broadway show and directed A Few Good Men on Broadway and The Days and Nights of Molly Dodd on television.

In 2019, Russell paved the way for British musician Poppy Waterman-Smith, professionally known as Poppy WS, to perform at New York City's oldest rock club, The Bitter End in Greenwich Village. Russell arranged the gig after having noticed her talent in her YouTube videos. Waterman-Smith first hit headlines in July 2016 when she opened for Seal in Manchester, England, having been invited to perform after Seal noticed her talent as she was busking.

== Selected discography ==
- 1979 - compilation album - "(Love is Like a) Magnet" appears on Ear-Piercing Punk
- 1980 - Elliott Murphy - Affairs
- 1981 - Tommy Mandel - Tommy Mandel
- 1981 - Hilly Michaels - Lumia
- 1984 - Gary U.S. Bonds and The American Men - Standing in the Line of Fire
- 1989 - Don Johnson - Let It Roll
- 1996 - compilation compact disc - "(Love is Like a) Magnet" appears on Ear-Piercing Punk
- 1997 - Elliott Murphy - Going through Something: The Best Of Elliott Murphy
- 2003 - compilation compact disc - Age of Reason's "(It's a) Dirty Shame" appears on Psychedelic States: New York in the 60s (Vol. 1)
- 2011 - Billy Joel - Piano Man - Legacy Edition
