= Piano Man (disambiguation) =

"Piano Man" is a 1973 song by Billy Joel.

Piano Man may also refer to:

== Music ==
- Piano Man (Billy Joel album), 1973
- Piano Man (Hilton Ruiz album), 1975
- Piano Man: The Very Best of Billy Joel, a 2004 compilation album
- Piano Man (EP) a 2014 EP by Mamamoo, or the title song
- "Piano Man", a song from the 2008 album Human by Brandy Norwood
- "Piano Man", a song by Billy Eckstine on the 1959 album Basie and Eckstine, Inc.
- "Piano Man", a song by Irving Berlin
- "Piano Man", a 1972 single by Thelma Houston written by Michael Masser and Kaye Lawrence Dunham

== People ==
- Pianoman, an alias of dance music producer James Sammon
- Andreas Grassl, a man found in England in April 2005, nicknamed "Piano Man" by the media
- Billy Joel (born 1949), American musician and singer-songwriter; nicknamed "Piano Man" after his first major hit
- Shock G, lead vocalist of Digital Underground, who uses the alias "The Piano Man"
- Vann "Piano Man" Walls (1918–1999), American rhythm and blues pianist

== Other uses ==
- "Piano Man" (Quantum Leap), a 1991 television episode

== See also ==
- Pianist
