= Everybody Loves You Now =

- Side B of the US single

Single by Billy Joel

from the album Cold Spring Harbor
- A-side: "She's Got a Way" (Netherlands); "Tomorrow Is Today" (US)
- Released: 1972
- Recorded: July 1971
- Studio: Record Plant Studios, Los Angeles, CA
- Genre: Rock
- Length: 2:47
- Label: Family Productions (U.S.); Philips (U.K.)
- Songwriter: Billy Joel
- Producer: Artie Ripp

Billy Joel singles chronology
"Everybody Loves You Now" (1972)	"Piano Man/You're My Home" (1973)

"Everybody Loves You Now" is a song written by Billy Joel. It was first released on his 1971 debut album Cold Spring Harbor and was also released as a B-side to his singles "She's Got a Way" and "Tomorrow Is Today". Live versions were included on the albums Songs in the Attic, 12 Gardens Live and Live at Shea Stadium: The Concert.

== Lyrics and music ==
The lyrics to "Everybody Loves You Now" describe a spoiled woman who thinks she is better than everyone now that she has become famous. She now considers herself too good to return to her hometown of Cold Spring Harbor, Long Island. Joel took the title for his debut album from this line of the song. Despite her haughtiness, the singer desires her as does everyone else. The singer warns her that even though now she can take her attention for granted, since everyone wants her, eventually they will stop caring about her and she will be lonely. Joel biographer Fred Schruers describes the song as "both a rebuke and confession of tangled desire."

Ken Bielen describes "Everybody Loves You Now" as "an acoustic guitar-based shuffle." Joel plays piano on the song. Bielen describes Joel's piano playing as "upbeat" and Schruers describes him as playing "hammering, almost barrelhouse chords. Cash Box described it as a "flashy and splashy rave-up."

Joel has described "Everybody Loves You Now" as a "zinger" that "balanced out" the corniness of "She's Got a Way", saying that "I can be venomous but I could also be a mush."

Joel originally included "Everybody Loves You Now" on a five-song demo tape that also included other songs that would appear on Cold Spring Harbor such as "She's Got a Way" and "Tomorrow Is Today" which Joel made in an unsuccessful attempt to secure his first solo recording contract with Paramount Records.

There are a few differences between the initial release of the song in 1971 and the re-release of the song in 1983. The original version contains a guitar mimicking the piano throughout the track, a reversed piano chord, and a lighter drum track, played by Rhys Clark. The 1983 version removes the guitar, plays the piano chord forwards, and features a faster and more upbeat drum track, played by Mike McGee.

== Live versions ==
Allmusic critic Stephen Thomas Erlewine described the live version included on Songs in the Attic as hitting harder than the studio version. Joel has said that at the time he had reinterpreted the song as "a macho rationale for being rejected. Her? Leave me? She must be a self-possessed bitch! Anyway, everybody didn't really love her. I just thought that they did." A 16 mm black and white promotional video was made of "Everybody Loves You Now" being performed live at a small club in support of Songs in the Attic.

Joel has often played the song live before and since. For example, he played it at the Gaslight au Go Go in 1971 and at Carnegie Hall in 1973. He played it as the 2006 shows at Madison Square Garden and the song was included on the resulting album 12 Gardens Live. This version incorporates a Hammond B-3 organ, which according to Bielen adds "soulful fullness." Joel also included it in his set for the final concert at Shea Stadium in July 2008, and it was included on the resulting album Live at Shea Stadium: The Concert.

== Critical reception ==
As early as 1974, Billboard critic Jim Melanson described "Everybody Loves You Now" as one of the songs that had brought Joel to national attention. Allmusic critic Stephen Thomas Erlewine described the studio version as being "bitterly cynical" and rated it as one of Joel's "finest songs." Joel biographer Hank Bordowitz called it a "remarkable composition that, while not great, at least indicate[d] a rising talent." Billboard's Roy Waddell similarly described it as a "chestnut" that did not get its "proper due" until the live version was released on Songs in the Attic. Music critic Mark Bego praises Joel's "keyboard dexterity" and the drumming on the song, saying that it "perfectly confronts the ironic duality of a life in show business." According to Rolling Stone Album Guide critic Paul Evans, "Everybody Loves You Now" was a precursor for the sarcasm Joel would incorporate in his songs throughout his career.
