= You're My Home (song) =

Single by Billy Joel

from the album Piano Man
- A-side: "Piano Man"
- Released: November 2, 1973
- Recorded: September 1973, Los Angeles
- Genre: Folk rock, country pop
- Length: 3:14
- Label: Columbia
- Songwriter: Billy Joel
- Producer: Michael Stewart

Billy Joel singles chronology
"She's Got a Way" (1972)	"You're My Home" (1973)	"Worse Comes to Worst" (1974)

"You're My Home" is a single by Billy Joel. It was originally on Joel's 1973 album Piano Man, and also appears on Songs in the Attic (1981), The Ultimate Collection (2000), The Essential Billy Joel (2001) and 12 Gardens Live (2006). The song appears as a B-side on "Piano Man" and "All My Life" singles. The song was also covered by Helen Reddy on her album Love Song for Jeffrey, which was released as the flipside of her "Keep On Singing" single. It was also recorded by Sami Jo Cole on her album Sami Jo produced by Jimmy Bowen.

== Background ==
The song was written for Joel's first wife (and business manager) Elizabeth Weber because he could not afford to buy her anything while in California. As Joel says in the liner notes of Songs in the Attic, "Corny but true; I was broke at the time ('73) so I wrote this for my wife as a Valentine's Day gift".

The bridge makes references to Pennsylvania Turnpike, the early morning dew of Indiana and the hills of California.

The original version is accompanied by a finger-picked acoustic guitar as well as a pedal steel guitar. The latter introduces a country music element to the song. The live version on Songs in the Attic omits the pedal steel guitar, but it is included on the live version from the "All My Life" single.

The version from Songs in the Attic was released as a single in Australia and as a promotional-only release in UK.

== Critical reception ==
Author Ken Bielen describes "You're My Home" as being from the Jim Croce school of singer-songwriting. Allmusic critic Stephen Thomas Erlewine describes it as the one introspective song on the Piano Man album. Erlewine does state that the line "instant pleasure dome" indicates that Joel "doesn't have an ear for words".

== Helen Reddy's cover version ==
Australian singer Helen Reddy's cover version incorporates an orchestral arrangement, in addition to a finger-picked acoustic guitar. Joel was critical of Reddy's version; he commented of her cover: "Helen Reddy once cut something of mine, a song called 'You're My Home,' which wasn't great. I did it at a gig once and introduced it sayin,' 'This is a song of mine Helen Reddy cut... to pieces.' Turns out her husband or her manager was in the audience, and they were talkin' about suing me. Then Helen got in touch and said she was never recording one of my songs again, and I was like, 'D'you promise?' Kind of a smart-ass reply – maybe I shoulda just shut up. I gotta let these things go, it shouldn't bother me."

== In popular culture ==
The song was used to wake up astronauts aboard Space Shuttle mission STS-132 in May 2010. The song was selected for astronaut Kenneth Ham.
