= Tomorrow Is Today (song) =

- Side A of the US single

Single by Billy Joel

from the album Cold Spring Harbor
- B-side: "Everybody Loves You Now"
- Written: 1970
- Released: November 1, 1971
- Studio: Ultrasonic Recording (Hempstead, New York)
- Genre: Soft rock
- Label: Family Productions
- Songwriter: Billy Joel
- Producer: Artie Ripp

"Tomorrow Is Today" is a song written by Billy Joel, released on his first studio album, Cold Spring Harbor (1971). It was originally released as Joel's first single in the United States, backed by the track "Everybody Loves You Now" in 1972.

== Lyrics and context ==
In 1970 after the breakup of Joel's duo Attila and a failed relationship, Joel attempted suicide by drinking furniture polish alone in his bedroom. The song analyzes Joel's thoughts as he attempted suicide. The lyrics state that "Nothing comes to change my life, so tomorrow is today," meaning he does not believe his life could improve.

The overall theme is the feeling of being completely fed up with the circumstances his life has come to. The narrator feels that life is monotonous and he feels that every day is the same as the previous one. This is best represented by the line, "What's the use of always dreaming if tomorrow is today?" He has no intention of dreaming of something better. Joel has often referred to this song as a "suicide note" rather than a true composition.

== Musical composition ==
The time signature of the song is 4/4 and is in C major. This is a similar structure to many of the songs on Billy Joel's first album Cold Spring Harbor. The song tracks at 85bpm and has a slow and methodical tempo. The songs also modulates to A minor during the bridge section of the chorus.

== Critical reception and charts ==
The single was released under Family Productions records in 1972. The single failed to chart in the United States, as Joel's first album suffered from poor mastering and failed advertising.

The critical reception of the song was generally favorable. The lyrical composition is often praised for its general relatability and sensitivity. The chordal composition of the song is noted as a generally intricate chordal progression with a strong melody. The song is noted as being "beautifully depressing" by One Final Serenade, a Billy Joel fan site.

== Live performances ==
One performance was in 1972 at Sigma Sound Studios during a live WMMR radio broadcast concert. This live performance would later be released on the legacy edition of Piano Man.
