= Streetlife Serenade =

Studio album by Billy Joel
- Released: October 11, 1974
- Recorded: 1974
- Studios: Devonshire, Los Angeles, California
- Genres: Pop rock; soft rock
- Length: 37:41
- Label: Family Productions/Columbia
- Producer: Michael Stewart

Billy Joel chronology
Piano Man (1973)	Streetlife Serenade (1974)	Turnstiles (1976)

Singles from Streetlife Serenade
- 1. "The Entertainer" Released: November 1974

Professional ratings
Review scores
Source	Rating
AllMusic	3/5 stars
Christgau's Record Guide	C
Rolling Stone	Unfavorable

Streetlife Serenade is the third studio album by American recording artist Billy Joel, released on October 11, 1974, by Columbia Records.

The album peaked at No. 35 on the US album charts, eventually selling more than one million copies. Joel's live shows in the 1970s frequently featured the instrumental "Root Beer Rag" and the short song "Souvenir", which was often used as the final encore. Live versions of "Streetlife Serenader" and "Los Angelenos" appeared on Joel's first live album, Songs in the Attic (1981). A live version of "The Entertainer" appeared on Joel's 2006 album 12 Gardens Live.

== Background ==
The album was recorded mostly with session musicians, the last such release until 1993's River of Dreams. Joel sang and played piano and other keyboards, including his first work with the Moog synthesizer.

Joel said that he had been touring in clubs and theatres and opening for big acts such as the Beach Boys, and was under pressure to put out a new album after Piano Man. With little time to write new songs, he included the instrumentals "Root Beer Rag" and "The Mexican Connection".

The back cover features a barefooted Joel sitting in a chair looking cross; Joel says that he had had his wisdom teeth extracted two days before the shoot. The front cover is a painting by Brian Hagiwara of a hotel and café at 1002 South Gaffy Street in San Pedro, California.

In a 1993 interview, Joel said of the album: "Interesting musical ideas, but nothing to say lyrically. I was trying to be Debussy in the title track — it didn’t work."

== Release history ==
In the UK, the album was released in July 1975 with no accompanying singles. In addition to the usual two-channel stereo version, the album was also released by Columbia in a four-channel quadraphonic mix on LP record and 8-track tape in 1974. The quad LP release was encoded in the SQ matrix system. In 2015, the album was re-issued by Audio Fidelity in the Super Audio CD format containing both the complete stereo and quadraphonic mixes.

== Track listing ==
All tracks are written by Billy Joel.

One Side
No.	Title	Length
1.	"Streetlife Serenader"	5:17
2.	"Los Angelenos"	3:41
3.	"The Great Suburban Showdown"	3:44
4.	"Root Beer Rag" (instrumental)"	2:59
5.	"Roberta"	4:32

Another Side
No.	Title	Length
1.	"The Entertainer"	3:48
2.	"Last of the Big Time Spenders"	4:34
3.	"Weekend Song"	3:29
4.	"Souvenir"	2:00
5.	"The Mexican Connection" (instrumental)"	3:37
Total length:		37:41

== Personnel ==
- Billy Joel – vocals, acoustic piano, keyboards, Moog synthesizer, arrangements
- William "Smitty" Smith – organ
- Richard Bennett – guitars
- Gary Dalton – guitars
- Mike Deasy – guitars
- Don Evans – guitars
- Al Hertzberg – guitars
- Art Munson – guitars
- Raj Rathor – guitars
- Michael Stewart – guitars, arrangements
- Tom Whitehorse – banjo, pedal steel guitar
- Wilton Felder – bass
- Emory Gordy Jr. – bass
- Larry Knechtel – bass
- Ron Tutt – drums
- Joe Clayton – congas, percussion

Production

- Michael Stewart – producer
- Ron Malo – engineer
- Joseph M. Palmaccio (erroneously credited to Ted Jensen) – 1998 CD digital remastering
- John Naatjes – tape research
- Ron Coro – art direction, design
- Brian Hagiwara – cover painting
- Peter Cunningham – photography
- Jim Marshall – photography

== Charts ==
=== Weekly charts ===
Chart (1974–75)	Peak position
Australia (Kent Music Report)	85
Canadian Albums (RPM)	16
US Billboard 200	35

=== Certifications ===
Region	Certification	Certified units/sales
United States (RIAA)	Platinum	1,000,000^{^}
^{^} Shipments figures based on certification alone.
