= Fantasies & Delusions =

Studio album by Billy Joel
- Released: September 27, 2001
- Recorded: June 2001
- Genre: Classical
- Length: 76:17
- Label: Sony Classical/Columbia
- Producer: Steve Epstein

Billy Joel chronology
The Ultimate Collection (2000)	Fantasies & Delusions (2001)	The Essential Billy Joel (2001)

Fantasies & Delusions is the thirteenth and final studio album composed by American singer-songwriter Billy Joel, released in 2001. His only studio album to contain classical compositions, it features his longtime friend, the British-Korean pianist Richard Hyung-ki Joo, performing compositions written by Joel; Joel himself does not perform on the album. It was Joel's 19th album to chart on the Billboard 200, reaching No. 83 in October 2001. The album debuted at No. 1 on Billboard′s Top Classical Albums chart.

Fantasies & Delusions was originally recorded at Cove City Sound Studios, Glen Cove, New York, with help from veteran production coordinator Bill Zampino and Richie Cannata; later, the album was re-recorded in Vienna, Austria, for final release. "Opus 1. Soliloquy (On a Separation)" and "Opus 3. Reverie (Villa d'Este)" had first been heard in public on October 4, 1997, when they were played by Yuliya Gorenman at the Seiji Ozawa Hall in Lenox, Massachusetts. A recording of her performance of the second piece was broadcast nine days later on WNYC-FM and WSHU-FM.

The cover design is based on the covers of the Schirmer's Library of Musical Classics sheet music books.

== Critical reception ==
Professional ratings
Review scores
Source	Rating
AllMusic	3/5 stars
Rolling Stone	2.5/5 stars

In January 2002, Gramophone UK called the album a "pleasing‚ undemanding sequence of ‘classical’ pieces from one of pop’s giants".

Stephen Thomas Erlewine of AllMusic said the album is a "nice collection of pleasingly modest, melodic solo piano pieces". He added that Joel succeeds on it because "he kept his ambitions reasonable and was smart about presentation" while retaining the "recognizable melodic flair" of his pop work. At the end of his review, Erlewine concluded that the tracks "are not pieces that you'll wind up humming" but among "the best in recent memory".

== Track listing ==
All opuses composed by Billy Joel.

1. Opus 3. Reverie (Villa d'Este) – 9:31
2. Opus 2. Waltz #1 (Nunley's Carousel) – 6:58
3. Opus 7. Aria (Grand Canal) – 11:08
4. Opus 6. Invention in C Minor – 1:04
5. Opus 1. Soliloquy (On a Separation) – 11:26
6. Opus 8. Suite for Piano (Star-Crossed): I. Innamorato – 7:46
7. Opus 8. Suite for Piano (Star-Crossed): II. Sorbetto – 1:30
8. Opus 8. Suite for Piano (Star-Crossed): III. Delusion – 3:37
9. Opus 5. Waltz #2 (Steinway Hall) – 7:00
10. Opus 9. Waltz #3 (For Lola) – 3:28
11. Opus 4. Fantasy (Film Noir) – 8:56
12. Opus 10. Air (Dublinesque) – 3:46

== Personnel ==
- Richard Hyung-ki Joo – piano

== "Symphonic Fantasies for Piano and Orchestra" ==
In 2003, pianist Jeffrey Biegel approached Joel about a commission for a piano concerto. As an alternative, Joel suggested that Biegel create a piano concerto using pieces from Fantasies and Delusions. Biegel did so, using four of the pieces: "Fantasy (Film Noir)", "Sorbetto", "Reverie (Villa d'Este)", and "Nunley's Carousel Waltz". After Biegel had written the piano part, Nashville composer Philip Keveren composed the orchestral parts. The work, titled "Symphonic Fantasies for Piano and Orchestra", premiered on June 24, 2006 in Greensboro, North Carolina. Biegel was the pianist, accompanied by the Eastern Philharmonic Orchestra led by Stuart Malina.

== Charts ==
Chart (2001-02)	Peak Position
US Billboard 200	83
US Billboard Classical Albums	1
