= Worse Comes to Worst =

Single by Billy Joel

from the album Piano Man
- B-side: "Somewhere Along the Line"
- Released: June 1974
- Studio: Devonshire Sound, Los Angeles
- Genre: Rock
- Length: 2:48 (single version); 3:28 (album version)
- Label: Columbia
- Songwriter: Billy Joel
- Producer: Michael Stewart

Billy Joel singles chronology
"Piano Man" (1973)	"Worse Comes to Worst" (1974)	"Travelin' Prayer" (1974)

"Worse Comes to Worst" is a song by singer Billy Joel released as the second single from his 1973 album Piano Man. It reached number 80 on the Billboard Hot 100.

== Reception ==
Cash Box said that "this rocking, funky tune that will open up an entirely new audience" for Joel, stating that it contains "some great guitar licks throughout backing Billy's vocals and some fine harmonies." Record World said that Joel "gets funkier with another personal tale of love, stardom and glory set in today's uncertain circumstances" and that "tinges of organ and steel drums blend into a trendsetting Latin-rock variant." Billboard recommended the song.

Music lecturer Ken Bielen describes "Worse Comes to Worst" as being "a little bit country, a little bit rock and a little bit gospel."

== Chart positions ==
Chart (1974)	Peak position
Canadian Singles Chart	62
U.S. Billboard Hot 100	80
