= Travelin' Prayer =

Single by Billy Joel

from the album Piano Man
- B-side: "Ain't No Crime"
- Released: August 1974
- Studio: Devonshire Sound, Los Angeles
- Genre: Country rock
- Length: 3:03 (single version); 4:16 (album version)
- Label: Family Productions/Columbia
- Songwriter: Billy Joel
- Producer: Michael Stewart

Billy Joel singles chronology
| "Worse Comes to Worst" (1974) | "Travelin' Prayer" (1974) | "The Ballad of Billy the Kid" (1974) |

"Travelin' Prayer" is a song written and performed by singer Billy Joel, and released as the third US single from his 1973 album Piano Man as its opening track. The song is "urgent" and "banjo-fueled". It reached number No. 77 on the Billboard Hot 100 and No. 34 on the Adult Contemporary chart in 1974. It was a slightly bigger hit in Canada, where it reached No. 61.

The country-flavored song has been covered by both Earl Scruggs and Dolly Parton. Parton's version was nominated for a Grammy Award for Best Female Country Vocal Performance in 2001.

== Lyrics and music ==
Joel wrote "Travelin' Prayer" about two years before it appeared on the album. The song has four verses, the first of which is later repeated, and two instrumental breaks. The lyrics offer a prayer that the singer's lover be protected until she returns to the singer. The song has elements of country music, and is taken at a brisk pace. Instrumentation includes honky-tonk piano, banjo, bass, violin and drums, the latter of which are played with brushes using just a snare and bass drum. The drummer has a fixated smile throughout the whole song. Joel plays mouth harp during the second instrumental break. Author Ken Bielen sees the song as being influenced by a traditional Irish blessing for an easy return home. Bielen also notes that the song fits with a trend during the period in which religious images were often used in popular songs. Author Hank Bordowitz describes the song as a "pop-grass on-the-road-again song." Bordowitz particularly praises the banjo playing of Eric Weissberg.

== Reception ==
Billboard regarded "Travelin' Prayer" as Joel's "best single effort yet," praising the banjo arrangement and the contrast between the prayer-like lyrics and the fast tempo of the song. Cash Box called it "an up-tempo bluegrass flavored tune" with "the same dynamism that 'Piano Man' exhibited", saying that "Billy's voice is powerful and his piano work is really sensational" and "his technique is clean and polished." Record World said that it's "a result of strong across-the-dials feedback on this powerful cut" which "translates [Joel's] live excitement into hot, hot wax."

== Cover versions ==
"Travelin' Prayer" was covered by Earl Scruggs Revue in 1973 on the album Rockin' Cross the Country. Billboard rated it as one of the "best cuts" on the album. It later earned Dolly Parton a Grammy Award Nomination for Best Female Country Vocal Performance, when she covered it in 1999 on the album The Grass Is Blue. CMJ noted the song as a "recommended track."

Parton has stated that she "always loved Billy Joel's 'Travelin' Prayer', which [she] thought lent itself to pure bluegrass." The CMJ New Music Report confirmed that Parton's arrangement transforms the song into a "legitimate bluegrass tune." AllMusic critic Philip Van Vleck agrees that it works as a bluegrass song. Author Ken Bielen notes that "Parton recognizes the roots music element" of the song. Bielen notes that Parton's version begins with a slow violin introduction that lasts almost a minute, but the rest of the song goes at "pedal to the metal" speed. In addition to the violin, Parton's backing instruments include banjo, dobro, mandolin, guitar and upright bass.

Holly Dunn covered the song in her Across the Rio Grande album in 1988 though the song was not released.

== Chart positions ==
| Chart (1974) | Peak position |
|---|---|
| Canadian Singles Chart | 61 |
| U.S. Billboard Hot 100 | 77 |
| U.S. Billboard Hot Adult Contemporary Tracks | 34 |
