= Rhys Clark =

American drummer

- Born: Rhys Edward Clark; 17 September 1946 (age 79)
- Origin: Auckland, New Zealand
- Occupation: Drummer
- Years active: 1963–present
- Formerly of: The Executives

Rhys Edward Clark (born 17 September 1946) is a New Zealand drummer who, since moving to the United States in 1970, has played with such artists as Hoyt Axton, Freddy Fender and, most notably, Billy Joel.

== Biography ==
Clark's career as a drummer began when he was a teenager in New Zealand. In 1963, he became the drummer for the Zodiacs, followed by a 1964 stint with The Chequers. In 1965, he joined the Auckland-based pop band, The Silhouettes, who had a number of local hits, as well as a national hit with "Theme From The Endless Summer". He was also a founding member of the very successful Australian pop band, The Executives. Between 1966 and 1969, the Executives had a number of hit records, performed throughout Australia, and appeared on many television shows, including their own nationwide television specials, as well as in a number of commercials for such companies as Coca-Cola, Qantas, P&O and Revlon. In 1969, the Executives recorded an album in the United States, but they disbanded shortly thereafter. Some of the band members returned to Australia, but Clark stayed in the States and became a Los Angeles-based session musician.

Between 1971 and 1975, Clark toured with Billy Joel and worked on his albums Cold Spring Harbor and Piano Man. Clark was also the drummer on Joel's breakthrough Sigma Sound radio concert, broadcast on WMMR-FM in April 1972, as well as at the Mar y Sol Festival two weeks prior, where they played to a crowd of 50,000. After his time with Joel, Clark ultimately hooked up with Hoyt Axton, and toured and recorded with him from 1979 through 1999. In the 1990s, he also began touring with Freddy Fender, as well as the Texas Tornados, which he did until Fender died in late 2006. Since 2006, Clark has performed with a number of artists, such as Johnny Rodriguez, Sam the Sham, Charlie Rich Jr., Jann Browne, Chris Gaffney, Sweethearts of the Rodeo, Rosie Flores, Wanda Jackson, Michael Chain and Rick Shea.

In September, 2013, Clark reunited with his former Billy Joel bandmates, Larry Russell and Don Evans, along with singers/piano players, David Clark and Elio Pace, to re-create the WMMR/Sigma Sound concert that jump-started Joel's career. They did two sold-out performances of "Long Long Time: A Historic Tribute to Billy Joel", in New York, and in Philadelphia where the original show was broadcast.

== Partial discography ==
ALBUMS

- 1967 – The Executives – The Executives
- 1968 – The Executives – The Executives on Bandstand
- 1968 – The Executives – ...Now!
- 1970 – The Executives – Inner Sense
- 1971 – Kyle – Times That Try A Man's Soul
- 1971 – Burton & Cunico – Strive, Seek, Find
- 1971 – Billy Joel – Cold Spring Harbor
- 1972 – Peter Anders – Peter Anders
- 1972 – Captain Beefheart – The Spotlight Kid
- 1973 – Billy Joel – Piano Man
- 1981 – Hoyt Axton – Live!
- 1981 – Hoyt Axton – Silk Cut Festival
- 1982 – Hoyt Axton – Pistol Packin' Mama
- 1984 – Hoyt Axton – American Dreams
- 1985 – Billy Joel – Greatest Hits: Volume I & Volume II
- 1986 – Hoyt Axton – Greatest Hits
- 1988 – Re Winkler, Anne Harvey, Ree Van Vleck – A Town South of Bakersfield, Vol. 2
- 1989 – The Executives – The Happening World of the Executives: The Festival File Vol. 12
- 1989 – Billy Joel – Souvenir: The Ultimate Collection
- 1990 – Hoyt Axton – Spin of the Wheel
- 1991 – Jann Browne – It Only Hurts When I Laugh
- 1991 – Billy Truitt & The Barnstormers – Billy Truitt & The Barnstormers
- 1997 – Billy Joel – Complete Hits Collection 1973–1997
- 1998 – The Executives – So You Wanna Be A Rock 'N' Roll Star
- 2000 – Gailyn Addis – Gailyn Addis
- 2001 – Billy Joel – The Essential Billy Joel
- 2002 – Billy Joel – The Collection
- 2002 – The Executives – Peculiar Hole in the Sky: Pop Psych From Down Under
- 2004 – The Silhouettes – Very Best of Kiwi Instrumentals
- 2004 – Billy Joel – Piano Man: The Very Best of Billy Joel
- 2004 – Chris DeMarco – Lost And Found
- 2005 – Billy Joel – My Lives
- 2007 – Rio Rocko – Rio Rocko
- 2011 – Billy Joel – Billy Joel: The Complete Albums
- 2011 – Billy Joel – Piano Man (Legacy Edition)
- 2013 – Billy Joel – Original Album Classics

EPS

- 1967 – The Executives – The Executives Break Out
- 1968 – The Executives – It's A Happening World
- 1968 – The Executives – Windy Day
- 1969 – The Executives – Parenthesis
- 1969 – The Executives – Things Go Better With Coca-Cola

SINGLES

- 1965 – The Silhouettes – "Theme From The Endless Summer" / "P.S. I Love You"
- 1965 – The Silhouettes – "Yes It's Time" / "Milkman"
- 1966 – The Silhouettes – "There She Is" / "Where Have You Been All My Life"
- 1966 – The Executives – "Wander Boy" / "You're Bad"
- 1967 – The Executives – "My Aim Is To Please You" / "Bad Reputation"
- 1967 – The Executives – "Sit Down, I Think I Love You" / "Don't You Sometimes, Baby, Find That I'm on Your Mind"
- 1968 – The Executives – "It's A Happening World" / "Moving in a Circle"
- 1968 – The Executives – "Windy Day" / "This Town Ain't The Same Any More"
- 1969 – The Executives – "Christopher Robin" / "Summerhill Road"
- 1969 – The Executives – "Parenthesis" / "Got My Woman"
- 1970 – Frank Day Habit – "Hey Man" / "You're Gonna Love Me"
