= The Entertainer (Billy Joel song) =

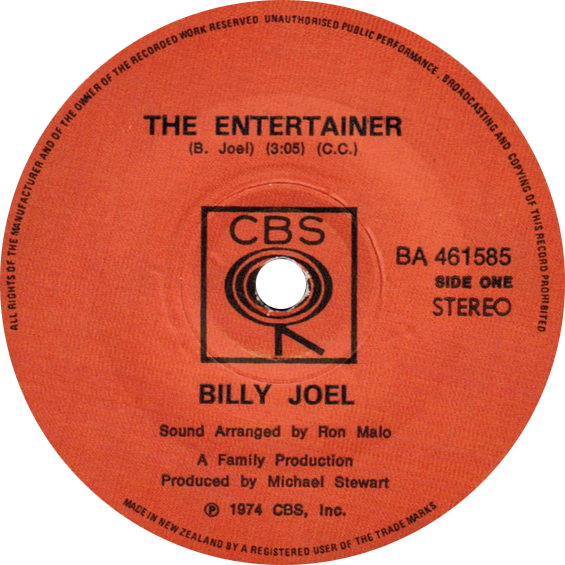
- Side A of the New Zealand single

Single by Billy Joel

from the album Streetlife Serenade
- B-side: "The Mexican Connection"
- Released: November 1974
- Recorded: Devonshire Sound, Hollywood, California
- Genre: Rock and roll; folk rock; pop rock
- Length: 3:41 (album version); 3:11 (single version)
- Label: Columbia
- Songwriter: Billy Joel
- Producer: Michael Stewart

Billy Joel singles chronology
"The Ballad of Billy the Kid" (1974)	"The Entertainer" (1974)	"Say Goodbye to Hollywood" (1976)

"The Entertainer" is a single by singer Billy Joel released as the only single from his 1974 album Streetlife Serenade. The song peaked at No. 34 on the US charts. The song is a cynical and somewhat satirical look at the fleeting fame of a musician and fickle public tastes ("Today I am your champion / I may have won your hearts / But I know the game / You'll forget my name / (And I won't be here / in another year) / if I don't stay on the charts"); this theme would be examined in the later song "It's Still Rock and Roll to Me".

== Composition and release ==
One verse in the song references the shortening of Joel's song "Piano Man" from 5 minutes and 40 seconds to 3 minutes and 5 seconds to fit a radio slot, referenced by the lyrics "It was a beautiful song, / but it ran too long / (If you're gonna have a hit, you gotta make it fit) / So they cut it down to 3:05." Additionally, the timing printed on the label of the 7" release of "The Entertainer" was 3:05, although the actual 45 length was 3:11 (while the album length was 3:41). In the single version, verse 3 (which starts at 1:02 in the album version) is edited out, and verse 2 (which starts at 0:40) contains a steel guitar in its second half, which is actually featured in the second half of the third verse in the album version; indeed, on the single mix, the instrumental crescendo of the album version is anticipated by bringing the fuller instrumentation of verse 3 under the vocals of verse 2. As a result of this, the slightly emptier original instrumentation of verse 2 (which includes a downward slide on the synth) and the vocals of verse 3 are completely omitted, while the instrumentation of verse 3 (featuring the steel guitar) does appear, but earlier.

On some of the singles released for "The Entertainer" the song was b-sided with "The Mexican Connection".

Billboard regarded it as one of the "best cuts" from Streetlife Serenade. Cash Box called it "positively the strongest disk Billy has cut since 'Piano Man'" and said that "the lyric line abounds with the incisive cynicism that the biz can generate in a performer" and praised the "strong instrumentation and synthesizer." Record World called it a "clever cut" in which Joel "returns with a glint in his eye and sarcasm on his lips: it's tough at the top, but even more treacherous on the way up."

An extra verse, between the 3rd and 5th verses, was omitted from Streetlife Serenade but can often be heard in Joel's live performances of the song.

== Chart history ==
Chart (1974–77)	Peak position
Australia (Kent Music Report)	89
Canadian Singles Chart	30
U.S. Billboard Hot 100	34
U.S. Billboard Easy Listening	30
