= The Ballad of Billy the Kid =

Single by Billy Joel

from the album Piano Man
- B-side: "If I Only Had the Words (To Tell You)"
- Released: April 1974
- Recorded: 1973
- Length: 5:35
- Label: Columbia / Philips (initial UK release)
- Songwriter: Billy Joel
- Producer: Michael Stewart

Billy Joel singles chronology
| "Travelin' Prayer" (1974) | "The Ballad of Billy the Kid" (1974) | "The Entertainer" (1975) |

"The Ballad of Billy the Kid" is a song by American singer-songwriter Billy Joel from the album Piano Man. It was also issued as a single in the UK backed with "If I Only Had The Words (To Tell You)".

== Artistic license ==
The song is Joel's fictionalized version of the story of Billy the Kid. In an interview from 1975, Joel admitted, "Basically [the song] was an experiment with an impressionist type of lyric. It was historically totally inaccurate as a story."

Examples of these inaccuracies include when Joel sings that Billy the Kid was "from a town known as Wheeling, West Virginia" and that "he robbed his way from Utah to Oklahoma". The real Billy the Kid never robbed a bank and although his birthplace is uncertain, no account suggests that he was from West Virginia. The song also says that Billy the Kid was captured and hanged, with many people attending the hanging; in reality, he was shot and killed by Pat Garrett.

== Background ==
In the last verse of the song, the lyrics switch from Billy the Kid to a "Billy" from Oyster Bay, Long Island. The writer Ken Bielen has interpreted the "Billy" in the final verse as being a portrait of Billy Joel himself since Joel was from Oyster Bay. However, in the liner notes to his album Songs in the Attic Joel claims that the "Billy" in the final verse is not himself but rather a bartender who worked in Oyster Bay, by the name of Billy Nastri.

In an interview, Billy Joel mentioned that this song was about "record company PR hype". The lyrics may have been inspired in part by the liner notes from his earlier two-man album Attila, which go on and on about the historic Attila the Hun, and then conclude, "Attila – the hottest band to come along since the Huns sacked Europe".

== Influences ==
According to one of Joel's unofficial biographers, Hank Bordowitz, the instrumentation of "The Ballad of Billy the Kid" has details reminiscent of the composers Aaron Copland and Ennio Morricone. Copland himself wrote the music for a ballet titled Billy The Kid.

== Live versions ==
The song was a concert staple from 1974–1979. In 1981, Joel's song was released in a live version on the album Songs in the Attic. The live version was used as the B-side to the live single of "She's Got a Way". Another live version of the song was released on Live at Shea Stadium: The Concert in 2011. Still another live version was also included on Disc 1 of Joel's 12 Gardens Live album, issued in 2006.

== Critical reception ==
Critical response to the song has been mixed. In The New Rolling Stone Album Guide, Paul Evans called "The Ballad of Billy the Kid" one of the "ambitious story songs" on Piano Man and Dennis Hunt of The Los Angeles Times agreed that the song showed Joel's "knack for story songs". But other critics have dismissed the song. For example, The New York Times critic Laura Sinagra called the song a "bombastic throwaway" and Tom Phalen of The Seattle Times was also critical of the song, arguing that Joel's "outlaw" character doesn't match Joel's light, catchy "Marlboro Man melodies". Bordowitz comments on the "interesting, if somewhat jejune parallel" in the lyrics between a teenage rebel in the 1800s American West and in the 1900s American suburbs.

== Pop culture reference ==
"The Ballad of Billy the Kid" is featured during the Family Guy episode "Dial Meg for Murder".
