= Scenes from an Italian Restaurant =

Song by Billy Joel

from the album The Stranger
- Released: September 1977
- Recorded: A & R Recording, New York City
- Genre: Jazz rock; pop rock
- Length: 7:37
- Label: Columbia
- Songwriter: Billy Joel
- Producer: Phil Ramone

Music video
- "Scenes from an Italian Restaurant" on YouTube

"Scenes from an Italian Restaurant" is a song from Billy Joel's 1977 album The Stranger.

It has been described as "a characteristic Joel observation on New York life". In 2021, Rolling Stone magazine ranked it the 324th greatest song of all time. The song was also described as "a seven-minute epic" by American Songwriter.

== Release ==
The back cover of The Stranger LP depicting the band members seated at the former Guido's Restaurant in Manhattan. However, this restaurant was not the inspiration for the song (See: Joel's comments).

Although never released as a single, it became one of Joel's most celebrated compositions among fans and critics alike. It appears on most of his compilation albums and is a live favorite. In an interview, Joel cited the second side of The Beatles' album Abbey Road as one of its primary musical influences. At 7 minutes and 37 seconds, it is the longest of Joel's rock music studio cuts, only surpassed by live recordings and five tracks from Joel's 2001 classical album Fantasies & Delusions.

When Joel first performed the song, at the C.W. Post Campus of Long Island University in New York state on May 6, 1977, he dedicated it to Christiano's restaurant (now closed) in the nearby hamlet of Syosset. However, in 2012 Joel admitted this "was like saying 'Yankees' when you're playing in New York", and that he referenced the local establishment merely to gain applause. Later, he stated that the track was inspired by a "couple of places": Fontana di Trevi on West 57th Street, opposite Carnegie Hall in New York city, and Benito Two (or possibly Il Cortile) on Mulberry Street in Little Italy, Manhattan.

A recording of Joel's performance at the C. W. Post Campus was released on streaming services in July 2025, as part of a 155-track playlist to accompany the two-part HBO documentary Billy Joel: And So It Goes.

== Composition and analysis ==
A "careful and considerate juxtaposition of different musical idioms", the track is effectively a medley of three distinct pieces (actually fragments of unfinished songs). According to Joel, it was recorded as one composition in "about seven takes", with himself and the other musicians playing together live in the studio. It begins as a gentle, melodic piano ballad depicting, in the first person, a scene of two old classmates reuniting in an Italian restaurant. This segues into a triumphant and uptempo jazz-influenced section as the classmates catch up with each other's lives and begin to reminisce. Clarinet, trombone, tuba and saxophone solos then lead into a rock and roll section (which Joel calls "The Ballad of Brenda and Eddie"). This section tells a story in the third person about high school sweethearts who were an "it" couple, who marry young and quickly divorce.

The tempo then slows as the song transitions back to the style of the first section and the two part fondly, with one character remarking "I'll meet you anytime you want / At our Italian restaurant." Producer Phil Ramone noted that the track was mixed with minimal use of equalization, so that the bass and drums sounded "focussed and tight", whilst the cymbals could "ring without sounding harsh".

The song consists of five parts (Introduction, Transition and Dixieland Jazz, Piano Solo, The Ballad of Brenda and Eddie, Outro), each lasting a separate amount of time.

=== Introduction (Italian restaurant) (0:00–1:43) ===
The song starts with a piano introduction in the style of a medium ballad (70 bpm). The first lines "A bottle of white, a bottle of red" are told in a first person and set up the scene of an Italian restaurant. Joel himself remarked that this is used as a framing story, with friends reminiscing on the good old days. The lines "I'll meet you anytime you want / In our Italian restaurant" ends this section and transitions to a saxophone solo played by Richie Cannata on a tenor saxophone. It is used as a transition piece between entering the restaurant and the discussion.

=== Transition and Dixieland jazz (1:44–2:47) ===
The tempo increases to about 95 bpm with a staccato piano driving forward. The narrator tells the others that "Things are okay with me these days / I got a good job, I got a good office." This is small talk before they continue and discuss the past. With the lines "Do you remember those days hanging out at the village green?" the style changes to Dixieland jazz. Joel makes a reference to this style change in the lines "You dropped a dime in the box and played a song about New Orleans", referring to where the style of music originated. A soprano saxophone melody is played over traditional Dixieland instrumentals such as tuba, clarinet, and trombone.

=== Piano solo (2:48–3:02) ===
The piano solo is a fast-paced piece used as a transition between the framing story of the Italian restaurant and their high school days. Joel uses alternating octaves in the bass and plays a descending melody in the right hand.

=== The Ballad of Brenda and Eddie (3:03–5:59) ===
Having a runtime of 2 minutes 34 seconds, this is the longest section. It originally had a working title of "Things are OK in Oyster Bay" (became: "Things are OK with me these days). The narrator (in third person) discusses a high school romance between Brenda and Eddie, and their later relationship. Initially, their relationship seemed promising, proving to be popular during their years in high school ("Brenda and Eddie were... king and queen of the prom") and decided to arrange a wedding (even though peers called the idea ridiculous). After the wedding, the relationship began to slowly deteriorate after the couple began to experience financial troubles, leading to their eventual amicable divorce (the narrator calls the couple "the closest of friends" during and after the divorce). He laments the loss of his old friends ("you can never go back there again"). The narrator then closes the section by claiming it is all he remembers ("can't tell you more"). According to one analysis, "Brenda and Eddie themselves are not very important, but they give the author an opportunity to reflect on various stages of his life, to examine his present by revisiting his past."

=== Outro (6:00–7:37) ===
The transition to the final section includes a grandiose string section which then diminishes back to piano and the style of the introduction, indicating that the song is now back to the Italian restaurant. The final lyrics solidify that we are back in this time period. The song ends with a saxophone solo similar to the first.

== Personnel ==
- Billy Joel – lead and backing vocals, acoustic piano
- Dominic Cortese – accordion
- Steve Burgh – electric lead guitar
- Hugh McCracken – acoustic rhythm guitar
- Doug Stegmeyer – bass
- Liberty DeVitto – drums
- Richie Cannata – saxophones, flute, clarinet

== Legacy ==
=== Reception ===
The song has been highly acclaimed in retrospective reviews. Scott Floman, music critic for Goldmine magazine, described the song as an "epic multi-sectioned masterpiece which starts as a slow smoky ballad, builds up to a jaunty piano rocker with a New Orleans flavor that also shows off Joel's knack for telling stories and creating rhymes, before finally returning to smoky ballad territory again."

Record World regarded it as the "centerpiece" of The Stranger. Michael Galluci of Ultimate Classic Rock described the song as "one of his [Joel's] greatest musical and lyrical achievements."

It is ranked number 324 on Rolling Stone's list of The 500 Greatest Songs of All Time.

=== Joel's comments ===
After years of speculation about exactly which restaurant inspired the song, Joel stated in an interview included on 2008's The Stranger 30th Anniversary Edition DVD that the song was written about Fontana di Trevi, a restaurant across from Carnegie Hall, which he frequented during a series of June 1977 concerts. The song's signature line: "A bottle of red, a bottle of white, whatever kind of mood you're in tonight" was actually spoken to him by a waiter at Fontana di Trevi while Joel ordered. He has further stated that the restaurant in the story has more than one real-life counterpart; however, Fontana di Trevi was on his mind while he was writing the song.

In an interview on The Late Show with Stephen Colbert, Joel named this song as his favorite of his own compositions.

=== Movin' Out ===
The characters of Brenda and Eddie from this song became major characters in the 2002 Broadway production Movin' Out. The song tells the tale of the two through their love in high school, their marriage, and finally to their divorce shortly after. Movin' Out tells this story among others, although with a slight lyrical change, as the Brenda-and-Eddie story in Movin' Out takes place in 1965 instead of 1975.

== Certifications ==
Region	Certification	Certified units/sales
United States (RIAA)	Platinum	1,000,000^{‡}
^{‡} Sales+streaming figures based on certification alone.

== See also ==
- Billy Joel discography
