= Songs in the Attic =

Live album by Billy Joel
- Released: September 14, 1981
- Recorded: June–July 1980 during Glass Houses tour
- Genre: Pop rock
- Length: 48:00
- Label: Family Productions/Columbia
- Producer: Phil Ramone

Billy Joel chronology
Glass Houses (1980)	Songs in the Attic (1981)	The Nylon Curtain (1982)

Billy Joel live chronology
Songs in the Attic (1981)	Kohuept (1987)

Singles from Songs in the Attic
- 1. "Say Goodbye to Hollywood (Live)" Released: September 1981; 2. "You're My Home (Live)" Released: November 1981 (UK); 3. "She's Got a Way (Live)" Released: November 1981

Professional ratings
Review scores
Source	Rating
AllMusic	4/5 stars
Rolling Stone	4/5 stars
Rolling Stone Album Guide, 3rd Edition	2.5/5 stars

Songs in the Attic is the first live album by Billy Joel, released in 1981.

At the time of its release, it was the first widely available appearance of music from his first album, Cold Spring Harbor, released in 1971.

== History ==
In the liner notes, Joel writes that Songs in the Attic introduced his earlier work to fans who had come to know his work after The Stranger. In that earlier work, most of the instruments were played by session musicians while Joel himself sang and played piano, keyboards, and harmonica. But by the late 1970s, Joel had a fairly consistent touring/recording band and wanted to showcase his songs as played by his band.

The single-releases included: "Say Goodbye to Hollywood", which peaked at #17 on the U. S. Billboard Hot 100; and "She's Got a Way", which reached #23 on the same chart; and "You're My Home".

Five promotional music videos were filmed: four of them recorded at Sparks Saloon in Huntington, NY, and one in a recording studio. Three were released as worldwide official singles. "Everybody Loves You Now" (not a single) directed by Steve Cohen (live at Sparks); "You're My Home" directed by Steve Cohen (live at Sparks); "Los Angelenos" (not a single, though a Japanese 7" vinyl was in existence) directed by Steve Cohen (live at Sparks); "Say Goodbye to Hollywood" directed by Steve Cohen (live at Sparks); "She's Got a Way" live in a studio.

== Track listing ==
All songs written by Billy Joel.

Side one
No.	Title	Recording date and location	Length
1.	"Miami 2017 (Seen the Lights Go Out on Broadway)"	June 24, 1980, at Madison Square Garden, New York, NY	5:05
2.	"Summer, Highland Falls"	July 23, 1980, at The Bayou, Washington, D.C.	3:03
3.	"Streetlife Serenader"	July 20, 1980, at St. Paul Civic Center, St. Paul, MN	5:17
4.	"Los Angelenos"	July 10, 1980, at Toad's Place, New Haven, CT	3:48
5.	"She's Got a Way"	June 20, 1980 at Paradise Club, Boston, MA	3:00
6.	"Everybody Loves You Now"	July 23, 1980, at The Bayou, Washington, D.C.	3:08

Side two
No.	Title	Recording date and location	Length
7.	"Say Goodbye to Hollywood"	July 14, 1980, at Milwaukee Arena, Milwaukee, WI	4:25
8.	"Captain Jack"	July 5, 1980, at The Spectrum, Philadelphia, PA	7:16
9.	"You're My Home"	July 23, 1980, at The Bayou, Washington, D.C.	3:07
10.	"The Ballad of Billy the Kid"	June 24, 1980, at Madison Square Garden, New York, NY	5:28
11.	"I've Loved These Days"	July 16, 1980, at Horizon, Chicago, IL	4:35
Total length:			48:00

== Personnel ==
- Billy Joel – vocals, piano, synthesizer, harmonica
- David Brown – lead guitar, acoustic guitar
- Russell Javors – rhythm guitar, acoustic guitar
- Doug Stegmeyer – bass
- Richie Cannata – saxophone, organ
- Liberty DeVitto – drums, percussion

=== Technical ===
- Produced by Phil Ramone
- Engineered by Jim Boyer, Bradshaw Leigh, and Larry Franke
- Mixed by Elliot Scheiner and Jim Boyer
- Remixed by Phil Ramone
- Mastered by Ted Jensen at Sterling Sound, NYC
- Design – Paula Scher
- Photography – Dan Weaks

== Charts ==
=== Weekly charts ===
Chart (1981–82)	Peak position
Australian (Kent Music Report)	9
Canadian Albums (RPM)	21
Japanese Albums (Oricon)	3
New Zealand Albums (RIANZ)	30
Norwegian Albums (VG-lista)	12
Swedish Albums (Sverigetopplistan)	38
UK Albums (OCC)	57
US Billboard 200	8
West German Albums (Media Control)	51

=== Year-end charts ===
Chart (1981)	Position
Australian Albums Chart	53
Canadian Albums Chart	69
Chart (1982)	Position
US Billboard 200	98

=== Certifications/Sales ===
Region	Certification	Certified units/sales
Japan (Oricon Charts)	—	286,000
United States (RIAA)	3× Platinum	3,000,000^{^}
^{^} Shipments figures based on certification alone.
