= Piano Man (Billy Joel album) =

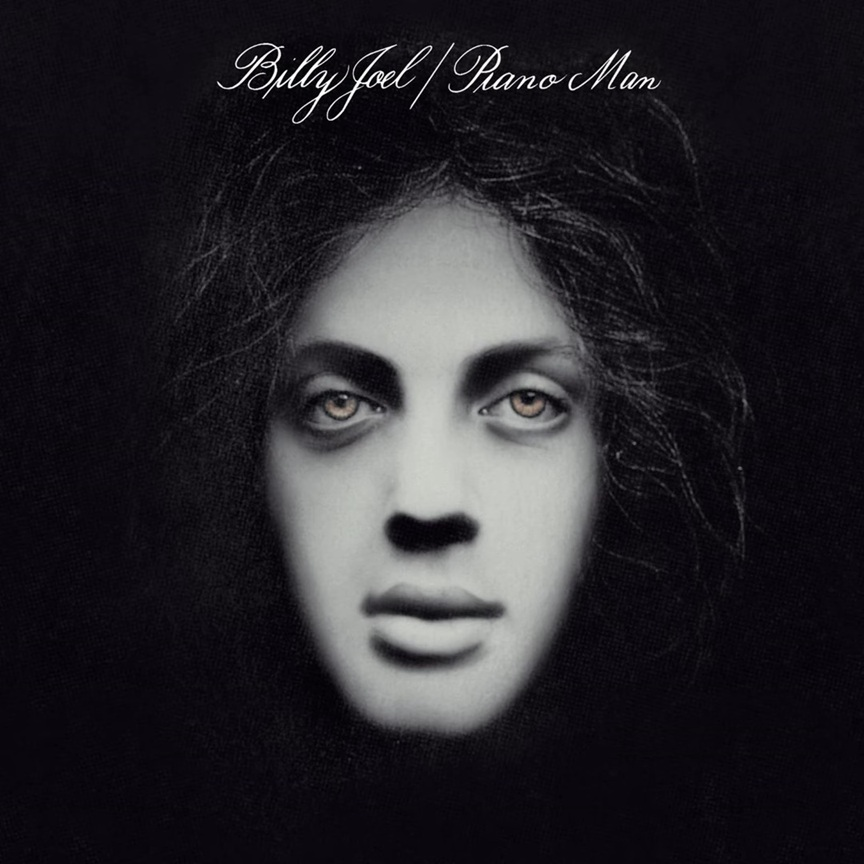

Studio album by Billy Joel
- Released: November 14, 1973
- Recorded: September 1973
- Studios: Devonshire, Los Angeles, California
- Genres: Pop rock; soft rock; country rock; folk rock
- Length: 42:51
- Label: Family Productions/Columbia
- Producer: Michael Stewart

Billy Joel chronology
Cold Spring Harbor (1971)	Piano Man (1973)	Streetlife Serenade (1974)

Singles from Piano Man
- 1. "Piano Man" Released: November 2, 1973; 2. "The Ballad of Billy the Kid" Released: April 1974 (UK); 3. "Worse Comes to Worst" Released: June 1974; 4. "Travelin' Prayer" Released: August 1974

Piano Man is the second studio album by American recording artist Billy Joel, released on November 14, 1973, by Columbia Records. The album emerged from legal difficulties with Joel's former label, Family Productions. It was initially planned to be released in the UK in May 1974 by Philips but ended up being released there in April 1975 by CBS.

The title track, a fictionalized retelling of Joel's experiences with people he met as a lounge singer in Los Angeles, peaked at No. 25 on the US Billboard Hot 100 and No. 4 on the Adult Contemporary singles chart. "Travelin' Prayer" and "Worse Comes to Worst" peaked at No. 77 and 80 on the Hot 100, respectively, while the album itself peaked at No. 27 on the US Billboard 200. The album was certified gold by the RIAA in 1975, but Joel received only $8,000 in royalties (US$47,866 in 2025 dollars).

== Legacy edition ==
Columbia Records released a two-disc legacy version of Piano Man in November 2011.

This edition features a somewhat abbreviated live 1972 broadcast from Philadelphia's Philadelphia 93.3 WMMR FM radio, capturing early performances by Joel recorded at Sigma Sound Studios in Philadelphia. This particular broadcast was instrumental in catalyzing Joel's musical career. Following the recording of the show, the live rendition of "Captain Jack" became a staple on the station, ultimately becoming the most requested song in WMMR's history. The burgeoning popularity of this live recording attracted the attention of Columbia Records executives, who subsequently offered Joel a recording contract. Additionally, the broadcast included three tracks—"Long, Long Time", "Josephine", and "Rosalinda"—which were not featured on any of Joel's studio albums.

== Critical reception ==
Professional ratings
Review scores
Source	Rating
AllMusic	4/5 stars
Christgau's Record Guide	C
Creem	D+
Disc	4/4 stars
The Guardian	3/5 stars
Rolling Stone	positive
Ultimate Classic Rock	3/5 stars

Rolling Stone mused that Piano Man "represents a new seriousness and flexibility" for Joel, comparing it to the stylings of Elton John. Reviewing the album, Billboard stated that it shows that Joel has a "fine shot at establishing himself as consistent quality AM artist with large scale songs and dynamic performing range".

== Track listing ==
=== Original release ===
All songs written by Billy Joel.

Side one
No.	Title	Length
1.	"Travelin' Prayer"	4:16
2.	"Piano Man"	5:37
3.	"Ain't No Crime"	3:20
4.	"You're My Home"	3:14
5.	"The Ballad of Billy the Kid"	5:35

Side two
No.	Title	Length
6.	"Worse Comes to Worst"	3:28
7.	"Stop in Nevada"	3:40
8.	"If I Only Had the Words (To Tell You)"	3:35
9.	"Somewhere Along the Line"	3:17
10.	"Captain Jack"	7:15
Total length:		42:51

=== 2011 Legacy Edition bonus disc ===
Disc 2: Live at Sigma Sound Studios, Philadelphia, Pennsylvania, April 15, 1972

1. "Introduction by Ed Sciaky" – 0:29
2. "Falling of the Rain" – 2:33
3. "Intro to Travelin' Prayer" – 0:17
4. "Travelin' Prayer" – 3:11
5. "Intro to Billy the Kid" – 0:50
6. "The Ballad of Billy the Kid" – 5:36
7. "Intro to She's Got a Way" – 1:03
8. "She's Got a Way" – 3:08
9. "Intro to Everybody Loves You Now" – 1:19
10. "Everybody Loves You Now" – 2:56
11. "Intro to Nocturne" – 0:59
12. "Nocturne" – 2:46
13. "Station ID and Intro to Turn Around" – 1:31
14. "Turn Around" – 3:26
15. "Intro to Long, Long Time" – 1:19
16. "Long, Long Time" – 4:46
17. "Intro to Captain Jack" – 1:19
18. "Captain Jack" – 6:56
19. "Intro to Josephine" – 1:40
20. "Josephine" – 3:23
21. "Intro to Rosalinda" – 0:33
22. "Rosalinda" – 3:03
23. "Tomorrow Is Today" – 5:11

== Personnel ==
Adapted from the AllMusic credits.

- Billy Joel – vocals, acoustic and electric pianos, organ, harmonica
- Michael Omartian – accordion, arrangements (tracks 1–4, 6–10)
- Jimmie Haskell – arrangements (track 5)
- Richard Bennett, Larry Carlton, and Dean Parks – guitars
- Eric Weissberg – banjo, pedal steel guitar
- Fred Heilbrun – banjo
- Wilton Felder, and Emory Gordy Jr. – bass guitar
- Ron Tutt – drums (tracks 1–9)
- Rhys Clark – drums (track 10)
- Billy Armstrong – violin
- Laura Creamer, Mark Creamer, and Susan Steward – backing vocals

Live at Sigma Sound Studios, April 15, 1972

- Billy Joel – piano, harmonica, vocals
- Al Hertzberg – acoustic and electric guitars
- Larry Russell – bass guitar
- Rhys Clark – drums
- Dennis Wilen – producer

Production

- Michael Stewart – producer
- Ron Malo – engineer
- Ted Jensen – remastering
- Beverly Parker – design
- Bill Imhofe – illustration

== Charts ==
=== Weekly charts ===
Chart (1974–1976)	Peak position
Australia (Kent Music Report)	3
Canadian Albums (RPM)	26
US Billboard 200	27
Chart (1984)	Position
UK Albums (OCC)	98
Chart (2011)	Position
Japanese Albums (Oricon)	112
Chart (2013)	Position
Irish Albums (IRMA)	75
Chart (2020)	Position
Belgian Albums (Ultratop Flanders)	192
Greek Albums (IFPI)	6

=== Year-end charts ===
Chart (1974)	Position
US Billboard 200	56
Chart (1976)	Position
Australia (Kent Music Report)	16

== Certifications ==
Region	Certification	Certified units/sales
Australia (ARIA)	Platinum	50,000^{^}
Canada (Music Canada)	2× Platinum	200,000^{^}
New Zealand (RMNZ)	Gold	7,500^{‡}
United States (RIAA)	5× Platinum	5,000,000^{‡}
^{^} Shipments figures based on certification alone.^{‡} Sales+streaming figures based on certification alone.
