= She's Got a Way =

- Single release of the 1980 live recording

Single by Billy Joel

from the album Cold Spring Harbor and Songs in the Attic
- B-side: "Everybody Loves You Now" (1971); "The Ballad of Billy the Kid" (1981)
- Released: November 1971 (studio release); November 1981 (live re-release)
- Recorded: July 1971
- Studio: Record Plant Studios, Los Angeles
- Genre: Soft rock
- Length: 2:50 (studio); 3:00 (live)
- Label: Family Productions (U.S.); Philips (UK); Columbia (live re-release)
- Songwriter: Billy Joel
- Producers: Artie Ripp; Phil Ramone (live re-recording)

Billy Joel singles chronology
"She's Got a Way" (1971)	"Piano Man" (1973)
"Say Goodbye to Hollywood (Live)" (1981)	"She's Got a Way (Live)" (1981)	"Pressure" (1982)

Audio
- "She's Got a Way" (studio, 1973) on YouTube
- "She's Got a Way" (live, 1980) on YouTube

"She's Got a Way" is a song by American singer-songwriter Billy Joel, originally released on his first studio album, Cold Spring Harbor (1971) as the opening track and as a single from that album in some countries. It was also featured as a single from the 1981 live album Songs in the Attic, peaking at number 23 on the Billboard Hot 100 chart in early 1982.

== Lyrics and music ==
"She's Got a Way" is a love ballad. The lyrics to "She's Got a Way" have the singer describing how various characteristics of a particular woman, such as her laugh, make him love her, even though he can't understand why. To music critic Mark Bego, it's a song about a woman who has "mesmerized" him. Joel biographer Fred Schruers describes the lyrics as a "plainspoken, never-quite-corny adoration of a loved one".

According to a friend of the couple, Bruce Gentile, the song was written about Joel's first wife Elizabeth. Joel's liner notes for Songs in the Attic seem to agree with this, commenting, "Written in 1970, I still feel the same way."

Schruers describes the song's melody as alternating between "surging" and "relenting". The original studio version has minimal instrumentation. The most prominent instruments are Joel's piano and some cymbal crashes. Schruers describes Joel's piano playing as "stately". Cash Box described it as "a slow, but never plodding love song". On the 1983 reissue of Cold Spring Harbor, "She's Got a Way" also incorporated strings, which may have been inspired by a live performance at Carnegie Hall in New York City at which strings were included in the instrumentation. Schruers attributes some of the effect of the song to the way Joel sings the final word of the final phrase "I don't know what it is/But there doesn't have to be a reason anyway." Schruers describes the last word "anyway" as hanging in the air, "trailing off" and "disrupting the tempo" and thus "seemingly giving in to the emotion" of love.

In a 1981 interview, Joel expressed mixed feelings about the song: "I thought it was cornball for years. I had trouble singing it at first. Then I got into it and decided everybody has a corny side, I suppose".

Joel originally included "She's Got a Way" on a five-song demo tape that included other songs that would appear on Cold Spring Harbor, such as "Everybody Loves You Now" and "Tomorrow Is Today". Joel made the tape in an unsuccessful attempt to secure his first solo recording contract with Paramount Records.

== Critical reception ==
AllMusic critic Stephen Thomas Erlewine described the studio version as being "lovely" and rated it as one of Joel's "finest songs". Record World called it a "pretty debut". Bego described it as a "beautiful love ballad" and one of Joel's "most serious and adult compositions". Joel biographer Hank Bordowitz called it a "remarkable composition that, while not great, at least indicate[d] a rising talent". Billboard's Roy Waddell similarly described it as a "chestnut" that didn't get its "proper due" until the live version was released on Songs in the Attic. Joel biographer Fred Schruers described it as the one "gem" from Cold Spring Harbor. According to Rolling Stone Album Guide critic Paul Evans, "She's Got a Way" "set the pattern for the ballads Joel would soon turn out effortlessly".

== Live version ==
The version released on Songs in the Attic was recorded at a live performance in June 1980 at the Paradise Rock Club in Boston, Massachusetts. Joel performs the song with his own piano accompaniment. Billboard called the live single a "delicate love ballad sincerely rendered". Record World said that "Joel delivers a one-man show worthy of several encores." Ken Bielen describes the performance as being influenced by Paul McCartney's style, and says that the small venue with its "attentive audience" provides an "intense intimacy". Schruers describes this version as being "a technically better performance much more in a chest register" but does not consider it as poignant as the original version. AllMusic critic Stephen Thomas Erlewine calls this version "richer and warmer" than the studio version. Joel also performed this song on live TV on Saturday Night Live on November 14, 1981.

== Chart performance ==
Chart (1981–82)	Peak position
Canada RPM Top Singles	46
Canada RPM Adult Contemporary	2
Israel (IBA)	25
US Billboard Hot 100	23
US Adult Contemporary (Billboard)	4

== Cover versions ==
Michael Sweet covered this song on 2007's Touched. Phil Keaggy covered the song on 2007's Acoustic Café, accompanied only by acoustic guitar. Ken Bielen described this version as being "sweet, gentle and simple". Don Henley sang "She's Got a Way" as a tribute to Joel when Joel was awarded a Kennedy Center Honor in 2013.

Margie Joseph recorded a femme version of the song, titled "He's Got a Way", in 1974. Her version uses electric piano as the primary instrument, and adds a Hammond B-3 organ in the third verse to add a touch of gospel music influence. She also adds a gospel choir for background vocals which, in Bielen's opinion gives the impression that her interpretation may be directed towards God rather than a human lover. Bernadette Peters covered "He's Got a Way" on her 1996 album I'll Be Your Baby Tonight, accompanied only on piano. Bielen described this version as being "technically perfect albeit emotion-filled". Erlewine says that she is "well-suited" to its "pseudo-show tune stylings".
