= Cold Spring Harbor (album) =

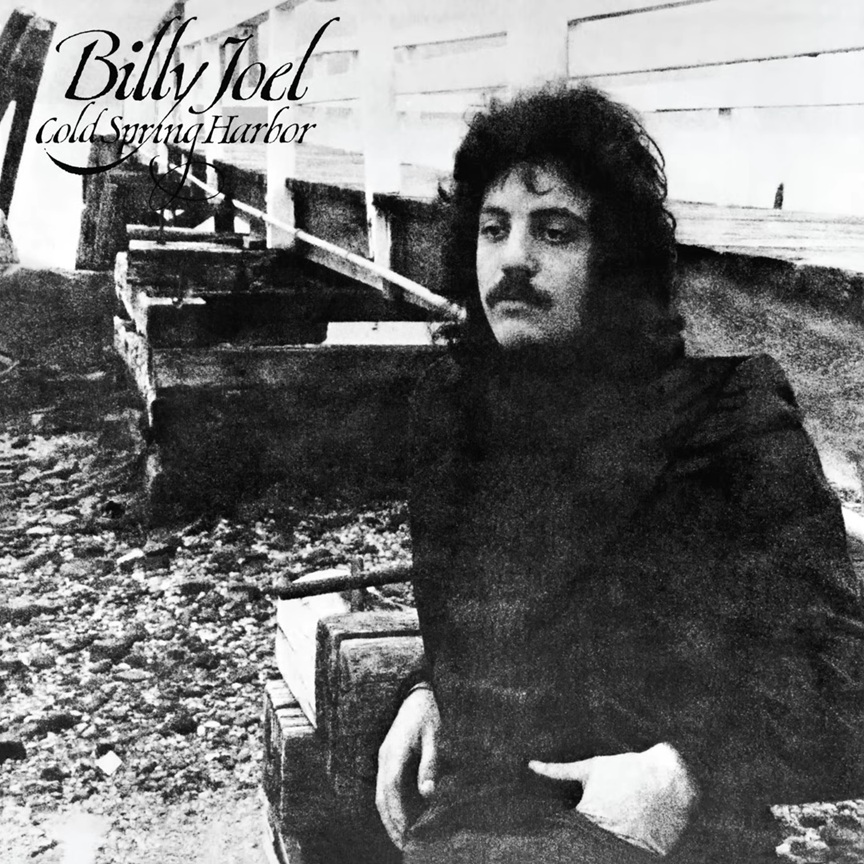
- Original 1971 cover. The cover of the 1983 reissue is zoomed in.

Studio album by Billy Joel
- Released: November 1, 1971
- Recorded: July 1971
- Studios: Record Plant (Los Angeles, California); Ultrasonic Recording (Hempstead, New York)
- Genres: Pop rock; soft rock
- Length: 32:54 (original); 30:26 (reissue)
- Label: Family Productions
- Producer: Artie Ripp

Billy Joel chronology
| Cold Spring Harbor (1971) | Piano Man (1973) |

Singles from Cold Spring Harbor
- 1. "She's Got a Way" Released: November 1971

Professional ratings
Review scores
| Source | Rating |
|---|---|
| AllMusic | 3/5 stars |
| Tom Hull – on the Web | B |

Cold Spring Harbor is the debut studio album by American recording artist Billy Joel, released on November 1, 1971, by Family Productions. The album sold poorly, receiving attention mainly after 1973's Piano Man and later albums became popular. Due to a mastering error, the original LP release ran at a faster speed than originally recorded. In 1983, producer Artie Ripp oversaw a remixed, edited and speed-corrected version of the album. This revised edition was issued by Columbia Records.

== Composition and recording ==
Cold Spring Harbor was named after the hamlet in the town of Huntington, New York, located on Long Island Sound near Joel's hometown. The front cover was photographed at Harbor Road.

The song "Tomorrow Is Today" drew from his period of depression and hospitalization the year before. When it was released as a single, Record World remarked that Joel had "a flair for dramatic, lush orchestral sounds."

Joel later released live versions of "She's Got a Way" and "Everybody Loves You Now" on his 1981 live album, Songs in the Attic. "She's Got a Way" was also released as a single in early 1982, peaking at No. 23 on the Billboard Hot 100 chart.

== Production ==
=== Mastering ===
Through an error in the album's mastering, the songs played slightly too fast, causing Joel's voice to sound unnaturally high, which he later compared to the Bee Gees and Alvin and the Chipmunks. In 1996, Joel recalled that, upon the album's release, he had organized a listening party with his friends and after hearing the album "I was, like, furious. I took the thing and I threw it like a frisbee."

Artie Ripp, owner of Family Productions and hence the owner of the original master tapes, was responsible for the production error, and the mistake cost him his friendship with Joel. He had originally signed the 22-year-old Joel to a ten-record contract that stripped Joel of all rights to the original tapes and to the publishing rights to all current and future songs.

As part of a deal with Columbia Records to release Joel from his contract, Ripp was still able to collect royalties on sales of Joel's records long after Joel's acrimonious departure from Family Productions (up until 1986's The Bridge). Ripp only sold the publishing rights to Joel's song catalog back to Joel reluctantly after intense pressure from CBS/Columbia Records president Walter Yetnikoff, who later stated that he had to threaten Ripp to finalize the deal.

=== Remix ===
In July–September 1983, Ripp and Larry Elliot remixed Cold Spring Harbor at Ripp's Fidelity Studios in Studio City, California. The album's speed was adjusted to correct Joel's vocal tone, and to enhance the album's sound, Ripp brought in studio musicians Mike McGee (drums), Al Campbell (synthesizers), and L.D. Dixon (Fender Rhodes) to overdub new rhythm sections on "Everybody Loves You Now" and "Turn Around". In addition, "You Can Make Me Free" was truncated by nearly three minutes (removing most of the original tail-end, fadeout jam), and the bass, drums, and orchestration on "Tomorrow Is Today" were removed.

The remix was released through Columbia Records, without any involvement from Joel. In a 2012 interview with actor Alec Baldwin, Joel stated that, despite the remix, he believes that "there's something wrong with it. It just doesn't sound right."

== Track listing ==
All tracks are written by Billy Joel.

Side one
| No. | Title | Length (Original LP) | Length |
|---|---|---|---|
| 1. | "She's Got a Way" | 2:47 | 2:50 |
| 2. | "You Can Make Me Free" | 5:49 | 2:59 |
| 3. | "Everybody Loves You Now" | 2:46 | 2:49 |
| 4. | "Why Judy Why" | 2:52 | 2:58 |
| 5. | "Falling of the Rain" | 2:35 | 2:38 |

Side two
| No. | Title | Length (Original LP) | Length |
|---|---|---|---|
| 1. | "Turn Around" | 3:26 | 3:06 |
| 2. | "You Look So Good to Me" | 2:25 | 2:29 |
| 3. | "Tomorrow Is Today" | 4:50 | 4:40 |
| 4. | "Nocturne (instrumental)" | 2:39 | 2:46 |
| 5. | "Got to Begin Again" | 2:54 | 2:52 |

== Personnel ==
Credits adapted from 1971 LP liner notes, except where otherwise noted.

Musicians

- Billy Joel – piano, organ, harpsichord, harmonica, vocals
- Rhys Clark – drums
- Denny Seiwell – drums
- Don Evans – guitar
- Sal DiTroia – guitar
- Joe Osborn – bass guitar
- Larry Knechtel – bass guitar
- Sneaky Pete – steel guitar
- Mike McGee – drums ("Everybody Loves You Now", "Turn Around") (1983)
- Al Campbell – keyboards ("Turn Around") (1983)
- L. D. Dixon – Fender Rhodes piano ("Turn Around") (1983)

Technical

- Artie Ripp – producer, director (1971); arranger, conductor, engineer, mixing, editing (1983)
- Irwin Mazur – executive producer, art direction
- Jimmie Haskell – arranger, conductor
- Bob Hughes – engineer, mixing
- Michael Stone – second engineer
- Larry Elliott – engineer, mixing, editing (1983)
- John Bradley – engineer
- Gordon Watanabe – assistant engineer (1983)
- Doug Sax – mastering (1983)

== Charts ==
| Chart (1984) | Peak position |
|---|---|
| Japanese Albums (Oricon) | 44 |
| UK Albums (Official Charts) | 95 |
| US Billboard 200^{[A]} | 158 |

== Notes ==
- A Cold Spring Harbor peaked at number 202 on the Billboard Bubbling Under the Top LP's chart in 1972. The album was then re-issued by Columbia in December 1983. All chart positions listed for Cold Spring Harbor are for its reissue.
