= Piano Man =

1973 single by Billy Joel

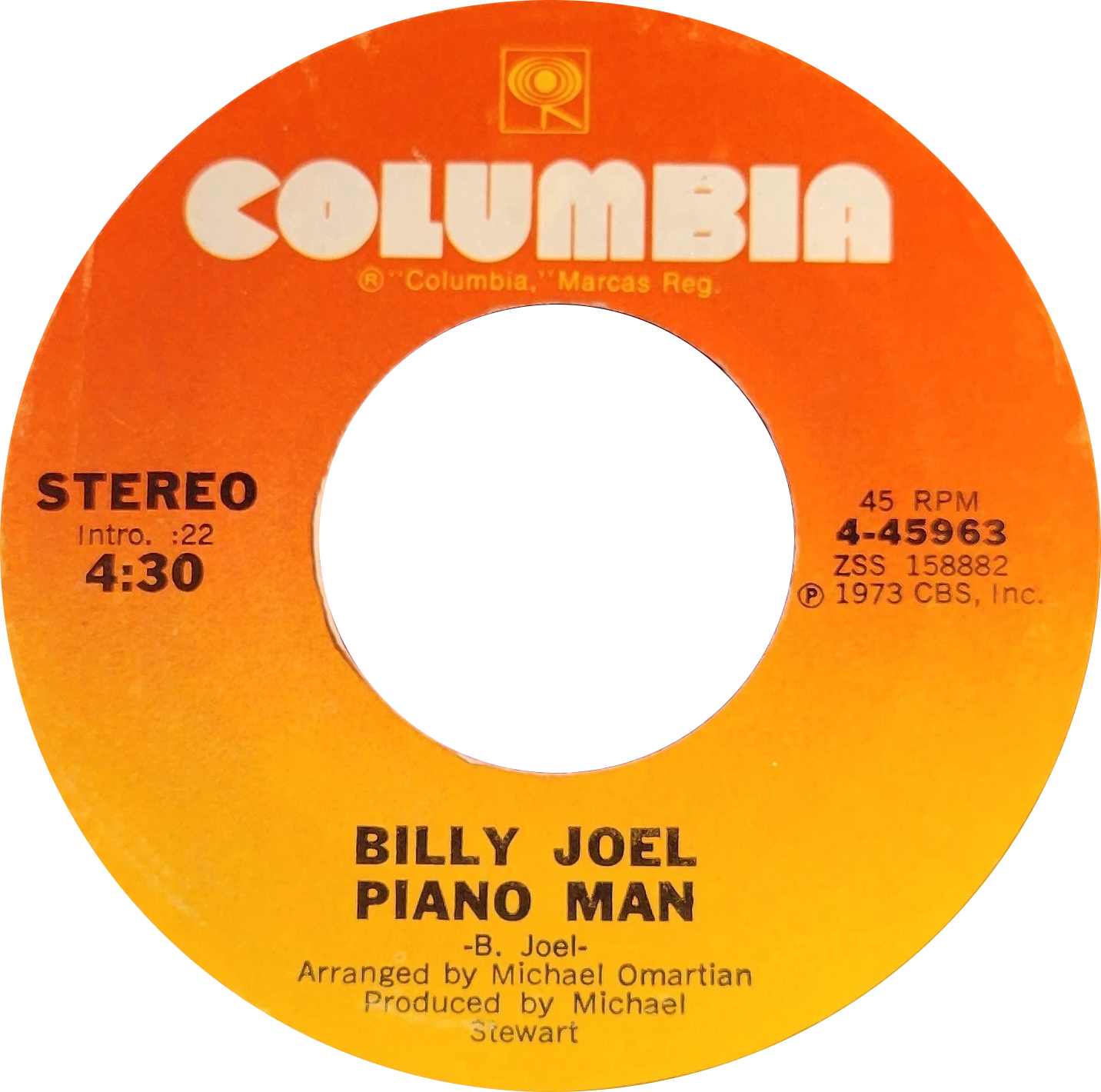
- Side A of the US single

Single by Billy Joel

from the album Piano Man
- B-side: "You're My Home"
- Released: 1973
- Recorded: September 1973
- Genre: Soft rock; folk rock; folk-pop
- Length: 5:40 (album version); 4:30 (single version); 3:05 (SP radio edit version)
- Label: Columbia
- Songwriter: Billy Joel
- Producer: Michael Stewart

Billy Joel singles chronology
"She's Got a Way" (1971)	"Piano Man" (1973)	"Worse Comes to Worst" (1974)

Music video
- "Piano Man" on YouTube

"Piano Man" is a song written and performed by American singer-songwriter Billy Joel. First released as a single in the US in 1974, it was included on Joel's 1973 album Piano Man. The song is sung from the point of view of a piano player at a bar, describing the patrons. "Piano Man" is based on Joel's real-life experiences as a lounge musician in Los Angeles from 1972 to 1973, which he had decided to pursue in an effort to escape his contracted New York City–based record company at the time, Family Productions, following the poor commercial performance of his debut album, Cold Spring Harbor (1971).

Joel's first major hit and his signature song, "Piano Man" peaked at number 25 on the Billboard Hot 100 chart in April 1974. Following Joel's breakthrough as a popular musician with the release of The Stranger, it became one of his most well-known songs.

In 2013, the song was inducted into the Grammy Hall of Fame. In 2015, the Library of Congress selected "Piano Man" for preservation in the National Recording Registry for its "cultural, historic, or artistic significance".

== Overview ==
=== Song background ===
"Piano Man" is a fictionalized retelling of Joel's own experience as a piano-lounge singer for six months in 1972–73 at the now defunct Executive Room bar in the Wilshire district of Los Angeles, which was either on Wilshire and Gramercy, or in the lobby of a large office building on Wilshire and Western. In a talk on Inside the Actors Studio, Joel said that he had to get away from New York due to a conflict with his then recording company and hence lived in Los Angeles for three years with his first wife. Since he needed work to pay the bills, but could not use his common name, he worked at the Executive Room bar as a piano player using the name "Bill Martin" (Joel's full name is William Martin Joel).

Joel has stated that all of the characters depicted in the song were based on real people. Joel had moved from New York to Los Angeles to record his first album, Cold Spring Harbor, which was marred by a mastering error by the album's producers at Family Productions, the label that first signed Joel. After this experience, Joel wanted to leave his contract with Family Productions for Columbia Records, but the contract made this very difficult, so Joel stated that he was "hiding out" at the bar while lawyers at Columbia tried to get him out of the deal.

=== Content ===
The verses of the song are sung from the point of view of a bar piano player who focuses mainly on the "regular crowd" that "shuffles" into the bar at nine o'clock on a Saturday: an old man, John the bartender, the waitress, businessmen, and bar regulars like "real estate novelist" Paul and naval serviceman Davy. Most of these characters have broken or unfulfilled dreams, and the pianist's is shown to help them "forget about life for a while". The pianist makes money when the patrons "sit at the bar, and put bread in my jar". The chorus, in bar-room sing-along style, comes from the bar patrons themselves, who say, "Sing us a song / You're the piano man / Sing us a song tonight / Well, we're all in the mood for a melody / And you've got us feeling all right." As for the lyrics, Joel has observed that with their five-line grouping, they were more in the form of a limerick than a typical poem.

== Reception ==
Cash Box said that the "soft, tender narrative tune, reminiscent of that material being spun by Harry Chapin, is going to attract a ton of folks looking to sink their teeth into an equal blend of music and lyric". Record World described it as "a lengthy (4:30) story song that is reminiscent of Harry Chapin's 'Taxi' in style and sound".

=== Releases ===
The song was released as a single on November 2nd, 1973 and was the second track on Joel's Piano Man album. It was later released on several greatest hits collections.

== Composition ==
"Piano Man"
A sample of Billy Joel's "Piano Man" from Piano Man

The sheet music for the song is in the key of C major, though Joel currently performs it in the key of B♭ major because of his age and deepened voice. It has a 6/8 fast waltz time signature and begins with a jazzy piano solo before moving into its piano and harmonica introduction. The verses and the chorus feature a descending walking bassline in C that ends with a D–G turnaround. Instrumentally, Joel's 1973 version features piano, harmonica, bass guitar, acoustic guitar, accordion, mandolin, and drums.

== Track listing ==
=== 7-inch US single (1974) ===
1. "Piano Man" – 4:30
2. "You're My Home" – 3:08

== Personnel ==
Credits adapted from Allmusic

- Billy Joel – piano, harmonica, vocals
- Wilton Felder – bass
- Larry Carlton – guitar
- Richard Bennett – guitar
- Dean Parks – guitar
- Michael Omartian – accordion
- Ron Tutt – drums

== Popularity ==
The single broke into the Billboard Top 40 in April 1974 at number 30, going on to ultimately peak at number 25, making it Joel's first top 40 hit. In Canada, the song peaked at number 10.

Initially, "Piano Man" was a moderate hit in the US. However, following the 1977 release of Joel's album The Stranger, the song became one of his best-known and best-loved songs.

During the first Face to Face tour featuring Elton John and Joel, ads promoted the event as "Rocket Man meets Piano Man".

"Piano Man" was ranked number 421 in the 2004 list of Rolling Stone's 500 Greatest Songs of All Time. Ultimate Classic Rock placed it at number 63 in its "Top 100 Classic Rock Songs" list.

"Piano Man" was selected as one of 25 sound recordings in 2015 to be preserved by the Library of Congress National Recording Registry for being "culturally, historically, or aesthetically significant".

In addition to selling more than five million copies in America alone, "Piano Man" is Joel's second most streamed track on Spotify after "Uptown Girl" with over 1 billion total streams. It also has been viewed over 300 million times on YouTube.

Americans tuning in to a Sunday, April 14, 2024, CBS broadcast of Joel's 100th concert in his Madison Square Garden residency became enraged when local affiliates abruptly cut away in the middle of the song to air their late newscasts. CBS blamed the issue on a "timing error" (the special had been delayed 30 minutes due to Masters Tournament coverage running long) and announced it would rebroadcast the entire program later in the week. A rebroadcast of the entire show aired on April 19, and the error had been fixed.

For his 2003 album Poodle Hat, Weird Al Yankovic parodied "Piano Man" with "Ode To a Superhero", which humorously summarized the 2002 film Spider-Man.

== Charts ==
=== Weekly charts ===
Chart (1973–1974)	Peak position
Australia (Kent Music Report)	20
Canadian RPM Top Singles	10
Canadian RPM Adult Contemporary	14
Euro Digital Songs (Billboard)	7
Ireland (IRMA)	83
New Zealand (Listener)	14
Netherlands (Single Top 100)	56
US Billboard Hot 100	25
US Adult Contemporary (Billboard)	4
US Cash Box Top 100	16

Chart (2025–2026)	Peak position
Ireland (IRMA)	70
Netherlands (Single Top 100)	32
Norway (IFPI Norge)	70
Sweden (Sverigetopplistan)	55

=== Year-end charts ===
Chart (1974)	Position
Canada	91
US (Joel Whitburn's Pop Annual)	178
Chart (1976)	Position
Australia (Kent Music Report)	93
All-time Top-2000 (editions 1999-now)	Position
Netherlands NPO Radio 2	in top-5 since 2016 in 2025: nr 2

== Certifications ==
Region	Certification	Certified units/sales
Denmark (IFPI Danmark)	Platinum	90,000^{‡}
Germany (BVMI)	Gold	250,000^{‡}
Italy (FIMI) Sales + streams since 2009	Gold	100,000^{‡}
Mexico (AMPROFON)	Gold	30,000^{*}
New Zealand (RMNZ)	7× Platinum	210,000^{‡}
Spain (Promusicae)	Platinum	60,000^{‡}
United Kingdom (BPI)	3× Platinum	1,800,000^{‡}
United States (RIAA)	8× Platinum	8,000,000^{‡}
^{*} Sales figures based on certification alone.^{‡} Sales+streaming figures based on certification alone.

== See also ==
- List of best-selling singles
