= Michael Stewart (musician) =

American musician

Michael Gassen Stewart (April 19, 1945 – November 13, 2002) was an American musician, songwriter, and producer. Originally founding the San Francisco-based folk rock band We Five, he later went on to produce Billy Joel's breakthrough album Piano Man as well as artists such as Tom Jones and Kenny Rankin earning him two Grammy nominations.

== Life and career ==
Stewart was the brother of John Stewart (1939–2008), a one-time member of The Kingston Trio and later a successful singer-songwriter, and the father of Jamie Stewart, frontperson of the avant-garde group Xiu Xiu.

We Five, known for their relatively complex harmonies, released "You Were on My Mind", which reached No. 1 in Cashbox and No. 3 on the Billboard Hot 100, and We Five received a best new group Grammy nomination. The next year, they had a Top 40 hit with "Let's Get Together."

He left the music industry in the early 1990s and became a computer programmer. He designed systems for Digidesigns and for Adobe for use by musicians and arrangers. His technological creations include the Session8 Digital Audio Workstation for PC, the Impulse Drum Trigger, the Feel Factory, co-designed with George Daly, and the Human Clock, which instructs computerized musical devices to follow a human tempo.

He later played bass in his child's band The Indestructible Beat of Palo Alto (IBOPA).

== Death ==
The 57-year-old Stewart died on November 13, 2002, reportedly a result of "a long illness." However, Jamie Stewart has acknowledged that Michael’s death was a suicide.

The track "Mike" from Xiu Xiu's album Fabulous Muscles concerns Jamie's reaction to Michael’s death.

Wounds to Bind: A Memoir of the Folk-Rock Revolution, a reminiscence by We Five co-founder Jerry Burgan incorporating Burgan's childhood friendship with Stewart, pondered Stewart's life, death and creative drive.
