= The Nylon Curtain Tour =

1982 concert tour by Billy Joel

- Continental tour by Billy Joel
- Tour program
- Location: North America
- Associated album: The Nylon Curtain
- Start date: October 24, 1982
- End date: December 31, 1982
- Legs: 1
- No. of shows: 35

Billy Joel concert chronology
- Glass Houses Tour (1980–81); The Nylon Curtain Tour (1982); An Innocent Man Tour (1984)

The Nylon Curtain Tour was a 1982 concert tour of the United States and Canada by singer-songwriter Billy Joel, to support the release of his eighth studio album, The Nylon Curtain. It followed a motorcycle accident earlier that year in which Joel's hands had been injured, and also the divorce from his first wife and manager, Elizabeth Weber.

== Background ==
Production of The Nylon Curtain had begun in the fall of 1981, but was delayed for several months after Joel was involved in a serious motorcycle accident. On April 15, 1982, he hit and was flipped over a car which had run a red light at an intersection on Long Island, crushing the bone in his left thumb and dislocating the other wrist. The album was released towards the end of September, when tentative plans were being made for a corresponding tour. These were confirmed by news agency UPI the following month.

The tour began in Salt Lake City on October 24, 1982, and ended just over two months later with a New Year's Eve concert at Madison Square Garden in New York. Dates were added as the tour progressed, since Joel had still not recovered fully from his injuries and wasn't sure how playing long sets would affect him. The concert in Bethlehem, Pennsylvania on December 27, for example, was not confirmed until less than a month beforehand.

This was the first tour following the departure of Richie Cannata on saxophone and keyboards. He was replaced with Mark Rivera (who still performs with Joel, as of 2024) and David LeBolt (who was dismissed after the Bridge Tour in 1987).

Joel's first video special, Live from Long Island, was recorded on December 29 at the penultimate stop of the tour, the Nassau Veterans Memorial Coliseum in Uniondale, New York. This was first broadcast on HBO on July 24, 1983, before being released on VHS. At the following year's Grammy Awards, it was nominated for the Best Video Album.

After the tour, it was reported that Joel said he was "leaving the radarscope" to get some rest, and had told his aides not to disturb him under any circumstances.

== Tour dates ==
Date	City	Country	Venue
North America Leg
October 24, 1982	Salt Lake City	United States	Salt Palace
October 26, 1982	Tempe	United States	ASU Activity Center
October 28, 1982	Denver	United States	McNichols Sports Arena
October 30, 1982	Kansas City	United States	Kemper Arena
November 1, 1982	Saint Paul	United States	St. Paul Civic Center
November 3, 1982	St. Louis	United States	Checkerdome
November 4, 1982	Rosemont	United States	Rosemont Horizon
November 6, 1982	Cincinnati	United States	Riverfront Coliseum
November 7, 1982	Richfield	United States	Richfield Coliseum
November 9, 1982	Toronto	Canada	Maple Leaf Gardens
November 10, 1982	Detroit	United States	Joe Louis Arena
November 11, 1982	Pittsburgh	United States	Civic Arena
November 13, 1982	Buffalo	United States	Buffalo Memorial Auditorium
November 15, 1982	Landover	United States	Capital Centre
November 17, 1982	Worcester	United States	The Centrum
November 19, 1982	Hartford	United States	Hartford Civic Center
November 20, 1982	Philadelphia	United States	The Spectrum
November 22, 1982	Greensboro	United States	Greensboro Coliseum
November 24, 1982	Atlanta	United States	Omni Coliseum
November 25, 1982	St. Petersburg	United States	Bayfront Center
November 27, 1982	Pembroke Pines	United States	Hollywood Sportatorium
November 28, 1982	Jacksonville	United States	Jacksonville Coliseum
November 30, 1982	Memphis	United States	Mid-South Coliseum
December 2, 1982	Austin	United States	Frank Erwin Center
December 3, 1982	Dallas	United States	Reunion Arena
December 5, 1982	Houston	United States	The Summit
December 9, 1982	Portland	United States	Portland Memorial Coliseum
December 12, 1982	Oakland	United States	Oakland–Alameda County Coliseum Arena
December 14, 1982	Inglewood	United States	The Forum
December 17, 1982	Vancouver	Canada	Pacific Coliseum
December 20, 1982	Edmonton	Canada	Northlands Coliseum
December 26, 1982	East Rutherford	United States	Brendan Byrne Arena
December 27, 1982	Bethlehem	United States	Stabler Arena
December 29, 1982	Uniondale	United States	Nassau Veterans Memorial Coliseum
December 31, 1982	New York City	United States	Madison Square Garden

== Setlist ==
This setlist is from the December 29 show at Nassau Coliseum. It does not represent all the dates throughout the tour.

1. "Chain Gang" (Opening Music)
2. "Allentown"
3. "My Life"
4. "Prelude/Angry Young Man"
5. "Piano Man"
6. "Don't Ask Me Why"
7. "The Stranger"
8. "Scandinavian Skies"
9. "Movin' Out (Anthony's Song)"
10. "She's Always a Woman"
11. "Pressure"
12. "Scenes from an Italian Restaurant"
13. "Just The Way You Are"
14. "Goodnight Saigon"
15. "Stiletto"
16. "Until the Night"
17. "It's Still Rock and Roll to Me"
18. "Sometimes a Fantasy"
19. "Big Shot"
20. "You May Be Right"
21. "Only the Good Die Young"
22. "Souvenir"

== Personnel ==
- Billy Joel – lead vocals, piano, keyboards, harmonica
- Mark Rivera – saxophone, flute, clarinet, vocals, percussion, keyboards, rhythm guitar
- Doug Stegmeyer – bass guitar, vocals
- David Brown – lead guitar, vocals
- Russell Javors – rhythm guitar, vocals
- David Lebolt – keyboards
- Liberty DeVitto – drums, percussion
