= Pig (2011 film) =

- Directed by: Henry Barrial
- Written by: Henry Barrial
- Produced by: Mark Stolaroff; Alex Cutler
- Starring: Rudolf Martin; Patrick Fabian; Sarah Danielle Madison
- Cinematography: Collin Brink
- Edited by: Eric Strand
- Music by: Alexander Burke; Nick Fevola
- Release date: April 16, 2011 (Nashville Film Festival)
- Running time: 90 min.
- Country: United States
- Language: English

Pig is a 2011 American science fiction film written and directed by Henry Barrial and starring Rudolf Martin.

== Plot ==
A man wakes up in the middle of a desert with no memories and he is nursed back to health by a woman. His search for his past takes him to Los Angeles and his only clue is a name written on a piece of paper.

== Cast ==
- Heather Ankeny as Isabel
- Kurt Boesen as Cabbie
- Ines Dali as Anouk
- Keith Diamond as Manny Elder
- Deborah Dir as Woman 3
- Clifford Elliot as Matriarch's Husband
- Patrick Fabian as Internist
- Jared Fisher as Down Syndrome Man
- Marijke Fisher as The Matriarch
- Billy Ray Gallion as Isabel's Husband
- Brian Lally as Motel Clerk
- Sarah Danielle Madison as Woman 2
- Rudolf Martin as Man
- Matt Miller as C.E.O.
- Jennifer Moller as Anouk's sister
- Karen S. Peterson as Karla Ernst
- Ringo Peterson as Max Ernst
- Glen Powell as Johnny the Teacher
- Todd Ray as Freak Show Man
- Pamela Salem as Narrator
- Steve Tom as Doctor
- Leyna Weber as Natalie

== Release ==
Pig debuted on 16 April 2011 at the Nashville Film Festival and opened in other film festivals on the dates given below.

Region	Release date	Festival
United States	April 16, 2011	Nashville Film Festival
United Kingdom	April 30, 2011	The London International Festival of Science Fiction and Fantastic Film
Netherlands	September 9, 2011	B-movie, Underground & Trash Film Festival
Germany	September 16, 2011	Filmfest Oldenburg
United States	September 24, 2011	Chesapeake Film Festival
United States	October 2, 2011	Shriekfest
United States	October 7, 2011	BendFilm Festival
United States	October 15, 2011	Spooky Movie International Horror Film Festival
United States	October 20, 2011	Orlando Film Festival
United States	October 22, 2011	Thriller! Chiller! Film Festival
United States	November 13, 2011	St. Louis International Film Festival
