= Leyna =

Leyna is a feminine given name. Notable people with the name include:

- Leyna Bloom (born 1990), American transgender model, dancer, actress, and activist
- Leyna Nguyen (born 1970), Vietnamese-American television anchor and reporter
- Leyna Weber (born April 18,1968), American actress

== See also ==
- "All for Leyna", 1980 song by Billy Joel
