= Glass Houses (album) =

Studio album by Billy Joel
- Released: March 12, 1980
- Studios: A & R, New York City
- Genres: New wave; rock; pop rock
- Length: 35:06
- Label: Columbia
- Producer: Phil Ramone

Billy Joel chronology
| 52nd Street (1978) | Glass Houses (1980) | Songs in the Attic (1981) |

Back cover (some versions)
- On the LP and some CD releases, Joel is shown looking through a hole after throwing a rock in the glass house. This is also seen on the front cover of some of the single releases from this album.

Singles from Glass Houses
- 1. "You May Be Right" Released: March 1980; 2. "All for Leyna" Released: March 1980 (Europe, AU); 3. "It's Still Rock and Roll to Me" Released: May 1980; 4. "Don't Ask Me Why" Released: July 1980; 5. "Sometimes a Fantasy" Released: September 1980

Glass Houses is the seventh studio album by American singer-songwriter Billy Joel, released on March 12, 1980, by Columbia Records. The record was a commercial success, topping the Billboard 200 chart for six consecutive weeks. It features Joel's first single to peak at No. 1 on Billboard's Hot 100 chart, "It's Still Rock and Roll to Me". It was ranked No. 4 on Billboard's 1980 year-end chart. The album is the 41st best-selling album of the 1980s, with sales of 7.1 million copies in the US alone. In 1981, Joel won a Grammy Award for Best Male Rock Vocal Performance for his work on Glass Houses. According to music critic Stephen Thomas Erlewine, the album featured "a harder-edged sound" compared to Joel's other work, in response to the punk and new wave movements. This was also the final studio album to feature the original incarnation (Joel, Richie Cannata, Doug Stegmeyer, Russell Javors and Liberty DeVitto) of the Billy Joel Band, augmented by new lead guitarist David Brown. Multi-instrumentalist Cannata left the band just before the sessions began for Joel's next studio album, 1982's The Nylon Curtain.

== Background ==
This album was the third collaboration between Joel and producer Phil Ramone, following The Stranger and 52nd Street and the final such collaboration in association with Home Run.

Opening with the sound of glass shattering, Glass Houses has more of a hard rock feel than Joel's previous albums. The cover shows Joel poised to throw a rock through the two-story window of his real-life waterfront glass house in Cove Neck. On some versions, the back cover shows Joel looking through the hole that the rock made in the glass.

== Critical reception ==
Professional ratings
Review scores
| Source | Rating |
|---|---|
| AllMusic | 4.5/5 stars |
| Blender | 3/5 stars |
| Christgau's Record Guide | B− |
| The Encyclopedia of Popular Music | 3/5 stars |
| The Great Rock Discography | 6/10 |
| Record Mirror | 4/5 stars |
| The Rolling Stone Album Guide | 3/5 stars |
| Smash Hits | 8/10 |

Rolling Stone critic Paul Nelson stated: "Billy Joel writes smooth and cunning melodies, and what many of his defenders say is true: his material's catchy. But then, so's the flu." In Christgau's Record Guide: The '80s (1990), Robert Christgau said: "From the straight-up hubba-hubba of 'You May Be Right' to the Rick Wakeman ostinatos of 'Sometimes a Fantasy' to the McCartneyesque melodicism of 'Don't Ask Me Why' to the what-it-is of 'It's Still Rock and Roll to Me,' it's all rock and roll to him, but to me it's closer to what pop meant before ironists and aesthetes, including yours truly, appropriated the term. Closer than any skinny-tie bands, that's for sure: gregarious, shameless, and above all profitable. Of course, if it doesn't make up in reach what it lacks in edge, ironists and aesthetes needn't notice it's there. And beyond 'Sleeping With the Television On,' I couldn't tell you thing one about side two, which I just played three times."

In 2004, the pop-culture journalist and rock critic Chuck Klosterman praised the album in an essay on Joel titled "Every Dog Must Have His Every Day, Every Drunk Must Have His Drink" from his book Sex, Drugs, and Cocoa Puffs (the title of the essay refers to a line from the Glass Houses song "Don't Ask Me Why"). Klosterman praised some of the more obscure tracks from the album including "All for Leyna", "I Don't Want to Be Alone", "Sleeping with the Television On" and "Close to the Borderline".

In a retrospective review, Stephen Thomas Erlewine of AllMusic wrote: "It may not be punk – then again, it may be his concept of punk – but Glass Houses is the closest Joel ever got to a pure rock album."

== Track listing ==
All songs written by Billy Joel.

Side one
| No. | Title | Length |
|---|---|---|
| 1. | "You May Be Right" | 4:15 |
| 2. | "Sometimes a Fantasy" | 3:40 |
| 3. | "Don't Ask Me Why" | 2:59 |
| 4. | "It's Still Rock and Roll to Me" | 2:57 |
| 5. | "All for Leyna" | 4:15 |
| Total length: | | 18:06 |

Side two
| No. | Title | Length |
|---|---|---|
| 6. | "I Don't Want to Be Alone" | 3:57 |
| 7. | "Sleeping with the Television On" | 3:02 |
| 8. | "C'était Toi (You Were the One)" | 3:25 |
| 9. | "Close to the Borderline" | 3:47 |
| 10. | "Through the Long Night" | 2:43 |
| Total length: | | 16:54 |

== Personnel ==
=== Musicians ===
- Billy Joel – vocals, piano, Yamaha CP-70, synthesizers, accordion, harmonica
- Richie Cannata – saxophones, flute, organ
- David Brown – electric and acoustic guitars (lead)
- Russell Javors – electric and acoustic guitars (rhythm)
- Doug Stegmeyer – bass guitar
- Liberty DeVitto – drums, percussion

=== Technical ===
- Produced by Phil Ramone
- Engineered by Jim Boyer
- Assistant engineer – Bradshaw Leigh
- Mastered by Ted Jensen at Sterling Sound (New York, NY)
- Technician – Brian Ruggles
- Lighting – Steve Cohen
- Photography – Jim Houghton
- Production assistant – Michele Slagter
- Product management – Jeff Schock

== Accolades ==
=== Grammy Awards ===
| Year | Nominee / work | Award | Result |
|---|---|---|---|
| 1981 | Glass Houses | Best Rock Vocal Performance – Male | Won |
| 1981 | Glass Houses | Album of the Year | Nominated |

=== American Music Awards ===
| Year | Nominee / work | Award | Result |
|---|---|---|---|
| 1981 | Glass Houses | Favorite Pop/Rock Album | Won |
| 1981 | Billy Joel (performer) | Favorite Pop/Rock Male Artist | Nominated |

== Charts ==
=== Weekly charts ===
| Chart (1980) | Peak position |
|---|---|
| Australian (Kent Music Report) | 2 |
| Austrian Albums (Ö3 Austria) | 4 |
| Canadian Albums (RPM) | 1 |
| Dutch Albums (MegaCharts) | 20 |
| French Albums (SNEP) | 21 |
| Icelandic Albums (Tónlist) | 1 |
| Japanese Albums (Oricon) | 6 |
| New Zealand Albums (RIANZ) | 6 |
| Norwegian Albums (VG-lista) | 2 |
| Spanish Albums (AFE) | 27 |
| Swedish Albums (Sverigetopplistan) | 6 |
| Swiss Albums (Schweizer Hitparade) | 16 |
| UK Albums (OCC) | 9 |
| US Billboard 200 | 1 |
| West German Albums (Media Control) | 24 |
| Zimbabwean Albums (ZIMA) | 3 |

=== Year-end charts ===
| Chart (1980) | Position |
|---|---|
| Australian Albums Chart | 2 |
| Austrian Albums Chart | 17 |
| Canadian Albums Chart | 2 |
| French Albums Chart | 91 |
| Japanese Albums Chart | 21 |
| New Zealand Albums Chart | 20 |
| Norwegian Albums Chart (Vår Period) | 2 |
| UK Albums Chart | 63 |
| US Billboard 200 | 4 |
| Chart (1981) | Position |
| Canadian Albums Chart | 94 |
| US Billboard Year-End | 64 |

== Certifications and sales ==
| Region | Certification | Certified units/sales |
|---|---|---|
| Australia (ARIA) | Platinum | 50,000^{^} |
| Canada (Music Canada) | 5× Platinum | 740,000 |
| Hong Kong (IFPI Hong Kong) | Gold | 10,000^{*} |
| Japan | — | 317,000 |
| United Kingdom (BPI) | Gold | 100,000^{^} |
| United States (RIAA) | 7× Platinum | 7,000,000^{^} |
^{*} Sales figures based on certification alone.^{^} Shipments figures based on certification alone.
