= Sometimes a Fantasy =

Single by Billy Joel

from the album Glass Houses
- B-side: "All for Leyna"
- Released: October 11, 1980
- Recorded: 1979
- Genre: Hard rock; punk rock; new wave; synth-pop
- Length: 4:19 (single version); 3:40 (album version)
- Label: Columbia
- Songwriter: Billy Joel
- Producer: Phil Ramone

Billy Joel singles chronology
"Don't Ask Me Why" (1980)	"Sometimes a Fantasy" (1980)	"Say Goodbye to Hollywood" (1981)

Music video
- "Sometimes a Fantasy" on YouTube

"Sometimes a Fantasy" is a song written and recorded by American singer-songwriter Billy Joel, taken from his seventh studio album, Glass Houses (1980). Released by Columbia Records in October 1980, the single peaked at No. 36 on the US Billboard Hot 100. The song is a "melodic, fast paced rocker" that starts with the sound of Joel touch-tone dialing a telephone number, as shown on the single cover.

The lyrics are about a sexually-frustrated man who tries to convince his significant other to have phone sex. He explains that he is lonely since they are far away from each other and that he does "know it's awful hard to try to make love long distance".

== Music video ==
The video starts with Joel in bed, dialing a woman's number. She picks up the phone and the song starts playing. Throughout the video, Joel sings the song's lyrics to her down the phone. At the end, it turns out the entire call was just a fantasy, and no one had picked up.

== Other versions ==
The single version of "Sometimes a Fantasy" released in the United States and Canada has a running time of 4:19, making it longer than the album version, which runs at 3:40. The 45 RPM single also uses a different mix with guitars panned in different locations. The album's version ends with a fade out, while the single version does not, and instead includes Joel letting loose a Beatles' honoring yowl of "I got blisters on my blisters!", a reference to Ringo Starr's outburst, "I got blisters on my fingers" at the end of "Helter Skelter".

The extended version of the song was available as a US 7" vinyl, a Canadian 7" vinyl, a US promo 7" vinyl, a US DJ-promo 12" vinyl and (at 4:22) as the Japanese B-side of "All for Leyna" (available as a 7" and a 7" promo). The single was released in other countries as a 3:39 version, namely in Australia, the Netherlands and the UK (7" promo). The longer single version was not available on any of Joel's compilation albums or reissues until the 2022 digital-only release 50 Years of the Piano Man.

The official music video for this single uses an alternate vocal track, different from the album and single releases. A version of the song is included on Joel's 1987 live album, Kohuept.

== Reception ==
Billboard said that it "starts with a telephone ring and a rockabilly vocal before its transition into a melodic, fast-paced rocker." Record World called it a "pulsating rocker for AOR-pop."

== Personnel ==
- Billy Joel – vocals, Yamaha electric grand piano, synthesizers
- Richie Cannata – organ
- Dave Brown – electric guitar
- Russell Javors – electric guitar
- Doug Stegmeyer – bass
- Liberty DeVitto – drums, percussion

== Chart history ==
Chart (1980–1981)	Peak position
Canadian Singles Chart	21
UK Airplay (Record Business)	29
U.S. Billboard Hot 100	36
