= Billy Joel =

American singer, songwriter, and pianist (born 1949)

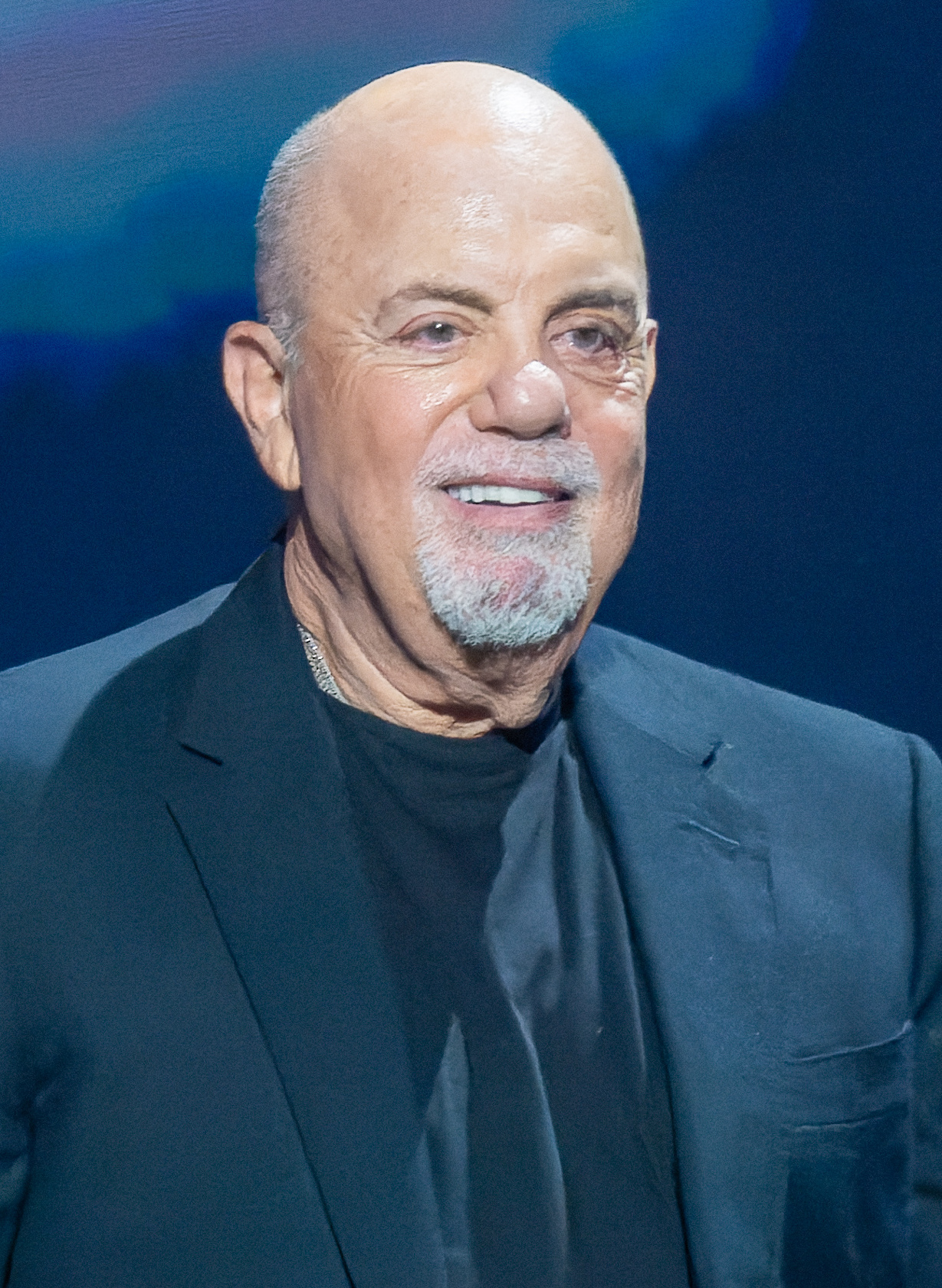
- Joel in 2023
- Born: William Martin Joel; May 9, 1949 (age 77); New York City, U.S.
- Occupations: Singer; songwriter; pianist
- Years active: 1964–present
- Spouses: Elizabeth Weber Small (m. 1973; div. 1982) Christie Brinkley (m. 1985; div. 1994) Katie Lee (m. 2004; div. 2009) Alexis Roderick (m. 2015)
- Children: 3, including Alexa Ray
- Relatives: Alexander Joel (half-brother); Karl Amson Joel (grandfather)
- Musical career
- Origin: Hicksville, New York, U.S.
- Genres: Rock; pop
- Instruments: Vocals; piano; harmonica
- Labels: Columbia; Family Productions; Sony Classical
- Member of: Billy Joel Band
- Formerly of: The Hassles; Attila
- Website: billyjoel.com

William Martin Joel (/dʒoʊl/ JOHL; born May 9, 1949) is an American singer, songwriter, and pianist. Nicknamed the Piano Man, after his 1973 signature song of the same name, he has had a successful career as a solo artist since the 1970s. From 1971 to 1993, Joel released 12 entirely self-written studio albums spanning the genres of pop and rock, and in 2001 released a one-off studio album of classical compositions. With over 160 million records sold worldwide, Joel is one of the world's best-selling music artists and is the fourth-best-selling solo artist in the United States. His 1985 compilation album, Greatest Hits – Volume I & Volume II, is one of the best-selling albums in the U.S.

Joel was born in the Bronx in New York City and grew up in the Levittown portion of Hicksville on Long Island, where he began taking piano lessons at his mother's insistence. After dropping out of high school to pursue a music career, Joel took part in his first band: The Echoes before joining two short-lived bands, the Hassles and Attila, and signing a record deal with Family Productions, embarking on a solo career with his debut album, Cold Spring Harbor (1971). In 1972, Joel caught the attention of Columbia Records after a live radio performance of "Captain Jack" became popular in Philadelphia, prompting him to sign a new record deal with the company, through which he released his second album, Piano Man (1973). After Streetlife Serenade (1974) and Turnstiles (1976), Joel achieved his critical and commercial breakthrough with The Stranger (1977). It became Columbia's best-selling release, selling over 10 million copies and spawning the hit singles "Just the Way You Are", "Movin' Out (Anthony's Song)", "Only the Good Die Young", and "She's Always a Woman", as well as the concert staples "Scenes from an Italian Restaurant" and "Vienna".

Joel's 52nd Street (1978) was his first album to reach No. 1 on the Billboard 200, as well as winning his first and only Album of the Year award at the 22nd Annual Grammy Awards. Glass Houses (1980) was an attempt to further establish him as a rock artist; it featured "It's Still Rock and Roll to Me" (Joel's first single to top the Billboard Hot 100), "You May Be Right", "Don't Ask Me Why", and "Sometimes a Fantasy". The Nylon Curtain (1982) stemmed from a desire to create more lyrically and melodically ambitious music. An Innocent Man (1983) served as an homage to genres of music that Joel had grown up with in the 1950s, such as rhythm and blues and doo-wop; it featured "Tell Her About It", "Uptown Girl", and "The Longest Time", three of his best-known songs. He also released studio albums The Bridge (1986) and Storm Front (1989). After River of Dreams (1993), Joel largely retired from producing studio material, although he went on to release Fantasies & Delusions (2001), featuring classical compositions composed by him and performed by British-Korean pianist Richard Hyung-ki Joo. Joel provided voiceover work in Disney Animation's 1988 film Oliver & Company, performing the song "Why Should I Worry?", and contributed to the soundtracks to several films, including Easy Money (1983), Ruthless People (1986), A League of Their Own, and Honeymoon in Vegas (both 1992). Joel returned to writing new songs with the 2024 single "Turn the Lights Back On".

Joel has had a successful touring career, holding live performances across the globe. In 1987, he became one of the first Western artists to hold a rock tour in the Soviet Union. Joel has had thirty-three Top 40 hits in the U.S., three of which ("It's Still Rock and Roll to Me", "Tell Her About It", and "We Didn't Start the Fire") topped the Billboard Hot 100. He has been nominated for twenty-three Grammy Awards, winning five, including Album of the Year for 52nd Street. Joel was inducted into the Songwriters Hall of Fame in 1992, the Rock and Roll Hall of Fame in 1999 and the Long Island Music Hall of Fame in 2006. He received the 2001 Johnny Mercer Award from the Songwriters Hall of Fame and was recognized at the 2013 Kennedy Center Honors.

== Early life, family and education ==
Joel was born on May 9, 1949, in the Bronx, New York City. At age one, he moved with his family to Hicksville in the town of Oyster Bay on Long Island. The family included Joel's adopted sister, Judy, who is his maternal cousin.

His mother, Rosalind Nyman, was born in Brooklyn to English parents, Philip and Rebecca, who were Jewish. Joel later said that his grandfather, Philip, was "the most inspiring presence in my life". Billy's father, Howard (born Helmut) Joel, an accomplished amateur classical pianist and businessman, was born in Nuremberg, Germany to a Jewish family, the only child of merchant and manufacturer Karl Amson Joel, and educated in Switzerland. In 1928, Karl Joel set up a prosperous mail-order textile company, Joel Macht Fabrik, which within 10 years had become the second largest of its type in Germany. Escaping the Nazi regime, Karl, his wife and young son emigrated to Switzerland. Following the passing of laws which prevented Jews from owning property and businesses, in 1938 he was forced to sell his company to Josef Neckermann for a fraction of its true value. As direct entry to the United States was difficult for German Jews due to strict quotas imposed by the Immigration Act of 1924, the family reached the country via Cuba, where they arrived in early 1939 and stayed for nearly two years. In the United States, Howard became an engineer but always loved music.

Joel's parents met in 1942, whilst taking part in a production of Gilbert and Sullivan's comic opera The Pirates of Penzance at the City College of New York. He has said that neither of his parents talked much about World War II. It was not until later that Joel learned more about his father's family. After his parents divorced in 1957, Howard returned to Europe, as he had never liked the United States: he considered the people uneducated and materialistic. Howard settled in Vienna, Austria, and later remarried. Joel's father and step-mother had Joel's half-brother, Alexander Joel, in England; Alexander became a classical conductor in Europe and was the chief musical director of the Staatstheater Braunschweig from 2001 to 2014.

At age four, Joel began taking piano lessons reluctantly at his mother's insistence, after he started banging on the piano in the family home. He continued with formal tuition until about the age of 16, his teachers including the noted American pianist Morton Estrin and musician Timothy Ford. When learning a new piece, he would sometimes improvise in the style of its composer to avoid reading the music. Joel has said that he is a better organist than a pianist. As a teenager, Joel took up boxing and competed on the amateur Golden Gloves circuit as a welterweight. He abandoned the sport after his nose was broken, having won 22 of his 26 fights.

Although Joel's parents were Jewish, he did not grow up in the religion. Joel stated: "I was not brought up Jewish in any religious way. My circumcision was as Jewish as they got." He attended a Roman Catholic church with friends. At age 11, Joel was baptized in a Church of Christ in Hicksville. The Joel family soon left this church, however, after the pastor of the church made antisemitic comments. He now identifies as a Jewish atheist.

Joel attended Hicksville High School until 1967 but did not graduate with his class. He was playing at a piano bar to help support himself, his mother and sister, and missed a crucial English exam after playing a late-night gig the evening before. Although Joel was a comparatively strong student, at the end of his senior year, he did not have enough credits to graduate. Rather than attend summer school to earn his diploma, Joel decided to begin a music career: "I told them, 'To hell with it. If I'm not going to Columbia University, I'm going to Columbia Records, and you don't need a high school diploma over there'." In 1992, he submitted essays to the school board in lieu of the missed exam. They were accepted, and he was awarded his diploma at Hicksville High's annual graduation ceremony 25 years after leaving.

== Music career ==
=== 1964–1970: Early career ===
Although Joel's songs are infused with references to classical music, his music mostly encompasses pop and rock, fitting into the subgenres of pop rock and soft rock. Furthermore, Joel's tightly structured melodies and down-to-earth songwriting betray the influence of early rock & roll and rhythm & blues artists, including Elvis Presley and the Everly Brothers. After seeing the Beatles on The Ed Sullivan Show he decided to pursue a career in music. As he later commented:

That one performance changed my life ... Up to that moment I'd never considered playing rock as a career ... (W)hen I saw four guys who didn't look like they'd come out of the Hollywood star mill, who played their own songs and instruments, and especially because you could see this look in John Lennon's face—and he looked like he was always saying: '---- you!'—I said: 'I know these guys, I can relate to these guys, I am these guys. This is what I'm going to do—play in a rock band'.

At age 16, Joel joined the Echoes, a group which specialized in British Invasion songs. The Echoes began recording in 1965. Joel played piano on several records released through Kama Sutra Productions and on recordings produced by Shadow Morton. He played on a demo version of "Leader of the Pack", which in 1964 became a major hit for the Shangri-Las, and has said that he was also on the demo or master recording of their song "Remember (Walking in the Sand)". The released single included a co-producer credit for Artie Ripp, who later was the first to sign and produce Joel as a solo artist after Michael Lang, who had given Joel a monetary advance, passed Joel along to Ripp to focus his attentions elsewhere.

The Echoes changed their name briefly to the Emeralds, and then to the Lost Souls. Joel left the band in 1967 to join the Hassles, a Long Island group that had signed with United Artists Records. Over the next year and a half, they released four singles and two albums. However, all were commercial failures. Joel and drummer Jon Small, who would eventually direct his music videos starting in the late 1970s, left the Hassles in 1969 to form the duo Attila, releasing an eponymous debut album in July 1970. The duo disbanded the following October when Joel began an affair with Small's wife, Elizabeth. The pair later married.

=== 1970–1974: Cold Spring Harbor and Piano Man ===
Joel signed a contract with the record company Family Productions, with which he recorded his first solo album, Cold Spring Harbor, named for Cold Spring Harbor, a hamlet on his native Long Island. Artie Ripp, owner of Family Productions, states that he spent US$450,000 developing Joel; nevertheless, the album was mastered at too high a speed and was a technical and commercial disappointment.

The popular songs "She's Got a Way" and "Everybody Loves You Now" were first released on this album, but went largely unnoticed until live versions were included on Songs in the Attic (1981). Columbia released a remastered version of Cold Spring Harbor in 1983, with certain songs shortened or re-orchestrated.

Joel began his Cold Spring Harbor tour in the fall of 1971, touring with his band, consisting of Rhys Clark on drums, Al Hertzberg on guitar, and Larry Russell on bass guitar, throughout the mainland United States and Puerto Rico, opening for such artists as the J. Geils Band, the Beach Boys, Badfinger and Taj Mahal. Joel's performance at the Puerto Rican Mar y Sol Pop Festival was especially well-received; and although recorded, Joel refused to have it published on the Mar Y Sol compilation album Mar Y Sol: The First International Puerto Rico Pop Festival. Nevertheless, interest in his music grew.

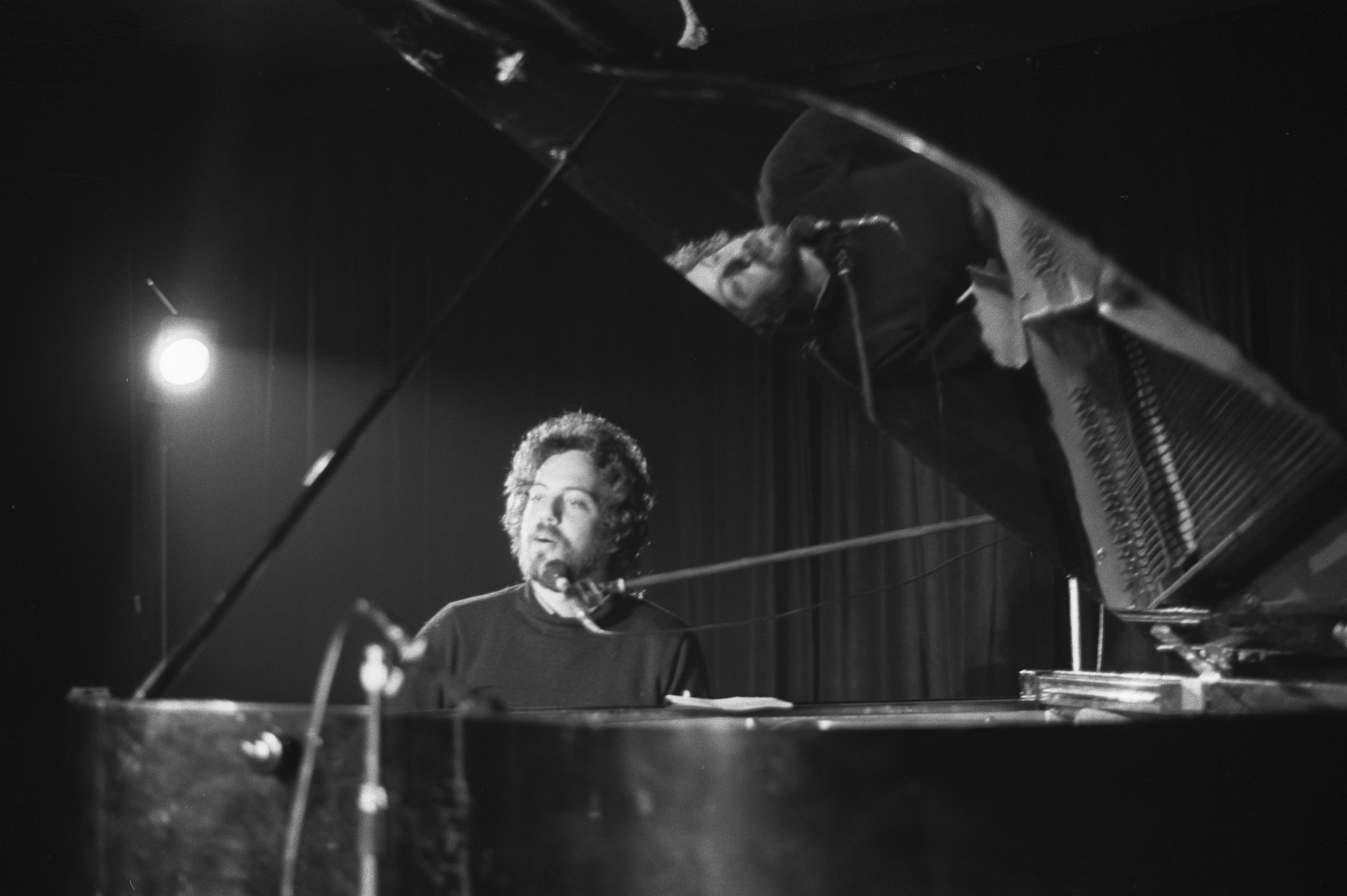
Joel performing in September 1972

On April 15, 1972, WMMR-FM radio in Philadelphia featured a live broadcast of Joel performing 12 songs, and a recording of the set was played several times by station DJ Jonathan Takiff on his late-night weekend show. As a result, "Captain Jack" became the most requested track in the station's history, and after receiving regular airplay, was soon an underground hit on the East Coast. Herb Gordon, a Columbia Records executive, heard Joel's music and brought him to the attention of company president Clive Davis. Joel signed a recording contract with the label in 1972 and moved to Los Angeles, where he lived for the next three years. For six months, Joel worked at The Executive Room piano bar on Wilshire Boulevard as "Bill Martin". While not playing his own material, it was during this period that he composed his signature song "Piano Man", about the bar's patrons. Though there was a bar called The Executive Room on Wilshire and Gramercy, numerous witnesses who saw Billy Joel perform in 1973 described the bar as being in the lobby of a large office building on the corner of Wilshire and Western, indicating that the bar likely had a secondary location during that period.

Although now signed to Columbia, Joel was still obliged to pay Artie Ripp and Michael Lang a share of his royalties from album sales. In 1981, when his contract was renegotiated, the company agreed to cover these payments itself. President of CBS/Columbia Records Walter Yetnikoff also bought the publishing rights to Joel's songs owned by Ripp, which he then gave to the artist as a birthday gift. Yetnikoff noted in the 2010 documentary The Last Play at Shea that he had to threaten Ripp to close the deal.

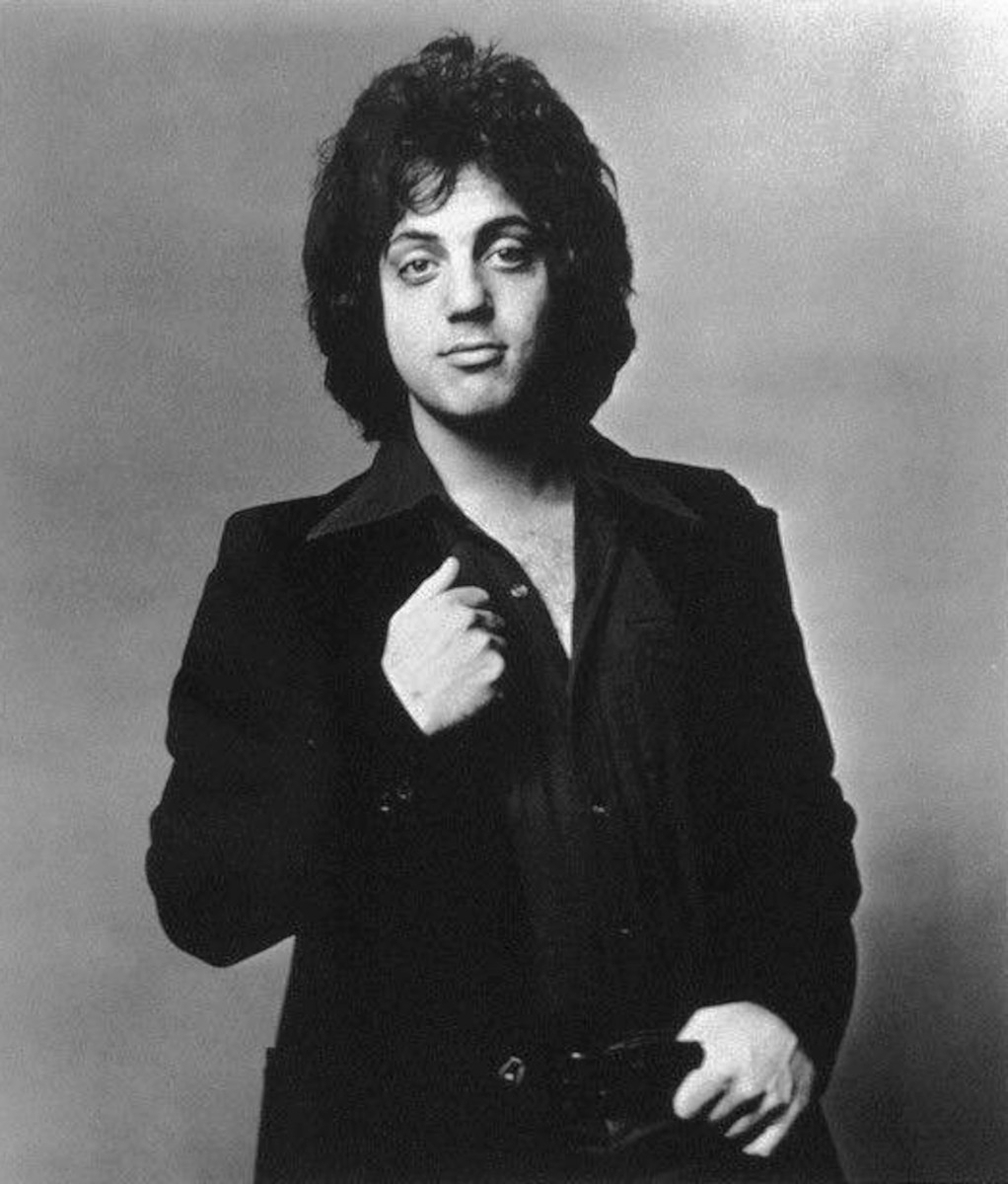
A 1973 promotional photo of Joel for Piano Man

Joel's first album with Columbia was Piano Man (1973). Despite modest sales, the album's title track became his signature song, ending nearly every concert. That same year, Joel's touring band changed. Guitarist Al Hertzberg was replaced by Don Evans, and bassist Larry Russell by Patrick McDonald, himself replaced in late 1974 by Doug Stegmeyer who stayed with Joel until 1989. Rhys Clark returned as drummer and Tom Whitehorse as banjoist and pedal steel player; Johnny Almond joined as saxophonist and keyboardist. The band toured the U.S. and Canada extensively, appearing on popular music shows. Joel's songwriting began attracting more attention; in 1974, Helen Reddy recorded the Piano Man track "You're My Home".

=== 1974–1977: Streetlife Serenade and Turnstiles ===
In 1974, Joel recorded his second Columbia album in Los Angeles, Streetlife Serenade. His manager at the time was Jon Troy, an old friend from New York's Bedford-Stuyvesant neighborhood; Troy was soon replaced by Joel's wife Elizabeth. Streetlife Serenade contains references to suburbia and the inner city. It is perhaps best known for "The Entertainer", a No. 34 hit in the U.S. Upset that "Piano Man" had been significantly cut for radio play, Joel wrote "The Entertainer" as a sarcastic response: "If you're gonna have a hit, you gotta make it fit, so they cut it down to 3:05." Although Streetlife Serenade was viewed unfavorably by critics, it contains the notable songs "Los Angelenos" and "Root Beer Rag", an instrumental that was a staple of his live set in the 1970s.

In late 1975, Joel played piano and organ on several tracks on Bo Diddley's The 20th Anniversary of Rock 'n' Roll all-star album.

Not long after the release of Streetlife Serenade, Joel began working on his next album, Turnstiles, at Caribou Ranch studio in Colorado. The difficult project began with Michael Stewart as producer, then James William Guercio took over before Stewart was brought in again. Using members of Elton John's backing band Dee Murray and Nigel Olsson, as well as session musicians, half the songs had been recorded when Joel decided the results were less than satisfactory. Also disenchanted with Los Angeles, where he encountered anti-New York sentiment, he returned to the East Coast metropolis in 1975, seeking inspiration in the city's troubles. Now with himself as producer, he rerecorded and completed the album, which when released in 1976, was the first to feature his regular touring band.

"Say Goodbye to Hollywood" was a minor hit, covered by Ronnie Spector and Nigel Olsson. During a 2008 radio interview, Joel said that he no longer performs the song because singing it in its high original key "shreds" his vocal cords; however, Joel did finally play it live for the first time since 1982 when he sang it at the Hollywood Bowl in May 2014. Although never released as a single, "New York State of Mind" became one of Joel's best-known songs; Barbra Streisand recorded a cover and Tony Bennett performed it as a duet with Joel on Playing with My Friends: Bennett Sings the Blues. Other notable songs from the album include "Summer, Highland Falls"; "Miami 2017 (Seen the Lights Go Out on Broadway)" and "Prelude/Angry Young Man", a concert mainstay.

=== 1977–1979: The Stranger and 52nd Street ===
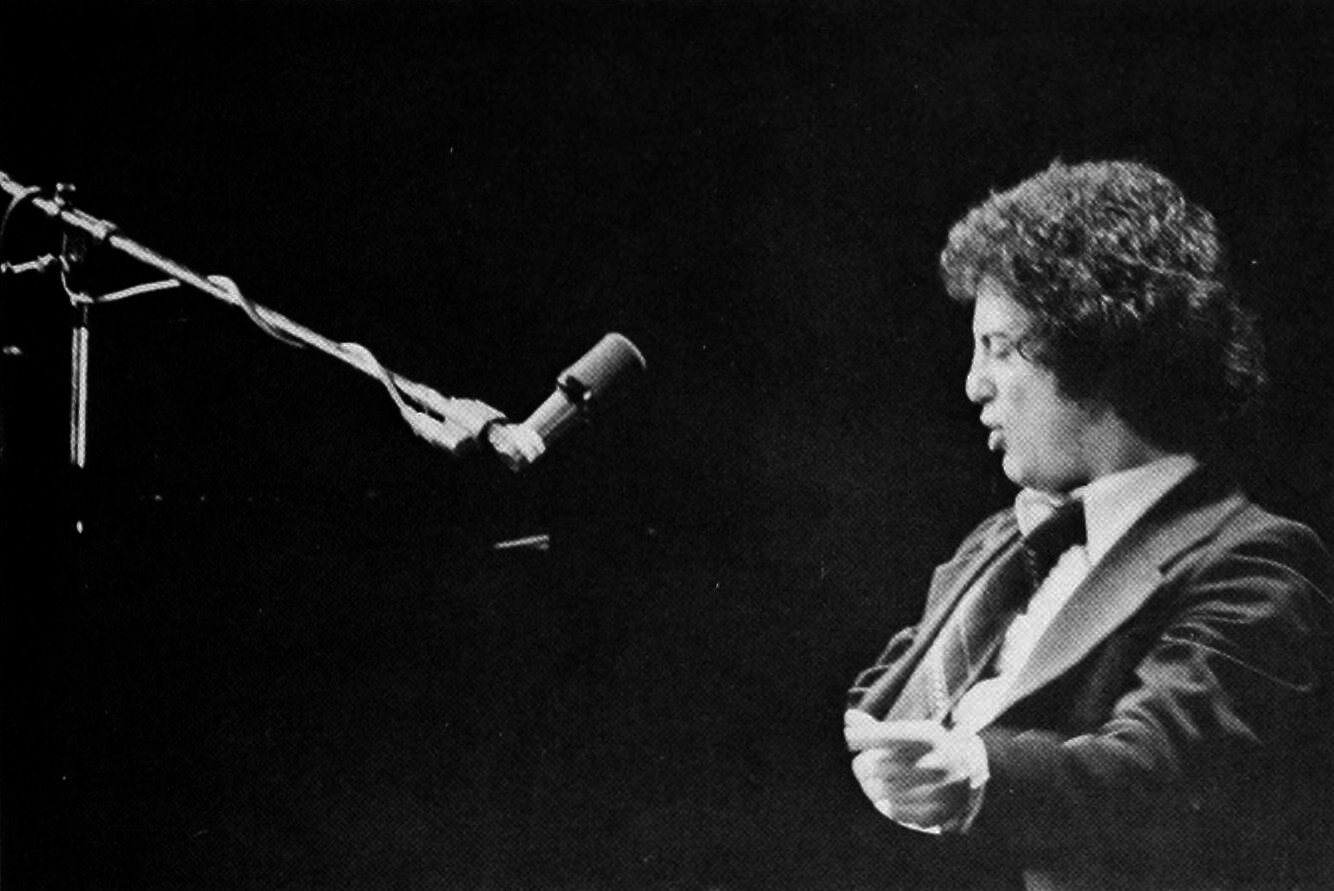
Joel performing in December 1977

During the Turnstiles tour, Joel's wife Elizabeth phoned George Martin in an attempt to recruit him as the producer for Joel's next album, but having seen the artist play live at Glassboro State College in New Jersey, Martin declined the invitation. Prior to the tour, Joel had expressed to his wife a desire to work with Phil Ramone at some point. She contacted the legendary producer, who attended Joel's concert at New York's Carnegie Hall on June 2, 1977 (as did Don DeVito from Columbia Records, who brought with him a recording truck to tape the show). Impressed by what he saw, Ramone went on to produce all seven studio albums Joel recorded from 1977 to 1986.

Their first collaboration, The Stranger (1977), was an enormous commercial success and "established Joel as a household name". The album yielded four Top-25 hits on the Billboard charts: "Just the Way You Are" (No. 3), "Movin' Out" (No. 17), "Only the Good Die Young" (No. 24) and "She's Always a Woman" (No. 17). Joel's first Top Ten album, The Stranger reached number 2 on the charts and was certified multi-Platinum, besting Simon & Garfunkel's Bridge over Troubled Water as Columbia's previous bestselling album. "Just the Way You Are" — written for Joel's first wife, Elizabeth Weber — was inspired by a dream and won Grammy awards for Record of the Year and Song of the Year. On tour in Paris, Joel learned the news late one night in a hotel room. It also featured "Scenes from an Italian Restaurant", an album-oriented rock classic, which has become one of his best-known songs. It is one of Joel's favorite of his own songs, which has become a firm staple of his live shows, and "Vienna", also one of Joel's personal favorites, and one of his most streamed songs on the internet as of 2022. Rolling Stone later ranked The Stranger the 70th greatest album of all time.

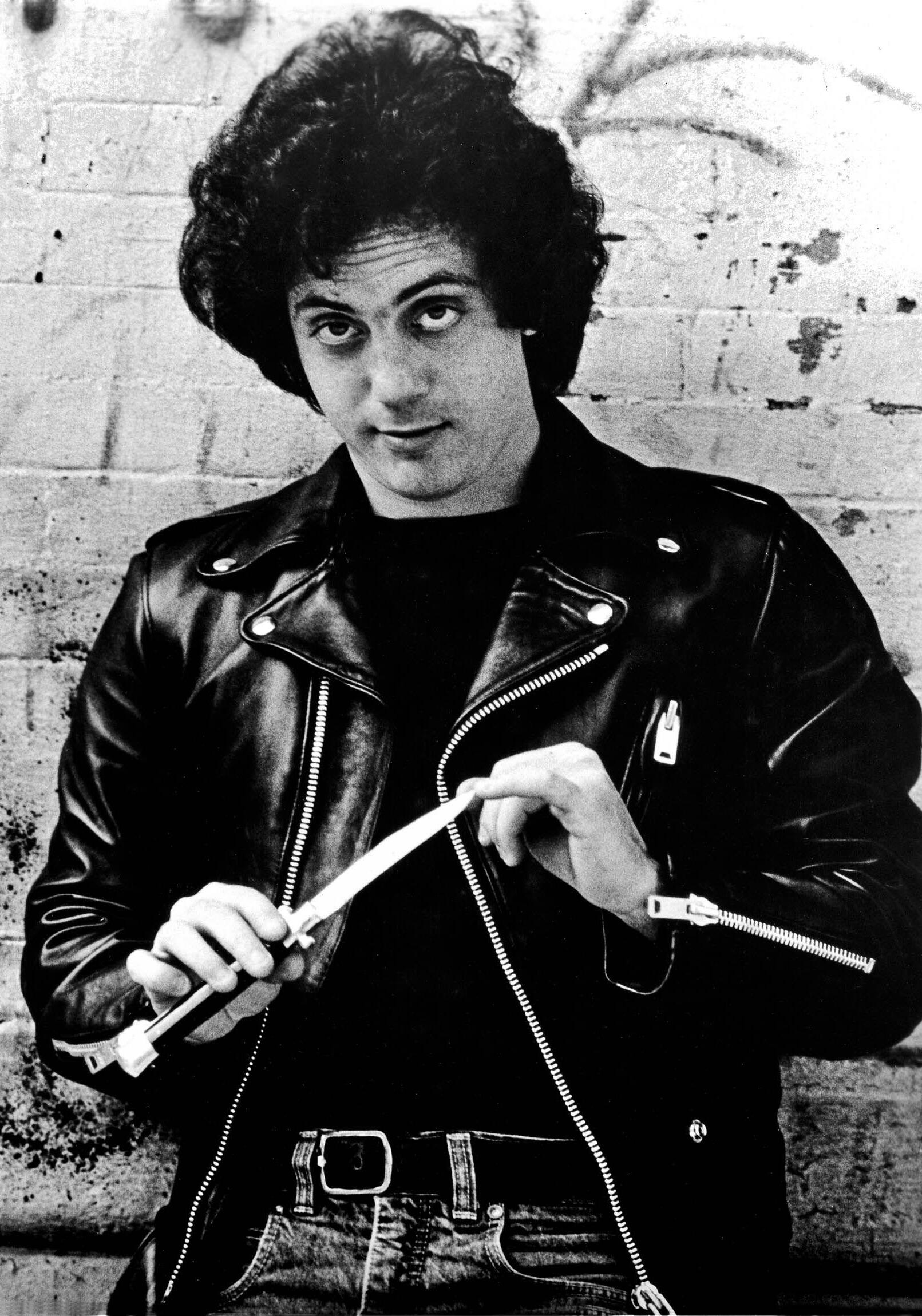
A 1978 promotional photo of Joel for 52nd Street

Joel released 52nd Street in 1978, naming it after Manhattan's 52nd Street, which, at the time of its release, served as the world headquarters of CBS/ Columbia. The album sold over seven million copies, propelled to number one on the charts by the hits "My Life" (No. 3), "Big Shot" (No. 14) and "Honesty" (No. 24). A cover of "My Life" by Gary Bennett became the theme for the television sitcom Bosom Buddies. 52nd Street also won Grammy awards for Best Pop Vocal Performance, Male and Album of the Year.

In 1978, Joel gave his first of what would go on to be at least 150 shows at New York City's Madison Square Garden. In 2025, Joel described playing at the arena as being a "dream come true". He currently dominates the record for most concerts performed at Madison Square Garden.

In 1979, Joel traveled to Havana, Cuba, to participate in the historic Havana Jam festival from March 2–4, alongside Rita Coolidge, Kris Kristofferson, Stephen Stills, the CBS Jazz All-Stars, the Trio of Doom, Fania All-Stars, Billy Swan, Bonnie Bramlett, Mike Finnegan, Weather Report, and an array of Cuban artists including Irakere, Pacho Alonso, Tata Güines and Orquesta Aragón. Although Joel's performance was for many the highlight of the weekend, CBS were unable to record or film it as planned because his wife objected to the fact that a specific deal had not been agreed with them in advance. He was interviewed about his experience of playing at the event for Ernesto Juan Castellanos's documentary Havana Jam '79.

52nd Street was the first commercially released album on the then-new compact disc format, in 1982.

=== 1979–1983: Glass Houses and The Nylon Curtain ===
The success of his piano-driven ballads like "Just the Way You Are", "She's Always a Woman" and "Honesty" led some critics to label Joel a "balladeer" and "soft rocker". He thought these labels were unfair and insulting, and with Glass Houses, Joel tried to record an album that proved that he could rock harder than his critics gave him credit for. Joel stated that the album cover, which pictured him wearing a leather jacket and about to throw a rock at a window of his Long Island home, was intended as a riposte to his image as a "mellow balladeer".

Glass Houses spent six weeks at the top of the Billboard album chart, yielding the hits "You May Be Right" (No. 7, May 1980), "It's Still Rock and Roll to Me", (No. 1, July 1980), "Don't Ask Me Why" (No. 19, September 1980) and "Sometimes a Fantasy" (No. 36, November 1980). The latter song gave its name to a 15-minute promotional film featuring both music and dialog, which as Joel's first venture of this kind, he wrote and directed himself. "It's Still Rock and Roll to Me" was his first number 1 on the Billboard Hot 100, where it spent eleven weeks in the Top 10 and became the ninth biggest-selling single of the year. His five sold-out shows at Madison Square Garden in 1980 earned him the venue's Gold Ticket Award for selling more than 100,000 tickets.

Glass Houses won the 1981 Grammy Award for Best Rock Vocal Performance, Male. It also won the American Music Award for Favorite Album, Pop/Rock category. In a recorded master class at the University of Pennsylvania, Joel recalled that he had written to the Beatles asking them how to get started in the music industry. In response, he received a pamphlet about Beatles merchandise. This later led to the idea of Joel conducting Q&A sessions around the world answering questions that people had about the music industry.

Joel's next release, Songs in the Attic, was composed of live performances of lesser-known songs from the beginning of his career. It was recorded at larger US arenas and in intimate nightclub shows in June and July 1980. This release introduced many fans, who discovered Joel when The Stranger became a smash in 1977, to many of his earlier compositions. The album reached No. 8 on the Billboard chart and produced two hit singles: "Say Goodbye to Hollywood" (No. 17), and "She's Got a Way" (No. 23). It sold over three million copies. Although not as successful as some of his previous albums, it was still considered a success by Joel.

The next wave of Joel's career commenced with the recording of The Nylon Curtain. With it, Joel became more ambitious with his songwriting, which included highly topical songs like "Allentown" and "Goodnight Saigon". Joel has stated that he wanted the album to communicate his feelings about the American Dream and how changes in American politics during the Reagan administration meant that "all of a sudden you weren't going to be able to inherit [the kind of life] your old man had." He also tried to be more ambitious in his use of the recording studio. Joel said that he wanted to "create a sonic masterpiece" on The Nylon Curtain. So he spent more time in the studio, crafting the sound of the album, than he had on any previous album. Production of The Nylon Curtain began in the fall of 1981, but was delayed for several months after Joel was involved in a serious motorcycle accident on April 15, 1982. The bone in his left thumb was crushed and his other wrist dislocated in the incident, when he hit and was flipped over a car which had run a red light at an intersection on Long Island.

In October 1982, Joel embarked on a brief tour to support the album, and recorded his first video special, Live from Long Island, at the Nassau Veterans Memorial Coliseum in Uniondale, New York on December 29. This was first broadcast on HBO on July 24, 1983, before being released on VHS. At the following year's Grammy Awards, it was nominated for the Best Video Album.

The Nylon Curtain went to No. 7 on the charts, partially due to heavy airplay on MTV for the videos to the singles "Allentown" and "Pressure", both directed by Russell Mulcahy.

=== 1983–1988: An Innocent Man and The Bridge ===
Joel's next album moved away from the serious themes of The Nylon Curtain and struck a much lighter tone. An Innocent Man was Joel's tribute to R&B and doo wop music of the 1950s and 1960s and resulted in Joel's second Billboard number-one hit, "Tell Her About It", which was the first single off the album in the summer of 1983. The album itself reached No. 4 on the charts and No. 2 in the UK. It also boasted six top-30 singles, the most of any album in Joel's catalog. The album was well received by critics, with Stephen Thomas Erlewine, senior editor for AllMusic, describing Joel as being "in top form as a craftsman throughout the record, effortlessly spinning out infectious, memorable melodies in a variety of styles."

At the time that the album was released, WCBS-FM began playing "Uptown Girl" both in regular rotation and on the Doo Wop Live. The song became a worldwide hit when released as a single. Originally entitled "Uptown Girls", it was inspired by a chance encounter with Christie Brinkley, Whitney Houston, and Elle Macpherson, who were on a modelling assignment in the Caribbean when they approached Joel whilst he was playing the piano in the bar of their hotel (where he was a holiday guest). The accompanying music video featured Brinkley as a high-society girl who pulls her Rolls-Royce into the gas station where Joel's character is working. At the end of the video, Joel's "grease monkey" character drives off with his "uptown girl" on the back of a motorcycle. When Brinkley went to visit Joel after being asked to star in the video, the first thing Joel said to her upon opening his door was "I don't dance". Brinkley had to walk him through the basic steps he does in the video. Their work together on this video shoot sparked a relationship between the two which led to their marriage in 1985.

In December, the title song was released as a single and it peaked at No. 10 in the U.S. and No. 8 in the UK, early in 1984. That March, "The Longest Time" was released as a single, peaking at No. 14 on the Hot 100 and No. 1 on the Adult Contemporary chart. That summer, "Leave a Tender Moment Alone" was released and it hit No. 27 while "Keeping the Faith" peaked at No. 18 in January 1985. In the video for "Keeping the Faith", Brinkley appears as a passenger in a convertible Chevrolet. An Innocent Man was also nominated for the Album of the Year Grammy, but lost to Michael Jackson's Thriller.

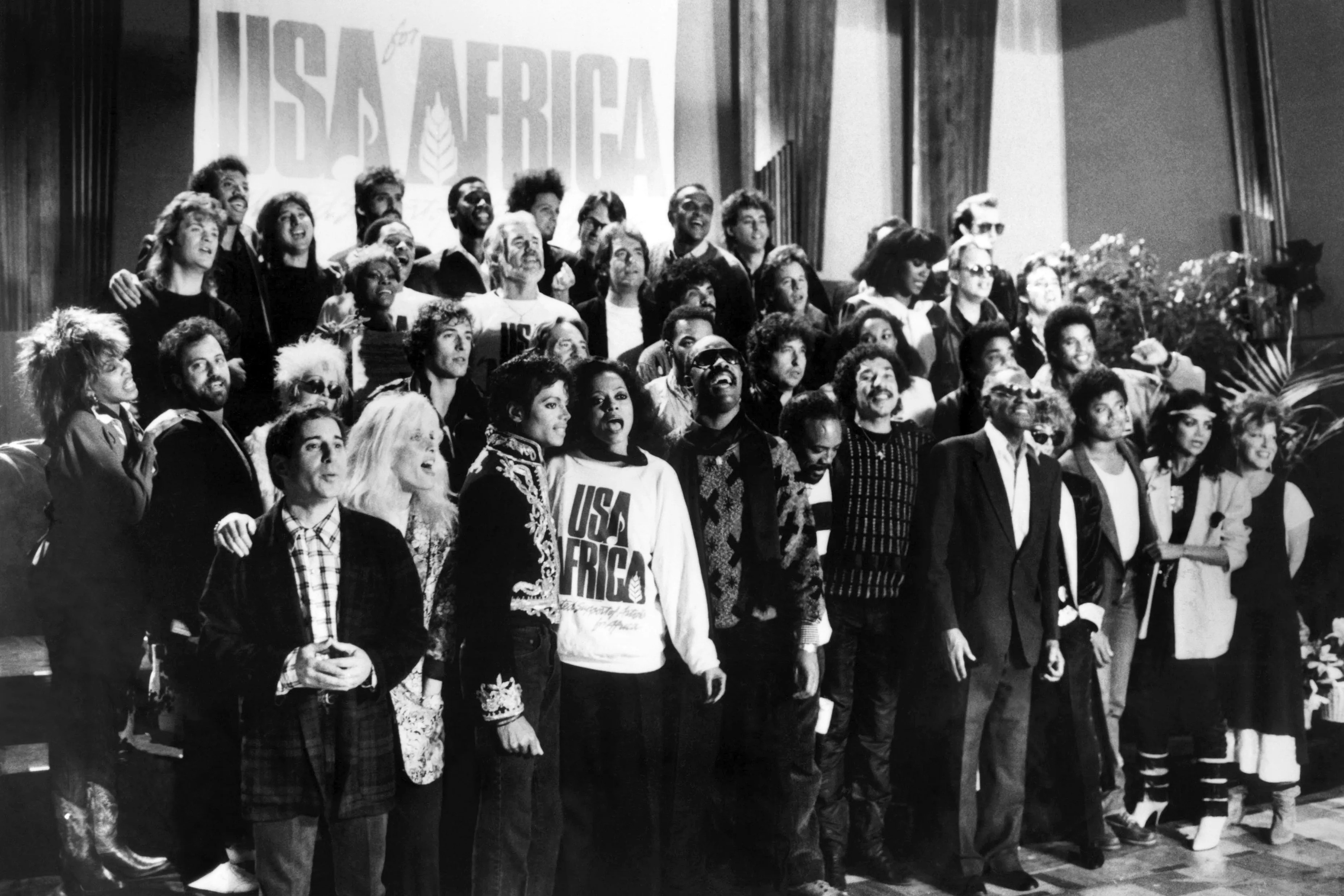
Joel (second row, second from left) with other musicians for the recording of "We Are the World", January 1985

Joel participated in the USA for Africa "We Are the World" project in 1985. Following An Innocent Man, Joel was asked about releasing an album of his most successful singles. This was not the first time this topic had come up, but Joel had initially considered greatest hits albums as marking the end of one's career. This time he agreed, and Greatest Hits Vol. 1 and 2 was released as a four-sided album and two-CD set, with the songs in the order in which they were released. The new songs "You're Only Human (Second Wind)" and "The Night Is Still Young" were recorded and released as singles to support the album; both reached the Top 40, peaking at No. 9 and No. 34, respectively. Greatest Hits was highly successful and it has since been certified double diamond by the RIAA, with over 11.5 million copies (23 million units) sold. It is one of the best-selling albums in American music history, according to the RIAA.

Coinciding with the Greatest Hits album release, Joel released a two-volume Video Album that was a compilation of the promotional videos he had recorded from 1977 to that time. Along with videos for the new singles off the Greatest Hits album, Joel also recorded a video for his first hit, "Piano Man", for this project.

Joel's next album, The Bridge (1986), did not achieve the level of success of his previous studio albums, but it yielded the hits "A Matter of Trust" and "Modern Woman" (both No. 10) from the film Ruthless People, a dark comedy from the directors of Airplane!. The ballad "This is the Time" also charted, peaking at No. 18. On November 18, 1986, an extended version of "Big Man on Mulberry Street" was used on a Season 3 episode of Moonlighting. The Bridge was Joel's last album to carry the Family Productions logo, after which he severed his ties with Artie Ripp. Joel was unsatisfied with most of the songs on The Bridge, but his record company denied a request for time to produce better material. In a 2008 interview, he described it as "not a good album".

In October 1986, Joel and his team started planning a trip to the Soviet Union. This was realized the following July, when he arrived in the country with his wife, daughter Alexa, and full touring band. Following an improvised performance in Tbilisi, Joel gave six concerts at indoor arenas in Moscow and Leningrad, to a combined audience possibly in excess of 100,000 people. The entourage was filmed for television and video to offset the cost of the trip, and the concerts were simulcast on radio around the world. Joel's Russian tour was the first live rock radio broadcast in Soviet history. The tour was later cited frequently as one of the first fully staged pop rock shows to come to the Soviet Union, although in reality other artists had previously toured in the country, including Elton John, James Taylor, and Bonnie Raitt.

Most of that audience took a long while to warm up to Joel's energetic show, something that had never happened in other countries he had performed in. According to Joel, each time the fans were hit with the bright lights, anybody who seemed to be enjoying themselves froze. In addition, people who were "overreacting" were removed by security. During this concert, Joel, enraged by the bright lights, flipped his electric piano and snapped a microphone stand while continuing to sing. Joel later apologized for the incident.

The concerts in Russia came after an intensive series of European shows and after doing interviews during the day, Joel found himself playing at venues where the PA system was "second rate at best". Released against his wishes in October 1987, Концерт (Russian for "Concert"), a live double album recorded during the tour, included cover versions of Bob Dylan's "The Times They Are a-Changin" and the Beatles's "Back in the U.S.S.R.". The latter was released as a single but failed to make the Billboard Hot 100 in the US, and the album was Joel's first since Cold Spring Harbor not to achieve Gold disc status.

=== 1988–1993: Storm Front and River of Dreams ===
The animated film Oliver & Company (1988) features Joel in a rare voice acting role as Dodger, a sarcastic Jack Russell based on Dickens's Artful Dodger. The character's design is based on Joel's image at the time, including his trademark Wayfarer sunglasses. Joel also sang his character's song "Why Should I Worry?".

The recording of Storm Front, which commenced in 1988, coincided with major changes in Joel's career and inaugurated a period of serious upheaval in his business affairs. In August 1989, just before the album was released, Joel dismissed his manager (and former brother-in-law) Frank Weber after an audit revealed major discrepancies in Weber's accounting. Joel subsequently sued Weber for US$90 million, claiming fraud and breach of fiduciary duty, and in January 1990, Joel was awarded US$2 million in a partial judgment against Weber; in April, the court dismissed a US$30 million countersuit filed by Weber.

The first single for the album, "We Didn't Start the Fire", was released in September 1989 and it became Joel's third—and most recent—US number-one hit, spending two weeks at the top. Storm Front was released in October, and it eventually became Joel's first number-one album since Glass Houses, nine years earlier. Storm Front was Joel's first album since Turnstiles to be recorded without Phil Ramone as producer. For this album, he wanted a new sound, and worked with Mick Jones of Foreigner. Joel is also credited as one of the keyboard players on Jones's 1988 self-titled solo album, and is featured in the official video for Jones's single "Just Wanna Hold"; Joel can be seen playing the piano while his then-wife Christie Brinkley joins him and kisses him. Joel also revamped his backing band, dismissing everyone but drummer Liberty DeVitto, guitarist David Brown, and saxophone player Mark Rivera, and bringing in new faces, including multi-instrumentalist Crystal Taliefero.

Storm Front's second single, "I Go to Extremes" reached No. 6 in early 1990. The album was also notable for its song "Leningrad", written after Joel met a clown in the Soviet city of that name during his tour in 1987, and "The Downeaster Alexa", written to underscore the plight of fishermen on Long Island who are barely able to make ends meet. Another well-known single from the album is the ballad "And So It Goes" (No. 37 in late 1990). The song was originally written in 1983, around the time Joel was writing songs for An Innocent Man; but "And So It Goes" did not fit that album's retro theme, so it was held back until Storm Front. Joel said in a 1996 master class session in Pittsburgh that Storm Front was a turbulent album and that "And So It Goes", as the last song on the album, portrayed the calm and tranquility that often follows a violent thunderstorm.

In September 1992, Joel filed a US$90 million lawsuit against his former lawyer Allen Grubman, alleging a wide range of offenses including fraud, breach of fiduciary responsibility, malpractice and breach of contract. The case was settled out of court in the fall of 1993 for US$3 million paid to Joel by third party Sony America, to protect its subsidiary Sony Music's interests, as it had several other artists also using Grubman's law firm.

In 1992, Joel inducted the R&B duo Sam & Dave into the Rock & Roll Hall of Fame. That year, Joel also started work on River of Dreams, finishing the album in early 1993. Its cover art was a colorful painting by Christie Brinkley that was a series of scenes from each of the songs on the album. The first single "The River of Dreams" reached No. 3 on Billboard's Hot 100 and ranked at No. 21 on the 1993 year-end chart. In addition to the title track, the album includes the hits "All About Soul" (with Color Me Badd on backing vocals) and "Lullabye (Goodnight, My Angel)", written for his daughter, Alexa. A radio remix version of "All About Soul" can be found on The Essential Billy Joel (2001), and a demo version appears on My Lives (2005).

The song "The Great Wall of China" was written about his ex-manager Frank Weber and was a regular in the setlist for Joel's 2006 tour. "2000 Years" was prominent in the millennium concert at Madison Square Garden, December 31, 1999, and "Famous Last Words" closed the book on Joel's pop songwriting for more than a decade.

=== 1994–2013: Touring and new singles ===
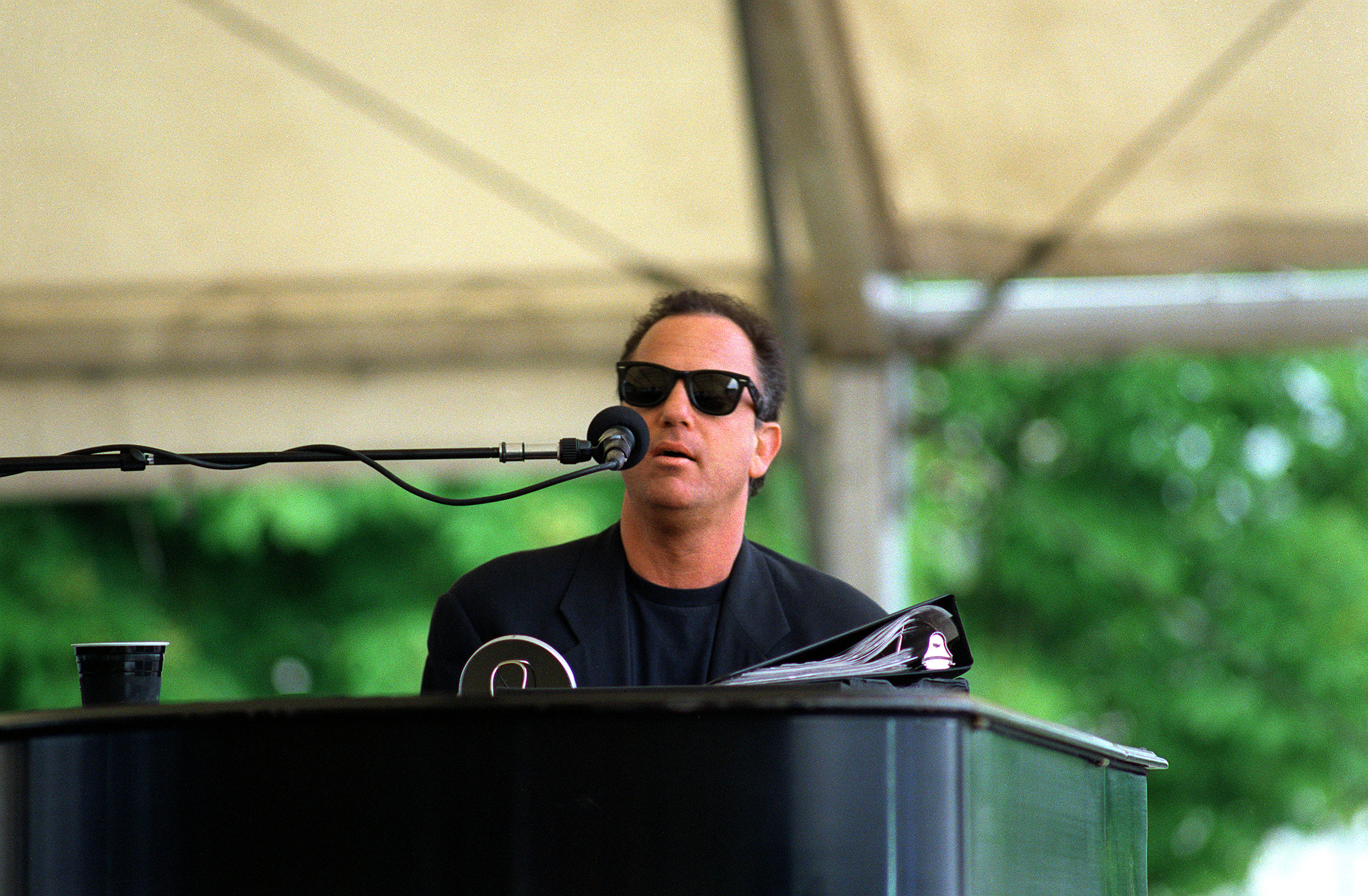
Joel performing in June 1994

Beginning in 1994, Joel toured extensively with Elton John on a series of "Face to Face" tours, making them the longest running and most successful concert tandem in pop music history. During these shows, the two played their own songs, sang each other's songs, and performed duets. They grossed over US$46 million in just 24 dates in their sold out 2003 tour. Joel and John resumed their Face to Face tour in March 2009 and it continued until March 2010, where it ended in Albany, New York, at the Times Union Center. In February 2010, Joel denied rumors in the trade press that he canceled a summer 2010 leg of the tour, claiming there were never any dates booked and that he intended to take the year off. Joel told Rolling Stone: "We'll probably pick it up again. It's always fun playing with him."

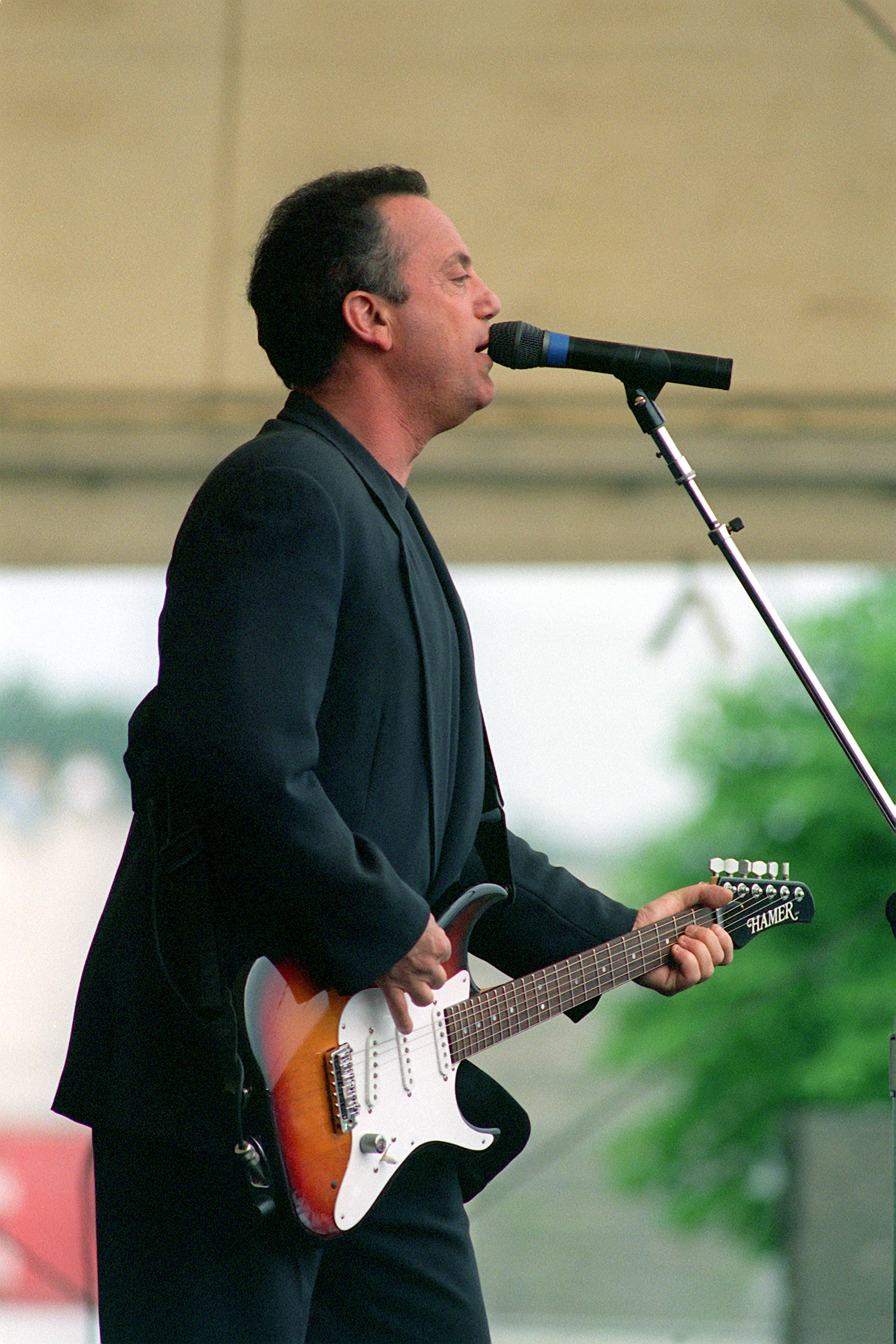
Joel performing in June 1994

Joel and Christie Brinkley announced on April 13, 1994, that they had separated, and their divorce was finalized in August 1994. The two remained friends.

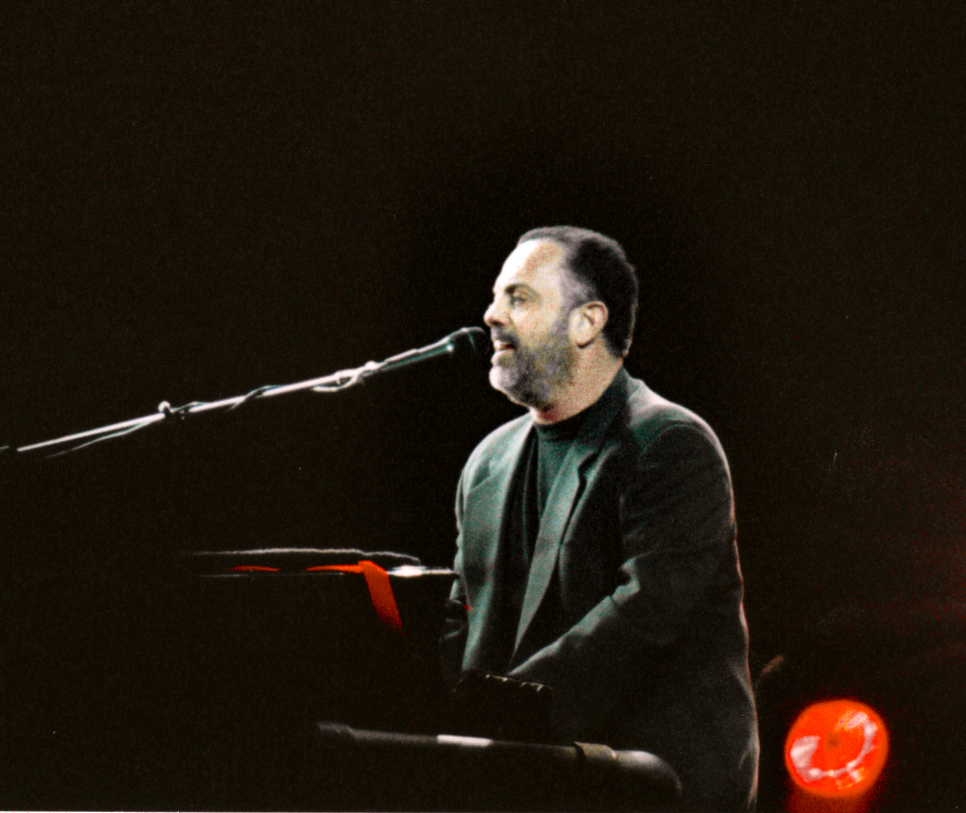
Joel performing at Madison Square Garden, c. 1995

Joel's Greatest Hits Volume III yielded "To Make You Feel My Love" (a Bob Dylan cover) and "Hey Girl". During his Central Park concert in 1997, Joel performed with Garth Brooks, who had reached No. 1 on Billboard's country charts in 1991 with a recording of the song "Shameless" from Joel's 1989 album. On March 15, 1999, Joel was inducted into the Rock and Roll Hall of Fame by Ray Charles. In his speech, Charles mentioned "Baby Grand", the duet Joel had written for them which appeared on his 1986 album The Bridge.

On October 4, 1997, two classical piano pieces composed by Joel, "The Soliloquy" and "Reverie", were first heard in public. Both played by Yuliya Gorenman at the Seiji Ozawa Hall in Lenox, Massachusetts, a recording of her performance of "Reverie" was broadcast nine days later on WNYC-FM and WSHU-FM.

On December 31, 1999, Joel performed at New York's Madison Square Garden. At the time, Joel said that it would be his last tour and possibly his last concert. Two of his performances from that night, "We Didn't Start the Fire" and "Scenes from an Italian Restaurant" were filmed and featured that night as part of ABC's special New Year's Y2K coverage. The concert (dubbed The Night of the 2000 Years) ran for close to four hours and was later released as 2000 Years: The Millennium Concert.

In 2001, Joel released Fantasies & Delusions, a collection of classical piano pieces composed by Joel and performed by Hyung-ki Joo. Joel often uses bits of these pieces as interludes in live performances, and some of them are part of the score for the hit show Movin' Out. The album topped the classical charts at No. 1.

In 2003, Joel inducted the Righteous Brothers into the Rock and Roll Hall of Fame, noting that his song "Until the Night" from the album 52nd Street was a tribute to the duo.

In 2005, Columbia released a box set, My Lives, which is largely a compilation of demos, b-sides, live/alternative versions, and even a few Top 40 hits. The compilation also includes the software that permits people to remix "Zanzibar" and a live version of "I Go to Extremes" with their PC. A DVD of a show from the River of Dreams tour is included.

On January 7, 2006, Joel began a tour across the U.S. Having not released any new songs in 13 years, he featured a sampling of songs from throughout his career, including major hits as well as deep cuts like "Zanzibar" and "All for Leyna". Between January 23 and April 24, his 12 performances at Madison Square Garden broke the venue's record for the most consecutive sold-out concerts by an artist during the same tour (the previous best was 10 shows, set by Bruce Springsteen in 2000). This achievement earned Joel the first retired number (12) in the arena's history to be given to a non-athlete. The same honor has been bestowed on Joel at Xfinity Mobile Arena (formerly the Wells Fargo Center) in Philadelphia, where a banner in the colors of the Philadelphia Flyers is hung honoring Joel's 48 sold-out Philadelphia shows. On June 13, 2006, Columbia released 12 Gardens Live, a double album containing 32 live recordings from a collection of the 12 different shows at Madison Square Garden during Joel's 2006 tour.

Joel visited the United Kingdom and Ireland for the first time in many years as part of the European leg of his 2006 tour. On July 31, 2006, Joel performed a free concert in Rome, with the Colosseum as the backdrop.

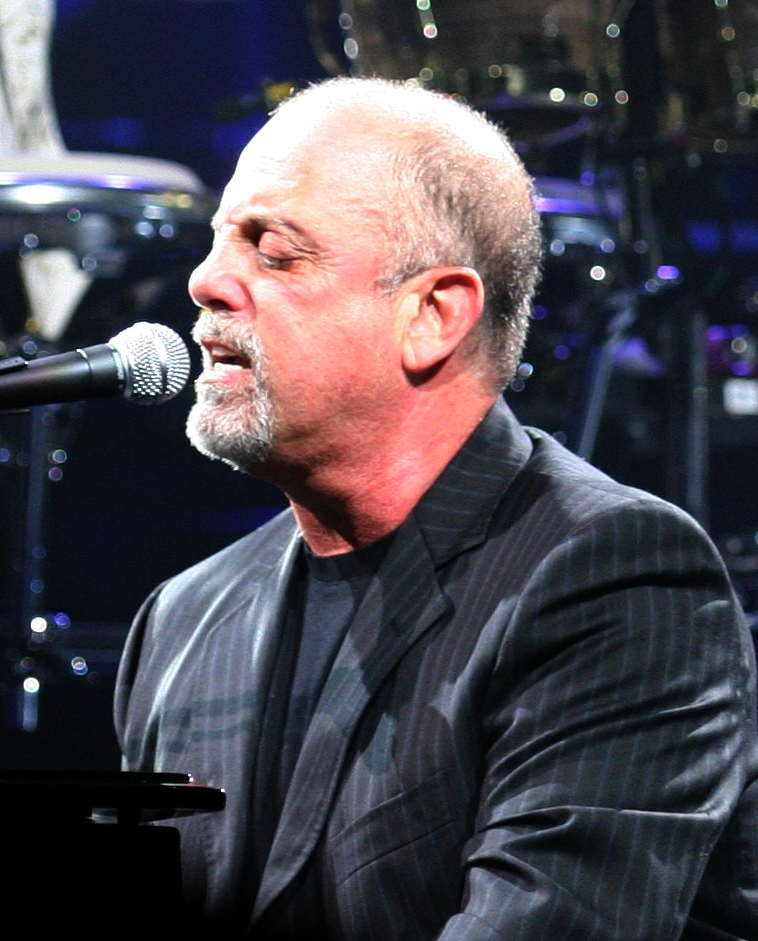
Joel performing in Jacksonville, Florida in February 2007

Joel toured South Africa, Australia, Japan and Hawaii in late 2006, and subsequently toured the Southeastern U.S. in February and March 2007 before hitting the Midwest in the spring of 2007. A new song, titled "All My Life", was Joel's newest single (with second track "You're My Home", live from Madison Square Garden 2006 tour) and was released in stores on February 27, 2007. On February 4, Joel sang the national anthem for Super Bowl XLI, becoming the second to sing the national anthem twice at a Super Bowl, after Aaron Neville.

On December 1, 2007, Joel premiered his new song "Christmas in Fallujah". The song was performed by Cass Dillon, a new Long Island-based musician, as Joel felt it should be sung by someone in a soldier's age range (though he himself has played the song occasionally in concert.) The track was dedicated to servicemen based in Iraq. Joel wrote it in September 2007 after reading numerous letters sent to him from American soldiers in Iraq. "Christmas in Fallujah" is only the second pop/rock song released by Joel since 1993's River of Dreams. Proceeds from the song benefited the Homes For Our Troops foundation.

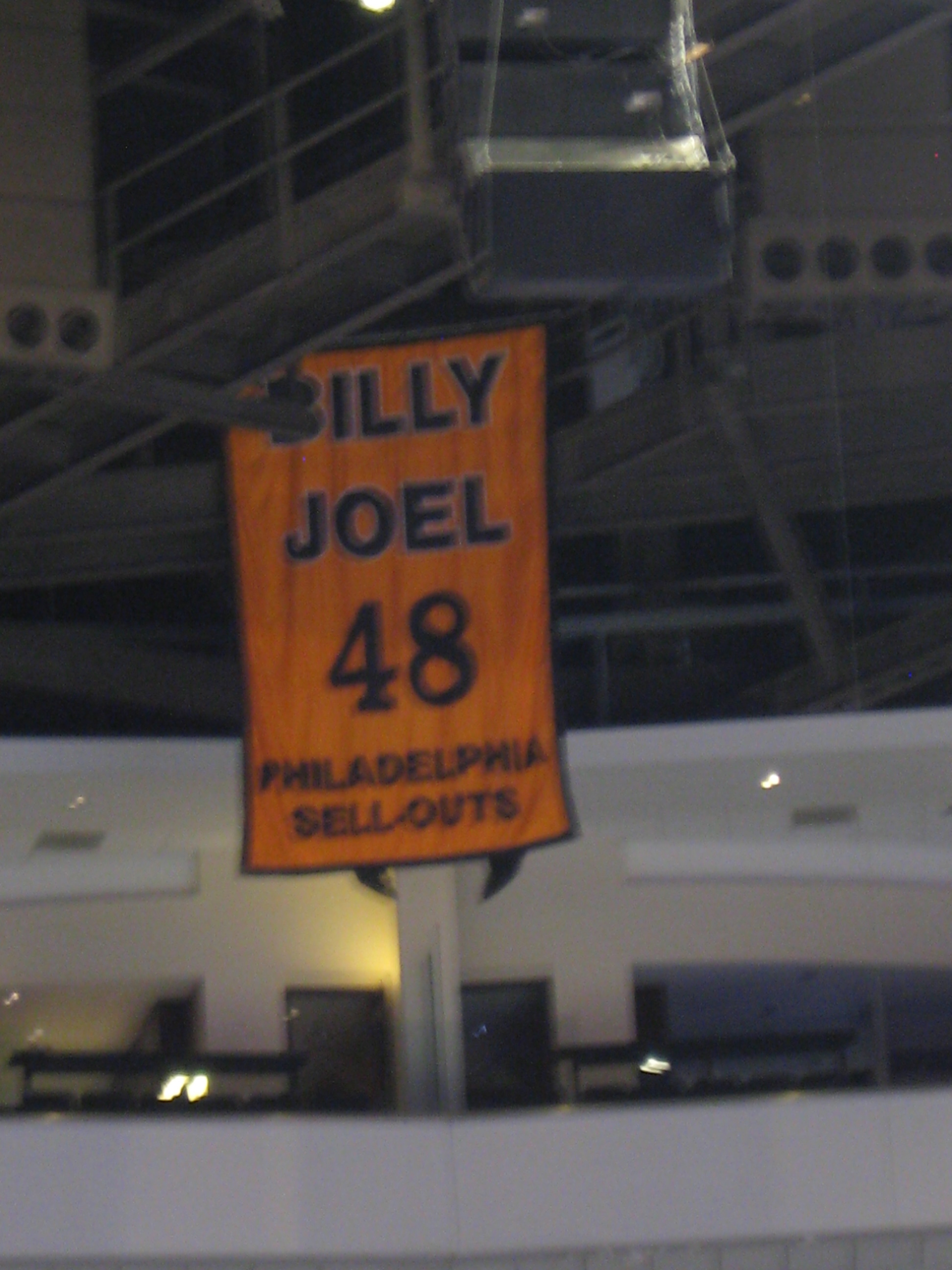
A banner at Xfinity Mobile Arena in Philadelphia, commemorating Joel's 48 consecutive sold-out concerts at the Philadelphia venue as of 2008

On January 26, 2008, Joel performed with the Philadelphia Orchestra at the city's Academy of Music 151st anniversary concert. The event premiered an orchestral version of his classical piano piece "Waltz No. 2 (Steinway Hall)" from Fantasies & Delusions, arranged by Brad Ellis and the composer. Accompanied throughout by the orchestra, Joel's 44-minute set included some of his lesser-known songs, such as "Scandinavian Skies" and "Where's the Orchestra?" from The Nylon Curtain, as well as "Uptown Girl", which he had largely dropped from his live repertoire. The concert and associated ball were part of the academy's fund-raising efforts to establish a "Billy Joel Fund for Music Education", to which the singer donated his fee for the evening.

On March 10, 2008, Joel inducted his friend John Mellencamp into the Rock and Roll Hall of Fame.

Joel sold out 10 concerts at the Mohegan Sun Casino in Uncasville, Connecticut from May to July 2008. On June 19, 2008, Joel played a concert at the grand re-opening of Caesars Windsor (formerly Casino Windsor) in Windsor, Ontario, Canada, to an invite-only crowd for Casino VIPs. His mood was light and joke-filled, even introducing himself as "Billy Joel's dad" and stating "you guys overpaid to see a fat bald guy". He also admitted that Canadian folk-pop musician Gordon Lightfoot was the musical inspiration for "She's Always A Woman".

On July 16 and 18, 2008, Joel played the final concerts at Shea Stadium before its demolition. His guests included Tony Bennett, Don Henley, John Mayer, John Mellencamp, Steven Tyler, Roger Daltrey, Garth Brooks and Paul McCartney. The concerts were featured in the 2010 documentary film Last Play at Shea. The film was released on DVD on February 8, 2011. The CD and DVD of the show, Live at Shea Stadium, were released a month later on March 8.

On December 11, 2008, Joel recorded his own rendition of "Christmas in Fallujah" during a concert at Acer Arena in Sydney and released it as a live single in Australia only. It is the only official release of Joel performing "Christmas in Fallujah", as Cass Dillon sang on the 2007 studio recording and the handful of times the song was played live in 2007. Joel sang the song throughout his December 2008 tour of Australia.

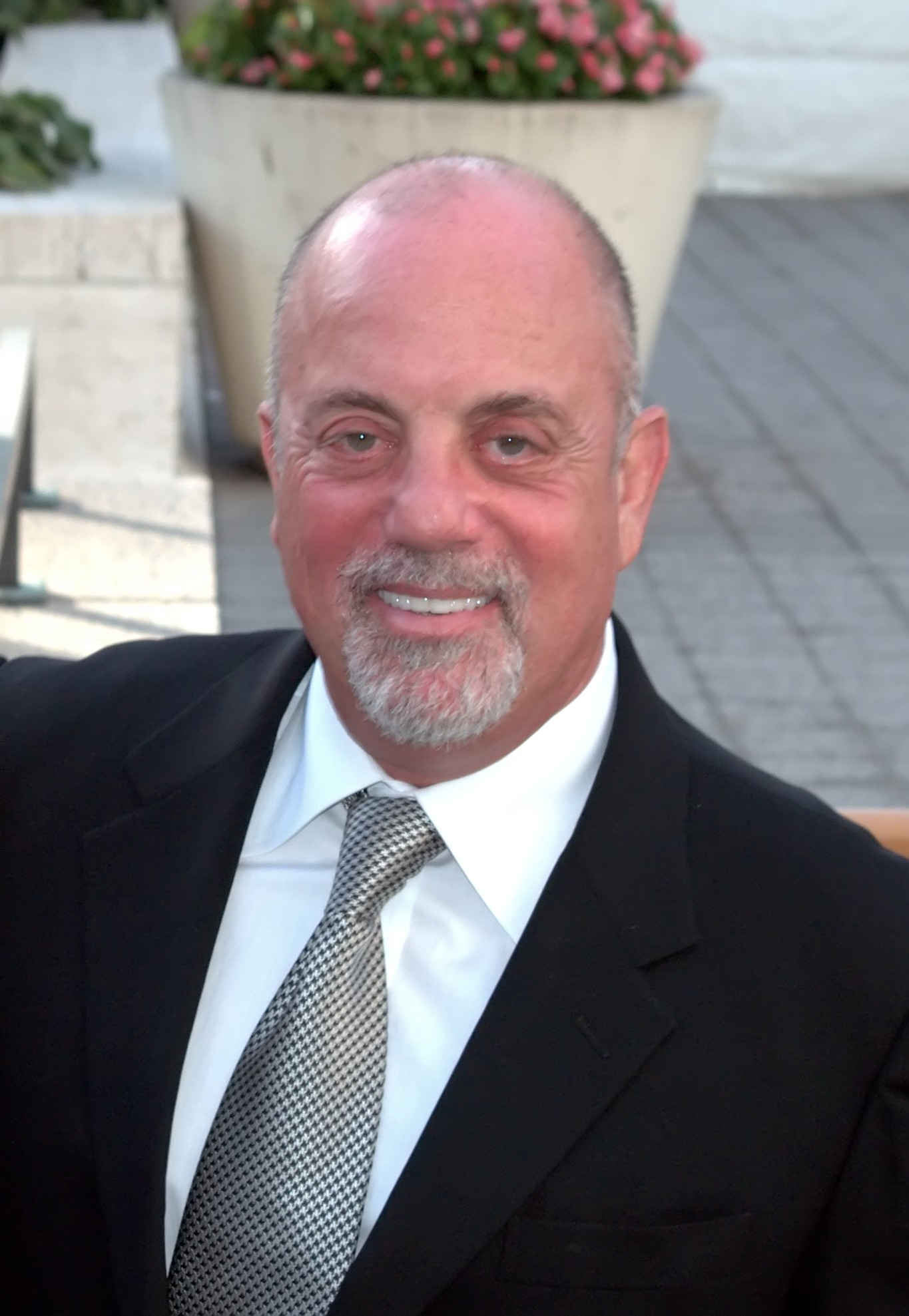
Joel in 2009

On May 19, 2009, Joel's former drummer, Liberty DeVitto, filed a lawsuit in New York City claiming he was owed over 10 years of royalty payments by Joel and Sony Music. DeVitto had never been given songwriting or arranging credit on any of Joel's songs, but he claimed that he helped arrange some of them, including "Only the Good Die Young". In April 2010, it was announced that Joel and DeVitto amicably resolved the lawsuit.

To mark the 40th anniversary of the release of Joel's debut album, Cold Spring Harbor, it was announced on his official website that Columbia/Legacy Recordings planned "to celebrate the occasion with a definitive reissue project of newly restored and expanded Legacy editions of Joel's complete catalog, newly curated collections of rarities from the vaults, previously unavailable studio tracks and live performances, home video releases and more", although this project was never fully realized. Piano Man was re-released in a two-disc Legacy edition in November 2011, with Joel's 1972 live radio concert at WMMR-FM in Philadelphia comprising the second disc.

In 2012, Joel signed an exclusive worldwide publishing agreement with Universal Music Publishing Group (UMPG) and its subsidiary Rondor Music International, who together replaced EMI Music Publishing in managing his catalog outside the US. Additionally, the agreement marked the first time since Joel regained control of his publishing rights in the 1980s that he began to use an administrator to handle his catalog within the U.S. The agreement's focus is on increasing the use of Joel's music in movies, television programs and commercials.

On December 12, 2012, Joel performed as part of 12-12-12: The Concert for Sandy Relief at Madison Square Garden, a concert held for all the victims of Hurricane Sandy. He changed the lyrics to "Miami 2017 (Seen the Lights Go Out on Broadway)" to make it relate to all the damage caused by Sandy.

In May 2013, it was announced that Joel would hold his first ever indoor Irish concert at the O_{2} in Dublin on November 1. He subsequently announced his return to the UK for the first time in seven years to perform in October and November. Joel played in Manchester and Birmingham as well as London's Hammersmith Apollo. In October, Joel held a surprise concert on Long Island at The Paramount (Huntington, New York) to benefit Long Island Cares. The venue holds a capacity of 1,555 and sold out in five minutes. Joel headlined a solo arena concert in New York City for the first time since 2006 when he performed at Barclays Center in Brooklyn on December 31, 2013.

In December 2013, Joel would be named as Madison Square Garden's first ever music "franchise." With this honor, Joel would also join the New York Knicks, New York Rangers and New York Liberty in being recognized as an original Madison Square Garden franchise.

=== 2014–present: Madison Square Garden residency, "Turn the Lights Back On", recent health updates and possible retirement ===
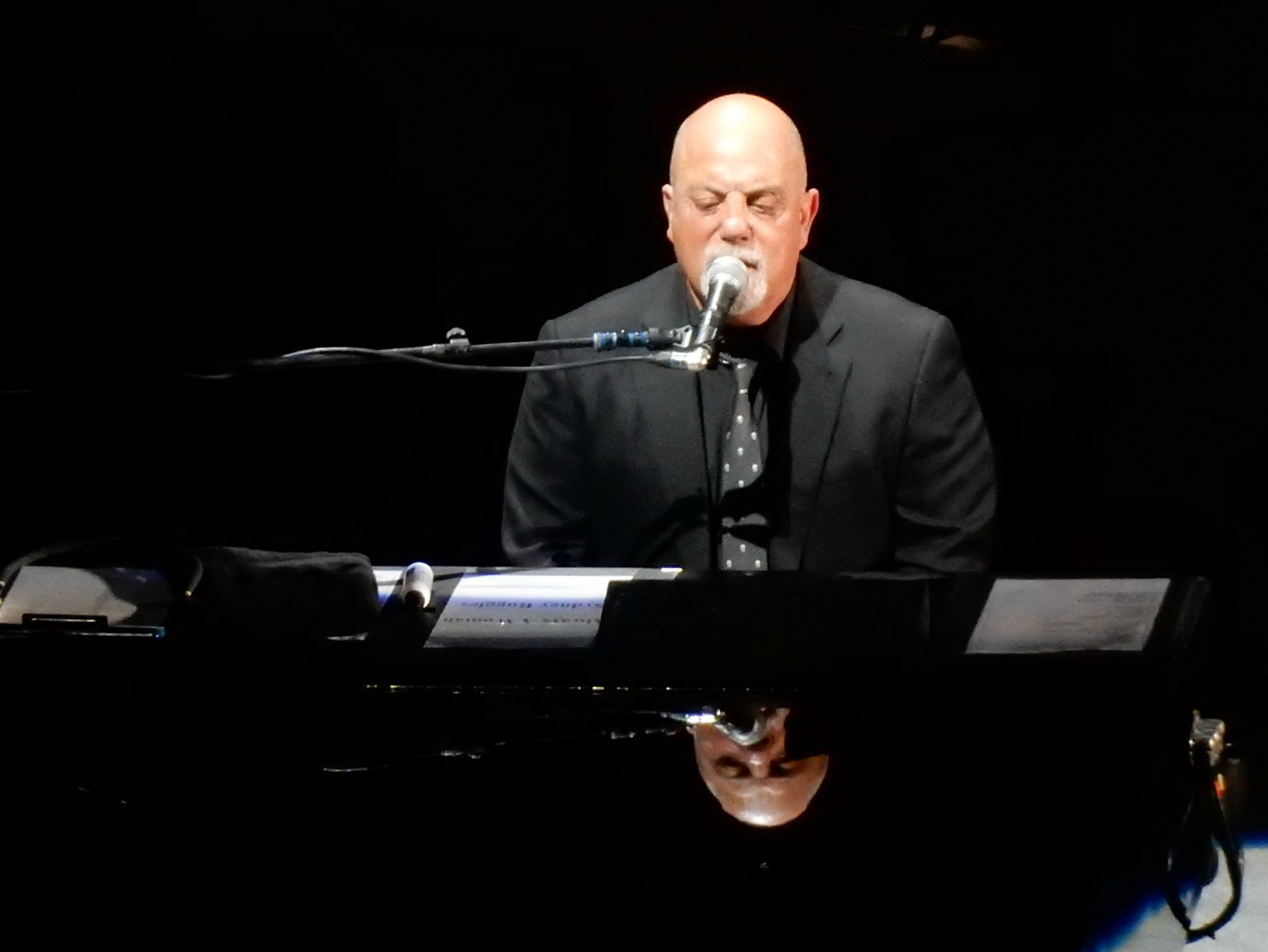
Joel performing at Madison Square Garden in April 2016

Joel announced a concert residency at Madison Square Garden, playing one concert a month indefinitely, starting January 27, 2014. The first MSG show also launched the Billy Joel in Concert tour, which continued at the Amway Center (in Orlando, Florida) where Joel performed several cover songs such as Elton John's "Your Song", Billy Preston's "You Are So Beautiful" (in tribute to Joe Cocker), the Beatles' "With a Little Help from My Friends", "Can't Buy Me Love" and "When I'm 64", Robert Burns' "Auld Lang Syne" and AC/DC's "You Shook Me All Night Long" (with Brian Johnson). Joel also performed an unusual set, including the song "Souvenir" (from 1974's Streetlife Serenade) and excluding "We Didn't Start the Fire".

In January 2015, Joel broke the previous record he set in 2006 for most consecutive shows at Madison Square Garden after performing his 13th consecutive show, which also resulted in a new banner being raised to the Madison Square Garden rafters. Throughout 2015, Joel performed 21 concerts in addition to his monthly Madison Square Garden residency. His August 4, 2015, engagement at Nassau Coliseum was the final concert prior to the arena undergoing a US$261 million renovation. Joel returned to Nassau Coliseum on April 5, 2017, to play the first concert at the newly renovated venue. Later that month, he played the first concert at Atlanta's new SunTrust Park, the suburban home of the Atlanta Braves. On June 24, Joel returned to Hicksville High School 50 years after his would-be graduating class received their diplomas, to deliver the honorary commencement address. It was also the 25th anniversary of receiving his own diploma from the same high school.

On October 7–8, 2016, Colorado College in Colorado Springs hosted the first academic conference on Joel. Entitled "'It's Still Rock and Roll to Me': The Music and Lyrics of Billy Joel", the event was open to the public, and the singer participated by giving an hour-long phone interview for the benefit of the 300 attendees.

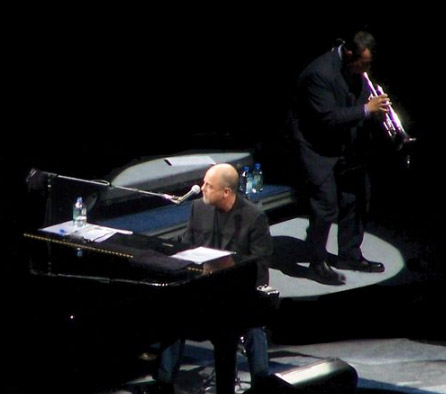
Joel at Madison Square Garden in June 2019

In 2019, Joel announced a concert at Camden Yards, home of the Baltimore Orioles, marking the first-ever concert at the baseball stadium. Joel was forced to postpone his concerts between March 2020 and August 2021 due to the COVID-19 pandemic.

Joel and Stevie Nicks jointly announced plans to perform a series of concerts across the United States in 2023, tentatively beginning with SoFi Stadium outside Los Angeles on March 10.

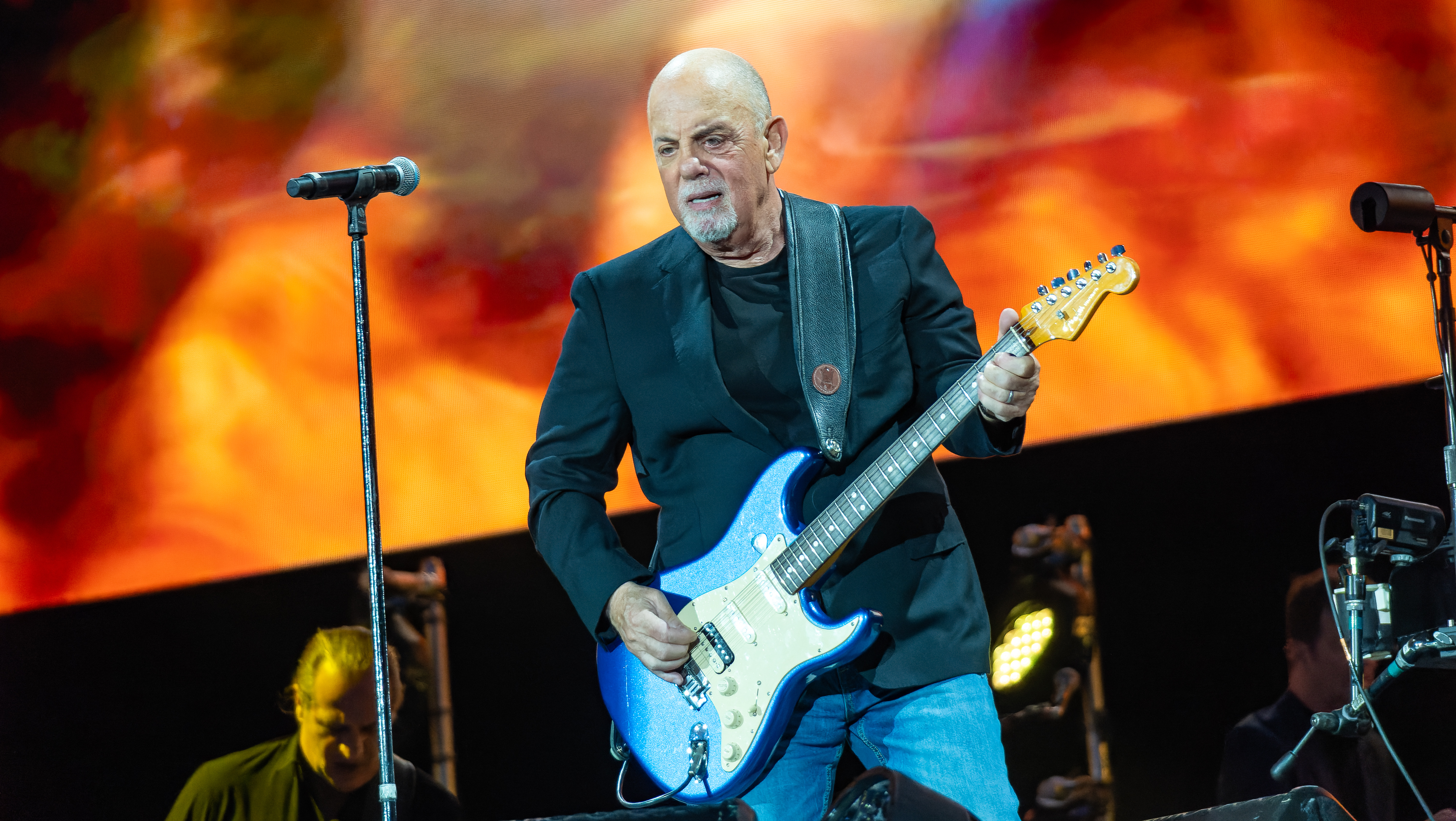
Joel performing at a British Summer Time concert in Hyde Park in July 2023

On June 1, 2023, Joel announced that his residency at Madison Square Garden would end in July 2024 with his 104th performance in the series, marking his 150th lifetime performance at the venue. On January 22, 2024, Joel announced his first new pop single in years (and only his second pop song in more than two decades), "Turn the Lights Back On", which was released on February 1.

On May 23, 2025, Joel canceled every concert on his itinerary following a diagnosis of normal pressure hydrocephalus. By July 2025, Joel told People, as well as Bill Maher, that he felt better.

On June 4, 2025, the first installment of Billy Joel: And So It Goes, a two-part HBO documentary about Joel, premiered at the opening night of the 24th Tribeca Film Festival, New York. It aired on HBO and HBO Max on July 18, with the second part being shown a week later. Shortly afterwards, a 155-track playlist, comprising 115 songs plus audio clips from the documentary, was released on streaming services. This included previously unreleased live and demo recordings, such as Joel's first live performance of "Scenes from an Italian Restaurant" (which was previously seen on Billy Joel's official YouTube channel from Greenvale 1977). On October 15, 2026, Joel revealed that he was still not able to perform or drive due to his ongoing health issues according to his doctor and would be required to “take a series of tests” before knowing when or if he would be able to perform again.

== Filmography ==
=== Film ===
Year	Title	Role	Notes
1988	Oliver & Company	Dodger	Voice role, also song "Why Should I Worry?"
2025	Billy Joel: And So It Goes	Himself	HBO Documentary

== Other ventures ==
In 1996, Joel merged his long-held love of boating with his desire for a second career. He and Long Island boating businessman Peter Needham formed the Long Island Boat Company.

In November 2010, Joel opened 20th Century Cycles, a vintage motorcycle customization business and museum in Oyster Bay, Long Island.

In 2011, Joel announced that he was releasing an autobiography that he had written with Fred Schruers, titled The Book of Joel: A Memoir. The book was originally going to be released in June 2011, but, in March 2011, Joel decided against publishing the book and officially canceled his deal with HarperCollins. Rolling Stone noted, "HarperCollins acquired the book project for US$3 million in 2008. Joel is expected to return his advance on that sum to the publisher." According to Billboard, "the HarperCollins book was billed as an 'emotional ride' that would detail the music legend's failed marriage to Christie Brinkley, as well as his battles with substance abuse." In explaining his decision to cancel the book's release, Joel said, "It took working on writing a book to make me realize that I'm not all that interested in talking about the past, and that the best expression of my life and its ups and downs has been and remains my music." In 2014, Schruers published a biography, simply titled Billy Joel, based on his extensive personal interviews with Joel.

== Personal life ==
=== Marriages and family ===
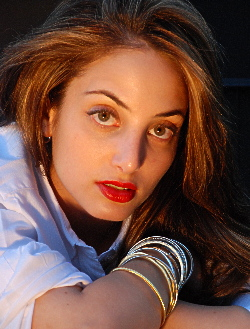
Joel's eldest daughter, Alexa Ray Joel (in 2010), born to Joel and Christie Brinkley in 1985

Joel's first wife was Elizabeth Weber Small. When their relationship began, she was married to Jon Small, his music partner in the short-lived duo Attila, with whom she had a son. When the affair was revealed, Weber severed her relationships with both men. Weber and Joel later reconciled and married in 1973, and she then became his manager. They divorced on July 20, 1982.

Joel married a second time, to model Christie Brinkley, in March 1985. Their daughter, Alexa Ray Joel, was born December 29, 1985. Alexa was given the middle name of Ray after Ray Charles, one of Joel's musical idols. Joel and Brinkley divorced on August 26, 1994. They remain friends, and Joel is the godfather of Brinkley's two youngest children, Jack and Sailor Brinkley Cook.

On October 2, 2004, Joel married chef Katie Lee, his third wife. At the time of the wedding, Lee was 23 and Joel was 55. Joel's daughter, Alexa Ray, then 18, served as the maid of honor. Joel's second wife, Christie Brinkley, attended the union and gave the couple her blessing. On June 17, 2009, they announced their separation.

On July 4, 2015, Joel married a fourth time, to Alexis Roderick, an equestrian and former Morgan Stanley executive, at his Oyster Bay estate on Long Island. He was 66 and she was 33. Governor of New York Andrew Cuomo conducted the ceremony. The couple has been together since 2009. In August 2015, the couple had a daughter. Their second daughter was born in October 2017. His two younger daughters attend school in Florida, where the family now lives.

=== Homes ===
Following the birth of their daughter Alexa, in 1986 Joel and his wife Christie Brinkley moved to a house in Amagansett, New York, for which it was reported that he paid US$2.9 million. In 2002, he sold the property to comedian Jerry Seinfeld for US$32.5 million (then the most expensive house purchase in the history of New York State).

In 2002, Joel bought an estate in Centre Island, New York in the town of Oyster Bay for US$22 million. He also owns a house in Sag Harbor. In 2023, Joel put his Oyster Bay estate on the market for $49 million. The listing was pulled as the main house was undergoing renovations. The mansion, with its guest houses, pool, beach, and helipad on 26 acres, was again offered for sale in September 2024, asking $49.9 million.

In 2015, Joel purchased a home in Manalapan, Florida. The waterfront residence went on the market in November 2015 for $19.5 million but it was taken off the market and re-listed in 2017 with an asking price of $18.5 million. The property was further reduced to $16.9 million in 2018. In January 2020, the 13,200-square-foot property sold for US$10.3 million.

Having worked on an oyster dredger as a teenager, Joel has a longstanding interest in nautical matters. In 2009, it was reported that he owned a small flotilla of vessels, overseen by a full-time captain. Several of the craft were based on rough designs by Joel, including a 57 ft (17.4 m) boat with a top speed of 50 mph (80.5 km/h) which he had built to commute from Oyster Bay to Manhattan.

=== Health issues ===
In 1970, a career decline and personal tragedies led Joel to a deep depressive period. During this time, he attempted suicide twice. After Joel's affair with Elizabeth Weber Small resulted in the breakup of Attila, and his estrangement from his best friend Jon Small, Joel was evicted from Small's house. "I had no place to live. I was sleeping in laundromats and I was depressed, I think to the point of almost being psychotic," said Joel. Joel's sister, Judy Molinari, who was a medical assistant at the time, had previously given him sleeping pills to help him sleep. Joel's first suicide attempt occurred when he planned to take an overdose of all the pills. This resulted in Joel falling into a coma for several days. When he awoke, Joel was disappointed that his attempt failed, and swore he would "do it right" the second time around. Joel then left a suicide note and attempted to kill himself a second time by drinking furniture polish. Joel later said, "I drank furniture polish. It looked tastier than bleach." Jon Small rushed him to the hospital. Joel checked into Meadowbrook Hospital, where he was put on suicide watch and received treatment for depression. Joel would later pen the song "Tomorrow Is Today", which he describes as a suicide note.

In 1985, Joel recorded "You're Only Human (Second Wind)" as a message to help prevent teen suicide.

In 2002, Joel entered Silver Hill Hospital, a substance abuse and psychiatric center in New Canaan, Connecticut, where he underwent treatment for 10 days. In March 2005, Joel checked into the Betty Ford Center, where he spent 30 days for the treatment of alcohol abuse.

In 2025, Joel was diagnosed with normal pressure hydrocephalus, leading to problems with his hearing, vision, and balance. The diagnosis led to Joel cancelling all his upcoming planned concerts. In July 2025, he stated in interviews People and on Bill Maher's podcast that he was improving, with his condition being treatable. In September 2026, Joel said on SiriusXM's The Billy Joel Channel that he had undergone surgery to have a shunt implanted to drain excess fluid, and that it had improved his memory, balance and ability to function. He added that doctors had told him performing had been giving him "something like a concussion every time I did a show".

Joel has admitted to having a history of alcoholism, though he eventually became sober and has stated that some details regarding his alcohol addiction, such as the claim that Joel reached the point where he received DUI arrests, were exaggerated.

=== Political views and contributions ===
Although Joel has donated money to Democratic candidates, he has never publicly affiliated himself with the Democratic Party. Joel rarely publicly endorses political candidates; however, he did play a benefit with his friend Bruce Springsteen to raise money for Barack Obama's presidential campaign in 2008. Joel has performed at benefit concerts that have helped raise funds for political causes. However, about celebrities endorsing political candidates, Joel has said, "People who pay for your tickets, I don't think they want to hear who you're going to vote for and how you think they should vote."

In 2016, after his sarcastic dedication of "The Entertainer" to then-Republican candidate Donald Trump was interpreted as a genuine endorsement, Joel told the New York Daily News in an email that he would be voting for Hillary Clinton.

Joel endorsed Andrew Cuomo's candidacy for the 2025 New York City mayoral election.

=== Support for fishermen ===
In January 1992, Joel announced that he would donate some of the proceeds from "The Downeaster Alexa" to defend 11 East Hampton fishermen accused of selling striped bass illegally. On July 28, he then joined a related protest by fishermen who claimed regulations were threatening their way of life, saying that he had taken the decision to risk arrest reluctantly but would "hate to see these people disappear." Along with 29 other fishermen and local officials, he was charged by the state Department of Environmental Conservation (DEC) with fishing out of season and using the banned method of haul seining. Although the arguments put forward by the defense were rejected by the judge hearing the case, in March 1993 he found that DEC had cited the wrong law when filing it and therefore dismissed the charges against all defendants.

== Tours ==
Tours

- Cold Spring Harbor Tour (1972)
- Turnstiles Tour (1976)
- The Stranger Tour (1977)
- 52nd Street Tour (1978)
- The Nylon Curtain Tour (1982)
- An Innocent Man Tour (1984)
- The Bridge Tour (1986–87)
- Storm Front Tour (1989–91)
- River of Dreams Tour (1993–95)
- Face to Face 1994 (with Elton John) (1994)
- Face to Face 1995 (with Elton John) (1995)
- An Evening of Questions and Answers (1996)
- Face to Face 1998 (with Elton John) (1998)
- Face to Face 2001 (with Elton John) (2001)
- Face to Face 2002 (with Elton John) (2002)
- Face to Face 2003 (with Elton John) (2003)
- 2006 Tour (2006)
- 2007 Tour (2007)
- 2008 Tour (2008)
- Face to Face 2009 (with Elton John) (2009)
- Face to Face 2010 (with Elton John) (2010)
- Billy Joel in Concert (2014–2025)
- Two Icons – One Night (2023)
- Two Icons – One Night (2024)

Residency

- Billy Joel at the Garden (2014–2024)

== Discography ==
- Cold Spring Harbor (1971)
- Piano Man (1973)
- Streetlife Serenade (1974)
- Turnstiles (1976)
- The Stranger (1977)
- 52nd Street (1978)
- Glass Houses (1980)
- The Nylon Curtain (1982)
- An Innocent Man (1983)
- The Bridge (1986)
- Storm Front (1989)
- River of Dreams (1993)
- Fantasies & Delusions (2001)

== Awards and achievements ==
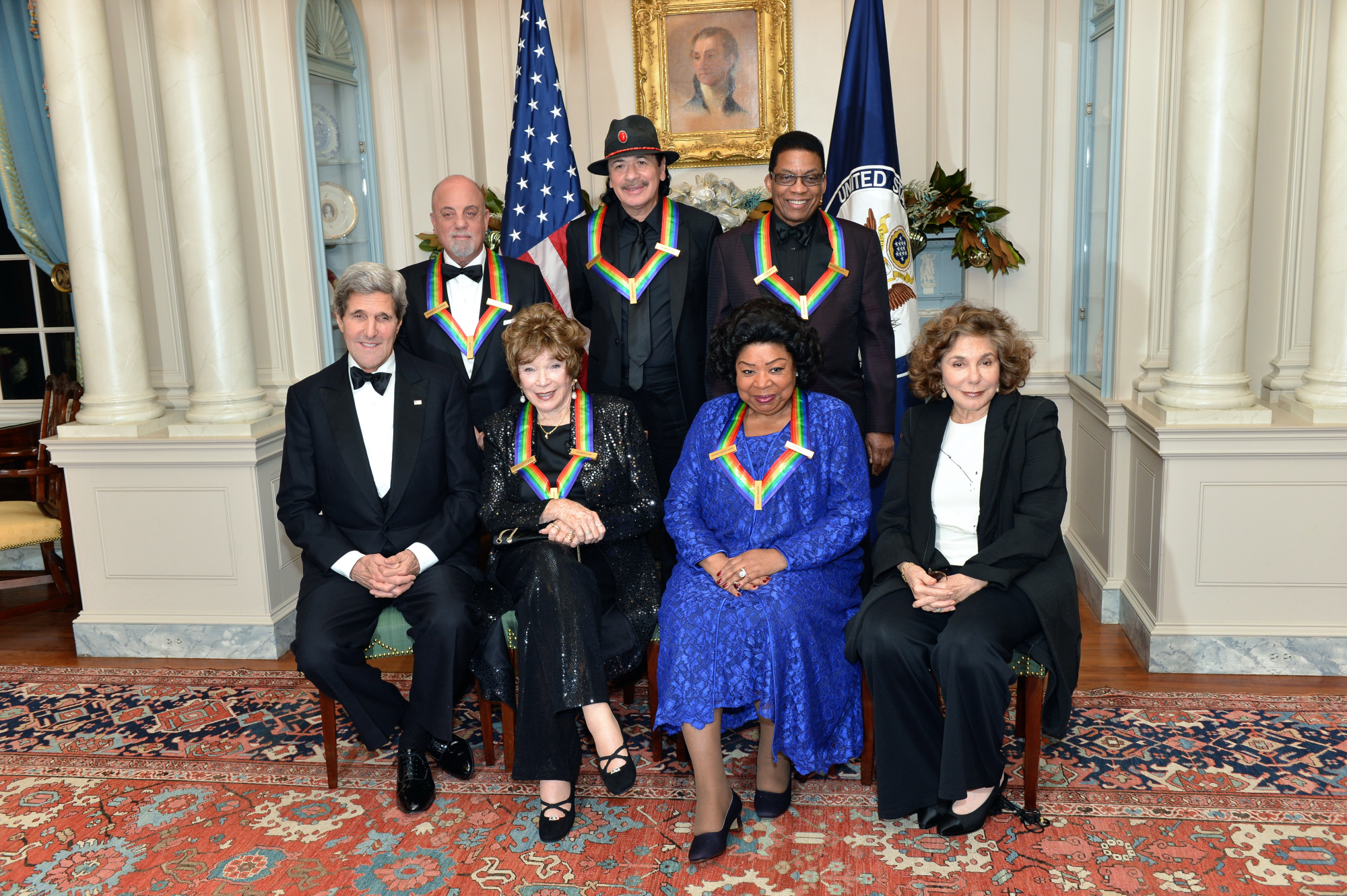
U.S. Secretary of State John Kerry and his wife Teresa Heinz Kerry with the 2013 Kennedy Center Honors recipients (left to right): Shirley MacLaine, Martina Arroyo, Billy Joel, Carlos Santana, and Herbie Hancock

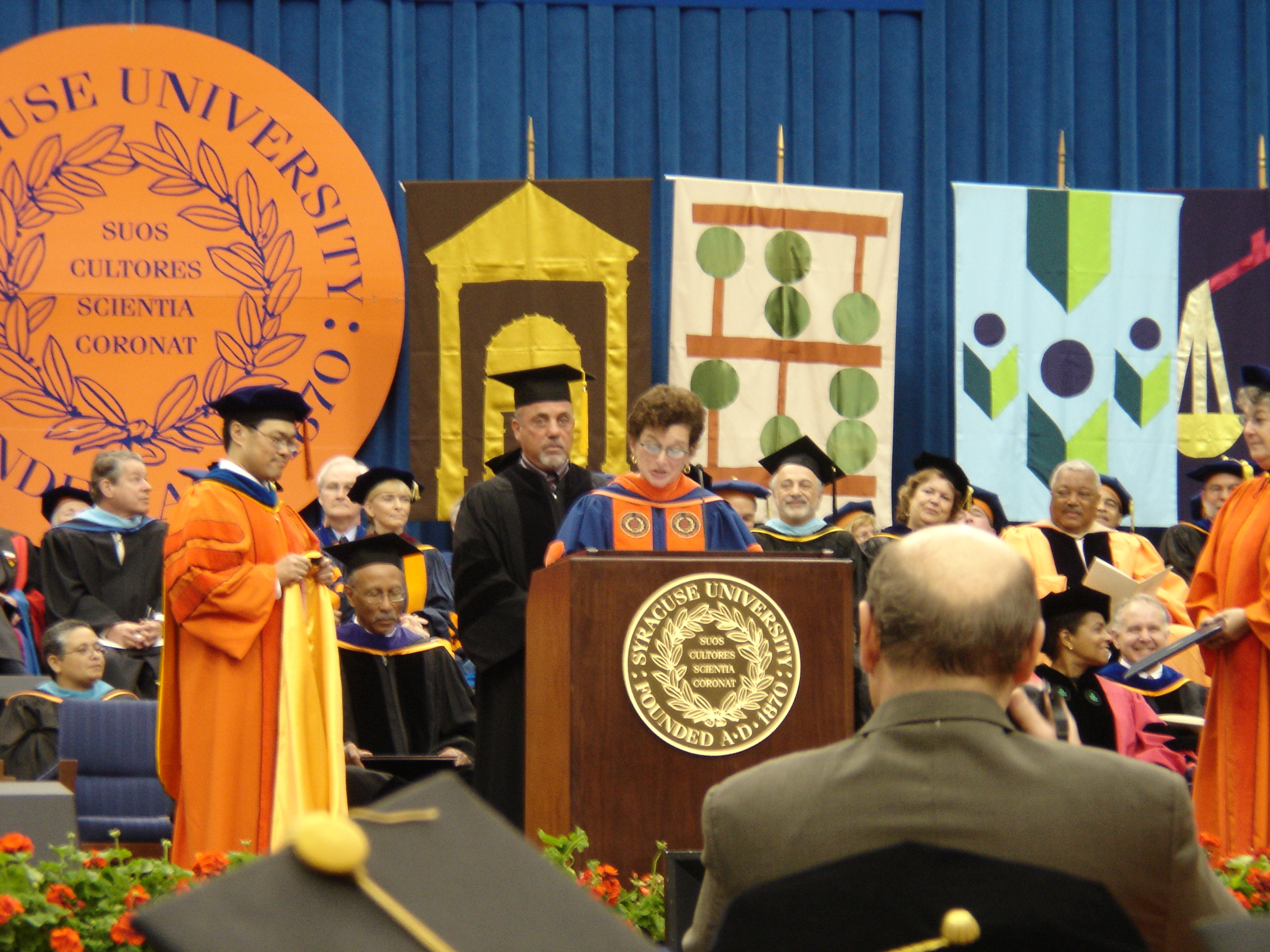
Joel receiving an Honorary Doctorate of Fine Arts from Syracuse University in 2006

Joel graduated well after his high school peers because of a missed English exam. His high school diploma was finally awarded by the school board 25 years later. Joel has been presented with multiple honorary doctorates:

- Doctor of Humane Letters from Fairfield University (1991)
- Doctor of Music from Berklee College of Music (1993)
- Doctor of Humane Letters from Hofstra University (1997)
- Doctor of Music from Southampton College (2000)
- Doctor of Fine Arts from Syracuse University (2006)
- Doctor of Musical Arts from the Manhattan School of Music (2008)
- Doctor of Music from Stony Brook University (2015)

In 1986, Joel was on the site selection committee for the Rock and Roll Hall of Fame board. Seven members of the committee voted for the Hall to be located in San Francisco, and seven voted for Cleveland, Ohio; this tie was broken when Joel voted for Cleveland. Joel was inducted into the Rock and Roll Hall of Fame in Cleveland in 1999 by one of his chief musical influences, Ray Charles, with whom Joel also collaborated on his song "Baby Grand" (1986).

Joel was also named MusiCares Person of the Year for 2002, an award given each year at the same time as the Grammy Awards. At the dinner honoring him, various artists performed Joel's songs, including Nelly Furtado, Stevie Wonder, Jon Bon Jovi, Diana Krall, Rob Thomas and Natalie Cole.

Joel has won six Grammy Awards, including Album of the Year for 52nd Street and Song of the Year and Record of the Year for "Just the Way You Are".

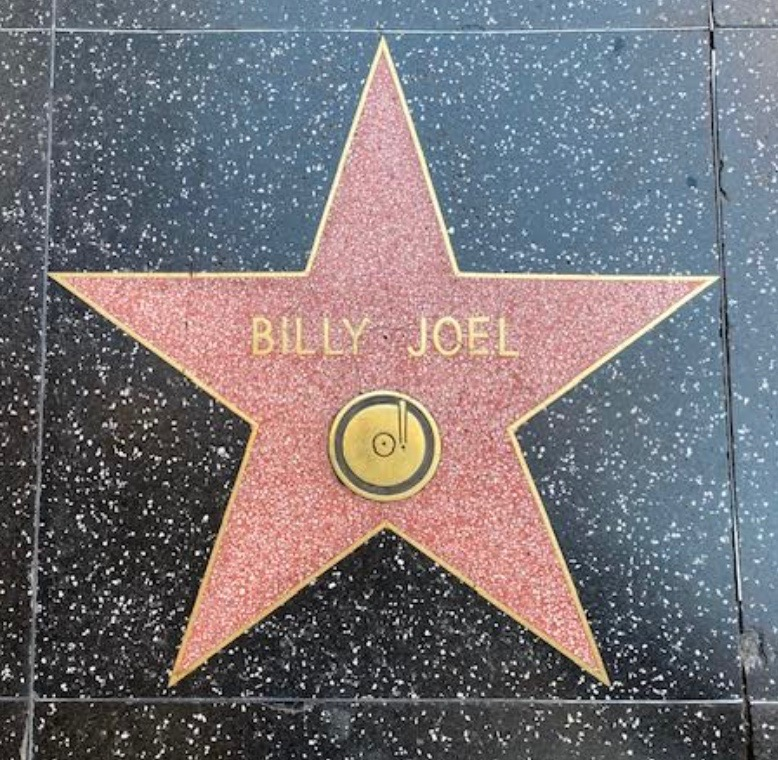
Joel's star on the Hollywood Walk of Fame.

In 1993, Joel was the second entertainer out of 30 persons to be inducted into the Madison Square Garden Walk of Fame. On September 20, 2004, he received a star on the Hollywood Walk of Fame, for his work in the music industry, located at 6233 Hollywood Boulevard. Joel was inducted into the Long Island Music Hall of Fame on October 15, 2006.

Joel is the only performing artist to have played both Yankee and Shea Stadiums, as well as Giants Stadium, Madison Square Garden, and Nassau Veterans Memorial Coliseum. Joel has banners in the rafters of the MVP Arena, Nassau Coliseum, Madison Square Garden, Mohegan Sun Arena in Uncasville, Connecticut, Xfinity Mobile Arena in Philadelphia, Hartford Civic Center in Hartford, and the JMA Wireless Dome in Syracuse.

In 2003, Rolling Stone's 500 Greatest Albums of All Time list included The Stranger at number 67, and 52nd Street at number 352. On their 500 Greatest Songs of All Time list, Rolling Stone included "Piano Man" at number 421.

Joel has also sponsored the Billy Joel Visiting Composer Series at Syracuse University.

On December 12, 2011, Joel became the first non-classical musician honored with a portrait in Steinway Hall.

On December 29, 2013, in Washington, D.C., Joel received Kennedy Center Honors, the nation's highest honor for influencing American culture through the arts.

On July 22, 2014, the Library of Congress announced that Joel would be the sixth recipient of the Gershwin Prize for Popular Song. He received the prize at a performance ceremony in November 2014 from James H. Billington, the Librarian of Congress, and Supreme Court Justice Sonia Sotomayor.

On July 18, 2018, Governor Andrew Cuomo proclaimed the date to be Billy Joel Day in New York state to mark his 100th performance at Madison Square Garden.

On October 19, 2023, a section of Audrey Avenue near Joel's motorcycle museum in his hometown of Oyster Bay was given the ceremonial name "Billy Joel Way" in honor of the musician.

On April 14, 2024, Joel was featured on CBS in commemoration of his 100th performance at Madison Square Garden. The network broadcast an encore presentation of the concert special five nights later, on April 19, after a technical snafu caused the program to cut off before it could properly end.

In 2024, Joel was honored in "Group C Premiere: Billy Joel Night," on The Masked Singer Season 11. The contestants that night sang songs by Joel.

=== Awards and nominations ===
Award	Year	Nominated work	Category	Result	Ref.
American Music Awards	1981	Glass Houses	Favorite Pop/Rock Album	Won	
Brit Awards	1984	Himself	International Artist	Nominated	
Brit Awards	1990	"We Didn't Start the Fire"	British Video of the Year	Nominated	
Brit Awards	1994	Himself	International Male Solo Artist	Nominated	
Grammy Awards	1979	"Just the Way You Are"	Record of the Year	Won	
Grammy Awards	1979	"Just the Way You Are"	Song of the Year	Won	
Grammy Awards	1980	52nd Street	Album of the Year	Won	
Grammy Awards	1980	52nd Street	Best Male Pop Vocal Performance	Won	
Grammy Awards	1980	"Honesty"	Song of the Year	Nominated	
Grammy Awards	1981	Glass Houses	Album of the Year	Nominated	
Grammy Awards	1981	Glass Houses	Best Male Rock Vocal Performance	Won	
Grammy Awards	1983	The Nylon Curtain	Album of the Year	Nominated	
Grammy Awards	1984	An Innocent Man	Album of the Year	Nominated	
Grammy Awards	1984	"Uptown Girl"	Best Male Pop Vocal Performance	Nominated	
Grammy Awards	1985	Billy Joel Live from Long Island	Best Video Album	Nominated	
Grammy Awards	1990	"We Didn't Start the Fire"	Record of the Year	Nominated	
Grammy Awards	1990	"We Didn't Start the Fire"	Song of the Year	Nominated	
Grammy Awards	1990	"We Didn't Start the Fire"	Best Male Pop Vocal Performance	Nominated	
Grammy Awards	1991	Storm Front	Best Male Pop Vocal Performance	Nominated	
Grammy Awards	1991	Himself	Producer of the Year, Non-Classical	Nominated	
Grammy Awards	1991	Himself	Grammy Legend Award	Won	
Grammy Awards	1992	Live at Yankee Stadium	Best Long Form Music Video	Nominated	
Grammy Awards	1992	"When You Wish Upon a Star"	Best Short Form Music Video	Nominated	
Grammy Awards	1994	River of Dreams	Album of the Year	Nominated	
Grammy Awards	1994	"The River of Dreams"	Record of the Year	Nominated	
Grammy Awards	1994	"The River of Dreams"	Song of the Year	Nominated	
Grammy Awards	1994	"The River of Dreams"	Best Male Pop Vocal Performance	Nominated	
Grammy Awards	2002	"New York State of Mind"	Best Pop Collaboration with Vocals	Nominated	
MTV Video Music Awards	1984	"Uptown Girl"	Best Male Video	Nominated	
New York Emmy Awards	2018	Billy Joel: New York State of Mind	Entertainment: Program/Special	Won	
New York Emmy Awards	2020	White Hot Spotlight: Billy Joel and the Greatest Arena Run of All Time	Entertainment: Program/Special	Won	
Primetime Emmy Awards	2002	Billy Joel: In His Own Words	Outstanding Individual Performance in a Variety or Music Program	Nominated	
Primetime Emmy Awards	2024	Billy Joel: The 100th - Live at Madison Square Garden	Outstanding Variety Special (Pre-Recorded)	Nominated	
Tony Awards	2003	Movin' Out	Best Orchestrations	Won	

== See also ==
- Billy Joel Band
- List of atheists in music
- List of best-selling music artists
- List of highest-grossing live music artists
