= Deborah Dir =

American film and stage actress

- Education: Actors Studio
- Occupation: Actress
- Years active: 2000-Present
- Awards: 12 Critic's Choice 2007 for Danny and The Deep Blue Sea LA

Deborah Dir is an American film and stage actress.

== Work ==
In 2001, she made her theatrical debut in Maxim Gorky Summerfolk receiving the Los Angeles critic's choice and garnering several others. Dir went on to originate the role of Ashley in the world premier of George Furth's Sex, Sex, Sex, Sex, Sex, Sex and Sex directed by John Rubinstein and presented by The Actors Studio. In 2003, she starred in the acclaimed production of LeRoi Jones Dutchman, playing Lula opposite Anthony Montgomery from the Star Trek: Enterprise. In 2007, Dir starred in John Patrick Shanley Danny and The Deep Blue Sea with Daniel DeWeldon,. Their Los Angeles revival ran for six months with sold-out audiences receiving 12 acclaimed Critic's Choice's including The LA Times. At the 29th annual LA Weekly theater awards, Danny and The Deep Blue Sea was nominated for best two person show and best production design.

Dir's film credits include The American Connection (2021) Hollyweird (2019) Pig (2011 film) and A Winter Rose (2014) with Taryn Manning. Deborah worked in television Bernie Mac Show, alongside Bernie Mac and Wesley Snipes.
