= It's Still Rock and Roll to Me =

Single by Billy Joel

from the album Glass Houses
- B-side: "Through the Long Night"
- Released: May 12, 1980
- Genre: New wave; doo-wop; rock; rockabilly; pop rock
- Length: 2:57
- Label: Columbia
- Songwriter: Billy Joel
- Producer: Phil Ramone

Billy Joel singles chronology
"You May Be Right" (1980)	"It's Still Rock and Roll to Me" (1980)	"Don't Ask Me Why" (1980)

Music video
- "It's Still Rock and Roll to Me" on YouTube

"It's Still Rock and Roll to Me" is a song written and recorded by Billy Joel, from the album Glass Houses. Released in 1980, the song peaked at number 1 on the Billboard Hot 100 for two weeks, from July 19 through August 1, 1980, making it Joel's first number 1 hit single in the United States. The song spent 11 weeks in the top 10 and was the 7th biggest hit of 1980 according to American Top 40.

The song conveys Joel's criticisms of the music industry and press, commenting on new musical styles of the time such as new wave being mere rehashes of older musical styles. It also addresses changing trends and attitudes of the era.

The single eventually reached platinum status from the RIAA for sales of over 1 million copies in the United States.

== History and composition ==
Joel wrote the song in response to critics who often described his music as adult contemporary, middle-of-the-road pop. He felt that new styles of music were not unlike older styles of music (regardless of marketing). He especially viewed new wave as akin to older genres such as power pop and rock and roll, commenting in an interview with Rolling Stone that "new wave songs, it seems, can only be about two and a half minutes long… only a certain number of instruments can be played on the record – usually a very few… only a certain amount of production is allowed or can be heard… the sound has to be limited to what you can hear in a garage… a return to that sound is all that’s going on now."

The song is in 4/4 time at 144 bpm and is written in C major. It features a saxophone solo before the final verse. According to drummer Liberty DeVitto in an interview, the sound engineer for the song had him tune his snare drum extremely low so that it would "flop" when he played it. The "miracle mile" mentioned in the lyrics refers to a road host to many stores in Manhasset and Great Neck Long Island. The reference to whitewall tires is from the store Best Tire and new speakers is a reference to Berliner Stereo, all locations near the area where Joel spent his childhood.

== Critical reception ==
In a review made a week later after single release, Billboard editors noticed the laconicism of backing support and Joel's vocal that made the song sparkling. Tom Breihan of Stereogum, in a retrospective review, was mixed, referring to it as "a sharp, well-written song" but commenting that it "never takes off". Cash Box said that Joel "throws a few slyly humorous stones… at the present new wave fad" and that the song includes "a torrid sax break". Record World said that "Joel surveys the current rock scene with sharp vocal phrasing & a pulsating rhythm, driving home his pointed lyrical observations."

== Personnel ==
- Billy Joel – lead and backing vocals, acoustic piano, electric piano
- Dave Brown – electric guitar
- Russell Javors – electric guitar
- Doug Stegmeyer – bass
- Liberty DeVitto – drums, percussion
- Richie Cannata – saxophone solo

== Chart history ==
=== Weekly charts ===
Chart (1980–1981)	Peak position
Australia (Kent Music Report)	10
Canada Top Singles (RPM)	1
French Singles Chart	61
Ireland (IRMA)	11
Israel (IBA)	2
New Zealand (Recorded Music NZ)	21
UK Singles (Official Charts)	14
UK Airplay (Record Business)	6
US Billboard Hot 100	1
US Adult Contemporary (Billboard)	45

=== Year-end charts ===
Chart (1980)	Position
Australia (Kent Music Report)	77
Canada	6
US Billboard Hot 100	9

=== All-time charts ===
Chart (1958–2018)	Position
US Billboard Hot 100	303

== Certifications and sales ==
Region	Certification	Certified units/sales
Canada	—	213,000
New Zealand (RMNZ)	Platinum	30,000^{‡}
United Kingdom (BPI)	Silver	200,000^{‡}
United States (RIAA)	4× Platinum	4,000,000^{‡}
^{‡} Sales+streaming figures based on certification alone.

== Music video ==
A music video for the song was made, showing Joel performing the song live with his band. According to his band members, the song vocals were performed live by Joel during the video's filming.

== Covers and parody ==
"Weird Al" Yankovic recorded a parody of the song entitled "It's Still Billy Joel to Me" in 1980, popularized on the Dr. Demento radio program. It was not released, either as a single or an album track. Yankovic commented, "I wrote that in 1980, but even by 1983 (when my first album came out) it felt a bit dated. Also, we figured that Billy wasn’t very likely to give us his blessing on that one anyway, so we never even bothered asking."

The 1987 diss track "The Bridge Is Over" by Boogie Down Productions interpolates the song with new lyrics.

Rapper Kid Rock recorded a version entitled "It's Still East Detroit to Me".

Pop rock musician Drake Bell covered the song in 2014 on his rockabilly album Ready Steady Go!.

== See also ==
- List of Billboard Hot 100 number-one singles of 1980
