= Don't Ask Me Why (Billy Joel song) =

Single by Billy Joel

from the album Glass Houses
- B-side: "C'était Toi (You Were the One)"
- Released: July 24, 1980
- Genre: Bossa nova; yacht rock; folk rock; pop; samba; Latin rock
- Length: 2:59
- Label: Columbia Records
- Songwriter: Billy Joel
- Producer: Phil Ramone

Billy Joel singles chronology
"It's Still Rock and Roll to Me" (1980)	"Don't Ask Me Why" (1980)	"Sometimes a Fantasy" (1980)

"Don't Ask Me Why" is a 1980 song by Billy Joel released as the third single from the album Glass Houses. The song spent two weeks at number one on the Adult Contemporary chart and peaked at number 19 on the Billboard Hot 100.

The track contains all acoustic and Latin percussion instruments performing in an Afro-Cuban rhythmic style. An eclectic, instrumental "Latin Ballroom" piano solo, played over the bridge section after the second verse, is also featured in part of the song; Joel states that the mix for the midsection includes "fifteen pianos overdubbed on top of each other."

The syncopated "333322" accent pattern in the verses is identical to that in the song "Big Shot", from Joel's previous album 52nd Street (1978). The same pattern can be found in other songs of the 1980s, including "Karma Chameleon" (1983) by Culture Club, "Crazy for You" (1985) by Madonna, "Summer of '69" (1985) by Bryan Adams, and "Desire" (1988) by U2.

== Reception ==
Billboard found the song to be "catchy" and felt that Joel's vocal performance sounded similar to Paul McCartney. Cash Box said it has a "crisp pop/Latin/rock rhythm" and that the lyrics deal with the "themes of success and chance." Record World called it "one of [Joel's] easy rollin' romantic piano ballads that often become pop standards."

== Charts ==
=== Weekly charts ===
Chart (1980)	Peak position
Canada RPM Top Singles	4
Canada RPM Adult Contemporary	1
French Singles Chart	42
Israel (IBA)	20
Netherlands (Single Top 100)	42
UK Singles (Record Business)	73
UK Airplay (Record Business)	6
US Billboard Hot 100	19
US Billboard Adult Contemporary	1
US Cash Box Top 100	21

=== Year-end charts ===
Chart (1980)	Rank
Canada	45
US (Joel Whitburn's Pop Annual)	122

== Certifications ==
Region	Certification	Certified units/sales
United States (RIAA)	Gold	500,000^{‡}
^{‡} Sales+streaming figures based on certification alone.

== Personnel ==
- Billy Joel – lead and backing vocals, acoustic piano, Yamaha electric grand piano
- David Brown – acoustic guitar
- Russell Javors – acoustic guitar
- Doug Stegmeyer – bass
- Liberty DeVitto – maracas, bass drum, triangle, claves, ratchet, castanets

== See also ==
- List of number-one adult contemporary singles of 1980 (U.S.)
