= Leyna Weber =

American actress

- Born: Leyna Juliet Weber; Long Island, New York
- Occupation(s): Actress, voice actress
- Years active: 1999–present

Leyna Juliet Weber is an American actress, author and screenwriter.

== Filmography ==
Year	Title	Role	Notes
2002	Law & Order	Wife	1 episode
2002	GetAway	Beth	Short film
2002	Grand Theft Auto: Vice City	Amy Sheckenhausen	Videogame
2003	Midnight Club II	Gina	Videogame
2003	Kenny the Shark	Additional Voices	26 episodes
2004	Law & Order: Special Victims Unit	Bartender Molly	1 episode
2005	Six Feet Under	Dee Dee	1 episode
2007	The Other Woman	Susan	Short film
2007	The Line	Nurse	Short film
2008	Taboo	Whitney	Short film
2008	Speeding Ticket	Mandy	Short film
2009	The Passenger		Short film
2009	The Veiled	Kelly Hightower	Short film
2009	Road to the Altar	Rochelle Shapiro	
2011	Enlightened	Mrs. Manning	1 episode

=== Documentary narration ===
Assignment Discovery (15 episodes)

- Cracking the Ocean Code (1 January 2006)
- Discovering Language Arts: A Novel Idea (1 January 2007)
- Discovering Language Arts: Right Before Your Eyes (1 January 2007)
- Ice Age: Extreme Climate (1 January 2007)
- Discovering Language Arts: The Write Stuff (1 January 2007)
- American History: A Nation Is Born (1 January 2007)
- Exploring the Tales of Hans Christian Andersen (1 January 2007)
- Statistics and Data Analysis in Sports (1 January 2007)
- American History: Rise of the 20th Century (1 January 2007)
- Discovering Language Arts: The Moral of the Story (1 January 2007)
- Discovering Language Arts: We Proudly Present (1 January 2007)
- Elements of Physics: Wave Phenomena (1 January 2007)
- Hans Christian Andersen and the Elements of a Story (1 January 2007)
- American History: Marching Into the Future (1 January 2007)
- Natural Disasters (1 January 2007)
