= All for Leyna =

1980 single by Billy Joel

Single by Billy Joel

from the album Glass Houses
- B-side: "Close to the Borderline"
- Released: March 1980 (UK)
- Genre: Punk rock; post-punk; new wave; arena rock
- Length: 4:15
- Label: Columbia
- Songwriter: Billy Joel
- Producer: Phil Ramone

Billy Joel singles chronology
"Until the Night" (1979)	"All for Leyna" (1980)	"You May Be Right" (1980)

"All for Leyna" is a song by Billy Joel from the 1980 album Glass Houses. The song was released as a single in the United Kingdom, where it reached #40 on the UK Singles Chart.

The lyrics tell the story of the protagonist who meets a girl named Leyna, and, after a one-night stand, becomes obsessed with her. A performance music video was made featuring Joel and his band in the studio. The video prominently features Joel playing a Yamaha CP-80 electric grand piano and an Oberheim OB-X synthesizer.

== Versions and covers ==
The video version differs from the album version. The track from the music video is the same but a new vocal was recorded.

In 1981 Jaak Joala covered the song in Estonian with his band Radar, under the title "Kõik Leyna jaoks (Sulle, Leyna)". The lyrics were translated by Heldur Karmo.

The band Gods of Mount Olympus covered the song in their single "Visitor".

In 2024, recording artists Mirage Box released a version of the song on their Tracks in the Sand double-CD.

== Chart positions ==
Chart (1980)	Peak position
Spain (AFYVE)	16
UK Singles (OCC)	40
UK Airplay (Record Business)	6
