= The Complete Hits Collection: 1973–1997 =

Greatest hits album by Billy Joel
- Released: October 13, 1997
- Recorded: 1973–1997
- Genres: Rock; interview
- Length: 4:28:15
- Label: Columbia
- Producer: Billy Joel

Billy Joel chronology
| Greatest Hits Volume III (1997) | The Complete Hits Collection: 1973–1997 (1997) | 2000 Years: The Millennium Concert (2000) |

Professional ratings
Review scores
| Source | Rating |
|---|---|
| Uncut | 4/5 stars |

The Complete Hits Collection: 1973–1997 is a 4-disc greatest hits album by American musician Billy Joel. It was released on October 14, 1997, a boxed set was released that included all three Greatest Hits volumes as well as a fourth disc (entitled An Evening of Questions & Answers... & A Little Music) that contains live tracks and a Q&A with Joel. Originally available in a long box format, the box set is also available in a compact box format.

== Track listing ==
All tracks are written by Billy Joel, except where noted.

Greatest Hits I (1985)
| No. | Title | Original album | Length |
|---|---|---|---|
| 1. | "Piano Man" | Piano Man, 1973 | 5:37 |
| 2. | "Captain Jack" | Piano Man | 6:57 |
| 3. | "The Entertainer" | Streetlife Serenade, 1974 | 3:40 |
| 4. | "Say Goodbye to Hollywood" | Turnstiles, 1976 | 4:39 |
| 5. | "New York State of Mind" | Turnstiles | 6:05 |
| 6. | "The Stranger" | The Stranger, 1977 | 5:10 |
| 7. | "Scenes from an Italian Restaurant" | The Stranger | 7:36 |
| 8. | "Just the Way You Are" | The Stranger | 4:51 |
| 9. | "Movin' Out (Anthony's Song)" | The Stranger | 3:30 |
| 10. | "Only the Good Die Young" | The Stranger | 3:55 |
| 11. | "She's Always a Woman" | The Stranger | 3:20 |
| Total length: | | | 55:20 |

Greatest Hits II (1985)
| No. | Title | Original album | Length |
|---|---|---|---|
| 1. | "My Life" | 52nd Street, 1978 | 4:43 |
| 2. | "Big Shot" | 52nd Street | 4:02 |
| 3. | "You May Be Right" | Glass Houses, 1980 | 4:12 |
| 4. | "It's Still Rock and Roll to Me" | Glass Houses | 2:58 |
| 5. | "Don't Ask Me Why" | Glass Houses | 2:59 |
| 6. | "She's Got a Way" (Live version) | Songs in the Attic, 1981; originally from Cold Spring Harbor, 1971 | 3:03 |
| 7. | " Pressure" | The Nylon Curtain, 1982 | 4:37 |
| 8. | " AllenTown" | The Nylon Curtain | 3:49 |
| 9. | "Goodnight Saigon" | The Nylon Curtain | 7:02 |
| 10. | "Tell Her About It" | An Innocent Man, 1983 | 3:50 |
| 11. | "Uptown Girl" | An Innocent Man | 3:16 |
| 12. | "The Longest Time" | An Innocent Man | 3:39 |
| 13. | "You're Only Human (Second Wind)" | Previously unreleased | 4:49 |
| 14. | "The Night Is Still Young" | Previously unreleased | 5:26 |
| Total length: | | | 58:25 |

Greatest Hits Volume III (1997)
| No. | Title | Original album | Length |
|---|---|---|---|
| 1. | "Keeping the Faith" | An Innocent Man, 1983 | 4:38 |
| 2. | "An Innocent Man" | An Innocent Man | 5:19 |
| 3. | "A Matter of Trust" | The Bridge, 1986 | 4:12 |
| 4. | "Baby Grand" (Duet with Ray Charles) | The Bridge | 4:05 |
| 5. | "This Is the Time" | The Bridge | 5:00 |
| 6. | "Leningrad" | Storm Front, 1989 | 4:04 |
| 7. | "We Didn't Start the Fire" | Storm Front | 4:48 |
| 8. | "I Go to Extremes" | Storm Front | 4:24 |
| 9. | "And So It Goes" | Storm Front | 3:38 |
| 10. | "The Downeaster 'Alexa'" | Storm Front | 3:44 |
| 11. | "Shameless" | Storm Front | 4:27 |
| 12. | "All About Soul" (Remix) | Exclusive to the "All About Soul" single, 1993; originally from River of Dreams, 1993 | 6:01 |
| 13. | "Lullabye (Goodnight, My Angel)" | River of Dreams | 3:35 |
| 14. | "The River of Dreams" | River of Dreams | 4:11 |
| 15. | "To Make You Feel My Love" (Bob Dylan) | Previously unreleased | 3:53 |
| 16. | "Hey Girl" (Gerry Goffin, Carole King) | Previously unreleased | 3:57 |
| 17. | "Light as the Breeze" (Leonard Cohen) | Tower of Song, 1995 | 6:12 |
| Total length: | | | 76:08 |

An Evening of Questions & Answers... & A Little Music
| No. | Title | Length |
|---|---|---|
| 1. | "Billy Joel Spoken Intro/Music Concepts" (Live and mostly spoken) | 10:18 |
| 2. | "Scenes from an Italian Restaurant" (Unreleased live version) | 7:50 |
| 3. | "Beatles Influence" (Live and mostly spoken) | 5:18 |
| 4. | "A Hard Day's Night" (Lennon–McCartney) (Unreleased live version) | 2:53 |
| 5. | "Why Vienna?" (Live and mostly spoken) | 9:28 |
| 6. | "Vienna" (Unreleased live version) | 3:41 |
| 7. | "History Through the Music" (Live and mostly spoken) | 4:31 |
| 8. | "We Didn't Start the Fire" (Unreleased live version) | 5:13 |
| 9. | "Music Source" (Live and mostly spoken) | 9:14 |
| 10. | "The River of Dreams" (Unreleased original studio recording) | 5:20 |
| 11. | "Piano Bar" (Live and mostly spoken) | 7:46 |
| 12. | "Piano Man" (Unreleased live version) | 6:31 |
| Total length: | | 78:03 |

== Personnel ==
- Remastering - Joseph Palmaccio (CD 1 and CD 2), Ted Jensen (CD 3 and CD 4) at Sterling Sound

== Certifications and sales ==
| Region | Certification | Certified units/sales |
|---|---|---|
| United States (RIAA) | Platinum | 1,000,000^{‡} |
^{‡} Sales+streaming figures based on certification alone.
