= The Last Play at Shea =

- Film poster
- Directed by: Paul Crowder
- Written by: Mark Monroe
- Produced by: Steve Cohen; Nigel Sinclair
- Narrated by: Alec Baldwin
- Cinematography: Roderick A. Santiano
- Edited by: Paul Crowder; Mike J. Nichols
- Production companies: Spitfire Pictures; Maritime Pictures
- Distributed by: Newmarket Films; Wrekin Hill Entertainment
- Release dates: April 26, 2010 (Tribeca); October 21, 2010 (United States)
- Running time: 90 minutes
- Country: United States
- Language: English

The Last Play at Shea is a 2010 American documentary film written by Mark Monroe, directed by Paul Crowder, produced by Steve Cohen and Nigel Sinclair, in conjunction with Billy Joel's Maritime Pictures and Spitfire Films. The film is centered on Billy Joel's 2008 concerts of the same name that occurred at Shea Stadium. The shows were staged on July 16 and 18, 2008, before a combined 110,000 fans, and were the last performances ever to play the historic stadium before it was demolished. The film debuted at the Tribeca Film Festival on April 26, 2010. The film was released on DVD on February 8, 2011. The CD and DVD from the show were released on March 8, 2011, by Sony.

The film premiered on August 21, 2010, at Citi Field, Shea Stadium's successor, in front of around 20,000 moviegoers. Earlier that day, Joel watched it himself, and there was an announcement from him that he liked it and said: "I haven't puked from it," which was shown right before the film's premiere.

== Synopsis ==
The 90-minute film uses historical footage and animation. It uses the concerts to tell a broader story of Shea Stadium's history and how that related to changes that occurred in American suburban life and how they affected Long Island and Billy Joel. The film reveals several previously unknown facts.

Pete Flynn was a Shea groundskeeper who did the improbable by driving the Beatles from the stage to a centerfield gate in 1965, and then driving Paul McCartney from the stadium's rear entrance to the stage to perform at Billy Joel's "Last Play at Shea" concert 43 years later in 2008.

== Musicians ==
- Billy Joel – piano, harmonica, vocals
- Tony Bennett – vocals – "New York State of Mind"
- Garth Brooks – vocals – "Shameless"
- Roger Daltrey – vocals – "My Generation"
- John Mayer – guitar – "This Is the Time"
- Paul McCartney – bass, vocals – "I Saw Her Standing There"; piano, vocals on "Let It Be"
- John Mellencamp – "Pink Houses"
- Steven Tyler – vocals – "Walk This Way"

== Songs ==
1. "Prelude/Angry Young Man"
2. "My Life"
3. "Summer, Highland Falls"
4. "Everybody Loves You Now"
5. "Zanzibar"
6. "New York State of Mind" (with Tony Bennett)
7. "Allentown"
8. "The Ballad of Billy the Kid"
9. "She's Always a Woman"
10. "Goodnight Saigon"
11. "Miami 2017 (Seen the Lights Go Out on Broadway)"
12. "Shameless" (with Garth Brooks)
13. "This Is the Time" (with John Mayer)
14. "Keeping the Faith"
15. "Captain Jack"
16. "Lullabye (Goodnight, My Angel)"
17. "The River of Dreams"/"A Hard Day's Night"
18. "We Didn't Start the Fire"
19. "You May Be Right"
20. "Scenes from an Italian Restaurant"
21. "Only the Good Die Young"
22. "I Saw Her Standing There" (with Paul McCartney)
23. "Take Me Out to the Ballgame"
24. "Piano Man"
25. "Let It Be" (with Paul McCartney)
