= Greatest Hits – Volume I & Volume II =

Greatest hits album by Billy Joel
- Released: August 2, 1985
- Recorded: 1973–1985
- Genre: Rock
- Length: 87:12 (LP/Cassette); 1:53:45 (CD); 1:57:38 (2017)
- Label: Family Productions/Columbia
- Producers: Michael Stewart, Billy Joel, Phil Ramone

Billy Joel chronology
An Innocent Man (1983)	Greatest Hits – Volume I & Volume II (1985)	The Bridge (1986)

Singles from Greatest Hits – Volume I & Volume II
- 1. "You're Only Human (Second Wind)" Released: July 1985; 2. "The Night Is Still Young" Released: September 1985

Professional ratings
Review scores
Source	Rating
AllMusic	4.5/5 stars
Christgau's Record Guide: The '80s	A−

Greatest Hits – Volume I & Volume II is the first greatest hits album by American singer-songwriter Billy Joel, released on August 2, 1985. The album has been certified double diamond by the RIAA, selling over 11.5 million copies (23 million units) and ranking as the sixth-most-certified platinum album of all time in the US. The compilation of recordings between 1973 and 1985 includes two previously unreleased tracks, "You're Only Human (Second Wind)" and "The Night Is Still Young". The two songs were released as singles and would later reappear on subsequent box sets.

The chronological compilation was later extended in 1997 by Greatest Hits Volume III.

== Track listing ==
All tracks are written by Billy Joel.

=== Double LP ===
Side one
No.	Title	Original album	Length
1.	"Piano Man"	Piano Man, 1973	5:36
2.	"Say Goodbye to Hollywood" (Live edited version)	Songs in the Attic, 1981; originally from Turnstiles, 1976	3:54
3.	"New York State of Mind"	Turnstiles	6:02
4.	"The Stranger"	The Stranger, 1977	5:07
5.	"Just the Way You Are" (Radio edit)	The Stranger	3:36

Side two
No.	Title	Original album	Length
1.	"Movin' Out (Anthony's Song)"	The Stranger	3:28
2.	"Only the Good Die Young"	The Stranger	3:53
3.	"She's Always a Woman"	The Stranger	3:17
4.	"My Life" (Radio edit)	52nd Street, 1978	3:51
5.	"Big Shot" (Radio edit)	52nd Street	3:43
6.	"You May Be Right"	Glass Houses, 1980	4:09

Side three
No.	Title	Original album	Length
1.	"It's Still Rock and Roll to Me"	Glass Houses	2:54
2.	"Don't Ask Me Why"	Glass Houses	2:57
3.	"Pressure" (Radio edit)	The Nylon Curtain, 1982	3:15
4.	"Allentown"	The Nylon Curtain	3:48
5.	"Goodnight Saigon"	The Nylon Curtain	7:00

Side four
No.	Title	Original album	Length
1.	"Tell Her About It" (Radio edit)	An Innocent Man, 1983	3:35
2.	"Uptown Girl"	An Innocent Man	3:15
3.	"The Longest Time"	An Innocent Man	3:36
4.	"You're Only Human (Second Wind)"	Previously unreleased	4:48
5.	"The Night Is Still Young"	Previously unreleased	5:28

Some original pressings omit "Don't Ask Me Why" and place "Honesty" after "Big Shot", pushing "You May Be Right" to the beginning of side three. Some foreign pressings also include "Honesty" in place of "Don't Ask Me Why".

=== Cassette ===
Side one
No.	Title	Original album	Length
1.	"Piano Man"	Piano Man, 1973	5:36
2.	"Say Goodbye to Hollywood" (Live edited version)	Songs in the Attic, 1981; originally from Turnstiles, 1976	3:54
3.	"New York State of Mind"	Turnstiles	6:02
4.	"The Stranger"	The Stranger, 1977	5:07
5.	"Just the Way You Are" (Radio edit)	The Stranger	3:36
6.	"Movin' Out (Anthony's Song)"	The Stranger	3:28
7.	"Only the Good Die Young"	The Stranger	3:53
8.	"She's Always a Woman"	The Stranger	3:17
9.	"My Life" (Radio edit)	52nd Street, 1978	3:51
10.	"Big Shot" (Radio edit)	52nd Street	3:43

Side two
No.	Title	Original album	Length
1.	"You May Be Right"	Glass Houses, 1980	4:09
2.	"It's Still Rock and Roll to Me"	Glass Houses	2:54
3.	"Don't Ask Me Why"	Glass Houses	2:57
4.	"Pressure" (Radio edit)	The Nylon Curtain, 1982	3:15
5.	"Allentown"	The Nylon Curtain	3:48
6.	"Goodnight Saigon"	The Nylon Curtain	7:00
7.	"Tell Her About It" (Radio edit)	An Innocent Man, 1983	3:35
8.	"Uptown Girl"	An Innocent Man	3:15
9.	"The Longest Time"	An Innocent Man	3:36
10.	"You're Only Human (Second Wind)"	Previously unreleased	4:48
11.	"The Night Is Still Young"	Previously unreleased	5:28

=== Double CD release ===
Disc one
No.	Title	Original album	Length
1.	"Piano Man"	Piano Man	5:36
2.	"Captain Jack"	Piano Man	7:15
3.	"The Entertainer"	Streetlife Serenade, 1974	3:38
4.	"Say Goodbye to Hollywood" (Live edited version)	Songs in the Attic; originally from Turnstiles	3:54
5.	"New York State of Mind"	Turnstiles	6:02
6.	"The Stranger"	The Stranger	5:07
7.	"Scenes from an Italian Restaurant"	The Stranger	7:33
8.	"Just the Way You Are" (Radio edit)	The Stranger	3:36
9.	"Movin' Out (Anthony's Song)"	The Stranger	3:28
10.	"Only the Good Die Young"	The Stranger	3:53
11.	"She's Always a Woman"	The Stranger	3:17
Total length:			53:19

Disc two
No.	Title	Original album	Length
1.	"My Life" (Radio edit)	52nd Street	3:51
2.	"Big Shot" (Radio edit)	52nd Street	3:43
3.	"You May Be Right"	Glass Houses	4:09
4.	"It's Still Rock and Roll to Me"	Glass Houses	2:54
5.	"Don't Ask Me Why"	Glass Houses	2:57
6.	"She's Got a Way" (Live version)	Songs in the Attic; originally from Cold Spring Harbor, 1971	3:00
7.	"Pressure" (Radio edit)	The Nylon Curtain	3:15
8.	"Allentown"	The Nylon Curtain	3:48
9.	"Goodnight Saigon"	The Nylon Curtain	7:00
10.	"Tell Her About It" (Radio edit)	An Innocent Man	3:35
11.	"Uptown Girl"	An Innocent Man	3:15
12.	"The Longest Time"	An Innocent Man	3:36
13.	"You're Only Human (Second Wind)"	Previously unreleased	4:48
14.	"The Night Is Still Young"	Previously unreleased	5:28
Total length:			55:19

=== 2017 release ===
No.	Title	Original album	Length
1.	"Piano Man"	Piano Man	5:37
2.	"Captain Jack"	Piano Man	6:57
3.	"The Entertainer"	Streetlife Serenade	3:40
4.	"Say Goodbye to Hollywood"	Turnstiles	4:39
5.	"New York State of Mind"	Turnstiles	6:05
6.	"The Stranger"	The Stranger	5:10
7.	"Scenes from an Italian Restaurant"	The Stranger	7:36
8.	"Just the Way You Are"	The Stranger	4:51
9.	"Movin' Out (Anthony's Song)"	The Stranger	3:30
10.	"Only the Good Die Young"	The Stranger	3:55
11.	"She's Always a Woman"	The Stranger	3:20
12.	"My Life"	52nd Street	4:43
13.	"Big Shot"	52nd Street	4:02
14.	"Honesty"	52nd Street	3:53
15.	"You May Be Right"	Glass Houses	4:12
16.	"It's Still Rock and Roll to Me"	Glass Houses	2:58
17.	"Don't Ask Me Why"	Glass Houses	2:59
18.	"She's Got a Way" (Live version)	Songs in the Attic; originally from Cold Spring Harbor	3:03
19.	"Pressure"	The Nylon Curtain	4:37
20.	"Allentown"	The Nylon Curtain	3:49
21.	"Goodnight Saigon"	The Nylon Curtain	7:02
22.	"Tell Her About It"	An Innocent Man	3:50
23.	"Uptown Girl"	An Innocent Man	3:16
24.	"The Longest Time"	An Innocent Man	3:39
25.	"You're Only Human (Second Wind)"	Previously unreleased	4:49
26.	"The Night Is Still Young"	Previously unreleased	5:26

While Phil Woods performed the sax solo for "Just the Way You Are", he did not rerecord the "New York State of Mind" sax solo for the Greatest Hits release. According to One Final Serenade, the saxophone solo on the *Greatest Hits* version was newly recorded by Michael Brecker.

In 1998, the two CD set was digitally remastered and packaged with two bonus videos ("You're Only Human (Second Wind)" and "The Night Is Still Young") on disc 1. All of the songs that were edited in the 1985 package ("Pressure", "My Life", "Big Shot", "Just the Way You Are" and "Tell Her About It") were restored to their original album lengths. Also, the live version of "Say Goodbye to Hollywood" was removed and replaced with the studio version from Joel's 1976 album Turnstiles. Surprisingly, "Captain Jack" has been shortened instead, fading out about 20 seconds sooner (6:56 instead of 7:15).

== Charts ==
=== Weekly charts ===
1985 weekly chart performance for Greatest Hits – Volume I & Volume II
Chart (1985)	Peak position
Australian Albums (Kent Music Report)	2
Austrian Albums (Ö3 Austria)	30
Canada Top Albums/CDs (RPM)	15
Dutch Albums (Album Top 100)	7
European Albums (Eurotipsheet)	21
Finnish Albums (Suomen virallinen lista)	28
German Albums (Offizielle Top 100)	33
Japanese Albums (Oricon)	4
New Zealand Albums (RMNZ)	1
Norwegian Albums (VG-lista)	18
Swedish Albums (Sverigetopplistan)	45
UK Albums (Official Charts)	7
US Billboard 200	6

2025 weekly chart performance for Greatest Hits – Volume I & Volume II
Chart (2025)	Peak position
Canadian Albums (Billboard)	51

=== Year-end charts ===
1985 year-end performance for Greatest Hits – Volume I & Volume II
Chart (1985)	Position
Australian Albums (Kent Music Report)	13
Canada Top Albums/CDs (RPM)	36
Dutch Albums (Album Top 100)	55
New Zealand Albums (RMNZ)	10
US Billboard 200	90

1986 year-end performance for Greatest Hits – Volume I & Volume II
Chart (1986)	Position
New Zealand Albums (RMNZ)	47

== Certifications and sales ==
Region	Certification	Certified units/sales
Australia (ARIA)	9× Platinum	630,000^{‡}
Austria (IFPI Austria)	Gold	25,000^{*}
Canada (Music Canada)	2× Platinum	200,000^{^}
France (SNEP)	2× Gold	200,000^{*}
Japan (RIAJ) Original release	3× Platinum	600,000^{^}
Japan (RIAJ) 2003 re-release	Gold	100,000^{^}
Netherlands (NVPI)	Gold	50,000^{^}
New Zealand (RMNZ)	Gold	7,500^{‡}
Norway (IFPI Norway)	Gold	25,000^{*}
United Kingdom (BPI)	Platinum	300,000^{^}
United States (RIAA)	23× Platinum	11,500,000^{^}
Summaries
Worldwide	—	18,000,000
^{*} Sales figures based on certification alone.^{^} Shipments figures based on certification alone.^{‡} Sales+streaming figures based on certification alone.
