= Kohuept =

1987 live album by Billy Joel

Live album by Billy Joel
- Released: October 26, 1987
- Recorded: July–August 1987
- Venues: Olympic Stadium, Moscow, Russian SFSR, Soviet Union; V. I. Lenin Sport & Concert Complex, Leningrad, Russian SFSR, Soviet Union
- Genres: Rock; hard rock; new wave
- Length: 72:52
- Label: Columbia
- Producers: Jim Boyer; Brian Ruggles

Billy Joel chronology
The Bridge (1986)	Kohuept (1987)	Storm Front (1989)

Billy Joel live chronology
Songs in the Attic (1981)	Kohuept (1987)	2000 Years: The Millennium Concert (2000)

Kontsert; Russian: Концерт, [kɐnˈt͡sɛrt]; (commonly read as Kohuept or Kohliept, English: Concert), released in 1987, is the second live album by Billy Joel. The album was recorded during the Soviet leg of Joel's 1987 The Bridge tour. This album was co-produced by Jim Boyer and Brian Ruggles and mixed by Jim Boyer. It was rereleased in 2014 with extra tracks as A Matter of Trust: The Bridge to Russia.

== Background ==
In 1986 Billy Joel was invited to perform in the Soviet Union the following year, 1987. Joel took advantage of this opportunity to be a musical ambassador. He was seen as a "nice, safe, first attempt at bringing in an American 'pop star'".

== The concert ==
The tour of the Soviet Union consisted of six shows: three in Moscow and three in Leningrad. Joel brought his family with him to show the Russians that he felt safe and trusted the Russian people. During the show Joel gave new meanings to songs such as "Honesty". Each time the song was performed, he dedicated the song to Vladimir Vysotsky, because he was an inspirational Russian man who "spoke the truth".

During the second of the three concerts performed in Moscow at the Olympic Sports Complex, Joel flipped his electric piano and broke his microphone stand on his grand piano. While performing "Sometimes a Fantasy", the audience kept getting attention from spotlights, which angered Joel, as he felt that it was making it harder to connect with them because crowd members on whom lights shone would suddenly become silent and still. He yelled: "Stop lighting the audience! Let me do my show, for Christ's sake!" He then trashed his instruments, overturning his piano and breaking his mic stand; neither he nor the band stopped performing despite this. He later claimed that "People like their privacy. They go to a concert to get that, to be in the dark and do their own thing."

Joel brought his daughter Alexa Ray Joel and his wife Christie Brinkley on tour with the band. He also crowd-surfed during his performances. While in Leningrad, Billy dove into the crowd during the performance of "The Longest Time". This was another way for him to show that he trusted the Russian people.

Professional ratings
Review scores
Source	Rating
AllMusic	1.5/5 stars
Rolling Stone Album Guide, 3rd Edition	3/5 stars

Joel had played a tour in Europe prior to the tour in the Soviet Union and was being interviewed during the day. As a result, his voice became hoarse. Joel himself stated that he was disappointed by the album and believed that his vocals were not up to par during its production. Despite his opinion, Columbia Records released the album, claiming that it was a "historic event". Joel and his band jokingly refer to the album as Kaput.

== Impact ==
Joel and his band were one of the first Western rock groups to perform in Russia, along with John Denver, Elton John, James Taylor, and Santana.

While in Russia, Billy Joel and his daughter Alexa met and became friends with a clown named Viktor. The song "Leningrad" would eventually be written about him. This song was released on the 1989 Storm Front album.

Joel went on to say:

The trip to Russia was probably the biggest highlight for me as a performer. I met these people and they weren't the enemy. I also hoped that the people in America could see what we did. What happens when your kid says to you "what did you do in the Cold War, Daddy?" And now we have something to say.

== Track listing ==
All tracks are written by Billy Joel, except where noted. Joel's cover of the Beatles' "Back in the U.S.S.R." became the first single released by him that was written by someone other than himself. The B-side was "The Times They Are A-Changin'", Joel's live cover of Bob Dylan's song. Sides 1–4 are tracks 1–16 on CD.

Side one
No.	Title	Writer(s)	Length
1.	"Odoya" (Performed by Zhournalist)	Traditional	1:17
2.	"Prelude/Angry Young Man"		5:24
3.	"Honesty"		3:58
4.	"Goodnight Saigon"		7:21

Side two
No.	Title	Length
5.	"Stiletto"	5:09
6.	"Big Man on Mulberry Street"	7:17
7.	"Baby Grand"	6:09

Side three
No.	Title	Length
1.	"An Innocent Man"	6:09
2.	"Allentown"	4:23
3.	"A Matter of Trust"	5:08
4.	"Only the Good Die Young"	3:33

Side four
No.	Title	Writer(s)	Length
5.	"Sometimes a Fantasy"		3:38
6.	"Uptown Girl"		3:09
7.	"Big Shot"		4:44
8.	"Back in the U.S.S.R."	Lennon–McCartney	2:45
9.	"The Times They Are A-Changin'"	Bob Dylan	2:58
Total length:			72:58

== A Matter of Trust: The Bridge to Russia ==
A Matter of Trust: The Bridge to Russia

Video by Billy Joel
- Released: 19 May 2014
- Recorded: July–August 1987
- Genre: Pop rock
- Label: Legacy Records

Professional ratings
Review scores
Source	Rating
AllMusic	3/5 stars
Modern Drummer	(positive)
PopMatters	9/10 stars
Theseconddisc.com	(positive)
TimeOut	4/5 stars

On May 19, 2014, the album was re-released and retitled as A Matter of Trust: The Bridge to Russia, a two-CD, one-DVD/Blu-ray set incorporating eleven previously unreleased tracks on CD and seven previously unreleased and restored songs on video. In addition, the DVD/Blu-ray set contains a newly produced documentary of the same name which features updated interviews with Joel's current and former band members as well as personnel involved with the original 1987 production. "Superfans are likely to drool over the deluxe edition which includes a book with accounts from writers and journalists who were on the road with Joel during the tour", Charles Pitter at PopMatters wrote.

=== Track listing ===
All songs written by Billy Joel, except where noted.

Disc one

1. "Odoya" (Traditional Georgian) – 1:16
2. "Prelude/Angry Young Man" – 5:33
3. "Honesty" – 5:15
4. "The Ballad of Billy the Kid" – 5:32
5. "She's Always a Woman" – 3:35
6. "Scenes from an Italian Restaurant" – 8:21
7. "Goodnight Saigon" – 6:37
8. "Stiletto" – 5:10
9. "Big Man on Mulberry Street" – 7:29
10. "Baby Grand" – 6:14
11. "What's Your Name" – 2:17
12. "The Longest Time" – 5:11
13. "An Innocent Man" – 6:04

Disc two

1. "Pressure" – 5:23
2. "Allentown" – 3:52
3. "A Matter of Trust" – 5:10
4. "Only the Good Die Young" – 3:32
5. "It's Still Rock and Roll to Me" – 4:00
6. "Sometimes a Fantasy" – 3:38
7. "You May Be Right" – 5:35
8. "Uptown Girl" – 3:09
9. "Big Shot" – 4:54
10. "Back in the U.S.S.R." (Lennon/McCartney) – 2:55
11. "The Times They Are A-Changin'" (Dylan) – 2:38
12. "She Loves You" (Lennon/McCartney) (Russian concerts rehearsal recording) – 2:24
13. "New York State of Mind" (Russian concerts rehearsal recording) – 6:22
14. "Piano Man" (Russian concerts rehearsal recording) – 4:25

==== DVD/Blu-ray ====
1. "Prelude/Angry Young Man"
2. "Allentown"
3. "Goodnight Saigon"
4. "Big Man on Mulberry Street"
5. "Baby Grand"
6. "An Innocent Man"
7. "Honesty"
8. "The Longest Time"
9. "A Matter of Trust"
10. "Only the Good Die Young"
11. "It's Still Rock and Roll to Me"
12. "Sometimes a Fantasy"
13. "You May Be Right"
14. "Uptown Girl"
15. "Big Shot"
16. "Back in the U.S.S.R."

Bonus song:

1. "Pressure"

== Personnel ==
=== Musicians ===
- Billy Joel – vocals, keyboards, guitar (10, 16), harmonica
- Dave Lebolt – keyboards
- Mark Rivera – saxophone, lyricon, keyboards, tambourine, backing vocals
- Kevin Dukes – guitar
- Russell Javors – acoustic and electric guitars, harmonica, backing vocals
- Doug Stegmeyer – bass, electric upright bass
- Liberty DeVitto – drums, maracas, Simmons drums
- Peter Hewlett – backing vocals, percussion
- George Simms – backing vocals, percussion
- The Georgian Rustavi Ensemble of USSR – vocals (1)
- Oleg Smirnoff – on-stage translation

=== Technical ===
- Produced by Jim Boyer and Brian Ruggles
- Executive producers – Frank Weber and Rick London
- Album coordinator – Laura Boyer
- Recorded by Jim Boyer
- Additional recording – Bradshaw Leigh (1, 15, 16)
- Mixed by Jim Boyer, Brian Ruggles, and Bradshaw Leigh
- Associate engineer – Tim Leitner
- Mastered by Ted Jensen at Sterling Sound (New York, NY)
- Art direction – Stacy Drummond
- Photography – Neal Preston
- Crew – Nick Reynolds, Michelle Reynolds, Andy Rose
- Technical support – Lee Lambert and Andy Hilton (Hilton Sound)

== Charts ==
Chart (1987/88)	Peak position
Australia (Kent Music Report)	10
Dutch Albums (MegaCharts)	39
Japanese Albums (Oricon)	16
New Zealand Albums (RIANZ)	13
UK Albums (OCC)	92
US Billboard 200	38

=== Certifications ===
Region	Certification	Certified units/sales
New Zealand (RMNZ)	Gold	7,500^{^}
United States (RIAA)	Platinum	1,000,000^{^}
^{^} Shipments figures based on certification alone.

== See also ==
- Снова в СССР, Paul McCartney album originally released in 1988 exclusively in the Soviet Union
