= 2000 Years: The Millennium Concert =

Live album by Billy Joel
- Released: May 2, 2000
- Recorded: December 31, 1999 – January 1, 2000
- Venues: Madison Square Garden, New York City
- Genre: Rock
- Length: 128:39
- Label: Sony
- Producer: Don DeVitto

Billy Joel chronology
Greatest Hits Volume III (1997)	2000 Years: The Millennium Concert (2000)	The Ultimate Collection (2001)

Billy Joel live chronology
Kohuept (1987)	2000 Years: The Millennium Concert (2000)	12 Gardens Live (2006)

Professional ratings
Review scores
Source	Rating
AllMusic	2.5/5 stars
Rolling Stone	3/5 stars

2000 Years: The Millennium Concert is a two-disc set and the third live album by Billy Joel, released in 2000. On May 31, 2000, it was certified Gold by the RIAA for sales of 250,000 copies.

The album was recorded on New Year's Eve 1999 at Madison Square Garden in New York City, during Joel's The Night of Two Thousand Years Tour. Some alterations were made before its release: some songs are not the same version featured in the original concert (like "Big Shot"), others were edited in studio.

2000 Years: The Millennium Concert also marked the first time several songs had to be transposed to lower keys to accommodate Joel's deepening voice. "Only the Good Die Young" (C to B), "Goodnight Saigon" (C to B), "I Go To Extremes" (C to B), and "The River of Dreams" (G to F#) are a semitone lower. "New York State of Mind" (C to Bb), "I've Loved These Days" (C to Bb), and "This Night" (A to G) are a tone lower. "2000 Years" is a tone and a half lower (F to D).

== Track listing ==
All songs written by Billy Joel, except where noted.

Disc one

1. "Beethoven's Ninth Symphony" (Ludwig van Beethoven) – 1:43
2. "Big Shot" – 4:55
3. "Movin' Out (Anthony's Song)" – 5:23
4. "Summer, Highland Falls" – 5:29
5. "The Ballad of Billy the Kid" – 6:52
6. "Don't Ask Me Why" – 4:49
7. "New York State of Mind" – 8:29
8. "I've Loved These Days" – 4:30
9. "My Life" – 5:47
10. "Allentown" (Includes an excerpt from the Allegro of Beethoven's Piano Concerto No. 5, "The Emperor" ) – 4:48
11. "Prelude/Angry Young Man" – 5:23
12. "Only the Good Die Young" – 3:49

Disc two

1. "I Go to Extremes" – 5:01
2. "Goodnight Saigon" – 7:28
3. "We Didn't Start the Fire" – 5:21
4. "Big Man on Mulberry Street" – 5:29
5. "2000 Years" – 6:02
6. "Auld Lang Syne" (Burns/Traditional) – 1:44
7. "The River of Dreams" (Includes a bridge from "Land of a Thousand Dances" written by Chris Kenner) – 5:54
8. "Scenes from an Italian Restaurant" – 8:05
9. "Dance to the Music" (Sly Stone) – 3:17
10. "Honky Tonk Women" (Mick Jagger/Keith Richards) – 3:17
11. "It's Still Rock & Roll to Me" – 4:08
12. "You May Be Right" – 6:07
13. "This Night" (Ludwig van Beethoven/Billy Joel) – 4:49

Some editions include a bonus track:

"This Is the Time" (live) European release: Columbia 497981 2

"This Is the Time" (live) and "Just The Way You Are" Japanese release: Sony SRCS 2267-8, which also included a 48-page booklet.

Several songs were performed in the concert but not included on the CD:

- "Pressure" and "Just the Way You Are" were performed in between "Don't Ask Me Why" and "New York State of Mind."
- "This is the Time" was performed in between "My Life" and "Allentown."
- "Uptown Girl" was performed in between "Prelude/Angry Young Man" and "Only the Good Die Young" (transposed from the key of E to D).
- "Miami 2017 (I've Seen the Lights Go Out on Broadway)" and "And So it Goes" were performed in between "Big Man on Mulberry Street" and "2000 Years."
- A cover of The Jimi Hendrix Experience's "Purple Haze" was performed in between "The River of Dreams" and "Scenes from an Italian Restaurant."
- Covers of Led Zeppelin's "Good Times Bad Times" and Mark James' "Suspicious Minds" were performed in between covers of Sly and the Family Stone's "Dance to the Music" and The Rolling Stones' "Honky Tonk Women."
- After "This Night," "Souvenir" and "Piano Man" were performed to conclude the concert. "Souvenir" was transposed from the key of E flat to D and "Piano Man" from C to B.

== Personnel ==
- Billy Joel – lead vocals, keyboards, rhythm electric guitar on "We Didn't Start the Fire", harmonica on "Piano Man"
- David Rosenthal – keyboards, backing vocals
- Mark Rivera – keyboards, guitars, saxophones, flute, backing vocals
- Tommy Byrnes – guitars, backing vocals
- Crystal Taliefero – guitars, percussion, saxophone, Occasional harmonica. backing vocals
- David Santos – bass
- Liberty DeVitto – drums
- Richie Cannata – alto saxophone, soprano saxophone, tenor saxophone
- Ozzie Melendez – trombone
- Barry Danielian – trumpet
- The Philadelphia Orchestra – orchestra (1)
- Eugene Ormandy – conductor (1)
- Mormon Tabernacle Choir – choir (1)
- Melodie Crittenden – backing vocals
- Kim Keyes – backing vocals
- Curtis King – backing vocals
- Michael Mellett – backing vocals
- Marlon Saunders – backing vocals
- Arif St. Michael – backing vocals
- Biti Strauchn – backing vocals

== Charts ==
Charts for 2000 Years: The Millennium Concert
Chart (2000)	Peak position
German Albums (Offizielle Top 100)	64
Japanese Albums (Oricon)	17
Scottish Albums (Official Charts)	54
UK Albums (Official Charts)	68
UK Physical Albums (OCC)	68
US Billboard 200	40

== Certifications and sales ==
Certifications and sales for 2000 Years: The Millennium Concert
Region	Certification	Certified units/sales
Japan	—	75,000
United States (RIAA)	Gold	250,000^{^}
^{^} Shipments figures based on certification alone.
