= The Hits (Billy Joel album) =

Billy Joel – The Hits

Greatest hits album by Billy Joel
- Released: November 16, 2010
- Genres: Pop, rock
- Length: 79:34
- Label: Columbia
- Producer: Various

Billy Joel chronology
The Essential 3.0 (2008)	Billy Joel – The Hits (2010)	She's Got a Way: Love Songs (2010)

Professional ratings
Review scores
Source	Rating
AllMusic	4.5/5 stars

Billy Joel – The Hits is a greatest hits album by American singer-songwriter Billy Joel, released on November 16, 2010, in the United States only. It is his first single-disc compilation released in the US. It leaves off some of Joel's most successful songs, such as "Just the Way You Are", "She's Always a Woman" and "Uptown Girl", in favor of lesser known tracks, such as "Everybody Loves You Now".

== Track listing ==
All tracks are written by Billy Joel.

No.	Title	Original album	Length
1.	"Everybody Loves You Now"	Cold Spring Harbor, 1971	2:49
2.	"Piano Man"	Piano Man, 1973	5:39
3.	"The Entertainer"	Streetlife Serenade, 1974	3:40
4.	"New York State of Mind"	Turnstiles, 1976	6:02
5.	"Movin' Out (Anthony's Song)"	The Stranger, 1977	3:29
6.	"Only the Good Die Young"	The Stranger	3:55
7.	"My Life"	52nd Street, 1978	4:42
8.	"Big Shot"	52nd Street	4:02
9.	"You May Be Right"	Glass Houses, 1980	4:13
10.	"It's Still Rock and Roll to Me"	Glass Houses	2:57
11.	"Say Goodbye to Hollywood" (Live)	Songs in the Attic, 1981; originally from Turnstiles	4:25
12.	"Allentown"	The Nylon Curtain, 1982	3:50
13.	"Pressure"	The Nylon Curtain	4:40
14.	"The Longest Time"	An Innocent Man, 1983	3:39
15.	"Tell Her About It"	An Innocent Man	3:50
16.	"A Matter of Trust"	The Bridge, 1986	4:09
17.	"We Didn't Start the Fire"	Storm Front, 1989	4:51
18.	"I Go to Extremes"	Storm Front	4:23
19.	"The River of Dreams"	River of Dreams, 1993	4:05

== Charts ==
Weekly chart performance for The Hits
Chart (2011)	Peak position
US Billboard 200	34

== Certifications ==
Region	Certification	Certified units/sales
United States (RIAA)	Gold	500,000^{‡}
^{‡} Sales+streaming figures based on certification alone.
