= My Lives =

Box set by Billy Joel
- Released: November 22, 2005
- Recorded: 1965–2001
- Genres: Rock; pop; classical; psychedelic rock; rock and roll
- Length: 284:50 (4-CD); 85 Minutes (DVD)
- Label: Columbia/SBMG

Billy Joel chronology
Piano Man: The Very Best of Billy Joel (2004)	My Lives (2005)	12 Gardens Live (2006)

Professional ratings
Review scores
Source	Rating
Allmusic	3.5/5 stars

My Lives is a box set compilation of demos, outtakes, B-sides, soundtrack cuts, live recordings and album cuts by American singer-songwriter Billy Joel. It was released on November 22, 2005. The album name is derivative of the Billy Joel song "My Life". The liner notes were written by longtime Rolling Stone magazine contributor Anthony DeCurtis.

The 4-CD set is notable for including numerous tracks that were previously released but had never been available on an official Billy Joel album, including songs from his days with the Lost Souls, the Hassles, and Attila; various B-sides; and soundtrack contributions such as "Why Should I Worry?" which his character sang in the Disney animated film Oliver & Company. A bonus DVD is also included featuring live performances from River of Dreams Tour.

The cover of the boxed set was painted by Joel's daughter, Alexa Ray Joel, when she was seven years old.

== Release ==
It was Joel's 20th album to chart on the Billboard 200, peaking at No. 171 in December 2005.

In a 2018 interview, Joel seemed to indicate the boxed set was compiled and released without his consent, stating that "it was unfinished stuff that never should have been heard. I didn’t want anything to do with it. I refer to that album as Twigs and Stems and Seeds — you’re not supposed to smoke that shit."

== Track listing ==
There are five discs included in My Lives: four CDs and one DVD. All songs written by Billy Joel, except where noted.

=== Disc one ===
1. "My Journey's End" – The Lost Souls (never-released demo) – 2:07
2. "Time and Time Again" – The Lost Souls (never-released demo) – 2:00
3. "Every Step I Take (Every Move I Make)" – the Hassles (album version) (William Joel, T. Michaels, V. Gorman) – 2:28
4. "You've Got Me Hummin'" – The Hassles (album version) (Isaac Hayes, David Porter) – 2:28
5. "Amplifier Fire (Part 1) Godzilla" (truncated from original, also includes portion of Part 2 (Revenge of the Huns))– Attila (Joel, Jonathan Small) – 3:06
6. "Only a Man" (never-released demo) – 3:16
7. "She's Got a Way" (Cold Spring Harbor album studio version) – 2:56
8. "Oyster Bay" (never-released demo) – 3:44
9. "Piano Man" (never-released demo) – 2:52
10. "The Siegfried Line" (never-released demo) – 2:35
11. "New Mexico" (never-released demo) (became "Worse Comes to Worst") – 2:37
12. "Cross to Bear" (never-released demo) – 4:20
13. "Miami 2017 (Seen the Lights Go Out on Broadway)" (never-released demo) – 4:50
14. "These Rhinestone Days" (never-released demo) (became "I've Loved These Days") – 3:00
15. "Everybody Has a Dream" (album version; does not end with the instrumental reprise of the whistled theme from "The Stranger") – 4:36
16. "Only the Good Die Young" (never-released alternate reggae version) – 3:39
17. "Until the Night" (album version) – 6:38
18. "Zanzibar" (album version; longer trumpet solo) – 6:47
19. "It's Still Rock and Roll to Me" (album version) – 2:58

=== Disc two ===
1. "Captain Jack" (never-released live version) – 7:22
2. "The End of the World" (never-released demo) (became "Elvis Presley Blvd.") – 3:22
3. "The Prime of Your Life" (never-released demo) (became "The Longest Time") – 3:43
4. "She's Right on Time" (album version) – 4:14
5. "Elvis Presley Blvd." (B-side of "Allentown") – 3:15
6. "Nobody Knows But Me" (from In Harmony II) – 2:55
7. "An Innocent Man" (album version) – 5:19
8. "Christie Lee" (never-released demo) – 4:02
9. "Easy Money" (album version) – 4:06
10. "And So It Goes" (never-released demo) – 3:14
11. "I'll Cry Instead" (live, B-side of "An Innocent Man" (John Lennon, Paul McCartney) – 2:25
12. "Keeping the Faith" – 4:54 (incorrectly listed as the 12" remix, which originally ran for 5:27; this is actually the 7" remix)
13. "Modern Woman" (album version) – 3:51
14. "Baby Grand" (duet with Ray Charles) (album version) – 4:05
15. "Getting Closer" (duet with Steve Winwood) (never-released alternate version) – 5:39
16. "House of Blue Light" (B-side of "We Didn't Start the Fire"; this version of the song contains a harmonica that is not heard in the original, meaning this is technically a redub) – 4:45
17. "Money or Love" (never-released demo) – 4:02
18. "The Times They Are A-Changin'" (live album version) (Bob Dylan) – 2:54

=== Disc three ===
1. "The Downeaster 'Alexa'" (album version) – 3:45
2. "I Go to Extremes" (live, April 1990 LA Sports Coliseum, never released) – 4:53
3. "Shout" (live) (O'Kelly Isley, Ronald Isley, Rudolph Isley) – 5:50
4. "All Shook Up" (Honeymoon in Vegas soundtrack) (Otis Blackwell, Elvis Presley) – 2:09
5. "Heartbreak Hotel" (Honeymoon in Vegas soundtrack) (Mae Boren Axton, Tommy Durden, Elvis Presley) – 3:21
6. "When You Wish Upon a Star" (Simply Mad About the Mouse: A Musical Celebration of Imagination soundtrack) (Leigh Harline, Ned Washington) – 3:42
7. "In a Sentimental Mood" (A League of Their Own soundtrack) (Duke Ellington, Manny Kurtz, Irving Mills) – 4:02
8. "Motorcycle Song" (never-released demo) (Became "All About Soul") – 4:19
9. "You Picked a Real Bad Time" (B-side of "All About Soul") – 4:56
10. "The River of Dreams" (never-released alternate version) (features a melodic bridge from "Lullabye (Goodnight, My Angel)") – 5:49
11. "A Hard Day's Night" (live) (Lennon, McCartney) – 2:47
12. "Light as the Breeze" (album version) (Leonard Cohen) – 6:14
13. "To Make You Feel My Love" (album version) (Dylan) – 3:52
14. "Hey Girl" (album version) (Gerry Goffin, Carole King) – 3:57
15. "Why Should I Worry" (Oliver & Company soundtrack) (Dan Hartman, Charlie Midnight) – 3:33
16. "Where Were You (On Our Wedding Day?)" (Runaway Bride soundtrack) (Harold Logan, John Patton, Lloyd Price) – 1:58
17. "Highway 61 Revisited" (never-released demo) (Dylan) – 5:11

=== Disc four ===
1. "Movin' Out (Anthony's Song)" (live) – 3:44
2. "You May Be Right" (duet with Elton John) (live, July 1994 Giants Stadium and never released) – 4:50
3. "Big Shot" (live) incorrectly listed from The Essential Video Collection) – 4:45
4. "Don't Worry Baby" (live from An All-Star Tribute to Brian Wilson) (Roger Christian, Brian Wilson) – 3:27
5. "Goodnight Saigon" – Vietnam Veterans Version (live) – 6:30
6. "Los Angelenos" (live 1980 from The Essential Video Collection) – 3:54
7. "New York State of Mind" (live from America: A Tribute to Heroes) – 6:01
8. "Opus 1. Soliloquy (On a Separation)" – 11:22
9. "Opus 8. Suite for Piano (Star-Crossed) I. Innamorato" – 7:46
10. "Opus 8. Suite for Piano (Star-Crossed) II. Sorbetto" – 1:31
11. "Opus 8. Suite for Piano (Star-Crossed) III. Delusion" – 3:35
12. "Elegy: The Great Peconic" (performed by London Symphony Orchestra, from Music of Hope) – 6:51
13. "Glass Houses Promo Talk" (appears as an untitled track on the album) – 9:00
- Note: Two tracks ("Josephine [Demo]" and "So Long, Reverend Ike") are available for download and streaming as bonus tracks.

=== Disc five (DVD) ===
Live from the River of Dreams Tour:

1. "No Man's Land"
2. "Pressure"
3. "The Ballad of Billy the Kid"
4. "Leningrad"
5. "Allentown"
6. "My Life"
7. "I Go to Extremes"
8. "Shades of Grey"
9. "The River of Dreams"
10. "Goodnight Saigon"
11. "We Didn't Start the Fire"
12. "A Hard Day's Night"
13. "Big Shot"
14. "Piano Man"
15. "I Go to Extremes" – "Umixit" Track
16. "Zanzibar" – "Umixit" Track

A bonus 4-track "Umixit" DVD was included exclusively for Best Buy and contains the following songs:

1. "Keeping the Faith" album version - "Umixit" track (Best Buy exclusive)
2. "Movin' Out" (Live) - "Umixit" track (Best Buy exclusive)
3. "Big Shot" (Live) - "Umixit" track (Best Buy exclusive)
4. "Only the Good Die Young" album version - "Umixit" track (Best Buy exclusive)
