= Live at Shea Stadium: The Concert =

Live album by Billy Joel
- Released: March 8, 2011
- Recorded: July 16 & 18, 2008
- Venue: Shea Stadium (New York City)
- Genre: Rock
- Length: 128:24
- Label: Columbia
- Producers: Jon Small; Steve Cohen

Billy Joel chronology
| She's Always a Woman: Love Songs (2010) | Live at Shea Stadium: The Concert (2011) | Billy Joel: The Complete Albums Collection (2011) |

Billy Joel live chronology
| 12 Gardens Live (2006) | Live at Shea Stadium: The Concert (2013) | Live at Carnegie Hall (2019) |

Live at Shea Stadium: The Concert is the fifth live album as well as a CD and DVD music compilation of songs performed by American singer/songwriter Billy Joel during two concerts at Shea Stadium in New York City on July 16 and 18, 2008. It was released on March 8, 2011. The documentary film, released as The Last Play at Shea on October 21, 2010, was produced by Jon Small, Joel's former bandmate in the 1960s groups The Hassles and Attila. The film premiered at the Tribeca Film Festival, and aired on PBS as part of Great Performances.

The two concerts were the last performed at Shea Stadium before it was demolished to make way for Citi Field. It features guest appearances by Tony Bennett, Garth Brooks, John Mayer, Steven Tyler, Roger Daltrey, John Mellencamp, Mark Wood, and Paul McCartney.

== Track listing ==
All songs written by Billy Joel except "Take Me Out to the Ball Game" (Jack Norworth and Albert Von Tilzer), and "Let It Be" "A Hard Day’s Night" and "I Saw Her Standing There" (Lennon–McCartney).

=== Disc one ===
1. "Prelude/Angry Young Man" – 5:45
2. "My Life" – 5:30*
3. "Movin' Out" – 3:45
4. "The Entertainer" – 4:06
5. "Summer, Highland Falls" – 3:42
6. "Everybody Loves You Now" – 3:05
7. "Zanzibar" – 5:36
8. "New York State of Mind" (with Tony Bennett) – 6:49
9. "Allentown" – 3:51
10. "The Ballad of Billy the Kid" – 5:41
11. "She's Always a Woman" – 3:45
12. "Goodnight Saigon" – 7:23
13. "Miami 2017 (Seen the Lights Go Out on Broadway)" – 4:20
14. "Shameless" (with Garth Brooks) – 4:54
15. "This Is the Time" (with John Mayer) – 6:16
16. "Keeping the Faith" – 5:06
- The CD version of "My Life" has an alternative introduction ("Yankee Doodle Dandy") from the DVD.

=== Disc two ===
1. "Captain Jack" – 7:20
2. "Lullabye (Goodnight, My Angel)" – 3:43
3. "The River Of Dreams"/"A Hard Day’s Night" – 7:43
4. "We Didn't Start the Fire" – 5:14
5. "You May Be Right" – 4:53
6. "Scenes from an Italian Restaurant" – 7:40
7. "Only The Good Die Young" – 4:13
8. "I Saw Her Standing There" (with Sir Paul McCartney) – 4:06
9. "Take Me Out to the Ball Game" – 0:45
10. "Piano Man" – 5:53
11. "Let It Be" (with Sir Paul McCartney) – 5:11

=== DVD ===
1. "Prelude/Angry Young Man"
2. "My Life"
3. "Movin Out"
4. "The Entertainer"
5. "Summer, Highland Falls"
6. "Everybody Loves You Now"
7. "Zanzibar"
8. "New York State of Mind" (with Tony Bennett)
9. "Allentown"
10. "The Ballad of Billy the Kid"
11. "She's Always a Woman"
12. "Goodnight Saigon"
13. "Miami 2017 (Seen the Lights Go Out on Broadway)"
14. "Shameless" (with Garth Brooks)
15. "This Is the Time" (with John Mayer)
16. "Keeping the Faith"
17. "Captain Jack"
18. "Lullabye (Goodnight, My Angel)"
19. "The River of Dreams"/"A Hard Day's Night"
20. "We Didn't Start the Fire"
21. "You May Be Right"
22. "Scenes from an Italian Restaurant"
23. "Only the Good Die Young"
24. "I Saw Her Standing There" (with Sir Paul McCartney)
25. "Take Me Out to the Ball Game"
26. "Piano Man"
27. "Let It Be" (with Sir Paul McCartney)

In addition to the above, the DVD of the concert offers three extra performances: "Walk This Way" with Steven Tyler, "My Generation" with Roger Daltrey and "Pink Houses" with John Mellencamp.

== Credits ==
- Billy Joel – lead vocals, grand piano, keyboards, harmonica
- David Rosenthal – keyboards, grand piano, organ, backing vocals
- Tommy Byrnes – guitars, music director
- Mark Rivera – guitars, saxophone, flute, backing vocals
- Crystal Taliefero – guitars, percussion, saxophone, backing vocals
- Andy Cichon – bass, backing vocals
- Chuck Burgi – drums
- Carl Fischer – saxophones, trumpet

== Certifications ==
| Region | Certification | Certified units/sales |
|---|---|---|
| Australia (ARIA) | 2× Platinum | 30,000^{^} |
^{^} Shipments figures based on certification alone.
