= 12 Gardens Live =

Live album by Billy Joel
- Released: June 13, 2006
- Recorded: Madison Square Garden New York, NY
- Genre: Rock
- Length: 2:32:47
- Label: Columbia
- Producers: Steve Lillywhite; Billy Joel

Billy Joel chronology
My Lives (2005)	12 Gardens Live (2006)	Billy Joel – The Hits (2010)

Billy Joel live chronology
2000 Years: The Millennium Concert (2000)	12 Gardens Live (2006)	Live at Shea Stadium: The Concert (2008)

Professional ratings
Review scores
Source	Rating
Allmusic	4/5 stars

12 Gardens Live is the fourth live album by American singer/songwriter Billy Joel, recorded during a former record run of 12 sold-out concerts at Madison Square Garden in New York City in early 2006. It was released on June 13, 2006.

Although some of the singer's best known hits are on the album, several are transposed into a lower key to accommodate Joel's maturing vocal range. This is also the first time Joel's signature song "Piano Man" has appeared on a live CD.

== Track listing ==
All songs written by Billy Joel.

=== Disc one ===
1. "Prelude/Angry Young Man" – 5:21 †
2. "My Life" – 4:59 †
3. "Everybody Loves You Now" – 3:04 †
4. "The Ballad of Billy the Kid" – 5:30 †
5. "The Entertainer" – 4:01 †
6. "Vienna" – 3:35 †
7. "New York State of Mind" – 7:05 †
8. "The Night Is Still Young" – 5:13
9. "Zanzibar" – 5:57 †
10. "Miami 2017 (Seen the Lights Go Out on Broadway)" – 5:03 †
11. "The Great Wall of China" – 5:07 †
12. "Allentown" – 3:51 †
13. "She's Right On Time" – 3:56 †
14. "Don't Ask Me Why" – 3:10
15. "Laura" – 5:19 †
16. "A Room of Our Own" (hidden track) – 4:10 †

=== Disc two ===
1. "Goodnight Saigon" – 7:17 †
2. "Movin' Out (Anthony's Song)" – 3:48 †
3. "An Innocent Man" – 5:41 †
4. "The Downeaster "Alexa"" – 3:50 †
5. "She's Always a Woman" – 3:41 †
6. "Keeping the Faith" – 4:53 †
7. "The River of Dreams" – 5:21 †
8. "A Matter of Trust" – 4:39 †
9. "We Didn't Start the Fire" – 4:47
10. "Big Shot" – 4:23
11. "You May Be Right" – 4:49
12. "Only the Good Die Young" – 3:43 †
13. "Scenes from an Italian Restaurant" – 7:35
14. "Piano Man" – 5:43 †
15. "And So It Goes" – 3:50
16. "It's Still Rock and Roll to Me" (hidden track) – 3:26

† = performed in lower key than recorded studio version

In addition to the above, the iTunes Store offers two extra songs, "Stiletto" and "Honesty". Also for a short time, Sony Music Direct was offering direct downloads of "You're My Home" and "Sleeping with the Television On" as an incentive to purchase the CD from Sony Music's website.

== Personnel ==
- Billy Joel – lead vocals, grand piano, keyboards, harmonica
- David Rosenthal – keyboards, grand piano, organ, backing vocals
- Mark Rivera – keyboards, guitars, saxophone, flute, backing vocals
- Tommy Byrnes – guitars, music director
- Crystal Taliefero – guitars, percussion, saxophone, backing vocals
- Andy Cichon – bass, backing vocals
- Chuck Burgi – drums
- Richie Cannata – saxophones
- Carl Fischer – trombone, trumpet

== Charts ==
Chart (2006)	Position
Australian Albums (ARIA)	22
Austrian Albums (Ö3 Austria Top 40)	11
German Albums (Offizielle Top 100)	80
Japanese Albums (Oricon)	52
UK Albums (OCC)	95
