= Miami 2017 (Seen the Lights Go Out on Broadway) =

Song by Billy Joel

from the album Turnstiles
- Released: May 1976
- Studio: Ultra Sonic Studio in Hempstead, New York, U.S.
- Genre: Progressive rock
- Length: 5:12
- Label: Columbia
- Songwriter: Billy Joel
- Producer: Billy Joel

"Miami 2017 (Seen the Lights Go Out on Broadway)" is a song written and originally recorded by Billy Joel which appeared as the final song on his 1976 album Turnstiles. Several live performances of the song have been released. He has performed this song at a number of benefit concerts, including The Concert for New York City for victims of the September 11 attacks in 2001, as well as on the television program Hurricane Sandy: Coming Together for Hurricane Sandy victims in 2012 and during his set at 12-12-12: The Concert for Sandy Relief. Joel has often tweaked the lyrics to the song at his live concerts, particularly at the Live at Shea and Coming Together concerts. On New Year's Eve 2016, Joel performed at the BB&T Center in Sunrise, Florida, a city just north of Miami Dade County. At midnight, he crooned the traditional "Auld Lang Syne" and then immediately went into "Miami 2017".

== Background and story ==
The release of Turnstiles followed Billy Joel's return to his hometown of New York City from a brief foray in Los Angeles which resulted in the albums Piano Man and Streetlife Serenade. Several of the songs are linked to this transition, including "Say Goodbye to Hollywood" and "New York State of Mind".

Joel has described it as a "science fiction song" about an apocalypse occurring in New York as a result of discussions that the city was failing in the 1970s. Speaking at the University of Pennsylvania in 2001, Joel explained that he wrote the song while living in Los Angeles in 1975, when New York City was on the verge of default: New York was bordering on bankruptcy, and after asking the Federal government for help, they were denied assistance; this resulted in the famous October 1975 headline on the New York Daily News, "Ford to City: Drop Dead".

Joel stated that people in Los Angeles, including former New Yorkers, were deriding New York for its troubles. Joel says he thought, "If New York's going to go down the tubes, I'm going to go back to New York." He explains that the song depicts the apocalypse occurring in New York, "the skyline tumbling down, this horrendous conflagration happening in New York City." Joel stated that the song is titled "Miami 2017" because many New Yorkers retire to Miami, and the narrator is telling his grandchildren in the year 2017 about what he saw in the destruction of New York.

== Response ==
In a review of Songs in the Attic for Rolling Stone magazine, Timothy White wrote, "'Miami 2017 (Seen the Lights Go Out on Broadway),' from 1976's Turnstiles, is one chauvinistic New Yorker's reaction to the famous Daily News default-era headline ... and the composer's elaborate fantasy-farce about the apocalyptic destruction of the city is as take-it-or-leave-it defiant as the front page that inspired it."

When the New York radio station WNEW-FM dropped its rock music format (in favor of "hot talk") in 1999, disc jockey Carol Miller chose "Miami 2017" as one of her farewell songs (along with Jimi Hendrix's version of "The Star-Spangled Banner").

Reviewing Joel's 2010 compilation, The Hits, on which "Miami 2017" was not included, reviewer Mike Doyle wrote, "[U]nfortunately, [the album is] not necessarily representative of his best work. ... [M]issing are some of the songs that helped define Billy Joel as one of the most talented American songwriters, such as ... 'Miami 2017' ...."

== Significance after September 11, 2001 ==
Among the catastrophes that befall the city in the song is the destruction of its iconic skyscrapers. "I saw the Empire State laid low," the singer recalls, "I watched the mighty skyline fall". On September 11, 2001, planes hijacked by terrorists were crashed into the World Trade Center towers, the city's tallest buildings, causing them to collapse with a loss of almost 3,000 lives.

Shortly afterwards, Joel performed the song at a benefit concert on October 20, 2001. Joel announced at the end of the song, "I wrote that song 25 years ago. I thought it was going to be a science fiction song; I never thought it would really happen. But unlike the end of that song, we ain't going anywhere!" His statement was met with raucous applause.

Joel played the song at multiple benefit concerts again in 2012 after the destruction wrought on the Northeastern United States by Hurricane Sandy.

On New Year's Eve 2016 at the BB&T Center, Joel performed the tune as the clock struck midnight, thus finally singing the song in Miami in 2017.

In 2020, Joel performed the song for Rise Up New York!, a COVID-19 benefit telethon, while the lights of the Empire State Building synced with the song.

== Cover versions ==
"Miami 2017" was recorded by Richard Marx in 1993, and released as a bonus track on international versions of his album Paid Vacation.

The song appeared in the original Chicago production of the jukebox musical Movin' Out but was not included in the final version of the musical as performed on Broadway.

== Live performances ==
Nine live performances of the song are available:

| Album/DVD | Released | Performed | Venue | Notes |
|---|---|---|---|---|
| Songs in the Attic | 1981 | June 1980 | Madison Square Garden | Opening track |
| Billy Joel: Live at Yankee Stadium | 1990 | June 1990 | Yankee Stadium | |
| The Concert for New York City | 2001 | October 22, 2001 | Madison Square Garden | 9/11 benefit concert |
| 12 Gardens Live | 2006 | 2006 | Madison Square Garden | |
| Last Play at Shea - DVD and CD | 2008 | 2008 | Shea Stadium | Lyrics altered to refer to Shea Stadium and the New York Mets |
| The Stranger 30th Anniversary Edition | 2008 | June 1977 | Carnegie Hall | |
| The Stranger 30th Anniversary Edition DVD | 2008 | 1978 | BBC's The Old Grey Whistle Test | Aired only once on BBC 2 |
| 12-12-12: The Concert for Sandy Relief | 2012 | December 12, 2012 | Madison Square Garden | Hurricane Sandy benefit concert |
| Legendary FM Broadcasts - The Dome, C.W. Post College, NY | 2017 | May 1977 | C.W. Post College | |
| Billy Joel: Live at Carnegie Hall 1977 | 2019 | June 1977 | Carnegie Hall | |
