= The Hangover Part II: Original Motion Picture Soundtrack =

Soundtrack album by Various Artists
- Released: May 23, 2011
- Recorded: 2011
- Label: WaterTower Music

The Hangover Part II: Original Motion Picture Soundtrack is a soundtrack to the comedy film of the same name. It was released on May 23, 2011 by WaterTower Music.

== Development ==
WaterTower Music has announced the release of The Hangover Part II: The Original Motion Picture Soundtrack on May 24, 2011. The soundtrack contains 12 songs from the film, along with eight dialogue clips from the film. The Hangover Part II opened worldwide on May 26, 2011. Though the song "Monster", by Kanye West featuring Jay-Z, Rick Ross, Bon Iver and Nicki Minaj, was featured in the film, it does not appear on the soundtrack.

Among the songs included on the album is Ed Helms' version of the Billy Joel song "Allentown", rewritten in the spirit of his popular "Stu’s Song" from the soundtrack of 2009′s The Hangover. Also by Billy Joel is "The Downeaster Alexa". Additional new music includes a song from Danzig, along with music from the Ska Rangers, Kanye West, Mark Lanegan, Deadmau5, Wolfmother and more.

== Reception ==
The Hangover Part II: Original Motion Picture Soundtrack received a positive review from AllTimeSoundtrack.com:

There is nothing more romantic than to spend your rainy day in bed day dreaming or else, reminiscing. Yes, this is how the soundtrack of the movie makes you feel. Unlike other movie soundtrack, the track collections in The Hangover II are rarely new. In fact, most of them are those you just heard around but never attended.

There is just something so special in the collection that makes you want to check your rack and see the songs that you haven’t played for a while. But take note of some like Kanye West’s that lets you groove for the sake of having a break from being too sentimental.

A total track of smooth and hard rock journey is on your way.

== Track listing ==
Track listing
No.	Title	Artist(s)	Length
1.	"Black Hell"	Danzig	4:14
2.	"You Can't Just Skip Out of the Bachelor Party"	Bradley Cooper & Ed Helms	0:12
3.	"Stronger"	Kanye West, Daft Punk	5:11
4.	"Stu's First Marriage"	Bradley Cooper & Zach Galifianakis	0:10
5.	"The Downeaster Alexa"	Billy Joel	3:42
6.	"Holla, City of Squaller"	Bradley Cooper & Ken Jeong	0:10
7.	"The Beast in Me"	Mark Lanegan	2:45
8.	"What the Fuck Is Going On?!"	Ed Helms	0:06
9.	"Sofi Needs a Ladder"	deadmau5, Sofi	6:41
10.	"Allentown"	Ed Helms	1:24
11.	"Pusher Man"	Curtis Mayfield	4:59
12.	"Seriously, What Is Wrong with You Three?"	Sasha Barrese	0:06
13.	"Love Train"	Wolfmother	3:00
14.	"Farting Medication"	Bradley Cooper, Zach Galifianakis, Ed Helms, and Aroon Seeboonruang	0:13
15.	"I Ran"	Ska Rangers	4:11
16.	"When a Monkey Nibbles"	Zach Galifianakis	0:06
17.	"One Night in Bangkok"	Mike Tyson	3:25
18.	"Hold on, Gay Boys"	Ken Jeong	0:06
19.	"Just the Way You Are"	Ska Rangers	5:10
20.	"Bad Man's World"	Jenny Lewis	3:39

Other songs that appear in the film but not on the album:

- "Monster" by Kanye West ft. Jay-Z, Rick Ross, Nicki Minaj, and Bon Iver
- "Pretend" by Ken Peplowski
- "Smokestack Lightin'" by Howlin' Wolf
- "Imma Be" by The Black Eyed Peas
- "Time in a Bottle" by Jim Croce
- "Bangkok Days" by Emir Isilay
- "One Thousand Tears of a Tarantula" by Dengue Fever
- "Turn Around Part 2" by Flo Rida and Pitbull
