= I've Loved These Days =

Single by Billy Joel

from the album Turnstiles
- B-side: "Say Goodbye to Hollywood"
- Released: October 1976
- Length: 4:31 (album version); 3:40 (single version)
- Label: Columbia; Family Productions
- Songwriter: Billy Joel
- Producer: Billy Joel

Billy Joel singles chronology
"James" (1976)	"I've Loved These Days" (1976)	"Just the Way You Are" (1977)

"I've Loved These Days" is a song written and performed by Billy Joel from his fourth studio album Turnstiles (1976). It was released as the album's second and final single in the United States in October 1976, backed with "Say Goodbye to Hollywood". American Songwriter has described the song as "essentially one man's farewell to a lifestyle that is as alluring as it is unsustainable", while also drawing a connection between its theme and Joel's real-life move from Los Angeles to New York during the creation of the Turnstiles album. An early version of the song with different lyrics was called "These Rhinestone Days".

"I've Loved These Days" serves as the closing track on the live album Songs in the Attic (1981), while the "These Rhinestone Days" demo was included in the box set My Lives (2005).

== Lyrics and music ==
The lyrics of "I've Loved These Days" describe a couple that is living above their means and know that they need to stop but can't. They now spend their time drinking champagne and using cocaine to avoid facing their problems. Joel biographer Mark Bego notes that the couple soothe themselves with four "indulgences" that start with the letter "c": champagne, cocaine, cabernet and caviar.

The song is a ballad, which music culture professor Ken Bielen described as "a forerunner of the power ballads of the 1980s and 1990s." Bego described it as a "grandiose and metaphor-filled song, accompanied by strings and drums, as an ode to all the indulgences that money could buy. The instrumentation starts on the piano, but then synthesizer, strings and cymbals are added. Bielen claimed that "the manner in which the percussion is mixed is a precursor of the big drum sound of the 1980s."

== Reception ==
Rock journalist Lisa Torem said that "The inner rhymes and soaring melody uphold the tender lyric" and called the song "profound" despite being short. Torem particularly praised the drumming of Liberty DeVitto, saying that his "passion for the story is clearly evident in his laid-back performance – a true professional he can always be counted on to allow space for sensitive lyrics while keeping up the momentum."

Christopher Bonanos of Vulture ranked "I've Loved These Days" as Joel's 28th-best song, referring to it as "one of the better songs" from Turnstiles and stating his surprise at the song not being "more of a standard". Eagles drummer and vocalist Don Henley has listed the track as one of his ten favorite Billy Joel songs. Joel biographer Fred Schruers described it as being "at times as ethereal as an oboe solo."
