= Greatest Hits Volume III (Billy Joel album) =

Greatest hits album by Billy Joel
- Released: August 19, 1997
- Recorded: 1983–1997
- Genre: Rock
- Length: 76:08
- Label: Columbia
- Producers: Phil Ramone, Mick Jones, Billy Joel, Danny Kortchmar, Joe Nicolo, David Thoener

Billy Joel chronology
River of Dreams (1993)	Greatest Hits Volume III (1997)	The Complete Hits Collection: 1973–1997 (1997)

Singles from Greatest Hits Volume III
- 1. "To Make You Feel My Love" Released: August 13, 1997; 2. "Hey Girl" Released: October 10, 1997

Professional ratings
Review scores
Source	Rating
AllMusic	2.5/5 stars

Greatest Hits Volume III is the second greatest hits album from American singer songwriter Billy Joel. The volume follows Greatest Hits – Volume I & Volume II (1985) and includes hits from 1983 to 1993. Two previously unreleased studio tracks are included, Bob Dylan's "To Make You Feel My Love" and Goffin/King's "Hey Girl", while the third new track, "Light as the Breeze", was originally recorded for a Leonard Cohen tribute album known as Tower of Song: The Songs of Leonard Cohen in 1995. Cover songs are a rare occurrence in Joel's catalogue.

Joel's cover of "To Make You Feel My Love" came out two months before Bob Dylan released his own version for his 1997 album Time Out of Mind.

To help promote the album, Joel filmed music videos for both "To Make You Feel My Love" and "Hey Girl", featuring himself performing with his band. In addition, Joel performed "To Make You Feel My Love" as musical guest on The Late Show with David Letterman on August 18, 1997, almost exactly four years after Joel served as the first musical guest on Letterman's premiere show for CBS.

Commercially, the collection paled in comparison to the first two greatest hits volumes, only achieving platinum status.

Chronologically, Greatest Hits Volume III continues from where Volume II left off, as the first two tracks, "Keeping the Faith" and "An Innocent Man", first appeared on his album An Innocent Man.

== Track listing ==
All songs written by Billy Joel except where noted.

No.	Title	Original album	Length
1.	"Keeping the Faith"	An Innocent Man, 1983	4:38
2.	"An Innocent Man"	An Innocent Man	5:19
3.	"A Matter of Trust"	The Bridge, 1986	4:12
4.	"Baby Grand" (Duet with Ray Charles)	The Bridge	4:05
5.	"This Is the Time"	The Bridge	5:00
6.	"Leningrad"	Storm Front, 1989	4:04
7.	"We Didn't Start the Fire"	Storm Front	4:48
8.	"I Go to Extremes"	Storm Front	4:24
9.	"And So It Goes"	Storm Front	3:38
10.	"The Downeaster 'Alexa'"	Storm Front	3:44
11.	"Shameless"	Storm Front	4:27
12.	"All About Soul" (Remix)	Exclusive to the "All About Soul" single, 1993; originally from River of Dreams, 1993	6:01
13.	"Lullabye (Goodnight, My Angel)"	River of Dreams	3:35
14.	"The River of Dreams"	River of Dreams	4:11
15.	"To Make You Feel My Love" (Bob Dylan)	Previously unreleased	3:53
16.	"Hey Girl" (Gerry Goffin, Carole King)	Previously unreleased	3:57
17.	"Light as the Breeze" (Leonard Cohen)	Tower of Song, 1995	6:12

== Personnel ==
- Billy Joel – keyboards, acoustic piano, Hammond B-3, Fender Rhodes, synthesizers, clavinet, accordion, harpsichord, harmonica, electric guitar, lead and backing vocals
- Bob Bailey, Kim Fleming, Yvonne Hodges, Donna McElroy, Chris Rodriguez, Trisha Yearwood, Alex Brown, Jackie Gouche, Monalisa Young, Wrecia Ford, Marion Saunders, B. David Whitworth, Frank and George Simms, Patricia Darcy Jones, Frank Floyd, Mick Jones, Joe Lynn Turner, Ian Lloyd, Chuck Arnold (and members of the Hicksville High School Chorus) – background vocals
- Emory Gordy Jr., David Brown, Russell Javors, Dean Parks, Joey Hunting, Mike Tyler, Danny Kortchmar, Tommy Byrnes, Phillip Nowlam, Bob Mann, Dann Huff, Mac McAnally – guitars
- Paul Franklin – pedal steel ("Light as the Breeze")
- Matt Rollings, Ray Charles – acoustic piano
- Steve Nathan – organ
- Robbie Kondor, Randy Waldman – keyboards
- John Mahoney – keyboards, keyboard programming
- Kevin Jones – keyboard programming
- Jeff Jacobs, Jeff Bova – synthesizers
- Doug Stegmeyer, Neil Stubenhaus, Schuyler Deale, T. M. Stevens, Chuck Treece, Jeff Lee Johnson, Will Lee, Willie Weeks, Randy D. Jackson – bass guitar
- Liberty DeVitto, Vinnie Colaiuta, Zachary Alford, Shawn Pelton – drums
- Crystal Taliefero – percussion, backing vocals
- Mark Rivera – percussion, alto and tenor saxophones
- Everette Harp - tenor saxophone
- Michael Brecker – tenor sax
- Ronnie Cutler – baritone sax

== Certifications ==
Region	Certification	Certified units/sales
Australia (ARIA)	Gold	35,000^{^}
Canada (Music Canada)	Gold	50,000^{^}
Japan (RIAJ)	Gold	100,000
Netherlands (NVPI)	Platinum	100,000^{^}
United Kingdom (BPI)	Silver	60,000^{^}
United States (RIAA)	Platinum	1,000,000^{^}
^{^} Shipments figures based on certification alone.
