= Zanzibar (song) =

Song by Billy Joel

from the album 52nd Street
- Released: October 13, 1978
- Recorded: A&R Recording, Inc., 799 7th Avenue at 52nd Street, New York City; 1978
- Genre: Rock; pop rock; jazz fusion
- Length: 5:13
- Label: Columbia
- Songwriter: Billy Joel
- Producer: Phil Ramone

"Zanzibar" is a song written by Billy Joel and recorded for his 1978 album 52nd Street. It has also appeared on several live albums.

== Lyrics and music ==
The themes of "Zanzibar" include love of sports, love of alcohol and the singer's attempt to pick up a waitress. According to producer Phil Ramone, Joel had written the music and had decided he liked the title "Zanzibar" for the piece, but had not figured out what to say about Zanzibar. Hearing the music conjured up for Ramone images of people watching television in a bar, and as a result Joel decided to make the song about activity in a sports bar named Zanzibar rather than about the island Zanzibar. The lyrics include a number of contemporary sports references, including to heavyweight champion boxer Muhammad Ali, baseball player Pete Rose, and the baseball team the New York Yankees, who were the World Champions at the time. The lyrics also use a baseball expression as a sexual metaphor when the singer wants to steal second base with a waitress in the bar if the waitress will allow it. Joel biographer Hank Bordowitz considers the waitress to be a metaphor for Joel's first wife Elizabeth, similar to how he considers the waitress "practicing politics" in Joel's earlier song "Piano Man" to be a metaphor for Elizabeth.

The song begins with a short slow section, but then moves to a shuffle rhythm. It contains two jazz solos - the first on flugelhorn, the second on trumpet - played by the legendary jazz trumpeter Freddie Hubbard. The song's bridge begins with a "dreamy" keyboard section, which leads into the flugelhorn solo. According to Ramone, the urgency and sexiness of the flugelhorn part is enhanced by the ascending and descending line played on bass guitar beneath the solo. The second solo (trumpet) comes at the end of the song and goes into the fade out. Of playing with Hubbard, Joel stated that it "was a special treat for me, because I've always admired and respected jazz players." Joel also recalled that after playing with Hubbard on the song, drummer Liberty DeVitto claimed that "Now I feel like a grown up." Allmusic critic Stephen Thomas Erlewine considers the melody of "Zanzibar" to be an homage to Steely Dan's Donald Fagen.

== Reception ==
Ramone claims that he convinced Joel to experiment with creating a jazz mood on the 52nd Street album based on the fact that Joel had written some jazz riffs into the end of "Zanzibar". Billy Joel biographer Mark Bego claims that "If 52nd Street is Billy's tribute to jazz, then 'Zanzibar' is its centerpiece." "Zanzibar" was the third most played album cut from 52nd Street on U.S. album-oriented rock radio during 1979 according to the year-end R&R Top 79 Albums of 1979 chart.

== Other appearances ==
"Zanzibar" has often featured in Joel's live concerts. Since 2005 the trumpet solos have been performed by Carl Fischer. Live performances have been included on the 2006 album 12 Gardens Live and the 2008 album Live at Shea Stadium: The Concert. A live performance also appears in the video The Last Play at Shea. In later performances, Joel alters the lyrics about Pete Rose, reflecting his ban from baseball resulting from gambling allegations. Instead of singing of Rose being "a credit to the game", Joel jokes that he will "never make the Hall of Fame".

"Zanzibar" was also included on the compilation album My Lives. This version does not fade out the second trumpet solo that ends the song, providing an extra minute and a half of Hubbard's playing.

In January 2021, the song became popular on the short-form-video app TikTok after user @maxmith_ featured it alongside an original dance that became viral. As of February 27, 2021, the song has been featured in over 400,000 TikTok videos.
