= James (song) =

- European release picture sleeve

Single by Billy Joel

from the album Turnstiles
- B-side: "Summer, Highland Falls" (US); "Travelin' Prayer" (EU)
- Released: July 1976
- Recorded: 1975–1976
- Length: 3:56 (album version); 3:53 (single version)
- Label: Columbia; Family Productions
- Songwriter: Billy Joel
- Producer: Billy Joel

Billy Joel singles chronology
"Say Goodbye to Hollywood" (1976)	"James" (1976)	"I've Loved These Days" (1977)

Music video
- "James" on YouTube

"James" is a song written and performed by Billy Joel from his fourth studio album Turnstiles (1976). It was released as the album's first single in the United States in July 1976, backed with "Summer, Highland Falls".

"James" was later released on the live album Live at the Great American Music Hall 1975, placed as the 15th track on the album.

== Lyrics and music ==
The song describes a conversation between two friends who chose different paths in life. The lyrics are directed at a person named "James", a friend who has taken the traditional path by prioritising education and responsibility, while the narrator has pursued a less conventional path on the road.

The narrator expresses admiration for James' dedication and notes that he has "carried the weight of family pride" and "lived up to expectations." However, it also encourages James to live his authentic life, with the refrain "do what's good for you, or you're not good for anybody, James".

== Reception ==
Analog Planet described the song as "a cross between Paul McCartney and James Taylor", noting that the arrangement "perfectly fits the mood", and gave praise to the soprano sax solo and the electric piano, while also remarking that the song is "judgemental as hell".
