= Prelude/Angry Young Man =

Song by Billy Joel

from the album Turnstiles
- Released: 1976
- Studio: Ultra Sonic Studio, Hempstead, New York
- Genre: Progressive rock, pop
- Length: 5:17
- Label: Columbia
- Songwriter: Billy Joel
- Producer: Billy Joel

Prelude/Angry Young Man is a song by the American singer-songwriter Billy Joel, released in 1976 as a track on his fourth album Turnstiles. Joel wrote and produced the song himself, recording it with his band at Ultra Sonic Studios in Hempstead, New York. Although never issued as a single, it became one of Joel's most popular fan favorites and a staple of his live concerts.

Live versions of the song appear on several concert albums, including Kohuept (1987), 2000 Years: The Millennium Concert (2000), and 12 Gardens Live (2006). A version was also included on Live at Shea Stadium: The Concert (2011). The song was also featured in the Broadway musical Movin' Out (2002).

== Composition and structure ==
"Prelude/Angry Young Man" is divided into two sections. The first, "Prelude", is a high-speed instrumental introduction lasting approximately 1 minute and 43 seconds. Joel performs a rapid-fire piano riff intended to emulate the iconic drum pattern from the Surfaris' 1963 surf hit "Wipe Out".

The "Prelude" transitions through several musical styles including Aaron Copland-style Americana, funk, and a Western shuffle. This leads into the vocal section, "Angry Young Man", which maintains an upbeat tempo and syncopated phrasing. The arrangement features drums, electric guitar, and harmonica, building to a reprise of the opening piano figure.

== Lyrics and themes ==
Lyrically, "Angry Young Man" satirizes a self-righteous, idealistic youth who, in his unrelenting struggle for causes, becomes increasingly isolated. The narrator juxtaposes this youthful indignation with a more resigned adult viewpoint, suggesting either that he once was the angry young man or has known many like him:

"He refuses to bend, he refuses to crawl / And he's always at home with his back to the wall..."

"I believe I've passed the age of consciousness and righteous rage / I found that just surviving was a noble fight..."

The tone of the song is often interpreted as cynical or critical. Some critics, such as Robert Christgau, found the song's stance to be "obnoxious" and symptomatic of Joel's "anti-idealism". Others view it as a self-aware reflection on the disillusionment of growing older.

== Live performances ==
"Prelude/Angry Young Man" has become a hallmark of Joel's live shows. According to Joel, the opening moments of a concert are when his hands are at their freshest and his energy is at its peak, which is essential for executing the prelude passage. Attempting it later in the show, after the physical demands of other songs, would risk compromising the accuracy and momentum required.

During his 2006 12-night residency at Madison Square Garden, he opened every show with the piece.

Joel often adapts live renditions by extending the introduction or emphasizing lyrical elements. In his 1999 New Year's Eve concert at Madison Square Garden, he included a 40-second solo piano improvisation before beginning the piece.

== Legacy and media appearances ==
Beyond its place in Joel's discography, the instrumental "Prelude" has been used in various media. It served as the theme for the German television talk show Live (1988–96) and for Grampian Television's program Summer at Six in the early 1980s. It is also commonly played during stoppages at New York Knicks home games at Madison Square Garden.

The song was featured in the musical Movin' Out, where its instrumental and lyrical elements underscored scenes of frustration and post-war disillusionment.

== In Rock Band ==
"Prelude/Angry Young Man" was released as downloadable content for the Rock Band 3 platform on March 22, 2011. It was part of the "Billy Joel Piano Challenge" song pack and includes support for Pro Guitar, Pro Bass, and Pro Keyboard modes.
