= Big Man on Mulberry Street =

Song by Billy Joel

from the album The Bridge
- Released: July 1986
- Recorded: Power Station (New York, New York)
- Genre: Jazz
- Length: 5:26
- Label: Columbia
- Songwriter: Billy Joel
- Producer: Phil Ramone

"Big Man on Mulberry Street" is a song by Billy Joel from the 1986 album The Bridge. The jazz-influenced song's title refers to Mulberry Street in the Little Italy section of New York City.

== Other versions ==
An extended version of the song, with an added horn solo, was used in the November 18, 1986, episode of the ABC series Moonlighting that was also titled "Big Man on Mulberry Street." In a dream sequence choreographed by Stanley Donen that doubles as a dialogue-free dance number, Maddie Hayes (Cybill Shepherd) envisions the romantic history of her business partner, David Addison (Bruce Willis), and his ex-wife (Sandahl Bergman). Billy Joel was a Moonlighting fan and on his own initiative approached the show's producers and offered the song.

An extended version is also played during Joel's 1987 concert in Leningrad, and during the outro, Joel introduces the band; this can be heard on the live album Kohuept. Another live version was included on the album 2000 Years: The Millennium Concert.

== Personnel ==
- Billy Joel – lead vocals, acoustic piano
- David Brown – guitar
- Russell Javors – guitar
- Liberty DeVitto – drums
- Doug Stegmeyer – bass guitar

Additional personnel

- Ron Carter – acoustic bass
- Eddie Daniels – alto saxophone
- Michael Brecker – tenor saxophone
- Ronnie Cuber – baritone saxophone
- Marvin Stamm – trumpets
- Alan Rubin – trumpets
- Dave Bargeron – trombone
