= Baby Grand =

Single by Billy Joel and Ray Charles

from the album The Bridge
- B-side: "Big Man on Mulberry Street"
- Released: March 1987
- Recorded: 1986
- Genre: Blues, soft rock
- Length: 4:00
- Label: Columbia
- Songwriter: Billy Joel
- Producer: Phil Ramone

Billy Joel singles chronology
| "This Is the Time" (1986) | "Baby Grand" (1987) | "We Didn't Start the Fire" (1989) |

Ray Charles singles chronology
| "The Pages of My Mind" (1986) | "Baby Grand" (1986) | "I Can See Clearly Now" (1988) |

"Baby Grand" is the fourth and final single released off Billy Joel's album The Bridge. A duet with Joel and Ray Charles, the song is a ballad dedicated to the baby grand piano, and the relationship it can share with its players. The two originally got together when Joel contacted Charles about the naming of his daughter, Alexa Ray, after Charles. Charles then suggested they create a song together.

Joel originally sang the song in his thick New York accent, but decided to do a Charles impression instead when he noticed Charles was trying to imitate his style. The song was positively received by critics. The single peaked at No. 75 on the U.S. Billboard Hot 100 and at No. 3 on the Adult Contemporary chart. The music video features Joel and Charles recording the vocal tracks together.

== Personnel ==
- Billy Joel - lead vocal, piano (left-channel)
- Ray Charles - lead vocal, piano (right-channel)
- Dean Parks - guitar
- Neil Stubenhaus - bass guitar
- Vinnie Colaiuta - drums
- Patrick Williams - arrangements

== Writing and recording ==
Production of the song began in early 1986 in Los Angeles. Joel considered Ray Charles one of his idols. "Ray Charles was my hero when I was growing up," Joel recalled. "As big of a pianist or as big of a star I could ever become, I could never be Ray Charles." According to Joel, when Charles heard that Joel named his daughter, Alexa Ray, after him, Charles contacted him saying that he'd love to do a song with Joel, as long as he had the "right song" in mind. When writing the song, Joel tried to compose it in the style of Charles' hit, "Georgia on My Mind", while also giving it a blues sound. Joel wrote the song over a single night. "It was one of those rare songs, like 'New York State of Mind', that seem to come all at once - it seemed almost as though I had heard it before."

Originally Joel sang the song in his thick Hicksville accent, and Charles did the same. According to Joel, Charles was very easy to work with. "He was just waiting for a cue from me," Joel recalled. "He would have taken the thing anywhere I wanted to take it." Originally, Joel was nervous about recording with Charles, and was unsure how to record the song. Producer Phil Ramone told Joel to "challenge him," and to do it the way Joel wanted to. So, Joel did his best impression of Charles, and Charles understood, and they sang together in the same style.

The song is an ode to the piano. It is a love song that extols the joy and solace of piano playing, and compares the piano to women, whilst the musicians both reflect on their lives and careers. The song is also a tribute to Charles himself, in the way it is composed, written, and performed. During the song, Charles and Joel play dual pianos; the music video for the song shows Joel and Charles both playing the piano right next to each other. The B-side of the single was another song off of the album, "Big Man on Mulberry Street".

== Reception ==
Reception for the song was mostly positive. Anthony DeCurtis of Rolling Stone said that Charles' "[turned] in an impressively genuine performance." Steve Morse of The Boston Globe said that the song was "engaging." However, Stephen Thomas Erlewine of Allmusic gave the song a negative review, saying that the song was "weighed down by Joel's vocal affectations." Stephen Holden believed that the song had a chance to become a "modern standard." Dave Hoekstra of the Chicago Sun-Times believed that because of the song, Joel "demands and deserves respect as a songwriter in this genre." The Philadelphia Inquirer believed that the song was the album's "obvious high point," saying that the song was "the apotheosis of the musical-instrument-as-woman genre."

David Brinn of The Jerusalem Post thought that the song was a "small pleasure." Nikki Tranter of PopMatters believed the song was a "stand-out" track. Lennox Samuels of The Dallas Morning News however, thought that the song was "hazy". The San Jose Mercury News said that "'Baby Grand' might be warmed-over Ray Charles, but Ray Charles is there to spice it up with his vocal and keyboard majesty." The Miami Herald said that "Baby Grand finds Joel actually convincing in the jazz testimonial setting, with Ray Charles and bassist Ray Brown contributing the aura of a jazz club." The Atlanta Journal-Constitution joked that "A much better collaboration is Joel and Ray Charles on 'Baby Grand'. Sure it's a little schmaltzy and overwrought, but compared to Stevie Wonder and Paul McCartney's 'Ebony and Ivory,' it's practically High Art." Steve Pond of the Los Angeles Times gave the song a negative review, saying, "Worst of all is the centerpiece, 'Baby Grand'. It's the piano man's love song to his faithful instrument, and even some help from Ray Charles can't salvage the most overly dramatic of all Joel's ballads."

== Charts ==
| Chart (1987) | Peak position |
|---|---|
| Australia (Kent Music Report) | 78 |
| U.S. Billboard Hot 100 | 75 |
| U.S. Billboard Adult Contemporary | 3 |
