= Pressure (Billy Joel song) =

Single by Billy Joel

from the album The Nylon Curtain
- B-side: "Laura"
- Released: September 1982
- Recorded: Spring 1982
- Studio: A&R (New York City); Mediasound (New York City)
- Genre: New wave; experimental pop
- Length: 4:40 (Album version); 3:16 (Single version)
- Label: Columbia
- Songwriter: Billy Joel
- Producer: Phil Ramone

Billy Joel singles chronology
"She's Got a Way (Live)" (1981)	"Pressure" (1982)	"Allentown" (1982)

Music video
- "Pressure" on YouTube

"Pressure" is a 1982 song by American musician Billy Joel from the album The Nylon Curtain, released as the album's first single and reached number 20 on the US Billboard Hot 100. The synthesizer-driven rock song tells about the pressure of creating and the pressure of being a provider.

== Themes and lyrics ==
In Night School, a show that aired on MTV in 1982 that ran roughly a half-hour long, in which he answered questions posed by audience members, Billy Joel revealed that the pressure he was talking about in the song was something along the lines of writing pressure and pressure to provide.

When I was starting out and trying to get things going, the pressure was if you don't get things going, they're going to throw you out of this apartment. There was that kind of pressure. "I'm hungry," my stomach was going, "pressure, food." I think that's pretty intense pressure. The pressure I was writing about in this song wasn't necessarily music business pressure, it was writing pressure. ... At the time, I was saying, "Well, I gotta write some more stuff for the album"; I was about halfway through, and I said, "Well, what am I gonna do? I don't have any ideas, it's gone, it's dead, I have nothing, nothing, nothing. There's nothing." And then the woman who is my secretary came into the house at that point and said, "Wow, you look like you're under a lot of pressure. I bet you that'd be a good idea for a song." And I went, "Thank you!"

The PBS children's TV series Sesame Street and New York PBS member station WNET ("channel 13") are mentioned in the first bridge, and the magazine Time is mentioned in the second.

== Single and album edits ==
The single version removes the third verse (starting with "Don't ask for help, you're all alone") and the second bridge. This version of the song was included in the original 1985 release of the Greatest Hits – Volume I & Volume II compilation album, but the full album version was restored for the remastered edition, as well as The Complete Hits Collection: 1973–1997. Radio stations vary in whether they play the shortened or the full version of the song. Playing the song on an episode of VH1 Storytellers in 1997, Joel (for humorous effect) modulated the opening piano motif to a major key, and commented that it sounded like a polka when played that way.

== Reception ==
Cash Box said that "the bass, drums and keyboards at times poke and pound like an annoying headache (appropriately, considering the theme) while sliding into briefly melodic calm at others." Billboard said that it shows Joel "learned lessons from new music acts while keeping his melodic instincts intact" and specifically commented on the drumming and vocal performance.

== Music video ==
The music video of the song features the full version, instead of the shortened one. A common motif in the video is the use of water, whether splashed on Joel's shoes, rushing out from school desks, or flooding his apartment. The video was directed by Russell Mulcahy and made its premiere on MTV on September 9, 1982. Several scenes in the video make references to movies such as A Clockwork Orange, Poltergeist and, in the framing sequence, The Parallax View.

== In popular culture ==
The song was featured in American satirical superhero television series The Boys.

== Charts ==
Chart (1982)	Peak position
Australia (Kent Music Report)	16
Canadian Singles Chart	9
French Singles Chart	72
Japan Singles Chart (Oricon)	78
New Zealand Singles Chart	24
US Billboard Hot 100	20
US Mainstream Rock (Billboard)	8
Zimbabwe Singles Chart	19

== Certifications ==
Region	Certification	Certified units/sales
United States (RIAA)	Gold	500,000^{‡}
^{‡} Sales+streaming figures based on certification alone.
