= Big Shot (song) =

- Dutch vinyl picture sleeve

Single by Billy Joel

from the album 52nd Street
- B-side: "Root Beer Rag", "Half a Mile Away"
- Released: January 1979
- Recorded: A & R Recording, Inc., New York City, 1978
- Genre: Hard rock; power pop
- Length: 4:03 (Album version); 3:43 (Single version)
- Label: Columbia
- Songwriter: Billy Joel
- Producer: Phil Ramone

Billy Joel singles chronology
"My Life" (1978)	"Big Shot" (1979)	"Honesty" (1979)

"Big Shot" is a song performed by Billy Joel from his 1978 album 52nd Street as its opening track, released as a single in early 1979. The song would become the second hit single from the album, peaking at No. 14 in the United States.

== Lyrics and music ==
The song is superficially about the protagonist mocking a woman with a severe hangover for her intoxicated escapades around town, making numerous social and verbal faux pas while high on alcohol and other drugs ("But now you just don't remember all the things you said / And you're not sure you want to know / I'll give you one hint, honey; you sure did put on a show!"). The song makes reference to late 1970s nouveau riche fads such as Elaine's restaurant and Halston.

During a Q&A session at Florida State University in 1996, Joel stated the song is about someone he was very close to, and also about himself. In an interview in 2006, Joel said, "I read that the song 'Big Shot' is said to be about a date I had with Bianca Jagger. I never had a date with Bianca Jagger." But in an interview with Howard Stern on November 16, 2010, Joel said the song was written after having dinner with Mick and Bianca Jagger. Joel told Stern that while writing the lyrics to "Big Shot", he was thinking of Mick singing the song to Bianca. In the official music video, Joel does appear to be mimicking Mick Jagger during the second verse.

== Reception ==
Billboard described "Big Shot" as "an upbeat rocker" with "very contemporary lyrical content", stating that it was driven by "powerfully rhythmic backing". Cash Box said it is "tough-edged and sassy" with "a dramatic arrangement of guitars, piano, horns and drums", a "rich" lyric and "catchy" vocals. Record World said that "Joel's fine sense of sarcasm and his finesse as a story-teller are perfectly blended."

Walter Everett characterized the song's live performances as "swaggering bravado", epitomized by Joel's stage presence through "stage-crossing, piano-hopping, chest-thumping performances".

== Release ==
The single release of the song had an abridged outro compared to the album version.

Live versions were released on the albums Kohuept, 2000 Years: The Millennium Concert, 12 Gardens Live, and My Lives.

=== Rock Band 3 ===
The song was made available to download on December 14, 2010, for use in the Rock Band 3 music gaming platform in both Basic rhythm, and PRO mode which allows the use of a real guitar/bass guitar, and MIDI-compatible electronic drum kits/keyboards in addition to vocals.

== Charts ==
Chart (1979)	Peak position
Australia (Kent Music Report)	91
Canadian Singles Chart	13
Israel (IBA)	9
New Zealand Singles Chart	36
U.S. Billboard Hot 100	14
U.S. Cash Box Top 100	13

=== Certifications ===
Region	Certification	Certified units/sales
United States (RIAA)	Gold	500,000^{‡}
^{‡} Sales+streaming figures based on certification alone.
