= Allentown (song) =

Single by Billy Joel

from the album The Nylon Curtain
- B-side: "Elvis Presley Blvd."
- Released: November 1982
- Recorded: 1982
- Genre: Folk rock; pop rock; heartland rock
- Length: 3:52
- Label: Columbia
- Songwriter: Billy Joel
- Producer: Phil Ramone

Billy Joel singles chronology
"Pressure" (1982)	"Allentown" (1982)	"Goodnight Saigon" (1983)

"Allentown" is a song by American singer Billy Joel and the lead track on Joel's 1982 album The Nylon Curtain. Released as the album's second single, it was accompanied by a conceptual music video. Upon its release, and especially in subsequent years, "Allentown" emerged as an anthem of blue-collar America, representing both the aspirations and frustrations of America's working class in the late 20th century, and lamenting the decline of the Rust Belt.

"Allentown" reached No. 17 on the Billboard Hot 100, spending six consecutive weeks at that position and certified gold. It was No. 43 on Billboard's year-end Hot 100 chart for 1983. The song later appeared on Joel's Greatest Hits: Volume II (1985), Kohuept (1987), 2000 Years: The Millennium Concert (2000), The Essential Billy Joel (2001), 12 Gardens Live (2006), The Hits (2010), and Live at Shea Stadium (2011) albums.

== Theme ==
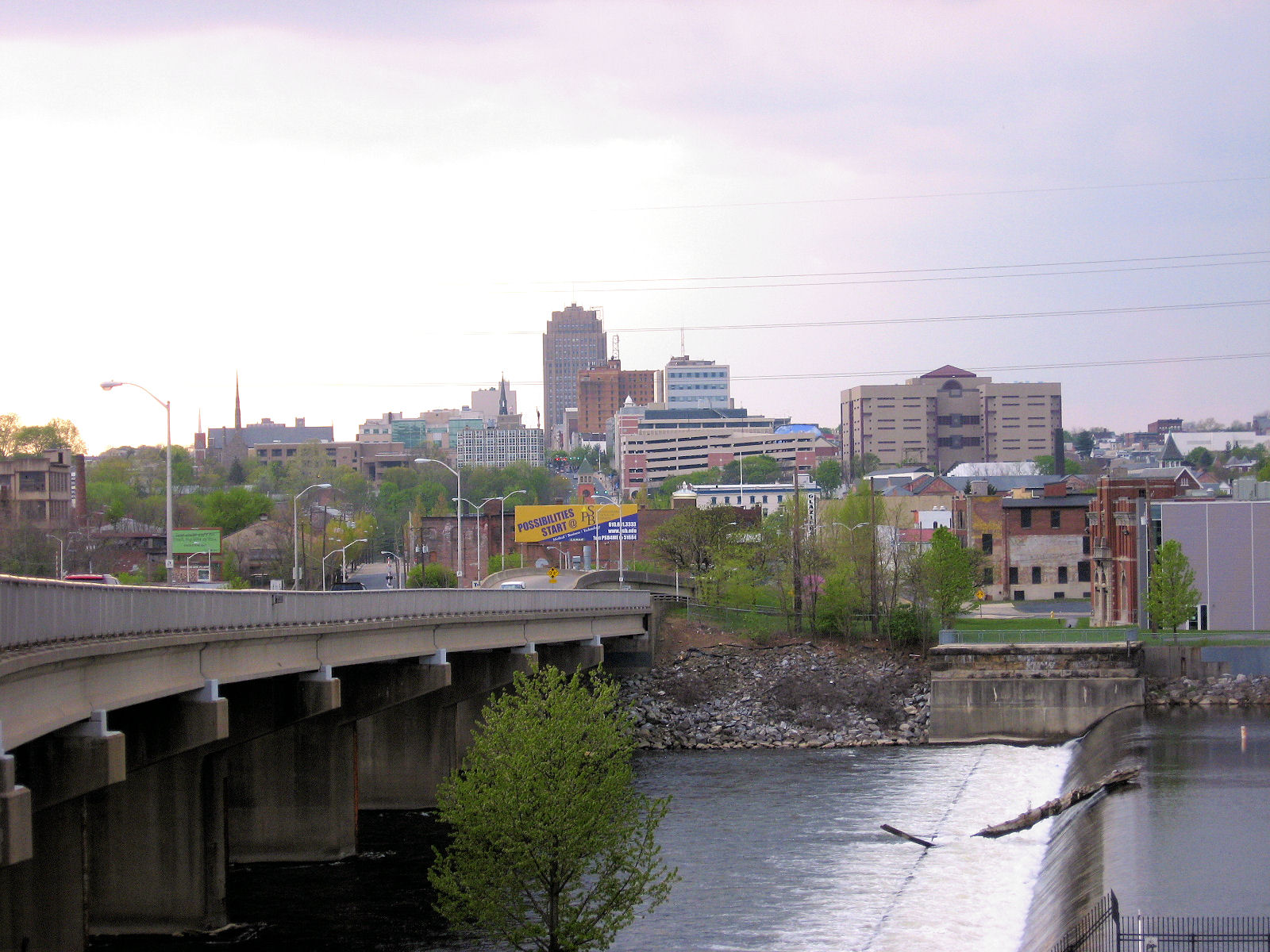
Allentown, Pennsylvania, for which the song is named

The song's theme centers around the resilience of Allentown, Pennsylvania and the surrounding Lehigh Valley region of eastern Pennsylvania in the 1980s as it coped with the decline of its historically strong manufacturing sector and its emergence as a part of the Rust Belt in the latter part of the 20th century, including the depressed, blue-collar livelihood of Allentown residents following the decline and eventual closure of Bethlehem Steel, which was the world's second-largest steel manufacturer for most of the 20th century.

The introductory rhythm for the song is designed to be the sound of a rolling mill converting steel ingots into I-beams or other shapes. Such a sound was commonly heard throughout South Bethlehem when the Bethlehem Steel plant was in operation from 1857 through 1995.

Joel regards the song as being "hopeful" towards the plight of the unemployed steel workers. Even though the lyrics tell a sad tale, Joel says the song's message is "we're not moving out or giving up...we're going to try."

== History ==
When Joel started writing the song, it was titled "Levittown", after the Long Island town next to Hicksville where Joel grew up. He originally wrote a chord progression and lyrics for the song, but struggled for a topic for the song. Joel remembered reading about the decline of the steel industry in the Lehigh Valley, which includes the cities of both Bethlehem and Allentown. Joel then changed the title to "Bethlehem" briefly, before switching to "Allentown" saying that Bethlehem carried too much of a religious connotation and he liked the rhyming potential of Allentown better anyway. Although Joel started writing the song in the late 1970s, it was not finished until 1982. The booklet in the 2-CD set Greatest Hits Volumes 1 and 2 lists the song as "copyrighted 1981" on page 17.

When Joel performed the song in Leningrad during a 1987 concert in the Soviet Union that was recorded and later released as Kohuept, he introduced the song by analogizing the situation to that then faced by Soviet youths: "This song is about young people living in the Northeast of America. Their lives are miserable because the steel factories are closing down. They desperately want to leave... but they stay because they were brought up to believe that things were going to get better. Maybe that sounds familiar."

== Critical reception ==
In November 1982, Cashbox wrote that, "The melody is a great deal more upbeat than the lyrics would indicate, but the message comes through nonetheless." Billboard said that "it uses expert pop structure to put over a message of bleak suburban despair."

== Reception in Allentown ==
The song met with mixed responses in Allentown. Some criticized the song as degrading and full of working-class stereotypes but when Joel returned to the area after the album's release and the song became a hit, he was awarded the key to the city by Allentown's mayor, who praised it as "a gritty song about a gritty city."

On December 27, 1982, Joel played before a sold-out crowd at Stabler Arena in neighboring Bethlehem. He opened and closed his set at Stabler Arena with "Allentown", receiving a five-minute standing ovation following its second performance. At the end of the song and ovation, Joel was greeted with even more sustained applause when, in an apparent defense of the song's meaning, he pointedly told the Bethlehem crowd, "Don't take any shit from anybody."

Also in 1983, Allentown's mayor Joseph Daddona sent a letter to Joel inquiring about Joel's willingness to share some royalties from the song for music scholarships in Allentown. Part of the letter read: "Not only would this fund be a great way to share a tiny part of your good fortune to others in Allentown, it would also help keep alive the 'Allentown' song and the Billy Joel legend (which you've already become here)."

== Music video ==
The video, directed by Russell Mulcahy and featuring choreography by Kenny Ortega, was in heavy rotation on MTV throughout 1982 and 1983. The original version of the video features partial male nudity at the beginning when male coal miners are taking a shower, which was edited out for its MTV airings.

== Other versions ==
- "Allentown" also has been covered by other artists, including John Mellencamp, who performed a slower, acoustic version of the song at a Kennedy Center tribute to Billy Joel on November 19, 1994.
- In the 2011 movie The Hangover Part II, Ed Helms sings a profane, parody version of "Allentown" to Zach Galifianakis as they ride in a boat in Thailand. The version appears on the film's soundtrack, The Hangover Part II: Original Motion Picture Soundtrack.

== Charts ==
=== Weekly charts ===
Chart (1982–1983)	Peak position
Australia (Kent Music Report)	49
Canada Top Singles (RPM)	21
Israel (IBA)	18
New Zealand (RIANZ)	37
UK Airplay (Record Business)	46
US Billboard Hot 100	17
US Adult Contemporary (Billboard)	19
US Mainstream Rock (Billboard)	28
US Cash Box Top 100	14

=== Year-end charts ===
Chart (1983)	Rank
U.S. Billboard Hot 100	43
U.S. Cash Box	92

== Certifications ==
Region	Certification	Certified units/sales
United States (RIAA)	Gold	500,000^{‡}
^{‡} Sales+streaming figures based on certification alone.
