= You May Be Right =

Single by Billy Joel

from the album Glass Houses
- B-side: "Close to the Borderline"
- Released: March 7, 1980
- Genre: Hard rock; new wave; power pop; pop rock
- Length: 4:15 (album version); 3:58 (7" version)
- Label: Columbia
- Songwriter: Billy Joel
- Producer: Phil Ramone

Billy Joel singles chronology
"All for Leyna" (1980)	"You May Be Right" (1980)	"It's Still Rock and Roll to Me" (1980)

Music video
- "You May Be Right" on YouTube

"You May Be Right" is a song written and performed by rock singer Billy Joel, released as a single and the opening track from his 1980 album Glass Houses. The single reached No. 7 on the US charts and No. 6 in Canada. It failed to chart, however, in the UK, unlike his preceding and succeeding singles "All for Leyna" (UK #40) and "It's Still Rock and Roll to Me" (UK #14). The Japanese single features "Close to the Borderline" as a B-side.

The song is the first track off the album and begins with the sound of broken glass, which is included to metaphorically signify the smashing of the glass house from which the album is named. "You May Be Right" is also on Billy Joel's Greatest Hits – Volume I & Volume II (on disc 2) and the live albums 2000 Years: The Millennium Concert, 12 Gardens Live, and Live at Shea Stadium: The Concert. A live duet with Elton John appears on the box set My Lives.

== Reception ==
Cash Box said that the song is "witty, urbane and energetic," and that the "hard guitar" playing is "reminiscent of Chuck Berry and the Rolling Stones." Record World said that "Joel's rock energy blends well with his pop melodies on this smashing cut."

== Music video ==
The video version differs from the album version. The most notable difference is the intro, where the sound of shattering glass is replaced with "one, two, one, two, three, four". The video version is also considerably shorter, missing the two final verses.

== Personnel ==
- Billy Joel – vocals, acoustic piano, harmonica
- Dave Brown – electric guitar
- Russell Javors – electric guitar
- Doug Stegmeyer – bass guitar
- Liberty DeVitto – drums, percussion
- Richie Cannata – saxophone solo

== Charts ==
=== Weekly charts ===
Chart (1980–81)	Peak position
Australia (Kent Music Report)	28
Canada Top Singles (RPM)	6
Israel (Israeli Singles Chart)	1
Japan Oricon Singles Chart	60
New Zealand Singles Chart	23
South African Singles Chart	14
UK Airplay (Record Business)	64
US Billboard Hot 100	7
US Adult Contemporary (Billboard)	48

=== Year-end charts ===
Chart (1980)	Rank
Canada	40
U.S. Billboard Hot 100	75

== Certifications ==
Region	Certification	Certified units/sales
New Zealand (RMNZ)	Gold	15,000^{‡}
United States (RIAA)	Platinum	1,000,000^{‡}
^{‡} Sales+streaming figures based on certification alone.
