= Goodnight Saigon =

Single by Billy Joel

from the album The Nylon Curtain
- B-side: "A Room of Our Own"
- Released: February 1983
- Recorded: Winter 1981–spring 1982
- Genre: Art rock; pop rock
- Length: 7:03 (album version); 5:44 (single version)
- Label: Columbia
- Songwriter: Billy Joel
- Producer: Phil Ramone

Billy Joel singles chronology
| "Allentown" (1982) | "Goodnight Saigon" (1983) | "Tell Her About It" (1983) |

Music video
- "Goodnight Saigon" on YouTube

"Goodnight Saigon" is a song written by Billy Joel, originally appearing on his 1982 album The Nylon Curtain, about the Vietnam War. It depicts the situation and attitude of United States Marines beginning with their military training on Parris Island and then into different aspects of Vietnam combat.

== Lyrics and music ==
The lyrics of "Goodnight Saigon" are about Marines in battle bonding together, fighting their fears and trying to figure out how to survive. The singer, a Marine, sings of "we" rather than "I", emphasizing that the Marines are all in the situation together. In the bridge, Joel sings of the darkness and the fear it induced in the Marines. This leads into the refrain, which has multiple voices coming together to sing that the Marines will "all go down together", emphasizing their camaraderie.

Images from the war captured in the song include reading Playboy, seeing Bob Hope, listening to the Doors, smoking from a hash pipe, praying to Jesus, remembering "Charlie" and "Baker", the Company identifiers used in military units, and those in those Companies who "left their childhood / on every acre", many of whom died in the fighting. Joel has said that he "wasn't trying to make a comment on the war, but writing about the soldier as a person". According to Rolling Stone critic Stephen Holden, "As the song unfolds, Joel's 'we' becomes every American soldier, living and dead, who fought in Southeast Asia."

The song begins with the sound of crickets chirping, providing the feeling of evening coming, the sound morphing into the tinkling of wind chimes at night. This leads into the sound of helicopters, which conjures up images of helicopters carrying their loads of Marines into battle in the Vietnam War or picking up wounded Marines. Then Joel plays a figure on the piano before beginning to sing. The opening is reversed at the end of the song, as the piano figure returns, followed by the sound of helicopters, then wind chimes, and finally the crickets, before the song comes to an end.

Joel has said of the song:

Time has a way of healing wounds or making them easier to look at to see if they've scabbed up. The guys came home from Vietnam and that's it? It doesn't end until these guys are absorbed into the mainstream and we deal with our feelings about it.

== Critical reception ==
Billboard called it "uncompromisingly bleak" and said that "The style is subdued and intense, with a strong influence of Kurt Weill." Cash Box praised it for successfully "making a meaningful statement about the Vietnam war within the confines of a pop song". Holden describes the song as possibly "the ultimate pop-music epitaph to the Vietnam War." He also praises the way Joel's voice captures the emotions of a 19-year-old soldier. However, fellow Rolling Stone critic Dave Marsh considers it bordering on "obscenity" that the song "refuses to take sides". AllMusic critic Stephen Thomas Erlewine considers it part of a suite on side one of The Nylon Curtain that represents "layered, successful, mature pop that brings Joel tantalizingly close to his ultimate goal of sophisticated pop/rock for mature audiences". Musician Garth Brooks has identified "Goodnight Saigon" as his favorite Billy Joel song. Producer Phil Ramone has stated that the song's symbolism "resonates with many people—especially musicians".

== Other appearances ==
"Goodnight Saigon" is regularly featured in Joel's concerts, and live versions were released on the albums Kohuept, 12 Gardens Live, Live at Shea Stadium: The Concert, and My Lives. It has also been included on several compilation albums, including Greatest Hits, Souvenir: The Ultimate Collection, The Ultimate Collection, The Essential Billy Joel, and Piano Man: The Very Best of Billy Joel.

A shortened version of "Goodnight Saigon" was sung by Will Ferrell in a Saturday Night Live sketch, on May 16, 2009, a sketch that also featured cameos by Green Day, Norm Macdonald, Maya Rudolph, Amy Poehler, Tom Hanks, Paul Rudd, Artie Lange, and Anne Hathaway, among others, as background musicians.

"Goodnight Saigon" was included in the play Movin' Out in a scene where one of the characters has a nightmare of his experiences fighting in Vietnam.

Alan Cumming has included this song on his album Alan Cumming Sings Sappy Songs: Live at the Cafe Carlyle. He sings it in touching memory of his grandfather, Tommy Darling.

Garth Brooks Performed "Goodnight Saigon" for Billy Joel and the Obamas at the 2013 Kennedy Center Honors. A choir composed of dozens of men and women who were of an age to have served in Vietnam - many appearing in uniform - joined Brooks for the final chorus.

== Charts ==
=== Weekly charts ===
| Chart (1983–84) | Peak position |
|---|---|
| Belgium (Ultratop 50 Flanders) | 1 |
| Irish Singles Chart | 19 |
| Netherlands (Dutch Top 40) | 1 |
| Netherlands (Single Top 100) | 1 |
| UK Singles Chart | 29 |
| U.S. Billboard Hot 100 | 56 |

=== Year-end charts ===
| Chart (1983) | Position |
|---|---|
| Belgium (Ultratop 50 Flanders) | 22 |
| Netherlands (Dutch Top 40) | 15 |
| Netherlands (Single Top 100) | 3 |

== Certifications and sales ==
| Region | Certification | Certified units/sales |
|---|---|---|
| Netherlands (NVPI) | Gold | 100,000^{^} |
^{^} Shipments figures based on certification alone.

== See also ==
- List of anti-war songs
