= Say Goodbye to Hollywood =

Billy Joel song

- 1976 single picture sleeve

Single by Billy Joel

from the album Turnstiles
- B-side: "Stop in Nevada"
- Released: November 1976 (UK)
- Recorded: 1976 at Ultrasonic Recording Studios, Hempstead, New York
- Genre: Pop rock
- Length: 4:38 (album version); 3:53 (single version)
- Label: Columbia
- Songwriter: Billy Joel
- Producer: Billy Joel

Billy Joel singles chronology
"The Entertainer" (1974)	"Say Goodbye to Hollywood" (1976)	"James" (1976)

"Say Goodbye to Hollywood"
- Cover art for the 1981 single

Single by Billy Joel

from the album Songs in the Attic
- B-side: "Summer, Highland Falls"
- Released: September 9, 1981
- Recorded: June 1980 at Milwaukee Arena, Milwaukee, WI
- Genre: Pop rock
- Length: 4:25
- Label: Columbia
- Songwriter: Billy Joel
- Producer: Phil Ramone

Billy Joel singles chronology
"Sometimes a Fantasy" (1980)	"Say Goodbye to Hollywood" (1981)	"She's Got a Way (Live)" (1981)

"Say Goodbye to Hollywood" is a song written and performed by Billy Joel, first released in 1976 on his album Turnstiles as its opening track. It was originally released in the United States as the B-side to "I've Loved These Days" before being released as A-side in various countries like the UK, Germany and Australia in November 1976, with "Stop in Nevada" as the B-side. However, the song achieved greater recognition when a live version from Songs in the Attic, issued September 9th, 1981, was released as a US single, with the live version of "Summer, Highland Falls" as a B-side. Joel wrote the song after moving back to New York City in 1975; he had previously relocated to Los Angeles in 1972 in an attempt to get out of an onerous record deal. The character who represents this song on the Turnstiles album cover is the man wearing sunglasses and a leather jacket and holding a suitcase.

== Production and influence ==
Joel has stated in his university lectures that he wrote the song with Ronnie Spector and the Ronettes song "Be My Baby" in mind. Indeed, Joel notes that the two songs share a very similar beat, recycling the iconic drum intro of "Be My Baby." The song's production was also specifically modeled on the "Wall of Sound" production method of her ex-husband Phil Spector, who produced "Be My Baby" in that manner. The song utilized a backing band throughout the track, with new instrumental layers appearing throughout the song, such as backup singers in the refrain and strings starting from the second verse. However, whether this effect had been achieved was in dispute, with biographer Mark Bego claiming it was successful in this regard, while music critic Stephen Holden disagreed. Billboard said that it "has the intensity and flair of Phil Spector's early '60s classics." Record World said that the live version "sounds better than the original," with "a perfect blend of concert spontaneity and studio clarity."

== Cover versions ==
- Ronnie Spector and the E Street Band released their version as a single in 1977. Record World said that "Great and mystical forces have combined to make Ronnie's return (and her label debut) a smash. Miami Steve's production does her proud."

== Charts ==
Chart (1976)	Peak position
Australia (Kent Music Report)	45
Chart (1981)	Peak position
Canadian Singles Chart	27
Israel (IBA)	15
U.S. Billboard Hot 100	17
U.S. Billboard Adult Contemporary	35
