= Turnstiles (album) =

Studio album by Billy Joel
- Released: May 19, 1976
- Recorded: June 1975–January 1976
- Studios: Ultra-Sonic Studios, Hempstead; Strings at Columbia Recording Studios, New York; Overdubs at Caribou Recording Studios, Nederland
- Genres: Soft rock; pop rock; progressive rock
- Length: 36:22
- Label: Family Productions/Columbia
- Producer: Billy Joel

Billy Joel chronology
Streetlife Serenade (1974)	Turnstiles (1976)	The Stranger (1977)

Singles from Turnstiles
- 1. "James" Released: July 1976; 2. "I've Loved These Days" Released: October 1976; 3. "Say Goodbye to Hollywood" Released: November 1976

Turnstiles is the fourth studio album by American singer-songwriter Billy Joel, released on May 19, 1976, by Family Productions and Columbia Records.

== Production ==
Joel recorded Turnstiles in part as a celebration of his return to his native New York City. Three of the album's tracks reference New York: "Summer, Highland Falls", "New York State of Mind" and "Miami 2017 (Seen the Lights Go Out on Broadway)". It begins with "Say Goodbye to Hollywood" (inspired by the Ronettes song "Be My Baby") and also includes "I've Loved These Days", a tongue-in-cheek expression of regret at leaving behind Hollywood decadence. In an interview, Joel stated that the lyrics to the song "James" referred to various different people he knew in real life, with the title character being a "composite" of those people. In the song "Prelude/Angry Young Man", Joel opens and closes the song rapidly hammering the piano, which was meant to simulate the drum part in the song "Wipe Out" by the Surfaris.

The songs were first recorded at Caribou Ranch (near Nederland, Colorado), with members of Elton John's band (Nigel Olsson on drums and Dee Murray on bass) and produced by Chicago producer James William Guercio. Dissatisfied with the results, Joel took over as producer and returned to New York, where he re-recorded the album from start to finish, with his own touring band, which consisted of Long Island musicians Richie Cannata and the members of the band Topper: Liberty DeVitto, Russell Javors, Howie Emerson, and Doug Stegmeyer. Turnstiles marked the first time that Joel's band played on one of his studio albums.

The album cover photo was shot in the uptown platform of the New York City Subway's Astor Place station. According to Joel, each of the characters on the album cover was meant to represent a particular song (e.g., the girl in headphones for "All You Wanna Do Is Dance", the wealthy couple for "I've Loved These Days").

Barbra Streisand covered "New York State of Mind" on her album Superman, released in the Spring of 1977, opening up Billy Joel's music to a mainstream audience. He thanked her for the exposure, and also told her his New York relatives were duly impressed to have the Queen of Brooklyn cover one of his songs.

== Critical reception ==
Professional ratings
Review scores
Source	Rating
AllMusic	4.5/5 stars
Blender	5/5 stars
Christgau's Record Guide	C+
The Rolling Stone Album Guide	3.5/5 stars

Robert Christgau of The Village Voice wrote that Joel's craft improves, but "he becomes more obnoxious: the anti-idealism of 'Angry Young Man' isn't any more appealing in tandem with the pseudoironic sybaritism of 'I've Loved These Days.'" In a retrospective review, Stephen Thomas Erlewine of AllMusic wrote that "the key to the record's success is variety, the way the album whips from the bouncy, McCartney-esque 'All You Wanna Do Is Dance' to the saloon song 'New York State of Mind'; the way the bitterly cynical "Angry Young Man" gives way to the beautiful 'I've Loved These Days' and the surrealistic apocalyptic fantasy 'Miami 2017 (Seen the Lights Go Out on Broadway).' No matter how much stylistic ground Joel covers, he's kept on track by his backing group."

Cash Box called the single "James" "a song to an old friend, wondering what he’s doing now", saying "This beautiful tune kicks off with some sensitive playing on the Fender Rhodes, accompanied solely by bass. Gradually, as the song builds, so does the instrumentation."

Cash Box said that the single "I've Loved These Days" creates "a perfect mood of grand cinema romance" and commented on "its elegant strings and crashing piano." Record World said that "both melody and lyrics stand out on this powerful ballad, that could put him over the top."

== Track listing ==
All tracks are written by Billy Joel.

Side one
No.	Title	Length
1.	"Say Goodbye to Hollywood"	4:36
2.	"Summer, Highland Falls"	3:15
3.	"All You Wanna Do Is Dance"	3:40
4.	"New York State of Mind"	5:58

Side two
No.	Title	Length
5.	"James"	3:53
6.	"Prelude/Angry Young Man"	5:17
7.	"I've Loved These Days"	4:31
8.	"Miami 2017 (Seen the Lights Go Out on Broadway)"	5:12
Total length:		36:22

Many tracks have alternate mixes exclusive to the Quadrophonic LP release including "New York State of Mind", "Prelude/Angry Young Man", "I've Loved These Days" and "Miami 2017 (Seen the Lights Go Out on Broadway)". Contrary to some sources, the saxophone solo on "New York State of Mind" was never re-recorded by Phil Woods for the release of Greatest Hits, Vols. I and II. The only time that Phil Woods performed on a Billy Joel recording was the song "Just the Way You Are" in 1977.

== Personnel ==
Adapted from the album liner notes.

- Billy Joel – vocals, acoustic piano, electric piano, Moog synthesizer, clavinet, organ
- Doug Stegmeyer – bass guitar
- Liberty DeVitto – drums
- Howie Emerson – electric and acoustic guitars
- Russell Javors – electric and acoustic guitars
- James Smith – acoustic guitar
- Mingo Lewis – percussion
- Richard Cannata – saxophone, clarinet
- Ken Ascher – orchestral arrangements

=== Technical ===
- Produced by Billy Joel
- Engineered by John Bradley
- Engineer (Orchestra) – Don Puluse
- Tape engineer – Lou Waxman
- Mixed by Bruce Botnick at Caribou Recording Studios
- Basic track consultant – Brian Ruggles
- Project coordination – Jo Buckley
- Cover design – John Berg
- Cover photography – Jerry Abramowitz
- Cover lettering – Gerard Huerta

== Charts ==
=== Weekly charts ===
Chart (1976–77)	Peak position
Australia (Kent Music Report)	12
U.S. Billboard 200	122
Chart (2004)	Position
Japanese Albums (Oricon)	286

=== Year-end charts ===
Chart (1976)	Position
Australia (Kent Music Report)	32

=== Certifications ===
Region	Certification	Certified units/sales
Australia (ARIA)	Gold	20,000^{^}
United States (RIAA)	Platinum	1,000,000^{^}
^{^} Shipments figures based on certification alone.
