= Only the Good Die Young =

- A-side label of U.S. vinyl single

Single by Billy Joel

from the album The Stranger
- B-side: "Get It Right the First Time"
- Released: May 1978
- Recorded: 1977
- Genre: Pop rock; boogie rock
- Length: 3:55
- Label: Columbia
- Songwriter: Billy Joel
- Producer: Phil Ramone

Billy Joel singles chronology
"The Stranger" (1978)	"Only the Good Die Young" (1978)	"My Life" (1978)

"Only the Good Die Young" is a song written and recorded by Billy Joel from his fifth studio album The Stranger (1977), released in 1978 as its third of four singles.

== Background ==
"Only the Good Die Young" was controversial for its time, with the lyrics written from the perspective of a young man determined to have sex with a Catholic girl. The song was inspired by a high school love interest of Joel's, Virginia Callahan. The boy/narrator believes that the girl is refusing him because she comes from a religious Catholic family and that she believes premarital sex is sinful. He sings,

You Catholic girls start much too late,
but sooner or later it comes down to fate.
I might as well be the one.

Attempts to censor the song only made it more popular, after religious groups considered it anti-Catholic, and pressured radio stations to remove it from their playlists. "When I wrote 'Only the Good Die Young', the point of the song wasn't so much anti-Catholic as pro-lust," Joel told Performing Songwriter magazine. "The minute they banned it, the album started shooting up the charts." In a 2008 interview, Joel also pointed out one part of the lyrics that virtually all the song's critics missed – the boy in the song failed to get anywhere with the girl, and she kept her chastity.

In 2023, Joel said of the song "It's occurred to me recently that I'm trying to talk some poor innocent woman into losing her virginity because of my lust. It's kind of a selfish song – like, who cares what happens to you? What about what I want? ... But on the other hand, it was of its time. This was written in the mid-'70s, and I was trying to seduce girls. Why bullshit about it?"

== Reception ==
Billboard described "Only the Good Die Young" as one of Joel's "strongest and catchiest" songs. Cash Box said that "Billy grabs the fun with a rollicking, handclapping beat, raspy sax solo and racy piano licks."

== Demo version ==
A demo, included in the box set My Lives, is a slower, reggae version of the song. Joel reprised the song's motif in this version with a church organ. Joel has stated publicly that he changed the reggae beat to a shuffle beat at the request of his long time drummer, Liberty DeVitto, who hated reggae music.

== Track listing ==
=== 7" single (1978) ===
1. "Only the Good Die Young" – (3:55)
2. "Get It Right the First Time" – (3:32)

== Charts ==
=== Weekly charts ===
Chart (1978)	Peak position
Canada RPM Top Singles	18
U.S. Billboard Hot 100	24
U.S. Cash Box Top 100	25

=== Year-end charts ===
Chart (1978)	Rank
Canada	150

== Certifications ==
Region	Certification	Certified units/sales
New Zealand (RMNZ)	Platinum	30,000^{‡}
United States (RIAA)	3× Platinum	3,000,000^{‡}
^{‡} Sales+streaming figures based on certification alone.
