= New York State of Mind =

Song by Billy Joel

from the album Turnstiles
- Released: May 19, 1976
- Studio: Ultra Sonic Studio in Hempstead, New York
- Genre: Rock; jazz
- Length: 6:00
- Label: Columbia
- Songwriter: Billy Joel
- Producer: Billy Joel

"New York State of Mind" is a song by Billy Joel from his fourth studio album, Turnstiles (1976). Although never released as a single, it is both critically-acclaimed and amongst the most covered of Joel's songs. Joel plays it fairly regularly in concert. In October 2001, he performed it at the Concert for New York City, the benefit concert for members of the New York City Fire and Police Departments, as well as the loved ones and families of first responders killed during the September 11 attacks. He reprised the song and theme, playing it during his set at 12-12-12: The Concert for Sandy Relief at Madison Square Garden in New York City on December 12, 2012, when he changed lyrics to include "Breezy Point" and "Oceanside".

An early version of the song appeared on the double LP Live at the Great American Music Hall, 1975 (recorded at the Great American Music Hall, San Francisco in June 1975). This was released first in November 2021 as part of the box set Billy Joel: The Vinyl Collection, Vol. 1, then in its own right on April 22, 2023 (for that year's Record Store Day). Ean Evans commented that some of the emphasis from his guitar playing on this recording was later copied by Joel on the piano.

The Turnstiles version received some initial airplay on FM and New York pop radio stations, and a cover of "New York State of Mind" led a two-song medley on the 1976 album To The Heart, by jazz-influenced English pop group Mark-Almond. However, the song only began to attract significant attention after it was recorded by Barbra Streisand for her hit album Superman (1977).

== Inspiration ==
Having spent three years in Los Angeles, in 1975 Joel returned home to the East Coast unhappy and disillusioned. This theme runs through most of the songs on Turnstiles, including "Say Goodbye to Hollywood", "I've Loved These Days", "Summer, Highland Falls", and "Miami 2017 (Seen the Lights Go Out on Broadway)".

The inspiration for the song came from his pride in returning home to New York. Joel was literally "takin' a Greyhound [bus] on the Hudson River Line [route]" when the idea for the song came to him, and it was written as soon as he arrived at his new home in Highland Falls. It was Joel's attempt to create a standard, which he had wanted to do since playing covers of traditional standards at The Executive Room, a piano bar in Los Angeles where he worked for six months. The music is in quadruple ( 4/4 ) time, and in the key of C major. The understated orchestral backing, arranged by Ken Ascher, achieves a "superb balance" between piano and strings.

== Personnel ==
- Billy Joel – piano, vocals
- Ken Ascher – orchestral arrangements
- Richie Cannata – saxophone
- Liberty DeVitto – drums
- Doug Stegmeyer – bass

== Other performances ==
Since the 1976 release of Turnstiles and subsequent recording of "New York State of Mind" by Barbra Streisand, the song has become a pop standard and been covered by artists such as Carmen McRae (1980), Shirley Bassey (1982), Oleta Adams (1993), and Tony Bennett. In an interview with Rolling Stone, Joel named Streisand's version as a personal favorite, and said that he had wanted Ray Charles to record the song.

Bennett and Joel recorded the song as a duet for Bennett's 2001 album Playin' with My Friends: Bennett Sings the Blues, receiving a Grammy nomination for Best Pop Collaboration with Vocals at the 2002 Grammy Awards. They performed the song live to open the ceremony, and again in July 2008 during Joel's two concerts to mark the closure of Shea Stadium.

Joel has also performed duets of the song with Elton John during their collaborative Face-To-Face Tour, with the country singer Garth Brooks during Brooks' Central Park Concert in 1997, and with Bruce Springsteen and the E Street Band as one of Springsteen's special guests during his performance at the "Rock and Roll Hall of Fame 25th Anniversary Concert" at Madison Square Garden in New York City on October 29, 2009.

The song was played in Boston by Emma Stanganelli, most notably in a duet with Billy Joel in Fenway Park during his 2014 tour.

In 2014, Joel rerecorded the song as a duet with Barbra Streisand for her album Partners.

Deana Martin recorded “New York State Of Mind” on her 2016 album Swing Street.

Jazz pianist Brad Mehldau covered the song on his 2020 album Suite: April 2020.

== In popular culture ==
Floyd Pepper, accompanied by Dr. Teeth and Zoot, performed "New York State of Mind" on The Muppet Show (first on the UK, then with different choreography, the US edition). A recording of this version, sung by Jerry Nelson, was included on the 1978 album The Muppet Show 2. A later interpretation by Jim Henson as Rowlf the Dog appeared on the album Ol' Brown Ears Is Back (1993).

In the 2004 film Garfield: The Movie, the eponymous Garfield (Bill Murray) sings a parody of the song entitled "New Dog State of Mind" (described by Dave Germain of the Associated Press as the film's "low point").

Also in 2004, Joel agreed a deal with US publisher Scholastic for the release of two illustrated children's books, based on the lyrics of "Lullabye (Goodnight, My Angel)" and "New York State of Mind". Goodnight, My Angel (A Lullabye) appeared later that year, with artwork by Yvonne Gilbert. New York State of Mind followed in 2005, illustrated by Izak Zenou. The book had a picture of the Empire State Building on the front cover, and included a recording of the song on CD.

In the second season of Daredevil: Born Again, Bullseye kills members of Anti-Vigilante Task Force in a diner while "New York State of Mind" plays in the background.

Following the New York Knicks winning the 2026 NBA Finals, an advertisement featuring the song from Nike played immediately after the win and was well-received.

== Certifications ==
Region	Certification	Certified units/sales
United Kingdom (BPI) Sales since 2004	Silver	200,000^{‡}
United States (RIAA)	Platinum	1,000,000^{‡}
^{‡} Sales+streaming figures based on certification alone.
