= My Life (Billy Joel song) =

1978 single by Billy Joel

- Dutch, French and German picture sleeve

Single by Billy Joel

from the album 52nd Street
- B-side: "52nd Street"
- Released: October 1978
- Recorded: 1978
- Genre: Rock; pop rock; jazz rock
- Length: 4:44 (album version); 3:50 (single version)
- Label: Columbia
- Songwriter: Billy Joel
- Producer: Phil Ramone

Billy Joel singles chronology
"Only the Good Die Young" (1978)	"My Life" (1978)	"Big Shot" (1979)

"My Life" is a song by Billy Joel that first appeared on his 1978 album 52nd Street. A single version was released in the fall of 1978 and reached No. 2 on the U.S. adult contemporary chart. Early the next year, it peaked at No. 3 on the Billboard Hot 100.

== Musical structure ==
The song begins with drums, bass guitar, and a left-hand piano part, followed by a keyboard riff in the right hand. The riff is also used as a fill between verse and chorus sections and is also played at the end. The section order is intro-verse-fill-chorus-bridge-v-f-c-b-solo-c-outro.

Chicago members Peter Cetera and Donnie Dacus perform the backing vocals and sing along with Joel during the bridge and in the outro ("Keep it to yourself, it's my life").

== Reception ==
Billboard described "My Life" as "an infectious uptempo tune guaranteeing a good mood for the listener". Cash Box said that the "jumpy, upfront beat, keyboards, and acoustic guitar lines back Joel's strong singing" and praised the "musical and lyrical hooks". Record World called it a "Top 40 & adult [oriented rock] natural".

== Television theme ==
A recording of this song by Gary Bennett was used as the theme song for the situation comedy TV series, Bosom Buddies.

== Music video ==
The music video begins with outdoor shots of New York City, along with Joel and his band walking to a recording studio. The video also features a performance at A&R Recording Studios, which was directed by Steve Cohen.

== Personnel ==
- Billy Joel – lead and backing vocals, acoustic piano (layered with a Yamaha CP-70 electric grand piano), synthesizers
- David Brown – electric guitar
- Russell Javors – acoustic guitar
- Doug Stegmeyer – bass
- Liberty DeVitto – drums
- Richie Cannata – clarinet
- Peter Cetera – backing vocals
- Donnie Dacus – backing vocals

== Charts ==
=== Weekly charts ===
Chart (1978–1979)	Peak position
Australia (Kent Music Report)	6
Austria (Ö3 Austria Top 40)	11
Belgium (Ultratop 50 Flanders)	27
Canada Top Singles (RPM)	3
Canada Adult Contemporary (RPM)	2
France (SNEP)	6
Irish Singles Chart	3
Israel (IBA)	1
Japan (Oricon)	37
Netherlands (Dutch Top 40)	23
Netherlands (Single Top 100)	22
New Zealand (Recorded Music NZ)	6
Rhodesia (Lyons Maid)	1
South Africa (RISA)	2
Spain (Promusicae)	13
Switzerland (Schweizer Hitparade)	4
UK Singles (Official Charts)	12
UK Airplay (Record Business)	3
US Cash Box Top 100	3
US Billboard Hot 100	3
US Adult Contemporary (Billboard)	2

=== Year-end charts ===
Chart (1978)	Position
Canada Top Singles (RPM)	109

Chart (1979)	Position
Australia (Kent Music Report)	65
Brazil (Crowley)	65
Canada Top Singles (RPM)	26
South Africa (RISA)	10
US Billboard Hot 100	28

== Certifications ==
Region	Certification	Certified units/sales
Canada (Music Canada)	Gold	75,000^{^}
New Zealand (RMNZ)	2× Platinum	60,000^{‡}
United Kingdom (BPI) Physical	Silver	250,000^{^}
United Kingdom (BPI) Digital	Gold	400,000^{‡}
United States (RIAA)	3× Platinum	3,000,000^{‡}
^{^} Shipments figures based on certification alone.^{‡} Sales+streaming figures based on certification alone.
