= Modern Woman =

Single by Billy Joel

from the album The Bridge
- B-side: "Sleeping with the Television On"
- Released: 1986
- Genre: Rock
- Length: 3:48
- Label: Columbia
- Songwriter: Billy Joel
- Producer: Phil Ramone

Billy Joel singles chronology
"The Night Is Still Young" (1985)	"Modern Woman" (1986)	"A Matter of Trust" (1986)

"Modern Woman" is a song performed by Billy Joel from his album The Bridge. It was the album's lead-off single and was featured on the soundtrack to the film Ruthless People. In the film, the song removes an instrumental break present in the original. It was a Top 10 hit on Billboard Hot 100 chart in 1986.

== Reception ==
Cash Box called it "a chugging, instantly appealing cut". Billboard said: "phrases turn with top hat-and-tails flair, rhythm track barrels along like the last of the steam powered trains".

== Personnel ==
- Billy Joel – lead and backing vocals, synthesizers
- David Brown – guitar
- Russell Javors – guitar
- Liberty DeVitto – drums
- Doug Stegmeyer – bass guitar
- Mark Rivera – tenor saxophone

Additional personnel

- Rob Mounsey – orchestration
- Jimmy Bralower – percussion

== Charts ==
Chart (1986)	Peak position
Australia (Kent Music Report)	21
Canada Top Singles (RPM)	27
Israel (IBA)	17
New Zealand (Recorded Music NZ)	28
US Billboard Hot 100	10
US Adult Contemporary (Billboard)	7
US Mainstream Rock (Billboard)	34
