= List of Billy Joel band members =

Supporting band of Billy Joel

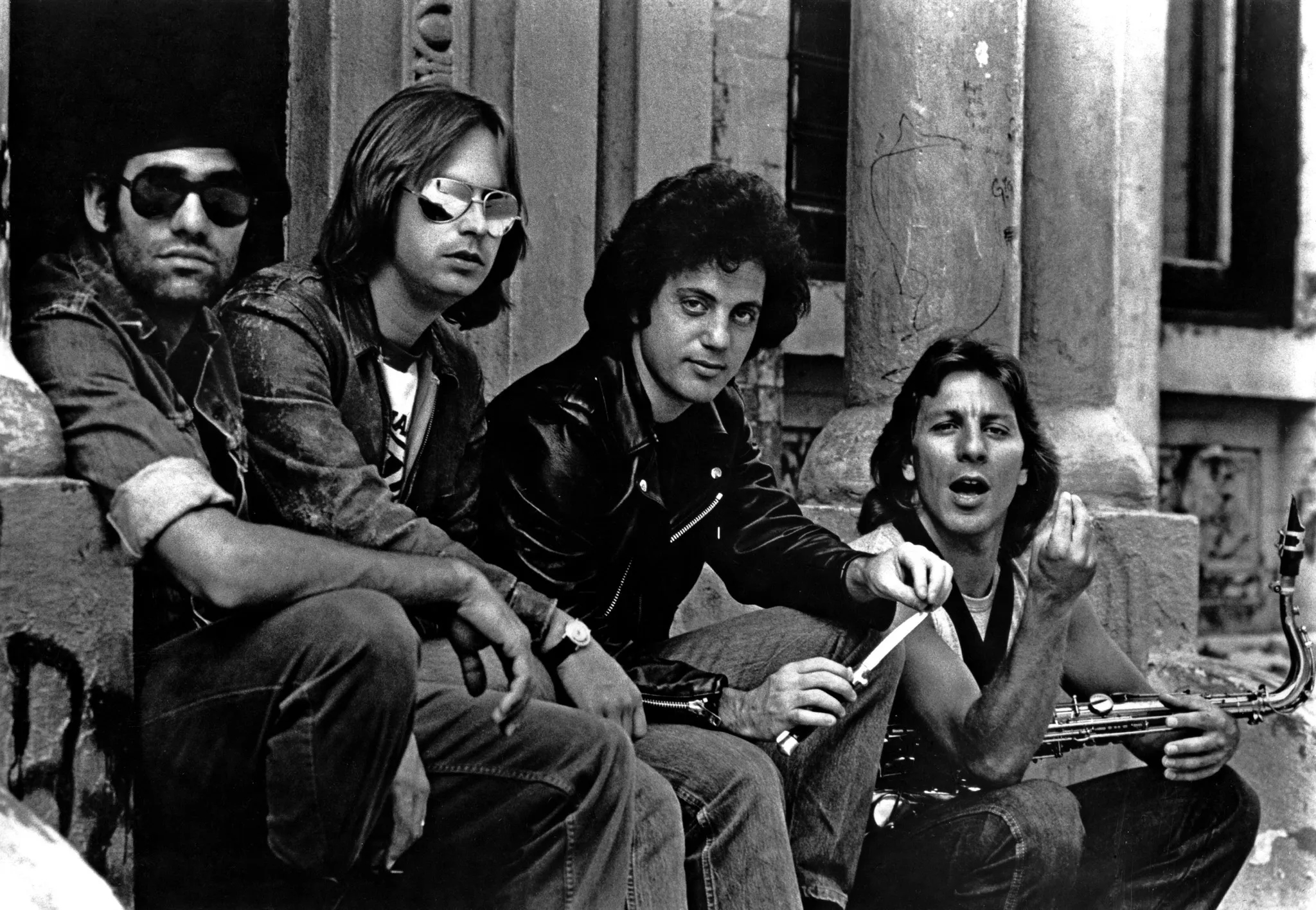
(left to right) Liberty DeVitto, Doug Stegmeyer, Billy Joel and Richie Cannata in a photo promoting 52nd Street (1978)

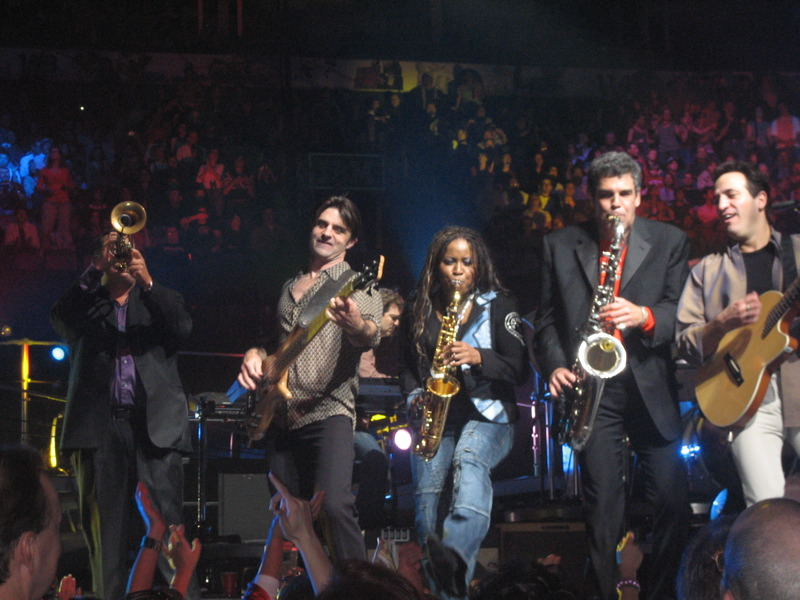
(left to right) Carl Fischer, Andy Cichon, David Rosenthal (background), Crystal Taliefero, Mark Rivera and Tommy Byrnes performing in 2007.

Billy Joel is an American singer-songwriter and pianist who has used various musicians both in studio and for live performances. The band began with the recording of his first album as a solo artist in 1971; it stabilized around 1975 and underwent several lineup changes in the late 1980s and early 1990s. Joel's touring band as a whole did not begin playing on his records until he recorded the album Turnstiles in 1976. This line-up included Richie Cannata on saxophones and organ, Liberty DeVitto on drums, Russell Javors and Howie Emerson on guitars, and Doug Stegmeyer on bass.

The band, which now no longer includes any of its original members, is often not recognized as a formal entity, and is instead referred to simply as Billy Joel's band. The Lords of 52nd Street is a band formed by the original band members that previously played with Joel.

== History ==
=== Early days ===
Joel's original touring band, formed in 1971 to support the Cold Spring Harbor album, comprised Rhys Clark on drums, Al Hertzberg on guitar, and Larry Russell on bass. The group toured throughout the United States, including Puerto Rico.

The touring lineup changed and it took a few years for the lineup to stabilize. In an online interview, DeVitto describes how Joel's classic late 1970s-early 1980s band first came together:

Billy and I used to play the same club in Plainview, Long Island, called My House. He was 17 and in a band called The Hassles and I was 16 and in a band called The New Rock Workshop. We would watch each other play and acknowledge each other in passing. In 1974, he was living in Los Angeles and had already released Piano Man and Streetlife Serenade. He used studio musicians for the recording and different guys out on the road. I was playing in a band called Topper with Doug Stegmeyer and he got the gig to play bass with Billy on the "Streetlife" tour. [Billy] told Doug that he wanted to move back to New York and find a permanent band he could record and tour with on a regular basis. Doug recommended me because Billy was looking for a New York-type drummer, aggressive and hard hitting, and the rest is history. The three of us recorded the basic tracks for Turnstiles and we both recommended Russell Javors and Howie Emerson, who played guitars in Topper and with the addition of Richie Cannata on saxophone, the "Billy Joel Band" was born.

By the late 1970s, the touring and studio lineup of Joel's band stabilized and consisted, mostly, of the following musicians:

- Liberty DeVitto – drums, percussion
- Doug Stegmeyer – bass guitar, backing vocals
- Russell Javors – rhythm and lead guitars, harmonica, occasional percussion, backing vocals
- Richie Cannata – saxophones, flute, clarinet, percussion, keyboards
- David Brown – lead guitar, occasional percussion, backing vocals

This was the basic lineup for some of Joel's classic albums of the 1970s and 1980s including Turnstiles, The Stranger, 52nd Street, Glass Houses, and Songs in the Attic.

In 2014, Cannata, DeVitto, and Javors reunited and performed a short set of Joel's songs at the ceremony during which they were inducted into the Long Island Music Hall of Fame (with Stegmeyer, posthumously), primarily for their work with Joel. They officially formed a band, the Lords of 52nd Street, which plays faithful renditions of the original Joel recordings. David Clark of the Joel tribute band Songs in the Attic plays piano and provides lead vocals, Malcolm Gold plays bass, Ken Cino plays guitar, and Doug Kistner plays keyboards in the group.

=== Line-up changes ===
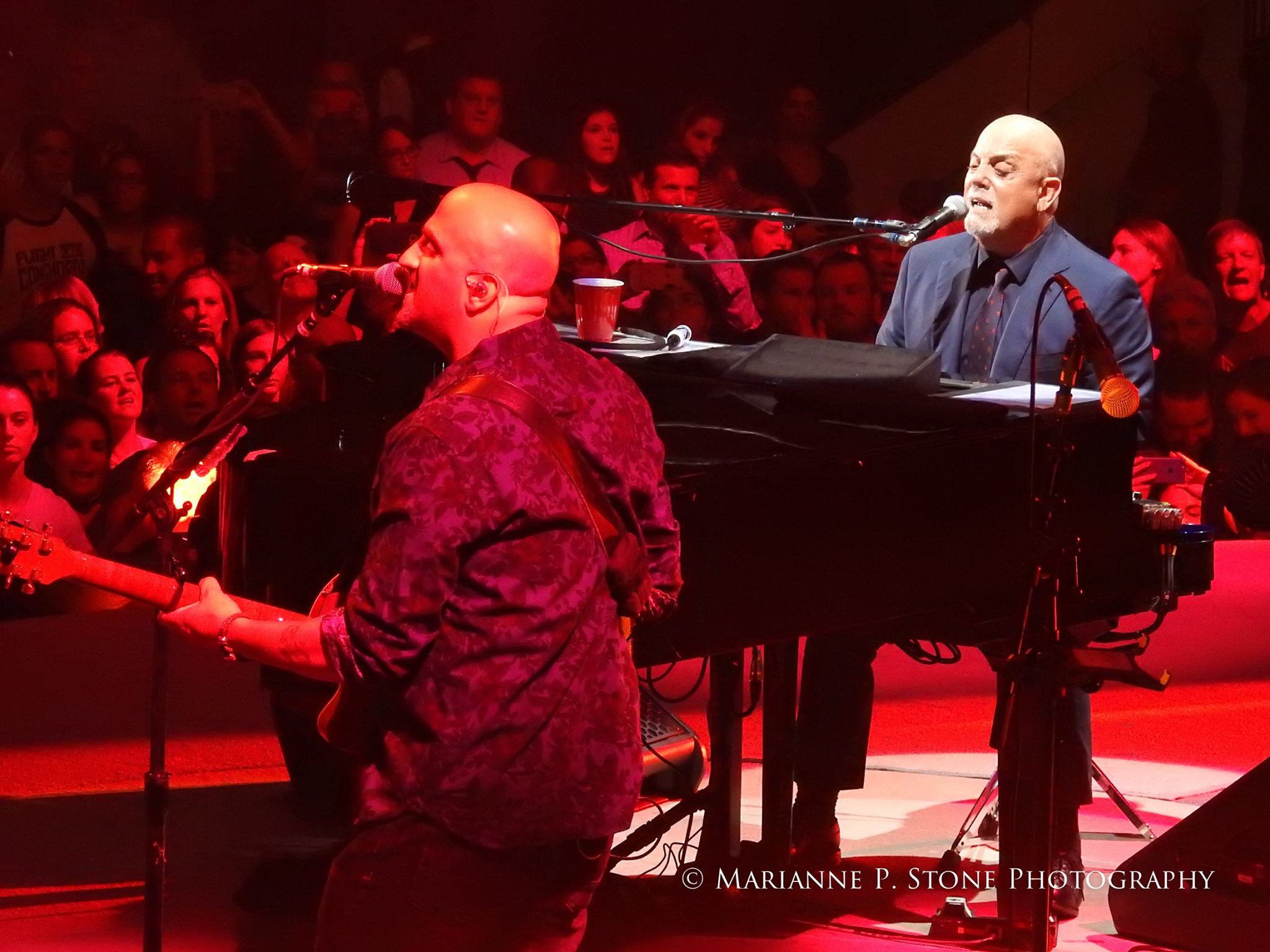
Billy Joel and band member Mike DelGuidice

From The Stranger in 1977 through The Bridge in 1986, Joel had been working with the same producer, Phil Ramone, as well as with the same basic incarnation of the Billy Joel Band (with minor line-up changes over the years). Joel also added lead guitarist David Brown in 1978 who stayed with the band throughout the 1980s, beginning with the recording of Glass Houses (1980). One important addition to the band in 1982 was the replacement of his long-time saxophonist Richie Cannata with Mark Rivera. But for the 1989 album Storm Front, Joel chose a new producer, Mick Jones (of the band Foreigner), and started to make more significant changes to the band. At this point, the only players that Joel kept, for both his touring band and for the recording of the album, were Brown, Rivera, and DeVitto. He also added the percussionist and multi-instrumentalist Crystal Taliefero who would become a permanent fixture in his band while Stegmeyer was replaced by Schuyler Deale and Javors was replaced by Joey Hunting on the album and Tommy Byrnes for its accompanying tour.

For his last studio album, River of Dreams, in 1993, Joel used a new producer again (this time Danny Kortchmar). Although Joel continued to use DeVitto as his main drummer, he allowed Kortchmar to use different drummers for some of the drum tracks. Cannata returned to record some of the sax parts on the record but did not join Joel for the River of Dreams tour that followed.

At this point, the only remaining long-standing member of Joel's touring band was DeVitto. Joel also had Tommy Byrnes move over to lead guitar. He remains at this position and served as both a musical consultant and band member in the Movin' Out musical. Tom "T-Bone" Wolk joined the band, just for the River of Dreams tour, playing bass guitar, as well as other instruments, including accordion. Joel continued to retain Taliefero and Rivera who both remain in his band. The 1993 River of Dreams tour saw the addition of David Rosenthal, formerly of Rainbow, on keyboards.

In August 1995, Joel's long-time bassist Doug Stegmeyer, who had been let go from the band prior to the recording of 1989's Storm Front album, died by suicide in his Long Island home. Stegmeyer had played on every one of Joel's albums from Turnstiles (1976) through to the live album, Kohuept (1987).

For the 2006 tour, Joel did not invite DeVitto back as his drummer after the two became involved in a legal dispute, and the drummer Chuck Burgi (who played in the Broadway production of Movin' Out) replaced DeVitto. For this particular tour, Cannata temporarily returned on lead saxophones though he soon left the band again and Rivera returned to his position as lead saxophonist. In 2006, Carl Fischer joined Joel's band as his trumpeter and trombonist for select songs (most notably for the trumpet solos in the song "Zanzibar").

On February 27, 2010, Joel's bassist from his River of Dreams tour, Tom Wolk, died from a heart attack at the age of 58.

In 2013, the Billy Joel Band was joined by multi-instrumentalist Mike DelGuidice on rhythm guitar and backing vocals. DelGuidice had previously fronted various Billy Joel tribute projects. On August 12, 2024, Liberty DeVitto announced on his Facebook that guitarist David Brown had died.

== Members ==
=== Current members ===
Image	Name	Years active	Instruments	Release contributions
	Billy Joel	1971−present	lead vocals; piano; keyboards; harmonica; occasional rhythm guitar	all releases
	Mark Rivera	1982−present	saxophone; flute; clarinet; vocals; percussion; keyboards; rhythm guitar	An Innocent Man (1983); The Bridge (1986); Kohuept (1987); 2000 Years: The Millennium Concert (2000); 12 Gardens Live (2006); Live at Shea Stadium: The Concert (2011)
	Tommy Byrnes	1989−present	lead guitar (1993−present); rhythm guitar (1989−1993); backing vocals	River of Dreams (1993); 2000 Years: The Millennium Concert (2000); 12 Gardens Live (2006); Live at Shea Stadium: The Concert (2011)
	Crystal Taliefero	1989−present	percussion; vocals; saxophone; rhythm guitar; harmonica	Storm Front (1989); River of Dreams (1993); 2000 Years: The Millennium Concert (2000); 12 Gardens Live (2006); Live at Shea Stadium: The Concert (2011)
	Dave Rosenthal	1993−present	keyboards; backing vocals; musical director	2000 Years: The Millennium Concert (2000); 12 Gardens Live (2006); Live at Shea Stadium: The Concert (2011)
	Andy Cichon	2001−present	bass guitar; backing vocals	12 Gardens Live (2006); Live at Shea Stadium: The Concert (2011)
	Chuck Burgi	2006−present	drums; percussion	12 Gardens Live (2006); Live at Shea Stadium: The Concert (2011)
	Carl Fischer	2006−present	trumpet; flugelhorn; trombone; saxophone; clarinet	12 Gardens Live (2006); Live at Shea Stadium: The Concert (2011)
	Mike DelGuidice	2013−present	rhythm guitar; vocals; piano; bass guitar (occasional sub)	none to date

=== Former members ===
Image	Name	Years active	Instruments	Release contributions
	Rhys Clark	1971−1975	drums	Cold Spring Harbor (1971); Piano Man (1973); Live at the Great American Music Hall 1975 (2023)
	Larry Russell	1971−1973	bass guitar	Piano Man (1973) live tracks only; Streetlife Serenade (1974)
	Al Hertzberg	1971−1973 (died 2020)	guitar	Piano Man (1973) live tracks only; Streetlife Serenade (1974)
	Don Evans	1973−1975	guitar	Cold Spring Harbor (1971); Streetlife Serenade (1974)
	Patrick McDonald	1973−1974	bass guitar	none
	Johnny Almond	1974-1975 (died 2009)	saxophone; keyboards	Live at the Great American Music Hall 1975 (2023)
	Tom Whitehorse	1974	banjo; pedal steel guitar	Streetlife Serenade (1974)
	Doug Stegmeyer	1974−1987 (died 1995)	bass guitar; backing vocals	all releases from Turnstiles (1976) to Kohuept (1987); Live at Carnegie Hall 1977 (2019); Live at the Great American Music Hall 1975 (2023)
	Howard Emerson	1975−1978	lead guitar	Turnstiles (1976); The Stranger (1977) live tracks only; Live at Carnegie Hall 1977 (2019)
	Russell Javors	1975−1987	rhythm and lead guitars; harmonica; occasional percussion; backing vocals	Turnstiles (1976); 52nd Street (1978); Glass Houses (1980); Songs in the Attic (1981); The Nylon Curtain (1982); An Innocent Man (1983); The Bridge (1986); Kohuept (1987)
	Liberty DeVitto	1975−2005	drums; percussion	all releases from Turnstiles (1976) to 2000 Years: The Millennium Concert (2000); Live at Carnegie Hall 1977 (2019)
	Richie Cannata	1975−1981; 2006 (one-off guest appearance in 2000)	saxophones; flute; clarinet; percussion; organ; keyboards; backing vocals	all releases from Turnstiles (1976) to River of Dreams (1993); 2000 Years: The Millennium Concert (2000); 12 Gardens Live (2006); Live at Carnegie Hall 1977 (2019)
	David Brown	1978−1991 (one-off guest appearances in 2000 and 2022) (died 2024)	lead guitar; occasional percussion; backing vocals	all releases from 52nd Street (1978) to Storm Front (1989)
	David Lebolt	1982−1987	keyboards	Kohuept (1987)
	Kevin Dukes	1987 (sub for Brown)	lead guitar	Kohuept (1987)
	Schuyler Deale	1988−1993 (one-off guest appearance in 2022)	bass guitar	Storm Front (1989); River of Dreams (1993)
	Jeff Jacobs	1988−1993	keyboards; backing vocals	Storm Front (1989); River of Dreams (1993)
	Mindy Jostyn	1988−1990 (died 2005)	backing vocals; guitar; violin; keyboards	none
	Tom Wolk	1993−1994 (died 2010)	bass guitar; accordion; mandolin; backing vocals	none
	David Santos	1997−2000	bass guitar	2000 Years: The Millennium Concert (2000)

== Lineups ==
Period	Members	Releases
1971 – 1973	Billy Joel – vocals, piano, keyboards, harmonica; Al Hertzberg – guitar; Larry Russell – bass guitar; Rhys Clark – drums	Cold Spring Harbor (1971) Joel and Clark only; Piano Man (1973) live tracks only
1973 – 1974	Billy Joel – vocals, piano, keyboards, harmonica; Rhys Clark – drums; Don Evans – guitar; Patrick McDonald – bass	Piano Man (1973) Joel and Clark only
1974	Billy Joel – vocals, piano, keyboards, harmonica; Rhys Clark – drums; Don Evans – guitar; Doug Stegmeyer – bass; Tom Whitehorse – banjo, pedal steel guitar; Johnny Almond – saxophone, keyboards	Streetlife Serenade (1974) Joel, Evans and Whitehorse only
1974	Billy Joel – vocals, piano, keyboards, harmonica; Rhys Clark – drums; Don Evans – guitar; Doug Stegmeyer – bass; Johnny Almond – saxophone, keyboards	Live at the Great American Music Hall 1975 (2023)
1975	Billy Joel – vocals, piano, keyboards, harmonica; Doug Stegmeyer – bass, backing vocals; Howard Emerson – lead guitar; Liberty DeVitto – drums, percussion; Richie Cannata – saxophone, flute, clarinet, percussion, keyboards, organ, backing vocals	Live at Carnegie Hall 1977 (2019)
1975 – 1978	Billy Joel – vocals, piano, keyboards, harmonica; Doug Stegmeyer – bass, backing vocals; Howard Emerson – lead guitar; Liberty DeVitto – drums, percussion; Richie Cannata – saxophone, flute, clarinet, percussion, keyboards, organ, backing vocals; Russell Javors – rhythm guitar, harmonica, backing vocals	Turnstiles (1976); The Stranger (1977)
1978 – 1982	Billy Joel – vocals, piano, keyboards, harmonica; Doug Stegmeyer – bass, backing vocals; Liberty DeVitto – drums, percussion; Richie Cannata – saxophone, flute, clarinet, percussion, keyboards, organ, backing vocals; Russell Javors – rhythm guitar, harmonica, backing vocals; David Brown – lead guitar, backing vocals	52nd Street (1978); Glass Houses (1980); Songs in the Attic (1981); The Nylon Curtain (1982) without Cannata
1982 – 1987	Billy Joel – vocals, piano, keyboards, harmonica; Doug Stegmeyer – bass, backing vocals; Liberty DeVitto – drums, percussion; Russell Javors – rhythm guitar, harmonica, backing vocals; David Brown – lead guitar; David Lebolt – keyboards; Mark Rivera – saxophone, flute, clarinet, vocals, percussion, keyboards, rhythm guitar	An Innocent Man (1983) without Lebolt; The Bridge (1986) without Lebolt
1987	Billy Joel – vocals, piano, keyboards, harmonica; Doug Stegmeyer – bass, backing vocals; Liberty DeVitto – drums, percussion; Russell Javors – rhythm guitar, harmonica, backing vocals; David Lebolt – keyboards; Mark Rivera – saxophone, flute, clarinet, vocals, percussion, keyboards, rhythm guitar; Kevin Dukes – lead guitar	Kohuept (1987)
1988	Billy Joel – vocals, piano, keyboards, harmonica; Liberty DeVitto – drums, percussion; Mark Rivera – saxophone, flute, clarinet, vocals, percussion, keyboards, rhythm guitar; David Brown – lead guitar; Jeff Jacobs – keyboards, backing vocals; Schuyler Deale – bass; Mindy Jostyn – backing vocals, guitar, violin, keyboards	Storm Front (1989) without Jostyn
1989 – 1990	Billy Joel – vocals, piano, keyboards, harmonica; Liberty DeVitto – drums, percussion; Mark Rivera – saxophone, flute, clarinet, vocals, percussion, keyboards, rhythm guitar; David Brown – lead guitar; Jeff Jacobs – keyboards, backing vocals; Schuyler Deale – bass; Mindy Jostyn – backing vocals, guitar, violin, keyboards; Tommy Byrnes – rhythm guitar, backing vocals; Crystal Taliefero – percussion, vocals, saxophone, rhythm guitar, harmonica	none
1990 – 1991	Billy Joel – vocals, piano, keyboards, harmonica; Liberty DeVitto – drums, percussion; Mark Rivera – saxophone, flute, clarinet, vocals, percussion, keyboards, rhythm guitar; David Brown – lead guitar; Jeff Jacobs – keyboards, backing vocals; Schuyler Deale – bass; Tommy Byrnes – rhythm guitar, backing vocals; Crystal Taliefero – percussion, vocals, saxophone, rhythm guitar, harmonica	River of Dreams (1993)
1993 – 1994	Billy Joel – vocals, piano, keyboards, harmonica; Liberty DeVitto – drums, percussion; Mark Rivera – saxophone, flute, clarinet, vocals, percussion, keyboards, rhythm guitar; Tommy Byrnes – lead guitar, backing vocals; Crystal Taliefero – percussion, vocals, saxophone, rhythm guitar, harmonica; David Rosenthal – keyboards, backing vocals; Tom Wolk – bass, accordion, mandolin, backing vocals	none
1997 – 2000	Billy Joel – vocals, piano, keyboards, harmonica; Liberty DeVitto – drums, percussion; Mark Rivera – saxophone, flute, clarinet, vocals, percussion, keyboards, rhythm guitar; Tommy Byrnes – lead guitar, backing vocals; Crystal Taliefero – percussion, vocals, saxophone, rhythm guitar, harmonica; David Rosenthal – keyboards, backing vocals; David Santos – bass	2000 Years: The Millennium Concert (2000)
2001 – 2005	Billy Joel – vocals, piano, keyboards, harmonica; Liberty DeVitto – drums, percussion; Mark Rivera – saxophone, flute, clarinet, vocals, percussion, keyboards, rhythm guitar; Tommy Byrnes – lead guitar, backing vocals; Crystal Taliefero – percussion, vocals, saxophone, rhythm guitar, harmonica; David Rosenthal – keyboards, backing vocals; Andy Cichon – bass, backing vocals	none
2006	Billy Joel – vocals, piano, keyboards, harmonica; Mark Rivera – saxophone, flute, clarinet, vocals, percussion, keyboards, rhythm guitar; Tommy Byrnes – lead guitar, backing vocals; Crystal Taliefero – percussion, vocals, saxophone, rhythm guitar, harmonica; David Rosenthal – keyboards, backing vocals; Andy Cichon – bass, backing vocals; Chuck Burgi – drums, percussion; Richie Cannata – saxophone, percussion; Carl Fischer – trumpet, flugelhorn, trombone, saxophone, clarinet	12 Gardens Live (2006)
2006 – 2013	Billy Joel – vocals, piano, keyboards, harmonica; Mark Rivera – saxophone, flute, clarinet, vocals, percussion, keyboards, rhythm guitar; Tommy Byrnes – lead guitar, backing vocals; Crystal Taliefero – percussion, vocals, saxophone, rhythm guitar, harmonica; David Rosenthal – keyboards, backing vocals; Andy Cichon – bass, backing vocals; Chuck Burgi – drums, percussion; Carl Fischer – trumpet, flugelhorn, trombone, saxophone, clarinet	Live at Shea Stadium: The Concert (2011)
2013 – present	Billy Joel – vocals, piano, keyboards, harmonica; Mark Rivera – saxophone, flute, clarinet, vocals, percussion, keyboards, rhythm guitar; Tommy Byrnes – lead guitar, backing vocals; Crystal Taliefero – percussion, vocals, saxophone, rhythm guitar, harmonica; David Rosenthal – keyboards, backing vocals; Andy Cichon – bass, backing vocals; Chuck Burgi – drums, percussion; Carl Fischer – trumpet, flugelhorn, trombone, saxophone, clarinet; Mike DelGuidice – rhythm guitar, vocals, piano	none to date
