= Laura (Billy Joel song) =

Song by Billy Joel

Song by Billy Joel

from the album The Nylon Curtain
- A-side: "Pressure"
- Released: September 23, 1982
- Recorded: Spring 1982
- Studio: A&R, New York City; Mediasound, New York City
- Genre: Rock; new wave
- Length: 5:05
- Label: Columbia
- Songwriter: Billy Joel
- Producer: Phil Ramone

"Laura" is a song written by Billy Joel, and first released on his 1982 album The Nylon Curtain.

A live version of the song, recorded at Madison Square Garden in New York, was included as the final track on disc one of the double CD 12 Gardens Live (2006).

== Lyrics and music ==
Producer of The Nylon Curtain, Phil Ramone, described "Laura" and two other songs from the album ("Scandinavian Skies" and "Where's the Orchestra?") as "philosophical and dark". Written in the first person, the lyrics depict the singer as being co-dependent on a woman named Laura. Musicologist Walter Everett describes Laura as being "an aggressive woman who traumatizes the singer." He can't resist taking her phone calls, even though he knows she is trouble and that his efforts to help will only lead to more problems. She calls him in the middle of the night and pushes his emotional buttons. According to music critic Mark Bego, Laura appears to be a friend, as the lyrics such as "Living alone isn't all that it's cracked up to be" seem to imply that the singer is reflecting on how his "newfound bachelorhood isn't as much fun as he had hoped it to be." In his frustration with Laura, Joel inserts an f-bomb into the lyrics, surprising listeners who regarded Joel simply as a balladeer. Essayist Chuck Klosterman interpreted the lyrics as Laura "is slowly killing the narrator by refusing to end a relationship that is clearly over. Klosterman interpreted the song as being sung by a narrator who is not intended to be Billy Joel himself who has a life that seems to be perfect even though he harbors a dark secret in his emotionally "exhausting" relationship with Laura, who may be an ex-wife.

At the time of its release, Joel stated that "Laura" was not about his ex-wife or a girlfriend, but rather "the guilt you get from someone in your family who knows just how to stick the knife in and wear you down." He went on to generalize the theme by stating that "You'd be surprised how many people have a destructive relationship and don't know it. Nobody has a right to do that to you; it's against the law." In 2006, Joel's drummer Liberty DeVitto disclosed that the song was actually about the singer's mother, Rosalind, suggesting that the title was chosen because like the word "mother", it is disyllabic. According to Klosterman, Joel confirmed the fact that "Laura" was about his mother in an interview with him, and that Joel noted in the interview that the line in the song "How can she hold an umbilical cord for so long" should have been a giveaway. Joel later stated that he "must have been pretty fed up with some of [his] own mother's manipulation by the time [he] wrote the song, as evidenced by the F-word in the lyrics."

The music of "Laura" contains Beatle-esque elements. Dave Lifton of Ultimate Classic Rock states that the verses sound like John Lennon while the refrain sounds like Paul McCartney, comparing the song to the Beatles' "I've Got a Feeling." Bego claims that the music lies somewhere between Lennon's "Dear Prudence" and McCartney's "Maxwell's Silver Hammer." Author Ken Bielen describes "Laura" as "an unabashed tribute to the Beatles" claiming that the vocals sound similar to the Beatles, the lead guitar sounds similar to George Harrison's, the drumming sounds similar to Ringo Starr's and even the string instruments sound like George Martin's arrangements for the Beatles. Joel acknowledged the Beatle influence on the "la la's and the guitar break." He also suggested that he may not have been able to write "Laura" if he "hadn't first heard how deep John [Lennon] went with his song 'Mother.'"

== Critical reception ==
Allmusic critic Stephen Thomas Erlewine rated "Laura" as part of an opening "song suite" to The Nylon Curtain that is "layered, successful, mature pop that brings Joel tantalizingly close to his ultimate goal of sophisticated pop/rock for mature audiences." Klosterman views "Laura" as a song that is as good as much of what is on the Beatles' White Album and that "warrant[s] a complete reinvention of how hipsters should look at Joel as a spokesman for the disaffection of success." Jazz guitarist John Pizzarelli rated "Laura" among his "favorite things." Ultimate Classic Rock critic Dave Lifton rated "Laura" as Joel's 8th best love song, saying that it "perfectly captures the erotic torment that comes with being involved with a woman who you know is no good for you." Although Stephen Holden's review of The Nylon Curtain in Rolling Stone was generally positive, he noted that "the album's only clinker is the venomous 'Laura,' which mines the same vein of misogyny as 'Stiletto'" (52nd Street, 1978). Two months later, however, he wrote in the New York Times that the song "clinically details the way a parent can instill a child with guilt". Everett writes about how Joel uses a more "freely vernacular" tonal language than in other songs in order to express his views about the subject of the song.
