= The Lords of 52nd Street =

American rock band

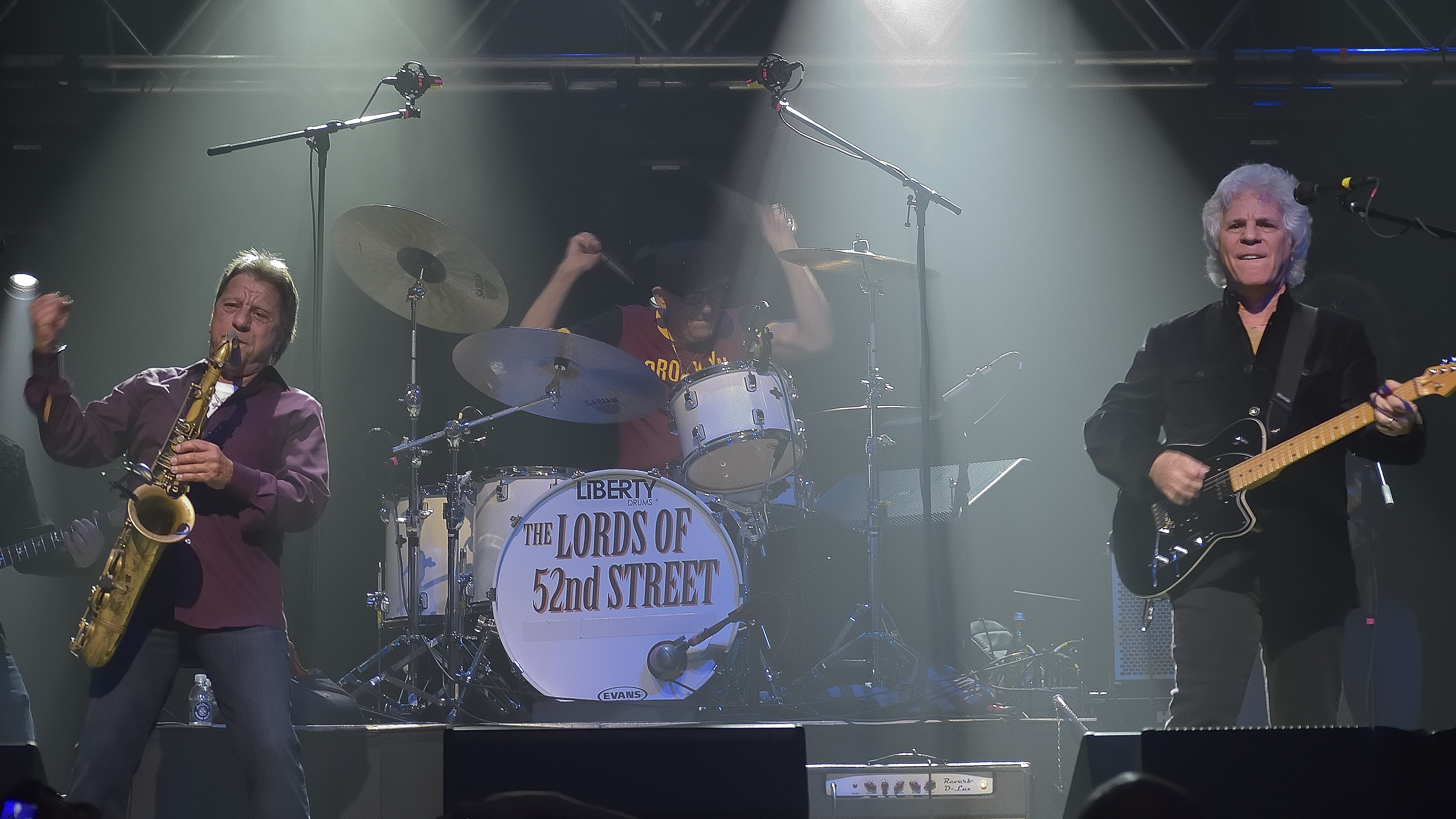

Background information
- Genres: Rock, rock and roll, soft rock, pop rock, pop
- Years active: 2014–present
- Members: Richie Cannata; Liberty DeVitto; Russell Javors; Doug Kistner; Malcolm Gold; Dan Orlando; Anthony Babino
- Past members: David Clark; Ken Cino; Dennis DelGaudio
- Website: www.lordsof52ndst.com

The Lords of 52nd Street is an American rock band that primarily comprises members of the line-up which backed singer-songwriter Billy Joel from 1976 to 1981, the period during which Joel initiated a run of albums that reached the top ten on the Billboard charts.

== Composition ==
The band is led by three former members of the Billy Joel Band: multi-instrumentalist Richie Cannata, drummer/percussionist Liberty DeVitto, and guitarist Russell Javors. Dan Orlando mans the piano and provides lead vocals, Malcolm Gold plays bass in place of the late Doug Stegmeyer, Dennis DelGaudio plays guitar and Doug Kistner plays keyboards in the group.

== History ==
Cannata, DeVitto, Javors, and the late bassist Doug Stegmeyer composed the core Joel recording and touring band from 1976 (when the Turnstiles album was recorded) until 1981 (after the end of the Glass Houses tour), save for Javors' absence from the recording of The Stranger in 1977. (Cannata stayed until 1981, returning for the River of Dreams recording sessions in 1993. Javors and Stegmeyer remained until 1988 and DeVitto stayed until 2006.)

Four of the five Joel albums released during the foursome's 1976-1981 tenure reached the top ten on the Billboard charts: The Stranger, 52nd Street, Glass Houses, and the live Songs in the Attic. All four albums were produced by Phil Ramone and all four were critically acclaimed.

The late Ramone wrote that the "Lords" nickname developed during the recording of 52nd Street in 1978. Because the album had a jazz mood–Manhattan's 52nd Street had been the center of New York City's jazz scene in the mid-Twentieth Century–it featured an "all-star" line-up of jazz soloists as guest artists. The guests and Joel's band clicked so well during the recording sessions that the group garnered the nickname "The Lords of 52nd Street" from Ramone. The video for the 52nd Street track "My Life" has shots of Cannata, DeVitto, Joel, and Stegmeyer strutting down Manhattan streets together on their way to their recording studio on the titular street. DeVitto has stated that jackets were even made to cement the identity, but the "Lords" name was not formalized while the group was working directly with Joel.

The Lords of 52nd Street's status as an official group was established after Cannata, DeVitto, and Javors reunited at the October 23, 2014 ceremony in which they (with Stegmeyer, posthumously) were inducted into the Long Island Music Hall of Fame, primarily for their work with Joel. During the ceremony, the three performed a short set of Joel hits that they had helped create. The performance included the songs "Scenes from an Italian Restaurant" (from The Stranger), "Miami 2017 (Seen the Lights Go Out on Broadway)" (from Turnstiles), and "You May Be Right" (from Glass Houses). It was the first time in more than 25 years that the three had shared a stage to perform from Joel's catalogue.

== Touring ==
The band continues to perform, playing faithful renditions of the recorded originals. Although delayed by Cannata's 2015 diagnosis with lymphoma (from which he is in remission), a tour began in February 2016, opening at The Space in Westbury, New York.
