= The Nylon Curtain =

Studio album by Billy Joel
- Released: September 23, 1982
- Recorded: Winter 1981–spring 1982
- Studios: A&R, New York City; Mediasound, New York City
- Genres: Pop rock; rock
- Length: 41:57
- Label: Family Productions/Columbia
- Producer: Phil Ramone

Billy Joel chronology
Songs in the Attic (1981)	The Nylon Curtain (1982)	An Innocent Man (1983)

Singles from The Nylon Curtain
- 1. "Pressure" Released: September 1982; 2. "Allentown" Released: November 1982; 3. "Goodnight Saigon" Released: February 1983

Professional ratings
Review scores
Source	Rating
AllMusic	3.5/5 stars
Christgau's Record Guide: The '80s	B
People	(Positive)
Rolling Stone	4/5 stars

The Nylon Curtain is the eighth studio album by American singer-songwriter Billy Joel, released on September 23, 1982, and produced by Phil Ramone.

The Nylon Curtain peaked at No. 7 on the Billboard albums chart, with two million sales in the U.S.

== Background ==
The album is among Joel's most ambitious efforts. Joel has called it "the recording I'm most proud of and the material I'm most proud of." When he recorded the album, he said in an interview, he aimed to "create a sonic masterpiece". Joel spent more time in the studio, crafting the sound of the album, than he had on any previous album a process he said was "exhausting". Critics have interpreted the album to be, in part, an homage to the music of the Beatles and the then-recently deceased John Lennon.

Saxophonist/multi-instrumentalist Richie Cannata left the band before recording, so Joel, bassist Doug Stegmeyer, drummer Liberty DeVitto and guitarists David Brown and Russell Javors recorded the album mostly by themselves, thus making it Joel's first album since Streetlife Serenade not to feature a regular saxophonist, although Eddie Daniels plays clarinet on the closing track "Where's the Orchestra?" alongside Charles McCracken on cello and Dominic Cortese on accordion. Saxophonist/multi-instrumentalist Mark Rivera, formerly of the band Tycoon, joined the band on The Nylon Curtain Tour.

Regarding the album's themes, Joel has stated, "It was during the Reagan years, and the diminishing horizons in America at the time [meant that] all of a sudden you weren't going to be able to inherit [the kind of life] your old man had." This pessimism about the American dream, in Joel's view, permeates most of the songs on the album. Joel also said that the theme of the album was "an American dilemma, specifically of people born after World War II." He said that although he doesn't provide solutions to the dilemma, he "hope[d] the record speaks like someone in that age group, if only just to tie us all together as people, as an entity".

Pop-culture journalist Chuck Klosterman praised songs from the album, specifically "Laura" and "Where's the Orchestra?", in his book Sex, Drugs, and Cocoa Puffs.

== Production ==
Joel said in an interview that most of the songs on the album were written in the same sequence in which they appear on the album. The album's production schedule was slightly thrown off near the end of production because Joel had a motorcycle accident.

The album opens with "Allentown", which is actually about the nearby town of Bethlehem, Pennsylvania. Bethlehem, largely based in the production of steel for automobiles, was experiencing economic difficulties amid the early 1980s recession that affected the steel industry. Joel wrote the melody for "Allentown" eight years before he completed the lyrics for inclusion on The Nylon Curtain.

According to Joel, the titular character from the song "Laura" was supposed to represent anyone who knows how to "push your buttons" and make you feel guilty. He also said that the character, despite having the female-oriented name "Laura", could represent anybody, regardless of sex.

"Pressure" is about reaching a certain age and realizing one's real-life responsibilities. The song was recorded with eight overdubbed synthesizer tracks, as well as a segment with four people playing the mandolin.

The closing song to Side A, "Goodnight Saigon", is about American Marines fighting in the Vietnam War, and was written by Joel at the request of his veteran peers who fought during the war. Joel wanted to avoid creating a political song that took sides, instead opting to describe things from the soldiers' point-of-view in the midst of the action. Joel, who described himself as a draft dodger in an interview, had several peers who fought in the war, some of whom never returned, and received input from many of his friends who had served in the army in order to accurately depict what it was like being stationed in Vietnam. The song opens and closes with the sound of the rotors on a Bell UH-1 Iroquois (or "Huey"), a military helicopter that was heavily used during the Vietnam War.

The B-side of The Nylon Curtain opens with "She's Right on Time", an uplifting love song, to contrast with the more serious tone of the preceding "Goodnight Saigon". The song details the anticipated reunion between two lovers, told from the point of view of the man in the relationship waiting for the woman to arrive. Since the song was written by Joel around Christmas time, the preparation of a Christmas tree was used as an analogy throughout the song.

"A Room of Our Own" thematically opposes "She's Right on Time", detailing a couple who needs time away from each other; the song lays out differences between the two.

The song "Surprises", described by Joel as a "grand metaphysical statement", is about how one shouldn't be surprised by their inability to control things, though he said the song is open to several interpretations.

The first three songs on side B all display a relationship theme. “She’s Right On Time” describing the reunion, “A Room Of Our Own” describing the decline as the lovers drift apart, and “Surprises” with the inevitable separation.

"Scandinavian Skies", which prominently features string parts inspired by the Beatles songs "I Am The Walrus" and "Strawberry Fields Forever", was inspired by a horrifying drug experience Joel went through during a flight.

The closing song, "Where's The Orchestra?", is about a man who goes to see a live play expecting a musical, only to realize that it's a regular stage show; according to Joel, this is a metaphor for life, specifically the realization that it's not as grand and over-the-top as it is sometimes made out to be. Joel tried to make the song feel reminiscent of musical plays. In the studio recording, Joel's vocals play from the left speaker channel, whereas the orchestral backing is in the right speaker channel, to emulate a man sitting in a theater seat and watching a play. The song closes by reprising the melody of "Allentown", thus bringing the album full circle.

== Accolades ==
=== Grammy Awards ===
Year	Nominee / work	Award	Result
1983	The Nylon Curtain	Album of the Year	Nominated

== Track listing ==
All tracks are written by Billy Joel.

Side one
No.	Title	Length
1.	"Allentown"	3:52
2.	"Laura"	5:05
3.	"Pressure"	4:40
4.	"Goodnight Saigon"	7:04

Side two
No.	Title	Length
5.	"She's Right on Time"	4:14
6.	"A Room of Our Own"	4:04
7.	"Surprises"	3:26
8.	"Scandinavian Skies"	6:00
9.	"Where's the Orchestra?"	3:17
Total length:		41:57

== Personnel ==
=== Musicians ===
- Billy Joel – vocals, piano, electric piano, synthesizers, Hammond organ, melodica, Prophet-5 synthesizer, Synclavier II (3), acoustic guitar (1)
- David Brown – electric and acoustic guitar (lead)
- Russell Javors – electric and acoustic guitar (rhythm)
- Doug Stegmeyer – bass
- Liberty DeVitto – drums, percussion

==== Additional musicians ====
- Dave Grusin – string and horn arrangements
- David Nadien – concertmaster (1, 3–7, 9)
- "String Fever" – strings (2, 8)
- Bill Zampino – field snare (4)
- Rob Mounsey – synthesizer (8)
- Dominic Cortese – accordion (9)
- Charles McCracken – cello (9)
- Eddie Daniels – saxophone and clarinet (9)

=== Technical ===
- Produced by Phil Ramone
- Engineered by Jim Boyer
- Associate engineer – Bradshaw Leigh
- Assistant engineers – Larry Franke, Andy Hoffman, and Michael Christopher
- Remixed by Jim Boyer at A&R Recording, New York
- Production assistant – Laura Loncteaux
- Production manager – Kenneth Topolsky
- Mastered by Ted Jensen at Sterling Sound, New York
- Front cover design – Chris Austopchuk
- Back cover photo – Benno Friedman
- Album art coordination – Paula Scher
- Inner sleeve design – John Berg
- Management – Frank Management Inc.

== Charts ==
=== Weekly charts ===
Chart (1982–83)	Peak position
Australia (Kent Music Report)	4
Austrian Albums (Ö3 Austria Top 40)	20
Canadian Albums (RPM)	12
Danish Albums (IFPI)	9
Dutch Albums (MegaCharts)	1
Icelandic Albums (Tónlist)	6
Japanese Albums (Oricon)	2
New Zealand Albums (RIANZ)	10
Norwegian Albums (VG-lista)	9
Swedish Albums (Sverigetopplistan)	31
UK Albums (OCC)	27
US Billboard 200	7
West German Albums (Media Control)	34

=== Year-end charts ===
Chart (1982)	Position
Australian Albums Chart	49
Canadian Albums Chart	77
Japanese Albums Chart (Oricon)	48
Norwegian Albums Chart (Høst Period)	20
Chart (1983)	Position
Australian Albums Chart	82
Canadian Albums Chart	78
Dutch Albums Chart	12
Japanese Albums Chart	58
US Billboard Year-end	33

== Certifications and sales ==
Region	Certification	Certified units/sales
Australia (ARIA)	Platinum	50,000^{^}
Canada (Music Canada)	Platinum	100,000^{^}
Japan (Oricon Charts)	—	356,000
Netherlands (NVPI)	Gold	50,000^{^}
United States (RIAA)	2× Platinum	2,000,000^{^}
^{^} Shipments figures based on certification alone.
