= The Sean J. Kennedy Quartet =

- Also known as: SJK4
- Origin: Philadelphia
- Years active: 2000–present
- Members: Sean J. Kennedy; Erin Stroup; John Stenger; Mark Amentt
- Past members: Raymond Clemens; Jim Sullivan

The Sean J. Kennedy Quartet is an American Jazz group based in Philadelphia, Pennsylvania.

== Discography ==
Road to Wailea
Queen Anne's Revenge
Outta' Here!
Hey! Where's My Tux?!

== Members ==
Sean J. Kennedy, Drums, Primary Artist, Producer
Erin Stroup, Saxophone, Composer
John Stenger, Piano
Mark Amentt, Bass

== Guest Artists ==
Liberty DeVitto, Drums
Tim Price, Saxophone
Dave Champion, Trombone
Bob Wagner, Trumpet
Bob Mintzer, Tenor Saxophone
Larry McKenna, Tenor Saxophone
Gary Zimarro, Saxophone and Flute

== Former members ==
Jim Sullivan, Piano
Raymond Clemens, Bass
