= Mike DelGuidice =

American musician associated with Billy Joel

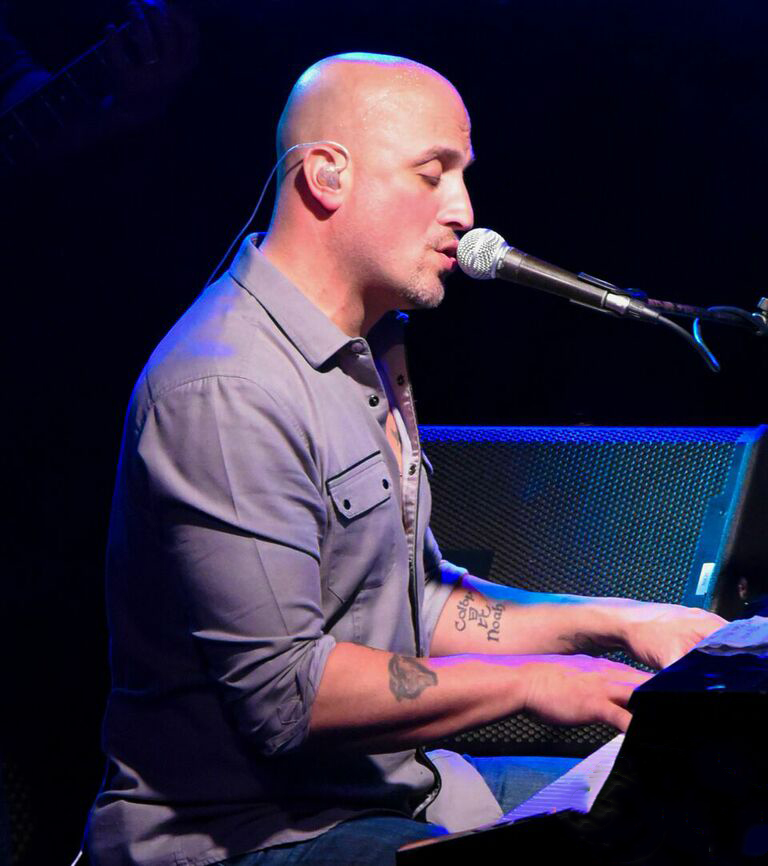
- DelGuidice playing piano and vocals

Background information
- Born: Michael DelGuidice
- Origin: Long Island, New York, U.S.
- Occupation: Musician
- Instruments: Vocals; piano; guitar
- Years active: 2000–present
- Member of: Billy Joel Band; Big Shot
- Website: bigshottributeband.com

Michael DelGuidice is an American musician, best known as rhythm guitarist and vocalist of Billy Joel's band, and as the lead vocalist and pianist for the Long Island band Big Shot. He had played 15 years as a Billy Joel cover artist and later joined Joel's band at Joel's invitation in 2013.

== Early life ==
During DelGuidice's childhood, his mother listened to Barbra Streisand music, and his father listened to Billy Joel and Chicago. He was 13 years old when he first started playing Joel's music. He grew up on the North Shore, where he spent a lot of time watching Joel's Live from Long Island concert video and hanging out in the music room at Miller Place High School where he practiced the songs of Joel, Elton John and Paul McCartney. DelGuidice required seven surgeries to address a congenital kidney condition when he was a child.

== Career ==
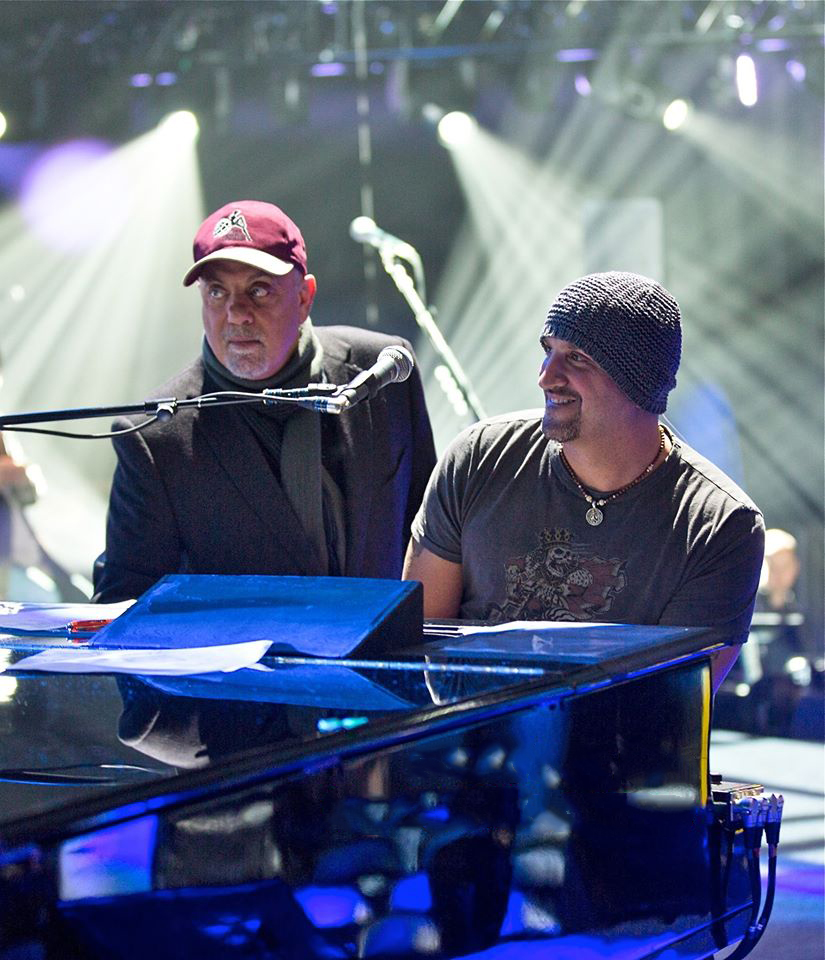
DelGuidice (right) with his idol, Billy Joel

DelGuidice started his music career performing in Long Island piano bars and saloons. He started singing songs of Billy Joel in Miller Place High School's vocal jazz band in the late 1980s.

He struggled for many years to pay the bills pushing and performing his original music and finally releasing 2 music albums, Miller Place and My Street.

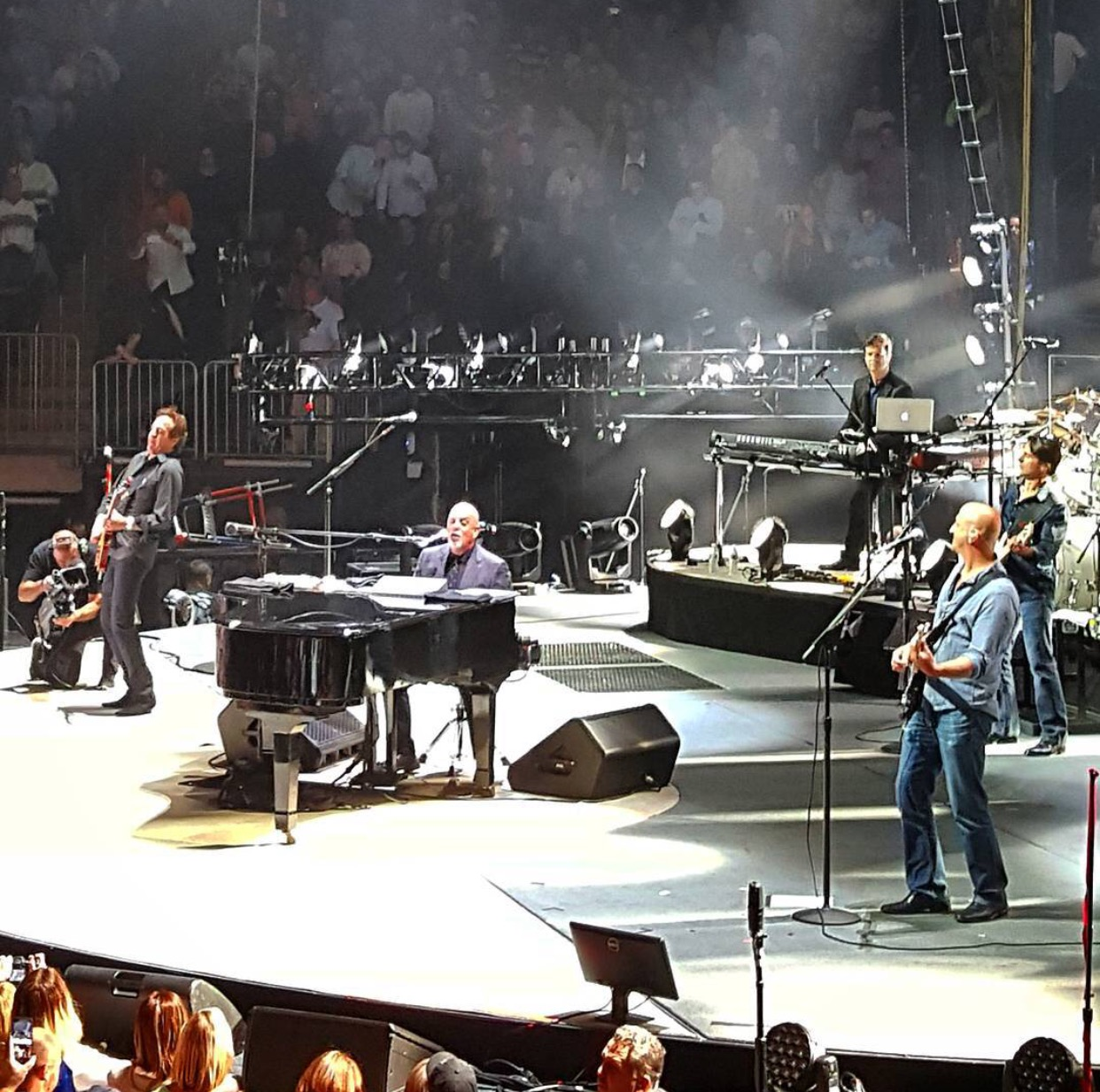
DelGuidice performing with Billy Joel Band

In 2000, DelGuidice started the band Big Shot, which is a tribute to the music of Billy Joel. Big Shot played their first gig at the Village Pub in Port Jefferson in the same year. With DelGuidice on lead vocals and piano, it drew big crowds from the start. By 2011, some of Big Shot's members were burnt out from playing over 100 gigs a year. DelGuidice's solution was to call Joel's long-time lead guitarist, Tommy Byrnes. Byrnes and Joel's drummer since 2005, Chuck Burgi joined regular bassist Nick Dimichino, keyboardist Carmine Giglio and saxophonist John Scarpulla in filling out Big Shot's lineup and DelGuidice continued to sing in concerts. Having Joel's band members Byrnes and Burgi in Big Shot in 2011 started the progression into the whole process of getting DelGuidice involved with Joel's band.

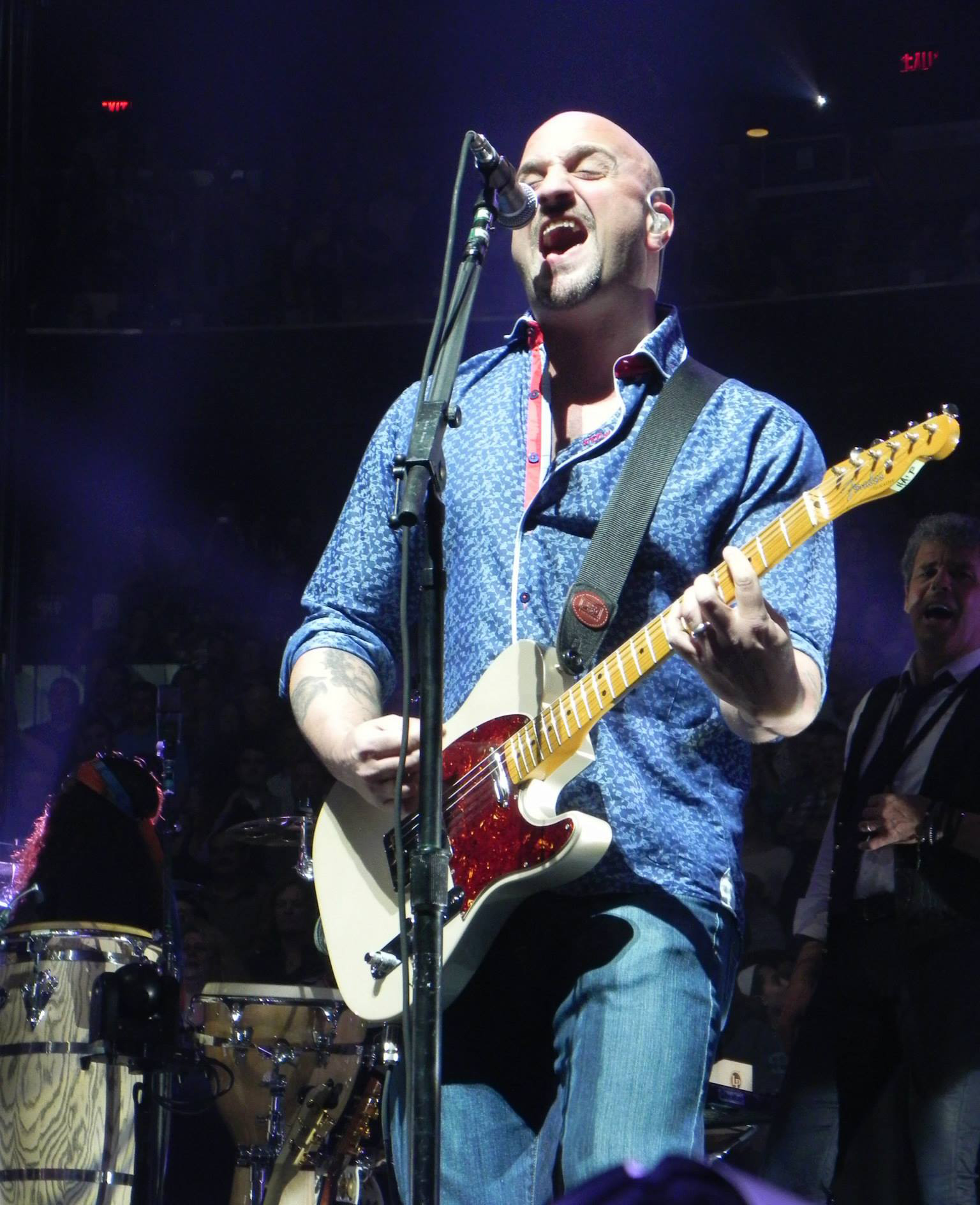
DelGuidice in vocal and rhythm guitar

DelGuidice also writes his own music for his songs. On August 4, 2015, DelGuidice was the opening act for Joel's closing concert at Long Island's Nassau Veterans Memorial Coliseum in Uniondale. Comedian Kevin James came out that night to play "Miami 2017". Months later, James texted DelGuidice to see if he had a song they could use as the theme to his CBS show Kevin Can Wait, DelGuidice sent over "Ordinary Guy", a tune he wrote for a 2011 reality show about tribute bands that never made it to air. James accepted the song for his show and was shot in Bethpage.

On October 15, 2013, Joel came to listen to the rehearsal of DelGuidice at the Paramount Theater in Huntington. After noticing the dedication to Joel's music, DelGuidice was asked by Joel himself to join his European tour of that year.

In 2013, DelGuidice joined the Billy Joel Band playing rhythm guitar and vocals.

On June 24, 2016, DelGuidice performed with Big Shot at the Paramount Theatre in Huntington. Joel appeared at the show as a surprise guest.

On July 28, 2016, Big Shot teamed up with the Suffolk County Police Department to raise money through a concert named "Help Stop The Long Island Heroin Epidemic" at the Emporium in Patchogue, New York.

On August 9, 2016, DelGuidice performed the opera classic "Nessun dorma" for the first time with Joel at Madison Square Garden. Their second performance of the song there was held on October 28, 2016.. He performed the song once again with Joel at Madison Square Garden during a sold out performance on 11 July 2019.

DelGuidice and John Mongiardo are working to release "Victoria's Song", an unreleased song by Doug Stegmeyer, a member of Joel's band who died by suicide in 1995.

== Personal life ==
DelGuidice lives in Bradenton, FL as of 2019. He has four children.
