= Sean J. Kennedy =

American musician & Educator

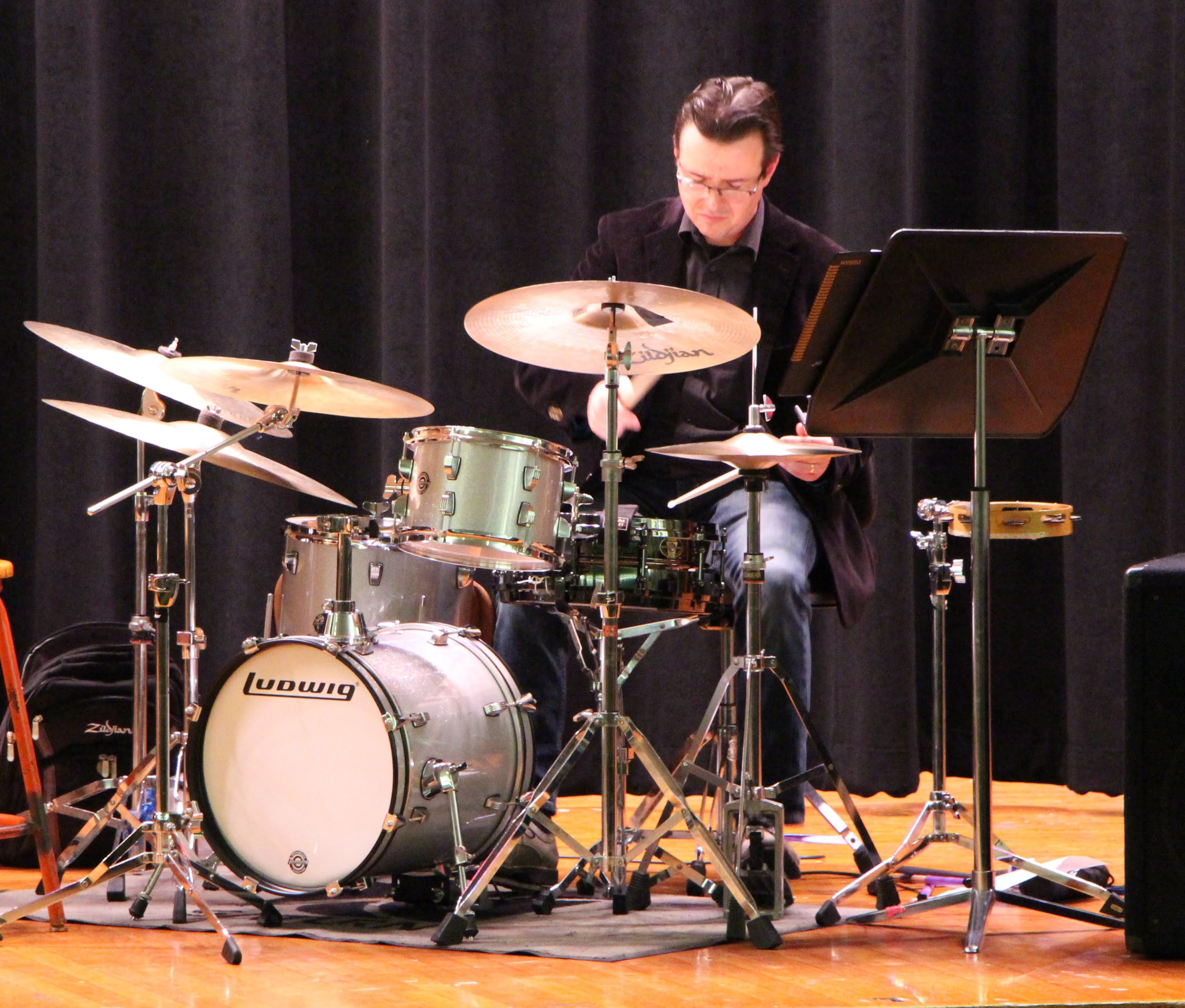
- Kennedy in 2018

Background information
- Born: Sean J. Kennedy; September 20, 1971 (age 54); Philadelphia, Pennsylvania, U.S.
- Genres: Jazz, rock, classical
- Occupations: Percussionist, author, Adjunct professor, educator
- Instruments: Drum set, percussion
- Years active: 1980s–present
- Website: seanjkennedy.com

Sean J. Kennedy (born September 20, 1971) is an American drum set player, percussionist, author, and educator. He is the principal percussionist for the Philadelphia Boys Choir & Chorale, a core member of the Gardyn Jazz Orchestra, and the drummer for the Doc Severinsen Tribute Band. A member of the Percussive Arts Society Drum Set Committee, Kennedy is recognized for his work across jazz, rock, and classical genres, having performed as a touring percussionist and drummer for major acts.

== Education ==
Kennedy earned a Bachelor of Science in Music Education and a Master of Music in Percussion Performance from West Chester University. In 2026, he completed a Doctor of Arts in Music at William Carey University, where his research specialized in jazz drum set performance and history.

== Career ==
=== Performance and touring ===
Since 2004, Kennedy has served as the principal percussionist for the Philadelphia Boys Choir & Chorale. Kennedy’s original orchestral composition, "Kaku, kupala | Fear in Neutral Buoyancy," premiered at Carnegie Hall on September 27, 2015. In 2018, his commissioned choral piece "Lux Contritum (Broken Light)" debuted at Kimmel Center's Verizon Hall.

Kennedy is the drummer for the Doc Severinsen Tribute Band and a core member of the Gardyn Jazz Orchestra. As a touring artist, he has performed on Northeastern US tour legs as a percussionist and drummer for major acts including Roger Daltrey of The Who, Warren Haynes (Jerry Garcia Symphonic Celebration), Evanescence, and Lindsey Stirling. He also performed on the "Notte Magica" and "Sings Morricone" world tours with the Italian trio Il Volo.

His performance credits include appearances at Radio City Music Hall, the Kennedy Center, and Lincoln Center. In 2018, he appeared as a background actor in the film Creed II, and has performed live on ABC’s Good Morning America.

=== The Rolling Buzzards Brigade ===
In 2020, Kennedy founded The Rolling Buzzards Brigade, an ensemble focused on modern interpretations of 18th-century military and patriotic music. The project features collaborations with Dame Evelyn Glennie, Bernie Dresel, Clayton Cameron, and Neil Grover. The group has been featured in Modern Drummer, International Musician, and broadcast on WWFM and WLRH.

=== Media and pedagogy ===
Kennedy is an adjunct professor of drum set, percussion, and jazz at Arcadia University. He also teaches within the Upper Dublin and Wissahickon school districts. In 2018, he delivered a TEDx talk titled "Happy Accidents: Drumming Up Serendipity" at TEDxWilmington.

Since 2016, he has hosted the music-industry podcast Backstage At The Enharmonic, featuring guests such as Hal Blaine and Gordon Goodwin. He holds a Guinness World Record for participating in the largest simultaneous online drum roll.

== Critical reception ==
Jazz icon Dave Brubeck remarked of Kennedy's playing: "Your drumming sounds like it should; it swings!" The Philadelphia Inquirer described his work as "intense and sometimes far-out live performances." Kennedy's book Camp Jam: Rock Solid Drums was nominated for Educational Drum Book of the Year in the 2011 Modern Drummer reader's poll. His book Sixty Second Solos was a runner-up in the 2015 DRUMMIES awards.

== Discography ==
With The Sean J. Kennedy Quartet

- Road to Wailea (2004)
- Queen Anne's Revenge (2007) – featuring Bob Mintzer and Liberty DeVitto
- Hey! Where's My Tux?! (2013)

With The KAV Trio

- Outta' Here! (2011)

With Ramblin' Ant & The Locust Street Band

- Ramblin' Ant & The Locust Street Band (2010)

With Philadelphia Boys Choir & Chorale

- Celebrate the Sounds of the Season (2009)
- Sing, Choir of Angels (DVD) (2011)
- Celebrate the Sounds of the Season (with bonus disc) (2012)
- Winter Wonderland (2016)

With Allentown Band

- Our Band Heritage, Vol. 17: Seasons Greetings (2002)
- Our Band Heritage, Vol. 18: Band on Broadway (2003)
- Our Band Heritage, Vol. 19: Sesquicentennial: Music of Sousa (2004)
- Our Band Heritage, Vol. 20: A World of Marches (2005)

With Gardyn Jazz Orchestra

- Gardyn (2022)
- Vinyl Brews (2024)

With Other Artists

- Average White Cats – Frank DiBussolo Quartet (2010)
- You Remain – Olesia Gordynsky (2012)
- Toot Suite – Bob Wagner Quartet (2018)
- Secret Society of Sound, Vol. 1 – Mark Kramer and Samuel Heifetz (2025)

== Publications ==
- Camp Jam: Rock Solid Drums (2011, with Liberty DeVitto)
- I Used to Play Drums (2011, with Liberty DeVitto)
- Improvising and Soloing in the Pocket (with Richie Cannata)
- Sixty-Second Solos (2015, Alfred Music)
- Help! I'm Not a Drummer! (2017)
- Mentor | Sean J. Kennedy Salutes Ray Deeley – Modern Drummer Magazine (June 2021)
- Oodles of Accents: Jazz Drum Set Workbook (2025)
- Sixty-Second Solos | Advanced Edition (2025)
- Wipe Out! The Beat Behind Surf Rock Drumming (2025, Hudson Music)
