= A Matter of Trust =

1986 single by Billy Joel

Single by Billy Joel

from the album The Bridge
- B-side: "Getting Closer"
- Released: 1986
- Recorded: 1985
- Genre: Hard rock
- Length: 4:08
- Label: Columbia
- Songwriter: Billy Joel
- Producer: Phil Ramone

Billy Joel singles chronology
"Modern Woman" (1986)	"A Matter of Trust" (1986)	"This Is the Time" (1986)

Music video
- "A Matter of Trust" on YouTube

"A Matter of Trust" is a song by Billy Joel from his 1986 album The Bridge. It was released as the album's second single and became a top ten hit. The song gained major traction in the Soviet Union as part of a state-sponsored television promotion of Joel's songs in preparation for his 1987 USSR concerts, recorded on Kohuept.

The song differs from most Joel songs in that it is based on electric guitar rather than piano, which gives it a rock edge, compared to the soft-rock balladry with which he is more often associated.

== Music video ==
The song's music video, directed by Russell Mulcahy and conceived and produced by Paul Flattery, features Joel and his band performing in the basement of a building at 19-21 St. Mark's Place in New York City's East Village, and also features shots of various people in the city who eventually gather around the building's windows to see Joel perform. Most appear to be enjoying the performance except one woman on a fire escape who yells at them to "shut up!" However, she is ignored, and even members of the NYPD do not mind.

Joel's then-wife Christie Brinkley appears in the video holding their baby daughter Alexa. The music video also includes two quick cuts of both Ringo Starr (1:38) and Paul McCartney (2:01) watching from the street.

It is one of only a handful of Joel's music videos featuring him playing guitar (with "Allentown" being another example), a factor he cited when saying it was his favorite of all his videos.

== Reception ==
Billboard called it "refreshingly untidy rock" with "elegant song structure". Cash Box said that this "generic sounding pop tune may not be one of Joel’s best, but with his gut level vocal and the heavy rock guitar backing featured within it, the tune is given a cutting edge."

== Legacy ==
During the 2020 presidential cycle and COVID-19 pandemic, CNN broadcast commercials promoting the importance of trust and which featured "A Matter of Trust" as background music. CNN states in an email: "This version's stripped-down instrumentals set against the black and white images create space to pause and reflect on this year's chaotic news cycles, and offer hope for how we can grow better together from these unprecedented times."

== Charts ==
=== Weekly charts ===
Chart (1986–1987)	Peak position
Australia (Kent Music Report)	3
Canada Top Singles (RPM)	15
Israel (IBA)	11
New Zealand (Recorded Music NZ)	48
South Africa (Springbok)	3
UK Singles (Official Charts)	52
UK Airplay (Music & Media)	17
US Billboard Hot 100	10
US Billboard Hot Adult Contemporary Tracks	17
US Mainstream Rock (Billboard)	14

=== Year-end charts ===
Chart (1986)	Position
Australia (Kent Music Report)	18

== Certifications ==
Region	Certification	Certified units/sales
United States (RIAA)	Gold	500,000^{‡}
^{‡} Sales+streaming figures based on certification alone.
