= Jenna Rose =

American pop singer

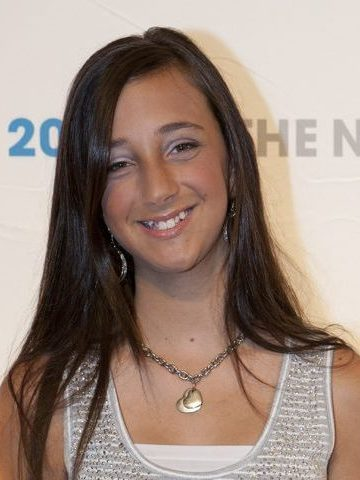
- Rose at Digitas NewFront, 2011

Background information
- Born: Jenna Rose Swerdlow; September 28, 1998 (age 27); Long Island, New York, U.S.
- Genres: Teen pop; bubblegum pop; dance-pop; pop
- Occupation: Singer
- Years active: 2009–present

Jenna Rose Swerdlow (born September 28, 1998), known professionally as Jenna Rose, is an American pop singer who gained media attention with her single "My Jeans."

== Background ==
Swerdlow was born on September 28, 1998, in Long Island, New York. She is an only child and an American singer. She spent her early life in Baldwin, New York, before relocating with her family to Dix Hills, New York, in 2005.

She began performing at the age of two and started receiving private vocal training at the age of eight. She initially participated in community theater before advancing to regional productions and Off-Broadway performances. Over the course of her career, she has appeared in more than 18 plays, including principal roles in Ragtime and The Miracle Worker, as well as the title role in the 2011 Off-Broadway play The Odella Williams Show.

Swerdlow was a finalist in Got Talent?, a Long Island talent competition, as well as the New York Knicks Kids Talent Search. In March 2011, Fox WNYW reported that her videos had amassed over one million views, she had recorded six songs, and she had performed during a halftime show at a New York Knicks game.

Swerdlow attended Hofstra University from 2016 to 2020, earning a bachelor's degree in mass communications. She was named to the Dean's List in May 2017 and May 2018. From 2018 to 2019, she worked two part-time jobs, serving as an intern at The Bittleman Show and as a day camp counselor at Park Shore Country Day Camp. As of 2023, she serves as Vice President of Client Relations and Associate Producer for The Donna Drake Show on CBS.

=== Music ===
In August 2009, it was reported that Swerdlow was among 20 musicians selected for individual coaching and recording sessions with longtime Billy Joel saxophonist Richie Cannata. She later stated on her Facebook page that Cannata's son, Eren Cannata, wrote and produced three singles for her: "Sweet Melody," "The Remedy," and "Spotlight." Since then, Swerdlow has collaborated with various songwriters, producers, and choreographers to record songs and music videos.

At age twelve, while in seventh grade at West Hollow Middle School, Swerdlow released her first music video, My Jeans, on YouTube on October 1, 2010. The video featured a rap by Baby Triggy and a cameo by Yung Deon, with locations including the Deer Park Tanger Outlet.

The video went viral, garnering over a million views and bringing Swerdlow media attention. However, My Jeans received largely negative feedback from YouTube viewers, accumulating 26,355 "likes" and 295,189 "dislikes" as of September 8, 2011. Critics not only criticized the song but also commented on Swerdlow’s appearance, clothing, and the video’s production quality.

The video remains popular, with the original upload surpassing 14 million views as of early September 2011. Despite its popularity, it has inspired numerous parodies, video responses, rap replies, and extensive written critiques.

Despite the negative reception of My Jeans, Swerdlow released O.M.G. in March 2011 and Don't Give Up in April 2011. Swerdlow and her parents described O.M.G. as a response to online criticism and cyberbullying. Although covered by the media, these follow-up songs received less attention than her original viral video. Both songs garnered similar negative ratings and were criticized by reviewers. O.M.G. had received over one million views as of May 2011. The lyrics were described as "disturbing" for a 12-year-old singer, and PerezHilton.com called the video "hyper-sexualized, uber-creepy, and if you really want to talk about jacking swag, not one dance move wasn't pulled from another video circa 1998." In October 2012, Swerdlow released her version of Walk On By, toured with two other groups, and performed at Nassau Coliseum.

Swerdlow was a drummer and drum major in her high school band, earning her the title of "Most Musical" in her graduating class.

In 2019, Swerdlow founded her independent record label, Rose Petal Records. The label's first release was Mess with Me featuring Edwrds. Since then, she has released more than 15 singles, including a cover of Train Wreck by James Arthur, which has become her most-streamed song on Spotify since its release on December 2, 2020. As of October 3, 2023, the track has accumulated over 60,000 streams.

== Recognition and followup ==
In February 2009, the town board of Huntington, New York, recognized Swerdlow "for her contributions to the performing arts community." Following the release of My Jeans, Swerdlow has been interviewed by various news networks, featured in media coverage, and has performed live in concert at the Westbury Music Fair.

In March 2011, Time magazine listed Swerdlow as one of "three kids who may be next to gain viral fame," alongside Rebecca Black.

Writers have made comparisons between Swerdlow and Rebecca Black, noting that both teens have produced videos in the same genre of bubblegum pop, have been "slammed by critics as being too provocative," and have received harsh feedback from the public. Her videos have inspired remixes, slowdowns, speedups, commentary, lip-syncs, and analyses on YouTube.

In 2012, Swerdlow's online presence was hacked, with her Twitter account, YouTube channel, and AOL address defaced with "Nazi swastikas and obscenities." Prior to the attack, her YouTube channel had accumulated a total of 25 million views.

In early 2022, a viral TikTok video emerged of Jenna Rose performing a female remake of hip hop artist Gunna’s song Pushin P. The TikTok garnered more than 10 million views. She later responded on Instagram, stating that although she was initially affected by the negative reactions to the video, she has learned to laugh along with her critics.

== Discography ==
=== Singles ===
Year	Title
2009	"Sweet Melody"
2010	"Spotlight"
2010	"My Jeans"
2011	"OMG"
2011	"The Remedy"
2011	"Unstoppable"
2011	"Don't Give Up"
2011	"Time Of Our Lives"
2012	"Life Is a Party"
2012	"Walk On By"
2013	"Forget You"
2014	"Earthquake"
2019	"Mess With Me ft. Edwrds”
2019	“Just Like ft. Edwrds”
2019	"Mixed Signals"
2019	"NGL"
2019	"Numb"
2020	"Chances”
2020	"Games"
2020	"Hope You’re Happy"
2020	"Other Girls"
2020	"Poison"
2020	"Love Drunk"
2021	"Infatuation”
2021	"By My Side"
2021	"Animal"
2022	"The River”
2022	"Vanilla”
2022	"Phone Tag"
2023	"Beautiful Crime”
2023	"Jealous”
2023	"Fighter”
2023	"Lost In Paradise”

== Filmography ==
Year	Title	Role	Director	Note
2010	Family Practice	Child Patient	Eric Norcross	TV pilot – Ep. 2: "Hood Cat"
2010	Mouse House	Jessica		
2010	Which Way	Lilith	Bill Herndon	TV series
2011	Caroline of Virginia	Young Caroline	Eric Norcross	
2011	Actor	Herself	Roberto Serrini	Documentary
