= The Bridge (Billy Joel album) =

1986 studio album by Billy Joel

Studio album by Billy Joel
- Released: July 25, 1986
- Recorded: 1985–1986
- Studios: The Power Station, New York City; Chelsea Sound, New York City; RCA Studios, New York City; Evergreen Studios, Burbank
- Genre: Rock
- Length: 40:06
- Label: Family Productions/Columbia
- Producer: Phil Ramone

Billy Joel chronology
Greatest Hits – Volume I & Volume II (1985)	The Bridge (1986)	Kohuept (1987)

Singles from The Bridge
- 1. "Modern Woman" Released: May 1986; 2. "A Matter of Trust" Released: July 1986; 3. "This Is the Time" Released: November 1986; 4. "Baby Grand" Released: March 1987

Professional ratings
Review scores
Source	Rating
AllMusic	3/5 stars
Chicago Tribune	(Mixed)
Christgau's Record Guide	B
Los Angeles Times	(Not favorable)
Rolling Stone	(Favorable)

The Bridge is the tenth studio album by American singer-songwriter Billy Joel, released on July 25, 1986. It was Joel's last studio album produced by Phil Ramone as well as the last to feature Joel's long-time bassist Doug Stegmeyer and rhythm guitarist Russell Javors. The album yielded several successful singles, including "A Matter of Trust" (peaking at No. 10), "Modern Woman" (which also appeared on the Ruthless People soundtrack, peaking at No. 10), and "This Is the Time" (peaking at No. 18).

== Background ==
Joel began work on the album—on which two of his major influences (Ray Charles and Steve Winwood) made guest appearances—in 1985. Charles sang a duet with Joel on the song "Baby Grand", and Winwood played Hammond organ on the song "Getting Closer"; Charles and Winwood later covered "Baby Grand" and "Getting Closer" respectively in concert. Other notable musicians who made guest appearances on the album include jazz musicians Ron Carter and Michael Brecker, who both played on the jazzy track "Big Man on Mulberry Street".

The album also had some new wave influences - the opening track, "Running on Ice", was heavily influenced by the Police while "Modern Woman" borrowed heavily from the style of Huey Lewis and the News. The final song recorded for the album, "Code of Silence", featured Cyndi Lauper who contributed backing vocals and received co-writing credit for the lyrics. Lauper later covered the song in concert. Joel would return the favor by contributing backing vocals on Lauper's song "Maybe He'll Know" for her 1986 album True Colors.

The Bridge was Joel's last album to carry the "Family Productions" logo which had appeared on all of Joel's albums up to that time as part of a deal that Columbia Records made to get Joel out of his first recording contract with Artie Ripp's Family Productions. In the closing song of the album—"Getting Closer"—Joel makes several of what are clearly attacks and observations on the iron-clad contract with Ripp, with references to "my stolen youth", "all the conmen and their acrobats who stomped me in the ground", and "I must live up to contracts".

== Critical reception ==
Reviewing in Christgau's Record Guide: The '80s (1990), Robert Christgau said: "Maybe [Joel's] youthful lyricism, meaning his knack for the tearjerker, is abandoning him. … Here he's best when he's brassy and literal: failed wise guy in 'Big Man on Mulberry Street,' Ray Charles's coequal on 'Baby Grand.' And even at his most rockin' he's seventy-five years retro whether he likes it or not—whenever he doesn't hit it just right you want to quarantine him for life in Atlantic City."

In a retrospective interview, Joel said: "Not a happy album. I wasn't simpatico with the musicians, some of whom I'd been working with a long time. I don't think the material was good; I was pressured by management to put it out too fast. By the end, I sort of gave up caring, which for me was unusual. I remember reading bad reviews and agreeing with them."

Joel later admitted to Rolling Stone that at the time of the album's writing and recording, he was in no mood to be in the studio, saying "Christie and I had just had Alexa, and I'd have much rather have been home with the baby ..." This angst over leaving his wife and daughter at home was poured into the album track "Temptation".

== Singles ==
Year	Single	Country	Chart	Position
1986	"Modern Woman"	United States	Billboard AC	7
1986	"Modern Woman"	United States	Billboard Hot 100	10
1986	"Modern Woman"	United States	Billboard Mainstream Rock	34
1986	"A Matter of Trust"	Australia	Kent Music Report	3
1986	"A Matter of Trust"	United States	Billboard Hot 100	10
1986	"A Matter of Trust"	United States	Billboard Mainstream Rock	14
1986	"A Matter of Trust"	United States	Billboard AC	17
1986	"A Matter of Trust"	United Kingdom	UK Singles Chart	52
1987	"This Is the Time"	United States	Billboard AC	1
1987	"This Is the Time"	United States	Billboard Hot 100	18
1987	"This Is the Time"	United States	Billboard Mainstream Rock	32
1987	"Baby Grand"	United States	Billboard AC	3
1987	"Baby Grand"	United States	Billboard Hot 100	75

== Track listing ==
All songs composed by Billy Joel, except "Code of Silence" written by Joel and Cyndi Lauper.

Side one
No.	Title	Length
1.	"Running on Ice"	3:15
2.	"This Is the Time"	4:59
3.	"A Matter of Trust"	4:09
4.	"Modern Woman"	3:48
5.	"Baby Grand (duet with Ray Charles)"	4:02

Side two
No.	Title	Length
6.	"Big Man on Mulberry Street"	5:26
7.	"Temptation"	4:12
8.	"Code of Silence" (duet with Cyndi Lauper)	5:15
9.	"Getting Closer"	5:00

== Personnel ==
- Billy Joel – lead vocals, backing vocals, acoustic piano (1–3, 5–9), synthesizers (1–4, 6–8), Fender Rhodes (9)
- David Brown – guitar (1–4, 6, 8, 9), 12-string acoustic guitar (8)
- Russell Javors – guitar (1–4, 6, 8, 9)
- Doug Stegmeyer – bass (1–4, 6, 7, 8)
- Liberty DeVitto – drums (1–4, 6–9), percussion (9)
- Mark Rivera – tenor saxophone (4), alto saxophone (7)

=== Additional musicians ===
- Peter Hewlett – backing vocals (1)
- Rob Mounsey – additional synthesizers (1), orchestration (2, 4, 6)
- Jeff Bova – additional synthesizers (3, 8), orchestration (7)
- Jimmy Bralower – percussion (4)
- Ray Charles – acoustic piano (5), lead vocals (5)
- Vinnie Colaiuta – drums (5)
- Neil Stubenhaus – bass (5)
- Dean Parks – guitar (5)
- Patrick Williams – arrangements (5)
- Ron Carter – acoustic bass (6)
- Eddie Daniels – alto saxophone (6)
- Michael Brecker – tenor saxophone (6)
- Ronnie Cuber – baritone saxophone (6)
- Marvin Stamm – trumpet (6)
- Alan Rubin – trumpet (6)
- Dave Bargeron – trombone (6)
- Philippe Saisse – orchestration (7)
- Cyndi Lauper – harmony vocals (8)
- Don Brooks – harmonica (8)
- Steve Winwood – Hammond B-3 (9)
- Neil Jason – bass (9)
- John McCurry – guitar (9)

=== Technical ===
- Produced by Phil Ramone
- Engineered by Jim Boyer
- Associate engineers – Steve Boyer, Fred Tenny, David Dickson, and Bradshaw Leigh
- Technical support – Joe Salvatto, Gary Ciuzio, Joe Lopes, Frank Rodriguez, Peter Bergren, Bruce Howell, Cary Butler, Ed Evans, Mark Betts, Steve Buller, Ricki Begin, Audrey Tanaka, Billy Rothschild, and Phil Vachon
- Production coordinator – Joseph D'Ambrosio
- Support system – Jim Flynn, Barry Bongiovi, and The Power Station staff
- Mastering by Ted Jensen at Sterling Sound (New York, NY)
- Design – Mark Larson
- Cover painting – Brad Holland
- Photography – Patrick Demarchelier, Larry Busacca, Phil Ramone, Charles Reilly, and Sam Emerson

== Charts ==
=== Weekly charts ===
Chart (1986)	Peak position
Australia (Kent Music Report)	2
Austrian Albums (Ö3 Austria)	18
Belgian Albums (BEA)	8
Canadian Albums (RPM)	10
Dutch Albums (MegaCharts)	20
European Top 100 Albums	17
Finnish Albums (Suomen virallinen lista)	14
Italian Albums (Musica e Dischi)	17
Japanese Albums (Oricon)	2
New Zealand Albums (RIANZ)	12
Norwegian Albums (VG-lista)	13
Swedish Albums (Sverigetopplistan)	25
Swiss Albums (Schweizer Hitparade)	22
UK Albums (OCC)	38
US Billboard 200	7
West German Albums (Media Control)	34

=== Year-end charts ===
Chart (1986)	Position
Australian Albums Chart	11
Canadian Albums Chart	48
Japanese Albums Chart	34
Chart (1987)	Position
Canadian Albums Chart	85
US Billboard 200	50

== Certifications ==
Region	Certification	Certified units/sales
Canada (Music Canada)	2× Platinum	200,000^{^}
Japan (Oricon Charts)	—	250,000
New Zealand (RMNZ)	Gold	7,500^{^}
United Kingdom (BPI)	Silver	60,000^{^}
United States (RIAA)	2× Platinum	2,000,000^{^}
^{^} Shipments figures based on certification alone.
