= The Long Island Music and Entertainment Hall of Fame =

- Formation: July 2005
- Type: Nonprofit
- Purpose: Cultural
- Headquarters: Stony Brook, New York, U.S.
- Website: limusichalloffame.org

The Long Island Music and Entertainment Hall of Fame (also known as LIMEHOF) is a cultural nonprofit organization and museum located in Stony Brook within Suffolk County, on Long Island, in New York, United States.

== Overview ==
The Long Island Music and Entertainment Hall of Fame was incorporated in July 2005 under the New York State Board of Regents, as a nonprofit organization and holds a provisional charter to operate as a museum in the state of New York. It recognizes musicians, music executives, and other music and entertainment professionals who have contributed to the musical and entertainment heritage of Long Island through Induction Ceremonies held every two years since 2006. Inductees are selected by a committee that determines their eligibility through their contributions and time spent living and performing within the geographic area of Long Island, which includes Brooklyn, Queens, Nassau, and Suffolk Counties.

One of the organization’s primary missions is to support local education. It has distributed tens of thousands of dollars in scholarships to Long Island high school Seniors, gives annual Educator of Note Awards to deserving educators, and hosts concerts where high school bands and orchestras perform with LIMEHOF inductees.

In November 2022, the organization opened the Long Island Music and Entertainment Hall of Fame and Museum in Stony Brook, NY. The ribbon cutting ceremony was performed by Ernie Canadeo, Chairman, and the board of directors of the organization, local government officials, and the board of the Ward Melville Heritage Organization, the landlord of the property. The 8,800-square-foot (820 m^{2}) building includes a museum of Long Island music history celebrating its over 120 Inductees, memorabilia, photographs and videos, a rotating exhibit (the first of which was “Long Island’s Legendary Club Scene – 1960s-80s"), a surround sound theater, and two stages for musical performances and speaker presentations.

LIMEHOF's presenting sponsor is Catholic Health, a prominent Long Island health care system; a program entitled "Health and Harmony" launched in 2023, exploring and cultivating the relationship between music and health & wellness.

== Inductees ==
=== 2006 ===
- Ron Alexenburg
- Mose Allison
- Sam Ash
- Tony Bennett
- Gary U.S. Bonds
- Harry Chapin
- George M. Cohan
- John Coltrane
- Perry Como
- James (Jimmy) D'Aquisto
- Debbie Gibson
- George Gershwin
- Richie Havens
- Joan Jett
- Billy Joel
- Cyndi Lauper
- Little Anthony and the Imperials
- Long Island Philharmonic
- Edward "Little Buster" Forehand
- The Brooklyn Bridge
- Marian McPartland
- George "Shadow" Morton
- Run-DMC
- Neil Sedaka
- Gene Simmons
- Paul Stanley
- Peter Criss
- Stray Cats
- Stony Brook University
- Sam "Bluzman" Taylor
- Twisted Sister
- Vanilla Fudge
- Leslie West

=== 2008 ===
The second induction ceremony was held at The Garden City Hotel in Garden City, New York, on October 30, 2008.

- Louis Armstrong
- Count Basie
- Walter Becker
- Pat Benatar
- Blue Öyster Cult
- Bob Buchmann
- Mariah Carey
- Aaron Copland
- Neil Diamond
- The Good Rats
- Arlo Guthrie
- Marvin Hamlisch
- Carole King
- LL Cool J
- Guy Lombardo
- Eddie Money
- Public Enemy
- The Ramones
- Jean Ritchie
- Beverly Sills
- Simon and Garfunkel
- Barbra Streisand
- The Tokens
- Kenny Vance

=== 2010 ===
The third induction ceremony was held at Oheka Castle in West Hills on November 16, 2010.

- Dream Theater
- Rakim
- Lou Reed
- Eric B
- Eddie Palmieri
- Donnie McClurkin
- My Father's Place
- Denis McNamara
- Teddy Charles
- Morton Gould
- Roy Haynes
- Al Kooper
- Steve Martin - agent
- The Shangri-Las
- Bob Gruen
- Oscar Brand
- The Magic Garden's Carole Demas & Paula Janis
- John Zorn

=== 2012 ===
The fourth induction ceremony was held at The Paramount in Huntington on October 18, 2012.

- Ellie Greenwich
- Suffocation
- The Lovin' Spoonful
- Randy Weston
- Ervin Drake
- Leo Kraft
- Zebra
- Stanley Drucker
- Barnaby Bye
- Connie Stevens
- CSS Security Services
- Jones Beach Theater
- Salt-N-Pepa
- Taylor Dayne
- The Thunderbird Sisters and the Shinnecock Indian Nation
- Walk 97.5
- Whodini

=== 2014 ===
The fifth induction ceremony took place at the Paramount in Huntington on October 23, 2014.

- Doug Stegmeyer (posthumously)
- Liberty DeVitto
- Richie Cannata
- Clive Davis
- Gerry Goffin
- Kurtis Blow
- Ron Delsener
- Steve Thompson
- Russell Javors

=== 2016 ===
The 2016 Induction ceremony took place on Thursday, November 3 at The Space at Westbury.

- Big Daddy Kane
- Charles Koppelman
- Carter Burwell
- Garland Jeffreys
- Sandy Pearlman
- Santo & Johnny
- Jim Steinman
- Steve Vai
- Vince Giordano
- Westbury Music Fair
- Steven Van Zandt was presented the 2016 Harry Chapin Award for his dedication to music education on Long Island and across the nation.

=== 2018 ===
- Jon Bauman
- EPMD
- Good Times Magazine
- Michael Lang
- Melanie
- Artie Kornfeld
- Brucie Morrow
- Elliott Murphy
- Seymour Stein
- Taking Back Sunday
- Jimmy Webb
- Tommy Byrnes

=== 2020 ===
- Wayne Robins

=== 2021 ===
- Pat DeRosa

=== 2023 ===
- The Fat Boys
- Roger Earl
- The Illusion
- Robin Wilson

=== 2024 ===
- Davy DMX
- DJ Jazzy Jeff
- DJ Hurricane
- Stephen Schwartz

=== 2025 ===
- Blackmore's Night
- The Hassles
- WLIR

=== 2026 ===
- Dennis Arfa
- Ernie Canadeo
- Jim Faith
- Kevin O’Callaghan
- Norm Prusslin

== See also ==
- List of music museums
