= Edward "Little Buster" Forehand =

American musician (1942–2006)

Little Buster (September 28, 1942 – May 11, 2006) was an American soul and blues musician. He was born sighted, but developed glaucoma at the age of three. By the time his vision was completely gone, he was fluent on six instruments, including the guitar.

== Biography ==
Born in Hertford, North Carolina, he moved to Westbury, Long Island at age 16. His first professional gig was at the Brooklyn Paramount, where he was a back-up guitarist for Alan Freed's Rock and Roll shows. He also became a regular at Long Island clubs.

In 1961, Buster composed his first original song "Looking For a Home" while living in Glen Cove. First recorded on Josie/Jubilee after winning a talent contest at Harlem's Apollo Theater in 1964, Buster released "Looking For a Home". He recorded a series of singles there, including his biggest hit in 1968, Doc Pomus' "Young Boy Blues". Buster's last single with Josie was "City of Blues" / "Cry Me a River". His singles and several new compositions were compiled for the 1970 album, Looking For a Home that was finally by the UK label Sequel in 1997.

Al Kooper covered "Looking For A Home" on his 1970 album Kooper Session, released on Columbia Records.

Buster changed his focus, concentrating on live blues with his band, The Soul Brothers. Buster married his wife, Mary, in 1969.

In 1995, Buster recorded his Bullseye release, Right On Time. This release brought him worldwide exposure, with a W.C. Handy Award nomination, and a runner-up award for Living Blues magazine's Critics' Award. His 2000 CD Work Your Show opened up mass media exposure via CBS This Morning, Late Night with Conan O'Brien, Late Show with David Letterman, on Dan Aykroyd's House of Blues Hour, international music festivals, and articles in Juke Blues, Backyard Blues and 20th Century Guitar magazines.

In 2000, Buster began his own label with friends Steve Kleinberg and Ayanna Hobson, where he released his final CD, Little Buster and the Soul Brothers, Live Volume One. His band consisted of himself on guitar and vocals, Jerry Harshaw on saxophone, Frank Anstiss on drums, Alan Levy on bass and Robert Schlesinger on keyboards. As Andy Breslau said in the liner notes for Right On Time,

"Edward 'Little Buster' Forehand is a sublimely talented soul singer, a tough blues guitarist and a sure-handed songwriter with a knack for making rhythm and blues songs that evoke the classic 1960s sound. As one of New York's great undiscovered treasures, Buster has played the Long Island club circuit for over four decades."

During four decades many musicians honed their skills in Buster's band. These included Lee Vaughn on saxophone, Val and Cousin Brucie on bass guitar, Lionel Cordew on drums, Jonathan Kampner on drums, Eileen Murphy on drums, Chris Candida on drums, Ed Hoey on percussion, Gene Cordew on keyboards, Roast Beef Joe on keyboards, Mitch Weiss on chromatic harmonica, guitarists Scott Ross, and Stevie Cochran.

In 2004, Little Buster had a series of strokes. In May 2006, he died as a result of complications from those strokes and diabetes. He received a Lifetime Achievement Award from the Long Island Blues Society in 2002 for his efforts on behalf of music. He was inducted into the Long Island Music Hall of Fame in 2006.
