= This Is the Time (Billy Joel song) =

1986 song by Billy Joel

Single by Billy Joel

from the album The Bridge
- B-side: "Code of Silence"
- Released: November 1986
- Length: 4:56
- Label: Columbia
- Songwriter: Billy Joel
- Producer: Phil Ramone

Billy Joel singles chronology
"A Matter of Trust" (1986)	"This Is the Time" (1986)	"Baby Grand" (1986)

"This Is the Time" is a song performed by Billy Joel released as the third single from his album The Bridge. The song reached No. 18 on the U.S. Billboard Hot 100 and topped the Billboard Adult Contemporary chart.

== Reception ==
Billboard called it a "melancholy rock ballad from a doom-filled perspective." Cash Box said that the "songwriting genius of Joel is in force again in this wistful, melodic ballad."

== Chart positions ==
Chart (1986–1987)	Peak position
Australia (Kent Music Report)	73
Canadian Singles Chart	26
U.S. Billboard Hot 100	18
U.S. Billboard Adult Contemporary	1
U.S. Billboard Album Rock Tracks	32

== In pop culture ==
- The song was featured on the NBA VHS NBA Superstars, in a segment showcasing Hall of Fame players from the 1950s to the 1970s. It was also played during Larry Bird's retirement ceremony at the Boston Garden in 1993, this time honoring past players of the Boston Celtics.
- "This Is the Time" is the title of a 2014 season 2 episode of The Carrie Diaries in which Carrie (AnnaSophia Robb) attends her senior prom. Joel's song is referenced by character Donna LaDonna (Chloe Bridges) during her prom queen acceptance speech as the music begins to play in the background. It is mentioned twice more in conversations shortly thereafter. The Correatown cover version of the song also plays in the closing minutes of this penultimate episode.
- In Italy this song was used as opening and closing theme for the soap opera Guiding Light (In Italy called Sentieri) from 1986 to 2007.
