= Richie Cannata =

Musical artist (b. 1949)

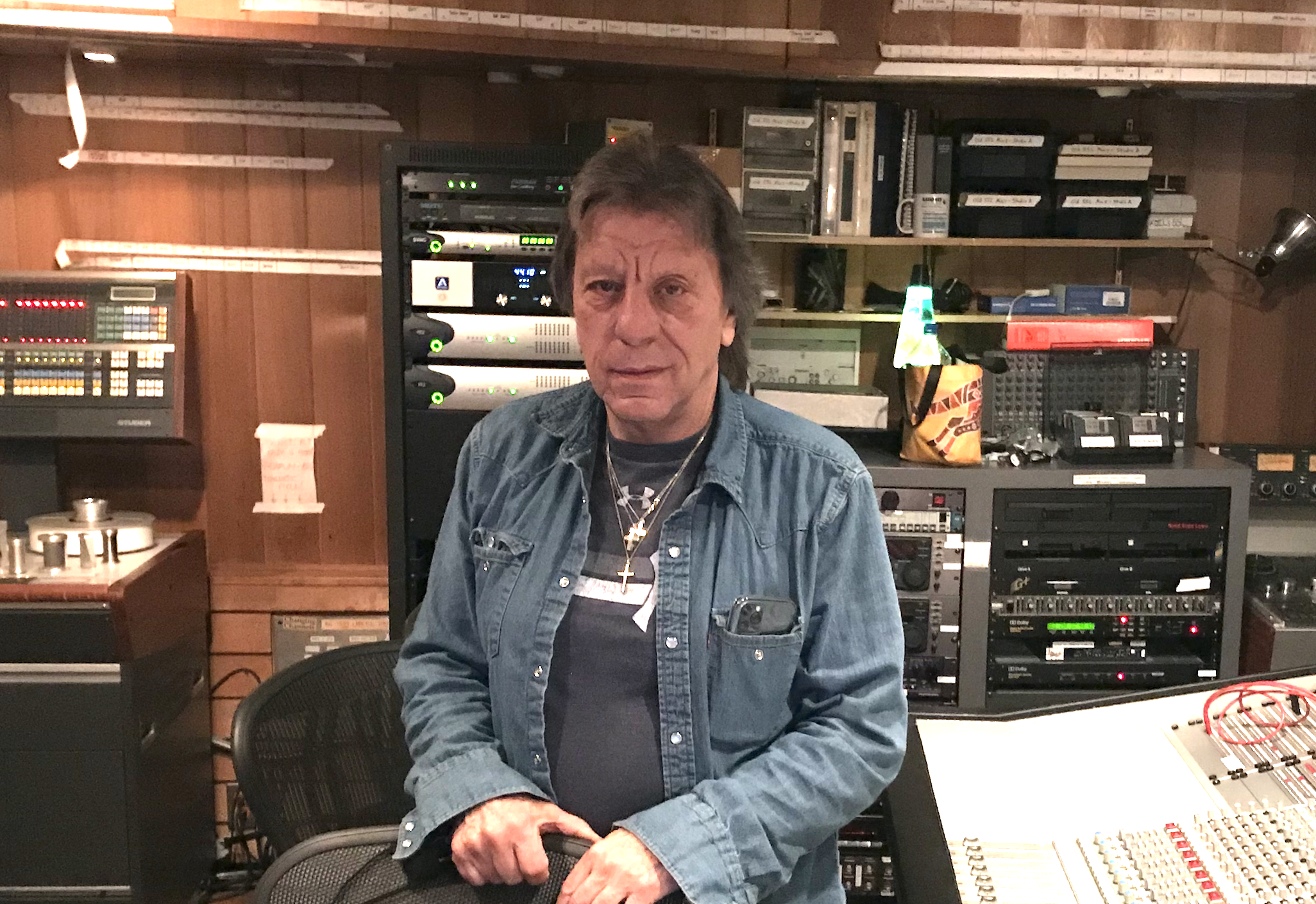
- Richie Cannata in March 2021

Background information
- Born: March 3, 1949 (age 77); Brooklyn, New York, U.S.
- Origin: Long Island, New York, U.S.
- Genres: Pop; pop rock; rock
- Occupations: Musician; producer; studio owner
- Instruments: Saxophone; flute; clarinet; keyboards
- Spouse: Shirlene Cannata (1979–present)

Richie Cannata (born March 3, 1949) is an American music producer, saxophonist, keyboardist and studio owner. He is most notable for playing saxophone in Billy Joel's band alongside Liberty DeVitto, Russell Javors, and Doug Stegmeyer. After leaving the band in 1981, he opened Cove City Sound Studios in Glen Cove, New York. Artists including Celine Dion, Billy Joel, Jennifer Lopez and Marc Anthony have recorded in Cannata's studio. Cannata also worked with the Beach Boys for most of the 1990s, touring and occasionally recording with them during this period.

== Early life ==
Cannata, who is of Italian heritage, was born March 3, 1949 in Brooklyn, New York, the son of Ernest (March 26, 1914 – April 14, 1993) and Anna (February 25, 1926 — April 1, 2007) Cannata. Interested in music from a very early age, Cannata was introduced by his family first to the piano at the age of four and later to clarinet and tenor saxophone at the age of eight. He also plays flute and keyboards in addition to alto, soprano and baritone sax.

In 1950s his family moved to Garden City South where Cannata blossomed as a musician. He played his first gig at the age of 13 and went on to play in school bands and with local musicians, perfecting his skills as a live performer and studio musician.

== Career ==
Over the years Cannata's performing style has been influenced by John Coltrane, Charlie Parker, Gene Ammons, and King Curtis.

In 1975, Cannata was introduced to Billy Joel's bass player Doug Stegmeyer through Stegmeyer's brother Al. At the time, Joel was looking for a sax player and Cannata was given a position in the band.

Cannata played in Tommy Shaw's band in the mid-1980s, performing on Shaw's first three solo albums. He also played for Taylor Dayne in the late 1980s/early 1990s, and was a saxophonist with Bernie Williams.

From 1991 until 1998, Cannata toured with the Beach Boys, playing saxophone, woodwinds and synthesizers. After leaving the Beach Boys in 1998, he frequently worked with the band's co-founder Al Jardine on his solo tours and appeared on one song on Jardine's solo album A Postcard from California.

In 1993, Cannata briefly reunited with Joel for Joel's River of Dreams album. In 2006, Cannata briefly toured again with Joel, and was part of his record-setting 12-show run at Madison Square Garden. In 2009, Cannata coached and oversaw recording sessions with singer Jenna Rose, who only a year later became a viral video sensation.

In December 2013, Cannata and Sean J. Kennedy's educational jazz improv play-along series Improvising and Soloing in the Pocket (Book/CD/DVD) was released by Carl Fischer Music to critical acclaim. The series includes books for all instruments, and features music from Cannata's 2011 solo album Richie Cannata, featuring Cannata and Julio Fernandez, guitarist of jazz fusion/smooth jazz group Spyro Gyra.

On October 23, 2014, Cannata, DeVitto, and Javors (with Stegmeyer, posthumously) were inducted into the Long Island Music Hall of Fame, primarily for their work with Joel. Shortly thereafter, Cannata, DeVitto, and Javors officially formed the Lords of 52nd Street band; the band also includes a pianist and lead vocalist, keyboardist, and a guitarist, and plays faithful renditions of the recorded Joel originals.

On July 11, 2016, Cannata received special recognition from Glen Cove Mayor for his contributions to the city's music heritage. He was presented with the key to Glen Cove and named the downtown intersection of Bridge, School and Glen Streets as "Richie Cannata Place" for the city's summer music season.

== Billy Joel album credits ==
- 1976 Turnstiles
- 1977 The Stranger
- 1978 52nd Street
- 1980 Glass Houses
- 1981 Songs in the Attic
- 1985 Greatest Hits Volume I & II
- 1993 River of Dreams
- 1997 Greatest Hits Volume III

== See also ==
- List of Billy Joel band members
