= Scandinavian Skies =

1982 song by Billy Joel

Song by Billy Joel

from the album The Nylon Curtain
- Released: September 23, 1982
- Recorded: Spring 1982
- Studio: A&R, New York City; Mediasound, New York City
- Genre: Psychedelic pop
- Length: 6:00
- Label: Columbia
- Songwriter: Billy Joel
- Producer: Phil Ramone

"Scandinavian Skies" is a song written by Billy Joel that was first released on his 1982 album The Nylon Curtain. Commentators have noted its Beatle-esque elements and obscure lyrics. Joel has stated that the song was inspired by an experience with heroin. Although not released as a single, it reached #38 on Billboard's Mainstream Rock chart.

== Lyrics and music ==
The lyrics of "Scandinavian Skies" appear to be about an event that occurred to Joel during a tour of Europe. The lyrics refer to an incident that occurred in Amsterdam that caused the musicians to flee the Netherlands to Sweden. Later, in the song Joel sings of issues that occurred while touring Scandinavia, including financial concerns and loss of power during a show in Norway. The lyrics are not explicit about what the "surprise" or "sins of Amsterdam" were, although music critic Mark Bego suggests that they appear to relate to drugs and possibly sex. Ken Bielen suggests that these surprises and sins may relate to the previous song on The Nylon Curtain, another song with obscure lyrics called "Surprises." Rolling Stone critic Stephen Holden speculated that the lyrics suggest "that Joel may see war and devastation as the inevitable future of a disillusioned world," especially when considered in combination with a Nylon Curtain song explicitly about the Vietnam War, "Goodnight Saigon." At the time of the song's initial release, Joel merely said that it is "a drug and decadence song" that represents the "nightmare of [his] generation's drug experiences." But Joel has since acknowledged that the subject of the song was an experience with using heroin. According to Joel, "It got me so high, I didn’t know how to deal with it. It scared me." Joel's producer Phil Ramone stated that "it's a basic story of what happened to Billy and the band, their first travels. It's not too dissimilar to what happened to the Beatles or other people, experiencing hallucinations that tie you down to madness."

"Scandinavian Skies" opens with string instruments played backwards over which Joel plays a repeated C note octave on piano. The song is in the key of F major. The opening also incorporates a recording in Dutch of an actual boarding announcement for a flight from Amsterdam to Stockholm and the sound of an airplane landing. Rolling Stone Album Guide critic Paul Evans describes the melody as "strong." The song ends with an "incomprehensible voiceover."

== Beatle comparisons ==
Paul McCartney biographer Ray Coleman described "Scandinavian Skies" as being "a tribute to Paul's romanticism." Joel biographer Hank Bordowitz also described "Scandinavian Skies" as being reminiscent of McCartney's work with the Beatles. Bego notes a similarity between the sound of the airplane landing, which was recorded in stereo, to a similar device at the beginning of McCartney's "Back in the U.S.S.R."

Other authors have noted similarities to John Lennon's work. During the recording Ramone noted that Joel's vocal sounded like Lennon and told him "You're really singing it like John Lennon too much," which led Joel to try to sing it differently but when that didn't work Joel reverted to the Lennon-like vocal. Bielen and other writers have also commented on the Lennonesque vocal performance. Joel biographers including Bielen, Bego and Fred Schruers point out similarities with Beatles psychedelic music and particularly Lennon's "Strawberry Fields Forever". Bego specifies the similarity further by pointing out the "loopy strings and highly manipulated musical tracks." Bielen and Bego also point out similarities with Lennon's "I Am the Walrus", with Bielen explicitly citing the "incomprehensible voiceover" at the end, which he also notes is reminiscent of the Lennon penned "All You Need Is Love". Billboard author Roman Kozak stated that "Scandinavian Skies" "could almost be Joel's 'Norwegian Wood'." Bielen also cites the backwards strings, the use of sound effects like the boarding announcements, string arrangements similar to those of Beatles' producer George Martin, and drumming similar to that of Ringo Starr as additional Beatle-esque elements in the song.

== Reception ==
"Scandinavian Skies" was not released as a single but peaked at #38 on Billboard's Mainstream Rock chart. It spent two weeks in the Top 40.
