= Russell Javors =

Musical artist (b. 1952)

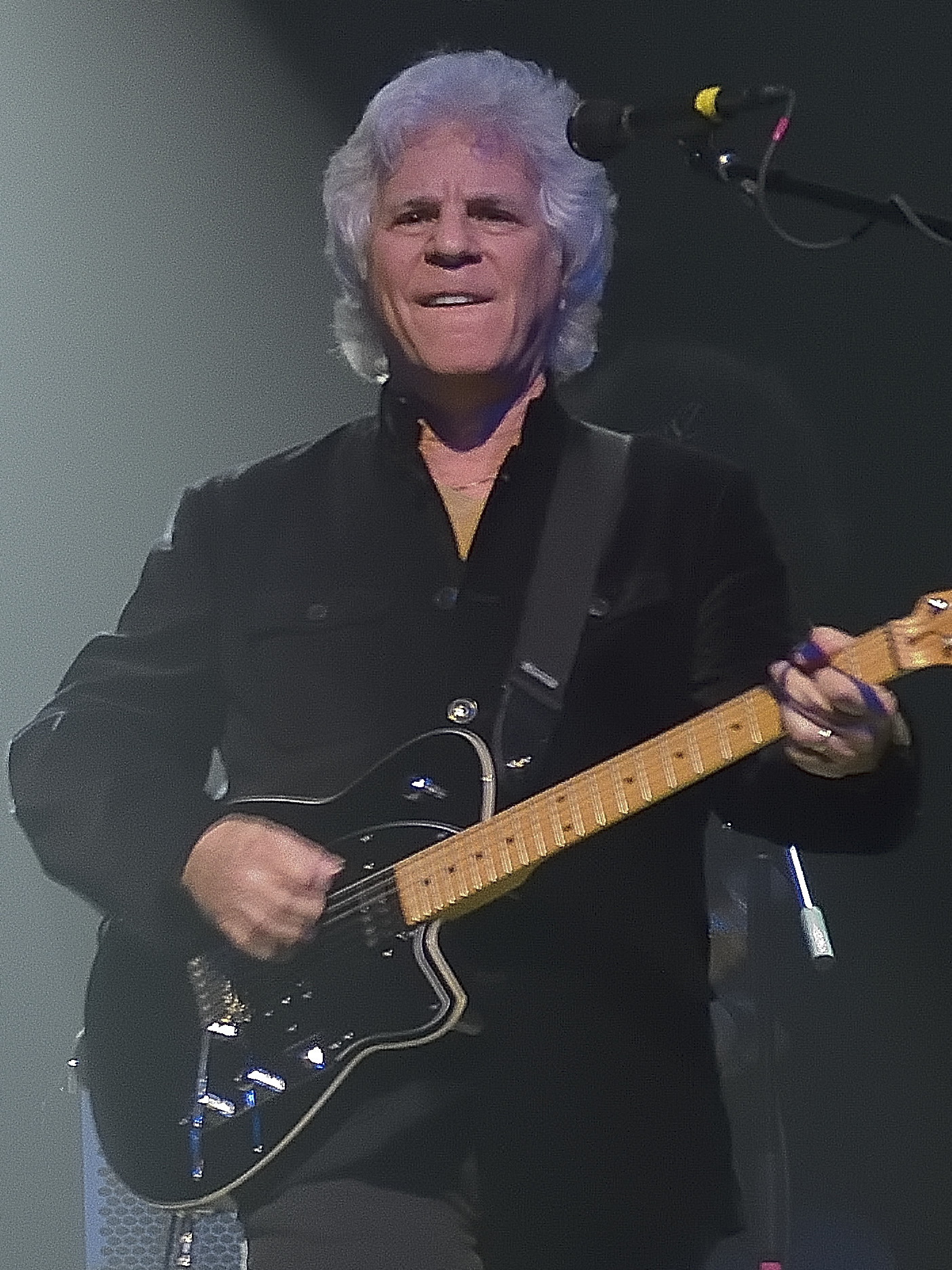
- Javors in 2018

Background information
- Born: June 13, 1952 (age 73)
- Origin: Brooklyn, New York, United States
- Genres: Pop, pop rock, rock
- Occupation: Musician
- Instruments: Guitar, harmonica, backing vocals
- Years active: 1967–present

Russell Javors (born June 13, 1952) is an American rock guitarist. He is best known as a rhythm guitarist for Billy Joel from 1976 to 1989.

== Career ==
Javors was born in Brooklyn, New York and spent his childhood in Plainview, Long Island. At age 15, he was performing songs with his childhood friend Liberty DeVitto. He met Doug Stegmeyer in high school and along with Howard Emerson, formed the band Topper.

Together, they performed the songs that Javors wrote. Topper became noticed by Billy Joel. Joel found he needed a bassist on his Streetlife Serenade tour and invited Stegmeyer to join him. Javors, DeVitto, and Emerson soon followed. With the addition of multi-instrumentalist Richie Cannata, Topper became the Billy Joel Band. Javors played rhythm guitar with Joel from 1975 until 1989.

On October 23, 2014, Javors, Cannata, and DeVitto (with Stegmeyer, posthumously) were inducted into the Long Island Music Hall of Fame, primarily for their work with Joel. Shortly thereafter, Javors, Cannata, and DeVitto officially formed the Lords of 52nd Street band; the band also includes a pianist and lead vocalist, keyboardist, and a guitarist, and plays faithful renditions of the recorded Joel originals.

Javors also wrote two songs and played guitar on Karen Carpenter's 1979 self-titled album, which was released in 1996.

== See also ==
- Billy Joel Band

== Billy Joel album credits ==
- 1976 Turnstiles
- 1978 52nd Street
- 1980 Glass Houses
- 1981 Songs in the Attic
- 1982 The Nylon Curtain
- 1983 An Innocent Man
- 1985 Greatest Hits Volume I & II
- 1986 The Bridge
- 1987 Kohuept
- 1997 Greatest Hits Volume III
