= Tycoon (band) =

American band

Tycoon was an American rock band from New York City. The group released two records on Arista Records. Their eponymous debut album charted one Top 40 hit single in 1979, "Such a Woman" (U.S. Billboard Hot 100 #26, AUS #99), and it was produced by Robert John "Mutt" Lange. Their 1981 album, Turn Out the Lights, was produced by Vini Poncia.

== Members ==
- Norman Mershon (vocals, guitar)
- Jon Gordon (guitar)
- Bobby Messano (guitar, vocals)
- Mark Rivera (saxophone, vocals)
- Keith Taylor (keyboards)
- Mark Kreider (bass, violin, vibes)
- Richard Steinberg / Mike Braun (drums)

== Discography ==
- Tycoon (Arista Records, 1979) U.S. #41, AUS #59
- Turn Out the Lights (Arista, 1981)
- Opportunity Knocks (Self Produced, 1983) available at the "It's About Music" website
