= Mark Rivera =

US-American rock musician and music director (born 1953)

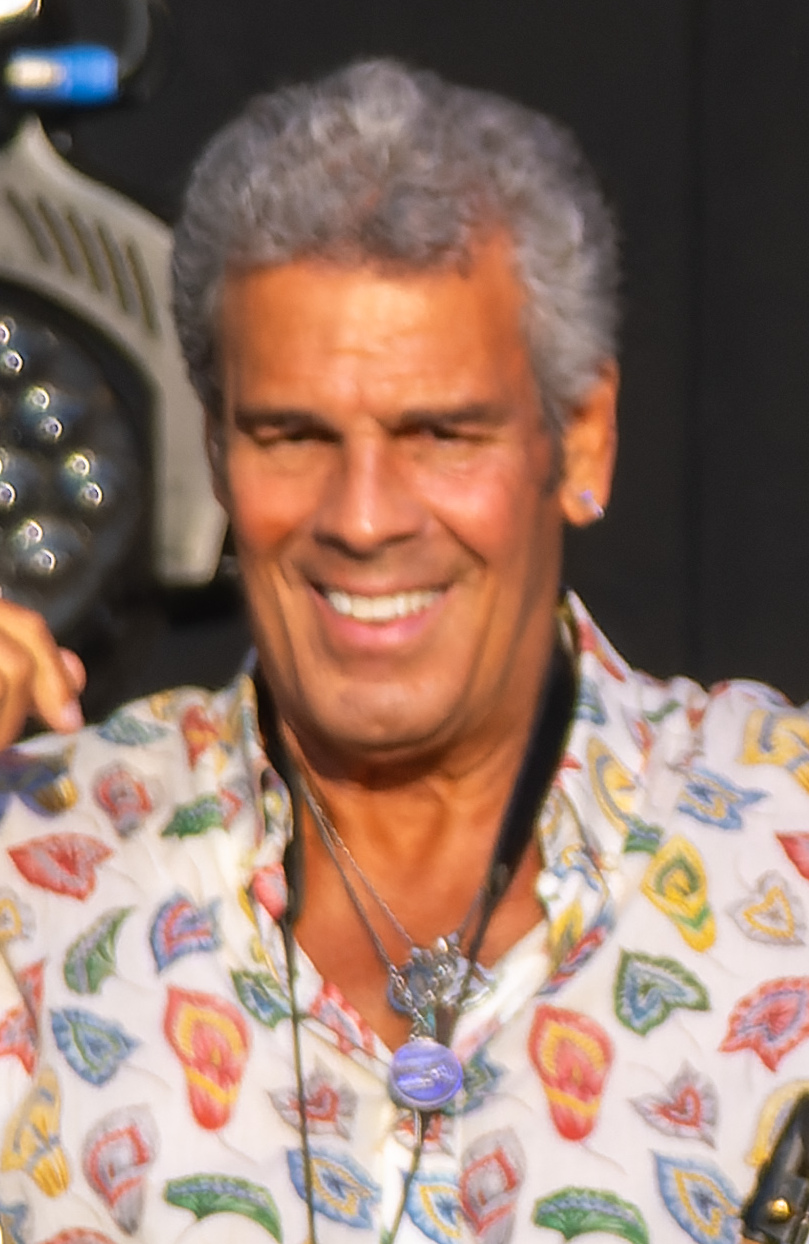
- Rivera in 2023

Background information
- Born: May 24, 1953 (age 73); Brooklyn, New York, U.S.
- Genres: Rock, pop
- Occupations: Musician; singer; musical director
- Instruments: Saxophone; vocals; guitar; percussion; keyboards
- Member of: Billy Joel Band
- Formerly of: Ringo Starr & His All-Starr Band

Mark Rivera (born May 24, 1953) is an American saxophonist, multi-instrumentalist, singer, and musical director who is mostly known for his work with Billy Joel. In addition to playing soprano, alto, tenor, and baritone saxophone, Rivera's musical abilities include vocals, guitar, bass, flute, percussion, hammer and chromium steel pipe, and keyboards.

== Early life ==
Mark Rivera was born in Brooklyn, New York, and attended the High School of Performing Arts in Manhattan. His mother is American of unknown ancestry and his father is of Puerto Rican ancestry.

== Career ==
Rivera's first national exposure came with the band Tycoon in the mid-1970s. From this venture he met the legendary producer Robert John "Mutt" Lange. Lange, as part of an association with Mick Jones and Lou Gramm of Foreigner, introduced Rivera to the "big leagues" of rock music, recording and performing.

Over the years, Rivera has worked with Hall & Oates, Peter Gabriel on his groundbreaking So album (where Rivera played on "Sledgehammer" and "Big Time"), Simon & Garfunkel, John Lennon, Billy Ocean, and Eagles guitarist Joe Walsh.

Rivera has played with Billy Joel and his band since 1982, replacing Richie Cannata.

In 1995, Rivera joined Ringo Starr & His All-Starr Band, with which he would continue for several tours.

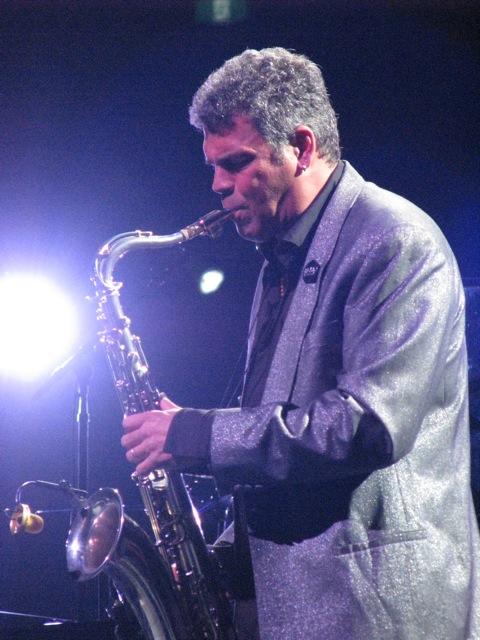
Rivera live with Billy Joel in 2008

In 2014, Rivera released his first solo album, Common Bond, which includes appearances by Joel, Starr, Nils Lofgren and Steve Lukather. The song "Money Money Money" was a finalist for 2014's Coolest Song in the World on Little Steven's Underground Garage.

In February 2023, Rivera released his autobiography, Sideman: In Pursuit of the Next Gig.

== Musical director ==
Rivera's work as a musical director has gained recognition from his association with Ringo Starr & His All-Starr Band, Billy Joel, and Elton John. In 2007, he was musical director for "Dear Mr. Fantasy: A Celebration for Jim Capaldi" featuring Steve Winwood, Joe Walsh, Paul Weller, Pete Townshend and Jon Lord. He also developed a career in promoting and producing events.

== See also ==
- Billy Joel Band
