= Liberty DeVitto =

American rock drummer (b. 1950)

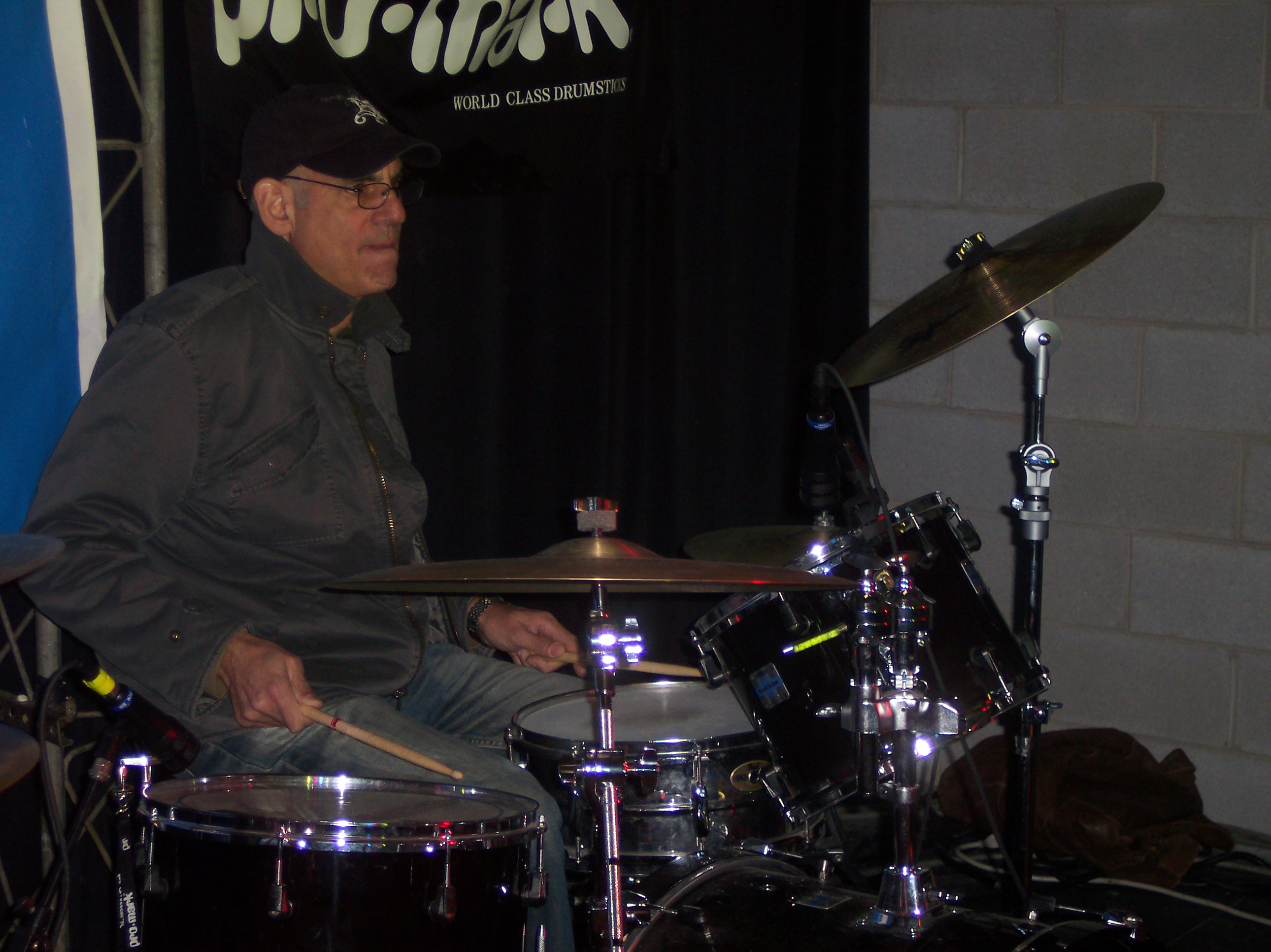
- Liberty DeVitto plays at a Camp Jam session in midtown Atlanta, February 2007

Background information
- Born: Liberatori Devitto; August 8, 1950 (age 76); New York City, U.S.
- Origin: Brooklyn, New York City
- Genres: Pop; pop rock; rock
- Occupations: Musician, drummer
- Instruments: Drums; percussion
- Years active: 1968–present

Liberatori "Liberty" DeVitto (born August 8, 1950) is an American rock drummer. He is best known for his work as a drummer for singer-songwriter Billy Joel's recording and touring band. He has been a session drummer on recordings of other artists and is a member of The Slim Kings. He is credited as a drummer on records which have sold a combined total of 150 million units worldwide.

== Early life and education ==
DeVitto was born in New York City, of Italian ancestry. His father was a police officer in the New York Police Department. DeVitto started learning to play the snare drum at school, and was given his cousin's old drum set aged about 11. However, he didn't become serious about drumming until he saw the Beatles perform on The Ed Sullivan Show in February 1964. He was also influenced as a teenager by rock drummer Dino Danelli.

== Career ==
Liberty DeVitto got his big break in the music business when he was hired to play drums for Billy Joel in the mid-1970s. In an online interview, DeVitto describes how Joel's classic late-1970s/early-1980s band first came together:

Billy and I used to play the same club in Plainview, Long Island called "My House." He was 17 and in a band called The Hassles and I was 16 and in a band called The New Rock Workshop. We would watch each other play and acknowledge each other in passing. In 1974, he was living in Los Angeles and had already released Piano Man and Streetlife Serenade. He used studio musicians for the recording and different guys out on the road. I was playing in a band called Topper with Doug Stegmeyer and he got the gig to play bass with Billy on the "Streetlife" tour. He told Doug that he wanted to move back to New York and find a permanent band he could record and tour with on a regular basis. Doug recommended me because Billy was looking for a New York-type drummer, aggressive and hard hitting, and the rest is history. The three of us recorded the basic tracks for Turnstiles and we both recommended Russell Javors and Howie Emerson, who played guitars in Topper and with the addition of Richie Cannata on saxophone, the "Billy Joel Band" was born.

In addition to working with Joel, DeVitto has also been an active session musician working with other big acts including Paul McCartney, Carly Simon, Phoebe Snow, Karen Carpenter, Stevie Nicks, Rick Wakeman, Bob James, and Meat Loaf. After working with Joel for 30 years, DeVitto was discharged from the 2006 Billy Joel tour for an unknown reason, and never played in Joel's band again. Up to that point he had the longest running tenure in Joel's band, starting with the recording of 1976's Turnstiles. As of 2018, DeVitto uses Liberty drums, pedals and hardware, Sabian cymbals, Evans drumheads, Latin Percussion, and Pro-Mark drumsticks.

DeVitto appeared on the November/December 2013 cover of Making Music magazine to discuss his life and career. Around that time he began collaborations with Brooklyn singer-songwriter Michael Sackler-Berner, which led to the founding of the band the Slim Kings alongside bassist Andy Attanasio. The Slim Kings released two albums and multiple singles. The band toured with ZZ Top and Los Lonely Boys. On October 23, 2014, DeVitto, Cannata, and Javors (with Stegmeyer, posthumously) were inducted into the Long Island Music Hall of Fame, primarily for their work with Joel. Shortly after that DeVitto, Cannata, and Javors officially formed the Lords of 52nd Street band; the band also includes a pianist and lead vocalist, keyboardist, and a guitarist, and plays faithful renditions of the recorded Joel originals. The Slim Kings were signed in 2024 to Universal Music Canada/Wax Records for their third full length LP Superlove released in 2025.

== Legal issues ==
On May 19, 2009, DeVitto filed a lawsuit in New York Supreme Court in Manhattan claiming that Joel and Sony Music owed him over 10 years worth of royalty payments. DeVitto had never been given songwriting credit on any of Joel's songs. DeVitto's lawyer said that he did not know exactly how much DeVitto was owed, and that Joel's record sales were subject to an audit. In April 2010, it was announced that Joel and DeVitto "amicably resolved" the lawsuit out of court. In 2020, DeVitto revealed in a radio interview that he and Joel had reconciled their friendship.

== Philanthropy ==
In 2003, DeVitto signed on as an official supporter of Little Kids Rock, a nonprofit organization that provides free musical instruments and instruction to children in underserved public schools throughout the United States. He has personally delivered instruments to children in the program, performed at benefit events for the cause and sits on the organization's Honorary Board of Directors.

== Personal life ==
DeVitto is the father of four daughters, including Devon (b. 1980), actress and model Torrey (b. 1984), and Maryelle (b. 1988).

In 2020, DeVitto's published a memoir, entitled Liberty: Life, Billy and the Pursuit of Happiness, for which Billy Joel wrote the foreword.

== See also ==
- Billy Joel Band
- The Lords of 52nd Street

== Credits ==
All albums listed are Billy Joel releases unless otherwise noted.

- 1976 Turnstiles
- 1977 The Stranger
- 1978 52nd Street
- 1980 Glass Houses
- 1981 Dead Ringer – with Meat Loaf
- 1981 The Burning – with Rick Wakeman
- 1981 Songs in the Attic
- 1982 The Nylon Curtain
- 1983 An Innocent Man
- 1985 Greatest Hits Volume I & II
- 1985 Spoiled Girl – with Carly Simon
- 1986 The Bridge
- 1987 Kohuept
- 1989 Storm Front
- 1989 Mick Jones – with Mick Jones
- 1993 River of Dreams
- 1996 Karen Carpenter – with Karen Carpenter (recorded in 1979–80)
- 1997 Greatest Hits Volume III
- 2001 Chiller Theatre – John Babcock
- 2007 Queen Anne's Revenge – with Sean J. Kennedy
- 2009 Camp Jam: Rock Solid Drums: Drums (Book/CD) – co-written with Sean J. Kennedy
- 2010 Gargoyles and Weathervanes – with The White Ravens
- 2011 Highlights from Piano Men—The Music of Elton and Billy – with The Southern Maine Symphony Orchestra
- 2011 I Used to Play Drums (Book/CD) – co-written with Sean J. Kennedy
- 2012 Fresh Socks – with The Slim Kings
- 2019 Expensive Habits - with The Slim Kings
- 2020 The King's County Classic - with The Slim Kings
- 2025 Superlove - with The Slim Kings
