= 52nd Street (album) =

Studio album by Billy Joel
- Released: October 11, 1978
- Recorded: July–August 1978
- Studios: A & R, New York City
- Genres: Rock; jazz rock
- Length: 40:26
- Label: Family Productions/Columbia
- Producer: Phil Ramone

Billy Joel chronology
The Stranger (1977)	52nd Street (1978)	Glass Houses (1980)

Singles from 52nd Street
- 1. "My Life" Released: October 1978; 2. "Big Shot" Released: January 1979; 3. "Until the Night" Released: March 1979 (UK); 4. "Honesty" Released: April 1979

52nd Street is the sixth studio album by the American singer-songwriter Billy Joel, released on October 11, 1978, by Columbia Records. It was the follow-up to his breakthrough studio album, The Stranger. Joel tried to give it a fresh sound, hiring various jazz musicians to differentiate it from his previous studio albums.

The album's title is a reference to 52nd Street, a popular street location in Midtown Manhattan for jazz musicians, beginning during the Great Depression and continuing through to the 1950s. Joel's label was headquartered within the CBS Building on West 52nd Street at the time of the album's release. The studio where recording took place, A&R Recording, was also on 52nd Street; the studio's freight elevator appears on the album cover.

52nd Street was an instant commercial success, becoming Joel's first album to reach number one on the Billboard 200, a spot it held for eight non-consecutive weeks. Three songs reached the Top 40 in the United States, contributing to the album's success: "My Life" (number 3), "Big Shot" (number 14), and "Honesty" (number 24). It was similarly well received by critics, earning two Grammy awards for Best Male Pop Vocal Performance and Album of the Year at the 22nd Annual Grammy Awards. The latter Grammy was presented to its producer, Phil Ramone. Upon Ramone's death, 52nd Street's Album of the Year Grammy was passed on to Joel.

The album was among the first commercially released on the compact disc format, reaching store shelves on October 1, 1982, in Japan. It was one of 50 CDs released that day by the CBS/Sony label, including The Stranger, but bore the first catalogue number in the sequence, 35DP-1, and so is frequently cited as the first to be released. In keeping with this history, it was also the first release when Sony returned to manufacturing vinyl records in 2018.

== Reception ==
Professional ratings
Review scores
Source	Rating
AllMusic	4/5 stars
Blender	4/5 stars
Christgau's Record Guide	B−
The Encyclopedia of Popular Music	3/5 stars
The Great Rock Discography	7/10
Record Mirror	4/5 stars
The Rolling Stone Album Guide	3/5 stars

Reviewing 52nd Street for The Village Voice in 1979, Robert Christgau noted Joel's talent for writing catchy songs and likened him to Elton John, albeit with more "smarm". The Globe and Mail determined that "the music really is starting to sound repetitive and formulaic—as though the songwriter's musical vocabulary is too limited to match his sense of the big city's varied dramas."

Retrospectively, AllMusic editor Stephen Thomas Erlewine praised Joel for expanding stylistically on 1977's The Stranger, describing 52nd Street as "more sophisticated and somewhat jazzy". In 2000, it was voted number 621 in Colin Larkin's All Time Top 1000 Albums. In 2003, 52nd Street was ranked number 352 on Rolling Stone magazine's list of "The 500 Greatest Albums of All Time", and at 354 on a 2012 revised list.

== Track listing ==
All songs written by Billy Joel.

Side one
No.	Title	Length
1.	"Big Shot"	4:03
2.	"Honesty"	3:52
3.	"My Life"	4:44
4.	"Zanzibar"	5:13

Side two
No.	Title	Length
1.	"Stiletto"	4:42
2.	"Rosalinda's Eyes"	4:41
3.	"Half a Mile Away"	4:08
4.	"Until the Night"	6:35
5.	"52nd Street"	2:27
Total length:		40:26

== Song notes ==
The song "Rosalinda's Eyes" was inspired by Joel's mother, Rosalind Nyman Joel.

The song "Big Shot" was inspired by a dinner with Bianca Jagger.

== Personnel ==
=== The Lords of 52nd Street ===
- Billy Joel – vocals, piano, Yamaha CP-70, Fender Rhodes, synthesizers
- Doug Stegmeyer – bass, backing vocals
- Liberty DeVitto – drums
- Richie Cannata – saxophones, clarinet, organ
- David Brown – electric guitar (3)
- Russell Javors – acoustic guitar (3)

==== Additional musicians ====
- Steve Khan – electric and acoustic guitars
- David Spinozza – acoustic guitar (2)
- Hugh McCracken – nylon guitar (6, 8)
- Eric Gale – electric guitar (7)
- Freddie Hubbard – trumpet (4)
- George Marge – sopranino recorder (6)
- Mike Mainieri – vibraphone and marimba (4, 6)
- Ralph MacDonald – percussion (6, 7)
- David Freidman – orchestral chimes and percussion (8)
- Robert Freedman – horn and string orchestrations (2, 8)
- Dave Grusin – horn orchestrations (7)
- David Nadien – concertmaster (2, 7, 8)
- Peter Cetera – backing vocals (3)
- Donnie Dacus – backing vocals (3)
- Frank Floyd – backing vocals (7)
- Babi Floyd – backing vocals (7)
- Milt Grayson – backing vocals (7)
- Zack Sanders – backing vocals (7)
- Ray Simpson – backing vocals (7)

=== Technical ===
- Produced by Phil Ramone
- Engineered by Jim Boyer
- Assistant engineer – David Martone
- Production associates – Kathy Kurs and Carol Peters
- Ted Jensen – mastering at Sterling Sound (New York City, NY)
- John Berg – cover design
- Jim Houghton – photography

== Accolades ==
=== Grammy Awards ===
Year	Nominee / work	Award	Result
1980	52nd Street	Album of the Year	Won
1980	52nd Street	Best Pop Vocal Performance – Male	Won
1980	"Honesty"	Song of the Year	Nominated

=== American Music Awards ===
Year	Nominee / work	Award	Result
1980	Billy Joel (performer)	Favorite Pop/Rock Male Artist	Nominated

== Charts ==
=== Weekly charts ===
Chart (1978–80)	Peak position
Australian (Kent Music Report)	1
Austrian Albums (Ö3 Austria)	4
Canadian Albums (RPM)	1
Dutch Albums (MegaCharts)	33
Finnish Albums (Suomen virallinen lista)	28
French Albums (SNEP)	2
Icelandic Albums (Tónlist)	2
Italian Albums (Musica e Dischi)	12
Japanese Albums (Oricon)	9
New Zealand Albums (RIANZ)	1
Norwegian Albums (VG-lista)	5
Spanish Albums (AFE)	13
Swedish Albums (Sverigetopplistan)	18
Swiss Albums (Schweizer Hitparade)	21
UK Albums (OCC)	10
US Billboard 200	1
West German Albums (Media Control)	19
Zimbabwean Albums (ZIMA)	3

=== Year-end charts ===
Chart (1978)	Position
Canadian Albums Chart (RPM)	48
Chart (1979)	Position
Australian Albums Chart	5
Austrian Albums Chart	17
Canadian Albums Chart	16
French Albums Chart	25
Japanese Albums Chart (Oricon)	14
New Zealand Albums Chart (RIANZ)	10
Norwegian Albums Chart (Vinter Period) (VG-lista)	7
UK Albums Chart	61
US Billboard 200	1
Chart (1980)	Position
Japanese Albums Chart	81

== Certifications and sales ==
Region	Certification	Certified units/sales
Australia (ARIA)	2× Platinum	100,000^{^}
Canada (Music Canada)	5× Platinum	500,000^{^}
France (SNEP)	Gold	100,000^{*}
Hong Kong (IFPI Hong Kong)	Gold	10,000^{*}
Japan (RIAJ)	Gold	470,000
New Zealand (RMNZ)	Platinum	15,000^{^}
United Kingdom (BPI)	Gold	100,000^{^}
United States (RIAA)	7× Platinum	7,000,000^{^}
^{*} Sales figures based on certification alone.^{^} Shipments figures based on certification alone.
