= Greatest Hits (Billy Joel albums) =

Compilation album by Billy Joel

Billy Joel's Greatest Hits is a collection released in two sets, 12 years apart. The first set, the two-disc Greatest Hits – Volume I & Volume II, was released in 1985. The second, a single disc titled Volume III was released in 1997. Additionally, a four-disc Complete Hits Collection was also released in 1997.

- Greatest Hits – Volume I & Volume II (1985)
- Greatest Hits Volume III (Billy Joel album) (1997)
- The Complete Hits Collection: 1973–1997 (1997)

== See also ==
- Billy Joel discography
