= Doug Stegmeyer =

American musician (1951–1995)

- Stegmeyer in 1976

Background information
- Born: Douglas Alan Stegmeyer; December 23, 1951; Flushing, Queens; New York, U.S.
- Origin: New York City
- Died: August 25, 1995 (aged 43) Smithtown, New York, U.S.
- Genres: Rock, pop
- Occupation: Musician
- Instruments: Bass, vocals
- Years active: 1966–1995
- Label: Columbia
- Formerly of: Topper

Douglas Alan Stegmeyer (December 23, 1951 – August 25, 1995) was an American musician who was best known as a bassist and back-up vocalist for Billy Joel. Stegmeyer also performed as bassist for Debbie Gibson and Hall & Oates.

== Life and career ==
Stegmeyer was born on December 23, 1951, in Flushing, Queens, New York City, New York. In high school, he met Russell Javors, who at age 15 was performing songs with childhood friend Liberty DeVitto. Along with Howard Emerson, the boys formed the band Topper, which performed songs by Javors and attracted Billy Joel's attention. Joel hired Stegmeyer to play bass in his backing band on the Streetlife Serenade tour. At Stegmeyer's recommendation a year and a half later, Emerson, Javors, and DeVitto joined Joel in the studio for his Turnstiles album and for the accompanying tour. Stegmeyer became a core member of Billy Joel's band, playing bass on Joel's studio albums from Turnstiles through The Bridge and on the live albums Songs in the Attic and Kohuept. Stegmeyer was dubbed "The Sergeant Of The Billy Joel Band".

Stegmeyer (and Javors) left the band in 1989; according to DeVitto, he was forced out. Stegmeyer subsequently maintained a busy schedule recording and producing.

On August 25, 1995, Stegmeyer died from a self-inflicted gunshot wound in his Smithtown, New York, home.

== Legacy ==
On October 23, 2014, Stegmeyer was posthumously inducted into the Long Island Music Hall of Fame, along with Topper and Joel bandmates Richie Cannata, DeVitto, and Javors. The four were inducted primarily for their work with Joel.

== See also ==
- Billy Joel Band

== Credits ==
With Billy Joel

- 1976 Turnstiles
- 1977 The Stranger
- 1978 52nd Street
- 1980 Glass Houses
- 1982 The Nylon Curtain
- 1983 An Innocent Man
- 1986 The Bridge

With Phoebe Snow

- 1978 Against the Grain
- 1981 Rock Away

With Melanie

- 1983 Seventh Wave

With Hall & Oates

- 1990 Change of Season

With Debbie Gibson

- 1990 Anything Is Possible
