= Building Empires Tour =

1990–92 concert tour by Queensrÿche

- Tour by Queensrÿche
- Poster with the November 1990 tour dates
- Associated album: Empire
- Start date: October 29, 1990
- End date: January 3, 1992
- No. of shows: 170

Queensrÿche concert chronology
- Operation: Mindcrime Tour (1988–89); Building Empires Tour (1990–92); The Road to the Promised Land Tour (1995)

The Building Empires Tour was a concert tour by American progressive metal band Queensrÿche in support of their latest album Empire. The setlist consisted of the band performing their album Operation: Mindcrime in full. Suicidal Tendencies and Warrior Soul supported the band throughout North America.

== Set list ==
1. "Resistance"
2. "Walk in the Shadows"
3. "Best I Can"
4. "Hand on Heart" (Dropped after November 15, 1990)
5. "Empire"
6. "The Thin Line"
7. "Jet City Woman"
8. "Another Rainy Night (Without You)" (Starting on October 17, 1991)
9. "Roads to Madness"
10. "I Remember Now"
11. "Anarchy-X"
12. "Revolution Calling"
13. "Operation: Mindcrime"
14. "Speak"
15. "Spreading the Disease"
16. "The Mission"
17. "Suite Sister Mary"
18. "The Needle Lies"
19. "Electric Requiem"
20. "Breaking the Silence"
21. "I Don't Believe in Love"
22. "Waiting for 22"
23. "My Empty Room"
24. "Eyes of a Stranger"
25. "Della Brown" (Starting on November 8, 1991)
26. "Last Time in Paris" (Starting on July 21, 1991)
27. "Silent Lucidity"
28. "Take Hold of the Flame" (Dropped after July 21, 1991)

== Tour Dates ==
Date	City	Country	Venue
Europe
October 29, 1990	Dublin	Ireland	SFX Hall
October 31, 1990	Belfast	Northern Ireland	Ulster Hall
November 1, 1990	Edinburgh	Scotland	Edinburgh Playhouse
November 2, 1990	Newcastle upon Tyne	England	Newcastle City Hall
November 4, 1990	Nottingham	England	Nottingham Royal Concert Hall
November 5, 1990	Bradford	England	St. George's Hall
November 6, 1990	Liverpool	England	Royal Court Theatre
November 8, 1990	Newport	Wales	Newport Centre
November 9, 1990	Poole	England	Poole Arts Centre
November 11, 1990	Manchester	England	Manchester Apollo
November 12, 1990	Aston	England	Aston Villa Leisure Centre
November 14, 1990	London	England	Hammersmith Odeon
November 15, 1990	London	England	Hammersmith Odeon
November 18, 1990	Hamburg	Germany	Große Freiheit 36
November 19, 1990	Bonn	Germany	Biskuithalle
November 20, 1990	Ichtegem	Belgium	Sporthal Ichtegem
November 22, 1990	Hannover	Germany	Hannover Music Hall
November 23, 1990	Neumarkt in der Oberpfalz	Germany	Jurahalle
November 24, 1990	Wertheim	Germany	Main-Tauber-Halle
November 26, 1990	Unterföhring	Germany	Theaterfabrik
November 27, 1990	Ludwigsburg	Germany	Forum Am Schlosspark
November 29, 1990	Amsterdam	Netherlands	Jaap Edenhal
November 30, 1990	Paris	France	Élysée Montmartre
December 2, 1990	Senden	Germany	Gorki Park
December 3, 1990	Zürich	Switzerland	Volkshaus
December 5, 1990	Florence	Italy	Palasport
December 6, 1990	Milan	Italy	Rolling Stone
Rock in Rio
January 23, 1991	Rio de Janeiro	Brazil	Rock in Rio
Japan
January 29, 1991	Tokyo	Japan	NHK Hall
February 1, 1991	Osaka	Japan	Osaka Festival Hall
February 3, 1991	Tokyo	Japan	NHK Hall
February 4, 1991	Tokyo	Japan	NHK Hall
February 5, 1991	Yokohama	Japan	Yokohama Cultural Gymnasium
North America I
April 15, 1991	Amarillo	United States	Amarillo Civic Center
April 17, 1991	El Paso	United States	UTEP Special Events Center
April 19, 1991	Houston	United States	The Summit
April 20, 1991	Dallas	United States	Reunion Arena
April 21, 1991	Lubbock	United States	Lubbock Municipal Coliseum
April 23, 1991	Odessa	United States	Ector County Coliseum
April 24, 1991	San Antonio	United States	Freeman Coliseum
April 25, 1991	Austin	United States	Frank Erwin Center
April 27, 1991	New Orleans	United States	UNO Lakefront Arena
April 29, 1991	Valley Center	United States	Britt Brown Arena
April 30, 1991	Oklahoma City	United States	Myriad Convention Center
May 1, 1991	Tulsa	United States	Expo Square Pavilion
May 3, 1991	St. Louis	United States	St. Louis Arena
May 4, 1991	Kansas City	United States	Kansas City Municipal Auditorium
May 5, 1991	Omaha	United States	Omaha Civic Auditorium
May 7, 1991	Duluth	United States	Duluth Arena
May 8, 1991	Minneapolis	United States	Target Center
May 10, 1991	Madison	United States	Dane County Coliseum
May 11, 1991	Milwaukee	United States	MECCA Arena
May 12, 1991	La Crosse	United States	La Crosse Center
May 14, 1991	Cedar Rapids	United States	Five Seasons Center
May 15, 1991	Des Moines	United States	Iowa Veterans Memorial Auditorium
May 17, 1991	Rosemont	United States	Rosemont Horizon
May 18, 1991	Green Bay	United States	Brown County Veterans Memorial Arena
May 19, 1991	Indianapolis	United States	Market Square Arena
May 21, 1991	Toledo	United States	Toledo Sports Arena
May 22, 1991	Louisville	United States	Louisville Gardens
May 24, 1991	Columbus	United States	Battelle Hall
May 25, 1991	Richfield	United States	Richfield Coliseum
May 26, 1991	Saginaw	United States	Saginaw Civic Center
May 28, 1991	Peoria	United States	Peoria Civic Center
May 29, 1991	Evansville	United States	Roberts Municipal Stadium
May 31, 1991	Kalamazoo	United States	Wings Stadium
June 1, 1991	Detroit	United States	Joe Louis Arena
June 2, 1991	Fort Wayne	United States	Allen County War Memorial Coliseum
June 4, 1991	Trotwood	United States	Hara Arena
June 5, 1991	Pittsburgh	United States	Pittsburgh Civic Arena
June 7, 1991	Rochester	United States	Rochester Community War Memorial
June 8, 1991	Buffalo	United States	Buffalo Memorial Auditorium
June 19, 1991	Little Rock	United States	Barton Coliseum
June 21, 1991	Shreveport	United States	Hirsch Memorial Coliseum
June 22, 1991	Jackson	United States	Mississippi Coliseum
June 23, 1991	Birmingham	United States	BJCC Coliseum
June 25, 1991	Huntsville	United States	Von Braun Civic Center
June 26, 1991	Memphis	United States	Mid-South Coliseum
June 28, 1991	Chattanooga	United States	UTC Arena
June 30, 1991	Atlanta	United States	The Omni Coliseum
July 2, 1991	St. Petersberg	United States	Bayfront Center
July 3, 1991	Miami	United States	Miami Arena
July 5, 1991	Orlando	United States	Orlando Arena
July 6, 1991	Jacksonville	United States	Jacksonville Memorial Coliseum
July 7, 1991	Pensacola	United States	Pensacola Civic Center
July 9, 1991	Nashville	United States	Nashville Municipal Auditorium
July 10, 1991	Knoxville	United States	Knoxville Civic Coliseum
July 12, 1991	Charlotte	United States	Charlotte Coliseum
July 13, 1991	Greensboro	United States	Greensboro Coliseum
July 14, 1991	Columbia	United States	Carolina Coliseum
July 16, 1991	Norfolk	United States	Norfolk Scope
July 17, 1991	Richmond	United States	Richmond Coliseum
July 19, 1991	Fairfax	United States	Patriot Center
July 20, 1991	Binghamton	United States	Broome County Veterans Memorial Arena
July 21, 1991	Portland	United States	Cumberland County Civic Center
July 23, 1991	Philadelphia	United States	The Spectrum
July 24, 1991	East Rutherford	United States	Brendan Byrne Arena
July 26, 1991	Uniondale	United States	Nassau Veterans Memorial Coliseum
July 27, 1991	Worcester	United States	The Centrum
July 28, 1991	Albany	United States	Knickerbocker Arena
July 30, 1991	Providence	United States	Providence Civic Center
July 31, 1991	Hartford	United States	Hartford Civic Center
Monsters of Rock
August 10, 1991	Gentofte	Denmark	Gentofte Stadion
August 13, 1991	Chorzów	Poland	Silesian Stadium
August 17, 1991	Castle Donington	England	Donington Park
August 22, 1991	Budapest	Hungary	Népstadion
August 24, 1991	Munich	Germany	Galopprennbahn Riem
August 25, 1991	Basel	Switzerland	St. Jakob Stadium
August 27, 1991	Berlin	Germany	Waldbühne
August 28, 1991	Berlin	Germany	Waldbühne
August 30, 1991	Hasselt	Belgium	Kiewit Airfield
August 31, 1991	Hannover	Germany	Niedersachsenstadion
September 1, 1991	Nijmegen	Netherlands	Stadion de Goffert
September 7, 1991	Mainz	Germany	Mainz-Finthen Airport
September 8, 1991	Oldenburg	Germany	Weser-Ems Halle
September 11, 1991	Graz	Austria	Liebenauer Stadium
September 14, 1991	Modena	Italy	Festa de l'Unità
September 17, 1991	Dortmund	Germany	Westfalenhalle
September 18, 1991	Dortmund	Germany	Westfalenhalle
September 21, 1991	Paris	France	Hippodrome de Vincennes
North America III
October 12, 1991	Oakland	United States	Day on the Green
October 17, 1991	Edmonton	Canada	Northlands Coliseum
October 18, 1991	Calgary	Canada	Olympic Saddledome
October 21, 1991	Winnipeg	Canada	Winnipeg Arena
October 22, 1991	Fargo	United States	Bison Sports Arena
October 24, 1991	Toronto	Canada	Maple Leaf Gardens
October 25, 1991	Auburn Hills	United States	The Palace of Auburn Hills
October 27, 1991	Quebec City	Canada	Colisee de Quebec
October 28, 1991	Ottawa	Canada	Ottawa Civic Centre
October 29, 1991	Montreal	Canada	Montreal Forum
October 31, 1991	Bangor	United States	Bangor Auditorium
November 1, 1991	Halifax	Canada	Halifax Metro Centre
November 3, 1991	Bethlehem	United States	Stabler Arena
November 4, 1991	Syracuse	United States	Onondaga County War Memorial
November 5, 1991	Boston	United States	Boston Garden
November 7, 1991	Baltimore	United States	Baltimore Arena
November 8, 1991	Hershey	United States	Hersheypark Arena
November 9, 1991	Charleston	United States	Charleston Civic Center
November 11, 1991	Johnstown	United States	Cambria County War Memorial Arena
November 12, 1991	Wheeling	United States	Wheeling Civic Center
November 13, 1991	Cincinnati	United States	Cincinnati Gardens
November 15, 1991	Lexington	United States	Rupp Arena
November 17, 1991	Muskegon	United States	L.C. Walker Arena
November 18, 1991	Springfield	United States	Prairie Capital Convention Center
November 19, 1991	Rochester	United States	Mayo Civic Center
November 21, 1991	Manhattan	United States	Bramlage Coliseum
November 22, 1991	Sioux Falls	United States	Sioux Falls Arena
November 24, 1991	Denver	United States	McNichols Sports Arena
November 25, 1991	Denver	United States	McNichols Sports Arena
November 27, 1991	Las Vegas	United States	Thomas & Mack Center
November 29, 1991	Sacramento	United States	ARCO Arena
November 30, 1991	Daly City	United States	Cow Palace
December 1, 1991	Reno	United States	Lawlor Events Center
December 4, 1991	Boise	United States	BSU Pavilion
December 5, 1991	Salt Lake City	United States	Salt Palace
December 7, 1991	Albuquerque	United States	Tingley Coliseum
December 9, 1991	San Diego	United States	San Diego Sports Arena
December 10, 1991	Tucson	United States	Tucson Convention Center
December 11, 1991	Phoenix	United States	Arizona Veterans Memorial Coliseum
December 12, 1991	Long Beach	United States	Long Beach Arena
December 13, 1991	Long Beach	United States	Long Beach Arena
December 14, 1991	Long Beach	United States	Long Beach Arena
December 15, 1991	Long Beach	United States	Long Beach Arena
December 28, 1991	Vancouver	Canada	Pacific Coliseum
December 30, 1991	Portland	United States	Portland Memorial Coliseum
December 31, 1991	Seattle	United States	Seattle Center Coliseum
January 1, 1992	Seattle	United States	Seattle Center Coliseum
January 3, 1992	Spokane	United States	Spokane Coliseum
