= Spirits Dancing in the Flesh Tour =

1990 concert tour by Santana

- Tour by Santana
- The cover of the tour book of the European tour.
- Associated album: Spirits Dancing in the Flesh
- Start date: March 17, 1990
- End date: November 21, 1990
- Legs: 3
- No. of shows: 80 in North America; 25 in Europe; 105 in total

Santana concert chronology
- Viva Santana! Tour (1988–89); Spirits Dancing in the Flesh Tour (1990); A 25–Year Celebration Tour (1991)

The Spirits Dancing in the Flesh Tour was the twenty-fourth concert tour by Santana in 1990, supporting the Spirits Dancing in the Flesh album.

== Tour band ==
- Alex Ligertwood – lead vocals, rhythm guitar
- Carlos Santana – lead guitar, percussion, vocals
- Chester D. Thompson – keyboards
- Benny Rietveld – bass guitar
- Walfredo Reyes Jr. – drums
- Armando Peraza – congas, percussion (through October)
- Raul Rekow – congas, bongos, percussion, vocals (beginning October)

== Set list ==
The tour lasted from March 17 at the San Francisco Civic Auditorium in San Francisco, California to November 21 at the Bayfront Auditorium in Pensacola, Florida. An average set list of this tour was as follows:

1. "Spirits Dancing in the Flesh" (Carlos Santana, Chester D. Thompson)
2. "Somewhere in Heaven" (Alex Ligertwood, Santana)
3. "It's a Jungle Out There" (Santana)
4. "The Healer" (John Lee Hooker, Roy Rogers, Santana, Chester Thompson)
5. "Batuka" (José Areas, David Brown, Michael Carabello, Gregg Rolie, Michael Shrieve)
6. "No One to Depend On" (Carabello, Coke Escovedo, Rolie, Willie Bobo, Melvin Lastie)
7. "We Don't Have to Wait" (Santana, Armando Peraza, Thompson)
8. "Black Magic Woman" (Peter Green)
9. "Gypsy Queen" (Gábor Szabó)
10. "Oye Como Va" (Tito Puente)
11. "Peace on Earth...Mother Earth...Third Stone from the Sun" (John Coltrane, Santana, Jimi Hendrix)
12. "Mandela" (Peraza)
13. "Savor" (Areas, Brown, Carabello, Rolie, Santana, Shrieve)
14. "Choose" (Santana, Thompson, Ligertwood)
15. "She's Not There" (Rod Argent)
16. "Toussaint L'Overture" (Areas, Brown, Carabello, Rolie, Santana, Shrieve)
17. "Europa (Earth's Cry Heaven's Smile)" (Tom Coster, Santana)

Encore

18. "Soul Sacrifice" (Santana, Rolie, Brown, Marcus Malone)
19. "Jin-go-lo-ba" (Babatunde Olatunji)

== Tour dates ==
=== U.S. leg (March 17 – May 26) ===
List of tour dates with date, city, country, venue
Date (1990)	City	Country	Venue
March 17 (Note: The concert on March 17 was a part of the Bammies.)	San Francisco	United States	San Francisco Civic Auditorium
April 12	Spokane	United States	Spokane Opera House
April 14	Portland	United States	Arlene Schnitzer Concert Hall
April 16	Eugene	United States	Cuthbert Amphitheater
April 17	Eureka	United States	Eureka Municipal Auditorium
April 18	San Francisco	United States	Warfield Theatre
April 19	Santa Cruz	United States	Santa Cruz Civic Auditorium
April 21	Reno	United States	Lawlor Events Center
April 23	Stockton	United States	Stockton Memorial Civic Auditorium
April 24	Fresno	United States	Warnors Theatre
April 25	Santa Cruz	United States	Santa Cruz Civic Auditorium
April 27	Las Vegas	United States	Aladdin Theatre for the Performing Arts
April 28	San Luis Obispo	United States	Mustang Stadium
April 29	Santa Barbara	United States	Santa Barbara Bowl
May 26 (Note: The concert on May 26 was a part of the Miami International Music Festival.)	Miami	United States	Bayfront Park

=== European leg (May 29 – June 30) ===
List of tour dates with date, city, country, venue
Date (1990)	City	Country	Venue
May 29	Bournemouth	England	Bournemouth International Centre
May 30	London	England	Hammersmith Odeon
May 31	London	England	Hammersmith Odeon
June 1	London	England	Hammersmith Odeon
June 3	Manchester	England	Manchester Apollo
June 6	Brussels	Belgium	Cirque Royal
June 7	Arnhem	Netherlands	Rijnhal
June 8	Neumarkt in der Oberpfalz	West Germany	Jurahalle
June 9	Jübek	West Germany	Sandbahn-Stadion
June 11	Koblenz	West Germany	Rhein-Mosel-Halle
June 13	Heilbronn	West Germany	Eissporthalle
June 14	Pforzheim	West Germany	Stadthalle
June 15	Mannheim	West Germany	Mannheimer Rosengarten
June 16	Bad Staffelstein	West Germany	Adam-Riese-Halle
June 17	Paris	France	Zénith de Paris
June 19	Toulouse	France	Palais des Sports
June 20	Bordeaux	France	Patinoire de Mériadeck
June 22	Lyon	France	Festival Eclanova
June 23 (Note: The concert on June 23 was a part of Les Eurockéennes de Belfort 1990.)	Belfort	France	Presqu'île de Malsaucy
June 25 (Note: The concerts on June 25–26 were a part of the Istanbul International Jazz Festival.)	Istanbul	Turkey	—N/a
June 26	Istanbul	Turkey	—N/a
June 27	Budapest	Hungary	Kisstadion
June 28	Vienna	Austria	Arena
June 29	Imst	Austria	Open Air Stadtplatz
June 30 (Note: The concert on June 30 was a part of Open Air St. Gallen.)	St. Gallen	Switzerland	Sittertobel

=== North American leg (July 13 – November 21) ===
List of tour dates with date, city, country, venue
Date (1990)	City	Country	Venue
July 13	Los Angeles	United States	Greek Theatre
July 14	Los Angeles	United States	Greek Theatre
July 15	Los Angeles	United States	Greek Theatre
July 17	Santa Fe	United States	Paolo Soleri Amphitheater
July 18	Santa Fe	United States	Paolo Soleri Amphitheater
July 20	Dallas	United States	Coca-Cola Starplex Amphitheatre
July 21	The Woodlands	United States	Cynthia Woods Mitchell Pavilion
July 22	San Antonio	United States	Sunken Garden Theater
July 24	New Orleans	United States	Saenger Theatre
July 26	Nashville	United States	Starwood Amphitheatre
July 27	Pelham	United States	Oak Mountain Amphitheatre
July 28	San Juan	Puerto Rico	Roberto Clemente Coliseum
August 4	New York City	United States	Electric Lady Studios
August 5	Syracuse	United States	Empire Court
August 6	Darien Center	United States	Darien Lake Performing Arts Center
August 8	Mansfield	United States	Great Woods Center for the Performing Arts
August 9	Montreal	Canada	La Ronde
August 11	Bristol	United States	Lake Compounce
August 12	Wantagh	United States	Jones Beach Marine Theater
August 14	Holmdel Township	United States	Garden State Arts Center
August 15	Stanhope	United States	Waterloo Village
August 16	Columbia	United States	Merriweather Post Pavilion
August 17	Cleveland	United States	Nautica Stage
August 18	Detroit	United States	Fox Theatre
August 21	Pittsburgh	United States	Coca-Cola Star Lake Amphitheater
August 22	Harrisburg	United States	City Island
August 23	Richmond	United States	Mosque Theatre
August 24	Atlantic City	United States	Trump Taj Mahal
August 26	Chicago	United States	Poplar Creek Music Theatre
August 28	Columbus	United States	Palace Theatre
August 30	Milwaukee	United States	Riverside Theater
September 1	Kansas City	United States	Barney Allis Plaza
September 2	Greenwood Village	United States	Fiddler's Green Amphitheatre
September 15	Costa Mesa	United States	Pacific Amphitheatre
September 16	Berkeley	United States	William Randolph Hearst Greek Theatre
September 22 (Note: The concert on June 30 was a part of the John Coltrane Festival.)	Los Angeles	United States	Wiltern Theatre
October 5	Stateline	United States	Caesars Tahoe
October 6 (2 shows)	Stateline	United States	Caesars Tahoe
October 7	San Jose	United States	Event Center Arena
October 9 (2 shows)	Fresno	United States	Fresno Fairgrounds
October 11	San Diego	United States	Starlight Bowl
October 12	Phoenix	United States	Arizona Veterans Memorial Coliseum
October 13	Tucson	United States	Pima County Fairgrounds
October 14	El Paso	United States	Special Events Center
October 16	Lubbock	United States	Lubbock Municipal Auditorium
October 18	Wichita	United States	Cotillion Ballroom
October 19	Tulsa	United States	Brady Theater
October 20	Dallas	United States	Cotton Bowl
November 2	Boston	United States	Orpheum Theatre
November 3	Newark	United States	Golden Dome Athletic Center
November 5	New York City	United States	Beacon Theatre
November 6	New York City	United States	Beacon Theatre
November 7	New York City	United States	Beacon Theatre
November 9	Upper Darby Township	United States	Tower Theater
November 10	Upper Darby Township	United States	Tower Theater
November 11	Norfolk	United States	Chrysler Hall
November 13	Indianapolis	United States	Murat Theatre
November 15	Atlanta	United States	Fox Theatre
November 16	Cocoa	United States	Brevard County Fairgrounds
November 17	Sunrise	United States	Sunrise Musical Theater
November 18	Sunrise	United States	Sunrise Musical Theater
November 20	St. Petersburg	United States	Mahaffey Theater
November 21	Pensacola	United States	Bayfront Auditorium

== Box office score data ==
List of box office score data with date, city, venue, attendance, gross, references
Date (1990)	City	Venue	Attendance	Gross	Ref(s)
July 13	Los Angeles, United States	Greek Theatre	18,544 / 18,544	$407,523	
July 14	Los Angeles, United States	Greek Theatre	18,544 / 18,544	$407,523	
July 15	Los Angeles, United States	Greek Theatre	18,544 / 18,544	$407,523	
September 15	Costa Mesa, United States	Pacific Amphitheatre	9,371 / 11,000	$209,468	
October 20	Dallas, United States	Cotton Bowl	74,100 / 74,100	$1,715,688	
November 5	New York City, United States	Beacon Theatre	8,133 / 8,133	$203,325	
November 6	New York City, United States	Beacon Theatre	8,133 / 8,133	$203,325	
November 7	New York City, United States	Beacon Theatre	8,133 / 8,133	$203,325	
November 9	Upper Darby Township, United States	Tower Theater	5,882 / 5,882	$109,220	
November 10	Upper Darby Township, United States	Tower Theater	5,882 / 5,882	$109,220	
November 17	Sunrise, United States	Sunrise Musical Theater	7,354 / 7,354	$145,261	
November 18	Sunrise, United States	Sunrise Musical Theater	7,354 / 7,354	$145,261	
TOTAL			123,384 / 125,013 (99%)	$2,790,485	
