= A 25–Year Celebration Tour =

1991 concert tour by Santana

- Tour by Santana
- The cover of the Japanese tour program.
- Start date: January 19, 1991
- End date: November 3, 1991
- Legs: 8
- No. of shows: 32 in North America; 16 in Europe; 6 in Asia; 3 in South America; 57 in total

Santana concert chronology
- Spirits Dancing in the Flesh Tour (1990); A 25–Year Celebration Tour (1991); Milagro Tour (1992–93)

A 25–Year Celebration Tour was the twenty-fifth concert tour by Santana in 1991, celebrating their 25th anniversary as a band.

== Tour band ==
- Alex Ligertwood – lead vocals, rhythm guitar (through April)
- Tony Lindsay – lead vocals (beginning April)
- Carlos Santana – lead guitar, percussion, vocals
- Chester D. Thompson – keyboards
- Benny Rietveld – bass guitar
- Walfredo Reyes Jr. – drums (through April)
- Gaylord Birch – drums (from April to June)
- Billy Johnson – drums (beginning June)
- Raul Rekow – congas, bongos, percussion, vocals
- Karl Perazzo – timbales, percussion, vocals (beginning April)

== Set list ==
The tour began on January 19 at the Rock in Rio II festival within the Maracanã Stadium in Rio de Janeiro, Brazil and ended on November 3 at a Bill Graham memorial concert at the Polo Fields in San Francisco, California. This is an average set list of this tour:

1. "Mandela" (Armando Peraza)
2. "It's a Jungle Out There" (Carlos Santana)
3. "Somewhere in Heaven" (Alex Ligertwood, Santana)
4. "Life Is for Living" (Pat Sefolosha)
5. "Batuka" (José Areas, David Brown, Michael Carabello, Gregg Rolie, Michael Shrieve)
6. "No One to Depend On" (Carabello, Coke Escovedo, Rolie, Willie Bobo, Melvin Lastie)
7. "We Don't Have to Wait" (Santana, Armando Peraza, Thompson)
8. "Black Magic Woman" (Peter Green)
9. "Gypsy Queen" (Gábor Szabó)
10. "Oye Como Va" (Tito Puente)
11. "Right On" (Marvin Gaye, Earl DeRouen)
12. "Peace on Earth...Mother Earth...Third Stone from the Sun" (John Coltrane, Santana, Jimi Hendrix)
13. "Save the Children" (Bobby Womack)
14. "Savor" (Areas, Brown, Carabello, Rolie, Santana, Shrieve)
15. "Blues for Salvador" (Santana, Chester D. Thompson)
16. "Europa (Earth's Cry Heaven's Smile)" (Tom Coster, Santana)

Encore

17. "Jin-go-lo-ba" (Babatunde Olatunji)

== Tour dates ==
=== Brazilian leg (January 19–24) ===
List of tour dates with date, city, country, venue
Date (1991)	City	Country	Venue
January 19 (Note: The concerts on January 19 and 24 were a part of Rock in Rio II.)	Rio de Janeiro	Brazil	Estádio Jornalista Mário Filho
January 24	Rio de Janeiro	Brazil	Estádio Jornalista Mário Filho

=== U.S. leg (April 27 – May 11) ===
List of tour dates with date, city, country, venue
Date (1991)	City	Country	Venue
April 27	Las Vegas	United States	Sam Boyd Silver Bowl
April 28	Las Vegas	United States	Sam Boyd Silver Bowl
April 30	San Francisco	United States	Warfield Theatre
May 1	San Francisco	United States	Warfield Theatre
May 10	Honolulu	United States	Waikiki Shell
May 11	Lahaina	United States	Royal Lahaina Tennis Stadium

=== Japan leg (May 15–22) ===
List of tour dates with date, city, country, venue
Date (1991)	City	Country	Venue
May 15	Osaka	Japan	Festival Hall
May 17	Fukuoka	Japan	Fukuoka Sunpalace
May 18	Amagasaki	Japan	Amagasaki-shi Sougou Bunka Center
May 19	Nagoya	Japan	Nagoya Civic Assembly Hall
May 21	Tokyo	Japan	Nippon Budokan
May 22	Yokohama	Japan	Kanagawa Kenmin Hall

=== U.S. leg (May 25–26) ===
List of tour dates with date, city, country, venue
Date (1991)	City	Country	Venue
May 25	George	United States	Champs de Brionne Music Theatre
May 26	Portland	United States	Portland Civic Auditorium

=== Aruban show (June 16) ===
List of tour dates with date, city, country, venue
Date (1991)	City	Country	Venue
June 16	Oranjestad	Aruba	Don Elias Mansur Ballpark

=== North American leg (June 20–28) ===
List of tour dates with date, city, country, venue
Date (1991)	City	Country	Venue
June 20	Los Angeles	United States	Greek Theatre
June 21	Los Angeles	United States	Greek Theatre
June 22	Los Angeles	United States	Greek Theatre
June 25	Mexico City	Mexico	Palacio de los Deportes
June 26	Mexico City	Mexico	Palacio de los Deportes
June 28	Denver	United States	Mile High Stadium

=== European leg (July 7–27) ===
List of tour dates with date, city, country, venue
Date (1991)	City	Country	Venue
July 7	Paris	France	Zénith de Paris
July 9	Athens	Greece	Leoforos Alexandras Stadium
July 10	London	England	Wembley Arena
July 12	Aschaffenburg	Germany	Unterfrankenhalle
July 13 (Note: The concert on July 13 was a part of the Leysin Festival.)	Leysin	Switzerland	Place des Feuilles
July 14	Landshut	Germany	ETSV Sporthalle
July 15	Vienna	Austria	Praterstadion
July 17	Cologne	Germany	Tanzbrunnen
July 18	Hamburg	Germany	Freilichtbühne
July 19	Aalborg	Denmark	Provstejorden
July 20	Copenhagen	Denmark	Valby Idrætspark
July 21	Odense	Denmark	Odense University
July 23	Vienne	France	Théâtre Antique
July 24 (Note: The concert on July 24 was a part of Jazz à Juan.)	Juan-les-Pins	France	La Pinède Gould
July 25 (Note: The concert on July 25 was a part of Heineken Jazzaldia.)	San Sebastián	Spain	Velódromo de Anoeta
July 27	Lisbon	Portugal	Estádio José Alvalade

=== North American leg (August 30 – November 3) ===
List of tour dates with date, city, country, venue
Date (1991)	City	Country	Venue
August 30	Santa Fe	United States	Paolo Soleri Amphitheater
August 31 (2 shows)	Santa Fe	United States	Paolo Soleri Amphitheater
September 1	Tucson	United States	Pima County Fairgrounds
September 2	Mesa	United States	Mesa Amphitheatre
September 4	Burbank	United States	Starlight Bowl
September 6	Costa Mesa	United States	Pacific Amphitheatre
September 7	Santa Barbara	United States	Santa Barbara Bowl
September 8	Berkeley	United States	William Randolph Hearst Greek Theatre
September 25	Houston	United States	Ripley House
September 26	Detroit	United States	Fox Theatre
September 27	Toronto	Canada	Massey Hall
September 28	Syracuse	United States	Carrier Dome
October 1	Springfield	United States	Springfield Civic Center
October 2	Burlington	United States	Burlington Memorial Auditorium
October 4	New York City	United States	Paramount Theater
October 5	New York City	United States	Palladium
October 6	Philadelphia	United States	Fairmount Park
October 30	Mill Valley	United States	Sweetwater
November 3 (Note: The concert on November 3 was a part of Bill Graham Memorial: Laughter, Love and Music.)	San Francisco	United States	Polo Fields

== Box office score data ==
List of box office score data with date, city, venue, attendance, gross, references
Date (1991)	City	Venue	Attendance	Gross	Ref(s)
April 27	Las Vegas, United States	Sam Boyd Silver Bowl	79,000 / 79,000	$1,856,500	
April 28	Las Vegas, United States	Sam Boyd Silver Bowl	79,000 / 79,000	$1,856,500	
June 20	Los Angeles, United States	Greek Theatre	17,123 / 17,532	$394,379	
June 21	Los Angeles, United States	Greek Theatre	17,123 / 17,532	$394,379	
June 22	Los Angeles, United States	Greek Theatre	17,123 / 17,532	$394,379	
September 28	Syracuse, United States	Carrier Dome	25,000 / 25,000	$562,500	
TOTAL			121,123 / 121,532 (99%)	$2,813,379	
