= Best I Can =

Best I Can may refer to:

- "Best I Can" (Rush song)
- "Best I Can" (Queensrÿche song), 1990
