= Palacio de los Deportes =

Arena in Mexico City, Mexico

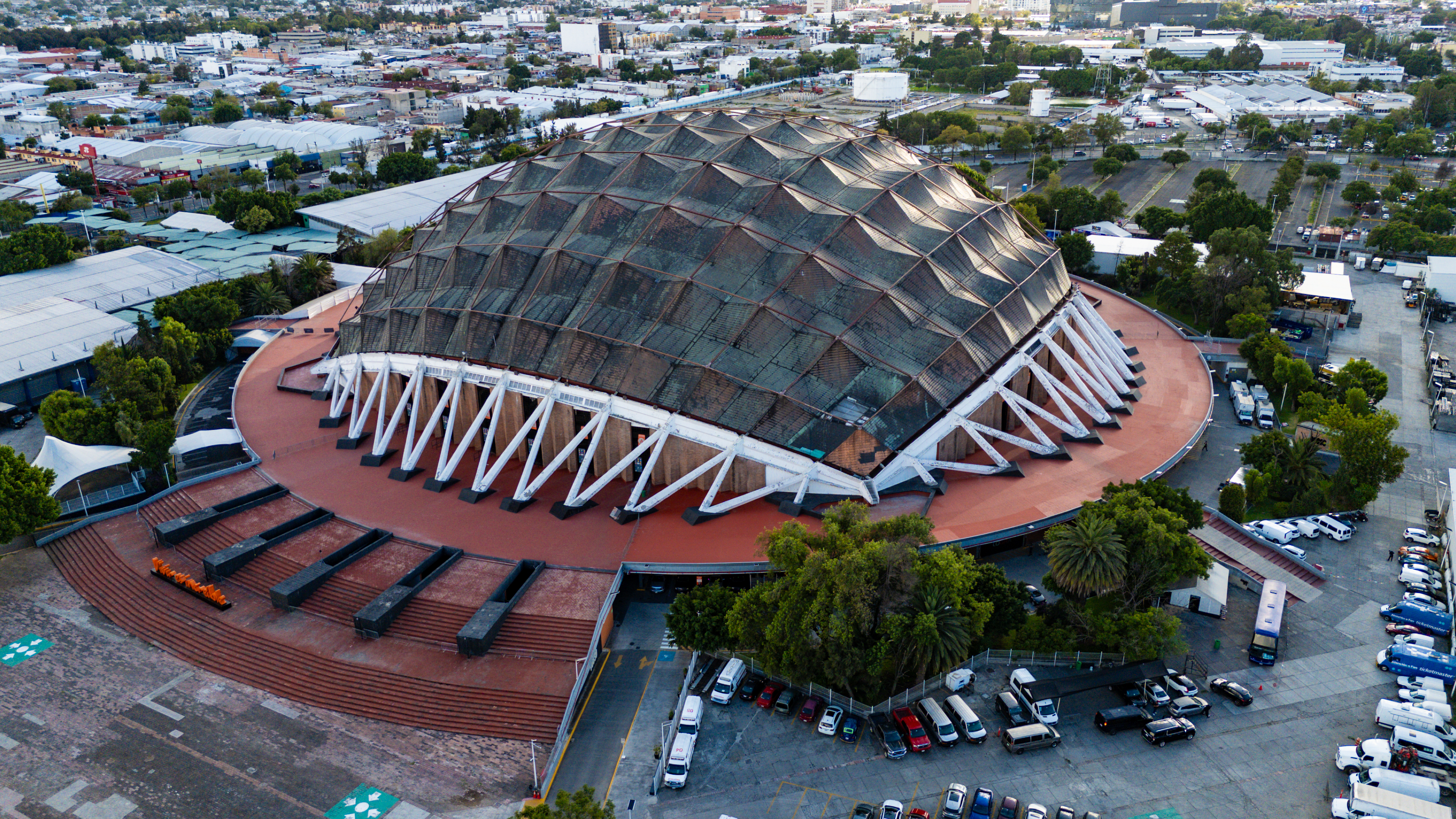
- Aerial shot of Palacio de los Deportes
- Interactive map of Palacio de los Deportes
- Location: Mexico City, Mexico
- Coordinates: 19°24′19″N 99°5′59″W
- Owner: Mexico City's Government
- Operator: Grupo CIE
- Capacity: 20,000 (arena); 26,000 (concert hall)

Construction
- Groundbreaking: October 15, 1966
- Built: September 1968
- Opened: October 8, 1968
- Architects: Félix Candela; Antonio Peyri; Enrique Castañeda Tamborel

Tenants
- Mexico City Aztecas (CBA) (1994–1995); Mexico Toros (CISL) (1995)

Palacio de los Deportes (English: Sports Palace) is an indoor arena located in Mexico City, Mexico. It is within the Magdalena Mixhuca Sports City complex, near the Mexico City International Airport and in front of the Estadio GNP Seguros, in which sports and artistic events are also celebrated. It is operated by Grupo CIE. The palace is named after Mexican military official Juan Escutia, although it is rarely referred to in its full name.

The stadium was constructed for the 1968 Summer Olympics and opened in 1968. The arena currently has 17,800 seats and can be expanded for more for non-sports events.

== Construction ==
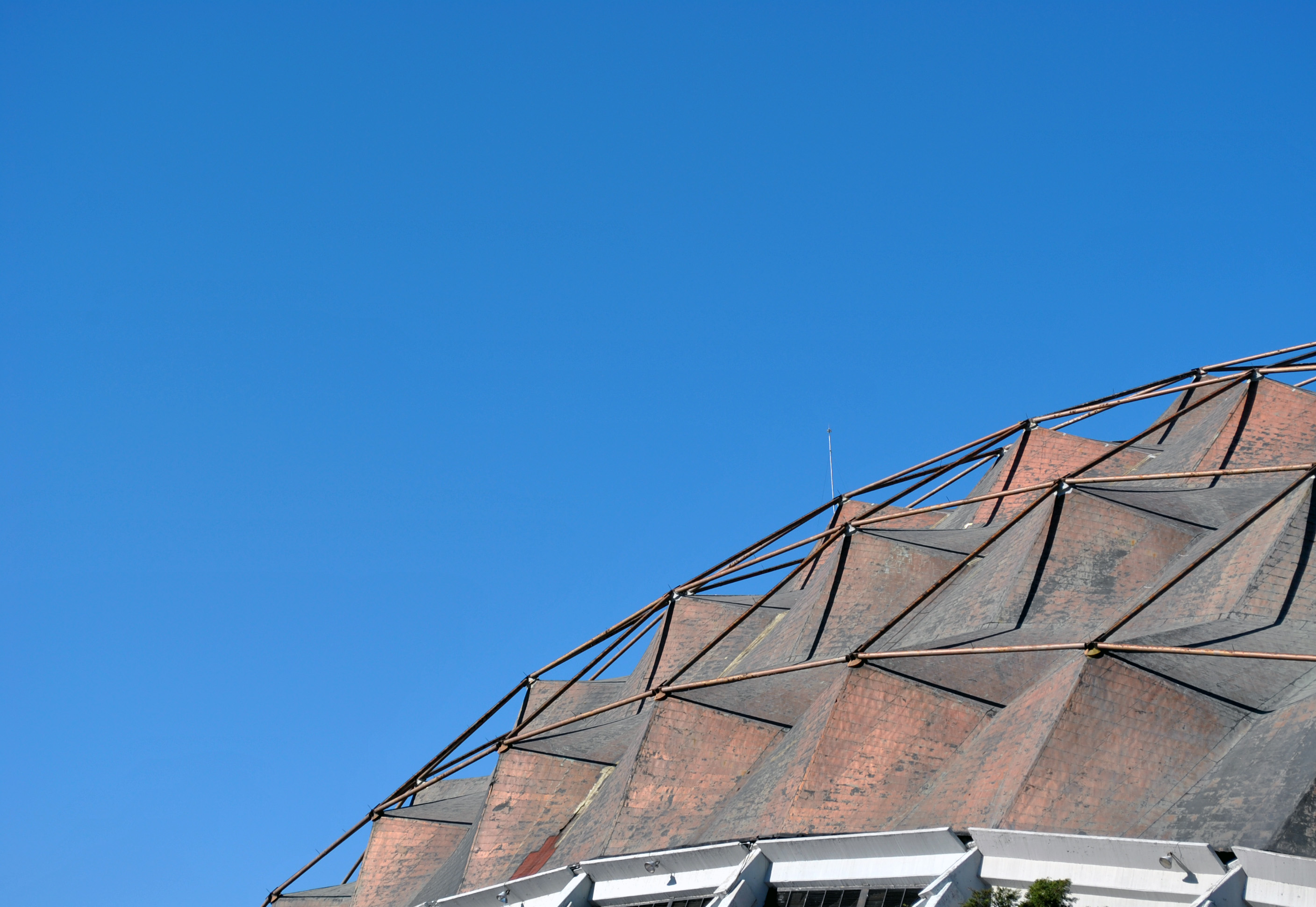
Detail of the structure of the palace.

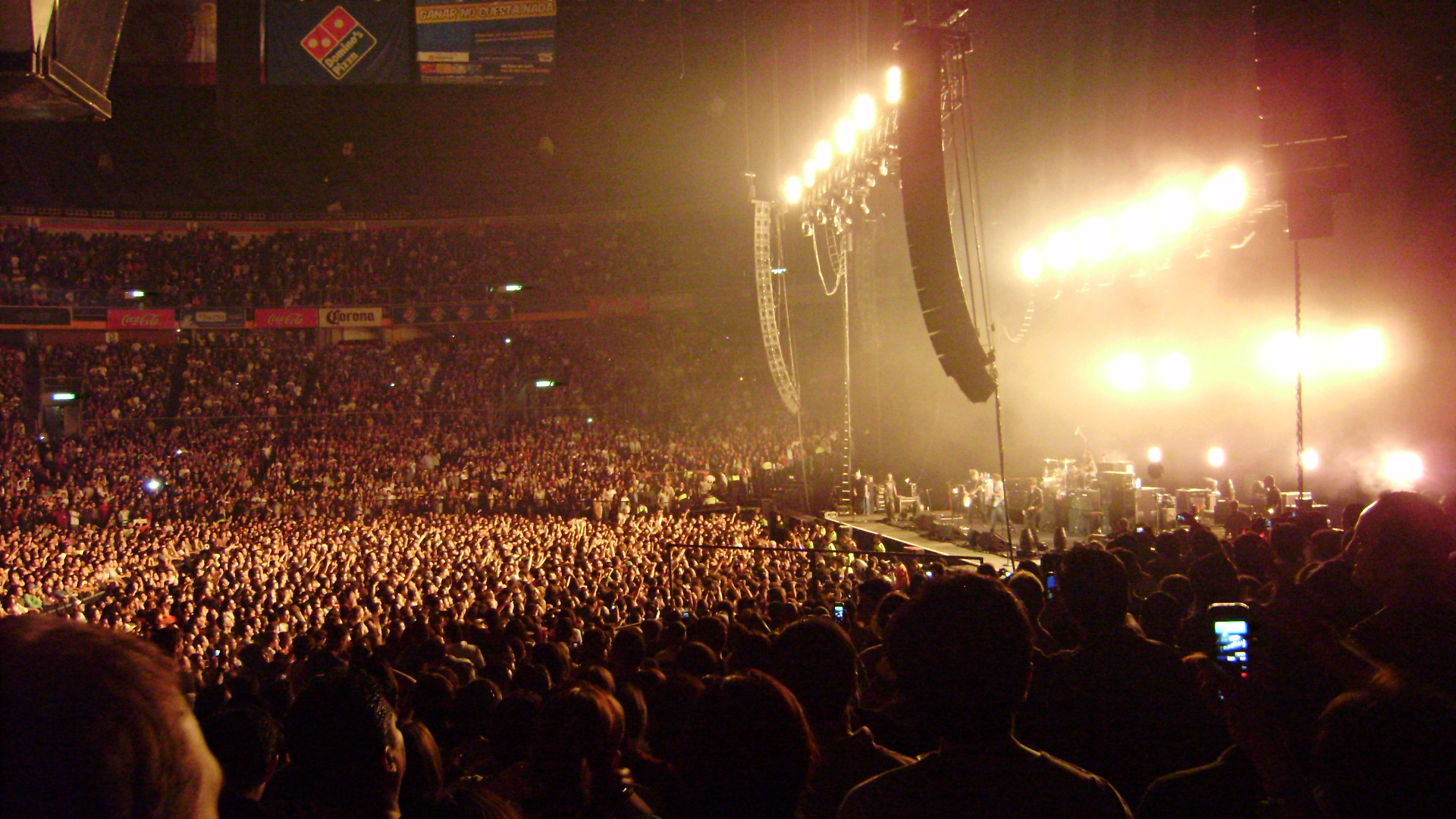
A Kings of Leon concert inside the arena

The Palacio de los Deportes was constructed specifically for the basketball tournament during the 1968 Summer Olympics. However, the Palacio was designed to be a multipurpose arena. There is also a smaller pavilion on complex for expositions and concerts.

The Palacio was constructed 14 miles (23 km) from the Olympic Village and 6.5 from downtown Mexico City in the Magdalena Mixhuca Sports City near the conflux of two expressways (Miguel Alemán Viaduct and Río Churubusco Interior Loop). It was built by the company ICA between October 15, 1966, and September 13, 1968, and finished construction one month before the Olympics. The Palacio is circular in design with a square-patterned dome spanning 380 feet (120 m) and enclosing an area of 6.7 acres (27,000 m^{2}). The dome consists of hyperbolic paraboloids of tubular aluminum covered with waterproof copper-sheathed plywood and supported by huge steel arches. The Palacio originally seated 22,370, including 7,370 in removable seats. There was also a parking space for 3,864 vehicles. The structure was designed by architects Félix Candela, Enrique Castañeda Tamborel and Antonio Peyri. It has three floors, which house complete facilities for athletes, judges, officials, organizers, as well as services for radio, television and the press. A mezzanine provides access to the boxes and middle and upper stands.

The structure underwent a series of modifications during the 1990s to adjust the acoustic profile of the structure. Earlier, the facility had acquired the derisive nickname of "Palacio de los rebotes" (Palace of Reverberations) due to the way sound bounced around and echoed in it, a major problem for music concerts scheduled at the arena, and a drawback even for sports events. Various adjustments were made to compensate for these acoustic problems.

== Events ==
The venue opened on October 8, 1968, with a performance by Maurice Béjart's Ballet of the 20th Century.

=== Sports ===
The Palacio hosted the basketball tournament during the 1968 Summer Olympics; it was also the main venue of the volleyball tournament. It was the home of the CBA Mexico City Aztecas (basketball) in 1994 and 1995, and the Mexico Toros of the CISL (indoor soccer) in 1995. On December 6, 1997, it hosted the NBA's regular season game between the Houston Rockets and the Dallas Mavericks, which ended with a 108–106 score.

Both the FIBA 1989 Tournament of the Americas and the 2015 FIBA Americas Championship were held at the Palacio.

=== Concerts ===
A common use of the Palace is to host big expositions and rock or pop concerts. There have been more than 400 concerts held here throughout the years; a curated list of some of the most important ones is below.

Performer	Date	Tour
INXS	January 12–14, 1991	The "X" Tour
Bob Dylan	March 1–2, 1991	Never Ending Tour
Soda Stereo	March 10–13, 1991	Gira Animal
Billy Joel	March 19–20, 23–24, 1991	Storm Front Tour
Santana	June 25–26, 1991	A 25–Year Celebration Tour
ZZ Top	September 27, 1991	Recycler Tour
Guns N' Roses	April 1–2, 1992	Use Your Illusion Tour
Van Halen	May 23–24, 1992	For Unlawful Carnal Knowledge Tour
Iron Maiden	October 1–2, 1992	Fear of the Dark Tour
Black Sabbath	November 8, 1992	Dehumanizer Tour
U2	November 21–25, 1992	Zoo TV Tour
Metallica	February 25 – March 2, 1993	Nowhere Else to Roam
Guns N' Roses	April 23–24, 1993	Use Your Illusion Tour
Def Leppard	September 29, 1993	Adrenalize Tour
Bon Jovi	July 13–14 and October 29, 1993	I'll Sleep When I'm Dead Tour
Depeche Mode	December 2–3, 1993	Devotional Tour
Aerosmith	January 25–26, 1994	Get a Grip Tour
Soda Stereo	February 26, 1995	Gira Sueño Stereo
Scorpions	March 23–34, 1994	Face the Heat Tour
Phil Collins	May 17, 18, 20 and 21, 1994	Both Sides of the World Tour
Mötley Crüe	June 15, 1994	Anywhere There's Electricity Tour
Ozzy Osbourne	August 28, 1995	Retirement Sucks Tour
Bon Jovi	October 22, 1995	These Days Tour
Soda Stereo	November 12, 1996	Gira MTV Comfort y musica para volar
Kiss with Pantera	March 7, 8, and 9, 1997	Worldwide Reunion Tour
Soda Stereo	August 30–31, 1997	Gira El ultimo concierto
Marilyn Manson	September 16, 1997	Dead to the World Tour
Oasis	March 24–25, 1998	Be Here Now Tour
Rage Against the Machine	October 28, 1999	The Battle of Los Angeles Tour
Megadeth & Mötley Crüe	July 15, 2000	Maximum Rock Tour
Rammstein	August 4–5, 2001	Mutter Tour
Paul McCartney	November 2, 3, 5, 2002	Driving World Tour
Pearl Jam	July 17–19, 2003	Riot Act Tour
ZZ Top	November 14, 2003	Beer Drinkers and Hell Raisers Tour
Cher	October 8–10, 2004	Living Proof: The Farewell Tour
RBD	May 27, 28 and 29, 2005; June 17, 18 and 19, 2005	Tour Generación RBD
Nine Inch Nails	June 2, 2005	Live: With Teeth Tour
Avril Lavigne	September 13, 2005	Bonez Tour
Pearl Jam	December 9–10, 2005	Pearl Jam 2005 North American and Latin American Tour
t.A.T.u.	July 14, 2006	Dangerous and Moving Tour
Shakira	October 1–11, 2006	Oral Fixation Tour
Muse	April 12, 2007	Black Holes and Revelations Tour
Gwen Stefani	July 15, 2007	The Sweet Escape Tour
My Chemical Romance	October 7, 2007	The Black Parade World Tour
Avril Lavigne	October 23, 2007	The Best Damn Thing Promo Tour
Daft Punk	October 31, 2007	Alive 2006/2007
Hilary Duff	January 18, 2008	Dignity Tour
Kanye West	October 17, 2008	Glow in the Dark Tour
Celine Dion	December 9, 2008	Taking Chances World Tour
Rihanna	January 24, 2009	Good Girl Gone Bad Tour
Wisin & Yandel	March 31, 2009	Los Extraterrestres World Tour
Wisin & Yandel	August 8-9, 2009	La Revolución World Tour
Daddy Yankee	November 12, 2009	Talento de Barrio Tour
Scorpions	September 7, 2010	Get Your Sting and Blackout World Tour
Kiss	September 30, 2010	The Hottest Show on Earth Tour
Arcade Fire	October 10, 2010	The Suburbs World Tour
Tokio Hotel	December 2, 2010	Humanoid City World Tour
Rammstein	December 6–7, 2010	Liebe ist für alle da Tour
Roger Waters	December 18, 19 and 21, 2010	The Wall Live (concert tour)
Kylie Minogue	May 12, 2011	Aphrodite: Les Folies Tour
Ricky Martin	May 14–15, 2011	Música + Alma + Sexo World Tour
Rammstein	May 26–27, 2011	Liebe ist für alle da Tour
Katy Perry	September 3, 2011	California Dreams Tour
Judas Priest	September 30, 2011	Epitaph World Tour
Los Autenticos Decadentes	November 11, 2011	Hecho en Mexico 25 anos
Selena Gomez	January 26, 2012	We Own the Night Tour
Evanescence	January 30, 2012	Evanescence Tour
Arctic Monkeys	March 28, 2012	Suck It and See Tour
Cirque du Soleil	August 24–29, 2012	Michael Jackson: The Immortal World Tour
Metallica	July 28 – August 9, 2012	El Arsenal Completo Tour 2012
Big Time Rush	September 25, 2012	Big Time Summer Tour
Wisin & Yandel	October 19, 2012	Los Lideres World Tour
Slash ft. Myles Kennedy, The Conspirators	November 27, 2012	Apocalyptic Love World Tour
Bruce Springsteen & The E Street Band	December 10, 2012	Wrecking Ball World Tour
Red Hot Chili Peppers	March 5–6, 2013	I'm With You World Tour
Soundgarden	May 31, 2013	King Animal Tour
Paramore	July 15, 2013	The Self-Titled Tour
Big Time Rush	August 14, 2013	Summer Break Tour
Beyoncé	September 26, 2013	The Mrs. Carter Show World Tour
Muse	October 18, 19, 20 and 22; 2013	The 2nd Law World Tour
OneRepublic	July 26, 2014	Native Summer Tour
Katy Perry	October 17–18, 2014	The Prismatic World Tour
Judas Priest	May 8, 2015	Redeemer of Souls Tour
Blur	October 15, 2015	The Magic Whip Tour
Ariana Grande	October 18, 2015	The Honeymoon Tour
Muse	November 17,18 & 20; 2015	Drones World Tour
Madonna	January 6–7, 2016	Rebel Heart Tour
Iron Maiden	March 3–4, 2016	The Book of Souls World Tour
Tame Impala	September 8, 2016	Currents Tour
Twenty One Pilots	September 30, 2016	Emotional Roadshow World Tour
Radiohead	October 3–4, 2016	2016 World Tour
The Who	October 12, 2016	Back to the Who Tour 51!
Demi Lovato	October 16, 2016	Future Now Tour
Adele	November 14–15, 2016	Adele Live 2016
Ha*Ash	November 26, 2016	Primera Fila: Hecho Realidad Tour
Guns N' Roses	November 29–30, 2016	Not in This Lifetime... Tour
Ed Sheeran	June 10, 2017	÷ Tour
Ariana Grande	July 12–13, 2017	Dangerous Woman Tour
Blondie and Garbage	August 14, 2017	Rage and Rapture Tour
Red Hot Chili Peppers	October 10–11, 2017	The Getaway World Tour
Paramore	October 23, 2017	Tour Two
Phil Collins	March 9–10, 2018	Not Dead Yet Tour
Harry Styles	June 1–2, 2018	Harry Styles: Live on Tour
Sam Smith	July 27, 2018	The Thrill of It All Tour
The Weeknd	October 22–23, 2018	Starboy: Legend of the Fall Tour
Gorillaz	October 24, 2018	The Now Now Tour
Twenty One Pilots	May 3, 2019	The Bandito Tour
Florence + The Machine	June 15, 2019	High As Hope Tour
Got7	July 13, 2019	"Keep Spinning" 2019 World Tour
Twice	July 19, 2019	Twicelights World Tour
Iron Maiden	September 27, 29 - 30, 2019	Legacy of the Beast World Tour
Jonas Brothers	October 30–31, 2019	Happiness Begins Tour
Shawn Mendes	December 19–21, 2019	Shawn Mendes: The Tour
Christina Aguilera	December 7, 2019	The X Tour
Seventeen	January 17, 2020	Ode to You World Tour
Mon Laferte	January 18, 2020	La Gira de Norma
Backstreet Boys	February 20 - 22, 2020	DNA World Tour
Creedence Clearwater Revisited	February 27, 2020	Por Última Vez en México
Foreigner	February 28, 2020	
Ghost	March 3, 2020	A Final Gig Named Death
Roger Waters	October 14–15, 2022	This Is Not a Drill
Imagine Dragons	November 1–2 & 4, 2022	Mercury World Tour
NCT 127	January 28, 2023	Neo City – The Link
The Killers	April 1, 2023	Imploding the Mirage World Tour
aespa	September 8, 2023	Synk: Hyper Line
Madonna	April 20, 21, 23, 24 & 26, 2024	The Celebration Tour
Danny Ocean	June 7, 2024	REFLEXA Tour Mexico 2024
IVE	June 23, 2024	Show What I Have
Yuridia	June 28-29, 2024	Pa' Luego es tarde Tour 2024
NCT DREAM	September 9, 2024	The Dream Show 3: Dream( )scape
Niall Horan	September 20-21, 2024	The Show: Live on Tour
AURORA	November 2, 2024	What Happened to the Earth?
aespa	February 4, 2025	2024-25 aespa LIVE TOUR - SYNK: PARALLEL LINE
Justin Timberlake	February 7-8, 2025	The Forget Tomorrow World Tour
J-Hope	March 22-23, 2025	Hope on the Stage Tour
Zayn Malik	March 25-27, 2025	Stairway to the Sky Tour
Kylie Minogue	August 22, 2025	Tension Tour
Rauw Alejandro	November 4, 5, 6, 8 & 9, 2025	Cosa Nuestra World Tour
Doja Cat	February 18, 2026	Tour Ma Vie World Tour
Kali Uchis	February 25, 2026	The Sincerely, Tour
Christina Aguilera	March 17, 2026	
Tyler, the Creator	March 24-25, 2026	Chromakopia: The World Tour
Lorde	May 1, 2026	Ultrasound World Tour
Rush	June 18 & 20, 2026	Fifty Something Tour
Rosalía	August 22, 24, 26, 28 & 29, 2026	Lux Tour
Laufey (singer)	September 12, 2026	A Matter of Time Tour
Robbie Williams	October 7 & 8, 2026	Britpop Tour

Preceded by Ginásio do Ibirapuera; São Paulo	FIBA Intercontinental Cup; Final Venue; 1974	Succeeded by Palasport Pianella; Cucciago, Cantù
