= College Hockey in the D =

College Hockey in the D, formerly College Hockey at the Joe, is a series of college ice hockey events sponsored by the Detroit Red Wings of the National Hockey League and hosted at Little Caesars Arena in Detroit, Michigan. The marquee event is the Great Lakes Invitational, held around New Year's Day.

The series was renamed in 2017 when the Red Wings moved from Joe Louis Arena following the end of the 2016–17 season. The Joe previously hosted the Final Four of the Central Collegiate Hockey Association conference tournament from 1982 until 2013, when the CCHA dissolved. The Joe also hosted the Final Four of the 2015 and 2017 Big Ten Men's Ice Hockey Tournament.

Other events include an annual game between Michigan State University and the University of Michigan, a tradition that is still practiced in the new Big Ten Hockey Conference. In some seasons from the CCHA days, another annual game featured Lake Superior State University versus either Michigan or Michigan State in alternating years, but this tradition has apparently been discontinued.
