= Joe Louis Arena =

Former arena in Detroit, Michigan, US

- The Joe

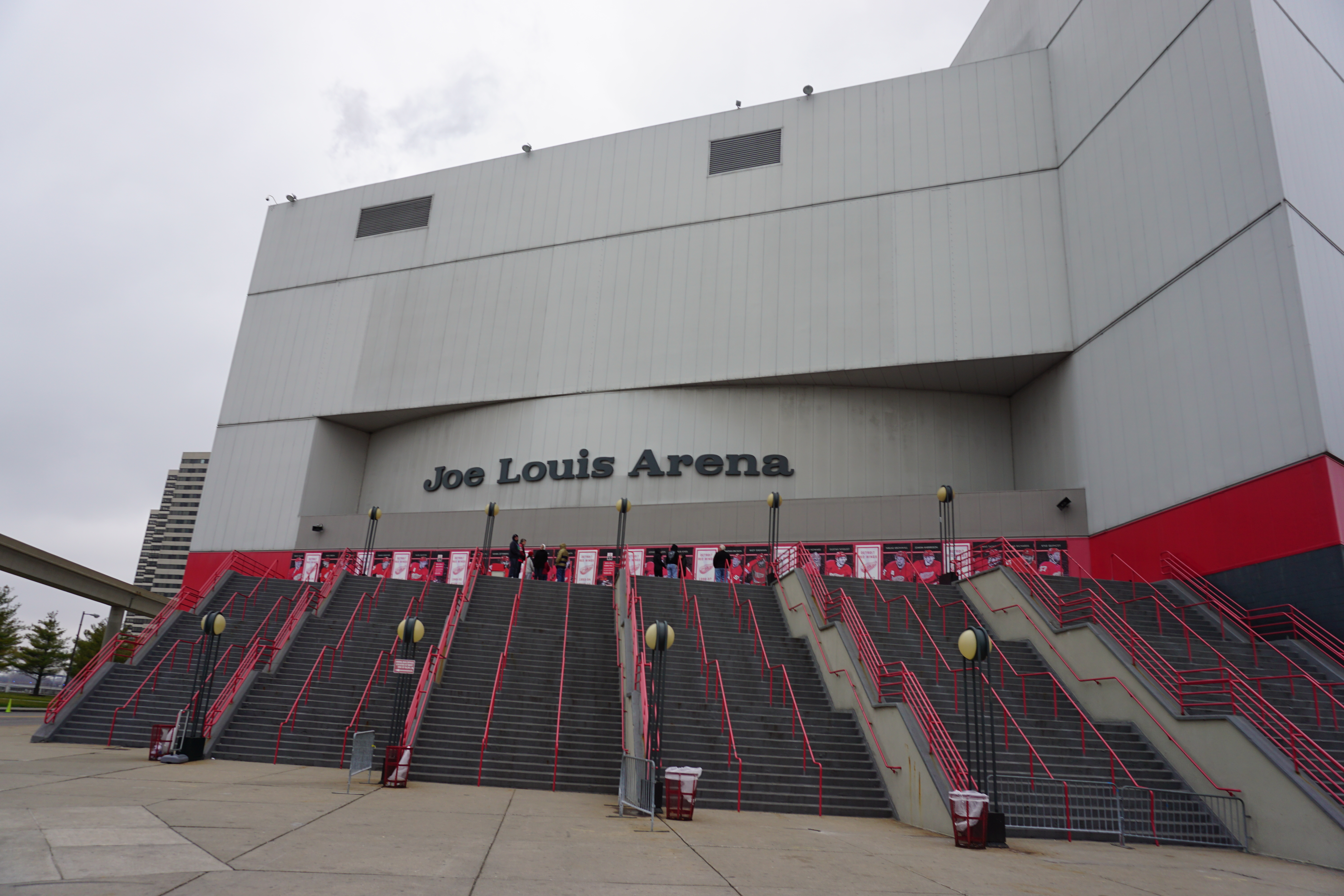
- Entrance of Joe Louis Arena in December 2015
- Interactive map of Joe Louis Arena
- Address: 19 Steve Yzerman Drive
- Location: Detroit, Michigan
- Coordinates: 42°19′31″N 83°3′5″W
- Owner: City of Detroit
- Operator: Olympia Entertainment
- Capacity: Ice hockey: 19,275 (1979–1989); 19,875 (1989–1996); 19,983 (1996–2000); 19,995 (2000–2001); 20,058 (2001–2003); 20,066 (2003–2014); 20,027 (2014–2017); Basketball: 20,153; Concerts: 21,666

Construction
- Groundbreaking: May 16, 1977
- Opened: December 12, 1979
- Closed: July 29, 2017
- Demolished: 2019–2020
- Cost: US$57 million ($253 million in 2025 dollars)
- Architect: Smith, Hinchman & Grylls
- General contractor: Barton Malow

Tenants
- Detroit Red Wings (NHL) (1979–2017); Detroit Pistons (NBA) (1985); Detroit Drive (AFL) (1988–1993); Detroit Turbos (MILL) (1989–1994); Detroit Compuware Ambassadors (OHL) (1991–92); Detroit Junior Red Wings (OHL) (1992–1995); Detroit Rockers (NPSL) (1996–2000)

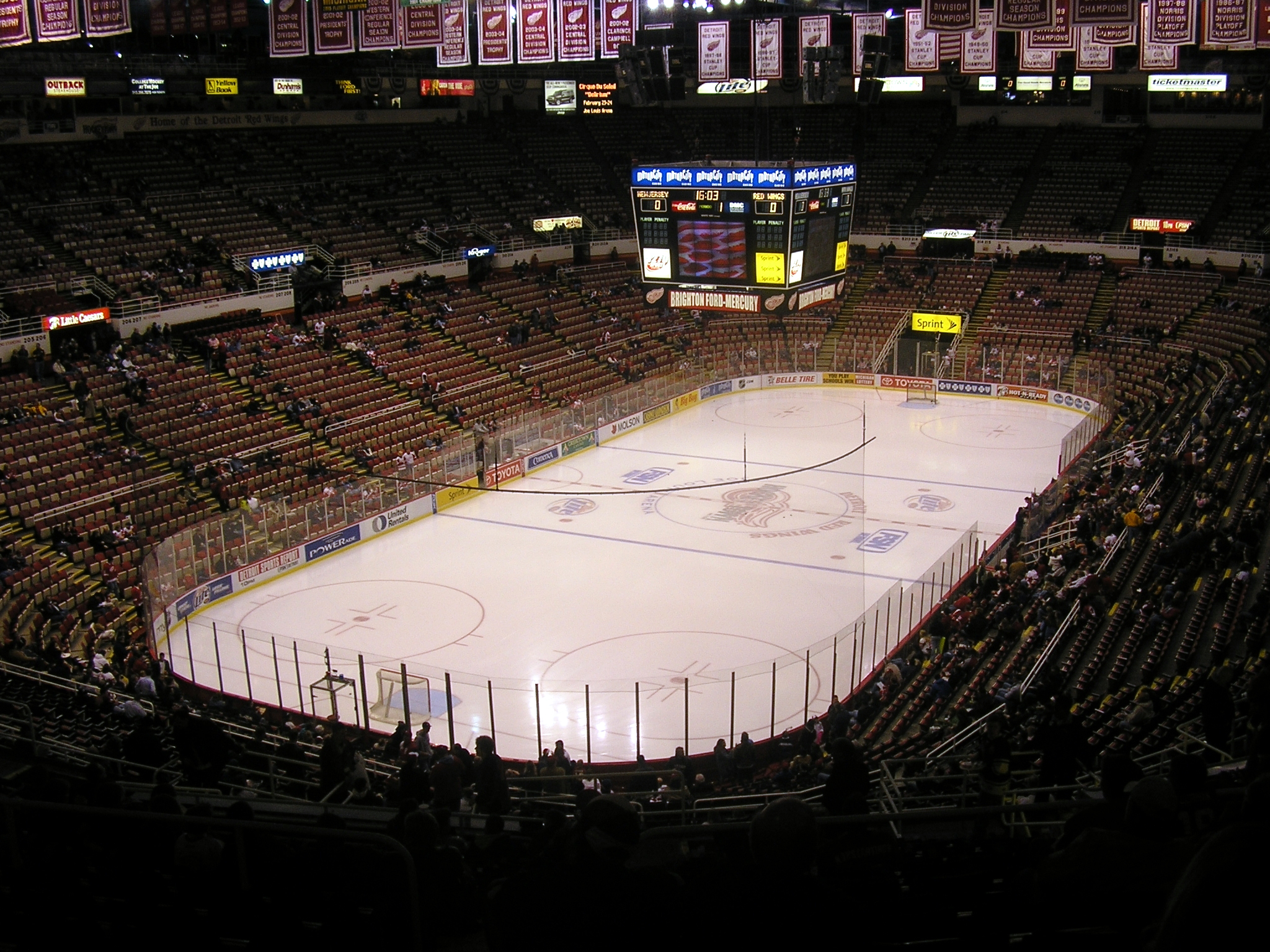
Inside Joe Louis Arena in December 2005.

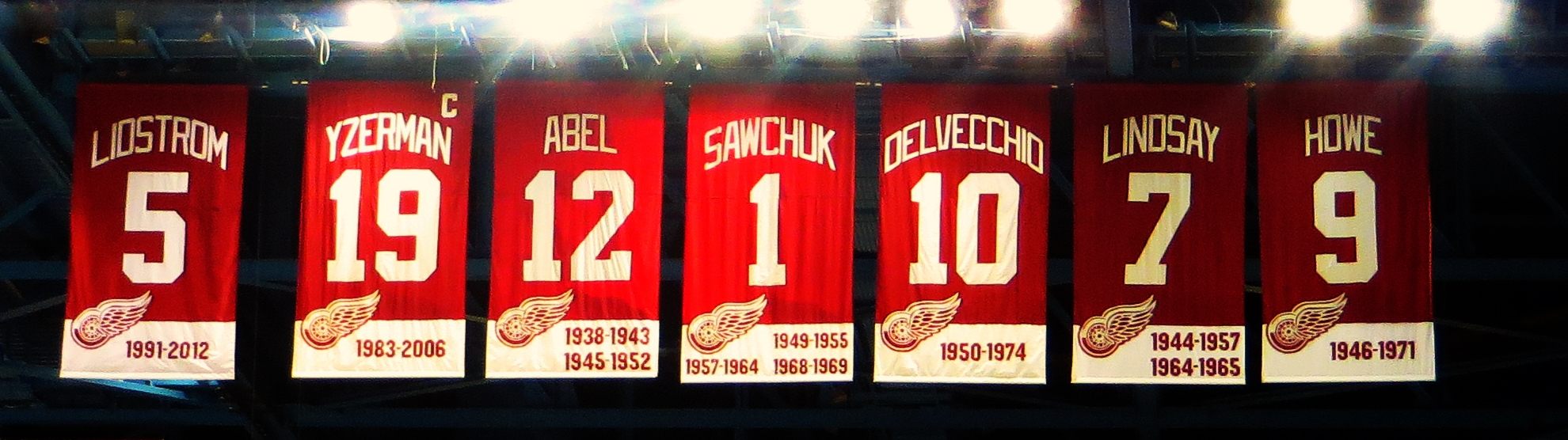
The retired numbers of former Detroit Red Wings players displayed at Joe Louis Arena.

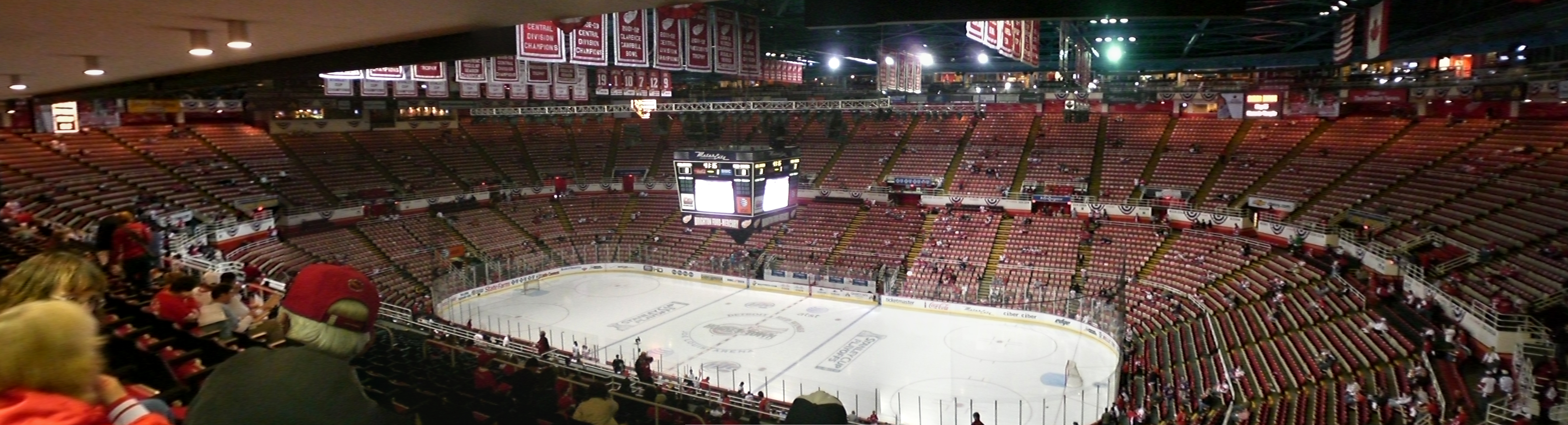
Panorama of Joe Louis Arena in April 2008.

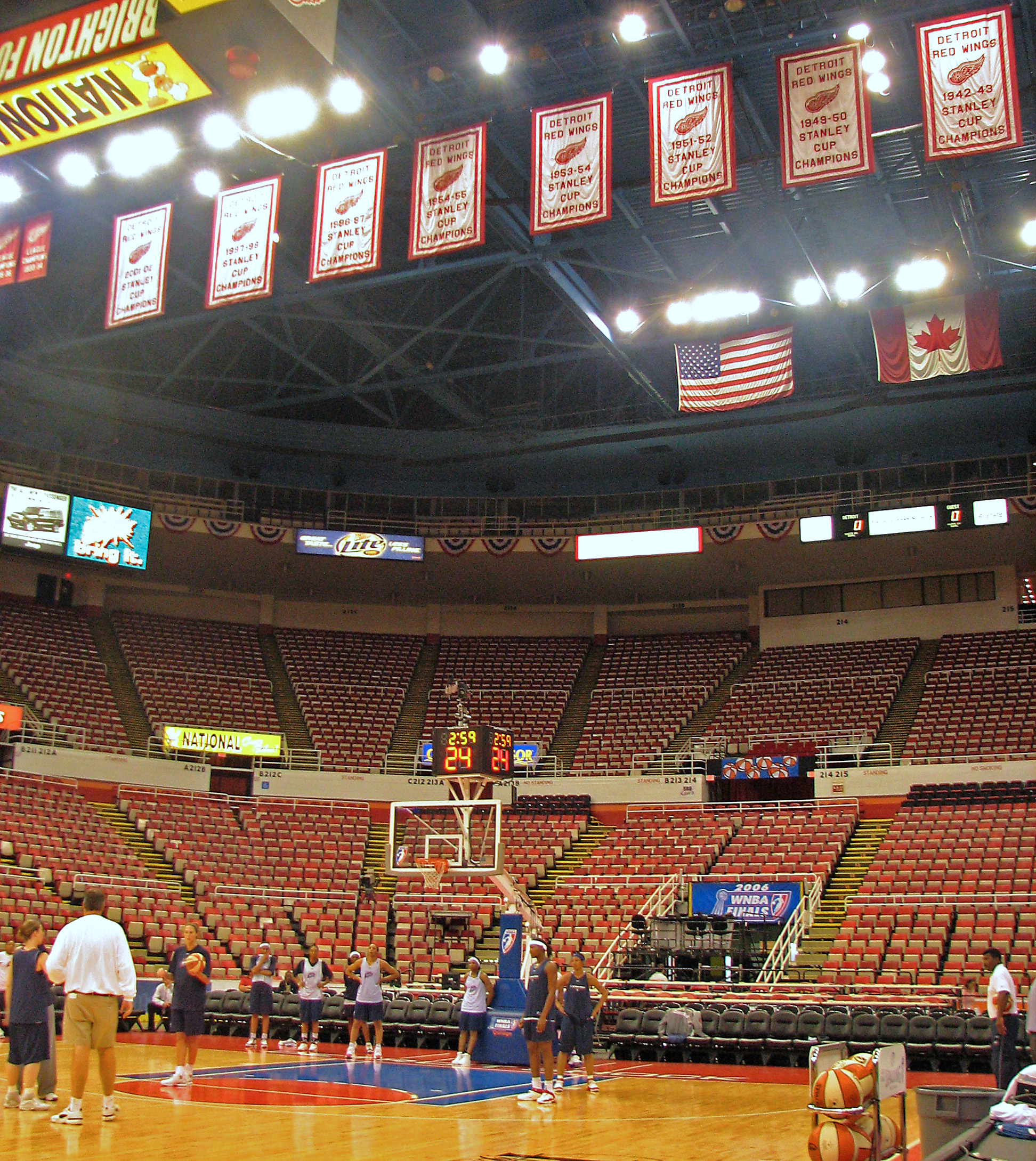
The Detroit Shock practice at Joe Louis Arena before Game 5 of the 2006 WNBA Finals.

Joe Louis Arena was a multi-purpose indoor arena located in Downtown Detroit. Completed in 1979 at a cost of US$57 million as a replacement for Olympia Stadium, it sat adjacent to Cobo Center on the bank of the Detroit River and was accessible by the Joe Louis Arena station on the Detroit People Mover. The venue was named after former heavyweight champion boxer Joe Louis, who grew up in Detroit.

It was the home of the Detroit Red Wings of the National Hockey League and the second oldest NHL venue after Madison Square Garden until the start of the 2017–18 NHL season. Joe Louis Arena was owned by the city of Detroit, and operated by Olympia Entertainment, a subsidiary of team owner Ilitch Holdings.

In April 2017, the Red Wings hosted their final game at Joe Louis Arena; the venue was succeeded by Little Caesars Arena. "The Joe" closed in July 2017. Demolition started in early 2019 and was completed by mid-2020. A 25-story residential tower called the Residences at Water Square opened at the site in February 2024.

== History ==
The Red Wings had been playing at Olympia Stadium since 1927. However, by the late 1970s, the neighborhood around the Olympia had gradually deteriorated, especially after the 1967 Detroit riot. In 1977, the Red Wings announced that they would be moving to a proposed arena in suburban Pontiac. However, the city of Detroit countered with a proposal for a new riverfront arena in which they would charge the Red Wings much lower rent than what Pontiac was offering. The package also gave the team operational control of the arena, nearby Cobo Arena and parking lots. The Red Wings ultimately decided to stay in Detroit proper.

The arena hosted its first event on December 12, 1979: a college basketball game between the University of Michigan and the University of Detroit. The Red Wings played their first game at Joe Louis Arena on December 27, 1979, hosting the St. Louis Blues. The game ended in a 3–2 loss for the Red Wings. The Red Wings' first win at the arena came on December 30, 1979, where they defeated the New York Islanders 4–2. Later that season, it hosted the 32nd NHL All-Star Game on February 5, 1980, which was played before a then-NHL record crowd of 21,002. Joe Louis Arena was the site of the 1987 NHL entry draft, which marked the first NHL Entry Draft to be held in the United States. In 1980, the arena hosted the Republican National Convention that nominated Ronald Reagan as the Republican candidate for President of the United States.

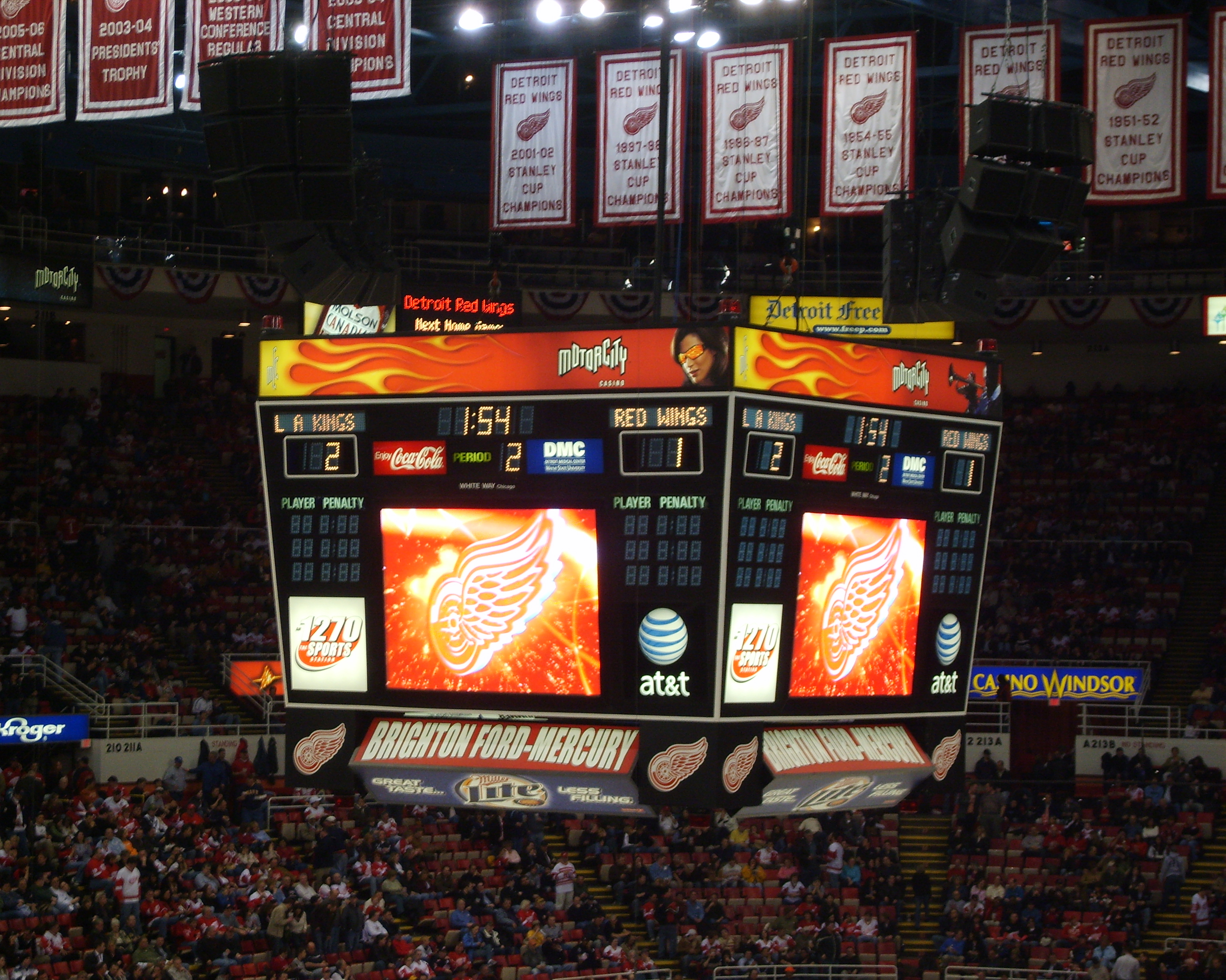
The electronic scoreboard at Joe Louis Arena, during a game between the Detroit Red Wings and the Los Angeles Kings on March 9, 2007

In 1990, color matrix boards were installed on the scoreboard; these were replaced by four Sony JumboTron video walls three years later, when the matrix boards were placed in the corners of the fascia. In 2006, LED video screens replaced the JumboTrons. The screens debuted November 22, 2006, when the Red Wings played the Vancouver Canucks. That same day, the arena's West Entrance was named the "Gordie Howe Entrance" in honor of the legendary Red Wing player, and a bronze statue of Howe was placed inside the entrance. Joe Louis Arena housed 86 premium suites. In 2008, the arena introduced the Comerica Bank Legend's Club, a 181-person private seating location in the arena's southeast corner.

=== Replacement and demolition ===
On July 20, 2014, following the July 2013 approval of a $650 million project to build a new sports and entertainment district in Downtown Detroit, Christopher Ilitch unveiled designs for a new arena near Comerica Park and Ford Field which was completed in 2017 and succeeded Joe Louis Arena as the home of the Red Wings. On October 16, 2014, lawyers involved in the ongoing Detroit bankruptcy case disclosed in court that after demolition, which will be paid for by the city and state, the land on which the arena stands, along with an adjacent parking lot, will be transferred to the Financial Guaranty Insurance Company (FGIC), a bond insurer with a $1 billion claim against the city.

The Red Wings' final game at Joe Louis Arena was played on April 9, 2017, against the New Jersey Devils. The final game at the arena also served as then Red Wings' captain Henrik Zetterberg's 1,000th game. The Red Wings won 4–1, the final goal in the arena's history coming from Red Wings forward Riley Sheahan. It was the second of two he scored, which were also the only goals he scored at all during the 2016–17 season. On the same day, the family of Bob Probert, a former Red Wing who died in 2010, spread his ashes inside the Red Wings penalty box. The last ticketed event held was a WWE Live event, held on July 29, 2017. Demolition of the interior of the arena started in early 2019, while demolition on the exterior commenced in June 2019. Due to the arena's proximity to Cobo Center, now Huntington Place, it was dismantled traditionally rather than imploded.

The arena's property is being redeveloped as Water Square, a development that includes a 25-story high-rise apartment building completed in 2024, and a 600-room JW Marriott hotel expected to be completed in January 2027. Second Avenue is also being extended south to connect it from Congress Street to Steve Yzerman Drive, improving vehicular and pedestrian access to the riverfront. The new hotel will also be connected via skyway to a new expansion of Huntington Place.

== Other tenants and events ==
In 1995, the Detroit Junior Red Wings won the Ontario Hockey League's J. Ross Robertson Cup, defeating the Guelph Storm.

Joe Louis Arena hosted college hockey events as part of College Hockey at The Joe, the Great Lakes Invitational, and the Big Ten Conference hockey tournament in 2015 and 2017.

The Detroit Pistons used the arena for Game 5 of their 1984 playoff series against the New York Knicks when the Pontiac Silverdome was unavailable due to a scheduling conflict. In the game, Pistons star Isiah Thomas scored 16 points in the final 1:34 of regulation to send the game into overtime before the Pistons lost. The Pistons were forced to return to Joe Louis Arena for 15 games during the 1984–85 season, after the roof of the Silverdome collapsed during a snowstorm.

The Red Wings hosted the Stanley Cup Final at the arena six times (1995, 1997, 1998, 2002, 2008, and 2009). Two of their four Stanley Cup championships were clinched at Joe Louis Arena in 1997 and 2002. The Pittsburgh Penguins were the only visiting team to win the Stanley Cup at the Joe, taking home the trophy in 2009. It was also the only Game 7 of the Cup Finals played at the arena.

Joe Louis Arena was the site of the decisive Game 5 of the 2006 WNBA Finals between the Sacramento Monarchs and Detroit Shock on September 9, due to The Palace of Auburn Hills, the Shock's usual home arena, being used for a Mariah Carey concert on the same day. The Shock won the game 80–75 to clinch the championship.

Former Arena Football League team the Detroit Drive also had success during their time at the arena, playing in six consecutive ArenaBowls from 1988 to 1993 and winning four of them. Four of the games (ArenaBowl III, ArenaBowl IV, ArenaBowl V and ArenaBowl VII) were played at Joe Louis Arena.

WWE hosted numerous shows at the arena, including the Survivor Series pay-per-view in 1991, 1999 and 2005.

Joe Louis Arena hosted the 1994 U.S. Figure Skating Championships, best known for the pre-competition attack on Nancy Kerrigan by associates of Tonya Harding. In addition, Joe Louis Arena was the site of the 2013 edition of the Skate America figure skating competition.

On May 7, 2015, it was announced that the Horizon League men's basketball tournament would be held in Detroit beginning in 2016 under a five-year deal; the 2016 and 2017 tournaments were held at Joe Louis Arena.

On December 4, 2016, Joe Louis Arena hosted its final OHL game as the Windsor Spitfires defeated the Saginaw Spirit 3–2.

On February 10, 2017, Joe Louis Arena hosted its final regular season college hockey game as the Michigan Wolverines defeated the Michigan State Spartans 5–4 in a shootout.

Joe Louis Arena was also a concert venue. Until the Palace opened in 1988, Joe Louis Arena was Michigan's largest indoor arena for concerts. The first concert to take place there occurred on February 17, 1980, in which Max Webster opened for the Canadian rock group Rush. This venue was used for the Alice Cooper concert film The Nightmare Returns in 1986. The last concert at the venue was Summer Jamz 20! on July 23, 2017.

Entertainment events held at Joe Louis Arena
Date	Nationalities	Artists	Events	Supporting Acts	Attendance	Box Office
1980
February 17	Canada	Rush	Permanent Waves Tour	Max Webster		
February 19	Canada	Rush	Permanent Waves Tour	Max Webster		
May 23	United Kingdom/United States	Fleetwood Mac	Tusk Tour	Christopher Cross		
May 24	United Kingdom/United States	Fleetwood Mac	Tusk Tour	Christopher Cross		
August 25	United States	Billy Joel	Glass Houses Tour			
September 6	United Kingdom	Elton John	1980 World Tour			
September 19	United Kingdom	Yes	Drama Tour			
September 20	United Kingdom	Queen	The Game Tour			
September 26	United States	Paul Simon	One Trick Pony Tour			
October 5	United Kingdom	Black Sabbath	Heaven & Hell Tour			
1981
August 11	United States	Bruce Springsteen	The River Tour			
August 12	United States	Bruce Springsteen	The River Tour			
August 21	United States	The Jacksons	Triumph Tour	Stacy Lattisaw		
November 6	United States/United Kingdom	Foreigner	4	Billy Squier		
December 4	United States	Prince	Controversy Tour			
1982
May 15	United States	Journey	Escape Tour			
May 16	United States	Journey	Escape Tour			
September 19	United Kingdom/United States	Fleetwood Mac	Mirage Tour			
1983
April 8	United States	Prince	1999 Tour			
June 12	United States	Marvin Gaye	Sexual Healing Tour			
July 28	United Kingdom	The Police	Synchronicity Tour			
July 29	United Kingdom	The Police	Synchronicity Tour			
July 30	United Kingdom	David Bowie	Serious Moonlight Tour			
July 31	United Kingdom	David Bowie	Serious Moonlight Tour			
1984
March 6	United Kingdom	Ozzy Osbourne	Bark at the Moon Tour			
April 4	United States	Billy Joel	An Innocent Man Tour			
July 30	United States	Bruce Springsteen	Born in the U.S.A. Tour		39,430 / 39,430	
July 31	United States	Bruce Springsteen	Born in the U.S.A. Tour		39,430 / 39,430	
November 4	United States	Prince	Purple Rain Tour		129,730 / 129,730	$1,967,572
November 5	United States	Prince	Purple Rain Tour		129,730 / 129,730	$1,967,572
November 7	United States	Prince	Purple Rain Tour		129,730 / 129,730	$1,967,572
November 8	United States	Prince	Purple Rain Tour		129,730 / 129,730	$1,967,572
November 9	United States	Prince	Purple Rain Tour		129,730 / 129,730	$1,967,572
November 11	United States	Prince	Purple Rain Tour		129,730 / 129,730	$1,967,572
November 12	United States	Prince	Purple Rain Tour		129,730 / 129,730	$1,967,572
1985
January 4	United Kingdom	Iron Maiden	World Slavery Tour			
January 12	United States	Aerosmith	Back In The Saddle Tour			
February 19	United Kingdom	Deep Purple	Perfect Strangers Tour			
March 11	United Kingdom	Deep Purple	Perfect Strangers Tour			
March 19	United Kingdom	Roger Waters	The Pros and Cons of Hitch Hiking			
April 19	United States/United Kingdom	Foreigner	Agent Provocateur	Giuffria		
August 28	United States	Tina Turner	Private Dancer Tour			
September 15	United States	Mötley Crüe	Theatre of Pain Tour			
September 28	United States	Ratt	World Infestation Tour			
1986
April 4	United States	Metallica	Damage, Inc. Tour			
May 9	United States	Van Halen	5150 Tour			
May 10	United States	Van Halen	5150 Tour			
May 11	United States	Van Halen	5150 Tour			
May 22	United States	Aerosmith	Done with Mirrors Tour			
August 8	United States	Run DMC	Raising Hell Tour	Beastie Boys, LL Cool J, Timex Social Club		
September 18	United Kingdom	Genesis	Invisible Touch Tour			
September 19	United Kingdom	Genesis	Invisible Touch Tour			
September 20	United Kingdom	Genesis	Invisible Touch Tour			
October 8	United States	Journey	Raised on Radio Tour			
October 9	United States	Journey	Raised on Radio Tour			
1987
February 13	United States	Megadeth	Wake Up Dead Tour			
March 18	United Kingdom	Iron Maiden	Somewhere on Tour	Waysted		
May 26	United States	Bon Jovi	Slippery When Wet Tour			
May 27	United States	Bon Jovi	Slippery When Wet Tour			
May 28	United States	Bon Jovi	Slippery When Wet Tour			
July 8	United States	Boston	Third Stage Tour		38,610 / 38,610	$675,675
July 9	United States	Boston	Third Stage Tour		38,610 / 38,610	$675,675
July 10	United States	Boston	Third Stage Tour		38,610 / 38,610	$675,675
July 11	United States	Boston	Third Stage Tour		38,610 / 38,610	$675,675
July 19	United States	Mötley Crüe	Girls, Girls, Girls Tour	Whitesnake		
July 20	United States	Mötley Crüe	Girls, Girls, Girls Tour	Whitesnake		
October 3	United States	Lynyrd Skynyrd	Lynyrd Skynyrd Tribute Tour			
October 17	United Kingdom/United States	Fleetwood Mac	Shake the Cage Tour			
December 5	United States	Aerosmith	Permanent Vacation Tour		19,409 / 19,409	$339,658
1988
March 25	United States	Frank Sinatra	Together Again Tour	Dean Martin, Sammy Davis Jr.	18,500 / 18,500	$658,000
March 28	United States	Bruce Springsteen	Tunnel of Love Express Tour		39,550 / 39,550	$889,875
March 29	United States	Bruce Springsteen	Tunnel of Love Express Tour		39,550 / 39,550	$889,875
April 11	United States	Grateful Dead	Spring 88' tour			
July 2	United Kingdom	Iron Maiden	Seventh Tour of a Seventh Tour	Frehley's Comet		
July 31	United States	Run DMC	Run's House Tour	Public Enemy, DJ Jazzy Jeff & The Fresh Prince		
October 17	United States	New Edition	Heartbreak Tour	Bobby Brown, Al B. Sure!		
October 30	United States	Prince	Lovesexy Tour			
October 31	United States	Prince	Lovesexy Tour			
November 2	United States	Anita Baker	Giving You the Best World Tour			
December 18	United Kingdom	Ozzy Osbourne	No Rest for the Wicked Tour			
1989
March 21	United States	Bon Jovi	New Jersey Syndicate Tour		17,877 / 19,868	$357,540
May 28	United States	Bon Jovi	New Jersey Syndicate Tour		17,877 / 19,868	$357,540
August 6	United States	LL Cool J	Nitro World Tour	Eazy E, N.W.A, Slick Rick, De La Soul		
1990
April 2	United States	Janet Jackson	Rhythm Nation World Tour 1990		35,645 / 35,645	$702,460
April 3	United States	Janet Jackson	Rhythm Nation World Tour 1990		35,645 / 35,645	$702,460
April 7	Germany	Milli Vanilli	Girl You Know Tour			
July 13	United States	The B-52s	Cosmic Tour			
July 15	United States	Public Enemy	Tour Of A Black Planet			
August 18	United States	MC Hammer	Please Hammer Don't Hurt 'Em World Tour	After 7 / Oaktown's 357 / Michel´le / Troop		
November 15	United States	New Kids on the Block	The Magic Summer Tour			
November 16	United States	New Kids on the Block	The Magic Summer Tour			
November 17	United States	New Kids on the Block	The Magic Summer Tour			
November 18	United States	New Kids on the Block	The Magic Summer Tour			
1991
April 9	United States	New Kids on the Block	The Magic Summer Tour			
June 1	United States	Queensrÿche	Building Empires Tour	Suicidal Tendencies		
July 3	United States	Whitney Houston	I'm Your Baby Tonight World Tour			
August 26	United States	Vanilla Ice	To the Extreme World Tour			
1992
May 29	United States	MC Hammer	Too Legit to Quit World Tour	Jodeci, TLC, Oaktown 357, Mary J. Blige		
May 30	United States	MC Hammer	Too Legit to Quit World Tour	Jodeci, TLC, Oaktown 357, Mary J. Blige		
1993
December 4	United States	Janet Jackson	Janet World Tour			
1997
February 20	United States	New Edition	Home Again			
May 13	United States	Pat Benatar	Innamorata			
1998
July 17	United States	Janet Jackson	The Velvet Rope Tour			
July 18	United States	Janet Jackson	The Velvet Rope Tour			
October 24	United States	Prince	New Power Soul Tour			
December 20	Various	The Night 89X Stole Christmas 1		Beck Everlast Garbage Kid Rock Marcy Playground Placebo		
1999
July 2	United States	Brandy	Never Say Never World Tour			
July 9	United States/United Kingdom	Bad Company / David Lee Roth	The Original Bad Company / David Lee Roth			
2000
July 6	United States	Dr. Dre, Snoop Dogg, Ice Cube, Eminem	Up in Smoke Tour	Various		
December 7	United States	Limp Bizkit, DMX, Godsmack, Sinisstar	Anger Management Tour			
2001
May 12	Australia	AC/DC	Stiff Upper Lip World Tour	Wide Mouth Mason		
June 23	United States	Prince	A Celebration			
October 13	United Kingdom	Elton John	Songs from the West Coast Tour			
2002
September 17	United States	Ted Nugent	Craveman	REO Speedwagon		
September 19	United States	Ted Nugent	Craveman	REO Speedwagon, Meat Loaf, Kid Rock		
September 20	United States	Kid Rock	Cocky Tour	Lynyrd Skynyrd		
2003
May 17	United States	Cher	Living Proof: The Farewell Tour			
June 12	United States/United Kingdom	Journey, REO Speedwagon, Styx	Classic Rock's Main Event			
November 22	United States	Earth, Wind & Fire	Crown Royal Comedy Soul Festival	The Isley Brothers		
2004
March 11	United States	Kelly Clarkson	The Independent Tour	Clay Aiken		
July 10	United States	Van Halen	Best of Both Worlds	Silvertide		
July 30	United States	Prince	Musicology Live 2004ever			
August 21	United States	Kenny Chesney	Guitars, Tiki Bars and a Whole Lotta Love Tour	Rascal Flatts		
September 23	United States	REO Speedwagon	2004 tour			
September 24	United States	REO Speedwagon	2004 tour			
2005
April 23	United States	Snoop Dogg	How the West Was Won Tour	The Game		
August 4	Various	American Idols Live! Tour 2005				
August 5	United States	REO Speedwagon	2005 tour			
August 6	United States	REO Speedwagon	2005 tour			
August 27	United States	Kenny Chesney	Somewhere in the Sun Tour	Gretchen Wilson		
September 29	United States	System of a Down	Mezmerize/Hypnotize	Hella, The Mars Volta		
October 7	United States	Foo Fighters	In Your Honor	Weezer, Kaiser Chiefs		
October 8	United States	Queens of the Stone Age	Lullabies to Paralyze Tour	Autolux, Nine Inch Nails		
December 3	United States	Dave Matthews Band	2005 Fall Tour	Soulive		
December 23	United States	Various	We Ain’t Done Yet Holladay Jam Tour	Ciara, Chris Brown, Bow Wow		
2006
February 3	United States	Kid Rock	Live Trucker Tour	Bob Seger and the Silver Bullet Band, Ty Stone		
February 4	United States	Kid Rock	Live Trucker Tour	Bob Seger and the Silver Bullet Band, Ty Stone		
2010
January 12	United States	Lady Gaga	The Monster Ball Tour	Jason Derulo, Semi Precious Weapons	16,084	$750,090
January 13	United States	Lady Gaga	The Monster Ball Tour	Jason Derulo, Semi Precious Weapons	16,648	$750,090
2014
May 17	United States	Lady Gaga	ArtRave: The Artpop Ball	Lady Starlight Hatsune Miku	11,971 / 11,971	$954,173

== In popular culture ==
The arena is featured in the movie Straight Outta Compton in a scene depicting N.W.A's performance of their controversial song "Fuck tha Police".

Events and tenants
Preceded by Detroit Olympia	Home of the Detroit Red Wings; 1979–2017	Succeeded by Little Caesars Arena
Preceded by Buffalo Memorial Auditorium	Host of the NHL All-Star Game; 1980	Succeeded by The Forum
Preceded by Olympic Center	Host of the Frozen Four; 1985	Succeeded by Providence Civic Center
Preceded by Providence Civic Center	Host of the Frozen Four; 1987	Succeeded by Olympic Center
Preceded by Saint Paul Civic Center	Host of the Frozen Four; 1990	Succeeded by Saint Paul Civic Center
Preceded by Madison Square Garden	Home of the Royal Rumble; 2009	Succeeded by Philips Arena
