= Great Lakes Invitational =

Collegiate ice hockey tournament

- Sport: College ice hockey
- Founded: 1965
- Founder: John MacInnes, Jack Paterson, Jack Tompkins
- No. of teams: 4
- Venues: Van Andel Arena (2022–Present); Yost Ice Arena/Munn Ice Arena (2021); Little Caesars Arena (2018–2019); Joe Louis Arena (1979–2012, 2014–2016); Comerica Park (2013); Olympia Stadium (1965–1978)
- Most recent champion: Michigan State
- Most titles: Michigan (17)
- Broadcaster: Fox Sports Detroit

The Great Lakes Invitational (GLI) is a four-team National Collegiate Athletic Association (NCAA) men's ice hockey tournament held annually at Van Andel Arena in Grand Rapids, Michigan, around the New Year's holiday. It was previously held in Detroit as part of College Hockey in the D.

The tournament was born out of a conversation between the general manager of Olympia Stadium, Lincoln Cavalieri, Michigan Tech's long-time coach, John MacInnes, and Detroit Red Wings scout Jack Paterson. The three men were discussing the lack of American-born players in the National Hockey League (NHL) and concluded that a prestigious collegiate tournament could make a difference by promoting interest in hockey among young athletes, as well as the general public. Jack Tompkins, American Airlines vice president, former University of Michigan goalie, and a member of the Detroit Red Wings organization, championed their vision as well, and together in 1965, they founded the Great Lakes Invitational hockey tournament.

The GLI has grown into one of the premier college and holiday sporting events in the country, originating at Detroit's Olympia Stadium. Michigan Tech, the host for the tournament since its inception, added Michigan as a co-host in 1976. The tournament moved into Joe Louis Arena when the Red Wings' new home arena opened in December 1979. In 2017, with the closure of the Joe, the GLI relocated to the new Little Caesars Arena until the 2020–21 season.

Michigan State is traditionally selected as a third participant while the fourth is a different team each season. Northern Michigan was scheduled to be the 2020-21 invitee, but the tournament was cancelled.

The 2013 edition of the invitational was held outdoors at Comerica Park, as part of festivities for the 2014 NHL Winter Classic at Michigan Stadium. Western Michigan defeated Michigan Tech 1–0 in overtime. The outdoor games were originally scheduled for 2012. However, due to the NHL lockout, the Winter Classic and all associated festivities were postponed to 2013–14.

Due to the COVID-19 pandemic, the Great Lakes Invitational was not held in 2020, marking the first year the tournament has not been played since its inception. In 2021, instead of the usual "tournament" format, there was a "showcase" scheduled with four set games (UM-MTU, MSU-WMU, UM-WMU, and MSU-MTU). On December 27, 2021, Michigan cited player health concerns and backed out of the December 30 game against Western Michigan, COVID-19 was not cited as a reason. However, Michigan played their first scheduled game of the tournament vs. Michigan Tech on December 29.

On June 8, 2022, the tournament field for the 2022 tournament was announced. Ferris State, Michigan State, Michigan Tech, and Western Michigan competed at Van Andel Arena in Grand Rapids. This marks the first year Michigan has not played since 1973.

Future GLIs to be held in Grand Rapids include Michigan Tech and Michigan State each year as host schools. 2026 features Western Michigan and Lindenwood and 2027 features Ferris State and Penn State.

== Yearly results ==
Season	Champion	Runner-up	Third place	Fourth place	Jack Tompkins Trophy (MVP)
2025	Michigan State	Michigan Tech	Miami	Ferris State	Charlie Stramel, MSU
2024	Michigan State	Western Michigan	Michigan Tech	Northern Michigan	Luca Di Pasquo, MSU
2023	Michigan Tech	Michigan State	Alaska	Ferris State	Jack Works, MTU
2022	Western Michigan	Ferris State	Michigan Tech	Michigan State	Jason Polin, WMU
2021	Played as a showcase, no tournament standings.				
2020	Cancelled due to the COVID-19 pandemic				
2019	Michigan Tech	Michigan	Michigan State	Ferris State	Logan Pietila, MTU
2018	Lake Superior State	Michigan Tech	Michigan	Michigan State	Diego Cuglietta, LSSU
2017	Bowling Green	Michigan Tech	Michigan	Michigan State	Lukas Craggs, BGSU
2016	Western Michigan	Michigan Tech	Michigan	Michigan State	Colt Conrad, WMU
2015	Michigan	Michigan Tech	Northern Michigan	Michigan State	Kyle Connor, UM
2014	Michigan	Michigan State	Michigan Tech	Ferris State	Steve Racine, UM
2013	Western Michigan	Michigan Tech	Michigan State	Michigan	Lukas Hafner, WMU
2012	Michigan Tech	Western Michigan	Michigan	Michigan State	Pheonix Copley, MTU
2011	Michigan	Michigan State	Boston College	Michigan Tech	Kevin Clare, UM
2010	Michigan	Colorado College	Michigan State	Michigan Tech	Luke Glendening, UM
2009	Michigan State	Rensselaer	Michigan	Michigan Tech	Brett Perlini, MSU
2008	Michigan	Michigan State	Michigan Tech	North Dakota	Louie Caporusso, UM
2007	Michigan	Michigan Tech	Providence	Michigan State	Billy Sauer, UM
2006	Michigan State	Michigan	Harvard	Michigan Tech	Bryan Lerg, MSU
2005	Colorado College	Michigan State	Michigan	Michigan Tech	Joey Crabb, CC
2004	Michigan State	Michigan	New Hampshire	Michigan Tech	Jim Slater, MSU
2003	Boston College	Michigan State	Michigan	Michigan Tech	Joe Pearce, BC
2002	Boston University	Michigan	Michigan State	Michigan Tech	Sean Fields, BU
2001	North Dakota	Michigan State	Michigan	Michigan Tech	Tim Skarperud, UND
2000	Michigan State	Michigan Tech	Boston College	Michigan	Ryan Miller, MSU
1999	Michigan State	Michigan	Michigan Tech	Lake Superior State	Shawn Horcoff, MSU
1998	Michigan State	Michigan	Northern Michigan	Michigan Tech	Mike Gresl, MSU
1997	Michigan State	Michigan	Michigan Tech	St. Lawrence	Mike Weaver, MSU
1996	Michigan	Lake Superior State	Michigan State	Michigan Tech	Brendan Morrison, UM
1995	Michigan	Michigan State	Michigan Tech	Northern Michigan	Brendan Morrison, UM
1994	Michigan	Michigan State	Michigan Tech	Cornell	Brendan Morrison, UM
1993	Michigan	Michigan State	Michigan Tech	Notre Dame	David Oliver, UM
1992	Michigan	Northern Michigan	Michigan State	Michigan Tech	Cam Stewart, UM
1991	Michigan	Michigan Tech	Michigan State	Harvard	Steve Shields, UM
1990	Michigan	Maine	Michigan Tech	Michigan State	Steve Shields, UM
1989	Michigan	Michigan State	Michigan Tech	Northern Michigan	Scott Sharples, UM
1988	Michigan	North Dakota	Michigan State	Michigan Tech	Todd Brost, UM
1987	Wisconsin	Michigan State	Michigan	Michigan Tech	Dean Anderson, UW
1986	Western Michigan	Michigan	Michigan State	Michigan Tech	Bill Horn, WMU
1985	Michigan State	Rensselaer	Michigan	Michigan Tech	Don McSween, MSU
1984	Michigan State	Michigan Tech	Michigan	Bowling Green	Bob Essensa, MSU
1983	Michigan State	Michigan Tech	Northern Michigan	Michigan	Dan McFall, MSU
1982	Michigan State	Michigan Tech	Michigan	Notre Dame	Dale Krentz, MSU
1981	Notre Dame	Michigan Tech	Michigan	Michigan State	Dave Laurion, ND
1980	Michigan Tech	Michigan	Michigan State	Harvard	Paul Fricker, UM
1979	Michigan Tech	Michigan	Wisconsin	Michigan State	Murray Eaves, UM
1978	Michigan Tech	Ohio State	Boston University	Michigan	John Rockwell, MTU
1977	Michigan Tech	Michigan	Lake Superior State	Western Michigan	Dave Joelson, MTU
1976	Michigan Tech	Michigan	Brown	Bowling Green	Greg Hay, MTU
1975	Michigan	Michigan Tech	Boston University	Pennsylvania	Stu Ostlund, MTU
1974	Michigan Tech	Michigan	Harvard	Yale	Robbie Moore, UM
1973	Michigan State	Michigan Tech	Boston College	Pennsylvania	Tom Ross, MSU
1972	Harvard	Michigan Tech	Boston University	Michigan	Dave Hynes, Har
1971	Michigan Tech	Michigan State	Dartmouth	Notre Dame	Ian Williams, ND
1970	Michigan Tech	Michigan	Colgate	Brown	Mike Usitalo, MTU
1969	New Hampshire	Michigan State	Michigan Tech	Princeton	Larry Smith, UNH
1968	Michigan Tech	Wisconsin	Michigan State	Michigan	Bill Watt, MSU
1967	North Dakota	Michigan Tech	Michigan State	Western Ontario	Roger Bamburak, UND
1966	Michigan	Michigan State	Michigan Tech	Western Ontario	Mel Wakabayashi, UM
1965	Toronto	Michigan Tech	Boston University	Colorado College	Henry Monteith, UT

== Team records ==
Team	Titles	Runner-up	Third place	Fourth place	Years participated
Michigan	17	14	13	6	50
Michigan State	14	15	14	8	51
Michigan Tech	12	18	13	16	59
Western Michigan	4	2	0	1	7
North Dakota	2	1	0	1	4
Lake Superior State	1	1	1	1	4
Wisconsin	1	1	1	0	3
Colorado College	1	1	0	1	3
Boston University	1	0	4	0	5
Boston College	1	0	3	0	4
Harvard	1	0	2	2	5
New Hampshire	1	0	1	0	2
Notre Dame	1	0	0	3	4
Bowling Green	1	0	0	2	3
Toronto	1	0	0	0	1
Rensselaer	0	2	0	0	2
Northern Michigan	0	1	3	2	6
Ferris State	0	1	0	4	5
Maine	0	1	0	0	1
Ohio State	0	1	0	0	1
Brown	0	0	1	1	2
Alaska	0	0	1	0	1
Colgate	0	0	1	0	1
Dartmouth	0	0	1	0	1
Providence	0	0	1	0	1
Penn	0	0	0	2	2
Western Ontario	0	0	0	2	2
Miami	0	0	1	0	1
Cornell	0	0	0	1	1
Princeton	0	0	0	1	1
St. Lawrence	0	0	0	1	1
Yale	0	0	0	1	1

== Gallery ==
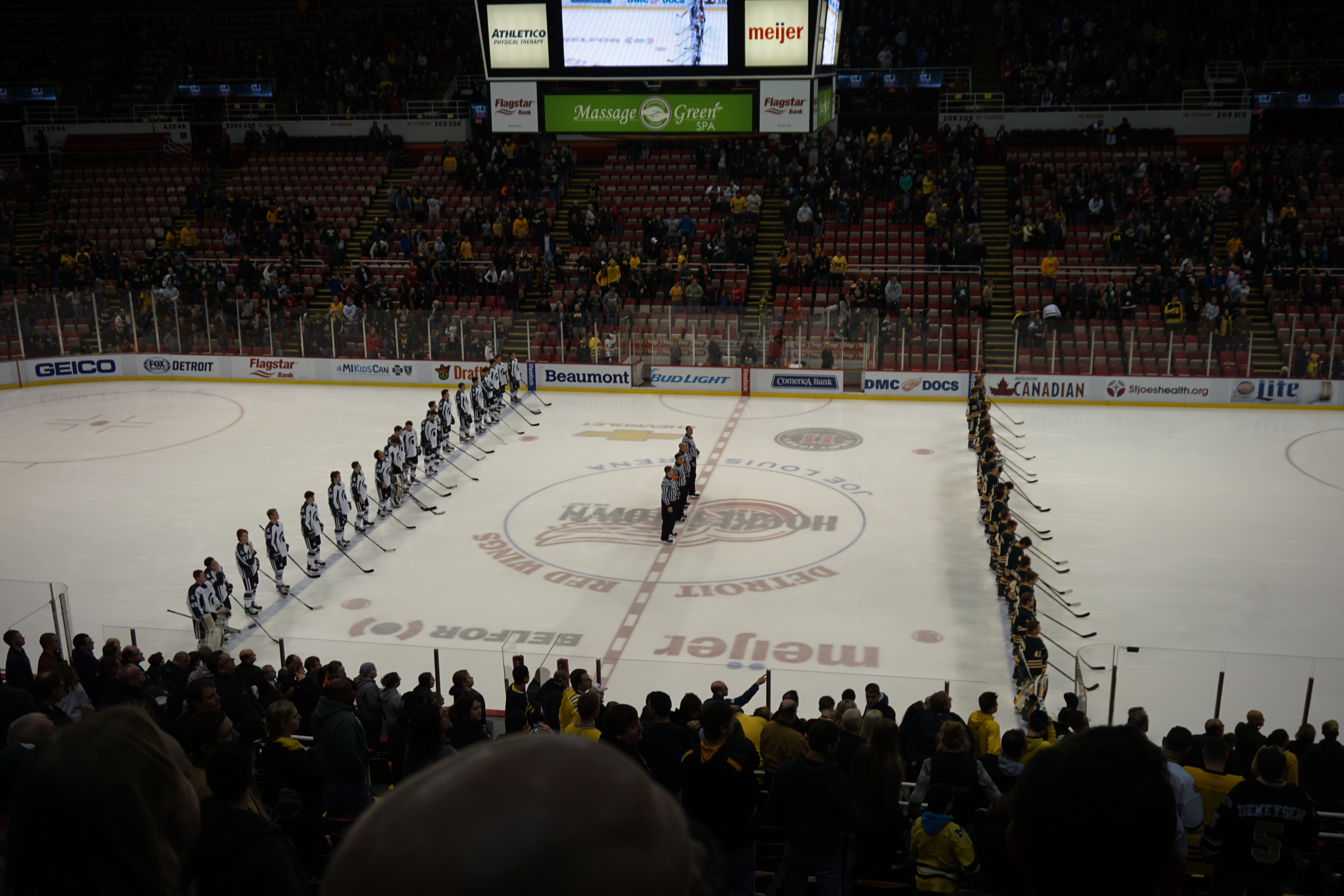
Michigan State and Northern Michigan before the 2015 consolation game

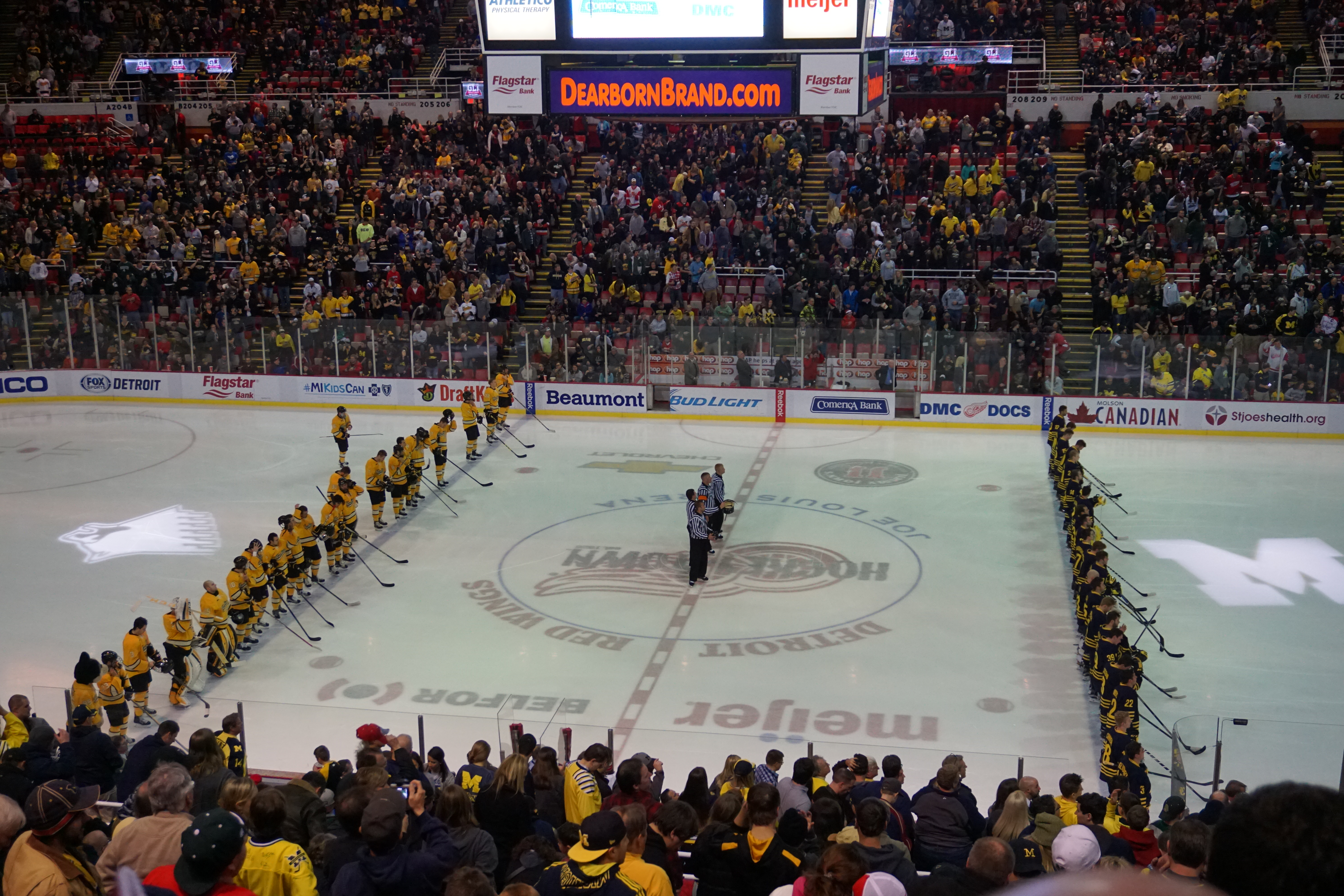
Michigan Tech and Michigan before the 2015 championship game

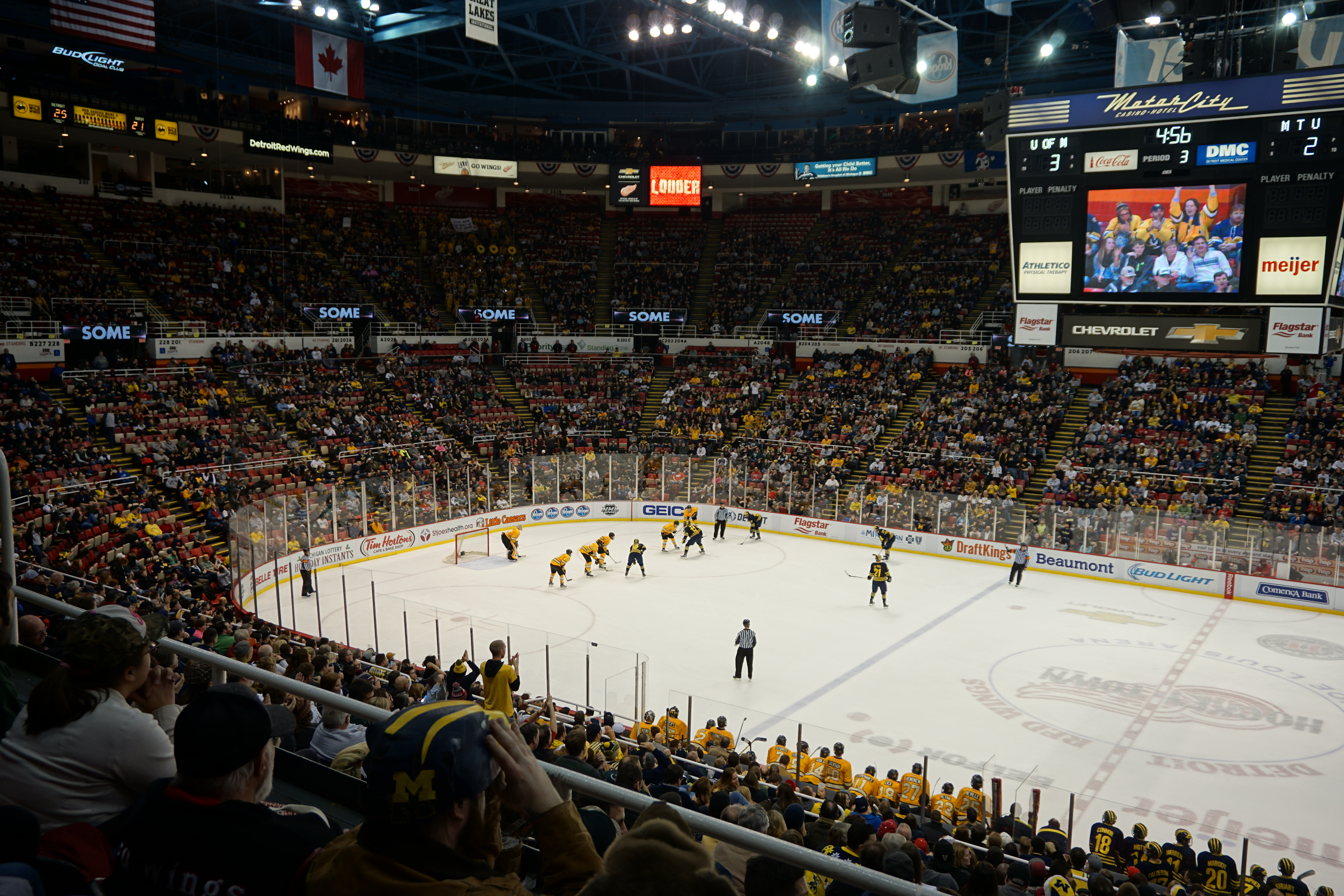
A face-off during the 2015 championship game

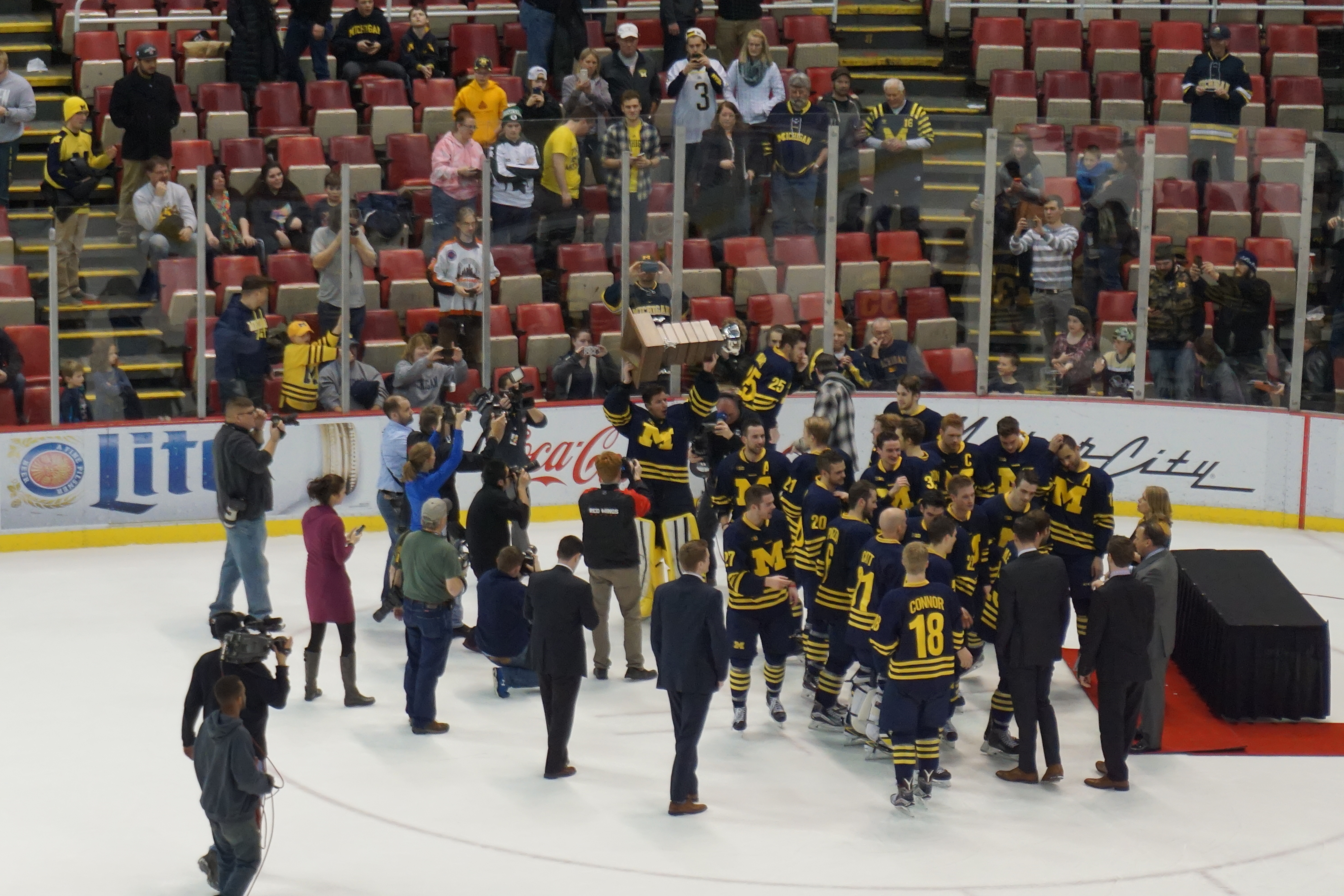
Michigan with the MacInnes Cup after winning the 2015 GLI

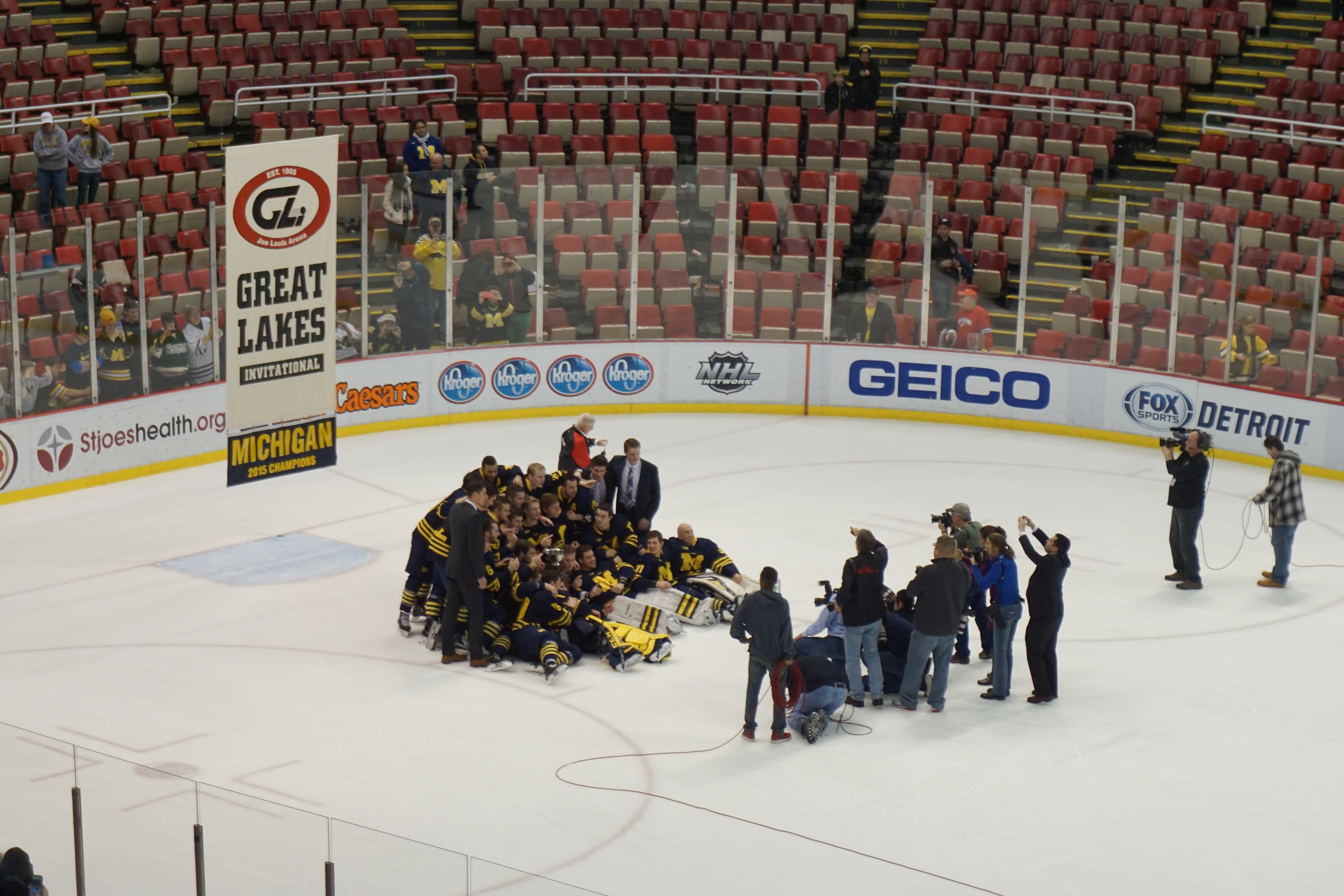
Michigan posing with the GLI banner after winning the 2015 tournament
