= Jack Tompkins =

American sports player (1909–1993)

Jack A. Tompkins (June 2, 1909 – October 11, 1993) was an American baseball and ice hockey player, airline executive and civic leader in Detroit, Michigan. As a high school student in Royal Oak, Michigan, he won 27 consecutive baseball games as a pitcher, still a Michigan high school record. At the University of Michigan, he was captain of the baseball and hockey teams in 1932. He worked for more than 30 years for American Airlines in Detroit and became a civic leader in the area, working to bring the Olympic Games to Detroit from the 1940s to the 1960s and founding the Great Lakes Invitational hockey tournament in 1965.

== Youth in Royal Oak, Michigan ==
Tompkins was raised in Royal Oak, Michigan and graduated from Royal Oak High School in 1928. In high school Tompkins earned 16 varsity letters. He pitched four no-hit no-run games and led the baseball team in hitting as it won 33 straight games and 2 state championships. He set a state high school record with 27 consecutive wins, still the record recognized by the Michigan High School Athletic Association. He was inducted into the Royal Oak High School Hall of Fame in 1997.

== University of Michigan ==
In the fall of 1928, Tompkins enrolled at the University of Michigan where he was a star athlete as a pitcher in baseball and a goaltender in ice hockey. He played every minute of every game during his three years on the Wolverines hockey team and was elected captain as a senior in the 1931–1932 season. Michigan won the Big Ten Conference hockey championship in Tompkins' sophomore and junior years, and Tompkins was an All-American in his senior year. He was also named to the All-American Collegiate Hockey team on three occasions. In baseball, Tompkins was a three-year player as a pitcher. He was named captain of the Michigan baseball team in 1932, making him the first Michigan athlete to be elected captain of two different varsity sports teams in the same year. He was inducted into the University of Michigan Athletic Hall of Honor in 1982.

== Professional career and community service ==
After graduating from Michigan, Tompkins played professional baseball for several years with a Detroit Tigers farm club and professional hockey in the International and National Leagues under contract with the Detroit Red Wings.

In 1935, Tompkins began a career with American Airlines, the company for which he continued to work for more than 30 years. He was the Detroit area manager for the airline. In 1945, Tompkins led the effort to have the Civil Aeronautics Board designate Detroit as one of six American cities to be terminals for flights to the major cities of Europe. Tompkins announced that American Airlines would provide service to Norway, Sweden, Helsinki, Leningrad, Moscow, Glasgow, London, Amsterdam, Copenhagen, Warsaw, Berlin and the Azores.

In 1946, Tompkins was appointed to the Detroit Olympic Committee, a local group working to bring the Summer Olympic Games to Detroit. During his 20 years on the committee, Tompkins participated in the International Olympic Committee's site selection process five times: 1952 (5th place), 1956 (4th place), 1960 (3rd place), 1964 (2nd place), 1968 (2nd place) and 1972 (4th place).

Tompkins also served numerous community organizations, including the boards of the Detroit Convention and Tourist Bureau, the Boy Scouts of America, the Boys' Committee of Detroit, Economic Club of Detroit, the Downtown Property Owners Association, the Washington Boulevard Association and Travelers' Aid Society. He was the chairman of Detroit's International Air Fairs in 1950, 1951, and 1952, a board member for the Michigan Aeronautics and Space Association, a trustee of the Michigan Aviation Foundation, and a member of the Aviation Advisory Committee of the Detroit Board of Commerce. In 1971, he was elected vice president of the University of Michigan graduate "M" Club.

In 1965, Tompkins co-founded the Great Lakes Invitational hockey tournament. At that time, only one American played a significant role on any NHL team. Seeking to improve the prospects for Americans to play in the NHL, a group led by Tompkins, Michigan Tech's legendary hockey coach John MacInnes, and Olympia Stadium manager Lincoln Cavalieri, and Detroit Red Wings's scout Jack Paterson decided to organize a prestigious hockey tournament to be played every year in Detroit. Since 1965, the tournament has been held every year in Detroit between Christmas and New Year's.

== Family ==
Tompkins married and had three children, a son and two daughters, all born in the 1950s. Tompkins lived with this family in Grosse Pointe, Michigan.

== See also ==
- University of Michigan Athletic Hall of Honor
