= Empire (Queensrÿche song) =

Single by Queensrÿche

from the album Empire
- Released: October 29, 1990
- Recorded: Spring 1990
- Genre: Heavy metal; progressive rock
- Length: 5:24
- Label: EMI USA
- Songwriters: Geoff Tate; Michael Wilton
- Producer: Peter Collins

Queensrÿche singles chronology
"Last Time in Paris" (1990)	"Empire" (1990)	"Best I Can" (1990)

Audio sample
- file; help

Music video
- "Empire" on YouTube

"Empire" is a song by the progressive metal band Queensrÿche, appearing on their 1990 album Empire. The lyrical content of the song warns of a foreboding and unstoppable "Empire" of drug trafficking within the United States and its related crimes, that will inevitably lead to the breakdown of civility in American society.

Known as a fan favorite, the group has played the song often live, doing so over a thousand times as of April 2016, and the track is the band's second most played song in its setlist history. It is exceeded only by "Eyes of a Stranger".

== Track listing ==
7" single

Side A
No.	Title	Length
1.	"Empire" (radio edit)	5:07

Side B
No.	Title	Length
1.	"Scarborough Fair"	3:53

12" single

Side A
No.	Title	Length
1.	"Empire" (radio edit)	5:07

Side B
No.	Title	Length
1.	"Scarborough Fair"	3:53
2.	"Prophecy"	3:58

CD single

No.	Title	Length
1.	"Empire" (radio edit)	5:12
2.	"Scarborough Fair"	3:50
3.	"Prophecy"	3:59
4.	"Della Brown"	7:03

== Chart performance ==
Chart (1990–91)	Peak position
Australia (ARIA Charts)	150
UK Singles	61
U.S. Billboard Mainstream Rock	22

== Personnel ==
- Geoff Tate – vocals
- Michael Wilton – lead guitar
- Chris DeGarmo – rhythm guitar
- Eddie Jackson – bass
- Scott Rockenfield – drums

== Additional personnel ==
- Randy Gane – message left on answering machine
