= Don Elias Mansur Ballpark =

Multi-use stadium in Oranjestad, Aruba

Coordinates: 12.5092°N 70.0222°W

Don Elias Mansur Ballpark is a multi-use stadium in Oranjestad, Aruba. It is currently used mostly for baseball games. The stadium has a capacity of 12,000 people.
