= Last Time in Paris =

Single by Queensrÿche

from the album The Adventures of Ford Fairlane Soundtrack
- Released: 1990
- Recorded: 1990
- Length: 3:59
- Label: EMI
- Songwriter(s): Chris DeGarmo; Geoff Tate
- Producer(s): Peter Collins

Queensrÿche singles chronology
"I Don't Believe in Love" (1989)	"Last Time in Paris" (1990)	"Empire" (1990)

Audio
- "Last Time in Paris" on YouTube

"Last Time in Paris" is a song by progressive metal band Queensrÿche, appearing in the 1990 action film The Adventures of Ford Fairlane. It was released as a radio single from the film's soundtrack album.

The song can also be found as a bonus track on remastered reissues of the band's 1990 album Empire, during which sessions it was originally recorded.

== Track listing ==
No.	Title	Length
1.	"Last Time in Paris"	3:59

== Chart performance ==
Chart	Peak position
U.S. Mainstream Rock	27
