= Lawlor Events Center =

Multipurpose indoor arena in Nevada, U.S.

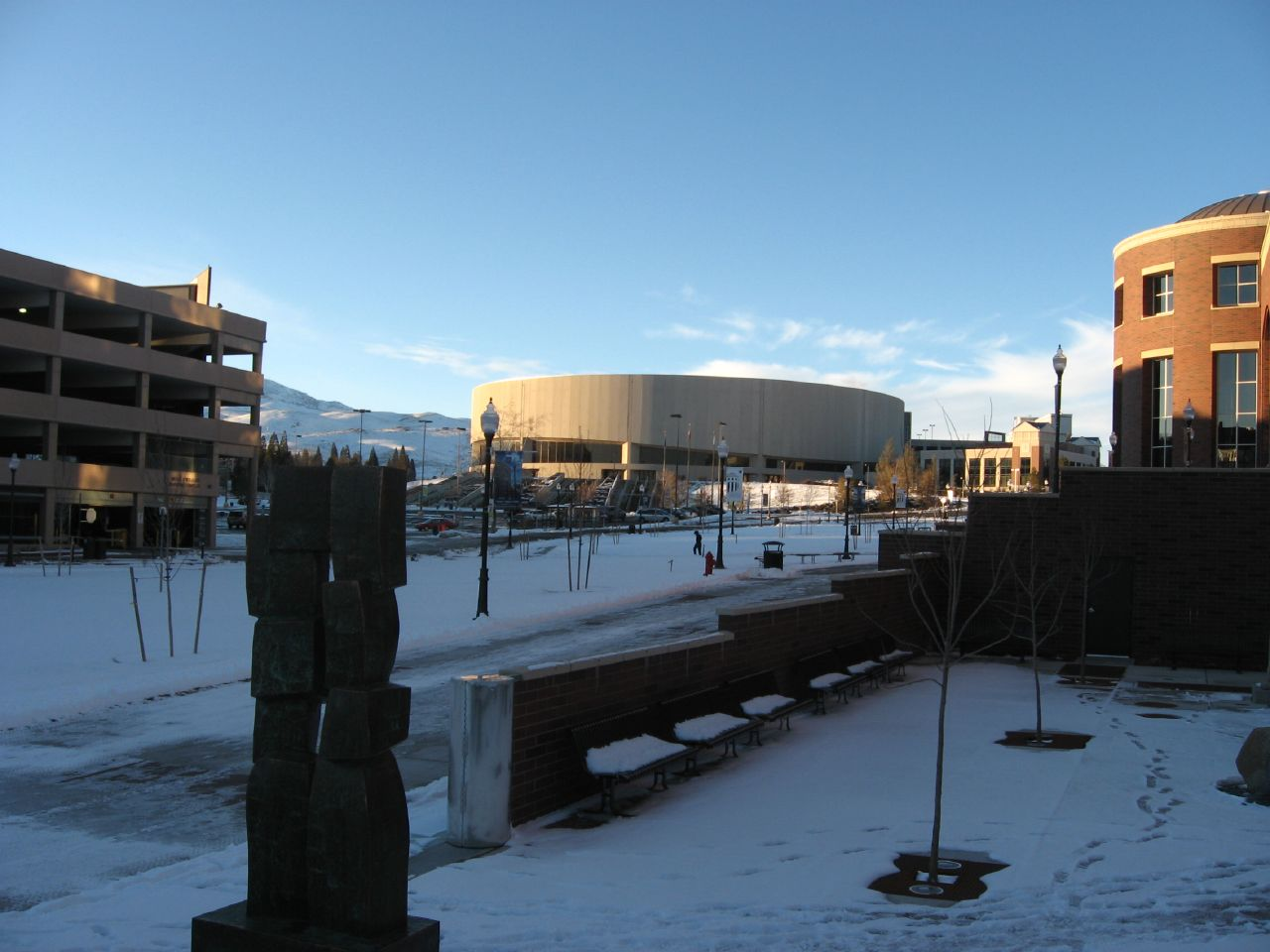

- Location in Nevada Location in the United States Location in North America
- Interactive map of Lawlor Events Center
- Address: 1500 North Virginia Street
- Location: Reno, Nevada, U.S.
- Coordinates: 39°32′42.25″N 119°49′5.77″W
- Owner: University of Nevada, Reno
- Operator: University of Nevada, Reno
- Capacity: 12,000
- Surface: Multi–surface

Construction
- Groundbreaking: October 1981
- Opened: November 4, 1983; 42 years ago
- Cost: $26 million ($84 million in 2025 dollars)
- Architects: Casazza, Peetz & Associates
- Structural engineer: Walter P. Moore and Associates, Inc.
- General contractors: The Law Company, Inc.

Tenant
- Nevada Wolf Pack (NCAA) (1983–present)

Lawlor Events Center is northern Nevada's largest multi-purpose arena. It is located in Reno, Nevada, at the intersection of North Virginia Street and 15th Street on the University of Nevada, Reno, campus. It is named after former athletic director, baseball, basketball and football coach Jake Lawlor.

It was built in 1983 and has a capacity of 12,000 including 11,536 multi-purpose seats. Lawlor is home to the Nevada Wolf Pack basketball teams, and also hosts boxing, concerts, conferences, PBR events, rodeos, WWE and other entertainment events. It is also the host for Washoe County School District high school graduations and winter commencement ceremonies for the university.

== History ==
Lawlor Events Center hosted the 1986 Big Sky Conference, 1996–2000 Big West Conference and 2005–2006 and 2009–2010 Western Athletic Conference men's basketball tournaments.

On Saturday, February 4, 1984 Duran Duran performed at Lawlor as part of their Sing Blue Silver world tour.

On Thursday, February 16, 1984 Genesis performed at Lawlor as part of their Mama Tour.

Van Halen played a sold-out show on May 7, 1984.

The music video for Eddie Money's 1986 single "Take Me Home Tonight" was filmed at the arena.

Bon Jovi played a sold-out show on January 23, 1987, during their Slippery When Wet Tour.

On April 21, 1990, Santana performed here as part of their Spirits Dancing in the Flesh Tour.

Tina Turner held her Twenty Four Seven Tour here on December 2, 2000.

On August 1, 2003, rock band Fleetwood Mac performed at Lawlor, as part of their Say You Will Tour.

On September 27, 2023, the Grand Sierra Resort, a casino resort in the city, announced a 10-year, $1 billion-plus expansion project. The project will include a new arena with a capacity of at least 10,000. Upon completion, Nevada men's basketball will move to the new arena, with women's basketball remaining at Lawlor. A groundbreaking ceremony for the new arena took place in September 2025, with the arena set to open in autumn of 2027.

== See also ==
- List of NCAA Division I basketball arenas
