= Best I Can (Queensrÿche song) =

Single by Queensrÿche

from the album Empire
- B-side: "I Dream In Infra Red" (Remix)
- Released: June 24, 1991
- Recorded: Spring 1990
- Genre: Heavy metal; progressive metal; hard rock
- Length: 5:37 (album version); 4:57 (single version)
- Label: EMI America
- Songwriter: Chris DeGarmo
- Producer: Peter Collins

Queensrÿche singles chronology
"Empire" (1991)	"Best I Can" (1991)	"Silent Lucidity" (1991)

Audio sample
- file; help

Music video
- "Best I Can" on YouTube

"Best I Can" is a song by American progressive metal band Queensrÿche, released in June 1991 as the third single from their fourth studio album, Empire.

== Background ==
In a November 2010 interview with Get Ready To Rock, front man Geoff Tate said of this uptempo track:

"It was a situation of us writing about handicapped people and their determination to reach their goals. A lot of people really embraced that song, people with serious disadvantages, and we are happy about that as it was a rallying song to get behind of and kind of inspired them to seek their goals and move in the right direction."

== Track listing ==
7" Single
No.	Title	Length
1.	"Best I Can" (Radio Edit)	4:53
2.	"I Dream In Infra Red" (1991 Acoustic Remix)	3:59

CD-Maxi
No.	Title	Length
1.	"Best I Can" (radio edit)	4:57
2.	"Best I Can" (full length version)	5:37
3.	"I Dream In Infrared" (1991 acoustic remix)	4:01
4.	"Prophecy" (live in Tokyo)	4:02

10" Maxi
No.	Title	Length
1.	"Best I Can" (Full Length Version)	5:37
2.	"I Dream In Infra Red" (1991 Acoustic Remix)	4:01
3.	"Prophecy" (Live in Tokyo)	4:02

== Chart performance ==
Chart (1991)	Peak position
US Mainstream Rock (Billboard)	28
UK Singles (OCC)	36

== Personnel ==
- Geoff Tate – lead vocals
- Chris DeGarmo – lead guitar, backing vocals, keyboards
- Michael Wilton – rhythm guitar
- Eddie Jackson – bass, backing vocals
- Scott Rockenfield – drums
