= Pima County Fair =

Annual funfair

- Genre: Funfair
- Dates: Usually on or near the final full week in April, including surrounding weekends
- Locations: 11300 S. Houghton Rd Tucson, Arizona
- Years active: 1911 - Present (except 1917-18, 1942-45, 2020-21)
- Organiser: Southwestern Fair Commission Inc.
- Website: http://www.pimacountyfair.com/

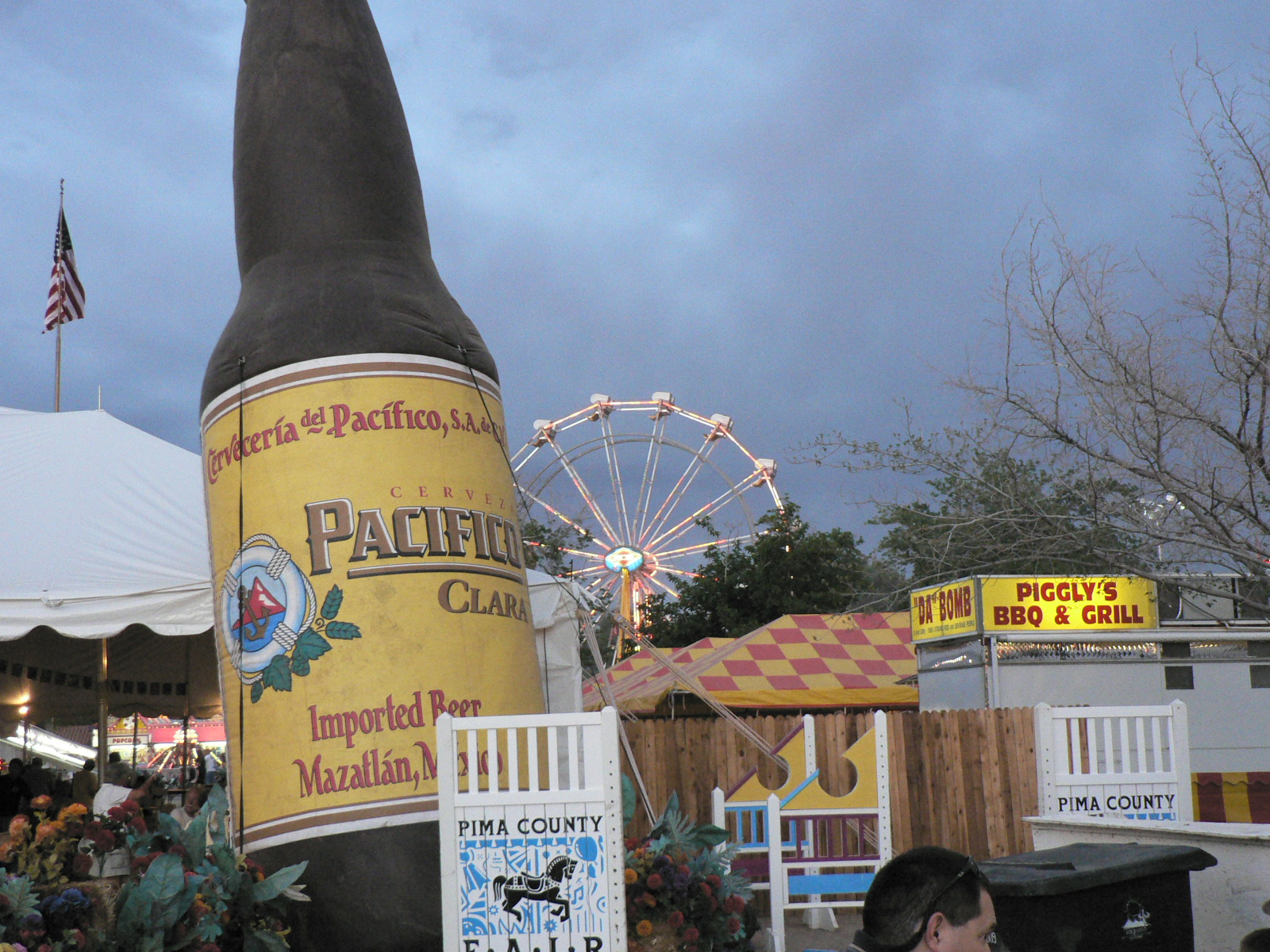
Pima County Fair, 2007

The Pima County Fair is a funfair that happens every year in Tucson, Arizona, the county seat of Pima County. The fair runs for 11 days in April. It features live animal shows, concerts, carnival rides and vendors. Hundreds of local groups perform every year. The Pima County Fair is one of the most popular attractions in Tucson.

== Pima County Fairgrounds ==
The Pima County Fairgrounds is a 640-acre facility located on the far southeastern edge of Tucson. It is home to the annual fair, first held in 1911 (and held somewhat sporadically in the years following, being held more regularly after World War II), as well as numerous trade shows, concerts and community events. For a few years in the 1930s, the fair was held in conjunction with the Tucson Rodeo.

For most of the 1960s and early 1970s was held in conjunction with, and operated by, the Southern Arizona International Livestock Show. The current Southwestern Fair Commission, a non-profit, private corporation, was established in 1975 by Pima County to operate the fairgrounds (the livestock show is still held on the fairgrounds as a separate event). Before relocating to the present site in 1972, the fair was held at the Tucson Rodeo grounds on South 6th Street as well as other locations in Tucson, including a site on South Campbell Avenue.

Located on its grounds, the Tucson Speedway was built in 1968 as a 3/8 mile clay auto racing track; it was paved in the 1990s and hosts NASCAR-sanctioned short track events. There are two outdoor amphitheaters, a covered beer garden/cantina, as well as two multi-purpose arenas, two outdoor arenas for horse events and a conference and events center. Ray Cammack Shows is the official carnival/midway provider for the fair.

== The 1st Pima County Fair ==
According to historian David Leighton, of the Arizona Daily Star newspaper, the first Pima County Fair was held from October 25–28, 1911. The Tucson Chamber of Commerce and the Pima County Fair Commission chose the Elysian Grove amusement park (located about where Carrillo School, south of the Tucson Convention Center is now at) as the location for the first fair. Elysian Grove consisted of two parts, the fields which were in the open and the pavilion which had a roof over it. The pavilion held three rows of booths that where rented by local Tucson businesses and also held displays of various items, as well as contests. During the four-day event there was a high school football game between Tucson High School and Phoenix High School, numerous animal exhibitions such as a stock show, dog show and poultry show as well as many displays put on by local educational institutions.

In 2020 the fair was cancelled due to the COVID-19 pandemic, and postponed in 2021 from April 15-25, to April 21-May 1, 2022, when it resumed. It also went on hiatus from 1917-18 and from 1942-45.

== Concert lineup (as of April 2013) ==
Performer	Date
Silversun Pickups	April 19
Skid Row Warrant & LA Guns	April 20
Hands & Feet - Hands & Feet	April 22
Tesla	April 24
Tyga	April 25
Hollywood Undead	April 26
Easton Corbin	April 27
Larry Hernandez	April 28

== Concert lineup (as of April 2014) ==
Performer	Date
Tyler Farr	April 17
Juicy J	April 18
Megadeth	April 19
Kottonmouth Kings	April 20
Bret Michaels	April 23
Kid Ink	April 24
Scott Weiland	April 25
Lee Brice	April 26
Voz De Mando	April 28
