= Jurahalle =

Jurahalle is a concert hall and event complex located in Neumarkt in der Oberpfalz, Germany. Built in 1981, the hall has a capacity of 3,500 people.
