= Souvenir: The Ultimate Collection =

Box set by Billy Joel
- Released: 17 December 1990
- Recorded: 1973–1990
- Genre: Rock
- Length: 3:50:42
- Label: Columbia
- Producers: Michael Stewart, Billy Joel, Mick Jones, Phil Ramone

Billy Joel chronology
Storm Front (1989)	Souvenir: The Ultimate Collection (1990)	River of Dreams (1993)

Souvenir: The Ultimate Collection is a Billy Joel album box set, released on 17 December 1990 in Australia only, to commemorate his sixth Australian tour. The five-album set spans most of Joel's recording career, containing Live at Yankee Stadium Highlights (five songs only), his 1985 double-album Greatest Hits, Volume I and II, his 1989 album Storm Front and a collection of interviews alongside the title track "Souvenir" (from his 1974 album Streetlife Serenade).

The box set entered the ARIA Australian Top 50 Album Charts on 13 January 1991 and peaked at number one in its third week on the chart, spending a total of 18 weeks on the chart and earning platinum accreditation.

== Track listing ==
=== Disc one: Live at Yankee Stadium ===
1. "Shout" (live) - 2:59
2. "Storm Front" (live) - 5:28
3. "New York State of Mind" (live) - 6:16
4. "I Go to Extremes" (live) - 4:46
5. "Piano Man" (live) - 6:14

=== Disc two: Greatest Hits, Volume I ===
1. "Piano Man" - 5:36
2. "Captain Jack" - 7:15
3. "The Entertainer" - 3:38
4. "Say Goodbye to Hollywood (Live) - 3:54
5. "New York State of Mind" - 6:02
6. "The Stranger" - 5:07
7. "Scenes from an Italian Restaurant" - 7:33
8. "Just the Way You Are" - 3:36
9. "Movin' Out (Anthony's Song)" - 3:28
10. "Only the Good Die Young" - 3:53
11. "She's Always a Woman" - 3:17

=== Disc three: Greatest Hits, Volume II ===
1. "My Life" - 3:51
2. "Big Shot" - 3:45
3. "Honesty" - 3:51
4. "You May Be Right" - 4:13
5. "It's Still Rock & Roll to Me" - 2:55
6. "She's Got a Way" (Live) - 3:00
7. "Pressure" - 3:15
8. "Allentown" - 3:48
9. "Goodnight Saigon" - 7:00
10. "Tell Her About It" - 3:35
11. "Uptown Girl" - 3:15
12. "The Longest Time" - 3:36
13. "You're Only Human (Second Wind)" - 4:48
14. "The Night Is Still Young" - 5:29

=== Disc four: Storm Front ===
1. "That's Not Her Style" - 5:10
2. "We Didn't Start the Fire" - 4:50
3. "The Downeaster 'Alexa'" - 3:44
4. "I Go to Extremes" - 4:23
5. "Shameless" - 4:26
6. "Storm Front" - 5:17
7. "Leningrad" - 4:06
8. "State of Grace" - 4:30
9. "When in Rome" - 4:50
10. "And So It Goes" - 3:38

=== Disc five: Interview with Billy Joel ===
1. "Introduction" - 1:15
2. "Billy Joel Interview 1" - 19:23
3. "Billy Joel Interview 2" - 18:40
4. "Billy Joel Interview 3" - 9:07
5. "Souvenir" - 2:00

== Charts ==
Chart (1991)	Peak position
Australian Albums (ARIA)	1

== Certifications ==
Region	Certification	Certified units/sales
Australia (ARIA)	Platinum	70,000^{^}
^{^} Shipments figures based on certification alone.
