= Storm Front Tour =

1989–1991 concert tour by Billy Joel

- Tour by Billy Joel
- Poster to the concert in Houston, USA
- Location: North America • Europe • Oceania • Asia
- Associated album: Storm Front
- Start date: December 2, 1989
- End date: March 24, 1991
- Legs: 8
- No. of shows: 172

Billy Joel concert chronology
- The Bridge Tour (1986–87); Storm Front Tour (1989–91); River of Dreams Tour (1993–95)

The Storm Front Tour was a 1989–1991 concert tour by singer-songwriter Billy Joel. This tour was the first tour by Joel in two years.

== Background ==
The recording of the album, which commenced in 1988, coincided with major changes in Joel's career and inaugurated a period of serious upheaval in his business affairs. In August 1989, just before the Storm Front album was released, Joel dismissed his manager (and former brother-in-law) Frank Weber after an audit revealed major discrepancies in Weber's accounting. Joel subsequently sued Weber for US$90 million, claiming fraud and breach of fiduciary duty. Because of this, Joel was in a huge financial gap, and to make the money back Joel toured extensively for a year and a half.

The album's producer Mick Jones gave Joel the idea of using different musicians on the album. Because of this, this tour marked a lot of changes with the band. Gone were Doug Stegmeyer on bass guitar, Russell Javors on rhythm guitar, David Lebolt on keyboards, and Peter Hewlett and George Simms on backing vocals. They were replaced by Schuyler Deale on bass guitar, Mindy Jostyn on violin and guitar (who was replaced with Tommy Byrnes on rhythm guitar partway through the tour), Jeff Jacobs on keyboards and Crystal Taliefero on percussion, saxophone, and guitar.

Following a rehearsal gig at the Suffolk County Police Academy in Westhampton, New York on December 2, 1989, the tour kicked off in Worcester, Massachusetts on December 6, 1989, and ended in Mexico City, Mexico on March 24, 1991.

The two concerts at Yankee Stadium on June 22 and 23, 1990 were professionally filmed for the video special Billy Joel: Live at Yankee Stadium, which was aired on television followed by a release on VHS in late 1990 and given a limited theatrical re-release in October 2022.

== Tour dates ==
Date	City	Country	Venue
North America
December 2, 1989	Westhampton	United States	Suffolk County Police Academy
December 6, 1989	Worcester	United States	The Centrum
December 8, 1989	Worcester	United States	The Centrum
December 9, 1989	Worcester	United States	The Centrum
December 12, 1989	Worcester	United States	The Centrum
December 13, 1989	Worcester	United States	The Centrum
December 17, 1989	Philadelphia	United States	The Spectrum
December 18, 1989	Philadelphia	United States	The Spectrum
December 21, 1989	Uniondale	United States	Nassau Veterans Memorial Coliseum
December 22, 1989	Uniondale	United States	Nassau Veterans Memorial Coliseum
December 27, 1989	Uniondale	United States	Nassau Veterans Memorial Coliseum
December 29, 1989	Uniondale	United States	Nassau Veterans Memorial Coliseum
December 31, 1989	Uniondale	United States	Nassau Veterans Memorial Coliseum
January 2, 1990	Hartford	United States	Hartford Civic Center
January 4, 1990	Hartford	United States	Hartford Civic Center
January 5, 1990	Hartford	United States	Hartford Civic Center
January 8, 1990	Hartford	United States	Hartford Civic Center
January 10, 1990	Landover	United States	Capital Centre
January 11, 1990	Landover	United States	Capital Centre
January 14, 1990	Philadelphia	United States	The Spectrum
January 15, 1990	Philadelphia	United States	The Spectrum
January 29, 1990	Philadelphia	United States	The Spectrum
January 30, 1990	Philadelphia	United States	The Spectrum
February 2, 1990	Syracuse	United States	Carrier Dome
February 3, 1990	Syracuse	United States	Carrier Dome
February 6, 1990	Toronto	Canada	Maple Leaf Gardens
February 8, 1990	Auburn Hills	United States	The Palace of Auburn Hills
February 9, 1990	Auburn Hills	United States	The Palace of Auburn Hills
February 12, 1990	Rosemont	United States	Rosemont Horizon
February 13, 1990	Rosemont	United States	Rosemont Horizon
February 16, 1990	Lexington	United States	Rupp Arena
February 18, 1990	Indianapolis	United States	Market Square Arena
February 19, 1990	Indianapolis	United States	Market Square Arena
February 22, 1990	Auburn Hills	United States	The Palace of Auburn Hills
February 23, 1990	Auburn Hills	United States	The Palace of Auburn Hills
February 26, 1990	Richfield	United States	Richfield Coliseum
March 2, 1990	Charlotte	United States	Charlotte Coliseum
March 3, 1990	Landover	United States	Capital Centre
March 6, 1990	St. Petersburg	United States	Florida Suncoast Dome
March 8, 1990	Miami	United States	Miami Arena
March 9, 1990	Miami	United States	Miami Arena
March 12, 1990	Miami	United States	Miami Arena
March 13, 1990	Miami	United States	Miami Arena
March 16, 1990	Miami	United States	Miami Arena
March 17, 1990	Miami	United States	Miami Arena
March 31, 1990	Los Angeles	United States	Los Angeles Memorial Sports Arena
April 2, 1990	Los Angeles	United States	Los Angeles Memorial Sports Arena
April 3, 1990	Los Angeles	United States	Los Angeles Memorial Sports Arena
April 6, 1990	Los Angeles	United States	Los Angeles Memorial Sports Arena
April 8, 1990	Los Angeles	United States	Los Angeles Memorial Sports Arena
April 9, 1990	Oakland	United States	Oakland–Alameda County Coliseum
April 13, 1990	Oakland	United States	Oakland–Alameda County Coliseum
April 15, 1990	Tacoma	United States	Tacoma Dome
April 17, 1990	Oakland	United States	Oakland–Alameda County Coliseum Arena
April 21, 1990	Denver	United States	McNichols Sports Arena
April 23, 1990	Rosemont	United States	Rosemont Horizon
April 24, 1990	Rosemont	United States	Rosemont Horizon
Europe
May 5, 1990	Cologne	Germany	Sporthalle
May 7, 1990	Frankfurt	Germany	Festhalle
May 9, 1990	Munich	Germany	Olympiahalle
May 11, 1990	Milan	Italy	PalaTrussardi
May 15, 1990	Hamburg	Germany	Alsterdorfer Sporthalle
May 17, 1990	Rotterdam	Netherlands	Ahoy
May 19, 1990	Copenhagen	Denmark	Valby-Hallen
May 21, 1990	London	England	Wembley Arena
May 22, 1990	London	England	Wembley Arena
May 25, 1990	London	England	Wembley Arena
May 26, 1990	London	England	Wembley Arena
May 29, 1990	London	England	Wembley Arena
May 30, 1990	London	England	Wembley Arena
June 2, 1990	Dublin	Ireland	RDS Arena
North America
June 17, 1990	Burgettstown	United States	Coca-Cola Star Lake Amphitheater
June 18, 1990	Burgettstown	United States	Coca-Cola Star Lake Amphitheater
June 19, 1990	East Rutherford	United States	Giants Stadium
June 22, 1990	The Bronx	United States	Yankee Stadium
June 23, 1990	The Bronx	United States	Yankee Stadium
June 27, 1990	Providence	United States	Providence Civic Center
June 29, 1990	Providence	United States	Providence Civic Center
June 30, 1990	Providence	United States	Providence Civic Center
July 3, 1990	Atlanta	United States	Omni Coliseum
July 5, 1990	Atlanta	United States	Omni Coliseum
July 7, 1990	Orlando	United States	Orlando Arena
July 8, 1990	Orlando	United States	Orlando Arena
July 11, 1990	Greensboro	United States	Greensboro Coliseum
July 13, 1990	Landover	United States	Capital Centre
July 15, 1990	Landover	United States	Capital Centre
July 17, 1990	Richfield	United States	Richfield Coliseum
July 21, 1990	Cincinnati	United States	Riverfront Coliseum
July 23, 1990	St. Louis	United States	St. Louis Arena
July 24, 1990	St. Louis	United States	St. Louis Arena
August 2, 1990	Calgary	Canada	Olympic Saddledome
August 5, 1990	Vancouver	Canada	Pacific Coliseum
August 6, 1990	Portland	United States	Portland Memorial Coliseum
August 9, 1990	Winnipeg	Canada	Winnipeg Arena
August 11, 1990	East Troy	United States	Alpine Valley Music Theatre
August 12, 1990	Cincinnati	United States	Riverfront Coliseum
August 15, 1990	Hershey	United States	Hersheypark Stadium
August 18, 1990	East Rutherford	United States	Giants Stadium
August 19, 1990	East Rutherford	United States	Giants Stadium
August 22, 1990	Montreal	Canada	Montreal Forum
August 23, 1990	Hamilton	Canada	Copps Coliseum
August 29, 1990 (Note: The concerts on August 29, September 4, and September 5 at the Jones Beach Theater were benefit shows for the Bays and Baymen.)	Wantagh	United States	Jones Beach Theater
September 4, 1990	Wantagh	United States	Jones Beach Theater
September 5, 1990	Wantagh	United States	Jones Beach Theater
Europe
September 28, 1990	Dortmund	Germany	Westfalenhallen
September 29, 1990	Berlin	Germany	Waldbühne
October 4, 1990	Hanover	Germany	Messehalle
October 5, 1990	Stuttgart	Germany	Hanns-Martin-Schleyer-Halle
October 8, 1990	Brussels	Belgium	Forest National
October 10, 1990	Birmingham	England	NEC Arena
October 11, 1990	Birmingham	England	NEC Arena
October 13, 1990	Rotterdam	Netherlands	Ahoy
October 16, 1990	Frankfurt	Germany	Festhalle
October 17, 1990	Zürich	Switzerland	Hallenstadion
October 20, 1990	Linz	Austria	Sporthalle
October 25, 1990	Rome	Italy	Palazzo dello Sport
North America
November 7, 1990	San Diego	United States	San Diego Sports Arena
November 9, 1990	Phoenix	United States	Desert Sky Pavilion
November 11, 1990	Salt Lake City	United States	Salt Palace
November 13, 1990	Minneapolis	United States	Target Center
November 15, 1990	Minneapolis	United States	Target Center
November 16, 1990	Minneapolis	United States	Target Center
November 19, 1990	Minneapolis	United States	Target Center
November 21, 1990	Kansas City	United States	Kemper Arena
November 23, 1990	Houston	United States	The Summit
November 25, 1990	Dallas	United States	Reunion Arena
November 27, 1990	Austin	United States	Frank Erwin Center
November 28, 1990	Houston	United States	The Summit
December 1, 1990	Ames	United States	Hilton Coliseum
December 2, 1990	Ames	United States	Hilton Coliseum
December 6, 1990	Indianapolis	United States	Market Square Arena
December 8, 1990	Buffalo	United States	Buffalo Memorial Auditorium
December 9, 1990	Albany	United States	Knickerbocker Arena
December 12, 1990	Pittsburgh	United States	Civic Arena
December 13, 1990	Buffalo	United States	Buffalo Memorial Auditorium
December 16, 1990	Albany	United States	Knickerbocker Arena
December 17, 1990	Albany	United States	Knickerbocker Arena
December 18, 1990	Albany	United States	Knickerbocker Arena
Asia
January 2, 1991	Tokyo	Japan	Tokyo Dome
January 3, 1991	Tokyo	Japan	Tokyo Dome
January 6, 1991	Osaka	Japan	Osaka-jō Hall
January 7, 1991	Osaka	Japan	Osaka-jō Hall
January 10, 1991	Yokohama	Japan	Yokohama Arena
January 12, 1991	Nagoya	Japan	Rainbow Hall
January 13, 1991	Osaka	Japan	Osaka-jō Hall
January 15, 1991	Zambales	Philippines	Naval Base Subic Bay
January 16, 1991	Luzon	Philippines	Clark Air Base
Oceania
January 22, 1991	Sydney	Australia	Sydney Entertainment Centre
January 23, 1991	Sydney	Australia	Sydney Entertainment Centre
January 26, 1991	Sydney	Australia	Sydney Entertainment Centre
January 27, 1991	Sydney	Australia	Sydney Entertainment Centre
January 30, 1991	Sydney	Australia	Sydney Entertainment Centre
February 1, 1991	Sydney	Australia	Sydney Entertainment Centre
February 2, 1991	Sydney	Australia	Sydney Entertainment Centre
February 6, 1991	Brisbane	Australia	Brisbane Entertainment Centre
February 8, 1991	Brisbane	Australia	Brisbane Entertainment Centre
February 9, 1991	Brisbane	Australia	Brisbane Entertainment Centre
February 12, 1991	Adelaide	Australia	Memorial Drive Park
February 16, 1991	Perth	Australia	Subiaco Oval
February 20, 1991	Melbourne	Australia	National Tennis Centre
February 21, 1991	Melbourne	Australia	National Tennis Centre
February 24, 1991	Melbourne	Australia	National Tennis Centre
February 25, 1991	Melbourne	Australia	National Tennis Centre
February 28, 1991	Melbourne	Australia	National Tennis Centre
March 2, 1991	Sydney	Australia	Sydney Entertainment Centre
March 4, 1991	Sydney	Australia	Sydney Entertainment Centre
March 5, 1991	Sydney	Australia	Sydney Entertainment Centre
March 10, 1991	Sydney	Australia	Sydney Entertainment Centre
North America
March 19, 1991	Mexico City	Mexico	Palacio de los Deportes
March 20, 1991	Mexico City	Mexico	Palacio de los Deportes
March 23, 1991	Mexico City	Mexico	Palacio de los Deportes
March 24, 1991	Mexico City	Mexico	Palacio de los Deportes
Post-tour shows
August 8, 1991	Montauk	United States	Deep Hallow Ranch
August 9, 1991	Montauk	United States	Deep Hallow Ranch
October 21, 1991 (Note: The concerts on October 21 and 22 at Madison Square Garden were benefit shows for the Walden Woods Project.)	New York City	United States	Madison Square Garden
October 22, 1991	New York City	United States	Madison Square Garden

== Setlist ==
This setlist is from the June 22, 1990 show at Yankee Stadium. It does not represent all the dates throughout the tour.

1. "Storm Front"
2. "Allentown"
3. "Prelude/Angry Young Man"
4. "Take Me Out to the Ball Game"
5. "Scenes from an Italian Restaurant"
6. "The Downeaster "Alexa""
7. "Goodnight Saigon"
8. "I Go to Extremes"
9. "Pressure"
10. "My Life"
11. "An Innocent Man"
12. "Shameless"
13. "We Didn't Start the Fire"
14. "Shout"
15. "Uptown Girl"
16. "It's Still Rock and Roll to Me"
17. "You May Be Right"
18. "Only the Good Die Young"
19. "Miami 2017 (Seen the Lights Go Out on Broadway)"
20. "A Matter of Trust"
21. "Big Shot"
22. "New York State of Mind"
23. "Piano Man"

== Personnel ==
- Billy Joel – lead vocals, piano, keyboards, harmonica, rhythm guitar
- Mark Rivera – saxophone, flute, clarinet, vocals, percussion, keyboards, rhythm guitar
- Schuyler Deale – bass guitar, vocals
- David Brown – lead guitar, vocals
- Mindy Jostyn – violin, guitar (December 2, 1989 – March 17, 1990)
- Tommy Byrnes – rhythm guitar (March 31, 1990 – March 24, 1991)
- Jeff Jacobs – keyboards
- Crystal Taliefero – percussion, saxophone, guitar.
- Liberty DeVitto – drums, percussion
