= Live at Yankee Stadium (Billy Joel video) =

1990 concert video by Billy Joel

Video by Billy Joel
- Released: September 1990
- Recorded: June 22 and 23, 1990
- Venue: Yankee Stadium (New York City)
- Genre: Rock
- Length: 85 minutes
- Label: Columbia
- Producers: Jon Small; Steve Cohen

Billy Joel chronology
| Eye of the Storm (1990) | Live at Yankee Stadium (1990) | Greatest Hits Volume III: The Video (1997) |

Billy Joel: Live at Yankee Stadium is the fourth video album by American singer-songwriter Billy Joel. It was recorded during two concerts of the Storm Front Tour at Yankee Stadium in New York City on June 22 and 23, 1990. It was televised on September 2, 1990, released on VHS later that year, and released on DVD in late 2000. The video album was certified Platinum by the RIAA.

Joel’s two performances at Yankee Stadium on June 22 and 23, 1990 were part of the Storm Front Tour. The concerts were filmed over two nights using 16 mm film and recorded for a planned television and home video release.

== Chapter listing ==
All songs written by Billy Joel, except "Shout" (Isley Brothers).

1. Program Start
2. Opening
3. "Storm Front"
4. "I Go to Extremes"
5. "Scenes from an Italian Restaurant"
6. "The Downeaster 'Alexa'"
7. "Pressure"
8. "New York State of Mind"
9. "We Didn't Start the Fire"
10. "Shout"
11. "That's Not Her Style"
12. "Miami 2017 (Seen the Lights Go Out on Broadway)"
13. "A Matter of Trust"
14. "Piano Man"

Live at Yankee Stadium

Live album by Billy Joel
- Released: November 4, 2022
- Recorded: June 22 and 23, 1990
- Venue: Yankee Stadium (New York City)
- Genre: Rock
- Length: 1 hour, 43 minutes
- Label: Columbia
- Producers: Jon Small; Steve Cohen; John Jackson

Billy Joel chronology
| Live at the Great American Music Hall 1975 (2023) | Live at Yankee Stadium (2022) | The Vinyl Collection, Vol. 1 (2023) |

== Remastered version ==
The concert was remastered in 2022 and given a limited theatrical release on October 5 and 9, 2022. The re-mastered concert, with additional songs, was released on CD and DVD on November 4, 2022. Joel is the only recording artist to perform at Yankee Stadium, Giants Stadium and Shea Stadium.

== Historical significance ==
The Yankee Stadium concerts have been cited as one of Joel’s most remembered live performances, reflecting both his status as a New York-born artist and his popularity at the height of his commercial success in the early 1990s. The shows contributed to a broader trend of large-scale stadium concert films that became increasingly common during the late 20th century.

== Track listing ==
=== CD ===
All songs written by Billy Joel.

Disc 1

1. "Storm Front" - 5:33
2. "Allentown" – 3:55
3. "Prelude/Angry Young Man" – 5:22
4. "I Go to Extremes" – 4:22
5. "New York State of Mind" – 6:10
6. "The Downeaster 'Alexa'" – 4:43
7. "My Life" – 4:41
8. "Shameless" – 4:28
9. "Scenes from an Italian Restaurant" – 7:24
10. "Pressure" – 5:21
11. "Miami 2017 (Seen the Lights Go Out on Broadway)" – 4:31
12. "Uptown Girl" – 3:08

Disc 2

1. "We Didn't Start the Fire" – 5:10
2. "A Matter of Trust" – 4:13
3. "Only the Good Die Young" – 3:42
4. "That's Not Her Style" – 5:41
5. "Big Shot" – 5:12
6. "Goodnight Saigon" – 7:21
7. "It's Still Rock and Roll to Me" – 3:17
8. "An Innocent Man" – 6:10
9. "You May Be Right" – 4:58
10. "Piano Man" – 5:30

=== DVD ===
All songs written by Billy Joel, except "Shout" (Isley Brothers) and "Take Me Out to the Ball Game" (Jack Norworth, Albert Von Tilzer).

1. "Storm Front"
2. Open / "Take Me Out to the Ballgame"
3. "Scenes from an Italian Restaurant"
4. "The Downeaster 'Alexa'"
5. "I Go to Extremes"
6. "Pressure"
7. Yankee Stadium Story, Part 1
8. "New York State of Mind"
9. "We Didn't Start the Fire"
10. "Shout" (parts 1 and 2)
11. "Uptown Girl"
12. Yankee Stadium Story, Part 2
13. "That's Not Her Style"
14. "Miami 2017 (Seen the Lights Go Out on Broadway)"
15. "A Matter of Trust"
16. "Piano Man"
17. Credits

== Personnel ==
=== CD credits ===
- Mastered by – Ted Jensen
- Mixed by – Jake Davis, Jay Vicari, Tom Davis
- Produced by Brian Ruggles, John Jackson, Steve Cohen, and Jon Small

=== Film credits ===
- Directed by Jon Small
- Produced by Jon Small and Steve Cohen
- Executive producers – Jerry Durbin, Deborah Newman, and Jeff Schock
- Editors - Greg Dougherty (1990 version), Adam Little (2022 remastered version)
- Director of photography – Jeff Zimmerman
- Co-producer – Stephen Saporta

=== The band ===
- Billy Joel – vocals, piano, guitar, accordion, harmonica
- Crystal Taliefero – percussion, backing vocals, saxophone, guitar
- Liberty DeVitto – drums
- Mark Rivera – saxophone, flute, percussion, backing vocals
- David Brown – lead guitar, percussion, backing vocals
- Schuyler Deale – bass guitar
- Jeff Jacobs – keyboards
- Tommy Byrnes – rhythm guitar, backing vocals
- Lisa Germano – violin ("The Downeaster 'Alexa'")
