= Susan Lacy =

Susan Lacy may refer to:

- Susan Lacy (producer), creator of American Masters
- Suzanne Lacy (born 1945), American artist and educator
