= Jon Small =

American drummer (1947–2026)

- Born: January 3, 1947; Long Island, New York, US
- Died: September 4, 2026 (aged 79) West Palm Beach, Florida, US
- Genres: Rock, soul
- Occupations: Drummer, video director
- Instrument: Drums
- Years active: 1964–2026
- Formerly of: The Hassles, Attila

Jonathan Craig Small (January 3, 1947 – September 4, 2026) was an American drummer and director. He was the drummer for two groups in Billy Joel's early career, The Hassles and Attila, the latter of which was a duo consisting of Small and Joel. Small later became a music video director.

== Early life ==
Small was born on Long Island, New York, on January 3, 1947. His father was a musician and his mother owned a wallpaper store.

== Career ==
From 1964 to 1969, Small was the drummer for The Hassles, a psych rock/soul group who never achieved commercial success, but are best remembered for featuring a young Billy Joel. After the Hassles disbanded in 1969, Small and Joel formed the duo Attila. Active for only one year, they released a self-titled album, which notably was not received well, even being called "the worst album released in the history of rock & roll—hell, the history of recorded music itself" by AllMusic. Small and Joel's initial partnership came to an end in 1970, when Small's partner, Elizabeth, ran off with Joel. Small and Joel would reconcile years later, with Joel later admitting he regretted the affair when they reflected on the relationship in the 2025 documentary Billy Joel: And So It Goes.

Small became a video director, shooting/directing music videos and concert films. He directed the music video for the "The Greatest Love of All" by Whitney Houston, "Walk This Way" by Aerosmith/Run-DMC, and "Standing Outside the Fire" by Garth Brooks. Small also directed music videos for Reba McEntire, Enrique Iglesias, Brooks & Dunn and The Highwaymen. Small would also start working with Joel again, helping shoot some of Joel's concert films, including Live From Long Island (1982) and Live at Shea Stadium (filmed 2008, released 2011), as well as directing the music video to his song "Baby Grand".

== Personal life ==
Small was married to Elizabeth Weber until 1970. He was married to his second wife, Jeanine, for more than 40 years, until Small's death. He had two children, one with each wife.

== Death ==
Small died from cancer in West Palm Beach, Florida, on September 4, 2026, at the age of 79.

== Credits ==
Drummer

- The Hassles – The Hassles (1968)
- Hour of the Wolf – The Hassles (1969)
- Attila – Attila (1970)

Director/producer (live recordings)

- This Day And Age – D.L. Byron (1980)
- Live: Long Island – Billy Joel (1982)
- Live! – The Highwaymen (1986)
- Greatest Hits Live – Neil Diamond (1988)
- Live at Yankee Stadium – Billy Joel (1990)
- Live – Reba McEntire (1995)
- The Essential Neil Diamond – Neil Diamond (2001)
- A Night of Rapture Live – Anita Baker (2004)
- My Sinatra: The Songs and the Stories – Cary Hoffman (2004)
- Piano Man: The Best Of Billy Joel – Billy Joel (2004)
- Velvet Rope Tour/Live In Hawaii – Janet Jackson (204)
- My Lives – Billy Joel (2005)
- Video Gold, Vol. I – Reba McEntire (2006)
- The Ultimate Hits – Garth Brooks (2007)
- Live at Shea Stadium: The Concert – Billy Joel (2011)
- Blame It All on My Roots: Five Decades of Influences – Garth Brooks (2013)
- Live: American Outlaws – The Highwaymen (2016)
