= Honesty (Billy Joel song) =

- Dutch, French and German vinyl picture sleeve

Single by Billy Joel

from the album 52nd Street
- B-side: "The Mexican Connection", "Root Beer Rag"
- Released: April 1979
- Recorded: 1978
- Studio: A&R Recording, Inc., 799 7th Avenue at 52nd Street, New York City
- Genre: Soft rock
- Length: 3:53
- Label: Columbia
- Songwriter: Billy Joel
- Producer: Phil Ramone

Billy Joel singles chronology
| "Big Shot" (1979) | "Honesty" (1979) | "Until the Night" (1979) |

Music video
- "Honesty" on YouTube

"Honesty" is a song by American singer-songwriter Billy Joel, released by Columbia Records as the third US single from his sixth studio album 52nd Street (1978) in 1979. "Honesty" was solely written by Joel, while production was handled by Phil Ramone. The song appears on the Dutch and Japanese editions of Greatest Hits Volume 2, replacing "Don't Ask Me Why" (1980).

The song received mostly positive reviews from music critics, who generally praised its lyrics and piano instrumentation. It also received comparisons to other songs by Joel. "Honesty" peaked at number 24 on the US Billboard Hot 100 chart, becoming the album's third consecutive top 40 hit. It went to Number 1 in France and has also been certified gold by Recording Industry Association of Japan for ringtone download sales of over 100,000 units. Joel performed the song live several times with Elton John and later with Bryan Adams. "Honesty" has been covered and sampled by various artists, including American R&B recording artist Beyoncé.

== Background and composition ==
"Honesty" was solely written by Billy Joel while production was handled by Phil Ramone. It is the second song from his sixth studio album 52nd Street (1978). David Spinozza plays the acoustic guitar in the song, Liberty DeVitto plays the drums and Robert Freedman the horn and string orchestration.

"Honesty" is a piano ballad with synthesizer embellishments. It opens with "sad and tender" piano chords. According to Ken Bielen in his book The Words and Music of Billy Joel, Liberty DeVitto's drums and cymbal crashes remind listeners that "the track is a predecessor of the power ballads of the 1980s and 1990s". It talks about the inherent lack of honesty even in the closest of relationships. In the song Joel sings the lines "Honesty is such a lonely word". Joel further sings about wearing his heart on his sleeve in "Honesty". According to Chuck Klosterman of The New York Times, "[the song] implies that the only way you can tell that someone really cares about you is if they tell you you're bad." "Leningrad" (1989), a song from Joel's eleventh studio album Storm Front, has been compared to "Honesty". According to the sheet music published on the website Musicnotes.com by Faber Music, "Honesty" is a pop rock and classical rock song written in the key of B♭ major. The song is set in common time and performed in a slow tempo of 80 beats per minute. Joel's vocals range from the note of B_{b2} to B_{b4}.

In an interview with Rick Beato, Joel reveals while writing the song that he felt he was being hypocritical, saying, "Who the hell am I to preach to somebody about being honest? 'Cause I'm a lying sack of crap.", explaining he hadn't written lyrics at that point but it was important to have an 'ee' (/iː/) vowel sound. Joel's drummer at the time, Liberty DeVitto, suggested he use 'sodomy'. Joel disliked it so much, that he made himself write lyrics, recalling, "I [had] to come up with lyrics right away, because otherwise it'll forever be 'Sodomy'".

== Release and critical reception ==
While reviewing 52nd Street, Stephen Thomas Erlewine of the website AllMusic noted that "Honesty" was one of Joel's best songs. Timothy White of Billboard magazine called the song a pensive pop hit. Billboard also said of it that "The melody Is catchy and Joel's vocal evokes much warmth and feeling." Cash Box called it "a provocative and melodic ballad full of words and meanings" with "emphatic" piano chording and drumming and said that "background strings sweeten the emotion". Record World called it "a big ballad featuring Joel's sensitive vocals and piano style". Paul Evans wrote in the Rolling Stone Album Guide that "The sweet music of 'Honesty' is sabotaged by trite lyrics". The Phoenix's Michael Lawson noted that the song was "well suited for middle-of-the-road tastes". According to Ken Bielen, "'Honesty' is a plea for truth, not only in romantic relationships but also from the politicians who affect our lives." Adam Graham of MTV News described the song as a "big ballad". The song was nominated in the category for Song of the Year at the 22nd Grammy Awards held on February 27, 1980.

"Honesty" peaked at number 16 on the Canadian Singles Chart. On July 28, 1979, the song debuted at number 31 on the Dutch Top 40 which later become its peak position. The next week, the song fell seven positions placing at number thirty eight. However, on August 11, 1979, "Honesty" charted at number 35 before falling out of the chart the next week. In New Zealand, "Honesty" debuted at number 47, on June 10, 1979, and later peaked at number 38. After its peak position, the song fell out of the chart. On the Billboard Hot 100 chart in the US, the song peaked at number 24. In May 2009, Joel's version was certified gold by Recording Industry Association of Japan for ringtone download sales of over 100,000 units. It saw its greatest chart peak in France, going all the way to Number 1, spending eight weeks in that position. It ranked as the 10th biggest French hit of the 1970s, and as of 2018, the 90th biggest French hit of all time.

The song was also included on South Korean and Japanese edition of Joel's 1985 compilation Greatest Hits Volume 2 as one of the bonus tracks. The song wasn't included on any of Joel's US released compilation packages; however, it appears on the Dutch edition as well as the aforementioned Japanese edition of Greatest Hits Volume 2, instead of "Don't Ask Me Why" (1980).

== Live performances ==
Joel performed the song with Elton John at Giants Stadium in East Rutherford, New Jersey in July 1994. First, they sang "Your Song" (1970) by John and after that they performed "Honesty" while playing on the piano. "Honesty" was also performed by John and Joel on March 29, 1995, in SkyDome, Toronto. The same routine was performed in May 1998 in Dublin. On July 31, 2006, Joel performed the song at a free concert at the Colosseum, Rome, Italy.

== Versions ==
There are two video versions; one that uses the album track and another that uses a version slightly different from the album track. Both versions are identical until the last verse (3:20) which uses different vocals (this version is not available on The Essential Video Collection).

== Personnel ==
Credits for "Honesty" adapted from 52nd Street liner notes.

- Billy Joel – writing, vocals, acoustic piano
- David Spinozza – acoustic guitar
- Doug Stegmeyer – bass guitar
- Liberty DeVitto – drums
- Robert Freedman – horn and string orchestrations
- Phil Ramone – producer

== Track listing ==
- US single
1. "Honesty" – 3:53
2. "The Mexican Connection" – 3:38
- Dutch single/CBS 7150
1. "Honesty" – 3:53
2. "Root Beer Rag" – 2:59
- CBS single
1. "Honesty"
2. "My Life"

== Charts ==
=== Weekly charts ===
| Chart (1979) | Peak position |
|---|---|
| Argentina (CAPIF) | 1 |
| Australia (Kent Music Report) | 80 |
| Canada (RPM) Top Singles | 16 |
| Canada (RPM) Adult Contemporary | 4 |
| Finland (Suomen virallinen lista) | 29 |
| France (IFOP) | 1 |
| Israel (IBA) | 15 |
| Italy (Musica e Dischi) | 10 |
| Japan (Oricon Singles Chart) | 53 |
| Netherlands (Single Top 100) | 31 |
| New Zealand (Recorded Music NZ) | 38 |
| South African Singles Chart | 8 |
| UK Airplay (Radio & Record News) | 26 |
| US Billboard Hot 100 | 24 |
| US Billboard Adult Contemporary | 9 |
| Zimbabwe Singles Chart | 20 |

=== Year-end charts ===
| Chart (1979) | Rank |
|---|---|
| Canada | 122 |
| U.S. (Joel Whitburn's Pop Annual) | 155 |

== Certifications ==
| Region | Certification | Certified units/sales |
|---|---|---|
| France (SNEP) | Gold | 500,000^{*} |
| Japan (RIAJ) CD Single | Gold | 50,000^{^} |
| Japan (RIAJ) Full-length ringtone | Gold | 100,000^{*} |
| United States (RIAA) | Gold | 500,000^{‡} |
^{*} Sales figures based on certification alone.^{^} Shipments figures based on certification alone.^{‡} Sales+streaming figures based on certification alone.

== Beyoncé version ==
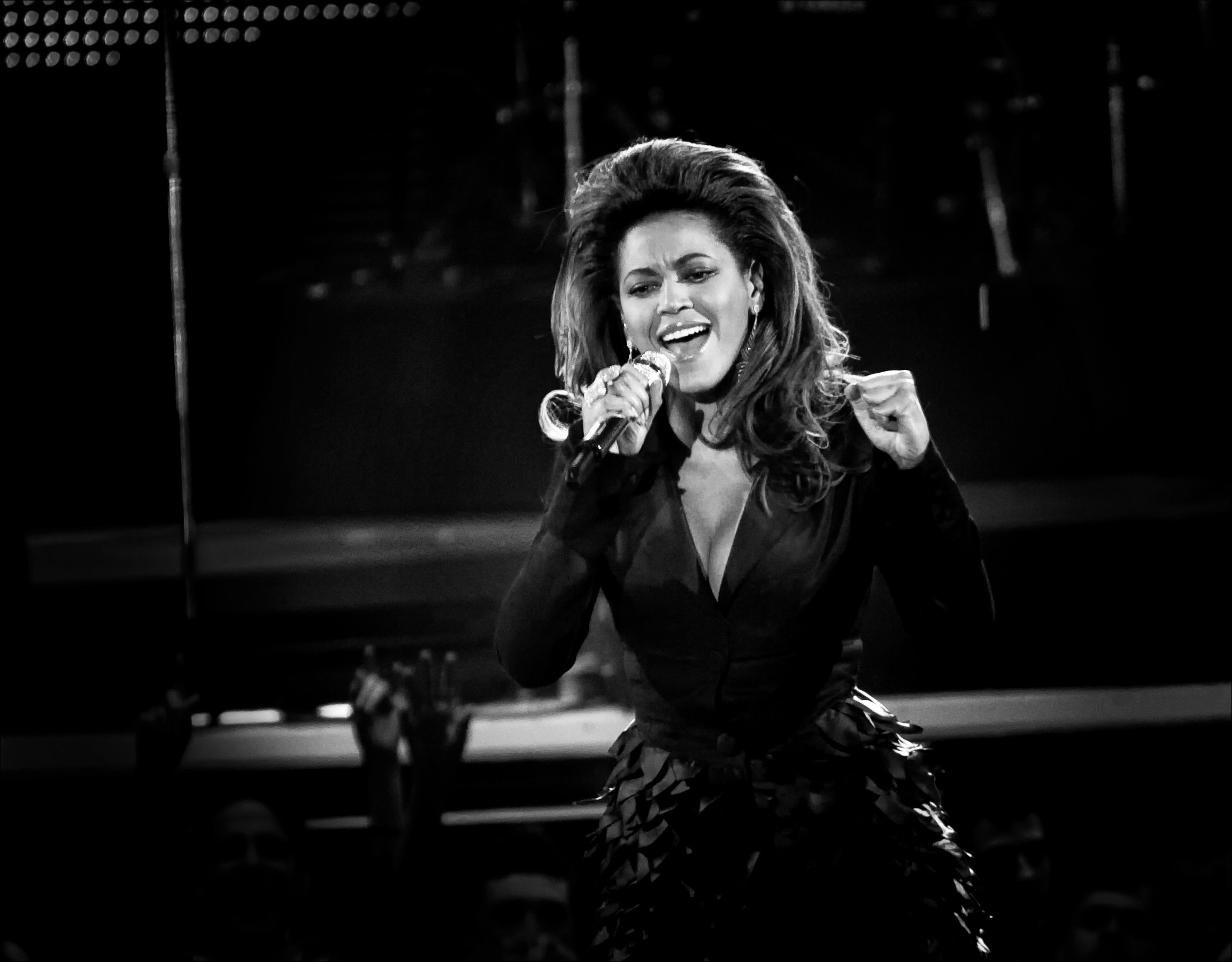
Beyoncé (pictured; 2008) covered "Honesty" for her album I Am... Sasha Fierce.

In 2008, American recording artist, Beyoncé re-recorded Billy Joel's version of the song produced by Scott Storch for a compilation album of her former group Destiny's Child, titled Mathew Knowles & Music World Present Vol.1: Love Destiny. The song was later included on the platinum edition of her third solo album, I Am... Sasha Fierce (2008). Pip Ellwood of Entertainment Focus described Knowles' version of the song as a "turgid" ballad that doesn't "add too much to the record". Serving as the sixteenth track to Knowles' platinum edition re-release of I Am... Sasha Fierce, the song contrasts with previous tracks such as "Why Don't You Love Me". It showcases Knowles' "soulful" voice and "outstanding" vocal range as stated by Hannah Spencer of the website Allgigs. Ken Bielen in his book The Words and Music of Billy Joel wrote, "Backed primarily by an electronic keyboard and an urban rhythm and blues arrangement, she stays faithful to the original ballad with a bittersweet vocal performance." "Honesty" was performed during Knowles' concert at the Olympic Gymnastics Arena in Seoul on October 20, 2009, as part of her worldwide I Am... Tour (2009–10). The song became very popular on the South Korea Gaon International charts, peaking at number two. It became the 9th and 173rd best-selling single in 2010 and 2011 in South Korea respectively selling over 800,000 digital downloads.

=== Charts ===
==== Weekly charts ====
| Chart (2010) | Peak position |
|---|---|
| CIS Airplay (TopHit) | 196 |
| South Korea Gaon International Chart | 2 |
| Chart (2011) | Peak position |
| South Korea Gaon International Chart | 2 |

==== Year-end charts ====
| Chart (2010) | Rank |
|---|---|
| South Korea Gaon International Chart | 9 |
| Chart (2011) | Rank |
| South Korea Gaon International Chart | 173 |
