= Root Beer Rag =

- Label to the US single release as B-side of "Big Shot"

Instrumental by Billy Joel

from the album Streetlife Serenade
- A-side: "Big Shot" (US) "Until the Night" (UK) "Honesty" (Japan & others)
- Released: October 11, 1974 (album); 1979 (single)
- Recorded: Devonshire Sound, North Hollywood, CA
- Genre: Ragtime
- Length: 2:59
- Label: Columbia Records
- Songwriter: Billy Joel
- Producer: Michael Stewart

"Root Beer Rag" is a composition from Billy Joel's 1974 album Streetlife Serenade. An instrumental track in a very fast ragtime style, it was later released as the B-side of several singles from Joel's 52nd Street album, including "Big Shot" in the US, "Until the Night" in the UK, and "Honesty" in Japan and some European countries. A live version was included with the DVD that was part of the 30th anniversary re-release of The Stranger.

The piece is in C major (though the recording is sped up a microtone (1/4 of a tone)) and is one of three studio instrumentals that Joel has released. Joel has played the piece in concert frequently over the years, stating that he uses it as "a kind of instrumental palate cleanser." He further stated that it requires his "full attention as the notes spill out."

== Background ==
Author Ken Bielen describes "Root Beer Rag" as a fast ragtime piano work. Joel biographer Hank Bordowitz describes the composition as "homebrewed ragtime". Music critic Mark Bego describes it as Joel "doing his best Scott Joplin impersonation" and "his one recorded ragtime number."

In response to an audience question about the song's origin during one of Joel's musical lectures, he gave the following explanation:

I got my first Moog Synthesizer. This was in the mid 70s and I got my first Moog and I put it on every record. I said 'I have to write an instrumental where I can use this Moog Synthesizer.' It kinda turned me off the synthesizers forever after. That's why I wrote that song. Just purely out of stupid self-indulgence.

However, Joel did feature synthesizers on subsequent albums, including Turnstiles (1976), The Stranger (1977) - as credited in the liner notes and there is a Mellotron on "She's Always a Woman" - Glass Houses (1980), The Nylon Curtain (1982), The Bridge (1986), Storm Front (1989) and River of Dreams (1993).

Other instruments include a pedal steel guitar and drums, the latter of which are played with drum brushes. A figure used in the beginning and then throughout the song is similar to one that Joel would use the introductions of later songs, including "Prelude/Angry Young Man."

It was used as the opening theme to Siskel and Ebert's first incarnation of their movie review program, Opening Soon at a Theater Near You, which aired monthly on PBS member station WTTW.

== Critical reception ==
AllMusic critic Stephen Thomas Erlewine called the tune "admittedly enjoyable" and suggests that it was influenced by the movie The Sting and that movie's Scott Joplin-based soundtrack. Bego praises Joel's "stellar" piano work noting "lightning fast keyboard work." However, Rolling Stone critic Stephen Holden describes it as "nothing more than filler."
