= We Didn't Start the Fire (podcast) =

History podcast

- Genre: History, pop culture

Cast and voices
- Hosted by: Katie Puckrik; Tom Fordyce

Publication
- Original release: January 25, 2021 – June 19, 2023

Related
- Website: crowdnetwork.co.uk/podcasts/we-didnt-start-the-fire/

We Didn't Start the Fire is a modern history podcast that ran from January 2021 to June 2023. It was hosted by Katie Puckrik and Tom Fordyce and produced by Crowd Network.

== Premise ==
The podcast takes topics from the pop song "We Didn't Start the Fire", released by Billy Joel in 1989. The song lists, via a series of fast-paced lyrics, brief references to 118 significant political, cultural, scientific, and sporting events between 1949, the year of Joel's birth, and 1989, in a mainly chronological order. The podcast looks at these in turn with expert guests, with topics including the politics of Harry S. Truman, space exploration, rock'n'roll and also including American, Korean and Cuba–Soviet Union relations at the height of the Cold War.

== Reception ==
Miranda Sawyer in The Guardian reviewed a "funny, informative discussion.. genuinely interesting and fun" and described it as her "new favourite show". Sawyer later noted that "Puckrik and Fordyce are funny, but also excellent interviewers and this show, which incorporates war, philosophy, celebrity and political machinations, is far better than you would ever imagine." Sawyer later put the podcast in her top 10 of the year for 2021.

Billy Joel himself heard the show and appears as a special guest on an episode first broadcast on October 25, 2021.

== Episodes ==
Episode	Subject	Guest	Notes
1	Harry Truman	Eleanor Clift	
2	Doris Day	Tamar Jeffers-McDonald	
3	Red China	Yangwen Zheng	The Cultural Revolution was a sociopolitical movement in China from 1966 until Mao Zedong's death in 1976
4	Johnnie Ray	Cathi Unsworth	
5	South Pacific	Cara Rodway	A musical composed by Rodgers and Hammerstein
6	Walter Winchell	Chris Shoop-Worrall	
7	Joe DiMaggio	Josh Chetwynd	
8	Joe McCarthy	Josh Hollands	
9	Richard Nixon	Rivers Gambrell	Part 1 of 3 episodes on Nixon
10	Studebaker	Greg Diffen	Automobile manufacturer
11	Television	Dick Fiddy	"The Babysitter"
12	North Korea	Sojin Lim	
13	South Korea	Mary Lynn Bracht	
14	Marilyn Monroe	Shar Daws	Tie-in with sister podcast Death of a Film Star
15	Rosenbergs	Josh Hollands	Convicted of being Soviet spies
16	H-bomb	Margaret MacMillan	The first full-scale thermonuclear test was carried out by the United States in 1952
17	Sugar Ray	Steve Bunce	Sugar Ray Robinson was an American professional boxer who competed from 1940 to 1965
18	Panmunjom	Colin Thackery	The location where the 1953 Korean Armistice Agreement that paused the Korean War was signed
19	Brando	Jonathan Ross	Influential actor and activist Marlon Brando
20	The King and I	Cara Rodway	1951 musical by Rodgers and Hammerstein, made into film in 1956
21	The Catcher in the Rye	Caroline O'Donaghue	Novel by J.D. Salinger
22	Eisenhower	Rivers Gambrell	
23	Vaccine	Gareth Millward	The first effective polio vaccine was developed in 1952 by Jonas Salk and a team at the University of Pittsburgh
24	England's got a new Queen	Margaret MacMillan	Elizabeth II was crowned in June 1953
25	Marciano	Steve Bunce	Rocky Marciano was an American professional boxer who held the World Heavyweight title from 1952 to 1956
26	Liberace	Jo Kendall	
27	Santayana Goodbye	Matthew Flamm	George Santayana was a philosopher, poet, essayist and novelist
28	Joseph Stalin	Alex Halberstadt	
29	Malenkov	Natalya Chernyshova	Georgy Malenkov briefly succeeded Joseph Stalin as the leader of the Soviet Union
30	Nasser	Tarek Osman	Gamal Abdel Nasser led the Egyptian revolution of 1952, and was Egyptian president from 1954 to 1970
31	Prokofiev	Alexander Karpeyev	Russian composer, pianist and conductor
32	Rockefeller	Angie Maxwell	
33	Campanella	Josh Chetwynd	Roy Campanella (1921–1993), a former catcher and a member of the baseball Hall of Fame
34	Communist Bloc	Eric Halsey	With focus on life in communist Bulgaria
35	Roy Cohn	Matt Tyrnauer	Involved in the Army–McCarthy hearings in 1954
36	Juan Perón	Natalia Milanesio	
37	Toscanini	Harvey Sachs	Italian composer Arturo Toscanini (1967–1957)
38	Dacron	Cara Rodway	Polyethylene terephthalate, a polyester referred to by the brand names Terylene in the UK, Lavsan in Russia and the former Soviet Union, and Dacron in the US.
39	Dien Bien Phu falls	Dan Snow	The Battle of Dien Bien Phu was fought between March 13 and May 7, 1954.
40	Billy Joel	Billy Joel	
41	"Rock Around the Clock"	Peter Doggett	1954 hit record for Bill Haley & His Comets on Decca Records
42	Einstein	David Bodanis	Albert Einstein (March 14, 1879 – April 18, 1955) theoretical physicist
43	James Dean	Jake Lambert	
44	Brooklyn's got a winning team	Josh Chetwynd	1955 Baseball World Series winners the Brooklyn Dodgers
45	Davy Crockett	Dr. Amy Davis	
46	Peter Pan	Sarah Wolf	
47 and 48	Elvis Presley	Sally Hoedel	
49	Disneyland	Dr. Amy Davis	
50	Bardot	Caroline O'Donaghue	Brigitte Bardot, French actress born 1934
51	Budapest	Eric Halsey	Hungarian Revolution of 1956
52	Alabama	Chris Wilson	Bus boycott in Montgomery, Alabama in 1955, protesting racial segregation
53	Khrushchev	Dr. Natalya Chernyshova	Nikita Khrushchev (1894–1971) First Secretary of the Communist Party of the Soviet Union, 1953 to 1964
54	Princess Grace	Kate Williams	Grace Kelly (1929–1982) American actress.
55	Peyton Place	Dr. Cara Rodway	Novel and TV series
56	Trouble in the Suez	Tarek Osman	
57	Little Rock	Ryan Davis	
58	Pasternak	Ani Kokobobo	
59	Mickey Mantle	Josh Chetwynd	
60	Kerouac		
61	Sputnik	Dan Kendall	
62	Zhou Enlai	Yangwen Zheng	
63	Belgians in the Congo	David Van Reybrouck and Reine Nkambiote	This episode was recorded live at the DS podcast festival in Ostend and was republished on August 29, 2022 to maintain the lyric's order in the song.
64	Bridge on the River Kwai	Helen O’Hara	
65	Lebanon	Chloé Kattar	
66	Charles de Gaulle	Dr. Arthur Asseraf	
67	California baseball	Josh Chetwynd	
68	Starkweather Homicide	David Wilson	
69	Children of Thalidomide	Mikey Argy and C. Jean Grover	
70	Buddy Holly	Christopher Smith	
71	Ben-Hur	Helen O'Hara	
72	Space monkey	Dr. Stuart Clark	
73	Mafia	Jeff Nadu	
74	Hula hoops	Amy Hill	
75	Castro	Dr. Stephen Wilkinson	
76	Edsel is a no-go	Kit Chapman	
77	U-2	Francis Gary Powers, Jr.	
78	Syngman Rhee	Owen Miller	
79	Payola	Richard Carlin	
80	Kennedy	Fredrik Logevall	
81	Chubby Checker	Jack McCarthy	
82	Psycho	Cara Rodway	
83	Hemingway	Dr. Linda Patterson Miller	
84	Eichmann Part I	Steven Luckert	
85	Eichmann Part II	Ruth Barnett MBE	
86	Stranger in a Strange Land	Cara Rodway	
87	Dylan	Kerry Shale	
88	Berlin	Jane Peterson and Wolfgang Müller	Subjects of the short documentary Against the Wall
89	Bay of Pigs Invasion	Dr. Stephen Wilkinson	
90	Lawrence of Arabia	Helen O'Hara	
91 and 92	British Beatlemania	Mark Lewisohn	Counted as the 88th episode
93	Ole Miss	Charles K. Ross	
94	John Glenn	Dr. Kevin Fong	
95	Liston beats Patterson	Declan Taylor	
96	Pope Paul	James Felak	
97	Malcolm X	Dr. Peniel Joseph	
98	British politician sex	Kate Lister	
99	JFK blown away	none	
100	Birth control	Dr. Catherine Roach	
101	Ho Chi Minh	none	
102	Richard Nixon back again	David Greenberg	
103	Moonshot	Kit Chapman	Counted as 100th episode
104	Woodstock	Bob Spitz	
105	Watergate	Kurt Andersen	
106	Punk rock	Michael Hann	
107	Begin	Henry Abramson	
108	Reagan	none	
109	Palestine	Dr. Rashid Khalidi	
110	Terror on the airline	Brendan Koerner	
111	Ayatollahs in Iran	Ramita Navai	
112	Russians in Afghanistan	David Loyn	
113	Wheel of Fortune	Adam Nedeff	
114	Sally Ride	Sue Macy	
115	Heavy metal suicide	Michael Hann	
116	Foreign debt	Iwan Morgan	
117	Homeless vets	Stephen Eide	
118	AIDS	Deborah Gold	
119	Crack	Ruben Castaneda	
120	Bernie Goetz	none	
121	Hypodermics on the shore	Ruth Stringer	
122	China's under martial law	Jeff Wasserstrom	
123	Rock'n'roller Cola Wars	none	Series finale
