= Attila (rock band) =

American rock band

- Origin: New York City, U.S.
- Genres: Psychedelic rock; hard rock
- Years active: 1969–1970
- Label: Epic
- Spinoff of: The Hassles
- Past members: Billy Joel; Jon Small

Attila was an American rock duo from New York City, most notable for having featured a young Billy Joel.

== History ==
Billy Joel and Jon Small broke away from their band the Hassles and formed Attila in 1969. The instrumentation was organ and drums, with Joel also handling the bass lines with a keyboard, similar to the Doors' Ray Manzarek. Their creative partnership ended in 1970 when Joel ran off with Small's wife, Elizabeth, whom he later married, although this did not end their collaborations, as Small produced Joel's 1982 "Live From Long Island" video in addition to the 1990 "Live at Yankee Stadium" Video and the 2011 Live at Shea Stadium performance. Small became a music video director for artists such as Run DMC, Garth Brooks, Reba McEntire and Travis Tritt.

== Attila (album) ==
Attila

Studio album by Attila
- Released: July 27, 1970
- Genres: Acid rock; hard rock
- Length: 39:50
- Label: Epic
- Producers: Irwin Mazur; Billy Joel; Jonathan Small

Their only album, Attila, was released on July 27, 1970. No singles were released from the album and it did not chart. Joel himself has described the album as "psychedelic bullshit".

End of the sixties, I was in a two-man group. We were heavy metal, we were going to destroy the world with amplification, we had titles like "Godzilla", "March of the Huns", "Brain Invasion". A lot of people think [I] just came out of the piano bar ... I did a lot of heavy metal for a while. We had about a dozen gigs and nobody could stay in the room when we were playing. It was too loud. We drove people literally out of clubs. "It was great, but we can't stay in the club."

— Billy Joel, Interview with Billy Joel by Dan Neer in 1985

The track "Amplifier Fire, Part 1 (Godzilla)" later appeared on Joel's 2005 box set My Lives.

In 2025, two songs, "Wonder Woman" & "Holy Moses", from the Attila album would make their way onto the 2025 soundtrack for the Bioflick "And So It Goes".

=== Reception ===
Professional ratings
Review scores
Source	Rating
AllMusic	1/5 stars

Stephen Thomas Erlewine of AllMusic wrote that "Attila undoubtedly is the worst album released in the history of rock & roll—hell, the history of recorded music itself. There have been many bad ideas in rock, but none match the colossal stupidity of Attila."

Julian Cope described the album as "an extremely entertaining joke that Billy wasn't in on. But I've gotta say, I dug his trip, and the record still puts me in a good mood every time."

=== Track listing ===
All tracks written by Billy Joel and Jonathan Small.

Side one

1. "Wonder Woman" – 3:38
2. "California Flash" – 3:34
3. "Revenge Is Sweet" – 4:01
4. "Amplifier Fire" – 7:40
  - Part I – "Godzilla"
  - Part II – "March of the Huns"

Side two

1. "Rollin' Home" – 4:55
2. "Tear This Castle Down" – 5:49
3. "Holy Moses" – 4:30
4. "Brain Invasion" – 5:43

=== Personnel ===
- William Joel – vocals, keyboards, composer-arranger, production
- Jonathan Small – drums, composer-arranger, production
- Irwin Mazur – production
- Glenn Evans – road manager, technical (connected Hammond organ directly to Marshall amplifier)
