= You Got Me Hummin' =

Single by Sam & Dave
- B-side: "Sleep Good Tonight"
- Released: 1966
- Recorded: 1966
- Genre: Soul
- Label: Stax/Atlantic; S-204
- Songwriter(s): Isaac Hayes, David Porter
- Producer(s): Isaac Hayes; David Porter; Booker T. & the MG's

Sam & Dave singles chronology
"Said I Wasn't Tell Nobody" (1966)	"You Got Me Hummin'" (1966)	"When Something Is Wrong with My Baby" (1967)

"You Got Me Hummin'" (also known as "You've Got Me Hummin'") is a popular song written by Isaac Hayes and David Porter. It was first popularized by Sam & Dave, who had a Top 10 R&B hit with the song in 1966 on Stax Records. It was subsequently covered by Cold Blood who had greater success with the song on the American pop charts. Additionally, the song has been recorded by the Pointer Sisters, Reigning Sound, Freddie Fender and Delbert McClinton as well as J. Blackfoot. Billy Joel released the song several times: first in 1967, when in the band The Hassles and under the title "You've Got Me Hummin' and in 1983 (live version, on the B-side of the 12" of "Tell Her About It" under the title "You Got Me Hummin'".)

== Selected recording history ==
Artist or group	Pop	R&B
Sam & Dave	77	8
The Hassles	112	*
Cold Blood	52	*
J. Blackfoot	*	*
Freddie Fender and Delbert McClinton	*	*
The Pointer Sisters	*	*
Freddie McGregor	*	*

The Fun Fair 1968

== Charts ==
Chart (1967)	Peak position
US Billboard Hot 100	77
US Hot R&B/Hip-Hop Songs (Billboard)	7
