= The Hassles =

American psychedelic rock band

Background information
- Genres: Psychedelic rock; acid rock; blue-eyed soul
- Years active: 1964–1969
- Label: United Artists
- Past members: Richard McKenna; Jon Small; John Dizek; Harry Weber; Billy Joel; Howie Arthur Blauvelt

The Hassles were a rock group in the 1960s, most notable for recording the first releases to feature Billy Joel. The group released two full-length albums (on United Artists Records) and a number of singles.

== History ==
The original line-up of the group consisted of vocalist John Dizek (September 25, 1948 – June 27, 2017), guitarist Richard McKenna, drummer Jon Small, and organist Harry Weber. In 1966, Weber was fired from the band due to his excessive drug use (he was found dead a few years later on a railroad track) and was replaced by Howie Arthur Blauvelt and Billy Joel on bass and keyboards respectively. The band recorded their self-titled debut album in 1967. Blauvelt departed the band early in 1968 but returned later on in the year. Dizek left in late 1968 with Joel taking over vocals. The band released their second album, Hour of the Wolf, in 1969, before disbanding. After the demise of the Hassles, Joel and Small formed the duo Attila, while Blauvelt later co-founded Ram Jam. Joel later went on to a monumental solo career and Small became a video producer and director.

Dizek died after a long illness on June 27, 2017, at the age of 68. Small died from cancer on September 4, 2026, at the age of 79.

== Members ==
- Richard McKenna – guitars (1964–1969)
- Jon Small – drums (1964–1969; died 2026)
- John Dizek – vocals, harmonica, tambourine (1964–1968; died 2017)
- Harry Weber – bass, organ (1964–1966; died late 1960s)
- Billy Joel – keyboards, vocals (1966–1969)
- Howie Arthur Blauvelt – bass (1966–1968, 1968–1969; died 1993)

Additionally, Glenn Evans, John Abrant and Mike Cohen acted as road managers.

== Discography ==
=== Albums ===
==== The Hassles ====
Produced by Tony Michaels and Vinnie Gorman, the Hassles' eponymous debut album was released on November 21, 1967, and featured a number of cover versions of soul songs. The single "You've Got Me Hummin'" was number 112 for one week on the Bubbling Under the Hot 100 chart, their only Billboard chart appearance. In 1983, Billy Joel released a solo live recording of "You Got Me Hummin'" as a B-side to his hit "Tell Her About It" (available on the 12" maxi single, with the "special remixed version" of the A-side).

===== Track listing =====
1. "Warming Up" (William Joel) - 1:38
2. "Just Holding On" (Larry Weiss) - 2:06
3. "A Taste of Honey" (Ric Marlow, Bobby Scott) - 4:17
4. "Every Step I Take (Every Move I Make)" (William Joel, Tony Michaels, Vinny Gormann) - 2:30
5. "Coloured Rain" (Stevie Winwood, Jim Capaldi, Chris Wood), originally by Traffic - 3:22
6. "I Hear Voices" (Gene Boris Stashuk) - 2:53
7. "I Can Tell" (William Joel) - 2:57
8. "Giving Up" (Van McCoy) - 4:16
9. "Fever" (John Davenport, Eddie Cooley) - 3:19
10. "You've Got Me Hummin'" (Isaac Hayes, David Porter) - 2:27

===== 1992 re-issued CD with following bonus tracks =====
1. "I'm Thinkin'" - 2:05
2. "I'll Be Around" - 2:01
3. "When I Get Home" (John Lennon, Paul McCartney) - 4:23
4. "It's Not Enough" - 2:46
5. "Love Luck" - 3:21
6. "Look And You Will Find" - 2:58
7. "Blow My Mind" - 2:14
8. "Giving Up (Version #1)" - 4:08

==== Hour of the Wolf ====
Produced by Thomas Kay, the Hassles' second album was released on January 23, 1969. All songs on the album were original recordings written by Billy Joel, except where noted.

===== Track listing =====
1. "Country Boy" (W. Joel, J. Small) 2:35
2. "Night After Day" - 3:11
3. "Hour of the Wolf" (W. Joel, J. Dizek) - 11:58
4. "Four O'Clock in the Morning" - 3:12
5. "Cat" - 4:15
6. "Hotel St. George" - 5:00
7. "Land of Despair" (W. Joel, J. Small) - 3:36
8. "Further Than Heaven" (W. Joel, J. Dizek) - 7:16

=== Singles ===
- "Great Balls of Fire" (B-side "Travellin' Band') United Artists label (1969)

=== Compilations ===
- In 1992, the first album was released on CD with a number of bonus tracks. Plans were made to reissue Hour of the Wolf on CD with bonus tracks, although it is unreleased.
- In 1999, Razor & Tie re-released the Hassles' two albums as a "best of" collection on a single compact disc with "Hotel St. George" missing, but also with additional bonus tracks.
- In 2000, a low-quality re-release of Hour of the Wolf was released along with all tracks of Cold Spring Harbor as Billy Joel Sings.
- In 2004, the same Hour of the Wolf tracks from Billy Joel Sings were released separately as Billy Joel: The Early Years.
