= Until the Night =

Single by Billy Joel

from the album 52nd Street
- B-side: "Root Beer Rag"
- Released: March 1979
- Recorded: 1978
- Genre: Blue-eyed soul; soft rock
- Length: 6:35 (album version); 5:00 (single version)
- Label: Columbia
- Songwriter: Billy Joel
- Producer: Phil Ramone

Billy Joel UK singles chronology
"Honesty" (1979)	"Until the Night" (1979)	"All for Leyna" (1980)

"Until the Night" is a song written by Billy Joel for his 1978 album, 52nd Street. Although passed over for single release in the US, "Until the Night" was issued as the second single from 52nd Street in the UK - following "My Life" - in March 1979 and reached #50 on the UK Singles Chart.

Various versions of the single are in existence for different countries, with different B-sides including "Root Beer Rag", "Big Shot", and "Just the Way You Are" (all on CBS label). "Until the Night" is also included on the 2005 Billy Joel four-CD and one-DVD compilation My Lives.

== Music and lyrics ==
Music lecturer Ken Bielen described "Until the Night" as a "big ballad in the Righteous Brothers tradition. Joel biographer Mark Bego described it as a "dramatic sweeping ballad that sounds as if it is straight out of the Phil Spector songbook. According to Bego, the song was written as a tribute to the Righteous Brothers. The arrangement features many instruments, including strings, horns and castanets, that give it a sound reminiscent of the Righteous Brothers' 1960s hits. Richie Cannata contributes a jazzy saxophone solo in the middle of the song. Joel sings parts of the song in a higher voice and other parts in a deeper voice, and sometimes these two voices are double tracked, which also produces a sound reminiscent of the Righteous Brothers.

The lyrics describe a romance where the couple has to separate each morning so each can go to work. They are insecure about the relationship, but when they get back together in the evening everything is okay.

== Reception ==
Ultimate Classic Rock critic Dave Lifton rated "Until the Night" as Joel's 6th best love song, describing it as "an homage to the sweeping urban romanticism of Phil Spector's work with the Righteous Brothers." Pop culture historian Andrew Ross described "Until the Night" as a "schlock masterpiece." Rolling Stone critic Stephen Holden described "Until the Night" as "the formal piece de resistance of an album that, though far from great, boasts much of the color and excitement of a really good New York street fair." Billboard critic Melinda Newman called it an example of Joel "at his most tender and romantic." AllMusic critic Stephen Thomas Erlewine said that "Until the Night" is among Joel's best songs.

== Personnel ==
- Billy Joel – vocals, acoustic piano
- Richie Cannata – organ, saxophones, clarinet
- Steve Khan – electric guitar, acoustic guitar, backing vocals
- Hugh McCracken – nylon string guitar
- Doug Stegmeyer – bass, backing vocals
- Liberty DeVitto – drums
- David Freidman – orchestral chimes and percussion
- Robert Freedman – horn and string orchestration

== Cover versions ==
"Until the Night" was recorded by Czech singer Helena Vondráčková as "In der Nacht" for her 1979 album Doch in der Nacht, which comprised German-language renderings of Billy Joel songs. This version was issued as the album's single with "Ein Engel, der weiß, was er will" (originally "She's Always a Woman") as the B-side. Johnny Contardo of Sha Na Na covered the song on his 1980 solo album "Changeover." Bill Medley of the Righteous Brothers recorded "Until the Night" for his 1981 album Sweet Thunder. Charlie McCoy covered the song with Laney Smallwood in 1981. The single reached #92 on the Billboard Hot Country Songs chart.

== Chart positions ==
Chart (1979)	Peak position
UK Singles (OCC)	50
UK Airplay (Record Business)	34

== Sources ==
- 52nd Street copyright 1978, Sony Entertainment Inc.
- My Lives, copyright 2005, Sony BMG Music Entertainment.
