= Katie Puckrik =

American broadcaster and journalist (born 1962)

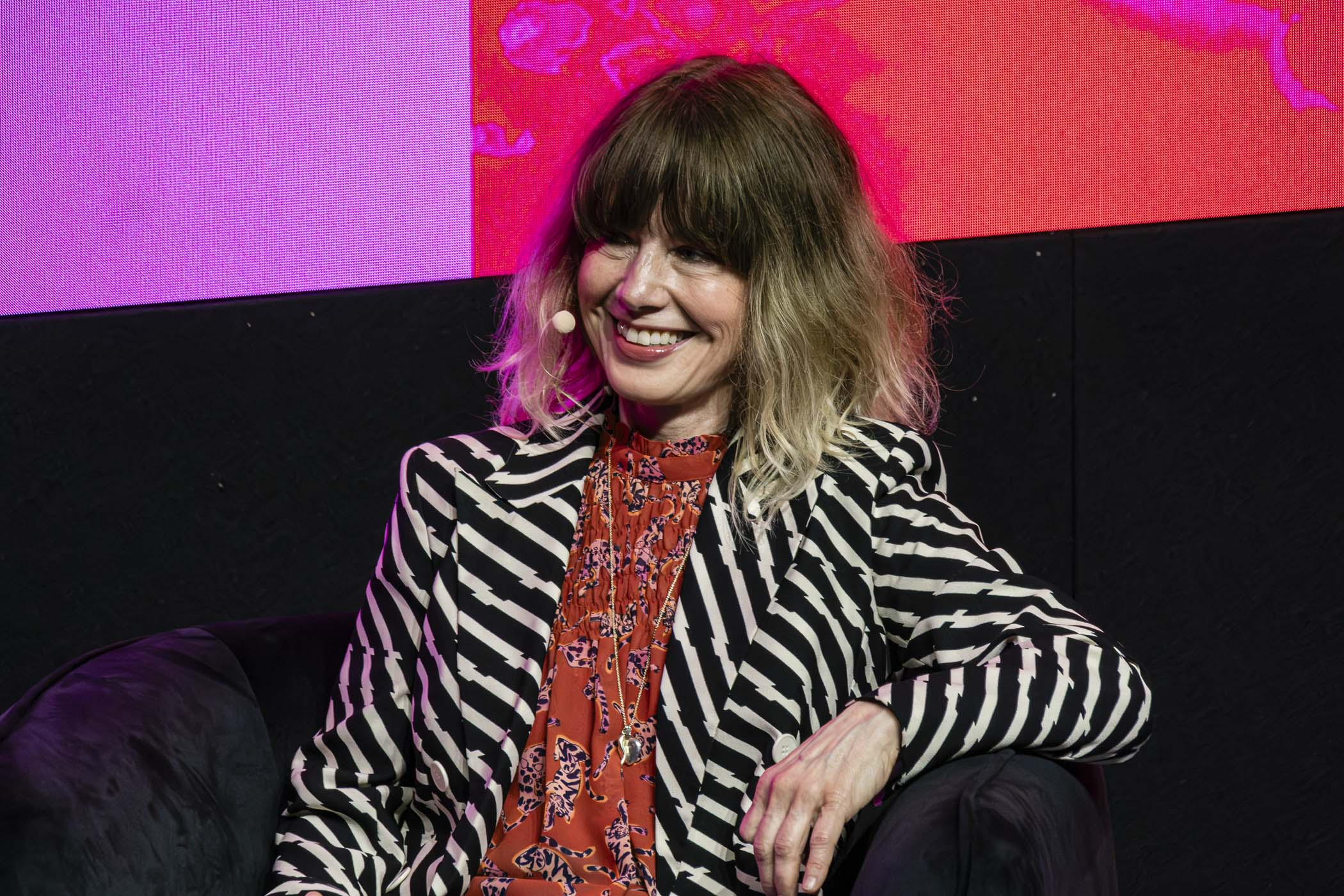
- Puckrik in 2025
- Born: 12 July 1962 (age 64); Virginia, U.S.
- Occupations: Broadcaster; columnist; dancer; singer

Katie Puckrik (born July 12, 1962) is an American broadcaster and newspaper columnist. Born in Virginia, Puckrik is best known for hosting British youth magazine shows The Word and The Sunday Show in the 1990s. She also created and hosted the British television talk show Pyjama Party and subsequently its American remake Pajama Party.

She runs a fragrance-themed YouTube series and blog called "Katie Puckrik Smells", writes a column for magazines and newspapers including The Guardian, and is a stand-in DJ on BBC Radio 6 Music, BBC Radio 2 and most recently Talkradio. She also co-hosts the history podcast We Didn't Start the Fire with Tom Fordyce.

== Biography ==
Born in Virginia, U.S., Puckrik moved to London, England in 1984. She worked as a dancer, including on Michael Clark's I Am Curious, Orange in 1988 and the Pet Shop Boys' 1991 Performance Tour. Following the end of this tour, she auditioned to become a presenter on Channel 4's late-night magazine show The Word, beating more than five thousand hopefuls for the job. She co-presented the show's second and third series from 1991 to 1993 alongside Dani Behr, Terry Christian and Mark Lamarr before moving on to present Channel 4's coverage of the Glastonbury Festival in 1994, 4 Goes to Glastonbury, alongside Mark Kermode.

In 1995 she moved to the BBC, contributing showbiz reports to Mark Radcliffe and Marc Riley's BBC Radio 1 show The Graveyard Shift, presenting the first two series of BBC Two's The Sunday Show with Donna McPhail, and fronting BBC Radio 5 Live's arts magazine Entertainment Superhighway, having previously presented Fashion Icons, a six-part series exploring fashion trends for BBC Radio 5 in February and March 1992. In 1996, Puckrik left the BBC to devise, produce and present Pyjama Party for ITV's post-primetime schedule. As part of a revamp of programming which saw the ITV Network form a uniform schedule through the night for the first time, Pyjama Party aired on Saturday evenings from January 1996. The Independent described the show as one in which "young women in frilly nightwear try to recreate their conspiratorial teenage years". In 1999, at the age of 37, she published an autobiography, Shooting from the Lip, in which the chapters were named after songs with personal significance.

In 2017, she presented a two-part radio series on power pop. In 2019, she presented a two-part BBC TV series on yacht rock, titled I Can Go For That: The Smooth World of Yacht Rock. It was accompanied by a three-part BBC radio series. Since January 2021, Puckrik has hosted the We Didn't Start the Fire podcast with Tom Fordyce explaining the subjects referenced in lyrics of the song "We Didn't Start the Fire" by Billy Joel. Another podcast series presented by Puckrik started in October 2021, dot com, exploring the people behind the internet.

== Bibliography ==
- Puckrik, Katie (1999). Shooting from the Lip. London: Headline. ISBN 0-7472-2204-5. (Autobiography)
