= And So It Goes =

Single by Billy Joel

from the album Storm Front
- Released: October 1990
- Studio: The Hit Factory and Times Square Studio, New York City
- Length: 3:38
- Label: Columbia
- Songwriter: Billy Joel
- Producers: Billy Joel; Mick Jones

Billy Joel singles chronology
"That's Not Her Style" (1990)	"And So It Goes" (1990)	"Shameless" (1991)

Music video
- "And So It Goes" on YouTube

"And So It Goes" is a song written by American singer-songwriter Billy Joel in 1983, but not released until its inclusion as the tenth and final track on his 1989 studio album Storm Front. The original 1983 demo was released on the 2005 box set My Lives. Joel wrote the song about his doomed relationship with model Elle Macpherson which began around 1983 (and only lasted a couple of months). They began dating after the divorce from his first wife, Elizabeth (div. 1982). Macpherson was about 19 years old in 1983, while Joel was around 34. Joel dated Macpherson for only a brief time, possibly up to 1984 or even 1985. During that time he also became involved with model Christie Brinkley, who would ultimately become his second wife in 1985.

The song was inspired by the Scottish ballad "Barbara Allen", and is unique for Joel as it is written in iambic tetrameter. In the original demo version of "And So It Goes", Joel sings the melody simply, accompanied by a simple piano backdrop, in a style very reminiscent of a hymn. On the 1989 album version, Joel sings and plays all the instrumentation (piano and synthesizers). The official video is from a live performance in front of a concert audience.

During the red carpet arrivals and interviews at the 66th Annual Grammy Awards in 2024, Laverne Cox on Live from E! asked Joel to name his definitive song and without hesitation Joel said, "And So It Goes".

The song gave a title to the 2025 documentary about Joel's life called Billy Joel: And So It Goes.

== Release ==
The single peaked at No. 37 on the U.S. Billboard Hot 100 and No. 5 on the U.S. Adult Contemporary chart in 1990. It has been covered by many subsequent artists. The King’s Singers and others have developed several vocal harmony arrangements of the song, which are often performed by high school and college choirs.

== Charts ==
Chart (1990–1991)	Peak position
Australia (ARIA)	108
Canada Top Singles (RPM)	30
Japan (Oricon)	12
US Billboard Hot 100	37
US Adult Contemporary (Billboard)	5
US Cash Box Top 100	37

== Certifications ==
Region	Certification	Certified units/sales
United States (RIAA)	Gold	500,000^{‡}
^{‡} Sales+streaming figures based on certification alone.
