= Susan Lacy (producer) =

American film director and producer

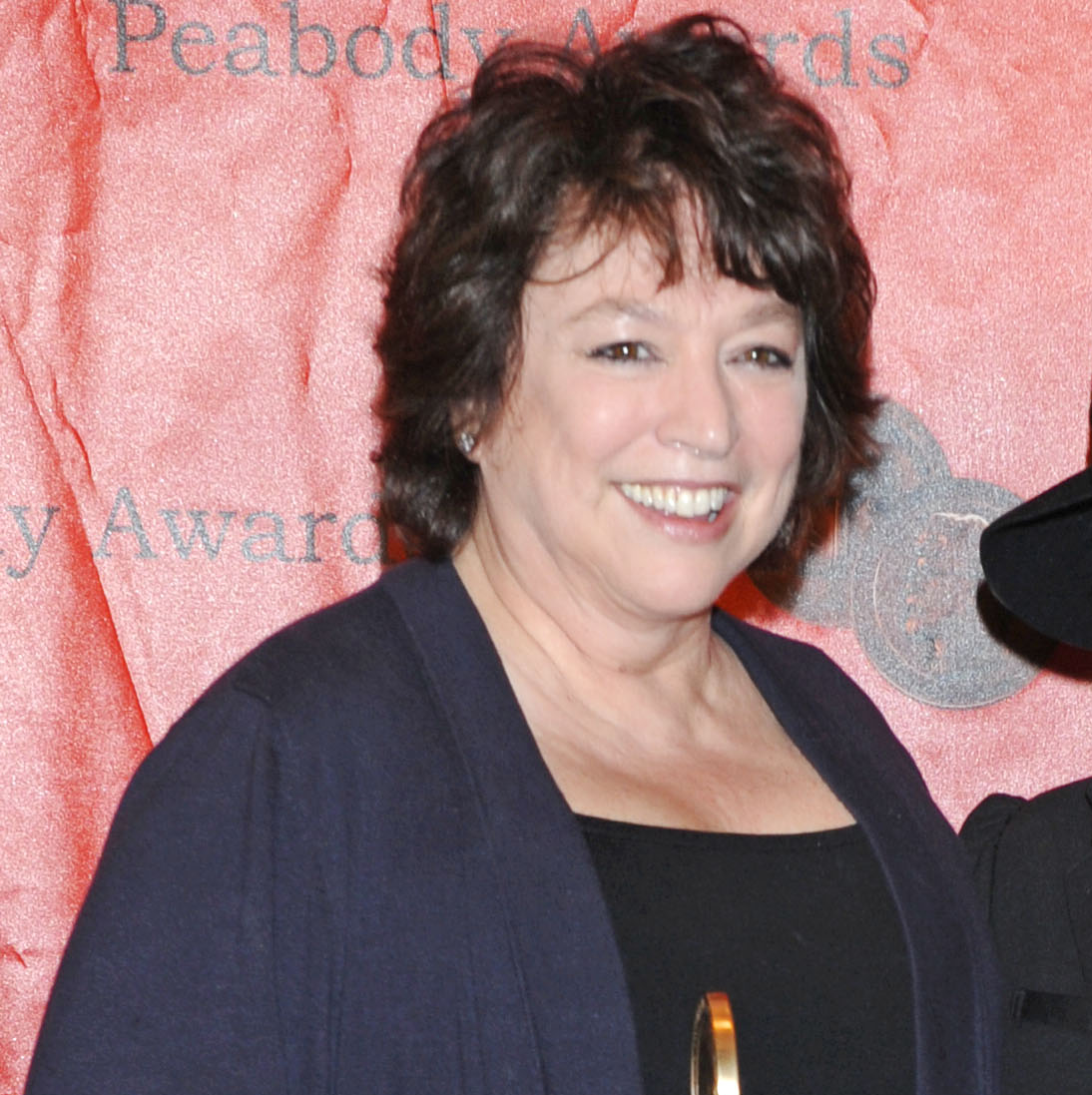
Lacy in 2011

Susan Lacy is an American film producer.

She is the creator and executive producer of the PBS documentary series American Masters.

In 2013, Lacy signed a multi-year to produce and direct documentaries for HBO.

In 2025 she co-directed and produced Billy Joel: And So It Goes, a two-part documentary film which explores the life and career of Billy Joel.
