= Tom Fordyce =

British sports journalist

- Education: Girton College, Cambridge
- Occupation: Journalist

Tom Fordyce is a British sports journalist and author. He wrote text commentaries on cricket and tennis, also writing features on various other sports and blogging from a number of different events.

Fordyce graduated from Girton College, Cambridge in 1992 with a degree in geography, and started his career as a features writer on Total Sport magazine and as a writer on the Sported magazine.

In 2007 he "blogged my way round the Rugby World Cup in a camper van" with BBC colleague Ben Dirs. He drove 4,500 miles around France whilst producing written and video diaries of the matches and interactions they had during the 44-day tournament. In 2008 he covered the Beijing Olympics on a number of different sports. His contributions for the Olympics also included experiments to observe how well he could run in the Beijing smog, and he also "road tested" the new Speedo swimsuit for "groinal roominess".

In June 2009 Fordyce published his first book, entitled We Could Be Heroes: One Van, Two Blokes and Twelve World Championships with Dirs, charting the madcap escapades that resulted from trying to become the world champion in something. Fordyce was the ghostwriter of Peter Crouch's book, How to Be a Footballer and Geraint Thomas's book, The World of Cycling According to G. He was co-host of That Peter Crouch Podcast, with Peter Crouch and Chris Stark. He is also co-host of the history podcast We Didn't Start the Fire with Katie Puckrik and the Joe Marler Show with rugby player Joe Marler.

In June 2020, Fordyce left his post as chief sports writer at the BBC to "take up an opportunity in podcasting".
