= We Didn't Start the Fire =

1989 single by Billy Joel

Single by Billy Joel

from the album Storm Front
- B-side: "House of Blue Light"
- Released: September 18, 1989
- Recorded: 1989
- Genre: Pop rock
- Length: 4:49 (album version); 4:29 (single version)
- Label: Columbia
- Songwriter: Billy Joel
- Producers: Mick Jones; Billy Joel

Billy Joel singles chronology
"Baby Grand" (1987)	"We Didn't Start the Fire" (1989)	"Leningrad" (1989)

Music video
- "We Didn't Start the Fire" on YouTube

"We Didn't Start the Fire" (1989)
"We Didn't Start the Fire" lists historical events in stream of consciousness. This particular sample describes the events from 1952 and 1953, as well as the first chorus.

"We Didn't Start the Fire" is a song written by American musician Billy Joel. The song was released as a single on September 18, 1989, and later released as part of Joel's album Storm Front on October 17, 1989. A list song, its fast-paced lyrics include a series of brief references to 119 significant political, cultural, scientific, and sporting events between 1949 (the year of Joel's birth) and 1989, in mainly chronological order.

The song was nominated for the Grammy Award for Record of the Year and, in late 1989, became Joel's third single to reach number one in the United States Billboard Hot 100. Storm Front became Joel's third album to reach number one in the US. "We Didn't Start the Fire", particularly in the 21st century, has become the basis of many pop culture parodies, and continues to be repurposed in various television shows, advertisements, and comedic productions. Despite its early success, Joel later noted his dislike of the song musically. In a 1993 interview, Joel compared the song to "a dentist drill" and called it "a terrible piece of music". It has been critically panned as one of his worst by later generations of music critics.

== History ==
Joel conceived the idea for the song when he had just turned 40. He was in a recording studio and met a 21-year-old friend of Sean Lennon who said "It's a terrible time to be 21!" Joel replied: "Yeah, I remember when I was 21 – I thought it was an awful time and we had Vietnam, and y'know, drug problems, and civil rights problems and everything seemed to be awful." The friend replied: "Yeah, yeah, yeah, but it's different for you. You were a kid in the fifties and everybody knows that nothing happened in the fifties." Joel retorted: "Wait a minute, didn't you hear of the Korean War or the Suez Canal Crisis?" Joel later said those headlines formed the basic framework for the song.

Joel later criticized the song on strictly musical grounds. In 1993, when discussing it with documentary filmmaker David Horn, Joel compared its melodic content unfavorably to his song "The Longest Time": "Take a song like 'We Didn't Start the Fire'. It's really not much of a song ... If you take the melody by itself, terrible. Like a dentist drill." It is also the only song in Joel's discography where he wrote the lyrics before the music.

When asked if he deliberately intended to chronicle the Cold War with his song he responded: "It was just my luck that the Soviet Union decided to close down shop [soon after putting out the song]", and that this span "had a symmetry to it, it was 40 years" that he had lived through. He was asked if he could do a follow-up about the next couple of years after the events that transpired in the original song, and he commented: "No, I wrote one song already and I don't think it was really that good to begin with, melodically".

== Critical reception ==
Upon its release, "We Didn't Start the Fire" was met with a mixed response. David Giles from Music Week wrote, "Promising return which finds Joel in rockier mood with a very wordy song cramming in references to virtually every major figure and event in the twentieth century. After all that, the message of the lyrics is foggy and confused, but this should certainly see him back in the charts."

Though the lyrics are rapid-fire with several people and events mentioned in each stanza, there is widespread agreement on the meaning of the lyrics. Steven Ettinger wrote:

Billy Joel captured the major images, events, and personalities of this half-century in a three-minute song ... It was pure information overload, a song that assumed we knew exactly what he was singing about ... What was truly alarming was the realization that we, the listeners, for the most part understood the references.

After a cover by Fall Out Boy was released in 2023 to negative critical reception, the song was once again brought to the forefront, and modern critics panned even the original song as one of Joel's worst in his entire catalog. In June 2026, CBS News included the song in its list of the 250 essential American songs of the past 250 years.

== Music video ==
External videos
- Billy Joel – We Didn't Start the Fire (Official Video), 04:05
- Billy Joel – We Didn't Start The Fire (Official Video, Extended) 04:26

A music video for the song was directed by Chris Blum. The video begins with a newly married couple entering their 1940s-style kitchen, and shows events in their domestic life over the next four decades, including the addition and growth of their children and grandchildren, the 1950s housewife burning dinner, a distraught 1960s housewife whose disinterested husband and children won't eat her cooking, popping pills, the hippie counterculture children burning their bras and draft cards while smoking marijuana in the kitchen, and the eventual death of the family's father. The passage of time is also depicted by periodic redecoration and upgrades of the kitchen, while an unchanging Billy Joel looks on in the background. Joel is also shown banging on a table in front of a burning backdrop depicting various images that include the execution of Nguyễn Văn Lém and the assassination of Lee Harvey Oswald, among others.

== Personnel ==
- Billy Joel – vocals, clavinet, percussion
- Liberty DeVitto – drums, percussion
- David Brown – lead guitar
- Joey Hunting – rhythm guitar
- Crystal Taliefero – backing vocals, percussion
- Schuyler Deale – bass guitar
- John Mahoney – keyboards
- Sammy Merendino – electronic percussion
- Kevin Jones – keyboard programming
- Doug Kleeger – sounds effects and arrangements

== Charts ==
=== Weekly charts ===
Weekly chart performance for "We Didn't Start the Fire"
Chart (1989–1990)	Peak position
Australia (ARIA)	2
Austria (Ö3 Austria Top 40)	7
Belgium (Ultratop 50 Flanders)	6
Canada Top Singles (RPM)	2
Canada Adult Contemporary (RPM)	9
Europe (European Hot 100 Singles)	21
Ireland (IRMA)	3
Israel (IBA)	1
Japan (Oricon)	11
Netherlands (Dutch Top 40)	11
Netherlands (Single Top 100)	11
New Zealand (Recorded Music NZ)	5
Switzerland Airplay (Schweizer Hitparade)	3
UK Singles (Official Charts)	7
UK Airplay (Music & Media)	1
US Billboard Hot 100	1
US Adult Contemporary (Billboard)	5
US Mainstream Rock (Billboard)	6
West Germany (GfK)	4

Chart (2019–2023)	Peak position
US Rock Digital Song Sales (Billboard)	17
US Rock Streaming Songs (Billboard)	18

=== Year-end charts ===
1989 year-end chart performance for "We Didn't Start the Fire"
Chart (1989)	Position
Australia (ARIA)	37
Belgium (Ultratop)	65
Canada Top Singles (RPM)	77
UK Singles (OCC)	53

1990 year-end chart performance for "We Didn't Start the Fire"
Chart (1990)	Position
Canada Top Singles (RPM)	50
Germany (Media Control)	31
US Billboard Hot 100	35

== Certifications ==
Certifications and sales for "We Didn't Start the Fire"
Region	Certification	Certified units/sales
Australia (ARIA)	Platinum	70,000^{^}
Canada (Music Canada)	Gold	50,000^{^}
Denmark (IFPI Danmark)	Gold	45,000^{‡}
Germany (BVMI)	Gold	300,000^{‡}
New Zealand (RMNZ)	3× Platinum	90,000^{‡}
United Kingdom (BPI)	2× Platinum	1,200,000^{‡}
United States (RIAA)	6× Platinum	6,000,000^{‡}
^{^} Shipments figures based on certification alone.^{‡} Sales+streaming figures based on certification alone.

== Release history ==
Release dates and formats for "We Didn't Start the Fire"
Region	Date	Format(s)	Label(s)	Ref.
United Kingdom	September 18, 1989	7-inch vinyl; 12-inch vinyl; CD	CBS	
United Kingdom	September 25, 1989	Cassette	CBS	
Japan	November 9, 1989	Mini-CD	CBS/Sony	

== Events and people outlined ==
The following events and individual's names, with Joel's lyric for each appearing in bold, are listed in the order that they appear in the song, which is almost entirely chronological. The lyrics for each item are minimal, and the items are punctuated by the chorus and other lyrical elements. The following list includes longer, more descriptive names for clarity. Events and names from a variety of contexts – such as popular entertainment, foreign affairs, and sports – are intermingled, giving an impression of the culture of the time as a whole. There are 118 items listed in the song.

=== 1940s ===
==== 1949 ====
- **Harry Truman** is inaugurated after he wins the 1948 United States presidential election following a partial term after the death of Franklin D. Roosevelt.
- **Doris Day** releases her debut album You're My Thrill, and stars in two hit movies, My Dream is Yours and It's a Great Feeling.
- **Red China** is established by the Chinese Communist Party, which wins the Chinese Civil War.
- **Johnnie Ray**, a rock and roll progenitor, signs his first recording contract with Okeh Records.
- **South Pacific**, the award-winning musical, opens on Broadway.
- **Walter Winchell,** an influential radio and newspaper journalist, begins to denounce communism as the main threat facing America.
- **Joe DiMaggio** signs a record-breaking $100,000 contract with the New York Yankees.

=== 1950s ===
==== 1950 ====
- **Joe McCarthy**, a U.S. Senator, gains national attention and begins his anti-communism crusade with his Lincoln Day speech.
- **Richard Nixon** is first elected to the United States Senate.
- **Studebaker**, a popular automobile company, begins its financial downfall.
- **Television** becomes widespread throughout Europe and North America.
- **North Korea** invades **South Korea**, beginning the Korean War.
- **Marilyn Monroe** appears in five films, including The Asphalt Jungle and All About Eve.

==== 1951 ====
- The **Rosenbergs**, married couple Ethel and Julius, are convicted of espionage.
- **H-Bomb** development begins in the United States.
- **Sugar Ray** Robinson, a champion boxer, defeats Jake LaMotta in the "St. Valentine's Day Massacre".
- **Panmunjom**, a border village in Korea, is the location of truce talks between the parties of the Korean War.
- Marlon **Brando** is nominated for the Academy Award for Best Actor for his role in A Streetcar Named Desire.
- **The King and I**, the musical by Rodgers and Hammerstein, opens on Broadway.
- **The Catcher in the Rye**, a controversial novel by J. D. Salinger, is published.

==== 1952 ====
- Dwight D. **Eisenhower** is the landslide winner of the 1952 United States presidential election.
- **Vaccine** for polio is successfully developed by Jonas Salk.
- England's got a new queen: Princess Elizabeth succeeds to the throne as Queen Elizabeth II and is crowned the following year.
- Rocky **Marciano** defeats Jersey Joe Walcott, becoming the world heavyweight boxing champion.
- **Liberace** first broadcasts The Liberace Show.
- George **Santayana**, philosopher, essayist, poet and novelist, dies.

==== 1953 ====
- **Joseph Stalin**, leader of the Soviet Union, dies.
- Georgy **Malenkov** succeeds Stalin for six months.
- Gamal Abdel **Nasser** acts as the true power behind the new Egyptian nation as Muhammad Naguib's minister of the interior.
- Sergei **Prokofiev**, a popular Russian composer, dies.
- Winthrop **Rockefeller** had a highly publicized divorce in 1953, but Nelson Rockefeller and John D. Rockefeller III also made headlines that year. Billy Joel himself has stated that Nelson Rockefeller was meant, in particular for his fame as governor of New York state. However, Nelson was governor from 1959 to 1973, whereas all other items in this verse happened in 1953.
- Roy **Campanella**, a baseball catcher for the Brooklyn Dodgers, receives the National League's Most Valuable Player award for the second time.
- Communist Bloc: The East German uprising of 1953 is crushed by the Volkspolizei and the Group of Soviet Forces in Germany.

==== 1954 ====
- **Roy Cohn** resigns as Joseph McCarthy's chief counsel and enters private practice.
- **Juan Perón** is at the height of his power as President of Argentina before a coup the following year.
- Arturo **Toscanini** is at the height of his fame as a conductor, performing regularly with the NBC Symphony Orchestra on U.S. national radio.
- **Dacron** is an early artificial fiber made from the same plastic as polyester.
- **Dien Bien Phu falls** to Việt Minh forces, leading to the creation of North Vietnam and South Vietnam as separate states.
- **"Rock Around the Clock"** is a hit single released by Bill Haley & His Comets.

==== 1955 ====
- Albert **Einstein** dies at the age of 76.
- **James Dean** achieves success with East of Eden and Rebel Without a Cause, but dies in a car accident at the age of 24.
- Brooklyn's got a winning team: The Brooklyn Dodgers win their first and only World Series before their move to Los Angeles.
- Davy Crockett: King of the Wild Frontier, An edited compilation of the titular miniseries by Disney is released about the legendary frontiersman Davy Crockett.
- **Peter Pan**, recently featured in a Disney animated feature, is also the subject of a stage musical starring Mary Martin, broadcast on NBC live and in color. It made history as the first Broadway musical, with the same cast and crew, to be turned into a TV movie.
- **Elvis Presley** signs with RCA Records, going on to earn a reputation as the "King of Rock and Roll".
- **Disneyland** opens as Walt Disney's first theme park.

==== 1956 ====
- Brigitte **Bardot** stars in And God Created Woman, the film that establishes her international reputation as a French "sex kitten".
- **Budapest**, is the site of the Hungarian Revolution.
- **Alabama** is the site of the Montgomery bus boycott, one of the pivotal events in the civil rights movement.
- Nikita **Khrushchev** makes his famous Secret Speech denouncing Stalin's "cult of personality".
- **Princess Grace** Kelly appears in her last film High Society and marries Prince Rainier III of Monaco.
- **Peyton Place**, the best-selling socially scandalous novel by Grace Metalious, is published.
- Trouble in the Suez: Crisis intensifies after Egypt nationalizes the Suez Canal.

==== 1957 ====
- **Little Rock**, Arkansas, is the site of a standoff between Governor Orval Faubus and President Eisenhower over the Little Rock Nine attending a previously whites-only high school.
- Boris **Pasternak**, the Russian author, publishes his novel Doctor Zhivago.
- **Mickey Mantle** is in the middle of his career as a famous New York Yankees outfielder and American League All-Star for the sixth year in a row.
- Jack **Kerouac** publishes his novel On the Road, a defining work of the Beat Generation.
- **Sputnik** becomes the first artificial satellite, launched by the Soviet Union, marking the start of the space race.
- **Zhou Enlai**, Premier of the People's Republic of China, survives an assassination attempt.
- The **Bridge on the River Kwai** is released, and receives seven Academy Awards, including Best Picture.

==== 1958 ====
- **Lebanon** is engulfed in a political and religious crisis that eventually involves U.S. intervention.
- **Charles de Gaulle** is elected first president of the French Fifth Republic following the Algerian Crisis.
- **California baseball** begins as the Brooklyn Dodgers and New York Giants move, respectively, to Los Angeles and San Francisco.
- Starkweather homicide: Charles Starkweather killed eleven people, mostly in Lincoln, Nebraska.
- Children of Thalidomide: Many pregnant women taking the drug Thalidomide had children born with congenital birth defects.

==== 1959 ====
- **Buddy Holly** dies in a plane crash with Ritchie Valens and The Big Bopper. Joel prefaces the lyric with a Holly signature vocal hiccup: "Uh-huh, uh-huh."
- **Ben-Hur**, starring Charlton Heston, wins eleven Academy Awards, including Best Picture.
- Space Monkey: A rhesus macaque and a squirrel monkey become the first two animals to be launched by NASA into space and survive.
- **Mafia** leaders are convicted in the Apalachin meeting trial, confirming it as a nationwide conspiracy.
- **Hula hoops** sales reach 100 million in just two years as the latest toy fad.
- Fidel **Castro** comes to power after a revolution in Cuba.
- Edsel is a no-go: Production of this much-advertised car marque ends after only three years due to poor sales.

=== 1960s ===
==== 1960 ====
- A **U-2** spy plane flown by American CIA pilot Francis Gary Powers was shot down over the Soviet Union, causing the 1960 U-2 incident. It does not refer to the Irish rock band U2 which did not form until 1976.
- **Syngman Rhee** is rescued by the CIA after being forced to resign as leader of South Korea.
- **Payola**, illegal payments for radio broadcasting of songs, are publicized by Dick Clark's testimony before Congress and Alan Freed's public disgrace.
- John F. **Kennedy**, a U.S. senator from Massachusetts, beats Vice President Richard Nixon in the 1960 U.S. presidential election.
- **Chubby Checker** popularizes the dance The Twist with his cover of the song of the same name.
- **Psycho**, an Alfred Hitchcock thriller, becomes a landmark in graphic violence and cinema sensationalism. The screeching violins heard at this point in the song are a trademark of the film's soundtrack.
- Belgians in the Congo: The Republic of the Congo (Léopoldville) was declared independent of Belgium.

==== 1961 ====
- Ernest **Hemingway** dies by suicide after a long battle with depression.
- Adolf **Eichmann**, a "most wanted" Nazi war criminal, is convicted in Israel for crimes against humanity during World War II.
- **Stranger in a Strange Land**, written by Robert A. Heinlein, is a breakthrough best-seller with themes of sexual freedom and liberation.
- Bob **Dylan** (then known as Robert Zimmerman) is signed to Columbia Records after a New York Times review by critic Robert Shelton.
- **Berlin**'s separation into West Berlin and East Berlin is cemented when the Berlin Wall is erected.
- The **Bay of Pigs Invasion**, an attempt by United States-trained Cuban exiles to invade Cuba and overthrow Fidel Castro, fails.

==== 1962 ====
- **Lawrence of Arabia**, an Academy Award-winning film starring Peter O'Toole, premiered.
- **British Beatlemania** starts as The Beatles become one of the world's most popular rock bands.
- Ole Miss: Southern segregationists rioted over the enrollment of black student James Meredith at the University of Mississippi.
- **John Glenn** flew the first American-crewed orbital mission termed "Friendship 7".
- Sonny **Liston** knocks out and **beats** the rarely defeated Floyd **Patterson** in the first round of the world heavyweight boxing championship.

==== 1963 ====
- **Pope Paul** VI becomes pope when Cardinal Giovanni Montini is elected to the title.
- **Malcolm X** incites controversy, including his statement that "the chickens have come home to roost" about John F. Kennedy's assassination.
- **British politician sex** scandal: British Secretary of State for War John Profumo has a scandalous sexual relationship with showgirl Christine Keeler.
- JFK blown away: US President John F. Kennedy is assassinated in Dallas, Texas.

==== 1965 ====
- Birth control: Griswold v. Connecticut challenges a Connecticut law prohibiting contraceptives.
- Ho Chi Minh: In opposition to North Vietnamese president Ho Chi Minh, the United States deploys troops in South Vietnam.

==== 1968 ====
- Richard Nixon back again: After losing to Kennedy in 1960, former Vice President Nixon is elected president in 1968.

==== 1969 ====
- Moonshot: Apollo 11 involves the first human landing on the Moon by astronauts Neil Armstrong, Buzz Aldrin and Michael Collins
- **Woodstock** music festival attracts 400,000, as a touchstone of the counterculture of the 1960s.

=== 1970s ===
==== 1972–1975 ====
- Watergate: The Republican burglary of the Democratic National Committee's headquarters at the Watergate office complex leads to the resignation of President Nixon.
- **Punk rock** is birthed with the formation of bands such as the Ramones and the Sex Pistols.

==== 1976–1977 ====
- Menachem **Begin** becomes Prime Minister of Israel and negotiates the Camp David Accords with Egypt's president.
- Ronald **Reagan**, former governor of California, begins his US presidential campaign in 1976, and is elected in 1980.
- Palestine: The ongoing Israeli–Palestinian conflict escalates as Israelis establish settlements in the West Bank.
- Terror on the airline: Numerous aircraft hijackings take place, including an Air France flight diverted to Uganda, where the plane was stormed in Operation Entebbe.

==== 1979 ====
- The **Ayatollah** restored to leadership in Iran: The Iranian Revolution replaces secular Shah Mohammad Reza Pahlavi with Islamic rule by Ayatollahs led by former exile Ruhollah Khomeini.
- **Russians in**vade **Afghanistan**: The Soviet Union deploys its army into Afghanistan, beginning a decade-long war.

=== 1980s ===
==== 1981–1982 ====
- **Wheel of Fortune**, an American television game show that had debuted in 1975, becomes widely popular after hiring new hosts Pat Sajak and Vanna White.

==== 1983 ====
- **Sally Ride** becomes the first American woman in space by flying aboard Challenger on the STS-7 shuttle mission.

==== 1984 ====
- Heavy metal suicide: A 19-year-old man commits suicide after listening to "Suicide Solution" and the family files a lawsuit against Ozzy Osbourne.
- Foreign debts: Persistent trade and budget deficits lead to numerous countries defaulting on their debts.
- Homeless vets: Veterans of the Vietnam War, including many disabled in the service, are becoming homeless and impoverished.
- AIDS: The immunodeficiency disease caused by HIV emerges as a pandemic.
- **Crack** cocaine became a widely used form of the drug in impoverished inner cities.
- **Bernie Goetz** shoots four young black men who were trying to mug him on a New York City subway train, and is acquitted of charges.

==== 1987–1988 ====
- Hypodermics on the shores: Medical waste was found washed up on the beaches of Long Island, New Jersey, and Connecticut after being illegally dumped at sea.

==== 1989 ====
- China under martial law: China declares martial law, resulting in the use of military forces against protesting students to end the Tiananmen protests.
- **Rock and roller** sponsored cola wars: Soft drink giants Coke and Pepsi each run marketing campaigns using rock & roll and popular music stars, including Michael Jackson and Whitney Houston.

== Parodies and popular culture ==
=== Derivations ===
Many parodies and takeoffs have been based on the song (often expanding to events that have occurred since 1989). These parodies include The Simpsons' parody "They'll Never Stop the Simpsons" at the end of the 2002 "Gump Roast" episode, and the San Francisco a cappella group The Richter Scales' 2007 Webby Award-winning parody "Here Comes Another Bubble".

On May 17, 1990, the Irish rock band the Memories reached number one on the Irish Singles Chart with their version of the song entitled "The Game (Italia '90)" which celebrated Republic of Ireland's qualification for the 1990 FIFA World Cup in Italy. Billy Joel partially covered the Memories version when he performed in Dublin.

In 2004, Boris Novković and Dino Dvornik released a song "Malo Nas Je, Al' Nas Ima" ("We Are Few, But We Exist"), listing Croatian VIPs and events.

In 2006, Coca-Cola sampled the song to make a Latin American anthem for the German 2006 FIFA World Cup. The lyrics were changed for each country.

In 2007, JibJab released an installment of their then-annual "Year in Review" videos, which was set to the tune of "We Didn't Start the Fire".

In 2012, the political-satire music group Capitol Steps released "We Didn't Start Satire", a review of 30 years of political events and scandals.

In 2013, YouTuber Dane Boedigheimer, known as the creator of the popular comedic web series Annoying Orange, produced a parody as part of YouTube's Comedy Week titled "We Didn't Start the Viral", although the video's audio was later replaced for copyright infringement despite being considered fair use as a work of parody.

In June 2013, pop band Milo Greene performed a version of the song for The A.V. Club's A.V. Undercover series.

Since the 2015–16 season, YouTuber Jim Daly produced a parody of this song at the start of every English football season, outlining all 92 clubs in the Premier League and English Football League of each season. There are notable lines such as those about the Bristol derby (e.g. "Bristol City, Bristol Rovers, They will never like each other" from the 2026–27 version), "What's the point of Crawley", lines questioning "Alexandra" from Crewe Alexandra's name, "Where the hell is Fleetwood", "Do not call the Forest Notts" for Notts County, and saying that Tinie Tempah hasn't seen Scunthorpe United.

In 2019, talk show host Jimmy Fallon performed a version of the song for The Tonight Show, which highlights characters and moments in the Marvel Cinematic Universe since Iron Man, leading to Avengers: Endgame, with backup by cast members Robert Downey Jr., Chris Hemsworth, Chris Evans, Jeremy Renner, Don Cheadle, Mark Ruffalo, Paul Rudd, Danai Gurira, Karen Gillan and Brie Larson.

On June 28, 2023, Fall Out Boy released their own version of the song with updated lyrics that reference events that happened from 1989 to 2023. Unlike Joel's original, Fall Out Boy's version did not list events in chronological order. On September 12, 2023, the band performed it at the 2023 MTV Video Music Awards. The song was widely panned by fans and critics, especially for its lack of chronological sequencing present in Joel's original and its omission of some events and people, particularly the COVID-19 pandemic. Fall Out Boy bassist and lead songwriter, Pete Wentz, said in an interview regarding the exclusion: "It's like, that's all anybody talked… You know what I mean? I don't know. It felt like there was a couple of things that felt like a little on the nose. And then there were a couple of things where it was like … Bush v. Gore, we needed the rhyme."

Also in 2023, WIXX FM disk jockeys Corey Carter and Huggie penned and aired “Wisconsin Started the Fire”, which reinterpreted the lyrics to focus on Wisconsin-specific history and culture. Lyrics included references to Screech (portrayed by Wisconsinite Dustin Diamond), the Green Bay Packers, the sagging of the Leo Frigo Memorial Bridge, and Spotted Cow.

=== In popular culture ===
In 2021, a weekly podcast began, hosted by Katie Puckrik and Tom Fordyce, entitled We Didn't Start the Fire. Each week they examine a subject mentioned in the Billy Joel song, in lyric order, and discuss its importance and cultural significance with an expert guest.

The song features prominently, along with a number of other Billy Joel songs, in the streaming series The Boys from Amazon Prime in which the character Hughie Campbell, played by Jack Quaid, has a preoccupation with the American singer.

The plot of the season 17 premiere of It's Always Sunny in Philadelphia, "The Gang F***s Up Abbott Elementary", involves the characters writing an updated version of "We Didn't Start the Fire", without being aware that Fall Out Boy did it first.

== See also ==
- "We Didn't Start the Fire" – an updated version by Fall Out Boy
- "Dearie" – a song consisting of nostalgic references to the first half of the 20th century
- "Do You Remember These" – a song covering the 1950s
- "Life Is a Rock (But the Radio Rolled Me)" – a song by Norman Dolph and Paul DiFranco, recorded by Reunion
- "Pencil Thin Mustache" – a song by Jimmy Buffett
- "19 Somethin'" – a song covering the 1970s and 1980s
- 25 Years of Rock – a BBC radio series looking at each year from 1955 to 1979 that charted news stories, social and political events with a rock soundtrack
- The Rock 'n' Roll Years – a BBC television series based on 25 Years of Rock but with a timespan from 1956 to 1989

== Bibliography ==
- Bordowitz, Hank (2006). Billy Joel: The Life & Times of an Angry Young Man. Billboard Books. p. 272. ISBN 978-0-8230-8248-3.
