= That's Not Her Style =

Single by Billy Joel

from the album Storm Front
- B-side: "And So It Goes"
- Released: July 1990
- Genre: Rock
- Length: 5:10 (album version); 4:09 (single version)
- Label: Columbia
- Songwriter: Billy Joel
- Producer: Mick Jones

Billy Joel singles chronology
| "The Downeaster 'Alexa'" (1990) | "That's Not Her Style" (1990) | "And So It Goes" (1990) |

Music video
- "That's Not Her Style" on YouTube

"That's Not Her Style" is a song by American singer-songwriter Billy Joel, released in July 1990 as the fifth single from his eleventh album, Storm Front (1989), as well as the opening track on the album. It was written for Joel's then-wife Christie Brinkley. The song was the lowest-charting single from the album, failing to crack the top 70 in the United States. The song's music video features a live performance of the song at Yankee Stadium. A 4-track EP was also released.

== Personnel ==
- Billy Joel – lead and backing vocals, acoustic piano
- Jeff Jacobs – synthesizers, backing vocals
- David Brown – guitars
- Schuyler Deale – bass
- Liberty DeVitto – drums
- Don Brooks – harmonica
- Patricia Darcy Jones – backing vocals
- Frank Floyd – backing vocals
- Mick Jones – backing vocals
- Richard Marx – backing vocals
- Brian Ruggles – backing vocals
- Crystal Taliefero – backing vocals

== Charts ==
| Chart (1990) | Peak position |
|---|---|
| Japan (Oricon) | 9 |
| UK Singles (Official Charts) | 97 |
| US Billboard Hot 100 | 77 |
| US Mainstream Rock Airplay (Billboard) | 18 |
| US Cash Box Top 100 | 52 |
