= Billy Joel: And So It Goes =

2025 American TV documentary series

- Directed by: Susan Lacy; Jessica Levin
- Country of origin: United States
- Original language: English
- No. of episodes: 2

Production
- Executive producers: Nancy Abraham; Steve Cohen; Gary Goetzman; Tom Hanks; Sean Hayes; Lisa Heller
- Producer: Emma Pildes
- Running time: 288 minutes
- Production companies: Hazy Mills Productions; Pentimento Productions; Playtone

Original release
- Network: HBO
- Release: July 18 – July 25, 2025

Billy Joel: And So It Goes is a 2025 American documentary directed by Susan Lacy and Jessica Levin based on the life and career of musician Billy Joel. Produced in two parts for HBO, first aired July 18, then July 25, 2025, the film takes its title from Joel's song "And So It Goes".

== Premise ==
Billy Joel: And So It Goes is an expansive portrait of Billy Joel that explores the life and work of the singer-songwriter and the impact of his music.

== Production ==
In March 2025, HBO announced that it would be airing a two-part documentary about Joel's life and music and the meaning behind his songwriting.

The documentary features a diverse cast of interviewees, including members of Joel's family (Alexa Ray Joel, Alexander Joel), ex-wives (Christie Brinkley, Katie Lee), musical luminaries (Bruce Springsteen, Paul McCartney, Pink, Nas, Garth Brooks, Jackson Browne, and Itzhak Perlman) and friends.

The documentary also features the first interview in 40 years with Joel’s first wife, Elizabeth Weber, who helped launch his career, and was his manager until they parted ways in 1982.

== Episodes ==
No.	Title	Directed by	Original release date
1	"Part One"	Susan Lacy and Jessica Levin	July 18, 2025
Billy Joel admits to being a work in progress as he heads towards his eighth decade and looks back on a childhood as the son of working-class parents on Long Island, the loss he felt at the age of eight when his father left the home, and his entry into the business of music. Acknowledging the mistakes he made along the way, Joel put everything he lived through into his music. As he went from keyboard player in local bands to striking out on his own, he discusses the love affair and first marriage with Elizabeth Weber that became the fuel for his early songwriting hits, such as “Just the Way You Are” and “She's Always a Woman.” His collaborators and peers thoughtfully illuminate his musical gifts, and Joel delves into the business deal he made that led to the writing of “Piano Man.” After signing with Columbia Records, Joel’s career took off and years of hits and record-breaking tours followed, as he continued to channel his personal experiences into his music. While he chafed against the critical response to his music, struggled with his relationship to alcohol, and navigated a complicated personal life, a near fatal motorcycle accident impacted his ability to play piano and left his future unclear. How would he rebuild his career and move forward with his life.
2	"Part Two"	Susan Lacy and Jessica Levin	July 25, 2025
With his eighth studio album The Nylon Curtain, Joel changed his musical focus by reflecting the grit and aspirations of the Everyman with songs such as “Allentown” and “Goodnight Saigon.” Joel recounts his complicated reunion with his long-absent father and discovers the secret story of how his Jewish grandparents survived Nazi Germany, which he distilled into his philosophical ballad “Vienna.” Recovering from years on the road, Joel vacations in St. Barths where he meets his future wife, supermodel Christie Brinkley, who would become the mother of his first child and the inspiration behind the hit “Uptown Girl.” Dedicated to his craft, but uneasy with fame and the spotlight, Joel persevered through romantic and professional setbacks, choosing to reinvent himself time and time again. With the support of his wife Alexis Roderick Joel and their children, and through his collaboration with Elton John, a return to his classical roots and his historic residency at Madison Square Garden, he continues to find a safe space in his music.

== Release ==
It had its world premiere on June 4, 2025, at the 2025 Tribeca Festival. Joel was not in attendance, as a week prior, he had been diagnosed with a brain disorder Normal Pressure Hydrocephalus (NPH), which also led him to cancel upcoming concerts.

== Reception ==
The review aggregator website Rotten Tomatoes reported a 95% approval rating based on 21 critic reviews. The website's critical consensus states, "An expansive portrait of the life and music of Billy Joel, exploring the love, loss, and personal struggles that fuel his songwriting; intimately exploring the life and work of Joel, whose music has endured across generations." Metacritic, which uses a weighted average, gave a score of 72 out of 100 based on 8 critics, indicating "generally favorable acclaim."

== Media ==
On July 26, 2025, Joel released a 155-track companion album, that coincided with the release of the documentary. The album mirrors the tracks from the film which features well known hits, alternative versions, live renditions, as well as unreleased recordings, unreleased studio sessions, and new mixes.
