= Storm Front (album) =

Studio album by Billy Joel
- Released: October 17, 1989
- Recorded: 1988–1989
- Studios: The Hit Factory (New York City); Right Track Recording (New York City); The Warehouse Studio (Vancouver); The Power Station (New York City)
- Genres: Art rock; arena rock; hard rock; new wave
- Length: 44:34
- Label: Columbia
- Producers: Mick Jones; Billy Joel

Billy Joel chronology
Kohuept (1987)	Storm Front (1989)	Souvenir (1990)

Singles from Storm Front
- 1. "We Didn't Start the Fire" Released: September 1989; 2. "Leningrad" Released: December 1989 (UK); 3. "I Go to Extremes" Released: January 1990; 4. "The Downeaster 'Alexa'" Released: May 1990; 5. "That's Not Her Style" Released: July 1990; 6. "And So It Goes" Released: October 1990; 7. "Shameless" Released: January 1991

Professional ratings
Review scores
Source	Rating
AllMusic	2.5/5 stars
Deseret News	(Positive)
Los Angeles Times	3/5 stars
New Musical Express	5/10
The New York Times	(Positive)
People	(Not favorable)
Rolling Stone	4/5 stars
The Village Voice	B

Storm Front is the eleventh studio album by American singer-songwriter Billy Joel, released on October 17, 1989. The album was produced by Mick Jones of the band Foreigner, who was recommended to Joel by Eddie Van Halen after Jones had produced Van Halen's 1986 album 5150. It was Joel's third album to reach No. 1 in the U.S. and features "We Didn't Start the Fire", a fast-paced song that cataloged a list of historical events, trends, and cultural icons from 1949 (when Joel was born) until 1989.

== Background ==
Storm Front marked a radical change in Joel's backing band. Since his last studio album, The Bridge, rhythm guitarist Russell Javors, bassist Doug Stegmeyer, and keyboardist Dave Lebolt, long-time members of Joel's band, had been dismissed; Javors was replaced by Joey Hunting during recording and Tommy Byrnes for the live tour, Stegmeyer by Schuyler Deale, and Lebolt by Jeff Jacobs while drummer Liberty DeVitto, lead guitarist David Brown, and saxophonist Mark Rivera were retained. Joel also hired percussionist and multi-instrumentalist Crystal Taliefero, who would go on to become a permanent member of the band.

The album's cover depicts the maritime storm warning flag indicating wind forces 10–12, the highest intensity on the Beaufort scale.

In recent SiriusXM interviews, Joel has stated that he was inspired by Peter Gabriel's 1986 track "Sledgehammer" for the "driving rhythm section" when he was writing the title track.

The song "And So It Goes" was written and first recorded in 1983. The original demo was released on the box set compilation My Lives in 2005. Joel wrote the song about his doomed relationship with model Elle Macpherson which began around 1983. The song gave a title to the 2025 documentary about Joel's life called Billy Joel: And So It Goes.

== Chart performance ==
"I Go to Extremes", a song describing the ups and downs of his emotional life, placed at No. 6 on the US Billboard Hot 100. Other songs that placed in the top 100 were "And So It Goes" (No. 37), "The Downeaster 'Alexa'" (No. 57), and "That's Not Her Style" (No. 77). The album was also nominated for five Grammy Awards.

== Notable cover versions ==
In 1991, Garth Brooks recorded "Shameless" on his album Ropin' the Wind. Brooks' cover version was also released as a single and reached the top of the US country charts, and also entered the UK Singles Chart.

In 2023, Fall Out Boy released an updated version of "We Didn't Start the Fire" to include the years up to 2023. Upon its release, it received negative critical reception, including modern critics who even panned the original song as one of Joel's worst in his entire catalog.

== Track listing ==
All tracks are written by Billy Joel.

Side one
No.	Title	Length
1.	"That's Not Her Style"	5:10
2.	"We Didn't Start the Fire"	4:50
3.	"The Downeaster 'Alexa'"	3:44
4.	"I Go to Extremes"	4:23
5.	"Shameless"	4:26

Side two
No.	Title	Length
6.	"Storm Front"	5:17
7.	"Leningrad"	4:06
8.	"State of Grace"	4:30
9.	"When in Rome"	4:44
10.	"And So It Goes"	3:38
Total length:		44:34

== Personnel ==
=== Musicians ===
- Billy Joel – vocals, piano (1, 4, 7, 8, 10), clavinet (2, 3, 6), percussion (2), accordion (3), Hammond organ (4, 6, 8, 9), harpsichord (5), synthesizers (10)
- Jeff Jacobs – synthesizers (1–9), backing vocals (1), horn arrangements (6)
- John Mahoney – keyboards (2), keyboard programming (7)
- Kevin Jones – keyboard programming (2)
- Doug Kleeger – sounds effects (2), arrangements (2)
- David Brown – guitars (1–9), MIDI guitar solo (6)
- Joey Hunting – rhythm guitar (2)
- Mick Jones – guitars (6), guitar solo (8), backing vocals (1, 4, 8)
- Schuyler Deale – bass (1–9)
- Liberty DeVitto – drums (1–9), percussion (2)
- Crystal Taliefero – percussion (2), backing vocals (1, 2, 5, 6, 9)
- Sammy Merendino – electronic percussion (2)
- Don Brooks – harmonica (1)
- Dominic Cortese – accordion (3, 7)
- Itzhak Perlman – violin (3)
- Lenny Pickett – saxophone (6, 9)
- Andrew Love – saxophone (6)
- Wayne Jackson – trumpet, trombone (6)
- Richard Marx – backing vocals (1, 6)
- Patti Darcy – backing vocals (1, 5, 6, 9)
- Frank Floyd – backing vocals (1, 5, 6)
- Brian Ruggles – backing vocals (1)
- Joe Lynn Turner – backing vocals (4, 8)
- Ian Lloyd – backing vocals (4, 8)
- Chuck Arnold – backing vocals (7), choral leader (7)
- Hicksville High School Chorus – backing vocals (7)
- Brenda White-King – backing vocals (9)
- Curtis King – backing vocals (9)
- Bill Zampino – choral arrangement (7)
- Arif Mardin – orchestral arrangement (7)

=== Technical ===
- Produced by Mick Jones and Billy Joel
- Production coordinator – Jim Miner
- Engineered by Jay Healy
- Assistant engineers – David Dorn, Tim Crich, Joe Pirrera, Dana Becker, Gary Solomon, and Suzanne Hollander
- Mixed by Tom Lord-Alge (1–3) and Jay Healy (3–10)
- Mastered by Ted Jensen at Sterling Sound (New York, NY)
- Art direction – Chris Austopchuk
- Front photography – Frank Ockenfels
- Back photography – Timothy White

== Accolades ==
=== Grammy Awards ===
Year	Nominee / work	Award	Result
1990	"We Didn't Start the Fire"	Song of the Year	Nominated
1990	"We Didn't Start the Fire"	Record of the Year	Nominated
1990	"We Didn't Start the Fire"	Best Pop Vocal Performance, Male	Nominated
1991	Storm Front	Best Pop Vocal Performance, Male	Nominated
1991	Storm Front (produced by Billy Joel and Mick Jones)	Producer of the Year (Non-Classical)	Nominated

== Charts ==
=== Weekly charts ===
Chart (1989–1990)	Peak position
Australian Albums (ARIA)	1
Austrian Albums (Ö3 Austria Top 40)	10
Canadian Albums (RPM)	4
Dutch Albums (MegaCharts)	14
Finnish Albums (Suomen virallinen lista)	33
German Albums (Media Control)	5
Icelandic Albums (Tónlist)	9
Japanese Albums (Oricon)	8
New Zealand Albums (RIANZ)	9
Swiss Albums (Schweizer Hitparade)	30
UK Albums (OCC)	5
US Billboard 200	1
Zimbabwean Albums (ZIMA)	4

=== Year-end charts ===
Chart (1989)	Position
Australian Albums Chart	41
UK Albums Chart	73
Chart (1990)	Position
Canadian Albums Chart	29
Dutch Albums Chart	67
German Albums Chart	4
US Billboard Year-end	10

== Certifications and sales ==
Region	Certification	Certified units/sales
Australia (ARIA)	2× Platinum	140,000^{^}
Austria (IFPI Austria)	Gold	25,000^{*}
Canada (Music Canada)	2× Platinum	200,000^{^}
Germany (BVMI)	Platinum	500,000^{^}
Japan (RIAJ)	Platinum	110,000
Netherlands (NVPI)	Gold	50,000^{^}
New Zealand (RMNZ)	Gold	7,500^{^}
United Kingdom (BPI)	Platinum	300,000^{^}
United States (RIAA)	4× Platinum	4,000,000^{^}
^{*} Sales figures based on certification alone.^{^} Shipments figures based on certification alone.
