= Leningrad (song) =

1989 single by Billy Joel

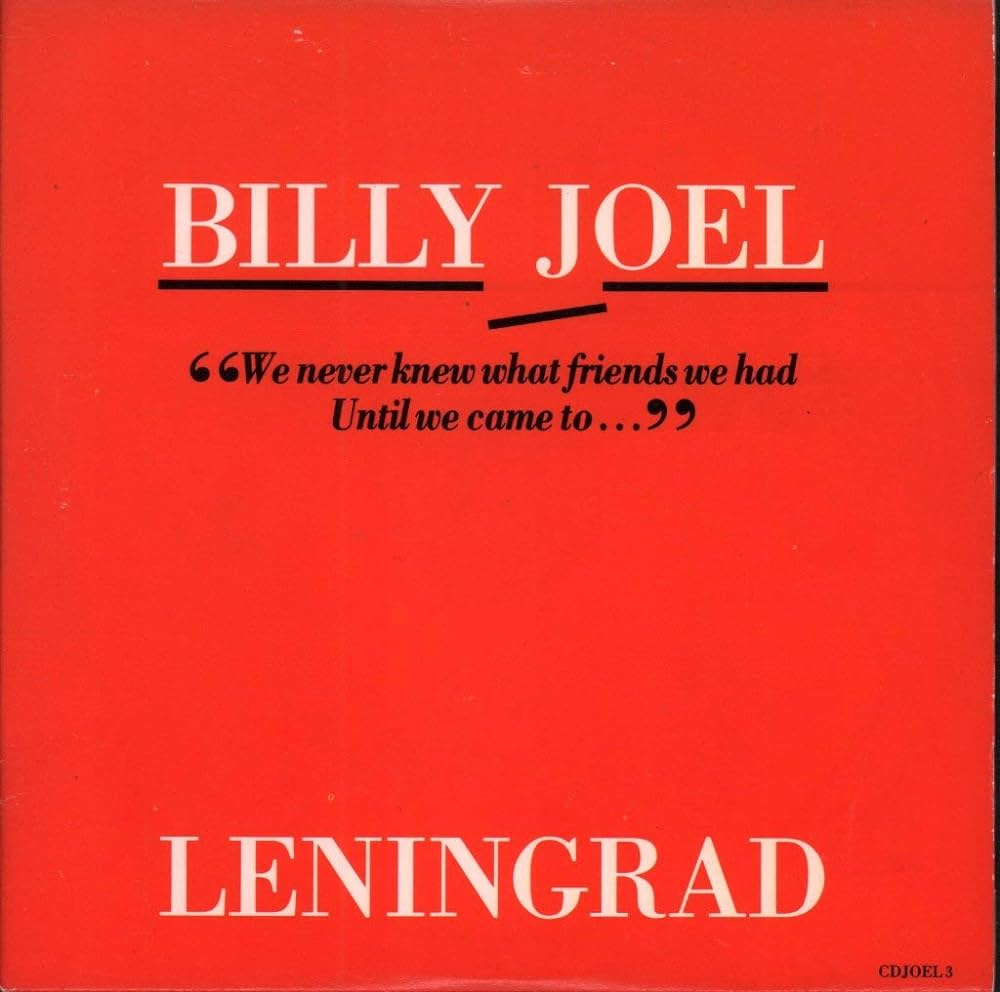

Single by Billy Joel

from the album Storm Front
- B-side: "Goodnight Saigon"; "Vienna"; "Scandinavian Skies"
- Released: 1989
- Length: 4:06
- Label: Columbia
- Songwriter: Billy Joel
- Producers: Billy Joel; Mick Jones

Billy Joel singles chronology
"We Didn't Start the Fire" (1989)	"Leningrad" (1989)	"I Go to Extremes" (1989)

Music video
- "Leningrad" on YouTube

"Leningrad" is a song written and performed by American singer-songwriter Billy Joel from his album Storm Front (1989), released as a single in Europe only. The song title is derived from the contemporary name of St. Petersburg, Russia. It was included on his Greatest Hits Vol. 3 compilation in 1997.

== Synopsis ==
The song was written by Joel about the Russian clown Viktor Razinov, whom he met while touring the Soviet Union in 1987. Throughout the song, major events in Razinov and Joel's lives are compared to show the cultural differences and similarities of the United States and the Soviet Union.

In the song, Joel describes Viktor's life as one of many Soviet children who lost fathers during World War II, specifically during the siege of Leningrad. The lyric tells of how he enlisted in the Red Army, drank vodka to fight the pain, and then became a circus clown, bringing joy to Russian children.

Joel described his childhood life as being "born in '49, a Cold War kid in McCarthy time". He briefly describes his life living near Levittown, and the fear of the Cuban Missile Crisis. Joel also makes a reference to the Korean War, a proxy war to the Cold War, as well as the Vietnam War.

The two met after Joel's 1987 Leningrad concert (Viktor had journeyed across the Russian Soviet Federative Socialist Republic to see all six of the Russian concerts). In the song's last line, Joel sings: "We never knew what friends we had, until we came to Leningrad." The quote is printed on the single cover, but not on the cover of the 4-track CD, which instead features the titles of the extra songs: "Goodnight Saigon", "Vienna", and "Scandinavian Skies".

In 2015, Razinov traveled to New York City to see Billy Joel's concert in Madison Square Garden. For this reunion, Joel played "Leningrad", which he rarely plays live.

The backing vocals were sung by members of the Hicksville High School Choir where Joel had previously been a student. The students were selected by the school's choir director, Chuck Arnold, who wrote the harmonies.. Arnold was later singled out at a sold-out Denver, CO, show on August 8, 2019.

== Critical reception ==
Upon release of the single, Melody Maker reviewer Mick Mercer branded the artist "Not a Boring Bastard Anymore" and called the song an "understated ballad, with one great line" about Cold War kids.

== Charts ==
=== Weekly charts ===
Chart (1989–1990)	Peak position
Belgium (Ultratop 50 Flanders)	17
Europe (Eurochart Hot 100)	68
Netherlands (Dutch Top 40)	15
Netherlands (Single Top 100)	15
UK Singles (Official Charts)	53
West Germany (GfK)	14

=== Year-end charts ===
Chart (1990)	Position
Germany (Media Control)	66

== See also ==
- List of anti-war songs
