= Shameless (Billy Joel song) =

1991 single by Billy Joel

Single by Billy Joel

from the album Storm Front
- B-side: "Stormfront" (live)
- Released: January 1991
- Recorded: 1988–89
- Genre: Rock
- Length: 4:26
- Label: Columbia
- Songwriter: Billy Joel
- Producer: Mick Jones

Billy Joel singles chronology
"And So It Goes" (1990)	"Shameless" (1991)	"All Shook Up" (1992)

"Shameless"

Single by Garth Brooks

from the album Ropin' the Wind
- B-side: "The Dance"/"Rodeo"/"The Thunder Rolls"
- Released: October 21, 1991
- Studio: Jack's Tracks (Nashville, Tennessee)
- Genre: Country
- Length: 4:20
- Label: Liberty
- Songwriter: Billy Joel
- Producer: Allen Reynolds

Garth Brooks singles chronology
"Rodeo" (1991)	"Shameless" (1991)	"What She's Doing Now" (1991)

"Shameless" is a song written by American singer Billy Joel and recorded on his 1989 album Storm Front. His version peaked at No. 40 on the Hot Adult Contemporary Tracks chart. Two years later, the song was covered by country music artist Garth Brooks on his third studio album, 1991's Ropin' the Wind. Brooks' rendering of the song was his seventh No. 1 hit on the Billboard country charts in late 1991. It also reached No. 71 on the UK Singles Chart. In 1992, professional wrestler Tim Horner also covered the song on the March 3 episode of Smoky Mountain Wrestling to critical acclaim from producer Rick Rubin.

In 1993, on stage in Boston, Joel introduced the song by saying, "I want[ed] to write a song, like a Jimi Hendrix song, you know. Back in the sixties, he was one of my idols, Jimi Hendrix." Joel also mentioned the Hendrix inspiration at a talk in Nuremberg, in 1995.

== Background and production ==
=== Garth Brooks version ===
The song features harmony vocals by Trisha Yearwood, Brooks's later wife. Brooks provided the following background information on the song in the booklet liner notes from his compilation, The Hits:

"Shameless" was the longest shot we took with a song. I was talked into becoming a member of a CD club...you know, the 40,000 CD's for a penny deal. With those clubs, they write you with the selection of the month. If you don't write back and cancel, then they send it to you and charge you for it. I was on the road for six months with no one to check the mail and came home to find six compact discs in my mailbox. Storm Front by Billy Joel was one of them. I hadn't listened to Billy Joel since the late seventies, probably since Glass Houses. I fell in love with the album and fell back in love with Billy Joel's music. One of his songs really captured me, a song called "Shameless." I kept watching it, and when he did not release it as a single, we contacted his people in the hopes that we could cut it. His people sent us a letter acknowledging that he knew who I was and was very honored that I was cutting it. That was quite a compliment for me then, as it is now. My hope is that Billy, as writer, hears this cut and says, "Yeah, man, the guy's got balls."

Brooks performed "Shameless" with Joel during Joel's Last Play at Shea concerts in 2008, and after Brooks performed it in his Central Park concert in 1997, Joel came out on stage and they sang a duet of "New York State of Mind." In 2011, Joel and Brooks performed the song together again when Brooks was inducted to the Songwriters Hall of Fame by Joel.

== Critical reception ==
=== Garth Brooks version ===
Stephen Thomas Erlewine of Allmusic described Brooks' rendering of the song favorably in his review of the album, saying that Brooks "made his '70s rock influences more explicit" by "transform[ing] the song from a rock power ballad into contemporary country."

== Chart positions ==
=== Billy Joel version ===
Chart (1992)	Peak position
Australia (ARIA)	133
US Adult Contemporary (Billboard)	40

=== Garth Brooks version ===
Chart (1991)	Peak position
Australia (ARIA)	103
Canada Adult Contemporary (RPM)	23
Canada Country Singles (RPM)	1
Dutch Singles Chart	43
UK Singles Chart	71
US Hot Country Songs (Billboard)	1

"Shameless" entered the Billboard Hot Country Singles chart on October 19, 1991.

=== Year-end charts ===
Chart (1991)	Position
Canada Country Tracks (RPM)	38
