= The Downeaster "Alexa" =

"The Downeaster 'Alexa'"

Single by Billy Joel

from the album Storm Front
- B-side: "And So It Goes"
- Released: May 1990
- Studio: The Hit Factory, Times Square Studio, New York, NY
- Genre: Rock
- Length: 3:44
- Label: Columbia
- Songwriter: Billy Joel
- Producers: Billy Joel; Mick Jones

Billy Joel singles chronology
"I Go to Extremes" (1990)	"The Downeaster 'Alexa'" (1990)	"That's Not Her Style" (1990)

Music video
- "The Downeaster "Alexa"" on YouTube

"The Downeaster 'Alexa'" is a song by American singer-songwriter Billy Joel from his eleventh studio album, Storm Front (1989), released as the album's fourth single. It peaked at No. 57 on the US Billboard Hot 100 and was included on Joel's Greatest Hits Vol. 3 album in 1997. The song was named for his boat, which in turn was named after his daughter Alexa Ray Joel.

The violin solo is played by virtuoso Itzhak Perlman. The music video for the song was directed by Andy Morahan.

== Content ==
The song is sung in the persona of an impoverished fisherman off Long Island and the surrounding waters who, like many of his fellow fishermen, is finding it increasingly hard to make ends meet and keep ownership of his boat, a powered vessel built in the Down Easter style.

== Charts ==
Chart (1990)	Peak position
Australian Singles Chart	126
Canadian Singles Chart	25
Japanese Singles Chart (Oricon)	6
UK Singles Chart	76
US Billboard Hot 100	57
US Hot Adult Contemporary Tracks (Billboard)	18
US Mainstream Rock Tracks (Billboard)	33
US Cash Box Top 100	61

== Certifications ==
Region	Certification	Certified units/sales
United States (RIAA)	Gold	500,000^{‡}
^{‡} Sales+streaming figures based on certification alone.
