= I Go to Extremes =

1989 single by Billy Joel

Single by Billy Joel

from the album Storm Front
- B-side: "When in Rome"
- Released: January 1990
- Genre: Rock
- Length: 4:23
- Label: Columbia
- Songwriter: Billy Joel
- Producers: Mick Jones; Billy Joel

Billy Joel singles chronology
"Leningrad" (1989)	"I Go to Extremes" (1990)	"The Downeaster 'Alexa'" (1990)

Music video
- "I Go to Extremes" on YouTube

"I Go to Extremes" is a song by American singer-songwriter Billy Joel from his eleventh studio album, Storm Front (1989), released as the album's second US single in early 1990. It reached the number-six position on the US Billboard Hot 100 and peaked at number three on the Canadian RPM 100 Hit Tracks chart. The song was also a top-10 hit on both the Billboard Adult Contemporary and Album Rock Tracks charts. The song also reached at number 70 on the UK Singles Chart.

At one point considered a song about a manic-depressive, the song was originally written as an apology to Joel's wife at the time, Christie Brinkley. The B-side to the single was "When In Rome", which appeared on the same album. The music video consists of Joel and his backing band playing the song in a room. The song received mostly positive response, and a live version appears on the album 2000 Years: The Millennium Concert. During live performances, Joel would often jokingly change the lyrics to the chorus, as well as to various lines in the song.

== Writing and recording ==
The St. Paul Pioneer Press believes that the song chronicles the highs and lows of a "manic-depressive". However, according to Joel, the song is an apology that is directed to his then wife, Christie Brinkley. Joel was apologizing for his erratic personality. In live concerts, Joel would often jokingly create new lyrics for the chorus, such as "I go for ice cream". The song is believed to be about Joel's own lifestyle. The B-side to the single release was another song from the album, "When in Rome". The music video consists of Joel playing with musicians in a room.

== Reception ==
Dennis Hunt of The Los Angeles Times believed the song was the highlight of the album, saying that it was the only song that wasn't "tainted by a social message". The Fresno Bee sarcastically says "Oh, Billy, stop it – you're just soooo extreme! Have your machine call my machine, and we'll do this extreme thing together." The Pittsburgh Post-Gazette said of the song, "I realized a lot of rock critics must have tin ears. Why else would they pan Billy Joel?" Jan DeKnock of The Chicago Tribune believed that the song was "another sure-fire winner from his [Joel's] 'Storm Front' LP". Robb Frederick of The Daily Collegian believed that the song "shows remorse for a moodiness which almost reaches the degree of schizophrenia". John MCalley of Rolling Stone called the song "hard-driving", and thought the character in the song was "futilely [trying] to account to his girlfriend for his inconsistent moods and wavering confidence". The Miami Herald believed that the song had potential to be a "great" song, but was still disappointed. Stephen Thomas Erlewine of Allmusic believed that the song was one of the strongest songs of the album, also calling it "catchy". Matthew Bernstein of The Boston Globe believes that it's a great work-out song.

== Personnel ==
- Billy Joel – lead and backing vocals, acoustic piano, Hammond organ
- Jeff Jacobs – synthesizers
- David Brown – guitars
- Schuyler Deale – bass
- Liberty DeVitto – drums
- Mick Jones – backing vocals
- Ian Lloyd – backing vocals
- Joe Lynn Turner – backing vocals

== Charts ==
=== Weekly charts ===
Chart (1990)	Peak position
Australia (ARIA)	48
Canada Top Singles (RPM)	3
Canada Adult Contemporary (RPM)	2
Ireland (IRMA)	29
Israel (IBA)	17
Italy Airplay (Music & Media)	8
Netherlands (Single Top 100)	43
New Zealand (Recorded Music NZ)	45
UK Singles (Official Charts)	70
UK Airplay (Music & Media)	9
US Billboard Hot 100	6
US Adult Contemporary (Billboard)	4
US Mainstream Rock Airplay (Billboard)	10
US Cash Box Top 100	6
West Germany (GfK)	36

=== Year-end charts ===
Chart (1990)	Position
Canada Top Singles (RPM)	25
Canada Adult Contemporary (RPM)	29
US Billboard Hot 100	82
US Adult Contemporary (Billboard)	39

== Release history ==
Region	Date	Format(s)	Label(s)	Ref.
United States	January 1990	7-inch vinyl; cassette	Columbia	
Japan	January 21, 1990	Mini-CD	CBS/Sony	
United Kingdom	February 19, 1990	7-inch vinyl; 12-inch vinyl; CD	CBS	
