= Crystal Taliefero =

American multi-instrumentalist and vocalist (born 1963)

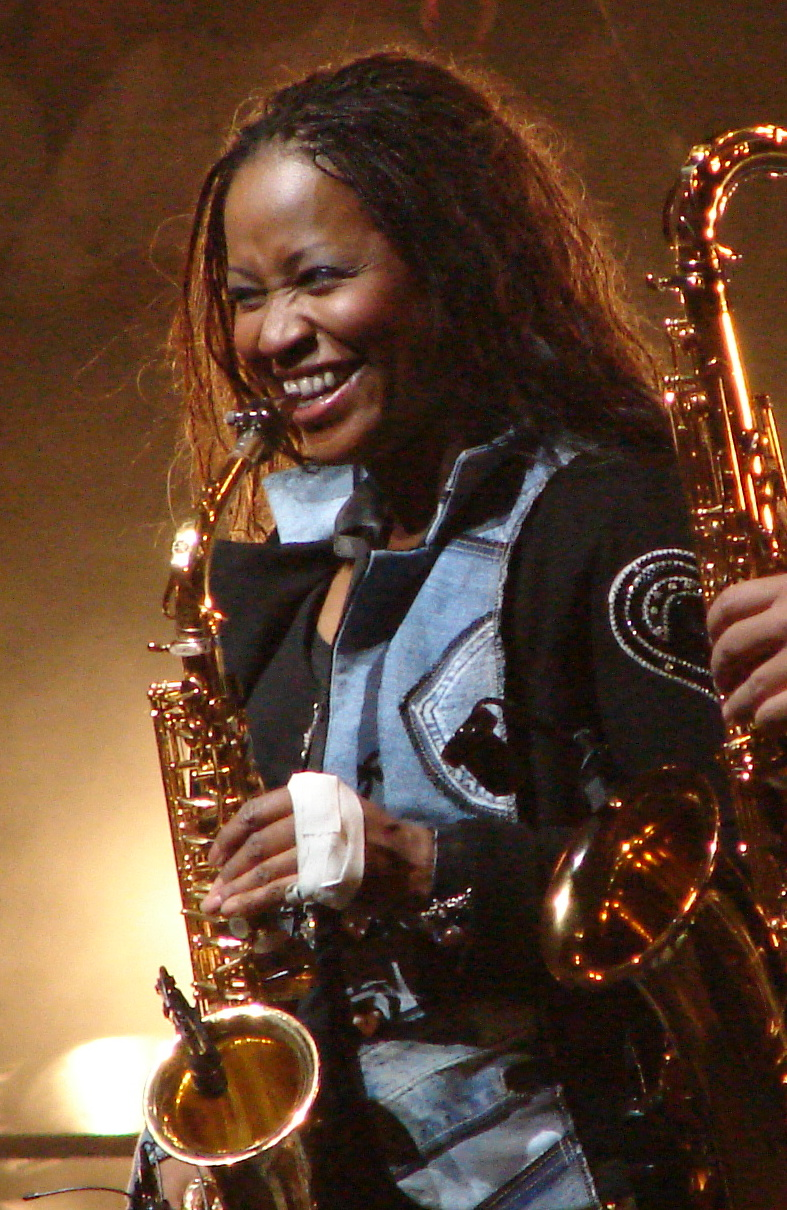
- Taliefero performing in May 2007

Background information
- Born: January 5, 1963 (age 63); Bourne, Massachusetts, US
- Genres: Rock; rhythm and blues
- Occupation: Musician
- Instruments: Percussion; saxophone; harmonica; vocals; guitar; drums
- Years active: 1974–present
- Formerly of: Billy Joel Band
- Website: crystaltaliefero.com

Crystal Taliefero-Pratt (née Taliefero, born January 5, 1963) is an American multi-instrumentalist and vocalist. Taliefero grew up with a musical family, performing rhythm and blues with her brother in the Chicago metropolitan area. During her college years she was discovered by John Mellencamp, who helped guide her to a career as a professional musician. Taliefero performed with several artists throughout the 1980s and 1990s. In 1989 she was hired as a studio musician for the Billy Joel Band, and she has been touring and recording with them ever since.

== Early life ==
Born in Bourne, Massachusetts, Taliefero spent most of her childhood in Hammond, Indiana. By the age of 11 she had begun performing rhythm and blues around Hammond and nearby Gary, Indiana, where her family moved two years later. She joined her brother Charles in the singing group Black Mist (later renamed Magic Mist), who performed in the Chicago area.

Taliefero attended William A. Wirt High School where she was a top athlete and graduated in 1981. She studied music at Indiana University, eventually making the dean's list. There, Taliefero was part of the Indiana University Soul Revue, Dr. James Mumford tutoring her. She was a member of Delta Sigma Theta sorority.

== Career ==
In college Taliefero performed in a band called Kilo, which included future Saturday Night Live drummer Shawn Pelton, former Tonight Show bassist Robert Hurst, and trumpeter Chris Botti. John Mellencamp's drummer Kenny Aronoff often sat in on drums, and in 1986 after hearing the first song of a live performance, Mellencamp invited Taliefero to join his touring band. In a Spring 2011 interview, Taliefero credited her experience with Mellencamp as the fundamental training that "changed the whole course of [her] life". In 1989, Mellencamp took time off as a musician to focus on painting. When asked, he lent Taliefero $3000, and with that she headed to New York City to pursue more musical opportunities.

Two and a half months into living in New York, Taliefero received a phone call from a Mellencamp associate, asking her to play drums and sing for 1989's Storm Front, the upcoming album from Billy Joel. After a successful audition, she was invited to join the Billy Joel Band, who she has been with ever since. With time, Taliefero claimed the role as background vocal arranger, which she is credited with on 1993's River of Dreams.

In 1991 Taliefero accompanied Bee Gees in their tour. A show in Europe needed an opening act, and they asked if she could perform some of her own material. She then formed a one-off band called Bonzai for the opening show which featured Pat Peterson, a Mellencamp backup singer, backed by the Bee Gees band.

The year 1992 saw Taliefero taking a lead role in Bruce Springsteen's extensive 107-date world tour, ending in June 1993. The tour landed Taliefero a number of press hits. New York Times music critic Jon Pareles described Taliefero as a "sassy female foil", while Edna Gundersen of USA Today praised her performance alongside Springsteen. Taliefero's collaboration with Springsteen also includes a 1992 MTV Unplugged documentary performance. Gary Graff, writing in the Detroit Free Press, lamented that Taliefero only played saxophone on "Born to Run" and said that he missed longtime E Street Band saxophonist Clarence Clemons, who was not invited on the tour.

Taliefero has performed with a wide range of other artists, including Faith Hill, Garth Brooks, Joe Cocker, Tina Arena, Bob Seger, Brooks & Dunn, Richie Sambora, Elton John, Enrique Iglesias, Natalie Merchant, Meat Loaf, and Michael McDonald.Northern Pikes

== Musicianship ==
Taliefero's credits as a musician are chiefly as a vocalist and percussionist. Instruments in her percussion kit include bongos, cabasa, mark tree, congas, cowbell, güiro, hand percussion, jam block, shaker, tambourine, timbales, triangle, Djembe, and wood block. In addition, Taliefero is also quite accomplished on the guitar, keyboards, harmonica and saxophone, among other wind instruments. She is known for her energetic stage performances.

In its 2008 article "The 125-Plus People, Places and Things Ruling the Rock & Roll Universe", Rolling Stone magazine declared Taliefero the "Best Secret Weapon".

== Personal life ==
In 1986, Taliefero suffered a ruptured appendix while touring with Bob Seger. She was hospitalized for several weeks.

Taliefero's goal is to establish the Taliefero Music Foundation that will inspire and shape young upcoming lives in the world of live entertainment. As part of her purpose to inspire young musicians, she visited Central High School in East Chicago, Indiana (her home state), in 2009.

Taliefero was awarded the Indiana University African-American Arts Institute's Herman C. Hudson Alumni Award on April 19, 2011. In a congratulatory statement, Billy Joel noted that some of his songs would not have been written without her inspiration.

== Film and book collaborations ==
Taliefero has contributed narration, compositions and/or music to a range of child-oriented videos and audiobooks though the Weston Woods Studios division of Scholastic Corporation:

- Martin, Bill Jr. (1989). Chicka Chicka Boom Boom. Ehlert, Lois (illustrator); Taliefero, Crystal (narrator). ISBN 1-55924-577-8.
- Lester, Julius. John Henry. Narrated by Jackson, Samuel L. and Taliefero, Crystal (June 1998 ed.). ISBN 0-7882-0086-0.
- Ehlert, Lois (2007). Planting a Rainbow. Taliefero, Crystal (narrator). BNID 2000003675593.
- Rappaport, Doreen (2002). Martin's Big Words. Collier, Bryan (illustrator); Duncan, Michael Clarke (narrator); Taliefero, Crystal (music). ISBN 1-60514-944-6.
- Martin, Bill Jr. (2006). Chicka Chicka 1 2 3. Ehlert, Lois (illustrator); Taliefero, Crystal (narrator). ISBN 0-439-89629-0.
- Ehlert, Lois (2007). Planting a Rainbow. Taliefero, Crystal (narrator). BNID 2000003675593.
- Ehlert, Lois (2007). Waiting for Wings. Taliefero, Crystal (narrator). BNID 2000003675067.
- Hamanaka, Sheila (2007). All the Colors of the Earth. Taliefero, Crystal (narrator). BNID 2000003674978.
