= The Bridge Tour =

1986–87 concert tour by Billy Joel

- Tour by Billy Joel
- Tour program
- Location: North America • Europe • Oceania • Asia
- Associated album: The Bridge
- Start date: September 29, 1986
- End date: November 28, 1987
- Legs: 5
- No. of shows: 151

Billy Joel concert chronology
- An Innocent Man Tour (1984); The Bridge Tour (1986–87); Storm Front Tour (1989–91)

The Bridge Tour was a 1986–1987 concert tour by singer-songwriter Billy Joel. This tour was the first tour by Joel in over two years, during which he married Christie Brinkley, had his daughter Alexa Ray Joel, and written and recorded The Bridge album.

== Background ==
Following a performance on Late Night with David Letterman, the tour began on September 29, 1986, in Glens Falls, New York and ended on August 5, 1987, with the last of six shows across the Soviet Union in Leningrad.

The tour continued on October 17 under a new name ("The Encore Australasian Tour") and returned across Australia and in New Zealand. The tour officially ended on November 28, 1987, in Christchurch, New Zealand.

== Tour dates ==
Date	City	Country	Venue
North America Leg
September 29, 1986	Glens Falls	United States	Glens Falls Civic Center
October 2, 1986	Buffalo	United States	Buffalo Memorial Auditorium
October 4, 1986	Providence	United States	Providence Civic Center
October 7, 1986	Philadelphia	United States	The Spectrum
October 8, 1986	Philadelphia	United States	The Spectrum
October 10, 1986	Landover	United States	Capital Centre
October 13, 1986	Philadelphia	United States	The Spectrum
October 15, 1986	New York City	United States	Madison Square Garden
October 17, 1986	New York City	United States	Madison Square Garden
October 18, 1986	New York City	United States	Madison Square Garden
October 21, 1986	Worcester	United States	The Centrum
October 22, 1986	Worcester	United States	The Centrum
October 24, 1986	New Haven	United States	New Haven Coliseum
October 25, 1986	New Haven	United States	New Haven Coliseum
October 26, 1986	Richfield	United States	Richfield Coliseum
October 27, 1986	Pittsburgh	United States	Civic Arena
October 29, 1986	Richfield	United States	Richfield Coliseum
October 31, 1986	Rosemont	United States	Rosemont Horizon
November 1, 1986	Rosemont	United States	Rosemont Horizon
November 3, 1986	Saint Paul	United States	St. Paul Civic Center
November 5, 1986	Omaha	United States	Omaha Civic Auditorium
November 7, 1986	Detroit	United States	Joe Louis Arena
November 8, 1986	Detroit	United States	Joe Louis Arena
November 14, 1986	Provo	United States	Marriott Center
November 15, 1986	Denver	United States	McNichols Sports Arena
November 18, 1986	Tucson	United States	Tucson Convention Center
November 19, 1986	Tempe	United States	ASU Activity Center
November 21, 1986	San Diego	United States	San Diego Sports Arena
November 22, 1986	Inglewood	United States	The Forum
November 24, 1986	Oakland	United States	Oakland–Alameda County Coliseum Arena
November 26, 1986	Sacramento	United States	Sacramento Sports Arena
November 28, 1986	Vancouver	Canada	Pacific Coliseum
December 1, 1986	Portland	United States	Portland Memorial Coliseum
December 2, 1986	Tacoma	United States	Tacoma Dome
December 5, 1986	Edmonton	Canada	Northlands Coliseum
December 6, 1986	Calgary	Canada	Olympic Saddledome
December 8, 1986	Winnipeg	Canada	Winnipeg Arena
December 11, 1986	Toronto	Canada	Maple Leaf Gardens
December 13, 1986	Ottawa	Canada	Ottawa Civic Centre
December 14, 1986	Montreal	Canada	Montreal Forum
December 18, 1986	Uniondale	United States	Nassau Veterans Memorial Coliseum
December 19, 1986	Uniondale	United States	Nassau Veterans Memorial Coliseum
December 21, 1986	Uniondale	United States	Nassau Veterans Memorial Coliseum
December 22, 1986	Uniondale	United States	Nassau Veterans Memorial Coliseum
January 7, 1987	Philadelphia	United States	The Spectrum
January 8, 1987	Philadelphia	United States	The Spectrum
January 11, 1987	Richfield	United States	Richfield Coliseum
January 12, 1987	Richfield	United States	Richfield Coliseum
January 15, 1987	Pittsburgh	United States	Civic Arena
January 16, 1987	Buffalo	United States	Buffalo Memorial Auditorium
January 19, 1987	Worcester	United States	The Centrum
January 20, 1987	Worcester	United States	The Centrum
January 24, 1987	Philadelphia	United States	The Spectrum
January 26, 1987	Landover	United States	Capital Centre
January 30, 1987	Portland	United States	Cumberland County Civic Center
February 1, 1987	Providence	United States	Providence Civic Center
February 2, 1987	Hartford	United States	Hartford Civic Center
February 5, 1987	Ann Arbor	United States	Crisler Arena
February 6, 1987	Louisville	United States	Freedom Hall
February 8, 1987	Indianapolis	United States	Market Square Arena
February 10, 1987	Cincinnati	United States	Riverfront Coliseum
February 12, 1987	St. Louis	United States	St. Louis Arena
February 13, 1987	Kansas City	United States	Kemper Arena
February 15, 1987	Ames	United States	Hilton Coliseum
February 23, 1987	Pembroke Pines	United States	Hollywood Sportatorium
February 24, 1987	Pembroke Pines	United States	Hollywood Sportatorium
February 27, 1987	Tampa	United States	USF Sun Dome
February 28, 1987	Tampa	United States	USF Sun Dome
March 2, 1987	Tampa	United States	USF Sun Dome
March 4, 1987	Pembroke Pines	United States	Hollywood Sportatorium
March 7, 1987	Birmingham	United States	Birmingham-Jefferson Civic Center Coliseum
March 11, 1987	Memphis	United States	Mid-South Coliseum
March 13, 1987	Chattanooga	United States	UTC Arena
March 15, 1987	Murfreesboro	United States	Murphy Center
March 16, 1987	Columbia	United States	Carolina Coliseum
March 19, 1987	Hampton	United States	Hampton Coliseum
March 20, 1987	Atlanta	United States	Omni Coliseum
March 21, 1987	Atlanta	United States	Omni Coliseum
March 22, 1987	Atlanta	United States	Omni Coliseum
March 24, 1987	Jacksonville	United States	Jacksonville Coliseum
March 26, 1987	Charlotte	United States	Charlotte Coliseum
March 27, 1987	Chapel Hill	United States	Dean Smith Center
March 30, 1987	Hartford	United States	Hartford Civic Center
April 2, 1987	Indianapolis	United States	Market Square Arena
April 9, 1987	Reno	United States	Lawlor Events Center
April 11, 1987	Las Vegas	United States	Thomas & Mack Center
April 13, 1987	Long Beach	United States	Long Beach Arena
April 16, 1987	Houston	United States	The Summit
April 17, 1987	Dallas	United States	Reunion Arena
April 18, 1987	Lafayette	United States	Cajundome
April 22, 1987	Austin	United States	Frank Erwin Center
April 24, 1987	St. Louis	United States	St. Louis Arena
April 25, 1987	Iowa City	United States	Carver–Hawkeye Arena
April 27, 1987	Toledo	United States	Centennial Hall
May 1, 1987	East Rutherford	United States	Brendan Byrne Arena
May 2, 1987	East Rutherford	United States	Brendan Byrne Arena
May 4, 1987	East Rutherford	United States	Brendan Byrne Arena
May 6, 1987	East Rutherford	United States	Brendan Byrne Arena
May 8, 1987	East Rutherford	United States	Brendan Byrne Arena
May 9, 1987	East Rutherford	United States	Brendan Byrne Arena
Oceania
May 18, 1987	Brisbane	Australia	Brisbane Entertainment Centre
May 21, 1987	Sydney	Australia	Sydney Entertainment Centre
May 22, 1987	Sydney	Australia	Sydney Entertainment Centre
May 25, 1987	Sydney	Australia	Sydney Entertainment Centre
May 26, 1987	Sydney	Australia	Sydney Entertainment Centre
May 29, 1987	Sydney	Australia	Sydney Entertainment Centre
May 30, 1987	Sydney	Australia	Sydney Entertainment Centre
June 1, 1987	Melbourne	Australia	Sports and Entertainment Centre
June 2, 1987	Melbourne	Australia	Sports and Entertainment Centre
Asia
June 8, 1987	Tokyo	Japan	Yoyogi National Gymnasium
June 10, 1987	Tokyo	Japan	Yoyogi National Gymnasium
June 12, 1987	Osaka	Japan	Osaka-jō Hall
June 13, 1987	Osaka	Japan	Osaka-jō Hall
June 16, 1987	Tokyo	Japan	Yoyogi National Gymnasium
June 18, 1987	Tokyo	Japan	Yoyogi National Gymnasium
June 19, 1987	Tokyo	Japan	Yoyogi National Gymnasium
Europe
July 5, 1987	Birmingham	England	National Exhibition Centre
July 6, 1987	Birmingham	England	National Exhibition Centre
July 9, 1987	London	England	Wembley Arena
July 11, 1987	London	England	Wembley Arena
July 12, 1987	London	England	Wembley Arena
July 15, 1987	London	England	Wembley Arena
July 16, 1987	London	England	Wembley Arena
July 26, 1987	Moscow	Soviet Union	Olympic Stadium
July 27, 1987	Moscow	Soviet Union	Olympic Stadium
July 29, 1987	Moscow	Soviet Union	Olympic Stadium
August 2, 1987	Leningrad	Soviet Union	V. I. Lenin Sport & Concert Complex
August 3, 1987	Leningrad	Soviet Union	V. I. Lenin Sport & Concert Complex
August 5, 1987	Leningrad	Soviet Union	V. I. Lenin Sport & Concert Complex
"The Encore Australasian Tour"
October 12, 1987	Honolulu	United States	Aloha Stadium
October 17, 1987	Adelaide	Australia	Thebarton Oval
October 19, 1987	Sydney	Australia	Sydney Entertainment Centre
October 21, 1987	Sydney	Australia	Sydney Entertainment Centre
October 22, 1987	Sydney	Australia	Sydney Entertainment Centre
October 25, 1987	Sydney	Australia	Sydney Entertainment Centre
October 26, 1987	Sydney	Australia	Sydney Entertainment Centre
October 28, 1987	Sydney	Australia	Sydney Entertainment Centre
October 30, 1987	Melbourne	Australia	Kooyong Stadium
October 31, 1987	Melbourne	Australia	Kooyong Stadium
November 3, 1987	Perth	Australia	Perth Entertainment Centre
November 4, 1987	Perth	Australia	Perth Entertainment Centre
November 6, 1987	Perth	Australia	Perth Entertainment Centre
November 9, 1987	Melbourne	Australia	Kooyong Stadium
November 10, 1987	Melbourne	Australia	Kooyong Stadium
November 12, 1987	Melbourne	Australia	Kooyong Stadium
November 13, 1987	Melbourne	Australia	Kooyong Stadium
November 16, 1987	Brisbane	Australia	Brisbane Entertainment Centre
November 17, 1987	Brisbane	Australia	Brisbane Entertainment Centre
November 22, 1987	Auckland	New Zealand	Mount Smart Stadium
November 25, 1987	Wellington	New Zealand	Athletic Park
November 28, 1987	Christchurch	New Zealand	Lancaster Park

== Setlists ==
Glens Falls Civic Center, Glens Falls, NY 9/29/1986
1. "Rhapsody in Blue" (Opening Music)
2. "Running on Ice"
3. "Pressure"
4. "You're Only Human (Second Wind)"
5. "Piano Man"
6. "Scenes from an Italian Restaurant"
7. "Vienna"
8. "Allentown"
9. "Goodnight Saigon"
10. "This Is The Time"
11. "Big Man on Mulberry Street"
12. "Baby Grand"
13. "Prelude/Angry Young Man"
14. "Stiletto"
15. "An Innocent Man"
16. "The Longest Time"
17. "Just The Way You Are"
18. "Only the Good Die Young"
19. "It's Still Rock and Roll to Me"
20. "Sometimes a Fantasy"
21. "You May Be Right"
22. "A Matter of Trust"
23. "Uptown Girl"
24. "Tell Her About It"
25. "Big Shot"
26. "Keeping the Faith"
27. "This Night"
The Spectrum, Philadelphia, PA 10/13/1986
1. "Rhapsody in Blue" (Opening Music)
2. "A Matter of Trust"
3. "Pressure"
4. "You're Only Human (Second Wind)"
5. "Piano Man"
6. "Scenes from an Italian Restaurant"
7. "Vienna"
8. "Allentown"
9. "Goodnight Saigon"
10. "This Is The Time"
11. "Big Man on Mulberry Street"
12. "Baby Grand"
13. "Prelude/Angry Young Man"
14. "The Ballad of Billy the Kid"
15. "An Innocent Man"
16. "The Longest Time"
17. "Just The Way You Are"
18. "Only the Good Die Young"
19. "It's Still Rock and Roll to Me"
20. "Sometimes a Fantasy"
21. "You May Be Right"
22. "Uptown Girl"
23. "Tell Her About It"
24. "Captain Jack"
Brendan Byrne Arena, East Rutherford, NJ 5/9/1987
1. "Rhapsody in Blue" (Opening Music)
2. "A Matter of Trust"
3. "Pressure"
4. "You're Only Human (Second Wind)"
5. "Piano Man"
6. "Scenes from an Italian Restaurant"
7. "Allentown"
8. "Goodnight Saigon"
9. "Don't Ask Me Why"
10. "Big Man on Mulberry Street"
11. "Baby Grand"
12. "Prelude/Angry Young Man"
13. "An Innocent Man"
14. "What's Your Name?" (unreleased song)
15. "The Longest Time"
16. "Only the Good Die Young"
17. "It's Still Rock and Roll to Me"
18. "Sometimes a Fantasy"
19. "You May Be Right"
20. "Uptown Girl"
21. "Keeping the Faith"
22. "Back in the U.S.S.R."
23. "Big Shot"
SKK Arena, Leningrad, Soviet Union 8/2/1987
1. "Rhapsody in Blue" (Opening Music)
2. "Prelude/Angry Young Man"
3. "Honesty"
4. "The Ballad of Billy the Kid"
5. "She's Always a Woman"
6. "Scenes from an Italian Restaurant"
7. "Allentown"
8. "Goodnight Saigon"
9. "Stiletto"
10. "Big Man on Mulberry Street"
11. "Baby Grand"
12. "An Innocent Man"
13. "The Longest Time"
14. "A Matter of Trust"
15. "Only the Good Die Young"
16. "It's Still Rock and Roll to Me"
17. "Sometimes a Fantasy"
18. "You May Be Right"
19. "Uptown Girl"
20. "Big Shot"
21. "Back in the U.S.S.R."

== Personnel ==
- Billy Joel – lead vocals, piano, keyboards, harmonica, rhythm guitar (only on "A Matter of Trust")
- Mark Rivera – saxophone, flute, clarinet, vocals, percussion, keyboards, rhythm guitar
- Doug Stegmeyer – bass guitar, vocals
- David Brown – lead guitar, vocals (North American leg only)
- Kevin Dukes – lead guitar, vocals (both Oceanian legs and European leg)
- Russell Javors – rhythm guitar, vocals
- David Lebolt – keyboards
- Liberty DeVitto – drums, percussion
- Peter Hewlett – percussion, backing vocals
- George Simms – percussion, backing vocals
