= An Innocent Man Tour =

1984 concert tour by Billy Joel

- Tour by Billy Joel
- Tour program
- Location: North America • Europe • Asia
- Associated album: An Innocent Man
- Start date: January 18, 1984
- End date: July 5, 1984
- Legs: 4
- No. of shows: 67

Billy Joel concert chronology
- The Nylon Curtain Tour (1982); An Innocent Man Tour (1984); The Bridge Tour (1986–87)

The An Innocent Man Tour was a 1984 concert tour by singer-songwriter Billy Joel. The tour began on January 18 in Providence, Rhode Island (which went on despite a snow storm) and ended on July 5 with the last of seven shows at Madison Square Garden in New York City.

The tour was very popular, with a contemporaneous report stating that finding tickets except through scalpers was "virtually impossible." A report on the February 1, 1984 Toledo show stated that his band included Frank Simms, Pete Hewlett and Bob Duncan on backing vocals, a three-piece brass section of Larry Etkin, Bob Livingood on trumpets, Glenn Stulpin on saxophones as well as Joel's touring/recording band of Liberty DeVitto (drums, percussion), Doug Stegmeyer (bass), Russell Javors (rhythm guitar), David LeBolt (keyboards), David Brown (lead guitar), and Mark Rivera (saxophones, percussion).

== Tour dates ==
Date	City	Country	Venue	Tickets sold / available	Revenue
North American leg 1
January 18, 1984	Providence	United States	Providence Civic Center	13,349 / 13,349	$190,462
January 20, 1984	Portland	United States	Cumberland County Civic Center	8,341 / 8,341	$125,420
January 22, 1984	Hershey	United States	Hersheypark Arena	8,212 / 8,212	$123,180
January 25, 1984	New Haven	United States	New Haven Coliseum	21,693 / 21,693	$318,365
January 26, 1984	New Haven	United States	New Haven Coliseum	21,693 / 21,693	$318,365
January 28, 1984	Landover	United States	Capital Centre	16,502 / 16,502	$247,530
January 30, 1984	Rochester	United States	Rochester Community War Memorial	9,281 / 9,281	$135,432
February 1, 1984	Toledo	United States	Centennial Hall	—N/a	—N/a
February 2, 1984	Notre Dame	United States	Athletic & Convocation Center	9,931 / 9,931	$132,111
February 4, 1984	Ann Arbor	United States	Crisler Arena	13,697 / 13,697	$196,607
February 5, 1984	Indianapolis	United States	Market Square Arena	15,727 / 15,727	$231,720
February 8, 1984	Charlotte	United States	Charlotte Coliseum	10,923 / 10,923	$147,460
February 10, 1984	Lexington	United States	Rupp Arena	13,537 / 13,537	$183,427
February 11, 1984	Chattanooga	United States	UTC Arena	9,406 / 9,406	$126,981
February 13, 1984	Philadelphia	United States	The Spectrum	37,416 / 37,416	$518,324
February 14, 1984	Philadelphia	United States	The Spectrum	37,416 / 37,416	$518,324
February 17, 1984	Norfolk	United States	Norfolk Scope	—N/a	—N/a
February 19, 1984	Murfreesboro	United States	Murphy Center	10,200 / 10,200	$143,636
February 21, 1984	Orlando	United States	Orange County Convention Center	10,596 / 10,596	$156,195
February 23, 1984	Biloxi	United States	Mississippi Coast Coliseum	10,926 / 10,926	$147,501
February 24, 1984	Baton Rouge	United States	LSU Assembly Center	12,923 / 12,923	$188,145
March 15, 1984	Pembroke Pines	United States	Hollywood Sportatorium	—N/a	—N/a
March 17, 1984	St. Petersburg	United States	Bayfront Center	8,132 / 8,132	$120,810
March 20, 1984	Atlanta	United States	Omni Coliseum	13,848 / 13,848	$202,552
March 23, 1984	Richfield	United States	Richfield Coliseum	—N/a	—N/a
March 24, 1984	Pittsburgh	United States	Civic Arena	16,629 / 16,629	$247,366
March 26, 1984	Boston	United States	Boston Garden	15,509 / 15,509	$221,225
March 28, 1984	Buffalo	United States	Buffalo Memorial Auditorium	—N/a	—N/a
March 30, 1984	Rosemont	United States	Rosemont Horizon	14,210 / 14,210	$426,300
March 31, 1984	Rosemont	United States	Rosemont Horizon	14,210 / 14,210	$426,300
April 3, 1984	Cincinnati	United States	Riverfront Coliseum	12,000 / 17,000	—N/a
April 4, 1984	Detroit	United States	Joe Louis Arena	17,005 / 17,005	$255,075
April 6, 1984	Iowa City	United States	Carver–Hawkeye Arena	14,973 / 14,973	$219,006
April 7, 1984	Saint Paul	United States	St. Paul Civic Center	—N/a	—N/a
April 9, 1984	Lincoln	United States	Bob Devaney Sports Center	—N/a	—N/a
April 11, 1984	Oklahoma City	United States	The Myriad	—N/a	—N/a
April 14, 1984	Dallas	United States	Reunion Arena	15,544 / 15,544	$231,270
April 15, 1984	Houston	United States	The Summit	13,398 / 13,398	$214,533
April 17, 1984	Kansas City	United States	Kemper Arena	13,318 / 13,318	$197,204
April 19, 1984	St. Louis	United States	St. Louis Arena	13,066 / 13,066	$190,298
April 21, 1984	Denver	United States	McNichols Sports Arena	15,219 / 15,219	$225,872
April 23, 1984	Salt Lake City	United States	Salt Palace	—N/a	—N/a
April 26, 1984	Tempe	United States	ASU Activity Center	13,014 / 13,014	$191,395
April 27, 1984	Tucson	United States	Tucson Convention Center	—N/a	—N/a
April 29, 1984	Inglewood	United States	The Forum	—N/a	—N/a
April 30, 1984	Inglewood	United States	The Forum	—N/a	—N/a
May 3, 1984	San Diego	United States	San Diego Sports Arena	—N/a	—N/a
May 5, 1984	Oakland	United States	Oakland–Alameda County Coliseum Arena	13,799 / 13,799	$201,340
May 8, 1984	Tacoma	United States	Tacoma Dome	18,765 / 18,765	$277,590
May 9, 1984	Portland	United States	Portland Memorial Coliseum	11,000 / 11,000	$164,045
Asia
May 21, 1984	Tokyo	Japan	Budokan	—N/a	—N/a
May 22, 1984	Tokyo	Japan	Budokan	—N/a	—N/a
May 24, 1984	Osaka	Japan	Osaka Castle Hall	—N/a	—N/a
May 26, 1984	Osaka	Japan	Osaka Castle Hall	—N/a	—N/a
May 28, 1984	Nagoya	Japan	Aichi Prefectural Gymnasium	—N/a	—N/a
May 30, 1984	Tokyo	Japan	Budokan	—N/a	—N/a
May 31, 1984	Tokyo	Japan	Budokan	—N/a	—N/a
Europe
June 6, 1984	London	England	Wembley Arena	—N/a	—N/a
June 8, 1984	London	England	Wembley Arena	—N/a	—N/a
June 9, 1984	London	England	Wembley Arena	—N/a	—N/a
North American leg 2
June 23, 1984	New York City	United States	Madison Square Garden	139,300 / 139,300	$2,100,000
June 24, 1984	New York City	United States	Madison Square Garden	139,300 / 139,300	$2,100,000
June 26, 1984	New York City	United States	Madison Square Garden	139,300 / 139,300	$2,100,000
June 27, 1984	New York City	United States	Madison Square Garden	139,300 / 139,300	$2,100,000
June 29, 1984	New York City	United States	Madison Square Garden	139,300 / 139,300	$2,100,000
July 1, 1984	New York City	United States	Madison Square Garden	139,300 / 139,300	$2,100,000
July 5, 1984	New York City	United States	Madison Square Garden	139,300 / 139,300	$2,100,000

== Setlist ==
This setlist is from the June 6–9 Broadcast at Wembley Arena. It does not represent all the dates throughout the tour.

1. "The Mexican Connection"
2. "Prelude/Angry Young Man"
3. "My Life"
4. "Piano Man"
5. "Don't Ask Me Why"
6. "Allentown"
7. "Goodnight Saigon"
8. "Pressure"
9. "Leave a Tender Moment Alone" (with Toots Thielemans)
10. "An Innocent Man"
11. "What's Your Name?" (unreleased song)
12. "The Longest Time"
13. "This Night"
14. "Just the Way You Are"
15. "Scenes from an Italian Restaurant"
16. "Sometimes a Fantasy"
17. "It's Still Rock and Roll to Me"
18. "Uptown Girl"
19. "Big Shot"
20. "Tell Her About It"
21. "You May Be Right"
22. "Only the Good Die Young"
