= The Stranger (Billy Joel song) =

- Japanese single cover

Single by Billy Joel

from the album The Stranger
- B-side: "Movin' Out (Anthony's Song)"
- Released: May 21, 1978 (Japan)
- Recorded: A & R Recording, Inc., New York City, 1977
- Genre: Funk rock
- Length: 5:10 (Album version); 4:10 (Single version)
- Label: Columbia; CBS Sony (Japan)
- Songwriter: Billy Joel
- Producer: Phil Ramone

Billy Joel singles chronology
"She's Always a Woman" (1978)	"The Stranger" (1978)	"Only the Good Die Young" (1978)

"The Stranger" is a song by rock artist Billy Joel and the title track from his 1977 album of the same name. The song was released as a single in Japan where it became very popular and peaked at No. 2 on the Oricon chart, selling more than 471,000 copies, charting as well in Australia, New Zealand and France. It was the last single from the album in Japan, while the US and UK saw "She's Always a Woman", released the previous year, as the last single from the album. The single is featured on Joel's greatest hits album Greatest Hits – Volume I & II.

== Background ==
The song begins and ends with a quiet melody, played on piano and whistled by Joel with accompaniment from his band. He had originally wanted it to be played by some kind of wind instrument, but after he whistled it as a demonstration, producer Phil Ramone persuaded him to abandon the idea and whistle the melody himself for the final cut.

An untitled two-minute instrumental "hidden track" reprise of this song is featured at the end of the album The Stranger, after "Everybody Has a Dream".

"The Stranger" has been sampled frequently, primarily in the hip hop genre, in songs such as "Tha Shiznit" by Snoop Dogg.

== Track listing ==
=== 7" vinyl (CBS) ===
1. "The Stranger"
2. "Just the Way You Are"

=== Japanese 7" vinyl ===
1. "The Stranger" [4:10]
2. "Movin' Out (Anthony's Song)" [3:30]

== Chart history ==
Chart (1978)	Peak position
Australia (Kent Music Report)	59
France (IFOP)	59
Japan (Oricon Singles Chart)	2
New Zealand (RIANZ)	8

== Certifications ==
Region	Certification	Certified units/sales
United States (RIAA)	Gold	500,000^{‡}
^{‡} Sales+streaming figures based on certification alone.
