= List of Hot Adult Contemporary number ones of 1984 =

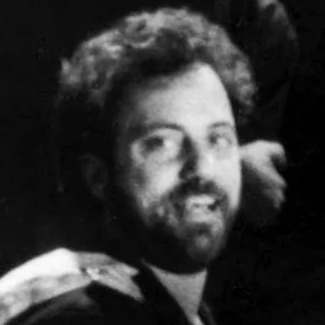
Billy Joel (pictured in 1985) was a three-time chart-topper in 1984.

In 1984, Billboard magazine published a chart ranking the top-performing songs in the United States in the adult contemporary music (AC) market. During the year, 18 songs topped the chart based on playlists submitted by radio stations. The chart was published under the title Adult Contemporary through the issue of Billboard dated October 13 and Hot Adult Contemporary thereafter. Since 1996 it has again been published as Adult Contemporary.

In the January 7 issue of Billboard the number one song was "Read 'Em and Weep" by Barry Manilow, which was in its third week at number one. It held the top spot for four weeks in 1984 before being replaced by "Think of Laura" by Christopher Cross. The most successful act on the AC chart in 1984 was Lionel Richie, who had three number ones and spent a total of fifteen weeks in the top spot, three times that achieved by any other act during the year. Billy Joel also had three chart-toppers during the year but only spent a total of five weeks at number one. Richie, the lead singer of the Commodores, had launched his solo career in 1982 and quickly reached superstar status. He had the two longest-running number ones of 1984 on the AC listing, spending six consecutive weeks atop the chart with "Hello" and five weeks with "Stuck on You". While "Stuck on You" was at number one, he performed at the closing ceremony of the 1984 Summer Olympics. Richie and Joel were the only acts with more than one chart-topper in 1984.

Three songs topped both the AC listing and Billboard's pop chart, the Hot 100, in 1984, including Richie's "Hello". In June, Cyndi Lauper topped both listings with "Time After Time" and later in the year Stevie Wonder reached number one on both charts with "I Just Called to Say I Love You". The latter song, from the soundtrack of the film The Woman in Red, won the Academy Award for Best Original Song. In December, the Honeydrippers, a short-lived supergroup brought together by the singer Robert Plant and featuring among others his former Led Zeppelin bandmate Jimmy Page, topped the chart with their cover version of the 1950s song "Sea of Love". It was the first Billboard number-one single for Plant and Page, surpassing the best position achieved by Led Zeppelin, who had topped the magazine's albums chart six times but had never reached number one on the Hot 100 and had never entered the AC chart at all. "Sea of Love" was replaced at number one by "Do What You Do" by Jermaine Jackson, which was the final chart-topper of the year.

== Chart history ==
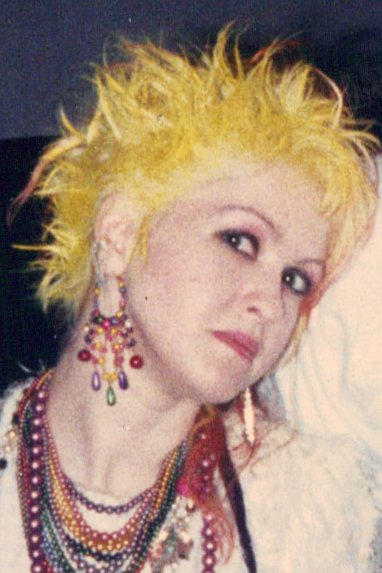
Cyndi Lauper (pictured in 1985) topped the chart with "Time After Time".

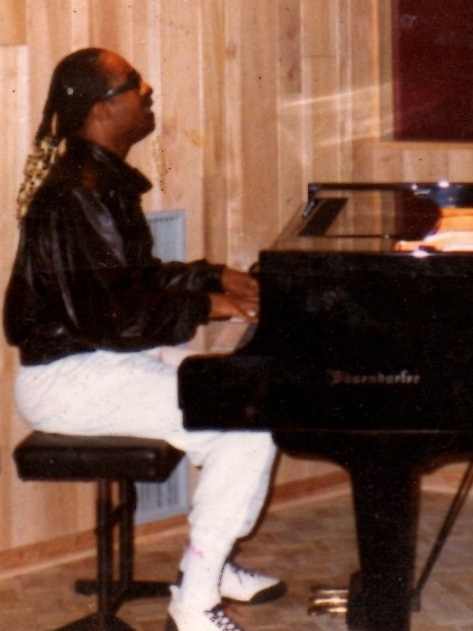
"I Just Called to Say I Love You" by Stevie Wonder (pictured recording the song) also topped the Hot 100 and won the musician an Academy Award.

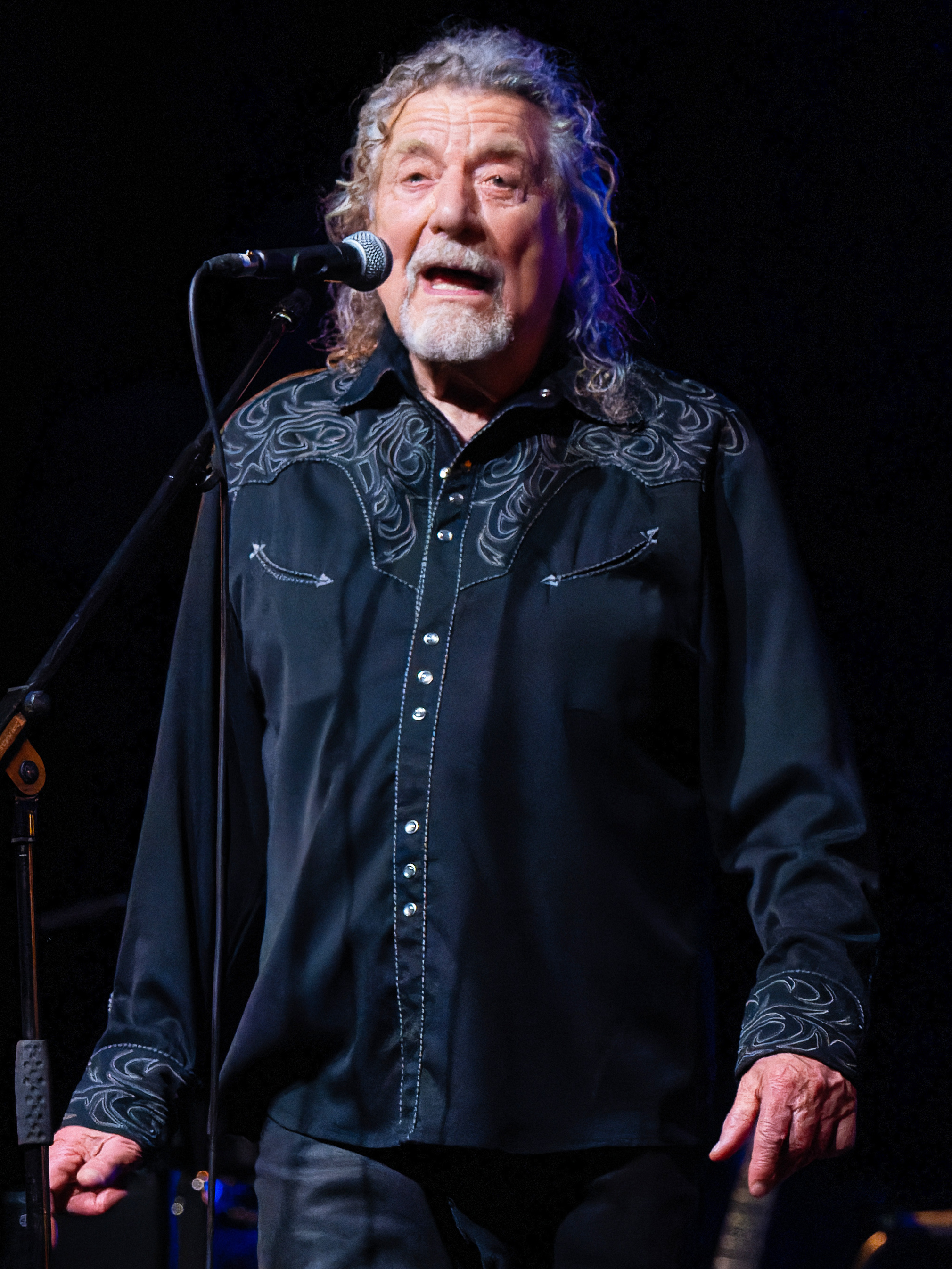
The Honeydrippers, the short-lived supergroup fronted by Robert Plant (pictured in 2025), topped the chart with "Sea of Love".

Chart history
| Issue date | Title | Artist(s) | Ref. |
|---|---|---|---|
| January 7 | "Read 'Em and Weep" | Barry Manilow | |
| January 14 | "Read 'Em and Weep" | Barry Manilow | |
| January 21 | "Read 'Em and Weep" | Barry Manilow | |
| January 28 | "Read 'Em and Weep" | Barry Manilow | |
| February 4 | "Think of Laura" | Christopher Cross | |
| February 11 | "Think of Laura" | Christopher Cross | |
| February 18 | "Think of Laura" | Christopher Cross | |
| February 25 | "Think of Laura" | Christopher Cross | |
| March 3 | "An Innocent Man" | Billy Joel | |
| March 10 | "Got a Hold on Me" | Christine McVie | |
| March 17 | "Got a Hold on Me" | Christine McVie | |
| March 24 | "Got a Hold on Me" | Christine McVie | |
| March 31 | "Got a Hold on Me" | Christine McVie | |
| April 7 | "Hello" | Lionel Richie | |
| April 14 | "Hello" | Lionel Richie | |
| April 21 | "Hello" | Lionel Richie | |
| April 28 | "Hello" | Lionel Richie | |
| May 5 | "Hello" | Lionel Richie | |
| May 12 | "Hello" | Lionel Richie | |
| May 19 | "The Longest Time" | Billy Joel | |
| May 26 | "The Longest Time" | Billy Joel | |
| June 2 | "Time After Time" | Cyndi Lauper | |
| June 9 | "Time After Time" | Cyndi Lauper | |
| June 16 | "Time After Time" | Cyndi Lauper | |
| June 23 | "Believe in Me" | Dan Fogelberg | |
| June 30 | "Almost Paradise" | Mike Reno and Ann Wilson | |
| July 7 | "If Ever You're in My Arms Again" | Peabo Bryson | |
| July 14 | "If Ever You're in My Arms Again" | Peabo Bryson | |
| July 21 | "If Ever You're in My Arms Again" | Peabo Bryson | |
| July 28 | "If Ever You're in My Arms Again" | Peabo Bryson | |
| August 4 | "Stuck on You" | Lionel Richie | |
| August 11 | "Stuck on You" | Lionel Richie | |
| August 18 | "Stuck on You" | Lionel Richie | |
| August 25 | "Stuck on You" | Lionel Richie | |
| September 1 | "Stuck on You" | Lionel Richie | |
| September 8 | "Leave a Tender Moment Alone" | Billy Joel | |
| September 15 | "Leave a Tender Moment Alone" | Billy Joel | |
| September 22 | "Drive" | The Cars | |
| September 29 | "Drive" | The Cars | |
| October 6 | "Drive" | The Cars | |
| October 13 | "I Just Called to Say I Love You" | Stevie Wonder | |
| October 20 | "I Just Called to Say I Love You" | Stevie Wonder | |
| October 27 | "I Just Called to Say I Love You" | Stevie Wonder | |
| November 3 | "What About Me?" | Kenny Rogers, Kim Carnes and James Ingram | |
| November 10 | "What About Me?" | Kenny Rogers, Kim Carnes and James Ingram | |
| November 17 | "Penny Lover" | Lionel Richie | |
| November 24 | "Penny Lover" | Lionel Richie | |
| December 1 | "Penny Lover" | Lionel Richie | |
| December 8 | "Penny Lover" | Lionel Richie | |
| December 15 | "Sea of Love" | The Honeydrippers | |
| December 22 | "Do What You Do" | Jermaine Jackson | |
| December 29 | "Do What You Do" | Jermaine Jackson | |
