= Movin' Out (Anthony's Song) =

1977 single by Billy Joel

- Side-A label of U.S. vinyl single

Single by Billy Joel

from the album The Stranger
- B-side: “She's Always a Woman" (Europe); "Vienna" (UK); "Everybody has a Dream" (US)
- Released: September 1977
- Recorded: 1977
- Genre: Pop rock
- Length: 3:30
- Label: Columbia
- Songwriter: Billy Joel
- Producer: Phil Ramone

Billy Joel singles chronology
"Just the Way You Are" (1977)	"Movin' Out (Anthony's Song)" (1977)	"Only the Good Die Young" (1977)

Music video
- "Movin' Out (Anthony's Song)" on YouTube

"Movin' Out (Anthony's Song)" is a song written and recorded by Billy Joel, featured on his 1977 album The Stranger as the opening track.

The song critiques the ambitions of working- and lower-middle-class New Yorkers who strive for material success as evidence of social mobility, working long hours to afford the outward signs of having "made it". Joel describes characters with blue-collar occupations attempting to distance themselves from their working-class roots by acquiring status symbols, such as upgrading from a Chevy to a Cadillac or purchasing a home in Hackensack, New Jersey. He implies these efforts are ultimately futile. According to Joel, Anthony is not a real person, but rather "every Irish, Polish, and Italian kid trying to make a living in the US".

The recording concludes with the sound effect of a car, bass player Doug Stegmeyer's 1960s Corvette, starting and driving away, symbolizing departure.

Live performances of the song can be heard on 2000 Years: The Millennium Concert and 12 Gardens Live and Old Grey Whistle Test (video).

== Reception ==
Billboard described "Movin' Out" as an "upbeat narrative that is sort of a commentary on upward mobility". Cash Box said that "growling cellos and a pulsating rhythm section set the mood for Joel's threatening indictment of middle-class values" and that it has "one of the best choruses he has written in some time, combined with unusual echo effects, a yapping horn section, and a melodic guitar finale that wraps it all up nicely." Record World said it is "a typically expressive Joel song, with New York City references and an unusual, piano-dominated structure."

== Versions ==
The 45 rpm single slightly differs from the album version as the sound effects of the car near the end of the song were removed. The single was originally released in autumn of 1977, but was pulled when Joel's next single ("Just the Way You Are") started climbing the charts. It was re-released in March 1978.

In 2017, the song was covered by the pop rock band (then-solo project fronted by Brendon Urie) Panic! at the Disco as part of the touring concert performance during the Death of a Bachelor Tour. This rendition is included in the live album All My Friends We're Glorious released in December 2017.

== Personnel ==
- Billy Joel – lead and backing vocals, piano
- Steve Khan and Hiram Bullock – electric guitars
- Richie Cannata – saxophones
- Doug Stegmeyer – bass guitar, car
- Liberty DeVitto – drums

== Broadway musical ==
The Twyla Tharp Broadway dance musical Movin' Out, featuring the songs of Billy Joel, opened at the Richard Rodgers Theatre in New York City on October 24, 2002, and played 1,307 performances before closing in December 2005. The show's lead piano player and singer was Michael Cavanaugh. It toured the US extensively from 2004 to 2007, with Darren Holden as lead Piano Man, and Matt Wilson, James Fox and Matthew Friedman as second Piano Men. The show transferred to the Apollo Victoria Theatre in the West End of London on April 10, 2006; James Fox played lead piano and sang, with Darren Reeves as second Piano Man. It closed early, on May 22, owing to poor ticket sales.

Movin' Out is also the title of the original Broadway cast album taken from the musical.

== Track listing ==
US-Columbia-ZSS 164108

1. "Movin' Out (Anthony's Song)" – 3:30
2. "Everybody Has A Dream" – 4:36

UK-Columbia-CBS 6412

1. "Movin' Out (Anthony's Song)" – 3:30
2. "Vienna" – 3:32

== Charts ==
=== Weekly charts ===
Chart (1977–1978)	Peak position
Australia (Kent Music Report)	99
Canada RPM Top Singles	11
Canada Adult Contemporary (RPM)	6
Israel (IBA)	6
New Zealand	31
UK Singles (Official Charts)	35
UK Airplay (Radio & Record News)	2
US Billboard Hot 100	17
US Cashbox Top 100	14
US Adult Contemporary (Billboard)	40

=== Year-end charts ===
Chart (1978)	Rank
Canada RPM Top Singles	106
U.S. (Joel Whitburn's Pop Annual)	118

== Certifications ==
Region	Certification	Certified units/sales
New Zealand (RMNZ)	Gold	15,000^{‡}
United Kingdom (BPI)	Silver	200,000^{‡}
United States (RIAA)	2× Platinum	2,000,000^{‡}
^{‡} Sales+streaming figures based on certification alone.
