= Keeping the Faith (song) =

Single by Billy Joel

from the album An Innocent Man
- B-side: "She's Right on Time"
- Released: January 1985
- Recorded: 1983
- Genre: Pop; soul
- Length: 4:41
- Label: Columbia
- Songwriter: Billy Joel
- Producer: Phil Ramone

Billy Joel singles chronology
"This Night" (1984)	"Keeping the Faith" (1985)	"You're Only Human (Second Wind)" (1985)

Music video
- "Keeping the Faith" on YouTube

"Keeping the Faith" is a song by American singer-songwriter Billy Joel from his 1983 album An Innocent Man. The song serves both as its closing track and the final single released from the album. The cover for the single shows an image of Joel and the judge (character actor Richard Shull) in the "jukebox" courtroom from the video.

It reached No. 18 on the main US Billboard Hot 100 chart and No. 3 on the US Billboard Adult Contemporary chart. The song was not released as a single in the UK.

== Background ==
It is an autobiographical song about Joel's teenage years, with him reminiscing about the 1950s and 1960s lifestyle. Joel told SiriusXM in 2016 that this song was kind of his way of explaining. Joel said that he did the song because he "owe[s] a great debt to that time in his life" and "to the wild guys he used to hang out with and the old rock and roll" that really inspired him.

== Reception ==
Cash Box said that the song is "Joel at his melodic and lyric best, representing pure American pop music."

== Music video ==
The music video for the song depicts a court trial to determine whether Joel is innocent and is "keeping the faith" (as the song "An Innocent Man" plays in the background).

Richard Pryor makes a cameo appearance at the beginning of the video, standing at the bottom of the courthouse steps, reading a newspaper with the headline "Billy Joel: Guilty or Innocent?". The courtroom audience is populated by 1950s acts on one side, and 1960s acts (including a Jimi Hendrix lookalike) on the other, and shows Joel singing and dancing throughout the video.

Joel's wife-to-be Christie Brinkley appears in the video as the "red haired girl in a Chevrolet". At the end, Joe Piscopo makes a cameo, reading a newspaper with the headline "Billy Joel: An Innocent Man!", and after giving a one hundred dollar tip, quips to a shoeshine boy, "Keep the faith, kid."

== Chart positions ==
Chart (1984–1985)	Peak position
Canada Top Singles (RPM)	81
Israel (IBA)	35
New Zealand (Recorded Music NZ)	38
Spain Airplay (Top 40 Radio)	37
US Billboard Hot 100	18
US Adult Contemporary (Billboard)	3

== Track listing ==
The song was remixed for release as a 7" vinyl single. An extended remix was also released on US promotional 12" vinyl singles (Columbia AS 1982). Both 7" and 12" releases state "Special Mix" on the label and both have a printed run time of 4:44.

The actual run times for the 7" and 12" are 4:52 and 5:27, respectively. The 7" remix has not been issued on CD. A 4:50 version of the 12" remix was released on the My Lives box set.
