= Richard B. Shull =

American actor (1929–1999)

- Shull in Holmes & Yoyo, 1977
- Born: Richard Bruce Shull; February 24, 1929; Evanston, Illinois, U.S.
- Died: October 14, 1999 (aged 70); New York City, New York, U.S.
- Occupation: Actor
- Years active: 1965–1999
- Spouses: Margaret Ann Haddy (m. 1951; div. 1956); Peggy Joan Barringer (m. 1957; div. 1967); Marilyn Sandra Swartz (m. 1957; div. 1967) (m. 1969; died 1985); Deborah Thomas (m. 1998)

Richard Bruce Shull (February 24, 1929 – October 14, 1999) was an American character actor.

== Biography ==
=== Early life ===
Shull was born in Evanston, Illinois, the son of Zana Marie (née Brown), a court stenographer, and Ulysses Homer Shull, a manufacturing executive. He attended York High School (Elmhurst, Illinois) and the University of Iowa. He served in the U.S. Army before starting his Broadway career as a stage manager.

=== Acting career ===
He got his first big break as an actor when he was cast in Minnie's Boys in 1970. Additional theatre credits include Goodtime Charley (in which he sang a duet "Merci, Bon Dieu"; and for which he received Tony and Drama Desk Award nominations), Fools, The Front Page, A Flea in Her Ear, and Victor/Victoria.

Shull's screen credits include thirty movies, The Anderson Tapes (1971), Klute (1971), Slither (1973), The Fortune (1975), Splash (1984), Garbo Talks (1984), Unfaithfully Yours (1984), Housesitter (1992) and Private Parts (1997).

His television appearances included Love, American Style in episode "Love and the Locksmith", Ironside "Once More for Joey" aired 1974, Good Times "The Visitor", The Rockford Files "The Great Blue Lake", Alice "Flo's Chili Reception", where he played Mel's rival restaurant owner Barney of Barney's Burger Barn; Diana co star, Lou Grant episode "Samaratan", Hart to Hart, and Holmes & Yoyo starred as a police detective, as well as numerous television movies. He also appeared as the judge in a music video for the song "Keeping the Faith" (1984), by Billy Joel. He appeared as the delivery man in Tales from the Darkside Do Not Open This Box (1988) series 4, episode 15. In 1963 Richard became a member of the historical theater club, The Lambs, served on its council and remained a member until his death.

=== Writing career ===
As a writer, Shull wrote the 1960 play Fenton's Folly, which was adapted as Fentons völlig verrückte Erfindung (1967), an independent German movie filmed in Austria. Shull also wrote the story for the 1966 thriller movie Aroused, and co-authored, with William L. Rose, the dramatic film Pamela, Pamela You are... (1968).

=== Death ===
On October 14, 1999, Shull died of a heart attack at his home in New York City; he was 70 years old. He had been appearing in the play Epic Proportions on Broadway. He was buried at Kensico Cemetery in Valhalla Westchester County, New York.

== Hobbies and interests ==
In a 2012 interview, Shull's Holmes & Yoyo co-star John Schuck remembered him as "a very funny actor and a unique man", adding that Shull "lived in the ’40s. He bought ’40s clothing, he only used pen and ink, he had his own railroad car which he would attach to trains and travel around the country. He had a 1949 Chevrolet car. I mean, he truly lived in the past. Quite remarkable." In 1995, Shull co-founded the North American Araucanian Royalist Society (NAARS) with Daniel Paul Morrison. The NAARS studies the Kingdom of Araucania and Patagonia which was founded in 1860 by the Mapuche people of South America. The NAARS devoted a large portion of issue number 10 of their official journal, The Steel Crown, to the life of Shull.

Shull was an invested member of The Baker Street Irregulars, the literary society dedicated to Sherlock Holmes. He received his investiture "An Actor, and a Rare One", in 1986.

Shull was a member of the New York City arts club The Players and the Sons of the Revolution in the State of New York.

== Filmography ==
Films
Year	Title	Role	Notes
1965	Watch the Birdie	Cullen Lauterbach	
1968	Cargo of Love	Dr. Everett	Uncredited
1969	Decameron '69	Roxanne's lover	Uncredited
1971	B.S. I Love You	Mr. Harris	As an executive
1971	The Anderson Tapes	Werner	Long scene with Dyan Cannon and Sean Connery
1971	Klute	Sugarman	Short scene as a policeman
1971	Made for Each Other	Unnamed character	Credit: "and Richard B. Shull"
1971	Such Good Friends	Clarence Fitch	Long scene
1972	Hail to the Chief	Secretary of Health	Leading role
1973	Slither	Harry Moss	Co-starring as an embezzler
1973	Sssssss	Dr. Ken Daniels	
1974	Cockfighter	Omar Baradansky	Leading role as a business partner
1975	The Fortune	Chief Detective Sergeant Jack Power	
1975	Hearts of the West	Stout Crook	Co-starring with Jeff Bridges
1975	The Black Bird	Vernon Prizer	
1976	The Big Bus	Emery Bush	As a dying tourist
1977	The Pack	Hardiman	Co-starring role
1979	Dreamer	George Taylor	The boss
1980	Wholly Moses!	Jethro	Moses' father-in-law
1981	Heartbeeps	Factory Boss	
1983	Lovesick	Dr. Fessner	Minor role
1983	Spring Break	Eddie	Comic supporting role
1984	Unfaithfully Yours	Jess Keller	
1984	Splash	Dr. Ross	
1984	Garbo Talks	Shepard Platkin	As the boss
1984	"Keeping the Faith"	Judge	Billy Joel music video
1986	Seize the Day	Rojox	Robin Williams' boss
1990	Tune in Tomorrow	Leonard Pando	
1992	Housesitter	Ralph / Bernie Duncle	Comic supporting role as Goldie Hawn's father
1994	Trapped in Paradise	Father Ritter	Short scene
1995	Cafe Society	Samuel Segal	Key role
1997	Private Parts	Symphony Sid	Short scene as the boss
2000	Two Family House	Mr. Barrancaccio	As a banker in three scenes, (posthumously released), (final film role)
