= The Night Is Still Young (Billy Joel song) =

Single by Billy Joel

from the album Greatest Hits – Volume I & Volume II
- B-side: "Summer, Highland Falls"
- Released: September 1985
- Recorded: 1985
- Length: 5:27 (album version); 4:08 (single version)
- Label: Columbia
- Songwriter: Billy Joel
- Producer: Phil Ramone

Billy Joel singles chronology
"You're Only Human (Second Wind)" (1985)	"The Night Is Still Young" (1985)	"Modern Woman" (1986)

"The Night Is Still Young" is a 1985 song by Billy Joel, released as the second single from his compilation album Greatest Hits – Volume I & Volume II. It is the second of two new songs on the album, the first being "You're Only Human (Second Wind)." The song peaked at number 34 on the Billboard Hot 100 and found better success on the Adult Contemporary chart, peaking at number 13. A live version of the song appears on 12 Gardens Live.

== Reception ==
Cash Box said it has "an aurally impressive arrangement and a triumphant chorus hook." Billboard said it has a "brooding atmosphere and offbeat structure" that makes it different from many of Joel's other hits.

== Music video ==
The music video was directed by Neil Tardio, it mainly features the story of a man who has gone on a business trip, leaving his wife behind. This correlates with the song's lyrics, which speak of a man whose priorities are shifting away from his musical career and toward marriage and family.

== Personnel ==
- Billy Joel – lead vocals, keyboards, harmonica
- John McCurry – guitar
- Doug Stegmeyer – bass guitar
- Liberty DeVitto – drums
- Jimmy Bralower – percussion
- David Lebolt – synthesizers

== Charts ==
Chart (1985)	Peak position
Australia (Kent Music Report)	82
Canada Top Singles (RPM)	48
US Billboard Hot 100	34
US Adult Contemporary (Billboard)	13
