= The Stranger (album) =

Studio album by Billy Joel
- Released: September 29, 1977
- Recorded: July – August 1977
- Studios: A&R, New York City
- Genres: Rock; soft rock; pop rock
- Length: 42:34
- Label: Columbia
- Producer: Phil Ramone

Billy Joel chronology
Turnstiles (1976)	The Stranger (1977)	52nd Street (1978)

Singles from The Stranger
- 1. "Movin' Out (Anthony's Song)" Released: September 1977; 2. "Just the Way You Are" Released: November 1977; 3. "She's Always a Woman" Released: April 1978 (UK); 4. "The Stranger" Released: May 1978 (Aus.); 5. "Only the Good Die Young" Released: May 1978

The Stranger is the fifth studio album by American singer-songwriter Billy Joel, released on September 29, 1977, by Columbia Records. It was the first of Joel's albums to be produced by Phil Ramone, with whom he would work for five subsequent albums.

Joel's previous album, Turnstiles (1976), had sold modestly, and peaked at only #122 on the US Billboard 200 charts, prompting Columbia to consider dropping him if his next release sold poorly. Joel wanted the new album to feature his touring band, formed during the production of Turnstiles. The band consisted of drummer Liberty DeVitto, bassist Doug Stegmeyer, and multi-instrumentalist Richie Cannata, who played the saxophone and organ. Seeking out a new producer, he first turned to veteran Beatles producer George Martin before coming across and settling on Ramone, whose name he had seen on albums by other artists such as Paul Simon. Recording took place over three weeks, featuring DeVitto, Stegmeyer, and Cannata. Other studio musicians filled in as guitarists on various songs.

The Stranger spent six weeks at No. 2 on the US Billboard 200 chart. Four singles were released in the US, all of which became Top 40 hits on the Billboard Hot 100 chart: "Just the Way You Are" (No. 3), "Movin' Out (Anthony's Song)", "She's Always a Woman" (both No. 17), and "Only the Good Die Young" (No. 24). Other songs, such as "Scenes from an Italian Restaurant" and "Vienna", have become staples of his career and are frequently performed in his live shows. The album won two awards at the 21st Annual Grammy Awards in 1979: Record of the Year and Song of the Year for "Just the Way You Are". It remains his best-selling non-compilation album to date and surpassed Simon & Garfunkel's Bridge over Troubled Water (1970) to become Columbia's best-selling album release, with more than 10 million units sold worldwide. Rolling Stone magazine ranked the album number 70 on its 2003 list of the "500 Greatest Albums of All Time", repositioned to number 169 in a 2020 revision. In 2008, The Stranger was inducted into the Grammy Hall of Fame.

== Background ==
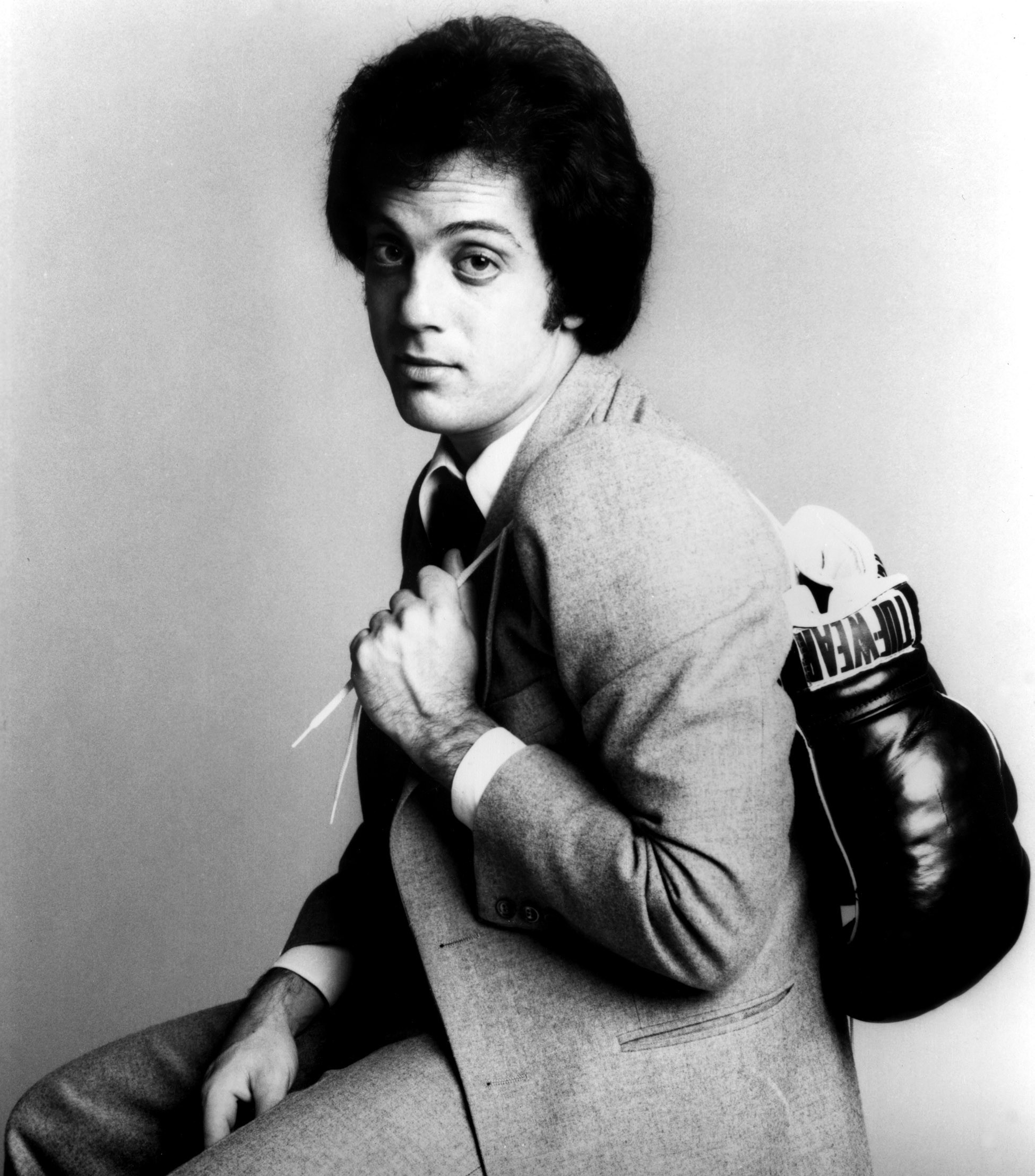
Joel in a promotional photo for The Stranger

Before The Stranger, Billy Joel was on the verge of being dropped by his record label Columbia Records. After the unexpected success of Joel's second album, Piano Man (1973), his subsequent albums were commercially disappointing. Turnstiles, Joel's 1976 release, had peaked at only number 122 on the Billboard 200 chart.

By 1976, Joel had formed a reliable touring band, consisting of Doug Stegmeyer on bass, Liberty DeVitto on drums and Richie Cannata on saxophone, flute, clarinet and organ. Joel grew to appreciate this group of musicians, finding that they had a high-energy, rough-around-the-edges feel that he hoped to capture in his studio recordings. Joel had mostly worked with session players for his first three studio albums, which contained only scattered contributions from his own backup musicians, and strongly disliked the polished sound of these albums. During the production of Turnstiles, his fourth album, Joel initially worked with veteran producer Jim Guercio, who had him work with bassist Dee Murray and drummer Nigel Olsson, who were both former members of Elton John's band. Dissatisfied with the results, Joel instead opted to self-produce the album and record with his own touring band. Joel was likewise set on recording his fifth studio album with this band. Having written some new material for the record, Joel sought a producer who could cultivate his desired style. Joel, a longtime fan of the Beatles, initially looked to famed Beatles producer George Martin. But after meeting with Joel, Martin expressed interest in producing the album, but did not want to use Joel's band, wishing instead to bring in session players. Joel, however, was adamant in his desire to record with his own band and declined Martin's offer. Ultimately, Joel turned to Phil Ramone, a veteran New York City sound engineer and record producer who had recently worked with Paul Simon, another singer-songwriter, on Simon's album Still Crazy After All These Years (1975). According to Joel, he and Ramone met with each other at Fontana di Trevi, an Italian restaurant near Carnegie Hall, where Joel had been playing at the time. The restaurant would go on to inspire the setting of "Scenes from an Italian Restaurant", a song on The Stranger. According to Joel, Ramone expressed an appreciation for Joel's band and their energy, and understood the reasoning behind Joel's attitude towards recording, which ultimately led Joel to choose Ramone as the producer for his next album.

== Production and recording ==
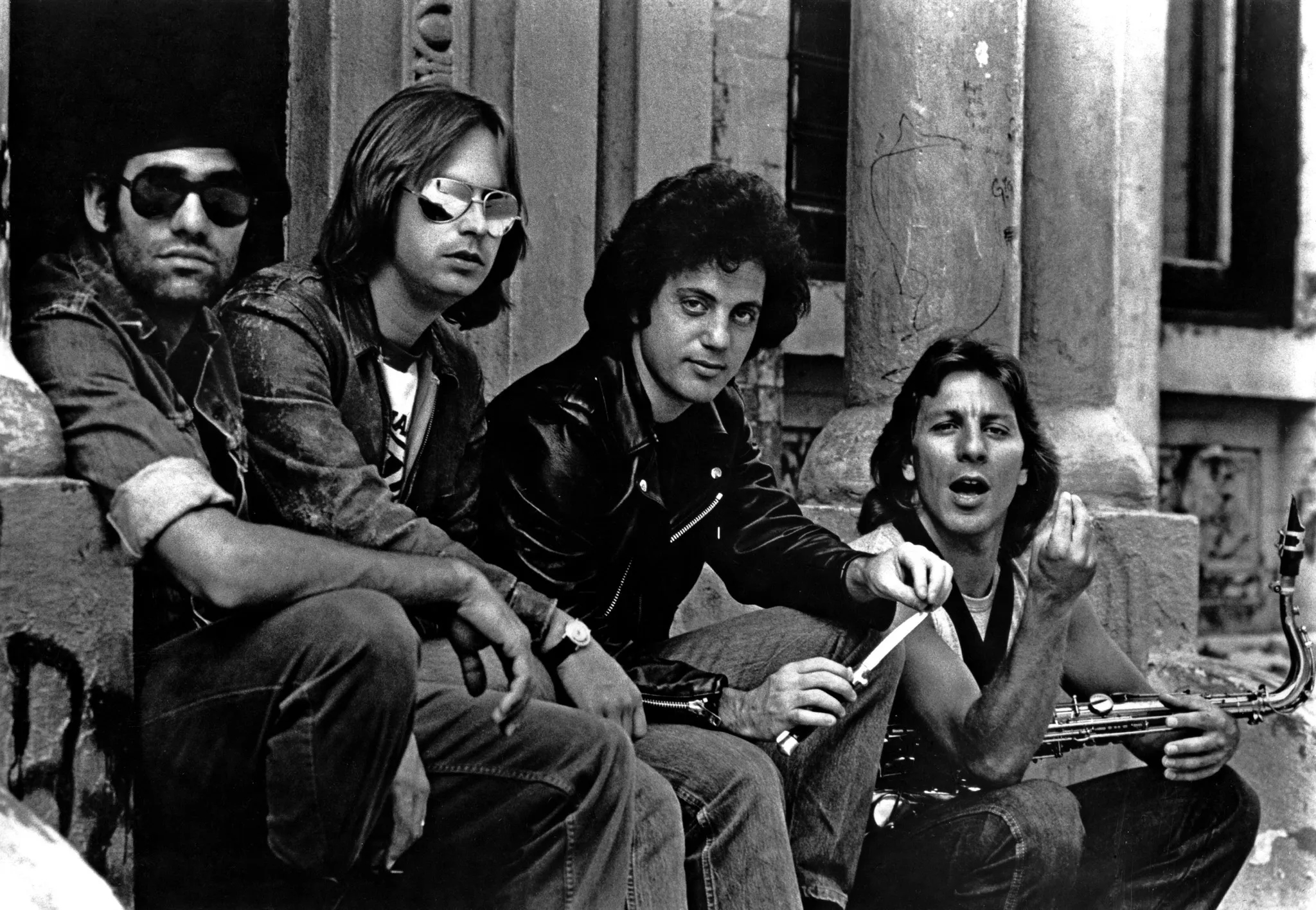
Joel and his backing band in 1978. From left: DeVitto, Stegmeyer, Joel and Cannata

The recording sessions for The Stranger, described by Joel as "a blast" to be a part of, took place across the span of three weeks in between July and August 1977. The album contains nine songs, four of which were released as singles in North America. The songs were all recorded with Joel alongside his band, which he had formed while touring, in addition to various other musicians who were brought into the studio for specific songs. Despite the formation of Joel's band, the songs on The Stranger didn't feature any consistent guitarists, with different players instead featuring in each song, and according to Joel, the reason for the initial lack of a constant guitarist was because it was hard to find the right one. The photograph on the back cover of the album, featuring Joel, Ramone (donning a Yankees shirt at the time of the picture) and each of the band members, was taken at the Supreme Macaroni Company, one of several restaurants where the group would go to "have these crazy lunches and dinners".

The opening song, "Movin' Out (Anthony's Song)", centers around Anthony, a grocery-store employee from Long Island who "dreams of making it big", receiving pressure from his family to move out and go his own way. Joel stated in a Q&A session that he initially wrote the song's lyrics to the tune of the song "Laughter in the Rain" by Neil Sedaka, doing so without even realizing the similarity until it was brashly pointed out the next day by drummer Liberty DeVitto. Not wanting to waste all of the words he had come up with, Joel rewrote the song, coming up with a new melody that fit with the lyrics. The album's title track, according to Joel, was written by him without any core themes in mind and could be open up to interpretation, though he stated that it could be seen as a song about a man with schizophrenia. While composing the song, Joel whistled the track's signature theme for Ramone, claiming that he (Joel) needed to find an instrument to play it. Ramone told Joel that the whistling he did was perfect, and thus it was kept in the final recording. According to Joel in an interview with Today, the percussive rhythm used in the song came about while he was toying around with an Ace Tone Rhythm Ace drum machine, which contained a drum beat that he heard while scrolling through the machine's library of rhythm tracks. After hearing the beat, he thought that the rhythm would be nice to fool around with, and wrote the song shortly afterwards. "Just the Way You Are" was inspired by Joel's love for his wife at the time, Elizabeth Weber. He stated on a SiriusXM broadcast in 2016 that the melody came to him in a dream while he was working on The Stranger. He forgot about the melody shortly afterwards, but it came back to him while he was in a business meeting. Joel originally considered keeping the song off the album, as he dismissed it as a "gloopy ballad" that was out-of-place compared to the rest of the album. Ramone disagreed, and brought Linda Ronstadt and Phoebe Snow into the studio to prove that it was worth including. Upon hearing the song, the two artists both praised it, thus convincing him to feature the song. The 7 1/2 minute epic "Scenes from an Italian Restaurant", which follows a pair of young lovers from Long Island named Brenda and Eddie who go through a failed marriage, is three different, shorter songs: "The Italian Restaurant Song", "Things Are OK in Oyster Bay" and "The Ballad of Brenda and Eddie". Joel stitched the three songs together, inspired by the similar approach taken with side two of the Beatles' Abbey Road and by Freddie Mercury and Queen with "Bohemian Rhapsody", while Ramone helped intertwine them with backing orchestration.

The song "Vienna", which opens Side 2 of the album, was inspired by a trip Joel took to Vienna, Austria, to visit his father a few years after starting his music career. While there, he found that Austrians had a vastly different outlook on life than the one he was familiar with in America. As he recalls, Joel had this realization after taking notice of an old woman sweeping out on the city streets, telling his father that he pitied the woman for having to do such a menial and unimportant task; Joel's father responded by explaining that the woman was giving herself a sense of worth by doing a service that helped everyone rather than "sitting at home wasting away". Joel tried to make the song feel Viennese in nature and compared it to the work of Bertolt Brecht and Kurt Weill, specifically The Threepenny Opera. "Only the Good Die Young", which is sung from the point-of-view of a boy trying to appeal to an abstinent Catholic woman, was inspired by a girl named Virginia Davis, on whom Joel had a crush in high school. According to Joel, he saw Davis looking at him while he was playing in his high school band, The Echoes, which was the event that had him "completely hooked" to the prospect of being a musician. "Only the Good Die Young" was written by Joel while opening for the Beach Boys in Knoxville, Tennessee, at which point it sounded slower-pace and more akin to a reggae tune, with Joel even singing the song's lyrics in a Jamaican accent. The mood of the song was shifted at the insistence of drummer Liberty DeVitto, who reportedly said to Joel "Why are you singing like that? The closest you've been to Jamaica was the Long Island Rail Road!" Ramone suggested that the song be played as a straight-four piece while DeVitto played a shuffle beat, a proposition that Joel found he enjoyed the sound of despite the concept initially seeming "odd and clunky". The song featured guitar playing by Hugh McCracken, a famous session player who Ramone brought in. "She's Always a Woman", like "Just the Way You Are", was written about Elizabeth Weber, described by Joel as "a commentary on women in business being persecuted and insulted". Joel tried to stylize the song as one that would be sung by Gordon Lightfoot. "Get It Right the First Time" is inspired by the challenge of first meeting and confronting a person, highlighting the importance of not flubbing such an encounter and "gett[ing] it right the first time". The album's final song, "Everybody Has a Dream", a gospel-influenced piece, was also inspired by Joel's wife. The song closes the album out with a reprise of the whistled theme from "The Stranger".

== Commercial performance ==
Spending a total of 17 weeks in varying positions within the top 10 of the Billboard 200 chart, The Stranger first entered the bottom position on January 21, 1978, approximately four months after its initial release. A month later, on February 18, the album reached its peak position at number 2 on the chart and remained there for six more weeks. The second single from the album, "Just The Way You Are", peaked at number 3 on the Billboard Hot 100 chart, having received a boost in popularity following Joel's performance of the song on the February 18, 1978, telecast of Saturday Night Live. The other three singles were all top 40 hits, with "Movin' Out (Anthony's Song)" and "She's Always a Woman" both peaking at number 17. While "Movin' Out (Anthony's Song)" was the first single released for the album, radio stations put little attention toward it, instead expressing interest in "Just the Way You Are"; thus, the latter song was released just six weeks following the debut of "Movin' Out", after which it achieved far larger success. The single for "Movin' Out" was later rereleased, after which it achieved higher success and ultimately became a hit. According to Joel, "Only the Good Die Young" sold poorly when it was first put out as a single; however, following the song's release, Christian groups and archdiocese areas began calling for the song to be banned on several radio stations across the nation. The controversy helped raise the song's popularity, particularly among rebellious youth according to Joel, and the single thus fared much better as a result, ultimately peaking at number 24 in the US singles chart. The Stranger remains one of Joel's best-selling original studio albums to date, receiving a Diamond certification from the Recording Industry Association of America (RIAA) for surpassing sales of 10 million units. At the time, it had surpassed Simon & Garfunkel's Bridge over Troubled Water to become Columbia Records’ best-selling album release. In Canada the album spent 72 weeks in the Top 100 Album charts between November 1977 and April 1979.

== Reception ==
Retrospective professional ratings
Review scores
Source	Rating
AllMusic	4.5/5 stars
American Songwriter	4/5 stars
Blender	5/5 stars
The Buffalo News	4/4 stars
Pitchfork	8.5/10
Record Collector	4/5 stars
Rolling Stone	4/5 stars
The Rolling Stone Album Guide	4/5 stars
Slant Magazine	4/5 stars
Uncut	4/5 stars

The Stranger was well received by critics, particularly in retrospect, with many considering it to contain some of Joel's best-written material. In a contemporary review of the album, Ira Mayer of Rolling Stone deemed it an improvement over Joel's previous studio efforts, praising its musical variety and Ramone's production. In a less enthusiastic review, Village Voice critic Robert Christgau graded the album "B−" and held it slightly above Joel's previous works; speaking specifically of Joel himself, he wrote that the artist had "more or less grown up" with what he considered less egotistical songwriting, and that he is "now as likeable as your once-rebellious and still-tolerant uncle who has the quirk of believing that OPEC was designed to ruin his air-conditioning business".

Retrospectively, Sal Cinquemani of Slant Magazine described The Stranger as "a concept album of sorts, an ode to the singer's native New York underscored by his paranoid obsession (and resistance) to change". He called the album "a rejection of the American Dream", highlighting the pessimism expressed in some of its songs' lyrics. Stephen Thomas Erlewine of AllMusic praised The Stranger as a highlight of Joel's discography, noting that its lyrical shortcomings are outweighed by Joel's musical flair, and ultimately concluding that Joel "rarely wrote a set of songs better than those on The Stranger, nor did he often deliver an album as consistently listenable". Rolling Stone ranked The Stranger at number 67 on its 2003 list of the 500 greatest albums of all time. It also placed on the 2012 and 2020 editions of the list at numbers 70 and 169, respectively. In 2000, The Stranger was voted number 246 in Colin Larkin's All Time Top 1000 Albums.

As his breakthrough album, The Stranger kicked off a long string of successful albums for Joel, continuing up through 1993's River of Dreams. George Martin, who had initially declined to produce The Stranger using Joel's band, reportedly wrote Joel a letter following the album's massive success, in which he congratulated Joel and reflected that he was wrong about the band. Phil Ramone would continue to serve as Joel's producer for a number of years, working with him on each of his albums up through 1986's The Bridge. "Movin' Out (Anthony's Song)" went on to lend its name to a 2002 jukebox musical, featuring several of Joel's songs alongside narrative choreography by Twyla Tharp. The play ran successfully on Broadway for three years, holding its final performance on December 15, 2005, after a total of 1,303 performances. In 2017, to celebrate the album's 40th anniversary, a picture-disc vinyl rerelease of The Stranger with newly remastered audio was released by Brookville Records on October 20.

Many of the songs from the album went on to become staples in Joel's repertoire. Though never released as a single, "Scenes from an Italian Restaurant" is a staple of his live set, named by Rolling Stone's Rob Sheffield as Joel's equivalent to Bruce Springsteen's "Jungleland". Joel stated in an interview that "I don't think I could do a show without performing that song." "Vienna" has also become a popular part of his live set; when Joel lets the audience choose between it and "Just the Way You Are", "Vienna" is most often the winning contender. The song was featured in an episode of the TV series Taxi, and was prominently showcased later on in the 2004 teenage comedy film 13 Going on 30. Joel has cited "Scenes from an Italian Restaurant" and "Vienna" as his favorite and 5th-favorite songs that he has written, respectively.

== Track listing ==
All tracks are written by Billy Joel.

Side one
No.	Title	Length
1.	"Movin' Out (Anthony's Song)"	3:30
2.	"The Stranger"	5:10
3.	"Just the Way You Are"	4:52
4.	"Scenes from an Italian Restaurant"	7:37

Side two
No.	Title	Length
5.	"Vienna"	3:34
6.	"Only the Good Die Young"	3:55
7.	"She's Always a Woman"	3:21
8.	"Get It Right the First Time"	3:57
9.	"Everybody Has a Dream"	6:38
Total length:		42:34

A reprise of "The Stranger" plays after "Everybody Has a Dream" at about 4:35.

== Personnel ==
=== Musicians ===
- Billy Joel – vocals, acoustic piano, Fender Rhodes piano, keyboards, synthesizers
- Doug Stegmeyer – bass guitar, car (1)
- Liberty DeVitto – drums
- Richie Cannata – tenor saxophone, soprano saxophone, clarinet, flute, tuba, organ
- Steve Khan – 6 and 12-string electric guitars, acoustic rhythm guitar, high-string guitar
- Hiram Bullock – electric guitar
- Patrick Williams – orchestration

==== Additional musicians ====
- Ralph MacDonald – percussion (2, 3, 8, 9)
- Phil Woods – alto saxophone (3)
- Hugh McCracken – acoustic guitar (3, 4, 7–9)
- Steve Burgh – acoustic guitar (3, 7), electric guitar (4)
- Dominic Cortese – accordion (4, 5)
- Richard Tee – organ (9)
- Phoebe Snow – backing vocals (9)
- Lani Groves – backing vocals (9)
- Gwen Guthrie – backing vocals (9)
- Patti Austin – backing vocals (9)

=== Technical ===
- Produced by Phil Ramone
- Engineered by Jim Boyer and Phil Ramone
- Production associate – Kathy Kurs
- Mastered by Ted Jensen at Sterling Sound (New York, NY)
- Photography – Jim Houghton

== Charts ==
=== Weekly charts ===
Original issue

Chart (1977–1978)	Peak position
Australian Albums (Kent Music Report)	2
Canadian Albums (RPM)	2
Dutch Albums (MegaCharts)	36
French Albums (SNEP)	15
Icelandic Albums (Tónlist)	3
Italian Albums (Musica e Dischi)	21
Japanese Albums (Oricon)	3
New Zealand Albums (RIANZ)	2
UK Albums (OCC)	24
US Billboard 200	2
Zimbabwean Albums (ZIMA)	5

2008 reissue

Chart (2008)	Position
Japanese Albums (Oricon)	28

Chart (2026)	Position
Belgian Albums (Ultratop Flanders)	189

=== Year-end charts ===
Chart (1978)	Position
Australian Albums Chart	5
Canadian Albums Chart	2
Japanese Albums Chart	12
New Zealand Albums Chart	4
US Billboard 200	4

Chart (1979)	Position
New Zealand Albums Chart	48
US Billboard 200	18

== Certifications ==
Region	Certification	Certified units/sales
Australia (ARIA)	Platinum	50,000^{^}
Canada (Music Canada)	5× Platinum	500,000^{^}
Denmark (IFPI Danmark)	Gold	10,000^{‡}
France	—	75,000
Hong Kong (IFPI Hong Kong)	Platinum	20,000^{*}
Japan (RIAJ)	Gold	377,000
New Zealand (RMNZ)	4× Platinum	60,000^{‡}
United Kingdom (BPI)	Gold	100,000^{^}
United States (RIAA)	12× Platinum	12,000,000^{‡}
^{*} Sales figures based on certification alone.^{^} Shipments figures based on certification alone.^{‡} Sales+streaming figures based on certification alone.

== Accolades ==
Grammy Awards

Year	Winner	Category
1978	"Just the Way You Are"	Record of the Year
1978	"Just the Way You Are"	Song of the Year

== Release history ==
Media	Release date	Publisher	Catalog number
Vinyl LP	09/1977	Columbia	JC 34987
Vinyl LP Australian release	1977	Columbia (CBS Inc.)	SBP 237057
CD 1st Issue Japan	October 1, 1982	CBS/Sony	35DP 2
Cassette	10/1990	Columbia	JCT 34987
CD	1990	Columbia	CK 34987
CD Remastered	October 20, 1998	Columbia	CK 69384
Super Audio CD	July 31, 2001	Columbia	CS 69384
2CD Legacy Edition	07/08/08	Columbia/Legacy	88697 22581 2
2CD/DVD 30th Anniversary Edition	07/08/08	Columbia/Legacy	88697 30801 2
SACD Remastered	2012	Mobile Fidelity Sound Lab	UDSACD 2089

== See also ==
- List of best-selling albums in the United States
