= You're Only Human (Second Wind) =

Single by Billy Joel

from the album Greatest Hits – Volume I & Volume II
- B-side: "Surprises"
- Released: June 1985
- Recorded: 1985
- Genre: Synth-pop; R&B
- Length: 4:48 (album version); 4:21 (single version)
- Label: Columbia
- Songwriter: Billy Joel
- Producer: Phil Ramone

Billy Joel singles chronology
"Keeping the Faith" (1985)	"You're Only Human (Second Wind)" (1985)	"The Night Is Still Young" (1985)

"You're Only Human (Second Wind)" is a song written and performed by Billy Joel that originally appeared on Greatest Hits – Volume I & Volume II in 1985. The song deals with teenage depression and suicide. It became a top-ten hit, peaking at No.6 on the Kent Music Report, No. 9 on the Billboard Hot 100, and No.2 on the Billboard Adult Contemporary chart.

== Background and recording ==
Joel, who said he once attempted suicide himself, stated in a 1985 interview that he wrote the song as a way to help young people struggling with depression and suicidal thoughts. In its original draft, he was concerned the song sounded too depressing so he imbued it with a bouncy, joyous beat and melody, with lyrics emphasizing personal forgiveness and optimism. The song was originally titled simply "Second Wind” but Joel changed it to "You're Only Human" with "Second Wind" as the subtitle after drummer Liberty DeVitto mocked the name. Joel donated all royalties from the song to the National Committee for Youth Suicide Prevention.

During the song, Joel audibly chuckles after briefly hesitating and stuttering during one of the verses. At the prompting of Paul Simon and Christie Brinkley, who was listening in the studio, he left it in the finished recording as it seemed to illustrate the song's point about celebrating personal fallibility.

== Reception ==
Cash Box said that the song has "a lilting reggae rhythm much like that in Julian Lennon's 'Too Late For Goodbyes'" (Phil Ramone produced both songs) and "Joel’s inimitable sense of melodic and musical themes." Billboard said that it has a "syncopated synthesized rhythm."

== Personnel ==
- Billy Joel – lead vocals, keyboards
- David Brown – lead guitar
- Russell Javors – rhythm guitar
- Doug Stegmeyer – bass guitar
- Liberty DeVitto – drums
- Jimmy Bralower – percussion
- Peter Hewlett – background vocals
- Frank Simms – background vocals
- David Lebolt – synthesizer
- Ronnie Cuber – syntharmonicas
- Jon Faddis – syntharmonicas
- Mark Rivera – syntharmonicas
- David Matthews – horns arrangements

== Music video ==
At the beginning of the video, Joel plays "Piano Man" on his harmonica. The entire video pays homage to the film It's a Wonderful Life, as the angelic Joel shows a suicidal young man named George Young, threatening to jump off a bridge because of a break-up with his girlfriend what life will be like without him, as his family and friends mourn his death—as well as showing him the joys in his future he would be missing if he dies (e.g. high school graduation, marriage). The video ends with the young man choosing to live, and reconciling with his girlfriend when Joel plays "Piano Man" once again before tossing him his harmonica.

One of the extras in the music video is Adam Savage, who later found fame as the co-host of the popular science television show MythBusters.

The video was shot on Staten Island and Manhattan and features landmarks such as the 59th Street Bridge and Monsignor Farrell High School.

== Single and album edits ==
The single version is 27 seconds shorter than the album version, removing the saxophone solo between the bridge and the third verse.

== Charts ==
=== Weekly charts ===
Chart (1985)	Peak position
Australia (Kent Music Report)	6
Canada Top Singles (RPM)	15
Israel (IBA)	18
Netherlands (Single Top 100)	22
New Zealand (Recorded Music NZ)	17
Spain Airplay (Top 40 Radio)	25
UK Singles (Official Charts)	94
US Billboard Hot 100	9
US Adult Contemporary (Billboard)	2
US Mainstream Rock (Billboard)	26

=== Year-end charts ===
Year-end chart performance for "You're Only Human (Second Wind)"
Chart (1985)	Position
Australia (Kent Music Report)	59
