= She's Always a Woman =

1977 single by Billy Joel

- A-side label of U.S. vinyl single

Single by Billy Joel

from the album The Stranger
- B-side: "Vienna"
- Released: April 1978
- Studio: A & R Recording Inc. (New York City)
- Genre: Pop rock
- Length: 3:21
- Label: Columbia
- Songwriter: Billy Joel
- Producer: Phil Ramone

Billy Joel singles chronology
| "Only the Good Die Young" (1977) | "She's Always a Woman" (1978) | "The Stranger" (1978) |

"She's Always a Woman" is a song by Billy Joel from his 1977 album, The Stranger. The single peaked at No. 17 on the US Billboard Hot 100 and No. 18 on the US Cash Box Top 100 in 1978 and at No. 53 in the UK in 1986, when it was released as a double A-side with "Just the Way You Are". It re-entered the UK chart in 2010, reaching No. 29.

== Background ==
Joel wrote the song for his then-wife, Elizabeth Weber, who had taken over management of Joel's career, and was able to put his financial affairs in order after Joel had signed some bad deals and contracts. Joel said of the song's depiction of Weber, "Yes, she can be difficult, she can be confounding, she can be impossible, but she's obviously a better businessperson than you are." The two eventually divorced in 1982.

== Composition ==
Joel has said that he was influenced by Gordon Lightfoot and his mellow acoustic guitar ballads. He stated in an interview that he was attempting to replicate the fingerpicking common in folk guitar music. He accomplishes this by playing arpeggiated triads in the right hand. He also notes that the production was purposely minimal to capture the purity of the tune as a folk song.

The meter of the song is 6/8. This splits each measure into two full triad ascending arpeggios. The song is in the key of E♭ major. It begins with singing over the chords each played without the arpeggio in the first verse, each chord lasting a full measure. In the second verse he begins arpeggiating, with each chord again lasting a full measure.

The choruses are in the relative minor of E♭ major, which is C minor. In the second part of each chorus Joel switches to the parallel minor of E♭ minor before returning to verse. The song features mellotron flutes, the only time Joel used this instrument in his career.

== Reception ==
Billboard described "She's Always a Woman" as a "dramatic ballad". Billboard particularly praised the "subtle orchestration" and "sophisticated melody", which it found comparable to ballads by Bob Dylan and Paul Simon. Cash Box said that "the tune is melodic and flows sweetly; the lyric is precise and has something to say" and praised Joel's singing. Record World said that "it is much like a [natural] progression of the message in 'Just the Way You Are' and should pick up immediate pop and adult airplay."

== Track listing ==
7-inch single (1977)

1. "She's Always a Woman"
2. "Vienna"

Single (CBS)

1. "She's Always a Woman"
2. "Movin' Out (Anthony's Song)"

Japanese 7-inch single

1. "She's Always a Woman"
2. "Only the Good Die Young"

== Charts ==
| Chart (1978) | Peak position |
|---|---|
| Belgian Singles Chart (Flanders) | 28 |
| Canada Top Singles (RPM) | 12 |
| Canadian AC Chart | 7 |
| Dutch Top 40 | 15 |
| Israel (IBA) | 33 |
| UK Airplay (Record Business) | 46 |
| US Cash Box Top 100 | 18 |
| US Billboard Hot 100 | 17 |
| US Adult Contemporary (Billboard) | 2 |

| Chart (1986) | Peak position |
|---|---|
| Irish Singles Chart | 22 |
| UK Singles Chart | 53 |

| Chart (2010) | Peak position |
|---|---|
| UK Singles Chart | 29 |

| Chart (2011) | Peak position |
|---|---|
| Austrian Singles Chart | 37 |

== Certifications ==
| Region | Certification | Certified units/sales |
|---|---|---|
| Denmark (IFPI Danmark) | Gold | 45,000^{‡} |
| New Zealand (RMNZ) | 2× Platinum | 60,000^{‡} |
| United Kingdom (BPI) | 2× Platinum | 1,200,000^{‡} |
| United States (RIAA) | 2× Platinum | 2,000,000^{‡} |
^{‡} Sales+streaming figures based on certification alone.

== Fyfe Dangerfield cover ==
"She's Always a Woman"

Single by Fyfe Dangerfield

from the album Fly Yellow Moon
- Released: May 10, 2010
- Length: 3:14
- Label: Fantastic Plastic; Polydor
- Songwriter: Billy Joel
- Producer: Adam Noble

Fyfe Dangerfield singles chronology
| "Faster Than the Setting Sun" (2010) | "She's Always a Woman" (2010) | "Barricades" (2010) |

Fyfe Dangerfield, lead singer of the band Guillemots, recorded a version of this song in 2010 which was used in an advertisement for the British department store John Lewis. Subsequently, the Billy Joel original re-entered the UK Singles Chart at No. 29 on May 1, 2010. On May 1, 2010, a new version of the advert aired; which shows more of the song cover. In the annual ITV poll for 2010 advert of the year; "John Lewis – She's always a Woman" ranked fourth.

The advert has been viewed on YouTube over 570,000 times (collectively from the top 3 results) since it aired on TV.

=== Chart performance ===
"She's Always a Woman" debuted on the UK Singles Chart on May 2, 2010, at No. 99. On its second week in the chart, the single climbed 85 places to No. 14, marking Dangerfield's most successful single to date. On May 16, 2010, the single climbed seven places to its peak of No. 7 before falling to No. 9 in its second week within the top 10.

=== Track listing ===
Digital download

1. "She's Always a Woman" – 3:14

=== Charts ===
==== Weekly charts ====
| Chart (2010) | Peak position |
|---|---|
| Scottish Singles Sales (Official Charts) | 8 |
| UK Singles (Official Charts) | 7 |

==== Year-end charts ====
| Chart (2010) | Position |
|---|---|
| UK Singles (OCC) | 116 |
