= An Innocent Man =

Studio album by Billy Joel
- Released: August 8, 1983
- Recorded: Spring 1983
- Studios: Chelsea Sound, New York City; A&R, New York City
- Genres: Doo-wop; soul; pop; rock and roll
- Length: 40:25
- Label: Family Productions/Columbia
- Producer: Phil Ramone

Billy Joel chronology
The Nylon Curtain (1982)	An Innocent Man (1983)	Greatest Hits – Volume I & Volume II (1985)

Singles from An Innocent Man
- 1. "Tell Her About It" Released: 17 July 1983; 2. "Uptown Girl" Released: September 1983; 3. "This Night" Released: October 1983; 4. "An Innocent Man" Released: December 1983; 5. "The Longest Time" Released: March 1984; 6. "Leave a Tender Moment Alone" Released: June 1984; 7. "Keeping the Faith" Released: January 1985

An Innocent Man is the ninth studio album by American singer-songwriter Billy Joel released on August 8, 1983. The album was influenced by the American popular music of Joel's adolescent years in the late 1950s and early 1960s, including doo-wop and soul music. The album cover artwork was taken on the front steps of 142 Mercer Street, in the SoHo neighborhood of New York City.

Seven songs were released as singles from the album, including three Billboard Top 10 hit singles: "Tell Her About It" (No. 1), "Uptown Girl" (No. 3) and "An Innocent Man" (No. 10).

== Recording ==
At the time that he was recording An Innocent Man, Joel was newly divorced from his first wife, Elizabeth Weber, and was single for the first time since achieving rock star status. He had the opportunity to date supermodels such as Elle Macpherson and Christie Brinkley, and because of these experiences, he said, "I kind of felt like a teenager all over again." Joel started writing songs in the same styles as pop songs that he remembered from his teenage years, citing pop music from the late 1950s and early 1960s, including "early R&B songs and The Four Seasons, and the Motown music, soul music." According to Joel, the various songs were not meant to be autobiographical, and instead center around various made-up characters. "Easy Money" was influenced by James Brown and Wilson Pickett, while "Uptown Girl" was a "homage" to Frankie Valli and The Four Seasons.

Joel explained, "When you're gonna write [songs for a new album], you write what you're feeling. And I didn't fight it. The material was coming so easily and so quickly, and I was having so much fun doing it. I was kind of reliving my youth. ... I think within 6 weeks I had written most of the material on the album." Joel also said that he was pleasantly surprised to have hit records in the 1980s with retro songs like the mostly a cappella doo wop song "The Longest Time". The song "Easy Money", which was made as a tribute to early R&B, was initially written for the 1983 film of the same name starring Rodney Dangerfield and was the song that "kicked off" the creation of An Innocent Man, according to Joel. Dangerfield later made a cameo appearance at the end of the music video for the song "Tell Her About It", as an exchange for Joel's song in support of Dangerfield's movie. The song "Christie Lee" describes a narrative about a saxophone player who has his heart broken by a woman he falls in love with, whom he later realizes is only interested in him for his saxophone skills.

== Chart performance ==
The album featured three Billboard Top 10 hit singles: "Tell Her About It" (No. 1), "Uptown Girl" (No. 3) and "An Innocent Man" (No. 10). Four other singles were released from the album: "The Longest Time" (No. 14), "Leave a Tender Moment Alone" (No. 27), "Keeping the Faith" (No. 18) and "This Night" (US B-side of "Leave a Tender Moment Alone"). "Tell Her About It" and "Uptown Girl" garnered international success—"Uptown Girl" reached No. 1 in the UK, Australia and New Zealand. An Innocent Man remained on the US Pop album chart for 111 weeks, becoming Joel's longest charting studio album behind The Stranger. For over a year, the album remained on the charts in the UK, Japan and Australia.

== Critical reception ==
Professional ratings
Review scores
Source	Rating
AllMusic	4/5 stars
Christgau's Record Guide	B+
Rolling Stone	4/5 stars
The Rolling Stone Album Guide	3.5/5 stars

Like his three previous efforts, Joel's An Innocent Man received a nomination for the 26th Grammy Award for Album of the Year, although the award went to Michael Jackson's Thriller. The album was also nominated for a Grammy for Best Male Pop Vocal Performance for "Uptown Girl", but was beaten by the title track from Thriller.

== Track listing ==
All songs by Billy Joel, except for the chorus for "This Night", which is credited on the sleeve to Joel and L. v. Beethoven.

The track listing on the LP is slightly different from that on the cassette and original CD pressings, with the latter swapping the places of "The Longest Time" and "Uptown Girl". However, on the actual cassette shell and disc label, the songs are listed (and play) in the correct order as printed on the LP.

Side one
No.	Title	Length
1.	"Easy Money"	4:04
2.	"An Innocent Man"	5:17
3.	"The Longest Time"	3:42
4.	"This Night"	4:17
5.	"Tell Her About It"	3:52

Side two
No.	Title	Length
6.	"Uptown Girl"	3:17
7.	"Careless Talk"	3:48
8.	"Christie Lee"	3:31
9.	"Leave a Tender Moment Alone"	3:56
10.	"Keeping the Faith"	4:41
Total length:		40:25

== Personnel ==
=== Musicians ===
- Billy Joel – vocals, Baldwin SF-10 acoustic piano, Fender Rhodes, Hammond B-3
- Liberty DeVitto – drums
- Doug Stegmeyer – bass
- David Brown – electric and acoustic guitar (lead)
- Russell Javors – electric and acoustic guitar (rhythm)
- Mark Rivera – tenor saxophone, alto saxophone (4, 8, 10), percussion, backing vocals

Additional personnel

- Ralph MacDonald – percussion (7, 9)
- Leon Pendarvis – Hammond B-3 (1)
- Richard Tee – acoustic piano (5)
- Eric Gale – electric guitar (1)
- "String Fever" – strings
- Ronnie Cuber – baritone saxophone (1, 5, 7, 10)
- Jon Faddis – trumpet (1)
- David Sanborn – alto saxophone (1)
- Joe Shepley – trumpet (1, 5, 7, 10)
- Michael Brecker – tenor saxophone (5, 7, 10)
- John Gatchell – trumpet (5, 7, 10)
- Toots Thielemans – harmonica (9)
- Tom Bahler – backing vocals, background vocal arrangements
- Rory Dodd – backing vocals
- Frank Floyd – backing vocals
- Lani Groves – backing vocals
- Ullanda McCullough – backing vocals
- Ron Taylor – backing vocals
- Terry Textor – backing vocals
- Eric Troyer – backing vocals
- Mike Alexander – backing vocals
- David Matthews – horn and string arrangements

=== Technical ===
- Produced by Phil Ramone
- Engineered by Jim Boyer
- Additional engineer – Bradshaw Leigh
- Assistant engineers – Mike Allaire and Scott James
- Mixed by Jim Boyer
- Production coordinator – Laura Loncteaux
- Mastered by Ted Jensen at Sterling Sound, New York – Tom Bahler
- Musical advisor – Billy Zampino
- Photography – Gilles Larrain
- Album cover design – Christopher Austopchuk and Mark Larson
- Management – Frank Management, Inc.

== Accolades ==
=== Grammy Awards ===
Year	Nominee / work	Award	Result
1984	An Innocent Man	Album of the Year	Nominated
1984	"Uptown Girl"	Best Pop Vocal Performance – Male	Nominated

=== American Music Awards ===
Year	Nominee / work	Award	Result
1983	Billy Joel (performer)	Favorite Pop/Rock Male Artist	Nominated
1983	"Tell Her About It"	Favorite Pop/Rock Video	Nominated

== Charts ==
=== Weekly charts ===
Weekly chart performance for An Innocent Man
Chart (1983–1984)	Peak position
Australian Albums (Kent Music Report)	3
Canada Top Albums/CDs (RPM)	12
Dutch Albums (Album Top 100)	14
German Albums (Offizielle Top 100)	36
Icelandic Albums (Tónlist)	3
Japanese Albums (Oricon)	3
New Zealand Albums (RMNZ)	1
Norwegian Albums (VG-lista)	9
Swedish Albums (Sverigetopplistan)	39
UK Albums (Official Charts)	2
US Billboard 200	4

=== Year-end charts ===
1983 year-end chart performance for An Innocent Man
Chart (1983)	Position
Australian Albums (Kent Music Report)	11
Canada Top Albums/CDs (RPM)	42
Dutch Albums (Album Top 100)	74
Japanese Albums (Oricon)	18
New Zealand Albums (RMNZ)	29
UK Albums (Gallup)	25

1984 year-end chart performance for An Innocent Man
Chart (1984)	Position
Australian Albums (Kent Music Report)	6
Canada Top Albums/CDs (RPM)	31
Japanese Albums (Oricon)	58
New Zealand Albums (RMNZ)	1
UK Albums (Gallup)	9
US Billboard 200	4

1985 year-end chart performance for An Innocent Man
Chart (1985)	Position
Australian Albums (Kent Music Report)	62
US Billboard 200	67

=== Decade-end charts ===
Decade-end chart performance for An Innocent Man
Chart (1980–1989)	Position
Australian Albums (Kent Music Report)	12

== Certifications ==
Certifications for An Innocent Man
Region	Certification	Certified units/sales
Australia (ARIA)	Gold	20,000^{^}
Canada (Music Canada)	3× Platinum	300,000^{^}
Denmark (IFPI Danmark)	Gold	10,000^{‡}
Hong Kong (IFPI Hong Kong)	Gold	10,000^{*}
Japan	—	510,000
New Zealand (RMNZ)	Platinum	15,000^{^}
United Kingdom (BPI)	3× Platinum	900,000^{^}
United States (RIAA)	8× Platinum	8,000,000^{‡}
^{*} Sales figures based on certification alone.^{^} Shipments figures based on certification alone.^{‡} Sales+streaming figures based on certification alone.
