= Leave a Tender Moment Alone =

Single by Billy Joel

from the album An Innocent Man
- B-side: "This Night"
- Released: June 1984
- Genre: Soft rock
- Length: 3:56
- Label: Columbia
- Songwriter: Billy Joel
- Producer: Phil Ramone

Billy Joel singles chronology
| "The Longest Time" (1984) | "Leave a Tender Moment Alone" (1984) | "This Night" (1984) |

"Leave a Tender Moment Alone" is a song performed by Billy Joel and the fifth single from his album An Innocent Man. Toots Thielemans makes a guest appearance on harmonica. The song reached number 27 on the U.S. Billboard Hot 100 charts and spent two weeks at number one on the Adult Contemporary chart.

"Leave a Tender Moment Alone" was the only single from the album released there not to reach the top 20 of the chart, and, along with the title track, was the second single not to have a video made for it.

== Reception ==
Cash Box called the song "a tender country-tinged cut that is highlighted by the veteran songster’s effortless vocalizing."

Joel eventually put together a music video for the song, which was filmed during his concert tour to promote An Innocent Man and which features Thielemans on harmonica. As Joel sits down at the piano, he says he went to Paris just to get Thielemans to play on the single. The video received significant airplay on MTV during the summer of 1984, while the single was on the charts.

== Track listing ==
=== 7" single ===
1. "Leave a Tender Moment Alone"
2. "This Night" (US B-side)
3. "Goodnight Saigon" (UK B-side)

A 'special souvenir 5 track 12 inch' vinyl was also available.

== Chart positions ==
| Chart (1984) | Peak position |
|---|---|
| Australia (Kent Music Report) | 76 |
| Canadian Singles Chart | 58 |
| French Singles Chart | 66 |
| Irish Singles Chart | 16 |
| New Zealand Singles Chart | 21 |
| UK Singles (OCC) | 29 |
| U.S. Billboard Hot 100 | 27 |
| U.S. Billboard Hot Adult Contemporary Tracks | 1 |

== See also ==
- List of number-one adult contemporary singles of 1984 (U.S.)
