= Vienna (Billy Joel song) =

Song by Billy Joel

from the album The Stranger
- A-side: "Just the Way You Are"
- Released: September 29, 1977
- Studio: A & R Recording, New York City
- Genre: Soft rock; pop rock
- Length: 3:34
- Label: Columbia Records
- Songwriter: Billy Joel
- Producer: Phil Ramone

"Vienna" is a song from Billy Joel's 1977 album The Stranger, originally released as the B-side to the single "Just the Way You Are".

A video for the song was released in 2024.

== Musical structure ==
The song begins with a piano melody in the right hand and chords in the left, ultimately cadencing to the tonic chord of B♭. However, the first chord of the verse is a Gm, which is the relative minor chord of B♭. A change to the vi chord does not always indicate a change in key, but each verse ends with a V-i authentic cadence in Gm, indicating that a key change has taken place. The chorus begins with an E♭ chord, the IV chord in B♭, which is a half step up from D, giving a rising feeling going from the verse to the chorus. The end of the chorus cadences back to the tonic of B♭ with the chords C, G♭, F, B♭. G♭ is the tritone substitution of the V chord for F, and F to B♭ forms another authentic cadence.

== Composition ==
Lyrically, Joel was inspired by visiting the city of Vienna and his father, who left the family when Joel was a child. Joel has stated that "Vienna" is a metaphor for old age, but also may have been subconsciously about his father. Speaking more broadly about the song's message, he said in a 2008 interview that it conveys "you don't have to squeeze your whole life into your 20s and 30s trying to make it, trying to achieve that American dream, getting in the rat race and killing yourself. You have a whole life to live. I kind of used 'Vienna' as a metaphor, there is a reason for being old, a purpose". He also said: "We treat old people in this country pretty badly. We put them in rest homes, we kinda kick them under the rug and make believe they don’t exist. They [the people in Vienna] don’t feel like that. In a lot of these older places in the world, they value their older people and their older people feel they can still be a part of the community and I thought 'This is a terrific idea' – that old people are useful – and that means I don’t have to worry so much about getting old because I can still have a use in this world in my old age. I thought 'Vienna waits for you…'"

== Charts ==
Chart performance for "Vienna"
| Chart (2025) | Peak position |
|---|---|
| Netherlands (Single Tip) | 5 |
| Sweden Heatseeker (Sverigetopplistan) | 5 |

== Certifications ==
Certifications for "Vienna"
| Region | Certification | Certified units/sales |
|---|---|---|
| Denmark (IFPI Danmark) | Platinum | 90,000^{‡} |
| New Zealand (RMNZ) | 3× Platinum | 90,000^{‡} |
| Spain (Promusicae) | Gold | 50,000^{‡} |
| United Kingdom (BPI) | 2× Platinum | 1,200,000^{‡} |
| United States (RIAA) | 3× Platinum | 3,000,000^{‡} |
^{‡} Sales+streaming figures based on certification alone.

== Reception and legacy ==
It was played in a 1981 episode of Taxi called "Vienna Waits". Marilu Henner's character Elaine Nardo refers to the song while on vacation in Europe with Alex Reiger, played by Judd Hirsch. Due to home viewing licensing restrictions, the song has been omitted from the episode on DVD, though is intact on the Hulu versions of the episode.

In a July 2008 New York Times article, Joel cited this as one of his two favorite songs, along with "Summer, Highland Falls" (from his album, Turnstiles).

The song was covered by Ben Platt in the first season of The Politician's finale "Vienna" released in September 2019.

Writing in 2022, Tim Grierson of MEL Magazine attributed the song's endurance to it being featured in the 2004 film 13 Going on 30, prominence on social media platforms like Twitter and TikTok through the early 2020s, and its messaging, leading to a popularity that he identifies as particularly strong among younger people. He further wrote, "unlike something like 'Piano Man,' it hasn't been shoved down our throats for the entirety of our lives. 'Vienna' feels like something you get to discover on your own and then claim for yourself". Joel also attributed its late popularity to the film, adding "That's a movie that was popular with girls, and girls are who most of the enthusiasm for the song comes from ... It's a coming-of-age song: 'Slow down you crazy child'. So I guess it resonates with younger people." He has also said that the lyrics reminds listeners "you don't have to squeeze your whole life into your 20s and 30s trying to make it, trying to achieve that American dream, getting in the rat race and killing yourself. You have a whole life to live".

PopMatters critic David Pike rated it one of the "41 essential pop/rock songs with accordion".

== Cover versions ==
- In 2015, Mac Miller covered the song under his alias Larry Fisherman.
- In 2026, a cover was performed by Austrian singer Cesár Sampson as an interval act in the final of the Eurovision Song Contest, which was held in Vienna.
