= Uptown Girl =

1983 single by Billy Joel

- U.S. and Canadian picture sleeve (also used for the Japanese release with Japanese text)

Single by Billy Joel

from the album An Innocent Man
- B-side: "Careless Talk"
- Released: September 19, 1983
- Genre: Doo-wop; pop rock; pop soul
- Length: 3:18
- Label: Columbia
- Songwriter: Billy Joel
- Producer: Phil Ramone

Billy Joel singles chronology
| "Tell Her About It" (1983) | "Uptown Girl" (1983) | "An Innocent Man" (1983) |

Music video
- "Uptown Girl" on YouTube

"Uptown Girl" is a song written and performed by American musician Billy Joel from his ninth studio album, An Innocent Man (1983), released in September 1983 as the album's second single. The lyrics describe a working-class "downtown man" attempting to woo a wealthy "uptown girl". The 12" EP has the tracks "My Life", "Just the Way You Are" and "It's Still Rock and Roll to Me" (catalogue number TA3775), whereas some 7" single versions featured "Careless Talk" as a B-side.

"Uptown Girl" peaked at number three on the Billboard Hot 100 for five consecutive weeks from November 12 to December 10, 1983. It also reached number one in Australia, New Zealand, and the United Kingdom for five weeks, his only number-one hit in the country. It was the second-best-selling single of 1983 in the United Kingdom behind Culture Club's "Karma Chameleon", which Joel had knocked off the number-one position on November 1, 1983. The song was the 19th-best-selling single of the 1980s in the United Kingdom, selling 975,000 copies. It has sold over 1.8 million copies as of 2025.

== Inspiration ==
According to an interview with Howard Stern, Joel had originally titled the song "Uptown Girls", and it was conceived on an occasion when he was surrounded by Christie Brinkley, Whitney Houston, and his then-girlfriend Elle Macpherson who he briefly dated in 1982. According to numerous interviews with Joel, the song was initially written about his relationship with Macpherson, but it ended up also becoming about his soon-to-be wife, Brinkley, both women being two of the most famous supermodels of the 1980s. Joel said that the song was inspired by the music of Frankie Valli and the Four Seasons.

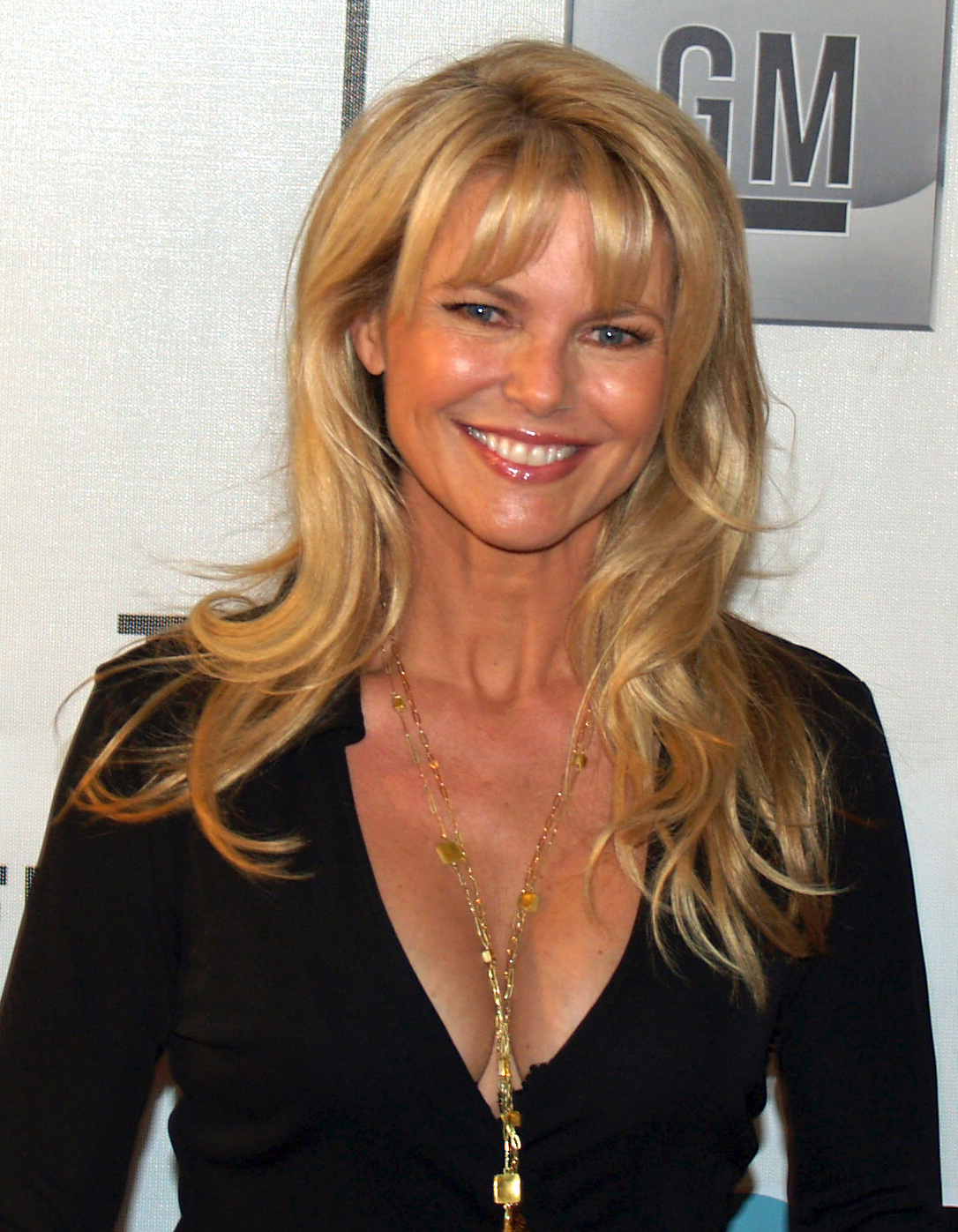
Christie Brinkley, Joel's future wife, appears as the main character of the video

== Reception ==
Cash Box said that "sounding uncannily like Frankie Valli, Joel plays out the city uptown-downtown caste system, longing for a seemingly unavailable 'white-bread' lovely." Four Seasons bassist Joe Long praised the record and considered it vindication for him, as he had been forced out of the band during its 1970s renaissance when it moved away from the classic sound; Long argued that the success of "Uptown Girl" had shown the Four Seasons had not needed to make those kinds of changes.

== Music video ==
The video depicts Joel and his backup singers working as auto mechanics. Brinkley arrives in a chauffeured Rolls-Royce as Joel and the mechanics dance with her. A poster of Brinkley can be seen in the garage as well as on a billboard above the garage advertising "Uptown Cosmetics". At the end of the video Joel and Brinkley ride off on a motorcycle. Before the song starts, footage from the music video "Tell Her About It" is seen playing on a portable TV.

In 1985, Joel said, "'Uptown Girl' I wasn't too crazy about, because they wanted me to dance. I sort of said, OK, you know, I'll give it a try. We shot it on the two hottest days of the year."

== Charts ==
=== Weekly charts ===
| Chart (1983–1984) | Peak position |
|---|---|
| Australia (Kent Music Report) | 1 |
| Austria (Ö3 Austria Top 40) | 18 |
| Belgium (Ultratop 50 Flanders) | 3 |
| Canada (The Record) | 3 |
| Canada Top Singles (RPM) | 4 |
| Canada Adult Contemporary (RPM) | 1 |
| Colombia (UPI) | 9 |
| Denmark (Tracklisten) | 8 |
| Europe (Europarade Top 30) | 6 |
| Finland (Suomen virallinen lista) | 26 |
| Ireland (IRMA) | 1 |
| Israel (Israeli Singles Chart) | 1 |
| Netherlands (Dutch Top 40) | 8 |
| Netherlands (Single Top 100) | 10 |
| New Zealand (Recorded Music NZ) | 1 |
| Norway (VG-lista) | 3 |
| South Africa (Springbok Radio) | 8 |
| Spain Airplay (Top 40 Radio) | 9 |
| UK Singles (Official Charts) | 1 |
| US Billboard Hot 100 | 3 |
| US Adult Contemporary (Billboard) | 2 |
| US Mainstream Rock Airplay (Billboard) | 22 |
| West Germany (GfK) | 18 |
| Zimbabwe Singles (ZIMA) | 9 |

=== Year-end charts ===
| Chart (1983) | Position |
|---|---|
| Australia (Kent Music Report) | 62 |
| Belgium (Ultratop Flanders) | 34 |
| Brazil (Crowley) | 14 |
| Canada Top Singles (RPM) | 46 |
| Netherlands (Dutch Top 40) | 94 |
| UK Singles (OCC) | 2 |

| Chart (1984) | Position |
|---|---|
| Australia (Kent Music Report) | 82 |
| US Billboard Hot 100 | 39 |
| US Adult Contemporary (Billboard) | 49 |

== Certifications ==
| Region | Certification | Certified units/sales |
|---|---|---|
| Canada (Music Canada) | Gold | 50,000^{^} |
| Denmark (IFPI Danmark) | Platinum | 90,000^{‡} |
| Germany (BVMI) | Gold | 300,000^{‡} |
| Italy (FIMI) | Gold | 50,000^{‡} |
| New Zealand (RMNZ) | 6× Platinum | 180,000^{‡} |
| Portugal (AFP) | Gold | 20,000^{‡} |
| Spain (Promusicae) | Platinum | 60,000^{‡} |
| United Kingdom (BPI) | 3× Platinum | 1,800,000^{‡} |
| United States (RIAA) | 6× Platinum | 6,000,000^{‡} |
^{^} Shipments figures based on certification alone.^{‡} Sales+streaming figures based on certification alone.

== Personnel ==
- Billy Joel – Baldwin SF-10 acoustic piano, lead and backing vocals
- David Brown – lead electric guitar
- Russell Javors – rhythm electric guitar
- Doug Stegmeyer – bass guitar
- Liberty DeVitto – drums
- Mark Rivera – percussion, backing vocals

Additional personnel

- Mike Alexander – backing vocals
- Tom Bahler – backing vocals
- Rory Dodd – backing vocals
- Frank Floyd – backing vocals
- Lani Groves – backing vocals
- Ullanda McCullough – backing vocals
- Ron Taylor – backing vocals
- Terry Textor – backing vocals
- Eric Troyer – backing vocals

== Legacy and impact ==
Olivia Rodrigo mentioned the song and Joel in her hit single "Deja Vu", which became a top 3 U.S. hit. Rodrigo made a surprise appearance at Joel's Madison Square Garden performance on August 24, 2022, singing "Deja Vu" with Joel on piano and "Uptown Girl" as a duet with Joel.

== Westlife version ==
"Uptown Girl"

Single by Westlife

from the album World of Our Own
- B-side: "Angels Wings"
- Released: March 5, 2001
- Studio: Rokstone (London)
- Genre: Pop; dance-pop; doo-wop
- Length: 3:06
- Label: BMG
- Songwriter: Billy Joel
- Producer: Steve Mac

Westlife UK/Ireland singles chronology
| "What Makes a Man" (2000) | "Uptown Girl" (2001) | "Queen of My Heart" / "When You're Looking Like That" (2001) |

Westlife international singles chronology
| "I Lay My Love on You" (2001) | "Uptown Girl" (2001) | "When You're Looking Like That" (2001) |

Music video
- "Uptown Girl" on YouTube

Irish boy band Westlife covered the song for their third studio album, World of Our Own. It was released on March 5, 2001, as the 2001 Comic Relief charity single. The song was also released as the fifth single for the European Special Edition and Asian Deluxe Edition Bonus Disc of the group's second album, Coast to Coast (2000). The Westlife version is slightly shorter than Joel's version because one of the verses was not repeated. The music video was a parody of Joel's, with the members of Westlife playing workers in a burger bar. Robert Bathurst, Crispin Bonham-Carter, Ioan Gruffudd, Tim McInnerny and James Wilby play the snobby uptown customers and Claudia Schiffer is in the Christie Brinkley role.

"Uptown Girl" reached number one in Ireland, Mexico and the United Kingdom. It became the best-selling single of 2001 and the tenth-best-selling single of all time in Ireland. In the United Kingdom, it was the sixth-best-selling single of 2001 and the 24th-best-selling single of the decade in the UK charts, with sales of 756,215 copies. It became the band's best-selling single (paid-for and combined sales categories) in the UK and also achieved the highest first week sales (292,318 copies) of any of their singles. It has since been certified platinum by the British Phonographic Industry for shipments of 600,000 copies. By March 2017, the song had sold almost 800,000 copies in the country from physical and digital copies which make up 81% of the total units. By January 2019, it had 920,000 total sales. As of 30 November 2021, it has 1,116,399 million total sales with 67% of it or 748,000 were physical sales. This makes the single part of the list of million-selling singles in the United Kingdom and the first one for the group.

=== Track listing ===
- United Kingdom

CD1

1. "Uptown Girl" (Radio Edit) – 3:06
2. "Angel's Wings" (2001 Remix) – 4:14
3. "Uptown Girl" (Video) – 3:14

CD2

1. "Uptown Girl" (Radio Edit) – 3:06
2. "Uptown Girl" (Extended Version) – 5:02
3. "Behind the Scenes Footage & Band Messages"

VHS

1. "Uptown Girl" (The Video) – 3:14
2. "The Making of Uptown Girl" (Mini-Documentary)
3. "The Bits That Didn't Quite Go to Plan ..."

DVD

1. "Uptown Girl" (The Video) – 3:14
2. "The Making of Uptown Girl" (Mini-Documentary)
3. "The Bits That Didn't Quite Go to Plan ..."
4. "Comic Relief Weblink"
5. "Photo Gallery"
- Japan
1. "Uptown Girl" (Radio Edit) – 3:06
2. "Uptown Girl" (Extended Version) – 5:02
3. "Angel's Wings" (Original Version) – 4:02
4. "Close Your Eyes" – 4:32
5. "Uptown Girl" (Video) – 3:14
6. "Behind the Scenes Footage & Band Messages"

=== Charts ===
==== Weekly charts ====
Single

| Chart (2001) | Peak position |
|---|---|
| Australia (ARIA) | 6 |
| Austria (Ö3 Austria Top 40) | 12 |
| Belgium (Ultratop 50 Flanders) | 5 |
| Belgium (Ultratip Bubbling Under Wallonia) | 2 |
| Croatia (HRT) | 2 |
| Denmark (Tracklisten) | 2 |
| Europe (Eurochart Hot 100) | 8 |
| Europe (European Hit Radio) | 12 |
| Finland (Suomen virallinen lista) | 13 |
| Finland Airplay (Radiosoittolista) | 9 |
| France (SNEP) | 8 |
| France Airplay (SNEP) | 9 |
| Germany (GfK) | 8 |
| Ireland (IRMA) | 1 |
| Italy (FIMI) | 10 |
| Italy (Musica e dischi) | 10 |
| Japan (Oricon) | 20 |
| Netherlands (Dutch Top 40) | 3 |
| Netherlands (Single Top 100) | 2 |
| Netherlands Airplay (Music & Media) | 2 |
| New Zealand (Recorded Music NZ) | 4 |
| Norway (VG-lista) | 3 |
| Poland Airplay (Polish Airplay Charts) | 10 |
| Scottish Singles Sales (Official Charts) | 1 |
| Spain (Promusicae) | 7 |
| Spain Airplay (Top 40 Radio) | 24 |
| Sweden (Sverigetopplistan) | 2 |
| Switzerland (Schweizer Hitparade) | 13 |
| UK Singles (Official Charts) | 1 |
| UK Airplay (Music Week) | 9 |

| Chart (2017) | Peak position |
|---|---|
| Poland Airplay (ZPAV) | 94 |

Video album

| Chart (2001) | Peak position |
|---|---|
| UK DVD Albums (OCC) | 5 |
| UK Video Albums (OCC) | 3 |

==== Year-end charts ====
| Chart (2001) | Position |
|---|---|
| Australia (ARIA) | 44 |
| Belgium (Ultratop 50 Flanders) | 26 |
| Europe (Eurochart Hot 100) | 30 |
| Europe (European Hit Radio) | 46 |
| Germany (Media Control) | 50 |
| Ireland (IRMA) | 1 |
| Netherlands (Dutch Top 40) | 50 |
| Netherlands (Single Top 100) | 34 |
| New Zealand (RIANZ) | 39 |
| Sweden (Hitlistan) | 18 |
| Switzerland (Schweizer Hitparade) | 87 |
| UK Singles (OCC) | 6 |

==== Decade-end charts ====
| Chart (2000–2009) | Position |
|---|---|
| UK Top 100 Songs of the Decade | 23 |

=== Certifications and sales ===
| Region | Certification | Certified units/sales |
|---|---|---|
| Australia (ARIA) | Platinum | 70,000^{^} |
| Denmark (IFPI Danmark) | Gold | 45,000^{‡} |
| France (SNEP) | Gold | 250,000^{*} |
| New Zealand (RMNZ) | Gold | 15,000^{‡} |
| Sweden (GLF) | Gold | 15,000^{^} |
| United Kingdom (BPI) | 2× Platinum | 1,200,000^{‡} |
^{*} Sales figures based on certification alone.^{^} Shipments figures based on certification alone.^{‡} Sales+streaming figures based on certification alone.
