= Tell Her About It =

Single by Billy Joel

from the album An Innocent Man
- B-side: "Easy Money"
- Released: July 17, 1983
- Genre: Soul; pop rock
- Length: 3:52 (album version); 3:35 (Single edit)
- Label: Columbia
- Songwriter: Billy Joel
- Producer: Phil Ramone

Billy Joel singles chronology
"Goodnight Saigon" (1983)	"Tell Her About It" (1983)	"Uptown Girl" (1983)

Alternative cover
- UK single

"Tell Her About It" is a song written and performed by Billy Joel from his album An Innocent Man (1983), released as the album's first single in July 1983. In the song, the singer exhorts a young man to tell the woman he loves how he feels about her before he misses his chance. It hit the number-one spot on the Billboard Hot 100 chart for one week on September 24, 1983, replacing "Maniac" by Michael Sembello. The single was certified Platinum by the RIAA for US sales of over 1,000,000 units.

A "special version" mixed by John "Jellybean" Benitez was also released as a 12-inch maxi single. The cover art varied depending on the country of release. The remixed version was longer, approximately five-and-a-half minutes. The B-side featured Joel's song "Easy Money" from the same album, and a live recording of the song "You Got Me Hummin'" written by Isaac Hayes and David Porter.

== Reception ==
Cash Box said that the song "harks back to [Joel's] urban rock ’n’ roll roots" and begins "with a falsetto straight out of Smokey Robinson & the Miracles and then proceeds to offer friendly advice via the sound of ’60s Motown—horns, back-up vocals, rhythms and all."

== Music video ==
The video for the song shows Joel singing the song as if he were on The Ed Sullivan Show in 1963. The cover shot for the UK release of the song was taken from the video. An Ed Sullivan imitator (Will Jordan) introduces Joel (as "B.J. and the Affordables") after Topo Gigio, the talking mouse, finishes his skit. During the song there are different scenes of teenagers watching Joel on TV at home, crowding around appliance store windows watching him, dancing to his song. There is even a brief scene of a Soviet cosmonaut in space listening to the song, with the lyrics displayed at the bottom in the Russian language and in Cyrillic script. At the end of the song, comedian Rodney Dangerfield is there preparing to go on stage under the false impression that he is next, thanks Joel for warming up the crowd. "Patriska the Dancing Bear" is instead called to the stage, much to Dangerfield's disbelief.

== Live performances ==
Joel performed the song fairly regularly after its release for a few years during the tours to support his albums An Innocent Man and The Bridge. The song, however, was dropped after the latter tour and it has not been performed live since 1991, making it one of the very few major hits across his career that he no longer plays in his concerts.

== Track listing ==
=== 12-inch maxi single ===
==== Side A ====
1. "Tell Her About It" – 5:35

==== Side B ====
1. "Easy Money" – 4:00
2. "You Got Me Hummin'" (Live) – 3:43

== Charts ==
Chart (1983–1984)	Peak position
Australia (Kent Music Report)	9
Belgium (Ultratop 50 Flanders)	19
Canada (The Record)	4
Canada Top Singles (RPM)	5
Europe (Europarade Top 30)	15
Ireland (IRMA)	2
Israel (IBA)	7
Japan (Oricon)	58
Netherlands (Dutch Top 40)	27
Netherlands (Single Top 100)	39
New Zealand (Recorded Music NZ)	12
South Africa (Springbok)	3
UK Singles (Official Charts)	4
US Billboard Hot 100	1
US Cashbox Top 100	3
US Billboard Hot Adult Contemporary Tracks	1
US Mainstream Rock (Billboard)	17

Year-end chart (1983)	Position
Australia (Kent Music Report)	59
US Top Pop Singles (Billboard)	45

== Certifications ==
Certifications for "Tell Her About It"
Region	Certification	Certified units/sales
Canada (Music Canada)	Gold	50,000^{^}
United Kingdom (BPI)	Silver	250,000^{^}
United States (RIAA)	Platinum	1,000,000^{‡}
^{^} Shipments figures based on certification alone.^{‡} Sales+streaming figures based on certification alone.

== See also ==
- List of Billboard Hot 100 number ones of 1983
- List of Billboard Adult Contemporary number ones of 1983
