= This Night (Billy Joel song) =

Single by Billy Joel

from the album An Innocent Man
- A-side: "Leave a Tender Moment Alone" (U.S.)
- B-side: "I'll Cry Instead" (live) (U.K. and Japan)
- Released: October 21, 1983 (Japan); November 1984 (UK)
- Genre: Doo-wop
- Length: 4:19
- Label: Columbia
- Songwriters: Billy Joel, Ludwig van Beethoven
- Producer: Phil Ramone

Billy Joel singles chronology
"Leave a Tender Moment Alone" (1984)	"This Night" (1984)	"Keeping the Faith" (1984)

"This Night" is a song by Billy Joel released as the sixth single from his album An Innocent Man. The basis of the song's chorus uses the second movement of Ludwig van Beethoven's Pathétique Sonata. Beethoven is credited as one of the song's writers on the sleeve of the album as "L.v. Beethoven". Joel has said in interviews that "This Night" was written about his brief relationship with supermodel Elle Macpherson, whom he dated just prior to second wife Christie Brinkley.

The song was released as a single only in the UK and Japan, reached number 78 on the UK Singles Chart and number 88 on the Japanese Oricon Singles Chart.

In the United States, "This Night" was the B-side of "Leave a Tender Moment Alone".

== Track listing ==
=== 7" single ===
1. "This Night"
2. "I'll Cry Instead" (live)

=== Japanese 7" single / CBS 07SP 722 ===
1. "This Night"
2. "Careless talk"

== Chart positions ==
Chart (1984)	Peak position
Belgium (Ultratop 50 Flanders)	21
Japan (Oricon)	88
UK Singles (OCC)	78
