= An Innocent Man (song) =

Single by Billy Joel

from the album An Innocent Man
- B-side: "I'll Cry Instead" (live)
- Released: December 1983
- Genre: Doo-wop; soul; R&B
- Length: 5:17
- Label: Columbia
- Songwriter: Billy Joel
- Producer: Phil Ramone

Billy Joel singles chronology
"Uptown Girl" (1983)	"An Innocent Man" (1983)	"The Longest Time" (1984)

"An Innocent Man" is a 1983 song performed by Billy Joel released as the third single from his album of the same name. The song, whose musical style is an homage to Ben E. King and the Drifters, reached No. 10 on the Billboard Hot 100 chart, the third consecutive top 10 single from the album. It also spent one week at No. 1 on the Billboard adult contemporary chart.

Joel was quoted in a 1997 interview describing the high notes he sang during the song: "I had a suspicion that was going to be the last time I was going to be able to hit those notes, so why not go out in a blaze of glory? That was the end of Billy's high note."

== Reception ==
Cash Box said that "sounding soulful with a suburban lilt, Joel takes a cue from the Righteous Bros. in a performance that recalls Joel’s previous 'Until the Night.'"

Walter Everett described the song's lyrics as "one of Joel's deepest".

== Chart positions ==
Chart (1983–1984)	Peak position
Australia (Kent Music Report)	23
Canada Top Singles (RPM)	16
Ireland (IRMA)	3
Israel (IBA)	19
New Zealand (Recorded Music NZ)	24
Spain Airplay (Top 40 Radio)	33
UK Singles (Official Charts)	8
UK Airplay (Music & Media)	13
US Billboard Hot 100	10
US Billboard Hot Adult Contemporary Tracks	1
Venezuela (UPI)	5

Year-end chart (1984)	Rank
UK Singles (Gallup)	64
US Top Pop Singles (Billboard)	72

== Certifications ==
Region	Certification	Certified units/sales
United Kingdom (BPI)	Silver	250,000^{^}
^{^} Shipments figures based on certification alone.

== See also ==
- List of number-one adult contemporary singles of 1984 (U.S.)
