= The Longest Time =

Single by Billy Joel

from the album An Innocent Man
- B-side: "Christie Lee"
- Released: March 1984
- Recorded: 1983
- Genre: Doo-wop; acapella
- Length: 3:40
- Label: Columbia
- Songwriter: Billy Joel
- Producer: Phil Ramone

Billy Joel singles chronology
"An Innocent Man" (1983)	"The Longest Time" (1984)	"Leave a Tender Moment Alone" (1984)

"The Longest Time" is a doo-wop song by Billy Joel, released in 1984 as the fourth single from the 1983 album An Innocent Man. Following the theme of the album in paying tribute to Joel's musical influences, the song is presented in the style of Frankie Lymon and the Teenagers. It reached number 14 on the Billboard Hot 100 and number 1 on Billboard's Adult Contemporary chart. In the United Kingdom the song reached number 25 on the UK Singles Chart.

The song features Joel on lead vocals, all backing vocals, and percussive sounds such as finger snaps and hand claps. When the song is covered by vocal groups, the bass part is typically sung. Phil Ramone and Joel had intended to feature a vocal group but Joel recorded each of the parts himself.

== Music video ==
The music video starts with a man (played by Joel) in a gym after his 25th high school reunion party. Looking around at posters of several class awards, he breaks into song as his band, apparently portrayed as his high school friends, enters the gym. As they sing, they alternate between their high school and current selves, ending with their high school selves walking out of the restroom and interacting with a puzzled janitor (Nick Stewart). The video was entirely filmed at Pratt Institute in Brooklyn and was directed by Jay Dubin.

== Personnel ==
- Billy Joel – lead and backing vocals, finger snaps, hand claps
- Doug Stegmeyer – bass guitar

Additional personnel

- Tom Bahler – vocal arranger

== Chart performance ==
Chart (1984–1985)	Peak position
Australia (Kent Music Report)	15
Canada Top Singles (RPM)	36
Irish Singles Chart	18
Israel (IBA)	28
New Zealand Singles Chart	24
UK Singles (OCC)	25
UK Airplay (Music & Media)	9
US Billboard Hot 100	14
US Billboard Hot Adult Contemporary	1

Year-end chart (1984)	Rank
US Top Pop Singles (Billboard)	89

== Certifications ==
Region	Certification	Certified units/sales
New Zealand (RMNZ)	Gold	15,000^{‡}
United Kingdom (BPI)	Silver	200,000^{‡}
United States (RIAA)	2× Platinum	2,000,000^{‡}
^{‡} Sales+streaming figures based on certification alone.
