= Just the Way You Are (Billy Joel song) =

- Side-A label of U.S. vinyl single

Single by Billy Joel

from the album The Stranger
- B-side: "Get It Right the First Time"
- Released: November 1977
- Recorded: 1976
- Genre: Soft rock; smooth jazz
- Length: 4:47 (album version); 3:27 (single version)
- Label: Columbia
- Songwriter: Billy Joel
- Producer: Phil Ramone

Billy Joel singles chronology
"Movin' Out (Anthony's Song)" (1977)	"Just the Way You Are" (1977)	"She's Always a Woman" (1978)

Audio
- "Billy Joel - Just the Way You Are (Audio)" on YouTube

"Just the Way You Are" is a song by Billy Joel from his fifth studio album The Stranger (1977), released as the album's second single in early November 1977. It became both Joel's first US Top 10 and UK Top 20 single (reaching No. 3 and No. 19 respectively), as well as Joel's first Gold single in the US. The song also topped the Billboard Easy Listening Chart for the entire month of January 1978.

"Just the Way You Are" garnered two Grammy Awards for Record of the Year and Song of the Year in 1979 and is considered a pop standard.

== Background ==
Joel shared that the melody and chord progression for this song came to him while he was dreaming. In an interview on the Howard Stern Radio Show on November 16, 2010, Joel said that the inspiration for writing the name of the song and how it sounds in the chorus was directly taken from the last line in the Frankie Valli and the Four Seasons song "Rag Doll", which incidentally was also a larger inspiration for Joel's later song "Uptown Girl".

"Just the Way You Are", which Joel had written for his first wife (and also his business manager at the time), Elizabeth Weber, was initially not liked by either Joel or his band, and Joel had originally decided against making the track a part of The Stranger, but at the request of both Linda Ronstadt and Phoebe Snow (both were recording in other studios in the same building at the time), he agreed to put the song on the final mix. However, the album's producer, Phil Ramone, later contradicted Joel's claim, stating in an interview that they could not afford to exclude the song because Joel did not have that much material from which to choose for the album. The song also features an ethereal choir effect similar to that heard in "I'm Not in Love" by 10cc, due to the keyboard and background vocal tape loops Joel and Ramone used.

Joel and Weber divorced in 1982 and Joel rarely performed the song live after 1986 (until the 2000s); Joel has stated that he disliked playing the song live in the wake of his divorce from Weber. He noted that during performances of the song around the time of his first divorce, his drummer Liberty DeVitto would jokingly parody the lyrics in the chorus as "She got the house. She got the car."

When "Just the Way You Are" was released as a single, it was shortened by over a minute. The differences are the removal of the second verse and an earlier fade. A live performance of the song was also used as a music video. On February 18, 1978, the song peaked at No. 3, and Joel performed a shorter version of the song as the musical guest that day on Saturday Night Live (along with "Only the Good Die Young"). The single version (fading eight seconds later) was included in the first release of Greatest Hits Volume I & Volume II, but the full album version was restored for the remastered release of that compilation.

The saxophone solo is played by Phil Woods, a well-known jazz performer and Grammy award winner. Woods' performance on the song exposed him to a wider audience and introduced his music to rock fans.

Joel also performed a piano/vocal version of the song with new lyrics on a Sesame Street skit dated 1989, accompanied by actress Marlee Matlin and featuring Oscar the Grouch.

== Reception ==
Paul McCartney cited "Just the Way You Are" as the song that he is most jealous of. "I get asked, 'Is there a song that you wish you'd written?' And I always ... that's the one I always say," McCartney said in the documentary Billy Joel: And So It Goes.

Cash Box said that "a slight influence of Stevie Wonder is evident in the melody and light Latin rhythm". Record World called it "a thoughtful ballad, very well produced, with a sax break that excels".

Michael Galluci of Ultimate Classic Rock described the song as "one of the most perfectly constructed songs in Joel's catalog".

== Track listing ==
7" U.S. and UK single (1977)

1. "Just the Way You Are" – 3:27
2. "Get It Right the First Time" – 3:54

== Personnel ==
- Billy Joel – lead vocals, Fender Rhodes piano
- Hugh McCracken, Steve Burgh – acoustic guitar
- Doug Stegmeyer – bass guitar
- Liberty DeVitto – drums
- Ralph MacDonald – percussion
- Phil Woods – alto saxophone
- Patrick Williams – orchestration

=== Production ===
- Phil Ramone – producer, engineer
- Jim Boyer – engineer

== Charts ==
=== Weekly charts ===
Chart (1977–1978)	Peak position
Australia (Kent Music Report)	6
Canada Top Singles (RPM)	2
Canada Adult Contemporary (RPM)	1
Ireland (IRMA)	7
Israel (IBA)	30
New Zealand (Recorded Music NZ)	6
Rhodesia (Lyons Maid)	14
South Africa (RiSA)	6
UK Singles (Official Charts)	19
UK Airplay (Record Business)	65
US Billboard Hot 100	3
US Adult Contemporary (Billboard)	1
US Cash Box Top 100	2

Barry White cover

Chart (1978–79)	Peak position
Ireland (IRMA)	15
UK Singles (OCC)	12
US Bubbling Under Hot 100 (Billboard)	2
US Hot Soul Singles (Billboard)	45

=== Year-end charts ===
Chart (1978)	Position
Australia (Kent Music Report)	38
Brazil (Crowley)	23
Canada Top Singles (RPM)	26
New Zealand (RIANZ)	41
US Billboard Hot 100	17
US Cash Box Top 100	18

== Certifications ==
Region	Certification	Certified units/sales
New Zealand (RMNZ)	Platinum	30,000^{‡}
United Kingdom (BPI)	Gold	400,000^{‡}
United States (RIAA)	3× Platinum	3,000,000^{‡}
^{‡} Sales+streaming figures based on certification alone.

== See also ==
- List of number-one adult contemporary singles of 1978 (U.S.)
