= Alexa Ray Joel =

American singer, songwriter, and pianist (born 1985)

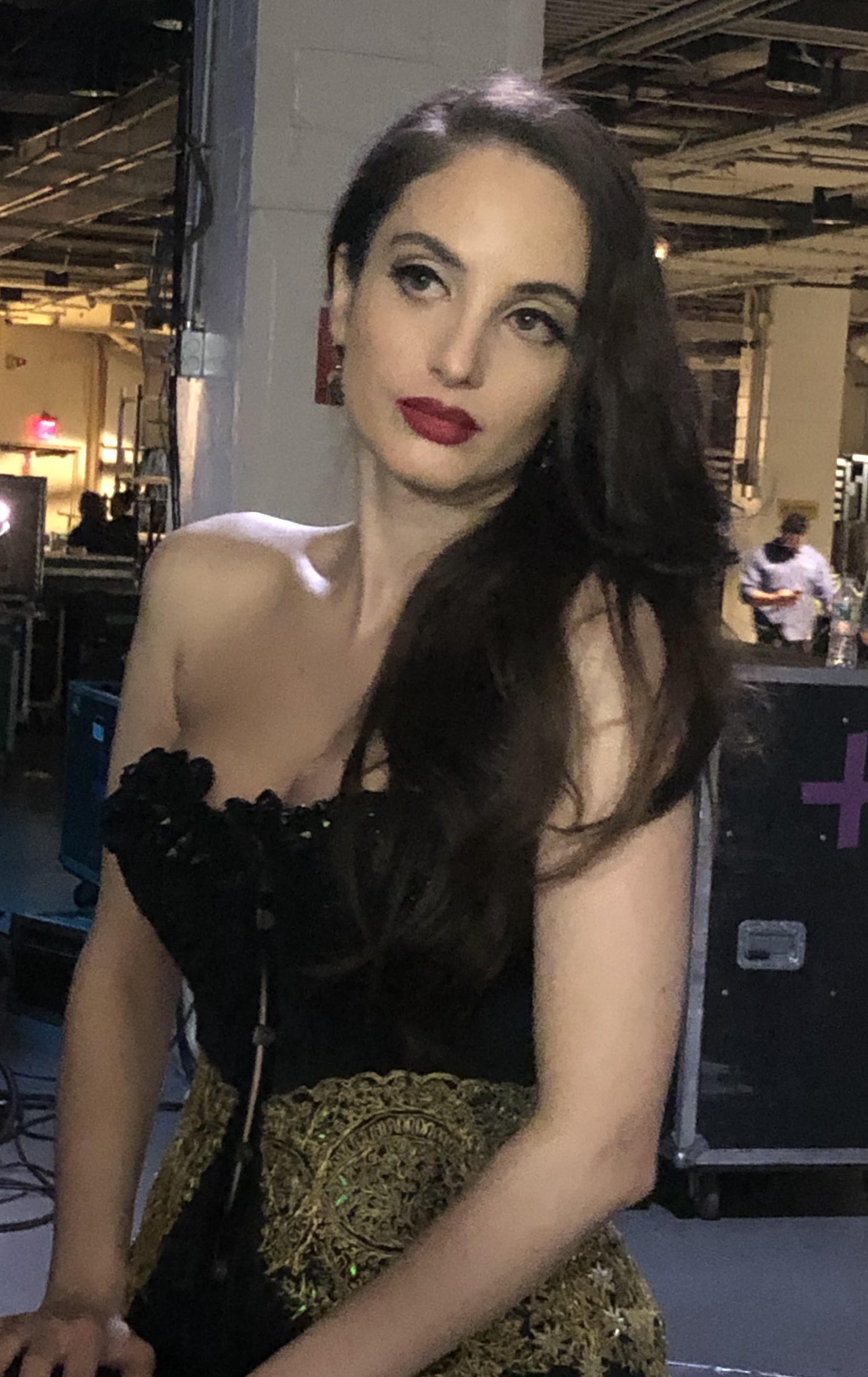
- Joel in 2018
- Born: December 29, 1985 (age 40); New York City, U.S.
- Occupations: Singer; songwriter; pianist
- Years active: 2006–present
- Partner(s): Ryan Gleason (2018–present; engaged)
- Parents: Billy Joel (father); Christie Brinkley (mother)
- Relatives: Karl Amson Joel (great-grandfather); Sailor Brinkley Cook (half-sister)
- Musical career
- Genres: Pop; soul; rock
- Instruments: Vocals; piano; keyboards
- Labels: ARJ Music; Audio Bee; The Hang

Alexa Ray Joel (born December 29, 1985) is an American singer, songwriter, and pianist. She is the daughter of singer/songwriter Billy Joel and model Christie Brinkley. Joel released an EP Sketches (2006) and several singles on independent record labels. She has performed at numerous charity events and New York City fashion events.

== Early life ==
Joel was born on December 29, 1985, in Manhattan, New York City. She is the daughter of singer-songwriter Billy Joel and model Christie Brinkley. Her middle name, Ray, honors the musician Ray Charles, with whom her father recorded the song "Baby Grand". Through her mother, she has a half-brother, Jack Paris Brinkley (né Taubman, born June 2, 1995), and a half-sister, Sailor Brinkley Cook (born July 2, 1998). Joel also has two half-sisters on her father's side: Della Rose (born August 12, 2015) and Remy Anne (born October 22, 2017). She was raised in the Hamptons, mainly in Amagansett, a small census-designated place in East Hampton, and Sag Harbor, New York.

Her father wrote his 1993 song "Lullabye (Goodnight, My Angel)" for her. It is her favorite song he has written. His 1989 song "The Downeaster Alexa" was named after a boat he named for her, although the song itself concerns the struggles of Long Island fishermen. She is also referenced in his 1989 song "Leningrad" (with the line "...He made my daughter laugh, then we embraced...").

Like her father, Joel is known for melodic songwriting and has noted that her musical upbringing gave her a “unique inside view into the songwriting process,” adding that “it’s no wonder I write music in the same way: melody first, and lyrics second.” Joel said that by age 15, she was finishing complete songs with piano accompaniment and writing poetry.

== Career ==
In 2005, at age 19, Joel assembled a band and performed her first live show at Maxwell's in Hoboken, New Jersey. In 2006, Joel played nearly 100 shows, including a Hard Rock Cafe tour completed in May 2006.

=== Sketches ===
Joel self-released and independently distributed the six-song EP Sketches in August 2006. Joel explained "It's called 'Sketches' because it's like raw sketches... About three of the songs, actually, were done in one take." Joel designed and illustrated the CD cover, packaging, and inserts that included her handwritten lyrics. Sketches also included a pop/rock cover of Neil Young's "Don't Let It Bring You Down".

=== After Sketches ===
Joel performed at the New Orleans Jazz & Heritage Festival (April 2007), the 2007 Bonnaroo Music & Arts Festival (June 2007), and the Albany Riverfront Jazz Festival (September 2007).

Joel performed onstage with her father during the 2008 Rainforest Foundation Fund Benefit Concert at Carnegie Hall on May 8, 2008. Other charity events at which Joel has performed include the "Save Sag Harbor" benefit concert (2008), the "Stage For The Cure" benefit for pediatric cancer (New York City, 2008), a benefit for "The Art of Elysium" (artists for seriously ill children; The Hamptons, 2009), a benefit for Habitat for Humanity (Long Beach, New York, 2010), the "Right To Play Day" benefit (Sag Harbor, New York, 2010), and the Eric Trump Foundation benefit for St. Jude Children's Research Hospital (New York City, 2010). She has also supported animal rights, including the Animal Haven's Speakeasy Bash (New York City, 2012).

Joel and her father performed the song "Baby Grand" at a Barack Obama election fundraiser at the Hammerstein Ballroom on October 16, 2008.

In 2009, Joel debuted her single "Invisible" on The Wendy Williams Show in October 2009, the song being described as a "piano-driven ballad... about a bad breakup."

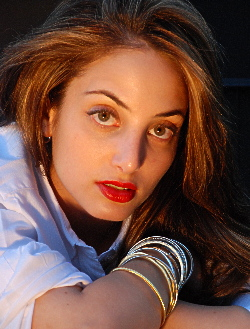
Joel in 2010

The next year, Joel's single, "Notice Me", was listed as a "Hit-Bound song" on the Sirius XM Hits 1 satellite radio channel in August 2010. Newsday described the single as having a "carefree braininess" and "bouncy guitar riffs and an instantly hummable chorus" that made Joel's work "sound like Regina Spektor crossed with Katy Perry". "Notice Me" is Joel's first collaboration with producer Tommy Byrnes and her first since signing with Long Beach, New York management company OCD Music Group/The Hang Productions. Joel described the "Notice Me" video as using fashion to show both a modern look and a vintage throwback look.

Joel did residencies in New York City, including the Oak Room of the Plaza Hotel (late 2010-2011, said to add a "contemporary vibe" to the "storied venue") and the Café Carlyle at the Carlyle Hotel (April 2014).

=== Fashion ===
Joel is active in New York fashion events. She performed at Manhattan's "Fashion's Night Out" in 2009 (Elie Tahari), 2010 (Bloomingdale's), and 2011 (Bloomingdale's). Joel interviewed celebrities and designers as a host for social networking website Julib.com during New York Fashion Week in September 2012 and February 2013, and she performed at the launch of Bobbi Brown's book Pretty Powerful: Beauty Stories to Inspire Confidence, also appearing with Brown on Today. In 2017, Joel posed for the Sports Illustrated swimsuit issue along with her mother, Christie Brinkley, and her half-sister, Sailor Brinkley Cook.

She was on the cover of BELLA magazine's Beauty Issue in 2018.

== Endorsements ==
In February 2010, Joel was chosen the new spokeswoman for Ultimark Products' Prell brand of shampoo, with Joel's songs to serve as background for commercials.

Joel became part of The Gap's "Back to Blue" television ad campaign, performing an interpretation of her father's 1977 song "Just the Way You Are" in September 2013.

== Personal life ==
On December 5, 2009, Joel ingested a large quantity of Traumeel, a homeopathic alternative to ibuprofen. Joel was reported to have taken "several pills"; an NYU Medical Center toxicologist said the drug has "no active ingredient" and indicated that it was essentially impossible to overdose ("basically you'd be taking more of nothing"). Interviewed six months later by ABC News, Joel described herself as having been "distraught and in so much pain" after the end of a four-year romantic relationship but not wanting to bother anyone since it was the holiday season. "I wasn't trying to kill myself. I was panicked. I was not thinking clearly at all. I was in so much pain and I just wanted to numb it." "The intent was to calm me down because I was having a panic attack."

Joel told People magazine that her April 2010 nose job came after five years of consideration and was to correct a deviated septum and to feel better about herself, Joel having been "self-conscious of pictures taken from the side". Joel explained that her surgery waited until she "was in a better place" than at the time of her Traumeel incident four months earlier, further stating that she is "done with plastic surgery".

In a July 2010 interview with 20/20, Joel talked about "moving out of (the) shadows" of her "two megastar parents" and about recovery from her December 2009 crisis with depression. While she acknowledged that it had been "scary" to be "compared to a rock and roll legend", her confidence was said to be "helped along by a wider acceptance" by others. Stating that "I'm not a blond girl with blue eyes and that's fine", she added that Ultimark Products approaching her to be the face of Prell shampoo was a "big confidence booster". Describing overcoming the relationship dependence that triggered her December 2009 Traumeel incident, she said: "I've got to get a new band, whole new songs, whole new career plan. Everything changed after that incident."

In 2013, Joel began dating restaurateur Ryan Gleason. They became engaged on January 1, 2018. As of 2021, the wedding was postponed due to the COVID-19 pandemic. She lives in Nolita, Manhattan.

== Discography ==
=== Sketches ===
(August 2006) (EP, Audio Bee (label))

1. "The Heart of Me" – 5:23
2. "Now It's Gone" – 3:32
3. "Don't Let It Bring You Down" – 3:05
4. "The Revolution Song" – 4:17
5. "Resistance" – 4:07
6. "Song of Yesterday" – 2:53

=== For All My Days ===
(January 2008) (single, Audio Bee (label))

1. "For All My Days" – 4:42

=== Invisible ===
(October 2009) (single)

1. "Invisible"

=== Notice Me ===
(May 2010) (single, Audio Bee or OCD Music Group/The Hang Productions or ARJ Music (label))

1. "Notice Me" – 2:48

=== "All I Can Do Is Love" ===
August 1, 2011 (single, ARJ Music)

1. "All I Can Do Is Love" – 3:50

=== Beg You to Stay ===
(November 8, 2011) (single, ARJ Music)

1. "Beg You to Stay" – 4:48

=== Just the Way You Are ===
(September 16, 2013) (single)

1. "Just the Way You Are" – 4:13
