= Valentin Chmerkovskiy =

Ukrainian-American dancer

- Валентин Чмерковський
- Born: Valentin Aleksandrovich Chmerkovskiy; March 24, 1986 (age 40); Odesa, Ukrainian SSR, Soviet Union (now Ukraine)
- Other name: VC
- Citizenship: Ukraine; United States
- Occupations: Dancer; choreographer; television personality; rapper
- Television: Dancing with the Stars
- Spouse: Jenna Johnson (m. 2019)
- Children: 1
- Relatives: Maksim Chmerkovskiy (brother); Peta Murgatroyd (sister-in-law)

Valentin Aleksandrovich "Val" Chmerkovskiy (Note: Ukrainian: Валентин Олександрович Чмерковський, romanized: Valentyn Oleksandrovych Chmerkovskyi) (born March 24, 1986) is a Ukrainian and American professional Latin and ballroom dancer and choreographer. Chmerkovskiy was born in Odesa, Ukraine alongside his brother Maksim Chmerkovskiy. His family immigrated to Brooklyn where he studied dancing and went on to appear on the ABC competition series Dancing with the Stars during its second season in 2006.

Chmerkovskiy was promoted to a pro on the series in 2011. He has won thrice with actress Rumer Willis in 2015, with Olympic artistic gymnast Laurie Hernandez in 2016 and with actress Xochitl Gomez in 2023. He married fellow DWTS dancer Jenna Johnson in 2018.

== Early life ==
Valentin Aleksandrovich Chmerkovskiy was born on March 24, 1986, in Odesa, Ukrainian SSR (present-day Ukraine). His father, Aleksandr "Sasha" Chmerkovskiy, is a Jewish marine merchant, while his mother, Larisa Chmerkovskaya, is a Christian engineer. He has an older brother, Maksim, who is also a professional ballroom dancer.

Chmerkovskiy learned about the principles of dance through his brother. He started taking classical violin lessons when he was five years old and began dance training when he was seven, before he and his family immigrated to Brooklyn, New York in 1994. He continued his training at a youth-oriented dance studio in Bergen County, New Jersey, which was established by his brother and father.

== Career ==
=== Dancesport ===
Chmerkovskiy is the first and only American to win the IDSF Junior and Youth World Championships. Additionally, he is a 14-time U.S. National Latin champion (Junior, U21/Youth, Adult Amateur), a Blackpool Open U21 winner, and an amateur Latin finalist at the Blackpool Dance Festival, UK Open Championships, and the International Championships. In 2001, Chmerkovskiy and his dance partner, Diana Olonetskaya, became the first American dance team to win a world junior championship title.

=== Dancing with the Stars ===
Chmerkovskiy first appeared on the reality competition series Dancing with the Stars in 2006, as one of his brother's students during the second season. He then appeared as a guest dancer on the fourth, tenth and eleventh seasons. Chmerkovskiy was formally promoted to a professional dancer on the series in 2011 for the thirteenth season, where he was partnered with model and actress Elisabetta Canalis. They were the second couple eliminated from the competition, finishing in eleventh place.

In season 14, Chmerkovskiy was partnered with comedian and talk show host Sherri Shepherd. On Rock Week (Week 4) of Dancing with the Stars, they were the third couple to be eliminated, finishing in 10th place.

Chmerkovskiy danced as a professional partner in season 15 with season 1 winner, Kelly Monaco. They finished in third place in the season finale.

For season 16, Chmerkovskiy was partnered with Disney Channel's Shake It Up star, Zendaya. On May 21, they finished as the runners-up behind Derek Hough and Kellie Pickler.

For season 17, he paired with film and television actress Elizabeth Berkley. Despite receiving high scores, including the season's first perfect score, they were unexpectedly eliminated in week 9, finishing in sixth place.

For season 18, he paired with actress and author Danica McKellar. They were eliminated in Week 8 and ended in sixth place.

For season 19, he was paired with Pretty Little Liars actress Janel Parrish. They made it to the finals and finished in third place.

For season 20, he was paired with actress and singer Rumer Willis. On May 19, 2015, Willis and Chmerkovskiy were crowned the winners, marking Chmerkovskiy's first win.

For season 21, he was partnered with R&B singer and reality television star, Tamar Braxton. On November 11, 2015, Braxton revealed that she had to withdraw from the competition due to health issues.

For season 22, he was partnered with meteorologist Ginger Zee. The couple made it to the finals, but ultimately ended in third place.

For season 23, he was partnered with Olympic artistic gymnast Laurie Hernandez. On November 22, Hernandez and Chmerkovskiy won the title, giving Chmerkovskiy his 2nd mirrorball.

For season 24, he was partnered with Fifth Harmony singer Normani. They made it to the finals and finished in third place.

For season 25, he was partnered with former Paralympic swimmer Victoria Arlen. They made it to the semi-finals in week 9 but were then eliminated, finishing in fifth place.

Chmerkovskiy did not return for season 26, but he was revealed to be back for season 27 where he was paired with actress Nancy McKeon. They were the third couple to be eliminated, finishing in 11th place.

For season 28, he returned where he was originally paired with model and actress Christie Brinkley. However, five days before the premiere, she withdrew from the competition due to a broken arm sustained in rehearsals. As a result, Brinkley's daughter and model Sailor Brinkley-Cook stepped in as a replacement. Despite consistently earning high scores, the couple was surprisingly eliminated in week 6 and finished in ninth place.

For season 29, he was paired with cheerleading coach and reality television star Monica Aldama. They were eliminated in Week 7 and finished in seventh place.

For season 30, he was partnered with influencer Olivia Jade. They were eliminated in Week 8 and finished in eighth place.

For season 31, he was partnered with The Bachelorette star Gabby Windey. They made it to the finals and finished in second place behind Charli D'Amelio and Mark Ballas.

For season 32, he was partnered with actress Xochitl Gomez. On December 5, Gomez and Chmerkovskiy won the title, giving Chmerkovskiy his 3rd mirrorball.

For season 33, he was partnered with reality television personality Phaedra Parks. They reached week 5 of competition and finished in 8th place.

For season 34, he was partnered with social media influencer and model Alix Earle. They finished as the runners-up behind Robert Irwin and Witney Carson.

For season 35, he was partnered with actress and dancer Jenna Dewan. Despite topping the leaderboard three times; in the quarter-finals, after scoring two perfect scores the previous week, they were shockingly eliminated, and finished in 7th place.

Season	Partner	Place	Average
13	Elisabetta Canalis	11th	18.0
14	Sherri Shepherd	10th	22.8
15	Kelly Monaco	3rd	26.8
16	Zendaya	2nd	27.3
17	Elizabeth Berkley Lauren	6th	26.5
18	Danica McKellar	6th	26.3
19	Janel Parrish	3rd	27.4
20	Rumer Willis	1st	27.8
21	Tamar Braxton	5th	25.4
22	Ginger Zee	3rd	26.3
23	Laurie Hernandez	1st	27.7
24	Normani	3rd	27.5
25	Victoria Arlen	5th	24.9
27	Nancy McKeon	11th	20.4
28	Sailor Brinkley-Cook	9th	22.2
29	Monica Aldama	10th	22.1
30	Olivia Jade	8th	25.0
31	Gabby Windey	2nd	27.5
32	Xochitl Gomez	1st	27.2
33	Phaedra Parks	8th	22.0
34	Alix Earle	2nd	27.0
35	Jenna Dewan	7th	25.6

Season 13

with Elisabetta Canalis

Week	Dance	Music	Judges' score			Total Score	Result
Week	Dance	Music	Inaba	Goodman	Tonioli	Total Score	Result
1	Cha-cha-cha	"Last Friday Night (T.G.I.F.)" — Katy Perry	5	5	5	15	Safe
2	Quickstep	"Don't Get Me Wrong" — The Pretenders	7	7	7	21	Eliminated

Season 14

with Sherri Shepherd

Week	Dance	Music	Judges' score			Total Score	Result
Week	Dance	Music	Inaba	Goodman	Tonioli	Total Score	Result
1	Foxtrot	"Sherry" — Frankie Valli & The Four Seasons	8	7	8	23	No Elimination
2	Jive	"Proud Mary" — Ike & Tina Turner	8	7	8	23	Safe
3	Rumba	"If I Could" — Regina Belle	8	8	8	24	Safe
4	Tango	"Cum On Feel the Noize" — Quiet Riot	7	7	7	21	Eliminated

Season 15

with Kelly Monaco

Week	Dance	Music	Judges' score			Total Score	Result
Week	Dance	Music	Inaba	Goodman	Tonioli	Total Score	Result
1	Cha-cha-cha	"Bang Bang" — David Sanborn	7.0	7.0	7.5	21.5	Safe
2	Quickstep	"Who Says" — Selena Gomez & the Scene	7.5	7.0	7.5	22.0	Safe
3	Paso doble	"España cañí" — Erich Kunzel	9.0	9.0	9.0	27.0	Safe
4	Contemporary	"Fix You" — Coldplay	9.0	9.5	9.5	37.5 (Note: Kelly and Val also received a score of 9.5 from guest judge Paula Abdul.)	Safe
5	Samba	"Want U Back" — Cher Lloyd	8.0	8.0	8.5	24.5	No Elimination
5	Team Freestyle	"Gangnam Style" — Psy	9.0	9.0	9.0	27.0	No Elimination
6	Tango	"Good Girl" — Carrie Underwood	9.0	9.0	9.0	27.0	Safe
7	Cha-cha-cha & Foxtrot Fusion	"Don't Stop" — Gin Wigmore	9.0	9.0	9.0	27.0	No Elimination
7	Swing Marathon	"Do Your Thing" — Basement Jaxx	+9			9 (Note: Kelly and Val received 9 bonus points from the swing marathon.)	No Elimination
8	Viennese waltz	"I'll Be" — Edwin McCain	9.5	9.0	9.5	28.0	Safe
8	Jive	"Animal" — Neon Trees	9.5	9.5	9.5	28.5	Safe
9	"Surfer" Flamenco	"Malagueña" — Brian Setzer	8.0	9.0	8.5	25.5	Safe
9	Rumba	"I Just Can't Stop Loving You" — Michael Jackson	9.5	9.5	9.5	28.5	Safe
10	Paso doble	"España cañí" — Erich Kunzel	9.5	10.0	10.0	29.5	No Elimination
10	Freestyle	"(I've Had) The Time of My Life" — Bill Medley & Jennifer Warnes	10.0	9.5	10.0	29.5	No Elimination
10	Jive	"Cat and Mouse" — Nikki & Rich	9.5	9.5	9.5	28.5	Third Place

Season 16

with Zendaya

Week	Dance	Music	Judges' score			Total Score	Result
Week	Dance	Music	Inaba	Goodman	Tonioli	Total Score	Result
1	Contemporary	"Feel Again" — OneRepublic	8	8	8	24	No Elimination
2	Jive	"This Head I Hold" — Electric Guest	9	8	9	26	Safe
3	Viennese waltz	"Que Sera, Sera (Whatever Will Be, Will Be)" — Doris Day	8	8	8	24	Safe
3	Group Freestyle	"The Rockafeller Skank" — Fatboy Slim	+2			2 (Note: Zendaya and Val received 2 bonus points from the group freestyle.)	Safe
4	Samba	"Love On Top" — Beyoncé	9	8	9	26	Safe
5	Argentine tango	"Discombobulate" — Hans Zimmer	10	9	10	29	Safe
6	Cha-cha-cha	"Do I Do" — Stevie Wonder	10	9	10	29	Safe
6	Team Paso doble	"Higher Ground" — Stevie Wonder	7	8	7	22	Safe
7	Paso doble	"Buster Voodoo" — Rodrigo y Gabriela	9	9	9	27	Safe
7	Jive Dance-off	"Good Golly Miss Molly" — Little Richard	Winner			3 (Note: Zendaya and Val received 3 bonus points for winning the dance-off.)	Safe
8	Foxtrot	"Don't Worry, Be Happy" — Bobby McFerrin	9	10	9	28	Safe
8	Salsa	"Dança Molengo" — Bonde do Rolê, feat. Rizzle Kicks	10	10	10	30	Safe
9	Quickstep	"Don't Give Up" — Noisettes	8	8	9	25	Safe
9	Hip-hop	"Fine China" — Chris Brown	10	10	10	30	Safe
10	Samba	"Yerbatero" — Juanes	10	10	10	30	Safe
10	Freestyle	"Beauty and a Beat" — Justin Bieber, feat. Nicki Minaj	10	10	10	30	Safe
10	Cha-cha-cha Relay	"Treasure" — Bruno Mars	+5			5 (Note: Zendaya and Val received 5 bonus points from the relay.)	Safe
10	Jive	"Rockin' Robin" — Michael Jackson	10	10	10	30	Runners-up

Season 17

with Elizabeth Berkley Lauren

Week	Dance	Music	Judges' score			Total Score	Result
Week	Dance	Music	Inaba	Goodman	Tonioli	Total Score	Result
1	Contemporary	"Imagine" — John Lennon	8	8	8	24	No Elimination
2	Samba	"Straight to Memphis" — Club des Belugas	8	9	8	25	Safe
3	Foxtrot	"Come Fly with Me" — Frank Sinatra	8	9	8	25	Safe
4	Argentine tango	"Symphony 6: Fair Thee Well & the Requiem Mix" — Emily Wells	9	9	9	27	Safe
5	Jive	"I'm So Excited" — The Pointer Sisters	8	9	9	26	Safe
6	Cha-cha-cha	"Put Your Hands on Me" — Joss Stone	10	10	10	30	No Elimination
6	Megamix	"Sexy and I Know It" — LMFAO "The Blue Danube" — Johann Strauss II "Chillando Goma" — Fulanito "Shake a Tail Feather" — The Blues Brothers	+2			2 (Note: Elizabeth and Val received 2 bonus points from the megamix.)	No Elimination
7	Quickstep	"Dance Apocalyptic" — Janelle Monáe	9	9	9	27	Safe
7	Team Freestyle	"Bom Bom" — Sam and the Womp	9	9	9	27	Safe
8	Jazz	"Bang Bang (My Baby Shot Me Down)" — Cher	8	9	8	25	Safe
8	Cha-cha-cha Dance-off	"Woman's World" — Cher	Loser			0 (Note: Elizabeth and Val did not receive any bonus points for losing the dance-off.)	Safe
9	Viennese waltz	"Young and Beautiful" — Lana Del Rey	9	8	9	26	Eliminated
9	Salsa	"Pucko" — Bonde do Rolê	10	10	10	30	Eliminated

Season 18

with Danica McKellar

Week	Dance	Music	Judges' score			Total Score	Result
Week	Dance	Music	Inaba	Goodman	Tonioli	Total Score	Result
1	Foxtrot	"Walk Away" — Kelly Clarkson	8	8	8	24	No Elimination
2	Samba	"All Nite (Don't Stop)" — Janet Jackson	8	8	8	24	Safe
3	Contemporary	"Lullabye (Goodnight, My Angel)" — Billy Joel	9	9	9	36 (Note: Danica and Val also received a score of 9 from guest judge Robin Roberts.)	No Elimination
4 (Note: Week 4 was switch up week. Danica danced a jive with Val's brother Maks, while Val danced an Argentine tango with Maks' partner, Meryl Davis. Danica's score with Maks went towards her overall total with Val, while Val's score with Meryl went towards her overall total with Maks.)	Jive	"Love Me Right!" — The Swag Geeks, feat. Brook Penning	8	8	8	32 (Note: Danica and Maks also received a score of 8 from guest judge Julianne Hough.)	No Elimination
4	Argentine tango	"Too Close" — Alex Clare	10	9	10	39 (Note: Meryl and Val also received a score of 10 from guest judge Julianne Hough.)	No Elimination
5	Quickstep	"Be Our Guest" — Jerry Orbach & Angela Lansbury	10	9	10	39 (Note: Danica and Val also received a score of 10 from guest judge Donny Osmond.)	Safe
6	Cha-cha-cha	"I Wanna Dance with Somebody (Who Loves Me)" — Whitney Houston	9	9	9	36 (Note: Danica and Val also received a score of 9 from guest judge Redfoo.)	Safe
7	Salsa	"Watch Out for This (Bumaye)" — Major Lazer, feat. Busy Signal, The Flexican & FS Green	8	8	8	33 (Note: Danica and Val also received a score of 9 from guest judge Ricky Martin.)	Safe
7	Team Freestyle	"Livin' la Vida Loca — Ricky Martin	10	9	10	39 (Note: The team dance also received a score of 9 from guest judge Ricky Martin.)	Safe
8	Tango	"Everybody Wants to Rule the World" — Lorde	10	9	10	38 (Note: Danica and Val also received a score of 9 from guest judge Abby Lee Miller.)	Eliminated
8	Team-up Samba	"I Luh Ya Papi" — Jennifer Lopez, feat. French Montana	8	9	9	38 (Note: The team-up samba also received a score of 8 from guest judge Abby Lee Miller.)	Eliminated

Season 19

with Janel Parrish

Week	Dance	Music	Judges' score				Total Score	Result
Week	Dance	Music	Inaba	Goodman	J. Hough	Tonioli	Total Score	Result
1	Jive	"Bang Bang" — Jessie J, Ariana Grande & Nicki Minaj	7	7	7	8	29	Safe
2	Foxtrot	"Call Me Maybe" — Carly Rae Jepsen	9	8	8	9	34	Safe
3	Jazz	"America" — Leonard Bernstein	10	—N/a	10	10	40 (Note: Kevin Hart filled in as a guest judge in Len's spot. Janel and Val also received a score of 10 from him.)	Safe
4	Rumba	"How Will I Know" — Sam Smith	9	—N/a	9	9	36 (Note: Due to Len Goodman's absence, America was able to score each couple from 1-10. Janel and Val received a score of 9 from America.)	Safe
5 (Note: Week 5 was switch up week. Janel danced a burlesque with Artem, while Val performed broadway with Lea Thompson. Janel's score with Artem went towards her overall total with Val.)	Burlesque	"Mamma Knows Best" — Jessie J	8	—N/a	8	9	33 (Note: Jessie J filled in as a guest judge in Len's spot. Janel and Artem also received a score of 8 from her.)	No Elimination
5	Broadway	"You Can't Stop the Beat" — from Hairspray	9	—N/a	8	9	34 (Note: Jessie J filled in as a guest judge in Len's spot. Lea and Val also received a score of 8 from her.)	No Elimination
6	Samba	"La Vida Es Un Carnaval" — Celia Cruz	8	—N/a	9	9	33 (Note: Pitbull filled in as a guest judge in Len's spot. Janel and Val also received a score of 7 from him.)	Safe
7	Viennese waltz	"Secret" — The Pierces	8	7	8	8	31	Safe
7	Team Freestyle	"Black Widow" — Iggy Azalea, feat. Rita Ora	9	9	9	9	36	Safe
8	Contemporary	"Everybody's Free (To Feel Good)" — Quindon Tarver	10	10	10	10	40	Safe
9	Quickstep	"Hey Boy! Hey Girl!" — Louis Prima & Keely Smith	9	10	10	9	38	Safe
9	Salsa	"Morning Drums" — Gregor Salto	10	9	10	10	39	Safe
10	Paso doble	"Blame" — Calvin Harris, feat. John Newman	10	10	10	10	40	Safe
10	Argentine tango	"Blame" — Calvin Harris, feat. John Newman	9	9	10	10	38	Safe
11	Samba	"La Vida Es Un Carnaval" — Celia Cruz	9	10	9	9	37	Bottom Two
11	Freestyle	"I'm Gonna Be (500 Miles)" — Sleeping at Last	10	10	10	10	40	Bottom Two
11	Foxtrot & Paso doble Fusion	"Hideaway" — Kiesza	10	10	10	10	40	Third Place

Season 20

with Rumer Willis

Week	Dance	Music	Judges' score				Total Score	Result
Week	Dance	Music	Inaba	Goodman	J. Hough	Tonioli	Total Score	Result
1	Foxtrot	"Take Me to Church" — Hozier	8	8	8	8	32	No Elimination
2	Cha-cha-cha	"Rumour Has It" — Adele	8	8	8	8	32	Safe
3	Salsa	"Turn the Beat Around" — Gloria Estefan	8	9	8	8	33	Safe
4	Waltz	"Turning Tables" — Adele	9	8	9	9	35	Safe
5	Samba	"Poor Unfortunate Souls" — Pat Carroll	10	9	10	10	39	Safe
6	Jazz	"Bootylicious" — Destiny's Child	8	8	7	9	32	Safe
6	Team Freestyle	"Trouble" — Iggy Azalea, feat. Jennifer Hudson	10	9	10	10	39	Safe
7	Jive	"Dear Future Husband" — Meghan Trainor	8	9	9	9	35	Safe
7	Foxtrot Dance-off	"Orange Colored Sky" — Nat King Cole	Winner				2 (Note: Rumer and Val received 2 bonus points for winning the dance-off.)	Safe
8	Rumba	"Perhaps, Perhaps, Perhaps" — Doris Day	10	10	10	10	40	Safe
8	Paso doble	"Scott & Fran's Paso Doble" — David Hirschfelder & The Bogo Pogo Orchestra	10	10	10	10	40	Safe
9	Viennese waltz	"Earned It" — The Weeknd	10	9	9	10	38	Safe
9	Contemporary	"Theme from Swan Lake, Op. 20" — Pyotr Ilyich Tchaikovsky	10	10	10	—N/a	30 (Note: Since Bruno Tonioli coached Rumer and Val, he did not score the dance.)	Safe
10	Foxtrot	"Take Me to Church" — Hozier	10	10	10	10	40	No Elimination
10	Freestyle	"Toxic" — Rumer Willis	10	10	10	10	40	No Elimination
10	Foxtrot & Paso doble Fusion	"Take You Higher" — Goodwill & Hook n Sling	10	10	10	10	40	Winners

Season 21

with Tamar Braxton

Week	Dance	Music	Judges' score			Total Score	Result
Week	Dance	Music	Inaba	J. Hough	Tonioli	Total Score	Result
1	Quickstep	"Do Your Thing" — Basement Jaxx	8	7	8	23	No Elimination
2	Cha-cha-cha	"We Are Family" — Sister Sledge	8	8	8	24	Safe
2	Charleston	"Living in New York City" — Robin Thicke	8	8	9	25	Safe
3	Tango	"A Beautiful Mine" — RJD2	8	8	8	33 (Note: Tamar and Val also received a score of 9 from guest judge Alfonso Ribeiro.)	Safe
4	Rumba	"King" — Tamar Braxton	9	9	9	27	Safe
5 (Note: Week 5 was switch up week. Tamar danced a samba with Louis van Amstel, while Val danced a cha-cha-cha with Bindi Irwin.)	Samba	"End of Time" — Beyoncé	7	7	7	29 (Note: Tamar and Louis also received a score of 8 from guest judge Maksim Chmerkovskiy.)	No Elimination
5	Cha-cha-cha	"Hold My Hand" — Jess Glynne	9	9	9	37 (Note: Bindi and Val also received a score of 10 from guest judge Maksim Chmerkovskiy.)	No Elimination
6	Jazz	"Rhythm Nation" — Janet Jackson	10	10	10	40 (Note: Tamar and Val also received a score of 10 from guest judge Olivia Newton-John.)	Safe
7	Foxtrot	"People Are Strange" — The Doors	8	8	8	24	Safe
7	Team Freestyle	"This Is Halloween" — Danny Elfman	10	10	10	30	Safe
8	Paso doble	"Born This Way" — Lady Gaga	9	9	10	28	Safe
8	Cha-cha-cha Dance-off	"Fun" — Pitbull, feat. Chris Brown	Loser			0 (Note: Tamar & Val received votes from Julianne and Bruno, but ultimately did not receive any points for losing the dance-off.)	Safe
9	Contemporary	"Wicked Game" — James Vincent McMorrow	8	7	7	22	Withdrew

Season 22

with Ginger Zee

Week	Dance	Music	Judges' score			Total Score	Result
Week	Dance	Music	Inaba	Goodman	Tonioli	Total Score	Result
1	Jive	"Move (You're Steppin' on My Heart)" — Henry Krieger	8	7	8	23	No Elimination
2	Samba	"Sorry (Latino remix)" — Justin Bieber, feat. J. Balvin	7	7	7	21	Safe
3	Contemporary	"Home" — Phillip Phillips	7	7	7	21	Safe
4	Foxtrot	"Belle" — Paige O'Hara	9	9	9	36 (Note: Ginger and Val also received a score of 9 from guest judge Zendaya.)	Safe
5 (Note: Week 5 was switch up week. Ginger danced a salsa with Mark Ballas, while Val performed a Paso doble with Jodie Sweetin. Ginger's score with Mark went towards her overall total with Val.)	Salsa	"La Malanga" — Eddie Palmieri	8	8	8	32 (Note: Ginger and Mark also received a score of 8 from guest judge Maksim Chmerkovskiy.)	No Elimination
5	Paso doble	"Under Control" — Calvin Harris & Alesso, feat. Hurts	9	8	9	35 (Note: Jodie and Val also received a score of 9 from guest judge Maksim Chmerkovskiy.)	No Elimination
6	Jazz	"Nasty" — Janet Jackson	8	8	8	24	Safe
7	Viennese waltz	"I Have Nothing" — Whitney Houston	10	10	10	30	Safe
7	Team Freestyle	"End of Time" "If I Were a Boy" "Crazy in Love" — Beyoncé	8	8	9	24	Safe
8	Argentine tango	"Telephone" — Martynas Levickis	10	10	10	30	Safe
8	Team-up Samba	"Jump in the Line (Shake, Senora)" — Harry Belafonte	10	—N/a	10	29 (Note: Len Goodman coached the team-up challenge, so he did not score it. Instead, the general public scored it on a 1-10 scale, and they were awarded a 9 from the public.)	Safe
9	Paso doble	"Shot Me Down" — David Guetta, feat. Skylar Grey	9	9	9	27	Safe
9	Quickstep	"Fire Under My Feet" — Leona Lewis	9	10	10	29	Safe
10	Contemporary	"Adventure of a Lifetime" — Coldplay	9	10	9	28	No Elimination
10	Freestyle	"Orange Colored Sky" — Nat King Cole	10	10	10	30	No Elimination
10	Argentine tango & Foxtrot Fusion	"Just Like Fire" — Pink	9	9	9	27	Third Place

Season 23

with Laurie Hernandez

Week	Dance	Music	Judges' score				Total Score	Result
Week	Dance	Music	Inaba	Goodman	J. Hough	Tonioli	Total Score	Result
1	Cha-cha-cha	"American Girl" — Bonnie McKee	8	8	7	8	31	No Elimination
2	Jive	"DuckTales Theme" — Mark Mueller	8	8	8	8	32	Safe
3	Tango	"Into the Sunset (Headhunterz radio edit)" — Crystal Lake, feat. Kifi	7	8	8	8	31	Safe
4	Jazz	"The Way You Make Me Feel" — Michael Jackson	10	—N/a	10	10	30 (Note: Due to Len Goodman's absence, scores were given on a 30 point scale.)	Safe
5	Paso doble	"Rise" — Katy Perry	8	—N/a	9	8	25 (Note: Due to Len Goodman's absence, scores were given on a 30 point scale.)	Safe
6	Salsa	"Light It Up" — Major Lazer, feat. Nyla & Fuse ODG	9	—N/a	9	10	37 (Note: Laurie and Val also received a score of 9 from guest judge Pitbull.)	Safe
7	Quickstep	"One Fine Day" — The Chiffons	8	8	9	9	34	Safe
7	Team Freestyle	"Embrace" — Armin van Buuren, feat. Eric Vloeimans	8	9	9	9	35	Safe
8	Viennese waltz	"Pure Imagination" — Jane Monheit	10	—N/a	10	10	30 (Note: Due to Len Goodman's absence, scores were given on a 30 point scale.)	Safe
8	Jive Dance-off	"The Purple People Eater" — Sheb Wooley	Winner				3 (Note: Laurie and Val received 3 bonus points for winning the dance-off. They received votes from all three judges, plus 63% of the public vote.)	Safe
9	Argentine tango	"Cell Block Tango" — Kander and Ebb	10	—N/a	10	10	40 (Note: Laurie and Val also received a score of 10 from guest judge Idina Menzel.)	Safe
9	Team-up Contemporary	"Bird Set Free" — Sia	10	—N/a	10	10	40 (Note: The team-up dance also received a score of 10 from guest judge Idina Menzel.)	Safe
10	Foxtrot	"Hollow" — Tori Kelly	10	—N/a	10	10	30 (Note: Due to Len Goodman's absence, scores were given on a 30 point scale.)	Safe
10	Samba	"Magalenha" —Sérgio Mendes, feat. Carlinhos Brown	10	—N/a	10	10	30 (Note: Due to Len Goodman's absence, scores were given on a 30 point scale.)	Safe
11	Paso doble	"Wicked Ones" — Dorothy	9	10	9	10	38	Safe
11	Freestyle	"Brand New" — Ben Rector	10	10	10	10	40	Safe
11	Argentine tango & Foxtrot Fusion	"We Are the Ones" — Myon	10	10	10	10	40	Winners

Season 24

with Normani

Week	Dance	Music	Judges' score				Total Score	Result
Week	Dance	Music	Inaba	Goodman	J. Hough	Tonioli	Total Score	Result
1	Quickstep	"Good Time Good Life" — Erin Bowman	7	6	7	7	27	No Elimination
2	Cha-cha-cha	"Give Me Your Love" — Sigala, feat. John Newman & Nile Rodgers	8	8	8	8	32	Safe
3	Foxtrot	"Big Spender" — Shirley Bassey	8	8	9	9	34	Safe
4	Rumba	"Impossible" — Fifth Harmony	9	7	8	9	32	Safe
5	Paso doble	"I'll Make a Man Out of You" — Donny Osmond	10	9	10	10	39	Safe
6	Salsa	"When I Grow Up" — The Pussycat Dolls	10	8	—N/a	10	38 (Note: Normani and Val also received a score of 10 from guest judge Nick Carter.)	Safe
6	Team Freestyle	"My Boyfriend's Back" — The Chiffons "No Scrubs" — TLC "Bo$$" — Fifth Harmony	8	8	—N/a	9	38 (Note: The team dance also received a score of 9 from guest judge Nick Carter.)	Safe
7	Argentine tango	"Quizás, Quizás, Quizás" — Andrea Bocelli, feat. Jennifer Lopez	10	10	—N/a	10	40 (Note: Normani and Val also received a score of 10 from guest judge Mandy Moore.)	Safe
8	Contemporary	"Freedom" — Anthony Hamilton & Elayna Boynton	10	10	10	10	40	Safe
8	Jive	"Feeling Alive" — Earl St. Clair	10	9	10	10	39	Safe
9	Viennese waltz	"Desperado" — Rihanna	9	9	9	9	36	Safe
9	Jazz	"What a Wonderful World" — Ray Chew	10	10	10	10	40	Safe
10	Quickstep	"Check It Out" — Oh the Larceny	10	9	9	10	38	No Elimination
10	Freestyle	"What the World Needs Now Is Love" — Andra Day	10	10	10	10	40	No Elimination
10	Argentine tango & Foxtrot Fusion	"There's Nothing Holdin' Me Back" — Shawn Mendes	10	10	10	10	40	Third Place

Season 25

with Victoria Arlen

Week	Dance	Music	Judges' score			Total Score	Result
Week	Dance	Music	Inaba	Goodman	Tonioli	Total Score	Result
1	Jive	"Born Ready" — The Disco Fries, feat. Hope Murphy	7	6	6	19	No Elimination
2	Tango	"Look What You Made Me Do" — Taylor Swift	8	8	8	24	Safe
2	Rumba	"Easy" — Sky Ferreira	7	6	7	20	Safe
3	Quickstep	"Tubthumping" — Chumbawamba	8	7	7	22	No Elimination
4	Foxtrot	"I Lived" — OneRepublic	9	9	9	27	Safe
5	Jazz	"Steamboat Willie Suite" — Wilfred Jackson & Bert Lewis	9	9	9	27	Safe
6	Paso doble	"We Will Rock You" — Queen	8	8	8	31 (Note: Victoria and Val also received a score of 7 from guest judge Shania Twain.)	Safe
7	Viennese waltz	"The Night We Met" — Lord Huron	9	9	9	27	Safe
7	Team Freestyle	"The Phantom of the Opera" — Sarah Brightman & Michael Crawford	10	10	10	30	Safe
8	Argentine tango	"Down" — Marian Hill	8	8	8	24	Safe
8	Jive	"Magic" — B.o.B, feat. Rivers Cuomo	8	8	8	24	Safe
9	Contemporary	"To Build a Home" — The Cinematic Orchestra, feat. Patrick Watson	9	9	9	27	Eliminated
9	Charleston	"Bang Bang" — will.i.am	9	10	10	29	Eliminated

Season 27

with Nancy McKeon

Week	Dance	Music	Judges' score			Total Score	Result
Week	Dance	Music	Inaba	Goodman	Tonioli	Total Score	Result
1	Quickstep	"It Don't Mean a Thing (If It Ain't Got That Swing)" — Club des Belugas	6	6	6	18	Bottom Five
1	Quickstep	"Walking on Sunshine" — Katrina and the Waves	7	7	7	21	Safe
2	Cha-cha-cha	"Uptown Girl" — Billy Joel	7	7	7	21	No Elimination
2	Paso doble	"Storm" (from Kà) — René Dupéré	7	6	7	20	Safe
3	Rumba	"Love Someone" — Lukas Graham	8	7	7	22	Eliminated

Season 28

with Sailor Brinkley-Cook

Week	Dance	Music	Judges' score			Total Score	Result
Week	Dance	Music	Inaba	Goodman	Tonioli	Total Score	Result
1	Foxtrot	"Uptown Girl" — Billy Joel	6	6	6	18	No Elimination
2	Rumba	"Señorita" — Shawn Mendes & Camila Cabello	6	6	6	18	Safe
3	Tango	"Mamma Mia" — Meryl Streep	7	8	8	23	Safe
4	Cha-cha-cha	"Ain't No Mountain High Enough" — Marvin Gaye & Tammi Terrell	7	8	8	31 (Note: Sailor and Val also received a score of 8 from guest judge Leah Remini.)	Safe
5	Viennese waltz	"A Dream Is a Wish Your Heart Makes" — Lily James	8	8	8	24	No Elimination
6	Jive	"Wake Me Up Before You Go-Go" — Wham!	9	9	9	27	Eliminated

Season 29

with Monica Aldama

Week	Dance	Music	Judges' score			Total Score	Result
Week	Dance	Music	Inaba	D. Hough	Tonioli	Total Score	Result
1	Foxtrot	"My Wish" — Rascal Flatts	6	7	6	19	No Elimination
2	Jive	"Shake It Off" — Taylor Swift	5	6	5	16	Safe
3	Viennese waltz	"Part of Your World" — Ray Chew	7	7	7	21	Safe
4	Samba	"Party in the U.S.A." — Miley Cyrus	8	8	8	24	Bottom Two
5	Tango	"Tainted Love" — Soft Cell	9	9	8	26	Safe
6	Rumba	"Have I Told You Lately" — Rod Stewart	9	9	9	27	Safe
7	Jazz	"Fever" — Beyoncé	7	8	7	22	Eliminated

Season 30

with Olivia Jade

Week	Dance	Music	Judges' score				Total Score	Result
Week	Dance	Music	Inaba	Goodman	D. Hough	Tonioli	Total Score	Result
1	Salsa	"Juice" — Lizzo	7	6	6	6	25	No Elimination
2	Viennese waltz	"Better Days" — Ant Clemons & Justin Timberlake	7	6	7	7	27	Safe
3	Tango	"Hold It Against Me" — Britney Spears	8	8	—N/a	8	24 (Note: Due to Derek Hough's absence, scores were given on a 30 point scale.)	Safe
4	Samba	"I Just Can't Wait to Be King" — Jason Weaver, Rowan Atkinson & Laura Williams	8	9	9	9	35	No Elimination
4	Jazz	"Remember Me" — Benjamin Bratt	8	9	9	9	35	Safe
5	Foxtrot	"Summer Nights" — John Travolta & Olivia Newton-John	9	9	9	9	36	Bottom Two
6	Paso doble	"Beggin'" — Måneskin	9	9	9	9	36	Safe
7	Quickstep	"Fat Bottomed Girls" — Queen	10	8	10	10	38	Safe
7	Foxtrot Relay	"Under Pressure" — Queen with David Bowie	+4				4 (Note: Olivia and Val received 4 bonus points from the relay after getting points from all four judges.)	Safe
8	Argentine tango	"Any Time, Any Place" — Janet Jackson	9	9	9	9	36	Eliminated
8	Rumba Dance-off	"That's the Way Love Goes" — Janet Jackson	Loser				0 (Note: Olivia and Val did not receive any votes for losing the dance-off.)	Eliminated

Season 31

with Gabby Windey

Week	Dance	Music	Judges' score				Total Score	Result
Week	Dance	Music	Inaba	Goodman	D. Hough	Tonioli	Total Score	Result
1	Jive	"As It Was" — Harry Styles	7	7	7	7	28	No Elimination
2	Viennese waltz	"Can't Help Falling in Love" — Elvis Presley	8	8	8	8	32	Safe
3	Cha-cha-cha	"Die Another Day" — Madonna	8	8	8	9	33	Safe
4	Quickstep	"Mr. Blue Sky" — Electric Light Orchestra	9	9	9	9	36	Safe
5	Foxtrot	"If the World Should Ever Stop" — JP Cooper	9	9	9	9	36	Safe
5	Tango	"Good Girls Go Bad" — Cobra Starship, feat. Leighton Meester	10	10	10	10	40	Safe
5	Hustle & Lindy Hop Marathon	"Hot Stuff" — Donna Summer "Jump, Jive an' Wail" — The Brian Setzer Orchestra	+6				6 (Note: Gabby and Val received 6 bonus points from the dance marathon.)	Safe
6	Rumba	"Home" — Michael Bublé	9	9	9	10	46 (Note: Gabby and Val also received a score of 9 from guest judge Michael Bublé.)	Safe
7 (Note: Due to Val's absence, Gabby danced with Alan Bersten.)	Argentine tango	"Shivers" — District 78, feat. Mikayla Lynn	10	9	9	10	38	Safe
7	Team Freestyle	"The Witches Are Back" — Bette Midler, Sarah Jessica Parker & Kathy Najimy	8	8	9	8	33	Safe
8	Samba	"Livin' La Vida Loca" — Ricky Martin	10	10	10	10	40	Safe
8	Salsa Relay	"Ain't Gonna Hurt Nobody" — Kid 'n Play	Loser				0 (Note: Gabby and Val did not receive any bonus points for losing the relay.)	Safe
9	Waltz	"I'm Kissing You" — Des'ree	10	10	10	10	40	Safe
9	Paso doble	"Malagueña" — Brian Setzer	10	10	10	10	40	Safe
10	Cha-cha-cha	"I Like It (Like That)" — Pete Rodriguez	10	10	10	10	40	Runners-up
10	Freestyle	"Cell Block Tango" — from Chicago	10	10	10	10	40	Runners-up

Season 32

with Xochitl Gomez

Week	Dance	Music	Judges' score			Total Score	Result
Week	Dance	Music	Inaba	D. Hough	Tonioli	Total Score	Result
1	Cha-cha-cha	"Peanut Butter Jelly" — Galantis	6	6	6	18	No Elimination
2	Salsa	"Don't Go Yet" — Camila Cabello	8	8	8	24	Safe
3	Foxtrot	"My Guy" — Mary Wells	8	8	8	32 (Note: Xochitl and Val also received a score of 8 from guest judge Michael Strahan.)	Safe
4	Paso doble	"Un Poco Loco"	9	9	9	27	Safe
5	Viennese waltz	"Until I Found You" — Stephen Sanchez	9	10	9	28	Safe
6	Contemporary	"Game of Survival" — Ruelle	9	9	9	37 (Note: Xochitl and Val also received a score of 10 from guest judge Niecy Nash-Betts.)	Safe
6	Hustle & Charleston Marathon	"Stayin' Alive" — Bee Gees "Grim Grinning Ghosts" — Kris Bowers	+5			5 (Note: Xochitl and Val received 5 bonus points for winning the dance marathon.)	Safe
7	Jazz	"Hollaback Girl" — Gwen Stefani	9	8	8	34 (Note: Xochitl and Val also received a score of 9 from guest judge Paula Abdul.)	Safe
7	Team Freestyle	"Gangnam Style" — Psy	10	10	10	40 (Note: The team dance also received a score of 10 from guest judge Paula Abdul.)	Safe
8	Tango	"I Wanna Dance with Somebody (Who Loves Me)" — Whitney Houston	10	10	10	40 (Note: Xochitl and Val also received a score of 10 from guest judge Billy Porter.)	Safe
8	Cha-cha-cha Dance-off	"So Emotional" — Whitney Houston	Loser			0 (Note: Xochitl and Val did not receive any bonus points for losing the dance-off.)	Safe
9	Quickstep	"Paper Rings" — Taylor Swift	9	9	10	38 (Note: Xochitl and Val also received a score of 10 from guest judge Mandy Moore.)	Safe
9	Viennese waltz Relay	"Lover" — Taylor Swift	Winner			3 (Note: Xochitl and Val received 3 bonus points for winning the dance relay.)	Safe
10	Samba	"Samba" — Gloria Estefan	10	10	10	30	No Elimination
10	Waltz	"La Vie en rose" — Lady Gaga	10	10	10	30	No Elimination
11	Foxtrot	"Unconditionally" — Katy Perry	10	10	10	30	Winners
11	Freestyle	"Que Calor" — District 78	10	10	10	30	Winners

Season 33

with Phaedra Parks

Week	Dance	Music	Judges' score			Total Score	Result
Week	Dance	Music	Inaba	D. Hough	Tonioli	Total Score	Result
1	Cha-cha-cha	"I'm Every Woman" — Whitney Houston	7	6	6	19	No Elimination
2	Foxtrot	"And I Am Telling You I'm Not Going" — Jennifer Hudson	7	7	7	21	Safe
3	Quickstep	"Think" — Aretha Franklin	8	7	7	30 (Note: Phaedra and Val also received a score of 8 from guest judge Rosie Perez.)	No Elimination
3	Paso doble	"You Give Love a Bad Name" — Bon Jovi	7	7	7	26 (Note: Phaedra and Val also received a score of 5 from guest judge Gene Simmons.)	Safe
4	Rumba	"Because You Loved Me" — Celine Dion	8	8	8	32 (Note: Phaedra and Val also received a score of 8 from guest judge Mark Ballas.)	Safe
5	Jazz	"Cruella De Vil"	8	8	8	24	Eliminated
5	Team Freestyle	"I Just Can't Wait to Be King"	8	8	8	24	Eliminated

Season 34

with Alix Earle

Week	Dance	Music	Judges' score			Total Score	Result
Week	Dance	Music	Inaba	D. Hough	Tonioli	Total Score	Result
1	Cha-cha-cha	"Circus" — Britney Spears	—N/a	7	6	13 (Note: Due to Carrie Ann Inaba's absence, scores were given on a 20 point scale.)	No Elimination
2	Jive	"Mambo No. 5" — Lou Bega	7	7	7	21	Safe
3	Quickstep	"Pop Muzik" — M/Robin Scott	8	7	8	23	Safe
4	Viennese waltz	"Once Upon a Dream"	8	8	8	24	Safe
5	Contemporary	"Sparks" — Coldplay	8	9	9	35 (Note: Alix and Val also received a score of 9 from guest judge Kym Johnson.)	Safe
6	Jazz	"What Is This Feeling?" — Ariana Grande & Cynthia Erivo	9	9	9	35 (Note: Alix and Val also received a score of 8 from guest judge Jon M. Chu.)	Safe
7	Tango	"Bury a Friend" — Billie Eilish	10	10	10	39 (Note: Alix and Val also received a score of 9 from guest judge Cheryl Burke.)	Safe
7	Hustle & Lindy Hop Marathon	"Murder on the Dancefloor" — Sophie Ellis-Bextor "A Little Party Never Killed Nobody (All We Got)" — Fergie, Q-Tip, & GoonRock	+4			4 (Note: Alix and Val received 4 bonus points from the dance marathon.)	Safe
8	Paso doble	"Livin' on a Prayer" — Bon Jovi	10	10	10	39 (Note: Alix and Val also received a score of 9 from guest judge Flavor Flav.)	Safe
8	Team Freestyle	"Celebration" — Kool & the Gang	9	10	9	38 (Note: The team dance also received a score of 10 from guest judge Flavor Flav.)	Safe
9	Foxtrot	"Singin' in the Rain" — Matthew Morrison	10	10	10	40 (Note: Alix and Val also received a score of 10 from guest judge Tom Bergeron.)	Safe
9	Jive Relay (Note: Alix performed the relay with Joey Graziadei)	"Dance with Me Tonight" — Olly Murs	Loser			0 (Note: Alix and Val did not receive any bonus points for losing the dance relay.)	Safe
10	Argentine tango	"Little Red Corvette" — Prince	9	10	9	28	Safe
10	Viennese waltz	"Purple Rain" — Prince	10	10	10	30	Safe
11	Samba	"Hip Hip Chin Chin" — Club des Belugas	10	10	10	30	Runners-up
11	Cha-cha-cha	"Where Is My Husband" — RAYE	10	10	10	30	Runners-up
11	Freestyle	"Maneater" — Nelly Furtado "Sports Car" — Tate McRae	10	10	10	30	Runners-up

Season 35

with Jenna Dewan

Week #	Dance	Song	Judges' score			Total	Result
Week #	Dance	Song	Inaba	D. Hough	Tonioli	Total	Result
1	Tango	"Call Me" – Blondie	6	6	7	19	Safe
2	Jive	"Animal" – KATSEYE	7	7	7	21	Safe
3	Samba	"Africa" – Toto	7	7	7	21	Safe
4	Rumba	"My All" – Mariah Carey	8	8	8	24	Safe
5	Paso Doble	"Bad Romance" – Lady Gaga	9	9	9	36 (Note: Jenna and Val also received a score of 9 from guest judge Joe Buck)	Safe
7	Argentine Tango	“Uninvited” – Damned Anthem and Kendra Dantes	9	10	9	37 (Note: Jenna and Val received a score of 9 from guest judge Shirley Ballas)	Safe
8	Quickstep	"Be Our Guest" — from Beauty and the Beast	10	10	10	40 (Note: Jenna and Val received a score of 10 from guest judge Cynthia Erivo)	Safe
8	Team Freestyle	"We're All In This Together" — from High School Musical	10	10	10	40 (Note: Team Wildcats received a score of 10 from guest judge Cynthia Erivo)	Safe
9	Jazz	"All For You" – Janet Jackson	10	9	9	28	Eliminated
9	Cha-cha-cha dance off	"The Middle" – Zedd, Maren Morris, and Grey	+2			2	Eliminated

- Chmerkovskiy was suspended for one week and did not dance on Dedication Night for week 6 of the competition.

=== Other reality television appearances ===
In 2019, Chmerkovskiy appeared on an episode Say Yes to the Dress with his now-wife, Jenna Johnson.

In April 2025, Chmerkovskiy appeared in the Hulu series Got to Get Out. He remained 'inside' until the end of the show.

In December 2025, it was announced Chmerkovskiy would appear on season 30 of the Food Network show Worst Cooks in America.

== Personal life ==
Chmerkovskiy owns nine social dance studios in the New York metropolitan area, Texas and Nevada with his brother.

In 2015, Chmerkovskiy began an on and off relationship with fellow DWTS dancer Jenna Johnson. In 2017, he confirmed that he and Johnson were dating again. On June 15, 2018, the couple shared their engagement on Instagram. They were married on April 13, 2019. On July 15, 2022, Chmerkovskiy and Johnson announced that they were pregnant with their first child, due in January 2023. Their son, Rome Valentin Chmerkovskiy, was born on January 10, 2023.

== Controversies ==
=== Lawsuit involving ableist comments ===
In January 2016, Chmerkovskiy was sued for $6 million after he shared an ableist meme of an 8-year-old girl with down syndrome on social media with the caption “letting your kid become obese should be considered child abuse”. According to attorney Larry Crain, “The right to free expression is not a license to inflict injury and humiliation on an innocent and defenseless child or adult with Down syndrome”. Chmerkovskiy has since deleted the meme from his social media after being faced with the lawsuit.

=== Cultural Appropriation ===
On October 3rd 2026, Chmerkovskiy was accused of cultural appropriation after he shared on social media that he styled his hair into cornrows, a traditional braiding hairstyle that originated in Africa. Chmerkovskiy took out the cornrows ahead of the Mariah Carey Night episode of season 35. Despite the online criticism, Chmerkovskiy defended his cornrows. In a post-episode interview with Us Weekly, he stated, “There’s nothing to talk about, [other than] the fact that I love the way it looked. I love the process of getting to know the importance of it, and I got to support a local Black business. They did a fine job, and I’m proud of everything I did.” Chmerkovskiy further added, “Today is about my partner and I didn’t want to distract from her moment and her dance. Whether it is a positive light or negative the light should be on her [tonight].”

=== Carrie-Ann Inaba-Will Smith incident ===
Following the October 13th episode of season 35, Chmerkovskiy took to social media in response to DWTS judge Carrie Ann Inaba's critiques towards his wife Jenna Johnson's choreography with her celebrity partner Harry Shum Jr. In a now-deleted TikTok story, he wrote, “You almost saw Fresh Prince enter the ballroom last night”, which referenced Smith's previous role on The Fresh Prince of Bel-Air. The comment drew harsh criticism from fans and the media with it also being a direct reference to the Will Smith's infamous Oscars slap against Chris Rock. Inaba was made aware of his comment and responded on Instagram and stated, “So this is what we are doing now?”, thanking news outlets for bringing them to her attention.

==== Apology and suspension ====
On October 15, 2026, Chmerkovskiy issued a formal apology to Inaba after he made inappropriate comments on social media against her. Two days later, it was revealed that Chmerkovskiy received a one-week suspension and would not participate in the October 20th episode due to his comments. Though some outlets falsely reported the suspension was due to an HR complaint filed by Inaba, it was later confirmed that the comment itself triggered an investigation by BBC Studios, the production company behind DWTS. BBC later released a statement saying in part, “The well-being of everyone who works on Dancing With the Stars is non-negotiable. Val’s social media post was inappropriate and does not reflect the values or standards expected of anyone connected with the show.” This outcome marked the first time a celebrity or professional dancer had been suspended in the series' history. Consequently, Chmerkovskiy's celebrity partner Jenna Dewan danced with DWTS pro dancer Alan Bersten, who had been eliminated earlier in the season. Chmerkovskiy and Dewan were ultimately eliminated on November 10th, despite finishing near the top of the judges' leaderboard.

== Notes ==
Awards and achievements
Preceded by Alfonso Ribeiro & Witney Carson; Nyle DiMarco & Peta Murgatroyd; Charli D'Amelio & Mark Ballas	Dancing with the Stars (US) winner Season 20 (Spring 2015 with Rumer Willis); Season 23 (Fall 2016 with Laurie Hernandez); Season 32 (Fall 2023 with Xochitl Gomez)	Succeeded by Bindi Irwin & Derek Hough; Rashad Jennings & Emma Slater; Joey Graziadei & Jenna Johnson
Preceded by Shawn Johnson & Derek Hough; JoJo Siwa & Jenna Johnson; Ilona Maher & Alan Bersten	Dancing with the Stars (US) runner-up Season 16 (Spring 2013 with Zendaya); Season 31 (Fall 2022 with Gabby Windey); Season 34 (Fall 2025 with Alix Earle)	Succeeded by Corbin Bleu & Karina Smirnoff; Jason Mraz & Daniella Karagach; TBD
Preceded by William Levy & Cheryl Burke; Candace Cameron Bure & Mark Ballas; Alek Skarlatos & Lindsay Arnold; Calvin Johnson Jr. & Lindsay Arnold	Dancing with the Stars (US) third place Season 15 (Fall 2012 with Kelly Monaco); Season 19 (Fall 2014 with Janel Parrish); Season 22 (Spring 2016 with Ginger Zee); Season 24 (Spring 2017 with Normani Kordei)	Succeeded by Jacoby Jones & Karina Smirnoff; Noah Galloway & Sharna Burgess; Calvin Johnson Jr. & Lindsay Arnold; Frankie Muniz & Witney Carson
Preceded by Simone Biles & Sasha Farber	Dancing with the Stars (US) semi-finalist Season 25 (Fall 2017 with Victoria Arlen)	Succeeded by Mirai Nagasu & Alan Bersten; Chris Mazdzer & Witney Carson; Jennie Finch Daigle & Keo Motsepe
Preceded by Kim Zolciak-Biermann & Tony Dovolani	Dancing with the Stars (US) withdrew Season 21 (Fall 2015 with Tamar Braxton)	Succeeded by Ray Lewis & Cheryl Burke
