= Dancing with the Stars (American TV series) season 28 =

Season 28 of Dancing with the Stars

Dancing with the Stars
- Season 28
- Promotional poster featuring the celebrities
- Hosted by: Tom Bergeron; Erin Andrews
- Judges: Carrie Ann Inaba; Len Goodman; Bruno Tonioli
- Celebrity winner: Hannah Brown
- Professional winner: Alan Bersten
- No. of episodes: 11

Release
- Original network: ABC
- Original release: September 16 – November 25, 2019

Season chronology
- ← Previous; Season 27 Next → Season 29

Season twenty-eight of Dancing with the Stars premiered on September 19, 2019, on the ABC network.

On November 25, The Bachelorette star Hannah Brown and Alan Bersten were crowned the champions, while actor and comedian Kel Mitchell and Witney Carson finished in second place, singer Ally Brooke and Sasha Farber finished in third place, and singer Lauren Alaina and Gleb Savchenko finished in fourth.

This marked the last season for co-hosts Tom Bergeron and Erin Andrews.

== Cast ==
=== Couples ===
This season featured twelve celebrity contestants. For the first time, the couples were not announced in advance, but were revealed during the season premiere. On August 19, 2019, Peta Murgatroyd announced that she would be returning as a professional. On August 21, the cast was revealed on Good Morning America. Artem Chigvintsev and Sharna Burgess did not return for this season. Two new dancers, Daniella Karagach and Pasha Pashkov, were added to the pro line-up. However, there was no dance troupe this season.

On September 16, it was announced that Christie Brinkley had to withdraw from the competition due to an injury sustained during rehearsal. Her daughter, Sailor Brinkley-Cook, took her place.

Celebrity	Notability	Professional partner	Status	Ref.
Mary Wilson	The Supremes singer	Brandon Armstrong	Eliminated 1st on September 23, 2019	
Ray Lewis	NFL linebacker for Baltimore Ravens	Cheryl Burke	Withdrew on September 30, 2019	
Lamar Odom	NBA forward	Peta Murgatroyd	Eliminated 2nd on October 7, 2019	
Sailor Brinkley-Cook	Model & daughter of Christie Brinkley	Valentin Chmerkovskiy	Eliminated 3rd on October 21, 2019	
Karamo Brown	Queer Eye cast member & activist	Jenna Johnson	Eliminated 4th on October 28, 2019	
Kate Flannery	The Office actress	Pasha Pashkov	Eliminated 5th on November 4, 2019	
Sean Spicer	White House Press Secretary	Lindsay Arnold; Jenna Johnson (Weeks 8-9)	Eliminated 6th on November 11, 2019	
James Van Der Beek	Dawson's Creek actor	Emma Slater	Eliminated 7th on November 18, 2019	
Lauren Alaina	Country singer	Gleb Savchenko	Fourth place on November 25, 2019	
Ally Brooke	Fifth Harmony singer	Sasha Farber	Third place on November 25, 2019	
Kel Mitchell	Actor & comedian	Witney Carson	Runners-up on November 25, 2019	
Hannah Brown	The Bachelorette star	Alan Bersten	Winners on November 25, 2019	

=== Hosts and judges ===
Tom Bergeron and Erin Andrews returned as hosts, while Carrie Ann Inaba, Len Goodman, and Bruno Tonioli, returned as judges.

== Episodes ==
No. overall	No. in season	Title	Rating (18–49)	Original release date	U.S. viewers (millions)
438	1	"First Dances"	1.03	September 16, 2019	8.07
439	2	"First Elimination"	0.77	September 23, 2019	6.40
440	3	"Movie Night"	0.80	September 30, 2019	6.58
441	4	"Top 10"	0.80	October 7, 2019	6.68
442	5	"Disney Night"	0.91	October 14, 2019	6.61
443	6	"Week 6"	0.73	October 21, 2019	6.28
444	7	"Halloween Night"	0.89	October 28, 2019	6.40
445	8	"Dance-Off Week"	0.78	November 4, 2019	6.20
446	9	"Boy Band & Girl Group Night"	0.90	November 11, 2019	6.75
447	10	"Semifinals"	0.79	November 18, 2019	6.63
448	11	"Finale"	1.07	November 25, 2019	7.79

== Scoring chart ==
The highest score each week is indicated in bold green with a dagger (†), while the lowest score each week is indicated in italicized red with a double-dagger (‡).

Color key:

Winners
Runners-up
Third place
Fourth place
Bottom two
Withdrew from competition
Eliminated

Dancing with the Stars (season 28) - Weekly scores
Couple	Pl.	Week													
Couple	Pl.	1	2	1+2	3	4 (Note: The couples were scored on a 40-point scale due to the presence of a guest judge.)	3+4	5	6	5+6	7	8	9	10	11
Hannah & Alan	1st	20	**24**†	**44**†	21	**32**†	53	25	24	49	25+27=52	29+2=31	32+39=71	27+27=54	28+30=58 (Note: This couple finished in first place.)
Kel & Witney	2nd	16	20	36	20 (Note: This couple was in the bottom two, but was not eliminated.)	**32**†	52	26	26	52	27+24=51	28+2=30	34+40=74	27+30=57	30+29=59 (Note: This couple finished in second place.)
Ally & Sasha	3rd	16	20	36	**24**†	**32**†	**56**†	**27**†	25	52	27+27=**54**†	30	40+40=**80**†	29+30=**59**†	30+30=**60**† (Note: This couple finished in third place.)
Lauren & Gleb	4th	19	19	38	20	**32**†	52	23	26	49	27+27=**54**†	24	34+36=70	27+27=54	27+30=57‡ (Note: This couple finished in fourth place.)
James & Emma	5th	**21**†	20	41	23	28	51	26	**27**†	**53**†	27+27=**54**†	30+2=**32**†	36+36=72	24+27=51‡ (Note: This couple was eliminated.)	
Sean & Lindsay	6th	12	16	28	15	21	36	19‡	21‡	40‡	18+24=42‡	20‡	26+24=50‡		
Kate & Pasha	7th	15	21	36	**24**†	26	50	24	**27**†	51	24+24=48	24+2=26			
Karamo & Jenna	8th	17	19	36	16	28	44	21	25	46	25+24=49				
Sailor & Val	9th	18	18	36	23	31	54	24	**27**†	51					
Lamar & Peta	10th	11‡	12‡	23‡	12‡	20‡	32‡								
Ray & Cheryl	11th	15	15	30	(Note: This couple withdrew from the competition.)										
Mary & Brandon	12th	17	15	32											

== Weekly scores ==
Individual judges' scores in the charts below (given in parentheses) are listed in this order from left to right: Carrie Ann Inaba, Len Goodman, Bruno Tonioli.

=== Week 1: First Dances ===
The couples danced the cha-cha-cha, foxtrot, salsa, or tango. Couples are listed in the order they performed.

For the first time in the show's history, the official partnerships were revealed to the public during the live broadcast.

Couple	Scores	Dance	Music
Hannah & Alan	20 (7, 7, 6)	Cha-cha-cha	"I Wanna Dance with Somebody" — Whitney Houston
Kel & Witney	16 (6, 5, 5)	Tango	"Sucker" — Jonas Brothers
Kate & Pasha	15 (5, 5, 5)	Cha-cha-cha	"She Works Hard for the Money" — Donna Summer
Lamar & Peta	11 (5, 3, 3)	Foxtrot	"Feeling Good" — Michael Bublé
Lauren & Gleb	19 (7, 6, 6)	Cha-cha-cha	"Man! I Feel Like a Woman!" — Shania Twain
Sailor & Val	18 (6, 6, 6)	Foxtrot	"Uptown Girl" — Billy Joel
Karamo & Jenna	17 (6, 5, 6)	Salsa	"Juice" — Lizzo
Ray & Cheryl	15 (5, 5, 5)	Salsa	"Hot in Herre" — Nelly
Mary & Brandon	17 (6, 5, 6)	Foxtrot	"Baby Love" — The Supremes
Ally & Sasha	16 (5, 5, 6)	Cha-cha-cha	"Work from Home" — Fifth Harmony
Sean & Lindsay	12 (4, 4, 4)	Salsa	"Spice Up Your Life" — Spice Girls
James & Emma	21 (7, 7, 7)	Tango	"Whatever It Takes" — Imagine Dragons

=== Week 2: First Elimination ===
The couples performed one unlearned dance, and are listed in the order they performed.

Two new format changes were introduced for the remainder of the season: live voting during the broadcast (only available to viewers in the Central and Eastern time zones), and a judges' save for one of the bottom two couples.

Couple	Scores	Dance	Music	Result
James & Emma	20 (7, 6, 7)	Cha-cha-cha	"Dancing on the Ceiling" — Lionel Richie	Safe
Sailor & Val	18 (6, 6, 6)	Rumba	"Señorita" — Shawn Mendes & Camila Cabello	Safe
Ray & Cheryl	15 (5, 5, 5)	Foxtrot	"September" — Earth, Wind & Fire	Bottom two
Ally & Sasha	20 (7, 6, 7)	Viennese waltz	"Iris" — Kina Grannis	Safe
Mary & Brandon	15 (5, 5, 5)	Cha-cha-cha	"Think" — Aretha Franklin	Eliminated
Lauren & Gleb	19 (6, 6, 7)	Paso doble	"Confident" — Demi Lovato	Safe
Sean & Lindsay	16 (6, 5, 5)	Tango	"Shut Up and Dance" — Walk the Moon	Safe
Karamo & Jenna	19 (7, 5, 7)	Quickstep	"Let's Go Crazy" — Prince & The Revolution	Safe
Kate & Pasha	21 (7, 7, 7)	Foxtrot	"Fly Me to the Moon" — Frank Sinatra	Safe
Kel & Witney	20 (7, 6, 7)	Samba	"Every Little Step" — Bobby Brown	Safe
Lamar & Peta	12 (4, 4, 4)	Salsa	"Con Calma" — Daddy Yankee, feat. Snow	Safe
Hannah & Alan	24 (8, 8, 8)	Viennese waltz	"Lover" — Taylor Swift	Safe

Judges' votes to save

- Carrie Ann: Mary & Brandon
- Bruno: Ray & Cheryl
- Len: Ray & Cheryl

=== Week 3: Movie Night ===
The couples performed one unlearned dance to famous film songs, and are listed in the order they performed.

At the beginning of the show, it was announced that Ray Lewis had withdrawn from the competition due to an injury sustained in rehearsals. His dance partner, Cheryl Burke, performed their routine during the live show with season 24 winner Rashad Jennings as a stand-in. There was no additional elimination.

Couple	Scores	Dance	Music	Film	Result
Lauren & Gleb	20 (6, 7, 7)	Tango	"Oh, Pretty Woman" — Roy Orbison	Pretty Woman	Safe
Hannah & Alan	21 (7, 7, 7)	Rumba	"Hold On" — Wilson Phillips	Bridesmaids	Safe
Karamo & Jenna	16 (5, 5, 6)	Jive	"I'm Still Standing" — Elton John	Rocketman	Safe
Ally & Sasha	24 (8, 8, 8)	Rumba	"Dreaming of You" — Selena	Selena	Safe
James & Emma	23 (8, 7, 8)	Rumba	"Shallow" — Lady Gaga & Bradley Cooper	A Star Is Born	Safe
Kate & Pasha	24 (8, 8, 8)	Quickstep	"9 to 5" — Dolly Parton	9 to 5	Safe
Lamar & Peta	12 (4, 4, 4)	Cha-cha-cha	"Old Time Rock and Roll" — Bob Seger	Risky Business	Bottom two
Sailor & Val	23 (7, 8, 8)	Tango	"Mamma Mia" — Meryl Streep	Mamma Mia!	Safe
Kel & Witney	20 (7, 6, 7)	Rumba	"My Heart Will Go On" — Celine Dion	Titanic	Bottom two
Sean & Lindsay	15 (5, 5, 5)	Cha-cha-cha	"Night Fever" — Bee Gees	Saturday Night Fever	Safe

=== Week 4: Top 10 ===
Individual judges' scores in the chart below (given in parentheses) are listed in this order from left to right: Carrie Ann Inaba, Leah Remini, Len Goodman, Bruno Tonioli.

The couples performed one unlearned dance. Couples are listed in the order they performed.

Season 17 semifinalist Leah Remini served as a guest judge for this week.

Couple	Scores	Dance	Music	Result
Sean & Lindsay	21 (5, 6, 5, 5)	Paso doble	"Bamboléo" — Gipsy Kings	Safe
Ally & Sasha	32 (8, 8, 8, 8)	Jive	"Proud Mary" — Tina Turner	Safe
Kel & Witney	32 (8, 8, 8, 8)	Cha-cha-cha	"If I Can't Have You" — Shawn Mendes	Safe
Kate & Pasha	26 (7, 7, 6, 6)	Argentine tango	"Hands to Myself" — Selena Gomez	Safe
James & Emma	28 (7, 7, 7, 7)	Quickstep	"Walking on Sunshine" — Katrina and the Waves	Safe
Hannah & Alan	32 (8, 8, 8, 8)	Paso doble	"I Love It" — Icona Pop, feat. Charli XCX	Safe
Lamar & Peta	20 (5, 7, 4, 4)	Viennese waltz	"Kiss from a Rose" — Seal	Eliminated
Sailor & Val	31 (7, 8, 8, 8)	Cha-cha-cha	"Ain't No Mountain High Enough" — Marvin Gaye & Tammi Terrell	Safe
Lauren & Gleb	32 (8, 8, 8, 8)	Foxtrot	"Jolene" — Dolly Parton	Safe
Karamo & Jenna	28 (7, 7, 7, 7)	Tango	"Old Town Road" — Lil Nas X, feat. Billy Ray Cyrus	Bottom two

Judges' votes to save

- Carrie Ann: Karamo & Jenna
- Bruno: Karamo & Jenna
- Len: Did not vote, but would have voted to save Karamo & Jenna

=== Week 5: Disney Night ===
The couples performed one unlearned dance to songs from Disney films. No elimination took place this week. Couples are listed in the order they performed.

Couple	Scores	Dance	Music	Disney film
Sailor & Val	24 (8, 8, 8)	Viennese waltz	"A Dream Is a Wish Your Heart Makes" — Lily James	Cinderella
Karamo & Jenna	21 (7, 7, 7)	Samba	"I Just Can't Wait to Be King" — JD McCrary, Shahadi Wright Joseph & John Oliver	The Lion King
Kate & Pasha	24 (8, 8, 8)	Jazz	"A Spoonful of Sugar" — Julie Andrews	Mary Poppins
Sean & Lindsay	19 (7, 6, 6)	Quickstep	"You've Got a Friend in Me" — Randy Newman	Toy Story
Ally & Sasha	27 (9, 9, 9)	Contemporary	"Beauty and the Beast" — Ariana Grande & John Legend	Beauty and the Beast
Lauren & Gleb	23 (8, 7, 8)	Samba	"Under the Sea" — Samuel E. Wright	The Little Mermaid
Kel & Witney	26 (9, 8, 9)	Jazz	"We're All in This Together" — from High School Musical	High School Musical
Hannah & Alan	25 (9, 7, 9)	Foxtrot	"A Whole New World" — Zayn & Zhavia Ward	Aladdin
James & Emma	26 (9, 8, 9)	Paso doble	"He's a Pirate" — Klaus Badelt	Pirates of the Caribbean: The Curse of the Black Pearl

=== Week 6 ===
The couples performed one unlearned dance. Couples are listed in the order they performed.

Couple	Scores	Dance	Music	Result
Ally & Sasha	25 (8, 9, 8)	Quickstep	"Take On Me" — A-ha	Bottom two
Kate & Pasha	27 (9, 9, 9)	Viennese waltz	"I Have Nothing" — Whitney Houston	Safe
Kel & Witney	26 (9, 8, 9)	Quickstep	"Part-Time Lover" — Stevie Wonder	Safe
Karamo & Jenna	25 (9, 8, 8)	Contemporary	"Someone You Loved" — Lewis Capaldi	Safe
Hannah & Alan	24 (8, 8, 8)	Samba	"Southbound" — Carrie Underwood	Safe
Sailor & Val	27 (9, 9, 9)	Jive	"Wake Me Up Before You Go-Go" — Wham!	Eliminated
Sean & Lindsay	21 (7, 7, 7)	Viennese waltz	"Somebody to Love" — Queen	Safe
James & Emma	27 (9, 9, 9)	Samba	"Light It Up" — Major Lazer, feat. Nyla & Fuse ODG	Safe
Lauren & Gleb	26 (9, 8, 9)	Contemporary	"The Other Side" — Lauren Alaina	Safe

Judges' votes to save

- Carrie Ann: Ally & Sasha
- Bruno: Ally & Sasha
- Len: Did not vote

=== Week 7: Halloween Night ===
The couples performed one unlearned dance and a team dance. Couples are listed in the order they performed.

Couple	Scores	Dance	Music	Result
Kel & Witney	27 (9, 9, 9)	Jive	"Time Warp" — from The Rocky Horror Picture Show	Safe
James & Emma	27 (9, 9, 9)	Viennese waltz	"I Put a Spell on You" — Annie Lennox	Safe
Ally & Sasha	27 (9, 9, 9)	Tango	"Sweet but Psycho" — Ava Max	Safe
Hannah & Alan	25 (8, 9, 8)	Jazz	"Bad Girls" — Donna Summer	Safe
Karamo & Jenna	25 (9, 8, 8)	Paso doble	"Survivor" — 2WEI	Eliminated
Lauren & Gleb	27 (9, 9, 9)	Argentine tango	"Whatever Lola Wants" — Gotan Project	Safe
Sean & Lindsay	18 (6, 6, 6)	Jive	"Monster Mash" — Bobby Pickett	Safe
Kate & Pasha	24 (8, 8, 8)	Rumba	"Wicked Game" — Chris Isaak	Bottom two
Ally & Sasha Hannah & Alan James & Emma Lauren & Gleb	27 (9, 9, 9)	Freestyle (Team Trick)	"Somebody's Watching Me" — Rockwell	
Karamo & Jenna Kate & Pasha Kel & Witney Sean & Lindsay	24 (8, 8, 8)	Freestyle (Team Treat)	"Sweet Dreams" — Beyoncé	

Judges' votes to save

- Carrie Ann: Karamo & Jenna
- Bruno: Kate & Pasha
- Len: Kate & Pasha

=== Week 8: Dance-Off Week ===
The couples performed one unlearned dance and participated in paired dance-offs for extra points. Due to being on top of the previous week's leader board and holding the highest average of the season this far, James & Emma earned immunity from competing in the dance-off and automatically received two bonus points, though they were explicitly not immune from elimination. Couples are listed in the order they performed.

Lindsay Arnold was absent for two weeks while mourning the death of her mother-in-law. Sean Spicer performed instead with Jenna Johnson.

Couple	Scores	Dance	Music	Result
Sean & Jenna	20 (7, 7, 6)	Jazz	"Come Sail Away" — Styx	Safe
Lauren & Gleb	24 (8, 8, 8)	Jive	"Hound Dog" — Elvis Presley	Safe
Kel & Witney	28 (9, 9, 10)	Salsa	"This Is How We Do It" — Montell Jordan	Safe
Ally & Sasha	30 (10, 10, 10)	Paso doble	"Higher" — Ally Brooke, feat. Matoma	Bottom two
Hannah & Alan	29 (10, 9, 10)	Quickstep	"American Girl" — Elle King	Safe
Kate & Pasha	24 (8, 8, 8)	Jive	"Heat Wave" — Linda Ronstadt	Eliminated
James & Emma	30 (10, 10, 10)	Contemporary	"Don't Stop Believin'" — Ray Chew	Safe

Dance-offs
Couple	Dance	Music	Result
Kel & Witney	Jive	"Don't Stop Me Now" — Queen	Winners
Ally & Sasha	Jive	"Don't Stop Me Now" — Queen	Losers
Kate & Pasha	Cha-cha-cha	"Gonna Make You Sweat (Everybody Dance Now)" — C+C Music Factory	Winners
Sean & Jenna	Cha-cha-cha	"Gonna Make You Sweat (Everybody Dance Now)" — C+C Music Factory	Losers
Hannah & Alan	Salsa	"Rhythm Is Gonna Get You" — Gloria Estefan & Miami Sound Machine	Winners
Lauren & Gleb	Salsa	"Rhythm Is Gonna Get You" — Gloria Estefan & Miami Sound Machine	Losers

Judges' votes to save

- Carrie Ann: Ally & Sasha
- Bruno: Ally & Sasha
- Len: Did not vote, but would have voted to save Ally & Sasha

=== Week 9: Boy Band & Girl Group Night ===
Individual judges' scores in the chart below (given in parentheses) are listed in this order from left to right: Carrie Ann Inaba, Len Goodman, Joey Fatone, Bruno Tonioli.

The couples performed two unlearned dances to songs from famous girl groups (the first round) and boy bands (the second round). Couples are listed in the order they performed.

NSYNC member Joey Fatone, who competed on both season 4 and season 15, served as a guest judge for the week.

For the second consecutive week, Sean Spicer performed with Jenna Johnson.

Couple	Scores	Dance	Music	Result
James & Emma	36 (9, 9, 9, 9)	Jive	"I'm So Excited" — The Pointer Sisters	Safe
James & Emma	36 (9, 8, 10, 9)	Jazz	"Bye Bye Bye" — NSYNC	Safe
Sean & Jenna	26 (7, 6, 7, 6)	Argentine tango	"Bills, Bills, Bills" — Destiny's Child	Eliminated
Sean & Jenna	24 (6, 6, 6, 6)	Foxtrot	"Story of My Life" — One Direction	Eliminated
Hannah & Alan	32 (8, 8, 8, 8)	Salsa	"No Scrubs" — TLC	Safe
Hannah & Alan	39 (10, 9, 10, 10)	Tango	"Boy with Luv" — BTS	Safe
Ally & Sasha	40 (10, 10, 10, 10)	Samba	"Wannabe" — Spice Girls	Safe
Ally & Sasha	40 (10, 10, 10, 10)	Jazz	"Step by Step" — New Kids on the Block	Safe
Lauren & Gleb	34 (9, 9, 8, 8)	Quickstep	"You Can't Hurry Love" — The Supremes	Bottom two
Lauren & Gleb	36 (9, 9, 9, 9)	Rumba	"I Want It That Way" — Backstreet Boys	Bottom two
Kel & Witney	34 (8, 8, 9, 9)	Paso doble	"Free Your Mind" — En Vogue	Safe
Kel & Witney	40 (10, 10, 10, 10)	Viennese waltz	"I'll Make Love to You" — Boyz II Men	Safe

Judges' votes to save

- Carrie Ann: Lauren & Gleb
- Bruno: Lauren & Gleb
- Len: Did not vote

=== Week 10: Semifinals ===
During the first round, the couples performed a redemption dance to a new song that was coached by one of the three judges. In the second round, they performed one unlearned dance. Couples are listed in the order they performed.

Couple	Scores	Dance	Music	Result
Lauren & Gleb	27 (9, 9, 9)	Paso doble	"Stronger (What Doesn't Kill You)" — Kelly Clarkson	Safe
Lauren & Gleb	27 (9, 9, 9)	Viennese waltz	"Humble and Kind" — Tim McGraw	Safe
Kel & Witney	27 (9, 9, 9)	Tango	"Get Ready" — The Temptations	Safe
Kel & Witney	30 (10, 10, 10)	Contemporary	"I Will Always Love You" — Whitney Houston	Safe
Ally & Sasha	29 (10, 9, 10)	Viennese waltz	"Perfect" — Ed Sheeran	Bottom two
Ally & Sasha	30 (10, 10, 10)	Charleston	"Sing, Sing, Sing (With a Swing)" — Benny Goodman	Bottom two
Hannah & Alan	27 (9, 9, 9)	Rumba	"Dancing with a Stranger" — Sam Smith & Normani	Safe
Hannah & Alan	27 (9, 9, 9)	Contemporary	"Lose You to Love Me" — Selena Gomez	Safe
James & Emma	24 (8, 8, 8)	Cha-cha-cha	"Canned Heat" — Jamiroquai	Eliminated
James & Emma	27 (9, 9, 9)	Foxtrot	"Take Me to Church" — Hozier	Eliminated

Judges' votes to save

- Carrie Ann: Ally & Sasha
- Bruno: Ally & Sasha
- Len: Did not vote, but would have voted to save Ally & Sasha

=== Week 11: Finale ===
The couples performed their favorite dance of the season and their freestyle routine. Couples are listed in the order they performed.

Couple	Scores	Dance	Music	Result
Ally & Sasha	30 (10, 10, 10)	Jive	"Proud Mary" — Tina Turner	Third place
Ally & Sasha	30 (10, 10, 10)	Freestyle	"Conga" — Gloria Estefan & Miami Sound Machine	Third place
Lauren & Gleb	27 (9, 9, 9)	Foxtrot	"Jolene" — Dolly Parton	Fourth place
Lauren & Gleb	30 (10, 10, 10)	Freestyle	"Country Girl (Shake It for Me)" — Luke Bryan	Fourth place
Kel & Witney	30 (10, 10, 10)	Jazz	"We're All in This Together" — from High School Musical	Runners-up
Kel & Witney	29 (10, 9, 10)	Freestyle	"Jump" — Kris Kross	Runners-up
Hannah & Alan	28 (10, 9, 9)	Viennese waltz	"Lover" — Taylor Swift	Winners
Hannah & Alan	30 (10, 10, 10)	Freestyle	"Girl on Fire" — Alicia Keys "Hollaback Girl" — Gwen Stefani	Winners

== Dance chart ==
The couples performed the following each week:

- Week 1: One unlearned dance
- Week 2: One unlearned dance
- Week 3: One unlearned dance
- Week 4: One unlearned dance
- Week 5: One unlearned dance
- Week 6: One unlearned dance
- Week 7: One unlearned dance & team dance
- Week 8: One unlearned dance & dance-off
- Week 9: Two unlearned dances
- Week 10 (Semifinals): Redemption dance & one unlearned dance
- Week 11 (Finale): Favorite dance & freestyle

Dancing with the Stars (season 28) - Dance chart
Couple	Week															
Couple	1	2	3	4	5	6	7		8		9		10		11	
Hannah & Alan	Cha-cha-cha	Viennese waltz	Rumba	Paso doble	Foxtrot	Samba	Jazz	Team Freestyle	Quickstep	Salsa	Salsa	Tango	Rumba	Contemp.	Viennese waltz	Freestyle
Kel & Witney	Tango	Samba	Rumba	Cha-cha-cha	Jazz	Quickstep	Jive	Team Freestyle	Salsa	Jive	Paso doble	Viennese waltz	Tango	Contemp.	Jazz	Freestyle
Ally & Sasha	Cha-cha-cha	Viennese waltz	Rumba	Jive	Contemp.	Quickstep	Tango	Team Freestyle	Paso doble	Jive	Samba	Jazz	Viennese waltz	Charleston	Jive	Freestyle
Lauren & Gleb	Cha-cha-cha	Paso doble	Tango	Foxtrot	Samba	Contemp.	Argentine tango	Team Freestyle	Jive	Salsa	Quickstep	Rumba	Paso doble	Viennese waltz	Foxtrot	Freestyle
James & Emma	Tango	Cha-cha-cha	Rumba	Quickstep	Paso doble	Samba	Viennese waltz	Team Freestyle	Contemp.	Immunity	Jive	Jazz	Cha-cha-cha	Foxtrot		
Sean & Lindsay	Salsa	Tango	Cha-cha-cha	Paso doble	Quickstep	Viennese waltz	Jive	Team Freestyle	Jazz	Cha-cha-cha	Argentine tango	Foxtrot				
Kate & Pasha	Cha-cha-cha	Foxtrot	Quickstep	Argentine tango	Jazz	Viennese waltz	Rumba	Team Freestyle	Jive	Cha-cha-cha						
Karamo & Jenna	Salsa	Quickstep	Jive	Tango	Samba	Contemp.	Paso doble	Team Freestyle								
Sailor & Val	Foxtrot	Rumba	Tango	Cha-cha-cha	Viennese waltz	Jive										
Lamar & Peta	Foxtrot	Salsa	Cha-cha-cha	Viennese waltz												
Ray & Cheryl	Salsa	Foxtrot														
Mary & Brandon	Foxtrot	Cha-cha-cha														
