= Chmerkovskiy =

Chmerkovskiy is a surname. Notable people with the surname include:

- Maksim Chmerkovskiy (born 1980), Ukrainian-American dancer, choreographer, and teacher
- Valentin Chmerkovskiy (born 1986), Ukrainian-American dancer
