= 2007 Bonnaroo Music Festival =

The event list of the 2007 Bonnaroo Music Festival in Tennessee included:

== June 15th ==
(artists listed from earliest to latest set times)

- What Stage:
  - Kings of Leon
  - The Roots
  - John Butler Trio
  - Tool (band)
  - Ziggy Marley
  - Ben Harper & the Innocent Criminals
  - The Police
- Which Stage:
  - The Flaming Lips
  - RX Bandits
  - Brazilian Girls
  - Michael Franti and Spearhead
  - Manu Chao Radio Bemba Sound System
  - The String Cheese Incident
  - Clutch
  - Regina Spektor
  - Old Crow Medicine Show
  - Damien Rice
  - Franz Ferdinand
  - The White Stripes
- This Tent:
  - Ween
  - James Blood Ulmer
  - Tortoise
  - Hot Chip
  - Lily Allen
  - Aesop Rock
  - El-P
  - DJ Shadow
  - Unseen Vision
- That Tent:
  - Galactic
  - Cold War Kids
  - Paolo Nutini
  - The Nightwatchman
  - The Black Keys
  - STS9
  - Rodrigo y Gabriela
  - Spoon
- The Other Tent:
  - Keller Williams
  - Xavier Rudd
  - Hot Tuna
  - Railroad Earth
  - Uncle Earl
  - The Richard Thompson Band
  - Gillian Welch, David Rawlings, and John Paul Jones
  - Dierks Bentley
  - Girl Talk
  - Sasha and John Digweed
  - SuperJam feat. Ben Harper John Paul Jones (musician) and Questlove
- Somethin' Else:
  - Doug Wamble Quartet
  - Robert Glasper Trio
  - Downbeat Workshop
  - Robert Glasper Trio
  - Ravi Coltrane Quartet (2 Sets)
  - Mago featuring Billy Martin & John Medeski
- Sonic Stage:
  - EOTO
  - The Little Ones
  - Apollo Sunshine
  - Uncle Earl
  - Annuals
  - The Whigs
  - Brazilian Girls
  - Michael Franti
  - Tea Leaf Green
- The Bonnaroo Comedy Theatre:
  - Lewis Black & Friends (2 Sets)
  - David Cross (2 Sets)
  - Aziz Ansari
  - Finesse Mitchell
  - Lynne Koplitz
  - Dave Attell
  - Dov Davidoff
  - Nick Kroll
  - Demetri Martin
  - Flight of the Conchords
- Blue Room Café:
  - Dave Barnes
  - Tenderhooks
  - Bang Bang Bang (band)
  - Bonnaroompah Band
  - Ben Jelen
- Troo Music Lounge:
  - Tim Fite
  - Sam Champion
  - Alexa Ray Joel
  - Pieta Brown
  - Jennifer Niceley
  - jescoe
  - Angel and the Love Mongers
  - Haale
  - benzos
- Cinema Tent:
  - Current...TV
  - Down by Law
  - Go Further
  - Sneak Peek...HBO Presents Flight of the Conchords
  - Electric Apricot: Quest for Festeroo
  - Little Miss Sunshine
  - Current...TV
  - Borat: Cultural Learnings of America for Make Benefit Glorious Nation of Kazakhstan
  - Commando
  - Ghost Dog: The Way of the Samurai
  - 4 AM FELLINI FREAKOUT: La Dolce Vita
