= Haale =

American singer

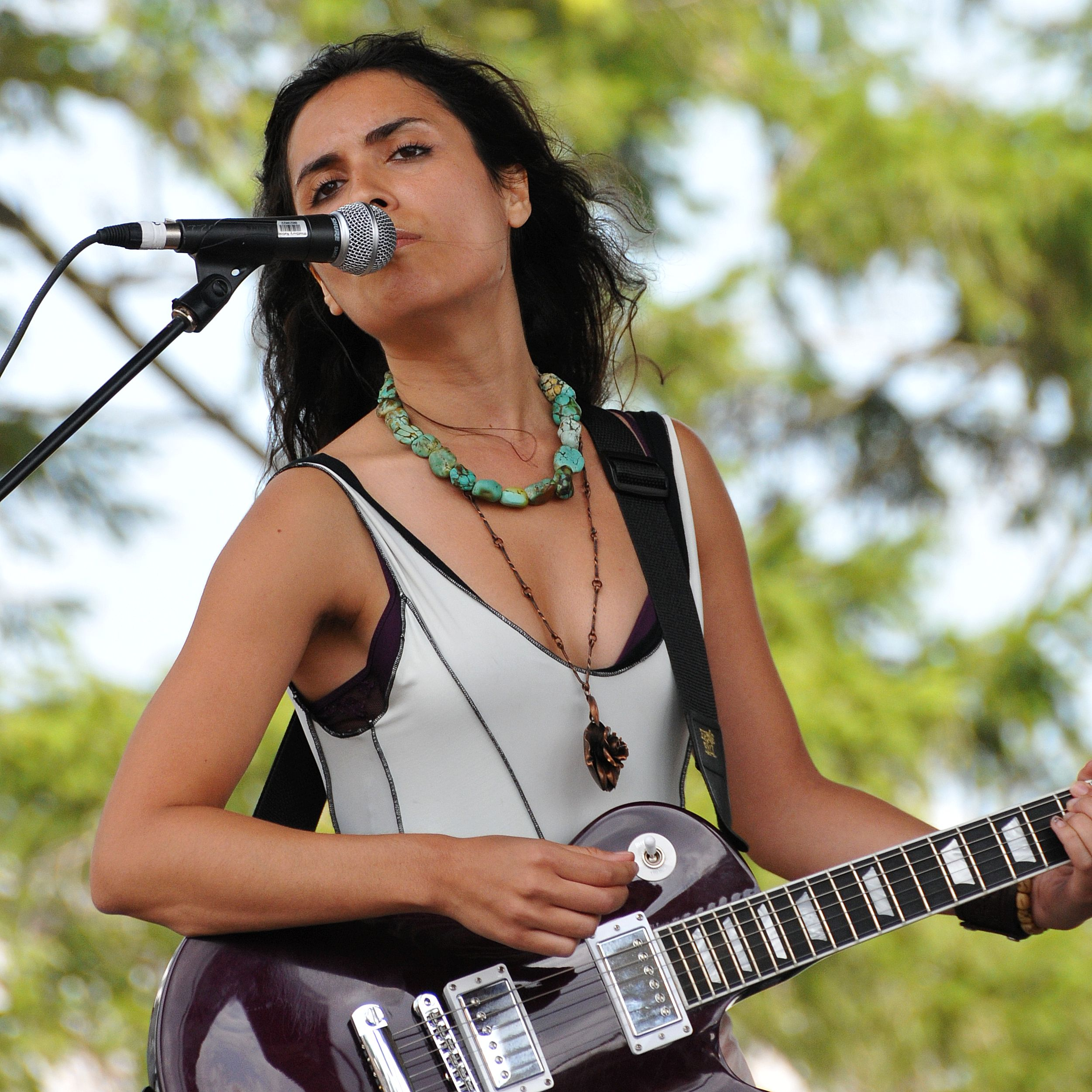
- Haale, July 2007

Background information
- Born: Haale Gafori; Bronx, New York
- Genres: World
- Occupations: Singer, Poet
- Instrument: Guitar

Haale Gafori is a singer, composer, and poet living in New York City. She was born in the Bronx, to Persian parents.

Haale released two five-song EP recordings, Morning and Paratrooper, on January 3, 2007, on the Darya Records imprint, produced by Dougie Bowne. She released the full-length album, "No Ceiling," on March 18, 2008, produced by percussionist Matt Kilmer. On these albums, Haale sings in both English and Persian, her own poetry as well the poetry of poets such as Rumi, Attar, and Forugh Farokhzad. The Boston Globe called "No Ceiling" one of 2008's "most memorable releases." Haale and bandmates Matt Kilmer, John Shannon, and Brent Arnold toured across the United States, Canada and Europe in 2007 and 2008, performing at the Bonnaroo Festival, the David Byrne-curated series at Carnegie Hall, the Mimi Festival in Marseilles France, Memorial Hall at University of Chapel Hill, North Carolina, the NuMoon festival in Rotterdam, and SXSW in Austin.

Haale and Matt Kilmer later launched a new project called The Mast, releasing two albums and an EP.

== Education ==
Haale graduated from Tenafly High School in New Jersey where she appeared in several musical and dramatic productions. Haale attended Stanford University in California, earning a BS in Biology. She completed a semester at Oxford University, during which she studied race relations in the UK.

Haale also attended the Jack Kerouac School for Disembodied Poetics in Boulder, Colorado, where Anne Waldman taught. She earned her MFA in poetry at the City College of New York, where she worked closely with poet Marilyn Hacker.

In 2014 Haale Gafori played a poet in a film based around the Palestine-Israeli conflict.

== Discography ==
Albums

- No Ceiling (Channel A Music—March 18, 2008)

EPs

- Paratrooper (Darya—January 3, 2007)
- Morning (Darya—January 3, 2007)

Compilation appearances

- One Giant Leap (2008)
- Caravan of Light (2007)
- Sandinista! – The Clash Tribute album
