= Julib.com =

E-mail newsletter founded by Juli Benlevi

JULIB.com was founded in New York City in 2002 as an e-mail newsletter by Juli Benlevi from her West Village apartment. It began with less than 400 users and by 2008, JULIB.com had grown to 700,000 subscriptions worldwide. Prior to ceasing operations, it published a Travel edition and 12 unique U.S. editions in New York, Los Angeles, Chicago, San Francisco, Miami, Dallas, Houston, Washington, D.C., Boston, Orange County, Atlanta, and the Hamptons.

== History ==
It was sold to the print publishing network Modern Luxury Media in July 2008 for an undisclosed sum who purchased the company to help promote its print magazines. Modern Luxury Media sold to Atlanta-based Dickey Publishing in October 2010. Benlevi reacquired JULIB.com and relaunched the business in January 2011.
