= Christie Brinkley =

American model, actress (born 1954)

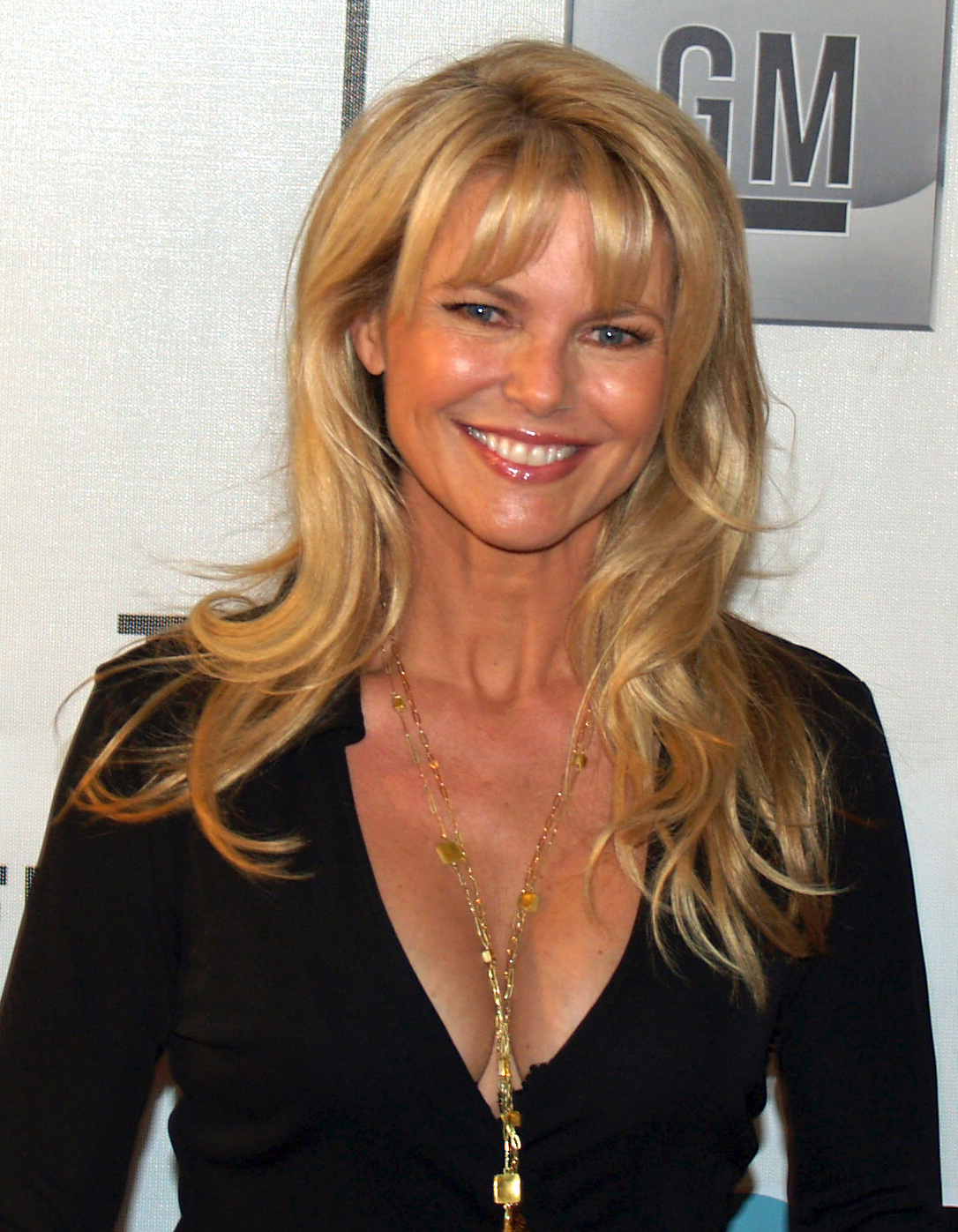
- Brinkley at the 2007 Tribeca Film Festival
- Born: Christie Lee Hudson; February 2, 1954 (age 72); Monroe, Michigan, U.S.
- Occupations: Model; actress; entrepreneur
- Years active: 1973–present
- Height: 5 ft 9 1/2 in (177 cm)
- Spouses: Jean-François Allaux (m. 1975; div. 1981); Billy Joel (m. 1985; div. 1994); Richard Taubman (m. 1994; div. 1995); Peter Cook (m. 1996; div. 2008)
- Children: 3, including Alexa Ray Joel and Sailor Brinkley Cook

Christie Lee Brinkley (née Hudson; born February 2, 1954) is an American model. Brinkley appeared on an unprecedented three consecutive covers of Sports Illustrated Swimsuit Issues in 1979, 1980, and 1981. She spent 25 years as the face of CoverGirl; has appeared on over 500 magazine covers; and has signed contracts with major brands, both fashion and non-fashion.

Brinkley went on to work as an actress, illustrator, television personality, author, photographer, writer, designer, and activist for human and animal rights and the environment. Brinkley has been married four times, including to musician Billy Joel between 1985 and 1994, having appeared in several of his music videos. Her fourth marriage, to architect Peter Cook, ended in a much-publicized 2008 divorce. Magazines such as Allure and Men's Health have named Brinkley one of the most attractive women of all time.

== Early life ==
Brinkley was born Christie Lee Hudson in Monroe, Michigan, on February 2, 1954, the daughter of Marjorie (née Bowling) and Herbert Hudson.

Her family moved to Canoga Park, Los Angeles, California, where her mother Marjorie later met and married television writer Donald Brinkley in Bel Air, Los Angeles. Donald adopted Christie and her brother Greg Brinkley. During this time, the family lived in Malibu and then the Brentwood neighborhoods of Los Angeles. Brinkley was educated at Paul Revere Junior High School and attended Le Lycée Français de Los Angeles from 9th to 12th grade.

After graduating in 1972, she moved to Paris to study art.

== Career ==
=== Career beginnings ===
Brinkley was discovered in 1973 by American photographer Errol Sawyer in a post office in Paris. He took her first modeling pictures and introduced her to John Casablancas of Elite Model Management agency in Paris. Brinkley stated later: "I was basically a surfer girl from California. I never looked like a model." After being introduced to Elite, where Brinkley met the fashion photographers Patrick Demarchelier and Mike Reinhardt who called Eileen Ford and told her about Brinkley, she returned to California, and by the end of a lunch meeting with Nina Blanchard (Eileen Ford affiliate in Los Angeles) she had been booked for three national ad campaigns.

=== Breakthrough and continued success ===
Multiple appearances on the cover of Glamour soon followed, along with a record 25-year contract with cosmetics brand CoverGirl, one of the longest modeling contracts in history. In 2005, CoverGirl again signed Brinkley, using her in ads in magazines and TV commercials for mature skin products. In 1989, Brinkley was, along with Cheryl Tiegs and Beverly Johnson, one of the three models featured as dolls produced by Matchbox Toys called The Real Model Collection.

External images
- Brinkley's Sports Illustrated Swimsuit Issue cover from February 5, 1979
- Brinkley's Sports Illustrated Swimsuit Issue cover from February 4, 1980
- Brinkley's Sports Illustrated Swimsuit Issue cover from February 9, 1981
- Brinkley's Life magazine cover from February 1982

Brinkley appeared on three consecutive Sports Illustrated Swimsuit Issue covers (1979, 1980, and 1981) – the first time that had happened – and appeared in the publication's annual swimsuit issues and television specials for years to follow. Brinkley was featured exclusively in the first Sports Illustrated Calendar and also released two of her own calendars. In 2005, Brinkley was featured in the special Sports Illustrated 40th Anniversary Issue's Hall of Fame, celebrating the most revered figures in the magazine's history and again in 2014, in the 50th Anniversary The Legends.

As an editorial model, Brinkley has appeared on over 500 magazine covers, including US, Vogue, Newsweek, Rolling Stone, Esquire, Harper's Bazaar, Cosmopolitan, Glamour and the best-selling issue of Life. She has held major contracts with Chanel No. 19, Prell, MasterCard, Breck, Diet Coke, Anheuser-Busch, Got Milk?, Healthy Choice, Max Factor, Nissan, Noxzema, Revlon, Clairol, Borghese Cosmetics, Danskin, Nu Skin, Yardley of London, Halston, Vogue Patterns, Gottex and Black Velvet, among others. Brinkley has been photographed in six continents in more than 30 countries.

=== Acting and television appearances ===
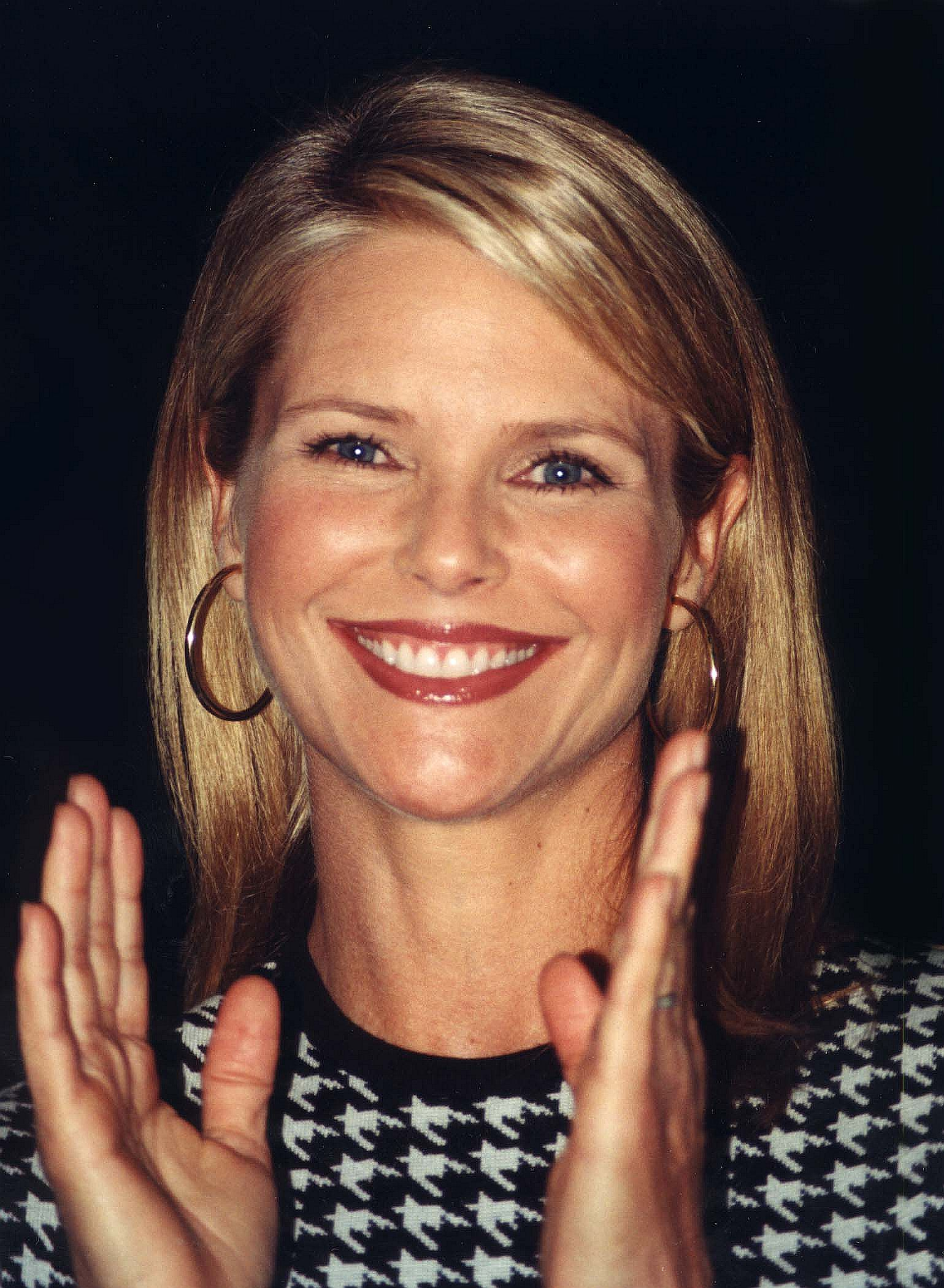
Brinkley in 2000

Brinkley played her first acting role in the 1983 film National Lampoon's Vacation as "The girl in the red Ferrari" opposite Chevy Chase. She reprised that role in the 1997 sequel Vegas Vacation; later spoofed it in a 2008 DirecTV commercial, using footage from Vacation; again in a 2015 Infiniti commercial as the wife in the Infiniti (the blonde in the convertible for this spoof is model Scarlett Burke); and again in the ABC series The Goldbergs in 2019. In 2011, she appeared as herself in the documentary King of the Hamptons, which was produced by filmmaker Dennis Michael Lynch. The film premiered at the 2010 Hamptons International Film Festival.

Brinkley's appearance on NBC's Mad About You was the broadcaster's highest-rated half-hour episode since the finale of The Cosby Show. She hosted Celebrity Weddings InStyle, the highest-rated special in Lifetime's history. Brinkley appeared on the Today Show in 1983 in a four-part segment featuring beauty tips and, in 1992, began her own television series Living in the 90s — With Christie Brinkley, a daily half-hour show on CNN.

Brinkley made further television appearances, including Sports Illustrated Swimsuit Issue television specials and music videos for beau Billy Joel ("Uptown Girl", "Keeping the Faith", "All About Soul", "River of Dreams", "A Matter of Trust" and "Leningrad") and Mick Jones's "Just Wanna Hold". She had a recurring role as Gayle Gergich, the wife of Jerry Gergich, on NBC's Parks and Recreation. In December 2012, Brinkley co-hosted Anderson Live and also danced with Dancing With the Stars alumnus Gilles Marini during the show.

On April 8, 2011, in New York, Brinkley made her stage debut as Roxie Hart in the long-running musical Chicago. In August, she completed a one-month engagement in the London's production at Cambridge Theatre and reprised the role on Broadway and continued with 182 total performances with the National Touring Company of Chicago in cities including Los Angeles, San Diego, Boston and Hartford. In April 2019, Brinkley reprised the Roxie Hart role in Chicago at the Venetian Theatre at The Venetian Las Vegas.

On August 5, 2019, it was reported by Deadline that Brinkley would have a guest role on the season 7 premiere of the ABC television series The Goldbergs playing a character named Aleah Welsh. In 2019, Brinkley was announced as one of the celebrities to compete on the 28th season of Dancing with the Stars. However, sometime before the premiere, she suffered injuries to her wrist and arm that required emergency surgery. As a result, her daughter Sailor, stepped in her place for the season. In 2022, Brinkley competed in season seven of The Masked Singer as "Lemur" of Team Cuddly.

=== Businesses ===
Since 1997, Brinkley has appeared with Chuck Norris in a long-running series of cable TV infomercials promoting Total Gym home fitness equipment. In 2008, Brinkley and Carlon Colker promoted National Family Fitness Day with Xbox 360 at the Boys & Girls Clubs of America. Brinkley promotes Christie Brinkley Authentic Skin Care, a line of beauty products, Hair2Wear, a line of hair extensions, Bellissima Prosecco, an organic sparkling wine label and Christie Brinkley Eyewear, an eyeglasses eyewear. Her financial holdings in 2019 were worth an estimated US$80 million, primarily as the owner of real estate mainly in the Hamptons.

=== Other work ===
In 1983, Brinkley wrote and illustrated a book on health and beauty, Christie Brinkley's Outdoor Beauty and Fitness Book, which topped The New York Times Best Seller list. Brinkley illustrated the cover art for Billy Joel's 1993 triple platinum album River of Dreams. For this, Rolling Stone awarded her the honor of "Best album cover of the year". Brinkley has designed clothing patterns for Simplicity Pattern and in March 1994 helped design, for brand Nouveau Eyewear, her line of prescription glasses and sunglasses called Christie Brinkley Perspectives with worldwide sales. In Spring 1998 she released her own signature fragrance, Believe. Her jewelry collection is manufactured by Swank.

== Public image ==
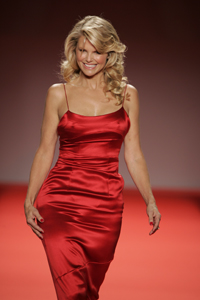
Modeling a dress by Calvin Klein at the 2005 Red Dress Collection fashion show in New York's Bryant Park

In 1991, Brinkley was considered to have an ideal, all-American look with her blonde hair, blue eyes, slim figure, and soft features, when Allure first conducted a survey taking the pulse of the average American (men and women) searching for their beauty perceptions and preferences.

In 1998, Playboy readers voted Brinkley one of the 100 Sexiest Women of the 20th century. Brinkley is ranked third in the AskMen.com Top 10 Supermodels Of All Time. In 2011, Men's Health named her one of the "100 Hottest Women of All-Time", ranking her at No. 16. Pop-topia.com named her No. 1 on their list of "10 Hottest Hollywood Women In Their 50s" in 2013.

== Personal life ==
In November 1975, Brinkley married French artist Jean-François Allaux. They divorced in 1981. In 1982, Brinkley had a romantic relationship with Olivier Chandon de Brailles, heir to the Moët-Chandon Champagne fortune. The two met at Studio 54 in New York City at a party promoting a calendar in which Brinkley appeared. Chandon died a year later in a crash at a private pre-season practice session car race.

Her second marriage was in 1985 to musician Billy Joel. The two had met in 1983 on the Island of St Barts, in the Caribbean, and were married on March 23, 1985, on a yacht on the Hudson River; it was also Joel's second marriage. Guests included singer Paul Simon and members of the band Stray Cats. The marriage ended in August 1994. They had one child, Alexa Ray Joel, born December 29, 1985. Brinkley and Billy Joel remain close friends.

In 1994, Brinkley was introduced to real estate developer Richard Taubman by a mutual friend. He proposed in May 1994 while she and Billy Joel were still married. She married Taubman on December 22, 1994, in Telluride, Colorado, near the area where they were both in a helicopter crash on April 1, 1994. Brinkley was 40 and Taubman was 46. She announced at their wedding that they were expecting a baby boy. The marriage ended in 1995 with one son, Jack Paris Brinkley, born June 2, 1995. As a result of the helicopter crash, she suffered years of hip pain, culminating in a full hip replacement in 2021.

Brinkley's fourth marriage was in 1996, to architect Peter Halsey Cook. Cook and Brinkley met in 1979 when he was modeling. They were later reintroduced by a mutual friend and announced their engagement in August 1996. They married on September 21, 1996. They had one child, daughter Sailor Lee Brinkley Cook, born July 2, 1998, with the help of IVF as Brinkley was 44. Brinkley's representative announced in July 2006 that Brinkley and Peter Cook planned to separate. The couple reached a settlement in July 2008; accounts differ as to whether divorce was final on September 12, 2008, or October 3, 2008.

In September 2015, Brinkley was in a relationship with John Mellencamp. In August 2016, the couple announced their separation.

=== Interests ===
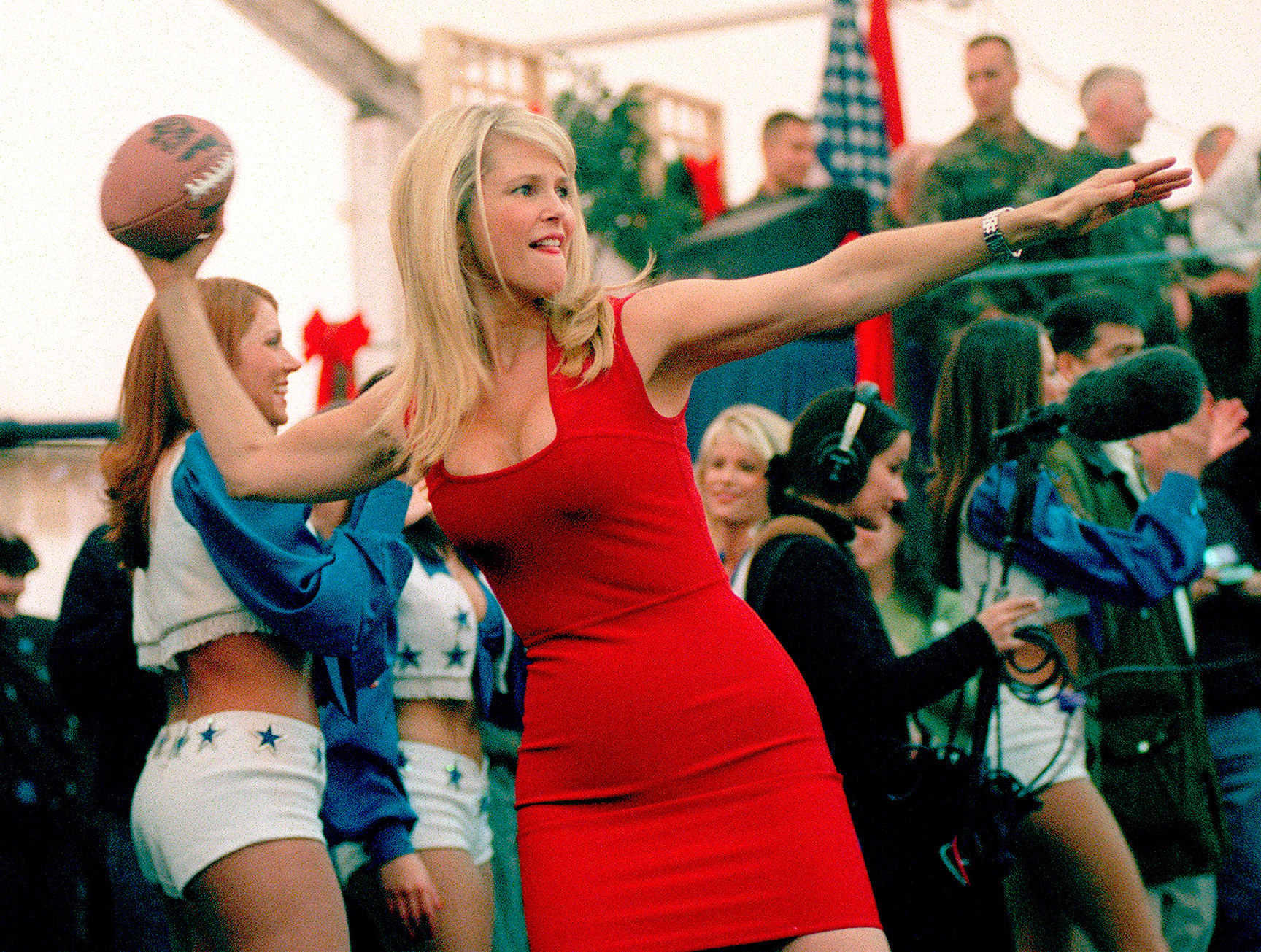
Brinkley winds up to throw an autographed football into the audience during a USO show in the Eagle Sports Complex at Tuzla Air Base, Bosnia and Herzegovina (December 22, 1999)

Brinkley lives on Long Island in Sag Harbor, New York; she previously lived in Bridgehampton and Amagansett, Long Island. She and her children are fans of the New York Islanders ice hockey team. Brinkley began doing promotions for the team after being noticed at games. In 2007, she showed her support by writing a blog for NHL.com and filming a commercial. Brinkley helped found a club for cutting, an equestrian sport in which a rider has two and a half minutes to cut as many cattle from a herd as he or she can.

Since 1998, Brinkley has given nearly $1,000,000 to organizations and candidates of the Democratic Party of the United States, including Hillary Clinton, Barack Obama, Democratic National Committee, Democratic Senatorial Campaign Committee, Democratic Congressional Campaign Committee, America Coming Together and Moveon.org. In the New York delegation, Brinkley served as a delegate on the 2000 Democratic National Convention in Los Angeles. She has also been involved in anti-nuclear activities and campaigned against the restarting of the High Flux Beam Reactor (HFBR) located at the Brookhaven National Laboratory.

Brinkley supports animal rights, most notably through the organization PETA, having previously spoken out against the Ringling Bros. and Barnum & Bailey Circus. She became a vegetarian when she was 13 years old and then got her entire family to become vegetarians.

Brinkley published her memoir Uptown Girl in April 2025.

== Awards and achievements ==
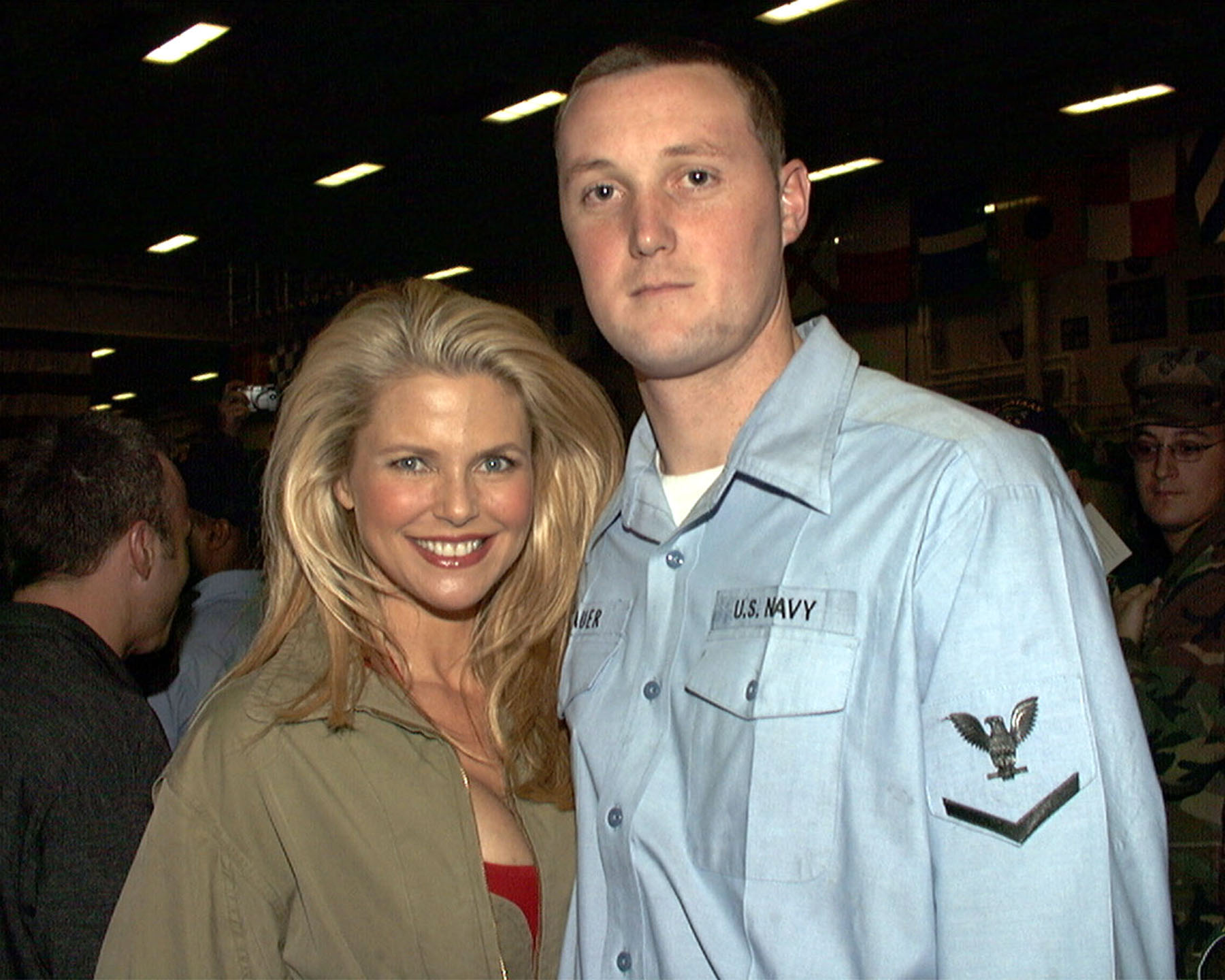
December 1999, during a Christmas visit to the USO

- Top Picks, in 1993 by Rolling Stone for the artistic work Brinkley did on the cover of Billy Joel's album River of Dreams.
- 2001 Merit Award, given by USO-The United Service Organizations Inc. Brinkley traveled with the USO on goodwill missions to Sarajevo, Bosnia, Kosovo, Macedonia and Italy entertaining the peacekeeping forces and visiting aircraft carriers and refugee camps. After participating in Secretary of Defense William Cohen's Christmas tour to Kosovo, she was given the award in Washington DC for her efforts on behalf of American troops.
- Spirit of Achievement Award, at 2003 by "The Women's Division" of Albert Einstein College of Medicine at Yeshiva University presented Brinkley for her charity work.
- Christie Brinkley Scholarship, at February 2007 by The Ross School in East Hampton, Long Island, New York. This scholarship allows students interested in art or environment sciences get four free years at Ross High School.
- Heart Award, special honor from the American Heart Association in the "12th Annual Heart of the Hamptons Gala" for her commitment to helping children live healthier lives. Brinkley said she was very honored to receive the award from the AHA being convinced that the research from the organization made it possible for her mother to be alive after suffering five strokes.
- Humanitarian Award, given by March of Dimes. This organization is dedicated to improving the health of babies by preventing birth defects, premature birth, and infant mortality through research, community services, education and advocacy.
- Merit Award, by the non-profit USA national organization Mothers Voices which mission is strengthens family communication about sex, sexual health and HIV/AIDS/STD prevention through education and awareness, mobilize parents and caregivers to become their child's frontline sexual health educator.
- Mother of the Year, given by The National Mothers Day committee at a ceremony held in New York City.
- Merit Award, given by Make-A-Wish Foundation in New York. They work granting the wishes of children with life-threatening medical conditions to enrich the human experience with hope, strength, and joy.
- America's Mothers and Shakers, named by Redbook Magazine for her involvement in "STAR — Standing for Truth About Radiation".
- HBA's Positively Beautiful Award, named by HBA Global Expo on behalf of her work with the international charity Smile Train.
- Mothers Who Make A Difference Award, given by Love Our Children USA on the 2011 Sixth Annual edition, recognizing and supporting four celebrity moms for balancing motherhood, work and causes.
- Broadway Beacon Award for her portrayal of Roxie Hart in the hit musical Chicago (June 4, 2012).
- Honor by the South Fork Natural History Museum and Nature Center for her many years of work to raise awareness about nuclear radiation and the safety of the oceans (June 16, 2012).
- 2013 Pet Hero Award, Humanitarian of the Year, by the Pet Philanthropy Circle for her strong advocacy for animals, environment and wildlife.
- 2018 FN Style Influencer of the Year along with daughters Alexa and Sailor.

== Filmography ==
Year	Title	Role	Notes
1983	National Lampoon's Vacation	The Girl in the Ferrari	
1989	The All New Mickey Mouse Club	Herself	Episode: "Guest Day"
1994	Mad About You	Herself	Episode: "Virtual Reality"
1997	Vegas Vacation	The Girl in the Ferrari	
2009	Ugly Betty	Penelope Graybridge	Episode: "The Bahamas Triangle"
2011	Jack and Jill	Herself	
2012–2015	Parks and Recreation	Gayle Gergich	4 episodes
2015	Donny!	Herself	Episode: "Foxy at Fifty!"
2017	Nightcap	Herself	2 episodes
2019	The Goldbergs	Aleah Welsh	Episode: "Vacation"
2022	The Masked Singer	Herself/Lemur	Season 7 contestant
2025	Dexter: Resurrection	Herself	Episode: "And Justice for All..."
