= BELLA (American magazine) =

American luxury lifestyle magazine

- CEO / Editor-In-Chief: Vanessa Coppes
- Categories: Lifestyle, fashion
- Frequency: Bi-monthly
- Publisher: Bella Media + Co.
- Founded: 2011; 14 years ago
- Country: United States
- Based in: New York
- Website: bellamag.co

BELLA is an American luxury lifestyle and fashion magazine. Distributed nationally, BELLA covers topics like fashion, beauty, health, philanthropy, arts and culture, cuisine, travel, celebrity and entertainment.

BELLA was founded in January 2011 by Daniel and Courtenay Hall who ran the company through the August 2019 issue. On August 1, 2019, Vanessa Coppes acquired BELLA, becoming its owner, CEO and editor-in-chief.
