= Sailor Brinkley Cook =

American model (born 1998)

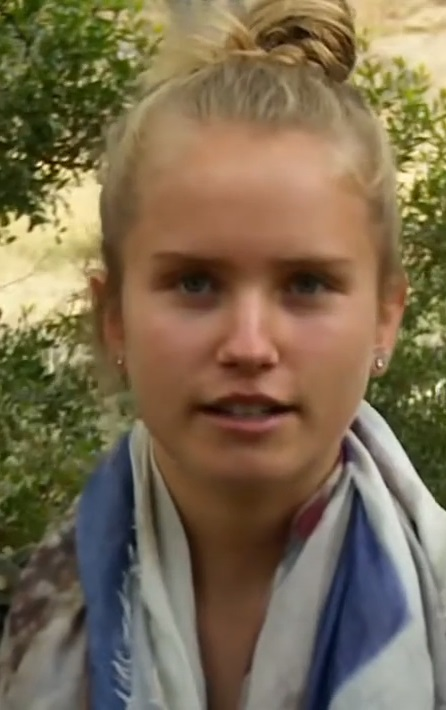
- Cook in 2013
- Born: July 2, 1998 (age 28); Bridgehampton, New York, US
- Occupation: Model
- Agent: IMG Models
- Mother: Christie Brinkley
- Relatives: Alexa Ray Joel (half-sister)

Sailor Lee Brinkley Cook (born July 2, 1998) is an American model and the daughter of supermodel Christie Brinkley. Billy Joel is her godfather.

== Family and early life ==
Cook's father is architect Peter Halsey Cook, who once modeled with her mother Christie Brinkley in 1979. They eventually reconnected and were married from 1996 until their 2008 divorce. Cook was conceived via in vitro fertilization and her mother was 44 at the time Cook was born.

Cook has two maternal half-siblings: Alexa Ray Joel (b. 1985) from Brinkley's marriage to Billy Joel, and Jack Paris Brinkley (b. 1995) from Brinkley's marriage to Richard Taubman. Her godfather is Billy Joel, whom she refers to as “Uncle Billy.”

Growing up, Cook wanted to become a comedian or a professional athlete. During elementary school, Cook participated in dance lessons but nerves got the better of her and she never performed in recitals. She started modeling at age 15 after accompanying her mother on shoots and being encouraged to try herself.

== Career ==
Cook received her big break courtesy of a Teen Vogue editorial feature. Sailor appeared alongside her mother, Christie Brinkley, and half-sister, Alexa Ray Joel, in the 2017 Sports Illustrated Swimsuit Issue. In 2018, she appeared in the 2018 Sports Illustrated Swimsuit Issue.

As part of her modelling career, Cook has been photographed for publications such as Vogue and Sports Illustrated. She walked the runway at New York Fashion Week in 2019, and has walked for brands such as Dolce and Gabbana.

In 2019, Cook performed on the American version of Dancing with the Stars, filling in for her mother who was injured at the time, overcoming her nervousness about dancing.

== Personal life ==
Cook has been vocal about body dysmorphia issues.
