= List of songs recorded by Fiona Apple =

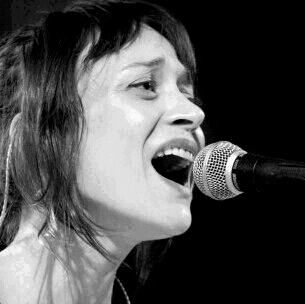
Fiona Apple performing in 2012

American singer-songwriter Fiona Apple has recorded songs for her five studio albums and collaborated with other artists for duets and featured songs on their respective albums. After signing a contract in 1995 with the Work Group, a division of Sony Music, eighteen-year-old Apple moved from New York to Los Angeles to record her debut album, Tidal (1996). She wrote all of its songs, and would continue to do so for her later albums. "Shadowboxer" was Tidal's lead single, later followed by "Slow Like Honey", "Sleep to Dream", "The First Taste", "Criminal" and "Never Is a Promise". In 1998, Apple also recorded two cover versions for the film soundtrack Pleasantville: "Across the Universe" (Lennon–McCartney) and "Please Send Me Someone to Love" (Percy Mayfield). Sony released Apple's second album, When the Pawn..., in 1999, which was less commercially successful than her debut. It included the singles "Fast as You Can", "Limp" and "Paper Bag".

After a six-year hiatus, Extraordinary Machine (2005) was released by Sony. Its singles included "Parting Gift", "O' Sailor", "Not About Love", and "Get Him Back". A year later, Apple recorded "Sally's Song", a song written by composer Danny Elfman, for the special edition soundtrack to The Nightmare Before Christmas. In 2012, Sony released "Every Single Night", the lead single of Apple's fourth album, The Idler Wheel..., which was released soon after. This single was followed by "Werewolf" and "Anything We Want". That year also saw Apple record "Dull Tool", her first original song for a film soundtrack, for the film This Is 40. After an eight-year hiatus, Fetch the Bolt Cutters (2020) was released by Sony. Its lead single, "Shameika", was released soon after. The album was met with widespread acclaim, with many critics deeming it an instant classic, a masterpiece, and Apple's best work to date.

In addition, Apple has recorded five songs for compilation albums, including "Frosty the Snowman" for the holiday album Christmas Calling (2003), "I Walk a Little Faster" and "Why Try to Change Me Now" for The Best Is Yet to Come: The Songs of Cy Coleman (2009), "So Sleepy" (featuring Jon Brion and the Punch Brothers) for Chickens in Love (2010), "Everyday" (with Brion) for Rave On Buddy Holly (2011), and "I'm in the Middle of a Riddle" (featuring Maude Maggart) for Sweetheart 2014 (2014). Collaborations appearing on other artists' albums include "Bridge over Troubled Water" and "Father and Son" for Johnny Cash's albums American IV: The Man Comes Around (2002) and Unearthed (2003), "Loveless" for Davíd Garza's Dream Delay (2008), and "You're the One I Love" for Sara Watkins' Sun Midnight Sun (2012). Other collaborations released as singles include "Come On and Get It (Up in 'Dem Guts)" with Zach Galifianakis (2006) and "I Want You" with Elvis Costello (2006). Apple also performed the jazz standard "Angel Eyes" for the film Largo, though no official soundtrack was released.

== List of songs ==
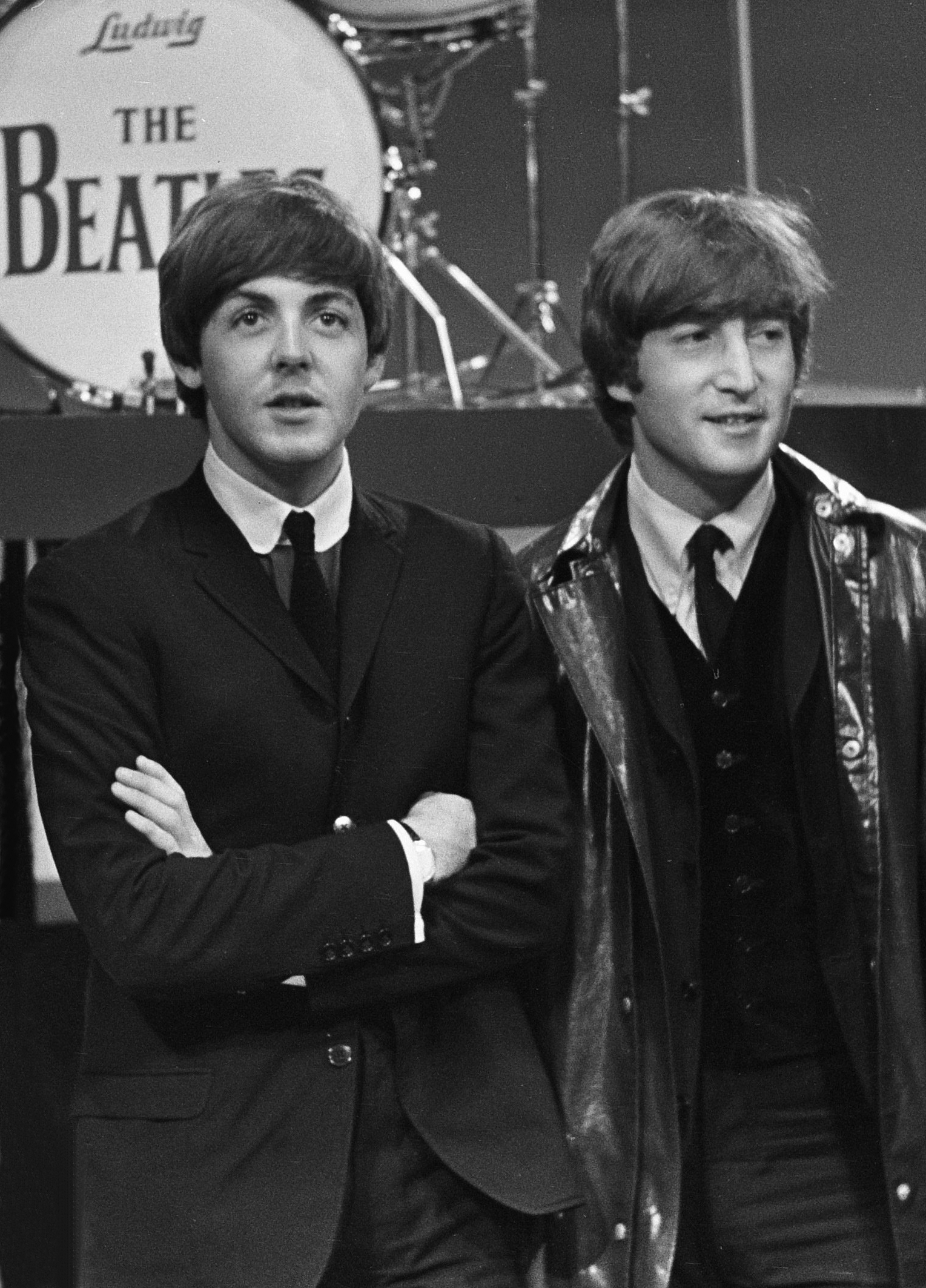
Apple's cover of "Across the Universe", credited to John Lennon and Paul McCartney (pictured in 1964), was recorded for the Pleasantville soundtrack, released in 1998.

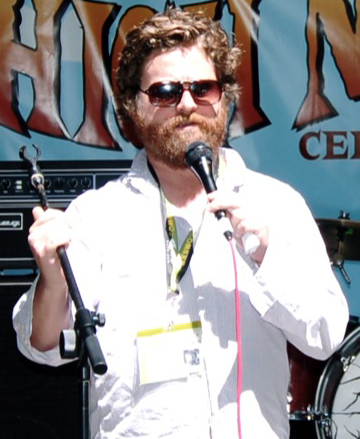
Apple provided vocals to Zach Galifianakis' (pictured in 2007) promotional single "Come On and Get It (Up in 'Dem Guts)" (2006).

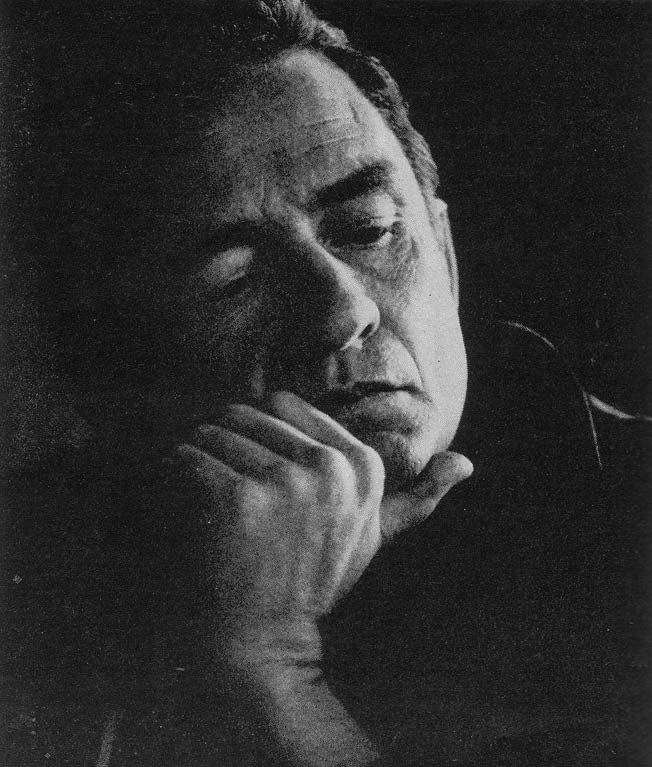
Apple recorded "Bridge over Troubled Water" with Johnny Cash (pictured in 1969) for his 2002 album American IV: The Man Comes Around; the duo also recorded "Father and Son" for Cash's 2003 album Unearthed.

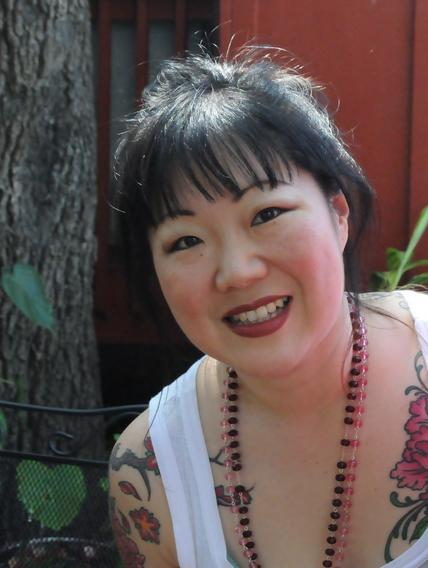
Apple and Ben Lee are featured guests on "Hey Big Dog" from Margaret Cho's (pictured in 2009) album Cho Dependent, released in 2010.

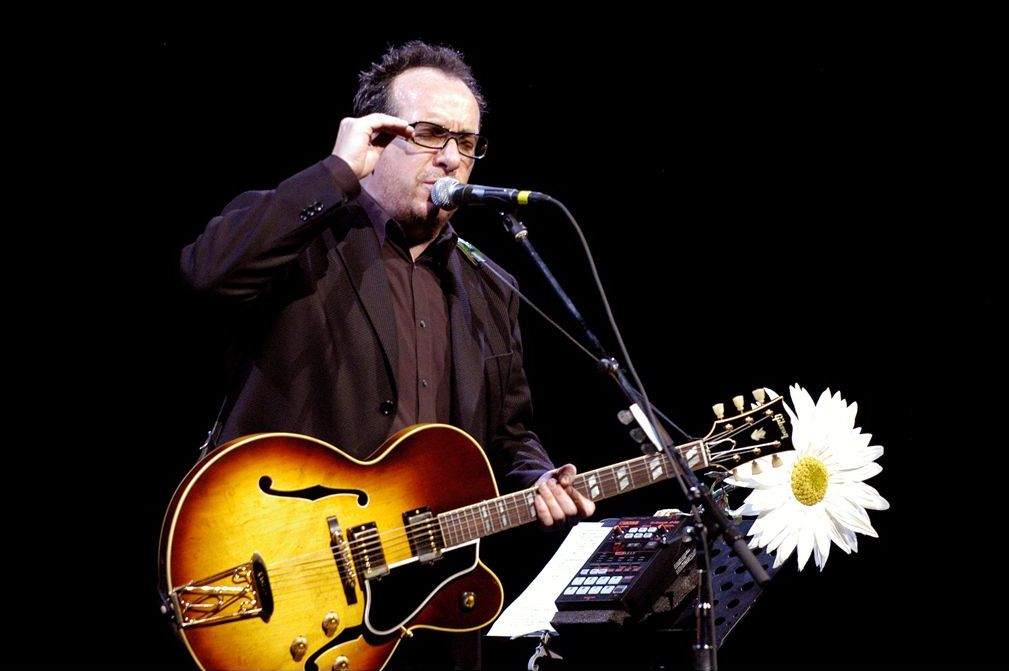
Apple recorded "I Want You" with Elvis Costello (pictured in 2006) for the VH1 Classic television program Decades Rock Live in 2006; the song was later released as a single.

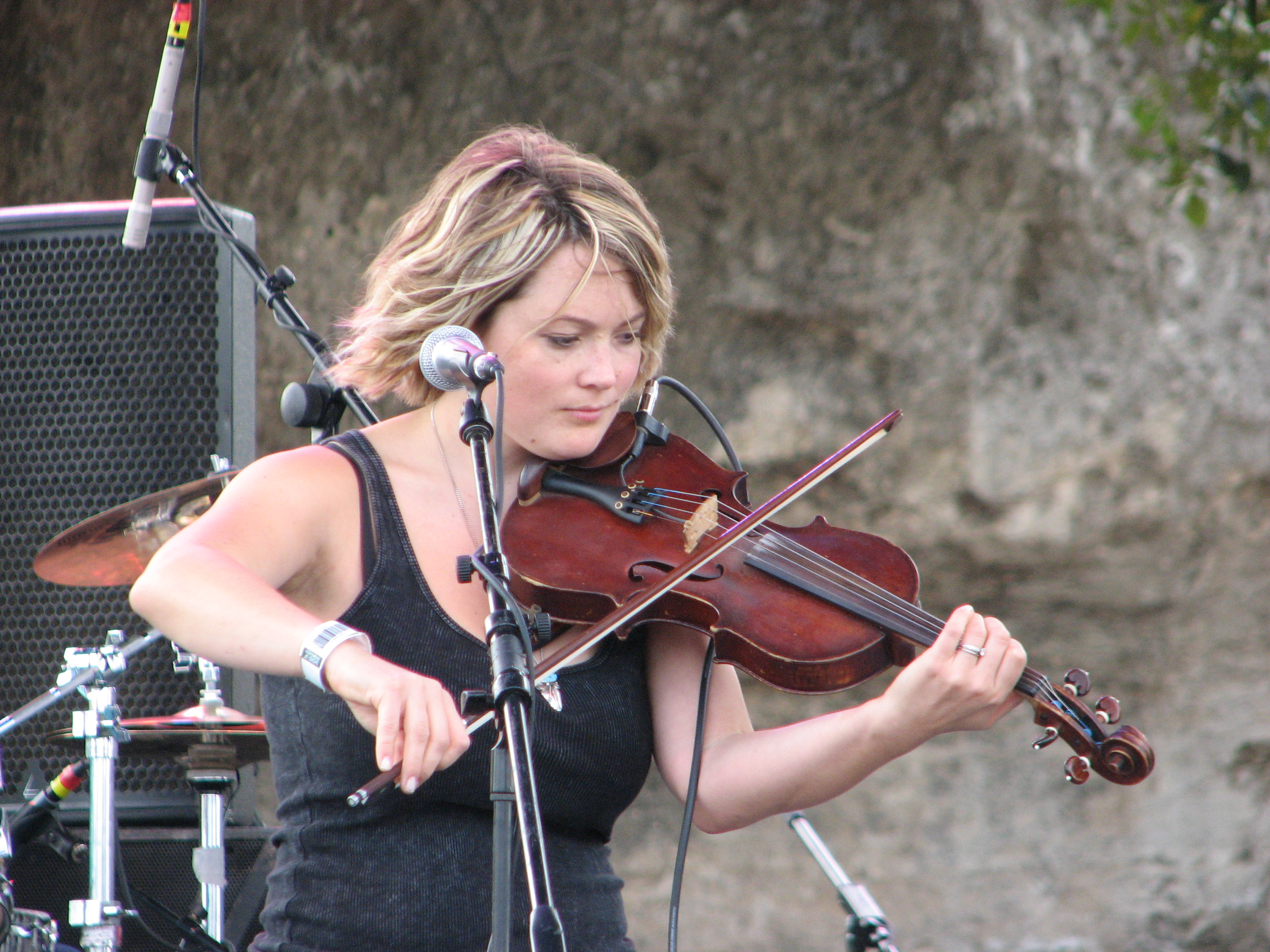
Apple provided vocals for "You're the One I Love" on Sara Watkins' (pictured in 2009) album Sun Midnight Sun (2012).

Key
†	Indicates single release

List of songs recorded by Fiona Apple
Song	Artist(s)	Writer(s)	Original release	Year	Ref.
"Across the Universe"	Fiona Apple	Lennon–McCartney	Pleasantville	1998	
"Angel Eyes"	Fiona Apple	Matt Dennis; Earl Brent	—N/a	2008	
"Anything We Want" †	Fiona Apple	Fiona Apple	The Idler Wheel...	2012	
"Better Version of Me"	Fiona Apple	Fiona Apple	Extraordinary Machine	2005	
"Bridge over Troubled Water"	Johnny Cash featuring Fiona Apple	Paul Simon	American IV: The Man Comes Around	2002	
"Carrion"	Fiona Apple	Fiona Apple	Tidal	1996	
"The Child Is Gone"	Fiona Apple	Fiona Apple	Tidal	1996	
"Come On and Get It (Up in 'Dem Guts)" †	Zach Galifianakis featuring Fiona Apple	Unknown	"Come On and Get It (Up in 'Dem Guts)" (Single)	2006	
"Container"	Fiona Apple	Fiona Apple	—N/a	2014	
"Cosmonauts"	Fiona Apple	Fiona Apple	Fetch the Bolt Cutters	2020	
"Criminal" †	Fiona Apple	Fiona Apple	Tidal	1996	
"Daredevil"	Fiona Apple	Fiona Apple	The Idler Wheel...	2012	
"Don't Worry 'Bout Me"	Jeff Goldblum and the Mildred Snitzer; Orchestra, featuring Fiona Apple	Rube Bloom; Ted Koehler	I Shouldn’t Be Telling You This	2019	
"Drumset"	Fiona Apple	Fiona Apple	Fetch the Bolt Cutters	2020	
"Dull Tool"	Fiona Apple	Fiona Apple	This Is 40	2012	
"Every Single Night" †	Fiona Apple	Fiona Apple	The Idler Wheel...	2012	
"Everyday"	Fiona Apple and Jon Brion	Buddy Holly; Norman Petty	Rave On Buddy Holly	2011	
"Extraordinary Machine"	Fiona Apple	Fiona Apple	Extraordinary Machine	2005	
"Fast as You Can" †	Fiona Apple	Fiona Apple	When the Pawn...	1999	
"Father and Son"	Johnny Cash featuring Fiona Apple	Cat Stevens	Unearthed	2003	
"Fetch the Bolt Cutters"	Fiona Apple	Fiona Apple	Fetch the Bolt Cutters	2020	
"The First Taste" †	Fiona Apple	Fiona Apple	Tidal	1996	
"For Her"	Fiona Apple	Fiona Apple	Fetch the Bolt Cutters	2020	
"Frosty the Snowman"	Fiona Apple	Steve Nelson; Walter E. Rollins	Christmas Calling	2003	
"Get Gone"	Fiona Apple	Fiona Apple	When the Pawn...	1999	
"Get Him Back" †	Fiona Apple	Fiona Apple	Extraordinary Machine	2005	
"Heavy Balloon"	Fiona Apple	Fiona Apple	Fetch the Bolt Cutters	2020	
"Hey Big Dog"	Margaret Cho featuring Fiona Apple and Ben Lee	Patty Griffin	Cho Dependent	2012	
"Hot Knife"	Fiona Apple	Fiona Apple	The Idler Wheel...	2012	
"I'm in the Middle of a Riddle"	Fiona Apple featuring Maude Maggart	Anton Karas	Sweetheart 2014	2014	
"I Can't Wait to Meet You"	Fiona Apple	Solangie Jimenez, Thomas Cabaniss	Hopes & Dreams: The Lullaby Project	2018	
"I Know"	Fiona Apple	Fiona Apple	When the Pawn...	1999	
"I Know"	King Princess featuring Fiona Apple	Fiona Apple	—N/a	2019	
"I Walk a Little Faster"	Fiona Apple	Cy Coleman; Carolyn Leigh	The Best Is Yet to Come: The Songs of Cy Coleman	2009	
"I Want You" †	Elvis Costello featuring Fiona Apple	Elvis Costello	"I Want You" (Single)	2006	
"I Want You to Love Me"	Fiona Apple	Fiona Apple	Fetch the Bolt Cutters	2020	
"It's Only a Paper Moon"	Maude Maggart with Fiona Apple	Harold Arlen; Yip Harburg; Billy Rose	With Sweet Despair	2005	
"Jonathan"	Fiona Apple	Fiona Apple	The Idler Wheel...	2012	
"Ladies"	Fiona Apple	Fiona Apple	Fetch the Bolt Cutters	2020	
"Largo"	Fiona Apple	Fiona Apple	The Idler Wheel... [Deluxe Version]	2012	
"Left Alone"	Fiona Apple	Fiona Apple	The Idler Wheel...	2012	
"Left Handed Kisses"	Andrew Bird featuring Fiona Apple	Andrew Bird	Are You Serious	2016	
"Limp" †	Fiona Apple	Fiona Apple	When the Pawn...	1999	
"Love Ridden"	Fiona Apple	Fiona Apple	When the Pawn...	1999	
"Loveless"	Davíd Garza featuring Fiona Apple	Unknown	Dream Delay	2008	
"A Mistake"	Fiona Apple	Fiona Apple	When the Pawn...	1999	
"Never Is a Promise" †	Fiona Apple	Fiona Apple	Tidal	1996	
"Newspaper"	Fiona Apple	Fiona Apple	Fetch the Bolt Cutters	2020	
"Not About Love" †	Fiona Apple	Fiona Apple	Extraordinary Machine	2005	
"O' Sailor" †	Fiona Apple	Fiona Apple	Extraordinary Machine	2005	
"Oh Well"	Fiona Apple	Fiona Apple	Extraordinary Machine	2005	
"On I Go"	Fiona Apple	Fiona Apple	Fetch the Bolt Cutters	2020	
"On the Bound"	Fiona Apple	Fiona Apple	When the Pawn...	1999	
"Parting Gift" †	Fiona Apple	Fiona Apple	Extraordinary Machine	2005	
"Pale September"	Fiona Apple	Fiona Apple	Tidal	1996	
"Paper Bag" †	Fiona Apple	Fiona Apple	When the Pawn...	1999	
"Periphery"	Fiona Apple	Fiona Apple	The Idler Wheel...	2012	
"Please Please Please"	Fiona Apple	Fiona Apple	Extraordinary Machine	2005	
"Please Send Me Someone to Love"	Fiona Apple	Percy Mayfield	Pleasantville	1998	
"Pure Imagination"	Fiona Apple	Leslie Bricusse; Anthony Newley	—N/a	2013	
"Rack of His"	Fiona Apple	Fiona Apple	Fetch the Bolt Cutters	2020	
"Red Red Red"	Fiona Apple	Fiona Apple	Extraordinary Machine	2005	
"Regret"	Fiona Apple	Fiona Apple	The Idler Wheel...	2012	
"Relay"	Fiona Apple	Fiona Apple	Fetch the Bolt Cutters	2020	
"River, Stay Away from My Door"	Fiona Apple	Traditional	Extraordinary Machine [Germany Bonus DVD]	2006	
"Sally's Song"	Fiona Apple	Danny Elfman	The Nightmare Before Christmas	2006	
"Shadowboxer" †	Fiona Apple	Fiona Apple	Tidal	1996	
"Shameika" †	Fiona Apple	Fiona Apple	Fetch the Bolt Cutters	2020	
"Sleep to Dream" †	Fiona Apple	Fiona Apple	Tidal	1996	
"Slow Like Honey" †	Fiona Apple	Fiona Apple	Tidal	1996	
"So Sleepy"	Fiona Apple featuring Jon Brion and the Punch Brothers	826LA	Chickens in Love	2010	
"Still I"	Christophe Deluy featuring Fiona Apple	Unknown	—N/a	2006	
"Sullen Girl"	Fiona Apple	Fiona Apple	Tidal	1996	
"To Your Love"	Fiona Apple	Fiona Apple	When the Pawn...	1999	
"Tymps (The Sick in the Head Song)"	Fiona Apple	Fiona Apple	Extraordinary Machine	2005	
"Under The Table"	Fiona Apple	Fiona Apple	Fetch the Bolt Cutters	2020	
"Valentine"	Fiona Apple	Fiona Apple	The Idler Wheel...	2012	
"Waltz (Better Than Fine)"	Fiona Apple	Fiona Apple	Extraordinary Machine	2005	
"The Way Things Are"	Fiona Apple	Fiona Apple	When the Pawn...	1999	
"Werewolf" †	Fiona Apple	Fiona Apple	The Idler Wheel...	2012	
"Why Try to Change Me Now"	Fiona Apple	Cy Coleman; Joseph A. McCarthy	The Best Is Yet to Come: The Songs of Cy Coleman	2009	
"Window"	Fiona Apple	Fiona Apple	Extraordinary Machine	2005	
"You Belong to Me"	Fiona Apple	Billy Rose; Lee David	Extraordinary Machine [Germany Bonus DVD]	2006	
"You're the One I Love"	Sara Watkins featuring Fiona Apple	Felice and Boudleaux Bryant	Sun Midnight Sun	2012	
