= Fiona Apple discography =

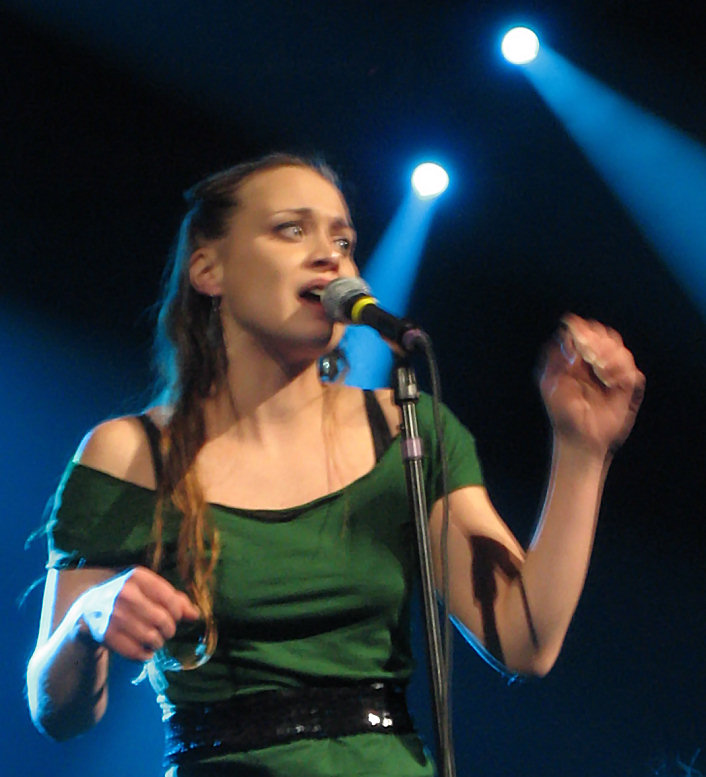
- Fiona Apple performing in 2006
- Studio albums: 5
- Compilation albums: 1
- Singles: 17
- Music videos: 18

The discography of American singer-songwriter and pianist Fiona Apple consists of five studio albums, one compilation album, 17 singles, and 18 music videos.

In 1994, Apple signed a record deal with The Work Group and Columbia Records, and began recording material for her debut album Tidal. It became a commercial success, certified three times platinum by the Recording Industry Association of America (RIAA). It established Apple's presence in the music industry. The album produced the Grammy Award-winning controversial single "Criminal". In 1998, The Work Group was absorbed by Epic Records, which then released Apple's second album, known as When the Pawn... in 1999. The album's full title currently holds the record for the third-longest album title. It was certified platinum by the RIAA. In 2002, Apple began recording her third studio album, Extraordinary Machine, which was delayed for more than three years, eventually being bootlegged in 2004. Extraordinary Machine featured an art pop-oriented sound and was finally released in 2005. Like its predecessor, it was also certified gold by the RIAA. In 2008, Apple went on a hiatus while secretly recording new material for her fourth studio album, The Idler Wheel.... The album was released in 2012, seven years after the release of Extraordinary Machine. Almost eight years passed until the release of her fifth studio album in 2020, Fetch the Bolt Cutters. Fetch the Bolt Cutters peaked at number 1 on the US Billboard Top Album Sales chart, which was her first album to peak at number 1 on an all-genre album chart in the United States.

== Albums ==
=== Studio albums ===
List of studio albums, with selected chart positions and certifications
Title	Album details	Peak chart positions										Sales	Certifications
Title	Album details	US	AUS	BEL	CAN	FRA	GER	JPN	NZ	POR	UK	Sales	Certifications
Tidal	Released: July 23, 1996 (US); Label: Columbia, Work, Clean Slate; Formats: CD, LP, CS, MD, digital download, streaming	15	43	48	35	21	—	—	22	—	—	US: 2,900,000	RIAA: 3× Platinum; BPI: Silver; MC: Platinum; SNEP: Gold
When the Pawn...	Released: November 9, 1999 (US); Labels: Epic, Clean Slate; Formats: CD, LP, CS, MD, digital download, streaming	13	54	—	6	32	66	39	—	—	46	US: 922,000	RIAA: Platinum; BPI: Silver; RIAJ: Gold
Extraordinary Machine	Released: October 4, 2005 (US); Labels: Epic, Clean Slate; Formats: CD, LP, DualDisc, digital download, streaming	7	53	—	29	61	—	44	—	—	—	US: 1,000,000	RIAA: Gold
The Idler Wheel...	Released: June 19, 2012 (US); Labels: Epic, Clean Slate; Formats: CD, CD+DVD, LP, digital download, streaming	3	23	116	13	54	56	68	30	20	68	US: 205,000	
Fetch the Bolt Cutters	Released: April 17, 2020; Labels: Epic, Clean Slate; Formats: Digital download, streaming, CD, LP, cassette	4 (Note: Fetch the Bolt Cutters also peaked at number 1 on the US Billboard Top Album Sales chart.)	13	26	10	97	20	42	14	4	33		
"—" denotes a recording that did not chart or was not released in that territory.

=== Compilation albums ===
List of compilation albums
Title	Album details	Peak chart positions
Title	Album details	US Dig.
iTunes Originals	Released: February 14, 2006 (US); Label: Epic, Clean Slate; Formats: Digital download	6

== Singles ==
List of singles, with selected chart positions, showing year released and album name
Title	Year	Peak chart positions										Certifications	Album
Title	Year	US	US Alt. Airplay	US AAA	US Rock & Alt.	AUS	BEL (FL) Tip	CAN Alt.	JPN	NZ Hot	UK	Certifications	Album
"Shadowboxer"	1996	—	34	12	—	—	—	—	—	—	—		Tidal
"Sleep to Dream"	1997	—	28	11	—	—	—	—	—	—	79		Tidal
"The First Taste"	1997	—	—	—	—	—	—	—	—	—	—		Tidal
"Criminal"	1997	21	4	2	— (Note: "Criminal" did not enter the Hot Rock Songs, but peaked at number 35 on the Rock Digital Song Sales chart.)	51	—	9	—	—	—	RIAA: Platinum	Tidal
"Never Is a Promise"	1997	—	—	—	—	—	—	—	—	—	—		Tidal
"Across the Universe"	1998	—	—	—	—	—	—	—	—	—	—		Pleasantville soundtrack
"Fast as You Can"	1999	—	20	8	—	—	—	—	—	—	33		When the Pawn...
"Limp"	2000	—	—	—	—	—	—	—	—	—	—		When the Pawn...
"Paper Bag"	2000	—	—	—	—	—	—	—	—	—	—		When the Pawn...
"O' Sailor"	2005	—	—	—	—	—	—	—	—	—	—		Extraordinary Machine
"Parting Gift"	2005	—	—	—	—	—	—	—	—	—	—		Extraordinary Machine
"Not About Love"	2006	—	—	—	—	—	—	—	—	—	—		Extraordinary Machine
"Get Him Back"	2006	—	—	—	—	—	—	—	—	—	—		Extraordinary Machine
"Every Single Night"	2012	—	—	—	—	—	—	—	72	—	—		The Idler Wheel...
"Pure Imagination"	2013	— (Note: "Pure Imagination" did not enter the Billboard Hot 100, but peaked at number four on the Bubbling Under Hot 100 Singles chart, which acts as an extension to the Hot 100.)	—	—	—	—	—	—	—	—	—		Non-album single
"Shameika"	2020	—	—	19	15	—	43	—	—	32	—		Fetch the Bolt Cutters
"Pretrial (Let Her Go Home)"	2025	—	—	—	—	—	—	—	—	—	—		Non-album single
"—" denotes a recording that did not chart or was not released in that territory.

== Other charted songs ==
Title	Year	Peak chart positions		Album
Title	Year	US Rock	NZ Hot	Album
"I Want You to Love Me"	2020	10	25	Fetch the Bolt Cutters
"Fetch the Bolt Cutters"	2020	21	37	Fetch the Bolt Cutters
"Under the Table"	2020	27	40	Fetch the Bolt Cutters
"Relay"	2020	32	—	Fetch the Bolt Cutters
"—" denotes releases that did not chart.

== Other appearances ==
List of songs released on albums that were not studio albums released by Apple
Title	Year	Other artist(s)	Album
"Please Send Me Someone to Love"	1998	—N/a	Pleasantville: Music from the Motion Picture
"Bridge over Troubled Water"	2002	Johnny Cash	American IV: The Man Comes Around
"Father and Son"	2003	Johnny Cash	Unearthed
"Frosty the Snowman"	2003	—N/a	Christmas Calling
"It's Only a Paper Moon"	2005	Maude Maggart	With Sweet Despair
"A Sleeping Bee"	2005	Maude Maggart	With Sweet Despair
"I Want You"	2006	Elvis Costello	Elvis Costello – in Concert
"Sally's Song"	2006	—N/a	The Nightmare Before Christmas (soundtrack)
"Come On and Get It (Up in 'Dem Guts)"	2006	Zach Galifianakis	—N/a
"Angel Eyes"	2008	—N/a	Largo Film
"Still I"	2008	Christophe Deluy	—N/a
"Why Try to Change Me Now"	2009	—N/a	The Best Is Yet to Come: The Songs of Cy Coleman
"I Walk a Little Faster"	2009	—N/a	The Best Is Yet to Come: The Songs of Cy Coleman
"Hey Big Dog"	2010	Margaret Cho	Cho Dependent
"So Sleepy"	2010	Jon Brion, Punch Brothers	Chickens in Love
"Everyday"	2011	Jon Brion	Rave On Buddy Holly
"You're the One I Love"	2012	Sara Watkins	Sun Midnight Sun
"Take Up Your Spade"	2012	Sara Watkins, Jackson Browne	Sun Midnight Sun
"Dull Tool"	2012	—N/a	This Is 40 (soundtrack)
"Container"	2014	—N/a	opening theme from The Affair
"I'm in the Middle of a Riddle"	2014	Maude Maggart	Sweetheart 2014
"Banks of the Ohio"	2015	Sean Watkins	—N/a
"Left Handed Kisses"	2016	Andrew Bird	Are You Serious
"I Can't Wait to Meet You"	2018	—N/a	Hopes & Dreams: The Lullaby Project
"In My Room"	2019	—N/a	Echo in the Canyon (soundtrack)
"It Won't Be Wrong"	2019	—N/a	Echo in the Canyon (soundtrack)
"Don't Worry 'bout Me"	2019	Jeff Goldblum	I Shouldn't Be Telling You This
"7 O'Clock News/Silent Night"	2019	Phoebe Bridgers, Matt Berninger	—N/a
"Shameika Said"	2020	Shameika	—N/a
"Murder Most Foul"	2020	Bob Dylan	Rough and Rowdy Ways
"Love More"	2021	Sharon van Etten	Epic Ten
"(Remember Me) I'm the One Who Loves You"	2022	Watkins Family Hour	Vol. II
"Where the Shadows Lie"	2022	Bear McCreary	The Lord of the Rings: The Rings of Power (Season One: Amazon Original Series Soundtrack)
"Lately"	2024	—N/a	Tonight I'll Go Down Swingin': Tribute to Don Heffington

== Music videos ==
List of music videos, showing year released and director
Title	Year	Director(s)
"Shadowboxer"	1996	Jim Gable
"The First Taste"	1997	Dewey Nicks
"Sleep to Dream"	1997	Stéphane Sednaoui
"Criminal"	1997	Mark Romanek
"Never Is a Promise"	1997	Stéphane Sednaoui
"Across the Universe"	1998	Paul Thomas Anderson
"Fast as You Can"	1999	Paul Thomas Anderson
"Limp"	2000	Paul Thomas Anderson
"Paper Bag"	2000	Paul Thomas Anderson
"Parting Gift"	2005	Spencer Maggart
"O' Sailor"	2005	Floria Sigismondi
"Not About Love"	2006	Michael Blieden
"Hey Big Dog" (Margret Cho featuring Fiona Apple)	2010	
"Every Single Night"	2012	Joseph Cahill
"Hot Knife"	2013	Paul Thomas Anderson
"Left Handed Kisses" (Andrew Bird featuring Fiona Apple)	2016	Phil Andelman
"Shameika" / "Shameika" (Process Video)	2020	Matthias Brown
"Pretrial (Let Her Go Home)"	2025	Frederic T. Brehm
