= ITunes Originals – Fiona Apple =

iTunes Originals – Fiona Apple

Compilation album by Fiona Apple
- Released: February 14, 2006
- Length: 92:24
- Label: Epic

Fiona Apple chronology
Extraordinary Machine (2005)	iTunes Originals – Fiona Apple (2006)	The Idler Wheel... (2012)

iTunes Originals – Fiona Apple is an iTunes Originals release by American singer-songwriter Fiona Apple, released in the United States on February 14, 2006 (see 2006 in music) and later released in the UK in December 2007. It consists of live tracks, previously released studio tracks, and interview tracks.

The album was released solely as a digital download through iTunes. The album held the record for most sales in a single week for a digital-only album, until Gnarls Barkley received more for their album St. Elsewhere, which was digital-only for a week before its physical album release.

== Track listing ==
1. "iTunes Originals" - 0:04
2. "Tymps (the Sick in the Head Song)" - 4:03
3. "I Want to Make People Happy" (interview) - 4:05
4. "Never Is a Promise" - 5:54
5. "It Didn't Turn out How I Expected It to Turn Out" (interview) - 1:54
6. "Criminal" (iTunes Originals version) - 4:23
7. "I Can't Remember How I Got There" (interview) - 1:23
8. "Shadowboxer" (iTunes Originals version) - 6:16
9. "A 90 Word Album Title" (interview) - 2:33
10. "Fast as You Can" (iTunes Originals version) - 4:52
11. "Your Crowbar, So Far" (interview) - 1:00
12. "I Know" (iTunes Originals version) - 5:23
13. "It Was Just a Plastic Bag" (interview) - 1:53
14. "Paper Bag" - 3:39
15. "The Making of Extraordinary Machine" (interview) - 10:29
16. "O' Sailor" - 5:36
17. "A Pep Talk to Myself" (interview) - 2:05
18. "Extraordinary Machine" (iTunes Originals version) - 3:51
19. "A Bird's Eye View of All of My Relationships" (interview) - 1:43
20. "Get Him Back" (iTunes Originals version) - 4:57
21. "I Just Wanted to Leave" (interview) - 0:39
22. "Window" - 5:32
23. "Finding the Key" (interview) - 2:13
24. "Better Version of Me" - 3:00
25. "I'm Feeling Hopeful" (interview) - 1:27
26. "Waltz (Better Than Fine)" - 3:46
