= Twang Twang Shock-A-Boom =

Band

Twang Twang Shock A Boom is an acoustic three-piece band led by Davíd Garza with Jeff Haley and Chris Searles. The name is derived from the sounds of the guitar, bass, and drums.

== Early career ==
For 10 months, the trio of Davíd Garza, Jeff Haley, and Chris Searles played humorous tunes with the bare-bones setup of guitar, upright bass, and a guitar case standing in for drums. It began when Garza and his music-school friends decided to busk in the West Mall of Austin, Texas for a little extra cash. Within two weeks they had landed paying gigs at the Cactus Cafe. Their first cassette, Me So Twangy sold well at shows on the strength of Garza’s charm and erudite hippie-boy raps Twang Twang quickly began getting invited into venues such as Cactus Cafe, Texas Tavern, Cannibal Club, and Liberty Lunch while their self-released cassette “Me So Twangy” sold well at Waterloo Records in Austin.

"We improvise like jazz musicians, but we play original pop songs with acoustic instruments", Garza said in an interview published in The New York Times.

== Audition at CBS ==
Columbia Records A&R man Larry Hamby saw Twang Twang at an in-store performance during Austin's South By Southwest music festival. Hamby spent a few minutes watching the band and the next hour on the sidewalk talking to the band's manager.

"We were signed as far as he was concerned," says Searles. "And he just had to get us up to the label to get them really pumped."

Hamby was impressed, and the band's manager, Mark Proct (who now handles Storyville and Jimmie Vaughan) also managed an act already within the Columbia group of labels - a group that was actually moving records for CBS: the Fabulous Thunderbirds. Thus, Twang Twang landed an audition in New York City.

"We flew up to New York," remembers Searles. "And we had never really been out of Austin. We really didn't know what was happening - LaGuardia, the limo, the whole deal - but the next day we ended up in the boardroom of Blackrock, which used to be the big tower for CBS."

"They had us play in the boardroom, with barely enough space for a band. A giant long conference table, and a bunch of New Yorkers with their $500 briefcases and $3,000 suits - they were all there, man. Everybody on the staff was required to be there. It was a really big deal - anyone associated with A&R, it was a big deal. We didn't really know that, but it was packed in the room. We knew that much.

"So I had my West Mall getup, which was like a washboard and bongos. It wasn't very impressive, I'm sure. And Jeff had an upright and Davíd was trying to make cracks about Paul Simon. He thought Simon was on CBS, but actually he had just scored big with Rhythm of the Saints on Warner Bros., so those jokes were not funny. Everything Davíd said just fell to the floor and his voice got really tight and he couldn't sing very well; I'm sure they just thought we were ridiculous ultimately.

"But the story is that (CBS CEO) Tommy Mottola, after asking us a few polite questions said, 'You boys been up to the Empire State building?'

"'No sir, we sure haven't.'

"'Well, you ought to get up there. Get yourselves a good look around. Get the lay of the land up here in New York, because it will probably be a good long while before you get back up here again.'

"And he said it so smooth, so fast," recalls Searles. "We just kind of smiled and had no idea what he was saying. We were rookies. I had no idea what was going on. But every briefcase zipped up and closed and everyone sat up straight in their chairs. It was over.

The band broke up not too soon after this failed audition, citing artistic differences and personality conflicts. David Garza was signed to Lava (Atlantic) Records in 1996. Lava Atlantic is a subsidiary of Warner Music Group.

== Success ==
The group’s album, Me So Twangy, won Best Tape at the Austin Music Awards in 1990 and was described by Peter Blackstock of The Austin American Statesman as: "reminded him of outtakes from a very early Beatles recording session."

== Members ==
- Davíd Garza- vocals and lead guitar
- Jeff Haley- back-up vocals, bass
- Chris Searles- vocals, percussion.

== Discography ==
- Twang Twang Shock A Boom (The First Semester) (1989)
- It’s A Twang Thang (1990)
- Me So Twangy (1990)
- Twanger (1990)
- Local Licks Live 1990
- Miracle Twang (1995)
- #hashTwang (2014)
- Twanger 1990 (2015)
- Live at the Cactus (2020)
