= Not About Love =

2006 song performed by Fiona Apple

Single by Fiona Apple

from the album Extraordinary Machine
- Released: January 2006 (U.S.)
- Studio: Phantom Studios, LA and Stanley Recordings, Venice, CA
- Genre: Alternative rock; jazz
- Length: 4:21
- Label: Epic
- Songwriter(s): Fiona Apple
- Producer(s): Mike Elizondo; Brian Kehew

Fiona Apple singles chronology
"Parting Gift" (2005)	"Not About Love" (2006)	"Get Him Back" (2006)

Music video
- "Not About Love" on YouTube

"Not About Love" is a song written by American singer-songwriter Fiona Apple and produced by Mike Elizondo and Brian Kehew for her third studio album Extraordinary Machine (2005). It was released as the album's third single in January 2006.

== History ==
"Not About Love" was the first song from Extraordinary Machine that Apple performed in public; she debuted it at a live concert with Jon Brion in February 2002. In 2003, the album, which was originally produced by Brion, was submitted to Sony Music executives, who were reportedly unenthusiastic about the finished product and shelved it. On February 26, 2005, radio DJ Andrew Harms at 107.7 The End in Seattle began playing previously unheard tracks from a bootleg copy of Extraordinary Machine, and before long, poor quality copies of "Not About Love", "Get Him Back" and "Used to Love Him" were circulating on the internet. Soon after, CD-quality versions of all the tracks were released through the BitTorrent website TorrentBox.

Slant magazine described the leaked version of "Not About Love" as "defiant, a poetic, regret-filled account of the morning after secrets were spilled". The Akron Beacon Journal speculated the song was "the big turnoff for the bean counters [at Sony] ... [it] has a rolling circular piano line and no beat aside from the sawing of the lush, swelling string arrangement", and a review in Okayplayer called it "brilliant. It sounds like a portion of a ballet movement with a very dramatic ending".

An extensively reworked version of Extraordinary Machine, co-produced by Mike Elizondo and Brian Kehew, was released in October 2005. A critic for Seattle Weekly expressed his preference for the new version of "Not About Love": "Brion's busy cello keeps hounding Apple, getting in your ear while you're trying to figure out what the poor girl's trying to say ... Elizondo, in contrast, merely pairs the piano with light-handed percussion, which creates drama — not melodrama, as per Brion". In comparison, Pitchfork Media wrote "On "Not About Love" and "O' Sailor", Brion scored Apple's compositions no less extravagantly than his soundtracking work for the indie-film elite, applying dollops of lush orchestration ... [but] Elizondo hacks away Brion's embellishments upon "Not About Love" and "Window" in his efforts to keep the spotlight fixed solely on [Apple]".

== Video ==
Fiona Apple with comedian Zach Galifianakis in the "Not About Love" music video.

The single's video, directed and edited by Michael Blieden, premiered on Apple's official website in August 2005. It features Apple and comedian Zach Galifianakis in bed together, and later walking the streets and they appear to be a couple whose relationship is on the rocks, while Galifianakis lip syncs the song. Originally filmed for the DualDisc edition of Extraordinary Machine, the video made its internet premiere outside of Apple's official site on January 13 at AOL Music, and it debuted on the television channel VH1 on January 23.

It was shot in one day on digital video at Galifianakis' house and the surrounding neighbourhood. Apple was friends with Galifianakis as they both performed regularly at Club Largo, and she asked him to participate in the "Not About Love" video after watching a video of him lip synching an Anita Baker song. She said she chose "Not About Love" as the song for which the video would be filmed as "[it] has a lot of tempo changes in it and it's this sort of like schizo song". She also told MTV News that she had hoped the "Not About Love" video would become an official video, and described it as "a weird goal because the whole thing is pretty low-key". The video was popular on the internet and received substantial airplay on vh1 and mtvU, an MTV channel for college and university campuses.

== Musical credits ==
- Fiona Apple – piano, vocals
- Mike Elizondo – Moog bass
- Brian Kehew – guitar
- Ahmir "Questlove" Thompson – drums
