= Every Single Night =

Single by Fiona Apple

from the album The Idler Wheel...
- Released: April 24, 2012
- Studio: Stanley Recordings (Venice, Los Angeles); NBB Studio (New York City)
- Genre: Alternative pop; art pop
- Length: 3:33
- Label: Epic
- Songwriter: Fiona Apple
- Producers: Fiona Apple; Charley Drayton

Fiona Apple singles chronology
"Get Him Back" (2006)	"Every Single Night" (2012)	"Pure Imagination" (2013)

Music video
- "Every Single Night" on YouTube

"Every Single Night" is a song written and recorded by American singer-songwriter Fiona Apple. It was released as the only single from her fourth studio album, The Idler Wheel..., on April 24, 2012, by Epic Records.

== Background and release ==
"Every Single Night" marked Fiona Apple's first single in six years since "Get Him Back" (2006). She began writing and recording the song in secret, unbeknownst to her label Epic. She and producer Charley Drayton opted to use minimal musical arrangement in the song by performing on a celesta and a marimba. The song chronicles what Apple used to dream every night; "Every single night's a fight with my brain."

Apple first performed the song during the South by Southwest (SXSW) festival in Austin, Texas, in 2012. The music video of the song premiered on the Sundance Channel on June 10, 2012, and was directed by Joseph Cahill in Paris, France. It features scenes of Apple in a bed with a Minotaur, with snails, feeding an alligator, and wearing an octopus for a hat. Michaell Cragg of The Guardian remarked of the video, "The singer seems to have gone Gaga with her new video, in which she sports a squid headpiece and snail ensemble." Rolling Stone compared the video to Apple's controversial music video of her single "Criminal" (1996), saying, "It's sort of like her breakthrough video for 1996's "Criminal," if it took place at a wildlife preserve instead of a seedy house party."

== Chart performance and critical reception ==
Following the release of The Idler Wheel..., the song debuted at 72 on the Billboard Japan Hot 100 chart on the week ending July 21, 2012, marking her first entry on the chart. Even though the song failed to enter any of the Billboard charts in the United States, the song has received critical acclaim from critics, with some citing it as the highlight of the album. Jillian Mapes of Billboard commented, "Needless to say, Apple's single isn't a "Criminal" sequel, and radio airplay doesn't appear to be the goal here. Yet it's fair to deem "Every Single Night" a triumphant comeback by being exactly what Apple's cult of devotees has been yearning for." She also remarked following the album's release that "Musically, the song straddles the line between childlike and eerie, led by a music box toy piano and Apple's own tribal yodeling." Robbie Daw of Idolator offered a mixed review by calling the song a "delicate and quirky track". Stephen Thomas Erlewine of AllMusic commented on the song's non-single nature, saying, "Some hooks are stronger than others – "Periphery" cuts to the quick, whereas "Every Single Night" surges—but what was rumored about Extraordinary Machine (2005) is actually true about The Idler Wheel..: there are no singles here, nothing concise and concentrated to facilitate an easy sell... Lacking either ornate production or a pop single, The Idler Wheel... plays like Fiona Apple at her purest and that's plenty complicated."

== Influence ==
According to Panic! At the Disco vocalist Brendon Urie, "Every Single Night" was the inspiration for the 2013 hit "Miss Jackson" (featuring Lolo) from their album Too Weird to Live, Too Rare to Die!, which was originally named "Bad Apple" (after Fiona Apple, who rejected usage of a sample from her song).

"Every Single Night" was sampled in rapper Lil Nas X's song "Kim Jong" off of his 2018 mixtape Nasarati. In a viral video posted in 2019, Apple called out Lil Nas X, asking him, "Where's my money, you cute little guy?

== Track listing ==
Digital download

1. "Every Single Night" - 3:33

7" single

1. "Every Single Night" - 3:33
2. "Anything We Want" (live version) - 4:40

== Personnel ==
- Fiona Apple (Feedy) - vocals, celesta, percussion, piano, keyboard bass
- Charley Drayton (Seedy) - drums, percussion, marimba
- Sebastian Steinberg - acoustic bass

== Charts ==
Chart (2012)	Peak position
Japan Hot 100 (Billboard)	72

== Release history ==
Country	Date	Format	Label	Catalog
United States	April 24, 2012	7" single, digital download	Epic Records	88725-42256-7
Canada	April 24, 2012	7" single, digital download	Sony Music	88725-42256-7
