= David Garza (musician) =

American musician (born 1971)

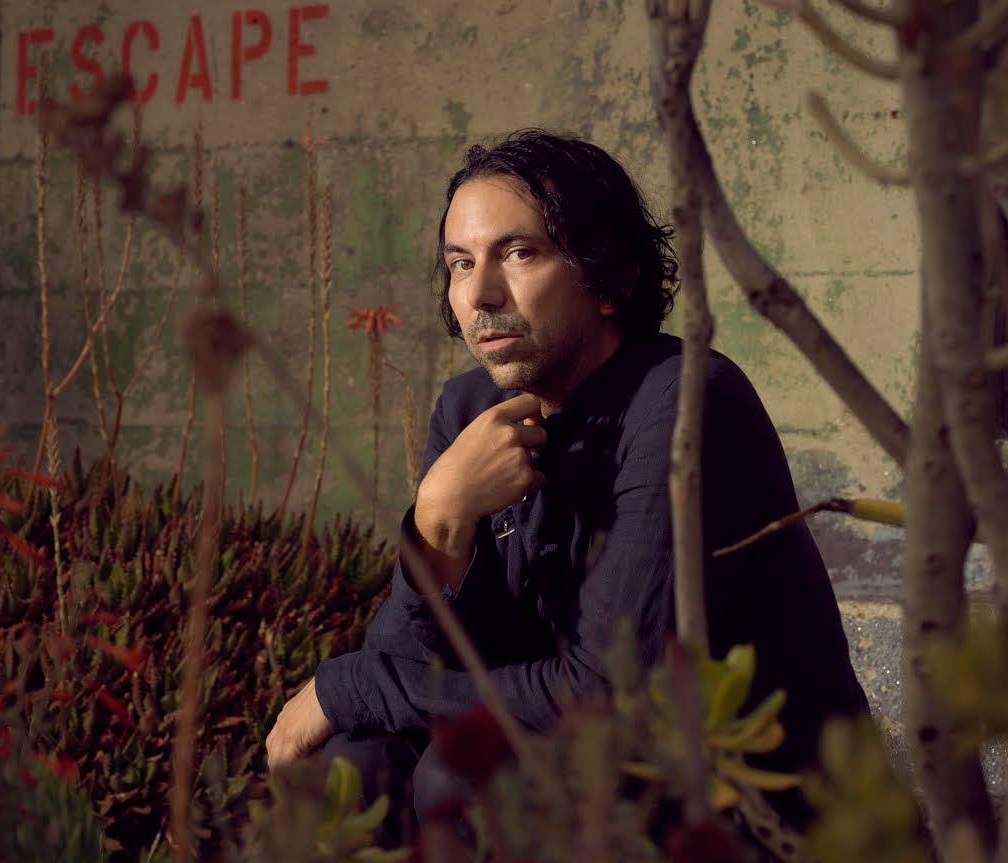

Background information
- Born: February 4, 1971 (age 55); Irving, Texas, United States
- Genre: Indie rock
- Occupations: Musician, songwriter, producer
- Instruments: Vocals, guitar, keyboard instruments, drums, bass guitar
- Years active: 1989–present
- Labels: Wide Open Records, Lava/Atlantic
- Website: Davidgarza.com

David Garza (pronounced Dah-veed; born February 4, 1971) is an American record producer, singer-songwriter, multi-instrumentalist, composer, and visual artist, who has crafted a 35-year repertoire of over 400 original compositions.

== Biography ==
David Garza is a third-generation Mexican-American and Dallas-area native. His musical journey began with his band The Happy Farmers. They opened shows for such Dallas Deep Ellum faves of the era Edie Brickell & New Bohemians, Ten Hands, and Fever in the Funkhouse at Club Dada. At just age 18, he won a classical guitar scholarship to the University of Texas at Austin University of Texas and relocated to Austin in 1989. Garza had met Austinites Chris Searles and Jeff Haley through scholastic music events in high school. Together the trio formed Twang Twang Shock-A-Boom bringing their unique sound—featuring acoustic guitar, upright bass, and bongos—to the West Mall of the UT campus.

The acoustic three-piece band "went from playing the West Mall on the University of Texas campus for fun and tips to packing a thousand or so fans into Liberty Lunch and showcasing at the headquarters of CBS Records (now Sony Music)".

After leaving the group Twang Twang Shock A Boom to go solo, Garza formed a new band and gigged continually around and outside the Texas area, billed as David Garza & The Lovebeads and later as DAH-VEED. In the mid-1990s he had his brush with the major-label world, signing with Lava/Atlantic, but eventually returned to his street-performer roots, releasing nearly an album a year since.

Garza released a flurry of solo cassettes and CDs, selling them for $5 and $10, respectively. He called this the "Single Bill Theory", one he maintains to the present day. Garza performed tirelessly on the regional club and college circuit, ultimately striking a major-label deal, in 1996. Initially, Garza rebuffed various major label recording offers, choosing instead to record and distribute music on his own label, Wide Open Records. After independently releasing nine records and selling 30,000 copies on his own, he eventually signed with Lava/Atlantic and was featured on the Great Expectations soundtrack. His major-label debut, This Euphoria, followed in April 1998.

He took over production duties for his second Lava/Atlantic record, 2001's Overdub, and brought in Will Calhoun and Doug Wimbish, the drummer and bassist of Living Colour as his backup band for the sessions. Juliana Hatfield contributed backing vocals on the song "Keep On Crying."

In 1999, at the height of his touring popularity, Garza was voted second behind Stevie Ray Vaughan as Austin Musician of the Decade (Austin Chronicle).

In 2011, the City of Austin, Texas, declared May 12 "David Garza Day". Soon after, to celebrate what would have been Elliott Smith's 44th birthday on August 6, 2013, Smith's family entrusted Garza to "host a bicoastal tribute to the late pop mystic".

In subsequent years, Garza has returned to releasing his music independently and plays frequently in Texas and in Los Angeles. A series of residency shows at Los Angeles' Club Largo showcased his skill as a solo performer on both piano and guitar. During Garza's live shows, artists including Jon Brion, Nickel Creek, Grant Lee Phillips and Fiona Apple regularly sat in with him. Garza has shared the stage with those including Jackson Browne, John Paul Jones, Los Lobos, Pearl Jam, St. Vincent, Meshell Ndegeocello, Andrew Bird, Natalia LaFourcade, Chris Thile, Ben Harper. He has also done extensive work as a producer and session musician, composer, and visual artist.

In 2020 he was a musician on, co-produced and created the album artwork for the Fiona Apple release Fetch The Bolt Cutters.

== Compositions, scoring and production ==
Garza contributed music on film scores for Wretches & Jabberers (2011), Garnet’s Gold (2014) and Racing Extinction (2015).

In 2016, Garza produced Nina Diaz (of Girl in a Coma) first solo record The Beat is Dead.

In 2019, Garza composed the original score for the HBO film Running with Beto

In 2020, Garza co-produced, played multiple instruments on and made the album artwork for Fiona Apple's Fetch The Bolt Cutters The album's artwork was designed by band member Davíd Garza, following the decision to release the album early. Apple sent him a photo she had taken of herself "two or three" years earlier, and saved as a potential cover photo. On the choice of photograph, she commented: "That face is very much me. I just wanted to be like, 'Hey, guess what? I'm back! Here are some songs. Want to listen to the music, huh? Hi, hi, hi, hi."

Fetch the Bolt Cutters was met with universal acclaim, with many critics deeming it an instant classic, a masterpiece, and Apple's best work to date. At review aggregator Metacritic, the release received a weighted average score of 98 out of 100, based on 28 reviews, making it the second-highest rated album in the website's history. It is also the second-highest rated album on AnyDecentMusic?, with an average rating of 9.2/10, from 25 critics' assessments. According to Tom Hull, it was the "best regarded/most hyped album of the year". At the 63rd Annual Grammy Awards, Fetch the Bolt Cutters won the Grammy Award for Best Alternative Music Album, while "Shameika" won the Grammy Award for Best Rock Performance.

In 2020, Garza co-produced Sparta's album, Trust The River. Jim Ward says of working with David Garza as the producer of Sparta's album Trust The River, "He helped me whittle it down to about 14 songs. I've known David for 20 years, we had never done a full length record together but he is a real inspiration to me. He is as much my spiritual guru as producer".

In 2021, Midland released The Sonic Ranch documentary and soundtrack (Big Machine). Garza "produced these sessions and had a role in helping to shape the trio’s sound. The dozen tracks here are more intimately presented than the music on their subsequent albums, making 'The Sonic Ranch' arguably the best document of the band's musical identity yet".

In 2022 Hanson released the album RGB (Red Green Blue). Red Green Blue is a blend of a five-song mini album crafted by each individual brother: RED for Taylor, GREEN for Isaac and BLUE for Zac. Each brother produced their third of the album individually with the help of Garza and award-winning producer Jim Scott, with two of the three band members, Zac and Taylor, writing all their songs, whereas Isaac wrote a couple of songs, covered a song of their younger brother Mac's band, and co-wrote the remaining songs.

In 2022 David produced Ozomatli whose creativity and stronger-than-ever brotherhood culminated in their latest album, 'Marching On,' produced by David Garza at El Paso's Sonic Ranch. The LP's 11 songs showcase a unified blend of the members' influences and ideas. Notable collaborations include J.J. Fad and Lisa Lisa on 'Fellas,' and 'Mi Destino,' featuring Cypress Hill's B-Real and Guatemalan singer-songwriter Gaby Moreno.

In 2023 Irish singer-songwriter Ultan Conlon found a haven for his unique sound and sensibility with David Garza producing his fifth record, The Starlight Ballroom.

In 2024 David Garza co-produced Fastball with John Fields. Reviewer Austin Chronicle stated "Garza and Fields proved to be magical additions to the band's dynamic. Garza has a mind for sound and space that complements the beautifully simplistic musicianship of Tony Scalzo, Miles Zuniga, and Joey Shuffield. Fields, meanwhile, adds touches of magic that truly allow every idea to flourish. They exchange energy among themselves like sibling souls".

Also in 2024 Garza contributed original music to Pack One Bag, a podcast that tells the true tale of a family fleeing fascist Italy at the dawn of World War II. Featuring a love story, plot twists, and the voice acting of Stanley Tucci.

In 2024 Garza produced Suzanna Choffel, his longtime friend/collaborator. On the record entitled Bird By Bird, drummer Amy Wood and bassist Sebastian Steinberg play on the album including its title track. Recorded at Sonic Ranch in West Texas.

Also in 2024 Lucy Woodward's Stories From The Dust was crafted with co-producer and co-writer David Garza, who was at the helm of most of the songs on the album. "Its tracks and melodies pull you toward Woodward’s poignant insights of matters of the heart in the world’s fragile present. Garza and Woodward spent several weeks in downtown Los Angeles writing these stories about women, the ones she grew up with – the fiercely independent and unconventional women who raised her – and those she merely observed from afar, whether in the sandbox or on the subway. Woodward soon found herself writing songs like she'd never written before, or had never even thought about writing before".

== Collaborations and session work ==
Throughout his career, David Garza has done studio and live session work for a number of artists. He contributed guitar and production to Juliana Hatfield's Beautiful Creature in 2000, and toured as keyboardist for Alejandro Escovedo in 2001. The same year, he played on the soundtrack for the film Spy Kids.

In 2002, he worked with Rhett Miller on The Instigator, and in 2004 he appeared on Hanson's record Underneath. In 2005, he toured with Fiona Apple on her Extraordinary Machine tour, performing both as the opening act and as a guitarist in her backing band.

In 2006, Garza played baritone guitar on the Revolting Cocks Cocked and Loaded album, and Al Jourgensen later added vocals to “Minority Boys Got $” on Garza's 2008 album Dream Delay.

Garza played guitar and sang back-up vocals on the 2007 John Legend single "Sun Comes Up".

Since 2008, Garza has regularly toured and recorded with Gaby Moreno.

He collaborated with comedian, actress, and singer-songwriter Margaret Cho’s 2016 album American Myth.

In 2020, Garza was a guest vocalist and piano player on the Watkins Family Hour studio album entitled Brother Sister, joining Gaby Moreno and John C. Reilly on a cover of Charley Jordan’s "Keep It Clean".

2022: guitar for Laura Monroe.

2024: Garza serves as musical director for John C Reilly is Mister Romantic, a "vaudeville-tinged show, which intermixes loose comic routines with a musical set list inspired by the Great American Songbook."

2024: Garza contributed guitar, zither, and piano to Light Verse, Iron & Wine's seventh studio album.

== Discography ==
- Just Say Love (1991)
- Summer Songs 1 (1991)
- Summer Songs 2 (1992)
- Eyes Wide Open (1992)
- Culture Vulture (1993)
- Conmigo (1994)
- Blind Hips In Motion (1995)
- 1000 Copies (1996)
- 4-Track Manifesto EP (1997)
- This Euphoria (1998)
- Kingdom Come and Go (1999)
- Summer Songs 3 (2000)
- Overdub (2001)
- Alarm/Alarm Spring (2002)
- Summer Songs 4 (2002)
- Secret Album (2003)
- Amorea (2003)
- Covers/Colcha (2003)
- Summer Songs 5 (2003)
- A Strange Mess of Flowers (box set) (2004)
- Oh Dread EP (download) (2005)
- May Ides EP (download)(2005)
- Chuy Chuy Yall EP (download) (2005)
- Summer Songs 6 (2005)
- Sound of Music EP (download) (2005)
- David Garza (2005 Tour CD) (2005)
- Slaughterhouse Jive (download)(2008)
- filmusic (download) (2008)
- Dream Delay (2008)
- Summer Songs 7 (2009)
- AD HOC (2009)
- Dream Demos (2009)
- The Road To ACL (2010)
- Oversea (2011)
- Sleep (2012)
- Human Tattoo (2013)
- Ballad of Crybear (2016)
- Lost Rhyme (2019)
