= The Best Is Yet to Come: The Songs of Cy Coleman =

Compilation album by Various artists
- Released: September 2009

The Best Is Yet to Come: The Songs of Cy Coleman is a compilation album and tribute to Cy Coleman, released in September 2009. The album peaked at number 32 of Billboard's Jazz Albums chart.

== Track listing ==
1. "The Best Is Yet to Come" - Patty Griffin (3:44)
2. "I've Got Your Number" - Jill Sobule (2:29)
3. "Why Try to Change Me Now" - Fiona Apple (5:16)
4. "I Live My Love" - Madeleine Peyroux (3:01)
5. "Then Was Then and Now Is Now" - Ambrosia Parsley (6:03)
6. "I'm Gonna Laugh You Right out of My Life" - Julianna Raye (4:09)
7. "You Fascinate Me So" - Sam Phillips (5:11)
8. "Hey Look Me Over" - Perla Batalla (2:51)
9. "Too Many Tomorrows" - Sara Watkins (3:55)
10. "I Walk a Little Faster" - Fiona Apple (5:12)
11. "Where Am I Going?" - Sarabeth Tucek (3:54)
12. "The Rules of the Road" - Nikka Costa (3:34)
13. "(I'm) In Love Again" - Missy Higgins (4:22)

Track listing adapted from Allmusic.
