= Container (song) =

Song by Fiona Apple
- Language: English
- Length: 1:11
- Songwriter: Fiona Apple
- Producer: Blake Mills

"Container" is a song written and performed by American singer-songwriter Fiona Apple and produced by Blake Mills. The song was used for the title sequence of the Showtime drama series The Affair.

== Description and development ==
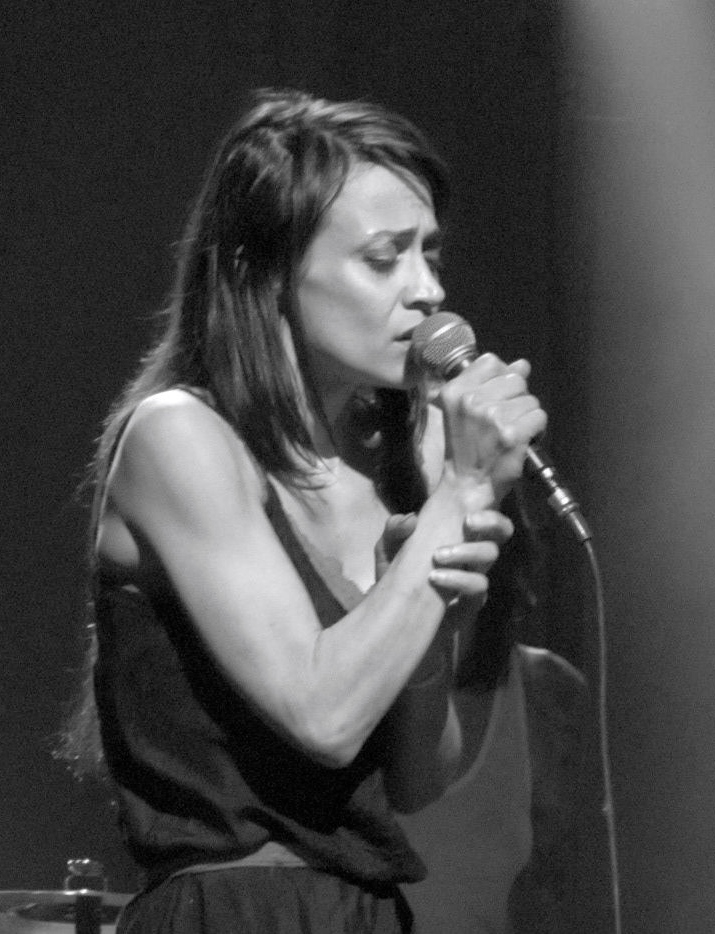
Fiona Apple, 2012

"Container" was written and performed mostly a cappella by Apple, and produced by Mills. The previously unreleased song was used for the opening sequence of The Affair; the television series' plot reportedly inspired the song. It describes "a woman who died, screaming into a canyon, and how the sound created an avalanche that killed a man, whose widow ultimately 'met your daddy and they made you'". According to Rolling Stone, "Apple sings that all she can do from there is to 'sink back into the ocean.'"

Sarah Treem, executive producer of The Affair, said of Apple and the song, "Fiona Apple has been my favorite songwriter since I was sixteen. I am honored and humbled that she has chosen to lend her talent to our opening title sequence. If our show can approach one tenth of the depth and complexity of her song, I'll be very happy." Treem said the title sequence was constructed around Apple's song, revealing, "The idea that actions have 'echoes' or unforeseen consequences became crucial to both of us."

== Reception ==
Entertainment Weekly described the song as "beautiful" and "unsettling". Rolling Stone called it "sparse and haunting".
