= Get Him Back =

Single by Fiona Apple

from the album Extraordinary Machine
- Released: February 6, 2006 (U.S.)
- Recorded: 2004–2005
- Studio: Phantom Studios, LA and Stanley Studios, Venice, CA
- Length: 5:26
- Label: Epic
- Songwriter: Fiona Apple
- Producers: Mike Elizondo; Brian Kehew

Fiona Apple singles chronology
"Not About Love" (2006)	"Get Him Back" (2006)	"Every Single Night" (2012)

"Get Him Back" is a song written by American singer Fiona Apple and produced by Mike Elizondo and Brian Kehew for her third album Extraordinary Machine (2005). It was released as a promotional CD single only to triple-A radio as the album's fourth single on February 6, 2006 (see 2006 in music).

In 2003, Extraordinary Machine, which was originally produced by Jon Brion, was submitted to Sony Music executives, who were reportedly unenthusiastic about the finished product and shelved it. On February 26, 2005, radio DJ Andrew Harms at 107.7 The End in Seattle began playing previously unheard tracks from a bootleg copy of Extraordinary Machine, and before long, poor quality copies of "Not about Love", "Get Him Back" and "Used to Love Him" were circulating on the internet. Soon after, CD-quality versions of all the tracks were released through the BitTorrent website TorrentBox. An extensively reworked version of Extraordinary Machine, co-produced by Mike Elizondo and Brian Kehew, was released in October 2005.

The Chicago Tribune published a track-by-track comparison of the leaked and official versions of the album, and wrote of "Get Him Back": "Brion's drum fills are more pronounced and strings underscore the vocals, while the Roots' Ahmir Thompson gives the Elizondo-Kehew version a more linear groove." Blender magazine ranked the official version of the song at number thirty-five on its list of "The 100 Greatest Songs of 2005".

== Formats & track listing ==
Acetate promo CD single:
1. Get Him Back (Radio Edit)
2. Get Him Back (Album Version)

== Personnel ==
- Piano by Fiona Apple
- Drums by Ahmir "Questlove" Thompson
- Moog bass by Mike Elizondo
- Keyboards by Keefus Ciancia
