= Parting Gift =

Single by Fiona Apple

from the album Extraordinary Machine
- Released: August 16, 2005 (U.S.)
- Studio: Phantom Studios, LA and Stanley Studios, Venice, CA
- Length: 3:34
- Label: Epic
- Songwriters: Fiona Apple (lyricist and composer)
- Producers: Mike Elizondo; Brian Kehew

Fiona Apple singles chronology
"O' Sailor" (2005)	"Parting Gift" (2005)	"Not About Love" (2006)

Music video
- "Parting Gift" on YouTube

"Parting Gift" is a song written by American singer Fiona Apple and recorded for her third studio album Extraordinary Machine (2005). It was produced by Mike Elizondo and Brian Kehew and is the only song from Extraordinary Machine not to have been originally recorded during the Jon Brion-produced sessions. Apple was able to record it on her first take. MTV News described the song as "a characteristically bitter breakup song", and its protagonist chastises a former beau (calling him a "silly, stupid pastime") whilst lamenting their failed relationship: "It ended bad but I loved what we started".

On August 15, 2005 (see 2005 in music), ahead of the album's release in early October, Epic Records made available for streaming both "Parting Gift" and "O' Sailor" on Apple's official website. The following day, the songs were released for digital download at the online iTunes Music Store. The music video for "Parting Gift" was directed by Spencer Maggart (Apple's brother), and it premiered on LAUNCHcast on August 23, 2005.

== Formats and track listing ==
US Acetate promo CD single:
1. Parting Gift (3:34)
