= Hopes & Dreams: The Lullaby Project =

Compilation album by various artists
- Released: 2018
- Label: Decca Gold

Hopes & Dreams: The Lullaby Project is a 2018 compilation album by various artists, released by the record label Decca Gold.

== Track listing ==
1. "Wildest Dreams" (Sarah Elizabeth Charles / Dariys Medina), performed by Janice Freeman - 2:43
2. "Hey Baby Boy" (Thomas Cabaniss), performed by Natalie Merchant - 3:42
3. "My Baby Likes Bacon" (John Chin / Emily Eagen / Tammy Harvey), performed by Rhiannon Giddens - 2:45
4. "Noah" (Glen Roven), performed by Catherine Zeta-Jones - 3:15
5. "Winter in My Heart" (Emily Eagen), performed by Rosanne Cash - 2:02
6. "Peace" (Tamilles Fernandes / Deidre Struck), performed by Joyce DiDonato - 3:21
7. "Mi Niña Bella" (Nina Andrea / Claudette Sierra), performed by Gilberto Santa Rosa - 2:38
8. "Sweet Dreams (Close Your Eyes)" (Thomas Cabaniss / Jessica Marmolejos), performed by Patti LuPone - 3:03
9. "Mansell's Waltz" (Emily Eagen / Virginia Rodriguez), performed by Rhiannon Giddens - 2:51
10. "Mother's Day" (Kesha Hyman / James Shipp), performed by Pretty Yende- 3:56
11. "Esso, Esso" (Emily Eagen / Odette N'dah), performed by Angélique Kidjo - 3:12
12. "I Can't Wait to Meet You" (Thomas Cabaniss / Solangie Jimenez), performed by Fiona Apple - 1:55
13. "The Moment You Were Born" (Frederic Las Fargeas / Amado Zubidi), performed by Dianne Reeves - 2:50
14. "Hopes & Dreams" (Matt Aronoff / Elsa Negron / James Shipp), performed by Joyce DiDonato & Brentano String Quartet - 3:20
15. "Dream Big" (Thomas Cabaniss / Shaylor Johnson), performed by Lawrence Brownlee - 2:55

Track listing adapted from AllMusic and the iTunes Store
