= The Idler Wheel... =

Studio album by Fiona Apple
- Released: June 19, 2012
- Recorded: 2008–2011
- Studios: Stanley (Los Feliz, California); NBB (New York City)
- Genres: Art pop; experimental rock
- Length: 42:39
- Labels: Epic; Clean Slate
- Producers: Fiona Apple; Charley Drayton (Note: Credited as "Feedy" and "Seedy" respectively)

Fiona Apple chronology
iTunes Originals – Fiona Apple (2006)	The Idler Wheel... (2012)	Fetch the Bolt Cutters (2020)

Singles from The Idler Wheel...
- 1. "Every Single Night" Released: April 24, 2012

The Idler Wheel... (Note: Full title The Idler Wheel Is Wiser Than the Driver of the Screw and Whipping Cords Will Serve You More Than Ropes Will Ever Do) is the fourth studio album by American singer-songwriter Fiona Apple. Like her second album, When the Pawn..., its title derives from a poem written by Apple. It was released on June 19, 2012 by Epic Records.

The album received a nomination at the 2013 Grammy Awards for Best Alternative Album. The album received widespread acclaim from critics, and was frequently included in year and decade-end lists by several publications; in 2020, Rolling Stone placed the album at number 213 on its list of the 500 Greatest Albums of All Time. It was her highest debut in the US, reaching number 3 on the Billboard 200 with 72,000 copies sold in its first week.

== Background and release ==
Following the delays and controversy surrounding the release of Extraordinary Machine (2005), Apple began recording new material for her fourth studio album in secret, including from her label, Epic Records. When asked by BlackBook magazine when the recording sessions began, Apple remarked, "It must have started in 2008. Or 2009. I don't know! I have no idea. It's weird to think that there was 2008, 2009, 2010, 2011. Where've I been? What was I doing? What was that year about?" Apple elaborated,

It was very casual, and I wasn't fully admitting that I was making an album, I got to use the time in the studio to inspire me to finish other things rather than feel like I was finishing homework to hand in. It wasn't a lot of pressure. And the record company didn't know I was doing it, so nobody was looking over my shoulder.

Instead of her long-time collaborator Jon Brion, Apple opted to produce the album with her touring drummer, Charley Drayton. Executives at Epic found out that Apple had recorded an album in early 2012, when she presented it to them. The album was originally planned for release in 2011, but Apple delayed the release until her label found a new president in 2012, explaining that she "didn't want her work to be mishandled amid corporate disarray." During a secret concert in Los Angeles with Brion, Apple remarked, "I can't remember any of my new songs because they've been done for a fucking year." In January 2012, L.A. Reid announced through Twitter that new material from Apple would be released later in 2012.

== Promotion ==
Apple announced a small tour in early 2012 prompting speculation over a new album. Ahead of her first performance on the Idler Wheel Tour, the album and its title were announced. The tour marked Apple's first performances outside of Los Angeles in over five years. Apple kicked off the tour with two performances at the South by Southwest Festival where she debuted three new songs from The Idler Wheel....The album's first single, "Every Single Night", received positive reviews and was well received by fans and critics. She released a video for the track "Hot Knife" on July 24, 2013.

On June 19, 2012, the same day that The Idler Wheel... was released, Apple began an expansive North American tour to promote the album. The tour kicked off in Ithaca, New York, and finished on July 29 at the Hollywood Palladium. On June 24, Apple performed at the Sunday portion of New York City's Governors Ball Music Festival, which featured acts such as Modest Mouse, Explosions in the Sky and Beck, among others.

The music video for "Every Single Night" premiered on the Sundance Channel on June 10 and was directed by Joseph Cahill. On the same day, the entire album streamed online on NPR. On June 18, Apple made her first television appearance since 2006 on Late Night with Jimmy Fallon. Apple performed "Anything We Want" with the Roots and celebrated Paul McCartney's 70th birthday by performing "Let Me Roll It" with Jimmy Fallon performing back-up vocals.

A video was also made for the song "Hot Knife" directed by Apple's ex-boyfriend Paul Thomas Anderson. Due to shooting conflicts with Anderson's 2012 film The Master, it was not edited and released until July 24, 2013, over a year after the album release and 6 months after the tour finished. "Hot Knife" was never released as a single.

== Critical reception ==
Professional ratings
Aggregate scores
Source	Rating
AnyDecentMusic?	8.5/10
Metacritic	89/100
Review scores
Source	Rating
AllMusic	5/5 stars
The A.V. Club	A
The Guardian	4/5 stars
Los Angeles Times	4/4 stars
MSN Music (Expert Witness)	A−
NME	8/10
Pitchfork	9.0/10
PopMatters	6/10
Rolling Stone	3.5/5 stars
Spin	8/10

The Idler Wheel... received widespread critical acclaim by contemporary music critics. At Metacritic, which assigns a normalized rating out of 100 to reviews from mainstream critics, the album received an average score of 89, based on 35 reviews, which indicates "universal acclaim".

Stephen Thomas Erlewine of AllMusic awarded the album five stars out of five, praising Apple's "magnetic vocals, the human element pulling us into these songs", adding that while the album has similarities to her previous three, it is "stripped of all her carnivalesque accouterments" and there is a new "unwavering determination and cohesion". BBC Music reviewer James Skinner praised the "hopelessly romantic" album and Apple's "expressive" vocals, and considered the album to be her "sparsest work to date". Blair Kelly of musicOMH said the album is "both roaring with rage and swooning with romance", finding it refreshingly "spare" while its focus is on Apple's "raw, rough and flawed" vocals. American Songwriter writer Jim Beviglia rated the album four stars out of five, praising its "stark and raw" songs, its "visceral power" and Apple's presentation of "the mixed emotions that accompany the fallout of a broken relationship".

Robert Christgau gave the album an A−, calling it "damn catchy", with "few arpeggios, and not much tone color and such", and while Apple "executes simple figures and hammers thick chords, including a few boogie-woogies just to make a point", the album is "mood music". Melissa Maerz of Entertainment Weekly gave the album an A, and regarded it as "highly confessional and creative and temperamental", concluding it "isn't easy listening. But it's worth it." Ryan Dombal of Pitchfork scored the album nine out of ten and called it "the most distilled Fiona Apple album yet", commending its "raw emotion". Consequence of Sound called the album "one of the most daring pop records in recent history", awarding it with four-and-a-half stars out of five. Greg Kot of Chicago Tribune gave it three-and-a-half stars out of four, deeming it "more stripped down and turbulent than before", adding that "It makes for a raw, unsettling listen, tempered by shots of dark humor." NME wrote: "The tension created by the lyrics and music is wonderful and uneasy, ensuring that The Idler Wheel... is endlessly fascinating and unlike anything else you're likely to hear this year."

Jessica Hopper of Spin rated the album eight out of ten, writing that it "relentlessly reassures us that she’s the same old Fiona, still wilding and Weill-ing out" and "the unexpected triumph lies not in the spectacle of the singer raw-dogging her emotions, but in her total command of the anarchy that results". Slant Magazine gave it four stars out of five and called the album "her most dense and ambitious" while it remains "accessible". Genevieve Koski of The A.V. Club graded the album an A and said: "The beauty of The Idler Wheel... is how it transmits each of those feelings in excruciating, frank, and lovely detail." Jillian Mapes of Billboard wrote that although the album is "devoid of much musical flourishing", it was "absolutely worth the seven-year wait". The Boston Phoenix's Zeth Lundy rated the album three-and-a-half stars out of four, describing its sound as "raw and deceptively artless" and deeming it "arguably her funniest ... but also her leanest and most melodically daring." Paste magazine reviewer Stephen M. Deusner rated it 8.4 out of 10, stating that Apple relies on the same eccentricities of her past work, and her inability to "get out of her own head — can’t even begin to write a song that doesn’t build on layers of self-conscious self-absorption and gritty self-loathing — may in fact be one of her greatest and most distinguishing strengths as an artist"; while her "overwrought" lyrics "can provoke cringes as easily as sympathetic nods", they "exert a considerable power, marking these songs as indelibly her own". Now magazine gave the album four out of five stars, writing: "Apple's return to music is not only undeniably powerful, but Idler is arguably her best work yet."

PopMatters' Enio Chiola rated the album six out of ten, finding it "purposefully and inauthentically difficult for the sake of being difficult", criticizing the "twist[ing] [of] simple arrangements and sentiments into an unnecessarily uneasy listen...[resulting] in the record being often times tiresome and boring" and Apple's "tendency to scream". "There simply isn't enough variation" on the album, Chiola concluded, but it "isn't necessarily (even at its core) a bad record." Rolling Stone gave the album three-and-a-half out of five stars, writing that the album is "rawboned emotionally" while Apple "pours out her distress on driving songs with lyrics that mix romantic poetry and therapy-speak – Byron by way of Oprah", and although the songs may "drag", her "kooky energy pushes through the slow spots."

=== Awards and year-end lists ===
The album received a nomination at the 55th Grammy Awards for Best Alternative Album. It was named the best album of 2012 by Time, Stereogum, Spinner, and NPR Music's Fresh Air. It ranked at number 2 on the lists of Consequence of Sound and Entertainment Weekly, number 3 on the lists of USA Today and Pitchfork, number 4 on Paste, number 5 in Rolling Stone, number 10 on Idolator, number sixteen in Spin, number seventeen on American Songwriter and Filter, and appeared on NPR's unnumbered list. The album was ranked No. 10 in Pitchfork's list of The 100 Best Albums of the Decade So Far (2010-2014), published in August 2014.

Apple's track "Hot Knife" ranked at number twelve in Rolling Stone’s 50 Best Songs of 2012 list and "Every Single Night" ranked at number 7 on American Songwriter's Top 50 Songs of 2012. In Pitchfork's Top 100 Tracks of 2012, "Werewolf" was ranked at number 9 and "Every Single Night" was ranked at number 35.

In 2019, the album was included on The Guardian's 100 Best Albums of the 21st Century list, and ranked 5th on Pitchfork's list of The 200 Best Albums of the 2010s. In 2020, Rolling Stone placed the album at number 213 on its list of The 500 Greatest Albums of All Time.

== Track listing ==
All tracks are written by Fiona Apple.

The Idler Wheel…
No.	Title	Length
1.	"Every Single Night"	3:29
2.	"Daredevil"	3:28
3.	"Valentine"	3:32
4.	"Jonathan"	5:03
5.	"Left Alone"	4:50
6.	"Werewolf"	3:12
7.	"Periphery"	4:58
8.	"Regret"	5:17
9.	"Anything We Want"	4:40
10.	"Hot Knife"	4:02
Total length:		42:39

Bonus track (digital editions)
No.	Title	Length
11.	"Largo"	2:41
Total length:		45:20

Deluxe edition bonus DVD (filmed at SXSW, March 14, 2012)
No.	Title	Length
1.	"Every Single Night"	3:19
2.	"Anything We Want"	5:00
3.	"Fast as You Can"	5:15
4.	"A Mistake"	5:53
5.	"Sleep to Dream"	4:40
Total length:		24:07

== Personnel ==
Credits adapted from The Idler Wheel... album liner notes.

- Fiona Apple (credited as "Feedy") – field recording, loops, truck stomping, dance partner, thighs on "Daredevil", percussion, piano, celeste, timpani on "Hot Knife", voice strings, singing, artwork, bass keyboard, production
- Charley Drayton (credited as "Seedy") – kora, autoharp, truck stomping, dance partner, percussion, guitar, bouzouki, marimba, drum set, voice strings, thighs on "Daredevil", field recording, pillow, voice of pain, baritone vocals, string harp, Teisco guitar, production
- John Would – recording
- Eddison Sainsbury – recording
- Dave Way – mixing
- Howie Weinberg – mastering
- Dan Gerbarg – mastering
- Sebastian Steinberg – acoustic bass, Harmony guitar
- Maude Maggart – high harmony on "Hot Knife"
- Eric Roinestad – art direction, design
- Andrew Slater – management

== Charts ==
=== Weekly charts ===
Chart (2012)	Peak position
Australian Albums Chart	23
Austrian Albums Chart	44
Belgian Albums Chart (Flanders)	116
Belgian Albums Chart (Wallonia)	149
Canadian Albums Chart	13
Dutch Albums Chart	62
French Albums Chart	54
German Albums Chart	56
Irish Albums Chart	78
Italian Albums Chart	61
Japanese Albums Chart	68
Mexican Albums Chart	91
New Zealand Albums Chart	30
Portuguese Albums Chart	20
Scottish Albums (Official Charts)	90
Spanish Albums Chart	100
Swiss Albums Chart	28
UK Albums Chart	68
US Billboard 200	3
US Alternative Albums	1
US Rock Albums	1

=== Year-end charts ===
Chart (2012)	Position
US Billboard 200	157
US Alternative Albums	28
US Rock Albums	48

== Certifications and sales ==
Region	Certification	Certified units/sales
United States	—	205,000
