= Fetch the Bolt Cutters =

Studio album by Fiona Apple
- Released: April 17, 2020
- Recorded: July 2015 – March 2020
- Studios: Apple's house (Los Angeles); Stanley (Los Angeles); Sonic Ranch (Tornillo, Texas); Waystation (Los Angeles)
- Genres: Art pop; bedroom pop
- Length: 51:49
- Labels: Epic; Clean Slate
- Producers: Fiona Apple; Amy Aileen Wood; Sebastian Steinberg; Davíd Garza (Note: The album is credited as produced by Apple and Wood with Steinberg and Garza.)

Fiona Apple chronology
The Idler Wheel... (2012)	Fetch the Bolt Cutters (2020)

Singles from Fetch the Bolt Cutters
- 1. "Shameika" Released: April 27, 2020

Fetch the Bolt Cutters is the fifth studio album by American singer-songwriter Fiona Apple. It was released on April 17, 2020, Apple's first release since The Idler Wheel... in 2012.

The album was recorded from 2015 to 2020, largely at Apple's home in Venice, Los Angeles. It was produced and performed by Apple alongside percussionist Amy Aileen Wood, bassist Sebastian Steinberg, and multi-instrumentalist Davíd Garza. GarageBand was used for much of this recording, and Fiona Apple attributes the album's unedited vocals and long takes to her lack of expertise with the program.

Rooted in experimentation, the album is dominated by unconventional percussion including the use of found objects not originally intended as instruments. Apple described the result as "percussion orchestras". These industrial-like rhythms are contrasted against traditional melodies and some conventional instruments such as piano, and the upbeat songs often subvert traditional pop structures.

The album explores freedom from oppression; Apple identified its core message as: "Fetch the fucking bolt cutters and get yourself out of the situation you're in". The title, a quote from TV series The Fall, reflects this idea. The album also discusses Apple's complex relationships with other women and other personal experiences, including bullying and sexual assault. It has nevertheless been referred to as Apple's most humorous album.

Fetch the Bolt Cutters was released during the first year of the COVID-19 pandemic, and many critics found its exploration of confinement timely. It received widespread acclaim from music critics, who described it as an instant classic, revolutionary, and Apple's best work to-date. The album was awarded Best Alternative Music Album at the 63rd Annual Grammy Awards, with "Shameika" winning Best Rock Performance. The album debuted at number four on the US Billboard 200; and number one on the US Top Album Sales, Top Alternative Albums, and Top Rock Albums, with 44,000 equivalent album units. It was her first album to peak at number one on an all-genre US album chart. It also charted in the top 15 in Canada, Australia and New Zealand.

== Background and recording ==
In 2012, after releasing The Idler Wheel..., Apple began conceptualizing a new album, considering a concept album based on her home in Venice Beach or the Pando tree cluster in Utah which is the largest known organism.

In February 2015, she began rehearsals for the album with band members Sebastian Steinberg, Amy Aileen Wood and Davíd Garza. They began writing and rehearsing in Apple's Venice Beach home studio, using home-made percussive objects and chanting as they marched around the house.

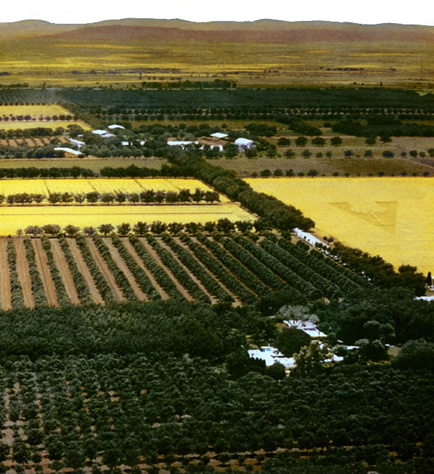
Early sessions for the album took place at Sonic Ranch in Texas.

In July, they began recording the album, spending three weeks at the Sonic Ranch studio in rural Texas, where they recorded most of "Relay", "Ladies", "Cosmonauts" and "On I Go". Apple recalled that these sessions were often unproductive, with the band being distracted by magic mushrooms and films. They returned to Los Angeles, working on the material at Stanley Recordings. Apple decided that recording should relocate to her Venice Beach home studio, where they soon returned. She likened her house to "the womb of where I've developed into an adult", so she chose to record the album at home to "repay" the house. She elaborated on the house's presence in the album: "I really felt like it's an instrument in itself, it's the microphone: The house is the microphone, the house is the ambiance, the house is a member of the band". Further sessions for "Newspaper" and "Heavy Balloon" took place at engineer Dave Way's private studio, Waystation.

They recorded long takes consisting of instruments being hit against surfaces and objects; her vocals were unedited, and the album developed a highly percussive sound. The sessions at Apple's home were largely recorded with GarageBand. On the long, unedited takes, Apple commented: "I didn't even know how to edit it and make a take shorter, so each track is just this one long take, and if I made a mistake in it, well, I better just play over it and let that mistake work itself into it". This resulted in what Apple described as "percussion orchestras", especially on "Newspaper" and the title track.

By July 2019, Apple had begun mixing the album. In September, the process began to slow down, with Apple developing doubts about the album. At this time, the artist first mentioned work on her new project in an interview with Vulture, explaining that she was still working hard on her next album which should have been released "a million years ago" and was hoping to put it out in 2020. She also admitted to being reclusive due to ongoing recording sessions at her Venice Beach house.

In January 2020, she played the mixes to her band members, whose positive responses brought Apple back on track. In an interview that month, she said that the album process was in its final stages, with the only things left being "artwork and stuff". In March, she announced that she had finished recording.

== Music and lyrics ==
Fetch the Bolt Cutters' sound is defined by percussion. The piano-playing typical to Apple's work is still evident, but takes a more percussive form. As well as drum sets and traditional percussion, the album features the use of found objects as percussion, such as a metal butterfly and the bones of Apple's deceased dog Janet. The experimental rhythms on the album evoke industrial music and are juxtaposed against more traditional melodies. Stereogum's Tom Breihan argues that while percussive music is typically "built around the idea of dancing, of guiding and channeling the rhythms of the human body", the album instead "plays as a wild, feverish attempt to mirror the chaos that goes on in the human mind when it's at its most overheated". Apple has attributed the album's prominent use of percussion to a childhood habit, developed as a part of her obsessive-compulsive disorder, in which she would always walk rhythmically to a strict tempo.

The album has been described as an art pop record, and "the most sophisticated possible version" of bedroom pop. It has been noted for its experimental approach to pop music. Critics have noted its ambition and originality. Nevertheless, it has been compared to the works of Joni Mitchell, Tom Waits, Nina Simone, and Kate Bush, who is quoted on the title track. The album often rejects popular music's traditional verse-chorus structure. The unpredictable songs feature looped sections, sudden stops and tempo changes. It has been noted as less melancholy than Apple's past work, with the uptempo songs being described as "funny, angry, and at times triumphant". The album features frequent improvisation, as well as background noise such as the barking of dogs, largely as a result of its home recording.

On the album, Apple approached her voice as a musical instrument, commenting: "I have fun with my voice, but I'm not trying to make it pretty all the time. I'm not trying to convince anybody I'm a singer. It just turned out to be another instrument". Breihan noted that Apple demonstrates "a rapper's sense that words can be music", while The Guardian's Laura Barton highlighted the intimacy of Apple's vocals: "half-conversational, half-self-mutters, allowing every scuff, breath and feral yelp". Jon Pareles of The New York Times found that "whether she's cooing with sarcastic solicitousness or rasping close to a scream, she articulates every word clearly, emoting but never losing control".

Lyrically, Apple identified the album's main theme as "not being afraid to speak", with Barton similarly recognizing "a refusal to be silenced". Apple later said that this was an oversimplification, elaborating that "it's about breaking out of whatever prison you've allowed yourself to live in", and pinpointing the message as: "Fetch the fucking bolt cutters and get yourself out of the situation you're in". She has said that writing the album helped free her of the ideas she had of herself, explaining that "this whole album, for me, has turned into the headache that I had inside of my head and now that it's released, it's like this pulse that now we can all share". Pareles found that the album explored "both past and present injuries: bullying, sexual assault, destructive mind games, romantic debacles, [Apple's] own fears and compulsions and the people who have taken advantage of them". The album explores freedom, with Breihan writing that "we can hear the euphoria of a great unburdening". The album has also been identified as Apple's most humorous album.

Another theme Apple explores on the album are her complex social relationships with other women. Apple commented that these relationships began to suffer in middle school, and the album features Apple trying to make peace with "the sorts of women that society has always deemed her 'competition'", such as subsequent girlfriends of her exes. Apple summarized this idea as "not letting men pit us against each other or keep us separate from each other so they can control the message".

== Songs ==
The opening track, "I Want You to Love Me", was initially addressed to a hypothetical lover, but was eventually influenced by Apple's relationship with writer Jonathan Ames, as well as by a period of meditation in 2010–11, at Spirit Rock Meditation Center, Woodacre, California. The latter experience is explored in the line "And I know when I go all my particles disband and disperse / and I'll be back in the pulse", which explores a breakthrough she achieved following a throbbing headache, where she witnessed "a pulsing space between the people at the retreat—a suggestion of something larger". "Shameika" is named after a girl who attended middle school with Apple. The song is based on an experience Apple recalled when she was rejected by a group of popular girls, after which "Shameika came up, and she was like, 'Why are you trying to sit with those girls? You have potential.'" The line, "Sebastian said I'm a good man in a storm", was inspired by an incident in Marfa, Texas where the band were almost arrested for cannabis possession. Bassist Sebastian Steinberg made the comment to Apple in response to how she handled the event.

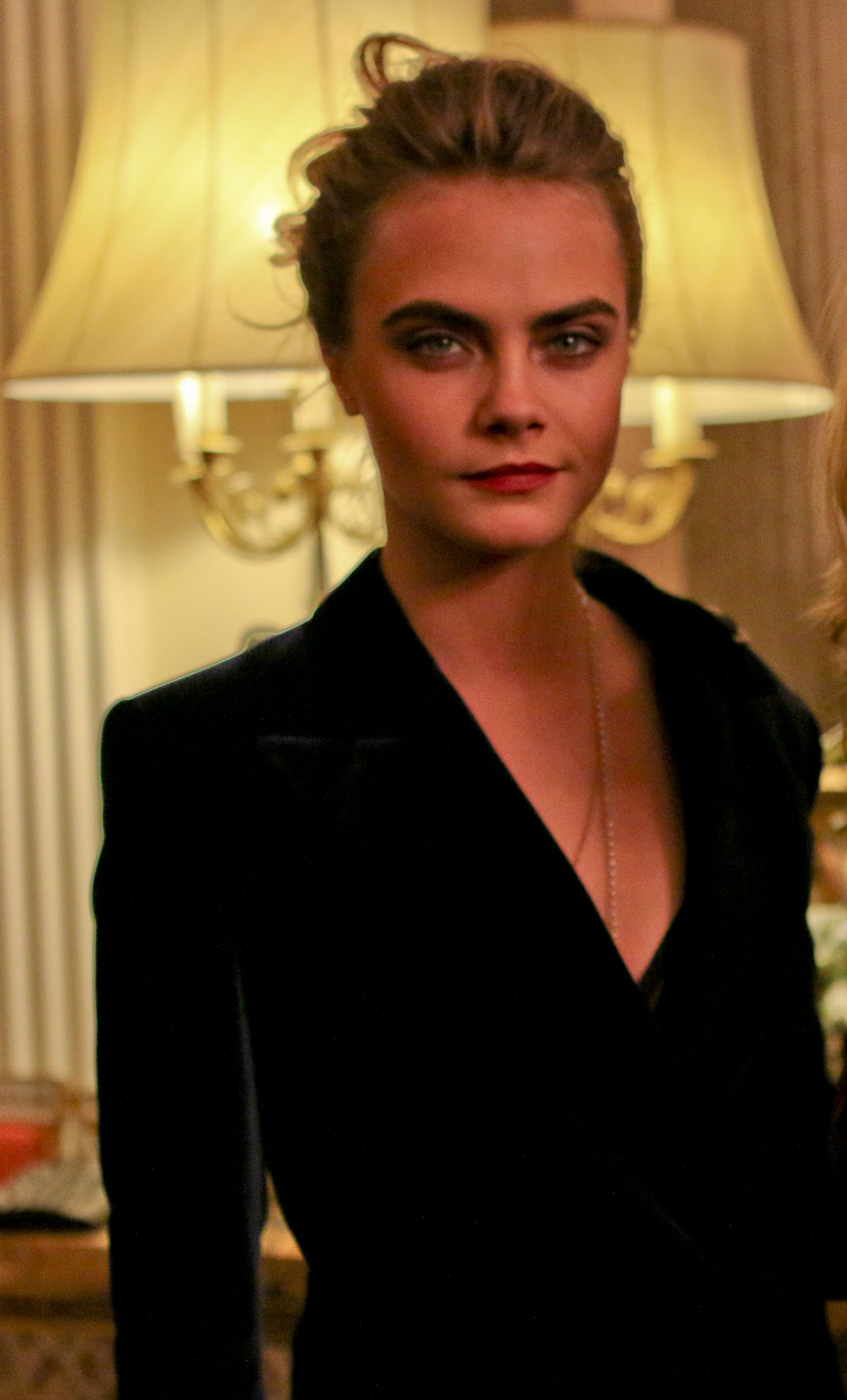
Cara Delevingne contributes backing vocals to the album's title track.

The title track was one of the last songs recorded for the album, and came after the album already had its title. English model and actress Cara Delevingne provides background vocals; Apple chose Delevingne in part because her English accent matched that of Gillian Anderson's character in The Fall, from whom the title is quoted. The sound of barking dogs which appears at the end of the song comes from Apple's dog Mercy, Delevingne's dogs Leo and Alfie, and Zelda Hallman's dog Maddie. The track quotes Kate Bush's 1985 single "Running Up That Hill". The humorous "Under the Table" describes an antagonistic dinner party. Apple has said that it was informed by an expensive dinner she attended with "lots of bragging about things I wouldn't brag about". She continued that following an offensive comment made by one of the guests, "I called the guy out. And may have messed the dinner up a little bit. But I was right". She later added that one of the guests at the dinner was "a prominent figure of a streaming service". "Relay" features the line, "Evil is a relay sport, when the one who's burned turns to pass the torch", which Apple first wrote when she was aged 15. Apple explores her own resentments, some of which she has characterized as "funny" or "petty", including social media influencers in the line "I resent you presenting your life like a fucking propaganda brochure". The track is musically influenced by both cheerleading chants and R&B.

Apple wrote "Rack of His" over a 10-year period; it was inspired by two different relationships she was in. The title was inspired by band member Davíd Garza saying: "Oh, I did terrible things to that rack of his". "Newspaper" was also inspired by two different relationships. According to Maura Johnston of The Boston Globe, the song "shines a harsh spotlight on the way women are casually and cruelly pitted against each other in the game of love". For The New York Times, Jon Pareles wrote that the song's narrator "identifies with her ex's new girlfriend as she sees – and now recognizes – the way he undercuts her". The song features backing vocals from Apple's sister, cabaret singer Maude Maggart, who recorded her vocals while breast feeding. Apple has said that the track's title is arbitrary, and she could not recall its origin. "Ladies" also explores the idea of "not letting men pit [women] against each other", exploring the relationships between different ex-lovers of the same man. On the track, Apple repeats the word "ladies" in various different styles. She commented: "I like the word ladies, and then it just got to be really fun to say it in different ways ... Like, 'Ladies, we better get into it,' and like, 'Ladies are so nice.'" The line "I'm a fruit bat" refers to the use of the word "bats" to mean mad, with Apple using the term as an affectionate way of referring to herself.

"Heavy Balloon" explores depression, and "the way that depressed people can start to treat their depression like a friend or a plaything". Apple commented: "It's almost like you get Stockholm syndrome with your own depression—like you're kidnapped by your own depression". The second verse, including the line "The bottom begins to feel like the only safe place that you know", was partially inspired by an episode of television series The Affair. The line "I spread like strawberries, I climb like peas and beans" was inspired by a children's gardening book, referencing the fact that strawberry plants tend to spread horizontally through soil and legumes can grow vertically. Wesley Morris of The New York Times found the track musically reminscient of Apple's debut album Tidal (1996), while Jon Caramanica of the same publication found that this applied to "Cosmonauts". The latter track was originally recorded with long-time collaborator Jon Brion for the 2012 comedy film This Is 40, for which Brion composed the score. The track was not used in the film, although Apple's "Dull Tool" did appear. Director Judd Apatow wanted the track to explore the idea of a life-long romantic relationship, which challenged Apple, who did not "know if [she] want[ed] to be together with anybody forever". Because of this, Apple said: "I interpreted it as like, 'It's going to be you and me in this little vessel by ourselves in space, except it's going to weigh a lot more, and you're going to really get on my nerves.'"

Apple is the only musician credited on "For Her", which has been described as "cathartic", and "one of the album's most arresting songs". The track's depiction of a man's abuse of a woman is based, with permission, on the stories told to Apple by a friend who worked as an intern at a film production company. The song addresses the man on behalf of the friend, in Apple's words, "to, in a roundabout way, tell her story that she's not able to tell". The song also draws on Apple's own experiences, with her commenting: "It started out me wanting to write something about my own feelings, but it was just too hard. I wanted to make it about not just me but about other people". The song, especially the lines "Good mornin'! Good mornin' / You raped me in the same bed your daughter was born in", was partly written in response to the nomination of Associate Justice of the Supreme Court Brett Kavanaugh, despite allegations of sexual misconduct against him. Musically, the track has three sections. It begins as "a kind of playground chant", and then a "rebuking tribal cheer", before "it shape-shifts into a fever dream, the backing vocals eventually settling into an abstracted wail".

"Drumset" was written in the period following Apple's break-up with Ames. Apple had a minor argument with her band, after which drummer Amy Aileen Wood removed her drumset for a live performance. Apple said she mis-interpreted this "as that they were pissed at me and that they weren't going to come back", at which point she improvised the lyrics to the song: "The drumset is gone, and the rug it was on is still here, screaming at me". The band later recorded the song in a single take. Apple has called closing track "On I Go" a "vipassanā chant" which she originally sang while imprisoned following a 2012 arrest for hash possession. She has said that the song explores how "there doesn't have to be any specific meaning or reward or consequence of the things I'm doing". Caramanica highlighted a "fascinating, circular pattern in the vocal rhythms; incisive and destabilizing percussion; plenty of empty space that leaves room for shock", comparing the effect to the lyrical experimentation of independent hip hop in the late 1990s.

== Release ==
On March 16, 2020, Apple announced the album and its title in an extensive New Yorker profile. At the start of April, she announced that the album was set to be released digitally on April 17. Epic Records had planned to release the album in October, due to promotional limitations brought by the coronavirus pandemic. However, Apple pushed to release the album early, both for the benefit of listeners who were under self-isolation, and so she could avoid stressful press commitments. Apple's friend King Princess also encouraged the early release. Critics have commented on the timeliness of releasing the album during the pandemic, finding thematic relevance in its exploration of confinement, and comparing Apple's reclusiveness to the widespread self-isolation restrictions.

No singles were issued from the album prior to its release, but "Shameika" was released to adult alternative radio on April 27 as the album's lead single. On November 20, a music video was released for the track, directed by Matthias Brown. The video features the voice of Shameika Stepney, the song's namesake, who reunited with Apple following the album's release. On the same day, Stepney released "Shameika Said", featuring vocals from Apple and samples of "Shameika".

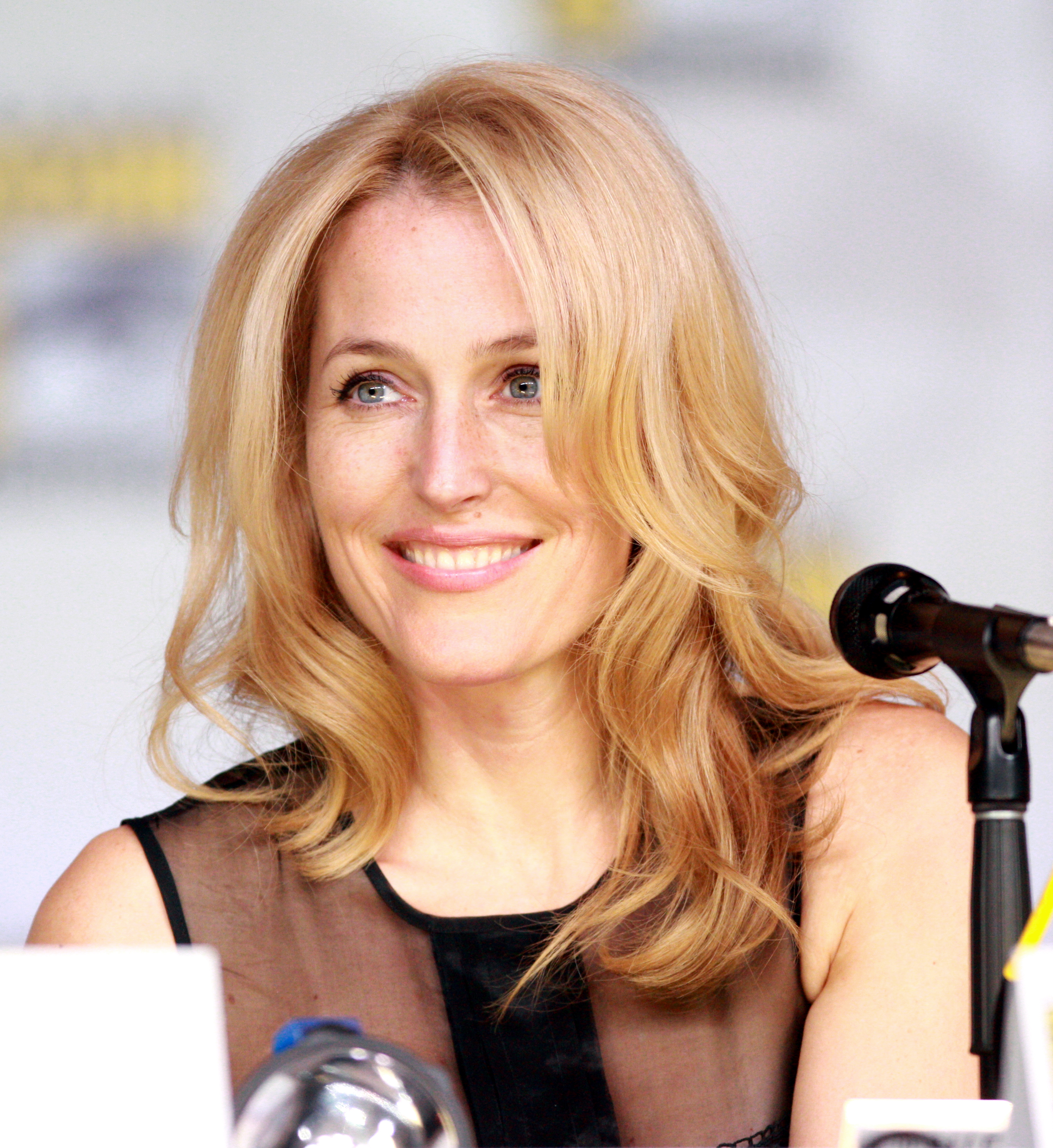
The album's title is quoted from Gillian Anderson's character in The Fall.

=== Title ===
The title, Fetch the Bolt Cutters, is a quote from the British-Irish crime drama television series The Fall, where the protagonist, a sex-crimes investigator portrayed by Gillian Anderson, recites the phrase while investigating a crime scene where a woman was tortured. Upon the album's release, Anderson acknowledged the title by sharing an animated GIF of the scene via Twitter. The quote reflects the album's exploration of becoming free, with Apple summarizing the title's message as "Fetch your tool of liberation. Set yourself free".

=== Artwork ===
The album's artwork was designed by band member Davíd Garza, following the decision to release the album early. Apple sent him a photo she had taken of herself "two or three" years earlier, and saved as a potential cover photo. On the choice of photograph, she commented: "That face is very much me. I just wanted to be like, 'Hey, guess what? I'm back! Here are some songs. Want to listen to the music, huh? Hi, hi, hi, hi.'"

The album's back cover notes that the album was "made on unceded Tongva, Mescalero Apache, and Suma territories". Apple worked with activist Eryn Wise of Seeding Sovereignty, commenting "It's a way for me to also make a life commitment to be listening and to be able to be a friend in whatever best way I can".

== Reception ==
=== Critical response ===
Professional ratings
Aggregate scores
Source	Rating
AnyDecentMusic?	9.2/10
Metacritic	98/100
Review scores
Source	Rating
AllMusic	4.5/5 stars
And It Don't Stop	A
The A.V. Club	A
The Daily Telegraph	5/5 stars
The Guardian	5/5 stars
The Independent	5/5 stars
NME	4/5 stars
Pitchfork	10/10
Rolling Stone	4.5/5 stars
The Times	5/5 stars

Fetch the Bolt Cutters received widespread acclaim. At review aggregator Metacritic, the release received a weighted average score of 98 out of 100, based on 28 reviews, making it the second-highest rated album in the website's history. (Note: Metacritic's ranking of top-scoring album releases excludes EPs, live albums, box sets, reissues, compilations and albums with less than seven reviews.) It is also the second-highest rated album on AnyDecentMusic?, with an average rating of 9.2/10, from 25 critics' assessments. According to Tom Hull, it was the "best regarded/most hyped album of the year".

The album was awarded Pitchfork's first perfect score for a new album since Kanye West's My Beautiful Dark Twisted Fantasy in 2010, with Jenn Pelly describing the album as, "unbound, a wild symphony of the everyday, an unyielding masterpiece. No music has ever sounded quite like it." Stephen Thomas Erlewine of AllMusic wrote that "It's rare to listen to a pop album and have no idea what comes next, and Fetch the Bolt Cutters delivers surprises that delight and bruise at a rapid pace". He concluded, "The unpredictable nature feels complex and profoundly human, resulting in an album that's nourishing and joyfully cathartic". For Rolling Stone, Claire Shaffer named it Apple's best album, writing "Apple has never sounded more sure of herself, and that alone is cause for celebration". Critic Robert Christgau lauded Fiona Apple's virtuosic musicianship and assigned the album an A rating, "The music grows on you before you realize it because it's not hooky in a hummy kind of way. Instead it's [beat driven], clattering like nothing I can recall and hence hard to recall itself—you have to refer back to the record. There the bite and elan of her latest love-don't-last songs will win over anyone".

Maura Johnston of The Boston Globe applauded the album for its "matter-of-fact depictions of everyday brutality", and added that "even [during] the most intense moments of Fetch, her lyrics retain a playfulness that acts as a ballast." She also commended Apple's "husky alto", which "remains the focal point, launching into melodies that are instantly sticky as effortlessly as it engages in tensely rhythmic Sprechstimme." Mikael Wood of the Los Angeles Times wrote of the "stunning intimacy of the material here—a rich text to scour", adding "you'd need to go back to the later parts of Nina Simone's catalog to find another pop vocalist as eager as Apple is to make such a show of unprettiness." Time critic Judy Berman similarly praised the album for its "lyrics that scan as prose more often than poetry, [which] creates a rare intimacy", and commented that "As beautiful as the melodies and the epiphanies they carry often are, the songs are not what you would call 'pretty.' ... Yet Bolt Cutters wouldn't be the extraordinary experiment in aural and lyrical honesty that it is if it sounded too polished". Patrick Ryan of USA Today described the album as "a dense and richly poetic masterpiece from one of music's best modern storytellers" with "razor-sharp statements and evocative lyrics that reveal themselves in every new listen".

The Daily Telegraph's chief music critic Neil McCormick described it as "a masterpiece for the #MeToo era", writing that it "feels about as real as music can be". In a five-star review, Laura Barton from The Guardian commented on the album's "refusal to be silenced", writing: "The result is that this seems not so much an album as a sudden glorious eruption; after eight long years, an urgent desire to be heard". Kitty Empire of sister publication The Observer described the album as "a strange and exceptional record, even within the context of an uncommon career". Will Hodgkinson of The Times called it "a totally original, utterly compelling album", concluding: "This album is deep enough for multiple interpretations while being so authentic to its creator's vision, you want to unpeel its layers and reveal the core. It is like nothing else you will hear this year". For NME, Charlotte Krol wrote that the album "will cut straight to the gut for Apple fans old and new and leave behind indelible messages about her life and illustrious career, now spanning two decades. It's an intoxicating listen – and one of her best".

=== Year-end lists ===
Select year-end list appearances for Fetch the Bolt Cutters
Critic/Publication	List	Rank	Ref
Billboard	Top 50 Best Albums of 2020	7	
Consequence of Sound	Top 50 Albums of 2020	1	
Entertainment Weekly	The 15 best albums of 2020	1	
The Guardian	Top 50 best albums of 2020	1	
Los Angeles Times	Top 10 Albums of 2020	2	
The New York Times	Best Albums of 2020	1	
Pitchfork	The 50 Best Albums of 2020	1	
Rolling Stone	The 50 Best Albums of 2020	2	
Slate	Best Albums of 2020	9	
Time	The 10 Best Albums of 2020	3	

== Commercial performance ==
On the US Billboard 200, Fetch the Bolt Cutters debuted at number four with 44,000 equivalent album units, marking the singer's third consecutive top 10 album, and her second-highest-charting release; The Idler Wheel... reached number three in 2012. Of that sum, 30,000 are in album sales, 13,000 are in SEA units and less than 1,000 are in TEA units. It also debuted atop the Billboard charts for Top Album Sales, Top Alternative Albums, and Top Rock Albums. Outside of the US, the album reached the top ten in Canada, the top 15 in Australia and New Zealand, the top 40 in Germany, Ireland, Switzerland, Scotland, Denmark, the UK and the Flanders region of Belgium, and the top 100 in Austria, Italy and France. Once the physical copies of the album were released in July, the album re-entered the Billboard 200 at number 60. It also debuted at number one on the US Vinyl Album chart, making this her second consecutive album to achieve this.

The lead single "Shameika" peaked at number 19 on the Billboard Adult Alternative Songs chart in June 2020; it was Apple's first entry on the chart since "Fast as You Can" in January 2000, breaking the record for the longest time between entries on the chart. The album's first five tracks all appeared on the Billboard Hot Rock Songs chart, as her first ever entries on the chart.

== Grammys boycott ==
At the 63rd Annual Grammy Awards, Fetch the Bolt Cutters won the Grammy Award for Best Alternative Music Album, while "Shameika" won the Grammy Award for Best Rock Performance. However, Apple did not attend the ceremony. Three months earlier, in an interview with The Guardian, she stated that she had wished to have been able to celebrate with other nominees in the Best Rock Performance category which, for the first time in history, were all women. However, she changed her mind after the Recording Academy nominated Dr. Luke for his work on "Say So" in the Record of the Year category at the 63rd ceremony. Apple felt that the academy was hypocritical for that move after having invited Kesha to perform "Praying"—a song about the alleged sexual assault that Kesha had suffered at the hands of Luke—at the 60th ceremony. Apple went on to state that, in case of her victory, her vision was that "I would just get up there with a sledgehammer and I wouldn't say anything, I would take the Grammy and smash it into enough pieces to share and I would invite all the ladies up. My second thought was I wonder if I can get all these ladies to boycott this shit because of Dr. Luke."

== Track listing ==
All tracks are written by Fiona Apple, except "Ladies" (lyrics by Apple; music by Sebastian Steinberg, Davíd Garza).

No.	Title	Length
1.	"I Want You to Love Me"	3:56
2.	"Shameika"	4:08
3.	"Fetch the Bolt Cutters"	4:58
4.	"Under the Table"	3:20
5.	"Relay" (contains a sample from "My Kettle, My Cats" by Sebastian Steinberg)	4:50
6.	"Rack of His"	3:42
7.	"Newspaper"	5:32
8.	"Ladies"	5:25
9.	"Heavy Balloon"	3:26
10.	"Cosmonauts"	4:00
11.	"For Her"	2:43
12.	"Drumset"	2:40
13.	"On I Go"	3:09
Total length:		51:49

== Personnel ==
Credits are adapted from the album's liner notes.

Band

- Fiona Apple – vocals (all tracks), piano (1, 2, 4, 10), Casio drums (1), percussion (2–7, 9, 10, 13), claps (2), background vocals (2–5, 7–13), drums (3, 5–7, 9, 11, 13), Mellotron (3, 6, 12), metal butterfly (3), electronic drums (7), timpani (7), Wurlitzer (8), Casio (9), bells (9), chair (12)
- Sebastian Steinberg – bass (1–10, 12, 13), drums (1), percussion (2, 5, 9), claps (2), guitarrón (8), guitar (9), background vocals (9, 12), electric autoharp (10, 13), acoustic 12-string guitar (10), slide guitar (10), lighter on Wurlitzer (12), harp thing (12), stomps (13), breathing (13), water tower (13)
- Amy Aileen Wood – drums (1–10, 12, 13), percussion (2, 4, 5, 9, 10, 13), claps (2), loops (10), water tower (13)
- Davíd Garza – percussion (2, 5, 8, 9, 12, 13), claps (2), Mellotron (4, 8), guitar (5–7), vibes (8, 9), background vocals (8, 9, 12), electric guitar (10), Wurlitzer (10), piano (10), organ (12), water tower (13), artwork

Additional musicians

- Bobb Bruno – special effects (2, 5)
- Cara Delevingne – background vocals (3)
- Mercy – background barks (3), collar jangles and thrashing (5)
- Maddie – background barks (3)
- Leo – background barks (3)
- Alfie – background barks (3)
- John Would – Wurlitzer (4), organ (4), piano (4, 8, 10), vibes (4)
- Little – collar jangles and thrashing (5)
- Maude Maggart – background vocals (7, 8)
- Winifred Ada Lucky – background vocals (7)
- Spencer Maggart – soft shoe stomp (13)

Engineers

- John Would – recording (1, 2, 4, 5, 8–10, 12, 13), mixing (8)
- Amy Aileen Wood – recording (1–10, 13)
- Fiona Apple – recording (3, 5–7, 9–11, 13)
- Dave Way – recording (7, 9), mixing (1, 5, 6, 9)
- Tchad Blake – mixing (2–4, 7, 10–13)
- Bob Ludwig – mastering

== Charts ==
=== Weekly charts ===
Chart (2020)	Peak position
Australian Albums (ARIA)	13
Austrian Albums (Ö3 Austria)	30
Belgian Albums (Ultratop Flanders)	26
Belgian Albums (Ultratop Wallonia)	101
Canadian Albums (Billboard)	10
Danish Albums (Hitlisten)	10
Dutch Albums (Album Top 100)	20
French Albums (SNEP)	97
German Albums (Offizielle Top 100)	20
Greek Albums (IFPI)	22
Irish Albums (Official Charts)	23
Italian Albums (FIMI)	49
New Zealand Albums (RMNZ)	14
Portuguese Albums (AFP)	4
Scottish Albums (Official Charts)	28
Spanish Albums (Promusicae)	38
Swiss Albums (Schweizer Hitparade)	11
UK Albums (Official Charts)	33
US Billboard 200	4
US Top Alternative Albums (Billboard)	1
US Top Rock Albums (Billboard)	1

=== Year-end charts ===
Chart (2020)	Position
US Top Alternative Albums	40
US Top Current Album Sales	67
US Top Rock Albums	67
