= John Would =

American musician

John Would is a Grammy award-winning American musician, songwriter, composer, record producer, audio engineer, and mixer, who was born in Vallejo, California. He has recorded and performed extensively as a multi-instrumentalist (primarily guitarist) and works mainly out of his own studio, Stanley Recordings, in Los Angeles, California.

== As producer, engineer, and musician ==
Would, previously known as John Wood (name change due to too many John Woods), served as a guitarist for Warren Zevon in his 1982 touring band.

Would won a Grammy Award for his work on Fiona Apple's highly acclaimed Fetch the Bolt Cutters record. He recorded a large part of the 2020 release as well as playing keyboards and some mixing. Would's daughter, Amy Wood, is Apple's drummer and co-producer on the album. He also recorded Apple's 2012 Grammy-nominated album, The Idler Wheel...

For the 2021 Sharon Van Etten tribute album Epic Ten, Would recorded most of and mixed Fiona Apple’s version of "Love More".

For the 2022 Netflix documentary White Hot: The Rise and Fall of Abercrombie & Fitch, Would was on daughter Amy Wood’s team producing, composing, playing, and mixing the score.

For Adam Levy's 2019 release, Accidental Courage, Would recorded the record mostly live in the studio with very few overdubs. The band featured Levy on guitars and vocals, Gaby Moreno on guitar and vocals, Charley Drayton on drums, Madison Cunningham on guitars and vocals, Darryl Jones on bass guitar, and Benmont Tench on keyboards. Would also mixed the record.

For HBO's True Blood, Would produced, recorded, played on, and mixed the song "Let's Boot and Rally" with Iggy Pop and Bethany Cosentino of Best Coast, and a remake of The Animals song "Don't Let Me Be Misunderstood". Which featured a duet with Eric Burdon and Jenny Lewis.

Would produced, arranged, and played on a remix of the T. Rex song "Children of the Revolution" for Gary Calamar and KCRW.

He recorded vocals, played lap steel guitar, and mixed Wanda Jackson's album, I Remember Elvis.

He co-produced, recorded, and mixed and played lap steel guitar on Graham Parker's album Your Country.

He has also worked with Lucinda Williams, Wild Colonials, Chuck E. Weiss, and many other prominent musicians/entertainers.

He was producer, engineer, and session musician on most of the tracks appearing on A Fair Forgery of Pink Floyd including "Comfortably Numb" by Graham Parker, "Astronomy Domine" by Mike Keneally and "What Shall We Do Now?" by Which One's Pink?

Would works almost exclusively out of his studio, Stanley Recordings, now in Arlington Heights, Los Angeles.

== Television ==
John Would has done music for:

- True Blood
- Grey's Anatomy
- Dexter
- Swingtown
- Gossip Girl
- Men of a Certain Age
- Gilmore Girls
- Three seasons of The Inbetweeners (international DVD release)
- High School Reunion
- Road Rules
- The Man in the High Castle

== As recording artist ==
Would released an album in 2009 under the name The Quincy Blaque Trio entitled Uneasy Listening Music. He has released three albums with the band Yortoise.
