= Andrew Harms =

Drew Harms
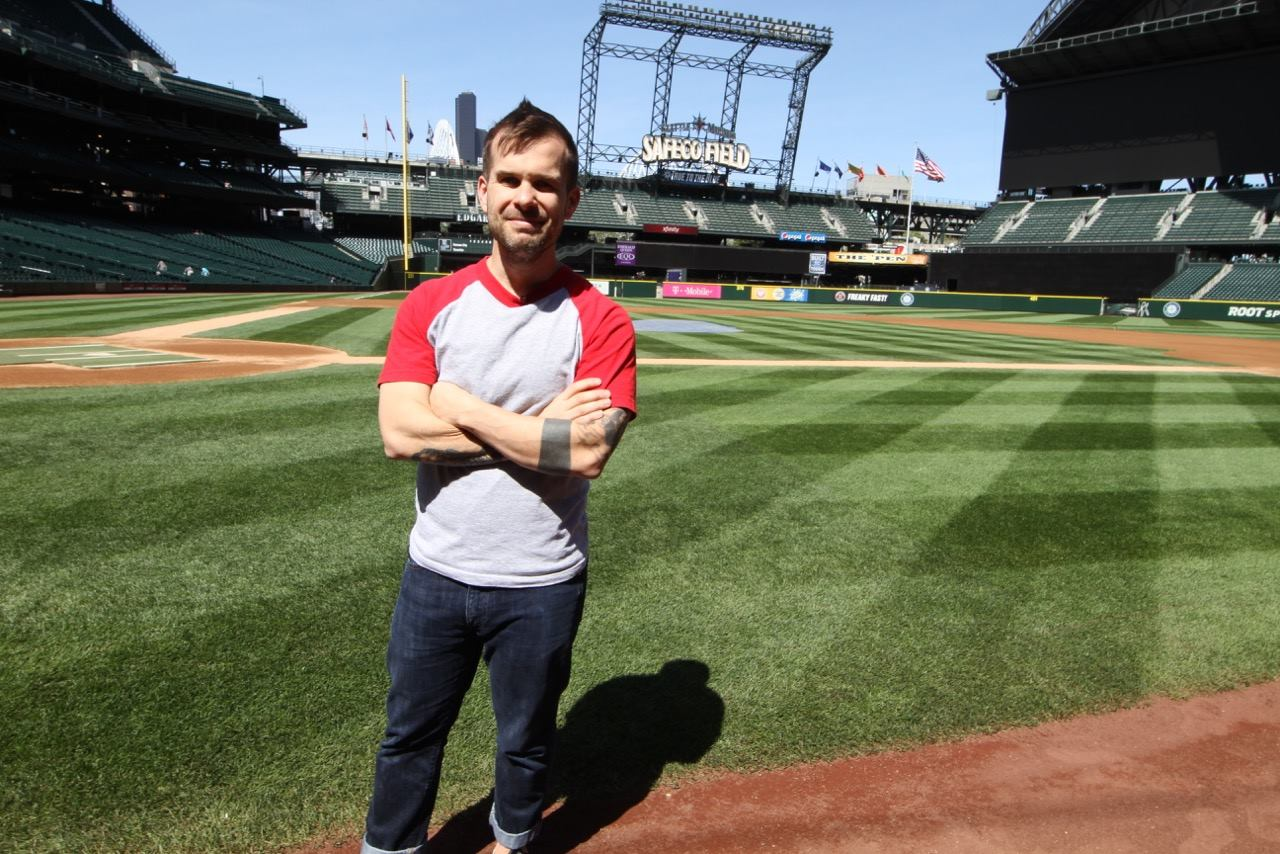
- Occupations: Radio DJ and TV Host
- Known for: Hosting TV Show "In Harms Way" and Hosting on 107.7 The End, ALT 98.7 Los Angeles, and ALT 102.9 Seattle
- Website: http://www.andyharms.com

Andrew Harms is a radio personality and television host based in Los Angeles.

== Career ==
While getting a business degree at the University of Washington, Harms started working at 107.7 The End as a modulator. Within a year he was on-air as a weekend and overnight DJ, though he continued to work in the promotions department as street team coordinator. He eventually moved from nights and weekends to evening drive. He was later promoted to the station's music director, and in 2008 replaced outgoing Assistant Program Director Jim Keller.

In December 2012 Harms accepted an offer from Sean Combs to help launch Revolt TV, a new music TV network but seen over 25 million homes. Hired as the director of music programming, he specialized in alternative, electronic and pop genres, and was responsible for identifying music videos and related content. From October 2013 – October 2014, he hosted, wrote and programmed a daily half-hour show on the network called “In Harms Way", and co-hosted the network's flagship show "Revolt Live".

After two and half years at Revolt, Harms accepted an opportunity to return to radio full-time at LA's Alt 98.7, where he served as the station's assistant program director and music director. Harms also hosts national television broadcasts for iHeartRadio around the world. He left the station in October 2020.

== Accomplishments ==
- 2004 FMQB Specialty Host of the Year
- Leaked an early version of Fiona Apple's "Extraordinary Machine" to national reception
- Billboard named Harms the #6 rock radio programmer in the country in 2016.
