= Extraordinary Machine =

Studio album by Fiona Apple
- Released: October 4, 2005
- Recorded: June 2002 – August 2005; April 2004 – August 2005 (Elizondo/Kehew sessions)
- Studios: Phantom Studios (Los Angeles, CA); Stanley Studios (Venice, CA); Abbey Road (London, England); The Paramour (Los Angeles, CA); Ocean Way (Los Angeles, CA); Cello Studios (Los Angeles, CA)
- Genres: Art pop; chamber pop
- Length: 50:34
- Labels: Epic; Clean Slate
- Producers: Mike Elizondo; Jon Brion

Fiona Apple chronology
When the Pawn... (1999)	Extraordinary Machine (2005)	The Idler Wheel... (2012)

Singles from Extraordinary Machine
- 1. "O' Sailor" Released: August 16, 2005; 2. "Parting Gift" Released: August 16, 2005; 3. "Not About Love" Released: January 2006; 4. "Get Him Back" Released: February 6, 2006

Extraordinary Machine is the third studio album by American singer-songwriter Fiona Apple, released by Epic Records in the United States on October 4, 2005. Produced by Jon Brion, it was expected to be released in 2003 but was delayed several times by the record label without explanation, leading to speculation that a dispute had arisen over its commercial appeal. The controversy surrounding the album and leaked recordings of the Jon Brion sessions were the subject of substantial press attention, as well as a highly publicized fan-led campaign to see the album officially released. In collaboration with producers Mike Elizondo and Brian Kehew, Apple re-recorded the album over 2004 and 2005, and it was eventually released more than three years after the original recording sessions began.

The album was nominated for the Grammy Award for Best Pop Vocal Album in 2006. In 2009, Extraordinary Machine was named the 49th best album of the 2000s by Rolling Stone, and in 2020 was ranked at number 444 on the magazine's list of the 500 greatest albums of all time.

== Background and production ==
After completing a concert tour in support of her second album When the Pawn... (1999) in 2000, Fiona Apple relocated to Los Angeles. "The first couple of years [after Pawn], I didn't have anything left in me to write about ... I just figured if the songs came to me, they came to me, and if not, 'Oh, well, it's been fun'", she said. During her hiatus, Apple contemplated retiring from her recording career. In spring 2002 Apple and Jon Brion, her longtime friend and producer on When the Pawn, met for their weekly lunch meeting. Brion's five-year relationship with comedian Mary Lynn Rajskub had abruptly ended during the shooting of the Paul Thomas Anderson film Punch-Drunk Love (2002), which Brion was scoring. He reportedly "begged" Apple to make another album after being forced to watch hours of footage of Rajskub while working on the film: "I need work that can save me". Apple agreed, and Brion went to Apple's label, Epic Records, with strict stipulations (including no deadline), to which the label eventually agreed. A tentative November 2002 release date was then set.

After performing the then-untitled "Not About Love" at a Brion concert in February, Apple started studio work on the album the following June at Ocean Way Recording, where she played for Brion the first five songs she had written for the album. She debuted the song "A New Version of Me" (later renamed "Better", and then "Better Version of Me") live at Club Largo—where Brion has a regular Friday-night gig, often joined by musical friends—in August. By late 2002, Apple, Brion, engineer Tom Biller and percussionist Matt Chamberlain were at work in a wing of the Paramour Mansion, which was built in 1923 by silent film star Antonio Moreno; the four used the building as a temporary residence from early 2003, and Chamberlain said the experience of recording there was "completely amazing". With the album half complete in April 2003, Brion, Apple and Biller worked at Cello Studios, and a new release date of July 22 was announced. Brion and Apple then travelled to England later that month, to record strings and orchestration for the songs at Abbey Road Studios in London. The album was completed from Brion's perspective by May 2003, at which point the release was pushed back to September 30. But by fall 2003, Apple and Brion were back in the recording studio adding finishing touches to the album, thus forcing back the release date to February 2004 (this was later changed to "early 2004").

Little by little, small details about the songs were revealed through newspaper and magazine articles. An August 2003 article on Jon Brion in The New York Times revealed the title of another song on the album, "Oh Well", with Brion stating that he cried the first time he heard Apple play it. Brion worked solidly on "Oh Well" for over a week, and would later refer to it as the album's "problem child". The November 13, 2003 issue of Rolling Stone reported that the album was "definitely eclectic" and quoted Apple admitting that the album was "all over the place". The slow-paced track "Extraordinary" was referred to as "a Tin Pan Alley-esque blend of Tom Waits and Vaudeville", while the much more energetic "Better" was described as "an OutKast-like deluge of beats".

In February 2004, an item in Spin magazine confirmed the title of the album and a new song, "Red, Red, Red", which Apple said was inspired by a book about optical illusions.

== Delays and leaked tracks ==
In late June 2004, the song "Extraordinary"—which had since been retitled as the title track—was leaked onto the internet. Soon after, a "rough mix" of "Better Version of Me" also leaked, with the following inscription listed as a comment in the properties of the MP3 file: "It has some good bits, but I still think we never have topped the second version. Ideally, we would combine some of this with that, but obviously we can't. Sigh. Ask the others what they think—I know she was partial to both of them, particularly the second". Josh Korr of the Tampa Bay Times wrote, "With a playfulness and penchant for odd sounds and instruments that channel the spirit of Brian Wilson's Smile, Apple's first songs since 1999 make Norah Jones, Joss Stone, Alicia Keys and other pretenders sound like American Idol rejects", while Entertainment Weekly called the songs "tantalizing, brazenly eccentric art pop ... With Apple, the weirder, the better".

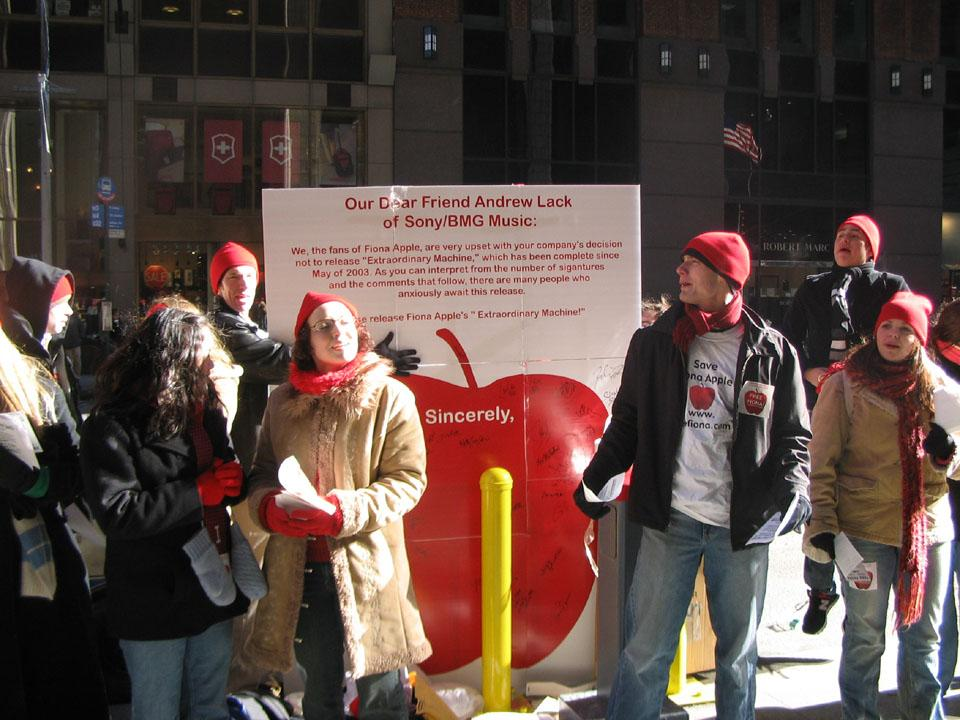
Fans in support of Fiona Apple demonstrating outside the headquarters of Sony BMG Music Entertainment in New York City on January 28, 2005.

After months of no official news, an article about Jon Brion appeared in an October 2004 issue of Entertainment Weekly. In it Brion is reported to have said that the album had been shelved since its completion in May 2003 due to the label not hearing any obvious singles. A representative for Epic Records stated that the album was to be released in February 2005, and that Apple had decided to re-record some of the songs. Brion later clarified the status of the album in an interview with MTV News in January 2005, stating that Epic had desired material in the vein of Apple's debut album Tidal (1996), but that when confronted by Machine, "it's just not the obvious easy sell to them". When USA Today asked Apple herself about when the album would be released, she replied, "You'll probably know before I do".

Shortly thereafter, Fiona Apple fans organized a week-long mail campaign to flood Sony with support for Apple and for the release of the album. In response to the campaign, Epic president Steve Barnett said, "It's our understanding that Fiona is still in the midst of recording her next album, and we at Epic Records join music lovers everywhere in eagerly anticipating her next release". On February 26, 2005, radio DJ Andrew Harms at 107.7 The End in Seattle began playing previously unheard tracks from a bootleg copy of the album, and before long, poor quality copies of "Not About Love", "Get Him Back" and "Used to Love Him" were circulating on the internet. Harms said of the situation, "this is pretty special [...] with an established [artist] like Fiona, to have that happen is pretty crazy, so to stumble upon a full-length copy of the record was incredible", also noting the positive response from listeners the songs had received.

Blender, in its May 2005 issue, included "Used to Love Him" on their list of "20 Songs You Should Download This Month".

By early March 2005, radio recordings of "Waltz", "Please, Please, Please", "Oh, Sailor" and "Window" had leaked online; those were followed by better quality album cuts of "Oh Well" and "Red, Red, Red". Soon after, CD-quality versions of all the tracks were released through the BitTorrent website TorrentBox. They received a positive review from The New York Times, who described the album as "an oddball gem", adding "Had it been released, Extraordinary Machine would have been a fine counterbalance to a pop moment full of monolithic, self-righteous sincerity." Ed Bumgardner concurred, saying the album was "certainly a work of daring and sophistication, as wildly imaginative as it is entertaining", while Will Dukes said "Extraordinary Machine flaunts a quirky, cold-world cohesiveness that's as inviting as it is alienating." According to the file-sharing tracking website BigChampagne in March, 46,759 people were sharing the leaked tracks on major P2P networks. The RIAA later contacted webmasters of sites hosting the files and asked them to be taken down, while the BitTorrent files subsequently vanished from the TorrentBox website.

== Re-recording and release ==
Entertainment Weekly reported in its June 24, 2005 issue that Apple was preparing work on a "second third" album with producer Brian Kehew of the electronic duo the Moog Cookbook, further fueling speculation amongst fans that the leaked Machine tracks had been shelved indefinitely. A July 2005 online chat, little noticed at the time, occurred with hip hop musician Questlove on a website devoted to the Roots. He said the album was "not cancelled", was in co-production with Mike Elizondo, and would be a DualDisc, all of which was later confirmed as true. (Questlove also said he played drums on the album, and in the March 2005 issue of Rolling Stone, he had said he may collaborate with Apple on her next album.)

Brion has originally referred Elizondo (who had played bass in the orchestra on two When the Pawn tracks) to Apple as a co-producer when she had first told Brion that she wanted to re-do some songs on the record. The trio hung out for half a day at Elizondo’s house with the plan for Brion and Elizondo to work on a handful of songs together, but around the same time, Brion was asked to score Eternal Sunshine of the Spotless Mind. Upon Apple eventually deciding to re-approach almost every track, Brion “gave Elizondo his blessing”, to finish the record.

After months of silence, Epic released a statement regarding the album's future on August 15, 2005: Extraordinary Machine was to be officially released on October 4, 2005, extensively reworked by co-producers Elizondo and Kehew. One reporter described Elizondo as "a curious departure from Brion" because of his more well-known production work with popular hip hop artists such as 50 Cent, Dr. Dre and Eminem. He and Kehew worked at the Phantom Studio located behind Elizondo's Westlake Village home, reworking each song; track by track they built from Apple's piano and vocals, added live drums with the help of Abe Laboriel Jr. and Questlove, and then instrumental flourishes. Once the song frameworks had been completed, Apple returned to the studio and recorded final performances. The album cover is a photograph of an agapanthus bud, taken by Apple in her front yard; in a 2006 interview, she said, "...it just seemed like a really cool image to have on an album cover."

Of the eleven tracks previously leaked, two remained unchanged: "Extraordinary Machine" and "Waltz"; but nine were completely rearranged. One new song, "Parting Gift", was also included on the album; it is a solo vocal piece with piano that was recorded on the first take. Elizondo said he felt that most of the tracks sound "radically different", and that even though he listened to Brion's version, "Everything was done from scratch". The New York Times suggested that Epic Records was not impressed with fan interest in the bootleg, and that Apple never considered the album finished; but by the time of the leak, she and Elizondo had been at work for some time (since April 2004). In an interview with Rolling Stone in September 2005, Apple explained her decision: "I gathered scraps for songs, and I ended up writing the rest on the way, a totally new approach for me...[but] I didn't have enough time to live with the songs before recording them, so I really didn't know what I wanted".

Speaking with Billboard, Elizondo acknowledged that it was "a little disheartening" to be working with the knowledge that Brion's version was available to the public, but applauded Apple's "amazing core of fans" for their efforts to have the album released: "The way they interpreted it was, the label isn't putting out her record, so we're going to do it for her. That's very admirable". However, he defended Apple's decision to press on until the album reached the finished state that she had envisioned. On the day of the announcement, the label placed "O' Sailor" for streaming on Apple's MySpace site (the entire album was made available for streaming on September 27), and they put both "O' Sailor" and "Parting Gift" up for streaming on Apple's official website. Additionally, exclusive video material was put up weekly in the run-up to the album's release, most of which was later included on the DVD side of the DualDisc album along with recordings of five of Apple's live performances at Largo.

Despite rumors that the album had caused a rift between Brion and Apple, they performed together at Largo the Friday evening before Epic's announcement. Brion told MTV News, "She re-recorded a bunch of stuff, but whatever, that's her business. I remain a fan and think she's great, and she shouldn't have to meet too much resistance"; meanwhile, Elizondo insisted Brion was "cool on all fronts" about the proposed re-recording. However, Brion struck out at the bootleg version of the album: "It's wrong...I don't like those [leaked] versions. It's stuff that doesn't reflect what we recorded, for the most part". In late 2005, MTV News reported that Brion and Apple may collaborate again to complete the original recording sessions for Extraordinary Machine and release it officially in the near future. Apple said "I really think it would be cool to compare [the two versions]."

== Reception and promotion ==
Professional ratings
Aggregate scores
Source	Rating
Metacritic	84/100
Review scores
Source	Rating
AllMusic	4.5/5 stars
Blender	5/5 stars
Entertainment Weekly	A
The Guardian	4/5 stars
NME	7/10
Pitchfork	6.2/10
Q	4/5 stars
Rolling Stone	4/5 stars
Spin	B
The Village Voice	A−

The official version of Extraordinary Machine was ranked number one on year-end top albums lists of Entertainment Weekly, The New York Times and Slant magazine; within the top five in The Village Voice, Blender magazine and Rolling Stone; and in the top ten in the Los Angeles Times and Spin magazine. Some publications regarded the album less favorably; Stylus described it as "a rudderless piece of work" and "a bitterly disappointing listen", Spin stated "it's kinda been done", and noted Apple reined in the penchant to overwrite; and Pitchfork (which placed the leaked version of the album at number 46 on their "Top 50 Albums of 2005" list) wrote, "The shame of it all is that Apple, after six years of silence, could've made a more definitive, progressive statement rather than something familiar and similar—and we've got the bootlegs to prove it". Extraordinary Machine was nominated for the 2006 Grammy Award for "Best Pop Vocal Album".

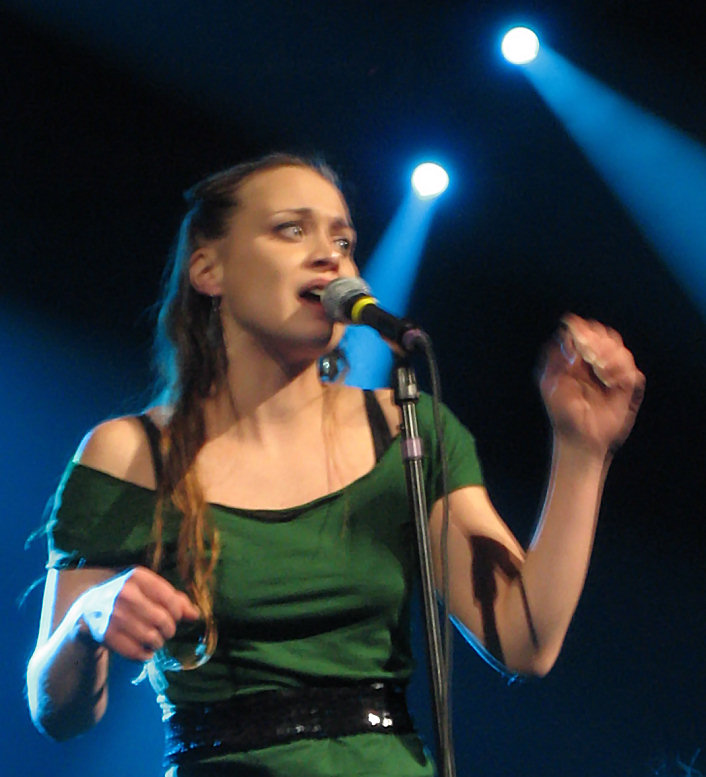
Apple performing in Seattle while on tour with Coldplay in January 2006.

During mid-August 2005 and ahead of the album's release in October, both "O' Sailor" and "Parting Gift" were made available as a bundle download at the online iTunes Music Store. While "O' Sailor" was released separately at other digital music stores, video promotion for "Parting Gift" began later that month. Extraordinary Machine received the best reviews of Apple's career, and was placed as the number one album of the year at Slant, number four at Rolling Stone and number ten at Amazon.com. It debuted at number seven on the U.S. Billboard 200 chart with 94,000 copies sold in its first week of release, making it Apple's first top ten album; however, it fell out of the top ten in its second week with a sales decline of almost 50 percent. The video for "O' Sailor" began to receive television airplay in November, and the following January the "Not About Love" video made its Internet premiere; early the next month, "Get Him Back" was released to radio stations. None of the singles attracted substantial airplay or digital downloads, and consequently they did not appear on the U.S. Billboard Hot 100 or Billboard's Modern Rock Tracks chart.

As of June 2012, the album has sold 1 million copies according to Nielsen SoundScan in the United States. Prior to receiving a gold certification from the RIAA in January 2006 for shipments of 500,000 copies, it was nominated for the New Pantheon award, which honors "left of center" albums that shipped less than 500,000 copies in the U.S. between July 2004 and October 2005. Apple went on a three-week U.S. tour from November 22 to December 11 to promote the album, and from January 25 to March 5, 2006, she supported British band Coldplay on the Twisted Logic Tour. Apple also appeared on her own headlining summer tour from April 10, 2006, to October 29, 2006, with Damien Rice and Davíd Garza as her supporting acts for the 35 shows.

== Track listing ==
All tracks are written by Fiona Apple.

No.	Title	Length
1.	"Extraordinary Machine"	3:44
2.	"Get Him Back"	5:26
3.	"O' Sailor"	5:37
4.	"Better Version of Me"	3:01
5.	"Tymps (The Sick in the Head Song)"	4:05
6.	"Parting Gift"	3:36
7.	"Window"	5:33
8.	"Oh Well"	3:42
9.	"Please Please Please"	3:35
10.	"Red Red Red"	4:08
11.	"Not About Love"	4:21
12.	"Waltz (Better than Fine)"	3:46
Total length:		50:34

Bootleg release
No.	Title	Length
1.	"Not About Love"	3:46
2.	"Red Red Red"	3:30
3.	"Get Him Back"	4:32
4.	"Better Version of Me"	3:33
5.	"Oh Well"	3:51
6.	"O' Sailor"	6:25
7.	"Used to Love Him"	3:43
8.	"Window"	4:33
9.	"Waltz (Better Than Fine)"	3:45
10.	"Extraordinary Machine"	3:41
11.	"Please Please Please"	3:55
Total length:		45:14

Deluxe edition bonus DVD
No.	Title	Length
1.	"Not About Love (video)"
2.	"Extraordinary Machine" (Live at Club Largo)
3.	"River, Stay Away from My Door" (Live at Club Largo)
4.	"Paper Bag" (Live at Club Largo)
5.	"Fast as You Can" (Live at Club Largo)
6.	"You Belong to Me" (Live at Club Largo)
7.	"Parting Gift" (Live at the Jazz Factory)

== Personnel ==
=== Commercial release ===
Credits adapted from CD liner notes.

Musicians

- Fiona Apple – vocals; piano (2–8, 11–12)
- Jon Brion – marimba (1), bass (12)
- Ahmir "Questlove" Thompson – drums (2, 11)
- Mike Elizondo – Moog bass (2, 8, 10–11), bass guitar (3–5, 7, 9), Mellotron (5), fuzz clavinet (5), drum programming (5), clavinet (7), programming (7), guitar (9), upright bass (10)
- Keefus Ciancia – keyboards (2)
- Abe Laboriel Jr. – drums (3–5, 7–10), percussion (4), programming (7)
- Zac Rae – tack piano (3, 5), pump organ (3, 8), vibes (3, 5, 9), clavinet (3, 5), Chamberlain (3), Farfisa (3, 4), Arp string ensemble (3), optigan (4, 5), marimba (5), Wurlitzer (5, 9), celeste (5), marxophone (5), keyboards (9)
- Jebin Bruni – Yamaha Portasound (3), 360 Systems (3, 4), Chamberlain (4, 5), keyboards (10)
- Glenn Berger – flute (3), sax (4, 7)
- Brian Kehew – guitar (4, 8, 10–11), keyboards (4), fuzz guitar (9), Farfisa (10)
- John Daversa – trumpet (4, 7)
- George Thatcher – trombone (4, 7)
- Roger Joseph Manning Jr. – keyboards (7, 8)
- Dave Palmer – keyboards (7, 8)
- Brad Warnaar – French horn (8)
- Jim Keltner – drums (12)
- Benmont Tench – organ (12)

Technical

- Mike Elizondo – producer (2–11), engineer (2–11)
- Brian Kehew – co-producer (2–11)
- Jon Brion – producer (1, 12), orchestral arranger (1)
- Dave Way – mixing
- John Daversa – horn arranger (4, 7)
- Patrick Warren – orchestral arranger (12)
- Adam Hawkins – engineer (2–11)
- Tom Biller – engineer (1, 12)
- Brian Gardner – mastering
- Fiona Apple – cover photography
- Aimée Macauley – art direction
- Lionel Deluy – booklet photography
- Autumn de Wilde – back cover photography

=== Bootleg recording ===
- Fiona Apple – vocals, piano
- Jon Brion – producer
- Tom Biller – engineer
- Matt Chamberlain – percussion, drums
- Jim Keltner – drums (5)
- Eric Gorfain – violin (5)
- Steven Rhodes – assistant

== Charts ==
=== Album ===
Chart (2005)	Peak position
Australian ARIA Albums Chart	53
French Albums (SNEP)	61
Italian Albums (FIMI)	94
US Billboard 200	7

== Certifications and sales ==
Region	Certification	Certified units/sales
United States (RIAA)	Gold	1,000,000

== See also ==
- Cult following
- Love for Sale (Bilal album) – an album by Bilal, also shelved over commercial concerns and notoriously bootlegged
