= Maggart =

Maggart is an English surname, a variant of Maggard. Notable people with the surname include:

- Brandon Maggart (born 1933), American actor
- Debra Maggart (born 1960), American politician
- Fiona Apple McAfee-Maggart (born 1977), American singer-songwriter
- Garett Maggart (born 1969), American actor
- Maude Maggart (born 1975), American cabaret singer and recording artist
