= 7th ACE Awards =

The 7th Annual ACE Awards (renamed the CableACE Awards in 1992) were held on December 3, 1985.

The ceremony was held at the Beverly Theatre, with Shelley Duvall and Joe Piscopo as hosts, and was broadcast on TBS on December 6, 1985. Awards were presented in 43 categories.

== Winners and nominees ==
Winners in bold (incomplete list)

=== Movie or Miniseries ===
- **Sakharov** (HBO)
- Berlin Alexanderplatz (Bravo)
- Icebound in the Antarctic: Shackleton (A&E)
- The Guardian (HBO)
- Finnegan Begin Again (HBO)

=== Actor in a Movie or Miniseries ===
- **Art Carney** – The Undergrads (Disney Channel)
- Robert Preston - Finnegan Begin Again (HBO)
- Louis Gossett Jr. - The Guardian (HBO)
- Martin Sheen - The Guardian (HBO)
- Danny DeVito -- The Ratings Game

=== Actress in a Movie or Miniseries ===
- **Glenda Jackson** – Sakharov (HBO)
- Mary Tyler Moore - Finnegan Begin Again (HBO)
- Jacqueline Bisset - Forbidden
- Zelah Clarke - Jane Eyre

=== Directing a Movie or Miniseries ===
- **Jack Gold** – Sakharov (HBO)

=== Actor in a Comedy Series ===
- **Philip Charles MacKenzie** - Brothers (Showtime)
- John Byner - Bizarre (Showtime)
- Brandon Maggart - Brothers (Showtime)
- Robert Walden - Brothers (Showtime)
- José Pérez -- Steambath (Showtime)

=== Actress in a Comedy Series ===
- **Lucy Webb** - Not Necessarily the News (HBO)
- Jean Stapleton - Faerie Tale Theatre (Showtime) (for episode Cinderella)
- Valerie Perrine - Faerie Tale Theatre (Showtime) (for episode Three Little Pigs)
- Felicity Kendal - Solo (A&E, originally a BBC One show)
- Anne Bloom - Not Necessarily the News (HBO)

=== Actor in a Dramatic Series ===
- **James Coco** - The Ray Bradbury Theater (HBO)
- Nickolas Grace - Robin of Sherwood (Showtime)
- Trinidad Silva - Maximum Security (HBO)
- Geoffrey Lewis - Maximum Security (HBO)
- Robert Desiderio - Maximum Security (HBO)

=== Actress in a Dramatic Series ===
- **Ann Bell** - **Tenko** (A&E, originally a BBC/Australian Broadcasting Corporation co-produced show)
- Susan Sarandon - Faerie Tale Theatre (Showtime)
- Andra Millian - The Paper Chase (Showtime)

=== Children's Series ===
- **Faerie Tale Theatre** (Showtime)
- Danger Mouse ([Originally ITV, aired on Nickelodeon in US)
- El tesoro del saber (Galavisión)
- Fraggle Rock - (HBO)
