= Primetime Emmy Award for Outstanding Supporting Actor in a Limited or Anthology Series or Movie =

American television award

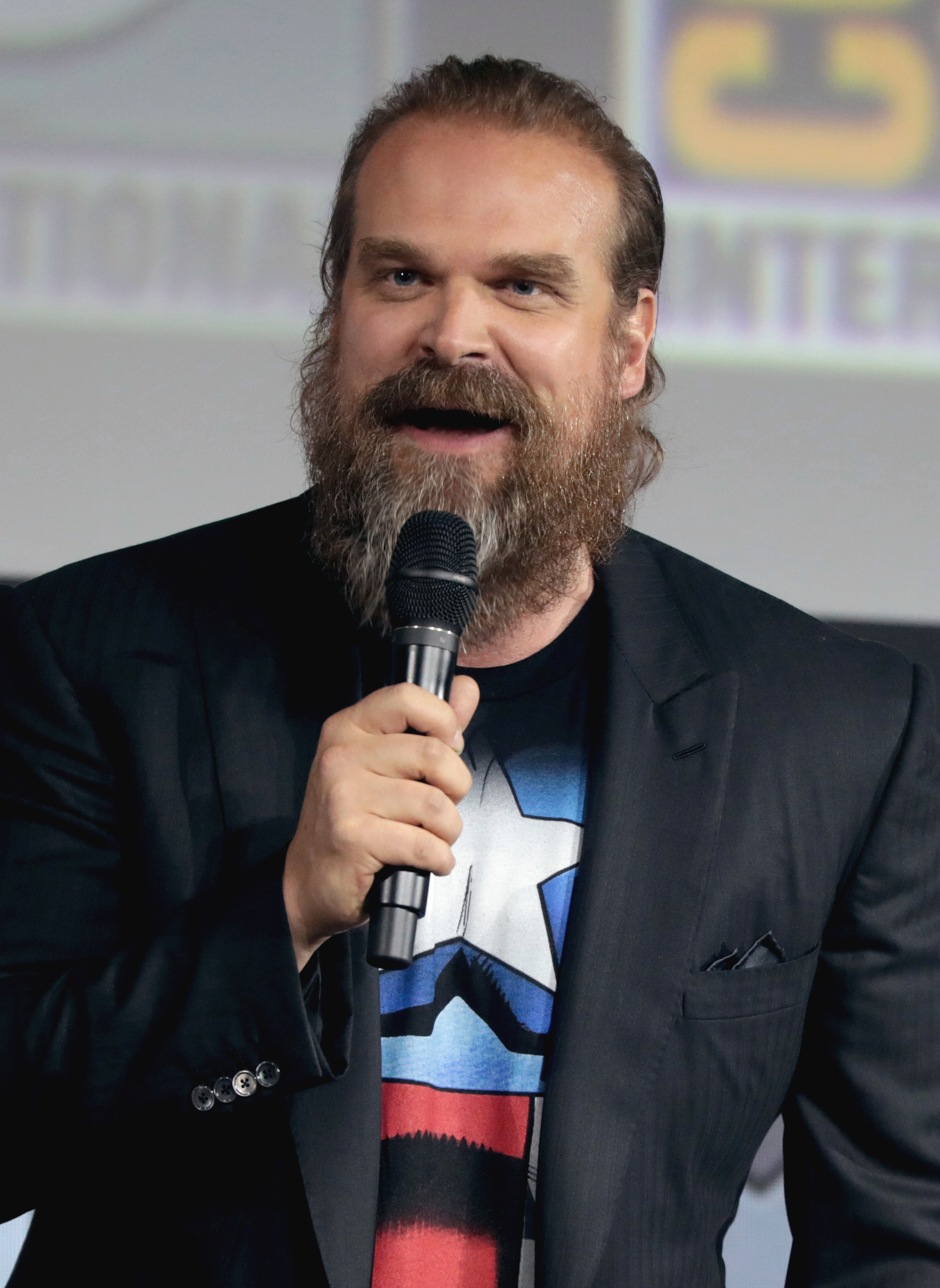
- 2026 recipient: David Harbour
- Awarded for: Outstanding Supporting Actor in a Limited or Anthology Series or Movie
- Country: United States
- Presented by: Academy of Television Arts & Sciences
- First award: 1975
- Currently held by: David Harbour, DTF St. Louis (2026)
- Website: emmys.com

This is a list of winners and nominees of the Primetime Emmy Award for Outstanding Supporting Actor in a Limited or Anthology Series or Movie. Before 1975, supporting actors featured in a mini series or movie were included in categories such as comedy or drama. From 1975 to 1978, the award was called Outstanding Single Performance by a Supporting Actor in a Comedy or Drama Special. Despite the category's name, actors appearing in many episodes of a miniseries were included. In 1979, the award was named Outstanding Supporting Actor in a Limited Series or Special. The award was renamed again in 1986, in Outstanding Supporting Actor in a Miniseries or Special. By 1998, the award was renamed Outstanding Supporting Actor in a Miniseries or Movie.

== Winners and nominations ==
=== 1970s ===
Year	Actor	Role	Program	Network
Outstanding Single Performance by a Supporting Actor in a Comedy or Drama Special
1975 (27th)
1975 (27th)	Anthony Quayle	Tom Banniester	QB VII	ABC
1975 (27th)	Ralph Bellamy	Adlai Stevenson	The Missiles of October	ABC
1975 (27th)	Jack Hawkins (posthumously)	Justice Gilroy	QB VII	ABC
1975 (27th)	Trevor Howard	Abbé Faria	The Count of Monte Cristo	NBC
1976 (28th)
1976 (28th)	Ed Flanders	Phil Hogan	A Moon for the Misbegotten	ABC
1976 (28th)	Ray Bolger	Billy Rice	The Entertainer	NBC
1976 (28th)	Art Carney	Thornton Alman	Katherine	ABC
1977 (29th)
1977 (29th)	Burgess Meredith	Joseph N. Welch	Tail Gunner Joe	NBC
1977 (29th)	Martin Balsam	Daniel Cooper	Raid on Entebbe	ABC
1977 (29th)	Mark Harmon	Robert Hugo Dunlap	Eleanor and Franklin: The White House Years	ABC
1977 (29th)	Yaphet Kotto	Idi Amin	Raid on Entebbe	ABC
1977 (29th)	Walter McGinn (posthumously)	Louis Howe	Eleanor and Franklin: The White House Years	ABC
1978 (30th)
1978 (30th)	Howard da Silva	Eddie	Verna: USO Girl	PBS
1978 (30th)	James Farentino	Simon Peter	Jesus of Nazareth	NBC
1978 (30th)	Burgess Meredith	Cardinal Burke	The Last Hurrah	NBC
1978 (30th)	Donald Pleasence	Vladimir Popov	The Defection of Simas Kudirka	CBS
1978 (30th)	Efrem Zimbalist, Jr.	Mike Long	A Family Upside Down	NBC
Outstanding Supporting Actor in a Limited Series or Special
1979 (31st)
1979 (31st)	Marlon Brando	George Lincoln Rockwell	Roots: The Next Generations	ABC
1979 (31st)	Ed Flanders	Calvin Coolidge	Backstairs at the White House	NBC
1979 (31st)	Al Freeman, Jr.	Malcolm X	Roots: The Next Generations	ABC
1979 (31st)	Robert Vaughn	Woodrow Wilson	Backstairs at the White House	NBC
1979 (31st)	Paul Winfield	Dr. Horace Huguley	Roots: The Next Generations	ABC

=== 1980s ===
Year	Actor	Role	Program	Network
Outstanding Supporting Actor in a Limited Series or Special
1980 (32nd)
1980 (32nd)	George Grizzard	Floyd Kincaid	The Oldest Living Graduate	NBC
1980 (32nd)	Ernest Borgnine	Stanislaus Katczinsky	All Quiet on the Western Front	CBS
1980 (32nd)	John Cassavetes	Gus Caputo	Flesh & Blood	CBS
1980 (32nd)	Charles Durning	Commissioner Russell Oswald	Attica	ABC
1980 (32nd)	Harold Gould	Louis B. Mayer	The Scarlett O'Hara War	NBC
1981 (33rd)
1981 (33rd)	David Warner	Pomponius Falco	Masada	ABC
1981 (33rd)	Andy Griffith	Ash Robinson	Murder in Texas	NBC
1981 (33rd)	Yūki Meguro	Omi	Shōgun	NBC
1981 (33rd)	Anthony Quayle	Rubrius Gallus	Masada	ABC
1981 (33rd)	John Rhys-Davies	Vasco Rodrigues	Shōgun	NBC
1982 (34th)
1982 (34th)	Laurence Olivier	Lord Marchmain	Brideshead Revisited	PBS
1982 (34th)	Jack Albertson (posthumously)	Poppa MacMahon	My Body, My Child	ABC
1982 (34th)	John Gielgud	Edward Ryder	Brideshead Revisited	PBS
1982 (34th)	Derek Jacobi	Adolf Hitler	Inside the Third Reich	ABC
1982 (34th)	Leonard Nimoy	Morris Meyerson	A Woman Called Golda	Syndicated
1983 (35th)
1983 (35th)	Richard Kiley	Paddy Cleary	The Thorn Birds: Part 1	ABC
1983 (35th)	Ralph Bellamy	Franklin D. Roosevelt	The Winds of War	ABC
1983 (35th)	Bryan Brown	Luke O'Neill	The Thorn Birds	ABC
1983 (35th)	Christopher Plummer	Archbishop Vittorio Contini-Verchese	The Thorn Birds	ABC
1983 (35th)	David Threlfall	Smike	The Life and Adventures of Nicholas Nickleby	Syndicated
1984 (36th)
1984 (36th)	Art Carney	Tony	Terrible Joe Moran	CBS
1984 (36th)	Keith Carradine	Foxy Funderburke	Chiefs	CBS
1984 (36th)	John Gielgud	Lord Durrisdeer	The Master of Ballantrae	CBS
1984 (36th)	John Lithgow	Joe Huxley	The Day After	ABC
1984 (36th)	Randy Quaid	Harold "Mitch" Mitchell	A Streetcar Named Desire	ABC
1984 (36th)	David Ogden Stiers	William Milligan Sloane	The First Olympics: Athens 1896	NBC
1985 (37th)
1985 (37th)	Karl Malden	Freddy Kassab	Fatal Vision	NBC
1985 (37th)	Richard Burton (posthumously)	Phipps Ogden	Ellis Island	CBS
1985 (37th)	John Gielgud	Theodore Woodward	Romance on the Orient Express	NBC
1985 (37th)	Richard Masur	Aryon Greydanus	The Burning Bed	NBC
1985 (37th)	Rip Torn	Lewis Slaton	The Atlanta Child Murders	CBS
Outstanding Supporting Actor in a Miniseries or Special
1986 (38th)
1986 (38th)	John Malkovich	Biff Loman	Death of a Salesman	CBS
1986 (38th)	Charles Durning	Charley	Death of a Salesman	CBS
1986 (38th)	John Glover	Victor DiMato	An Early Frost	NBC
1986 (38th)	Harold Gould	Dr. Marvin Elias	Mrs. Delafield Wants to Marry	CBS
1986 (38th)	Pat Morita	Tommy Tanaka	Amos	CBS
1987 (39th)
1987 (39th)	Dabney Coleman	Martin Costigan	Sworn to Silence	ABC
1987 (39th)	Stephen Collins	Billy Grenville, Jr.	The Two Mrs. Grenvilles	NBC
1987 (39th)	John Glover	Richard Behrens	Nutcracker: Money, Madness and Murder	NBC
1987 (39th)	Laurence Olivier	Harry Burrard	Lost Empires	PBS
1987 (39th)	Eli Wallach	Norman Voss	Something in Common	CBS
1988 (40th)
1988 (40th)	John Shea	Bill Stern	Baby M	ABC
1988 (40th)	Dabney Coleman	Gary Skoloff	Baby M	ABC
1988 (40th)	Anthony Quinn	Socrates Onassis	Onassis: The Richest Man in the World	ABC
1988 (40th)	Ron Silver	Ron Levin	Billionaire Boys Club	NBC
1988 (40th)	Bruce Weitz	Rick Whitehead	Baby M	ABC
1989 (41st)
1989 (41st)	Derek Jacobi	The Imposter	The Tenth Man	CBS
1989 (41st)	Armand Assante	Richard Mansfield	Jack the Ripper	CBS
1989 (41st)	James Garner	Bob Smith	My Name Is Bill W.	CBS
1989 (41st)	Danny Glover	Joshua Deets	Lonesome Dove	CBS
1989 (41st)	Corin Nemec	Steven Stayner	I Know My First Name is Steven	NBC

=== 1990s ===
Year	Actor	Role	Program	Network
Outstanding Supporting Actor in a Miniseries or Special
1990 (42nd)
1990 (42nd)	Vincent Gardenia	Michael Aylott	Age-Old Friends	HBO
1990 (42nd)	Ned Beatty	Cornelius Van Horne	Last Train Home	Family
1990 (42nd)	Brian Dennehy	Ed Reivers	A Killing in a Small Town	CBS
1990 (42nd)	Anthony Hopkins	Abel Magwitch	Great Expectations	Disney
1990 (42nd)	James Earl Jones	Alice	By Dawn's Early Light	HBO
1990 (42nd)	Max von Sydow	Szaz	Red King, White Knight	HBO
1991 (43rd)
1991 (43rd)	James Earl Jones	Junius Jackson	Heat Wave	TNT
1991 (43rd)	Ruben Blades	Count Giuseppe Pepito Abatino	The Josephine Baker Story	HBO
1991 (43rd)	David Dukes	Jo Bouillon	The Josephine Baker Story	HBO
1991 (43rd)	Richard Kiley	Earl Warren	Separate But Equal	ABC
1991 (43rd)	Leon Russom	Titus Wardlow	Long Road Home	NBC
1992 (44th)
1992 (44th)	Hume Cronyn	Ben	Broadway Bound	ABC
1992 (44th)	Brian Dennehy	Dixon Hartnell	The Burden of Proof	ABC
1992 (44th)	Héctor Elizondo	Lieutenant Angel	Mrs. Cage	PBS
1992 (44th)	Jerry Orbach	Jack Jerome	Broadway Bound	ABC
1992 (44th)	Ben Vereen	Gene Randall	Intruders	CBS
1993 (45th)
1993 (45th)	Beau Bridges	Terry Harper	The Positively True Adventures of the Alleged Texas Cheerleader-Murdering Mom	HBO
1993 (45th)	Brian Dennehy	John McArthur	Murder in the Heartland	ABC
1993 (45th)	Jonathan Pryce	Henry Kravis	Barbarians at the Gate	HBO
1993 (45th)	Peter Riegert	Peter A. Cohen	Barbarians at the Gate	HBO
1993 (45th)	Maximilian Schell	Vladimir Lenin	Stalin	HBO
1994 (46th)
1994 (46th)	Michael A. Goorjian	David Goodson	David's Mother	CBS
1994 (46th)	Alan Alda	Dr. Robert Gallo	And the Band Played On	HBO
1994 (46th)	Matthew Broderick	John	A Life in the Theatre	TNT
1994 (46th)	Richard Gere	The Choreographer	And the Band Played On	HBO
1994 (46th)	Ian McKellen	Bill Kraus	And the Band Played On	HBO
1995 (47th)
1995 (47th)	Donald Sutherland	Mikhail Fetisov	Citizen X	HBO
1995 (47th)	Jeffrey DeMunn	Andrei Chikatilo	Citizen X	HBO
1995 (47th)	Sam Elliott	"Wild Bill" Hickok	Buffalo Girls	CBS
1995 (47th)	Ben Kingsley	Potiphar	Joseph	TNT
1995 (47th)	Edward James Olmos	Wilson Pinheiro	The Burning Season	HBO
1996 (48th)
1996 (48th)	Tom Hulce	Peter Patrone	The Heidi Chronicles	TNT
1996 (48th)	Andre Braugher	Benjamin O. Davis	The Tuskegee Airmen	HBO
1996 (48th)	John Goodman	Harold "Mitch" Mitchell	A Streetcar Named Desire	CBS
1996 (48th)	Ian McKellen	Tsar Nicholas II	Rasputin	HBO
1996 (48th)	Treat Williams	Michael Ovitz	The Late Shift	HBO
1997 (49th)
1997 (49th)	Beau Bridges	James Farley	The Second Civil War	HBO
1997 (49th)	Obba Babatundé	Willie Johnson	Miss Evers' Boys	HBO
1997 (49th)	Michael Caine	F. W. de Klerk	Mandela and de Klerk	Showtime
1997 (49th)	Ossie Davis	Mr. Evers	Miss Evers' Boys	HBO
1997 (49th)	Joe Mantegna	Pippi De Lena	The Last Don	CBS
Outstanding Supporting Actor in a Miniseries or Movie
1998 (50th)
1998 (50th)	George C. Scott	Juror #3	12 Angry Men	Showtime
1998 (50th)	Hume Cronyn	Juror #9	12 Angry Men	Showtime
1998 (50th)	Gregory Peck	Father Mapple	Moby Dick	USA
1998 (50th)	Martin Short	Frik	Merlin	NBC
1998 (50th)	J. T. Walsh (posthumously)	Ray Percy	Hope	TNT
1999 (51st)
1999 (51st)	Peter O'Toole	Bishop Pierre Cauchon	Joan of Arc	CBS
1999 (51st)	Beau Bridges	E. K. Hornbeck	Inherit the Wind	Showtime
1999 (51st)	Don Cheadle	Sammy Davis, Jr.	The Rat Pack	HBO
1999 (51st)	Peter Fonda	Frank O'Connor	The Passion of Ayn Rand	Showtime
1999 (51st)	Joe Mantegna	Dean Martin	The Rat Pack	HBO

=== 2000s ===
Year	Actor	Role	Program	Network
Outstanding Supporting Actor in a Miniseries or Movie
2000 (52nd)
2000 (52nd)	Hank Azaria	Mitch Albom	Tuesdays with Morrie	ABC
2000 (52nd)	Klaus Maria Brandauer	Otto Preminger	Introducing Dorothy Dandridge	HBO
2000 (52nd)	James Cromwell	William Randolph Hearst	RKO 281	HBO
2000 (52nd)	Danny Glover	Will Walker	Freedom Song	Showtime
2000 (52nd)	John Malkovich	Herman Mankiewicz	RKO 281	HBO
2001 (53rd)
2001 (53rd)	Brian Cox	Hermann Göring	Nuremberg	TNT
2001 (53rd)	Alan Alda	Willie Walters	Club Land	Showtime
2001 (53rd)	Colin Firth	Wilhelm Stuckart	Conspiracy	HBO
2001 (53rd)	Victor Garber	Sidney Luft	Life with Judy Garland: Me and My Shadows	ABC
2001 (53rd)	Ian Holm	Patrick	The Last of the Blonde Bombshells	HBO
2001 (53rd)	Stanley Tucci	Adolf Eichmann	Conspiracy	HBO
2002 (54th)
2002 (54th)	Michael Moriarty	Winton Dean	James Dean	TNT
2002 (54th)	Alec Baldwin	Robert McNamara	Path to War	HBO
2002 (54th)	Jim Broadbent	Desmond Morton	The Gathering Storm	HBO
2002 (54th)	Don Cheadle	Chuck	Things Behind the Sun	Showtime
2002 (54th)	Jon Voight	Jürgen Stroop	Uprising	NBC
2003 (55th)
2003 (55th)	Ben Gazzara	Nick Piccolo	Hysterical Blindness	HBO
2003 (55th)	Alan Arkin	Harry Rowen	The Pentagon Papers	FX
2003 (55th)	Chris Cooper	Thomas Riversmith	My House in Umbria	HBO
2003 (55th)	John Malkovich	Charles Maurice de Talleyrand-Périgord	Napoleon	A&E
2003 (55th)	Peter O'Toole	Paul von Hindenburg	Hitler: The Rise of Evil	CBS
2004 (56th)
2004 (56th)	Jeffrey Wright	Mr. Lies / Norman "Belize" Arriaga / Homeless Man / The Angel Europa / The Antarctic Eskimo	Angels in America	HBO
2004 (56th)	Justin Kirk	Prior Walter / Leatherman in Park	Angels in America	HBO
2004 (56th)	William H. Macy	John Irwin	Stealing Sinatra	Showtime
2004 (56th)	Ben Shenkman	Louis Ironson / The Angel Oceania	Angels in America	HBO
2004 (56th)	Patrick Wilson	Joe Pitt	Angels in America	HBO
2005 (57th)
2005 (57th)	Paul Newman	Max Roby	Empire Falls	HBO
2005 (57th)	Brian Dennehy	Father Dominic Spagnolia	Our Fathers	Showtime
2005 (57th)	Philip Seymour Hoffman	C.B. Whiting / Charlie Mayne	Empire Falls	HBO
2005 (57th)	Christopher Plummer	Cardinal Bernard Law	Our Fathers	Showtime
2005 (57th)	Randy Quaid	Colonel Tom Parker	Elvis	CBS
2006 (58th)
2006 (58th)	Jeremy Irons	Earl of Leicester	Elizabeth I	HBO
2006 (58th)	Robert Carlyle	Sergei Karpovich	Human Trafficking	Lifetime
2006 (58th)	Clifton Collins, Jr.	Jack Hill	Thief	FX
2006 (58th)	Hugh Dancy	Earl of Essex	Elizabeth I	HBO
2006 (58th)	Denis Lawson	John Jarndyce	Bleak House	PBS
2007 (59th)
2007 (59th)	Thomas Haden Church	Tom Harte	Broken Trail	AMC
2007 (59th)	Ed Asner	Luke Spelman	The Christmas Card	Hallmark
2007 (59th)	Joe Mantegna	Lou Manahan	The Starter Wife	USA
2007 (59th)	Aidan Quinn	Henry L. Dawes	Bury My Heart at Wounded Knee	HBO
2007 (59th)	August Schellenberg	Sitting Bull	Bury My Heart at Wounded Knee	HBO
2008 (60th)
2008 (60th)	Tom Wilkinson	Benjamin Franklin	John Adams	HBO
2008 (60th)	Bob Balaban	Ben Ginsberg	Recount	HBO
2008 (60th)	Stephen Dillane	Thomas Jefferson	John Adams	HBO
2008 (60th)	Denis Leary	Michael Whouley	Recount	HBO
2008 (60th)	David Morse	George Washington	John Adams	HBO
2009 (61st)
2009 (61st)	Ken Howard	Phelan Beale	Grey Gardens	HBO
2009 (61st)	Len Cariou	Franklin D. Roosevelt	Into the Storm	HBO
2009 (61st)	Tom Courtenay	William Dorrit	Little Dorrit	PBS
2009 (61st)	Bob Newhart	Judson	The Librarian: Curse of the Judas Chalice	TNT
2009 (61st)	Andy Serkis	Rigaud / Blandois	Little Dorrit	PBS

=== 2010s ===
Year	Actor	Role	Program	Network
Outstanding Supporting Actor in a Miniseries or Movie
2010 (62nd)
2010 (62nd)	David Strathairn	William Carlock	Temple Grandin	HBO
2010 (62nd)	Michael Gambon	Mr. Woodhouse	Emma	PBS
2010 (62nd)	John Goodman	Neal Nicol	You Don't Know Jack	HBO
2010 (62nd)	Jonathan Pryce	Mr. Buxton	Return to Cranford	PBS
2010 (62nd)	Patrick Stewart	King Claudius / Ghost	Hamlet	PBS
2011 (63rd)
2011 (63rd)	Guy Pearce	Monty Beragon	Mildred Pierce	HBO
2011 (63rd)	Paul Giamatti	Ben Bernanke	Too Big to Fail	HBO
2011 (63rd)	Brían F. O'Byrne	Bert Pierce	Mildred Pierce	HBO
2011 (63rd)	Tom Wilkinson	Joseph P. Kennedy Sr.	The Kennedys	Reelz
2011 (63rd)	James Woods	Richard Fuld Jr.	Too Big to Fail	HBO
2012 (64th)
2012 (64th)	Tom Berenger	Jim Vance	Hatfields & McCoys	History
2012 (64th)	Martin Freeman	John Watson	Sherlock: A Scandal in Belgravia	PBS
2012 (64th)	Ed Harris	John McCain	Game Change	HBO
2012 (64th)	Denis O'Hare	Larry Harvey	American Horror Story	FX
2012 (64th)	David Strathairn	John Dos Passos	Hemingway & Gellhorn	HBO
2013 (65th)
2013 (65th)	James Cromwell	Dr. Arthur Arden	American Horror Story: Asylum	FX
2013 (65th)	Scott Bakula	Bob Black	Behind the Candelabra	HBO
2013 (65th)	John Benjamin Hickey	Sean Tolkey	The Big C: Hereafter	Showtime
2013 (65th)	Peter Mullan	Matt Mitcham	Top of the Lake	Sundance
2013 (65th)	Zachary Quinto	Dr. Oliver Thredson	American Horror Story: Asylum	FX
2014 (66th)
2014 (66th)	Martin Freeman	John Watson	Sherlock: His Last Vow	PBS
2014 (66th)	Matt Bomer	Felix Turner	The Normal Heart	HBO
2014 (66th)	Colin Hanks	Officer Gus Grimly	Fargo	FX
2014 (66th)	Joe Mantello	Mickey Marcus	The Normal Heart	HBO
2014 (66th)	Alfred Molina	Ben Weeks	The Normal Heart	HBO
2014 (66th)	Jim Parsons	Tommy Boatwright	The Normal Heart	HBO
Outstanding Supporting Actor in a Limited Series or Movie
2015 (67th)
2015 (67th)	Bill Murray	Jack Kennison	Olive Kitteridge	HBO
2015 (67th)	Richard Cabral	Hector Tontz	American Crime	ABC
2015 (67th)	Damian Lewis	Henry VIII	Wolf Hall	PBS
2015 (67th)	Denis O'Hare	Stanley	American Horror Story: Freak Show	FX
2015 (67th)	Finn Wittrock	Dandy Mott	American Horror Story: Freak Show	FX
2015 (67th)	Michael K. Williams	Jack Gee	Bessie	HBO
2016 (68th)
2016 (68th)	Sterling K. Brown	Christopher Darden	The People v. O. J. Simpson: American Crime Story	FX
2016 (68th)	Hugh Laurie	Richard Onslow Roper	The Night Manager	AMC
2016 (68th)	Jesse Plemons	Ed Blumquist	Fargo	FX
2016 (68th)	David Schwimmer	Robert Kardashian	The People v. O. J. Simpson: American Crime Story	FX
2016 (68th)	John Travolta	Robert Shapiro	The People v. O. J. Simpson: American Crime Story	FX
2016 (68th)	Bokeem Woodbine	Mike Milligan	Fargo	FX
2017 (69th)
2017 (69th)	Alexander Skarsgård	Perry Wright	Big Little Lies	HBO
2017 (69th)	Bill Camp	Dennis Box	The Night Of	HBO
2017 (69th)	Alfred Molina	Robert Aldrich	Feud: Bette and Joan	FX
2017 (69th)	David Thewlis	V. M. Varga	Fargo	FX
2017 (69th)	Stanley Tucci	Jack L. Warner	Feud: Bette and Joan	FX
2017 (69th)	Michael K. Williams	Freddy Knight	The Night Of	HBO
2018 (70th)
2018 (70th)	Jeff Daniels	Frank Griffin	Godless	Netflix
2018 (70th)	Brandon Victor Dixon	Judas Iscariot	Jesus Christ Superstar Live in Concert	NBC
2018 (70th)	John Leguizamo	Jacob Vazquez	Waco	Paramount
2018 (70th)	Ricky Martin	Antonio D'Amico	The Assassination of Gianni Versace: American Crime Story	FX
2018 (70th)	Édgar Ramírez	Gianni Versace	The Assassination of Gianni Versace: American Crime Story	FX
2018 (70th)	Michael Stuhlbarg	Richard Clarke	The Looming Tower	Hulu
2018 (70th)	Finn Wittrock	Jeffrey Trail	The Assassination of Gianni Versace: American Crime Story	FX
2019 (71st)
2019 (71st)	Ben Whishaw	Norman Josiffe / Norman Scott	A Very English Scandal	Prime Video
2019 (71st)	Asante Blackk	Kevin Richardson	When They See Us	Netflix
2019 (71st)	Paul Dano	David Sweat	Escape at Dannemora	Showtime
2019 (71st)	John Leguizamo	Raymond Santana Sr.	When They See Us	Netflix
2019 (71st)	Stellan Skarsgård	Boris Shcherbina	Chernobyl	HBO
2019 (71st)	Michael K. Williams	Bobby McCray	When They See Us	Netflix

=== 2020s ===
Year	Actor	Role	Program	Network
Outstanding Supporting Actor in a Limited Series or Movie
2020 (72nd)
2020 (72nd)	Yahya Abdul-Mateen II	Calvin "Cal" Abar / Jon Osterman / Dr. Manhattan	Watchmen	HBO
2020 (72nd)	Jovan Adepo	Young Will Reeves / Hooded Justice	Watchmen	HBO
2020 (72nd)	Tituss Burgess	Titus Andromedon	Unbreakable Kimmy Schmidt: Kimmy vs the Reverend	Netflix
2020 (72nd)	Louis Gossett Jr.	Will Reeves / Hooded Justice	Watchmen	HBO
2020 (72nd)	Dylan McDermott	Ernest "Ernie" West	Hollywood	Netflix
2020 (72nd)	Jim Parsons	Henry Willson	Hollywood	Netflix
Outstanding Supporting Actor in a Limited or Anthology Series or Movie
2021 (73rd)
2021 (73rd)	Evan Peters	Detective Colin Zabel	Mare of Easttown	HBO
2021 (73rd)	Thomas Brodie-Sangster	Benny Watts	The Queen's Gambit	Netflix
2021 (73rd)	Daveed Diggs	Marquis de Lafayette / Thomas Jefferson	Hamilton	Disney+
2021 (73rd)	Paapa Essiedu	Kwame	I May Destroy You	HBO
2021 (73rd)	Jonathan Groff	King George III	Hamilton	Disney+
2021 (73rd)	Anthony Ramos	John Laurens / Philip Hamilton	Hamilton	Disney+
2022 (74th)
2022 (74th)	Murray Bartlett	Armond	The White Lotus	HBO
2022 (74th)	Jake Lacy	Shane Patton	The White Lotus	HBO
2022 (74th)	Will Poulter	Billy Cutler	Dopesick	Hulu
2022 (74th)	Seth Rogen	Rand Gauthier	Pam & Tommy	Hulu
2022 (74th)	Peter Sarsgaard	Rick Mountcastle	Dopesick	Hulu
2022 (74th)	Michael Stuhlbarg	Richard Sackler	Dopesick	Hulu
2022 (74th)	Steve Zahn	Mark Mossbacher	The White Lotus	HBO
2023 (75th)
2023 (75th)	Paul Walter Hauser	Larry Hall	Black Bird	Apple TV+
2023 (75th)	Murray Bartlett	Nick De Noia	Welcome to Chippendales	Hulu
2023 (75th)	Richard Jenkins	Lionel Dahmer	Dahmer – Monster: The Jeffrey Dahmer Story	Netflix
2023 (75th)	Joseph Lee	George Nakai	Beef	Netflix
2023 (75th)	Ray Liotta (posthumously)	James "Big Jim" Keene	Black Bird	Apple TV+
2023 (75th)	Young Mazino	Paul Cho	Beef	Netflix
2023 (75th)	Jesse Plemons	Allan Gore	Love & Death	HBO Max
2024 (76th)
2024 (76th)	Lamorne Morris	North Dakota Deputy Whitley "Witt" Farr	Fargo	FX
2024 (76th)	Jonathan Bailey	Timothy "Tim" Laughlin	Fellow Travelers	Showtime
2024 (76th)	Robert Downey Jr.	Claude, The Congressman/Ned Godwin, The Professor/Robert Hammer, The Auteur/Nicos Damianos, The Priest/Captain's Father	The Sympathizer	HBO
2024 (76th)	Tom Goodman-Hill	Darrien O'Connor	Baby Reindeer	Netflix
2024 (76th)	John Hawkes	Captain Hank Prior	True Detective: Night Country	HBO
2024 (76th)	Lewis Pullman	Calvin Evans	Lessons in Chemistry	Apple TV+
2024 (76th)	Treat Williams (posthumously)	Bill Paley	Feud: Capote vs. The Swans	FX
2025 (77th)
2025 (77th)	Owen Cooper	Jamie Miller	Adolescence	Netflix
2025 (77th)	Javier Bardem	José Menendez	Monsters: The Lyle and Erik Menendez Story	Netflix
2025 (77th)	Bill Camp	Raymond Horgan	Presumed Innocent	Apple TV+
2025 (77th)	Rob Delaney	Neighbor Guy	Dying for Sex	FX
2025 (77th)	Peter Sarsgaard	Tommy Molto	Presumed Innocent	Apple TV+
2025 (77th)	Ashley Walters	Detective Inspector Luke Bascombe	Adolescence	Netflix
2026 (78th)
2026 (78th)	David Harbour	Floyd Smernitch	DTF St. Louis	HBO
2026 (78th)	Jason Bateman	Clark Forrest	DTF St. Louis	HBO
2026 (78th)	Richard Gadd	Ruben Pallister	Half Man	HBO
2026 (78th)	Richard Jenkins	Detective Donoghue Homer	DTF St. Louis	HBO
2026 (78th)	Charles Melton	Austin Davis	Beef	Netflix
2026 (78th)	Nick Offerman	Chester A. Arthur	Death by Lightning	Netflix

== Programs with multiple nominations ==
6 nominations

- American Crime Story

5 nominations

- American Horror Story
- Fargo

4 nominations

- Angels in America
- The Normal Heart

3 nominations

- And the Band Played On
- Baby M
- Beef
- Dopesick
- DTF St. Louis
- Feud
- Hamilton
- John Adams
- Roots: The Next Generations
- The Thorn Birds
- Watchmen
- When They See Us
- The White Lotus

2 nominations

- Adolescence
- Backstairs at the White House
- Barbarians at the Gate
- Black Bird
- Brideshead Revisited
- Broadway Bound
- Bury My Heart at Wounded Knee
- Citizen X
- Conspiracy
- Death of a Salesman
- Eleanor and Franklin: The White House Years
- Elizabeth I
- Empire Falls
- Hollywood
- The Josephine Baker Story
- Little Dorrit
- Masada
- Mildred Pierce
- Miss Evers' Boys
- Monster
- The Night Of
- Our Fathers
- Presumed Innocent
- QB VII
- Raid on Entebbe
- The Rat Pack
- Recount
- RKO 281
- Sherlock
- Shōgun
- Too Big to Fail
- 12 Angry Men

== Performers with multiple wins ==
2 wins

- Beau Bridges
- Michael Moriarty

== Performers with multiple nominations ==
4 nominations

- Brian Dennehy

3 nominations

- Beau Bridges
- John Gielgud
- John Malkovich
- Joe Mantegna
- Michael K. Williams

2 nominations

- Alan Alda
- Murray Bartlett
- Ralph Bellamy
- Bill Camp
- Art Carney
- Don Cheadle
- Dabney Coleman
- James Cromwell
- Hume Cronyn
- Charles Durning
- Ed Flanders
- Martin Freeman
- Danny Glover
- John Glover
- John Goodman
- Harold Gould
- Derek Jacobi
- Richard Jenkins
- James Earl Jones
- Richard Kiley
- John Leguizamo
- Ian McKellen
- Burgess Meredith
- Alfred Molina
- Michael Moriarty
- Denis O'Hare
- Peter O'Toole
- Laurence Olivier
- Jim Parsons
- Jesse Plemons
- Christopher Plummer
- Jonathan Pryce
- Randy Quaid
- Anthony Quayle
- Peter Sarsgaard
- David Strathairn
- Michael Stuhlbarg
- Stanley Tucci
- Tom Wilkinson
- Treat Williams
- Finn Wittrock

== See also ==
- Primetime Emmy Award for Outstanding Lead Actor in a Comedy Series
- Primetime Emmy Award for Outstanding Lead Actress in a Comedy Series
- Primetime Emmy Award for Outstanding Supporting Actor in a Comedy Series
- Primetime Emmy Award for Outstanding Supporting Actress in a Comedy Series
- Primetime Emmy Award for Outstanding Lead Actor in a Drama Series
- Primetime Emmy Award for Outstanding Lead Actress in a Drama Series
- Primetime Emmy Award for Outstanding Supporting Actor in a Drama Series
- Primetime Emmy Award for Outstanding Supporting Actress in a Drama Series
- Primetime Emmy Award for Outstanding Lead Actor in a Limited or Anthology Series or Movie
- Primetime Emmy Award for Outstanding Lead Actress in a Limited or Anthology Series or Movie
- Primetime Emmy Award for Outstanding Supporting Actress in a Limited or Anthology Series or Movie
- TCA Award for Individual Achievement in Drama
- Critics' Choice Television Award for Best Supporting Actor in a Movie/Miniseries
- Golden Globe Award for Best Supporting Actor – Series, Miniseries or Television Film
- Screen Actors Guild Award for Outstanding Performance by a Male Actor in a Miniseries or Television Movie
