= Terrible Joe Moran =

1984 television film directed by Joseph Sargent

- Genre: Drama
- Written by: Frank Cucci
- Directed by: Joseph Sargent
- Starring: James Cagney; Art Carney; Ellen Barkin; Peter Gallagher
- Music by: Charles Gross
- Country of origin: United States
- Original language: English

Production
- Producer: Robert Halmi Jr.
- Production location: New York City
- Cinematography: Mike Fash
- Editor: Eric Albertson
- Running time: 102 minutes
- Production company: Robert Halmi

Original release
- Network: CBS
- Release: March 27, 1984

Terrible Joe Moran is a 1984 American made-for-television drama film directed by Joseph Sargent and starring James Cagney in his final role, Art Carney and Ellen Barkin. The film, about aging ex-boxer Joe Moran (Cagney) who needs to use a wheelchair for mobility, won a Primetime Emmy Award for Outstanding Supporting Actor in a Limited Series or Special at the 36th Primetime Emmy Awards in 1984. Clips from Cagney's 1932 boxing picture Winner Take All were used to illustrate the character's earlier career.

Reportedly, impressionist Rich Little dubbed much—if not all—of Cagney's dialogue, as the stroke afflicted actor slurred his words and the decision was made to replace his voice with that of Little doing a Cagney impersonation. The script was originally written for Katharine Hepburn. After she bowed out, the lead part was rewritten for Cagney.

== Cast ==
- James Cagney as Joe Moran
- Art Carney as Tony
- Ellen Barkin as Ronnie
- Peter Gallagher as Nick
- Lawrence Tierney as Pico
- Floyd Patterson as Himself
- Edward I. Koch as Moe
- Terry Ellis as Young Hopeful
- Peter DeAnello as Young Boxer
- Susan Lowden as Lady with Dog
- Anna Berger as Real Estate Agent
- Andrew MacMillan as Announcer
- Maurice Shrog as Benny the Wino
- Mike Starr as 1st Thug
- Joe Seneca as Pittsburgh Billy
- David Wohl as Meat Handler
