= Jason Carter (actor) =

English actor (born 1960)

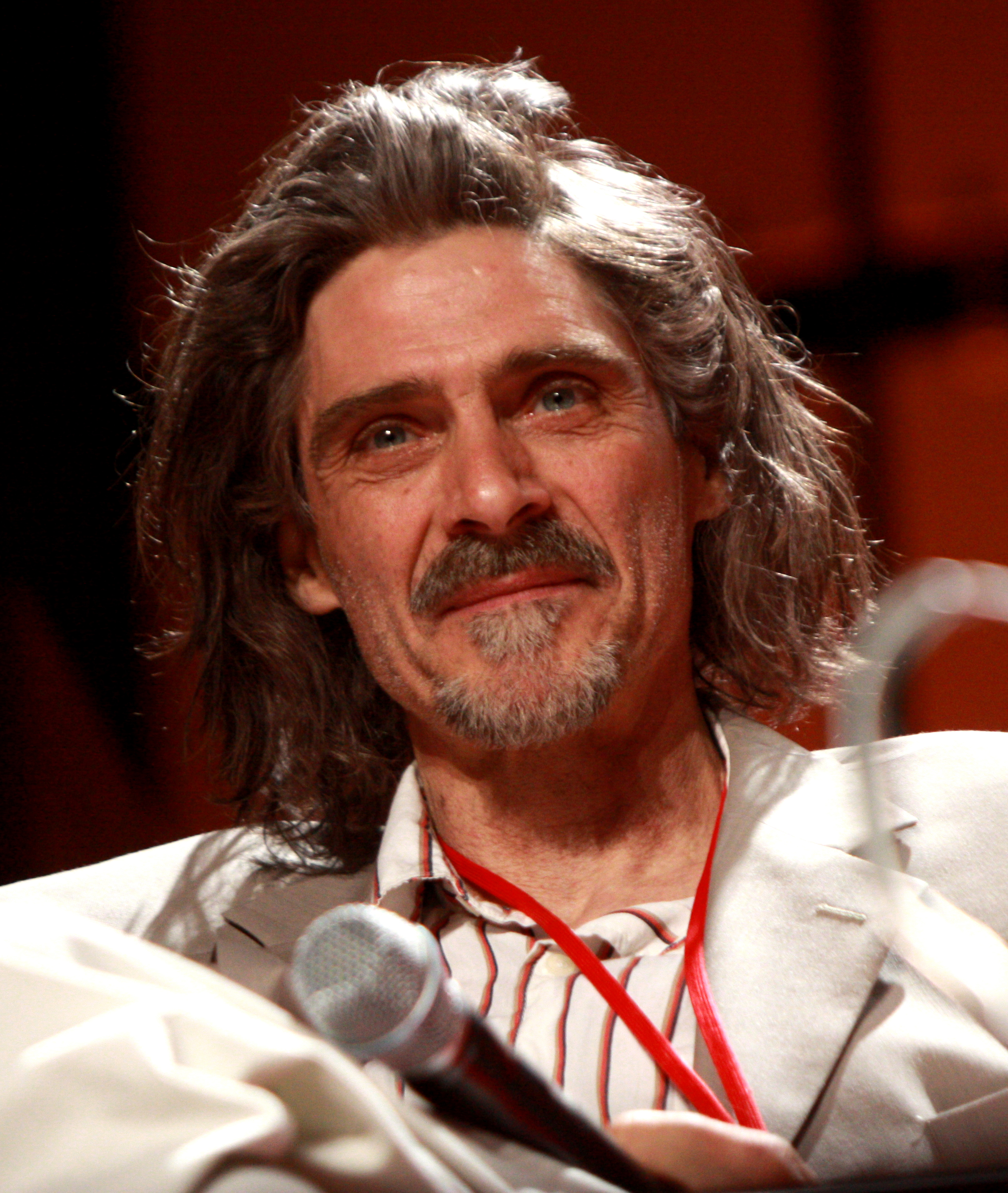
- Carter in 2013
- Born: Jason Brian Carter; 23 September 1960 (age 66); Ealing, London, England, UK
- Education: London Academy of Music and Dramatic Art
- Occupation: Actor
- Years active: 1978–present
- Spouse: Tara Carter
- Children: 3

Jason Brian Carter (born 23 September 1960) is an English actor, best known for his role as Ranger Marcus Cole on the science fiction television series Babylon 5.

Carter was born in Ealing, London and brought up in Gainsborough, a small market town in Lincolnshire. He appeared on stage in childhood. Advised to pursue a career in rubber technology, he opted instead for three years at London Academy of Music and Dramatic Art. In 1982, he landed his first television role on BBC2’s long-running Jackanory Playhouse (1972–85) as Hawkwing. He has appeared in numerous television series including Diagnosis Murder, Viper, Beverly Hills, 90210, 3rd Rock from the Sun, Charmed, Angel, and Babylon 5.

In 1988, he performed on London's West End (at the Phoenix Theatre, London) with James Wilby, Patrick Barlow, Sarah Berger, Paul Mooney and John Gordon Sinclair in The Common Pursuit a play by Simon Gray.

He also played the hedgehog, Hans, in an episode of the television series The Storyteller in 1987. In 2004, Carter voiced James Bond in the video game GoldenEye: Rogue Agent. He also appeared in the film The Duel as William, and in the 2016 miniseries remake of Roots as Viscount Shaw.

== Selected filmography ==
- King David (1985) – Solomon
- Babylon 5 (1995–1996) – Marcus Cole
- Demon Under Glass (2002) – Simon Molinar
- A Midsummer Night's Rave (2002) – O.B John
- The Final Curtain (2007) – Eamon
- Vampire (2010) – Simon, a horror-thriller drama by Jon Cunningham
- The Dead Matter (2010) – Ian McCallister, Midnight Syndicate Films
