= James Kiberd =

American actor (born 1949)

James Kiberd (born July 6, 1949 in Providence, Rhode Island) is an American actor.

He played Trevor Dillon on the soap opera All My Children from 1989 to 2000. A popular character from the beginning, he was paired in relationships with the character Natalie Marlowe (Kate Collins), Laurel Banning (Felicity LaFortune) and later, Natalie's nutty twin sister Janet Green (played also by Kate Collins, later by Robin Mattson). He was the uncle of Hayley Vaughn (Kelly Ripa); for years, Hayley lovingly called him "Uncle Porkchop," while he affectionately referred to her as "Tinkerbell."

"The Book of Lists: The 90's Edition " by Wallace and Wallechinsky cites him as No. 11 between Tim Allen No. 10 and Steve Martin No. 12 in the "15 Top Celebrity Q Scores".

His other Soap opera credits include Another World and Loving. He has been married since 1986 to soap actress Susan Keith, whom he met on the set of Loving (she played core character Shana Sloane on the show for many years).

In 2001, Kiberd filled in for Benjamin Hendrickson in the role of Hal Munson on As the World Turns while he was away on urgent family business.

Since 2001 Kiberd has performed primarily on stage and in film. Of the dozen Shakespeare roles he has performed, his "Petruchio" won the best actor "Zoni" in 2004. He stars as Elliot in the film "Soldier's Heart" which had its world premier at the GI Film Festival in Washington, D.C., on May 18, 2008; winning for best narrative film.

He was awarded "The Meyer Schapiro Artist Award " at Augusta State University in 1999 and the publication of "James Kiberd Drawings" accompanied the exhibit there.

Recipient of the 1994 Danny Kaye Humanitarian Award in recognition of his visionary advocacy on behalf of children worldwide, Kiberd was appointed a UNICEF Goodwill Ambassador for the United States in 1995.

== Filmography ==
=== Film ===
Year	Title	Role	Notes
2001	Queenie in Love	Liquor store owner	Feature film
2002	Demon Under Glass	Dr. Samuel Hirsch	Direct-to-video film
2004	Sunset Tuxedo	Walter	Short film
2005	Survival of the Fittest	Al Walker	Short film
2006	Jack	Sheriff	Feature film
2008	Hunter-Gatherer	Bob the Backpacker	Short film
2008	Soldier's Heart	Elliot	Feature film
2010	Vampire	Dr. Samuel Hirsch	Feature film

=== Television ===
Year	Title	Role	Notes
1983-1985; 1992	Loving	Michael "Mike" Donovan	Daytime serial (contract role; 1983-1985)
1983-1985; 1992	Loving	Trevor Dillon (crossover from All My Children)	Daytime serial (guest role; 1992)
1986	Spenser: For Hire	Lewis Johnson	Episode: "One If by Land, Two If by Sea"
1989	Another World	Dustin Trent	Daytime serial (guest role)
1989-2000	All My Children	Trevor Dillon	Series regular
1996	ABC Afterschool Special	Detective Ben Lawson	Episode: "Teenage Confidential"
2001	Third Watch	Dollar	Episode: "Unfinished Business"
2001	As the World Turns	Detective Hal Munson	Daytime serial (temporary replacement for Benjamin Hendrickson)
