= 36th Primetime Emmy Awards =

1984 American television programming awards

- Date: September 23, 1984 (Ceremony); September 16, 1984 (Creative Arts Awards)
- Location: Pasadena Civic Auditorium, Pasadena, California
- Presented by: Academy of Television Arts and Sciences
- Hosted by: Tom Selleck

Highlights
- Most awards: Hill Street Blues (4)
- Most nominations: Hill Street Blues (14)
- Outstanding Comedy Series: Cheers
- Outstanding Drama Series: Hill Street Blues
- Outstanding Limited Series: Concealed Enemies
- Outstanding Variety, Music or Comedy Program: The Kennedy Center Honors

Television/radio coverage
- Network: CBS

The 36th Primetime Emmy Awards were held on September 23, 1984. The ceremony was broadcast on CBS, from the Pasadena Civic Auditorium, Pasadena, California. 26 awards were presented.

The top shows of the night were Cheers and Hill Street Blues. Cheers won its second straight Emmy for Outstanding Comedy Series, while Hill Street Blues made history. It became the first show to win the Emmy for Outstanding Drama Series four times. This record has been tied by L.A. Law, The West Wing, Mad Men and Game of Thrones, but still stands. Hill Street Blues also added to another streak. It received at least 14 major nominations for the fourth straight year, winning four. Cheers received the most nominations on the comedy side (10), winning three.

Sir Laurence Olivier won the last of his five career Emmys this evening. His win was also the last time a non-Network Syndicated performance won an Acting Award.

== Winners and nominees ==
=== Programs ===
Programs
Outstanding Comedy Series: Cheers (NBC); Buffalo Bill (NBC); Family Ties (NBC); Kate & Allie (CBS); Newhart (CBS)	Outstanding Drama Series: Hill Street Blues (NBC); Cagney & Lacey (CBS); Fame (Syndicated); Magnum, P.I. (CBS); St. Elsewhere (NBC)
Outstanding Drama/Comedy Special: Something About Amelia (ABC); Adam (NBC); The Day After (ABC); The Dollmaker (ABC); A Streetcar Named Desire (ABC)	Outstanding Limited Series: Concealed Enemies (PBS); Chiefs (CBS); George Washington (CBS); Nancy Astor (PBS); Reilly: Ace of Spies (PBS)
Outstanding Variety, Music or Comedy Program: The Kennedy Center Honors: A Celebration of the Performing Arts (CBS); The 38th Annual Tony Awards (CBS); AFI Life Achievement Award: A Tribute to Lillian Gish (CBS); Late Night with David Letterman (NBC); The Tonight Show Starring Johnny Carson (NBC)

=== Acting ===
==== Lead performances ====
Acting
Outstanding Lead Actor in a Comedy Series: John Ritter as Jack Tripper in Three's Company (ABC) (Episode: "Cupid Works Overtime"); Dabney Coleman as Bill Bittinger in Buffalo Bill (NBC); Ted Danson as Sam Malone in Cheers (NBC); Robert Guillaume as Benson DuBois in Benson (ABC); Sherman Hemsley as George Jefferson in The Jeffersons (CBS)	Outstanding Lead Actress in a Comedy Series: Jane Curtin as Allison Lowell in Kate & Allie (CBS); Joanna Cassidy as Jo Jo White in Buffalo Bill (NBC); Shelley Long as Diane Chambers in Cheers (NBC); Susan Saint James as Katherine McArdle in Kate & Allie (CBS); Isabel Sanford as Louise Jefferson in The Jeffersons (CBS)
Outstanding Lead Actor in a Drama Series: Tom Selleck as Thomas Magnum in Magnum, P.I. (CBS) (Episode: "Home From the Sea"); William Daniels as Dr. Mark Craig in St. Elsewhere (NBC); Ed Flanders as Dr. Donald Westphall in St. Elsewhere (NBC); John Forsythe as Blake Carrington in Dynasty (ABC); Daniel J. Travanti as Capt. Frank Furillo in Hill Street Blues (NBC)	Outstanding Lead Actress in a Drama Series: Tyne Daly as Mary Beth Lacey in Cagney & Lacey (CBS) (Episode: "The Baby Broker"); Debbie Allen as Lydia Grant in Fame (Syndicated); Joan Collins as Alexis Colby in Dynasty (ABC); Sharon Gless as Christine Cagney in Cagney & Lacey (CBS); Veronica Hamel as Joyce Davenport in Hill Street Blues (NBC)
Outstanding Lead Actor in a Limited Series or a Special: Laurence Olivier as King Lear in King Lear (Syndicated); Ted Danson as Steven Bennett in Something About Amelia (ABC); Louis Gossett Jr. as Anwar al-Sadat in Sadat (Syndicated); Mickey Rooney as Bill Sackter in Bill: On His Own (CBS); Daniel J. Travanti as John Walsh in Adam (NBC)	Outstanding Lead Actress in a Limited Series or a Special: Jane Fonda as Gertie Nevels in The Dollmaker (ABC); Jane Alexander as Calamity Jane in Calamity Jane (CBS); Ann-Margret as Blanche DuBois in A Streetcar Named Desire (ABC); Glenn Close as Gail Bennett in Something About Amelia (ABC); JoBeth Williams as Reve Walsh in Adam (NBC)

==== Supporting performances ====
Outstanding Supporting Actor in a Comedy Series: Pat Harrington Jr. as Dwayne F. Schneider in One Day at a Time (CBS); René Auberjonois as Clayton Runnymede Endicott III in Benson (ABC); Nicholas Colasanto as Coach Ernie Pantusso in Cheers (NBC); Tom Poston as George Utley in Newhart (CBS); George Wendt as Norm Peterson in Cheers (NBC)	Outstanding Supporting Actress in a Comedy Series: Rhea Perlman as Carla Tortelli in Cheers (NBC); Julia Duffy as Stephanie Vanderkellen in Newhart (CBS); Marla Gibbs as Florence Johnston in The Jeffersons (CBS); Paula Kelly as Liz Williams in Night Court (NBC); Marion Ross as Marion Cunningham in Happy Days (ABC)
Outstanding Supporting Actor in a Drama Series: Bruce Weitz as Det. Mick Belker in Hill Street Blues (NBC); Ed Begley Jr. as Dr. Victor Ehrlich in St. Elsewhere (NBC); Michael Conrad as Sgt. Phil Esterhaus in Hill Street Blues (NBC); John Hillerman as Higgins in Magnum, P.I. (CBS); James Sikking as Lt. Howard Hunter in Hill Street Blues (NBC)	Outstanding Supporting Actress in a Drama Series: Alfre Woodard as Doris Robson in Hill Street Blues (NBC) (Episode: "Doris in Wonderland"); Barbara Bosson as Fay Furillo in Hill Street Blues (NBC); Piper Laurie as Fran Singleton in St. Elsewhere (NBC) (Episode: "Lust et Veritas"); Madge Sinclair as Nurse Ernestine Shoop in Trapper John, M.D. (CBS); Betty Thomas as Sgt. Lucille Bates in Hill Street Blues (NBC)
Outstanding Supporting Actor in a Limited Series or a Special: Art Carney as Tony in Terrible Joe Moran (CBS); Keith Carradine as Foxy Funderburke in Chiefs (CBS); John Gielgud as Lord Durrisdeer in The Master of Ballantrae (CBS); John Lithgow as Joe Huxley in The Day After (ABC); Randy Quaid as Harold 'Mitch' Mitchell in A Streetcar Named Desire (ABC); David Ogden Stiers as Dr. William Milligan Sloane in The First Olympics: Athens 1896 (NBC)	Outstanding Supporting Actress in a Limited Series or a Special: Roxana Zal as Amelia Bennett in Something About Amelia (ABC); Beverly D'Angelo as Stella DuBois Kowalski in A Streetcar Named Desire (ABC); Patty Duke as Martha Washington in George Washington (CBS); Cloris Leachman as Mary Kovacs in Ernie Kovacs: Between the Laughter (ABC); Tuesday Weld as Margie Young-Hunt in The Winter of Our Discontent (CBS)

==== Individual performances ====
Outstanding Individual Performance in a Variety or Music Program
- Cloris Leachman – The Screen Actors Guild 50th Anniversary Celebration (CBS)
  - Debbie Allen – Live...And in Person (NBC)
  - George Burns – George Burns Celebrates 80 Years in Show Business (NBC)
  - Eddie Murphy – Saturday Night Live (NBC)
  - Joe Piscopo – Saturday Night Live (NBC)
  - Lily Tomlin – Live...And in Person (NBC)

=== Directing ===
Directing
Outstanding Directing in a Comedy Series: Kate & Allie (CBS): "The Very Loud Family" – Bill Persky; AfterMASH (CBS): "Fall Out" – Larry Gelbart; Buffalo Bill (NBC): "Jo-Jo's Problem, Part 2" – Ellen Falcon; Cheers (NBC): "Old Flames" – James Burrows	Outstanding Directing in a Drama Series: Hill Street Blues (NBC): "Goodbye, Mr. Scripps" – Corey Allen; Fame (Syndicated): "Sheer Will" – Robert Scheerer; Hill Street Blues (NBC): "Doris in Wonderland" – Arthur Allan Seidelman; Hill Street Blues (NBC): "Midway to What?" – Thomas Carter
Outstanding Directing in a Variety or Music Program: Here's Television Entertainment (NBC) – Dwight Hemion; The 38th Annual Tony Awards (CBS) – Clark Jones; Burnett Discovers Domingo (CBS) – Marty Pasetta; The Kennedy Center Honors: A Celebration of the Performing Arts (CBS) – Don Mischer	Outstanding Directing in a Limited Series or a Special: Concealed Enemies (PBS): "Part III" – Jeff Bleckner; The Day After (ABC) – Nicholas Meyer; Ernie Kovacs: Between the Laughter (ABC) – Lamont Johnson; Something About Amelia (ABC) – Randa Haines; A Streetcar Named Desire (ABC) – John Erman

=== Writing ===
Writing
Outstanding Writing in a Comedy Series: Cheers (NBC): "Old Flames" – David Angell; Buffalo Bill (NBC): "Jo-Jo's Problem, Part 2" – Jay Tarses; Buffalo Bill (NBC): "Wilkinson's Sword" – Tom Patchett; Cheers (NBC): "Homicidal Ham" – David Lloyd; Cheers (NBC): "Power Play" – Glen Charles and Les Charles	Outstanding Writing in a Drama Series: St. Elsewhere (NBC): "The Women" – Story by : John Masius and Tom Fontana Teleplay by : John Ford Noonan; Hill Street Blues (NBC): "Doris in Wonderland" – Story by : Steven Bochco, Jeffrey Lewis and David Milch Teleplay by : Peter Silverman; Hill Street Blues (NBC): "Grace Under Pressure" – Story by : Steven Bochco, Jeffrey Lewis and David Milch Teleplay by : Jeffrey Lewis, Michael Wagner, Karen Hall and Mark Frost; St. Elsewhere (NBC): "All About Eve" – John Masius and Tom Fontana; St. Elsewhere (NBC): "Newheart" – John Masius, Tom Fontana, Garn Stephens and Emilie R. Small; St. Elsewhere (NBC): "Qui Transulit Sustinet" – Story by : John Masius and Tom Fontana Teleplay by : John Tinker and Mark Tinker
Outstanding Writing in a Variety, Music or Comedy Program: Late Night with David Letterman (NBC): "Episode 312"; The 38th Annual Tony Awards (CBS); AFI Life Achievement Award: A Tribute to Lillian Gish (CBS); The Kennedy Center Honors: A Celebration of the Performing Arts (CBS); Late Night with David Letterman (NBC): "Episode 285"; Late Night with David Letterman (NBC): "Episode 291"; Saturday Night Live (NBC): "Billy Crystal, Ed Koch, Edwin Newman, Don Novello and Betty Thomas"	Outstanding Writing in a Limited Series or a Special: Something About Amelia (ABC) – William Hanley; Adam (NBC) – Allan Leicht; The Day After (ABC) – Edward Hume; The Dollmaker (ABC) – Susan Cooper and Hume Cronyn; Ernie Kovacs: Between the Laughter (ABC) – April Smith

== Most major nominations ==
Networks with multiple major nominations (Note: "Major" constitutes the categories listed above: Program, Acting, Directing, and Writing. Does not include the technical categories.)
Network	Number of Nominations
NBC	53
CBS	37
ABC	27

Programs with multiple major nominations
Program	Category	Network	Number of Nominations
Hill Street Blues	Drama	NBC	14
Cheers	Comedy	NBC	10
St. Elsewhere	Drama	NBC	9
Buffalo Bill	Comedy	NBC	6
Something About Amelia	Special	ABC	6
A Streetcar Named Desire	Special	ABC	5
Adam	Special	NBC	4
The Day After	Special	ABC	4
Kate & Allie	Comedy	CBS	4
Late Night with David Letterman	Variety	NBC	4
The 38th Annual Tony Awards	Variety	CBS	3
Cagney & Lacey	Drama	CBS	3
The Dollmaker	Special	ABC	3
Ernie Kovacs: Between the Laughter	Special	ABC	3
Fame	Drama	Syndicated	3
The Jeffersons	Comedy	CBS	3
The Kennedy Center Honors	Variety	CBS	3
Magnum, P.I.	Drama	CBS	3
Newhart	Comedy	CBS	3
Saturday Night Live	Variety	NBC	3
AFI Life Achievement Award: A Tribute to Lillian Gish	Variety	CBS	2
Benson	Comedy	ABC	2
Chiefs	Limited	CBS	2
Concealed Enemies	Limited	PBS	2
Dynasty	Drama	ABC	2
George Washington	CBS		2
Live...And in Person	Variety	NBC	2

== Most major awards ==
Networks with multiple major awards
Network	Number of Awards
NBC	10
CBS	8
ABC	5
PBS	2

Programs with multiple major awards
Program	Category	Network	Number of Awards
Hill Street Blues	Drama	NBC	4
Cheers	Comedy	NBC	3
Something About Amelia	Special	ABC	3
Concealed Enemies	Miniseries	PBS	2
Kate & Allie	Comedy	CBS	2
