= Where Pigeons Go to Die =

- Genre: Drama
- Based on: Where Pigeons Go to Die by R. Wright Campbell
- Written by: Michael Landon
- Directed by: Michael Landon
- Starring: Art Carney
- Music by: Leonard Rosenman

Production
- Executive producer: Michael Landon
- Producer: Kent McCray
- Production locations: Lawrence, Kansas; Overland Park, Kansas; Vinland, Kansas; Baldwin City, Kansas
- Production companies: Michael Landon Productions; World International Network

Original release
- Network: NBC
- Release: January 9, 1990

Where Pigeons Go to Die is a 1990 made-for-television film written and directed by Michael Landon based on the novel by R. Wright Campbell. The film score was composed by Leonard Rosenman.

The film stars Art Carney and was nominated for two Emmy awards:

- Outstanding Cinematography for a Miniseries or a Special (Haskell B. Boggs)
- Outstanding Lead Actor in a Miniseries or a Special (Art Carney)

Most of the crew was taken from Landon's three previous television shows.

The film was shot in and around Lawrence, Kansas and Overland Park, Kansas, and was the last Michael Landon production for NBC.

== Plot ==
A man (Michael Landon) recalls his childhood, and how he and his grandfather (Art Carney) trained and raced homing pigeons. One special pigeon taught him to appreciate the value of home.
