= The Undergrads =

- Screenplay by: Paul W. Shapiro
- Story by: Paul W. Shapiro; Michael Weisman
- Directed by: Steven Hilliard Stern
- Starring: Art Carney; Chris Makepeace
- Music by: Matthew McCauley
- Countries of origin: Canada; United States
- Original language: English

Production
- Producer: Steven Hilliard Stern
- Cinematography: Laszlo George
- Editor: Ron Wisman
- Running time: 102 minutes
- Production company: Sharmhill Productions

Original release
- Network: The Disney Channel
- Release: May 5, 1985

The Undergrads is a 1985 comedy‑drama television film directed by Steven Hilliard Stern. Starring Art Carney and Chris Makepeace, the film premiered on May 5, 1985, on The Disney Channel.

== Plot ==
Mel Adler returns home after grocery shopping. When a fire accidentally catches and burns through his apartment, Mel's son decides to move him into a retirement home. While temporarily staying at his son's house, Mel encounters his Harvard-bound teenage grandson Dennis, who he calls Jody. A day after Mel moves into the retirement home, Jody visits him and tells him that he will instead be attending a local college and wants him to come live with him. Mel, who always dreamed of going to college, comes up with the idea of enrolling as a student.

The college administrators are hesistant to enroll a 68-year-old freshman, but one of them takes interest in Mel and convinces the rest to take the chance because the old alumni would love it. Mel and Jody navigate college life on a budget, getting around on a motorcyle with a sidecar. Jody begins working at a health food store. Mel excels in his English class and even develops a gentle romance with his professor Nancy, but is hesitant to pursue it further. However, he receives low grades in his other classes and decides to study hard. Jody's work life becomes stressful when he is unwittingly caught up in the owner's illegal backroom gambling operation.

Shortly thereafter, Mel is hospitalized after being assaulted by men who wrongly believe that he tipped the police off about the gambling operation at Jody's workplace. Jody starts cutting his classes to look after Mel. After briefly moving back into their apartment, Mel leaves a note for Jody, telling him he is leaving because he does not want to mess up Jody's life. Jody finds Mel at the retirement home and tries to convince him to return to school. Mel initially refuses and Jody returns to school alone, but Mel quickly greets him at the door. Mel returns to his classes, where the students give him a warm reception. Mel ends up passing his classes and Jody's mother and father show up and congratulate him. Mel reunites with Nancy and tells her he is interested in pursuing a relationship. The two of them ride off together on the motorcyle and sidecar.

== Cast ==
- Art Carney as Mel Adler
- Chris Makepeace as Dennis "Jody" Adler
- Jackie Burroughs as Nancy Galik
- Len Birman as Verne Adler
- Lesleh Donaldson as Kim Barrett
- Alfie Scoop as Hobo
- Dawn Greenhall as Ellen Adler
- Angela Fusco as Carol
- Nerene Virgin as Polly Harris
- Adam Ludwig as Professor Sickmier
- Ron James as David Finnegan

== Production ==
The film was shot in Toronto, with the University of Toronto used as a major location.

== Release ==
The film premiered on May 5, 1985, on The Disney Channel. It was first shown to the public as in-flight entertainment on 20 domestic and international airlines on April 1, 1985.

=== Home media ===
The Undergrads was released on VHS by Walt Disney Home Video in 1987.

== Reception ==
Chicago Tribune wrote, "The show has spirit. Locales are pretty. But the script is flat." Caryn James in The New York Times wrote, "The humor and sentiment are far too predictable, but Mr. Carney is so appealing as a wry, wise and wisecracking grandpa that he makes up for the screenplay's shortage of wise and witty lines."

For his performance, Carney received the award for best actor in a movie or miniseries at the 7th ACE Awards.
