= List of The Sentinel episodes =

This is a list of episodes for the television series The Sentinel.

== Series overview ==
Season	Episodes	Originally released	
Season	Episodes	First released	Last released
1	10	March 20, 1996	July 17, 1996
2	24	September 4, 1996	May 21, 1997
3	23	September 10, 1997	May 20, 1998
4	8	February 1, 1999	May 24, 1999

== Episodes ==
=== Season 1 (1996) ===
No. overall	No. in season	Title	Directed by	Written by	Original release date	Prod. code
1	1	"The Switchman"	Danny Bilson	Paul DeMeo & Danny Bilson	March 20, 1996	001
A reconnaissance team in the jungles of Peru comes across Army Special Forces Captain Jim Ellison, the sole survivor of a horrific plane crash. Five years later, Jim is a detective in Cascade, Washington, who has discovered that the heightened senses he gained surviving in the jungle are both a help and a hindrance in tracking down a terrorist bomber called the Switchman. With the assistance of a grad student named Blair Sandburg, he attempts to harness his powers before more innocent people die at the hands of a killer.
2	2	"Siege"	Danny Bilson	David L. Newman	March 27, 1996	002
On the day that Blair is supposed to receive his police observer credentials, a notorious criminal named Garrett Kincad and his gang of felons take over the station and hold everyone inside captive, including Blair. In order to rescue his partner-to-be, Jim must decide whether to confess his new Sentinel senses to supervising Captain Simon Banks or attempt to take on the thugs alone.
3	3	"Killers"	Bruce Bilson	Gail Morgan Hickman	April 3, 1996	003
Jim learns that seeing is not always believing when he witnesses the death of undercover officer Danny Choi with his Sentinel vision. When he loses temporary control of some senses and seems disoriented, he has a hard time convincing everyone around him that he is the only one capable of apprehending Danny's killer.
4	4	"The Debt"	Gus Trikonis	Steven Baum	April 10, 1996	004
Blair's new neighbors certainly leave a lot to be desired when he and Jim learn that they're running a drug lab next door. When he and Jim investigate, they find themselves in the midst of a brutal gang war and Blair must temporarily take shelter in Jim's place.
5	5	"Cypher"	Mike Vejar	Laurence Frank	April 24, 1996	005
Appearances can be deceiving when Jim and Blair discover that a series of seemingly unrelated murders are actually the work of a serial killer who assumes this victims' identities. With the help of forensics specialist Carolyn Plummer, they're in a race against time to unmask the true identity of the psychopath.
6	6	"Night Train"	Bruce Bilson	Harold Apter	May 1, 1996	006
A train ride to escort a key witness to an important homicide trial becomes a trip of terror when a dose of cold medicine makes Jim's senses go haywire. As the miles tick by to their final destination, Jim and Blair must work as one in order to prevent their charge from taking flight.
7	7	"Rogue"	Mike Vejar	Howard Chaykin	May 8, 1996	007
Jim discovers that higher education has its price when he must save Blair's anthropology students from a deadly gas leak. Later, they discover that the leak was just a ruse so the culprit could steal a canister of the Ebola virus from a nearby hazardous materials lab as part of a terrifying scheme for ultimate power.
8	8	"Love and Guns"	Tim Van Patten	Bruce Kalish	May 15, 1996	008
Love puts Blair into dangerous uncharted territory when he falls for Maya, the daughter of a shady gunrunner, but Blair's new relationship is quickly put to the test when he is kidnapped, and it's up to Jim to rescue his partner from a gang of ruthless criminals.
9	9	"Attraction"	Scott Paulin	Story by : Harold Apter & Juan Carlos Coto; Teleplay by : Harold Apter	May 22, 1996	009
Diamonds may be a girl's best friend, but something at the scene of a recent jewel heist is also making Jim's heart skip a beat. He finds himself inexplicably drawn to one of the suspects and struggles to control his aroused senses before the culprit strikes again.
10	10	"Vow of Silence"	Jeffrey Reiner	Bruce Kalish	July 17, 1996	011
Jim and Blair retreat to a remote monastery for a little rest and relaxation. However, their vacation comes to an abrupt end when one of the monks turns up dead and they are trapped at the site with a vindictive killer.

=== Season 2 (1996–97) ===
No. overall	No. in season	Title	Directed by	Written by	Original release date	Prod. code
11	1	"Flight"	Danny Bilson	Gail Morgan Hickman	September 4, 1996	013
Captain Banks and his son crash land in the peruvian jungle. They have a run in with a band of drug runners. Blair follows Jim who sets out to rescue them.
12	2	"Out of the Past"	Bruce Bilson	Story by : Brad Markowitz; Teleplay by : David Newman & Gail Morgan Hickman	September 11, 1996	010
Escaped convict Jay Weston (guest star Mark Pellegrino) is after pop singer Angie Ferris. Jim and Blair step in to protect her.
13	3	"Deep Water"	Bruce Bilson	Harold Apter	September 18, 1996	014
Jim and his old partner Jack Pendergrast are implicated in a murder after unexpected evidence surfaces. With his partner missing Jim must prove he is not a murderer and solve a cold case of a missing heir.
14	4	"Reunion"	Greg Beeman	Story by : Stephen A. Miller; Teleplay by : Harold Apter & Steven Baum	September 25, 1996	012
Jim and Blair join Captain Banks at his twenty year high school reunion, where the Captain's old sweetheart is murdered.
15	5	"Payback"	William Gereghty	Peter Lance	October 2, 1996	015
Ellison witnesses growing feuds between the bikers and the Yakuza.
16	6	"True Crime"	Tony Westman	Daniel Levine	October 9, 1996	016
Ellison is featured in the T.V. show, "True Crime", but things get complicated when he suspects the crew of helping out bank robbers he is after.
17	7	"Ice Man"	Tim Van Patten	Paul B. Margolis	October 30, 1996	017
An escort, Amber Larkin, is attacked after witnessing a murder. Jim and Blair are called in to investigate and protect her from a hit man.
18	8	"The Rig"	Danny Bilson	Story by : Harv Zimmel; Teleplay by : Harv Zimmel & Gail Morgan Hickman	November 6, 1996	018
Employees on the North Star Five oil rig start dying. Jim and Bliar suspect Tucker Brown, an ex-convict. Blair must also help Jim get over his fear of deep water in order to finish the case.
19	9	"Spare Parts"	Paul Abascal	Harold Apter	November 13, 1996	019
Jim and Blair investigate a car-jacking ring, but things do not go as planned when a trap set up by Jim endangers Blair and his mother Naomi who is visiting her son.
20	10	"Second Chance"	Bruce Bilson	John Vorhaus	November 20, 1996	020
The daughter of a Chilean drug lord and Blair's ex-girlfriend is kidnapped by his enemies Under Jim's watch. Jim and Blair team up with her uncle to rescue her.
21	11	"Black or White"	William Gereghty	Peter Lance	November 27, 1996	021
Ellison and Major Crimes work with a replacement bomb expert investigating a series of bombings targeting black churches. Sandburg tries to help Joel Taggart, Cascade's bomb expert, who has developed a phobia about explosives.
22	12	"Blind Man's Bluff"	Tony Westman	Daniel Levine	January 8, 1997	022
While investigating a designer drug, Ellison gets some in his eyes and is blinded.
23	13	"Hear No Evil"	John J. Connor	Harold Apter	January 15, 1997	023
Ellison experiences a dramatic increase in his hearing after having wax blockage removed from his ears. As a result he hears the murder of an undercover vice cop, but has difficulty in convincing the internal affairs officer.
24	14	"Light My Fire"	Scott Brazil	David Thoreau	February 5, 1997	024
A female arson investigator is teamed with Ellison and Sandburg to investigate a series of arson fires targeted at warehouses.
25	15	"Secret"	Bruce Bilson	Story by : Gail Morgan Hickman; Teleplay by : Harold Apter & David Balkan	February 12, 1997	025
Ellison is kidnapped by Norman Oliver, a former army intelligence officer. Sandburg and Simon Banks work together to try and locate and rescue their friend.
26	16	"Dead Drop"	Danny Bilson	Peter Lance	February 19, 1997	026
Blair is among a diverse group of hostages being held in a high rise elevator by a man calling himself Galileo, who demands a ransom and threatens to drop the elevator cage unless it is delivered.
27	17	"Red Dust"	William Gereghty	Story by : Ann Powell & Peter Lance; Teleplay by : David H. Balkan	February 26, 1997	027
Stolen uranium is being moved through Cascade by an international criminal organization using the local Russian emigrate community.
28	18	"Smart Alec"	Tony Westman	John Vorhaus	March 12, 1997	028
Ellison investigates the death of a Rainier University campus maintenance worker. Sandburg mentors a young genius with attitude issues.
29	19	"Private Eyes"	Bruce Bilson	Harold Apter	March 26, 1997	029
Naomi's psychic friend, Charlie Spring, is hired by a distraught mother to find her kidnapped child. Ellison does not believe that Spring has psychic abilities and does not want Charlie involved with this case.
30	20	"Vanishing Act"	William Gereghty	Story by : Daniel Levine; Teleplay by : David H. Balkan & David L. Newman	April 9, 1997	030
Ellison clashes with a manipulative FBI agent when he learns that a mob informant that is supposed to be dead is really still alive.
31	21	"Pennies from Heaven"	John J. Connor	David L. Newman	April 30, 1997	031
Ellison suspects a setup when an armored car spills its payload onto the streets of a poor neighborhood and millions vanish.
32	22	"Survival"	James Marshall	Howard Chaykin	May 7, 1997	032
A cop killer takes Capt. Banks hostage during his extradition.
33	23	"His Brother's Keeper"	Bruce Bilson	Harold Apter	May 14, 1997	033
Sandburg helps Ellison investigate murders at the local horse racing track. Ellison's brother Stephen is one of the suspects.
34	24	"Sleeping Beauty"	Gail Morgan Hickman	Gail Morgan Hickman	May 21, 1997	034
Ellison and Sandburg work with a twenty year old woman who recently awoke from a ten year coma. They try to solve the murder of her parents and to help her adjust to losing ten years out of her life.

=== Season 3 (1997–98) ===
No. overall	No. in season	Title	Directed by	Written by	Original release date	Prod. code
35	1	"Warriors"	Danny Bilson	David L. Newman	September 10, 1997	035
Incacaha and other members of the Chopec tribe Jim lived with in Peru come to Cascade to confront officers of the oil company that is destroying their jungle.
36	2	"Three Point Shot"	Danny Bilson	Darrell Fetty	September 17, 1997	036
Sandburg meets his hero Orville Wallace, legendary Cascade Jags basketball player, when Wallace is suspected in the killing of his confrontational fellow player, Dwight Rossman.
37	3	"The Girl Next Door"	William Gereghty	Harold Apter	September 24, 1997	037
The girl next door is beautiful, charming--and involved in an illegal drug trafficking ring.
38	4	"Poachers"	Tony Westman	Tony Westman	October 1, 1997	038
Jim and Blair stumble into a ring poaching endangered animals.
39	5	"The Inside Man"	Bruce Bilson	Harv Zimmel	October 15, 1997	039
Ellison goes undercover as a bodyguard for a mob boss. He tries to help the mobster's daughter-in-law and her young son escape from the man's influence.
40	6	"Vendetta"	Tim Van Patten	David Thoreau	October 29, 1997	040
Ellison nearly crashes into the car of a computer hacker. The enraged man stalks Ellison, complicating the safe cracking case Jim is working.
41	7	"Fool Me Twice"	John J. Connor	John Vorhaus	November 5, 1997	041
During an Amnesty International peace conference Blair helps Jim protect one of the delegates, Genevieve Benet.
42	8	"Storm Warning"	Oley Sassone	Peter Lance	November 12, 1997	042
Jim and Blair visit Storm Island to celebrate Jim's Coast Guard Cousin Rucker's birthday. With a storm rolling in, they rescue Monique, runaway mistress of a drug lord. They find she is not what she seems when the cartel comes after her.
43	9	"Red Ice"	William Gereghty	Richard Maxwell	November 19, 1997	043
When a celebrated Russian poet and activist is publicly assassinated on the steps of Cascade Museum, Jim and Blair have to work with the Moscow police, but Jim and the assassin have met before.
44	10	"Dead Certain"	Bruce Bilson	Gail Morgan Hickman	November 26, 1997	044
When a body drops from the sky over Cascade, the trail leads Jim and Blair to Pine Crest, a small place where nothing ever happens.
45	11	"Breaking Ground"	William Gereghty	Story by : Steven Kriozere and Harold Apter & Laurence Frank; Teleplay by : Harold Apter	December 17, 1997	045
A murder at a harbourside excavation site opens up an ancient plot involving Freemasons, Illuminati, corrupt builders and a hidden mysterious room full of treasure.
46	12	"Prisoner X"	Richard Compton	Story by : Rick Husky; Teleplay by : Rick Husky & Laurence Frank	January 14, 1998	046
When prisoners at Starkville jail are found savagely beaten - and in at least one case, dead - Jim goes undercover as an inmate to investigate. This would be easier if one of the prisoners had not recognised him.
47	13	"The Trance"	James Marshall	Ann Powell	January 21, 1998	047
When a young, ambitious Cuban lawyer-to-be is shot, suspicion turns on the police. When one of the arresting cops is shot, it's believed to be payback, but the situation is more complex, as Jim and Blair soon find out.
48	14	"Mirror Image"	Rich Tabach	Story by : Rich Tabach; Teleplay by : David H. Balkan	February 11, 1998	048
Someone is beating then killing criminals who got off on technicalities. The MO is identical to that of the killer who shot Cassie in her previous post, but he is in a maximum security prison.
49	15	"Finkelman's Folly"	Michael Lacoe	Harold Apter	February 18, 1998	049
While Simon is recovering in hospital from being shot, he overhears a murder being planned, placing his life in immediate jeopardy. Meanwhile his substitute is trying to take down a major crime lord - by herself.
50	16	"Sweet Science"	William Gereghty	Lawrence Frank	February 25, 1998	050
The death of a dear friend of Blair's uncovers some unpleasant sporting politics and a web of corruption involving murder and counterfeit money.
51	17	"Remembrance"	Dick Van Patten	Joseph Johnson & Tom Fudge	March 11, 1998	051
Childhood rivalry, two very different sorts of fatherly abuse, and the discovery of his friend's body in the woods when he was ten, combine in the present day to place Jim and his father in deadly peril.
52	18	"Love Kills"	William Gereghty	Story by : J. Rae Fox; Teleplay by : Lydia Look	March 18, 1998	052
Jim's senses go into overdrive when he bumps into the long-lost love of his life while investigating the killing of an apparent Buddhist monk. Lila is in Cascade on a mission.
53	19	"Crossroads"	John J. Connor	Rick Husky	April 22, 1998	053
Jim leaves for a solitary trip. Suspecting he is hiding the location of the perfect fishing spot, Blair and Simon track him, only to find themselves all caught up in an army and CDC lockdown of a town wracked by a sudden, mysterious disease.
54	20	"Foreign Exchange"	Bruce Bilson	Story by : Harold Apter & Laurence Frank; Teleplay by : Gail Morgan Hickman & David H. Balkan	April 29, 1998	054
Australian cop Megan Connor temporarily joins Cascade PD as an observer, but she is not here by chance - she has her own agenda, and if achieving it means ignoring Simon and Jim's orders.
55	21	"Neighborhood Watch"	Scott Williams	Harold Apter	May 6, 1998	055
The murder of a friend of Jim's spurs an investigation into crooked FBI agents, Federal Witness Protection clients, and gung-ho Neighbourhood Watch vigilantes.
56	22	"Night Shift"	James Marshall	Richard Maxwell	May 13, 1998	056
With half of Cascade's utilities companies on strike, police HQ is in chaos, and is made worse by a murder witnessed by a man who believes he is an angel. There's an animal loose in the air ducts, and Jim breaking Blair's trust is the final straw.
57	23	"Sentinel Too: Part 1"	Richard Compton	Gail Morgan Hickman	May 20, 1998	057
Blair encounters a woman who is having problems with her senses. He finds out she has Sentinel abilities, and helps her cope with her abilities just as he helped Jim. Unknown to Blair, she is a criminal, and her team is on a crime spree in Cascade, Jim is on the case.

=== Season 4 (1999) ===
No. overall	No. in season	Title	Directed by	Written by	Original release date	Prod. code
58	1	"Sentinel Too (Part 2)"	Tony Westman	David H. Balkan, Gail Morgan Hickman	February 1, 1999	061
Alexis attempted to kill Sandburg before escaping. Ellison arrives and tries to revive his friend. Then they head to Peru in pursuit of Alexis.
59	2	"Murder 101"	Don Kurt	Ron Taylor	February 8, 1999	058
When a top cyber security expert for hire is murdered and all his files stolen, Jim discovers that he'd been working for two rival high tech corporations.
60	3	"Four Point Shot"	Danny Bilson	Harold Apter	February 15, 1999	059
Kincaide has escaped again. This time his target is the Cascade sports arena: his plan is to force the Jaguars' sponsor into handing over $150 million. Blair, and Simon and his son Daryl, being in the audience complicates matters.
61	4	"Dead End on Blank Street"	Don Kurt	David H. Balkan	February 22, 1999	060
Cocaine from a drug bust has gone missing and Jim is the suspect.
62	5	"The Waiting Room"	Michael Lacoe	Harold Apter	March 1, 1999	064
A present day murder leads to a revelation that may be able to finally clear up a 45 year old murder, and vindicate the victim and the boy (now a troubled, haunted man) who saw it happen. Jim discovers a new ability.
63	6	"The Real Deal"	James Marshall	Harold Apter	May 10, 1999	062
Vince Deal, washed-up actor and occasional (usually mistaken) informant for Cascade PD, is sure he has a genuine case this time. Jim goes undercover to investigate, but finds Vince in his way at every turn.
64	7	"Most Wanted"	Scott Williams	Robert Bielak	May 17, 1999	063
Professional thief Harry wants to see his daughter and grandson one last time, but his position on the FBI's Most Wanted list makes that difficult, especially when another thief is using his MO and has killed two cops during a job.
65	8	"The Sentinel by Blair Sandburg"	Danny Bilson	Bill Froehlich	May 24, 1999	065
Blair's mother tries to help him out by giving his dissertation to a friend who is a publisher, so he can proof read it. He wants to publish it and soon everyone knows Jim's secret. The courts want to review all his cases, and Jim is now plagued by people who want to meet the Sentinel, which causes problems as he tries to track down an assassin. Blair must decide whether which is more important: his friendship with Jim or his paper.
