= Anna Berger (actress) =

American actress

- Born: July 26, 1922
- Died: May 26, 2014 (aged 91); Manhattan, New York City, U.S.
- Occupation: Actress
- Years active: 1952–2013
- Spouse: Robert Malatzky (? - 2014)
- Children: 2

Anna Berger (July 26, 1922 – May 26, 2014) was an American character actress in film and television, who specialized in playing frazzled housewives and matriarchs.

== Early life and education ==
Berger grew up on the Lower East Side and began acting as a child. After graduating from Seward Park High School, she studied acting in 1948.

== Career ==
She appeared in such films as Woody Allen's Crimes and Misdemeanors (1989) and the Adam Sandler vehicle You Don't Mess with the Zohan (2008), and on such television series as Law & Order: Criminal Intent, Everybody Loves Raymond and NYPD Blue. She also acted on The Goldbergs.

On Broadway, Berger appeared in Unlikely Heroes (1971), The Rose Tattoo (1966), Gideon (1961), and Twilight Walk (1951).

In the early-1960s, Berger was the New York City Board of Education's drama specialist for community center programs.

== Death ==
Berger was married to Robert Malatzky, and they had two daughters. Berger died on May 26, 2014, aged 91, in Manhattan.

== Filmography ==
=== Film ===
Year	Title	Role	Notes
1959	Middle of the Night	Caroline	
1974	The Taking of Pelham One Two Three	The Mother	
1975	Hester Street	Poultry Woman	
1981	Endless Love	Nurse	
1983	Lovesick	Analysis	
1987	The House on Carroll Street	Funeral Woman	
1989	Crimes and Misdemeanors	Aunt May	
1989	Mortal Sins	Mother Weinschank	
1990	Book of Love	Mama Gabooch	
1991	The Dark Backward	Mrs. Malt	
1991	Mobsters	Mrs. Greene	
1992	Deep Cover	Congresswoman	
1995	The Killers Within	Mrs. Thomas	
1996	Mother Night	Epstein's Mother	
1997	Soleil	Honorine Azoulay	
2000	Sunset Strip	Older Waitress	
2000	Lost Souls	Mrs. Levotsky	
2000	The Amati Girls	Stella	
2001	Ghost World	Seymour's Mother	
2002	Clover Bend	Rose	
2003	The Hebrew Hammer	Harriet Tubbleman	
2008	You Don't Mess with the Zohan	Older Lady in Salon	
2008	Bastard of Orleans, or Looking for Joan	Vesuvia Maggiore	
2011	Margaret	Neighborhood Lady #1	
2013	Chinese Puzzle	La vieille dame	

=== Television ===
Year	Title	Role	Notes
1952	Lux Video Theatre	Mrs. Paletto	Episode: "The Face of Autumn"
1954	Goodyear Television Playhouse	Mama	Episode: "And Crown Thy Good"
1954	The Philco Television Playhouse	Bookkeeper	2 episodes
1963	Naked City	Mrs. Delehanty	Episode: "Golden Lads and Girls"
1975	Kojak	Mrs. Lipnick	Episode: "The Nicest Guys on the Block"
1976	The Blue Knight	Mrs. Goldman	Episode: "Cop Killer"
1976	Harry O	Mrs. Kline	Episode: "Victim"
1976	Street Killing	Louise	Television film
1976	Baretta	Woman	Episode: "They Don't Make 'Em Like They Used To"
1976	Raid on Entebbe	Mrs. Berg	Television film
1977	Rhoda	Betsy	Episode: "The Ultimatum"
1977	Seventh Avenue	Celia Blackman	3 episodes
1977, 1981	Barney Miller	Miriam Buckman / Georgia Himmel	2 episodes
1977	Contract on Cherry Street	Mrs. Moore	Television film
1978	The Last Tenant	Mrs. Munro	Television film
1979	CHiPs	Mary Taylor	Episode: "Repo Man"
1979	Ryan's Hope	Beryl Feldman	15 episodes
1981	Cagney & Lacey	Mrs. Goldman	Episode: "Pilot"
1984	Terrible Joe Moran	Real Estate Agent	Television film
1987	Leg Work	Older Woman	Episode: "Things That Go Bump in the Night"
1988	Hothouse	Herbert's Mother	Episode: "His Mother"
1990	People Like Us	Hester Slatkin	Television film
1990	Singer & Sons	Mrs. Tarkasian	4 episodes
1990	Thirtysomething	Lotte Strauss	Episode: "Photo Opportunity"
1991	N.Y.P.D. Mounted	Woman	Television film
1991	Nurses	Mrs. Garber	Episode: "Coming to America"
1992–1993	Civil Wars	Betty Howell	4 episodes
1993	Johnny Bago	Ma Tenuti	6 episodes
1994	Empty Nest	Bella	Episode: "What's a Mother to Do?"
1994	Chicago Hope	Mary Collito	2 episodes
1994	Murphy Brown	Secretary #70	Episode: "The Secret Life of Jim Dial"
1994	The George Carlin Show	Cat Woman	Episode: "George Puts on a Happy Face"
1994	Missing Parents	Elaine Freiburg	Television film
1995	The Commish	Ruby Simpkins	Episode: "Letting Go"
1995	Charlie Grace	Old Woman	Episode: "One Simple Little Favor"
1996	Tracey Takes On...	Judge	Episode: "Law"
1996	The Home Court	Aunt Sophie	Episode: "Love, Death & Soda"
1996	ER	Mr. Brazil's Caregiver	Episode: "Fear of Flying"
1996, 1998, 2005	NYPD Blue	Belle / Rosemary / Marian Kadell	3 episodes
1997	Sunset Beach	Mrs. Farmer	Episode #1.226
1997–1998	The Nanny	Marilyn	2 episodes
1998	Nothing Sacred	Grandmother Owens	Episode: "Holy Words"
1998, 2000	Everybody Loves Raymond	Rita Stipe	2 episodes
1999	The Thirteenth Year	Irate Tourist	Television film
2000	Something to Sing About	Mrs. Goldberg	Television film
2000	Bette	The Housewife	Episode: "Halloween"
2000	JAG	Mrs. Palermo	Episode: "JAG TV"
2002	The Sopranos	Cookie Cirillo	2 episodes
2002	Law & Order: Special Victims Unit	Karen's Grandmother	Episode: "Resilience"
2002	New Americans	Mrs. Rabinowitz	Television film
2005	CSI: Crime Scene Investigation	Betsy Lewis	Episode: "Snakes"
2005	Law & Order: Criminal Intent	Amy	Episode: "Diamond Dogs"
