= Brandon Maggart =

American actor

- Born: Roscoe Maggart Jr. December 12, 1933 (age 92); Carthage, Tennessee, U.S.
- Occupations: Actor; painter; author
- Children: 7, including Fiona Apple, Maude, and Garett

Brandon Maggart (born December 12, 1933) is an American actor, painter, and author.

== Life and career ==
Maggart was born Roscoe Maggart Jr. in Carthage, Tennessee. His acting career began in the early 1950s, at the University of Tennessee. He sang with The Knoxville Symphony and won a coveted Grace Moore Award for further study in New York City. Once in New York, he won the Theatre World Award for his performance in the musical revue, Put it in Writing.

He appeared as Buddy in the "Buddy and Jim" sketches with James Catusi in the first season of Sesame Street, in 1969. In 1970, he was nominated for a Tony Award for Best Performance by a Featured Actor in a Musical for his role in Applause. He played Cleveland Sam in Dressed to Kill and starred as Harry Stadling in the cult film Christmas Evil, both in 1980. In 1982 he played Garp's wrestling coach in The World According to Garp. He then played George Elliot in the short lived NBC series Jennifer Slept Here with Georgia Engel and Ann Jillian from 1983-84.

From 1984 to 1989, Maggart starred on the groundbreaking Showtime original comedy Brothers, where he played eldest brother Lou Waters. For his role on Brothers, Maggart was nominated for four CableACE Awards (for Best Actor in a Comedy Series) in 1985, 1986, 1988 and 1989.

Shortly after Brothers ended its run, Maggart appeared as the Lynn Redgrave character's brother on the short-lived Jackie Mason sitcom Chicken Soup. In 1997 he appeared on Married... with Children. In 1990, he had a guest turn on the Fox sitcom Babes, playing the ex-husband of Susan Peretz's character, Darlene Gilbert. Since that time, Maggart has devoted much of his time to painting and writing. His paintings have been featured on The Venice Art Walk. His poem Diversity in Venice was read at The Venice Centennial in 2005. His first book is an autobiographical trilogy/memoir called Papa's Footprint. It tells the tale of a four-million-year-old actor and father, from Africa to Broadway and Hollywood.

== Personal life ==
Maggart has been married once (1955–1971); with his wife, LuJan, he is the father of five children, including Garett Maggart. He is also the father of Fiona Apple and Maude Maggart, with Diane McAfee.
