= Demon Under Glass =

- Directed by: Jon Cunningham
- Written by: Deborah L. Warner; JoCunningham
- Produced by: Jon Cunningham; Deborah L. Warner; Lucy Doty; Ralph Lliteras; Marguerite Lliteras
- Starring: Jason Carter; Garett Maggart; Kira Reed; Jack Donner; Denise Alessandria Hurd; Ray Proscia
- Cinematography: Michael Dean; Morgan Susser
- Edited by: Steve Allen Robison
- Music by: Gottfried Neumeister
- Production company: Dragoncor/Earth Draggon
- Distributed by: Brentwood Home Video
- Release date: June 20, 2002
- Country: United States
- Language: English

Demon Under Glass is a 2002 film directed by Jon Cunningham. The film tells the story of a centuries-old vampire, Simon Molinar (Jason Carter) who gets captured by a government group calling themselves The Delphi Project. The team of scientists and government officials proceed to study the vampire in captivity. It's only one member of the team, a Dr. Joe McKay, who starts to treat the vampire captive like an actual person rather than as an experiment. Dr. Mckay is forced to see the humanity of their monster captive and the ruthless cruelty of his own team and raises the question of what defines a monster?

== Plot ==
Someone has been killing women in LA and leaving the bodies drained of blood. The police planned a sting using a female officer, Detective Gwen Taylor (Denise Alessandria Hurd) however the killer was instead intercepted and captured by a group calling itself The Delphi Project. The Delphi Project is a secret government group intent on capturing and studying a live vampire and as it turns out the killer that they are after is actually a thousand year old vampire going by the name Simon Molinar (Jason Carter).

During the attempted capture Dr. Hirsch (James Kiberd) is killed by the vampire. A replacement doctor, Dr. Joe McKay (Garett Maggart) takes his place in the group. Out of the entire group Dr. Joe McKay is the first to treat the vampire like a person and not just as something to be studied. The group sets about a series of tests and experiments to study the vampire. As the experiments become crueler Dr. Joe McKay is left to wonder who is the true monster? The vampire or the very people he works for?

Unbeknownst to Dr. Mckay is that one of his superiors, Dr. Bassett (Jack Donner) has found out that Dr. McKay is one of the rare few who has the genetic predisposition to being able to be turned into a vampire. Dr. Bassett (without the rest of the team's knowledge) even provides Simon Molinar with a live victim. Dr. Bassett, himself, discarded the body. When the body is found this gains the attention of the local police. The group decides to destroy Simon Molinar once their experiments are finished but Dr. Bassett thinks it might be best to create a new vampire, one that has never killed before, to replace the vampire they intend to destroy.

Bassett locked Dr. McKay in a room with the vampire but Simon escaped instead of turning Dr. McKay into a vampire. During his escape Simon ripped the caduceus necklace from Dr. McKay's neck. It's a necklace that Dr. McKay never takes off and wore as a sign of healing and his Hippocratic oath. Simon Molinar stole this as a memento because of his growing fondness for Dr. McKay despite having been his prisoner.

== Novel differences ==
The novel for Demon Under Glass, written by Deborah L. Warner (as D. L. Warner), was published the same year as the film's release. About two thirds of the novel is the same story as the film however the novel continues after Molinar's escape.

After Simon Molinar escaped Dr. McKay is reassigned. Two years pass. Dr. McKay lives a normal life and even has a fiancé. One evening Simon Molinar comes to retrieve Dr. McKay, bypassing his new high tech security system and risking his own life. Simon reveals to Dr. McKay that The Delphi Project is not dead. They were monitoring Dr. McKay for two years before deciding to proceed in an experiment using a serum created from Simon's blood samples. Their plan was to transform Dr. McKay into a vampire.

Dr. McKay's whole life for two years had been a lie. Even his fiancé had been a government agent involved in the project without him knowing it. Simon Molinar and Dr. McKay go on the run together in a desperate bid to stop the evil plan to create laboratory-made vampires.
