= Maggard =

Maggard may refer to:

- Maggard, Kentucky, a community in Magoffin County
- Dave Maggard (born 1940), American athlete
- John "Slo" Maggard, American musician

== See also ==
- Cledus Maggard & the Citizen's Band
- Maggart, a surname
