= Art Carney =

American actor and comedian (1918–2003)

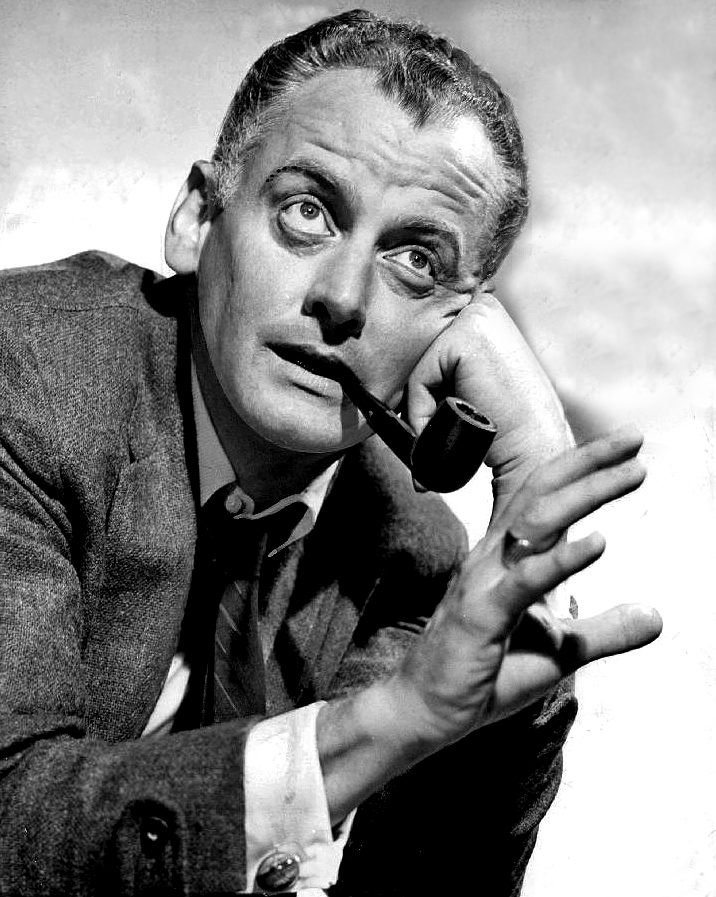
- Carney in 1959
- Born: Arthur William Matthew Carney; November 4, 1918; Mount Vernon, New York, U.S.
- Died: November 9, 2003 (aged 85); Chester, Connecticut, U.S.
- Resting place: Riverside Cemetery, Old Saybrook, Connecticut, U.S.
- Occupations: Actor; comedian
- Years active: 1939–1993
- Spouses: Jean Myers (m. 1940; div. 1965) (m. 1980) Barbara Isaac (m. 1966; div. 1977)
- Children: 3
- Family: Devin Carney (grandson) Reeve Carney (grand-nephew)
- Military career
- Allegiance: United States
- Branch: United States Army
- Service years: 1943–1945
- Rank: Private
- Unit: 28th Infantry Division
- Conflicts: World War II: Battle of Normandy
- Awards: Purple Heart; American Campaign Medal; European–African–Middle Eastern Campaign Medal; World War II Victory Medal

Arthur William Matthew Carney (November 4, 1918 – November 9, 2003) was an American actor and comedian. A recipient of an Academy Award, a Golden Globe Award, and six Primetime Emmy Awards, he was best known for his role as Ed Norton on the sitcom The Honeymooners (1955–1956).

His film roles include Harry and Tonto (1974), for which he won the Academy Award for Best Actor, The Late Show (1977), House Calls (1978), Going in Style (1979), Firestarter, The Muppets Take Manhattan (both 1984), and Last Action Hero (1993).

== Early life ==
Carney, the youngest of six sons (his brothers were Jack, Ned, Robert, Fred, and Phil), was born in Mount Vernon, New York, the son of Helen (née Farrell) and Edward Michael Carney, a newspaperman and publicist. His family was Irish American and Catholic. He attended A.B. Davis High School.

Carney was drafted into the United States Army in 1943 as an infantryman and machine gun crewman during World War II. During the Battle of Normandy serving in the 28th Infantry Division, he was wounded in the leg by shrapnel and walked with a limp for the rest of his life. As a result of the injury, his right leg was ¾-inch (2 cm) shorter than his left. Carney was awarded a Purple Heart, the American Campaign Medal, the European–African–Middle Eastern Campaign Medal and the World War II Victory Medal, and was discharged as a private in 1945.

== Career ==
=== Radio ===
Carney was a comic singer with the Horace Heidt orchestra, which was heard often on radio during the 1930s, notably on the hugely successful Pot o' Gold, the first big-money giveaway show in 1939–1941. Carney's film career began with an uncredited role in Pot o' Gold (1941), the radio program's spin-off feature film, playing a member of Heidt's band. Carney, a gifted mimic, worked steadily in radio during the 1940s, playing character roles and impersonating celebrities such as President Franklin D. Roosevelt and Winston Churchill. He can be seen impersonating Roosevelt in a 1937 promotional film for Stewart-Warner refrigerators that is preserved by the Library of Congress. as well as during a 1966 appearance as a Mystery Guest on What's My Line. In 1941, he was the house comic on the big band remote series Matinee at Meadowbrook.

One of his radio roles during the 1940s was the first Red Lantern on Land of the Lost. In 1943 he played Billy Oldham on Joe and Ethel Turp, based on Damon Runyon stories. He appeared on The Henry Morgan Show in 1946–47. He impersonated Roosevelt on The March of Time and Dwight D. Eisenhower on Living 1948. In 1950–51 he played Montague's father on The Magnificent Montague. He was a supporting player on Casey, Crime Photographer and Gang Busters.

=== Television ===
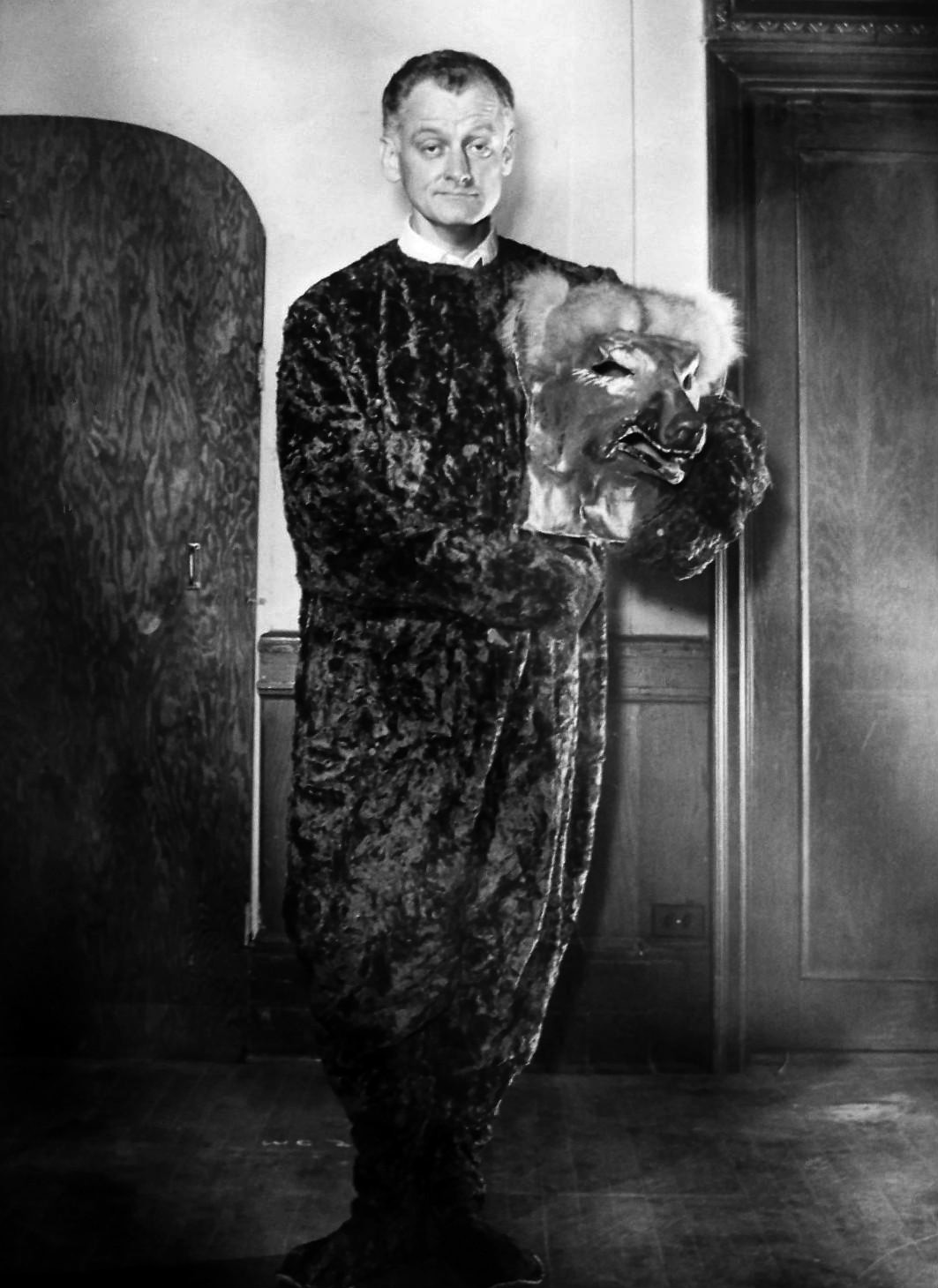
Carney on his variety show Art Carney Special (1959)

On both the radio and television versions of The Morey Amsterdam Show (1948–50), Carney's character Charlie the doorman became known for his catchphrase, "Ya know what I mean?".

In 1950, Jackie Gleason was starring in the New York–based comedy-variety series Cavalcade of Stars and played many different characters. Gleason's regular characters included Charlie Bratten, a lunchroom loudmouth who insisted on spoiling a neighboring patron's meal. Carney, established in New York as a reliable actor, played Bratten's mild-mannered victim, Clem Finch. Gleason and Carney developed a good working chemistry, and Gleason recruited Carney to appear in other sketches, including the domestic-comedy skits featuring The Honeymooners. Carney gained lifelong fame for his portrayal of sewer worker Ed Norton, opposite Jackie Gleason's bus driver, Ralph Kramden. The success of these skits resulted in the famous situation comedy The Honeymooners and the Honeymooners revivals that followed. He was nominated for seven Emmy Awards and won six.

Between his stints with Gleason, Carney worked steadily as a character actor and occasionally in musical-variety. He guest-starred on NBC's Henry Morgan's Great Talent Hunt (1951), The Dinah Shore Chevy Show, and many others, including as a mystery guest four times on What's My Line?, dressed as Ed Norton for his first appearance. Carney also had his own NBC television variety show from 1959 to 1960.

In 1958, he starred in an ABC children's television special Art Carney Meets Peter and the Wolf, which featured the Bil Baird Marionettes. It combined an original story with a marionette presentation of Serge Prokofiev's Peter and the Wolf. Some of Prokofiev's other music was given lyrics written by Ogden Nash. The special was a success and was repeated twice.

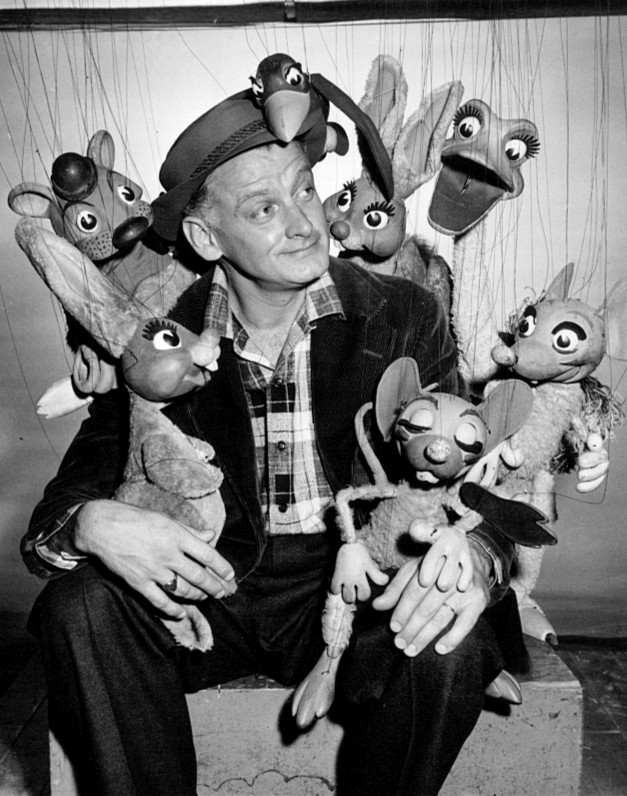
Art Carney surrounded by several marionettes from his television special, Art Carney Meets Peter and the Wolf (1958)

Carney starred in a Christmas episode of The Twilight Zone, "The Night of the Meek", playing a dramatic turn as an alcoholic department store Santa Claus who later becomes the real thing. In 1964, he guest-starred in the episode "Smelling Like a Rose" along with Hal March and Tina Louise in the CBS drama Mr. Broadway, starring Craig Stevens. In the season two opening episodes 35 and 36 of the Batman television series, titled "Shoot a Crooked Arrow" and "Walk the Straight and Narrow" (1966), Carney performed as the newly introduced villain "The Archer". In 1967, he was originally cast as Geppetto for the Hallmark adaption of Pinocchio, but illness prevented him from appearing when taping time arrived. He was later replaced by Burl Ives.

In 1970, Carney appeared as Skeet in "The Men from Shiloh" (the rebranded name of The Virginian) in the episode titled "With Love, Bullets and Valentines." In the early 1970s, Carney sang and danced on several episodes of The Dean Martin Show, took part in the Dean Martin Celebrity Roast of his old co-star Jackie Gleason, and appeared as both Santa Claus and his wannabe kidnapper Cosmo Scam in the 1970 Muppets TV special The Great Santa Claus Switch. He was also a guest star on The Carol Burnett Show in January 1971.

He starred as Police Chief Paul Lanigan in the 1976 television film Lanigan's Rabbi, and in the short-lived series of the same name that aired in 1977 as part of the NBC Sunday Mystery Movie lineup.

In 1978, Carney appeared in Star Wars Holiday Special, a television film that was linked to the Star Wars film series. In it, he played Trader Saun Dann, a member of the Rebel Alliance who helped Chewbacca and his family evade an Imperial blockade. The same year, he appeared as the father of Ringo Starr's alter ego "Ognir Rrats" in the made for television special Ringo, and on an episode of Alice.

In 1980, he starred in the TV film Alcatraz: The Whole Shocking Story. In 1984, he portrayed Santa Claus in the holiday television film The Night They Saved Christmas.

Among his final television roles were a series of commercials for Coca-Cola in which he played a man enjoying a day out with his grandson played by actor Brian Bonsall, including a famous Christmas commercial based around the famous Rockefeller Center Christmas tree in New York.

=== Recordings ===
Carney recorded prolifically in the 1950s for Columbia Records. Two of his hits were "The Song of the Sewer", sung in character as Norton, and "'Twas the Night Before Christmas", a spoken-word record in which Carney, accompanied only by a jazz drummer, recited the famous Yuletide poem in syncopation. Some of Carney's recordings were comedy-novelty songs, but most were silly songs intended especially for children.

He also narrated a version of The Wizard of Oz for Golden Records, with Mitch Miller and his chorus performing four of the songs from the 1939 film version.

He called playing the piano "his first love" during an appearance on The Tonight Show.

=== Films ===
Carney won the Academy Award for Best Actor for his 1974 performance as Harry Coombes, an elderly man going on the road with his pet cat, in Harry and Tonto. Other nominees that year were Albert Finney, Dustin Hoffman, Jack Nicholson, and Al Pacino. It was presented to him at the 47th Academy Awards on April 8, 1975, by actress Glenda Jackson, with whom Carney went on to co-star in the comedy House Calls in 1978. Carney also won a Golden Globe award for his performance in Harry and Tonto.

In demand in Hollywood after that, Carney then appeared in W.W. and the Dixie Dancekings (as a deranged preacher), The Late Show (as an aging detective), House Calls (as a senile chief surgeon), Movie Movie (in multiple roles), and Going in Style (as a bored senior citizen who joins in on bank robberies). Later films included The Muppets Take Manhattan, the crime drama The Naked Face, and the sci-fi thriller Firestarter.

In 1981, he portrayed Harry R. Truman, an 83-year-old lodge owner, in the semi-fictional account of events leading to the eruption of Mount St. Helens in St. Helens.

In 1990, he co-starred in the film Where Pigeons Go to Die with Michael Landon. He played the role of a grandfather who taught his grandson life lessons that would follow him for the rest of his life.

His final film role was in the 1993 action comedy film Last Action Hero.

=== Broadway ===
Carney made his Broadway debut in 1957 as the lead in The Rope Dancers with Siobhán McKenna, a drama by Morton Wishengrad. His subsequent Broadway appearances included his portrayal in 1965–1967 of Felix Unger in The Odd Couple (opposite Walter Matthau and then Jack Klugman as Oscar). The character was played by Jack Lemmon in the 1968 film version. In 1969 he was nominated for a Tony Award for his performance in Brian Friel's Lovers. In 1961–1962, Carney played Frank Michaelson in an English comedy by Phoebe and Henry Ephron titled Take Her, She's Mine with Phyllis Thaxter as his co-star in the Biltmore Theatre in New York; the character was played by James Stewart in the 1963 film version.

== Personal life ==
Carney was married three times to two women. In 1940, he married his high school sweetheart Jean Myers, with whom he had three children, Eileen, Brian and Paul, before divorcing in 1965. In 1966, Carney married production assistant Barbara Isaac; they divorced in 1977. After his divorce from Isaac, he reunited with Myers, and they remarried in 1980 and remained together until his death. His grandson is Connecticut state representative Devin Carney and his great-nephew is musician and actor Reeve Carney.

According to Carney, he was an alcoholic by his late teens. His stage partner, comedian Ollie O'Toole, "would order gin and grapefruit juice for us in the morning and, gee, it was great." Carney later used barbiturates, amphetamines, and alcohol substitutes. To battle his addiction, which he said ran in the family, he tried psychotherapy and joined Alcoholics Anonymous. He finally found success with Antabuse and quit drinking during the filming of Harry and Tonto.

Carney died at a nursing home in Chester, Connecticut, on November 9, 2003. He is interred at Riverside Cemetery in Old Saybrook, Connecticut. Jean Carney died on October 31, 2012, at the age of 93.

== Filmography ==
| Year | Title | Role | Notes |
|---|---|---|---|
| 1941 | Pot o' Gold | Band member / Radio Announcer | Uncredited |
| 1949-50 | Morey Amsterdam Show | | |
| 1950 | PM Picnic | The Narrator | |
| 1955–56 | The Honeymooners | Ed Norton | Primetime Emmy Award for Best Actor in a Supporting Role (1956) |
| 1958 | Alfred Hitchcock Presents | Cyril T. Jones | Episode: "Safety for the Witness" |
| 1960 | The Twilight Zone | Henry Corwin | Episode: "The Night of the Meek" |
| 1964 | The Yellow Rolls-Royce | Joey Friedlander | |
| 1967 | A Guide for the Married Man | "Joe X", Married Man | |
| 1972 | The Snoop Sisters: 'Female Instinct' | Barney | with Helen Hayes and Mildred Natwick |
| 1974 | Harry and Tonto | Harry Coombes | Academy Award for Best Actor; Golden Globe Award for Best Actor in a Motion Picture – Musical or Comedy |
| 1975 | W.W. and the Dixie Dancekings | Deacon John Wesley Gore | |
| 1975 | Death Scream | Mr. Jacobs | TV movie (aka Street Kill) |
| 1975 | Katherine | Thornton Alman | TV movie Nominated—Primetime Emmy Award for Outstanding Single Performance by a Supporting Actor in Comedy or Drama Special |
| 1976 | Won Ton Ton, the Dog Who Saved Hollywood | J.J. Fromberg | |
| 1977 | The Late Show | Ira Wells | National Society of Film Critics Award for Best Actor |
| 1977 | Scott Joplin | John Stark | |
| 1978 | House Calls | Dr. Amos Willoughby | |
| 1978 | Movie Movie | Dr. Blaine / Dr. Bowers | Segments: "Dynamite Hands" and "Baxter's Beauties of 1933" |
| 1978 | Star Wars Holiday Special | Trader Saun Dann | |
| 1979 | Ravagers | Sergeant | |
| 1979 | You Can't Take It With You | Grandpa Martin Vanderhof | |
| 1979 | Steel | "Pignose" Moran | |
| 1979 | Sunburn | Marcus | |
| 1979 | Going in Style | Al | Pasinetti Award for Best Actor |
| 1980 | Defiance | Abe | |
| 1980 | Roadie | Corpus C. Redfish | |
| 1980 | Alcatraz: The Whole Shocking Story | Robert Stroud | TV movie |
| 1980 | Fighting Back: The Rocky Bleier Story | Art Rooney | TV movie |
| 1981 | Bitter Harvest | Walter Peary | TV movie |
| 1981 | Take This Job and Shove It | Charlie Pickett | |
| 1981 | St. Helens | Harry Truman | |
| 1981 | The Leprechauns' Christmas Gold | The Narrator / Blarney Kilakilarney | TV movie, Voice |
| 1982 | Better Late Than Never | Charley Dunbar | |
| 1983 | The Last Leaf | Mr. Behrman | |
| 1984 | Terrible Joe Moran | Tony | TV movie Primetime Emmy Award for Outstanding Supporting Actor in a Limited Series or a Special |
| 1984 | Firestarter | Irv Manders | |
| 1984 | The Naked Face | Morgens | |
| 1984 | The Muppets Take Manhattan | Bernard Crawford | |
| 1984 | The Night They Saved Christmas | Santa Claus | TV movie |
| 1985 | The Undergrads | Mel Adler | |
| 1985 | Izzy and Moe | Moe Smith | TV movie |
| 1985 | The Blue Yonder | Henry Coogan | TV movie |
| 1986 | Miracle of the Heart: A Boys Town Story | Father Michael T. O'Halloran | |
| 1987 | Night Friend | Monsignor O'Brien | |
| 1990 | Where Pigeons Go to Die | Da | Nominated—Primetime Emmy Award for Outstanding Lead Actor in a Miniseries or a Special |
| 1993 | Last Action Hero | Frank | Final film role |

== Awards and nominations ==
| Year | Award | Category | Nominated work | Result | Ref. |
|---|---|---|---|---|---|
| 1974 | Academy Awards | Best Actor | Harry and Tonto | Won | |
| 1990 | American Comedy Awards | Lifetime Achievement Award – Male | | Won | |
| 1985 | CableACE Awards | Actor in a Movie or Miniseries | The Undergrads | Won | |
| 1987 | CableACE Awards | Actor in a Comedy Series | Faerie Tale Theatre (for "The Emperor's New Clothes") | Nominated | |
| 1974 | Golden Globe Awards | Best Actor in a Motion Picture – Musical or Comedy | Harry and Tonto | Won | |
| 1977 | National Society of Film Critics Awards | Best Actor | The Late Show | Won | |
| 1954 | Primetime Emmy Awards | Best Series Supporting Actor | The Jackie Gleason Show | Won | |
| 1955 | Primetime Emmy Awards | Best Supporting Actor in a Regular Series | The Jackie Gleason Show | Won | |
| 1956 | Primetime Emmy Awards | Best Actor in a Supporting Role | The Honeymooners | Won | |
| 1956 | Primetime Emmy Awards | Best Comedian | | Nominated | |
| 1957 | Primetime Emmy Awards | Best Supporting Performance by an Actor | The Jackie Gleason Show | Nominated | |
| 1966 | Primetime Emmy Awards | Special Classification of Individual Achievements | The Jackie Gleason Show | Nominated | |
| 1967 | Primetime Emmy Awards | Special Classification of Individual Achievements | The Jackie Gleason Show | Won | |
| 1968 | Primetime Emmy Awards | Special Classification of Individual Achievements | The Jackie Gleason Show | Won (Note: Tied with Pat Paulsen for The Smothers Brothers Comedy Hour.) | |
| 1976 | Primetime Emmy Awards | Outstanding Single Performance by a Supporting Actor in Comedy or Drama Special | Katherine | Nominated | |
| 1984 | Primetime Emmy Awards | Outstanding Supporting Actor in a Limited Series or a Special | Terrible Joe Moran | Won | |
| 1987 | Primetime Emmy Awards | Outstanding Guest Performer in a Comedy Series | The Cavanaughs (for "He Ain't Heavy") | Nominated | |
| 1990 | Primetime Emmy Awards | Outstanding Lead Actor in a Miniseries or a Special | Where Pigeons Go to Die | Nominated | |
| 2004 | Television Hall of Fame | Hall of Fame Award | | Inducted | |
| 1969 | Tony Awards | Best Leading Actor in a Play | Lovers | Nominated | |
| 2003 | TV Land Awards | Favorite Second Banana | The Honeymooners | Nominated | |
| 1980 | Venice Film Festival | Best Actor (Pasinetti Award) | Going in Style | Won | |

=== Honors and tributes ===
- Art Carney has a star on the Hollywood Walk of Fame in the Television Category at 6627 Hollywood Boulevard, awarded on February 8, 1960.
- In 1954, the board of directors of the Florida Water and Sewage Works Operators Association (now the Florida Water and Pollution Control Operators Association) unanimously passed a resolution that Carney be granted an Honorary Life Membership in the Association in recognition for his constant humorous reminders to the American public that sewage systems exist.
- While he was starring in The Odd Couple on Broadway, Carney's caricature was drawn on the walls of Sardi's Restaurant.
- In 2002, Carney was portrayed by Michael Chieffo in Gleason, a 2002 television biopic about the life of his Honeymooners co-star Jackie Gleason.
- In 2004, Carney was posthumously inducted into the Television Hall of Fame.
- Jackie Gleason stated that Carney deserved ninety percent of the credit for the success of The Honeymooners.
- The city of Yonkers, New York, named the corner of Margaret Ave. and Westchester Ave. as Art Carney Place, because Carney once lived in the city.

== In popular culture ==
- Carney is referenced twice in the song "Celebrity Art Party" by American band The Embarrassment.
- In 1994, the music group The Swirling Eddies named a song after Carney on their album Zoom Daddy titled "Art Carney's Dream."
