= Johnny Bago =

- Genre: Comedy
- Created by: Jeffrey Price; Peter S. Seaman; Robert Zemeckis
- Starring: Peter Dobson; Rose Abdoo; Anna Berger; Richard Romanus; Timothy Stack; Michael V. Gazzo
- Theme music composer: Jimmy Buffett
- Composer: Phil Marshall
- Country of origin: United States
- Original language: English
- No. of seasons: 1
- No. of episodes: 8 (2 unaired)

Production
- Executive producers: Frank Marshall; Jeffrey Price; Peter S. Seaman; Steve Starkey; Robert Zemeckis
- Producer: Hal Galli
- Running time: 42 minutes
- Production companies: Chicago Five Productions; Papazian-Hirsch Entertainment; Universal Television

Original release
- Network: CBS
- Release: June 25 – July 30, 1993

Johnny Bago is an American comedy television series created by Jeffrey Price, Peter S. Seaman and Robert Zemeckis. The series stars Peter Dobson, Rose Abdoo, Anna Berger, Richard Romanus, Timothy Stack and Michael V. Gazzo. The series aired on CBS from June 25, 1993, to July 30, 1993.

== Plot ==
After being framed for a mob murder, ex-con John Tenuti stows away in a retiree's Winnebago and adopts the alias Johnny Bago.

== Cast ==
- Peter Dobson as Johnny Bago
- Rose Abdoo as Beverly Florio
- Anna Berger as Ma Tenuti
- Richard Romanus as Vinnie
- Timothy Stack as various news reporters§
- Michael V. Gazzo as Don Roselli
- Art LaFleur as Captain Lemsky
- Barry Shabaka Henley as Detective Venezia

§ In a running gag, whenever an on-air local news report was about Bago's latest sighting, or somehow involved Johnny, the news reporter delivering the update would be played by Timothy Stack. Each reporter had a different name, station affiliation, wardrobe, look, etc.

== Episodes ==
No.	Title	Directed by	Written by	Original release date
1	"Johnny Bago Free at Last"	Robert Zemeckis	Story by : Jeffrey Price, Peter S. Seaman & Robert Zemeckis; Teleplay by : Jeffrey Price & Peter S. Seaman	June 25, 1993
2	"Hail the Conquering Marrow"	Allan Arkush	Jule Selbo & Trish Soodik	July 2, 1993
3	"Johnny's Manly Act"	Frank Marshall	John Warren	July 9, 1993
4	"Johnny's Golden Shaft"	Bryan Spicer	Jeffrey Price & Peter S. Seaman	July 16, 1993
5	"Big Top Bago"	Oz Scott	Robert Ramsey & Matthew Stone	July 23, 1993
6	"Lady Madonna"	Peter Markle	Terrel Seltzer	July 30, 1993
7	"Spotting Elvis"	Oz Scott	Terrel Seltzer	Unaired
8	"Johnny Saves the World"	N/A	N/A	Unaired
