= Maude Maggart =

American singer (born 1975)

- Born: Amber Maude McAfee-Maggart; February 24, 1975 (age 51); Manhattan, New York, United States
- Genres: Cabaret
- Occupation: Singer
- Instrument: vocals
- Years active: 2003–present
- Label: Unsigned
- Website: www.maudemaggart.com

Maude Amber McAfee-Maggart (born February 24, 1975) is an American cabaret singer and recording artist who performs throughout the United States and Europe, but most often in Los Angeles, San Francisco, and New York City.

== Biography ==
Maggart was born in New York City to Broadway veterans Brandon Maggart and Diane McAfee and is the sister of singer/songwriter Fiona Apple. Growing up going by the name Amber, she changed her stage name at the age of 20 to Maude, after her paternal great-grandmother, Maude Apple.

Maggart's brother, Garett Maggart, starred in the TV series The Sentinel. In addition, her maternal grandparents were Millicent Greene, a dancer with the George White's Scandals, a series of 1920s musical revues similar to the Ziegfeld Follies, and Johnny McAfee, a multireedist and vocalist of the big band era. Her grandparents met while touring with Johnny Hamp and his Orchestra. She went to the Fiorello H. LaGuardia High School of Music & Art and Performing Arts, in New York City. Her 2001 cabaret debut in Los Angeles prompted critic Les Traub to write that she is "destined to become a major cabaret star."

== Discography ==
=== Albums ===
Studio albums

- Look for the Silver Lining (2003)
- With Sweet Despair (2005)
- Maude Maggart Sings Irving Berlin (2005)
- Dreamland (2008) with Brent Spiner
- The Word (2017) with Manu Lafer

Live albums

- Maude Maggart Sings 1920's Broadway (2002)
- Maude Maggart Live (2007)
- Here Come The Dreamers (2017) limited edition release - only 100 copies (CDs) pressed

- Johnny Mercer: The Dream's on Me, Television special, 2009 (Turner). On the associated album 'Clint Eastwood Presents: Johnny Mercer "The Dream's On Me" - A Celebration of His Music', Maude sings "Skylark" with Jamie Cullum
- "Finding Words for Spring" with Ray Jessel on his 2009 album Naughty or Nice
- "Find Your Song", "Not the Star You Thought I'd Be" with David Lucky on his 2011 album Kill 'em with Kindness
- A Prairie Home Companion (NPR)
- Fiona Apple's The Idler Wheel... on the track "Hot Knife" (2012)
- "Newspaper" (as Maude Maggart) and "Ladies" (as Maude Maggart) from Fiona Apple's 2020 album "Fetch the Bolt Cutters", early press releases credited Amber Maggart (her real name) as background vocals
- "While There Is Still Time" - honouring frontline medical workers during the COVID-19 pandemic (music by Michele Brourman, lyrics by Hillary Rollins) (April 2020)
