= Garett Maggart =

American actor (born 1969)

- Born: May 24, 1969 (age 56)
- Children: 1
- Father: Brandon Maggart
- Relatives: Fiona Apple (half-sister); Maude Maggart (half-sister)

Garett Maggart (born May 24, 1969) is an American actor. He is the son of fellow actor Brandon Maggart and half brother of singers Fiona Apple and Maude Maggart. He and his wife, Cynthia, have one son.

== Filmography ==
=== Film ===
Year	Title	Role	Notes
1982	The World According to Garp	Kid	Uncredited
2002	Demon Under Glass	Dr. Joseph McKay	Direct-to-video
2007	Because I Said So	Contractor / Carpenter	Uncredited
2010	Vampire	Joe McKay	

=== Television ===
Year	Title	Role	Notes
1988	Brothers	Pizza Man	Episode: "Moving Out"
1995	Frasier	Bruce	Episode: "Roz in the Doghouse"
1996–1999	The Sentinel	Blair Sandburg	65 episodes
2002	ER	Lt. Ottenson	Episode: "First Snowfall"
2004	Days of Our Lives	Radar Operator	Episode #1.9844
2008	CSI: Miami	Michael Maddox	Episode: "Down to the Wire"
2009	Doc West	Johnny	Television film
