= Katherine (film) =

- DVD cover
- Genre: Drama
- Written by: Jeremy Kagan
- Directed by: Jeremy Kagan
- Starring: Sissy Spacek; Art Carney; Henry Winkler; Julie Kavner
- Country of origin: United States
- Original language: English

Production
- Producer: Gerald I. Isenberg
- Production locations: Old Tucson - 201 S. Kinney Road, Tucson, Arizona; Tucson Mountains; Sonoran Desert; Los Angeles; San Francisco; Tucson, Arizona
- Cinematography: Frank Stanley
- Editor: Patrick Kennedy
- Running time: 97 min.
- Production company: The Jozak Company

Original release
- Network: ABC
- Release: October 5, 1975

Katherine (also known as The Radical) is a 1975 American TV movie written and directed by Jeremy Kagan, and starring Sissy Spacek, Art Carney and Henry Winkler. Intended to portray the time period of the Vietnam War, the title character was loosely based on Diana Oughton of the Weather Underground, who died in the 1970 Greenwich Village townhouse explosion when a bomb she was building accidentally exploded. Reviewers have also noted that Katherine also "borrowed from the then-current headlines involving Patty Hearst, another heiress whose exact level of voluntary involvement with the Symbionese Liberation Army remained hazy in 1975.

Through a series of flashbacks, the film, told in semi-documentary fashion, retraces the main characters' lives through the years 1964–1972.

Katherine originally aired in a two-hour time slot on October 5, 1975, and later was syndicated in a 78-minute version.
