= The Sentinel (TV series) =

Action crime drama series

- From left to right: Simon Banks (Bruce A. Young), Jim Ellison (Richard Burgi), and Blair Sandburg (Garett Maggart)
- Genre: Crime; Fantasy; Action; Thriller; Adventure
- Created by: Danny Bilson; Paul De Meo
- Written by: Danny Bilson; Paul De Meo; Gail Morgan Hickman; Harold Apter; Laurence Frank
- Starring: Richard Burgi; Garett Maggart; Bruce A. Young; Kelly Curtis; Anna Galvin
- Theme music composer: James Newton Howard
- Composer: Steve Porcaro
- Countries of origin: United States; Canada
- No. of seasons: 4
- No. of episodes: 65 (list of episodes)

Production
- Executive producers: Danny Bilson; Paul De Meo
- Producer: Gail Morgan Hickman
- Running time: approx. 45 mins
- Production companies: Pet Fly Productions; Paramount Network Television

Original release
- Network: UPN
- Release: March 20, 1996 – May 24, 1999

The Sentinel is an action/thriller/crime drama series that aired on UPN in the United States from March 20, 1996, to May 24, 1999. It ran for 65 episodes over four seasons. The series later re-aired on Syfy.

== Synopsis ==
Jim Ellison was a US Army Ranger who spent 18 months in the Peruvian jungle after the rest of his unit was killed. He developed hyperacute senses from surviving in the wild, but repressed them when he returned to civilization. His sensory abilities re-manifested five years later, while conducting an extended stakeout in the forest as a detective in the Major Crimes Unit of the Cascade, Washington, police department. He went to a hospital for an examination where he met Blair Sandburg, an anthropologist from Rainier University, whom Ellison initially mistook for a physician. Upon hearing Ellison's story, Sandburg declares that Ellison is a "Sentinel": in ancient tribes, Sentinels used their enhanced senses to protect their village. For Jim, Cascade is his village. Blair had been studying Sentinel mythology for years. While he found many individuals with one or two hyperactive senses, he had never before found a person with all five senses enhanced, a "true" Sentinel.

Blair helps Jim control his senses and joins Jim as a police observer. Their unlikely partnership works, and together they fight crime in the streets of Cascade. The only person aside from Sandburg who knows Jim's secret is his captain and friend, Simon Banks.

=== Pilot ===
Jim initially doesn't believe Blair's explanation about his senses. At their second meeting, Jim throws Blair against a wall. Nevertheless, Jim's senses pose a huge problem, as demonstrated when Blair has to shove Jim and himself under an oncoming garbage truck to save Jim from a zone-out. Jim later introduces Blair to Simon Banks, the chief of Major Crimes, and secures Blair a ninety-day observer's pass to help with his senses. The excuse they give is that Blair is Jim's kid cousin, whom he is helping get his doctorate by allowing him to study the police force so he can write a dissertation on the "thin blue line" and the closed society of the police force.

Soon after, Blair's warehouse apartment is blown up by the drug lab next door, and Jim invites Blair to stay with him at his loft apartment at 852 Prospect Ave., apartment 307. Blair temporarily brings Larry the Ape, the subject of a short-term sociology study. Although the arrangement is only meant to last a week, Blair stays for years.

=== Seasons 1–3 ===
On the job, Jim constantly reminds his wayward "partner" to stay in the truck, although Blair rarely listens. Also, Blair is often the victim of kidnapping and abuse by various criminals. Blair also steadily serves to complete Jim's paperwork and soothe Jim's temper. The other detectives at Major Crimes think of him fondly, and Blair has many nicknames: "Chief" from Jim, "Hairboy" from Rafe and Henri, and "Sandy" from Megan Connor.

=== Season 4 ===
At the end of season three, Blair meets a new sentinel, Ms Alex Barnes (Jeri Ryan), and agrees to help her with her senses. Jim has a "nightmare" (actually a vision) about killing Blair, and is haunted by apparent hallucinations (actually more visions) of Barnes' spirit animal, a spotted panther. At this point, Blair has not informed Jim about the new Sentinel in town, leaving Jim confused about the Sentinel instincts he's experiencing. Uncertain about the situation, Jim throws Blair out of the loft. Subsequently, Alex attacks Blair and kills him. Following Blair's pronouncement of death, Jim employs the power of his animal spirit to bring Blair back to life. Despite this, Jim is haunted by spirit visions of Alex and struggles with a strange attraction to her, leading to a kiss between them in front of Blair. Eventually, Jim regains control over his Sentinel urges. Alex, now left catatonic due to experimenting with a drug meant to enhance her Sentinel abilities, is confined to a mental institution, and Blair returns to the loft.

The last episode of the series, "The Sentinel by Blair Sandburg", shows Blair finally finishing his dissertation. He is promised to allow Jim to read the paper before he turns it in, but his mother shows up at the loft, snoops on his computer, and emails the document to Sid Graham, a big-shot publisher in New York. Sid releases snippets of Blair's Sentinel paper to the press and the general public, who then hound Jim and Blair. To repair his relationship with his friend and fix his wrongdoing, Blair rejects a three-million-dollar publishing contract at a press conference where he declares his dissertation fraudulent, thus destroying his academic career. At the end of this last episode, Jim and Simon offer Blair a place in Major Crimes as a police officer should he choose to accept it.

== Episodes ==
Season	Episodes	Originally released	
Season	Episodes	First released	Last released
1	10	March 20, 1996	July 17, 1996
2	24	September 4, 1996	May 21, 1997
3	23	September 10, 1997	May 20, 1998
4	8	February 1, 1999	May 24, 1999

== Cast ==
=== Main ===
- Richard Burgi as Detective Jim Ellison
- Garett Maggart as Blair Sandburg
- Bruce A. Young as Captain Simon Banks
- Kelly Curtis as Lieutenant Carolyn Plummer (season 1)

=== Recurring ===
- Anna Galvin as Megan Connor
- Ken Earl as Bomb Squad Captain Joel Taggert
- Henri Brown as Detective Brown
- Ryf Van Rij as Detective Rafe

== Characters ==
=== Jim Ellison ===
Jim Ellison was born with hyperactive senses. During his childhood, he had a friend named Bud who helped him with said senses, but was murdered at some point. His mother also left, leaving him to live with his extremely wealthy father, William Ellison, and his brother, Steven Ellison. Jim's relationship with both characters is notably strained, and leads to both the repression of his senses and his joining the Army.

While in the Army, Jim achieves the rank of captain in the US Army Rangers/Special Forces, working covert ops. His last mission (for 7th group special forces - ODA 731) takes him and his team of seven to Peru to stop a drug-smuggling campaign, but his ranking officer was corrupt and set him and his men up for failure. His helicopter crashes, killing his seven men and leaving him wounded. He is taken in by the Chopec, an elusive and secretive tribe in Peru, and learns to control his senses for the tribe's betterment under the tutelage of Incacha, the tribe's shaman, who calls Jim "Enqueri" ("Sentinel"). The following year, when a satellite photo shows seven tombstones at the helicopter's crash site instead of just a pile of scrap metal, the US Army sends in a team to find the sole survivor of the crash and bring him back home.

During the series, in flashbacks of Jim's military time, his various military awards and badges were shown on his military uniform. For example, in Season 2 episode "Secrets", Jim's Silver Star medal is shown. Additionally in the pilot, Jim is shown to be wearing a Combat Infantryman Badge and the Parachutist Breast Badge on his uniform. In Season 4 episode "Dead End on Blank Street", Jim is also shown to be wearing a Combat Medic Breast Badge.

When Jim returns to Cascade, Washington, he represses the memories of his time in Peru. Nevertheless, his instincts as a Sentinel remain, leading him to "serve and protect" his "tribe", the residents of Cascade, by joining the police force. Eventually assigned to Vice, he is mentored by Jack Pendergrast, who helps Jim tame his temper and his rebellious attitude. Jim later marries Carolyn Plummer, another detective on the force. Jack then dies, and Carolyn and Jim divorce.

After a solitary week-long stakeout in a remote woodland location, Jim's senses begin to re-emerge, focusing primarily on his sight and hearing. Upon his return to the city, his enhanced senses fully manifest, causing disorientation, stress, and a drugged feeling. He can perceive sights, sounds, and smells beyond ordinary human capability, has an aversion to flavorful foods, and experiences discomfort with any slightly coarse materials. Jim opts to check himself into a hospital, where he encounters Blair Sandburg posing as Doctor McCoy (as indicated on the stolen lab coat he wears) or Doctor McKay (as he pronounces it).

During the series, Jim falls in love with a handful of women but most of them end up dying in his arms. Several of Jim's old friends from the Army and police force also end up dead during the course of the show.

==== Powers ====
Jim's hyperacute senses allow him to perceive things undetectable by normal humans. He can see perfectly in low light situations and with superb acuity at long distances, hear sounds at extremely low volume or beyond the normal range of human hearing, and sense what others cannot via taste, touch and smell; he declares himself "a walking forensic lab". Jim's powers have a drawback: if he concentrates too strongly on one sense, he may become oblivious to his immediate surroundings. Part of Blair's job is preventing this, and protecting Jim when he is focusing. As a Sentinel Jim has several powers:

- All 5 senses are strongly enhanced.
- Able to communicate with ghosts.
- Has a spirit animal, a black jaguar.
- Receives visions that guide him in the choices he makes and sometimes predict the future (Jim had a vision that showed Blair's death before Alex killed him).
- Used the power of his animal spirit to bring Blair back from the dead.

=== Blair Sandburg ===
Blair Sandburg is the genius son of Naomi Sandburg, an absolute flower child. In his youth, he was all about free love and the hippie spirit, and has yet to stop. Blair had little to no stability in his youth, always moving from home to home and never settling, but that was also what spawned his love of anthropology.

When Blair was sixteen, he moved to Cascade, Washington to begin his studies. An anthropology major, his adviser was Eli Stoddard, a major expert in the field. As he quickly moved through his education, he took many trips on grants to various parts of the globe. When he finally decided to get his doctorate, he became a teaching fellow. The topic of his dissertation was the Sentinel. This was brought about by a monograph by Sir Richard Francis Burton that described both the sentinels and their roles in their respective tribes, and their partners, accurately named by one villain: guides.

At twenty-six, Blair has an "office" in the basement at Rainier, and an $850 a month, 10,000 sq ft (930 m^{2}) warehouse apartment.

During the course of the show, Blair has several girlfriends, sometimes dating more than one woman at a time. One of his ex-girlfriends works at Cascade General, which is how he met Jim in the first place: she told him a man with complaints about all five of his senses had recently been admitted.

In Jim's visions, Blair's spirit animal is a grey wolf.

== Cancellation ==
The Sentinel was cancelled after 3 seasons by UPN, with a last episode ending with Blair's life in the balance. An intense fan campaign convinced UPN to give the series a season of eight episodes to end the series properly.

== International broadcast ==
Outside the United States, the series has been broadcast by the following stations under the following names:

Country	Name	Translation	Station
Bolivia	El centinela	The Sentinel	Bolivision
Czech Republic	Ochránce	Sentinel	TV Nova
Estonia	Tunnimees	The Watchman	TV6
Finland	Vartija	The Sentinel	Nelonen and MTV3 Scifi
France	The Sentinel		M6
Germany	Der Sentinel – Im Auge des Jägers	The Sentinel – In the Eye of the Hunter	Pro 7
Greece	Άγρυπνος Φρουρός	Sleepless Sentinel	Mega Channel
Hungary	Sentinel – Az Őrszem	The Sentinel	TV 2
Israel	סנטינל	Sentinel	AXN Israel
Italy	Sentinel		Rai Due
Kenya	The Sentinel		NTV
Latvia	Sentinels	The Sentinel	LNT
Mexico	El Centinela	The Sentinel	XHGC-TDT
Netherlands	The Sentinel		Veronica
Norway			TV 2
Philippines	The Sentinel		ABC 5
Poland	Gliniarz z dżungli	Cop from the jungle	AXN
Portugal	A Sentinela	The Sentinel	SIC
Romania	Pericol iminent	Imminent danger	Antena 1
Slovakia	Ochranca	Protector	STV, Markíza and JOJ
South Africa	The Sentinel		SABC 3
Spain	Sentinel; El Centinela	Sentinel; The Sentinel	Antena 3 Sci Fi Channel
Sweden	Spejaren	The Scout	TV4, TV4 Science Fiction
Switzerland	The Sentinel		TSI1
United Arab Emirates	The Sentinel		Showtime Arabia
Turkey	The Sentinel		aTV
United Kingdom	The Sentinel		Sci Fi Channel and Zone Thriller
Venezuela	El Centinela	The Sentinel	Radio Caracas Televisión

== Home media ==
In April 2006, CBS DVD (distributed by Paramount) released "The Complete First Season" of The Sentinel on DVD in Region 1. As of 2015, this release has been discontinued and is out of print.

Visual Entertainment released The Sentinel – The Complete Series in Region 1 on DVD in September 2015.
