= CableACE Award =

Defunct annual television award

- Awarded for: Cable television
- Country: United States
- First award: 1978
- Final award: 1997

The CableACE Award (earlier known as the ACE Awards) was an award that was given by the National Cable Television Association from 1978 to 1997 to honor excellence in American cable television programming. ACE is an acronym for "Award for Cable Excellence". The trophy itself is shaped as a glass spade, alluding to the Ace of spades.

== History ==
The CableACE was created to serve as the cable industry's counterpart to broadcast television's Primetime Emmy Awards. Until the 40th ceremony in 1988, the Emmys refused to honor cable programming. For much of its existence, the ceremony aired on a simulcast on as many as twelve cable networks in some years. The last few years found the ceremony awarded solely to one network, usually Lifetime or TBS.

In 1992, the award's official name was changed from ACE to CableACE, agreeing to do so to reduce confusion with the American Cinema Editors (ACE) society.

By 1997, the Emmys began to reach a tipping point, where cable programming had grown to hold much more critical acclaim over broadcast programming, and met an even parity, a position that would only hold for a short time before cable programming began to dominate the categories of the Primetime Emmys.

Few attended the national CableACE Awards ceremony in November 1997, and the CableACE show had a low 0.6 rating on TNT, compared with a 1.2 rating the year before, while the Emmys had a 13.5 rating that year. Smaller cable networks called for the CableACEs to be saved as their only real forum for recognition.

In April 1998, members of the NCTA chose to end the CableACEs.

== Judging ==
Professionals in the television industry were randomly selected to be judges. A Universal City hotel would be selected, where several rooms would be rented for the day. Individual rooms would be designated for each award category. Judges were discouraged from leaving the rooms at any time during the day-long judging. There were usually eight to 12 judges for each category. Depending on the submissions being presented, facilitators would play anywhere from 10 minutes per show – to the entire show – for the judges' award consideration. Judges would mark their ballots privately and were told to not discuss their selections with other judges. The awards standard tallying by a certified public accounting firm was done to keep the results of the ballot secret until the time of the announcement of the award's winner.

== Ceremonies ==
- 1985 ACE Awards
- 1995 CableACE Awards
- 1996 CableACE Awards
- 1997 CableACE Awards
