= List of awards and nominations received by Fiona Apple =

Fiona Apple awards and nominations
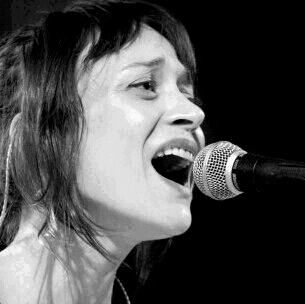
- Fiona Apple performing in 2012
Awards and nominations
Award	Wins	Nominations
Billboard Music Video Awards	1	4
California Music Awards	1	3
Esky Music Awards	1	1
Grammy Awards	3	11
MTV Video Music Awards	2	3
mtvU Woodie Awards	0	1
Shortlist Music Prize	0	1
VH1 Fashion Awards	1	2

Totals (Note: Certain award groups do not simply award one winner. They acknowledge several different recipients, have runners-up, and have third place. Since this is a specific recognition and is different from losing an award, runner-up mentions are considered wins in this award tally. For simplification and to avoid errors, each award in this list has been presumed to have had a prior nomination.)
- Wins: 23
- Nominations: 52

Fiona Apple is an American singer-songwriter. She has released five studio albums: Tidal (1996), When the Pawn... (1999), Extraordinary Machine (2005), The Idler Wheel... (2012), and Fetch the Bolt Cutters (2020). Her first two albums were released through the record labels Clean Slate Records/Work Records. Tidal reached peak positions of number fifteen on the Billboard 200 and number two on Billboard's Top Heatseekers chart. When the Pawn... peaked at number thirteen on the Billboard 200. Apple's third and fourth albums were released through Epic Records and continued to reach higher peak positions on the Billboard 200; Extraordinary Machine reached number seven and The Idler Wheel... reached number three. The digital album iTunes Originals – Fiona Apple was released via iTunes in February 2006 in the United States and December 2007 in the United Kingdom. Several of Apple's singles have charted in the US and on the UK Singles Chart, including "Shadowboxer", "Sleep to Dream", "Criminal" and "Fast as You Can". "Every Single Night" peaked at number 72 on Japan's Hot 100 Singles chart.

Apple's debut album earned her several recognitions, including the Grammy Award for Best Female Rock Vocal Performance for "Criminal" and the MTV Video Music Award for Best New Artist in a Video for "Sleep to Dream". For When the Pawn..., Apple received six nominations and won one, the California Music Award for Outstanding Female Vocalist. Of three nominations received for Extraordinary Machine, she won an Esky Music Award for Best Songbird. She won her second Grammy in 2021, when Fetch the Bolt Cutters won Best Alternative Music Album. Apple has received eleven nominations from the Grammy Awards, four from the Billboard Music Video Awards, and three each from the California Music Awards and MTV Video Music Awards. She has also been recognized by the mtvU Woodie Awards, the Shortlist Music Prize (known the year she was nominated as the New Pantheon Music Prize), and the VH1 Fashion Awards.

== ASCAP Pop Music Awards ==
The ASCAP Pop Music Awards honors the songwriters and publishers of the most performed pop songs.

Year	Nominee / work	Award	Result	Ref.
1999	"Criminal"	Most Performed Song	Won	

== Billboard Music Video Awards ==
The Billboard Music Video Awards, which celebrate achievements of the music video industry, are sponsored by Billboard magazine. In 1997, the music video for Apple's "Sleep to Dream" received four nominations, including one for the Maximum Vision Award, which "honors the video that best advances an artist's career". The video also earned Stéphane Sednaoui a nomination for Director of the Year. In 2000, the music video for "Fast as You Can" earned Apple her second nominated in the category Best Clip of the Year. Apple has received one award from four nominations.

Year	Nominated work	Award	Result	Ref.
1997	Fiona Apple ("Sleep to Dream")	Maximum Vision Award	Nominated	
1997	Fiona Apple ("Sleep to Dream")	Best Clip of the Year (Pop/Rock)	Nominated	
1997	Fiona Apple ("Sleep to Dream")	Best New Artist Clip (Pop/Rock)	Won	
2000	"Fast as You Can"	Best Clip of the Year (Pop)	Nominated	

== California Music Awards ==
Founded by now-defunct BAM magazine in 1977 as the Bay Area Music Awards, the "Bammies" were expanded and renamed in 1998 to honor musical excellence across California. Rather than being chosen by an academy, winners are decided by popular vote. Ballots were available in Tower Records stores and participants could also cast their votes online. Apple has received one award from three nominations for When the Pawn..., her second studio album.

Year	Nominated work	Award	Result	Ref.
2000	Fiona Apple	Outstanding Female Vocalist	Won	
2000	Fiona Apple	Outstanding Songwriter	Nominated	
2000	When the Pawn...	Outstanding Album	Nominated	

== Esky Music Awards ==
The Esky Music Awards are awarded annually by Esquire, a men's magazine by the Hearst Corporation. Apple has received one award from one nomination.

Year	Nominated work	Award	Result	Ref.
2006	Fiona Apple (Extraordinary Machine)	Best Songbird	Won	

== GAFFA Awards ==
The GAFFA Awards (Danish: GAFFA Prisen) have been awarded since 1991 by Danish magazine of the same name in the field of popular music.

Year	Nominee / work	Award	Result
2021	Fiona Apple	Best International Solo Act	Nominated
2021	Fetch the Bolt Cutters	Best International Album	Nominated
2021	"Ladies"	Best International Hit	Nominated

== Grammy Awards ==
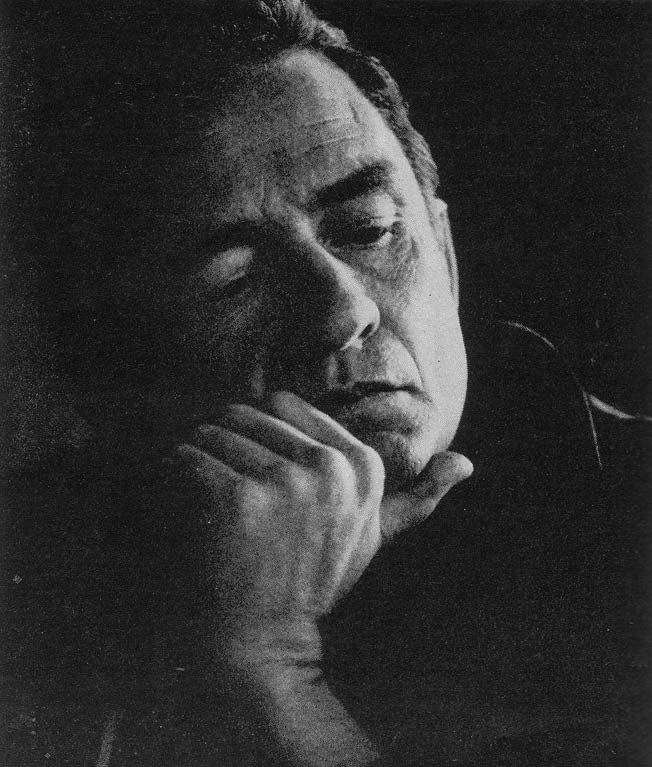
Apple shares her Grammy nomination for Best Country Collaboration with Vocals with Johnny Cash (pictured in 1969) for "Bridge over Troubled Water".

The Grammy Awards are awarded annually by the National Academy of Recording Arts and Sciences of the United States for outstanding achievements in the record industry. Often considered the highest music honor, the awards were established in 1958. All five of Apple's studio albums have earned her nominations, and she has twice been nominated in the Best Female Rock Vocal Performance and Best Rock Song categories. She has been nominated three times in Best Alternative Music Album. Overall, Apple has received three awards from eleven nominations.

Year	Nominated work	Award	Result	Ref.
1998	Fiona Apple	Best New Artist	Nominated	
1998	"Criminal"	Best Female Rock Vocal Performance	Won	
1998	"Criminal"	Best Rock Song	Nominated	
2001	When the Pawn...	Best Alternative Music Album	Nominated	
2001	"Paper Bag"	Best Female Rock Vocal Performance	Nominated	
2002	"Bridge over Troubled Water" (with Johnny Cash)	Best Country Collaboration with Vocals	Nominated	
2006	Extraordinary Machine	Best Pop Vocal Album	Nominated	
2013	The Idler Wheel...	Best Alternative Music Album	Nominated	
2021	Fetch the Bolt Cutters	Best Alternative Music Album	Won	
2021	"Shameika"	Best Rock Performance	Won	
2021	"Shameika"	Best Rock Song	Nominated	

== Groovevolt Music and Fashion Awards ==
Year	Nominee / work	Award	Result	Ref.
2006	Fiona Apple	UberArtist	Won	
2006	Extraordinary Machine	Best Rock Album - Female	Won	

== MTV Video Music Awards ==
The MTV Video Music Awards were established by MTV in 1984 to recognize quality music videos. Apple has received two awards from three nominations.

Year	Nominated work	Award	Result	Ref.
1997	Fiona Apple ("Sleep to Dream")	Best New Artist in a Video	Won	
1998	"Criminal"	Best Female Video	Nominated	
1998	"Criminal" (shared with Harris Savides)	Best Cinematography	Won	

== mtvU Woodie Awards ==
mtvU is the 24-hour media network operated by MTV Networks, targeting college and university campuses across the United States. The mtvU Woodie Awards "honor and highlight the music voted 'best' by the US college audience", with winners determined by online voting. Apple has been nominated once.

Year	Nominated work	Award	Result	Ref.
2006	Herself	Alumni Award	Nominated	
2013	Herself	Fomo Woodie	Nominated	

== Music Video Production Awards ==
The MVPA Awards are annually presented by a Los Angeles-based music trade organization to honor the year's best music videos.

Year	Nominee / work	Award	Result
1998	"Criminal"	Best Styling	Won
2006	"O, Sailor"	Best Direction of a Female Artist	Won
2006	"O, Sailor"	Best Hair	Won
2006	"O, Sailor"	Best Art Direction	Nominated
2006	"O, Sailor"	Best Cinematography	Nominated
2006	"O, Sailor"	Best Choreography	Nominated
2006	"O, Sailor"	Best Make-Up	Nominated

== Pollstar Concert Industry Awards ==
The Pollstar Concert Industry Awards is an annual award ceremony to honor artists and professionals in the concert industry.

Year	Nominee / work	Award	Result
1997	Herself	Best New Artist Tour	Nominated
1998	Tour	Club Tour of the Year	Won

== Rober Awards Music poll ==
Year	Nominee / work	Award	Result	Ref.
2012	Herself	Best Songwriter	Won	
2012	Herself	Return of the Year	Won	
2012	Herself	Best Female Artist	Nominated	
2012	The Idler Wheel...	Album of the Year	Nominated	
2012	"Every Single Night"	Song of the Year	Nominated	
2020	Herself	Best Female Artist	Won	
2020	Herself	Songwriter of the Year	Won	
2020	Fetch the Bolt Cutters	Album of the Year	Won	
2020	"I Want You to Love Me"	Song of the Year	Won	

== Shortlist Music Prize ==
The Shortlist Music Prize was an annual music award for the best album released in the United States that had sold fewer than 500,000 copies at the time of nomination. Established in 2001 as an alternative to the commercial Grammy Awards, recipients are chosen by a panel of entertainment industry members and journalists known as the "Listmakers". Over 50 of the best albums of the previous 12 months are picked before being narrowed down to the Shortlist, from which a winner is chosen. In 2005, the year Apple was nominated, the prize was renamed the New Pantheon Music Award following a dispute between its founders. Apple has been nominated once.

Year	Nominated work	Award	Result	Ref.
2005	Extraordinary Machine	New Pantheon Music Prize	Nominated	

== The Daily Californian Art Awards ==
Year	Nominee / work	Award	Result	Ref.
2020	Fetch the Bolt Cutters	Best Alternative Album	Won	

== VH1 Fashion Awards ==
The VH1 Fashion Awards, hosted by the American cable television network VH1, "honor the melding worlds of fashion and entertainment". Apple has received one award from two nominations.

Year	Nominated work	Award	Result
1997	Fiona Apple	Most Fashionable Artist	Nominated
1997	"Criminal"	Most Stylish Music Video	Won

== Other recognitions ==
In 1997, Apple appeared on the cover of Rolling Stone, which would be included in its own 2009 list of "Hottest Covers". Reader's Poll results published in the January 1998 issue of the magazine revealed that Apple was voted "Best Female Performer".

Robert Dimery included Tidal in his book, 1001 Albums You Must Hear Before You Die (2006). In 2007, the album was included at number 20 on Entertainment Weekly's list of the "100 best albums from 1983 to 2008". Rolling Stone included Tidal as number 83 on its 2011 list of the "100 Best Albums of the Nineties". The Rolling Stone Reader's Poll for 2005 ranked Extraordinary Machine at number five for "Best Album"; in the same poll, Apple was ranked number three for "Best Female Performer" and number one for "Most Welcome Back". In 2011, the magazine included the album as number 49 on its list of the "100 Best Albums of the 2000s".

In 2012, Apple's song "Dull Tool" was shortlisted, but failed to make the final list of nominees, for the Academy Award for Best Original Song.

In 2023, Rolling Stone ranked Apple at number 111 on its list of the 200 Greatest Singers of All Time.
