= Paper Bag (song) =

2000 single by Fiona Apple

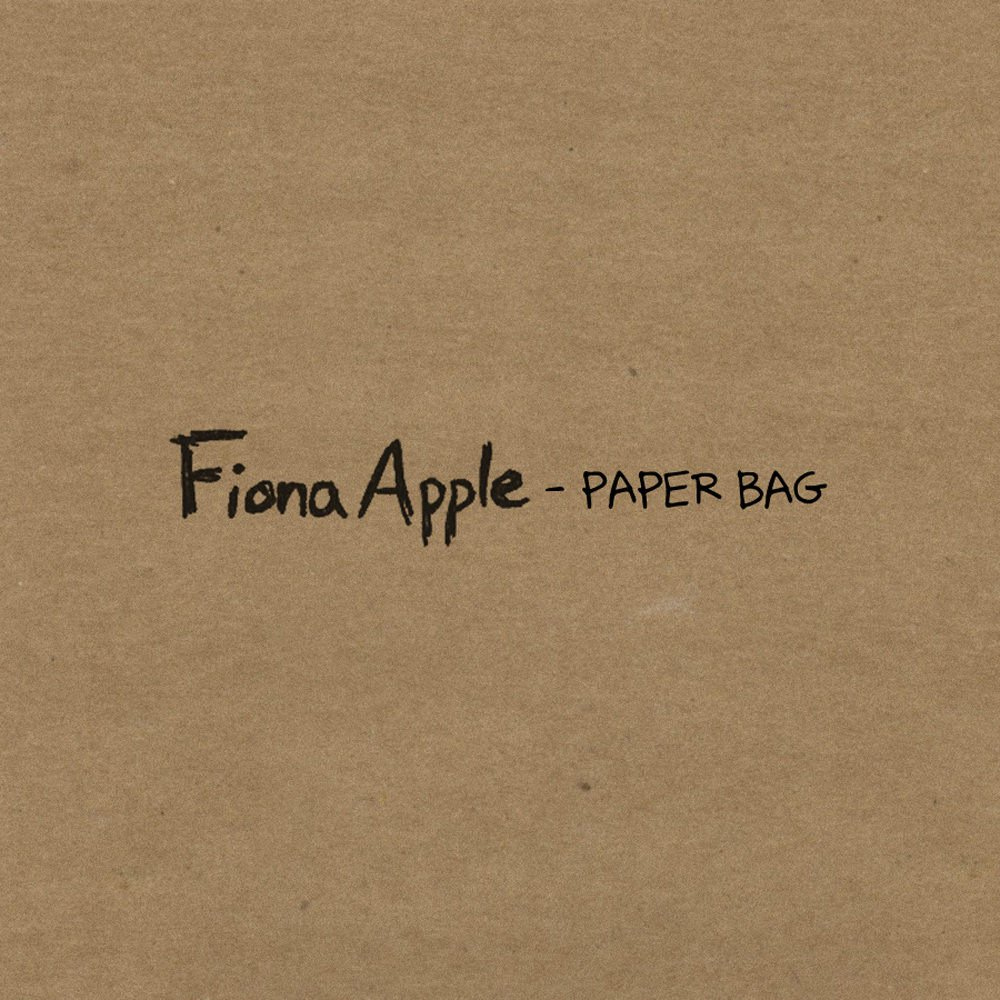

Single by Fiona Apple

from the album When the Pawn...
- Released: June 2000 (U.S.)
- Recorded: 1999
- Studio: One on One South (North Hollywood, CA)
- Genre: Pop
- Length: 3:40
- Label: Epic
- Songwriter: Fiona Apple
- Producer: Jon Brion

Fiona Apple singles chronology
"Fast as You Can" (1999)	"Paper Bag" (2000)	"O' Sailor" (2005)

Music video
- "Paper Bag" on YouTube

"Paper Bag" is a song by American singer-songwriter Fiona Apple, released as the third single from her second studio album, When the Pawn... (1999). The song earned Apple a Grammy Award nomination for Best Female Rock Vocal Performance for the 43rd Grammy Awards (2001).

== Background and composition ==
"Paper Bag" has been described as a cabaret inspired song with baroque elements. Apple wrote the song following an experience in which she mistook a plastic bag for a dove. The event took place in Los Angeles following recording sessions for her previous studio album, Tidal (1996); Apple, reportedly upset at the time, was a passenger in a car being driven by her father. Apple's lyrics are what she calls "extensions of her journal", many of which draw experiences from a rape and subsequent mental health problems, including disordered eating, obsessive–compulsive disorder, and complex post-traumatic stress disorder. The lyrics in "Paper Bag" are about minimizing different types of pain, something that is reflective of the feminine experience, and resonated with girls and women in online conversations associated heavily with trauma and eating disorders, particularly anorexia nervosa, a different disorder than Apple's own. "Hunger hurts, but starving works" became a common, relatable slogan in disordered eating communities.

AllMusic's Matthew Greenwald described "Paper Bag" as having a "loose, almost ragtime" melody and rhythm pattern, with an "up and down" chord pattern creating a "funky, looping feel". The Record noted the "infectious" song includes "Beatlesesque horns". The Boston Globe classified it as a "piano ditty" that "owes equally to Kurt Weill and Paul McCartney," while The Buffalo News noted that it "provides a more contemporary hip hop sound" than other songs on her album.

== Music video ==
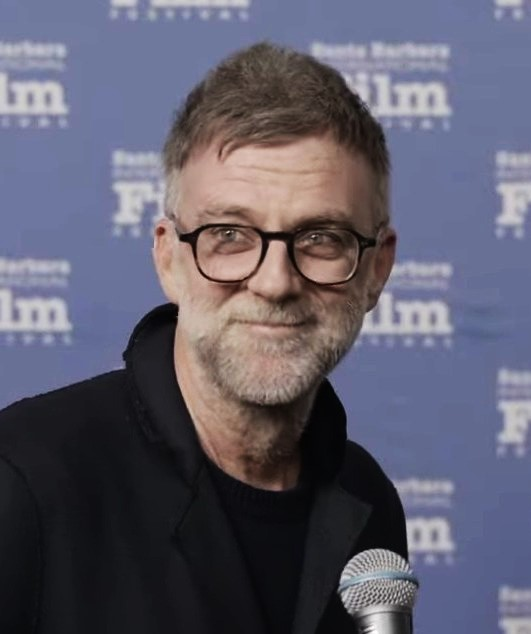
Paul Thomas Anderson

Paul Thomas Anderson directed the music video for "Paper Bag", which features a blue-and-red palette. Anderson and Apple were in a romantic relationship at the time. The video was filmed at Los Angeles's Union Station, specifically the Fred Harvey restaurant portion of the terminal.

== Usage in media ==
"Paper Bag" has been featured in three feature films: 2006's The Last Kiss, 2011's Bridesmaids and 2024's The Idea of You.

== Reception ==
Matthew Greenwald of AllMusic wrote that "Paper Bag" was one of the more accessible, "inspiring" tracks from the album. Greenwald appreciated Don Sweeney's horn arrangement, which he called "joyous". In 2012, Bob Gendron of the Chicago Tribune opined, "A midst a backdrop of gently brushed drums, 'Paper Bag' highlighted an ugly tempestuousness at odds with its breezy cabaret melody." In the "Rolling Stone Special Nineties Edition," the song was ranked as the 29th. In 2021, Rolling Stone ranked it as the 382nd greatest song of all time.

The song is considered a "fan favorite". It earned Apple a Grammy Award nomination for Best Female Rock Vocal Performance for the 43rd Grammy Awards (2001).
