= Criminal (Fiona Apple song) =

1997 single by Fiona Apple

Single by Fiona Apple

from the album Tidal
- B-side: "Sleep to Dream"
- Released: June 2, 1997
- Studio: Ocean Way Recording (Los Angeles, California)
- Genre: Blues; soul
- Length: 5:41
- Label: Work; Columbia
- Songwriter: Fiona Apple
- Producer: Andrew Slater

Fiona Apple singles chronology
"Sleep to Dream" (1997)	"Criminal" (1997)	"Never Is a Promise" (1997)

Music video
- "Criminal" on YouTube

"Criminal" is a song by American recording artist Fiona Apple, the third single from her debut studio album, Tidal, released on June 2, 1997, through Work Records and Columbia Records. Apple has stated that the song is about "feeling bad for getting something so easily by using your sexuality". Apple's highest-charting single, it peaked at No. 21 on the Billboard Hot 100 (her only entry as of 2026), as well as No. 4 on the Billboard Modern Rock Tracks.

The song won the Grammy Award for Best Female Rock Vocal Performance at the 40th Grammy Awards and was nominated for Best Rock Song. "Criminal" was listed at No. 55 on VH1's "100 Greatest Songs of the '90s", and No. 71 on Blender magazine's 2005 list of "The 500 Greatest Songs Since You Were Born".

== Music video ==
The song's music video was directed by Mark Romanek in May 1997 with cinematography by Harris Savides. It was released a month later in June 1997. Visual enhancements including the retroreflector in Fiona Apple's eyes and additional lighting vignettes were created by visualist Ash Beck. The video features Apple sulking in various states of undress, and The New Yorker described her as "looking like an underfed Calvin Klein model", known as the "heroin chic" look. It explores themes of voyeurism and adolescence. In 1998, the video won an MTV Video Music Award for Best Cinematography.

The video was featured in the 1997 MTV special "Beavis and Butt-Head Do Thanksgiving". Up until Beavis and Butt-Head's revival in 2011, it was the last to be critiqued by the duo among other videos in the special.

== Track listings ==
- US CD, 7-inch, and cassette single
1. "Criminal" – 5:41
2. "Sleep to Dream" – 4:10
- European CD single
1. "Criminal" (album version)
2. "Slow Like Honey" (live version)
- Australian CD single
1. "Criminal" (radio edit)
2. "Slow Like Honey" (live)
3. "The Child Is Gone" (live)
4. "Never Is a Promise" (live)

== Personnel ==
Personnel are taken from the Tidal liner notes.

- Fiona Apple – vocals
- Jon Brion – Chamberlin
- Matt Chamberlain – drums
- Rob Laufer – guitar
- Dan Rothchild – bass
- Patrick Warren – piano

== Charts ==
=== Weekly charts ===
Chart (1997–1998)	Peak position
Australia (ARIA)	51
Canada Top Singles (RPM)	28
Canada Rock/Alternative (RPM)	9
US Billboard Hot 100	21
US Adult Alternative Airplay (Billboard)	2
US Adult Pop Airplay (Billboard)	17
US Alternative Airplay (Billboard)	4
US Pop Airplay (Billboard)	18

=== Year-end charts ===
Chart (1997)	Position
US Modern Rock Tracks (Billboard)	26
US Top 40/Mainstream (Billboard)	100
US Triple A (Billboard)	15

Chart (1998)	Position
US Adult Top 40 (Billboard)	71
US Mainstream Top 40 (Billboard)	88

== Certifications ==
Region	Certification	Certified units/sales
United States (RIAA)	Platinum	1,000,000^{‡}
^{‡} Sales+streaming figures based on certification alone.

== Release history ==
Region	Date	Format(s)	Label(s)	Ref.
United States	June 2, 1997	Alternative radio	Work	
United States	September 16, 1997	7-inch vinyl; CD; cassette	Work	

== Cover versions ==
Singer Natalie Cole covered the song for her 20th studio album, Leavin' (2006). Len Righi of The Morning Call wrote that she was surprised at Cole's ability to transform the "agonizing, brazen lament" into "a funky, Tina Turner-type, rump-shaker".

In "Massacres and Matinees", the second episode of American Horror Story: Freak Show, Bette and Dot Tattler (played by Sarah Paulson) perform a duet version of "Criminal".

== Legacy ==
The music video for "Criminal" was the main inspiration for It Was Romance frontperson Lane Moore's music video to her song "Hooking Up with Girls", with many visuals as well as costumes inspired by the video. "Criminal" was ranked number 423 on Rolling Stone's 2021 list of the "Top 500 Songs of All Time".
