= When the Pawn... =

1999 studio album by Fiona Apple

Studio album by Fiona Apple
- Released: November 9, 1999
- Recorded: 1998–1999
- Studios: Andora; Chateau Brion; NRG; Ocean Way; One on One South; Presence; Woodwinds
- Genre: Alternative pop
- Length: 42:39
- Labels: Epic; Clean Slate
- Producer: Jon Brion

Fiona Apple chronology
Tidal (1996)	When the Pawn... (1999)	Extraordinary Machine (2005)

Vinyl cover
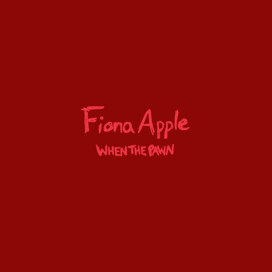

Singles from When the Pawn...
- 1. "Fast as You Can" Released: October 5, 1999; 2. "Limp" Released: February 15, 2000; 3. "Paper Bag" Released: June 2000

When the Pawn... (Note: Full title: When the Pawn Hits the Conflicts He Thinks Like a King What He Knows Throws the Blows When He Goes to the Fight and He'll Win the Whole Thing 'Fore He Enters the Ring There's No Body to Batter When Your Mind Is Your Might So When You Go Solo, You Hold Your Own Hand and Remember That Depth Is the Greatest of Heights and If You Know Where You Stand, Then You Know Where to Land and If You Fall It Won't Matter, Cuz You'll Know That You're Right.) is the second studio album by the American singer-songwriter Fiona Apple. It was released on November 9, 1999, through Epic Records. The recording was produced by Jon Brion. It is noted for its original 90-word title—then a record for the longest album title—which Apple wrote as a poem in response to a negative cover story published by Spin.

The album received positive reviews and was nominated for the Grammy Award for Best Alternative Music Album. In 2011, Slant Magazine named When the Pawn... the 79th-best album of the 1990s, and in 2010 Spin named it the 106th-best album of the preceding 25 years. In 2020, Rolling Stone included it at number 108 on its updated list of the "500 Greatest Albums of All Time".

== Background and recording ==
=== Album conception ===
When the Pawn… followed the success and controversy of Tidal, Apple's debut album. She had faced public scrutiny, specifically for her 1997 VMA speech, where she stated, "this world is bullshit". The speech urges viewers to be themselves and not compare or change themselves because of the media they are consuming. This outburst came as a response to backlash from her "Criminal" music video. She would continue to have a negative attitude towards the media. Fiona stated that writing music began as a response to fighting with her parents but became cathartic in her life. Apple writes her own music about past experiences she has dealt with. Many songs on the album speak about tumultuous relationships with others as well as with herself. The tumultuous relationship that inspired many of the songs on this album is thought to be with Paul Thomas Anderson. The two were together from 1997 to 2002. The couple began doing drugs together, where Apple would then start a long road of addiction and later recovery which affected later albums. When the Pawn… reflected all these circumstances around the production.

=== Title ===
The full album title is:

When the pawn hits the conflicts he thinks like a king
What he knows throws the blows when he goes to the fight
And he'll win the whole thing 'fore he enters the ring
There's no body to batter when your mind is your might
So when you go solo, you hold your own hand
And remember that depth is the greatest of heights
And if you know where you stand, then you know where to land
And if you fall it won't matter, cuz you'll know that you're right

The title is a poem Apple wrote in response to unfavorable reactions from readers to a Spin cover story about her. Apple said: "It came from being made fun of, and then, of course, it becomes a thing I'm being made fun of for." Richard Harrington of The Washington Post called it Apple's version of the Chumbawamba lyric "I get knocked down, but I get up again" from their 1997 single "Tubthumping".

When the Pawn... broke the record for longest album title at 444 characters (previously held by a volume in The Best... Album in the World...Ever!), though this record was subsequently broken. (Note: Soulwax's Most of the Remixes, released in 2007, broke Apple's record with 552 characters. Their record was itself broken in 2008 by Chumbawamba, whose album title The Boy Bands Have Won has 865 characters.)

== Composition and lyrics ==
When the Pawn... has been described as an alternative pop album. Mark Zeltner of PopMatters wrote that "the jazz allusions in her earlier work have metamorphosed into genuine jazz phrasing in her vocals and her piano work". Writing for Stereogum on the album's 20th anniversary, Tom Breihan said that "Fast as You Can" owes "more to '70s jazz" than to drum and bass, and called the record "an anti-pop movie". Rob Sheffield of Rolling Stone wrote that, with Jon Brion playing "a reverse George Martin to her Paul McCartney", Apple "bears down on her voice and piano with enough rock command to produce some truly fine songs".

According to Katherine St. Asaph of Pitchfork: "When the Pawn… is about knowing your patterns, knowing the rubble they’ve made of your life—and knowing you’ll do it again." Asaph also said: "[Apple's] vocal roles are larger-than-life: precise and unsingably fast, fit for a technical rapper, or open-throated and dramatic, like a stage diva commandeering an encore."

== Release ==
The first single, "Fast as You Can", was fairly popular and received moderate radio and video airplay. It reached the top 20 on the US Billboard Modern Rock Tracks chart and became Apple's first top 40 hit on the UK Singles Chart. The follow-up singles, "Limp" and especially "Paper Bag", were less successful, though "Paper Bag" earned Apple a nomination for Best Female Rock Vocal Performance at the 43rd Annual Grammy Awards in 2001. Apple's boyfriend at the time, filmmaker Paul Thomas Anderson, directed the videos for all three singles.

In 2019, Apple collaborated with King Princess on a cover of "I Know". The song was released for Spotify's RISE program on January 25. A reissue by Vinyl Me Please was announced in 2020 featuring a new cover chosen by Fiona, marking the album's first ever vinyl pressing.

== Reception ==
Professional ratings
Aggregate scores
Source	Rating
Metacritic	79/100
Review scores
Source	Rating
AllMusic	4.5/5 stars
Chicago Sun-Times	3.5/4 stars
Entertainment Weekly	A
The Guardian	3/5 stars
The Independent	3/5 stars
Los Angeles Times	3.5/4 stars
NME	5/10
Pitchfork	8.0/10 (1999); 9.4/10 (2019)
Q	4/5 stars
Rolling Stone	3.5/5 stars
Slant Magazine	3/5 stars
Spin	8/10
The Village Voice	A−

=== Critical reception ===
In comparison to Apple's debut album Tidal, Harrington stated, "When the Pawn is a decidedly more mature work that trades in youthful melodrama for somber ruminations on shattered relationships and romantic obsession". In The New Rolling Stone Album Guide, Jenny Eliscu states that Pawn is "more musically complex and melodically advanced" than the previous album, while focusing on Apple's "sultry voice and moody piano playing". Rob Sheffield of Rolling Stone gave the album three-and-a-half out of five stars, calling it "richer, deeper and stronger than Tidal, in every way", with "a far more muscular approach to both the songs and the singing".

Entertainment Weekly's David Browne awarded the album an A grade, praising Jon Brion's production as well as Apple's songwriting: "Apple hasn't gained much in psychic confidence following the success of Tidal. On When the Pawn..., Apple presents herself as a mental shambles, and she's more than happy to tell us about it." Pitchfork originally gave the album a score of eight out of ten, with reviewer Chip Chanko praising Apple's lyrics, writing: "[Apple] seems older. Her voice is full of a heartfelt soul that seems almost timeless. While Billie Holiday would never have considered the possibility of lines like, 'It won't be long till you'll be/ Lying limp in your own hand,' Apple executes them flawlessly with a modern passion." Amy Linden of Vibe wrote: "When the Pawn... is full of images that resonate. Apple's a sad, sultry woman with a sense of who she is—even if that person isn't someone she wants to be. Once again, her pain brings us joy." In contrast, Piers Martin of NME rated it a 5 out of 10, calling it Apple's "second album of Amos-aping MTV-branded Lilith Fair fodder."

In 2011, Slant Magazine named When the Pawn... the 79th-best album of the 1990s, and in 2010 Spin named it the 106th-best album of the preceding 25 years. In 2020, Rolling Stone included it at number 108 on its updated list of the "500 Greatest Albums of All Time".

=== Commercial performance ===
On the U.S. Billboard 200, When the Pawn... debuted and peaked at number 13 with 103,000 copies sold in first week. On March 26, 2020, When the Pawn.. was certified Platinum by the Recording Industry Association of America.

== Track listing ==
All tracks are written by Fiona Apple.

No.	Title	Length
1.	"On the Bound"	5:22
2.	"To Your Love"	3:40
3.	"Limp"	3:29
4.	"Love Ridden"	3:22
5.	"Paper Bag"	3:39
6.	"A Mistake"	4:56
7.	"Fast as You Can"	4:38
8.	"The Way Things Are"	4:16
9.	"Get Gone"	4:07
10.	"I Know"	4:55
Total length:		42:39

Japanese Edition bonus tracks
No.	Title	Writer(s)	Length
11.	"Across the Universe"	Lennon–McCartney	5:06
12.	"Never Is a Promise (Live)"		6:12
Total length:			53:57

== Personnel ==
=== Musicians ===
- Fiona Apple – vocals, piano
- Jon Brion – "all other instruments" (all except "Love Ridden")
- Matt Chamberlain – drums, percussion (except "A Mistake", "I Know")
- Mike Breaux – woodwinds (1, 3, 7)
- Patrick Warren – Chamberlin (2, 3, 7, 9), Wurlitzer (3, 7)
- Randall Brion – string arrangements (4, 9, 10)
- John Bainbridge – orchestration (4, 9, 10); horn arrangements (5)
- Charlie Bisharat, Eve Butler, Susan Chatman, Armen Garabedian, Berj Garabedian, Gerardo Hilera, Peter Kent, Brian Leonard, Robert Peterson, Michele Richards, Edmund Stein, John Wittenberg – violin (4, 9, 10)
- Robert Becker, Denyse Buffman, Scott Haupert, Maria Newman – viola (4, 9, 10)
- Larry Corbett, Paula Hochalter, Suzie Katayama, Daniel Smith – cello (4, 9, 10)
- Mike Elizondo – bass (4, 9, 10)
- Tom Biller – guitar and synth (8)
- Greg Cohen – bass guitar (10)
- Jonathan "Butch" Norton – drums, percussion (2, 3)
- Jim Keltner – drums (10)
- Wendell Kelly, Jean Martinelli, John Noreyko, Paul Loredo – horns (5)

=== Technical personnel ===
- Jon Brion – producer, mixing
- Rich Costey – recording, mixing, photography
- Eddy Scheyer – mastering
- Ian Sefchick – mastering (2020 LP)
- Steve Mixdorf, John Tyree, Greg Collins, Rob Brill, Tom Banghart – assistant engineers
- Hooshik – art director
- Robert Elswitt, David Goggins – photography
- Fiona Apple, Michael "Jocco" Phillips – cover art concept, design

== Charts ==
=== Weekly charts ===
Chart (1999–2000)	Peak position
Australian Albums (ARIA)	54
French Albums (SNEP)	32
German Albums (Offizielle Top 100)	66
Irish Albums (IRMA)	34
Scottish Albums (Official Charts)	64
UK Albums (Official Charts)	46
US Billboard 200	13

=== Year-end charts ===
Chart (2000)	Position
US Billboard 200	169

== Certifications ==
Region	Certification	Certified units/sales
Japan (RIAJ)	Gold	100,000^{^}
United Kingdom (BPI)	Silver	60,000^{‡}
United States (RIAA)	Platinum	1,000,000^{‡}
^{^} Shipments figures based on certification alone.^{‡} Sales+streaming figures based on certification alone.
