= Lane Moore =

American singer-songwriter

Lane Moore is an American stand-up comedian, actor, author, musician, writer, and director, living in New York, New York.

== Career ==
She is a former writer for The Onion and The Onion Book of Known Knowledge: A Definitive Encyclopaedia Of Existing Information and regularly contributes to The New Yorker, The Washington Post , and McSweeney's.

Brooklyn Based said Moore's comedy "deftly highlights the absurdity of everyday life, with just the right touch of self-deprecation" and addressed her multiple careers, saying, "Moore has, by her own count, 'like 35 careers,' and is jealousy-inducingly good at all of them." Vogue also praised Moore for being a polymath, calling her a "jack of all trades."

Paste named her Twitter one of "The 75 Best Twitter Accounts of 2014" and "The 75 Best Twitter Accounts of 2015," ranking it at #19 both times. Refinery 29 called Moore one of "The Female Stand-Up Comedians You Need To Know." Bust called Moore one of "10 Funny Ladies You Need To Be Watching" and Brooklyn Magazine called Moore one of "Brooklyn's Funniest 50 People." Bust also called her band It Was Romance the "Best Band of 2015" and Billboard named them one of "16 Lesbian & Queer Female-Fronted Bands You Should Know." Bustle named her one of the top comedians of 2017. Out Magazine named her one of the OUT100 of 2017, a list that celebrates compelling people who have had a hand in moving forward LGBT rights.

Moore was previously the Sex & Relationships Editor for Cosmopolitan, where she was the driving force in making the site more LGBTQ inclusive, which led to her winning a GLAAD Media Award in 2016. Moore has also written for Glamour, GQ, Elle, Esquire, and Marie Claire.

In late 2015, Moore created popular Tumblr blog Male Feminists of Tinder, which was immediately praised by numerous outlets including New York Magazine, which called it "brilliant...a perfect snapshot of a particular, awkward moment in culture and technology." Paper Magazine called it "the best Tumblr ever," BuzzFeed called it "a gift," and Cosmopolitan called it "hilarious...drop-dead funny."

In 2017, Moore created the Tumblr blog "Hotties of MTV's Next," where she posted contestant profiles she'd curated from the reality dating series Next. The page was praised by news outlets including The A.V. Club, which called it "a time machine that highlights an undocumented era when collars were popped, tips were frosted, and farting was its own kind of cultural currency." Cosmopolitan called the page "perfect" and Moore a "genius." Moore also appeared on @midnight for a segment based around the account, which Chris Hardwick called "amazing."

== Tinder Live ==
Moore is the creator and host of Tinder Live, a stand-up comedy show where she uses the dating app Tinder and interacts with potential matches in real time. During the show, Moore projects Tinder profiles in front of an audience and panelists help her dissect profiles before swiping left (no) or right (yes). The comedy show, which began in 2014, performs in theaters around the world.

The New York Times described it as "truly addictive entertainment...ingenious. Moore transforms the banter on a dating app into compelling long-form improvisation. Ms. Moore, a cagey and humane performer, has developed an instinct for turning the raw materials of sexually charged chat with ordinary strangers into honed and generous jokes. 'Tinder Live' has a comic momentum and energy that is unusual. The way she manipulates tone and pace reveals an artist supremely confident in her form, not to mention a flirt par excellence."

Tinder Live was also called one of the best comedy shows in NYC by The New York Times, The Village Voice, Time Out, CBS, New York Magazine, Brooklyn Magazine, and HelloGiggles who noted the show "has all the addictive, fun qualities of a television game show. One of her show's segments include going through Tinder profiles with the audience to come to a vote on whether to swipe left or right. This could be this generation's version of The Dating Game."

Tinder Live has been praised for its positivity, with Vice saying, "Moore expertly steered the crowd from mean-heartedness to substance with each match." Brooklyn Based said, "In anyone else's hands this show could feel mean-spirited, or perhaps like an invasion of privacy, but Moore makes it cathartic, a bracing comedic espresso shot."

Vulture listed Tinder Live in a guide to the best NYC comedy shows along with Assscat 3000, Whiplash, and the Comedy Cellar.

Featured guests include David Cross, Janeane Garofalo, Amber Tamblyn, Sasheer Zamata, Ed Solomon, Lamorne Morris, David Koechner, Jon Glaser, Hari Kondabolu, Aparna Nancherla, Mara Wilson, Stacy London, Ashley Nicole Black, Jo Firestone, Laura Benanti, Amanda Knox, Stephanie March, James Urbaniak, Lizz Winstead, Heather Matarazzo, Scott Adsit, Grace Helbig, and musicians like Sondre Lerche, JD Samson, and Jean Grae.

== Television ==
The New York Times described Moore's role on Season 5 of Girls as "One of my favorite moments of this season," praising Moore's performance as "wonderful." She has also guest starred on Search Party.

== Books ==
Moore published her first book How To Be Alone: If You Want To And Even If You Don't on November 8, 2018. It received coverage and praise from outlets including The New York Times, New York, NPR, Fast Company, and Marie Claire.

In summer 2019, Moore gave a TED Talk based on the book, also called How To Be Alone.

In 2023, Moore published You Will Find Your People: How to Make Meaningful Friendships as an Adult which won the American Book Fest Award, and was critically praised by New York Magazine, Good Morning America, NPR, The Atlantic, Vulture, PBS, Publishers Weekly, CBS, and BUST. The Los Angeles Times described the book as "funny and forthright."

== Music career ==
=== It Was Romance ===
Moore is a vocalist, songwriter, and multi-instrumentalist who performs under the stage name It Was Romance, which Oxygen describes as a "high-energy rock band." Pitchfork listed her self-titled debut album as an album to watch and Bust magazine called It Was Romance the Best Band of 2015. The Village Voice premiered her first single, "Philadelphia," on their website, calling the song "mysterious but undeniably attractive. It evokes feelings of loneliness with a danceable beat, not unlike a somber nighttime walk home on wet roads, with colorful, joyous city lights reflecting like a black mirror" and praising the album for its "glittering instrumental aspect and Moore's velvety vocal delivery make the rest of "It Was Romance" saunter around like the life of the party, occasionally winking just to make sure you're hooked."

Paste Magazine described the sound as:

"hearkening back to a Dig Me Out era Sleater Kinney, Moore's expansive sound covers love and all its mishaps with a catchy, blast loud and sing proud thoughtfulness. Blending garage rock with soul and experimental undertones, It Was Romance...walks multiple genres with a deft grace to mirror Moore's bubbly wit and eye-catching presence."

The Laugh Button praised Moore's voice, saying, "[Moore's] incredible voice, smoky and edgy and closely resembling the kind of stuff soulful grunge bands aspired to back in the 90s."

The music video for "Hooking Up With Girls" was released in late 2016 in Nylon. The video is a shot-for-shot remake of Fiona Apple's "Criminal" music video. Moore starred in and directed the music video, and Nylon praised her for going "above and beyond to recreate the iconic video, searching for similar houses and costumes. Spoiler alert: She even added '90s MTV title cards."

The video was featured on Entertainment Weekly, Billboard, Vogue, The Huffington Post, The Guardian, VICE, BUST Magazine, Refinery 29, and The Onion's A.V. Club, who said of the video "when [Moore] sings directly to the camera, it seems like an overly intimate confession." New York Magazine praised Moore for the video, adding, "It's that weirdness that makes Moore so charming, and maybe the best homage to "Criminal" is one where the artist is unapologetically herself." The New York Observer said, "The classic shots are all there: Lane and Fiona both writhe in satin camisoles, looking up at the camera with bright, tear-red eyes; cowering in a closet with hair in twin braids, singing from a bathtub between a partner's legs; and in that iconic opening, pointing a camera at the audience: the voyeur becoming the viewed. [And] goddammit this song is catchy."

In 2017, Moore started a music series at Arlene's Grocery called "90s Albums Live," with the first one being the Empire Records soundtrack which she and her band performed live.

== Accolades ==
Moore won a 2016 GLAAD Media Award for Outstanding Magazine Overall Coverage for her groundbreaking work at Cosmopolitan. She was also nominated for a 2016 White House LGBT Champions of Change award. Out Magazine named her one of the OUT100 of 2017, a list that celebrates compelling people who have had a hand in moving forward LGBT rights.

In 2023, Moore's second book You Will Find Your People won the American Book Fest Award.
