= Fast as You Can =

1999 single by Fiona Apple

Single by Fiona Apple

from the album When the Pawn...
- B-side: "Across the Universe"
- Released: October 5, 1999
- Studio: NRG (Los Angeles)
- Genre: Jazz fusion; pop
- Length: 4:40 (album version); 3:46 (radio edit)
- Label: Epic; 550 Music; Clean Slate
- Songwriter: Fiona Apple
- Producer: Jon Brion

Fiona Apple singles chronology
"Across the Universe" (1998)	"Fast as You Can" (1999)	"Paper Bag" (2000)

Music video
- "Fast as You Can" on YouTube

"Fast as You Can" is a song written by Fiona Apple, and produced by Jon Brion for her second album, When the Pawn.... It was released as the album's lead single in the United States on October 5, 1999, and in the United Kingdom on February 14, 2000. It became one of Apple's most successful singles in both countries, and its music video, directed by Paul Thomas Anderson, was well received.

== Background and style ==
Fiona Apple said that with the song, she wanted to explore different moods and the "ups and downs" of a relationship. "When you get to the middle [of the song], that spell of confusion takes you out of the element for a minute, which is, of course, what happens emotionally. But the beat never changes." Apple said the song is "really just thoughts that were running through my head that were in that rhythm".

Jon Brion said he knew "exactly" what he wanted the song to sound like. "I knew I wanted it to be Matt Chamberlain on drums", he said. "He can play all this beautiful machine-influenced stuff, but with human feel." Brion played a "very busy bass line idea" for Apple on a keyboard in his kitchen, combining the line with a "groove" in the style of Chamberlain's work. Apple became excited and said, "That's great! That feels exactly like it!" Brion and Apple stressed in interviews that it was Apple, and not Brion, who created the time-changes and structure in the song were already present when he worked on it. "All I did was to heighten pre-existing things", Brion said. "In terms of the color changes, I am coordinating all of those, but the rhythms are absolutely Fiona's."

The Philadelphia Inquirer described the song as "slightly off-kilter, perpetually destabilized ... an intricate suite of shifting moods that starts as a '60s soul-jazz stomp, then is connected by a rueful ballad interlude to a sauntering triple-meter chorus." The New York Times wrote that it "signals its mood swings — love me, fight me, don't go, get out while you can — with tempo changes and unlikely interludes, from a blunt hip-hop drumbeat to [flute-like] 'Strawberry Fields' keyboards." Newsweek characterized the song as "galloping" and "syncopated", and Spin magazine called it "skittery".

The cover of the promo CD for the single in the US was drawn by Apple.

== Chart performance ==
The single debuted on the US Billboard Modern Rock Tracks chart in late October, receiving minimal radio airplay until When the Pawn... made a strong debut on the Billboard 200 albums chart. It subsequently rose to number 20 on the Modern Rock Tracks chart in mid-December, remaining on the chart for 12 weeks. On the Adult Top 40 chart, on which it debuted in early December, "Fast as You Can" peaked at number 29 and stayed on the chart until early February 2000. The song became a top-10 hit on the Triple-A chart, peaking at number eight in January 2000. It failed to appear on the Billboard Hot 100 but became Apple's first—and, currently, only—single to reach the top 40 on the United Kingdom Singles Chart, where it was released on February 14 and peaked at number 33. In Ireland, the song reached number 49. "Fast as You Can" also reached number 62 in Australia's annual Triple J Hottest 100 poll.

== Music video ==
The single's music video was directed by Apple's then-boyfriend, film director Paul Thomas Anderson, who directed the video for Apple's previous single, "Across the Universe" (1998). Anderson shot the video in Pasadena, California with the crew he uses during the production of his films. "[I]t's all really fun", Apple said of the video. "I don't have to wear any makeup or anybody else's clothes — no negligees!" The video was photographed by Robert Elswit and edited by Dylan Tichenor, and it premiered on MTV and VH1 the week ending on September 19, 1999. In the video, Apple is seen singing the song in and around a house, inside a garage, at a subway station and on a subway train. The video was filmed with a vintage hand-cranked camera, which is why Apple's mouth does not match the lyrics she sings. Throughout the video there are changes from black-and-white to colour and from fullscreen aspect ratio to widescreen. It was nominated for a 2000 Billboard Music Award for "Best Pop Clip of the Year", with media sources describing it as "quirky", "simple, improvised", "playful and inventive".

== Track listings ==
UK CD1

1. "Fast as You Can" (radio edit) – 3:46
2. "Never Is a Promise" (live) – 6:25
3. "Across the Universe" – 5:06

UK CD2

1. "Fast as You Can" – 4:38
2. "Sleep to Dream" – 4:08
3. "I Know" – 4:57

UK cassette single

1. "Fast as You Can" – 4:38
2. "Never Is a Promise" (live) – 6:25

European CD single

1. "Fast as You Can" (radio edit) – 3:46
2. "Across the Universe" (remix) – 3:43

European maxi-CD single

1. "Fast as You Can" (radio edit) – 3:46
2. "Across the Universe" (remix) – 3:43
3. "Never Is a Promise" (live) – 6:25

Japanese CD single

1. "Fast as You Can" (radio edit) – 3:47
2. "Limp" – 3:30
3. "Fast as You Can" (album version) – 4:39

== Personnel ==
- Produced by Jon Brion
- Recorded by Rich Costey
- Mixed by Rich Costey and Jon Brion
- Programming by Rich Costey
- Vocals and piano by Fiona Apple
- All other instruments by Jon Brion
- Drums and percussion by Matt Chamberlain
- Woodwinds by Michael Breaux
- Chamberlin and Wurlitzer by Patrick Warren

== Charts ==
=== Weekly charts ===
Chart (1999–2000)	Peak position
Ireland (IRMA)	49
Scotland Singles (OCC)	32
UK Singles (OCC)	33
US Adult Alternative Airplay (Billboard)	8
US Adult Pop Airplay (Billboard)	29
US Alternative Airplay (Billboard)	20

=== Year-end charts ===
Chart (2000)	Position
US Triple-A (Billboard)	45

== Release history ==
Region	Date	Format(s)	Label(s)	Ref.
United States	October 5, 1999	Alternative radio	Epic; 550 Music; Clean Slate	
United States	October 26, 1999	Contemporary hit radio	Epic; 550 Music; Clean Slate	
Japan	November 20, 1999	CD	SME; Clean Slate	
United Kingdom	February 14, 2000	CD; cassette	Columbia	
