= Tinder Live =

American improvised comedy show

Tinder Live with Lane Moore
- Genre: Alternative Comedy; Improvisational Comedy
- Show type: Comedy Show
- Date of premiere: 2014
- Final show: Current

Creative team
- Creator: Lane Moore

Tinder Live is a stand-up comedy show created and hosted by comedian Lane Moore where she goes on the dating app Tinder and interacts with Tinder matches in real time. During the show, Moore projects Tinder profiles in front of an audience and panelists help her dissect profiles before swiping left (no) or right (yes).

Featured guests include David Cross, Janeane Garofalo, Amber Tamblyn, Sasheer Zamata, Ed Solomon, Lamorne Morris, David Koechner, Jon Glaser, Hari Kondabolu, Aparna Nancherla, Mara Wilson, Stacy London, Ashley Nicole Black, Jo Firestone, Laura Benanti, Amanda Knox, Stephanie March, James Urbaniak, Lizz Winstead, Heather Matarazzo, Scott Adsit, Grace Helbig, and musicians like Sondre Lerche, JD Samson, and Jean Grae.

== Reception ==
Reception for Tinder Live has been overwhelmingly positive. The New York Times described it as "truly addictive entertainment...[it's] ingenious. Moore transforms the banter on a dating app into compelling long-form improvisation. Ms. Moore, a cagey and humane performer, has developed an instinct for turning the raw materials of sexually charged chat with ordinary strangers into honed and generous jokes. “Tinder Live” has a comic momentum and energy that is unusual. The way she manipulates tone and pace reveals an artist supremely confident in her form, not to mention a flirt par excellence."

Tinder Live was called one of the best comedy shows in NYC by The New York Times, The Village Voice, Time Out, CBS, New York Magazine, Brooklyn Magazine, and HelloGiggles who noted the show "has all the addictive, fun qualities of a television game show. One of her show’s segments include going through Tinder profiles with the audience to come to a vote on whether to swipe left or right. This could be this generation’s version of The Dating Game."

Tinder Live has been praised for its positivity, with Vice saying, "Moore expertly steered the crowd from mean-heartedness to substance with each match." Brooklyn Based said, "In anyone else’s hands this show could feel mean-spirited, or perhaps like an invasion of privacy, but Moore makes it cathartic, a bracing comedic espresso shot."

Vulture listed Tinder Live! in a guide to the best NYC comedy shows along with Assscat 3000, Whiplash, and the Comedy Cellar.
