= It Was Romance =

American rock band

- Origin: Brooklyn, New York, United States
- Genres: garage rock, Indie rock, folk rock, blues rock, alternative rock
- Instruments: Vocals, electric ukulele, guitar, piano, synthesizer, bass guitar, drums, accordion
- Years active: 2015–present
- Members: Lane Moore
- Website: www.instagram.com/itwasromance

It Was Romance is an American rock band formed by Lane Moore. It began as the bedroom recording project of lead singer and songwriter Moore, who years later added a backing band. Moore is the chief songwriter, singer, and multi-instrumentalist, using an electric ukulele with distortion that she plays like an electric guitar as well as piano, synthesizer, accordion, bass guitar, and percussion. Bust magazine called It Was Romance The Best Band Of 2015.

== History ==
The Village Voice premiered their first single, "Philadelphia" off their self-titled debut in 2015.

Paste Magazine described their sound as "hearkening back to a Dig Me Out era Sleater Kinney, Moore’s expansive sound covers love and all its mishaps with a catchy, blast loud and sing proud thoughtfulness. Blending garage rock with soul and experimental undertones, It Was Romance...walks multiple genres with a deft grace to mirror Moore’s bubbly wit and eye-catching presence."

The band released a music video for the first single "Philadelphia" in June 2015. The video was directed by Moore and was an homage to the John Waters film Cry-Baby, with Moore playing Johnny Depp and Traci Lords. The Advocate praised the video. Curve Magazine called the video "badass." Out Magazine praised the video as well.

The music video for "Hooking Up With Girls" was released in late 2016 on the front page of Nylon. The video is a shot-for-shot remake of Fiona Apple's "Criminal" music video. Moore starred in and directed the music video.

The video was featured in Entertainment Weekly, Billboard, Vogue, The Huffington Post, The Guardian, VICE, BUST Magazine, Refinery 29, and The Onion's AV Club New York Magazine and The Observer praised Moore for the video

The Laugh Button described Moore's voice as, "incredible [voice], smoky and edgy and closely resembling the kind of stuff soulful grunge bands aspired to back in the 90s."

In 2017, Moore created a music series at Arlene's Grocery called "90s Albums Live," with the first one being the Empire Records soundtrack, which It Was Romance performed live.

Also in 2017, Billboard named It Was Romance one of 16 Female-Fronted Bands You Should Know.

== Discography ==
=== Studio albums ===
- It Was Romance, self-released, 2015

=== Videos ===
- "Philadelphia"
- "Hooking Up With Girls"
