= The Idler Wheel Tour =

2012 concert tour by Fiona Apple

- Tour by Fiona Apple
- Associated album: The Idler Wheel...
- Start date: March 14, 2012
- End date: December 9, 2012
- Legs: 4
- No. of shows: 73

Fiona Apple concert chronology
- Extraordinary Machine Tour (2005–06); The Idler Wheel Tour (2012)

The Idler Wheel Tour is the fourth tour by American singer-songwriter Fiona Apple. Apple announced a small tour in Spring 2012 prompting speculation over a new album. Ahead of her first performance on the tour, Apple confirmed the album. The tour marked Apple's first performances outside of Los Angeles in over five years. Apple kicked off the tour with two performances at the South By Southwest Festival where she debuted three new songs from The Idler Wheel.... Apple's first date at the Lincoln Hall sold out quickly and caused the Lincoln Hall's servers to crash. A second date was announced at Lincoln Hall shortly after. Apple was originally scheduled to perform at the Sixth & I Historic Synagogue on March 21 but was postponed to March 28.

On June 19, the same date The Idler Wheel... released, Apple began the second leg of the tour. The second leg of the tour was much larger. The second leg of the tour kicked off in Ithaca, New York, and wrapped on July 29 at the Hollywood Palladium, and made stops at iconic venues like Nashville's Ryman Auditorium, historic opera houses, and the New York's Governors Ball festival on Randalls Island with Modest Mouse and Beck among the other acts performing. September and October dates were announced on June 18.

On November 20, 2012, Apple posted a handwritten letter addressed to her fans on her Facebook page, in which she announced the cancellation of her South American tour due to the failing health of her dog, Janet.

== Tour ==
Date	City	Country	Venue
First Leg
March 14, 2012	Austin	United States	South by Southwest
March 15, 2012	Austin	United States	South by Southwest
March 18, 2012	Chicago	United States	Lincoln Hall
March 19, 2012	Chicago	United States	Lincoln Hall
March 23, 2012	Brooklyn	United States	Music Hall of Williamsburg
March 24, 2012	Atlantic City	United States	The Borgata Music Box
March 26, 2012	New York City	United States	Bowery Ballroom
March 27, 2012	Boston	United States	Royale
March 28, 2012	Washington, D.C.	United States	Sixth & I Historic Synagogue
Second Leg
June 19, 2012	Ithaca	United States	State Theatre of Ithaca
June 20, 2012	Baltimore	United States	Lyric Opera House
June 22, 2012	Mashantucket	United States	MGM Grand Theater at Foxwoods
June 23, 2012	Northampton	United States	Calvin Theatre
June 24, 2012	New York City	United States	Governors Ball Music Festival
June 26, 2012	Washington, D.C.	United States	Warner Theatre
June 27, 2012	Upper Darby Township	United States	Tower Theater
June 29, 2012	Danbury	United States	Ives Concert Park
June 30, 2012	Boston	United States	Citi Performing Arts Center
July 1, 2012	Portland	United States	State Theatre
July 3, 2012	Montreal	Canada	Olympia de Montreal
July 4, 2012	Toronto	Canada	The Sound Academy
July 6, 2012	Cleveland Heights	United States	Cain Park
July 7, 2012	Detroit	United States	The Fillmore Detroit
July 9, 2012	Grand Rapids	United States	Meijer Gardens
July 10, 2012	Chicago	United States	Chicago Theatre
July 11, 2012	Indianapolis	United States	Murat Theatre
July 13, 2012	Nashville	United States	Ryman Auditorium
July 14, 2012	St. Louis	United States	Peabody Opera House
July 16, 2012	Minneapolis	United States	Orpheum Theatre
July 17, 2012	Kansas City	United States	The Midland by AMC
July 20, 2012	Denver	United States	Paramount Theatre
July 21, 2012	Salt Lake City	United States	Kingsbury Hall
July 24, 2012	Vancouver	Canada	The Orpheum
July 25, 2012	Seattle	United States	Paramount Theatre
July 26, 2012	Portland	United States	Arlene Schnitzer Concert Hall
July 28, 2012	Oakland	United States	Fox Oakland Theatre
July 29, 2012	Hollywood	United States	Hollywood Palladium
Third Leg
September 9, 2012	San Jose	United States	San Jose Civic Auditorium
September 11, 2012	San Francisco	United States	The Warfield
September 12, 2012	Santa Barbara	United States	Santa Barbara Bowl
September 14, 2012	Los Angeles	United States	Greek Theatre
September 15, 2012	Las Vegas	United States	The Joint
September 16, 2012	Oceanside	United States	Independence Jam – Coastal Invasion 2012
September 18, 2012	Mesa	United States	Mesa Arts Center
September 20, 2012	Austin	United States	Austin City Limits
September 21, 2012	Houston	United States	Bayou Music Center
September 22, 2012	Thackerville	United States	WinStar World Casino
September 24, 2012	New Orleans	United States	House of Blues
September 26, 2012	Charlotte	United States	The Fillmore Charlotte
September 27, 2012	Durham	United States	Durham Performing Arts Center
September 29, 2012	Clearwater	United States	Ruth Eckerd Hall
September 30, 2012	Miami Beach	United States	The Fillmore Miami Beach
October 1, 2012	Orlando	United States	Hard Rock Live
October 3, 2012	Atlanta	United States	The Tabernacle
October 5, 2012	Louisville	United States	The Louisville Palace
October 6, 2012	Cincinnati	United States	Aronoff Center
October 7, 2012	Columbus	United States	Palace Theatre
October 9, 2012	Buffalo	United States	Kleinhans Music Hall
October 10, 2012	Port Chester	United States	Capitol Theater
October 12, 2012	Montclair	United States	Wellmont Theatre
October 13, 2012	Huntington	United States	Paramount Theatre
October 15, 2012	Red Bank	United States	Count Basie Theatre
October 16, 2012	New York City	United States	Terminal 5
October 17, 2012	New York City	United States	Terminal 5
October 19, 2012	Albany	United States	Palace Theatre
October 20, 2012	Atlantic City	United States	Caesars Atlantic City
October 21, 2012	Pittsburgh	United States	Stage AE
Latin America
November 27, 2012	Porto Alegre	Brazil	Auditório Araújo Vianna
November 29, 2012	São Paulo	Brazil	Credicard Hall
November 30, 2012	Rio de Janeiro	Brazil	Vivo Rio
December 2, 2012	Buenos Aires	Argentina	Personal Fest
December 6, 2012	Santiago	Chile	Teatro Caupolican
December 9, 2012	Mexico City	Mexico	El Plaza Condesa

== Box office score data ==
Venue	City	Tickets sold / available	Gross revenue
Sixth and I Historic Synagogue	Washington, D.C.	750 / 750 (100%)	$33,191
Citi Wang Theatre	Boston	2,182 / 2,850 (77%)	$125,839
Theatre L'Olympia	Montreal	922 / 1,050 (88%)	$58,839
Ryman Auditorium	Nashville	2,246 / 2,246 (100%)	$114,722
Chicago Theatre	Chicago	3,429 / 3,429 (100%)	$221,118
Peabody Opera House	St. Louis	1,981 / 2,000 (99%)	$94,995
Orpheum Theatre	Minneapolis	1,965 / 2,055 (96%)	$122,095
Fox Oakland Theatre	Oakland	2,800 / 2,800 (100%)	$147,000
Civic Auditorium	San Jose	795 / 2,876 (27%)	$44,755
The Warfield	San Francisco	2,103 / 2,352 (89%)	$128,609
Greek Theatre	Los Angeles	5,154 / 5,840 (88%)	$302,228
The Joint	Las Vegas	1,139 / 2,670 (43%)	$69,210
TOTAL		25,466 / 30,918 (82%)	$1,462,601

== Personnel ==
- Fiona Apple – Vocals, piano
- Charley Drayton – Drums, percussion
- Amy Wood – Percussion
- Zac Rae – Keyboard
- Sebastian Steinberg – Bass
- Blake Mills – Guitar

Source: Fiona Apple: The Billboard Cover Story
