= O' Sailor =

Single by Fiona Apple

from the album Extraordinary Machine
- Released: August 16, 2005 (U.S.)
- Studio: Phantom Studios, LA and Stanley Recordings, Venice, CA
- Genre: Art rock
- Length: 5:36
- Label: Epic
- Songwriter: Fiona Apple
- Producers: Mike Elizondo; Brian Kehew

Fiona Apple singles chronology
"Paper Bag" (2000)	"O' Sailor" (2005)	"Parting Gift" (2005)

Music video
- "O' Sailor" on YouTube

"O' Sailor" is a song written and performed by American singer Fiona Apple and recorded for her third studio album Extraordinary Machine (2005). On August 15, 2005, ahead of the album's release in early October, Epic Records made both "O' Sailor" and "Parting Gift" for streaming on Apple's website. The following day, the songs were released for digital download at the online iTunes Music Store. It was later released to US adult album alternative radio stations on September 12, 2005.

The single's video, directed by Floria Sigismondi, was filmed aboard the RMS Queen Mary and premiered on VH1 on November 7. It was nominated for eight Music Video Production Company Awards — in the categories of "Direction of a Female Artist", "Director of the Year", "Art Direction", "Cinematography", "Choreography", "Styling", "Hair" and "Make-Up" — and won two: "Direction of a Female Artist" and "Hair".

== Formats and track listing ==
Acetate promo CD single:
1. O' Sailor (Radio Edit) (4:39)
2. O' Sailor (Album Version) (5:36)

== Charts ==
Chart (2005)	Peak position
US Triple A Indicator (Radio & Records)	15

== Personnel ==
- Piano by Fiona Apple
- Drums by Abe Laboriel Jr.
- Bass by Mike Elizondo
- Tack piano, pump organ, vibes, clavinet, Chamberlin, Farfisa and arp string ensemble by Zac Rae
- Yamaha Portasound and 360 Systems by Jebin Bruni
- Flute by Glenn Berger
