= Dull Tool =

Song by Fiona Apple from the film This Is 40
- Released: December 11, 2012
- Length: 4:22
- Label: Capitol Records; Universal Music
- Songwriter: Fiona Apple
- Producer: Jon Brion

"Dull Tool" is a song by American singer-songwriter Fiona Apple, released on the soundtrack to the comedy film This Is 40 (2012). It is the first track Apple wrote solely for a film. "Dull Tool" was produced by Apple's long-time collaborator Jon Brion, and leaked online in November 2012, several weeks before the soundtrack hit stores on December 11.

== Background and composition ==
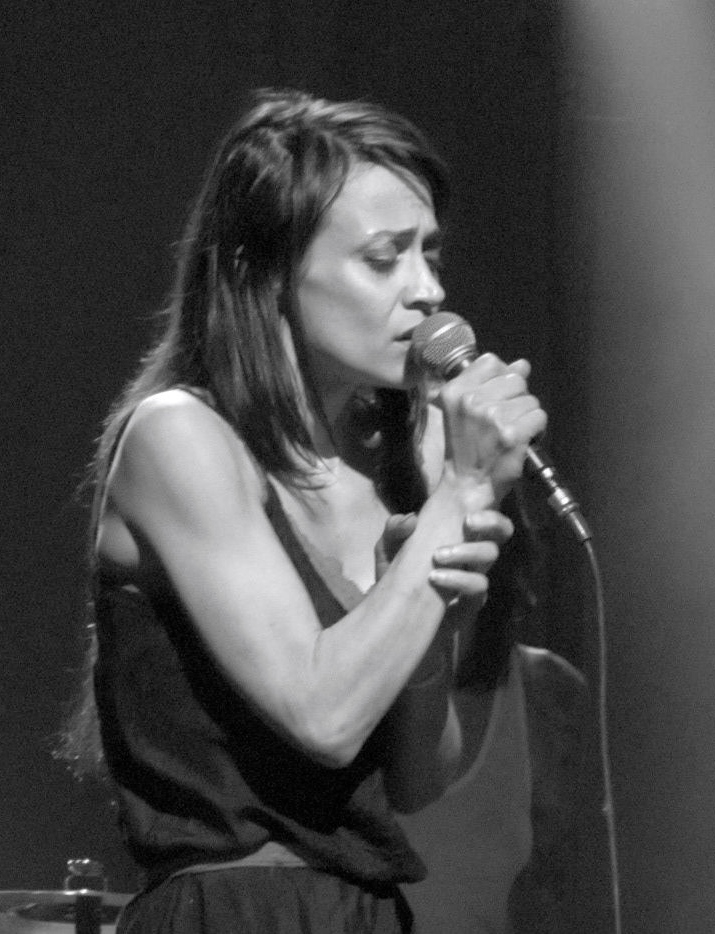
Fiona Apple in 2012

American singer-songwriter Fiona Apple became involved with the comedy 2012 film This Is 40 after being sent a script by its writer and director, Judd Apatow. The two had met a few years previously during a benefit concert for a family clinic; Apatow was a self-described fan of her music. Some time after sending Apple the script, film composer Jon Brion told Apatow that Apple had recorded a demo for the film. Apatow later commented in an interview with Pitchfork Media, "I didn't know she would write anything. The song was perfect, and I knew exactly where to put it." He added that Apple had recorded a second song, but he could not find an appropriate place to insert it into the film; he called this song "equally as great as 'Dull Tool'. It was heartbreaking not to put it in, but I'm sure it'll reach people at some point. It's a beautiful song." Brion, a long-time collaborator of Apple's, produced "Dull Tool", as well as every other original song featured on the album. The second song written by Apple for the film, "Cosmonauts", was also recorded with Jon Brion, but went unreleased at the time, eventually appearing in re-recorded form on Apple's acclaimed 2020 album, Fetch The Bolt Cutters.

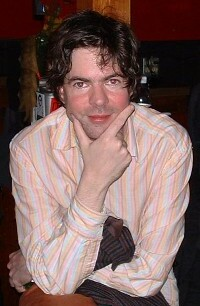
Producer Jon Brion, 2004

"Dull Tool" has been perceived to reference a poorly-ended relationship, in which Apple begins by discussing the game hide and seek and ends by "launching into a barrage of insults." Lyrically, various music critics considered the "dense and fevered" song to be the "tortured antidote" or "painful sequel" to "Hot Knife", a song from Apple's 2012 album, The Idler Wheel.... Slate noted that the song included Apple's regular "fast-tumbling waltzes on the piano" as well as "an orchestra’s worth of mandolins, violins, electric guitars, and timpani."

== Release and reception ==
The song appears in This Is 40, but was not initially planned for inclusion in the film's soundtrack. In October 2012, Pitchfork Media reported a supposed conflict between Apple and her record label, Epic Records. Apple had reportedly "lashed out at her label for pulling promotional support from her new album [The Idler Wheel...] in response to her placing a song on a soundtrack" that was being produced by two other music companies. This led to speculation that Epic did not want the soundtrack to be released. It leaked online in November 2012, several weeks before the soundtrack debuted in stores on December 11.

In a review of the soundtrack, Rolling Stone called the song "sprightly but vicious", while the Corpus Christi Caller-Times opined that the album was "smartly assembled" and Apple's song "convincingly echo[ed] domestic frustration". Though Apple's music has been featured on other film soundtracks, "Dull Tool" marked the first time she could be eligible for an Academy Award. The Huffington Post revealed that Universal had listed it among other pieces it submitted for consideration to the Academy of Motion Picture Arts and Sciences, but it did not receive a nomination for Best Original Song.
