= Shadowboxer (song) =

1996 single by Fiona Apple

Single by Fiona Apple

from the album Tidal
- B-side: "Never Is a Promise"
- Released: July 1, 1996
- Studio: Ocean Way Recording (Los Angeles, California)
- Genre: Jazz
- Length: 5:26
- Label: Work; Columbia
- Songwriter: Fiona Apple
- Producer: Andrew Slater

Fiona Apple singles chronology
"Shadowboxer" (1996)	"Slow Like Honey" (1996)

Music video
- "Shadowboxer" on YouTube

"Shadowboxer" is a song written and performed by American alternative singer-songwriter Fiona Apple. It was released on July 1, 1996, by Work Records and Columbia Records as her debut single from her debut studio album, Tidal.

== Background and release ==
Apple recorded the song with collaborator Jon Brion in 1995 immediately after being signed to a record deal with Sony Music Entertainment. Its lyrical content mainly explores the themes of the dangers of desire and vulnerability. It was then released as her debut and lead single from her forthcoming debut studio album on July 1, 1996. A music video of the song directed by Jim Gable was released. Apple performed "Shadowboxer" in various events, most notably during the 22nd season of Saturday Night Live and on the television special MTV Unplugged: Fiona Apple.

== Music video ==
Shot entirely in black-and-white, this takes place in a recording studio, with scenes of her playing the piano and in Fostex T20RP headphones singing in front of a microphone.

== Chart performance ==
The song charted inside the Top 40 of two different Billboard charts. It spent six weeks on the Alternative Songs chart, peaking at number 34. It fared much better on the Adult Pop Songs, peaking at number 32 and spent over 15 weeks on the chart.

== Critical reception ==
"Shadowboxer" has received critical acclaim from music critics, with many of them comparing Apple's voice to Nina Simone and her lyrical talent to Carole King. Steven Mirkin of Entertainment Weekly gave the song an A−, he wrote, "Singing to a former lover, her slurred, smoky vocals float above a loping, gospel-tinged piano, vibes, and string arrangement, making her 'Shadowboxer' sound like Nina Simone covering early Elton John. Although she's only 18, she has the poise of a seasoned singer." Stephen Thomas Erlewine of AllMusic described the song as "haunting", remarking that while "it strives to say something deep and important, much of the lyrics settle for clichés."

== Track listing ==
CD single

1. "Shadowboxer" – 5:26
2. "Never Is a Promise" – 5:56

Maxi single

1. "Shadowboxer" (radio edit)
2. "Shadowboxer" (album version)
3. "Never Is a Promise"
4. "Carrion" (Live)

== Personnel ==
Personnel taken from Tidal liner notes.

- Fiona Apple – vocals, piano
- Jon Brion – vibraphone, tack piano
- Danny Frankel – drums
- Greg Richling – bass
- Patrick Warren – Chamberlin

== Charts ==
Chart (1996)	Peak position
US Adult Pop Airplay (Billboard)	32
US Alternative Airplay (Billboard)	34

== Release history ==
Country	Date	Format	Label	Ref.
United States	July 1, 1996	CD single	Work, Columbia	rowspan="4"
France	July 1, 1996	CD single	Sony Music Entertainment	
Austria	July 1, 1996	CD single	Sony Music Entertainment	
United Kingdom	July 1, 1996	CD single	Columbia	
United States	October 1, 1996	Contemporary hit radio	Work, Columbia	
