= Fiona Apple =

American musician (born 1977)

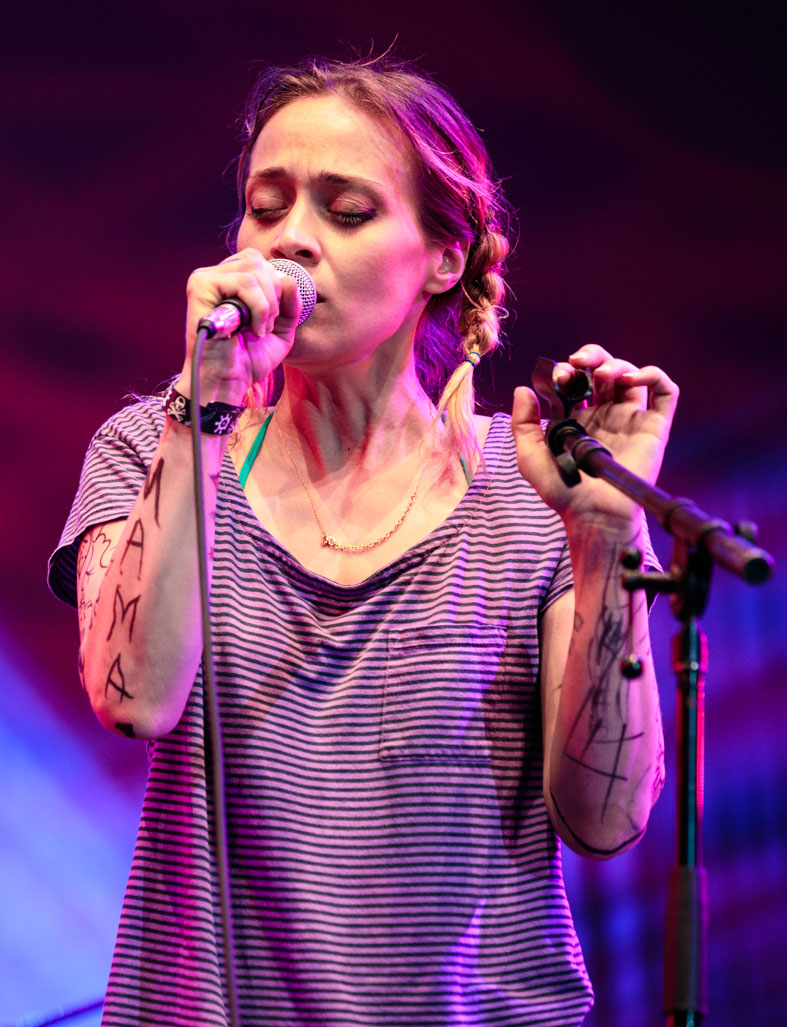
- Fiona Apple performing at Lincoln Center's Out of Doors series, August 8, 2015

Background information
- Born: Fiona Apple McAfee-Maggart; September 13, 1977 (age 49); New York City, U.S.
- Origin: Los Angeles, California, U.S.
- Genres: Art pop; baroque pop; chamber pop; alternative rock; jazz pop
- Occupation: Singer-songwriter
- Instruments: Vocals; piano; percussion
- Years active: 1994–present
- Labels: Epic; Clean Slate; WORK; Columbia
- Website: fionaapplestore.com

Fiona Apple McAfee-Maggart (born September 13, 1977) is an American singer-songwriter. All five of her albums have reached the top 20 on the Billboard 200, and as of 2021, she has sold over 15 million records worldwide. Apple has received numerous accolades, including three Grammy Awards, two MTV Video Music Awards, and a Billboard Music Video Award. Three of her albums appear on Rolling Stone's "500 Greatest Albums of All Time" list.

The youngest daughter of actor Brandon Maggart, Apple was born in New York City and was raised alternating between her mother's home in New York and her father's in Los Angeles. She studied piano as a child and began writing songs when she was eight years old. Her debut album, Tidal (1996), comprises songs written during her teens, and won Best Female Rock Performance at the 39th Annual Grammy Awards for its single "Criminal". Her second album, produced by Jon Brion, When the Pawn... (1999), was met with critical acclaim and received platinum certification by the Recording Industry Association of America (RIAA).

For her third album, Extraordinary Machine (2005), Apple again collaborated with Brion and began recording the album in 2002. She was reportedly unhappy with the production and opted not to release the record, leading fans to protest Epic Records, erroneously believing that the label was withholding its release. The album was remade with producers Mike Elizondo and Brian Kehew and released in October 2005. It was certified gold and nominated for a Grammy Award for Best Pop Vocal Album. In 2012, she released her fourth studio album, The Idler Wheel..., which received critical praise and a nomination for Best Alternative Music Album at the 55th Annual Grammy Awards and was followed by a tour of the United States. Apple's fifth studio album, Fetch the Bolt Cutters (2020), won two Grammy Awards: Best Alternative Music Album and Best Rock Performance for the lead single, "Shameika".

== Early life and education ==
Fiona Apple was born Fiona Apple McAfee-Maggart on September 13, 1977, in New York City to singer Diane McAfee and actor Brandon Maggart, who met when both were cast in the Broadway musical Applause. Her father is from Tennessee, and through him, Apple has Melungeon ancestry. Her maternal grandparents were dancer Millicent Green and big band vocalist Johnny McAfee. Her sister Amber sings cabaret under the stage name Maude Maggart, and actor Garett Maggart is her half-brother. Apple grew up in Morningside Gardens in Morningside Heights with her mother and sister, but spent summers with her father in Los Angeles.

She attended the private Episcopal school St. Hilda's & St. Hugh's School and later Alexander Hamilton High School, as well as being homeschooled. As she studied piano, she often transcribed guitar tablature into standard notation. Apple later began to play along with jazz standards, discovering Billie Holiday and Ella Fitzgerald, who became major influences.

Since childhood, Apple has struggled with obsessive–compulsive disorder (OCD), depression, and anxiety. She has also been diagnosed with complex post-traumatic stress disorder. At age 12 she was raped outside her family's Harlem apartment. She subsequently developed an eating disorder to intentionally keep herself slim as she perceived her developing body as "bait" for sexual predators. "I definitely did have an eating disorder", she recalled. "What was really frustrating for me was that everyone thought I was anorexic, and I wasn't. I was just really depressed and self-loathing." She also described how OCD developed into avoidant/restrictive food intake disorder, requiring food to be a certain color or shape.

After the rape, Apple began attending Model Mugging classes, practicing self-defense, but continued to suffer panic attacks while walking home from school, which led her to live with her father for a year. In Los Angeles, she attended Alexander Hamilton High School for her second year.

In a 2000 interview, Apple said that, contrary to speculation by journalists, she did not write songs about the trauma of her rape: "It doesn't get into the writing. It's a boring pain. It's such a fuckin' old pain that, you know, there's nothing poetic about it." In a 2020 interview, she expressed regret about this remark: "Young girls were listening, and I said 'that's a boring pain.' Fuck, man. I'm so pissed at myself for doing that. I'm so pissed at the person who told me that was boring and who got on my shit for—got on my case for trying to talk about things".

== Career ==
=== 1994–2001: Tidal and When the Pawn... ===
Apple was introduced to the music industry in 1994, when she gave a demo tape containing the songs "Never Is a Promise", "Not One of Those Times", and "He Takes a Taxi" to a friend who worked as a babysitter for music publicist Kathryn Schenker. Schenker passed the tape along to Sony Music executive Andy Slater. Apple's abilities captured his attention, and Slater signed her to a record deal.

In 1996, Apple's debut album, Tidal, was released by Work Records and Columbia Records. The record was largely inspired by Apple's recent breakup with her first boyfriend. It sold 2.7 million copies and was certified three times Platinum in the U.S. "Criminal", the third single, became a hit and reached the Top 40 on the U.S. Billboard Hot 100. The song's controversial Mark Romanek-directed music video played on MTV. Other singles from Tidal include "Shadowboxer", "Sleep to Dream", and "Never Is a Promise". Apple accepted the MTV Video Music Award for Best New Artist at the 1997 MTV Video Music Awards for her song "Sleep to Dream". In her acceptance speech she said:

This world is bullshit. And you shouldn't model your life—wait a second—you shouldn't model your life about what you think that we think is cool and what we're wearing and what we're saying and everything. Go with yourself.

Apple responded to criticisms of her acceptance speech in Rolling Stone in January 1998, saying, "When I have something to say, I'll say it." During this period, she covered the Beatles' "Across the Universe" and Percy Mayfield's "Please Send Me Someone to Love" for the soundtrack of the film Pleasantville. She later canceled the last 21 dates on a tour in support of her album due to "personal family problems". In 1997, Apple met director Paul Thomas Anderson during a photoshoot, and the two began a relationship that lasted until 2002.

Apple's second album, When the Pawn..., was released in 1999. Its full title is a poem Apple wrote after reading letters that appeared in Spin about an article that had cast her in a negative light. The title's length earned it a spot in the Guinness Book of Records for 2001. (As of 2007, it is no longer the longest album title, as Soulwax released Most of the Remixes, a remix album whose title surpasses When the Pawn's length by 100 characters). When the Pawn was cultivated during Apple's relationship with Anderson. Produced by Jon Brion, it has more expressive lyrics, experiments more with drum loops, and incorporates both the Chamberlin and drummer Matt Chamberlain. The album received a positive reception from publications such as Rolling Stone. It did not fare as well commercially as her debut, but it was an RIAA-certified Platinum album and sold one million copies in the U.S. Its lead single, "Fast as You Can", reached the top 20 on Billboard's Modern Rock Tracks chart and became Apple's first Top 40 hit in the UK. The videos for two follow-up singles, "Paper Bag" and "Limp" (directed by Anderson), received very little play.

In a February 2000 set hampered by equipment issues to 3,000 audience members at the New York City Roseland Ballroom, a frustrated Apple left the stage without returning. She appeared distraught by the sound quality, apologizing repeatedly for the sound and crying. After completing a concert tour in support of her second album in 2000, Apple moved to Los Angeles, where she still resides as of 2020.

=== 2002–2010: Extraordinary Machine and release delays ===
During her hiatus, Apple contemplated retiring from recording. She sang with Johnny Cash on a cover of Simon & Garfunkel's "Bridge over Troubled Water" that appears on his album American IV: The Man Comes Around and was nominated for a Grammy Award for "Best Country Collaboration with Vocals". She also collaborated with Cash on Cat Stevens's "Father and Son", included in his 2003 collection Unearthed.

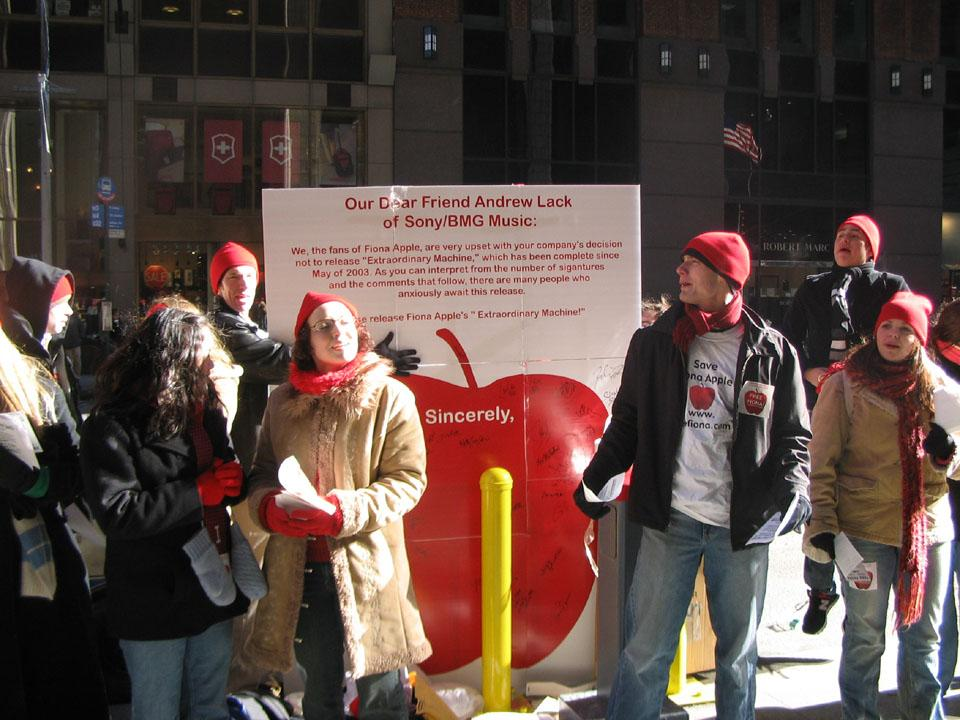
Fans in support of Fiona Apple demonstrating outside the NYC headquarters of Sony BMG Music Entertainment in January 2005.

Apple's third album, Extraordinary Machine, was originally produced by Jon Brion. In spring 2002, Apple and Brion, her longtime friend and producer on When the Pawn, met for their weekly lunch meeting. Brion reportedly "begged" Apple to make another album. Apple agreed, and Brion went to Epic Records with strict stipulations (including no deadline), to which the label eventually agreed. Recording sessions began in 2002 at Ocean Way Studios in Nashville, then moved to the Paramour Mansion in Los Angeles. Work on the album continued until 2003, and in May of that year it was submitted to Sony executives. In 2004 and 2005, tracks were leaked on the Internet in MP3 format and played on U.S. and international radio. Subsequently, MP3s of the entire album went online. Although a website distributing the album was quickly shut down, it soon reached P2P networks and was downloaded by fans. A fan-led campaign supported the album's official release.

Mike Elizondo, who played bass on Pawn, was brought back as co-producer to complete the tracks he had begun with Brion and Apple. Spin later reported: "Fans erroneously thought that Apple's record label, Epic, had rejected the first version of Extraordinary Machine... in reality, according to Elizondo, Apple was unhappy with the results, and it was her decision to redo the record, not her label's." In August 2005, the album was given an October release date. Production had been largely redone "from scratch" by Elizondo and was co-produced by Brian Kehew. Two of the 11 leaked tracks were relatively unchanged, and one new song was included. Despite suggestions that the album had caused a rift between Brion and Apple, they regularly perform together at Largo, a club in Los Angeles, including a joint appearance with Elizondo on bass just before the news broke of an official release. Extraordinary Machine debuted at number seven and was nominated for a Grammy Award for "Best Pop Vocal Album". It was eventually certified Gold, though its singles ("Parting Gift", "O' Sailor", "Not About Love", and "Get Him Back") failed to enter any Billboard charts. Apple went on tour to promote the album. Beginning in the mid-2000s, Apple dated writer and television creator Jonathan Ames.

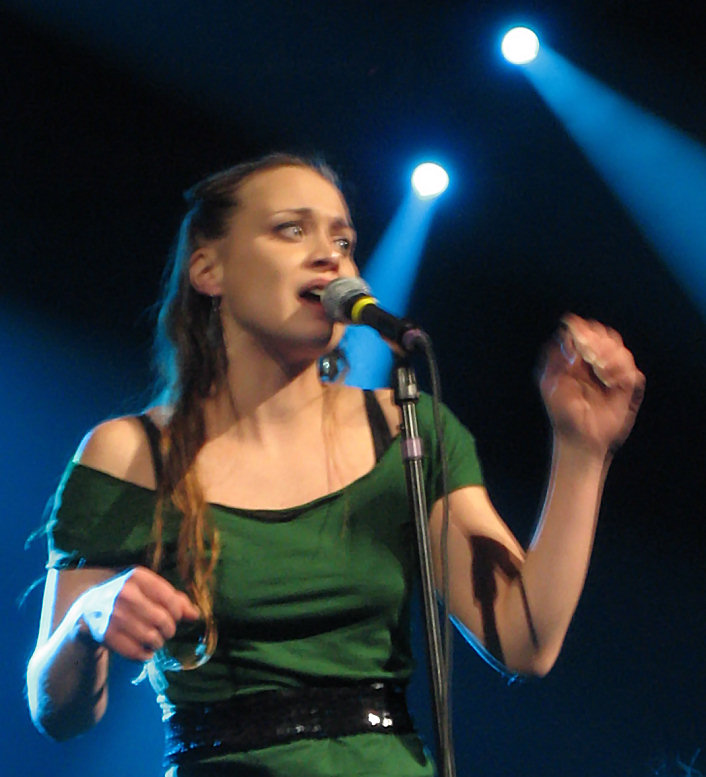
Apple performing in Seattle, Washington, 2006

In June 2006, Apple appeared on the joke track "Come Over and Get It (Up in 'Dem Guts)" by comedian Zach Galifianakis. Galifianakis previously appeared in the video for Apple's "Not About Love". Apple recorded a cover of "Sally's Song" for the 2006 special edition release of the soundtrack for the Tim Burton film The Nightmare Before Christmas. In May 2006, Apple paid tribute to Elvis Costello on VH1's concert series Decades Rock Live! by performing his hit "I Want You". Her version was released as a digital single. Apple toured the East Coast in August 2007 with Nickel Creek. In 2008, she recorded a duet, "Still I", with Christophe Deluy. In 2009, she covered "Why Try to Change Me Now" and "I Walk A Little Faster" for The Best Is Yet to Come – The Songs of Cy Coleman.

In January 2010, Apple and Brion performed together at "Love and Haiti, Too: A Music Benefit", a charity concert for people hurt by the Haiti earthquake. Apple sang a cover of "(S)he's Funny That Way", composed by Neil Moret, lyrics by Richard Whiting, which is often associated with Billie Holiday. In June 2010, Apple released the song "So Sleepy", produced by Brion and written by children involved with the nonprofit organization 826LA. The song is included on a compilation album the organization released, Chickens in Love. Apple collaborated with Margaret Cho on her album Cho Dependent, which was released on August 24, 2010.

=== 2011–2018: The Idler Wheel..., tour, and legal troubles ===
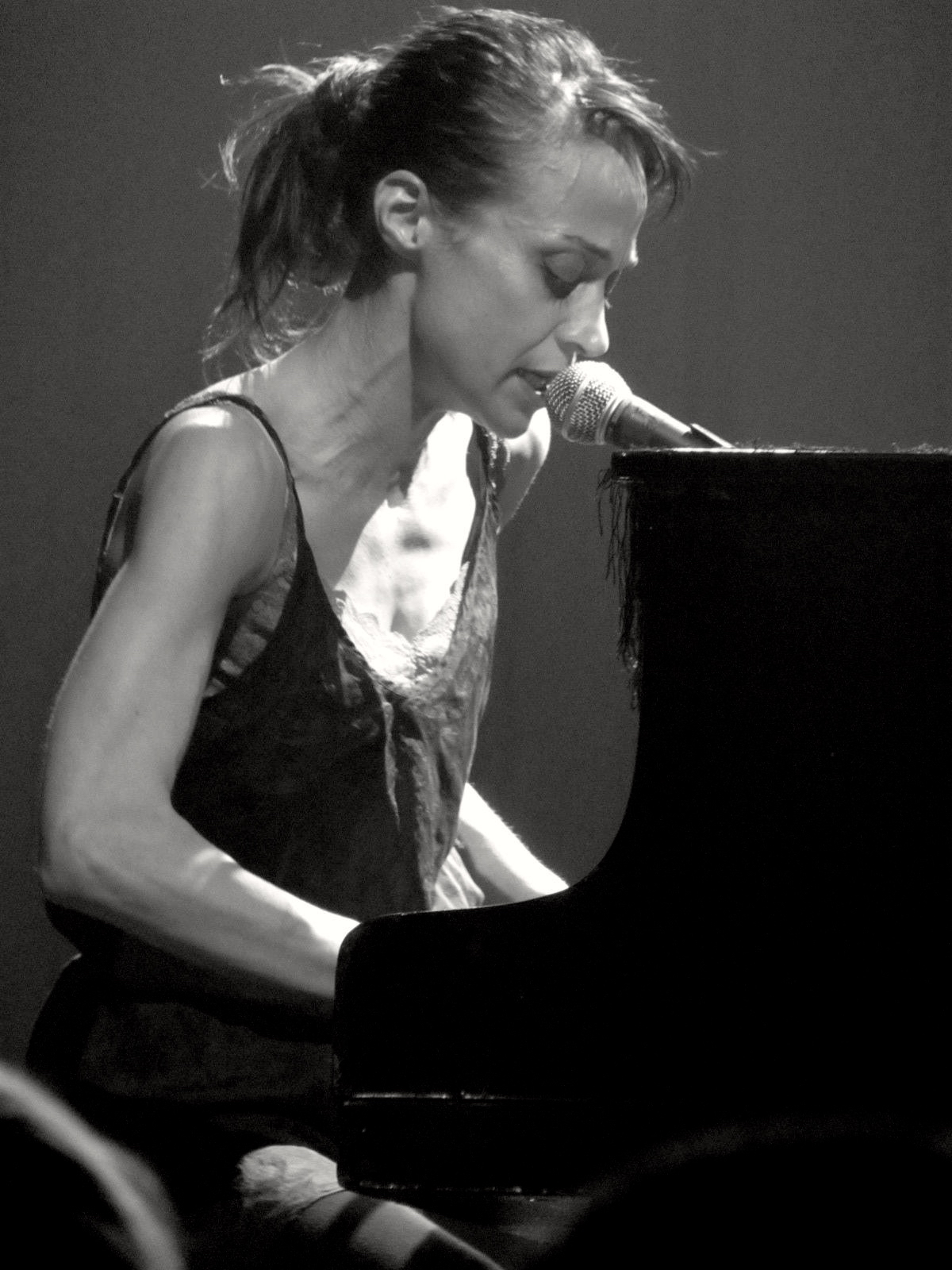
Apple performing at Terminal 5, New York, 2012

In late 2010, Billboard reported that Apple was planning to release a new album in spring 2011, with musician Michelle Branch claiming to have heard some of the new tracks. Drummer Charley Drayton also told Modern Drummer magazine that he was co-producing the record. The album was not released that spring and Billboard later reported that Epic was not aware of a record. Apple delayed the album's release until 2012, explaining that she was waiting "until her label found a new president and that she didn't want her work to be mishandled amid corporate disarray." In January 2012, after new president LA Reid hinted at new music from Apple, Epic Records announced that the album would be released later that year. Apple announced performances at the South by Southwest Festival and a spring 2012 tour soon after.

The Idler Wheel..., Apple's fourth studio album, was released on June 19, 2012, in the United States. It became Apple's most successful album on the Billboard 200, where it peaked at number three, and received critical acclaim. According to American Songwriter, "The Idler Wheel isn't always pretty, but it pulses with life, brutal and true."

While promoting The Idler Wheel, Apple said in a June 2012 interview that she had briefly married an unnamed French photographer, later revealed to be Lionel Deluy, "for complicated reasons" and had a passing liaison with a younger woman. In July she gave an in-depth interview on Marc Maron's WTF podcast in which she described her experience with obsessive–compulsive disorder throughout her adult life. She also divulged that she had recently decided to quit drinking. On September 19, 2012, Apple was arrested at an internal U.S. Border Patrol checkpoint in Sierra Blanca, Texas, and charged with possession of hashish, detaining her en route to a concert in Austin, Texas, at the Hudspeth County Jail.

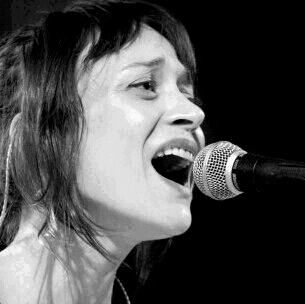
Apple performing in Miami Beach, 2012

Apple contributed the previously unreleased song "Dull Tool" to the soundtrack of the 2012 Judd Apatow film This Is 40. Another song was recorded for the film but not used and became the track "Cosmonauts" on her 2020 album Fetch the Bolt Cutters. In November 2012, Apple wrote a letter to her fans, a scan of which was posted to her website and her Facebook page, postponing the South American leg of her tour due to the health of her dog, Janet. According to the letter, the dog had Addison's disease and had had a tumor "idling in her chest" for two years.

In September 2013, a Chipotle ad appeared online with a soundtrack of Apple covering "Pure Imagination" from the 1971 film Willy Wonka and the Chocolate Factory. The video, which follows a scarecrow as he discovers the truth about factory farming and processed food, was described as "haunted", "dystopian", "bizarre", and "beautiful".

In 2014, Apple wrote the opening theme, "Container", for the Showtime drama series The Affair. She appeared at a number of performances by Blake Mills in 2014, including in New York City and Cambridge, Massachusetts, during his tour in support of his second full-length album, Heigh Ho. The pair first publicly collaborated on an acoustic version of Apple's song "I Know" in 2013.

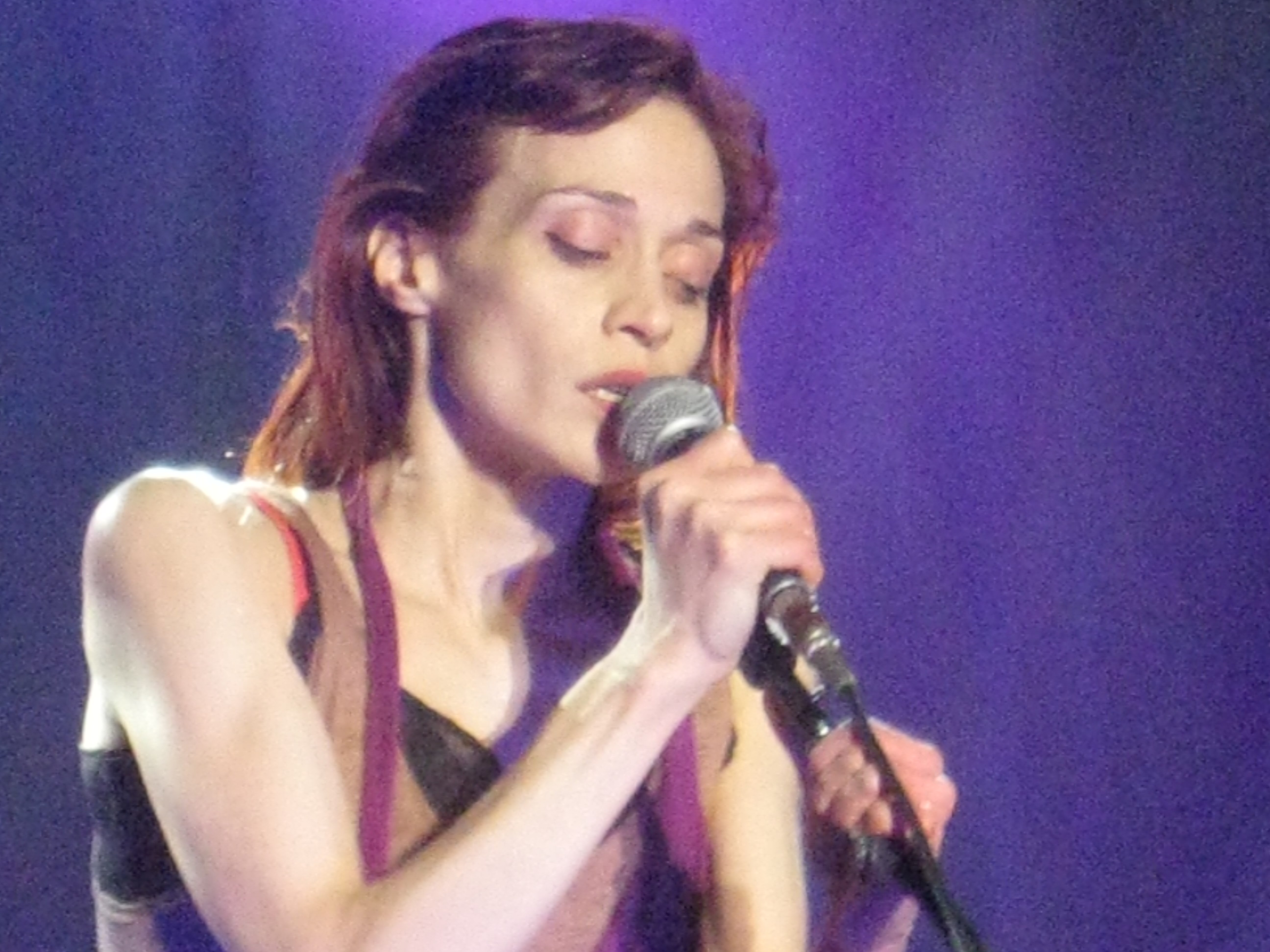
Apple at the Hollywood Palladium in 2012 on The Idler Wheel... tour.

Apple has collaborated with Andrew Bird, and in 2016 she was featured in the song "Left Handed Kisses" from the album Are You Serious. In September 2017, Apple played rarities at the Ohana Festival in Dana Point, California. Also in 2017, she released "Tiny Hands" for the Women's March on Washington. In 2018, she joined Shirley Manson at the female-driven Girl School Festival in Los Angeles for a cover of "You Don't Own Me" by Lesley Gore, wearing a white T-shirt with "KNEEL, PORTNOW" written across it. This was considered a response to Grammy head Neil Portnow's heavily criticized comments that women need to "step up" to earn more Grammy nods.

=== 2019–present: Fetch the Bolt Cutters ===
In January 2019, Apple collaborated with King Princess on a version of her 1999 song "I Know". The song was released for Spotify's RISE program on January 25. Apple was featured in the documentary and soundtrack for Echo in the Canyon with Jakob Dylan covering songs by artists such as the Beach Boys and the Byrds. In November, she covered "Whole of the Moon," a Waterboys song, for the series finale of Showtime's The Affair.

In two Instagram posts in March 2019, Apple hinted at the recording of a fifth album. In a September 2019 interview with Vulture, she confirmed that the album was in its final stages, recorded with a band and planned for an early 2020 release. In a follow-up interview with Vulture in January 2020, she said her new album would likely be out "in a few months." On March 8, 2020, Apple posted a video of herself fingerspelling the phrase "M-Y-R-E-C-O-R-D-I-S-D-O-N-E". In an interview with The New Yorker, it was announced that the album was to be titled Fetch the Bolt Cutters. The album, which consists of 13 self-produced tracks, was released digitally on April 17, 2020. The album was met with widespread acclaim by music critics. At the 63rd Annual Grammy Awards, the album won Best Alternative Music Album and the lead single "Shameika" won Best Rock Performance.

On June 17, 2020, Apple was confirmed as an additional musician featuring on Bob Dylan's 39th album Rough and Rowdy Ways, playing piano on the track "Murder Most Foul". On April 15, 2021, Apple covered Sharon Van Etten's "Love More", from the 10th anniversary of Van Etten's second album, Epic. In December, she was featured on a cover of the Christmas classic "Silent Night" released by Phoebe Bridgers alongside her Christmas EP If We Make It Through December. Apple joined Bear McCreary to perform his composition "Where the Shadows Lie", the end credits theme for "Alloyed", the final episode of the first season of The Lord of the Rings: The Rings of Power. The song features Apple singing the Ring Verse, part of which is inscribed upon the One Ring in Black Speech.

In March 2025, she featured on The Waterboys' single "Letter from an Unknown Girlfriend" from their album Life, Death and Dennis Hopper. On April 25, 2025, Apple covered Neil Young's "Heart of Gold" as part of the tribute album Heart Of Gold: The Songs Of Neil Young Volume I. On May 7, she released "Pretrial (Let Her Go Home)", a protest song against the impact of cash bail on working-class families inspired by her time as a volunteer court watcher. She produced the title sequence track for the 2026 television miniseries Lucky.

== Musical style and influences ==
Apple has a contralto vocal range. Her music has been called art pop, baroque pop, chamber pop, art rock, alternative rock, and jazz pop. According to Stephen Thomas Erlewine of AllMusic, her "roots lay in jazz, show tunes, and classic '70s singer/songwriters, [a] blend that came into sharper focus on her second album, When the Pawn."

== Philanthropy ==
On June 30, 2019, Apple pledged to donate two years' worth of earnings from TV and movie placements of her song "Criminal" to the While They Wait fund, which assists refugees with basic necessities, immigration fees, and legal services. In 2020, While They Wait's Scott Hechinger told Vulture that Apple had donated $90,000, which would help 15 families. Since 2021, Apple has been a volunteer court watcher for Courtwatch PG. In June 2020, she pledged to donate two years' worth of earnings from TV and movie placements of her song "Shameika" to the Harlem Children's Zone.

== Political views and activism ==
Apple is known for her liberal political views.

In August 2020, Apple narrated a video produced by Brooklyn Defender Services, We Have Rights, and WITNESS about how to document raids and arrests by Immigration and Customs Enforcement (ICE). The video sought to educate immigrants and bystanders on their rights during ICE actions and how to document them. Apple told Vulture about how she got involved in the project, saying:

ICE agents are fucking scary. I think so many people want to help and they don't know how. They feel like they have no way of helping. But if you've got eyes, ears, a notepad, and a pencil, you can help. But you have to know the rules to be able to help.

On May 7, 2025, Apple released the single "Pretrial (Let Her Go Home)", inspired by her experiences as a volunteer court watcher with CourtWatch PG and Free Black Mamas DMV Bailout.

== Discography ==
- Tidal (1996)
- When the Pawn... (1999)
- Extraordinary Machine (2005)
- The Idler Wheel... (2012)
- Fetch the Bolt Cutters (2020)

== Concert tours ==
- Tidal Tour (1996–1998)
- When the Pawn Tour (1999–2000)
- The Extraordinary Machine Tour (2005–2006)
- The Idler Wheel Tour (2012)
- Anything We Want Tour with Blake Mills (2013–2014)

== Awards and nominations ==
Apple's debut album earned her a Grammy Award for Best Female Rock Vocal Performance for "Criminal" and the MTV Video Music Award for Best New Artist in a Video for "Sleep to Dream". For When the Pawn..., Apple won the California Music Award for Outstanding Female Vocalist. For Extraordinary Machine, she won an Esky Music Award for Best Songbird. Fetch the Bolt Cutters won a Grammy Award for Best Alternative Music Album and the song "Shameika" won a Grammy Award for Best Rock Performance.

== See also ==
- List of people from Harlem

Awards and achievements
Preceded by Alanis Morissette	MTV Video Music Award for Best New Artist; 1997	Succeeded by Natalie Imbruglia
