= Sleep to Dream =

Single by Fiona Apple

from the album Tidal
- B-side: "Never Is a Promise"
- Released: February 25, 1997
- Recorded: 1996
- Studio: Ocean Way Recording (Los Angeles, California)
- Length: 4:10
- Label: Work; Columbia
- Songwriter: Fiona Apple
- Producer: Andrew Slater

Fiona Apple singles chronology
"Slow Like Honey" (1996)	"Sleep to Dream" (1997)	"Criminal" (1997)

Music video
- "Sleep to Dream" on YouTube

"Sleep to Dream" is a song written and recorded by American alternative singer-songwriter Fiona Apple. It was released on February 25, 1997 by Work Records and Columbia Records as the second single from her debut studio album, Tidal.

The song's accompanying music video was filmed by French director Stéphane Sednaoui and received positive reviews. Apple won the MTV Video Music Award for Best New Artist in a Video at the 1997 MTV Video Music Awards, in which she garnered worldwide controversy after she proclaimed during her acceptance speech: "This world is bullshit, and you shouldn't model your life about what we think is cool, and what we're wearing and what we're saying." Despite peaking at only number 28 on the Billboard Alternative Songs chart, the song remains one of Apple's most successful singles to date.

== Background and release ==
"Sleep to Dream" was reportedly Fiona Apple's first lyric, penned when she was 14. She recorded the song with collaborator Jon Brion in 1995 immediately after being signed to a record deal with Sony Music Entertainment. It was later released as the third single from Tidal. Apple performed "Sleep to Dream" in various events, notably on the television special MTV Unplugged: Fiona Apple. A live version recorded at the SXSW appears on the deluxe version of Apple's fourth studio album, The Idler Wheel... (2012).

== Chart performance and critical reception ==
The song peaked at number 28 on the Billboard Alternative Songs chart on the week ending April 26, 1997, and spent 13 weeks there. It also peaked at number 84 on the UK Singles Chart (number 79 on the compressed chart, with exclusions below number 75), becoming Apple's first song to chart in the United Kingdom. "Sleep to Dream" has also received critical acclaim from music critics. Christopher John Farley of Time wrote: "In "Sleep to Dream", she assumes a smoldering anger that comes off like a muted Alanis Morissette." People magazine also remarked: "A sort of hybrid of Alanis Morissette and Nina Simone—part rebellious rocker and part sultry jazz singer—Apple comes on tough in songs like "Sleep to Dream," a slow, smoldering tune in which she kisses off a reluctant lover ("You say love is a hell you cannot bear/And I say gimme mine back and then go there, for all I care")."

American R&B singer Macy Gray tried to cover the song, but found difficulty doing it instead. She remarked "her songs are so moody, and if you take it out of that it doesn't sound right." American rapper Kanye West also expressed enthusiasm over the song's lyrical content, saying: "one of my favorite opening lines to a song... "I have never been so insulted in all my life!" American soul singer Bettye LaVette's studio album I've Got My Own Hell to Raise (2005) is titled after a lyric of "Sleep to Dream", which also includes a cover of the song.

== Music video ==
The music video was directed by French director Stéphane Sednaoui and was released in February 1997. It features Apple singing in different rooms in an apartment, all the while suffering from insomnia.

=== 1997 MTV Video Music Awards acceptance speech controversy ===
Apple won the MTV Video Music Award for Best New Artist in a Video for the video at the 1997 MTV Video Music Awards on September 4, 1997, where she was presented by Elton John. During her acceptance speech, Apple was quoted saying:

"I didn't prepare a speech and I'm sorry. But I'm glad that I didn't, because I'm not going to do this like everybody else does it. 'Cause everybody that I should be thanking, I'm really sorry, but I have to use this time. See Maya Angelou said that we, we as human beings, at our best can only create opportunities, and I'm going to use this opportunity the way I want to use it. So what I want to say is everybody out there that's watching, everybody that's watching this world. This world is bullshit! And you shouldn't model your life—wait a second—you shouldn't model your life about what you think that we think is cool, and what we're wearing and what we're saying and everything. Go with yourself. Go with yourself."

She ended her speech thanking her mother, her sister (Maude Maggart) and Andrew Slater (the song's producer). She said to the audience "It's just stupid that I'm in this world. But you're all very cool to me. So thank you very much." Immediately after ending her speech, host Chris Rock remarked: "Let's hear it for Fiona X!" The speech was initially greeted with applause and cheer from the audience. However, it received condemnation from most of the press media around the world, with some of them, such as The New Yorker and NYRock, deemed it to be "ungrateful" and "ridiculous".

The incident became one of the controversial moments in VMA history, and a career-defining moment for Apple. However, she never apologized for the matter. In an interview with the Rolling Stone on January 22, 1998, Apple responded by saying: "I just had something on my mind and I just said it. And that's really the foreshadowing of my entire career and my entire life. When I have something to say, I'll say it." In an interview with New York magazine in June 2012, Apple remarked what happened after the incident: "When I walked backstage, I was proud of myself. And they gave me the silent treatment! They pretended I wasn't there! It was the moment I learned that they needed me more than I need them. It was one of the best things I've ever done."

== Track listing ==
CD single

1. "Sleep to Dream" (edit) – 3:48
2. "Sleep to Dream" (album version) – 4:08

7" vinyl single

1. "Sleep to Dream"
2. "Never Is a Promise"
3. "Sullen Girl" (live)
4. "Pale September" (live)

== Personnel ==
Personnel taken from Tidal liner notes.

- Fiona Apple – vocals, piano
- Jon Brion – guitars, vibraphone, tack piano
- Matt Chamberlain – drums, percussion
- Dan Rothchild – bass guitar
- Patrick Warren – piano, Chamberlin

== Charts ==
Chart (1997)	Peak position
Canada Top Singles (RPM)	78
Scottish Singles Sales (Official Charts)	75
UK Singles Chart	79
US Alternative Airplay (Billboard)	28

== Release history ==
Country	Date	Format	Label	Catalog
United States	February 25, 1997	Contemporary hit radio	Work, Columbia	
United States	April 14, 1997	CD, Vinyl	Work, Columbia	
United Kingdom	April 14, 1997	CD, Vinyl	Columbia	
