= Tidal (album) =

Studio album by Fiona Apple
- Released: July 23, 1996
- Recorded: 1995–1996
- Studios: Sony (Los Angeles); Ocean Way (Hollywood); 4th Street, Los Angeles
- Genres: Chamber pop; jazz pop; alternative pop
- Length: 51:31
- Labels: WORK; Columbia; Clean Slate
- Producer: Andrew Slater

Fiona Apple chronology
Tidal (1996)	When the Pawn... (1999)

Singles from Tidal
- 1. "Shadowboxer" Released: July 1, 1996; 2. "Sleep to Dream" Released: February 25, 1997; 3. "Criminal" Released: June 2, 1997

Tidal is the debut studio album by American singer-songwriter Fiona Apple, released on July 23, 1996, by The WORK Group. Tidal produced three singles: "Shadowboxer", "Sleep to Dream", and "Criminal". The last was the album's most popular single, winning a Grammy Award for Best Female Rock Vocal Performance in 1998. In 2017, Tidal got its first vinyl run as a "Vinyl Me Please" exclusive "Record of the Month".

== Background ==
In 1995, Los Angeles music producer Andy Slater signed Apple under the Work Group, a Sony Music label. Upon meeting her, he thought a prank was being pulled on him after seeing how, Apple, a visibly young woman, wrote much of her early work, stating that he thought "it was a Milli Vanilli thing." Later commenting in 2000 on what became Tidal, Apple said that the album "was more for the sake of proving myself; telling people from my past something. And to also try to get friends for the future."

== Composition ==
Tidal has been described as chamber pop, jazz pop and alternative pop. Ilana Kaplan of Consequence described Tidal as a "post-genre masterpiece", blending "everything from jazz and alt-rock to pop".

== Critical reception ==
Professional ratings
Review scores
Source	Rating
AllMusic	4/5 stars
Christgau's Consumer Guide	(neither)
Encyclopedia of Popular Music	4/5 stars
The Guardian	4/5 stars
Los Angeles Times	3/4 stars
The Philadelphia Inquirer	3/4 stars
Pitchfork	9.0/10
PopMatters	9/10
Q	4/5 stars
The Rolling Stone Album Guide	3/5 stars

Tidal garnered generally positive reviews from contemporary music critics, with Jenny Eliscu of Rolling Stone and Richard Harrington of The Washington Post describing it as a mature effort comparable to the work of artists Alanis Morissette and Tori Amos. In a more negative review, The Sydney Morning Herald found the album to be produced out of a "gender cliché," specifically criticizing the lyricism of the track "Criminal" to be too "fragile."

Retrospective reviews have lauded the album. In a 2017 Pitchfork review by Jenn Pelly, Tidal was described as lyrically stating "You could never feel the pain I feel because only I have felt it. There are things about me that you can't see at all, because I have buried them so well. You don't know who I am," and to the contrary, that the listener could see themselves. A 2021 Consequence piece by Ilana Kaplan remarked that the work "inarguably recast what pop stardom could look like" and paved the way for future artists to become forthright and relentless in their artistic conception, whereas Lindsay Zoladz wrote in NPR that in spite of record label executives and the media attempting to forcefully shape Apple's increasingly anti-commercial sound, her later career would continue to follow herself on Tidal "forging the tools of her own liberation in the generative fires of youth" by further growing into an even more free-spirited artist.

In 2010, Rolling Stone ranked the album at number 83 among the 100 greatest albums of the 1990s. The following year, Slant Magazine placed it at number 74. The album is featured in the book 1001 Albums You Must Hear Before You Die. In 2022, Rolling Stone ranked the album at number 25 on its list of "100 Best Debut Albums of All Time", stating that it was "just the beginning—and Apple has kept topping herself artistically ever since."

== Track listing ==
All tracks are written by Fiona Apple.

No.	Title	Length
1.	"Sleep to Dream"	4:08
2.	"Sullen Girl"	3:54
3.	"Shadowboxer"	5:24
4.	"Criminal"	5:41
5.	"Slow Like Honey"	5:56
6.	"The First Taste"	4:46
7.	"Never Is a Promise"	5:54
8.	"The Child Is Gone"	4:14
9.	"Pale September"	5:50
10.	"Carrion"	5:43
Total length:		51:31

== Personnel ==
Musicians

- Fiona Apple – vocals (all tracks), piano (1–3, 5–9), Optigan (2)
- Jon Brion – vibraphone (1–3, 5–6, 9–10), guitar (1–2, 6, 10), tack piano (1, 3, 6, 9), marimba (2, 6), dulcitone (2), Chamberlin (4, 10), harp (8, 10), Optigan (8)
- Patrick Warren – Chamberlin (1–3, 5–6, 8–10), piano (1, 4)
- Greg Leisz – pedal steel guitar (2, 8)
- Rob Laufer – guitar (4)
- Dan Rothchild – bass (1, 4, 8, 10)
- Greg Richling – bass guitar (2–3, 5)
- Sara Lee – bass guitar (6, 9)
- Matt Chamberlain – drums (1–2, 4, 6, 8–10), percussion (1, 6, 10)
- Danny Frankel – drums (3, 5), percussion (6)
- George Black – drum programming (6)
- Van Dyke Parks – string arrangement (7)
  - Ralph Morrison – first violin
  - Claudia Parducci – second violin
  - Evan Wilson – viola
  - Larry Corbett – cello
- Amber Maggart – harmony vocals (9)

Production

- Andrew Slater – production
- Mark Endert – recording, mixing
- Claude "Swifty" Achille – additional engineering
- Brian Scheuble – additional engineering
- Jim Wirt – additional engineering
- Niko Bolas – additional engineering
- Troy Gonzalez – assistant engineering
- Al Sanderson – assistant engineering
- Tom Banghart – mixing assistance
- Ted Jensen – mastering
- Valerie Pack – production coordination
- Nathaniel Goldberg – photography
- Fred Woodward – art direction

== Charts ==
=== Weekly charts ===
Chart	Peak position
Australian Albums (ARIA)	43
Belgian Albums (Ultratop Wallonia)	48
French Albums (SNEP)	21
New Zealand Albums (RMNZ)	22
Scottish Albums (Official Charts)	89
US Billboard 200	15
US Heatseekers Albums (Billboard)	2
US Indie Store Album Sales (Billboard)	16

=== Year-end charts ===
Chart (1997)	Position
US Billboard 200	41
Chart (1998)	Position
US Billboard 200	98

== Certifications and sales ==
Region	Certification	Certified units/sales
Canada (Music Canada)	Platinum	100,000^{^}
France (SNEP)	Gold	100,000^{*}
United Kingdom (BPI) 2023 release	Silver	60,000^{‡}
United States (RIAA)	3× Platinum	2,900,000
^{*} Sales figures based on certification alone.^{^} Shipments figures based on certification alone.^{‡} Sales+streaming figures based on certification alone.
