= Stephanie Storey =

American novelist

- Born: Stephanie Storey; U.S.
- Education: Vanderbilt University (BFA); Emerson College (MFA); Washington University in St. Louis (PhD)
- Occupations: Art historian; actress; producer; screenwriter; director; editor; cinematographer; novelist
- Years active: 2000–present
- Spouse: Mike Gandolfi (m. 2004)

Stephanie Storey is an American actress, producer, screenwriter, director, editor, cinematographer, and novelist. She is the author of Oil and Marble, which was followed by Raphael, Painter in Rome. She is perhaps best known for producing the television series, The Writers' Room.

== Early life and background ==
When she was a child, her parents drove the family from coast to coast in a motorhome. When she was eighteen, she went to Europe with a traveling choir. She has snorkeled the Great Barrier Reef and hiked to a glacier on the south coast of Iceland.

She attended Lakeside High School in Hot Springs, Arkansas and graduated in 1993.

Stephanie Storey achieved cum laude and received a Bachelor of Arts in Fine Arts from Vanderbilt University. While at Vanderbilt, she did a semester abroad at Universita di Pisa, studying art and Italian. Storey then went on to receive a Master of Fine Arts in Creative Writing from Emerson College. She attended a Ph.D. program in Art History at Washington University in St. Louis. She has taken classes in screenwriting, fiction, and literature at UCLA Extension. She has been an acting student at Actors Workout Studio, Actors Creative Workshop, and the Elephant Theater.

She has lived in Arkansas, Nashville, Tennessee, Boston, Massachusetts, and St. Louis, Missouri.

== Career ==
For over 15 years, Stephanie Storey has produced over one thousand episodes of national television for networks such as, CBS, ABC, NBC, FOX, PBS, Comedy Central, Oxygen, Sundance, E!, MSNBC. The shows she has written have won NAACP Awards and she has been nominated for a Primetime Emmy Award. She has produced feature films, award-winning documentaries, and new media projects written by Emmy winners and starring talent from series and networks such as The Daily Show, MTV, and Comedy Central.

She is best known as the producer of the first season of The Writers’ Room, with Jim Rash for Sundance, which was nominated for an Emmy for the Breaking Bad episode.

Storey was also the Senior Producer at The Tavis Smiley Show on PBS for eight years. The show produced interviews with politicians, actors, writers, musicians, athletes, scholars, newsmakers, and other visionaries.

She was the Coordinating Producer for the development and relaunch of The Arsenio Hall Show in 2013 for CBS. The premiere week had the highest ratings for any launch of any syndicated talk show in seven years.

As a consulting producer for the first days of development, Storey was the producer of Will Gray’s award-winning documentary about the music industry, entitled Broke.

In 2014, Storey wrote and produced a PBS documentary for narrator, Nick Clooney, in his journey across five classic Hollywood musicals.

Recently, Storey produced and directed the web series Don't Make Me Sick, written by Emmy and Golden Globe Award-winning writer and also her husband, Mike Gandolfi. Other actors in the series include stars and talent from Gilmore Girls, The Daily Show, and The Office.

For both seasons of the series, Storey was one of the producers on Lewis Black’s Root of All Evil, on Comedy Central, where she worked with comics such as Patton Oswalt, Paul F. Tompkins, Andy Kindler, Andy Daly, and Greg Giraldo.

She was also the producer for the Remaking America and Made Visible symposiums, which were filmed at George Washington University and aired on C-SPAN and PBS. Featured panelists included Secretary of Labor Hilda Solis, documentarian Michael Moore, wealth expert Suze Orman, and the president of AFL-CIO, Randi Weingarten.

She has produced projects on almost every lot in Hollywood including, Warner Brothers, Paramount, Sony, Fox, NBC Burbank, KTLA, Sunset-Bronson, Sunset-Gower, Raleigh, KCET, Tribune, Encompass, CBS Television City, CBS Radford, Hollywood Center, and Nick on Sunset.

Storey has also produced segments at NASA’s Kennedy Space Center, and from the International Space Station, Democratic and Republican national conventions and debates, and from downtown New Orleans just two days after Hurricane Katrina.

As a news producer, she has covered such events as the death of Osama bin Laden, Shock and Awe, the election of President Barack Obama, the Great Recession, Arab Spring, Hurricane Katrina, the earthquake in Haiti, among countless others.

She has produced live events at locations around the country, including LA Live in downtown Los Angeles, Lisner Auditorium at George Washington University in Washington, D.C., and the Ebenezer Baptist Church in Atlanta, Georgia. She has produced interviews with politicians, actors, musicians, athletes, authors, artists, professors, CEOs, and newsmakers. She has developed and produced TV shows hosted by Carrie Fisher, governor Jesse Ventura, Candice Bergen, Meghan McCain, Jim Rash, Kevin Nealon, and Lewis Black among others.

Most recently she has written personal pieces for the online news publication, Huffington Post.

== Personal life ==
Stephanie Storey is married to Mike Gandolfi, an actor, writer, producer, stand-up comic, and editor. They were married on Leap Day at Disneyland on February 29, 2004. They were engaged at the Dromoland Castle in County Clare, Ireland. They now reside in Hot Springs, Arkansas.

When publishing her first novel, Storey considered using the pen name "S.G. Storey", partly as a nod to her husband's last name and partly as a way to mask that she was a woman.

She has a niece named Hannah, a goddaughter named Summer, and cousins named Annaleigh, Addie, and Katie.

== Filmography ==
Film
Year	Title	Role	Notes
2008	Extraordinary Proof	Cinematographer/Editor/Writer/Director/Executive Producer	Short
2009	Assassin Nation	Mercenary Recruiter	Video Short
2009	Thanksgiving Seconds	Editor/Writer/Director/Executive Producer	Short
2011	Broke*	Consulting Producer	Documentary

Television
Year	Title	Role	Notes
2000	Exhale with Candice Bergen	Researcher	
2002	The Conspiracy Zone	Segment Producer	
2002	O2Be	Associate Producer	
2004-2011	The Tavis Smiley Show	Producer	
2008	Lewis Black's Root of All Evil	Segment Producer/Secretary	8 episodes/Steroids vs. Boob Jobs
2009	Don't Make Me Sick	Executive Producer/Director/Editor	
2013	The Writers' Room	Producer	All 6 episodes of first season
2013	The Arsenio Hall Show	Coordinating Producer	30 episodes

== Awards and nominations ==
Year	Ceremony	Category	Series	Result
2013	Primetime Emmy Award	Outstanding Informational Series	The Writers' Room	Nominated
2011	Philadelphia Film Festival	Official Selection	Broke*	Won
2011	Nashville Film Festival	Special Jerry Prize	Broke*	Won
2011	CMJ Film Festival	Official Selection	Broke*	Won
2008	NAACP Award	Image Award Outstanding Talk – (Series)	The Tavis Smiley Show	Won
2007	NAACP Award	Image Award Outstanding News, Talk or Information – (Series or Special)	The Tavis Smiley Show	Won
2006	NAACP Award	Image Award Outstanding TV News, Talk or Information (Series)	The Tavis Smiley Show	Won
2005	NAACP Award	Image Award Outstanding Television News, Talk or Information (Series or Special)	The Tavis Smiley Show	Won
