= Mike Gandolfi =

American actor, producer, and writer (born 1962)

- Born: Michael Gandolfi; January 31, 1962 (age 64); San Diego, California, U.S.
- Education: San Diego State University
- Occupations: Stand-up comic, actor, producer, screenwriter
- Years active: 1992–present
- Spouse: Stephanie Storey (2004–present)
- Relatives: Veronica Kinney (great-aunt)

Michael Gandolfi (born January 31, 1962) is an American actor, producer, and writer. He is best known for playing Andrew on the WB drama series, Gilmore Girls, and as a writer on the sitcom Roseanne.

== Early life and background ==
Mike Gandolfi was born on January 31, 1962, in San Diego, California. His grandfather was a Pearl Harbor survivor and years later, he worked on Operation Wigwam and Operation Redwing, which were nuclear tests conducted by the United States military in the Pacific.

His parents were the first couple married at All Hallows Catholic Church in La Jolla, California. Gandolfi was born a Roman Catholic.

When he was in the 10th grade, his high school put on the musical Guys and Dolls. He played one of the gamblers in Nathan Detroit's clan. Casey Nicholaw, the student who choreographed the show and played Nicely-Nicely Johnson, went on to become a prominent theatre choreographer and stage actor. He was nominated for Tony Awards for choreographing Spamalot, The Drowsy Chaperone, and The Book of Mormon, and won a Tony for co-directing The Book of Mormon.

Mike Gandolfi has a bachelor's degree in comparative literature from San Diego State University. He has taken classes at the Magic Castle in Hollywood. He was accepted to a graduate program to receive a Master of Library and Information Science (MLIS) degree, but decided to take improv classes instead.

While in college one December, he worked as a "seasonal employee" at Toys 'R Us. A co-worker of his claimed to be the basis for Jeff Spicoli in Fast Times at Ridgemont High.

== Career ==
Mike Gandolfi is an Emmy, Peabody, and Golden Globe Award–winning television writer, who has written for the television series, Roseanne, Veronica's Closet, and Dennis Miller Live. While on staff at Roseanne, Gandolfi co-wrote the 100th episode, "The Dark Ages'", which was nominated for a Writers Guild Award. As of 2016, he has two feature films in development, with producers, directors, and talent attached. In addition, he had a recurring role as Andrew throughout most seasons of the Warner Brothers' television series, Gilmore Girls, with a role he reprised in the Netflix revival of the series.

He has trained at many improv, comedy, and acting schools including, Upright Citizens Brigade, Groundlings, IO West, Nerdist, Chris Game, Miles Stroth Workshop, Actors Workout Studio, Anthony Meindl's Actor Workshop, Elizabeth Mestnik Acting Studio, and the Magic Castle.

Mike started his career as a stand-up comic, performing in comedy clubs across the country and working with such acclaimed comedians as Jay Leno, Jerry Seinfeld, Roseanne Barr, and Tom Arnold. He has performed stand-up at many places all over the country including improv in Hollywood, San Francisco, and San Diego. He has also performed at The Comedy Store in Hollywood and La Jolla, California, the Great American Music Hall in San Francisco, Zanies in Chicago, The Fillmore in San Francisco, the Comedy Gallery in Minneapolis, and The Comedy Connection in Boston.

He was one of the original writers for the Air America radio network.

While writing for Roseanne, one of the other writers on the series was Amy Sherman-Palladino. She went on to create Gilmore Girls, in which he played a recurring role throughout the series.

He is a member of the Screen Actors Guild, American Federation of Television and Radio Artists, and Writers Guild of America.

== Personal life ==
He is married to Stephanie Storey, an actress, writer, producer, cinematographer, director, and editor. She is now the author of her debut novel, Oil and Marble. She is perhaps best known for producing the television series, The Writers' Room. They were married on Leap Day at Disneyland on February 29, 2004. They were engaged at the Dromoland Castle in County Clare, Ireland. They now reside in Sherman Oaks, California.

In 1993, on the episode, First Cousin, Twice Removed, on the series Roseanne, the cousin, played by Joan Collins, was named Ronnie. When the writers were tossing around names for the character, Gandolfi said, "Veronica – Ronnie," which was the one used in the episode. He co-wrote the episode, "The Kiss Is the Thing", for the animated show, Life with Louie. The character voiced by actress, Laurie Metcalf, was named Miss Kinney. Both of these characters were named after real people that Gandolfi personally knew. His great-aunt was named Veronica Kinney. Veronica was his father's mother's sister. She never had children and lived about five blocks from Gandolfi as a child and became very close to him. She encouraged him to be a writer. The year after she died he was hired as a writer for the television series, Veronica's Closet.

As hobbies he plays taekwondo, ice hockey, and improv comedy. Gandolfi has a Black Belt in taekwondo from Beverly Hills Martial Arts. He has run, and finished, the Los Angeles Marathon twice. He has taken four yoga teacher trainings, but has never actually taught a yoga class.

== Filmography ==
Film
Year	Title	Role	Notes
1994	Writing for Hollywood: The Act of Breaking In	Himself	Documentary
2008	Extraordinary Proof	Michael Bell/Executive Producer	Short
2009	Thanksgiving Seconds	Uncle Al/Executive Producer	Short
2015	The Interrogation	Officer 2	Short
2015	The Eating Place	Jim Calhoun	Short
2015	Suburban Gothic	Lead	
2015	Stranger Danger	Lead	Student Short Film

Television
Year	Title	Role	Notes
1992	Mystery Science Theater 3000	Contributing Writer	2 episodes
1992	Free to Laugh: A Comedy and Music Special for Amnesty International	Writer	TV special
1992–1994	Roseanne	Writer/Teleplay Writer/Story Editor	27 episodes
1994	Tom	The Chicken	He's Heavy, He's My Brother
1995	The Lemur	Series Regular/Executive Producer/Co-creator	
1995	Apartment C	Series Regular/Writer	
1995	Can't Hurry Love	Consultant	
1994–1996	Later	Writer	7 episodes, with Greg Kinnear
1996	Dennis Miller Live	Writer	9 episodes
1996	Love and Marriage	Executive Story Editor	1 episode
1996	State of the Union: Undressed	Creative Consultant	TV movie
1996	Bunk Bed Brothers	Writer	TV movie
1997	Over the Top	Co-producer/Writer	12 episodes
1997–1998	Veronica's Closet	Producer/Writer	3 episodes
1997–1998	Life with Louie	Teleplay Writer	2 episodes
2000–2005	Gilmore Girls	Andrew	20 episodes
2001	The Test	Producer	Series
2002	O2Be	Consulting Producer	Series
2004	Super Secret Movie Rules	Guest	
2005–2006	Mr. Romance	Creative Consultant	6 episodes
	We're the Jasons	Gary	Featured
	The Jasons' Writers' Room	Frank	Supporting
	Bravo & Company	Police Chief	Supporting
	Earth Angel	Bob	Supporting
2009	Don't Make Me Sick	Dr. Kevin Carr/Writer/Executive Producer	8 episodes, Web Series
2010	The Arena with Jesse Ventura	Guest	
2011	Goon Squad	Host	Pilot
2016	Gilmore Girls: A Year in the Life	Andrew	4 90-minute episodes, Netflix revival

== Awards and nominations ==
Year	Ceremony	Category	Series	Result
1997	Writers Guild of America	Writers Guild of America Award for Best Comedy/Variety – (Including Talk) Series – Television	Dennis Miller Live	Nominated
1996	Emmy Award	Outstanding Writing for a Variety or Music Program	Dennis Miller Live	Won
1994	Writers Guild of America	Writers Guild of America Award for Television: Episodic Comedy		Nominated
1992	Golden Globe Award	Best Television Series Musical or Comedy	Roseanne	Won
1992	Peabody Award	Peabody Award		Won
