= Writers' room (disambiguation) =

A writers' room is a room where TV scripts are created.

Writers' room may also refer to:

- The Writers' Room, an American TV talk show
- The Writers Room, a workspace in New York co-founded by Nancy Milford
