= Lizz Winstead =

American comedian (born 1961)

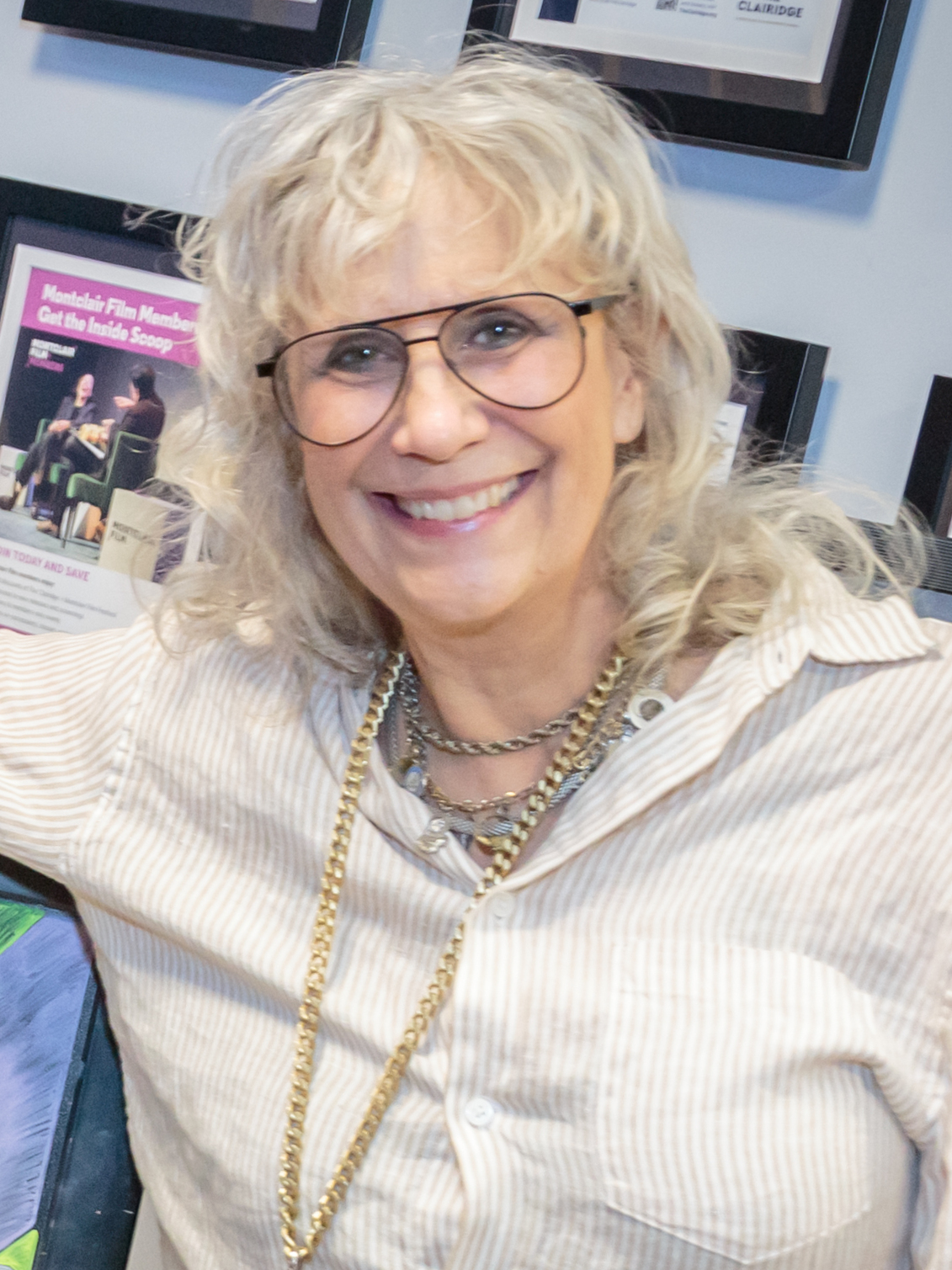
- Winstead in 2024
- Born: July 5, 1961 (age 64); Minneapolis, Minnesota, U.S.
- Occupation: Comedian
- Years active: 1983–present

Lizz Winstead (born July 5, 1961) is an American comedian, radio and television personality, abortion rights activist, and podcast host. A native of Minnesota, Winstead is the co-creator of The Daily Show along with Madeleine Smithberg, and served as head writer and one of the original correspondents. Winstead is the founder and chief creative officer of Abortion Access Front, a nonprofit made up of “activists, writers and producers and comedians that uses humor to destigmatize abortion” and fight against anti-abortion forces nationwide.

== Early life ==
Winstead was the youngest child born into a conservative Catholic family in Minneapolis, Minnesota.

== Career ==
Winstead made her standup comedy debut in 1983 in Minneapolis at the Brave New Workshop. She was a national headlining comedian appearing on shows like HBO's Women of the Night and the Aspen Comedy Festival. She wrote and performed for early Comedy Central shows like Women Aloud, and produced the syndicated talk series The Jon Stewart Show, starring the future Daily Show host. She also created Court TV's Snap Judgment and served as the consulting producer on the pilot of The Man Show.

During her time at The Daily Show she helped staff the program with signature talents like Stephen Colbert, Beth Littleford, Brian Unger, and Lewis Black. After Daily Show host Craig Kilborn publicly made offensive remarks about Winstead, she left the show in January 1998.

Winstead has appeared on various shows on CNN and MSNBC. In 2002, she and Brian Unger created, wrote and co-hosted O2Be, a satire of network morning programs that was broadcast on the Oxygen network.

In 2003, she co-founded and served as the program director at Air America Radio. Until March 2005, she was also co-host of Unfiltered on Air America Radio, along with Rachel Maddow and Chuck D.

In 2006, she served as the executive producer of the Weekends with Maury and Connie program on MSNBC. The show was canceled later that year and in the last episode Connie Chung performed a musical number with lyrics by Winstead that was called "Thanks for the Memories." Since 2007, she has produced and hosted a live show in New York City called Shoot the Messenger, a satirical wrap-up of the week's news as seen through the eyes of six-hour morning show Wake Up World, and featuring interviews with such media notables as Rachel Maddow, Sarah Silverman, Chuck D., Amy Goodman, Susie Essman, Jerry Stiller and Anne Meara.

On May 10, 2012, her first book, Lizz Free or Die, was published by Riverhead Hardcover; it is a collection of autobiographical essays on her life. In 2015, she founded Lady Parts Justice League, a 501(c)(3) nonprofit that changed its name in 2019 to Abortion Access Front to become more inclusive to people of all genders who need reproductive care. Abortion Access Front is dedicated to using humor to expose anti-abortion forces, support abortion providers, and expand access to abortion in all 50 states.

Winstead co-hosts the Abortion Access Front podcast “Feminist Buzzkills Live!”, which “break[s] down the weekly news from patriarchy’s evil trilogy of misogyny, white supremacy, and anti-abortion extremism.”

On July 17, 2022, a month after Roe v. Wade was overturned, Winstead and Abortion Access Front along with 60 partners launched Operation Save Abortion, an ongoing campaign beginning with a daylong virtual training session for thousands of new abortion rights activists nationwide. Winstead told Cosmopolitan: “They’ll learn about all the different ways they can channel their outrage into action, they’ll come away knowing this fight requires every single one of us, and they’ll know exactly where their special talents fit into that equation.”

According to Winstead, over 10,000 people participated on the first day. Operation Save Abortion maintains an activist toolkit and calendar to help new abortion activists stay involved.
