= Zach Galifianakis Live at the Purple Onion =

- DVD cover
- Written by: Zach Galifianakis
- Directed by: Michael Blieden
- Starring: Zach Galifianakis; Brian Unger; Joe Wagner
- Country of origin: United States
- Original language: English

Production
- Producer: DJ Paul
- Cinematography: Brandon Hickman
- Editor: Michael Blieden
- Running time: 61 minutes (feature); 90 minutes (DVD)
- Production companies: Red Envelope Entertainment; Sixth Way Productions; The Claw (in association with); Anacol Productions Inc.; Billios

Original release
- Network: Funny or Die
- Release: 2006

Live at the Purple Onion is the first special and DVD by American stand-up comedian Zach Galifianakis directed by Michael Blieden. The show was recorded at the San Francisco club The Purple Onion in June 2005.

It was one of the first stand up specials produced by Netflix, through Red Envelope Entertainment, shortly after The Comedians of Comedy, which also featured Zach.

== Synopsis ==
Galifianakis's routine features his trademark dry humor and a large portion of it is accompanied by a light piano piece played by him as bed music. It ends with him tearing off pages of a large pad of paper which contain pre-written, and largely self-deprecating, jokes, while the Pacific Boychoir sings "The Greatest Love of All". The DVD contains two separate sections which are cut to throughout the routine, often at times where the content of the routine may have to do with the content of the other portions. One of the sections is an unscripted roadtrip to The Purple Onion in a Volkswagen Bus with Galifianakis and his friend Joe Wagner. The banter and happenings that occur seem to provide insights to where Galifianakis gets some of his comedy. The bus ends up breaking down just short of their goal so they finish the trip in a GoCar, a small rental vehicle meant for tourists. The second section is a loosely scripted interview of Galifianakis's brother "Seth Galifianakis" (played by Galifianakis) by Brian Unger.
