= Red Envelope Entertainment =

Former film production and distribution unit owned by Netflix

Red Envelope Entertainment LLC
- Founded: 2006; 20 years ago
- Defunct: 2008; 18 years ago
- Headquarters: Los Angeles, California, United States
- Key people: Reed Hastings
- Website: netflix.com

Red Envelope Entertainment LLC (originally Netflix First) was a film production and distribution unit created by Netflix in 2006. The studio produced independent content for the company's DVD-by-mail service. The company produced and/or distributed over 100 films, before ultimately being closed in 2008. The firm cited the closure of the production division, as a result of pressure from partnered film studios, which were competing for rights.

In 2012, Netflix returned to producing original content under its own banner.

== Films distributed ==
- 2 Days in Paris
- 4 Months, 3 Weeks And 2 Days
- Antônia
- Black White + Gray (uncredited)
- Born into Brothels
- Buddha's Lost Children
- The Business of Being Born
- Chevolution
- Confessions of a Superhero
- Dandelion
- Elegy (uncredited)
- Hopeless Pictures
- I Like Killing Flies
- I'm Reed Fish
- Just Another Love Story
- Kicking It
- Love Songs
- Maxed Out
- Mister Foe
- Nice Guys Sleep Alone
- No End in Sight (uncredited)
- Open Hearts
- The Prisoner or: How I Planned to Kill Tony Blair
- Phoebe in Wonderland (uncredited)
- Protagonist
- Puccini for Beginners
- The Puffy Chair
- Reprise
- Running with Arnold
- Sherrybaby
- Steal a Pencil for Me
- Strike
- Super High Me
- This Film is Not Yet Rated
- This Filthy World
- This Is England
- Tony Bennett: The Music Never Ends
- Towelhead (uncredited)
- Trumbo
- Two Days in April
- An Unreasonable Man
- A Very British Gangster
- A Walk Into the Sea: Danny Williams and the Warhol Factory
- You're Gonna Miss Me
- Zach Galifianakis Live at the Purple Onion
