= Snap Judgment (TV program) =

- Genre: Comedy
- Created by: Lizz Winstead
- Written by: Barry Lank; Bruce Cherry; Charles Ezell
- Presented by: Lionel
- Country of origin: United States
- Original language: English
- No. of seasons: 1
- No. of episodes: 130

Production
- Executive producers: Lizz Winstead; Naomi Boak; Emily Benton
- Running time: 30 min

Original release
- Network: CourtTV
- Release: April 1, 1999 – February 25, 2000

Snap Judgment is an American daily legal comedy television program that aired on CourtTV from 1999 to 2000. The program was hosted by commentator Lionel, and was created by Lizz Winstead.

Court TV described it as "an irreverent, satirical and 'judicially incorrect' look at the absurdities that exist in all areas of the legal system."

According to a review in the New York Observer, "Snap Judgment, hosted by the AM radio personality currently known as Lionel, is a novelty for Court TV, a satirical examination of the process it otherwise treats so reverently. The show contains court testimony from absurd lawsuits and profiles of obscure players in the legal profession." According to The New York Times, "Shown on weeknights, the show features Lionel offering sardonic commentary on legal events in the news and video excerpts from trials, often from small-claims courts. An "expert" then joins Lionel in analyzing the cases. One recent case: a fight between two neighbors over injury to a chicken that inspired producers to book the Chicken Man, whose usual job is on-street promotion for poultry dinners."

== Credits ==
- Lizz Winstead – Creator, Executive Producer
- Barry Lank – Head Writer
- Bruce Cherry – Writer
- Charles Ezell – Writer
- Naomi Boak, Emily Benton – Executive Producers
