= A Walk into the Sea: Danny Williams and the Warhol Factory =

- Directed by: Esther B. Robinson
- Written by: Esther B. Robinson; Shannon Kennedy
- Produced by: Esther B. Robinson; Doug Block; Tamra Raven
- Cinematography: Adam Cohen
- Edited by: Shannon Kennedy; James K. Lyons
- Music by: T. Griffin
- Distributed by: Arthouse Films; Red Envelope Entertainment
- Release date: 2007
- Running time: 75 minutes
- Country: United States

A Walk Into the Sea: Danny Williams and the Warhol Factory is a 2007 documentary film directed by Esther B. Robinson. It follows Robinson's inquiry into the truth behind the mysterious 1966 disappearance of her uncle Danny Williams, who was an aspiring filmmaker and Pop artist Andy Warhol's onetime lover.

The film premiered at the Berlin International Film Festival where it won the Teddy Award for best LGBT documentary. It also won the New York Loves Film Award at the Tribeca Film Festival.

== Background ==
In 1965, Danny Williams dropped out of Harvard University to pursue a film career. He moved to New York City, where he met Pop artist Andy Warhol, who had recently retired from painting to focus on filmmaking. Williams fell in love with Warhol and briefly lived with him at his Lexington Avenue townhouse. He worked with Warhol on the films My Hustler (1965) and The Bed (1965). During a heated argument at a restaurant over a screening Williams was trying to arrange for a film he worked on before coming to the Factory, Williams yanked off Warhol's wig.

After Warhol ended their romantic relationship in late 1965, William continued to work with him and lived at the Factory. In 1966, Williams was the lighting technician for the Exploding Plastic Inevitable multimedia events featuring the Velvet Underground. His addiction to amphetamines worsened, and eventually he returned to his family home in Rockport, Massachusetts. On July 26, 1966, Williams went for a drive in his mother's car and never returned. His clothes and the car keys were later discovered near the shore, but his body was never recovered.

== Synopsis ==
Despite never having met Williams, his niece, filmmaker Esther Robinson, was captivated by his story. Her examination of his life, his disappearance, and his significance to Warhol's oeuvre as an avant-garde filmmaker is presented in A Walk Into the Sea. The film incorporates footage of Williams' films with interviews of his relative and members of Warhol's Factory.

== Cast ==
- Brigid Berlin
- Billy Name
- Gerard Malanga
- Paul Morrissey
- John Cale
- Callie Angell
- Albert Maysles
- Nat Finkelstein
- Julia Robinson
- Nadia Williams
- David Williams

== Release ==
A Walk Into the Sea premiered at the 57th Berlin International Film Festival in February 2007. It was also shown at the Hot Docs Canadian International Documentary Festival in Toronto, New York's Tribeca Film Festival, International Documentary Film Festival Amsterdam, and New Zealand International Film Festival.

In 2007, Arthouse Films, in association with Curiously Bright Entertainment and Netflix's Red Envelope Entertainment, acquired North American theatrical and DVD rights to A Walk Into the Sea. The film opened at Cinema Village in Manhattan's Greenwich Village on December 14, 2007.

The film has been screened at various museums and institutions, including the Walker Art Center (2008) in Minneapolis, Institute of Contemporary Arts (2008) in London, Institute of Contemporary Art, Boston (2008), and the Berkeley Art Museum and Pacific Film Archive (2011).

== Critical reception ==
Ryan Gilbey of The Guardian noted hat the documentary proves Williams was "a promising film-maker in his own right."

Nick Schager wrote for Slant Magazine: "Robinson’s doc is an investigation into a mystery with no answer. Interviews with Williams's relatives and former Factory members shed no conclusive light on his vanishing—possibly caused by drug use or depression over being dumped by Warhol—but offer quite a bit of insight into the atmosphere of the Factory, a milieu where collaboration went hand in hand with cutthroat selfishness, and where queen bee Warhol's affection was prone to quickly turn to apathy."

Leslie Felperin, wrote for Variety: "If pic has one major fault, it’s that it errs on the side of discretion and doesn't dig as deep as it might have done into the family dynamics or the wrangle with MOMA over the rights to Danny's films (recounted, curiously in the Berlin Forum catalogue entry, but not onscreen), which the museum had archived. Ultimately, Danny remains a shadowy figure, a structuring absence knowable only by the work he left behind."

A.O. Scott of The New York Times stated that Robinson "does a pretty good job of reconstructing the creative and psychological whirlwind around Warhol," but "Williams himself remains the missing piece, despite clips from 16-millimeter films he shot." Although Robinson interviewed several relatives, including his mother, she "provides little detail about her uncle's life, and virtually nothing about his pre-Warhol existence." He concludes that the film, "one suspects by accident as much as by design, feels tentative and unfinished."

== Awards ==
The film won the Teddy Award for Best Documentary/ Essay Film at the 2007 Berlin International Film Festival. It also won the New York Loves Film Award at the 2007 Tribeca Film Festival. The film was also a winner of the Silver Plaque/Special Jury Prize - Documentary at the Chicago International Film Festival.
