= This Filthy World =

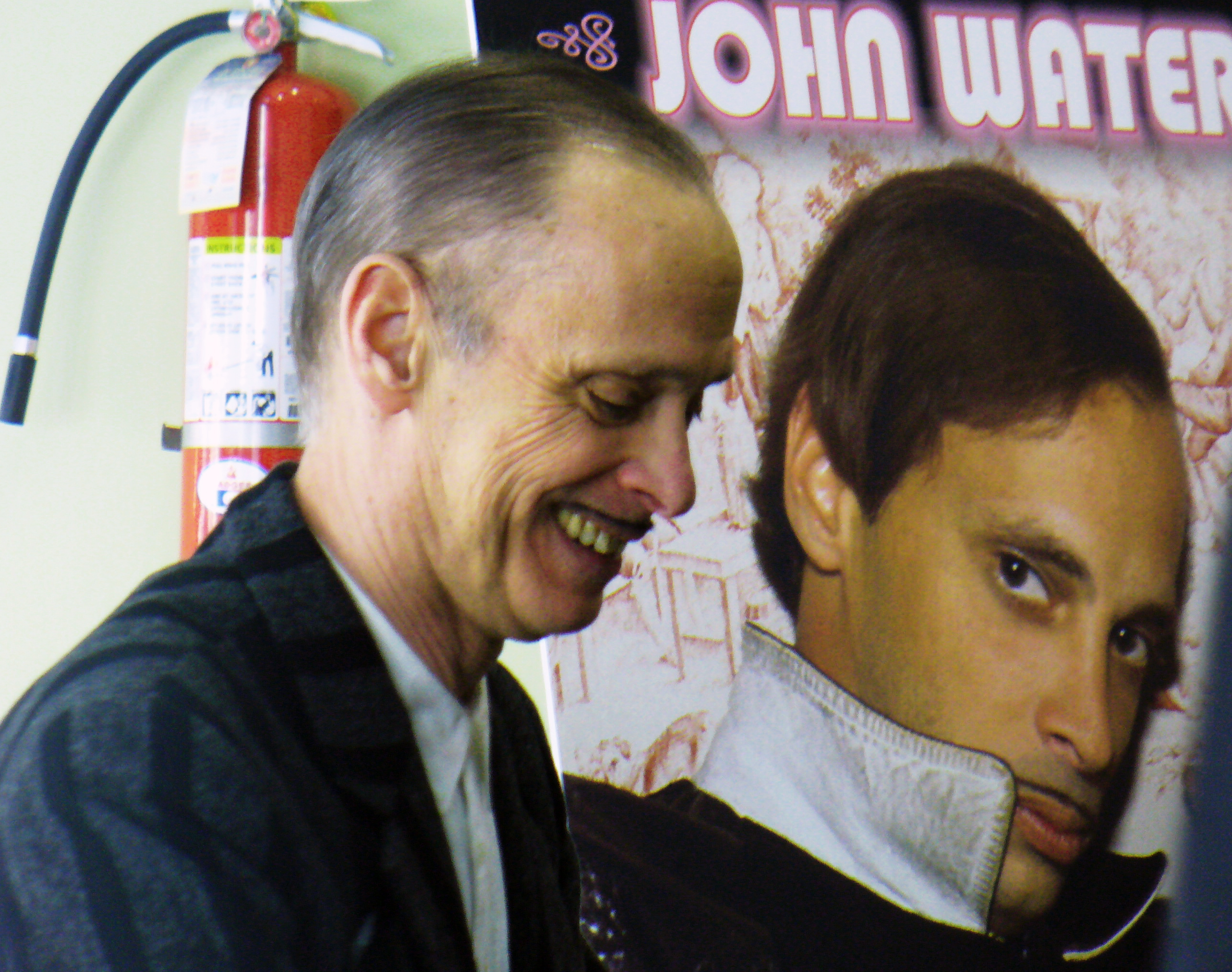
- John Waters
- Directed by: Jeff Garlin
- Written by: John Waters
- Produced by: Jeff Garlin
- Starring: John Waters
- Cinematography: Daniel Shulman
- Edited by: Jared Gustaldt; Rob Naylor
- Music by: Jared Gustaldt; Lukas Kaiser
- Distributed by: Red Envelope Entertainment
- Release date: November 24, 2006
- Running time: 86 minutes
- Country: United States
- Language: English

This Filthy World is a one-man show/documentary film by John Waters about his life and career. A filmed version of the show was directed by Jeff Garlin, recorded at the Harry DeJour Playhouse in New York City in 2006, and released later that year by Red Envelope Entertainment.

Waters has performed a speaking engagement under the title This Filthy World since around 2003, though he frequently updates it to include new anecdotes and references to current events; in 2013, he said that "maybe 2%" of the show's material at that point was the same as the version featured in the film.

== Synopsis ==
Jeff Garlin films a performance of Waters' one-man show. The filmmaker talks for an hour and a half about different subjects that made him into who he is today while standing on a stage decorated with a pile of trash, some roses, and a confessional. Waters starts off by talking about his earliest negative influences. He then begins talking about directors of the macabre that inspired him on what to do with his films. He then talks about filmmaking experiences on each and every one of his films and tells stories about some of the Dreamlanders. He discusses sexual fetishes, court trials he has visited, how to make books cool again, and more. The last topic he speaks of is his hometown of Baltimore and all the things he has experienced there.

== Cast ==
- John Waters as himself

== Reception ==
This Filthy World received positive reviews, currently holding an 92% "fresh" rating on Rotten Tomatoes. On Metacritic, the film has a 68/100 rating, indicating "generally favorable reviews".
