= Jeff Garlin =

American comedian and actor (born 1962)

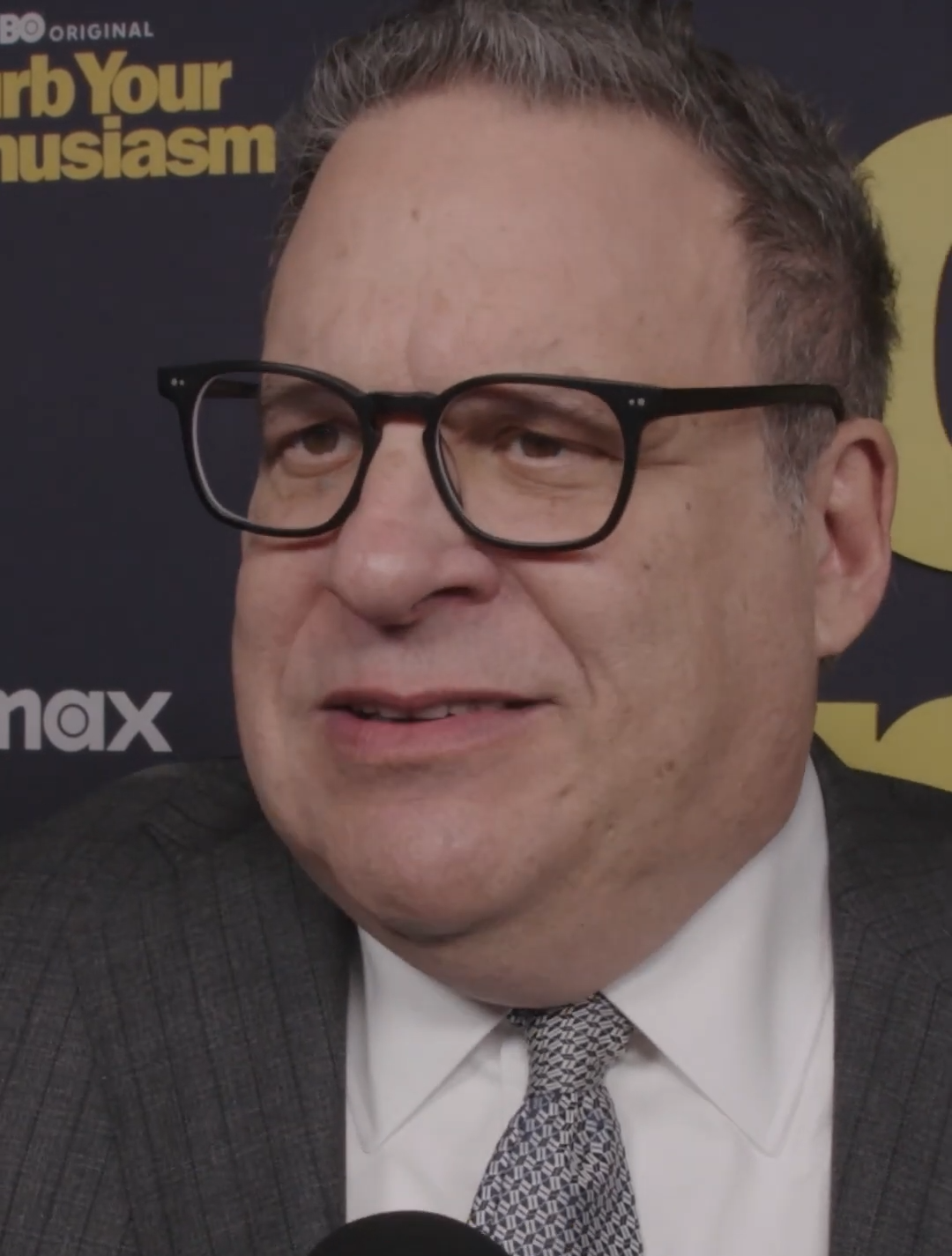
- Garlin in 2024
- Born: June 5, 1962 (age 64); Chicago, Illinois, U.S.
- Spouse: Marla Cahan (m. 1994; div. 2020)
- Children: 2

Comedy career
- Years active: 1983–present
- Medium: Stand-up; television; film
- Genres: Observational comedy; black comedy; satire
- Website: www.jeffgarlin.com

Jeffrey Garlin (born June 5, 1962) is an American stand-up comedian and actor. He played Jeff Greene on the HBO sitcom Curb Your Enthusiasm, and Murray Goldberg, patriarch of the eponymous family in the ABC sitcom The Goldbergs. Garlin also played Marvin on Mad About You and Mort Meyers on Arrested Development for Fox and Netflix.

Garlin has also appeared as Captain B. McCrea in WALL-E, Buttercup in Toy Story 3 and Toy Story 4, Perry Babcock in ParaNorman, and Mr. Britt in Safety Not Guaranteed, among other films.

== Early life and education ==
Garlin was born on June 5, 1962, in Chicago, Illinois, to Gene and Carole (née Crafton) Garlin. He grew up in Morton Grove, Illinois, where his father owned a plumbing supply business called Bilko and his mother was active in community theater. Garlin has a younger brother, Michael. He is Jewish and attended Hebrew school.

Garlin said that he wanted to be a comedian since he was eight after seeing Jimmy Durante perform in Chicago. Garlin attended Melzer Elementary School in Morton Grove. He enjoyed playing sports at school, but had to stop after being diagnosed with Wolff–Parkinson–White syndrome, a heart ailment.

When Garlin was in sixth grade, his father sold his supply business and the family relocated to South Florida. Garlin graduated from Nova High School in Davie, Florida, in 1980. He attended Broward Community College, followed by a stint studying film at the University of Miami, where he first began to perform stand-up comedy. He left Miami without a degree.

== Career ==
=== Standup ===
In 1984, aged 22, Garlin moved back to Chicago to pursue a stand-up comedy career. He performed with the comedy troupe The Second City. Garlin worked in the box office with Stephen Colbert.

While living in Wrigleyville, Chicago during the 1980s, Garlin was briefly roommates with Conan O'Brien, who was then a comedy writer. He remains close to O'Brien, and after O'Brien was removed as host of The Tonight Show in 2010 so that Jay Leno could return, Garlin said that he would not be a guest on the show again.

Garlin was hired by comedians Denis Leary and Jon Stewart to help develop their specials. He worked as a stage director for their shows and edited the scripts. Garlin worked with Larry David in this same way. He continues to do standup, where Garlin says he improvises a lot on stage, and feels very relaxed, "maybe too relaxed."

=== Film and television ===
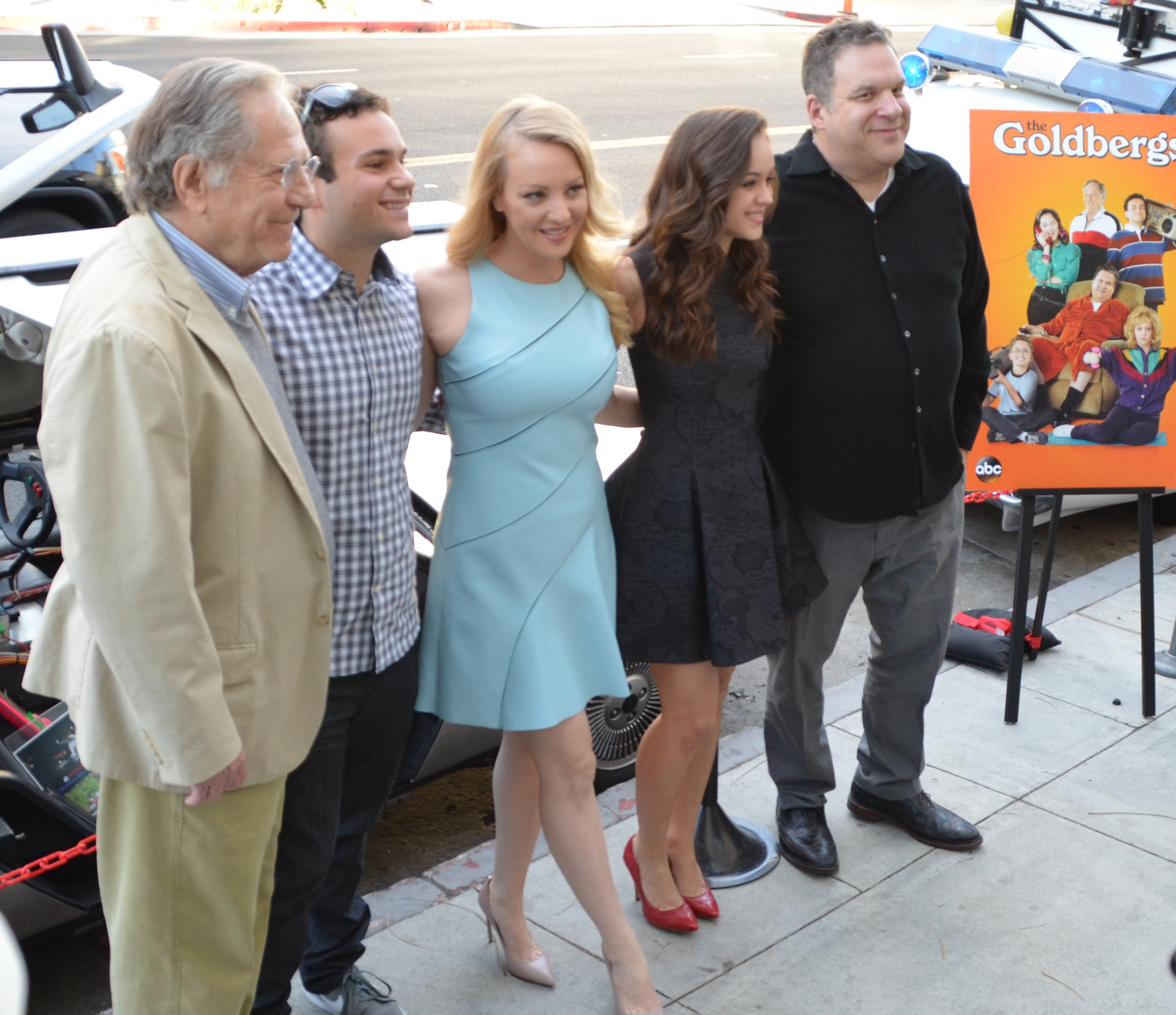
Garlin with his castmates from The Goldbergs in April 2014

Garlin has a variety of television and film appearances to his credit, as an actor and a stand up, including Dr. Katz, Arrested Development, Everybody Loves Raymond, Late Show with David Letterman, Tom Goes to the Mayor, The Life & Times of Tim, The Daily Show, Late Night with Conan O'Brien, and Entourage.

From 1997 to 1999, Garlin spent three seasons on NBC's Mad About You in the role of Marvin. He co-starred in and executive produced the HBO series Curb Your Enthusiasm. Garlin had a recurring role on the series Wizards of Waverly Place as Uncle Kelbo, appearing in three episodes over the first three seasons.

After making an uncredited début as Gut Gut in Spring Break (1983), Garlin earned his first film credit in Dolly Parton's 1992 comedy Straight Talk. Garlin had a small role in RoboCop 3 as "Donut Jerk" after a member of the casting crew saw him eat a doughnut while leaving Krispy Kreme with an additional two dozen doughnuts. Garlin also had a cameo appearance in Austin Powers: The Spy Who Shagged Me in 1999.

Other cameo appearances include Run Ronnie Run!, After the Sunset, Fat Albert, and Sleepover. Garlin appeared in Steven Soderbergh's Full Frontal (2002) and in Daddy Day Care (2003). In 2005, he had a small role in Fun with Dick and Jane.

In 2008, Garlin appeared in The Rocker as Stan, and played Ed Lawson in Strange Wilderness. He lent his voice to the Disney/Pixar films Toy Story 3 and Toy Story 4, as Buttercup. Garlin appeared as Sid, alongside Jennifer Aniston and Gerard Butler, in the 2010 comedy action film The Bounty Hunter. He played Ed Burch in Laggies, released in 2014.

Garlin's feature directorial debut, I Want Someone to Eat Cheese With (which he also wrote), premiered to favorable reviews at the 2006 Tribeca Film Festival. It opened in September 2007. The film co-starred Sarah Silverman and Bonnie Hunt.

In 2006, Garlin directed This Filthy World, a one-man show performed by director John Waters. He was a voice actor in WALL-E (2008), as B. McCrea, the captain of the Axiom spaceship. Garlin executive produced the documentary Finding Vivian Maier (2013).

In 2013, Garlin signed onto the ABC sitcom The Goldbergs, which premiered on September 24, 2013. He played Murray Goldberg, the father of the title family. In December 2021, as shooting of the show's ninth season neared completion, Garlin left the series following misconduct allegations and investigations by the show's human resources department, initially reported in November 2019. For the rest of the season, Garlin's character continued to appear on the show via outtakes, a stand-in, and CGI. The character was later killed off in the show's tenth and final season.

In July 2013, Garlin directed his second film, Dealin' with Idiots, inspired by his experiences with his sons in Little League. The entire film was improvised.

In October 2019, Garlin revealed that he would have a role in Star Wars: The Rise of Skywalker, the final installment of the Star Wars saga, which was released on December 20, 2019. Garlin played Junn Gobint.

==== Misconduct allegations ====
On December 3, 2021, Vanity Fair published an article detailing that Garlin had been under investigation for three years for "allegedly engag[ing] in a pattern of verbal and physical conduct on [the set of The Goldbergs] that made people uncomfortable". The report found that he had used "inappropriate language" and engaged in "unwanted physical contact" on set such as hugging or touching others without their consent. On December 15, it was announced that Garlin would not return to the show. His departure was said to be a mutual decision.

=== Writing ===
In 2010, Garlin published a book, My Footprint: Carrying the Weight of the World, a memoir that documents his journey to lessen his carbon footprint.

=== Podcast ===
On the comedy podcast network Earwolf, Garlin hosted By the Way, In Conversation with Jeff Garlin, which consisted of unscripted talks rather than formal interviews. The debut episode featured Garlin's Curb Your Enthusiasm co-star Larry David. The twice monthly installments were recorded in front of a live audience at Largo at the Coronet in Los Angeles. The podcast's last episode was released in February 2015.

=== Other works ===
In March 2018, Garlin was one of the actors who voiced the audiobook A Day in the Life of Marlon Bundo.

In August 2020, Garlin was a guest DJ on SiriusXM's Tom Petty Radio.

== Influences ==
Katie Puckrik in The Guardian wrote, "British comedy is a touchstone for Garlin". Garlin has said: "Monty Python changed my life. I watched the original Office. I love The Mighty Boosh and The Goon Show. I'm a fanatic about Ealing comedies. And Fawlty Towers is probably my favorite thing that I've ever seen come out of England."

== Personal life ==
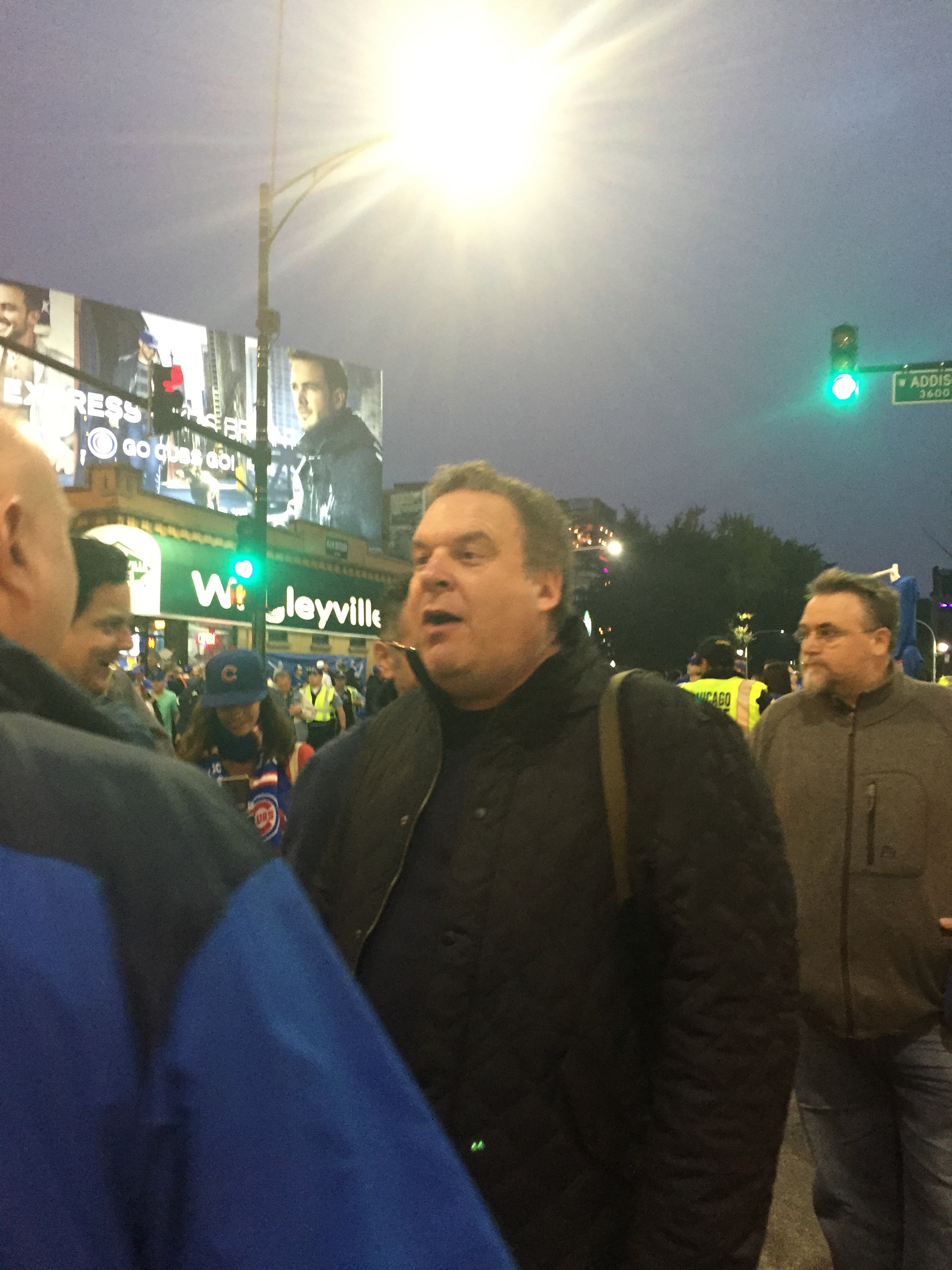
Garlin in Wrigleyville before Game Four of the 2016 World Series

Garlin married Marla Beth Cahan on July 24, 1994. They have two sons. In September 2018, they announced their intention to divorce. In March 2020, Garlin said that he and Cahan were at the end of their divorce proceedings. Garlin has been dating Sari Tracht, an editor, since early 2021.

Garlin is a fan of the Chicago Cubs. Every year on his birthday, Garlin attends a game with his friend Kevin Cronin, the lead singer of REO Speedwagon. Garlin is also a fan of the Chicago Bears and is a season-ticket holder.

Garlin wrote in his book that he voted for Barack Obama in the 2008 election.

Garlin practices transcendental meditation, which he does twice a day. Garlin says it has helped him with symptoms of ADHD.

For a few years, Garlin lived with talk-show host Conan O'Brien. O'Brien has said that sometimes Garlin woke him up in the middle of the night and made him perform skits.

Garlin's dog on the television show The Goldbergs lives with him in real life.

On September 20, 2022, Garlin announced that he has been struggling with bipolar disorder, writing: "Bipolar is a motherfucker. Sometimes it's just too much to deal with. I'm doing the best I can. This the first time that I've opened up about this."

=== Health ===
In his late 20s, Garlin had surgery in Oklahoma City, Oklahoma, to correct the heart condition Wolff–Parkinson–White syndrome, a defect in an accessory electrical conduction pathway in the heart that results in tachycardia.

In February 2000, before filming began on Curb Your Enthusiasm, Garlin had a stroke at age 37. During the early episodes of season one, he had noticeably slurred speech that later improved. In addition to epilepsy and attention deficit disorder, Garlin has type II diabetes, which he controls with diet and exercise. Garlin has written about his problems with food and discussed his weight problems publicly. In a 2011 interview, he said: "I think people look at fat people as having a lack of willpower when willpower has nothing to do with it. I didn't change my life until I approached everything like an addict. I haven't had sweets in almost three years because I know if I have one cookie, just like if an alcoholic has his first drink, I'm off to the races and I'm back eating sugar again."

== Filmography ==
=== Film ===
Year	Title	Role	Notes
1983	Spring Break	Gut Gut	Uncredited
1992	Straight Talk	Bob	
1992	Hero	News Vendor	
1993	RoboCop 3	Donut Jerk	
1994	Little Big League	Opposing Little League Manager	
1996	Gross Ratings	Jack Bekins	Short film
1998	Senseless	Arlo Vickers	
1999	Austin Powers: The Spy Who Shagged Me	Cyclops	
2000	Bounce	Emcee	
2000	Self Storage	Duncan Baumgartner	Short film
2002	Run Ronnie Run!	Birthday Woman's Friend	
2002	Naked Movie	Writer No. 1	
2002	The Third Wheel	Office Worker	Uncredited
2002	Full Frontal	Harvey	
2003	Daddy Day Care	Phillip "Phil" Ryerson	
2004	Sleepover	Mr. Corky	
2004	Outing Riley	Partner in Architects' Firm	Uncredited
2004	After the Sunset	Ron	
2004	Fat Albert	Jerry	Uncredited
2005	Fun with Dick and Jane	Boss	
2006	Hooked	Mr. Waterhouse	Short film
2006	The Jeff Garlin Program	Jeff	
2006	I Want Someone to Eat Cheese With	James Aaron	Also writer/director
2007	Trainwreck: My Life as an Idiot	Lenny	
2008	Strange Wilderness	Ed Lawson	
2008	The Rocker	Stan	
2008	WALL-E	Captain B. McCrea	Voice
2008	BURN-E	Captain B. McCrea	Voice, short film; archive footage from WALL-E
2010	The Bounty Hunter	Sid	
2010	Toy Story 3	Buttercup	Voice
2011	Toy Story Toons: Hawaiian Vacation	Buttercup	Voice
2011	Cars 2	Otis	Voice
2012	Adventures in the Sin Bin	Dean Theatard	
2012	Safety Not Guaranteed	Mr. Britt	
2012	ParaNorman	Perry Babcock	Voice
2013	Dealin' with Idiots	Max Morris	Also writer and director
2014	Laggies	Ed Burch	
2017	Lemon	Guy Roach	
2017	Handsome	Gene Handsome	Also writer and director
2017	Becoming Bond	Harry Saltzman	Documentary
2019	Toy Story 4	Buttercup	Voice
2019	Star Wars: The Rise of Skywalker	Junn Gobint	Cameo
2020	This Is the Year	Mr. Elmer	
2022	Studio 666	Jeremy Shill	
2022	Babylon	Don Wallach	

=== Television ===
Year	Title	Role	Notes
1989	Roseanne	Fred	Episode: "Lobocop"
1989	Dear John	Deliveryman	Episode: "Kate, a Date, & Fate"
1990	Open House	Brian	Episode: "An Unmarried Woman"
1994	Baywatch	Larry 'Loomin' Large	Episodes: "K-Gas the Groove Yard of Solid Gold"
1995	The Computer Wore Tennis Shoes	Agent Reese	Television film
1997	Dr. Katz, Professional Therapist	Jeff	Voice, episode: "Alibi"
1997	The Love Bug	Highway Patrolman	Television film
1997–1999	Mad About You	Marvin	14 episodes
1999	Larry David: Curb Your Enthusiasm	Jeff Greene	Television film
2000	The Michael Richards Show	Jeff Schaffer	Episode: "The Consultant"
2000–2024	Curb Your Enthusiasm	Jeff Greene	12 seasons; series regular
2001	Late Friday	Himself/host	Unspecified
2001	Three Sisters	Joel	Episode: "He Ain't Heavy, He's My Brother"
2001	Dead Last	Ron Belson	Episode: "The Problem with Corruption"
2001–2002	What About Joan?	Steinie	8 episodes
2001–2003	Everybody Loves Raymond	Produce Manager Jimmy	2 episodes
2002	King of the Hill	Dan	Voice, episode: "The Fat and the Furious"
2003	Greetings from Tucson	Executive (2003)	Episode: "My Friend Mom"
2003	Crank Yankers	Jeff	Voice, 3 episodes
2004	Tom Goes to the Mayor	Pat Croce	Voice, episode: "Rat's Off to Ya"
2005	Duck Dodgers	Camoman	Voice, episode: "Bonafide Heroes"
2005	Yes, Dear	Howie	Episode: "Marital Aid"
2005	MADtv	Hank Whitley	Episode: #11.08
2005–2006, 2013	Arrested Development	Mort Meyers	11 episodes
2006	Campus Ladies	Mr. Hubney	Episode: "A Very Special Episode"
2006	The Jimmy Timmy Power Hour 3: The Jerkinators!	The Villain Whose Name Isn't Shirley	Voice, television film
2007	Law & Order: Criminal Intent	Barry Freeburg	Episode: "Contract"
2008	Shorty McShorts' Shorts	Duke	Voice, episode: "Flip-Flopped"
2008	The Life & Times of Tim	Various characters	Voice, 2 episodes
2008–2010	Wizards of Waverly Place	Uncle Kelbo	3 episodes
2010	Entourage	Roger Jay	Episode: "Dramedy"
2011	Community	Himself	Episode: "Documentary Filmmaking: Redux"
2013	Maron	Jeff Garlin	Episode: "Mac's Dad"
2013–2022	The Goldbergs	Murray Goldberg	Main role
2014	2 Broke Girls	David	Episode: "And the Not Broke Parents"
2014	Family Guy	Himself	Voice, episode: "The 2000-Year-Old Virgin"
2017	SpongeBob SquarePants	Cuddle E. Hugs	Voice, episode: "Cuddle E. Hugs"
2019	Celebrity Family Feud	Himself	Episode: "Black-ish vs. The Goldbergs"
2020	Forky Asks a Question	Buttercup	Voice, short film: "What Is Cheese?"
2021	Celebrity Wheel of Fortune	Himself	Episode: "Donny Osmond, Jeff Garlin and Amber Riley"
2022	Kung Fu Sock	Giant Octopus	Voice, episode: "Hao's Disappearance"
2023	Never Have I Ever	Len	5 episodes
2026	Life, Larry and the Pursuit of Unhappiness	Benjamin Donner	Episode: "Lawrence"

=== Video games ===
Year	Title	Role
1997	Blade Runner	Lieutenant Edison Guzza
2008	WALL-E	Captain
2010	Toy Story 3: The Video Game	Buttercup

=== Music videos ===
Year	Title	Artist(s)	Role	Ref.
1997	"A Change Would Do You Good" (Version 2)	Sheryl Crow	Taxi Passenger	

== Awards and nominations ==
Year	Award	Category	Title	Result	Ref.
2001	Primetime Emmy Awards	Outstanding Comedy Series	Curb Your Enthusiasm	Nominated	
2002	Primetime Emmy Awards	Outstanding Comedy Series	Curb Your Enthusiasm	Nominated	
2003	Primetime Emmy Awards	Outstanding Comedy Series	Curb Your Enthusiasm	Nominated	
2005	Primetime Emmy Awards	Outstanding Comedy Series	Curb Your Enthusiasm	Nominated	
2007	Primetime Emmy Awards	Outstanding Comedy Series	Curb Your Enthusiasm	Nominated	
2009	Primetime Emmy Awards	Outstanding Comedy Series	Curb Your Enthusiasm	Nominated	
2011	Primetime Emmy Awards	Outstanding Comedy Series	Curb Your Enthusiasm	Nominated	
2017	Primetime Emmy Awards	Outstanding Comedy Series	Curb Your Enthusiasm	Nominated	
2020	Primetime Emmy Awards	Outstanding Comedy Series	Curb Your Enthusiasm	Nominated	
2006	Screen Actors Guild Awards	Outstanding Ensemble in a Comedy Series	Curb Your Enthusiasm	Nominated	
2009	Screen Actors Guild Awards	Outstanding Ensemble in a Comedy Series	Curb Your Enthusiasm	Nominated	
2017	Screen Actors Guild Awards	Outstanding Ensemble in a Comedy Series	Curb Your Enthusiasm	Nominated	
2002	Producers Guild Awards	Best Episodic Comedy	Curb Your Enthusiasm	Won	
2004	Producers Guild Awards	Best Episodic Comedy	Curb Your Enthusiasm	Won	
2006	Producers Guild Awards	Best Episodic Comedy	Curb Your Enthusiasm	Nominated	
2008	Producers Guild Awards	Best Episodic Comedy	Curb Your Enthusiasm	Nominated	
2010	Producers Guild Awards	Best Episodic Comedy	Curb Your Enthusiasm	Nominated	
2012	Producers Guild Awards	Best Episodic Comedy	Curb Your Enthusiasm	Nominated	
2017	Producers Guild Awards	Best Episodic Comedy	Curb Your Enthusiasm	Nominated	
2007	Berlin International Film Festival	Best Documentary	This Filthy World	Nominated	
2012	Gotham Awards	Best Ensemble Cast	Safety Not Guaranteed	Nominated	

== Works and publications ==
- Garlin, Jeff, and John Ficarra. The MAD Bathroom Companion: The Gushing Fourth Edition. New York: MAD Books, 2004.
- Garlin, Jeff. My Footprint: Carrying the Weight of the World. New York: Gallery Books, 2010; ISBN 978-1-439-15010-8
  - Republished as: Garlin, Jeff. Curbing It. New York: Gallery Books, 2010; ISBN 978-1-439-15012-2
