= Some Assembly Required (2007 TV series) =

Discovery Channel show

- Starring: Brian Unger; Lou Bloomfield (season 1)
- Country of origin: United States
- No. of seasons: 2
- No. of episodes: 15

Production
- Camera setup: Multi-camera
- Running time: 60 mins (season 1); 30 mins (season 2)

Original release
- Network: Discovery Channel; Discovery HD; Discovery On Demand
- Release: December 27, 2007 – August 28, 2008

Some Assembly Required is a Discovery Channel television series which premiered in the United States on December 27, 2007 and originally aired in 2007 and 2008. Hosts Brian Unger and physicist Lou Bloomfield explain how various things are manufactured and participate in the manufacturing process. The show is also titled as How Stuff's Made in the UK.

== Episodes ==
Season 1 (2007–2008)

Episode #	Item 1	Item 2	Item 3	Original Air Date
1	Magic Jump	Zamboni	Plate-glass windows that can withstand hurricane-force winds.	December 27, 2007
2	Les Paul electric guitar	Batesville Casket Company	Burt's Bees lip balm	January 8, 2008
3	Ebonite bowling ball factory	Jelly Bellies	Environmentally compliant toilet	January 15, 2008
4	Cheddar Cheese Factory	New Balance running shoes	Steinway piano	January 22, 2008
5	Perfect steel knife	John Deere lawnmowers	Country's oldest chocolate factory in San Francisco	January 29, 2008
6	High-tech golf clubs	Redesigned BMW diesel engine	Salt mines	February 5, 2008
7	Jack Daniels whiskey barrels	Cat's eye marbles	Double-hulled Boston Whaler motor boat.	February 12, 2008

Season 2 (2008)

Episode #	Item 1	Item 2	Original Air Date
1	Crash-test dummies	Old-fashioned kettle chips	August 7, 2008
2	Sutphen fire engines	Refined sugar	August 7, 2008
3	Leatherman Skeletool, Portland, Oregon	Simmons Beautyrest, Charlotte, North Carolina	August 14, 2008
4	BowTech compound bow	Ludwig drums	August 14, 2008
5	Washable crayons,	Pipe organs	August 21, 2008
6	Cast-iron cookware	Watercraft	August 21, 2008
7	The Tennessean newspaper, Nashville, Tennessee	Olhausen billiard table, Portland, Tennessee	August 28, 2008
8	Peterbilt Model 387 semi-trailer truck, Denton, Texas	Ithaca featherlight shotgun, Ithaca, New York	August 28, 2008
