= Zach Galifianakis =

American comedian and actor (born 1969)

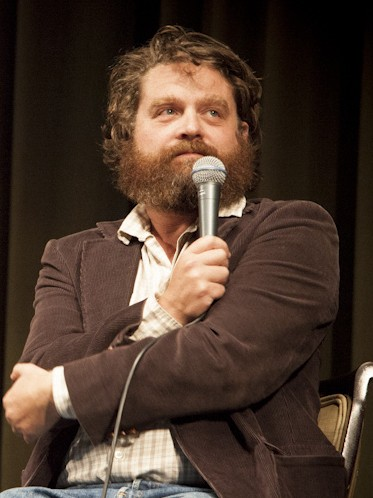
- Galifianakis in 2012
- Born: Zachary Knight Galifianakis; October 1, 1969 (age 57); North Wilkesboro, North Carolina, U.S.
- Education: Wilkes Community College; North Carolina State University
- Occupations: Comedian; actor; writer
- Years active: 1996–present
- Spouse: Quinn Lundberg (m. 2012)
- Children: 2
- Relatives: Nick Galifianakis (uncle); Nick Galifianakis (cousin)

Zachary Knight Galifianakis (/ˌɡælɪfəˈnækɪs/; born October 1, 1969) is an American comedian, actor and writer. From 2009 to 2013, Galifianakis played Alan in The Hangover trilogy. On television, he starred in the FX series Baskets (2016–2019), for which he was nominated for the Primetime Emmy Award for Outstanding Lead Actor in a Comedy Series in 2017. He also hosted the Funny or Die talk show Between Two Ferns with Zach Galifianakis (2008–2018) and starred in the HBO series Bored to Death (2009–2011).

Galifianakis's other film credits include Due Date (2010), It's Kind of a Funny Story (2010), The Campaign (2012), Birdman or (The Unexpected Virtue of Ignorance) (2014), Between Two Ferns: The Movie (2019), and Lilo & Stitch (2025). He has also voiced characters in animated films such as Puss in Boots (2011), The Lego Batman Movie (2017), Missing Link (2019), Ron's Gone Wrong (2021), The Bob's Burgers Movie (2022), and Thelma the Unicorn (2024).

== Early life ==
Zachary Knight Galifianakis was born on October 1, 1969, in North Wilkesboro, North Carolina, to community arts center director Mary Frances (née Cashion) and heating oil vendor Harry Galifianakis. His mother is of Scots-Irish descent, while his paternal grandparents were Greek immigrants from Crete. He was baptized in his father's Greek Orthodox faith.

He has a younger sister, Merritt, and an older brother, Greg. Their cousin is Washington Post cartoonist Nick Galifianakis, while their late uncle, also named Nick Galifianakis, was a Durham attorney and politician who served in the U.S. House of Representatives from 1967 to 1973.

He attended Wilkes Central High School, Wilkes Community College and subsequently attended North Carolina State University, where he majored in communications. While in college, Galifianakis worked at a public access station. He taught a waltz class in 1991, where he crossed paths with Mary J. Blige.

== Career ==
=== Early work ===
Galifianakis moved to New York City with college friend and future Late Night with Jimmy Fallon head writer A.D. Miles. Following his television debut on Boston Common, Galifianakis joined Saturday Night Live for two weeks. He has stated "I worked on Saturday Night Live for two weeks, and Britney Spears was the host one week when I was doing it. Wrote a sketch, Will Ferrell was going to play a bodyguard to her belly-button, and we were going to shrink Will down to fit into a belly-button. ...she just stared at me after I explained it to her. And then, she finally goes 'Yeah, that's funny.'" Galifianakis co-starred in the film Out Cold, and had small roles in Corky Romano, Below, Bubble Boy, Heartbreakers, Into the Wild, Super High Me, Little Fish Strange Pond and Largo.

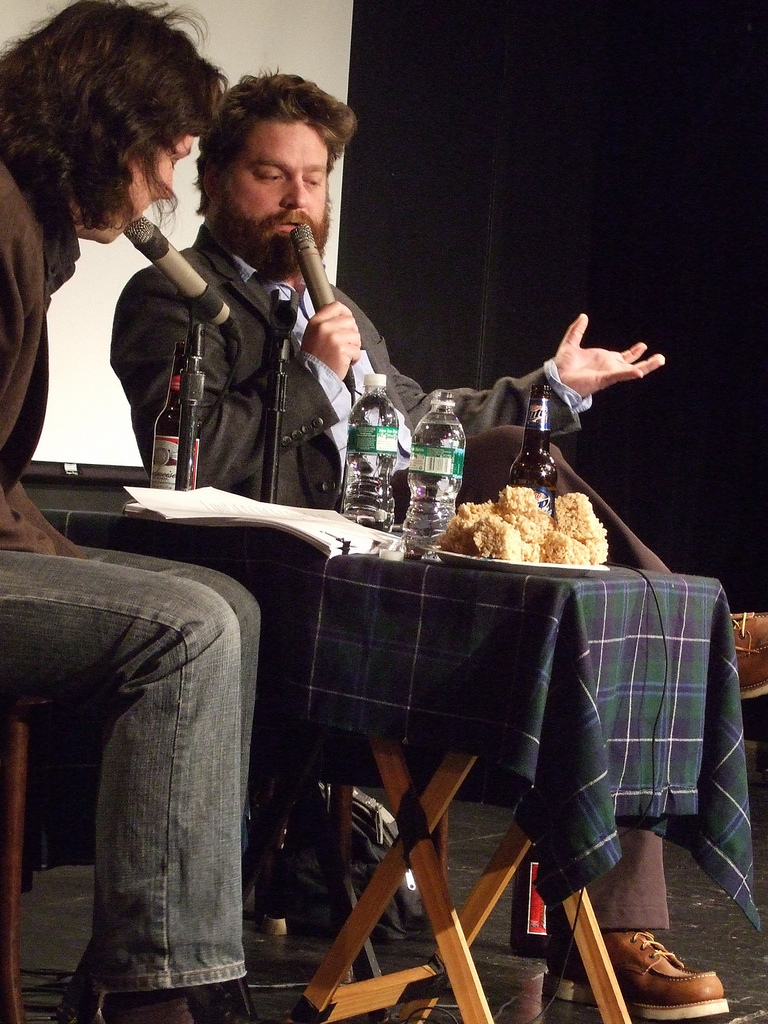
Galifianakis on Inside Joke in New York City in 2008.

In September 2001, he appeared in an episode of Comedy Central Presents. It included a stand-up routine, a segment with a piano, and a cappella group The Night Owls (introduced as his "12 ex-girlfriends") singing "Eternal Flame" by The Bangles while he made jokes. In 2002, he hosted his own VH1 talk show called Late World with Zach. It featured many of his friends and regular performers from the Los Angeles comedy and music venue Largo where he appeared frequently during this time period. He played Davis in the Fox drama series Tru Calling. He appeared many times on Jimmy Kimmel Live! and played Frisbee in Reno 911!

Galifianakis played Alan Finger on the Comedy Central show Dog Bites Man, a fake news program that caught people during candid moments thinking they were being interviewed by a real news crew. He also guest-starred in the episode of the Comedy Central show The Sarah Silverman Program as Fred the Homeless Guy. He also had a recurring guest role as a doctor on the animated Adult Swim show Tom Goes to the Mayor and appeared in several episodes of Tim and Eric Awesome Show, Great Job! in a recurring role as Tairy Greene.

In 2006, Galifianakis appeared in Fiona Apple's music video for the song "Not About Love", where he is seen lip-synching the lyrics to the song. A year later, Kanye West employed Galifianakis and indie rock musician Will Oldham for similar purposes in the second version of the video for his song "Can't Tell Me Nothing". In June 2006, Galifianakis released the single "Come On and Get It (Up in 'Dem Guts)", a comedic hip-hop dance song which features Apple's vocals.

Galifianakis, Patton Oswalt, Brian Posehn and Maria Bamford, are the four Comedians of Comedy, a periodic packaged comedy tour in the style of The Original Kings of Comedy and the Blue Collar Comedy Tour. They chose to perform at live rock clubs as opposed to comedy clubs to try to reach a different audience. Much of the tour was taped and has been featured in both a short-lived TV series on Comedy Central and a full-length film that has appeared at SXSW and on Showtime. On February 22, 2008, he made an appearance on the Jackassworld.com: 24 Hour Takeover. He interviewed various members of the Jackass cast. Galifianakis starred in first leading role in the independent film Visioneers which premiered in 2008. The film was released on direct-to-DVD. That same year, Galifianakis appeared in a web video series of advertisements for Absolut vodka, along with Tim Heidecker and Eric Wareheim, creating a parody of the Golden Girls in which one has a deep anger issue, breaking the fourth wall in exasperation and outright violence on the set. He also completed the pilot Speed Freaks for Comedy Central.

His 2006 stand-up concert film Zach Galifianakis Live at the Purple Onion was one of the first original programs from Netflix.

=== Between Two Ferns with Zach Galifianakis ===
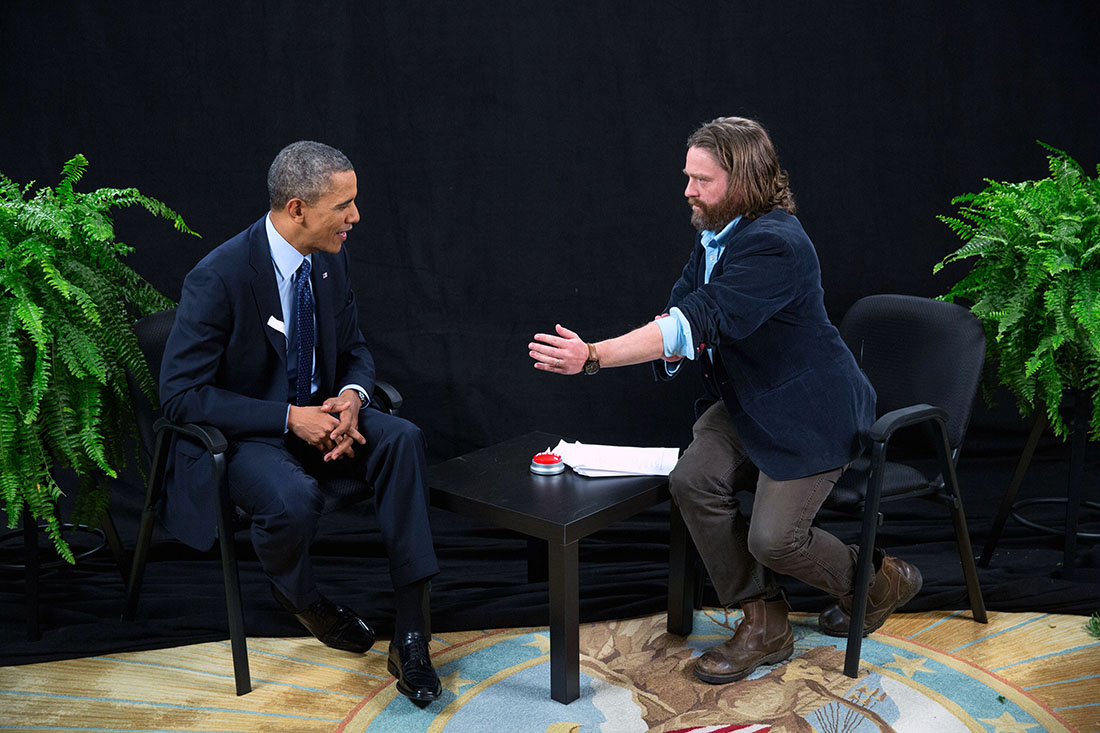
Zach Galifianakis interviewing Barack Obama for Between Two Ferns.

Galifianakis has a series of videos on the Funny or Die website titled Between Two Ferns With Zach Galifianakis where he conducts interviews with popular celebrities between two potted ferns. He has interviewed Jimmy Kimmel, Michael Cera, Jon Hamm, Natalie Portman, Charlize Theron, Bradley Cooper, Carrot Top, Conan O'Brien, Andy Richter, Andy Dick, Ben Stiller, Steve Carell, Sean Penn, Bruce Willis, Tila Tequila, Jennifer Aniston, Will Ferrell, Samuel L. Jackson, Tobey Maguire, Arcade Fire, Justin Bieber, Brie Larson, David Letterman, former President Barack Obama, Hillary Clinton, Brad Pitt, and Keanu Reeves. His interview style consists of typical interview questions, bizarre non sequiturs, awkward product endorsements, and sometimes inappropriate sexual questions and comments. Galifianakis won the Primetime Emmy Award for Outstanding Short-Format Live-Action Entertainment Program as a producer of the show at the 66th Primetime Creative Arts Emmy Awards.

=== Mainstream performances ===
Galifianakis played Alan Garner in the hit comedy The Hangover and earned the MTV Movie Award for the Best Comedic Performance. He was also prominently advertised in subsequent films that featured him in supporting roles, such as G-Force, Youth in Revolt, and Up in the Air.

Galifianakis starred in the HBO series Bored to Death and hosted Saturday Night Live on March 6, 2010 during the show's 35th season, during which he shaved his beard mid-show for a sketch, and closed the show wearing a fake one. He hosted again on March 12, 2011, and shaved his head this time, in a Mr. T-like hairstyle, which was allegedly supposed to be used for a sketch that never aired due to time constraints.

In 2010, he starred in several films, including Dinner for Schmucks, It's Kind of a Funny Story, and Due Date. In October 2010, during a discussion of California's Proposition 19 on HBO's Real Time with Bill Maher, Galifianakis lit and puffed what looked like a marijuana cigarette; days later, Maher said on CNN that it was not cannabis but “cloves or something.” In 2011, he reprised his role for The Hangover Part II, which was set in Thailand, and voiced Humpty Dumpty in Puss in Boots. Galifianakis starred alongside Will Ferrell in Jay Roach's 2012 political comedy The Campaign. He received critical praise for his performance in the 2014 film Birdman or (The Unexpected Virtue of Ignorance), in which he starred with Michael Keaton, Emma Stone, and Edward Norton. In 2017, Galifianakis voiced the Joker in The Lego Batman Movie. In February 2023, Galifianakis joined the live-action film adaptation of Lilo & Stitch as Dr. Jumba Jookiba.

=== Comedic style and persona ===
Commentators have described Galifianakis's stage and screen persona as deliberately awkward, deadpan, and confrontational, aligning him with alternative comedy traditions. A 2016 review connected his Between Two Ferns interviews to “uproariously uncomfortable” anti-talk-show satire, while a 2018 profile emphasized how he negotiated mainstream fame without abandoning the off-kilter sensibility of his stand-up and sketch work. The tone of his FX series Baskets was likewise noted for its bleak humor and working-class focus.

== Charity work ==
In January 2014, Galifianakis and his Night of a Thousand Vaginas co-star Sarah Silverman announced their intention to raise $20,000 to help fund the Texas Abortion Fund, part of a nationwide network of funds set up to assist women in obtaining abortions in states whose legislatures had placed restrictions on the practice. The fundraiser was set up in response to the passage of Texas H.B. 2, which established several restrictions that forced a majority of the state's abortion clinics to close.

Galifianakis befriended Marie "Mimi" Haist, a homeless woman in her 80s who was living in a Santa Monica laundromat for 18 years, found her an apartment across the street from the laundromat, and quietly paid the rent. The story was revealed in the 2015 documentary Queen Mimi.

== Personal life ==
In August 2012, Zach Galifianakis married Canadian charity worker Quinn Lundberg at the UBC Farm in Vancouver. They have two sons together: one born on September 7, 2013 (Galifianakis skipped the premiere of his film Are You Here for the birth) and another born on November 7, 2016.

Galifianakis has a house in Venice, Los Angeles, and previously lived in Brooklyn. Galifianakis also owns a farm in Sparta, North Carolina and splits his time between the farm and his work: "My farm is a place that I get to think clearly and pretend to know what I am doing."

For almost ten years, Galifianakis and his family have lived on-and-off in a small town in British Columbia.

== Filmography ==
Key
| † | Denotes films that have not yet been released |

=== Film ===
| Year | Title | Role | Notes |
|---|---|---|---|
| 1999 | Flushed | Pathetic Guy | |
| 2001 | Heartbreakers | Bill | |
| 2001 | Bubble Boy | Bus Stop Man | |
| 2001 | Corky Romano | Dexter | |
| 2001 | Out Cold | Luke | |
| 2002 | Below | Weird Wally | |
| 2002 | Stella shorts | Santa | Short films |
| 2005 | The Comedians of Comedy | Himself | Stand-up tour documentary |
| 2005 | Zach Galifianakis: Look Who It Isn't | Himself | Self-released stand-up DVD |
| 2006 | Zach Galifianakis Live at the Purple Onion | Himself | Stand-up special |
| 2007 | The Comedians of Comedy: Live at The Troubadour | Himself | Stand-up tour concert video |
| 2007 | Into the Wild | Kevin Wallis | |
| 2008 | What Happens in Vegas | Dave the Bear | |
| 2008 | Visioneers | George | |
| 2009 | The Ballad of G.I. Joe | Snow Job | Short film |
| 2009 | Gigantic | Homeless Guy | |
| 2009 | The Hangover | Alan Garner | also sung "Three Best Friends" as part of the film's soundtrack |
| 2009 | G-Force | Ben Kendell | |
| 2009 | Up in the Air | Steve Sewa | |
| 2009 | Operation: Endgame | Hermit | |
| 2009 | Little Fish, Strange Pond | Bucky | |
| 2009 | Youth in Revolt | Jerry | |
| 2010 | Dinner for Schmucks | Therman Murch | |
| 2010 | It's Kind of a Funny Story | Bobby | |
| 2010 | Due Date | Ethan Tremblay/Ethan Chase/Stu | |
| 2011 | The Hangover Part II | Alan Garner | |
| 2011 | Puss in Boots | Humpty Dumpty (voice) | |
| 2011 | The Muppets | Hobo Joe | |
| 2012 | Tim and Eric's Billion Dollar Movie | Jim Joe Kelly | |
| 2012 | The Campaign | Marty Huggins | Also producer |
| 2013 | The Hangover Part III | Alan Garner | |
| 2014 | Are You Here | Ben Baker | |
| 2014 | Muppets Most Wanted | Hobo Joe | Cameo |
| 2014 | Birdman or (The Unexpected Virtue of Ignorance) | Jake | |
| 2016 | Masterminds | David Ghantt | |
| 2016 | Keeping Up with the Joneses | Jeff Gaffney | |
| 2017 | The Lego Batman Movie | The Joker (voice) | |
| 2017 | Batman is Just Not That Into You | The Joker (voice) | Short film |
| 2017 | Tulip Fever | Gerrit | |
| 2018 | A Wrinkle in Time | The Happy Medium | |
| 2019 | The Sunlit Night | Haldor | |
| 2019 | Missing Link | Mr. Susan Link (voice) | |
| 2019 | Between Two Ferns: The Movie | Himself | Also writer and producer |
| 2021 | Ron's Gone Wrong | Ron (voice) | |
| 2022 | The Bob's Burgers Movie | Felix Fischoeder (voice) | |
| 2023 | The Beanie Bubble | Ty Warner | |
| 2024 | Winner | Ron Winner | |
| 2024 | Thelma the Unicorn | Crusty Trucker (voice) | |
| 2025 | Lilo & Stitch | Dr. Jumba Jookiba / "Marcus" | |
| 2026 | The Gallerist | Dalton Hardberry | |

=== Television ===
| Year | Title | Role | Notes |
|---|---|---|---|
| 1996–1997 | Boston Common | Bobby | 5 episodes |
| 1997 | Apartment 2F | Zach | 5 episodes |
| 2002 | Late World with Zach | Himself (host) | 36 episodes |
| 2002 | Next! | Various characters | Pilot, also writer |
| 2003–2005 | Tru Calling | Davis | 27 episodes |
| 2005–2007 | Reno 911! | Frisbee | 4 episodes |
| 2006 | Dog Bites Man | Alan Finger | 9 episodes; also writer and producer |
| 2006 | Tom Goes to the Mayor | Dr. Vickerson | Voice, 2 episodes |
| 2006 | Wonder Showzen | Uncle Daddy | Voice, episode: "Horse Apples" |
| 2007 | The Sarah Silverman Program | Fred Blorth | Episode: "Humanitarian of the Year" |
| 2007–2010 | Tim and Eric Awesome Show, Great Job! | Tairy Greene / Various characters | 7 episodes |
| 2008–2018 | Between Two Ferns with Zach Galifianakis | Himself (host) | 22 episodes |
| 2008 | Jackassworld.com: 24 Hour Takeover | Himself (uncredited) | Television special; "Hour 12, 13 & 14" |
| 2009–2010 | American Dad! | Heavyset Man, Norman, Juror | Voice, 2 episodes |
| 2009–2011 | Bored to Death | Ray Hueston | 24 episodes |
| 2010 | Funny or Die Presents | Cast (Just 3 Boyz) | Episode #1.10 |
| 2010–2013 | Saturday Night Live | Himself (host) | 3 episodes |
| 2012–present | Bob's Burgers | Chet, Felix | Voice, 15 episodes |
| 2012–2016 | Comedy Bang! Bang! | Himself / Santa Claus | 5 episodes |
| 2013 | Kroll Show | Various characters | Episode: "The Greatest Hits of It" |
| 2013 | The Chris Gethard Show | Himself | Episode: "Who Wants a Haircut" |
| 2013–2014 | Tim and Eric's Bedtime Stories | Zach | 2 episodes |
| 2013–2014 | Brody Stevens: Enjoy It! | Himself | 12 episodes |
| 2013 | Arcade Fire in Here Comes The Night Time | Captain Zach | Television special |
| 2014 | The Simpsons | Lucas Bortner | Voice, episode: "Luca$" |
| 2014 | TripTank | Jack the Janitor | Voice, episode: "Crossing the Line" |
| 2016–2019 | Baskets | Chip Baskets / Dale Baskets | 40 episodes; also co-creator, writer and executive producer |
| 2016 | Bajillion Dollar Propertie$ | The Bloodhound | Episode: "Victoria Awakens" |
| 2020 | Dicktown | Charlie | Voice, episode: "The Mystery of the Controversial Cosplay" |
| 2020–2021 | Big Mouth | Gratitoad | Voice, 3 episodes |
| 2024 | Only Murders in the Building | Himself | 7 episodes |
| 2026 | The Audacity | Carl Bardolph | 3 episodes |
| 2026 | This Is a Gardening Show | Himself | 6 episodes |

=== Video games ===
| Year | Title | Role | Notes |
|---|---|---|---|
| 2009 | G-Force | Ben | |

=== Music videos ===
| Year | Title | Role | Artist |
|---|---|---|---|
| 2007 | "Not About Love" | Himself | Fiona Apple |
| 2007 | "Can't Tell Me Nothing" | Himself | Kanye West |
| 2012 | "Outta My System" | Wizard | My Morning Jacket |
| 2013 | "Spring Break Anthem" | Himself | The Lonely Island |
| 2014 | "You In Your Were" | Himself | Kevin Drew |

== Awards and nominations ==
| Award | Year | Category | Recipient(s) | Result | Ref. |
|---|---|---|---|---|---|
| Annie Awards | 2012 | Best Voice Acting in a Feature Production | Puss in Boots | Nominated | |
| Annie Awards | 2018 | Best Voice Acting in a Feature Production | The Lego Batman Movie | Nominated | |
| Critics' Choice Movie Awards | 2015 | Best Acting Ensemble | Birdman | Won | |
| MTV Movie & TV Awards | 2010 | Best Breakout Star | The Hangover | Nominated | |
| MTV Movie & TV Awards | 2010 | Best Comedic Performance | The Hangover | Won | |
| MTV Movie & TV Awards | 2011 | Best Comedic Performance | Due Date | Nominated | |
| MTV Movie & TV Awards | 2012 | Best Comedic Performance | The Hangover Part II | Nominated | |
| MTV Movie & TV Awards | 2013 | Best On-Screen Duo (shared with Will Ferrell) | The Campaign | Nominated | |
| Nickelodeon Kids' Choice Awards | 2026 | Favorite Movie Actor | Lilo & Stitch | Nominated | |
| Nickelodeon Kids' Choice Awards | 2026 | Favorite Villain | Lilo & Stitch | Nominated | |
| Primetime Emmy Awards | 2011 | Outstanding Guest Actor in a Comedy Series | Saturday Night Live | Nominated | |
| Primetime Emmy Awards | 2013 | Outstanding Short-Format Live-Action Entertainment Program | Between Two Ferns with Zach Galifianakis | Nominated | |
| Primetime Emmy Awards | 2014 | Outstanding Short-Format Live-Action Entertainment Program | Between Two Ferns with Zach Galifianakis | Won | |
| Primetime Emmy Awards | 2015 | Outstanding Short-Format Live-Action Entertainment Program | Between Two Ferns with Zach Galifianakis | Won | |
| Primetime Emmy Awards | 2017 | Outstanding Lead Actor in a Comedy Series | Baskets | Nominated | |
| Primetime Emmy Awards | 2020 | Outstanding Short Form Variety Series | Between Two Ferns with Zach Galifianakis: The Movie, Sorta Uncut Interviews | Nominated | |
| Satellite Awards | 2018 | Best Actor – Television Series Musical or Comedy | Baskets | Nominated | |
| Screen Actors Guild Awards | 2015 | Outstanding Performance by a Cast in a Motion Picture | Birdman | Won | |
| Screen Actors Guild Awards | 2025 | Outstanding Performance by an Ensemble in a Comedy Series | Only Murders in the Building | Won | |
| Streamy Awards | 2010 | Best Male Actor in a Comedy Web Series | Between Two Ferns with Zach Galifianakis | Won | |
| Streamy Awards | 2014 | Best Collaboration (shared with Barack Obama) | Between Two Ferns with Zach Galifianakis | Won | |
