= Abortion Access Front =

Non-profit organisation

Abortion Access Front (formerly Lady Parts Justice League) is a reproductive rights non-profit organization and production company founded by Lizz Winstead in 2015.

== Background ==
Abortion Access Front founder Lizz Winstead, co-creator and former head writer of The Daily Show, sought to leverage her experience in comedy and broadcasting in order to help destigmatize abortion, while calling out politicians and rallying voters to oppose legal restrictions on abortion rights.

Abortion Access Front educates people about abortion laws through video content, programs (such as Operation Save Abortion and #ExposeFakeClinics), and its weekly podcast "Feminist Buzzkills Live." The organization also works on the ground, growing support and raising awareness for independent abortion providers, and was described as "a nonprofit that uses unexpected tools—like humor and men—to advocate for abortion as health care and as a fundamental human right."

They describe their work as "part Habitat For Humanity, part USO Tour for Independent abortion providers."

The organization's name was changed from Lady Parts Justice League to Abortion Access Front on May 30, 2019, in order to be more inclusive to transgender people served by the organization.

== Documentary ==
No One Asked You is a feature documentary in post-production by filmmaker Ruth Leitman following Lizz Winstead and the Abortion Access Front team. The film follows reproductive rights organization Abortion Access Front over five years at the frontlines of the escalating war over Roe v. Wade. The film premiered at the 2023 DOC NYC film festival, where it was a runner up for the Audience Award.
