= Lionel (radio personality) =

American radio personality

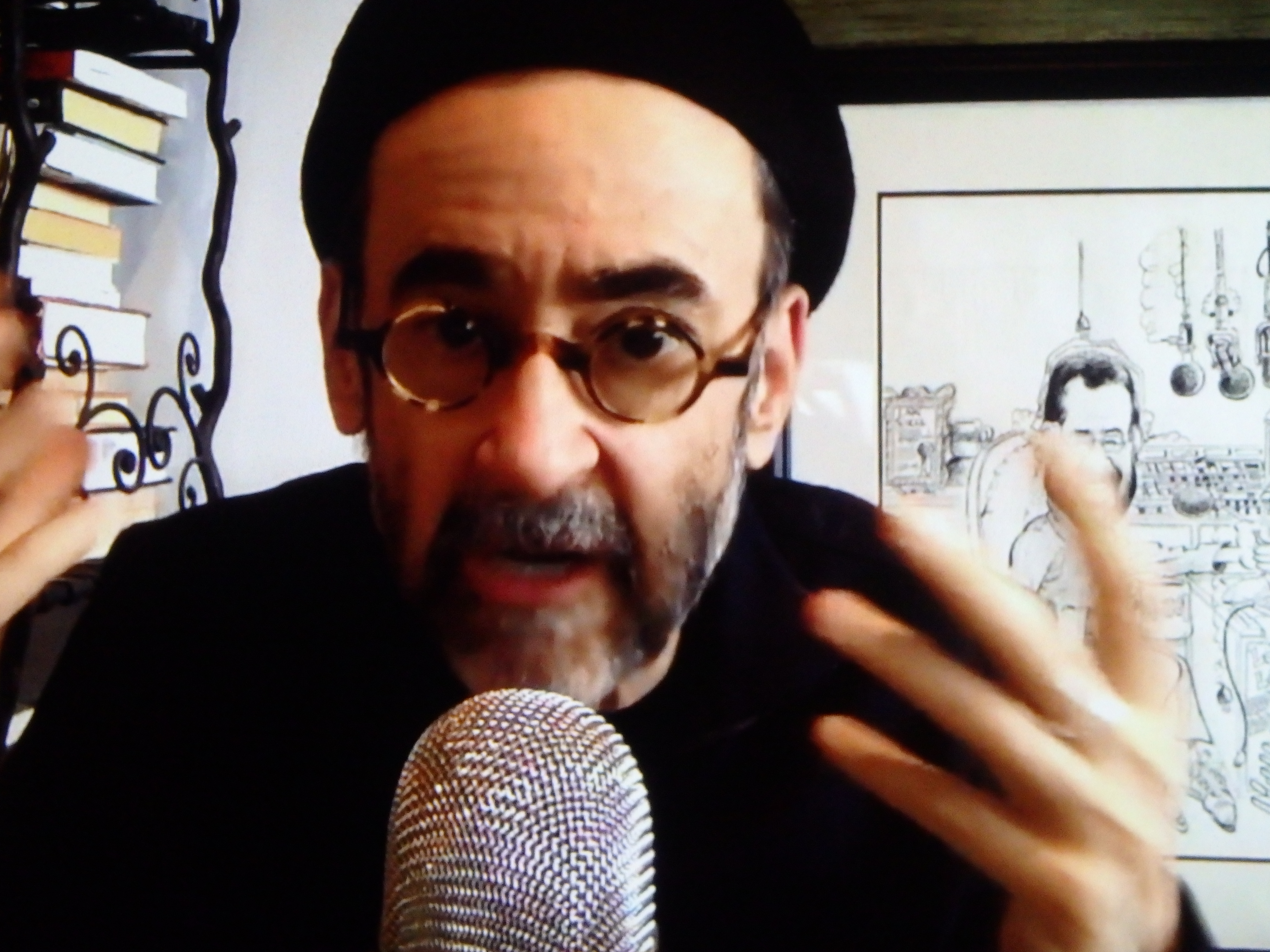
- Lionel in 2018
- Born: Michael William Lebron; August 26, 1958 (age 67); Tampa, Florida, U.S.
- Education: University of South Florida (BA); Stetson University (JD)
- Occupations: YouTube political and social commentary
- Spouse: Lynn Shaw
- Awards: 2015 New York Emmy Award for Writer: Commentary/Editorial
- Website: lionelmedia.com

Michael William Lebron (born August 26, 1958), better known as Lionel, is an American syndicated radio, television and YouTube legal and media analyst. He currently hosts the syndicated late-night radio show The Other Side of Midnight from WABC.

== Early life and education ==
Lebron was born and raised in Tampa, Florida, where he attended Jesuit High School. Lebron graduated from the University of South Florida and Stetson University College of Law. After graduating from law school, Lebron worked with the Hillsborough County State Attorney's Office.

== Career ==
Lebron hosted the CourtTV law show Snap Judgment in the late 1990s. He then began appearing on WABC radio in New York. He first appeared as a caller to WFLA in Tampa, Florida, drawing attention to himself by avoiding the given topic of discussion. He was eventually given his own time slot on WFLA before moving to New York City.

Beginning in May 2007, Lebron replaced The Majority Report with Sam Seder on Air America Radio with a daily three-hour talk show. Seder claimed that Lebron's unpopularity with Air America's listeners led to the loss of most of Seder's audience within a year of assuming the timeslot, as well as the loss of two-thirds of the live affiliates and live streaming.

Talkers Magazine included Lebron in its 2010 "Heaviest Hundred" list at number 54 and in its 2013 "Frontier Fifty" list at number 37. In 2015, he won a New York Emmy Award for commentary and editorial writing.

Lebron also appeared in an episode of House of Cards.

Since his show on Air America ended, Lebron's politics have gravitated to the right, having become one of the leading promoters of the QAnon conspiracy theory, and becoming a pundit for Alex Jones' Infowars network. He also runs a YouTube channel, Lionel Nation. He has appeared on the Russian RT network as a legal and political analyst.

In April 2025, Lionel returned to WABC, hosting the Saturday overnight show The Lionel Show. In June 2025, Lionel was named the new host of its syndicated weeknight overnight show, The Other Side of Midnight, succeeding Frank Morano (who left the show after being elected to New York City Council). In April 2026, Lionel was replaced as host by Walter Sterling and transitioned to hosting Another Side of Midnight, the syndicated weekend overnight show on WABC.
