= Brian Unger =

American television personality (born 1965)

- Born: Brian Douglas Unger; 1965 (age 60–61); Dayton, Ohio, United States
- Occupations: Actor, comedian, writer, producer, reporter and commentator
- Years active: 1996–present

Brian Douglas Unger (born 1965) is an American actor, comedian, writer, producer, and commentator.

== Early life and education ==
Born in Dayton, Ohio to Richard "Rich" Unger and Eleanor "Ellie" Oprea, Unger grew up in Granville, Ohio. He graduated from Granville High School and then from Ohio University in 1987, where he majored in communications. He worked on a television show titled Fridays Live, a student-produced comedy show airing on WOUB-TV, the local PBS affiliate. Unger returned to make a cameo on the show's Season 17 finale.

== Career ==
Unger was an original correspondent and producer on The Daily Show, from 1996 to 1998. While working for The Daily Show in 1998, he was named one of Entertainment Weekly's 100 Most Creative People in Entertainment. Unger's other television appearances include O2Be, Reno 911!, The Man Show, various I Love the... shows on VH1, It's Always Sunny in Philadelphia, Hollywood Off-Ramp, as well as appearances on The Jay Leno Show, Jimmy Kimmel Live!, Later, Talk Soup, Extra, and Zach Galifianakis Live at the Purple Onion.

He provided regular commentary ("The Unger Report") for the NPR show Day to Day from its launch in 2003 until its cancellation, making his final "Unger Report" on March 16, 2009. From 2009 to 2012 he provided commentary to NPR's All Things Considered.

He has hosted on MSNBC's Countdown with Keith Olbermann and Discovery Channel show Some Assembly Required (with University of Virginia Professor of Physics Lou Bloomfield; and then solo in its final season). Unger was one of the co-hosts for the pilot of the PBS series Wired Science.

Unger has appeared as a spokesman for Yoo-hoo and Maxwell House Coffee. In 2008, he appeared in a BMW documentary about testing of BMW diesels as they embark on a 500-mile road trip from South Carolina to Virginia. The film's purpose was to raise awareness of driving diesels in the United States. Unger later became the official spokesman for the BMW Advanced Diesel. He also appears in a number of recent Quicken Loans commercials.

Unger's written commentary has appeared in The New York Times and The Minneapolis Star Tribune, and he has written a book review for The Washington Post. He is a commentator on the internet talk show The Young Turks. The show was briefly broadcast on the Current TV television network from 2011 to 2013.

Unger was the narrator for the PBS American version of Nature's Spy in the Wild.

In 2019, he appeared alongside Kevin Costner in the TV series Yellowstone.

=== Hosting ===
Unger hosted a documentary special on The History Channel titled How the States Got Their Shapes. In 2011, the network expanded the special into a weekly series, which Unger hosts. As of 2014, Unger co-hosts Showdown of the Unbeatables.

As of September 8, 2013, Brian Unger hosted an NFL.com segment titled "Game Day Satisfaction: Week 1".

=== Traditional reporting ===
Unger joined the inaugural news staff of Atlanta television station WUPA (channel 69) as a multimedia journalist for the network-owned station that became the market's CBS affiliate in August of the same year; his on-air debut was September 15.

== Personal life ==
On The Young Turks online show "Old School" (July 10, 2023, with co-hosts Cenk Uygur and Ben Mankiewicz), Unger disclosed publicly for the first time that he is gay, and married to former child actor Nicholas Phillips. As of 2023, they live on a farm in Cherokee County, Georgia outside Atlanta.
