= Broke* =

- Directed by: Will Gray
- Written by: Will Gray
- Produced by: Will Gray
- Starring: Will Gray
- Narrated by: Will Gray
- Cinematography: Jonathan Kofahl
- Edited by: Stacey Schroeder
- Music by: Will Gray; Ben Kesler
- Release date: April 15, 2011 (Nashville)
- Country: United States

Broke* is a feature-length documentary film written and directed by Will Gray. The film is an autobiographical account of Gray's attempt to break into the music business. Broke* features appearances by Kelly Clarkson, Seth Godin, John Legend, Buddy Miller, Isaac Slade of The Fray, and Don Was.

== Synopsis ==
Broke* begins two years in the past, at the beginnings of Gray’s independent journey, recording demos in the basement of his friend's home. The demos come to the attention of producer T Bone Burnett who asks to meet and listen to more of Gray’s music.

Despite these auspicious beginnings, frustrating meetings with a New York record executive fail to produce an acceptable deal, so Gray decides to set out on his own as an independent artist. The film follows his struggles to establish a fanbase, manage bookings and cancellations, and all of the other exhilarations and frustrations of independent music making. Broke* features interviews with recording industry insiders about new paradigms for the music business.

== Cast ==
- Will Gray, himself

Remainder of cast listed in alphabetical order

- Lee Bailey, owner, EURweb
- Bobby Bare Jr. of the record label 30 Tigers
- Lonny Bereal, HitClub Entertainment
- The Candles
- Chopmaster J
- Kelly Clarkson
- Trent Dabbs
- Will Dailey
- Jim “Rocky” Del Balzo, Jim Del Balzo Management
- Bob Donnelly, Attorney
- The Fieros
- Seth Godin
- Mike Grimes, co-owner of The Basement
- Ali Harnell, Sr. Vice President of AEG Live
- Damien Horne
- Hymns, Independent Artist
- Joonie, HitClub Entertainment
- Steven Ivory, music journalist
- Nathan Johnson
- Nathan Lee, independent artist
- John Legend, Columbia Records
- Nicholas “Aqua” McCarrell
- Ian McEvily, Manager, Rebel One Management
- Buddy Miller of New West Records
- Catherine Moore, Director of the Music Business Graduate Program at Steinhardt School of Culture, Education, and Human Development
- Danara (Schurch) Moore, Columbia Records
- Emily Hope Price, Independent Artist
- Ian Quay, A&R and Label Manager, StarTime International
- Justin Roddick, owner, 12th & Porter (a Nashville night club)
- Audrey Ryan of Folkwit Records
- Isaac Slade, Epic Records
- Andy Smith of the band Paper Route
- Beka Tischker, Manager, Advanced Alternative Media
- Don Was

== Reception ==
Newsday called Broke* "a pretty accurate, sometimes wrenching, portrayal of what up-and-coming artists go through to advance their career." It was selected for presentation at the PhilFM (Philadelphia Film and Music) Festival, and at the Nashville Film Festival, where it was awarded the "Special Jury Prize for Most Original Vision" in the Gibson Music Films/Music City Competition.
