= The Comedians of Comedy =

Stand-up comedy tour, film, and television series

The Comedians of Comedy is a stand-up comedy tour featuring comedians Patton Oswalt, Zach Galifianakis, Brian Posehn and Maria Bamford that was documented in a 2005 film and 2005 Comedy Central television series of the same name, both directed by Michael Blieden. After Zach Galifianakis left the tour, he was replaced by comedian Eugene Mirman.

== History ==
The idea behind The Comedians of Comedy—its name a play on The Original Kings of Comedy and similar tours—involves the comedians performing at smaller indie rock venues instead of comedy clubs. Playing indie rock clubs was an idea taken from anti-comic Neil Hamburger, who is considered a pioneer of this type of show, playing such clubs since 2000. Both the film and television series alternate between footage of the comedians on stage and other aspects of their lives on the road.

The final Comedians of Comedy show with Patton Oswalt, Brian Posehn, and Maria Bamford occurred on July 28, 2008, in San Diego, California. Zach Galifianakis appeared via pre-recorded video/sketch and special guests included Paul Scheer, Rob Huebel, and Aziz Ansari of Human Giant, along with Sarah Silverman. The show took place at Spreckels Theatre in San Diego during the same weekend as the 2008 San Diego Comic-Con.

== Movies and series ==
The film The Comedians of Comedy, shot during the fall of 2004, had its world premiere at the South by Southwest film festival in March 2005. It is one of the first films to be financed by the DVD-rental service Netflix, also the film's distributor. The film inspired Comedy Central to commission a six-episode Comedians of Comedy television series, involving a six-city tour during the summer of 2005; the show premiered in November of that year. The episodes were shot in Baltimore, New York City, Philadelphia, Atlantic City, Boston and Martha's Vineyard. After ending their run on Comedy Central, Oswalt, Posehn, Mirman and Morgan Murphy performed in a 2006 Comedians of Comedy tour.

The Comedians of Comedy also appeared as one of the Friday opening acts at the 2007 Coachella Valley Arts and Music Festival, including San Francisco Bay Area comedians Brent Weinbach and Jasper Redd.

On October 2, 2007, a DVD of a live performance from the Troubador was released, featuring the cast of the film alongside other notables like Eugene Mirman, Jon Benjamin, David Cross, and others.
