= O2Be =

- Genre: Comedy, satire
- Created by: Lizz Winstead; Brian Unger
- Starring: Lizz Winstead; Brian Unger
- Country of origin: United States
- Original language: English
- No. of seasons: 1
- No. of episodes: 6

Production
- Executive producer: Neal Kendall
- Running time: 23 minutes
- Production company: Payload Industries

Original release
- Network: Oxygen
- Release: September 22 – October 27, 2002

O2Be is an American comedy television series starring Lizz Winstead and Brian Unger. The series premiered September 22, 2002, on Oxygen. The program is a parody of daytime television with Winstead and Unger as hosts of their own talk show.

== Cast ==
- Lizz Winstead as host Lizz Winstead
- Brian Unger as host Brian Unger
- Frank Conniff as TV's Conniff, the stagehand
