= The Writers' Room =

- Presented by: Jim Rash
- Country of origin: United States
- Original language: English
- No. of seasons: 2
- No. of episodes: 12

Production
- Executive producers: Tom Forman; Brad Bishop; Mike Maloy; Neal Kendall; Aliyah Silverstein; Marco Bresaz(season 1)
- Running time: 22 minutes
- Production company: Relativity Television

Original release
- Network: SundanceTV
- Release: July 29, 2013 – June 2, 2014

The Writers' Room is an American television talk show hosted by screenwriter and actor Jim Rash. Each episode features a behind-the-scenes look at the writing staff of popular television series. The series premiered on July 29, 2013.

== Premise ==
Academy Award-winning screenwriter and actor Jim Rash talks with the creators and head writers of prime-time television shows to examine the aura in "the writers' room".

== Episodes ==
Season	Episodes	Originally released	
Season	Episodes	First released	Last released
1	6	July 29, 2013	September 2, 2013
2	6	April 18, 2014	June 2, 2014

=== Season 1 (2013) ===
No. overall	No. in season	Featured show	Panelists	Featured expert	Original release date
1	1	Breaking Bad	Sam Catlin, Bryan Cranston, Vince Gilligan, Peter Gould, Gennifer Hutchison, George Mastras, Thomas Schnauz, and Moira Walley-Beckett	Jess Cagle	July 29, 2013
2	2	Parks and Recreation	Dan Goor, Joe Mande, Amy Poehler, and Michael Schur	Jess Cagle	August 5, 2013
3	3	Dexter	Scott Buck, Sara Colleton, Manny Coto, Michael C. Hall, and Wendy West	Dan Snierson	August 12, 2013
4	4	New Girl	Brett Baer, Dave Finkel, Elizabeth Meriwether, and Jake Johnson	Jess Cagle	August 19, 2013
5	5	Game of Thrones	David Benioff and D. B. Weiss	Jess Cagle	August 26, 2013
6	6	American Horror Story	Brad Falchuk, Tim Minear, Ryan Murphy, and Lily Rabe	Lynette Rice	September 2, 2013

=== Season 2 (2014) ===
No. overall	No. in season	Featured show	Panelists	Original release date
7	1	Scandal	Jenna Bans, Matt Byrne, Heather Mitchell, Shonda Rhimes, Kerry Washington, and Mark Wilding	April 18, 2014
8	2	The Walking Dead, Smallville and other comic book adaptations	Blair Butler, Alfred Gough, Miles Millar, Robert Kirkman, and Michael Schneider	April 25, 2014
9	3	House of Cards	Matt Bai, Laura Eason, John Mankiewicz, Molly Parker, and Beau Willimon	May 2, 2014
10	4	Sons of Anarchy	Mike Daniels, Charles Murray, Katey Sagal, and Kurt Sutter	May 12, 2014
11	5	The Good Wife	Ted Humphrey, Michelle King, Robert King, and Julianna Margulies	May 19, 2014
12	6	Pretty Little Liars	Joseph Dougherty, Oliver Goldstick, I. Marlene King, Shay Mitchell, and Sasha Pieterse	June 2, 2014

== Awards ==
Year	Award	Category	Nominee(s)	Result
2014	Primetime Emmy Award	Outstanding Informational Series or Special	Tom Forman, Brad Bishop, Mike Maloy, Neal Kendall, Aliyah Silverstein, Jim Rash	Nominated
