= List of songs recorded by Puff Johnson =

Alphabetical list of officially released songs recorded by Puff Johnson

This is an alphabetical list of officially released songs by the late R&B singer Puff Johnson.

== Released songs ==
Released songs recorded by Puff Johnson
Song	Other performer(s)	Writer(s)	Originating album	Year	Ref.
"All Because of You"	—N/a	Jermaine Dupri; Rokusuke Ei; Janice M. Johnson; Puff Johnson; Rodney LeMay; Michael McEwan; Hachidai Nakamura; Carl Lowe; Kenny Parker; Lawrence Parker	Miracle	1996	
"All Over Your Face"	—N/a	Jermaine Dupri; Michael McEwan; Carl Lowe	Miracle	1996	
"All That's On My Mind"	—N/a	Kipper Jones; Kenneth Karlin; Carsten Schack	Over and Over	1996	
"Baby Can You Feel It"	—N/a	Puff Johnson; Kenneth Karlin; Kenny Smooth; Darren Whittington	Miracle	1996	
"Come Closer"	—N/a	Tim Kelley; Bob Robinson; Kevin Wales	Miracle	1996	
"Feel So Good"	Somethin' for the People	Arvel McClinton III; Melvin Young; Jeff Young	This Time It's Personal	1996	
"Forever More"	—N/a	Puff Johnson; Sally Jo Dakota; Narada Michael Walden	Miracle	1996	
"God Sent You"	—N/a	Puff Johnson; Sally Jo Dakota; Randy Jackson; Narada Michael Walden	Miracle	1996	
"Hold On to His Hand"	—N/a	Minister K. Ward	Miracle	1996	
"I Like It"	—N/a	Kipper Jones; Kenneth Karlin; Carsten Schack	Forever More	1996	
"Love Between Me & You"	—N/a	Walter Afanasieff; Puff Johnson	Miracle	1996	
"Never Loved Nobody"	—N/a	Sally Jo Dakota; Mike Mani; Tracie Spencer; Narada Michael Walden	Forever More	1996	
"No Strings Attached"	2 One One	—N/a	In Progress	1998	
"Outside My Window"	—N/a	Walter Afanasieff; Renaldo Benson; Al Cleveland; Marvin Gaye; Puff Johnson	Miracle	1996	
"Over and Over"	—N/a	Phil Galdston; Alan Roy Scott; Reed Vertelney	Miracle	1996	
"Please, Help Me, I'm Falling (In Love With You)"	—N/a	Hal Blair; Don Robertson	Miracle	1996	
"Some Kind of Miracle"	—N/a	Diane Warren	Miracle	1996	
"Someday We'll All Be Free"	—N/a	Donny Hathaway; Edward Howard	Promised Land	1994	
"That's When You'll Know"	—N/a	Puff Johnson; Kenneth Karlin; Carsten Schack	Miracle	1996	
"True Meaning of Love"	—N/a	Puff Johnson; Keith Thomas	Miracle	1996	
"What Child Is This"	—N/a	William Chatterton Dix	Joyful Christmas	1994	
"Yearning"	—N/a	Puff Johnson; Tim Kelley; Bob Robinson	Miracle	1996	

== Unreleased songs ==
Song	Other performer(s)	Writer(s)	Intended album	Leak	Ref
"All Day"	—N/a	Puff Johnson; Aaron Farand Phillips; Chucky Thompson	—N/a	No	
"All I Want Is You"	—N/a	Kip Collins; Puff Johnson	—N/a	Yes	
"Alone"	—N/a	Joel Harrington; Puff Johnson	—N/a	No	
"Am I the Only One"	—N/a	Eugene Taylor, Jr. Puff Johnson	—N/a	No	
"Anything"	—N/a	Mark J. Feist; Puff Johnson	—N/a	No	
"Ba Da Da"	—N/a	Eugene Taylor, Jr. Puff Johnson	—N/a	No	
"Baby"	—N/a	Puff Johnson; Jerry Stokes	—N/a	No	
"Bed Rocking"	—N/a	Puff Johnson; Elgin Lumpkin	—N/a	No	
"Best Friend"	—N/a	Puff Johnson	—N/a	No	
"Better Love"	—N/a	Puff Johnson; Jerry Stokes	—N/a	No	
"Can U Be Mine"	—N/a	Adonis Shropshire; Ray Taylor Smith	—N/a	Yes	
"Crazy Over You"	—N/a	Kip Collins; Puff Johnson	—N/a	No	
"Curious"	—N/a	Joel Harrington; Puff Johnson	—N/a	No	
"Fly"	—N/a	Puff Johnson; Gordon Williams	—N/a	No	
"Got a Secret"	—N/a	Puff Johnson; Chucky Thompson	—N/a	No	
"I Find Myself"	—N/a	Mark J. Feist; Puff Johnson	—N/a	No	
"I Wanna Know"	—N/a	Puff Johnson; Troy Oliver	—N/a	No	
"I'm in Heaven"	—N/a	Kashif; Puff Johnson	—N/a	Yes	
"If I Need Your Love"	—N/a	Joel Harrington; Puff Johnson	—N/a	No	
"If You"	—N/a	Puff Johnson; Aaron Farand Phillips; Chucky Thompson	—N/a	No	
"If I Need Your Love"	—N/a	Joel Harrington; Puff Johnson	—N/a	No	
"Love You With a Real Love"	—N/a	Marc Ellus; Puff Johnson; Sylvia Bennett Smith	Miracle	Yes	
"Lovin' All the Things You Do"	—N/a	Puff Johnson; Mark Morales; Cory Rooney	—N/a	No	
"Make a Move"	—N/a	Prince Markie Dee	Miracle	Yes	
"Maybe You Can Be the One for Me"	—N/a	Puff Johnson; Mark Morales; Cory Rooney	—N/a	No	
"Never Stop"	—N/a	—N/a	Miracle	Yes	
"Now That You Are Gone"	—N/a	Walter Afanasieff; Puff Johnson	—N/a	No	
"Premonition"	—N/a	Mark J. Feist; Puff Johnson	—N/a	No	
"Reel to Yourself"	—N/a	Mark J. Feist; Puff Johnson	—N/a	No	
"Say Goodbye"	—N/a	Puff Johnson; Troy Oliver	—N/a	No	
"Seasons Changed"	—N/a	Puff Johnson; Aaron Farand Phillips; Chucky Thompson	—N/a	No	
"So Into You"	—N/a	Puff Johnson; Troy Oliver	—N/a	No	
"Step to Me"	—N/a	Puff Johnson; Troy Oliver	—N/a	No	
"Sunshine"	—N/a	Puff Johnson; Troy Oliver	—N/a	No	
"Take Me Through the Changes"	—N/a	Puff Johnson; Mark Morales; Cory Rooney	—N/a	No	
"Take Our Time"	—N/a	Peter Biker; Puff Johnson; Kenneth Karlin; Carsten Schack	—N/a	No	
"Tell Me Which Way to Go"	—N/a	Puff Johnson; Marlon McClain; Curtis Wilson; Jeff Young	—N/a	No	
"The Hook"	—N/a	Puff Johnson; Aaron Farand Phillips; Chucky Thompson	—N/a	No	
"Thinkin' About You"	—N/a	Puff Johnson; Mark Morales; Cory Rooney	—N/a	No	
"We Can Do the Do"	—N/a	Capucine Jackson; Johnny "J" Jackson; Puff Johnson	—N/a	No	
"When It Comes Down to It"	—N/a	Puff Johnson; Kipper Jones; Kenneth Karlin; Carsten Schack	—N/a	No	
"Why Oh Why"	—N/a	Joel Harrington; Puff Johnson	—N/a	No	
"You Don't Have to Say No More"	—N/a	Dallas Austin; Tim Kelley; Bob Robinson; Colin Wolfe	—N/a	No	
"Your Love"	Rampage	—N/a	—N/a	Yes	
