= First Wives Club =

First Wives Club may refer to:

- The First Wives Club, a 1992 novel by Olivia Goldsmith
  - The First Wives Club, a 1996 American comedy film based on the novel
    - First Wives Club (musical), a 2009 musical based on the film
    - First Wives Club (TV series), a 2019 American TV series based on the film
- First Wives' Club, a 2007 South Korean drama series
