= Dave Barry's Book of Bad Songs =

1997 humor book by Dave Barry

First edition (publ. Andrews McMeel Publishing)

Dave Barry's Book of Bad Songs is a 1997 humor book written by Miami Herald columnist Dave Barry, chronicling the results of his bad song survey. The survey started when he wrote a column about a song he thought was particularly bad (Neil Diamond's "I Am...I Said"), and he got such a response that in addition to a follow-up column, he decided to write an entire book about the results of the survey.

The book opens with a warning that it will "put bad songs into your head" (or at least wake up the ones that are dormant), and suggests that it instead be given to your enemies as a potent psychological weapon. This kind of hyperbole is also found in the book's criticism of cheesy or overly sappy lyrics, and is a hallmark of Barry's writing style.

In the book he acknowledges the results are biased because he had arbitrarily limited the survey to songs that were very popular and at least 10 years old, as well as excluding certain songs including ones that were intentionally terrible (despite this, two songs in the top six did not meet the criteria; "Achy Breaky Heart" had been released only six years prior to the survey, and "Timothy" was a song intentionally written for shock value as a publicity stunt). The survey also likely reflects the demographics of his readership: the large number of middle aged readers resulted in a disproportionate number of oldies being selected.

The worst songs ever, according to the survey, are:

1. "MacArthur Park" as sung by Richard Harris (written by Jimmy Webb)
2. "Yummy Yummy Yummy (I Got Love In My Tummy)" performed by Ohio Express
3. "(You're) Having My Baby" by Paul Anka
4. "Honey" by Bobby Goldsboro
5. "Timothy" by The Buoys (written by Rupert Holmes)
6. "Achy Breaky Heart" by Billy Ray Cyrus

Barry also includes special categories such as:

- Weenie Music
- Love Songs
- Songs Women Really Hate
- Teen Death Songs
- Songs People Get Wrong
