= Timothy (song) =

Song written by Rupert Holmes and recorded by the Buoys in 1971

Single by The Buoys

from the album The Buoys
- B-side: "It Feels Good"
- Released: February 1970
- Recorded: 1970
- Genre: Pop rock
- Length: 2:45
- Label: Scepter
- Songwriter: Rupert Holmes
- Producer: Michael Wright

"Timothy" is a song recorded by American pop rock band The Buoys as a single in 1970. The song describes a mine cave-in and aftermath, with the implication the two survivors cannibalized their companion, the eponymous Timothy. Written by Rupert Holmes, who also performed piano on the song, "Timothy" was conceived from the band being forced to promote their first single without the aid of their label, Scepter Records. Holmes' solution was to have the song generate attention by depicting a controversial subject.

Despite initial efforts from radio stations to ban the song, "Timothy" proved to be a success for the Buoys. It reached the US Billboard Top 40 chart on April 17, 1971, where it remained on the chart for eight weeks and peaked at number 17. On the US Cash Box Top 100, it spent two weeks at number 13. In Canada, the song reached number nine. "Timothy" became the Buoys' best known song and their most successful song to chart on Billboard.

== Origin ==
According to his own account, Rupert Holmes pitched the idea to producer Michael Wright. "The challenge was to write something that could get played, but that some people would ban,” Holmes said. “If I wrote a song where the lyrics were obscene, or I described something sexual that was not allowed in those days, or if there was a clear drug reference, that would not work, because it would just never get played at all.”

== Inspiration ==
Holmes has cited the 1947 country song "Sixteen Tons" (about the hard life of a coal miner) and the 1959 film adaptation of the Tennessee Williams play Suddenly Last Summer (which also contains allusions to cannibalism) as inspirations for "Timothy". He decided to combine the themes of both works into a ballad of three miners — Timothy, Joe, and the singer — trapped by a cave-in, sung in the first person from the perspective of one of the miners. By the time they are rescued, only two survive.

Although the fate of the missing man, Timothy, is never explicitly revealed, it is strongly implied by the fact that the survivors, once hungry and with no access to food and only enough water for two people, show no sign of hunger when they're rescued. Indeed, the singer's "stomach was full as it could be"; how they found food, however, is purposely left blank, and the singer has blacked out the experience leaving him unable to recall how they obtained food or what happened to Timothy (the lyrics make it clear he suspects he and Joe ate Timothy: "God, why don't I know?!").

To make the song appealing to listeners, Holmes disguised the borderline-gruesome lyrics to a degree by juxtaposing them against a light, bouncy melody with a heavy emphasis on brass and string orchestrated and conducted by Howard Reeves.

Although not an official member of The Buoys, Holmes played piano on the song in addition to composing it.

== Unexpected success ==
"Timothy" attracted little attention when it was first released, in large part because Scepter Records did not promote the record. Soon, however, it became popular among young listeners who were able to deduce Timothy's fate from the lyrics. Only as the song became more frequently requested did radio stations begin to take note of it and its unsettling subject matter. Then, just as Holmes and the Buoys had expected, the song started getting banned.

Under normal circumstances, a radio ban would be considered the "kiss of death" for a single's prospects on the US Billboard music charts, which at that time were based heavily on radio airplay. Yet "Timothy" had already attracted such a great following that as some radio stations banned the song, competing stations would pick it up to meet the demand. As a result, instead of dropping off as expected, it continued slowly moving up the Billboard Hot 100 chart.

Once they realized they had a hit record on their hands, Scepter Records executives tried to claim that Timothy was a mule, not a person, in order to get radio stations that had banned the song to reconsider. When asked about this claim, however, Holmes refused to play along with the Scepter executives. Even so, "Timothy" kept climbing the chart, finally peaking at number 17. Holmes' entrepreneurial approach to songwriting had worked better than he, the Buoys, or Scepter Records ever expected.

To appease stations that banned the song, Scepter created two promotional singles with the original version on the A-sides and one of two differently edited versions on the B-sides. One edit revises the lyric "My stomach was full as it could be" to "Both of us fine as we could be". The second version includes the "stomach" lyric but bleeps out the word "hell" in the second verse. The record labels (in black and white for promotional issues) indicate these versions under the song title as "Revised Lyric" (SDR-12275) and "Edited, Bleeped Out" (SDJ-12275), respectively. There is no known version with both edits in the same mix.

The success of "Timothy" and its writer's methods may have worked too well for the Buoys' sake. Although Scepter did re-sign the band to record an album, they were left with the problem of how to follow up on a hit song as unusual as "Timothy". Ultimately, the Buoys proved unable to duplicate that feat, though they did manage one minor hit with "Give Up Your Guns" (also co-written by Holmes) before disbanding. Two of the Buoys went on to form Dakota, a band with a modest following in the 1980s. Meanwhile, Holmes continued his career as a songwriter and, by the end of the decade, as a successful recording artist in his own right, having two top-ten hits with "Escape (The Piña Colada Song)" in late 1979 and "Him" in 1980.

== Sheppton Mine disaster ==
Many have drawn connections between the Sheppton mining disaster and "Timothy", but Holmes has dismissed these, saying he was not even aware of Sheppton until after the song was released and claimed he probably would not have written it if he did know. In an interview, Holmes said, "If I had known about [Sheppton] at the time, I probably never would have written the song, because I don’t want to make fun of something that’s tragic. I sadly found out there was a parallel in reality, but only after the fact. It never occurred to me that there could be anything quite like that." Buoys lead singer Bill Kelly backed up this account, stating "Rupert never knew anything about Sheppton. The correlation between the incident and the song are totally random."

== Charts ==
=== Weekly charts ===
Chart (1970–71)	Peak position
Canada Top Singles (RPM)	9
US Billboard Hot 100	17
US Cash Box Top 100	13

=== Year-end charts ===
Chart (1971)	Rank
US Billboard Hot 100	87

== References in popular culture ==
- "Timothy" is mentioned prominently in humorist Dave Barry's bad song survey as one of the worst songs of all time.
- In the Mystery Science Theater 3000 episode, featuring the science fiction horror film Monster A Go-Go (1965), Crow and Servo are discussing Rupert Holmes' "Piña Colada Song", and Joel Robinson asserts that, as a pop songwriter, Holmes always wrote about contemporary popular trends. The bots retort by citing "Timothy" ("That was about cannibalism. When was that popular?"), but Joel assures the bots that it is a "well-known fact that Timothy was a duck". In the episode featuring the film Quest of the Delta Knights (1993), one scene depicts the characters Tee and Leonardo moving a large stone from the entrance to a cave. When the two begin to walk into the cave, Mike riffs, "Timothy, where on earth did you go?"
- The song was used in the first episode of season three of Channel Zero, an American horror anthology television series on SYFY.
- "Timothy" plays on the car radio during an awkward "intimate" scene in the film Raising Buchanan (2019).
- "Timothy" can be heard in "The Road to Cincinnati" episode of The Simpsons that aired Nov. 29, 2020.

== See also ==
- Cannibalism in popular culture
