= Jim Boyer (sound engineer) =

American audio engineer (1951–2022)

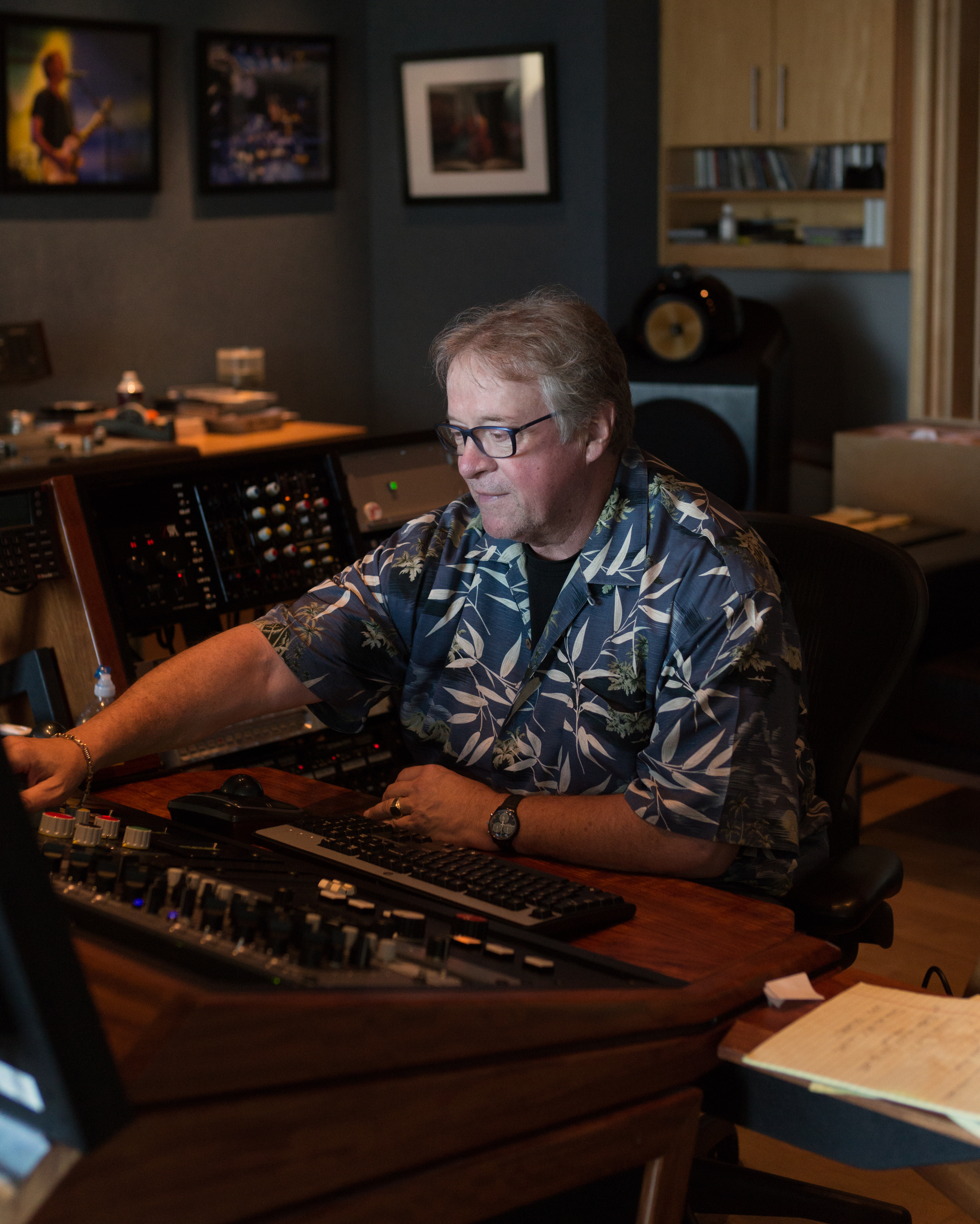

Background information
- Born: May 19, 1951; Lebanon, Pennsylvania, U.S.
- Died: June 15, 2022 (aged 71) San Francisco Bay area, California, U.S.
- Occupations: Audio engineer, record producer

James Boyer (May 19, 1951 – June 15, 2022) was an American audio engineer, known for having recorded and mixed many recordings including Billy Joel's The Stranger, 52nd Street and The Nylon Curtain, and the soundtracks for Yentl and Silkwood, as well as producing Billy Joel's The Matter of Trust: A Bridge to Russia, Rupert Holmes' Partners in Crime and Peter Cetera's Peter Cetera.

== Biography ==
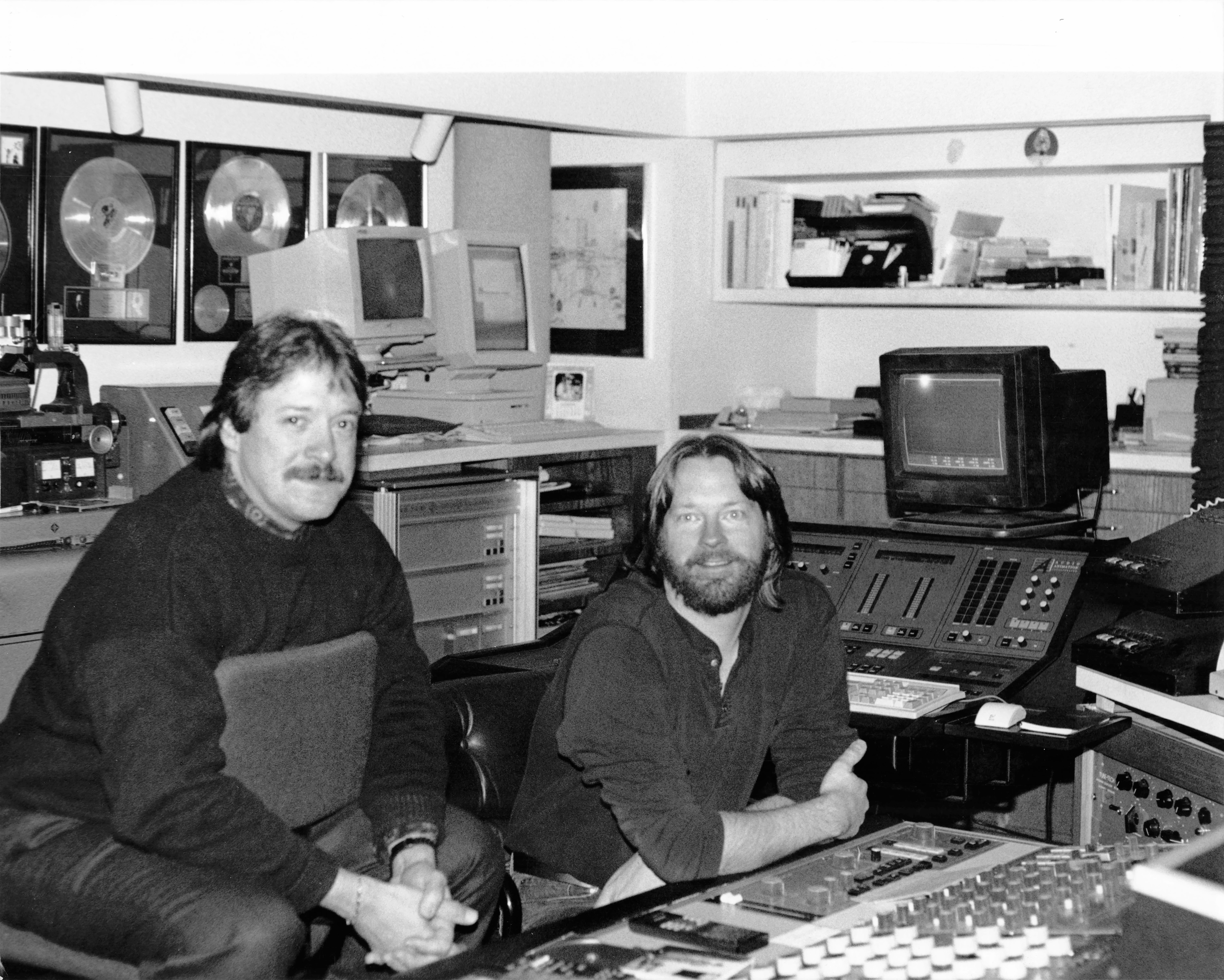
Boyer (left) and Ted Jensen at Sterling Sound, NYC, 1991

Boyer was born in Lebanon, Pennsylvania, and graduated from Cedar Crest High School and went on to earn a Bachelor of Electrical Engineering degree from the University of Delaware in 1973. During his high school and college years, he played keyboards in a number of east coast regional bands including Rain, which he was with from 1970 to 1975. Boyer attended and graduated from the Institute of Audio Research to prepare him for work in the business. His first job in the industry was at Phil Ramone's A&R Recording Studios where he was hired by Don Frey as an assistant engineer. Initially, he assisted on commercial jingles with engineers Elliot Scheiner and Don Hahn. Soon after, Boyer became Phil Ramone's assistant engineer. His first credit with Ramone was on the film A Star is Born with Barbra Streisand and Kris Kristofferson. Over the years, Boyer engineered many of Billy Joel's records including The Stranger, 52nd Street, The Nylon Curtain and An Innocent Man as well as produced Joel's documentary, The Matter of Trust: A Bridge to Russia and Kohuept [live], Rupert Holmes' Partners in Crime featuring "Escape (The Piña Colada Song)" and "Him"/"Get Outta Yourself", and Peter Cetera's Peter Cetera.

In 1987, Boyer, along with David Dering, founded AmericanHelix, a primary CD manufacturer for the independent record label industry. After it was sold, Boyer worked in Silicon Valley as a software services sales executive, and 2015 found him returning to Pro Tools studio mixing, live concert technical management and FOH mixing for a number of Bay area communities during their summer concert seasons.

Boyer died in the San Francisco Bay area of California on June 15, 2022.

== Selected works ==
Recording and mixing

- 1977 Celebrate Me Home – Kenny Loggins
- 1977 Never Letting Go – Phoebe Snow
- 1977 Marquee Moon – Television
- 1977 The Stranger – Billy Joel (Just The Way You Are-Grammy for Record and Song of the Year)
- 1977 Futures – Burt Bacharach
- 1977 Libby Titus – Libby Titus
- 1977 Watermark – Art Garfunkel
- 1978 Hot Streets – Chicago
- 1978 52nd Street – Billy Joel (Grammy for Album of the Year, Best Male Pop Vocal Performance)
- 1978 Angie – Angela Bofill
- 1978 Love Is The Stuff – Henry Gross
- 1978 Ruby Ruby – Gato Barbieri
- 1979 Chicago 13 – Chicago
- 1979 Partners in Crime – Rupert Holmes
- 1979 Browne Sugar – Tom Browne
- 1979 Ready and Waiting – Vivian Reed
- 1979 Morning Island – Sadao Watanabe
- 1980 Glass Houses – Billy Joel
- 1980 Out of Control – Peter Criss
- 1980 How's Everything – Sadao Watanabe
- 1980 Won't Let Go – Brooklyn Dreams
- 1980 Late In The Evening – Paul Simon
- 1981 Songs in the Attic – Billy Joel
- 1981 Peter Cetera – Peter Cetera
- 1981 Get Wet – Get Wet
- 1982 The Nylon Curtain – Billy Joel
- 1982 The Hunter – Joe Sample
- 1982 In Harmony II – Various (Grammy for Best Recording for Children)
- 1983 An Innocent Man – Billy Joel
- 1983 Such is Love – Peter, Paul & Mary
- 1983 Rhythm Hymn – Whitren Cartwright
- 1984 Dangerous Moments – Martin Briley
- 1984 20/20 – George Benson
- 1984 Secrets & Sins – Luba
- 1985 Lovelines – The Carpenters
- 1985 Gettin' Away With Murder – Patti Austin
- 1986 The Bridge – Billy Joel
- 1986 Back in the High Life – Steve Winwood
- 1986 Only Love Remains – Paul McCartney
- 1987 Whitney – Whitney Houston
- 1987 At Home – Janis Siegel
- 1987 Kohuept – Billy Joel
- 1988 Twice the Love – George Benson
- 1988 Talkin' 'Bout You – Diane Schuur
- 1990 No Separate Love – Roland Vazquez

Film scores and soundtracks

- 1976 A Star Is Born – Barbra Streisand and Kris Kristofferson
- 1980 One-Trick Pony – Paul Simon
- 1981 Arthur – Burt Bacharach
- 1983 Silkwood – Georges Delerue
- 1983 Yentl – Barbra Streisand
- 1983 Easy Money – Billy Joel
- 1987 Orphans – Michael Small
- 1988 The Serpent and the Rainbow – Olatunji

Broadway albums

- 1978 Eubie!
- 1980 Live from New York – Gilda Radner

Radio and television

- 1978 Saturday Night Live – Billy Joel
- 1978 Kennedy Center Inaugural Broadcast
- 1982 The Concert in Central Park – Simon and Garfunkel (post production)
- 1987 Live Broadcasts from Moscow and Leningrad

Production

- 1979 Partners in Crime – Rupert Holmes
- 1981 Peter Cetera – Peter Cetera
- 1987The Matter of Trust: A Bridge to Russia – Billy Joel
- 1987 Kohuept [live] – Billy Joel
