= Miracle (Puff Johnson album) =

Studio album by Puff Johnson
- Released: May 28, 1996
- Genres: R&B, CCM
- Length: 54:46
- Label: Work
- Producers: Walter Afanasieff; Jermaine Dupri; Dan Shea; Kenny Smooth; Soulshock & Karlin; Keith Thomas; Tim & Bob; Narada Michael Walden

Singles from Miracle
- 1. "Forever More" Released: April 30, 1996; 2. "All Over Your Face" Released: May 1996; 3. "Over and Over" Released: September 10, 1996

Miracle is the only studio album by American singer Puff Johnson. It was released by Work Group on May 28, 1996 in the United States. Johnson worked with a broadranging cast of producers and songwriters on her debut, including Narada Michael Walden, Tim & Bob, Jermaine Dupri, Walter Afanasieff, Dan Shea, and Keith Thomas, and co-wrote seven of the set's twelve tracks. Their collaborations led to eclectic material on Miracle, which borrowed from an assortment of genres, combining contemporary R&B with pop, jazz, fusion and G-funk.

The album earned mixed to positive reviews from music critics, many of whom praised Johnson's vocal performances but found the material uneven. Upon release, it peaked at number seven on the Norwegian Albums Chart and entered the top thirty in the Netherlands. In the US, it reached number 61 on Billboard's Top R&B/Hip-Hop Albums only. Miracle spawned three singles, including the top five hit "Forever More" and follow-up "All Over Your Face" as well as "Over and Over" which had first appeared on the soundtrack of the American comedy film The First Wives Club (1996).

== Critical reception ==
Professional ratings
Review scores
Source	Rating
Los Angeles Times	3/4 stars
Muzik	5/5 stars

Peter Miro from Cash Box called Miracle an "excellent debut [...] Johnson sparkles with freshness, innocence and clarity unheard of in an artist 22 years young. [She] mesmerizes with her narrative skill as she sings ballads that will charge hard up urban and crossover playlists [...] Johnson leaves a lot to be excited." In his review for The New York Beacon, Don Thomas described Miracle as "out-of-this-world beautiful." Writing for Los Angeles Times, Connie Johnson remarked that "Johnson doesn't write love songs for cynics. There's a sweeping romanticism to this 22-year-old's music, in which she compares loved ones to miracles and angels. In the hands of a Celine Dion or Mariah Carey, ballads such as "Forever More" would have been wrung free of every ounce of drama. Johnson's more subtle treatment gives her often lofty and ethereal ideas about the search for one's soul mate some down-to-earth realism and charm."

Billboard editor J.R. Reynolds wrote: "Youthful enthusiasm bubbles from the artist's spiritually laced vocals, splattering refreshing doses of optimism into the listener's consciousness." Deborah Gregory, writing for Vibe, found that "while Miracle doesn't quite live up to the loftiness of its title — due to the saccharine melodies and middle-of-the-road material — there's no doubt about [Johnson's] pipes. This 23-year-old angel can croon [...] The cuts that provide the freshest foil for Johnson's pitch-perfect voice are "All Over Your Face" and "True Meaning of Love." Both of these silky R&B grooves are better than the predictable pining of first single "Forever More." St. Petersburg Times editor Erika N. Duckworth noted that while Johnson's voice was "engaging" and often ahead of the material, much of Miracle was "pretty likable." She suggested that her vocals deserved stronger material in future projects.

== Commercial performance ==
Upon release, Miracle peaked at number seven on the Norwegian Albums Chart and entered the top thirty in the Netherlands. In the United States, the album reached number 61 on Billboard's Top R&B/Hip-Hop Albums only. It also reached number 34 on the US Heatseekers Album chart.

== Track listing ==
Miracle — Standard edition
No.	Title	Writer(s)	Producer(s)	Length
1.	"Forever More"	Puff Johnson; Sally Jo Dakota; Narada Michael Walden	Walden	5:06
2.	"Outside My Window"	P. Johnson; Walter Afanasieff; Renaldo Benson; Al Cleveland; Marvin Gaye	Afanasieff; Dan Shea^{[a]}	5:25
3.	"All Over Your Face"	Carl Lowe; Jermaine Dupri; Michael McEwan	Dupri; So-Lowe^{[b]}	3:46
4.	"Yearning"	P. Johnson; Tim Kelley; Bob Robinson	Tim & Bob	5:11
5.	"Love Between Me & You"	Johnson; Afanasieff	Afanasieff	4:49
6.	"Some Kind of Miracle"	Diane Warren	Afanasieff	6:20
7.	"All Because of You"	P. Johnson; Dupri; Lowe; Lawrence Parker; Kenny Parker; Rodney LeMay; Hachidai Nakamura; Rokusuke Ei; Janice M. Johnson	Dupri; So-Lowe^{[b]}	3:32
8.	"God Sent You"	Dakota; P. Johnson; Walden; Randy Jackson	Walden	5:04
9.	"True Meaning of Love"	P. Johnson; Keith Thomas	Thomas	4:44
10.	"Come Closer"	Kevin Wales; Kelley; Robinson	Tim & Bob	4:43
11.	"Please, Help Me, I'm Falling (In Love With You)"	Hal Blair; Don Robertson	Thomas	3:42
12.	"Hold On to His Hand"	Minister K. Ward	Tim & Bob	2:24
Total length:				54:46

Japan bonus track
No.	Title	Writer(s)	Producer(s)	Length
1.	"That's When You'll Know"	Kipper Jones; Carsten Schack; Kenneth Karlin	Soulshock & Karlin	5:00

Disc 2: Miracle — Australian limited edition
No.	Title	Writer(s)	Producer(s)	Length
1.	"Over and Over"	Phil Galdston; Reed Vertelney; Alan Roy Scott	Thomas	3:58
2.	"All That's On My Mind"	Jones; Schack; Karlin	Soulshock & Karlin	3:41
3.	"Baby Can You Feel It"	P. Johnson; Kenny Smooth; Darren Whittington	Smooth	3:12

Notes

- ^{^a} denotes associate producer
- ^{^b} denotes co-producer

Samples

- "Outside My Window" contains a sample from "What's Going On" as performed by Marvin Gaye.
- "All Because of You" contains a sample of "Hip Hop vs. Rap" as performed by KRS-One.

== Charts ==
Chart performance for Miracle
Chart (1996)	Peak position
Australian Albums (ARIA)	51
Dutch Albums (Album Top 100)	28
Norwegian Albums (VG-lista)	7
US Heatseekers Albums (Billboard)	34
US Top R&B/Hip-Hop Albums (Billboard)	61
