= Partners in Crime (album) =

1979 studio album by Rupert Holmes

Studio album by Rupert Holmes
- Released: August 5, 1979
- Recorded: January–July 1979
- Studios: Plaza Sound Studios, New York City
- Genres: Soft rock; pop rock; yacht rock
- Length: 42:40
- Labels: Infinity; MCA
- Producers: Rupert Holmes, Jim Boyer

Rupert Holmes chronology
Pursuit of Happiness (1978)	Partners in Crime (1979)	Adventure (1980)

Singles from Partners in Crime
- 1. "Escape (The Pina Colada Song)" Released: September 17, 1979; 2. "Him" Released: January 7, 1980; 3. "Answering Machine" Released: 1980

Professional ratings
Review scores
Source	Rating
AllMusic	4.5/5 stars
Record Mirror	3.5/5 stars
Smash Hits	7/10

Partners in Crime is the fifth studio album by British-American singer-songwriter and musician Rupert Holmes, released on August 5, 1979. The album was Holmes's most commercially successful record and includes all three of Holmes's solo top 40 hits: "Him", "Answering Machine", and "Escape (The Piña Colada Song)". "Escape" was the top Billboard hit of December 1979 and January 1980; it was the only single to hold the number-one position in both years and in different decades. Although "Escape (The Piña Colada Song)" was released as a single on Infinity Records, "Him" was released on MCA Records; the Infinity catalog had been absorbed by MCA at the time the latter single was released. The album itself reached number 33 on the Billboard 200.

== Track listing ==
All songs are written and arranged by Rupert Holmes.

Partners in Crime track listing
No.	Title	Length
1.	"Escape (The Piña Colada Song)"	4:36
2.	"Partners in Crime"	5:16
3.	"Nearsighted"	2:52
4.	"Lunch Hour"	4:40
5.	"Drop It"	4:12
6.	"Him"	4:06
7.	"Answering Machine"	3:35
8.	"The People that You Never Get to Love"	3:47
9.	"Get Outta Yourself"	4:45
10.	"In You I Trust"	4:51
Total length:		42:40

== Personnel ==
=== Musicians ===
- Rupert Holmes – vocals, keyboards, synthesizer, saxophone
- Dean Bailin – guitar
- Frank Gravis – bass
- Leo Adamian – drums (all tracks), double drums (track 1)
- Victoria – percussion
- Peter Gordon – French horn
- Wayne Andre – trombone
- Dave Taylor – bass trombone
- The Gene Orloff Section – strings
- Steve Jordan – double drums (track 1)
- Chrissy Faith – background vocals (track 7)
- Bob Gurland – voiced trumpet (track 9)

=== Production ===
- Rupert Holmes – production
- Jim Boyer – production, engineering, mixing
- Eric Bloch – associate engineering
- Ollie Cotton – associate engineering
- Ted Jensen – mastering
- Normand Kurtz – executive production

=== Artwork ===
- Peter Corriston – art direction, cover concept and design
- Brian Hagiwara – photography

== Chart performance ==
Chart performance for Partners in Crime
Chart (1979)	Peak position
Australian Albums (Kent Music Report)	59
Canada Top Albums/CDs (RPM)	24
Dutch Albums (Album Top 100)	33
US Billboard 200	33

== Certifications ==
Certifications for Partners in Crime
Region	Certification	Certified units/sales
Canada (Music Canada)	Gold	50,000^{^}
United States (RIAA)	Gold	500,000^{^}
^{^} Shipments figures based on certification alone.
