= Dakota (band) =

American rock band

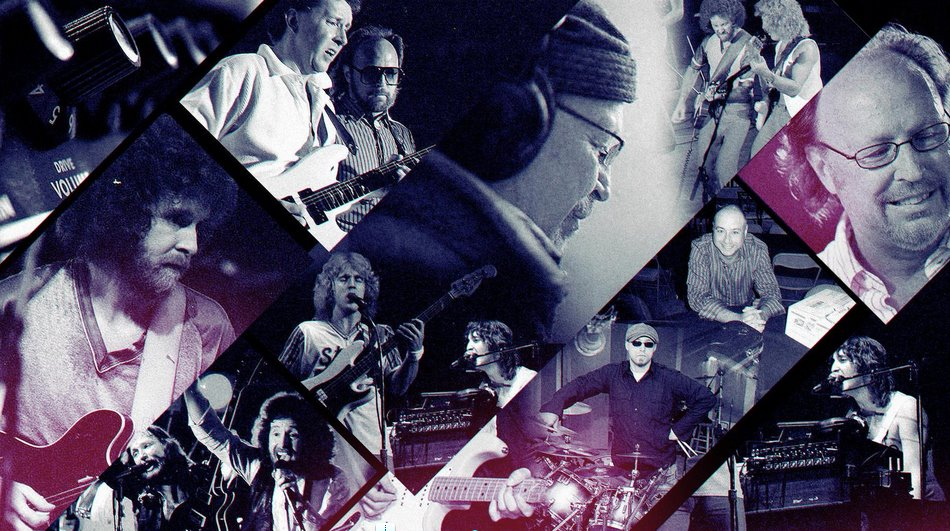
- Website banner for Dakota website

Background information
- Origin: United States
- Genre: AOR
- Years active: 1979–1987, 2015
- Labels: Columbia; MCA
- Spinoffs: Jerry-Kelly
- Spinoff of: The Buoys
- Past members: Jerry Hludzik (deceased); Bill Kelly (deceased); John Lorance; Eli Hludzik

Dakota was an American based melodic rock group, initially active during the late 1970s and early 1980s. Dakota first achieved moderate success with their 1980 self-titled album Dakota, but the band's popularity increased rapidly while performing as the opening act for Queen on their 1980–1981 The Game Tour.

The band released their second and best-selling AOR album, titled Runaway, in 1984. The band experienced several line-up changes during the 1980s and eventually stopped performing in 1987. During the 1990s and 2000s original member Jerry Hludzik continued to record a number of records under the Dakota name, featuring guest musicians, friends and also his son Eli Hludzik.

In 2014, original members Jerry Hludzik and Bill Kelly reunited and teamed up with Jon Lorance and Eli Hludzik to record a new Dakota album titled Long Road Home, which was released on October 30, 2015.

In 2026, the band was announced as an inductee into the Luzerne County Arts & Entertainment Hall of Fame.

== Origins ==
The origins of Dakota can be traced back as far as the early 1970s in North East Pennsylvania, USA, to a band called The Buoys and a million-selling single called "Timothy". The song, written by Rupert Holmes, was supposedly about the local Sheppton mine disaster of 1963, though Holmes has denied it and said it was a coincidence. It reached the Billboard Top 40 chart on April 17, 1971, remaining on the chart for eight weeks, peaking at No. 17, as listed in The Billboard Book of Top 40 Hits by Joel Whitburn. The Buoys were spearheaded by lead singer and guitarist Bill Kelly and Jerry Hludzik on guitar and supporting vocals.

In 1978 Bill and Jerry left the group and teamed up as the Jerry-Kelly band, making use of members from popular local bands. That same year the band was signed to Epic Records under the production team of Danny Seraphine (Chicago drummer at the time), and David "Hawk" Wolinski of Rufus, to record Somebody Else's Dream, the first and only Jerry-Kelly album. By 1979, with the band's next scheduled release due, Columbia records insisted that the band change its name and after several options were discussed Dakota was chosen. Jerry-Kelly drummer, Gary Driscoll, left the band in early 1980, the band having no permanent drummer as a result. Producers Danny Seraphine and Hawk Wolinski drafted in Rufus drummer John Robinson, and produced Dakota's first self-titled album Dakota, with the track "If It Takes All Night" becoming the band's first single to receive regional airplay, peaking at No. 78 on the Billboard Chart in 1980.

== The Game Tour (1980) ==
Long-time friend of Bill and Jerry, Michael Stahl, who was working with Queen on their 1980 The Game Tour, managed to secure Dakota as the opening act for Queen on their 35-date tour. Dakota's lineup now consisted of Jerry Hludzik and Bill Kelly on guitars and vocals, Bill McHale on bass, Jeff Mitchell on keyboards, Lou Cossa on keys and guitar and new drummer Tony Romano. During the tour a feud between Columbia Records and the band Chicago developed and Dakota's association with Chicago founding member, Danny Seraphine (who produced their first single), led to the band receiving lackluster backing from Columbia Records for the remainder of their time at the label.

== Runaway (1984) ==
After the 1980–1981 The Game Tour was over, and without tour support, the band lost several members, including Bill McHale, Jeff Mitchell, Lou Cossa and Tony Romano. Auditions for replacements were held during January and February 1982. Keyboard player and guitarist Rick Manwiller, previously from progressive rock band Steph, joined early that year. After working on new material during 1982, Dakota traveled to Los Angeles in early 1983 to record their second album, titled Runaway (MCA-5502) on the MCA label, engineered by Humberto Gatica and produced by Danny Seraphine. The lineup consisted of Jerry Hludzik and Bill Kelly on guitars and vocals, Danny Seraphine on drums and Rick Manwiller on keys. Several guest and session artists also appeared on the album, including guitarists Richie Zito and Paul Jackson, bassist Neil Stubenhaus, Rolling Stones sax-player Ernie Watts, Chicago vocalist Bill Champlin, Chicago keyboardist Robert Lamm and Toto keyboardist Steve Porcaro. Runaway was released in 1984, but in the absence of promotional- and tour backing from MCA Records the album did not achieve the chart success the band anticipated.

In 2002 Runaway was re-released on compact disc and in digital format and soon garnered acclaim from critics and fans alike as one of the most underrated AOR records of the 1980s. In 2011 Swedish based band Houston covered the title track from the Runaway album for inclusion on their Relaunch album. The single was featured in the Red Bull short film Danny MacAskill's Imaginate in 2013.

== Hiatus (1987) ==
Due to the strained relations with Columbia Records, as well as personal differences between band members, Dakota played their final performance of the 1980s at Scranton's Montage Amphitheater in 1987 in front of roughly 7,000 fans. The band stopped performing, while band members pursued personal projects. During the 1990s and 2000s original member Jerry Hludzik continued to record three more records under the Dakota name, featuring a variety of session musicians, friends and also his son Eli Hludzik, achieving success in Europe and Japan.

== Reunion (2014) ==
In 2014 original members Jerry Hludzik and Bill Kelly reunited and teamed up with Jon Lorance and Eli Hludzik to record a new Dakota album titled Long Road Home, which was released on 30 October 2015.

== Discography ==
=== Studio albums ===
- 1980: Dakota
- 1984: Runaway
- 1996: Mr Lucky
- 1997: The Last Standing Man
- 2000: Little Victories
- 2003: Deep 6
- 2015: Long Road Home

=== Compilation albums ===
- 2000: Three Live Times Ago...
