= Swango =

Swango may refer to:

- Juliet Swango, a founder of The Rondelles indiepop band
- Michael Swango (born 1954), American serial killer doctor
- Swango (album), a 1998 album by Candye Kane
  - Swango, a song from Candye Kane's album Swango
- Swango (musical), a 2002 musical by Rupert Holmes
- Nikki Swango, a character in the third season of the anthology series Fargo
