= Sheppton Mine disaster and rescue =

1963 mine collapse and rescue in Pennsylvania, United States

The Sheppton Mine disaster and rescue in Sheppton, Pennsylvania, United States, took place on August 13, 1963. It was one of the first rescues of trapped miners accomplished by raising them through holes bored through solid rock, garnering media attention.

== Background ==
The roof of the Sheppton anthracite coal mine collapsed August 13, 1963 trapping three miners 300 feet below ground. A small borehole was drilled from the surface in an attempt to contact the miners. After several days a borehole successfully reached a mine, and revealed that two of the miners, Henry Throne and David Fellin, had survived in a small, narrow chamber.

Rescuers dropped provisions to the miners and subsequent larger boreholes were made, including the final large hole bored with the assistance of billionaire Howard Hughes. The two surviving miners were successfully raised to the surface on August 27. Attempts to contact the third miner, Louis Bova, were unsuccessful.

== Memorialization and legacy ==
In 2015, a Pennsylvania state historical marker was installed near the site where Louis Bova is entombed. That same year, the book Sheppton: The Myth, Miracle & Music, explored themes of the miraculous and supernatural at the Sheppton disaster site. After they were rescued, Throne and Fellin related similar stories of having seen human-like figures (including the recently deceased Pope John XXIII), crosses, stairs, and other religious imagery. While the shared visions were similar, they varied enough in the details to suggest the miners had experienced folie à deux.

== "Timothy" song ==
In 1971, The Buoys recorded a hit single, "Timothy", about three miners trapped underground due to a cave-in, with only two surviving and a strong implication they stayed alive by cannibalizing the third. This led many to assume the song was inspired by the Sheppton disaster. However, songwriter Rupert Holmes insisted he had never heard of the incident and would not have written the song if he had. Lead singer Bill Kelly has backed up this account.
