= First Wives Club (musical) =

- Music: Brian Holland, Lamont Dozier, Eddie Holland
- Lyrics: Brian Holland, Lamont Dozier, Eddie Holland
- Book: Rupert Holmes; Linda Bloodworth-Thomason
- Basis: 1996 film The First Wives Club
- Productions: 2009 San Diego, California; 2015 Chicago, Illinois

First Wives Club is a musical with music and lyrics by Brian Holland, Lamont Dozier, and Eddie Holland. The musical is based on Olivia Goldsmith's 1992 novel and the 1996 movie adaptation.

The musical premiered in San Diego, California, in 2009, with a book by Rupert Holmes. A reworked version was produced in Chicago in 2015, with a new book by Linda Bloodworth-Thomason.

== Background & Development ==
In 2005, theatrical producers Paul Lambert and Jonas Neilson announced plans to adapt Olivia Goldsmith's 1992 novel and the 1996 Paramount Pictures film into a stage musical.

Brian and Eddie Holland and Lamont Dozier left Motown Records in 1968 after writing 28 Top 10 songs together and formed Holland–Dozier–Holland Productions, Inc., a production and songwriting company. By 1972, Dozier departed. Prior to the project's launch, the Holland brothers and Dozier were engaged in separate conversations and meetings initiated by Creative Artists Agency Theater Division Co-Head Michael Cardonick. The talent agent convinced the legendary trio to reunite. Holland-Dozier-Holland signed with CAA, led by Cardonick, to develop stage and film projects.

To compose the music and lyrics, the producers enlisted the Motown songwriting trio Holland–Dozier–Holland, writing together for othe first time since their 1972 split. Subsequently, Cardonick suggested that his client, Rupert Holmes, write the book. The producers agreed. They also hired Francesca Zambello as director and Lisa Stevens as choreographer. Following developmental readings, the production had premieres at Old Globe Theatre in San Diego in July 2009.

After the San Diego engagement, the musical did not transfer directly to New York; instead, it l underwent substantial creative retooling. Television writer and producer Linda Bloodworth-Thomason replaced Holmes as bookwriter, restructuring the script and incorporating several classic Motown catalog hits alongside Holland–Dozier–Holland's newly written songs, while Simon Phillips replaced Zambello as director for a 2015 pre-Broadway run in Chicago.

== Plot ==
The musical centers on three estranged former college friends—Annie, Brenda, and Elise—who reunite in middle age at the funeral of their fourth college friend, Cynthia, after she dies by suicide following her husband leaving her for a younger woman.

Reconnecting after years apart, the three women realize they have all been cast aside by their philandering husbands for younger "trophy" partners: Annie's husband, Aaron, has left her for his marriage therapist; Brenda helped build her husband Morty's retail empire before he traded her for a younger spokesmodel; and Elise, an aging performer, faces financial ruin as her producer husband, Bill, sues her for alimony.

Forming the "First Wives Club", Annie, Brenda, and Elise band together to support one another, reclaim their self-esteem, and exact financial revenge on their ex-husbands—including a scheme to leverage Morty's young girlfriend, Shelley, at a Sotheby's art auction to gain control of their assets.

== Productions ==
=== San Diego ===
The premiere opened at the Old Globe Theatre in San Diego, California, on July 17, 2009, in previews, through August 23, 2009. prior to a projected Broadway engagement. Many songs in the score (including the first four musical numbers) were Motown hits composed by H-D-H; they also composed original songs for the musical, which were especially prominent in act 2. Francesca Zambello directed. Zambello was engaged for the project in 2006. An industry reading of the musical was held in February 2009, with principals Ana Gasteyer, Carolee Carmello and Adriane Lenox.

The San Diego cast included Karen Ziemba as Annie, Sheryl Lee Ralph as Elise, Barbara Walsh as Brenda, John Dossett as Aaron, Kevyn Morrow as Bill, Brad Oscar as Morty, Sara Chase as Trophy Wife, and Sam Harris as Duane. Lisa Stevens choreographed, with scenic design by Peter J. Davison and costumes by Paul Tazewell. The production received mixed to negative reviews.

=== Chicago ===
The musical was reworked and a new production opened in Chicago in March 2015 at the Oriental Theatre with a book re-written by Linda Bloodworth-Thomason. Originating producers Jonas Neilson and Paul Lambert teamed with Elizabeth Williams and John Frost; Simon Phillips directed.

The critics praised the leading women, Faith Prince, Christine Sherrill, and Carmen Cusack. Around the Town Chicago's Alan Bresloff stated that "Faith Prince has great comic timing, Carmen Cusack, a flair for the comedy as well, and Christine Sherrill is, as always, divine." Variety's review found that "the combination of '90s sitcom zingers [by Linda Bloodworth-Thomason] and [Holland-Dozier-Holland's] '60s Motown sound makes for an odd juxtaposition." Although producers had aimed to transfer the musical to Broadway, it also did not transfer. The production closed after its final performance on March 29, 2015.

== Musical numbers ==
Act I

- "Stop! In the Name of Love" – Elise, Cynthia
- "Reach Out" – Young Cynthia, Brenda, Annie, and Elise
- "I Can't Help Myself (Sugar Pie Honey Bunch)" – Young Girl, Bill, Aaron, and Morty
- "Forever Came Today" – Young Husbands and Wives
- "Forever Came Today" (reprise) – Cynthia
- "I'm So Lucky" – Annie, Brenda, Elise
- "I'm Not That Kind of Girl" – Cassandra and the Boys
- "Stir It Up" – Dr. Leslie Rosen
- "My Heart Wants to Try One More Time" – Brenda
- "Stir It Up" (reprise) – Club Singers
- "Whirlpool of Emotions" – Annie
- "My World Is Empty Without You" – Cynthia, Brenda, Annie, and Elise
- "Shoulder to Shoulder" – Annie, Elise, and Brenda

Act II

- "Morty Is the Best" – Morty, Shelley, Ensemble
- "I'm So Lucky" (several reprises) – various
- "I Am Duarto" – Duane
- "One Sweet Moment" – Elise, Brenda, Annie, Aaron, Bill, and Morty
- "Remember Jerusalem" – Jason, Ensemble
- "Payback's a Bitch" – Brenda, Elise, Annie, Duane, Shelley, Ensemble
- "Old Me New Me (Part 1)" – Bill
- "Old Me New Me (Part 2)" – Aaron
- "Old Me New Me (Part 3)" – Morty
- "Finale" – Elise, Annie, Brenda, Ensemble

== See also ==
- First Wives Club, 2019 non-musical TV series based on the 1996 film.
