= Murder Your Employer =

2023 novel by Rupert Holmes

Murder Your Employer: The McMasters Guide to Homicide
- Author: Rupert Holmes
- Genre: Crime fiction
- Publisher: Avid Reader
- Publication date: 2023
- ISBN: 9781451648218
- Website: https://www.rupertholmes.com/murder-your-employer/

Murder Your Employer: The McMasters Guide to Homicide is a mystery novel by Rupert Holmes, published in 2023. Murder Your Employer was No. 6 on the New York Times bestseller list, No. 6 in new releases on the international bestsellers list in Canada, No. 9 on Publishers Weekly bestsellers list, and No. 7 on USA Today bestseller list. The audiobook version of Murder Your Employer was a finalist in 2024 for the Audie Award for Mystery.

Murder Your Employer is the first volume of a series; Holmes plans to release a sequel titled Murder Your Mate.

== Summary ==
McMasters Conservatory for the Applied Arts is a secretive school in an undisclosed location where individuals learn how to commit murder (or deletions, the term preferred by the school). Set in the 1950s and narrated by the dean of McMasters, Harbinger Harrow, Murder Your Employer follows the education of three students.

Cliff Iverson, an aircraft design engineer, is determined to murder his supervisor who had driven two of his co-workers to suicide and added critical design flaws to Iverson's aircraft design to save on costs. Gemma Lindley is being blackmailed by her supervisor who suspects Gemma of killing her dying father to alleviate his suffering. Dulcie Mown, a well-known Hollywood actress, is tormented by a predatory studio head.

After the three students complete their course of studies, they leave McMasters to finish their "thesis" (the murders). They will not all succeed.

== Reception ==
Reviewers note how Holmes incorporates dry humor in Murder Your Employer. Syndicated critic Oline Cogdill calls the novel droll and irreverent. In the Los Angeles Times, Bethanne Patrick describes it as "a funny, fast-paced, flip-the-playbook mystery". Mark Sanderson writes in the Sunday Times, "Although this beautifully designed DIY manual is full of twists, the emphasis is on comedy." Syndicated critic Peter D. Kramer interviewed Holmes about his process in creating the world of McMasters, and compares the school to "a sort of Hogwarts for homicidalists".
