= Terminal (Rupert Holmes song) =

Single by Rupert Holmes

from the album Widescreen
- B-side: "Bagdad"
- Released: 1974
- Genre: Soft rock
- Length: 4:15
- Label: Epic
- Songwriter: Rupert Holmes

"Terminal" is a song by British-American singer-songwriter Rupert Holmes, released as a single in 1974. The song is included on his 1974 debut album, Widescreen on Epic Records. The orchestrations on the recording were written and conducted by Holmes. The album was produced by Jeffrey Lesser. "Terminal" was backed with "Bagdad", a track also from Widescreen. Some promotional copies were issued in a special sleeve (not actually a picture sleeve, but rather an art sleeve) describing the song. In 1975, after Holmes's self-titled second Epic album was released, Epic again issued "Terminal" as an A-side (Epic 50161), backed with "Deco Lady" from his second album. Neither single release charted.

"Terminal" is a popular song in the Philippines, and has subsequently been covered by Filipino singers Julius Obregon on the 1975 album A Friend to You, Sharon Cuneta on the 2006 album Isn't It Romantic?, and Piolo Pascual on the 2009 album Decades.

In Cuneta's version, its lyrics are delivered from a female point of view; the line "I had to get home to the kids and the wife" was changed to "I had to get back to the kids and my life".

== Content ==
A married family man "working for a computer" on Wall Street meets a woman at a bus terminal, and the two have a one-day fling in which he calls in sick from work. His lust for life awakened by the fling, he considers ending his current life and chasing her, but he decides against it and returns to his mundane life that afternoon.

Some time later, he returns to the terminal, reminiscing while realizing he will almost certainly never see her again and regretting his decision. He describes his transition back to normal life as a terminal illness, as if he is "living dead."

== Personnel ==
- Rupert Holmes - vocals, piano, orchestration, conductor
- Elliott Randall - acoustic guitar, electric guitar
- Jay Berliner - acoustic guitar
- Sal DeTroia - acoustic guitar, electric guitar
- Al Rogers - drums
- John Miller - electric bass
- Anahid Ajemian, Charles McCracker, David Nadien, Elliot Rosoff, Manny Green, Harry Lookofskey, Irving Spice, Israel Chorberg, John Palanchian, Joseph Malignaggi, Michael Comins, Paul Gershman, Bill Linnane, Ruth Buffington, Sidney Kaufman - violin
- Alan Schulman, George Koutzen, Harry Cykman, Jesse Levy, Maurice Bialkin, Sally Rosoff, Seymour Barab, Toby Saks - cello
