= Secondhand Lions: A New Musical =

Musical based on 2003 film Secondhand Lions

- Music: Alan Zachary and Michael Weiner
- Lyrics: Alan Zachary and Michael Weiner
- Book: Rupert Holmes
- Basis: 2003 film Secondhand Lions
- Premiere: September 6, 2013: Seattle, Washington
- Productions: The 5th Avenue Theatre

Secondhand Lions: A New Musical is based on the 2003 movie of the same name. Music and lyrics for the musical were written by Alan Zachary and Michael Weiner, who also wrote First Date. The book was by Rupert Holmes.

== Production ==
The show premiered from September 6 to October 7, 2013 at The 5th Avenue Theatre in Seattle, Washington.

The show was directed by Scott Schwartz, who directed Golda's Balcony and co-directed Jane Eyre on Broadway. Scott Schwartz was appointed Artistic Director of the Bay Street Theatre in Sag Harbor, New York in 2013.

== Plot ==
Walter, a young boy, is unwillingly dropped off unannounced, by his mother, Mae, at his two great-uncles' farmhouse in Texas for the summer. The uncles, Hub and Garth, recently bought the farm, returning after a long time with a secretly earned fortune. Over the course of the summer, Walter tries to find the method in which his uncles gained money, and what they did during their absence. The tale he hears and discovers reveals the uncles' courage and bravery in their prime.

Differences from the Film

- Jane, the girl across the pond, is an added character in the musical.
- The ‘relatives’ in the film that arrive to learn about the uncle's fortune are omitted in the musical.
- There are no live animals in the musical.
- Jasmine, in the movie, is renamed Samira.

== Musical numbers ==
Act 1

- Overture - Orchestra
- The Wild Lion Boys – Male Ensemble
- The Fort Worth College of Court Reporting – Mae
- Just Right – Walter
- Worth Believin’ In (Part 1)/The Steamship – Garth, Young Hub, Young Garth
- The Sultan of the Sultanate of Oujda – Fake Sultan, Ensemble
- Sand – Sultan, Harem Girls, Grand Vizier, Ensemble
- You Have to See It to Believe It – Jane, Walter
- You Have to See It to Believe It (Reprise) – Jane
- Mae's Letter – Mae
- Just What I Needed –Samira
- Unlike Anyone I’ve Ever Known – Young Hub, Sultan
- Ghita's Advice – Ghita, Samira, Harem Girls
- Hub's Revelation – Hub, Garth, Young Hub, Walter, Ensemble

Act 2

- Entracte – Orchestra
- Just What I Needed (Reprise) – Samira, Ghita, Harem Girls
- Alive or Dead – Sultan, Ensemble
- You Have Brought Me Love – Samira, Young Hub
- Fly into a Better Tomorrow – Walter, Jane, Garth, Ensemble
- The Sultan of the Sultanate of Oujda (Reprise) – Prisoners
- The Sultan's Lament – Sultan, Ensemble
- You Have Brought Me Love (Reprise) – Samira, Hub
- Worth Believin’ In (Part 2) – Hub
- The Wild Lion Boys (Reprise) – Stan
- Do Something for Me – Walter
- Don't Count Us Out – Garth, Hub, Walter
- Worth Believin’ In (Finale) - Company

== Roles and original cast ==
The principal cast of The 5th Avenue Theatre's production was as follows.

Character	Actor
Garth	Gregg Edelman
Hub	Mark Jacoby
Mae	Kendra Kassebaum
Walter	Johnny Rabe
Samira	Jenny Powers
Young Garth	Jared Michael Brown
Young Hub	Kevin Earley
Sultan	Jason Danieley
Achmed	Justin Huertas
Jane	Sophia Anne Caruso
Ghita	Wendi Bergamini
Ricky-Jo	Nick Gaswirth
Bruno	Harris Milgrim
Vic	Deon Ridley
Sicilian Hoodlum	Harris Milgrim
Barlow	Nick DeSantis
Stan	Matthew Posner
Nurse	Sarah Rose Davis
Grown Walter	Kevin Earley
Todd	Johnny Rabe
Grown Jane	Jenny Powers
Sultan's Grandson	Jason Danieley

† Grayson J. Smith appeared as Walter Double, before the song 'Just Right'.

== Recordings ==
The World Premiere Recording was released digitally on October 2, 2020 by Broadway Records. It includes a cut song entitled "The Fort Worth College of Court Reporting".
