= Forever More (Puff Johnson song) =

1996 single by Puff Johnson

Single by Puff Johnson

from the album Miracle
- Released: April 30, 1996
- Genre: Pop; R&B
- Length: 5:05
- Label: Work; Columbia
- Songwriters: Sally Jo Dakota; Puff Johnson; Narada Michael Walden
- Producer: Narada Michael Walden

Puff Johnson singles chronology
"Forever More" (1996)	"All Over Your Face" (1996)

Music video
- "Forever More" on YouTube

"Forever More" is a song by American singer Puff Johnson, released on April 30, 1996, by Work Group and Columbia Records as the first single from her only studio album, Miracle (1996). The ballad was written by Johnson along with Sally Jo Dakota and Narada Michael Walden, while production was helmed by the latter, with Louis Biancaniello credited as associate producer. Its accompanying music video was directed by Greg Masuak.

== Critical reception ==
Larry Flick from Billboard magazine remarked that Johnson "effortlessly glides through this pop-sweetened R&B ballad", produced "with recognizable flair" by Walden. He added, "The song itself is a tad predictable but pleasantly executed. It is easy to imagine love-struck young girls swaying and singing along to this." A reviewer from Music Week gave it a score of four out of five, writing, "Columbia's smooth soul diva follows up her huge 'Over & Over' with another seductive, Whitney-esque smoocher, which she penned with Narada Michael Walden and Jermaine Dupri. Radio will lap it up." The magazine's Alan Jones commented, "Puff Johnson is a fine vocalist, rather like Whitney Houston without the frills, and this image is even more strongly evoked by Puff's majestic new single 'Forever More', which was co-authored by Narada Michael Walden, architect of many of Whitney's early career triumphs. It is a sonically soothing and memorable R&B ballad, lovingly embraced by Puff's tender vocals. It's one of those records that could hang around for a long time."

== Chart performance ==
In the United States, "Forever More" peaked at number 63 on the Billboard Hot 100, number 31 on the Hot R&B Singles chart, and number 22 on the Top 40/Rhythm-Crossover chart. "Forever More" charted the highest in New Zealand, where it peaked at number five on the RIANZ Singles Chart. Elsewhere, the song became a top-30 hit in both Australia and the United Kingdom, peaking at number 29 in both countries. It also charted in the Netherlands, peaking at number 91.

== Music video ==
The music video for "Forever More" was directed by Greg Masuak. On his website, Masuak writes that the video was heavily edited to become a strictly African-American love story, although it was intended to be a multi-racial tribute to love. In parts of the music video, Puff is seeing playing with an elephant.

== Track listings ==
Australian CD single
No.	Title	Writer(s)	Producer(s)	Length
1.	"Forever More" (Single Version)	Puff Johnson; Sally Jo Dakota; Narada Michael Walden	Walden	4:07
2.	"Forever More" (Album Version)	Johnson; Dakota; Walden	Walden	5:08
3.	"I Like It"	Kipper Jones; Carsten Schack; Kenneth Karlin	Soulshock & Karlin	4:52
4.	"Never Loved Nobody"	Mike Mani; Sally Jo Dakota; Narada Michael Walden; Tracie Spencer	Walden; Louis Biancaniello^{[a]}	4:10

European CD single
No.	Title	Writer(s)	Producer(s)	Length
1.	"Forever More" (Radio Version)	Johnson; Dakota; Walden	Walden	4:07
2.	"Forever More" (Classic Mix)	Johnson; Dakota; Walden	Walden; Love to Infinity^{[b]}	7:09
3.	"Forever More" (Sandman Club Mix)	Johnson; Dakota; Walden	Walden; Love to Infinity^{[b]}	7:17
4.	"All Because of You"	Johnson; Jermaine Dupri; Carl Lowe; Lawrence Parker; Kenny Parker; Rodney LeMay; Hachidai Nakamura; Rokusuke Ei; Janice M. Johnson	Dupri; So-Lowe^{[c]}	3:31

European maxi-single
No.	Title	Writer(s)	Producer(s)	Length
1.	"Forever More" (Album Version)	Johnson; Dakota; Walden	Walden	5:07
2.	"Forever More" (Eyernity Mix)	Johnson; Dakota; Walden	Walden; Love to Infinity^{[b]}	6:11
3.	"Forever More" (Mystro's R & B Groove Mix)	Johnson; Dakota; Walden	Walden; Love to Infinity^{[b]}	4:25
4.	"Forever More" (Classic Mix)	Johnson; Dakota; Walden	Walden; Love to Infinity^{[b]}	7:07
5.	"Forever More" (Sandman Club Mix)	Johnson; Dakota; Walden	Walden; Love to Infinity^{[b]}	7:15

US single
No.	Title	Writer(s)	Producer(s)	Length
1.	"Forever More" (Single Version)	Johnson; Dakota; Walden	Walden	4:01
2.	"Forever More" (Album Version)	Johnson; Dakota; Walden	Walden	5:05

Notes

- ^{^a} denotes associate producer
- ^{^b} denotes additional producer
- ^{^c} denotes co-producer

== Credits and personnel ==
Credits are lifted from the liner notes of Miracle.

- Louis Biancaniello – associate production, instruments, programming
- David "Frazeman" Frazer – recording
- Jeff "G" Gray – assistant engineering
- Sandy Griffith – backing vocals
- Mick Guzauski – mixing
- Puff Johnson – backing vocals
- Janice Lee – coordination
- Cherise Miller – coordination
- Marc "Elvis" Reyburn – recording
- Claytoven Richardson – backing vocals
- Matt Rohr – additional recording
- Cynthia Shiloh – coordination
- Annie Stocking – backing vocals
- Kulan Kevin Walden – coordination
- Narada Michael Walden – arrangement, production

== Charts ==
=== Weekly charts ===
Chart (1996)	Peak position
Australia (ARIA)	29
Netherlands (Single Top 100)	91
New Zealand (Recorded Music NZ)	5
Scotland Singles (OCC)	51
UK Singles (OCC)	29
UK Hip Hop/R&B (OCC)	8
US Billboard Hot 100	63
US Hot R&B Singles (Billboard)	31
US Top 40/Rhythm-Crossover (Billboard)	22

=== Year-end charts ===
Chart (1996)	Position
New Zealand (RIANZ)	41
US Top 40/Rhythm-Crossover (Billboard)	91

== Release history ==
Region	Date	Format(s)	Label(s)	Ref.
United States	April 9, 1996	Rhythmic contemporary radio	Work	
United States	April 30, 1996	CD	Work	
United States	May 7, 1996	Contemporary hit radio	Work	
Japan	June 21, 1996	Mini-CD	Sony	
United Kingdom	March 31, 1997	CD; cassette	Columbia	
