= The Buoys (American band) =

Early 1970s American pop/rock band

For the alternative rock band formed in 2016, see The Buoys (Australian band).

The Buoys were an American pop/rock band from the early 1970s. Its membership included Bill Kelly, Fran Brozena, Jerry Hludzik, Carl Siracuse and Chris Hanlon, based in the Wilkes-Barre-Scranton, Pennsylvania, area. In the U.S., they were most famous for the banned song "Timothy"; in Europe, their song "Give Up Your Guns" was twice a massive hit. Both songs were written by Rupert Holmes, the latter together with D. Jordan.

== Partnership with Rupert Holmes ==
The Buoys are best known for their recording of Rupert Holmes's "Timothy", a song deliberately written to get banned, based on the theme of cannibalism. Holmes himself selected the group to record the song.

Recorded at Scepter Recording Studios in New York City and released by Scepter Records in December 1970, with whom the Buoys had been signed but previously ignored, the song hit No. 17 on US charts in 1971.

In 1963, there had been a mine cave-in in Sheppton, Pennsylvania, a small mining community outside of Hazleton, Pennsylvania. Rupert Holmes told rock journalist Maxim Furek, "I learned about the Sheppton Mine Disaster after Timothy was on the charts. If I had known about that at the time, I probably never would have written the song because I don’t want to make fun of something that’s tragic."

Scepter executives did not catch what the song was about until after it started climbing the charts, after which they claimed that Timothy was a mule. Holmes rejected this attempt to change the premise of his song; he had intended it to be offensive. Holmes, with D. Jordan, wrote the song "Give Up Your Guns" (1972), an epic narrative dealing with an escaped bank robber. Much more serious in tone than their previous hit, "Give Up Your Guns" reached only No. 84 in the U.S. By contrast, "Give Up Your Guns" was a massive hit twice in mainland Europe, when originally released, and when re-released in 1979.

Holmes wrote a number of other songs for the band, including "The Prince of Thieves", "Bloodknot", and "Tomorrow", most of which had much of the darkness but little of the humor of "Timothy". Like "Give Up Your Guns", they are complaints by criminals.

Holmes later would write Broadway musicals. Rock journalist Maxim Furek wrote a book connecting Sheppton to what he called The Sheppton Mythology.

== Additional songs ==
Their other songs, written by the band without Holmes, include the following:

- "Sunny Days/Memories"
- "Tell Me Heaven Is Here"
- "Castles"
- "Streams Together"
- "Good Lovin'"
- "Pittsburgh Steel"
- "Absent Friend"
- "Sunny Days"
- "Look Back America"
- "Liza's Last Ride"

In addition, the songs "Don't Try to Run" and "Dreams" were written by Brozena, Kelly, and Hludzik only.

== History ==
The Buoys combined CSN-style harmonies blended with assorted musical approaches. Their eclectic style combined piano as a major instrument, with guitar, drums, strings, winds, brass, and harp, but also borrowed from the 1950s rock 'n' roll sound ("Good Lovin'", "Sunny Days") to more 1960s-influenced songs of protest ("Look Back America", "Pittsburgh Steel"), 1930s-style pop like "These Days", to Renaissance-influenced prog like "Castles". Without Holmes, the darker lyrical aspects largely went away, although "Pittsburgh Steel" contains more dark humor; Pittsburgh steelworkers plot to kill their foreman by dumping him in a vat of ore.

After The Buoys broke up, Bill Kelly and Jerry Hludzik teamed up as The Jerry-Kelly Band. In 1980, they formed a band called Dakota. Dakota joined a sold-out tour as the opening act for Queen. The tour included Baton Rouge, Montreal, Toronto, Philadelphia, Houston and Atlanta. Danny Seraphine of Chicago produced several albums for Dakota. Dakota disbanded in 1987, and reformed again in the 1990s with several new members, playing folk- and country-influenced rock.

Post-Dakota, Kelly and Hludzik regrouped several times as The Buoys, but with a different lineup of musicians. Bill Kelly relocated to Nashville, Tennessee, where he operated Sweet Suite Music in Old Hickory before his death December 13, 2024, at age 74. Hludzik lived in Philadelphia and West Chester, Pennsylvania. He died on April 12, 2020, in Christiana, Pennsylvania, after a long struggle with frontotemporal dementia.

In 2023, the Buoys were inducted into the Luzerne County Arts & Entertainment Hall of Fame. They were among the inaugural class of inductees.

== Collections ==
An album on compact disc of eighteen of The Buoys' songs was released in 1993 by Movieplay S.A., Intermusic, Inc., and Remember Records, in some markets as Give Up Your Guns and in others as Timothy: Golden Classics. Both albums contained the same cover image: a vintage photograph by Michael Ochs of the five core band members standing before the entrance of a building, under an awning that says "Timothy". On the right, "Give Up Your Guns" is spraypainted on the wall of the building.

This collection includes most of their pressed recordings, although an alternate B-side take of "Liza's Last Ride" did not make it on. According to Rupert Holmes's webmaster, this pressing is unauthorized, and neither Holmes nor The Buoys receive any royalties from its sales.

== Discography ==
=== Albums ===
Title	Album details
The Buoys	Released: 1971 (US); Label: Scepter Records; Formats: CD, LP, digital download

=== Compilations ===
Title	Album details
Give Up Your Guns - 18 Great Songs	Released: 1993 (US); Label: Gusto Records; Formats: CD, LP, digital download
Gusto's Top Hits: Give Up Your Guns	Released: February 25, 2009 (US); Label: Gusto Records; Formats: CD, LP, digital download

=== Singles ===
Year	Single	Peak chart positions			Album
Year	Single	US	CAN	NLD	Album
1969	"These Days"	—	—	—	Give Up Your Guns - 18 Great Songs
1970	"Timothy"	17	9	—	The Buoys
1971	"Bloodknot"	—	—	—	The Buoys
1972	"Give Up Your Guns"	84	—	5	The Buoys
