= Swango (musical) =

Dance revue by Mariela Franganillo and Robert Royston, with a script by Rupert Holmes

Swango is a dance revue conceived and choreographed by Mariela Franganillo and Robert Royston, with a script by Rupert Holmes and a potpourri of tango and swing music.

The original production played in the off-Broadway Swing 46 jazz club in 2002 and moved to the Helen Hayes Theater in Nyack, New York, in 2003. It received mixed reviews. In both productions, Franganillo and Royston played the lovers. It played at theatres in White Plains, New York and Queens, New York in 2005.

== Plot ==
A Romeo and Juliet-type story loosely based on the 1957 play West Side Story: a girl from the Argentine Tango world meets a boy from the West Coast Swing crew. A bartender narrates the conflict as the two groups compete to take over a new dance club in a converted warehouse. When the lovers come together, they create the fusion of Tango and Swing suggested by the title.
