= New York Beacon =

Weekly newspaper in New York City

The New York Beacon is an African-American newspaper in New York City.

In 1981, Big Red News, a weekly newspaper in New York City, was bought by Walter "Ball" Smith. He later changed the name of the paper to New York Beacon with the mission of delivering news to the African-American community there. "Showing the Way to Truth and Justice" soon became the slogan of the newspaper.

Its first issue as the New York Beacon was in 1993.

Although the New York Beacon displayed Walter "Ball" Smith's personal perspective, where he led for 26 years as CEO, the newspaper boasted of the diversity of many editorialists over the years.

The New York Beacon is a part of a larger network of African-American newspapers known as the National Newspaper Publishers Association.
