= Escape (The Piña Colada Song) =

1979 single by Rupert Holmes

- Standard picture sleeve

Single by Rupert Holmes

from the album Partners in Crime
- B-side: "Drop It"
- Released: September 17, 1979
- Recorded: 1979
- Genre: Soft rock; yacht rock
- Length: 4:36 (album version); 3:50 (single version)
- Label: Infinity
- Songwriter: Rupert Holmes
- Producers: Rupert Holmes; Jim Boyer

Rupert Holmes singles chronology
"Let's Get Crazy Tonight" (1978)	"Escape (The Piña Colada Song)" (1979)	"Him" (1980)

"Escape (The Piña Colada Song)" is a song written and performed by British-born American singer-songwriter Rupert Holmes taken from his fifth studio album Partners in Crime (1979). As the lead single for the album, the pop song was recommended by Billboard for radio broadcasters on September 29, 1979, then added to prominent US radio playlists during October–November. Rising in popularity, the song peaked at the end of December to become the final US number-one song of the 1970s.

== Content ==
The song follows a three-act narrative with three verses and choruses.

It is told from the perspective of a man bored with his partner. While she sleeps, he reads the personals column in the newspaper and sees an ad from a woman seeking a carefree man who, among other things, enjoys piña coladas. Planning to cheat on his partner, he replies and arranges a secret meeting—only to discover the woman is his current partner, who had also planned to cheat on him. The song's narrative puts a positive spin on this encounter, where the man realizes that they had more in common than they thought, and that all they needed was already in front of them.

== Background and writing ==
Initially, the chorus started with the line "If you like Humphrey Bogart", which Holmes changed at the last minute, replacing the actor with the name of the first exotic cocktail that came to mind and fit the music.

As I was getting on mic I thought to myself, I've done so many movie references to Bogart and wide-screen cinema on my earlier albums, maybe I shouldn't do one here.

I thought, What can I substitute? Well, this woman wants an escape, like she wants to go on vacation to the islands. When you go on vacation to the islands, when you sit on the beach and someone asks you if you'd like a drink, you never order a Budweiser, you don't have a beer. You're on vacation, you want a drink in a hollowed-out pineapple with the flags of all nations and a parasol. If the drink is blue you'd be very happy. And a long straw. I thought, What are those escape drinks? Let's see, there's daiquiri, mai tai, piña colada... I wonder what a piña colada tastes like? I've never even had one.

I thought that instead of singing, "If you like Humphrey Bogart," with the emphasis on like, I could start it a syllable earlier and go, "If you like piña-a coladas."

— Rupert Holmes

Holmes said in 2019 that he still does not drink piña coladas.

== Reception and legacy ==
The song shot up through the US charts, becoming the country's last number-one Billboard Hot 100 hit of 1979 and of the 1970s. "Escape" was knocked out of the top spot but returned to number one on the Billboard Hot 100 chart during the second week of 1980, having been displaced for a week by KC and the Sunshine Band's "Please Don't Go". It is the first pop song to ascend to No. 1 on the Billboard pop chart in two different decades. The song was the 11th best-selling single of 1980 on the U.S. Billboard Hot 100.

The song was covered by Jack Johnson for the 2013 adaptation of The Secret Life of Walter Mitty.

In a 2016 episode of the TV show Better Call Saul, the show's protagonist, Jimmy McGill (a.k.a. Saul Goodman), while filming an ad for his fledgling legal practice, claims he is making a documentary about Rupert Holmes and sings part of "Escape".

The Goldbergs' "The Piña Colada Episode" in 2019 is based on an incident that Adam F. Goldberg said really happened to his family. Goldberg said his family had to listen to "Escape" over and over when a cassette tape got stuck in the car's tape deck.

== Credits and personnel ==
- Rupert Holmes – vocals, acoustic piano, electric piano, Oberheim polyphonic
- Dean Bailin – electric guitar
- Frank Gravis – bass
- Leo Adamian – drums
- Steve Jordan – "double drumming" with Adamian

== Charts ==
=== Weekly charts ===
Weekly chart performance for "Escape (The Piña Colada Song)"
Chart (1979–1980)	Peak position
Australia (Kent Music Report)	3
Belgium (VRT Top 30 Flanders)	10
Canada (RPM) Top Singles	1
Canada Adult Contemporary (RPM)	13
Ireland (IRMA)	10
Netherlands (Dutch Top 40)	13
New Zealand (Recorded Music NZ)	4
South Africa (Springbok)	11
UK Singles (Official Charts)	23
US Billboard Hot 100	1

=== Year-end charts ===
1979 chart performance for "Escape (The Piña Colada Song)"
Chart (1979)	Position
Canada	156

1980 chart performance for "Escape (The Piña Colada Song)"
Chart (1980)	Position
Australia (Kent Music Report)	47
Canada	19
US Billboard Hot 100	11

== Certifications ==
Certifications for "Escape (The Piña Colada Song)"
Region	Certification	Certified units/sales
Canada (Music Canada)	Gold	75,000^{^}
Germany (BVMI)	Gold	250,000^{‡}
New Zealand (RMNZ)	4× Platinum	120,000^{‡}
United Kingdom (BPI)	Platinum	600,000^{‡}
United States (RIAA)	Gold	1,000,000^{^}
^{^} Shipments figures based on certification alone.^{‡} Sales+streaming figures based on certification alone.

== See also ==
- List of Billboard Hot 100 number ones of 1979
- List of Billboard Hot 100 number ones of 1980
