= Puff Johnson =

American singer-songwriter (1972–2013)

- Born: Ewanya Johnson; December 10, 1972; Detroit, Michigan, U.S.
- Died: June 24, 2013 (aged 40)
- Genres: R&B, CCM
- Occupations: Singer, songwriter
- Years active: 1983–2013
- Labels: Motown, Work

Ewanya "Puff" Johnson (December 10, 1972 – June 24, 2013) was an American R&B singer-songwriter. Born in Detroit, she emerged on the music scene with her singles "Forever More" and "Over and Over", which experienced commercial success in Europe and Australia. These songs were included on her only album Miracle (1996). In the early- to mid-2000s, she was listed as a co-writer on several projects and relocated to South Africa where she began working on an unreleased second album. In March 2008 Johnson was diagnosed with cervical cancer and subsequently, five years later on June 24, 2013, died of the disease.

== Early life ==
Johnson, the daughter of Mack Johnson Jr. and wife Marie, was born on December 10, 1972, in Detroit, Michigan, and raised in Los Angeles, California. A singer and dancer with formal voice training, she attended High School for the Performing Arts at California State University. At age 13, Johnson signed her first recording deal with Motown Records, but eventually decided against recording at the time because of the commitment involved. Three years later, she became an assistant choreographer after working on the music video for the New Kids on the Block song "Step by Step" and was hired as a background vocalist for Christopher Williams and R&B trio The Good Girls.

== Career ==
In 1994, Johnson performed the song "What Child Is This" on the Christmas compilation Joyful Christmas, followed by the Donny Hathaway cover "Someday We'll All Be Free" which appeared on soundtrack for The Promised Land. In 1995, she appeared on rapper Tupac Shakur's song "Me Against the World", which was featured on the Bad Boys movie soundtrack and appeared on his album Me Against the World. A year later, she signed with Work Group and intensified work on her debut album Miracle (1996). The album was preceded by first single "Forever More", produced by Narada Michael Walden, which achieved its biggest success in New Zealand where it reached number five on the charts. Another single, "Over and Over", appeared on the soundtrack of the comedy film The First Wives Club (1996) and became a hit in Europe and Australia, particularly in Norway and United Kingdom, where it entered the top ten and the top 20, respectively. Miracle, executive produced by Randy Jackson, peaked at number seven on the Norwegian Albums Chart and entered the top thirty in the Netherlands.

In 1997, Johnson toured Europe as an opening act for Michael Jackson and 3T. She did not release any further material and slipped out of the limelight. However, in the early- to mid-‘00s, she was listed as a co-writer on several projects, including Pam & Dodi's self-titled Geffen Records debut, rapper I-20's debut studio album Self Explanatory (2004) and three tracks on singer Leela James's debut album A Change Is Gonna Come. Following a concert in Johannesburg, Johnson lived in South Africa beginning in January 2009. There, she began work on her second album with local label Ghetto Ruff Records owner Lance Stehr, with whom she finished several songs before moving to Limpopo to work with a controversial former attorney Tumi Mokwena, who worked with Johnson at his stable TMP Records.

== Personal life ==
Johnson was engaged to music producer Alarza Lee "Kip" Collins Jr., who died in a motorcycle crash in 2006. She was later involved with singer Ishmael Morabe, who she met in a studio in South Africa. They dated for almost two years in South Africa, before she had to leave South Africa due to her visa not having proper documentation. They continued a long-distance relationship following her departure.

Johnson was diagnosed with cervical cancer in March 2008. She died of the disease on June 24, 2013, aged 40 years old.

== Discography ==
=== Studio albums ===
Title	Album details	Peak positions			
Title	Album details	US R&B	AUS	NLD	NOR
Miracle	Released: May 28, 1996; Label: Work; Formats: CD, cassette	61	51	28	7

=== Singles ===
List of singles, with selected chart positions and certifications, showing year released and album name
Title	Year	Peak chart positions						Album
Title	Year	US	US R&B	AUS	NLD	NOR	UK	Album
"Forever More"	1996	63	31	29	91	—	29	Miracle
"All Over Your Face"	1996	—	57	—	—	—	—	Miracle
"Over and Over"	1996	118	114	29	20	10	20	The First Wives Club: Music from the Motion Picture... And Then Some
