= Him (Rupert Holmes song) =

1980 single by Rupert Holmes

- German release cover

Single by Rupert Holmes

from the album Partners in Crime
- B-side: "Get Outta Yourself"
- Released: 7 January 1980
- Recorded: 1979
- Genre: Soft rock
- Length: 4:06 (LP version/UK single version/Canadian French single version); 3:34 (7" version/US & Canada single version)
- Label: MCA
- Songwriter: Rupert Holmes
- Producers: Rupert Holmes, Jim Boyer

Rupert Holmes singles chronology
"Escape (The Piña Colada Song)" (1979)	"Him" (1980)	"Answering Machine" (1980)

Alternative release
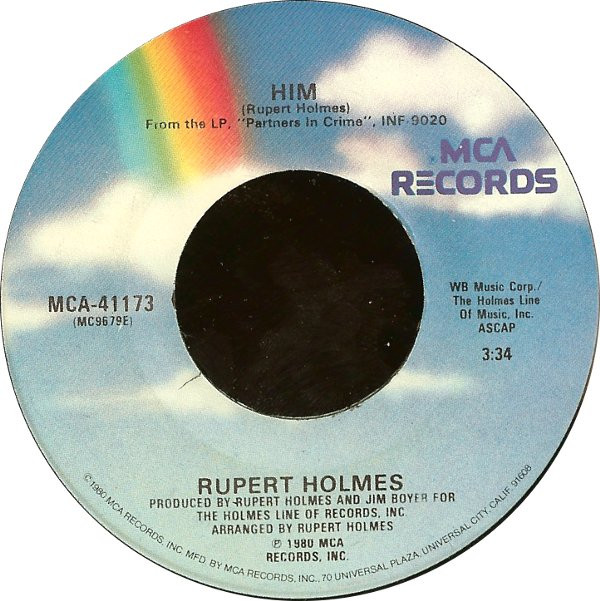
- Side A of the US single

"Him" is a song written and recorded by American singer and songwriter Rupert Holmes. It was released in January 1980 as the second single from the album, Partners in Crime.

The song peaked at number six on the US Billboard Hot 100 on March 29, 1980 and remained at that position for two weeks. It was Holmes' biggest Adult Contemporary hit, peaking at number four in both the United States and Canada.

== Background ==
Holmes had always expected "Him" to be the lead-off single to Partners in Crime, but after record executives heard the album, they concluded that "Escape (The Piña Colada Song)", a song Holmes composed mainly as album filler and never expected to be a single, would be a major hit. After "Escape" proved to be a major hit, "Him" was released as a follow-up and itself became a hit.

The song is sung from the point of view of a man who, when he discovers a pack of cigarettes that do not belong to him, suspects that the woman in his life is cheating on him. He has no idea who this other man may be, but he decides he must confront her; he expects her to say that the other man is "just a friend", and plans to tell her bluntly, "It's me or it's him."

The midsection of this song features the melodic wordless sunshine pop chorale singing over the instrumental break that is reminiscent of The Beach Boys and The Association during the first half of the 3rd verse before jumping into "If she wants him, she can have him" in the second half.

== Critical reception ==
Billboard said that "Him" was a "tale of love and woe strengthened by Holmes' smooth vocal delivery and emphasis on lyric." Cashbox felt that the song dealt with similar subject matter to his previous single, "Escape (The Piña Colada Song)". They found the hook for "Him" to be "incredibly infectious" and said that the vocal melody was "original enough" to become another top 40 hit for Holmes. Record World thought that the song was "another acute of adult relationships" predicted that the song would perform well on multiple radio formats. Record Mirror characterized the song as "a slice of thoughtful Fab 40 love-gone-wrong balladeering."

== Other versions ==
In 1980, Holmes re-recorded the song in French under the title "Lui" (MCA 41252) that was backed with an instrumental version of "Guitars" (his previous album had included an English vocal version of the song). The single was released only in Canada by MCA Records Canada. This French version of "Him" ("Lui") has never been released on any vinyl or CD album.

Also, Mexican singer Jose Jose covered the song in Spanish language and was titled "Él", from his 1980 album Amor, Amor.

British singer Simone Kelsall (who recorded under the name 'Simone') released a version of the song in 1984 on Electricity Records in the UK.

== Personnel ==
- Rupert Holmes – vocals, keyboards, synthesizer
- Dean Bailin – guitar
- Frank Gravis – bass
- Leo Adamian – drums
- Victoria – percussion
- Gene Orloff Section – strings

== Chart performance ==
=== Weekly charts ===
Chart (1980)	Peak position
Australian (Kent Music Report)	42
Belgium (VRT Top 30 Flanders)	11
Canada (RPM) Top Singles	14
Canada Adult Contemporary (RPM)	4
Germany (Media Control Charts)	32
Netherlands (Dutch Top 40)	18
New Zealand (RIANZ)	8
UK Singles (Official Charts Company)	31
US Billboard Hot 100	6
US Billboard Adult Contemporary	4

=== Year-end charts ===
Chart (1980)	Rank
Canada	100
US Billboard Hot 100	50
