= Double drumming =

Style of drumming developed in the 20th century

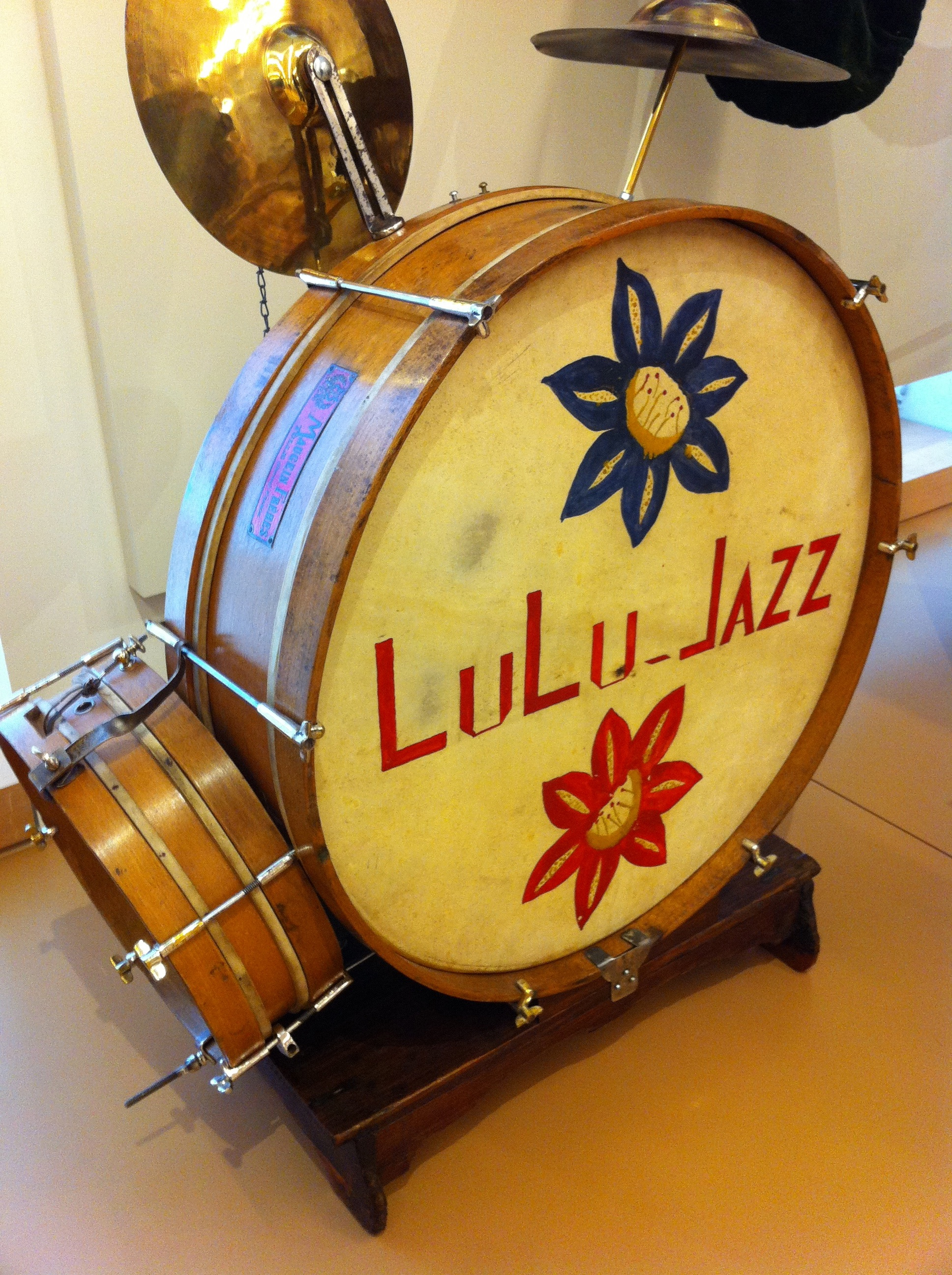
Lulu Jazz Drum

Double drumming is a percussion technique, developed around 1900, allowing the use of both a bass and snare drum by one person, using drum sticks, prior to the invention of the bass drum pedal (in 1909) and leading to the availability of the drum kit. According to Len 'Hunt' Doc, double drumming allowed one player to "beat a fast four-in-a-bar bass drum, doing a close roll on snare at the same time," whereas before it would have taken two percussionists. Accomplished through close positioning of the bass and snare heads, the cymbals were played by tapping a foot pedal called a "low-boy". This style is best exemplified by early New Orleans Jazz/Second Line bands, and Baby Dodds has been called the master.

It has been proposed that either the bass foot pedal or hi-hat pedal was invented, or rather, standardized, first. The illustration in Blades and Dean (2002) implies that the low-boy started out as a stick laid over two cymbals ("sock cymbal") and that the positioning of the snare and bass was facing each other, nearly touching at the bottom, achieved through use of snare and bass drum stands, while Nicholls describes the snare drum as being, "tilted alarmingly close to vertical." Hessler and Famularo (2008) argue that the bass drum pedal must have come first, due to its less sensitive action.

This process also contributed to the standard drum kit layout and arm position, as most drummers chose to play the bass pedal with their right foot. When the hi-hat came along, it was left to the other foot, and traditional grip made the use of the right hand, and thus a cross-, rather than open-, handed technique, more comfortable.

== See also ==
- Double bass drum
