= Olivia Goldsmith =

American novelist (1949–2004)

- Born: Randy Goldfield; January 1, 1949; Dumont, New Jersey
- Died: January 15, 2004 (aged 55); New York City, New York, U.S.
- Occupation: Novelist
- Spouse: John T. Reid (m. 1978; div. 1990) (Note: Some sources claim Olivia Goldsmith and John T. Reid were never legally wed.)
- Writing career
- Pen name: Justine Goldfield; Justine Rendal
- Period: 1992–2004
- Genre: Comedy

Olivia Goldsmith (January 1, 1949 – January 15, 2004) was an American author, known for her first novel The First Wives Club (1992), which was adapted into the 1996 film of the same name.

== Biography ==
She was born Randy Goldfield and grew up in Dumont, New Jersey, but changed her name to Justine Goldfield and later to Justine Rendal. She took up writing following a divorce in which she said her husband got almost everything (including her Jaguar and the country house).

A graduate of New York University, she was a partner at the management consultants Booz Allen Hamilton in New York prior to becoming a writer. Controversially, in late 1996 Goldsmith said, in response to an Entertainment Weekly reporter's question, that her favorite event of 1996 was when Bob Dole fell off a stage during a campaign function. She also wrote several books for children, which were published under the name Justine Rendal.

== Death ==
Goldsmith died as a result of complications (heart attack) from cosmetic surgery. Her final two books were published posthumously. The song "Edith Wharton's Figurines" from Suzanne Vega's 2007 studio album Beauty & Crime is dedicated to Goldsmith.

== Bibliography ==
- The First Wives Club (1992), adapted into the film of the same name starring Diane Keaton, Bette Midler and Goldie Hawn in 1996. The story deals with three friends who have been left by their husbands for younger women. After a friend (also a "first wife") kills herself due to her ex-husband's abuse, they decided to exact revenge on all four ex-husbands.
- Fashionably Late (1993) in which a young designer tries to handle her fashion house while dealing with her troubled marriage, adopting a child, and finding her birth mother.
- Flavor of the Month (1994), a satire of Hollywood following three stars of a hit TV show. One is a talented but plain actress who gets plastic surgery to look younger and beautiful; the second is a dirt-poor Southern girl fleeing an abusive father; the third is the spoiled child of actors.
- Marrying Mom (1996), in which three thirty-something New Yorkers try to get a husband for their widowed mother so she'll stop interfering in their lives.
- The Bestseller (1996), tracking five people with novels as they adjust to the publishing game and try to see their books succeed.
- Switcheroo (1998), where a wife discovers that her husband is having an affair. When she meets the mistress, they're stunned to realize that, but for a twenty-year age gap, they look exactly alike. With makeup and surgery, they switch places to try and teach him a lesson.
- She Stoops to Conquer (1999) libretto for an opera by composer Marjorie Rusche (with Andrew Joffe).
- Young Wives (2000), a sort of flip side of The First Wives Club where three twenty-something women discover their husbands are up to no good, from affairs to drug-dealing, and band together to get payback.
- Bad Boy (2001) in which a trendy Seattle reporter does an 'extreme-makeover' job on her best friend – a nerdy male computer programmer – to transform him 'from zero to hero.'
- Insiders (2002), smart and sassy Wall Street tycoon, Jennifer, agrees to take the rap for her boss' shady dealings. But after her fiancé lawyer fails to get her off the hook, Jennifer ends up in a harsh women's prison where her designer clothes and education count for nothing. On the inside, Jennifer discovers that working together, with unlikely partners in crime, is the only way out.
- Dumping Billy (2004), in which a woman notices that every time a woman is dumped by "Billy" she marries the next guy she meets. She thus attempts to set up a friend with him, hoping she'll be next after the breakup. Also released as "Uptown Girl".
- Wish Upon a Star (2004), a low-level secretary is invited to go to London with one of her firm's top partners, only to be cheated upon by him there, forcing herself to carve a new life for herself in a strange city.
