= Over and Over (Puff Johnson song) =

1996 single by Puff Johnson

Single by Puff Johnson

from the album Miracle
- Released: September 10, 1996
- Genre: Pop; R&B
- Length: 3:58
- Label: Work; Columbia
- Songwriters: Phil Galdston; Reed Vertelney; Alan Roy Scott
- Producer: Keith Thomas

Puff Johnson singles chronology
"All Over Your Face" (1997)	"Over and Over" (1996)

"Over and Over" is a song by American singer Puff Johnson. It was written by Phil Galdston, Reed Vertelney, and Alan Roy Scott and initially recorded for the soundtrack of the American comedy film The First Wives Club (1996). Production on the song was overseen by Keith Thomas. Released as a standalone single, it became a top-10 success in Norway and entered the top 20 of the UK Singles Chart. "Over and Over" was also included in several international editions of Johnson's only studio album, Miracle (1996).

== Critical reception ==
A reviewer from Music Week gave the song a score of four out of five, adding that "Columbia's push for the massive First Wives Club movie soundtrack guarantees major exposure for this potent mid-tempo R&B-styled pop song." In 1997, the magazine's Alan Jones wrote, "One of the most promising new R&B vocalists to emerge in 1996, Puff Johnson looks set for an early '97 hit with Over & Over. A true diva, Johnson's original version oozes class, but in order to make its passage to the UK chart smoother it has been given a fairly muscular house remix by Love To Infinity."

== Track listings ==
Maxi single
No.	Title	Writer(s)	Producer(s)	Length
1.	"Over and Over" (LP Version)	Phil Galdston; Reed Vertelney; Alan Roy Scott	Thomas	3:58
2.	"Over and Over" (Bonzai Original)	Galdston; Vertelney; Scott	Thomas; Jim "Bonzai" Caruso^{[a]}	4:41
3.	"Over and Over" (Power Pop Mix)	Galdston; Vertelney; Scott	Thomas; Jim "Bonzai" Caruso^{[a]}	4:32
4.	"God Sent You"	Puff Johnson; Sally Jo Dakota; Narada Michael Walden; Randy Jackson	Walden	5:03

CD single
No.	Title	Writer(s)	Producer(s)	Length
1.	"Over and Over" (LP Version)	Galdston; Vertelney; Scott	Thomas	3:58
2.	"All That's On My Mind"	Kipper Jones; Carsten Schack; Kenneth Karlin	Soulshock & Karlin	3:41
3.	"Baby Can You Feel It"	Johnson; Kenny Smooth; Darren Whittington	Smooth	3:12

Notes

- ^{^a} denotes additional producer

== Personnel ==
Personnel are lifted from the liner notes of Miracle.

- Phil Galdston – writing
- Puff Johnson – vocals
- Alan Roy Scott – writing
- Keith Thomas – arrangement, production
- Reed Vertelney – writing

== Charts ==
Chart (1996–1997)	Peak position
Australia (ARIA)	29
Europe (Eurochart Hot 100)	74
Germany (GfK)	93
Netherlands (Dutch Top 40)	20
Netherlands (Single Top 100)	24
Norway (VG-lista)	10
Scotland Singles (OCC)	20
UK Singles (OCC)	20
UK Hip Hop/R&B (OCC)	5
UK Pop Tip Club Chart (Music Week)	13

== Release history ==
Region	Date	Format(s)	Label(s)	Ref.
United States	September 10, 1996	Rhythmic contemporary; contemporary hit radio	Work	
Japan	October 21, 1996	Mini-CD	Sony	
United Kingdom	January 6, 1997	CD; cassette	Columbia	
