= The First Wives Club =

1996 film by Hugh Wilson

- Theatrical release poster
- Directed by: Hugh Wilson
- Screenplay by: Robert Harling
- Based on: The First Wives Club by Olivia Goldsmith
- Produced by: Scott Rudin
- Starring: Bette Midler; Goldie Hawn; Diane Keaton; Maggie Smith; Dan Hedaya; Bronson Pinchot; Marcia Gay Harden
- Cinematography: Donald Thorin
- Edited by: John Bloom
- Music by: Marc Shaiman
- Production company: Scott Rudin Productions
- Distributed by: Paramount Pictures
- Release date: September 20, 1996 (United States)
- Running time: 103 minutes
- Country: United States
- Language: English
- Budget: $26 million
- Box office: $181 million

The First Wives Club is a 1996 American comedy film directed by Hugh Wilson, based on the 1992 novel of the same name by Olivia Goldsmith. Bette Midler, Goldie Hawn, and Diane Keaton star as three divorcées who seek retribution on their ex-husbands for having left them for younger women. The supporting cast consists of Stockard Channing as the trio's friend Cynthia; Dan Hedaya, Victor Garber, and Stephen Collins as the three leads' ex-husbands; and Sarah Jessica Parker, Elizabeth Berkley, and Marcia Gay Harden as their respective lovers. Supporting roles are played by Maggie Smith, Bronson Pinchot, Eileen Heckart, Philip Bosco, Jennifer Dundas, and Timothy Olyphant in his feature film debut; cameo appearances include Gloria Steinem, Ed Koch, Kathie Lee Gifford, Rob Reiner, Lea DeLaria, and Ivana Trump.

Released by Paramount Pictures on September 20, 1996, the film became a surprise box-office success following its North American release, eventually grossing $181 million worldwide, mostly from its domestic run, despite receiving mixed reviews. It developed a cult following particularly among middle-aged women and the gay community, and as the actresses' highest-grossing project of the decade, it helped revitalize their careers in film and television. Composer Marc Shaiman was nominated for an Academy Award for Best Original Music Score, while Hawn was awarded a Blockbuster Entertainment Award and both Midler and Parker received Satellite Award nominations for their portrayals.

== Plot ==
In 1969, to celebrate their graduation from Middlebury College, Cynthia Swann gives her friends Annie MacDuggan, Brenda Morelli, and Elise Eliot matching pearl necklaces as parting gifts and makes them promise to always stay connected with each other. In the present day, the quartet have lost touch. Cynthia's ex-husband Gil Griffin, whose wealth originated from her family connections, has recently married his much younger mistress Mary Birmingham. She gives her housekeeper Teresa her pearl necklace and mails letters to her three former friends before committing suicide by jumping off the balcony of her penthouse apartment.

Reuniting at Cynthia's funeral in New York City, the surviving trio realize their current predicaments mirror Cynthia's. Annie is separated from her advertising executive husband, Aaron Paradis, and suffering from low self-esteem; Elise, an Oscar-winning actress, is struggling with alcoholism, her fading beauty and career, and a pending divorce from film producer Bill Atchison, who is now involved with young aspiring actress Phoebe LaVelle. Meanwhile, Brenda faces financial troubles after divorcing her husband Morty Cushman, who runs a successful chain of electronics stores.

Annie is stunned when Aaron admits he has been dating their mutual therapist Leslie Rosen. Elise attempts to revive her career by taking on a new female leading role. However, she is instead cast as the lead character Monique's unattractive mother, while Phoebe will be portraying Monique. Brenda encounters Morty's young and beautiful girlfriend, Shelly Stewart, who disparages Brenda's weight. Internalizing Cynthia's letters, the three women, having been instrumental in their husbands's individual successes, decide to pursue "justice" over revenge by forming the "First Wives Club", using a property of Elise as their base.

Chris, Annie's daughter, gets a job at Aaron's advertising agency. Covertly monitoring him, she discovers that Aaron's partners want to sell their share of the agency, but Annie lacks the funds to buy them. Concurrently, Elise forcefully repossesses numerous pieces of artwork and furniture that she bought Bill. She then secretly sells them for one dollar to Annie, who auctions them off at Christie's. At the auction, Brenda’s boss Duarto Feliz and Elise's oft-married prominent socialite friend Gunilla Garson Goldberg goad Shelly into spending most of Morty's fortune, allowing Annie to buy out Aaron's partners. Brenda discovers from her Sicilian paternal uncle Carmine that he and her father helped Morty establish his first store by selling stolen merchandise and that Morty's financial records have been fabricated. Aided by Gunilla and Duarte, the three women manipulate Shelly and Morty into vacating their home. The trio then furtively obtain the fraudulent records.

While the three initially rejoice over the victories, Elise becomes increasingly discouraged at being unable to find any evidence against Bill. After a vicious fight among the women, Annie quits the club. Elise and Brenda reconcile and convince Annie to rejoin, now looking beyond simply "justice" for themselves. Elise also reveals that she has decided to focus on bonding with Phoebe rather than on her relationship with Bill himself, exploiting Phoebe's starstruck attitude towards her regarding their upcoming film.

Brenda and Carmine abduct Morty, threatening to expose his fraud unless he relinquishes his business to her. Annie signs off on buying out Aaron's former business partners' share and taunts him, revealing that she has landed a new, lucrative $45 million account (implied to be Morty's electronics business, controlled by Brenda), thus nullifying his role in their business. Confronting Bill, Elise reveals that Phoebe is actually 16 years old, producing Phoebe's high school yearbook and her birth certificate. The trio coerce their men into agreeing to fund their "justice", using the money to establish a crisis centre for women, named after Cynthia and located at the former headquarters of the First Wives Club.

During the grand opening celebration, Morty concludes his affair with Shelly and reconciles with Brenda as their son Jason happily looks on. Shelly flirts with Bill, though he hesitantly probes her age. Elise, now starring in a successful Broadway play titled Of A Certain Age, has begun dating a co-star. Annie, now more confident and self-assured, rejects Aaron's request to rekindle their relationship. After the party, the three women reminisce and together triumphantly sing "You Don't Own Me", dancing into the streets.

== Cast ==
- Bette Midler as Brenda Morelli-Cushman, a wise-cracking Sicilian-Jewish single mother who helped set her husband Morty on his feet financially, before he left her for his younger employee Shelly, cheating her out of an equitable settlement. She later blackmails Morty to get ownership of his business. However, when she realizes Morty is contrite about his sins, Brenda accepts attempts at reconciliation of their relationship.
  - Michele Brilliant as young Brenda Morelli
- Goldie Hawn as Elise Eliot-Atchison, a former one-time Oscar-winning actress, now an alcoholic and heavy smoker relegated to B movies due to her "unprofitable" age. Her husband, Bill, who left her for another woman, is suing for alimony and insisting that all of their joint assets be sold and the profits be divided between them. She liquidates their assets by selling them to Annie for a very low amount, and Annie auctions them so she can buy out her husband's partners. Elise also blackmails Bill about dating a minor.
  - Dina Spybey as young Elise Eliot
- Diane Keaton as Annie MacDuggan-Paradis, the vehicle for the film's sporadic voice-over and its central character; an anxious and slightly neurotic housewife, saddled with self-esteem problems, attempting to save her marriage with estranged husband Aaron – much to her daughter's dismay. After Aaron has sex with her and then leaves her for her therapist, she decides to band together with Brenda and Elise to form the First Wives Club. Annie learns that Aaron is having problems with his advertising firm partners through the help of her daughter, and buys them out at the end of the film; making her the majority owner of Aaron's firm.
  - Adria Tennor as young Annie MacDuggan
- Maggie Smith as Gunilla Garson Goldberg, a wealthy New York City socialite who helps the First Wives Club with their schemes because she was once a first wife, as well as a "second, third and fourth wife", according to Annie. She fools the social climbing Shelly into thinking Duarto Feliz is a reputable decorator.
- Sarah Jessica Parker as Shelly Stewart, Morty's dim-witted but manipulative fiancée. It is indicated throughout the film that Shelly believes a position in high society can be obtained through money and the protagonists exploit her social-climbing attitude for their revenge. This is Parker's second film with Midler as her co-star, the first being the 1993 Disney film Hocus Pocus. Despite having a substantial supporting role, Sarah Jessica Parker is not listed in the opening credits and appears only in the closing credits.
- Dan Hedaya as Morton "Morty" Cushman, Brenda's ex-husband, an electronics tycoon, who takes advantage of his former wife's having signed an out-of-court settlement – just to finance his girlfriend Shelly's extravagant taste. He is later blackmailed into giving Brenda a substantial amount of his money when she and her Uncle Carmine obtain proof of Morty's criminal activity. This later causes him to apologize to Brenda when he realizes Shelly only loved him because of his money, leading to his and Brenda's reconciliation.
- Stockard Channing as Cynthia Swann-Griffin, a college friend of the three main protagonists, who dies by suicide after her husband, Gil, leaves her and marries his young mistress three days after their divorce is finalized.
  - Juliehera Destefano as young Cynthia
- Victor Garber as Bill Atchison, a successful film producer, who rose to fame through Elise's connections and eventually left her in favor of a young starlet
- Stephen Collins as Aaron Paradis, Annie's conflicted husband and CEO of an advertising agency, who leaves his wife for their therapist, Leslie Rosen. Eventually, he is left alone as Leslie runs off and Annie does not want him back.
- Elizabeth Berkley as Phoebe LaVelle, an up-and-coming actress, living with Bill. Bill is under the impression she is 21, but Elise investigates and reveals to Bill that she is 16 years old and a high school dropout.
- Marcia Gay Harden as Dr. Leslie Rosen, a therapist treating both Annie and Aaron, the former for her self-esteem issues. In truth, she cares only for the fees she can charge. Aaron has an affair with her, but Leslie is quick to desert him when he loses control of his business.
- Bronson Pinchot as Duarto Feliz, Brenda's boss and (according to Annie) "one of the ten worst interior decorators in New York City". He uses his role as decorator to help the First Wives Club sneak into Morty and Shelly's apartment.
- Jennifer Dundas as Christine "Chris" Paradis, Annie's lesbian and feminist daughter, who resents her father for what he is putting her mother through. She gets a job working at her father's advertising firm to spy on him for Annie. This is the second film in which Dundas plays Keaton's daughter, having previously done so in Mrs. Soffel.
- Eileen Heckart as Catherine MacDuggan, Annie's "controlling" mother. By the end of the film, she tells Annie that she is proud of her and does not need anyone to make her happy.
- Philip Bosco as Uncle Carmine Morelli, Brenda's paternal uncle and part of her family's Sicilian Mafia connections. He is the one who informs Brenda that Morty had his stores stocked with stolen electronics, which the Mafia had done to help Morty and Brenda financially during the shaky early years of their marriage.
- Rob Reiner as Dr. Morris Packman, who warns Elise against overdoing it on plastic surgery
- James Naughton as Gil Griffin, Cynthia's ex-husband
- Ari Greenberg as Jason Cushman, Brenda's son, who is caught in an emotional battle between his parents
- Aida Linares as Teresa, Cynthia's loyal maid
- Ivana Trump as herself
- Kathie Lee Gifford as herself
- Gloria Steinem as herself
- Edward I. Koch as himself
- Lea DeLaria as Elise's fan
- Debra Monk as jilted lover
- Walter Bobbie as man in bed
- Kate Burton as woman in bed
- Gregg Edelman as Mark Loest
- Harsh Nayyar as Mohammed
- Timothy Olyphant as Brett Artounian, a film director who is interested in casting Elise as the main character's aging mother in his new film
- Edward Hibbert as Maurice, a barman serving Elise as she drowns her sorrows
- J. K. Simmons as federal marshal
- Heather Locklear as Mary Birmingham, Gil's new wife (uncredited)

== Development ==
=== Writing ===
The First Wives Club, released in 1992, was American author Olivia Goldsmith's debut novel. Inspired by her own experiences and observations of divorce, gender inequality, and aging in relationships, it became a national bestseller and received widespread critical acclaim. Even before the book was published, Goldsmith's manuscript found its way into the hands of film studio executive Sherry Lansing, who, despite the fact that many publishers had rejected it, immediately recognized its cinematic potential. In a 1996 interview with The New York Times, she described it as "one of the single best ideas for a movie" she had ever encountered, noting that the scenario of a woman being left for a younger version of herself was far too common. She emphasized, however, that the intent was not to create a film portraying women as victims, but rather a story centered on empowerment.

When Lansing became CEO of Paramount Pictures in 1992, she commissioned in-house producer Scott Rudin to develop the project into a feature film. Rudin initially consulted Robert Harling to write the screenplay, but Harling later departed the project to direct the comedy drama film The Evening Star (1996), the sequel to the 1983's Terms of Endearment. Dissatisfied with Harling's screenplay, Rudin turned to his friend Paul Rudnick, a playwright and screenwriter, who agreed to do the rewrites but insisted on remaining uncredited for the film. Rudnick later criticized the final script as "incomprehensible," telling The New York Times in 1997 that deciphering the film's structure would require "an undiscovered Rosetta Stone." Nancy Meyers was originally offered the opportunity to direct The First Wives Club but declined. At the time, she had signed a development deal with Disney and chose instead to make her directorial debut with The Parent Trap (1998). Hugh Wilson was eventually brought on board to direct the film.

=== Casting ===
Casting for The First Wives Club was overseen by Ilene Starger, who served as a casting consultant to Rudin. The process spanned several months and involved a combination of extending offers to established actors based on their stature and experience, auditioning others, with most of the film's cast being selected in New York. Bette Midler and Goldie Hawn were the first actresses reported to have landed one of the three starring roles. While Midler had wanted to play the "more glamorous role" of Elise at first, Rudin intended to cast Jessica Lange in the role before the team decided to rewrite the character of the book in favour of a "glitzier" version which eventually went to Hawn. Hawn, in turn, tried to persuade Sally Field to join the cast in the role of Annie but Field declined, citing her lack of musicality. The role eventually went to Diane Keaton who was cast by Rudin while they were working on the drama film Marvin's Room (1996), directed by Jerry Zaks.

Mandy Patinkin was initially cast as Aaron, Annie's conflicted husband, but dropped out shortly before shooting started when he decided to leave the project in favour of his musical ambitions, and was replaced by Stephen Collins. The role of Duarto originally went to writer David Rakoff though he was fired after only one day on set and replaced by Bronson Pinchot. Jon Stewart was hired to play the lover of Hawn's character Elise; however, his scenes were later cut from the final film. Dan Hedaya won the role of Morty, Brenda's ex-husband, over Héctor Elizondo. Jenny McCarthy was offered the role of Phoebe LaVelle but declined, stating that she did not want to portray what she described as a "dumb girl" character. The role was ultimately taken by Elizabeth Berkley. Timothy Olyphant, who had impressed with local stage work, made his screen debut as director Brett Artounian in the film, while Jennifer Dundas, following her appearance in Mrs. Soffel (1984), once again portrayed Keaton's onscreen daughter. Cameos of note include Ivana Trump (who famously stated in the film, "Don't get mad, get everything."), Gloria Steinem, and Kathie Lee Gifford as themselves, as well as author Olivia Goldsmith, director Hugh Wilson as a commercial director, and Heather Locklear as Mary Birmingham, the younger lover of James Naughton's character Gil.

=== Production ===
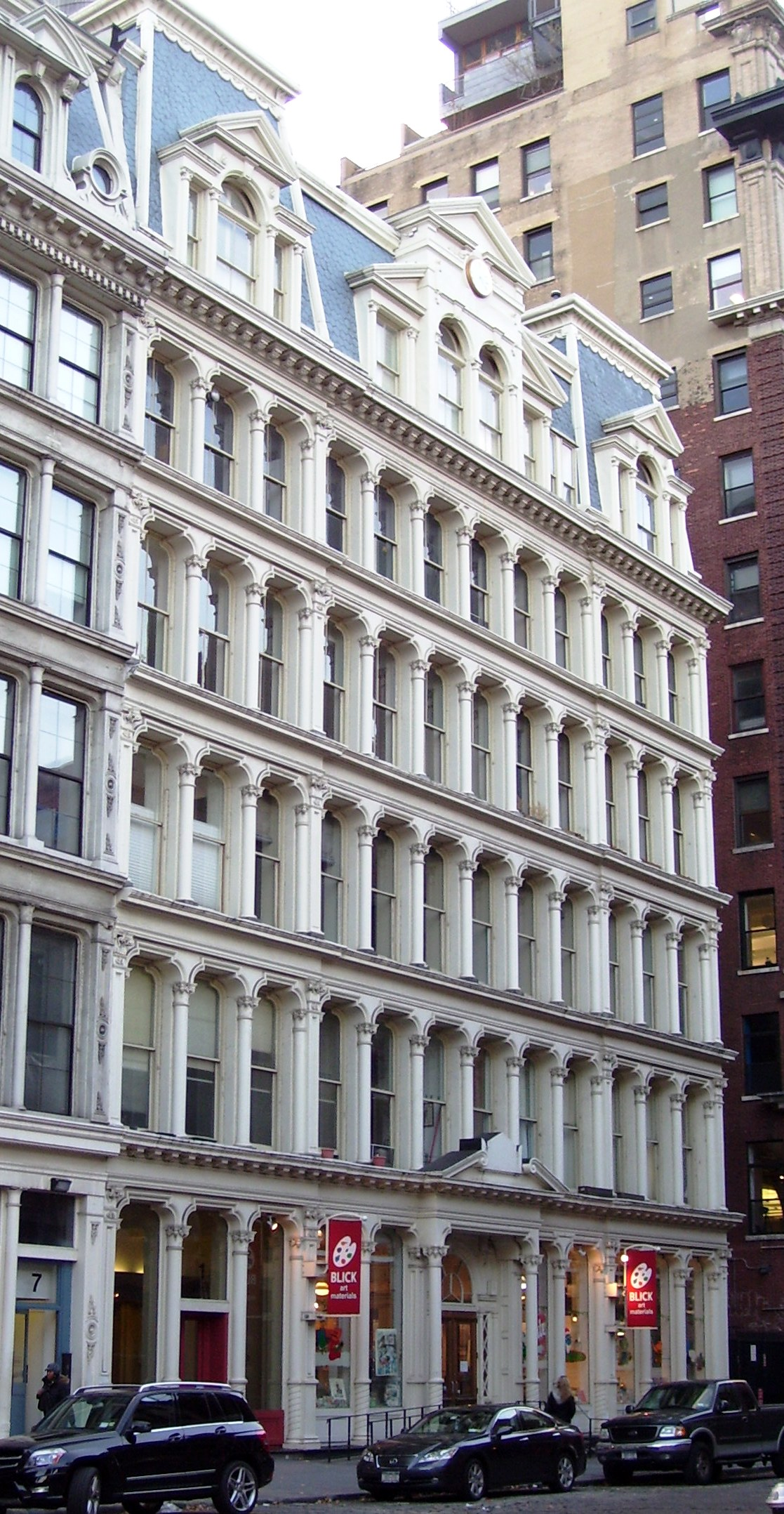
The last scene in the club was filmed at the Robbins & Appleton Building in NoHo, Manhattan

Principal photography took place over three months at the Kaufman Astoria Studios in Queens, New York City, between December 4, 1995, and March 19, 1996. Among the 60 sites showcased on screen are Christie's auction house in the Delmonico's Hotel grand ballroom on Park Avenue, The Pierre at East 61st Street, the Bowery Bar, a suite at The Waldorf-Astoria Hotel in Midtown Manhattan, Café des Artistes on One West 67th Street, the King Cole Bar at the St. Regis Hotel, Frank E. Campbell's funeral home, and Barneys. Other familiar sites include the Chrysler Building, the NoHo neighborhood, both 5th and 7th Avenues, Riverside Drive, and Central Park. The last scene in the club was filmed at the Robbins & Appleton Building on 4 Bond Street.

Production designer Peter Larkin took much inspiration from Hollywood's romantic comedies of the 1930s, incorporating a post-Great Depression view on style and luxury, widely popularized through these films. "Those sets looked better than real New York penthouses and nightclubs ever could," he said upon creation. "In this film, I wanted settings that had that kind of striking nature." The film's final scene, a musical number featuring Midler, Hawn, and Keaton performing Lesley Gore's 1963 hit single "You Don't Own Me" was conceived during production due to the absence of a concluding sequence. Rudin suggested the idea of a musical number, and Wilson proposed using the song, which they successfully acquired. The scene was filmed in a single take during the early morning hours. Choreographed by Patricia Birch, with Jonathan Cerullo serving as her assistant choreographer, the take used in the film was the final one.

In a 2009 interview with The A.V. Club, Bronson Pinchot accused Wilson of abusing him but also claimed that it was due to Midler who was difficult to work with for the director. Wilson later stated, in a 2015 interview, that Midler indeed questioned how a "southern heterosexual with five children" was capable of directing a film about divorced women in New York high society. He also admitted that the making of the film was a difficult experience for him, citing the long working days and challenging filming conditions in New York City, which arose in part as a result of budget constraints and negative experiences working with the producer Rudin. Rudin was later accused, by numerous employees speaking to The Hollywood Reporter, of demonstrating a long-standing pattern of abusive behavior towards his employees, including physical abuse.

== Music ==
=== Soundtrack ===
The First Wives Club: Music from the Motion Picture... And Then Some

Soundtrack album by Various Artists
- Released: September 17, 1996
- Label: Work

An official soundtrack album titled The First Wives Club: Music from the Motion Picture... And Then Some was released on September 17, 1996, through Work, shortly before the film's premiere. The compilation peaked at number 90 on the US Billboard 200 chart.

==== Track listing ====
The First Wives Club: Music from the Motion Picture... And Then Some track listing
No.	Title	Writer(s)	Producer(s)	Length
1.	"Wives and Lovers" (Dionne Warwick)	Burt Bacharach; Hal David	Bacharach; David	2:55
2.	"A Beautiful Morning" (The Rascals)	Felix Cavaliere; Eddie Brigati	The Rascals	2:33
3.	"Over and Over" (Puff Johnson)	Phil Galdston; Reed Vertelney; Alan Roy Scott	Keith Thomas	4:43
4.	"Piece of My Heart" (Diana King)	Jerry Ragovoy; Bert Berns	Andy Marvel	3:41
5.	"Game of Love" (Brownstone)	Gordon Chambers; Rich Stroud; Kelvin Anderson	Dave Hall; Stroud^{[a]}; Anderson^{[a]}	4:45
6.	"Love Is On the Way" (Billy Porter)	Denise Rich; Peter Zizzo; Tina Shafer	Zizzo	4:22
7.	"Sisters Are Doin' It for Themselves" (Eurythmics and Aretha Franklin)	Annie Lennox; David A. Stewart	Stewart	5:53
8.	"Think" (Aretha Franklin)	Franklin; Ted White	Jerry Wexler	2:17
9.	"Heartbreak Road" (Dionne Farris)	Bill Withers	Dionne Farris; Randy Jackson	3:51
10.	"I Will Survive" (Chantay Savage)	Freddie Perren; Dino Fekaris	Steve "Silk" Hurley	6:13
11.	"Moving On Up" (M People)	Mike Pickering; Paul Heard	M People; Todd Terry^{[a]}	3:56
12.	"I'm Still Standing" (Martha Wash)	Elton John; Bernie Taupin	Marvel; "Bonzai" Jim Caruso	4:02
13.	"You Don't Own Me" (Bette Midler, Goldie Hawn and Diane Keaton)	John Madara; Dave White	Marc Shaiman	2:31

=== Score ===
==== Track listing ====
The film's original score, composed by Marc Shaiman, was also released on November 26, 1996.

The First Wives Club – Original Motion Picture Score track listing
No.	Title	Length
1.	"Cynthia"	2:14
2.	"Annie"	0:46
3.	"Elise"	0:47
4.	"Brenda"	0:45
5.	"Bad News"	0:51
6.	"Wham, Bam, Divorce Me Ma'am"	1:23
7.	"Letter to Three Wives"	1:56
8.	"The First Wives Club"	1:48
9.	"Gathering Information"	1:55
10.	"Setting Up Shop"	1:11
11.	"Tea Time with Gunilla"	2:53
12.	"Duarto Makes His Entrance"	0:41
13.	"The Big Break In"	5:17
14.	"Phone Tag"	0:59
15.	"The Auction"	1:58
16.	"Operation Hell Hath No Fury"	4:45
17.	"The Unveiling"	0:56

== Reception ==
=== Box office ===
The First Wives Club grossed $105.4 million in the United States and Canada, and $76 million in other territories, for a worldwide total of $181.4 million. becoming the 11th highest-grossing film of 1996. The film also ranked 11th on the 1996 North American box office year-end list while leading the yearly PG Rated 1996 chart.

In the United States and Canada, the movie opened at number one at the box office, making $18.9 million in its opening weekend over September 20–22, 1996. It remained another two weeks at number one, earning an estimated $42 million within its first month of release, a September record by then. Industry sources said that the film, cited as the "sleeper of the year" by The Los Angeles Times, clicked with an untargeted group of ticket buyers who were overlooked as studios poured out special effects and loud action films during the summer of 1996.

=== Critical reception ===
The First Wives Club received mixed reviews from film critics. On the review aggregator website Rotten Tomatoes, 56% of 138 critics' reviews are positive, with an average rating of 5.9/10. The website's consensus reads: "First Wives Club is headlined by a trio of comedic dynamos, but the script lets them down with tepid plotting and a fatal lack of satirical bite." On Metacritic, which uses a normalized rating system, the film holds a 58/100 rating, indicating "mixed or average reviews" based on 21 critics.

Edward Guthmann of the San Francisco Chronicle called the film a "terrific comedy" and "a glamorous revenge romp, a 9 to 5 mixed with Auntie Mame", giving "each star the opportunity to do her best work in a long, long time." He added that "what's surprising isn't that each of them is so delightfully good but that they work together so well." In his review for Variety, Leonard Klady found that director "Hugh Wilson wisely gets out of the way of his performers, providing a simple glossy look enhanced by cameraman Donald Thorin, designer Peter Larkin and the costumes of Theoni V. Aldredge". He noted that "with its combination of comic zingers and star turns, [the] pic shapes up as one of the more commercial fall [1996] entries", that "at its core, is a celebration of its star trio as consummate performers. In that respect, First Wives Club is a highly enjoyable movie romp."

Janet Maslin from The New York Times remarked that the film "freely overhauls the amusing beach book by Olivia Goldsmith, eliminating the sex, adding more slapstick and tailoring the leading roles to suit three divas in starring roles." While she felt that "Bette Midler, Diane Keaton, and Goldie Hawn make a spirited, surprisingly harmonious trio," reeling off "one-liners with accomplished flair, even when the film turns silly and begins to, pardon the expression, sag", she found that the film fared "better with sight gags and quick retorts than with plot development". Roger Ebert, writing for the Chicago Sun-Times gave The First Wives Club two out of four stars. He declared the film "heavy on incident but light on plot", filled with "heartfelt talks with slapstick and sitcom situations." Owen Gleiberman, writer for Entertainment Weekly, wrote that "paced like a Chris Farley movie and photographed like a denture-cream commercial, The First Wives Club is the sort of overbright plastic-package comedy that tends to live or die by its jokes, its farcical audacity – anything but its 'conviction'." He gave the film a C+ rating.

According to a 2023 poll by Costa Coffee, The First Wives Club was named by Brits as one of the top ten movies to help them "overcome heartbreak and move on". The film has accrued a cult following in subsequent years, particularly amongst women and the LGBTQ+ community.

=== Accolades ===
The First Wives Club earned composer Marc Shaiman his third Academy Award nomination. In 2000, the film earned recognition from the American Film Institute when it was shortlisted for the organization's AFI's 100 Years...100 Laughs listing.

List of awards and nominations
Award	Category	Recipient(s)	Result
Academy Awards	Best Original Musical or Comedy Score	Marc Shaiman	Nominated
American Comedy Awards	Funniest Actress in a Motion Picture (Leading Role)	Diane Keaton	Nominated
American Comedy Awards	Funniest Actress in a Motion Picture (Leading Role)	Bette Midler	Nominated
American Comedy Awards	Funniest Actress in a Motion Picture (Leading Role)	Goldie Hawn	Nominated
ASCAP Film and Television Music Awards	Top Box Office Films	Marc Shaiman	Won
Artios Awards	Best Casting for Feature Film, Comedy	Ilene Starger	Nominated
Blockbuster Entertainment Awards	Favorite Actress – Comedy	Goldie Hawn	Won
National Board of Review Awards	Best Acting by an Ensemble	Cast of The First Wives Club	Won
Satellite Awards	Best Actress − Musical or Comedy	Bette Midler	Nominated
Satellite Awards	Best Supporting Actress − Musical or Comedy	Sarah Jessica Parker	Nominated

== Further developments ==
=== Sequel ===
Hawn, Keaton, and Midler made concerted efforts to get have a sequel made. In 2004, writer Paul Rudnick reportedly started writing a draft, entitled Avon Ladies of the Amazon, and in 2005, Midler told USA Today that there was a manuscript but that "the strike kept it from happening." In a 2006 interview with the New York Daily News, Hawn said that executives at Paramount Pictures rejected the trio's return after they sought higher fees. In 2015, Hawn, Keaton, and Midler signed on to star in the Netflix comedy film Divanation together, but the project failed to materialize. In 2016, Hawn stated that Netflix was working on a sequel to The First Wives Club but that "the script isn't working." Another film to feature the trio, entitled Family Jewels and announced in 2020, likewise never came to fruition. In 2022, Midler pointed to "political reasons" for why a sequel was not realized. Keaton died in 2025.

=== On stage ===
A musical stage version of The First Wives Club opened at The Old Globe Theatre in San Diego, California in 2009, prior to a projected Broadway engagement. Directed by Francesca Zambello and based on a book by Rupert Holmes, the principal cast originally included Karen Ziemba as Annie, Adriane Lenox as Elise, Barbara Walsh as Brenda, John Dossett as Aaron, Kevyn Morrow as Bill, Brad Oscar as Morty, Sara Chase as Trophy Wife, and Sam Harris as Duane. The production's tryout received mixed to negative reviews, but sold approximately 29,000 tickets in its five-week run. The ticket demand was so strong early on that the show's run was extended an extra week prior to its opening night.

Producers announced on November 11, 2009, that Francesca Zambello withdrew as director, and they would secure a new director prior to any Broadway run. The originating producers, Jonas Neilson and Paul Lambert, teamed with Elizabeth Williams and John Frost, and brought on Simon Phillips to direct. A newly adapted version of First Wives Club: The Musical began previews at Chicago's Oriental Theatre in February 2015, with the opening on March. The production aimed for Broadway in the 2015–2016 season. Based on a new book written by Linda Bloodworth-Thomason, the newly adapted version features new songs by the composers Holland-Dozier-Holland, and also contains a few of their classic hits, such as "Reach Out...I'll Be There", "Stop! In the Name of Love" and "I Can't Help Myself (Sugar Pie, Honey Bunch)." Faith Prince, Christine Sherrill, and Carmen Cusack lead the cast as Brenda, Elise, and Annie respectively.

=== TV series ===
TV Land announced in March 2016, that it had ordered a pilot for a television adaptation of the film, to be written by Rebecca Addelman and executive produced by Jenny Bicks and Karen Rosenfelt. However, the network failed to pick up the pilot. The project went to the Paramount Network for redevelopment in early 2017. In October 2017, Tracy Oliver was tapped to write the series.
