= Rupert Holmes =

British-American composer, singer-songwriter and playwright (born 1947)

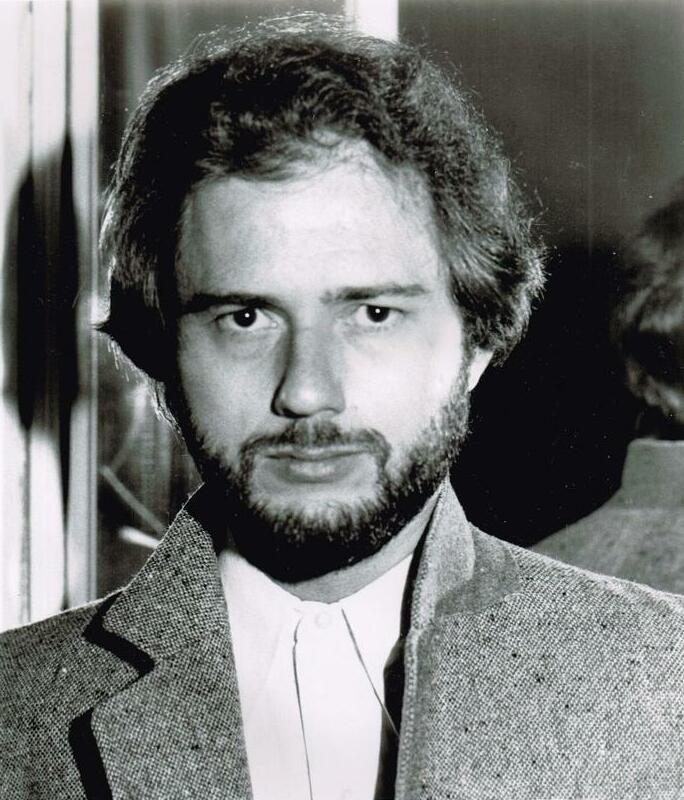
- Holmes in 1979

Background information
- Born: David Goldstein; February 24, 1947 (age 79); Northwich, Cheshire, England
- Origin: Nanuet, New York, U.S.
- Genres: Soft rock; pop rock; show tunes
- Occupations: Composer; singer-songwriter; playwright; author
- Instruments: Vocals; keyboards; saxophone
- Years active: 1969–present
- Labels: Epic; Infinity; MCA; Elektra
- Spouse: Liza Dreifuss (m. 1969)
- Website: rupertholmes.com

Rupert Holmes (born David Goldstein; February 24, 1947) is a British-born American dramatist and author, and formerly a composer, singer-songwriter and music producer. He is widely known for the hit singles "Escape (The Piña Colada Song)" (1979) and "Him" (1980). He is also known for his musicals The Mystery of Edwin Drood, which earned him two Tony Awards, and Curtains, his television series Remember WENN, and his novel Murder Your Employer: The McMasters Guide to Homicide.

== Personal life ==
Holmes was born David Goldstein in Northwich, Cheshire, England. His father, Leonard Eliot Goldstein, was a United States Army warrant officer and bandleader. His mother, Gwendolen Mary (née Pynn), was English, and both were musical. Holmes has dual British and American citizenship. The family moved when Holmes was six years old to the northern New York City suburb of Nanuet, New York, where Holmes grew up and attended nearby Nyack High School and then the Manhattan School of Music (majoring in clarinet). Holmes's brother, Richard, a principal lyric baritone with the New York Gilbert and Sullivan Players, has sung roles with regional opera companies, such as Glimmerglass, Lake George and Virginia Opera, and has appeared with the Metropolitan Opera.

In 1969, Holmes married childhood friend Elizabeth "Liza" Wood Dreifuss, an attorney. Their daughter Wendy died suddenly in 1986, at the age of ten, of an undiagnosed brain tumor. They have two sons: Nick, a filmmaker, and Timothy, who is autistic. In 2009, they moved from Scarsdale, New York, where they had lived since Wendy's death, to Cold Spring, New York.

== Career ==
=== Songwriter and recording artist ===
In his 20s, Holmes was a session musician (producing sessions, writing and arranging songs, singing and playing a few instruments). In 1969, Holmes and Ron Dante of the Cuff Links (and the Archies) recorded "Jennifer Tomkins" for release on their second album, The Cuff Links. During the recording of that album, Dante was prohibited by the studio that produced the Archies from any involvement in new recording ventures and was forced to drop out of the Cuff Links. Holmes finished the project and released "Jennifer Tomkins" separately under a different studio name, Street People (not related to the mid-1970s band the Street People). The song was on the Billboard Hot 100 for 15 weeks, beginning January 3, 1970, reaching a peak of number 36. In Canada the song reached number 21. A follow-up single called "Thank You Girl" reached number 96 on the Billboard pop charts in April 1970.

Holmes played the piano for both the Cuff Links and the Buoys, with whom he had his first international hit, "Timothy", which was on the Hot 100 for 17 weeks beginning on January 2, 1971, a number 17 song about human cannibalism that intentionally drew controversy. He also wrote "Give Up Your Guns" (which peaked at number 84), "The Prince of Thieves", "Blood Knot", and "Tomorrow" for the band. Holmes also wrote jingles and pop tunes (including for Gene Pitney, the Platters, the Drifters, Wayne Newton, Dolly Parton, Barry Manilow and television's the Partridge Family), as well as the score of the 1970 revenge western Five Savage Men (also known as The Animals), which starred Keenan Wynn.

As a recording artist, Holmes broke through with his first album, 1974's Widescreen on Epic Records, which introduced him as a presenter of highly romantic, lushly orchestrated "story songs" that told a witty narrative punctuated by clever rhymes and a hint of comedy. Barbra Streisand discovered this album and asked to record songs from it, launching Holmes on a successful career. She then used some of his songs in the movie A Star Is Born. Holmes also arranged, conducted, and wrote songs on her 1975 album Lazy Afternoon as well as five other Streisand albums. Holmes's second, self-titled album led Rolling Stone to compare him with Bob Dylan as an artist of unprecedented originality who commanded attention.

Holmes's production skills were also in demand during this period, and he took on this role for Lynsey de Paul's album Tigers and Fireflies, which spawned the radio hit "Hollywood Romance". The album also featured the bluesy song "'Twas", co-written by Holmes and de Paul. He additionally produced Sparks' 1976 LP, Big Beat, though the album was not a success. In 1975, together with Jeffrey Lesser, Holmes produced the UK band Sailor's album Trouble (CBS Epic).

"Escape (The Piña Colada Song)" was on Holmes's fifth album, Partners in Crime, and was the final Hot 100 number 1 of 1979. Another popular song on that album was "Him", which peaked at number 6 on the Hot 100. Holmes had another top-40 hit with "Answering Machine". In 1986, Holmes's composition "You Got It All" (sometimes called "You Got It All Over Him") was a top 3 hit single for the Jets; it was later recorded by Britney Spears and featured in her internationally released version of Oops!... I Did It Again (2000). His song "The People That You Never Get to Love" was featured on four albums by Susannah McCorkle: The People That You Never Get to Love (1981), From Bessie to Brazil (1993), Most Requested Songs (2001), and Ballad Essentials (2002). Frank Sinatra Jr. also recorded the tune on his 2006 album That Face!

In the 1980s and 1990s, Holmes also played in cabarets and comedy clubs, mostly in New York City, telling often autobiographical anecdotes illustrated with his songs. In 2021, Holmes received an honorary Doctor of Musical Arts degree from the Manhattan School of Music.

=== Playwright ===
Holmes made his professional debut as a playwright with the musical The Mystery of Edwin Drood in 1985. Joseph Papp and his wife encouraged Holmes to write a musical after they attended one of his cabarets in 1983. The result, loosely based on Charles Dickens's unfinished novel The Mystery of Edwin Drood, and inspired by Holmes's memories of English pantomime shows he attended as a child, was a hit in New York's Central Park and on Broadway. Because Dickens left the novel unfinished at his death, Holmes employed the unusual device of providing alternate endings for each character suspected of the murder, and letting the audience vote on a different murderer each night. The show earned Holmes the Tony Award for both book and score, as well as the Drama Desk Awards for lyrics, music, the book and orchestrations, among various other honors. The musical has been given London and Broadway revivals, among others, garnering another Tony nomination for best revival. Drood's success led Holmes to write other plays (both musical and non-) in later years, though he has said that he avoided musical theater for some time after his daughter's death.

Holmes also wrote Say Goodnight, Gracie (2003), which was nominated for a Tony Award for Best Play, based on the relationship between George Burns and Gracie Allen. The play, which starred Frank Gorshin, was that Broadway season's longest-running play and became the third-longest-running solo-performance show in Broadway history; it also won the National Broadway Theatre Award for best play in 2004. He wrote the comedy-thriller Accomplice in 1990, the second of Holmes's plays to receive an Edgar Award (after Drood) and also won a Mystery Writers of America award. Holmes has written a number of other shows, including Solitary Confinement, which played on Broadway at the Nederlander Theatre in 1992 and set a new Kennedy Center box office record before its Broadway run; Thumbs, the most successful play in the history of the Helen Hayes Theatre Company; and the musical Marty (2002), starring John C. Reilly. He wrote the book to Swango: The Theatrical Dance Experience, a swing-tango dance piece that premiered Off-Broadway in 2002 inspired by Romeo and Juliet. It has had several revivals. Holmes joined the creative team of the musical Curtains after the deaths of both Peter Stone (the original book-writer) and Fred Ebb (the lyricist). Holmes rewrote Stone's original book and contributed additional lyrics to the Kander and Ebb songs. Curtains played at the Al Hirschfeld Theatre on Broadway, with David Hyde Pierce and Debra Monk in the lead roles. Holmes and Peter Stone (posthumously) won the 2007 Drama Desk Award for Outstanding Book of a Musical and was nominated for two more Tonys for Curtains.

Holmes wrote the book of the musical The First Wives' Club, adapted from the film The First Wives Club. The musical premiered at The Old Globe Theater in San Diego, California in 2009. Its score is by Lamont Dozier, Brian Holland and Eddie Holland. The production received generally unenthusiastic reviews but sold well. Linda Bloodworth-Thomason wrote a new book, and the reworked show opened in Chicago in 2015. Holmes next wrote the book for a jukebox musical, Robin and the 7 Hoods, inspired by the 1964 film Robin and the 7 Hoods starring Frank Sinatra, with a new story line that Holmes set in 1962. Songs are by Sammy Cahn and Jimmy Van Heusen, including "My Kind of Town". A production ran in 2010, also at the Old Globe. Casey Nicholaw directed and choreographed. The story is about a likable gangster hoping to get out of the crime business. A do-gooder TV reporter likens him to a modern-day Robin Hood.

Holmes adapted the John Grisham novel and film A Time to Kill for the stage. The play premiered at the Arena Stage in Washington, D.C., in 2011. The courtroom drama, set against a background of evolving 1980s Southern racial politics, was called "funny, shocking, witty, and sly". He wrote the book and lyrics for The Nutty Professor, a musical based on the 1963 film The Nutty Professor. Marvin Hamlisch wrote the score. The musical was directed by Jerry Lewis and premiered in Nashville, Tennessee, in 2012. With Hamlisch, he also wrote songs for the 2013 Liberace biopic Behind the Candelabra. He next wrote the book of Secondhand Lions: A New Musical, which premiered in Seattle, Washington, in 2013. A Time to Kill was produced on Broadway, but lasted only four weeks plus previews, closing on November 17, 2013. In 2016, The Sweet Potato Queens, with music by Melissa Manchester, lyrics by Sharon Vaughn and a book by Holmes, premiered at TUTS Underground.

Holmes's play All Things Equal: The Life and Trials of Ruth Bader Ginsburg is a one-woman show starring Michelle Azar as Supreme Court Justice Ruth Bader Ginsburg (RBG). The play takes place in RBG's chambers, where she shares stories of her career, life and struggles such as losing her mother, raising a child while studying law at Harvard, and fighting for women's rights in the 1970s. The piece has toured the U.S. since 2022 and has dates scheduled into 2026. Holmes adapted the libretto of The Pirates of Penzance with a New Orleans setting for Roundabout Theatre Company's production Pirates! The Penzance Musical, which played on Broadway from April to July 2025. A concert of this concept was staged in October 2022 by Roundabout.

=== Television writer and novelist ===
In 1996, Holmes created the AMC television series Remember WENN for American Movie Classics, writing the theme song and writing or co-writing all but one of the 56 episodes of that series. In 2003, he published his first novel, Where the Truth Lies (later adapted into the film Where the Truth Lies by Atom Egoyan), followed in 2005 by Swing, a multimedia release combining a novel with a music CD providing clues to the mystery. His next novel, Murder Your Employer: The McMasters Guide to Homicide (2023); peaked at number six on the New York Times Best Seller list for hardcover fiction on March 12, 2023.

== Discography ==
=== Albums ===
This discography does not include others' collections or albums released without Holmes's participation.

Widescreen
- Released: 1974
- Label: Epic
- Format: LP
Rupert Holmes
- Released: 1975
- Label: Epic
- Format: LP
Singles
- Released: 1976
- Label: Epic
- Format: LP
Pursuit of Happiness
- Released: 1978
- Label: Private Stock
- Format: LP
Partners in Crime
- Released: 1979
- Label: Infinity
- Format: LP, cassette
Adventure
- Released: 1980
- Label: MCA
- Format: LP, cassette
Full Circle
- Released: 1981
- Label: Elektra
- Format: LP, cassette
Scenario
- Released: 1994
- Label: Victor
- Format: CD
Epoch Collection
- Released: September 27, 1994
- Label: Varèse Sarabande
- Format: CD
Widescreen (reissue)
- Released: February 28, 1995
- Label: Varèse Sarabande
- Format: CD
The Best of Rupert Holmes
- Released: 1998
- Label: Half Moon/Universal
- Format: CD, digital
Rupert Holmes / Greatest Hits
- Released: July 25, 2000
- Label: Hip-O /Universal
- Format: CD, digital
Widescreen – The Collector's Edition
- Released: August 7, 2001
- Label: Fynsworth Alley
- Format: CD
- Note: eleven cuts not previously released
Best 1200
- Released: June 25, 2005
- Label: Hip-O Select/Universal
- Format: CD
Cast of Characters – The Rupert Holmes Songbook
- Released: July 1, 2005
- Label: Hip-O Select/Universal
- Format: CD
- Note: Box set with previously unreleased track
The Mystery of Edwin Drood – original Broadway cast recording
- Released: December 10, 2012
- Label: Polygram
- Format: CD, digital

Holmes also wrote, arranged, played keyboards and co-produced on the disco project Shobizz, released in 1979 by Capitol Records. He also featured as a vocalist on the 1983 album Lake Freeze - The Raccoons Songtrack by the Raccoons.

=== Singles ===
| Year | Single | Peak chart positions | | | | | | | Certifications | Album |
| Year | Single | US Hot 100 | US AC | AUS | CAN | NED | NZ | UK | Certifications | Album |
|---|---|---|---|---|---|---|---|---|---|---|
| 1974 | "Talk" | — | — | — | — | — | — | — | | Widescreen |
| 1974 | "Terminal" | — | — | — | — | — | — | — | | Widescreen |
| 1974 | "Our National Pastime" | — | — | — | — | — | — | — | | Widescreen |
| 1975 | "I Don't Want to Hold Your Hand" | — | — | — | — | — | — | — | | Rupert Holmes |
| 1975 | "Deco Lady" | — | — | — | — | — | — | — | | Rupert Holmes |
| 1976 | "Weekend Lover" | — | — | — | — | — | — | — | | Singles |
| 1976 | "Who, What, When, Where, Why" | — | — | — | — | — | — | — | | Singles |
| 1978 | "Bedside Companions" | — | — | — | — | — | — | — | | Pursuit of Happiness |
| 1978 | "Let's Get Crazy Tonight" | 72 | — | — | 59 | — | — | — | | Pursuit of Happiness |
| 1979 | "Escape (The Piña Colada Song)" | 1 | 8 | 3 | 1 | 13 | 4 | 23 | BPI: Platinum; RMNZ: 4× Platinum | Partners in Crime |
| 1980 | "Him" | 6 | 4 | 42 | 14 | 18 | 8 | 31 | | Partners in Crime |
| 1980 | "Answering Machine" | 32 | 12 | — | 85 | — | — | — | | Partners in Crime |
| 1980 | "Morning Man" | 68 | 21 | 94 | — | — | — | — | | Adventure |
| 1981 | "Blackjack" | 103 | — | — | — | — | — | — | | Adventure |
| 1981 | "I Don't Need You" | 56 | 21 | — | — | — | — | — | | Adventure |
| 1981 | "Loved by the One You Love" | 103 | 35 | — | — | — | — | — | | Full Circle |
| 1982 | "The End" | — | 31 | — | — | — | — | — | | Full Circle |
| 1983 | "At Our House" (released as the B-side to "Lake Freeze" by Rita Coolidge) | — | — | — | — | — | — | — | | Lake Freeze: The Raccoons Songtrack |
"–" denotes releases that did not chart

== Other works ==
=== Theatre ===
- The Mystery of Edwin Drood
- Twelfth Night
- Accomplice
- The Hamburger Hamlet
- Solitary Confinement
- Goosebumps
- Say Goodnight, Gracie
- Thumbs
- Marty
- Curtains
- Swango
- A Time to Kill
- The Picture of Dorian Gray
- The First Wives' Club
- Robin and the 7 Hoods
- The Nutty Professor
- Secondhand Lions: A New Musical
- The Sweet Potato Queens
- Pirates! The Penzance Musical

=== Film and television ===
- Remember WENN
- Hi Honey, I'm Home!
- No Small Affair
- Five Savage Men
- A Star Is Born
- Art in Heaven
- The Christmas Raccoons (voice)
- Memories Within Miss Aggie
- Wet Rainbow

=== Books ===
- Where the Truth Lies
- Swing
- Murder Your Employer: The McMasters Guide to Homicide
