= Bad Boys (soundtrack) =

Bad Boys: Music from the Motion Picture

Soundtrack album by various artists
- Released: March 21, 1995
- Recorded: 1994–1995
- Genres: Hip hop; R&B; industrial rock
- Length: 1:00:01
- Label: Work Records
- Producers: Don Simpson (exec.); Jerry Bruckheimer (exec.); Maureen Crowe (exec.); Andy Marvel; Jermaine Dupri; Babyface; Bernard "Touter" Harvey; C.C. Lemonhead; Charlie Wilson; Danny Sembello; Daryl Simmons; DJ Muggs; Greg Allan; Ian Lewis; Jay Ski; KMFDM; Knobody; Mark Mancina; Marti Sharron; Roger Lewis; Ronnie Wilson; Sean C; Sly and Robbie; Soulshock and Karlin; Steve Shafer; Warren G

Bad Boys soundtracks chronology
Bad Boys: Music from the Motion Picture (1995)	Bad Boys II (2003)

Singles from Bad Boys
- 1. "Shy Guy" Released: March 7, 1995; 2. "Never Find Someone Like You" Released: April 1, 1995; 3. "So Many Ways" Released: May 13, 1995; 4. "Someone to Love" Released: May 20, 1995

Professional ratings
Review scores
Source	Rating
AllMusic	3/5 stars
Smash Hits	2/5 stars

Bad Boys: Music from the Motion Picture is the soundtrack to the 1995 action-comedy film Bad Boys. It was released on March 21, 1995, through Sony Music Entertainment's sub-label Work Records. The album peaked at No. 26 on the Billboard 200 and No. 13 on the Top R&B/Hip-Hop Albums.

The charting singles were "Never Find Someone Like You" by Keith Martin which peaked at No. 42 on the Hot R&B/Hip-Hop Singles & Tracks, "Someone to Love" by Jon B. featuring Babyface which peaked at No. 10 on the Hot 100 and No. 7 on the Hot R&B/Hip-Hop Singles & Tracks and "Shy Guy" by Diana King which peaked at No. 13 on the Hot 100 and No. 21 on the Hot R&B/Hip-Hop Singles & Tracks.

The album was well received by fans of the rap/R&B genres but disappointed fans of Mark Mancina's movie score as only one of up to fifteen tracks composed for the film by Mancina was featured on the album. Also, most of the industrial rock tracks which featured primarily in the "Club Hell" scene are also missing from the album. These include "Nothing" by Stabbing Westward, "Angels" by Dink and "Sweet Little Lass" by DAG.

The original score by Mark Mancina was released in September 2007 by La-La Land Records as a limited edition of 3000 copies.

== Track listing ==
Soundtrack album

No.	Title	Producer(s)	Length
1.	"Shy Guy" (Diana King)	Andy Marvel	3:40
2.	"So Many Ways (Bad Boys Version)" (Warren G)	Warren G	3:14
3.	"Five O, Five O (Here They Come)" (69 Boyz and K-Nock)	Bass Mechanics	3:19
4.	"Boom Boom Boom" (Juster)	Greg Allan; Steve Shafer	3:51
5.	"Me Against the World" (2Pac and Dramacydal)	Soulshock & Karlin	4:39
6.	"Someone to Love" (Jon B. and Babyface)	Babyface	4:34
7.	"I've Got a Little Something for You (Radio Version)" (MN8)	Dennis Charles, Ronnie Wilson	3:40
8.	"Never Find Someone Like You" (Keith Martin)	Danny Sembello; Marti Sharron	4:30
9.	"Call the Police (Marvel/Bonzai Mix)" (Ini Kamoze)	Sly & Robbie; Andy Marvel (add.); Jim "Bonzai" Caruso (add.)	3:44
10.	"Da B Side" (Da Brat and Notorious B.I.G.)	Jermaine Dupri	3:42
11.	"Work Me Slow" (Xscape)	Daryl Simmons; Jermaine Dupri (co.)	4:06
12.	"Clouds of Smoke" (Call O' Da Wild)	DJ Muggs; Knobody; Sean C	4:42
13.	"Juke-Joint Jezebel" (KMFDM)	KMFDM	4:09
14.	"Bad Boys' Reply ('95)" (Inner Circle and Tek)	Bernard "Touter" Harvey; Ian Lewis; Roger Lewis	3:59
15.	"Theme from Bad Boys" (Mark Mancina)	Mark Mancina	4:12
Total length:			1:00:01

Notes

- Track 12 is a bonus track, not in the motion picture

Score album

=== Track listing ===
Original score composed by Mark Mancina. Additional music & Orchestra conducted by Nick Glennie-Smith.

1. "Prologue – The Car Jacking" – 4:31
2. "Bad Boys – Main Title/Heist" – 6:07
3. "Funky Brothers To PD" – 0:34
4. "Air Conditioning Inspection" – 1:07
5. "JoJo, What You Know?" – 0:39
6. "Dead Guy" – 4:55
7. "He's the Person I'd Call" – 0:52
8. "Killing Max" – 4:15
9. "The Boys Find Max" – 2:29
10. "Into Lois' Apartment" – 0:49
11. "Escape from Julie's" – 2:46
12. "You're Going to Leave Me Alone?" – 0:50
13. "Don't Honey Me Baby!" – 1:01
14. "My Bologna Has a First Name" – 4:02
15. "Julie's Got a Gun" – 0:53
16. "Escape from Club Hell/Ether Chase" – 4:33
17. "We Don't Want To Lose You" – 0:38
18. "I Mean Like Funny" – 2:00
19. "Interrogation" – 0:40
20. "Stake Out" – 0:53
21. "Tailing Lab Tech/Blown Cover" – 1:35
22. "Busted" – 0:51
23. "Footchase" – 4:23
24. "Fouchet Calling" – 0:32
25. "Hangar Shootout" – 9:14
26. "Cobra Chase/Fouchet's Death" – 4:40
27. "Bad Boys – Main Title (Edited Film Version)" – 3:36 (Bonus Track)

Total time of the La-La Land Records limited release is 70:32.

== Charts ==
=== Weekly charts ===
Chart (1995)	Peak position
Australian Albums (ARIA)	12
Austrian Albums (Ö3 Austria)	16
Belgian Albums (Ultratop Flanders)	20
Belgian Albums (Ultratop Wallonia)	8
Canada Top Albums/CDs (RPM)	14
Dutch Albums (Album Top 100)	38
Finnish Albums (Suomen virallinen lista)	40
German Albums (Offizielle Top 100)	18
Hungarian Albums (MAHASZ)	12
New Zealand Albums (RMNZ)	3
Swedish Albums (Sverigetopplistan)	26
Swiss Albums (Schweizer Hitparade)	13
US Billboard 200	26
US Top R&B/Hip-Hop Albums (Billboard)	13

=== Year-end charts ===
Chart (1995)	Position
Belgian Albums (Ultratop Wallonia)	95
Canada Top Albums/CDs (RPM)	51
US Billboard 200	161
US Top R&B/Hip-Hop Albums (Billboard)	81

== Certifications ==
Region	Certification	Certified units/sales
Canada (Music Canada)	2× Platinum	200,000^{^}
New Zealand (RMNZ)	Platinum	15,000^{^}
United Kingdom (BPI)	Gold	100,000^{*}
United States (RIAA)	Platinum	1,000,000^{^}
^{*} Sales figures based on certification alone.^{^} Shipments figures based on certification alone.
