= Respect (disambiguation) =

Respect is a positive feeling or action shown towards someone or something considered important.

Respect may also refer to:

== Arts and entertainment ==
=== Music ===
==== Albums ====
- Respect (Jimmy Smith album), 1967
- Respect (Daniel Johnston album), 1985
- Respect (Robyn Hitchcock album), 1993
- Respect (Shaquille O'Neal album), 1998
- Respect (Diana King album), 2002
- Respect (Lisa M. album), 2006
- Respect, a 1988 album by Miami Bass female rapper Anquette
- Respect, a 1994 album by Sinner
- Respect, a 2000 album by 4th Avenue Jones

==== Songs ====
- "Respect" (song), originally by Otis Redding in 1965, and made popular by Aretha Franklin in her 1967 version
- "Respect All" (song), a 2023 song by Ai alternatively titled as "Respect"
- "Respect" (Alliance Ethnik song), 1995
- "Respect" (Joel Turner song), 2005
- "Respect", a song by The Notorious B.I.G. from his 1994 album Ready to Die
- "Respect", a song by Jagged Edge from the 2001 album Jagged Little Thrill
- "Respect", a song by Pink from her 2001 album Missundaztood
- "Respect", a song by Train from the 2001 album Drops of Jupiter

=== Other arts and entertainment ===
- Respect (1996 film), a British television drama
- Respect (2021 film), a biographical drama film about the life of Aretha Franklin
- Respect, a 2021 Marathi film directed by Kishor Pandurang Belekar
- Respect (TV series), documentary series aired on independent television in the UK
- "Respect" (The Bill), two-part series finale of British police procedural drama The Bill
- "Respect" (Suits), a 2015 television episode
- Respect (UEFA campaign), a social responsibility programme run by UEFA
- Respect (magazine), an American hip hop culture annual
- Respekt, Czech weekly news magazine published since 1989

== Organisations ==
- Respect (charity), a domestic violence charity in the UK
- Respect (Haiti), a political party in Haiti
- Respect Party, a former British political party

== Other uses ==
- Respect agenda, a prominent policy of Tony Blair
