= Ain't Nobody =

1983 single by Rufus and Chaka Khan

- Side A of the US single

Single by Rufus and Chaka Khan

from the album Stompin' at the Savoy
- B-side: "Sweet Thing"
- Released: November 4, 1983
- Genre: Synth-funk
- Length: 4:41 (album version); 4:05 (single version)
- Label: Warner Bros.
- Songwriter: David "Hawk" Wolinski
- Producer: Russ Titelman

Rufus and Chaka Khan singles chronology
"Got to Be There" (1983)	"Ain't Nobody" (1983)	"One Million Kisses" (1983)

Music video
- "Ain't Nobody" on YouTube

"Ain't Nobody" is a song originally recorded by American funk band Rufus, led by singer Chaka Khan. The version was released in 1983 by Warner Bros. and then became a hit single. The song has been subsequently recorded by multiple artists.

== Production ==
Rufus keyboardist David "Hawk" Wolinski wrote the song around a repeating synthesizer loop backed by a Linn LM-1 drum computer; however, John "JR" Robinson, the band's drummer, played real drums for the recording session.

== Composition ==
The song is performed in the key of E♭ minor with a tempo of 104 beats per minute in common time. The bass synth intro however is in 9/8. Khan's vocals span from G♭_{3} to E♭_{5} in the song.

== Release and reception ==
The band held a democratic vote, and they decided to include the song in their album repertoire. Once the song was recorded, Warner executives wanted to issue another song as the album's first single. Wolinski threatened to give the song to singer Michael Jackson and producer Quincy Jones for Jackson's album Thriller if the song was not the lead-off single. The label relented and "Ain't Nobody" was issued and hit number one on the R&B chart for the week ending October 15, 1983.

It was released on November 4, 1983, by Warner Bros., as one of four studio tracks included on their live album, Stompin' at the Savoy (1983). "Ain't Nobody" quickly gathered popularity, and reached number one on the US Billboard Hot Black Singles chart and number 22 on the US Billboard Hot 100. In 1984 at the 26th Annual Grammy Awards, "Ain't Nobody" won for Best R&B Performance by a Duo or Group with Vocal. It has become one of Khan's signature songs.

The song was included on the soundtrack album to the 1984 film Breakin'. In 2000, VH1 ranked "Ain't Nobody" number 77 in their list of "100 Greatest Dance Songs". In 2021, it was ranked number 403 on Rolling Stone's 500 Greatest Songs of All Time. The song was adopted in the United Kingdom by fans of some of the country's football clubs, with the words: Ain't nobody loves (player), makes me happy, makes me feel this way.

== Charts ==
=== Weekly charts ===
Weekly chart performance
Chart (1983–1984)	Peak position
Netherlands (Single Top 100)	36
Netherlands (Dutch Top 40)	29
UK Singles (Official Charts)	8
US Billboard Hot 100	22
US Hot R&B/Hip-Hop Songs (Billboard)	1

Chart (1989)	Peak position
Europe (Eurochart Hot 100)	22
Luxembourg (Radio Luxembourg)	3
UK Singles (Official Charts)	6
West Germany (GfK)	9

=== Year-end charts ===
Year-end chart performance
Chart (1983)	Position
US Top Black Singles (Billboard)	48

Chart (1984)	Position
UK Singles (Gallup)	98

Chart (1989)	Position
UK Singles (OCC)	63
West Germany (Media Control)	71

== Certifications ==
Certifications and sales
Region	Certification	Certified units/sales
Australia (ARIA)	Platinum	70,000^{‡}
Canada (Music Canada)	Gold	40,000^{‡}
New Zealand (RMNZ)	Platinum	30,000^{‡}
United Kingdom (BPI)	2× Platinum	1,200,000^{‡}
United States (RIAA)	Platinum	1,000,000^{‡}
^{‡} Sales+streaming figures based on certification alone.

== Jaki Graham version ==
"Ain't Nobody"
- Widely used variant of the standard artwork

Single by Jaki Graham

from the album Real Life
- Released: July 1994
- Studio: Metropolis, London
- Genre: Disco; house
- Length: 3:26
- Label: Pulse-8
- Songwriter: Hawk Wolinski
- Producer: Rod Gammons

Jaki Graham singles chronology
"Round and Around" (1985)	"Ain't Nobody" (1994)	"Absolute E-Sensual" (1995)

Music video
- "Ain't Nobody" on YouTube

In 1994, British singer-songwriter Jaki Graham released her cover of "Ain't Nobody". It was released in July 1994 by various labels as the first and lead single from her fourth album, Real Life (1994). Graham's version was produced by Rod Gammons and reached number one on the US Billboard Hot Dance Club Play chart for five weeks as well as being in the top-five favorite videos for BET (Black Entertainment Charts). The single also reached number 44 in the UK, number 11 in Iceland and number 17 in Australia. The accompanying music video for "Ain't Nobody" was directed by American film director and producer Antoine Fuqua.

=== Critical reception ===
Upn the release, Larry Flick from Billboard magazine wrote, "She proves that her pipes are still in top form, and she is surrounded by a flurry of fierce disco/house beats." In a separate review, he named the song "smashing", and stated that Graham returns with a "grand reading" of the Rufus nugget. He added, "Track is the latest in an onslaught of competitive versions of the song by various divas. This one, however, is the real deal, thanks to Graham's considerable charm as well as a plethora of mixes that range from peppy NRG to muscular house. A sure-fire club hit, don't be surprised if crossover radio beckons." English Reading Evening Post commented, "This is one of those covers that doesn't really improve on the original. But the Chaka Khan song is a soul classic and Jaki Graham gives it a good shot, even if her voice doesn't seem quite powerful enough for its bitter-sweet melodrama. A hard one not to sing along with."

=== Track listings ===
CD single, US (1994)
No.	Title	Length
1.	"Ain't Nobody" (Radio Edit)	4:06
2.	"Ain't Nobody" (Dave Way Radio Remix)	4:20
3.	"Ain't Nobody" (Love To Infinity Classic Paradise Mix)	6:34
4.	"Ain't Nobody" (Love To Infinity Aphrodisiac Dub)	6:28
5.	"Ain't Nobody" (Nobody But You / Continuum Mix)	7:28
6.	"Ain't Nobody" (Development Corporation Bentley Vocal Mix)	6:16
7.	"Ain't Nobody" (Development Corporation Capri Dub)	6:12
8.	"Ain't Nobody" (Dave Way Extended Remix)	6:00

CD maxi, UK (1994)
No.	Title	Length
1.	"Ain't Nobody" (Classic Paradise Radio Mix)	3:26
2.	"Ain't Nobody" (Original Album Mix)	4:06
3.	"Ain't Nobody" (Love To Infinity Classic Paradise Mix)	6:34
4.	"Ain't Nobody" (Love To Infinity Aphrodisiac Dub)	6:28
5.	"Ain't Nobody" (Development Corporation Bentley Vocal Mix)	6:16
6.	"Ain't Nobody" (Development Corporation Capri Dub)	6:12

=== Charts ===
==== Weekly charts ====
Weekly chart performance for Jaki Graham
Chart (1994)	Peak position
Australia (ARIA)	17
Iceland (Íslenski Listinn Topp 40)	11
Scottish Singles Sales (Official Charts)	46
UK Singles (Official Charts)	44
UK Dance (Official Charts)	11
UK Dance (Music Week)	11
UK Club Chart (Music Week)	25
US Bubbling Under Hot 100 (Billboard)	1
US Dance Club Songs (Billboard)	1
US Dance Singles Sales (Billboard)	44

==== Year-end charts ====
1994 year-end chart performance for Jaki Graham version
Chart (1994)	Position
Australia (ARIA)	79
US Dance Club Play (Billboard)	19

== Diana King version ==
"Ain't Nobody"

Single by Diana King

from the album Tougher Than Love
- Released: October 16, 1995
- Recorded: Kingston, Jamaica
- Studio: Tuff Gong Studios
- Genre: Reggae; R&B; soul
- Length: 3:44
- Label: Columbia; Work
- Songwriter: Hawk Wolinski
- Producer: Handel Tucker

Diana King singles chronology
"Shy Guy" (1994)	"Ain't Nobody" (1995)	"I Say a Little Prayer" (1997)

Music video
- "Ain't Nobody" on YouTube

In 1995, Jamaican singer-songwriter Diana King recorded a cover single of "Ain't Nobody". It was released in October 1995 by Columbia Records and Work Group as the third single from their debut album, Tougher Than Love (1995). The song was produced by Handel Tucker and recorded in Bob Marley's recording studio Tuff Gong in Kingston, Jamaica. It peaked at number 95 on the US Billboard Hot 100, number four on the Billboard Hot Dance Club Play chart and number 13 on the UK Singles Chart. Its music video was directed by Kevin Bray.

=== Critical reception ===
Larry Flick from Billboard magazine complimented the song as a "sexy hip hop interpretation" and "irresistible", complimenting King's "assured performance". M.R. Martinez from Cash Box described it as a "bumpin' cover". James Masterton for Dotmusic said, "Now it is the turn of Diana King's soft reggaefied version to crash into the charts, give [King] another hit and prolong the life of a quite brilliant pop song." Pan-European magazine Music & Media noted that the follow-up to 'Shy Guy' sees the Jamaican vocalist "lose some of [King's] rough dancehall edges in favour of a smoother R&B sound", adding that the chorus is "pure, uplifting modern soul."

A reviewer from Music Week rated it three out of five, writing, "A fairly standard cover of the Chaka Khan classic, with strong production. [King] might just convert some more fans." Dele Fadele from NME felt the atmosphere in Bob Marley's old Tuff Gong Studios, where 'Ain't Nobody' was recorded, was "sprinkling a little spiritual dust on an off-kilter rhythm that defies gravity and Diana's big ole show-off of a voice." Ralph Tee from the Record Mirror Dance Update stated, "'Shy Guy' turned out to be an international smash and this follow-up has similar crossover opportunities." In her positive review of Tougher Than Love, Siân Pattenden from Smash Hits wrote that "her version of ancient funkout 'Ain't Nobody' isn't half bad either."

=== Music video ===
A music video was produced to promote the single, directed by American film, television, commercial and music video director Kevin Bray. It features King performing with their band in a bright white room. Other scenes show the singer lying in an indoor pool with water. The video was later made available on King's official YouTube channel in 2009, and had generated more than 2,3 million views as of early 2024.

=== Track listings ===
CD single, UK (1995)
No.	Title	Length
1.	"Aint Nobody" (Radio Version)	3:44
2.	"Aint Nobody" (Album Version)	5:23
3.	"Aint Nobody" (David's Extended Club Mega Mix)
4.	"Medley (Love Triangle / Tougher Than Love / Tumble Down)"	3:27

CD maxi, Europe (1995)
No.	Title	Length
1.	"Aint Nobody" (LP Version Radio Edit)	3:44
2.	"Aint Nobody" (Low Down R&B Mix)	4:18
3.	"Aint Nobody" (David's Club Radio Mix)	4:02
4.	"Aint Nobody" (David's Extended Club Mega Mix)	10:31

=== Charts ===
==== Weekly charts ====
Weekly chart performance for Diana King version
Chart (1995)	Peak position
Belgium (Ultratop 50 Flanders)	48
Belgium (Ultratop 50 Wallonia)	25
Europe (Eurochart Hot 100)	35
Europe (European Dance Radio)	5
Europe (European Hit Radio)	30
France (SNEP)	41
Germany (GfK)	62
Iceland (Íslenski Listinn Topp 40)	28
Italy (Musica e dischi)	23
Netherlands (Dutch Top 40)	36
Netherlands (Single Top 100)	27
New Zealand (Recorded Music NZ)	28
Scotland (OCC)	30
Spain (AFYVE)	20
Sweden (Sverigetopplistan)	30
Switzerland (Schweizer Hitparade)	31
UK Singles (OCC)	13
UK R&B (OCC)	3
US Billboard Hot 100	94
US Dance Club Play (Billboard)	4
US Cash Box Top 100	47

==== Year-end charts ====
Year-end chart performance for Diana King version
Chart (1995)	Position
Europe (European Dance Radio)	17

== LL Cool J version ==
"Ain't Nobody"

Single by LL Cool J

from the album Beavis and Butt-Head Do America: Original Motion Picture Soundtrack
- B-side: "Come to Butt-head"
- Released: January 27, 1997
- Recorded: 1995
- Genre: Pop; hip-hop
- Length: 4:37
- Label: Geffen
- Songwriters: James Todd Smith; Hawk Wolinski
- Producers: Armando Colon; Rashad Smith; LL Cool J

LL Cool J singles chronology
"Hit 'Em High (The Monstars' Anthem)" (1996)	"Ain't Nobody" (1997)	"Phenomenon" (1997)

Music video
- LL Cool J – "Ain't Nobody" on YouTube

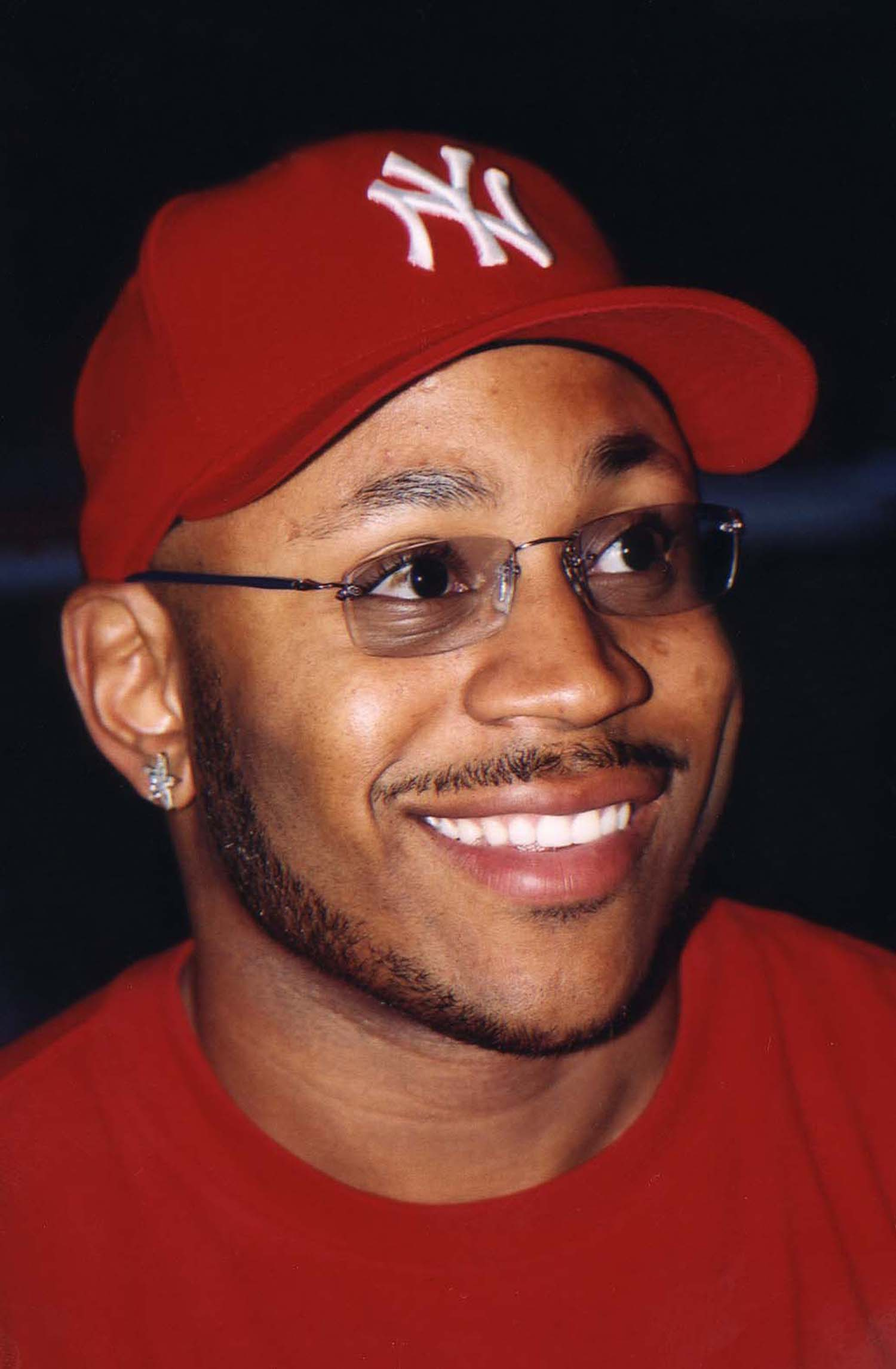
LL Cool J in 1999

Rapper LL Cool J recorded an interpolation of "Ain't Nobody" for the soundtrack to the 1996 film Beavis and Butt-Head Do America, based on the adult animated series Beavis and Butt-Head. Released by Geffen Records as the soundtrack's second single, the song peaked at number 46 on the US Billboard Hot 100, number four on the Hot Rap Singles Chart and number 27 on the Billboard Hot R&B Singles chart. Outside of the United States, the song topped the charts in the United Kingdom, where the song was also a hit for Gwen Dickey and KWS (reaching number 21), and The Course (number eight).

=== Critical reception ===
Larry Flick from Billboard described LL Cool J's version as a "pop juiced hip-hop ditty." He added, "The rap vet playfully unfurls his patented love-talk on top of an insinuating classic-funk bassline. The hip-grinding verses lead to a chantable chorus that re-creates the best portions of the timeless Rufus nugget [..]. Programmers starved for something sexy and immediately appealing need look no further." Alan Jones from Music Week felt that "LL Cool J's comeback with "Ain't Nobody" is more workmanlike than inspired, with all the lyrical dexterity we expect from him." He noted that "it includes an un-named femme who takes over to sing the chorus though this simply draws attention to what a good vocalist Chaka Khan is. A surefire hit, and quite a big one at that, though not one of LL's best."

=== Music video ===
The accompanying music video of this version, directed by Michael Martin, produced by Jonathan Heuer, and cinematography by Martin Coppen, was partially filmed at Mount Hood of Oregon. It also shows a pool party filled with guests, including Maia Campbell, Brian McKnight, Marlon Wayans, Shawn Wayans, Ricky Bell, Alfonso Ribeiro, Tichina Arnold, A.J. Johnson, Cedric the Entertainer, Martin Lawrence, Djimon Hounsou, Gerald Levert, Jermaine "Huggy" Hopkins, John Salley, Michael Taliferro and John Witherspoon.

=== Charts ===
Weekly chart performance for LL Cool J version
Chart (1997)	Peak position
Australia (ARIA)	60
Canada Dance/Urban (RPM)	23
Finland (Suomen virallinen lista)	18
Germany (GfK)	33
Ireland (IRMA)	12
Netherlands (Dutch Top 40)	20
Netherlands (Single Top 100)	30
New Zealand (Recorded Music NZ)	30
Scottish Singles Sales (Official Charts)	11
Sweden (Sverigetopplistan)	30
UK Singles (Official Charts)	1
UK Dance (Official Charts)	5
UK Hip Hop/R&B (Official Charts)	1
US Billboard Hot 100	46
US Hot R&B/Hip-Hop Songs (Billboard)	27
US Hot Rap Songs (Billboard)	4

=== Certifications ===
Certifications and sales for LL Cool J version
Region	Certification	Certified units/sales
United Kingdom (BPI)	Silver	200,000^{*}
^{*} Sales figures based on certification alone.

== Richard X vs. Liberty X version ==
"Being Nobody"

Single by Richard X vs. Liberty X

from the album Richard X Presents His X-Factor Vol. 1 / Being Somebody
- Released: March 17, 2003
- Genre: Pop
- Length: 3:40
- Label: Virgin
- Songwriters: Hawk Wolinski; Philip Oakey; Martyn Ware; Ian Craig Marsh
- Producer: Richard X

Richard X singles chronology
"Freak like Me" (2002)	"Being Nobody" (2003)	"Finest Dreams" (2003)

Liberty X singles chronology
"Holding On for You" (2002)	"Being Nobody" (2003)	"Jumpin" (2003)

In 2003, English-Irish pop group Liberty X released a version of the song titled "Being Nobody", produced by Richard X, as the lead single from Richard X's debut studio album, Richard X Presents His X-Factor Vol. 1 (2003), as well as the lead single from Liberty X's second studio album, Being Somebody (2003). The song is a pseudo-mashup, taking the lyrics of "Ain't Nobody" and placing them over an instrumental interpolation of the Human League's "Being Boiled". Additional elements from both songs were also used such as the recurring synth line from "Ain't Nobody" and the line "OK, ready? Let's do it." in the intro of the main mix are from the intro of "Being Boiled".

Liberty X first performed "Being Nobody" on Ant & Dec's Saturday Night Takeaway on February 8, 2003. They also performed it twice on Top of the Pops, with other performances on The National Lottery Wright Ticket and CD:UK before officially released on March 17, 2003. Shortly after that, the 2003 remastered version of the original 1983 hit "Ain't Nobody" was released in April of that year.

=== Critical reception ===
The song received mostly positive reviews from music critics. It was deemed "instantly memorable" by RTÉ.ie reviewer Linda McGee, whilst Louis Pattison of NME believed it was "Truly, a record to get over-excited about." Alexis Kirke of musicOMH said: "The marriage of the credible dance-bootleg production of Richard X with high profile pop-act Liberty X is not only a perfect career-expanding synergy for both, but also a powerful musical synergy in which the seventies meets the eighties during the noughties." Writing for ukmix.org, Martin P gave the song five stars out of five and called it "It's pure pop perfection with a twist of R&B – one of the best Liberty X singles!"

=== Track listing ===
1. "Being Nobody" (Main Mix) – 3:37
2. "Being Nobody" (Richard X Remix) – 4:25
3. "Being Nobody" (X-Strumental) – 3:38

=== Charts ===
==== Weekly charts ====
Weekly chart performance for Richard X vs. Liberty X version
Chart (2003)	Peak position
Australia (ARIA)	36
Belgium (Ultratop 50 Flanders)	26
Europe (Eurochart Hot 100)	15
France (SNEP)	88
Germany (GfK)	79
Ireland (IRMA)	9
Ireland Dance (IRMA)	1
Netherlands (Dutch Top 40)	37
Netherlands (Single Top 100)	50
New Zealand (Recorded Music NZ)	49
Romania (Romanian Top 100)	30
Scottish Singles Sales (Official Charts)	2
UK Singles (Official Charts)	3
UK Dance (Official Charts)	4

==== Year-end charts ====
Year-end chart performance for Richard X vs. Liberty X version
Chart (2003)	Position
Ireland (IRMA)	92
UK Singles (OCC)	52

== Scooter version ==
"It's a Biz (Ain't Nobody)"

Single by Scooter

from the album The Big Mash Up
- Released: March 23, 2012
- Length: 3:21
- Label: Sheffield Tunes
- Songwriter: David "Hawk" Wolinski
- Producer: Scooter

Scooter singles chronology
"C'est Bleu" (2011)	"It's a Biz (Ain't Nobody)" (2012)	"4 AM" (2012)

Music video
- "It's a Biz (Ain't Nobody)" on YouTube

"It's a Biz (Ain't Nobody)" is a single by German hard dance band Scooter. It was released on March 23, 2012, as the fifth single from their fifteenth studio album, The Big Mash Up (2011).

=== Track listings ===
CD single (2-track)
No.	Title	Length
1.	"It's a Biz (Ain't Nobody)" (The Big Mash Up Tour 2012 Edit)	3:21
2.	"It's a Biz (Ain't Nobody)" (Club Mix)	5:40

Download
No.	Title	Length
1.	"It's a Biz (Ain't Nobody)" (The Big Mash Up Tour 2012 Edit)	3:21
2.	"It's a Biz (Ain't Nobody)" (Club Mix)	5:40
3.	"It's a Biz (Ain't Nobody)" (Extended)	5:40

=== Charts ===
Weekly chart performance for "It's a Biz (Ain't Nobody)"
Chart (2012)	Peak position
Germany (GfK)	79

== Felix Jaehn version ==
"Ain't Nobody (Loves Me Better)"

Single by Felix Jaehn featuring Jasmine Thompson

from the album I
- B-side: "I Do"
- Released: April 3, 2015
- Length: 4:01
- Label: Polydor; Island
- Songwriter: Hawk Wolinski
- Producer: Felix Jaehn

Felix Jaehn singles chronology
"Dance with Me" (2015)	"Ain't Nobody (Loves Me Better)" (2015)	"Eagle Eyes" (2015)

Jasmine Thompson singles chronology
"Sun Goes Down" (2014)	"Ain't Nobody (Loves Me Better)" (2015)	"Unfinished Sympathy" (2015)

Music video
- "Ain't Nobody (Loves Me Better)" on YouTube

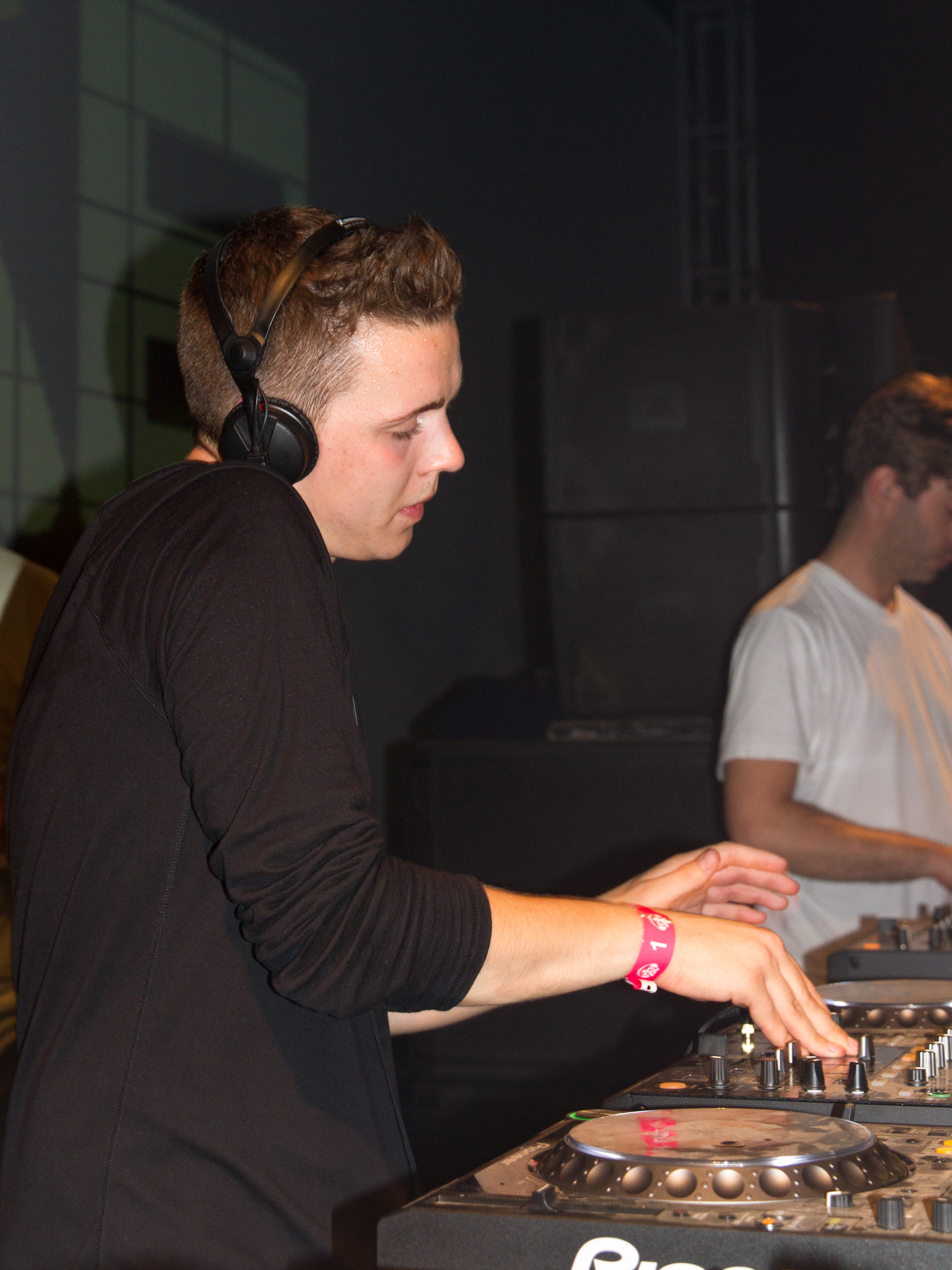
Felix Jaehn

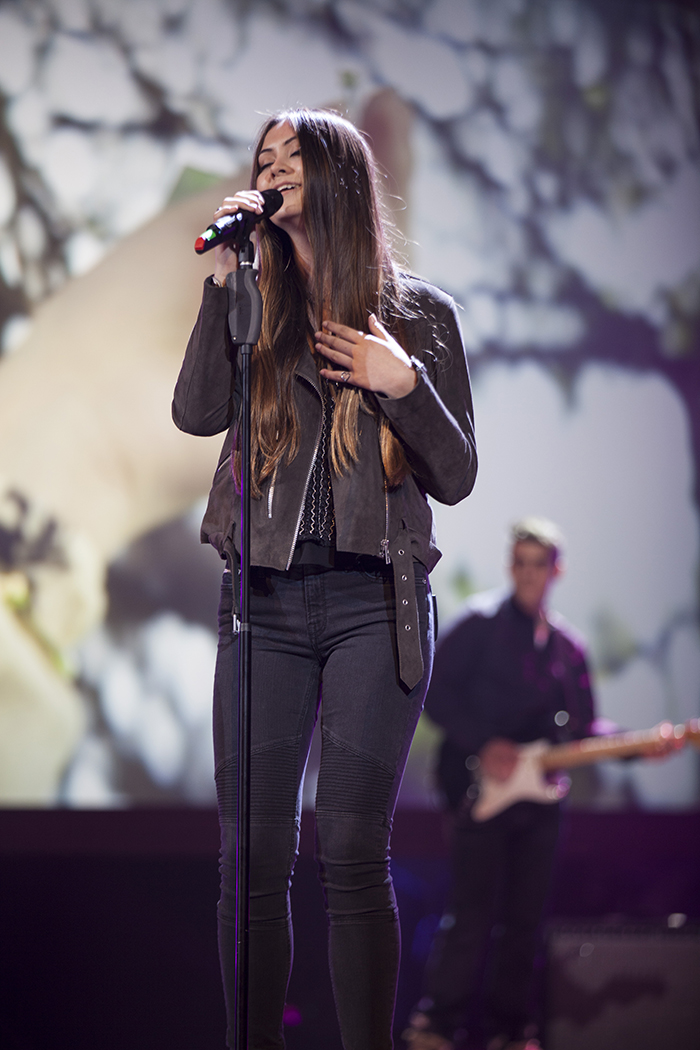
Jasmine Thompson

In 2015, German music producer and DJ Felix Jaehn released a remix titled "Ain't Nobody (Loves Me Better)" featuring vocals by British singer Jasmine Thompson. It is the lead single for Jaehn's eponymous 2016 debut EP, Felix Jaehn. The remix was based on a solo release of the song by Thompson in 2013, when Thompson was 13, which had peaked at number 32 on the UK Singles Chart. However, the Felix Jaehn remix became a far bigger international chart success, peaking at number one or two in a number of European countries (including number two in the United Kingdom) as well as the top 10 in other European countries and Australia.

=== Track listing ===
1. "Ain't Nobody (Loves Me Better)" (Felix Jaehn featuring Jasmine Thompson) – 3:01
2. "I Do" (Felix Jaehn featuring Poppy Haddigan) – 3:02

=== Charts ===
==== Weekly charts ====
Weekly chart performance for Felix Jaehn remix
Chart (2015–2018)	Peak position
Australia (ARIA)	6
Austria (Ö3 Austria Top 40)	1
Belarus Airplay (Eurofest)	87
Belgium (Ultratop 50 Flanders)	6
Belgium (Ultratop 50 Wallonia)	7
Canada Hot 100 (Billboard)	95
Czech Republic Airplay (ČNS IFPI)	1
Czech Republic Singles Digital (ČNS IFPI)	4
Denmark (Tracklisten)	2
Euro Digital Song Sales (Billboard)	2
Finland (Suomen virallinen lista)	10
Finland Airplay (Radiosoittolista)	3
France (SNEP)	2
Germany (GfK)	1
Hungary (Dance Top 40)	3
Hungary (Rádiós Top 40)	1
Hungary (Single Top 40)	1
Hungary (Stream Top 40)	2
Ireland (IRMA)	5
Israel International Airplay (Media Forest)	1
Italy (FIMI)	22
Netherlands (Dutch Top 40)	1
Netherlands (Single Top 100)	2
New Zealand (Recorded Music NZ)	21
Norway (VG-lista)	13
Poland Airplay (ZPAV)	1
Romania (Airplay 100)	1
Romania Airplay (Media Forest)	1
Romania TV Airplay (Media Forest)	1
Russia Airplay (Tophit)	1
Scottish Singles Sales (Official Charts)	2
Slovakia Airplay (ČNS IFPI)	3
Slovakia Singles Digital (ČNS IFPI)	3
Slovenia (SloTop50)	1
South Africa Airplay (EMA)	4
Spain (Promusicae)	4
Sweden (Sverigetopplistan)	7
Switzerland (Schweizer Hitparade)	5
UK Singles (Official Charts)	2
US Dance Club Songs (Billboard)	50
US Hot Dance/Electronic Songs (Billboard)	11

==== Year-end charts ====
Year-end chart performance for Felix Jaehn remix
Chart (2015)	Position
Australia (ARIA)	86
Austria (Ö3 Austria Top 40)	9
Belgium (Ultratop Flanders)	17
Belgium (Ultratop Wallonia)	23
CIS (Tophit)	8
France (SNEP)	13
Germany (Official German Charts)	3
Hungary (Dance Top 40)	22
Hungary (Rádiós Top 40)	8
Hungary (Single Top 40)	15
Israel (Media Forest)	13
Italy (FIMI)	49
Netherlands (Dutch Top 40)	3
Netherlands (Single Top 100)	4
Poland (ZPAV)	4
Russia Airplay (Tophit)	9
Spain (PROMUSICAE)	28
Sweden (Sverigetopplistan)	22
Switzerland (Schweizer Hitparade)	12
UK Singles (OCC)	62
Ukraine Airplay (Tophit)	35
US Hot Dance/Electronic Songs (Billboard)	33

Chart (2016)	Position
France (SNEP)	117
Hungary (Dance Top 40)	15
Spain (PROMUSICAE)	97

Chart (2022)	Position
Hungary (Rádiós Top 40)	69

==== Decade-end charts ====
Decade-end chart performance for Felix Jaehn remix
Chart (2010–2019)	Position
Austria (Ö3 Austria Top 40)	98
Germany (Official German Charts)	30

=== Certifications ===
Certifications and sales for Felix Jaehn remix
Region	Certification	Certified units/sales
Australia (ARIA)	3× Platinum	210,000^{‡}
Austria (IFPI Austria)	2× Platinum	60,000^{‡}
Belgium (BRMA)	Platinum	20,000^{‡}
Brazil (Pro-Música Brasil)	2× Platinum	120,000^{‡}
Canada (Music Canada)	2× Platinum	160,000^{‡}
Denmark (IFPI Danmark)	3× Platinum	270,000^{‡}
France (SNEP)	Gold	75,000^{*}
Germany (BVMI)	Diamond	1,000,000^{‡}
Italy (FIMI)	3× Platinum	150,000^{‡}
Mexico (AMPROFON)	Gold	30,000^{*}
Netherlands (NVPI)	5× Platinum	150,000^{‡}
New Zealand (RMNZ)	Platinum	15,000^{*}
Poland (ZPAV)	4× Platinum	80,000^{‡}
Spain (Promusicae)	2× Platinum	80,000^{‡}
Sweden (GLF)	5× Platinum	200,000^{‡}
Switzerland (IFPI Switzerland)	Platinum	30,000^{‡}
United Kingdom (BPI)	Platinum	600,000^{‡}
United States (RIAA)	Gold	500,000^{‡}
^{*} Sales figures based on certification alone.^{‡} Sales+streaming figures based on certification alone.

== See also ==
- List of Airplay 100 number ones of the 2010s
- List of number-one R&B singles of 1983 (U.S.)
- List of UK top 10 singles in 1984
- List of UK top 10 singles in 1989
- List of number-one dance singles of 1994 (U.S.)
- List of UK Singles Chart number ones of 1997
- List of UK top 10 singles in 2015
- Mashup (music)
- Of the Night – by Bastille
- Rhythm Is a Dancer
- The Rhythm of the Night
