= Respectable =

Respectable may refer to:

- Having significant social status
- "Respectable" (Rolling Stones song), 1978 single
- "Respectable" (Mel and Kim song), 1987 single
- "Respectable", a 1960 single by The Isley Brothers, a 1965 album cover by The Yardbirds on Having a Rave Up with the Yardbirds, and a 1966 cover by The Outsiders
- "Respectable", a song by Don McLean from the album Tapestry
- Respectable (TV series), set in a brothel, broadcast by Five in the UK in 2006

== See also ==
- Respect (disambiguation)
