= Think Like a Girl =

Studio album by Diana King
- Released: September 30, 1997
- Length: 50:19
- Label: Work
- Producer: Andy Marvel

Diana King chronology
| Tougher Than Love (1995) | Think Like a Girl (1997) | Respect (2002) |

Singles from Think Like a Girl
- 1. "I Say a Little Prayer" Released: 1997; 2. "L-L-Lies" Released: 1997; 3. "Find My Way Back" Released: 1998; 4. "Supa-Lova-Bwoy" Released: 1998

Think Like a Girl is the second studio album by Jamaican singer-songwriter Diana King. It was released by the Work Group on September 30, 1997. The album debuted and peaked at number one on the US Billboard Top Reggae Albums chart. The album produced several singles, including "L-L-Lies", "Find My Way Back" and the Dionne Warwick cover "I Say a Little Prayer".

== Critical reception ==
Professional ratings
Review scores
| Source | Rating |
|---|---|
| AllMusic | 3/5 stars |

Jose F. Promis from AllMusic called Think Like a Girl a "well-crafted, diverse set of soul/pop/reggae that merited much more attention it received. The album contains several ultra catchy songs that have hit written all over them, namely the infectious title track and "Wicked" [...] Think Like a Girl does tend to wane towards the end, but, overall, this is a surprisingly well-crafted and engaging set, and only hints at what is to come for the talented and extremely photogenic Diana King."

== Commercial performance ==
Think Like a Girl reached number one on the US Billboard Top Reggae Albums chart. In Japan, it peaked at number seven on the Japanese Albums Chart and was eventually certified Platinum by the Recording Industry Association of Japan (RIAJ).

== Track listing ==
Think Like a Girl track listing
| No. | Title | Writer(s) | Length |
|---|---|---|---|
| 1. | "Think Like a Girl" | Andy Marvel; Billy Mann; Diana King | 3:04 |
| 2. | "L-L-Lies" | Marvel; Arnie Roman; King | 4:08 |
| 3. | "Do You Really Want to Hurt Me?" | Boy George; Jon Moss; Michael Craig; Roy Hay | 5:06 |
| 4. | "Love Yourself" | Marvel; Mann; King | 4:43 |
| 5. | "Find My Way Back" | Marvel; King | 4:08 |
| 6. | "Mi Coffee" | | 0:31 |
| 7. | "Sweeter" | Marvel; King; Handel Tucker | 4:06 |
| 8. | "Super-Lova-Bwoy" | Marvel; King; Gary Benson; H. Tucker | 3:56 |
| 9. | "Tenderness" | Marvel; King | 4:18 |
| 10. | "New Galfriend" | Marvel; King; Junior Tucker | 4:53 |
| 11. | "Wicked" | Marvel; King | 4:16 |
| 12. | "Still" | Marvel; King; H. Tucker | 3:34 |
| 13. | "I Say a Little Prayer" | Burt Bacharach; Hal David | 3:31 |
| Total length: | | | 50:19 |

== Charts ==
Weekly chart performance for Think Like a Girl
| Chart (1997) | Peak position |
|---|---|
| Japanese Albums (Oricon) | 7 |
| Swiss Albums (Schweizer Hitparade) | 44 |
| US Reggae Albums (Billboard) | 1 |

== Certifications ==
Certifications for Think Like a Girl
| Region | Certification | Certified units/sales |
|---|---|---|
| Japan (RIAJ) | Platinum | 200,000^{^} |
^{^} Shipments figures based on certification alone.
