= Shy Guy =

1995 single by Diana King

- Artwork for European release

Single by Diana King

from the album Tougher Than Love and Bad Boys: Music from the Motion Picture
- Released: 13 March 1995
- Genre: Reggae fusion; dancehall
- Length: 4:20 (album version); 3:40 (single version)
- Label: Work
- Songwriters: Diana King; Andy Marvel; Kingsley Gardner
- Producer: Andy Marvel

Diana King singles chronology
"Stir It Up" (1994)	"Shy Guy" (1995)	"Ain't Nobody" (1995)

Music videos
- "Shy Guy" on YouTube; "Shy Guy" (Bad Boys version) on YouTube

"Shy Guy" is a song by the Jamaican singer Diana King, recorded for the film soundtrack album Bad Boys. It also appeared on King's debut studio album, Tougher Than Love (1995). The song was written by King, Kingsley Gardner and Andy Marvel, and produced by Marvel. It was released in March 1995 by label Work as the lead single from Tougher Than Love. The song contains a sample from "School Boy Crush" by Average White Band. The chorus line "Lord have mercy, mercy, mercy" is derived from lines in Charlie Chaplin's 1989 dancehall song "Cool the Violence".

The song received positive reviews from music critics, with many saying it was a highlight of the album and calling it one of the best reggae fusion songs of its time. AllMusic said the song was a highlight of both the soundtrack and King's debut album. "Shy Guy" also received chart success. The song peaked at number thirteen in the United States and went to number two in the United Kingdom. It topped the charts in Finland, Sweden and Zimbabwe and became a top-five hit in several other countries, including Australia, Ireland, the Netherlands, New Zealand and Norway. Two music videos were produced, directed by Marcus Nispel and Michael Bay.

== Critical reception ==
J.R. Reynolds from Billboard magazine wrote, "The catchy leadoff single 'Shy Guy' blends steady reggae beats with a funky and infectious hip-hop rhythm track." Devon Jackson from Entertainment Weekly named it a standout on the Bad Boys soundtrack, complimenting it as "a seamless merging of Anita Baker and dancehall reggae." Dave Sholin from the Gavin Report stated that King's artistry "will be discovered by the masses who hear this song via the airwaves and the soundtrack of the new Will Smith and Martin Lawrence film, Bad Boys. Hot tune, hot movie and a lot of airplay—that'll work!"

Bianca Gracie from Idolator ranked it one of the 50 Best Pop Singles of 1995, noting that "the breezy mid-tempo dance tune features sassy lyrics that are peppered with patois inflections that urge women everywhere to realize they deserve more than what these f*ck boys are offering." A reviewer from Music & Media said that "Miss [Mx] King provides prospect for the no-hopers. Move over fly guys, Diana wants a shy guy. Within the context of a mix of ragga and swingbeat, she joyfully sings and raps about the timid type." Stephen Meade from The Network Forty wrote that "reggae flava with ultra-smooth vocals lead us to a hook we can't forget." Rune Slyngstad from Norwegian Nordlandsposten described the song as "pulsating and catchy".

== Chart performance ==
"Shy Guy" was released as the lead single on both King's album and the soundtrack of Bad Boys. The song received charting success worldwide. The song debuted at number thirty-five on the Australian Singles Chart and later peaked at number three, staying at the position for three consecutive weeks. The song later debuted at number twenty-eight on the New Zealand Singles Chart. After seventeen weeks, it peaked at number three for one week. The song peaked at number thirteen on the US Billboard Hot 100 and number twenty-one on the Billboard Hot R&B Singles chart. It was certified gold by the Recording Industry Association of America (RIAA), selling over 500,000 copies in the US.

"Shy Guy" debuted at number six on the Swiss Singles Chart, then peaked at number five for three consecutive weeks. It debuted at number thirty on the Austrian Singles Chart, and rose to number six for one week. The song later debuted at number twenty-seven on the French Singles Chart and rose to peak at number four, staying there for two consecutive weeks. The song was certified silver in France, selling over 125,000 copies there. The song reached number one on two charts. It debuted at number twenty-seven in Sweden before rising to number one for one week, while in Finland, the song remained at number one for four non-consecutive weeks. It also peaked at number two in Norway, staying there for seven consecutive weeks. The song debuted at number four on the UK singles chart, then peaked at number two. It was certified silver in the United Kingdom.

== Music videos ==
Two music videos were produced for "Shy Guy"; one in black and white, directed by German film director and producer Marcus Nispel, for the Tougher Than Love album; the other, directed by American film director and producer Michael Bay, for the Bad Boys soundtrack with Will Smith and Martin Lawrence appearing in it. That video features King dancing and singing to the song in a very cold-looking environment, but through the chorus they are seen dancing on a runway looking stage. At the 1995 Billboard Music Video Awards, "Shy Guy" was nominated for two awards in the category for R&B/Urban; Best Clip and Best New Artist Clip.

== Track listings ==
- CD single
1. "Shy Guy" (radio edit) — 3:39
2. "Shy Guy" (Darpe mix) — 3:41
- 7-inch single
1. "Shy Guy" (radio edit) — 3:39
2. "Shy Guy" (Darpe mix) — 3:41
- CD maxi and 12-inch single
1. "Shy Guy" (radio edit) — 3:39
2. "Shy Guy" (Darpe mix) — 3:41
3. "Shy Guy" (RandB mix) — 3:36
4. "Shy Guy" (dancehall mix) — 5:00
5. "Shy Guy" (dancehall dub) — 4:54

== Charts ==
=== Weekly charts ===
Chart (1995)	Peak position
Australia (ARIA)	3
Austria (Ö3 Austria Top 40)	6
Belgium (Ultratop 50 Flanders)	5
Belgium (Ultratop 50 Wallonia)	2
Canada Top Singles (RPM)	39
Canada Dance/Urban (RPM)	20
Denmark (IFPI)	2
Europe (Eurochart Hot 100)	1
Europe (European Dance Radio)	1
Europe (European Hit Radio)	1
Finland (Suomen virallinen lista)	1
France (SNEP)	4
Germany (GfK)	6
Hungary (Mahasz)	5
Iceland (Íslenski Listinn Topp 40)	8
Ireland (IRMA)	4
Israel (Israeli Singles Chart)	6
Italy (Musica e dischi)	10
Italy Airplay (Music & Media)	1
Netherlands (Dutch Top 40)	2
Netherlands (Single Top 100)	3
New Zealand (Recorded Music NZ)	3
Norway (VG-lista)	2
Scottish Singles Sales (Official Charts)	11
Sweden (Sverigetopplistan)	1
Switzerland (Schweizer Hitparade)	5
UK Singles (Official Charts)	2
UK Dance (Official Charts)	7
UK Hip Hop/R&B (Official Charts)	1
UK Airplay (Music Week)	3
US Billboard Hot 100	13
US Dance Singles Sales (Billboard)	20
US Hot R&B/Hip-Hop Songs (Billboard)	21
US Pop Airplay (Billboard)	15
US Rhythmic Airplay (Billboard)	8
US Cash Box Top 100	11
Zimbabwe (ZIMA)	1

=== Year-end charts ===
Chart (1995)	Position
Australia (ARIA)	25
Belgium (Ultratop 50 Flanders)	52
Belgium (Ultratop 50 Wallonia)	12
Europe (Eurochart Hot 100)	12
Europe (European Dance Radio)	2
Europe (European Hit Radio)	3
France (SNEP)	14
Germany (Media Control)	31
Iceland (Íslenski Listinn Topp 40)	74
Israel (Israeli Singles Chart)	23
Latvia (Latvijas Top 50)	28
Netherlands (Dutch Top 40)	17
Netherlands (Single Top 100)	35
New Zealand (RIANZ)	10
Sweden (Topplistan)	15
Switzerland (Schweizer Hitparade)	23
UK Singles (OCC)	25
UK Airplay (Music Week)	29
US Billboard Hot 100	43
US Hot R&B Singles (Billboard)	73

== Certifications ==
Region	Certification	Certified units/sales
Australia (ARIA)	Platinum	70,000^{^}
Belgium (BRMA)	Gold	25,000^{*}
France (SNEP)	Gold	250,000^{*}
Germany (BVMI)	Gold	250,000^{^}
New Zealand (RMNZ) Physical sales	Gold	5,000^{*}
New Zealand (RMNZ) Digital sales + streaming	Gold	15,000^{‡}
United Kingdom (BPI)	Platinum	600,000^{‡}
United States (RIAA)	Gold	500,000^{^}
^{*} Sales figures based on certification alone.^{^} Shipments figures based on certification alone.^{‡} Sales+streaming figures based on certification alone.

== Release history ==
Region	Date	Format(s)	Label(s)	Ref.
Australia	13 March 1995	CD; cassette	Chaos	
Europe	14 March 1995	CD	Work	
Japan	21 July 1995	Mini-CD	Sony	

== Covers and samples ==
In 1998, a cover version of the song called Jeito Sexy became the first hit of Brazilian band Fat Family.

Aswad and former Eternal singer Easther Bennett recorded a version of the song in 2002.

In December 2008, Mýa recorded a cover version of "Shy Guy" with the words in English rather than in the patois that King's version was recorded in. This was included on Mýa's 2008 Japan-only album Sugar & Spice but was not released as a single.

In 2016, Belgian singer Unicq released her own bilingual French / English version under the title "Mercy (Shy Guy)". The single reached number 76 on the SNEP chart, the French official singles chart.

The chorus of the 2016 song "Don't Hurt Me" by DJ Mustard and Nicki Minaj contains an interpolation of "Shy Guy".
