= Tougher Than Love =

Studio album by Diana King
- Released: April 25, 1995
- Length: 46:26
- Label: Work
- Producer: Mikey Bennett; Clement "Coxsone" Dodd; Andy Marvel; Sugar Minott; Matt Noble; Handel Tucker

Diana King chronology
Tougher Than Love (1995)	Think Like a Girl (1997)

Tougher Than Love is the debut studio album by Jamaican-American singer-songwriter Diana King. It was released by the Work Group on April 25, 1995. The album reached the top ten in Finland, Japan, and Norway as well as on the UK R&B Albums and on the US Top Reggae Albums chart. Tougher Than Love produced four singles, including "Shy Guy", "Love Triangle", "Treat Her Like a Lady" and "Ain't Nobody", a cover of the Rufus & Chaka Khan song from 1983.

== Critical reception ==
Professional ratings
Review scores
Source	Rating
AllMusic	2/5 stars
Music Week	3/5 stars
Smash Hits	4/5 stars

Music & Media wrote about that album: "You can only do that properly if your singing is as good as your rapping. Diana succeeds cum laude on both disciplines. As a vocalist she's reminiscent of Anita Baker, as a rapper Patra is the best reference. With the catchy tracks [...] King deserves to be crowned queen of the innovation." A reviewer from British magazine Music Week wrote, "A fitting title adorns this strongly reggae/dancehall-influenced album which amply showcases King as an unusual [female] talent, who is most impressive when she [they] sing[s] it straight and soulful."

Billboard editors Paul Verna and Marilyn A. Gillen noted that "despite her youth, Jamaican artist's full-bodied vocals demonstrate a tenured versatility that balances the memorable hooks and car-catching choruses that could have easily allowed this debut to become merely a production-driven vehicle. Syncopated Jamaican shythms and patois, though far from center stage, maintain album's semi-exotc appeal. Excellent crossover potential." Cash Box found that there was "deep new-jack funk sensibilities on King's debut here. She [...] offers a collection here that is expertly produced and fits right in to the urban music landscape. Mixing chant and song deftly, she wins with tracks like “Love Triangle," "Love Me Thru The Night" and the bumpin’ cover of Chaka's "Ain't Nobody"." AllMusic rated the album two ouf of five stars.

== Commercial performance ==
In the United States, the album peaked at number 179 on the US Billboard 200, number 85 on the Top R&B/Hip-Hop Albums chart and number three on the Top Reggae Albums chart. Elsewhere, it reached the top ten in Finland, Japan, Norway, and on the UK R&B Albums chart.

== Track listing ==
Tougher Than Love track listing
No.	Title	Writer(s)	Producer(s)	Length
1.	"Love Me Thru the Night"	Diana King; Handel Tucker	Tucker	5:18
2.	"Shy Guy"	King; Andy Marvel; Kingsley Gardner	Marvel	4:19
3.	"Love Triangle"	King; Marvel; Billy Mann	Marvel	4:22
4.	"Ain't Nobody"	Hawk Wolinski	Tucker	5:23
5.	"Tougher Than Love"	King; Marvel; Marlon Graves	Marvel	3:50
6.	"Can't Do Without You"	King; Marvel	Marvel	5:01
7.	"Slow Rush"	King; Matt Noble	Noble; Tucker^{[a]}	4:56
8.	"Treat Her Like a Lady"	King; Marvel; Billy Mann	Marvel	3:55
9.	"Black Roses"	King; Noble	Noble	5:06
10.	"Tumble Down"	King; Marvel	Marvel	4:18
Total length:				46:26

European bonus track
No.	Title	Writer(s)	Producer(s)	Length
11.	"Lock Him Up"	Clement "Coxsone" Dodd; Sugar Minott	Dodd; Minott	4:36

Special edition bonus tracks
No.	Title	Writer(s)	Producer(s)	Length
11.	"Hey Jude"	Lennon–McCartney	Marvel	5:51
12.	"Lock Him Up"	King; Mikey Bennett; Peter Gayle	Bennett	4:13
13.	"I'll Do It" (with Nahki)	King; Marvel; Naoki Yamaguchi	Marvel	3:55

Notes

- ^{^[a]} denotes additional producer(s)

Sample credits

- "Shy Guy" contain replayed samples from "School Boy Crush" as performed by Average White Band.

== Charts ==
Chart performance for Tougher Than Love
Chart (1995)	Peak position
Australian Albums (ARIA)	33
Austrian Albums (Ö3 Austria)	28
Belgian Albums (Ultratop Wallonia)	39
Dutch Albums (Album Top 100)	28
Finnish Albums (Suomen virallinen lista)	9
German Albums (Offizielle Top 100)	28
Japanese Albums (Oricon)	5
Norwegian Albums (VG-lista)	6
Swedish Albums (Sverigetopplistan)	40
Swiss Albums (Schweizer Hitparade)	29
UK Albums (OCC)	50
UK R&B Albums (OCC)	8
US Billboard 200	179
US Reggae Albums (Billboard)	3
US Top R&B/Hip-Hop Albums (Billboard)	85

== Certifications ==
Certifications for Tougher Than Love
Region	Certification	Certified units/sales
Japan (RIAJ)	3× Platinum	600,000^{^}
Norway (IFPI Norway)	Gold	25,000^{*}
^{*} Sales figures based on certification alone.^{^} Shipments figures based on certification alone.
