= David Doesn't Eat =

2011 song by Scooter

Single by Scooter

from the album The Big Mash Up
- Released: 14 October 2011
- Recorded: 2011
- Studio: Sheffield Underground Studios
- Genre: Dubstep
- Length: 3:39
- Label: Sheffield Tunes
- Songwriter(s): Nicholas Charles Bailey; H.P. Baxxter; Rick J. Jordan; Michael Simon; Jens Thele
- Producer(s): Scooter

Scooter singles chronology
| "The Only One" (2011) | "David Doesn't Eat" (2011) | "C'est Bleu" (2011) |

Music video
- "David Doesn't Eat" on YouTube

"David Doesn't Eat" is a single by German hard dance band Scooter. It was released on 14 October 2011 as the third single from their fifteenth studio album The Big Mash Up. The song samples "A Walk in the Park" by Nick Straker Band.

== Track listing ==
CD single (2-track) / Download
| No. | Title | Length |
|---|---|---|
| 1. | "David Doesn't Eat" (radio edit) | 3:39 |
| 2. | "David Doesn't Eat" (Eric Chase Remix) | 5:24 |

Other official versions

There is a shortened version of "David Doesn't Eat" (Eric Chase Remix) – 2:42 released on various artists' compilation, titled Kontor House of House, Volume 13 on physical media or Kontor House Of House - Winter Edition 2012 as digital download.

== Credits and personnel ==
Credits adapted from "David Doesn't Eat" CD single liner notes.

Musicians and production

- H.P. Baxxter a.k.a. 'MC No 1' – MC lyrics, producer, performer, programmer
- Rick J. Jordan – mixer, engineer, producer, performer, programmer
- Michael Simon – mixer, engineer, producer, performer, programmer
- Achim Jannsen – mixer, engineer

Packaging

- Martin Weiland – artwork
- Michaela Kuhn (Licht Form Arte) – photography

== Chart performance ==
Chart performance for "David Doesn't Eat"
| Chart (2011) | Peak position |
|---|---|
| Germany (GfK) | 67 |
