= Live City Sounds =

Live album by Mary Lou Lord
- Released: 2001
- Recorded: 2000
- Venue: Park Street station, Boston; Harvard Square
- Genre: Indie folk
- Label: Rubric

Mary Lou Lord chronology
| Got No Shadow (1998) | Live City Sounds (2001) | Baby Blue (2004) |

Live City Sounds is a live album by the American musician Mary Lou Lord, released in 2001. It was a return to Lord's busking roots.

The album was originally sold via mail, before being reissued by Rubric Records.

== Production ==
The album includes covers of songs by Richard Thompson, Big Star, the Magnetic Fields, and Bob Dylan, among others. Lord recorded the album on a newly purchased portable DAT recorder, which she returned within 30 days for a refund. The songs were captured at Park Street station, in Boston, and at Harvard Square. A studio recording of "Speeding Motorcycle", a cover of the Daniel Johnston song, was included on the reissue.

== Critical reception ==
Professional ratings
Review scores
| Source | Rating |
|---|---|
| AllMusic | 4/5 stars |
| The Encyclopedia of Popular Music | 4/5 stars |
| Entertainment Weekly | B+ |
| (The New) Rolling Stone Album Guide | 3/5 stars |

No Depression wrote that "Lord proves a particularly strong interpreter of Richard Thompson’s work, jangling through '1952 Vincent Black Lightning' and delicately rendering 'Beeswing'." Entertainment Weekly noted that the highlights include "a pair of motorcycle odes by Richard Thompson and Daniel Johnston, and a languid take on Springsteen's 'Thunder Road' that recasts it as the daydream it probably always was."

Trouser Press declared that "the performances, unembellished and heartfelt, are perfect." The Boston Globe thought that "her imitations feel more like tributes than ripoffs." The Chicago Tribune determined that the album "finds Lord's warm, waif-ish voice most moving on ballads but stretched on less sedate material."

AllMusic wrote: "As a whole, this disc serves as a startling reemergence of Mary Lou Lord onto the indie folk rock scene. With more than her share of negative press from detractors, Lord lets the music speak for her. The music remains charming, simple, and powerful." The Encyclopedia of Popular Music concluded that Live City Sounds "outshone her studio work."

== Track listing ==
| No. | Title | Length |
|---|---|---|
| 1. | "I Don't Want to Get Over You" |
| 2. | "She Had You" |
| 3. | "Thirteen" |
| 4. | "Vincent 52" |
| 5. | "Not Half Right" |
| 6. | "She's Still Bewitching Me" |
| 7. | "Ontario, Quebec and Me" |
| 8. | "His Lamest Flame" |
| 9. | "Beeswing" |
| 10. | "Thunder Road" |
| 11. | "By the Time It Gets Dark" |
| 12. | "Sayonara" |
| 13. | "Ricochet in Time" |
| 14. | "Own Worst Enemy" |
| 15. | "Lonesome When You Go" |
