= The Big Mash Up =

Studio album by Scooter
- Released: 14 October 2011
- Recorded: 2011
- Studios: Sheffield Underground Studios (Hamburg, Germany)
- Genres: Dubstep; jumpstyle; techno; EDM
- Length: 59:39
- Label: Sheffield Tunes
- Producers: H.P. Baxxter; Rick J. Jordan; Michael Simon; Jens Thele

Scooter chronology
The Stadium Techno Inferno (2011)	The Big Mash Up (2011)	Music for a Big Night Out (2012)

Singles from The Big Mash Up
- 1. "Friends Turbo" Released: 15 April 2011; 2. "The Only One" Released: 20 May 2011; 3. "David Doesn't Eat" Released: 14 October 2011; 4. "C'est Bleu" Released: 2 December 2011; 5. "It's a Biz (Ain't Nobody)" Released: 23 March 2012

The Big Mash Up is the fifteenth studio album from German electronic dance music band Scooter and was released on 14 October 2011. The album was preceded by the single "Friends Turbo" released on 15 April 2011, the second single "The Only One", released on 20 May 2011, a third single, "David Doesn't Eat", released on the same day as the album itself. The fourth single, "C'est Bleu" featuring Vicky Leandros, was released on 2 December 2011. On 23 March 2012 a new version of "It's a Biz (Ain't Nobody)" was released as the fifth single.

== Reception ==
Professional ratings
Review scores
Source	Rating
Random.Access	7.5/10

The album is heavily influenced by dubstep and differs from previous band usual styles. The new style received mixed reception from Scooter fans.

== Track listing ==
=== CD1 ===
No.	Title	Writer(s)	Length
1.	"C.I.F.L."	H.P. Baxxter; Rick J. Jordan; Michael Simon; Jens Thele	0:49
2.	"David Doesn't Eat"	Nicholas Charles Bailey; Baxxter; Jordan; Simon; Thele	3:38
3.	"Dreams"	Vladimir Cosma	3:12
4.	"Beyond the Invisible"	Michael Cretu; David Fairstein	3:35
5.	"Sugary Dip"	Baxxter; Jordan; Simon; Thele; Chris Avantgarde	3:26
6.	"It's a Biz (Ain't Nobody)"	David Wolinski	4:46
7.	"C'est Bleu (feat. Vicky Leandros)"	André Charles Jean Popp; Pierre Cour; Baxxter; Jordan; Simon; Thele	4:11
8.	"8:15 to Nowhere"	Otis Blackwell; Jan Jun Hammer; Scott Lee Moss	4:50
9.	"Close Your Eyes"	Glen Mikael Johansson; Sonya Aurora Madan; Baxxter; Jordan; Simon; Thele; Avantgarde	3:26
10.	"The Only One"	Baxxter; Jordan; Simon; Thele; Avantgarde; Jon Baker; Martin Blunt; Jon Brookes; Tim Burgess; Mark Collins	3:33
11.	"Sex and Drugs and Rock 'n' Roll"	Baxxter; Jordan; Simon; Thele; Achim Jannsen; Claas-Phillipp Jambor	3:35
12.	"Copyright"	Baxxter; Jordan; Simon; Thele	3:30
13.	"Bang Bang Club"	Robert Phillipp Orlando; Baxxter; Jordan; Simon; Thele	4:02
14.	"Summer Dream"	Baxxter; Jordan; Simon; Thele; Edward Funkhouser; Francesco Contadini; Fulvio Zafret; Walter D'Alo	3:21
15.	"Mashuaia"	Baxxter; Jordan; Simon; Thele; Avantgarde	6:05
16.	"Friends Turbo"	Baxxter; Jordan; Ferris Bueller; Thele	3:19

=== CD2 ===
No.	Title	Length
1.	"Suck My Megamix – The Longest Scooter Single In The World"	1:19:57

=== Web ===
No.	Title	Length
1.	"Suck My Megamix – The Longest Scooter Single In The World (Extended Version)"	1:53:18

CD2 (Suck My Megamix):

01. One (Always Hardcore)
02. Ti Sento
03. Jumping All Over the World
04. Jump That Rock (Whatever You Want)
05. And No Matches
06. The Question is What is the Question?
07. Faster Harder Scooter
08. Hello! (Good to be Back)
09. Move Your Ass!
10. How Much is the Fish?
11. Jigga Jigga!
12. Ramp! (The Logical Song)
13. Nessaja
14. J'adore Hardcore
15. Friends Turbo
16. Let Me be Your Valentine
17. Rebel Yell
18. Endless Summer
19. I'm Raving
20. Suavemente
21. Apache Rocks the Bottom!
22. Lass uns Tanzen
23. Shake That!
24. The Only One
25. We are the Greatest
26. Aiii Shot the DJ
27. Maria (I Like It Loud)
28. Posse (I Need You on the Floor)
29. Stuck on Replay
30. She's the Sun
31. The Night
32. Weekend!
33. I'm Lonely
34. Fuck the Millennium
35. Call Me Mañana
36. Fire
37. Behind the Cow
38. Break It Up
39. The Sound Above My Hair
40. The Age of Love
41. No Fate
42. I'm Your Pusher
43. I Was Made for Lovin' You
44. Move Your Ass!
45. Hyper Hyper
46. Back in the U.K.

== Limited edition ==
A limited edition version of the album features a DVD containing Scooter's The Stadium Techno Inferno – Live in Hamburg 2011 concert.

DVD (The Stadium Techno Inferno – Live in Hamburg 2011) track listing:

01. Intro
02. Hello! (Good to be Back)
03. Aiii Shot the DJ
04. Jumping All Over the World
05. The Question is What is the Question?
06. I'm Raving
07. The Only One
08. The Logical Song
09. The Leading Horse
10. Stuck on Replay
11. Frequent Traveler / Sunrise (Here I Am) / Cambodia
12. Jigga Jigga!
13. Habanera
14. Fuck the Millenium / Call Me Mañana
15. No Fate
16. Ti Sento
17. J'adore Hardcore
18. Jump That Rock (Whatever You Want)
19. How Much is the Fish?
20. One (Always Hardcore)
21. Fire
22. Nessaja
23. Maria (I Like It Loud)
24. Move Your Ass! / Endless Summer / Hyper Hyper

== Limited Deluxe Fan-Box ==
Limited Deluxe Fan-Box includes the same content as the Limited Edition version along with an exclusive H.P. Baxxter necklace, a double-sided poster and 4 postcards, 1 of which handwright signed by Scooter members. All the content is packed in a special box.

=== 20 Years of Hardcore Expanded Edition ===
This version, released in 2013, contains the standard album (possibly remastered) and a bonus disc that contains remixes and selected versions of tracks. The bonus disc's track list is as follows:

1. Friends Turbo (Movie Version)
2. Friends Turbo (The Drum 'n' Bass Mix)
3. The Only Club
4. David Doesn't Eat (Eric Chase Remix)
5. C'est Bleu (The Dubstyle Mix)
6. It's a Biz (Ain't Nobody) (The Big Mash Up Tour 2012 Edit)
7. It's a Biz (Ain't Nobody) (Club Mix)

== Charts ==
Chart (2011)	Peak position
Austrian Albums (Ö3 Austria)	30
Czech Albums (ČNS IFPI)	26
German Albums (Offizielle Top 100)	15
Hungarian Albums (MAHASZ)	39
Russian Albums (2M)	19
Swiss Albums (Schweizer Hitparade)	47
UK Dance Albums (Official Charts)	39

== Release history ==
List of release dates, showing country, record label, and format
Region	Date	Label	Format
Germany	14 October 2011	Sheffield Tunes	2CD (Standard edition)
Germany	14 October 2011	Sheffield Tunes	2CD + DVD (Limited edition)
Germany	14 October 2011	Sheffield Tunes	2CD + DVD + Special items (Limited Deluxe Fan-Box)
Germany	14 October 2011	Sheffield Tunes	digital download
Denmark	2 November 2011	Warner musik DK	2CD (Standard edition)
Denmark	2 November 2011	Warner musik DK	2CD + DVD (Limited edition)
Poland	4 November 2011	Magic Records	2CD (Standard edition)
Australia	18 November 2011	Central Station	2CD (Standard edition)
Singapore	December 2011	EQ Music Pte Ltd	2CD + DVD (Special 3-Disc edition)
Russia	1 March 2012	Kontora Music	CD
Germany	16 March 2012	Sheffield Tunes	digital download (2012 Tour edition)

== Notes ==
- The "C.I.F.L." abbreviation stands for "Copyright is for losers". You can hear the phrase by listening to the introduction in reverse.
- "David Doesn't Eat" samples the 1980 single "A Walk in the Park" by The Nick Straker Band, contains synth and drum sequences from "Promises" by Nero and also contains the lead synth from "Boom Boom Pow" by The Black Eyed Peas.
- "Dreams" samples the 1980 single "Reality" by Richard Sanderson and a synth sequence from Skrillex's remix of "Cinema" by Benny Benassi.
- "Beyond the Invisible" samples the 1996 single "Beyond The Invisible" by Enigma.
- "Sugary Dip" samples the 1975 song "Have You Ever Been Mellow" by John Farrar, originally performed by Olivia Newton-John.
- "It's a Biz (Ain't Nobody)" samples the 1983 song "Ain't Nobody" by Chaka Khan.
- "Close Your Eyes" samples the 1996 single "Dark Therapy" by Echobelly.
- "C'est Bleu" samples the 1967 French song "L'amour est bleu" by André Popp and Pierre Cour, originally performed by Vicky Leandros. Main melody is taken from 1984 track "The Reflex" by Duran Duran. It also samples the 2008 track "I survived" by The Hose.
- "08:15 to Nowhere" is Scooter's version of the 1984 single "8:15 to Nowhere" by Vicious Pink.
- "The Only One" samples the 1990 single "The Only One I Know" by The Charlatans and the 1992 single "Lithium" by Nirvana. Rhythmical elements taken from 2002's "The Crowd Song" by Rhythm Gangsta also appear throughout the song.
- "Copyright" samples lyrics from the 1997 single "Discohopping" by Klubbheads and lyrics from Scooter's own song "She Said" from the 1997 album "Age of Love".
- "Bang Bang Club" samples music from the song "Passion" by The Flirts
- "Summer Dream" samples the 1995 single "Summer Dream of Love" by Sheila.
- "Suck My Megamix" features all 46 Scooter singles released up till October 2011 in one megamix.
