= Dink (band) =

American industrial rock band

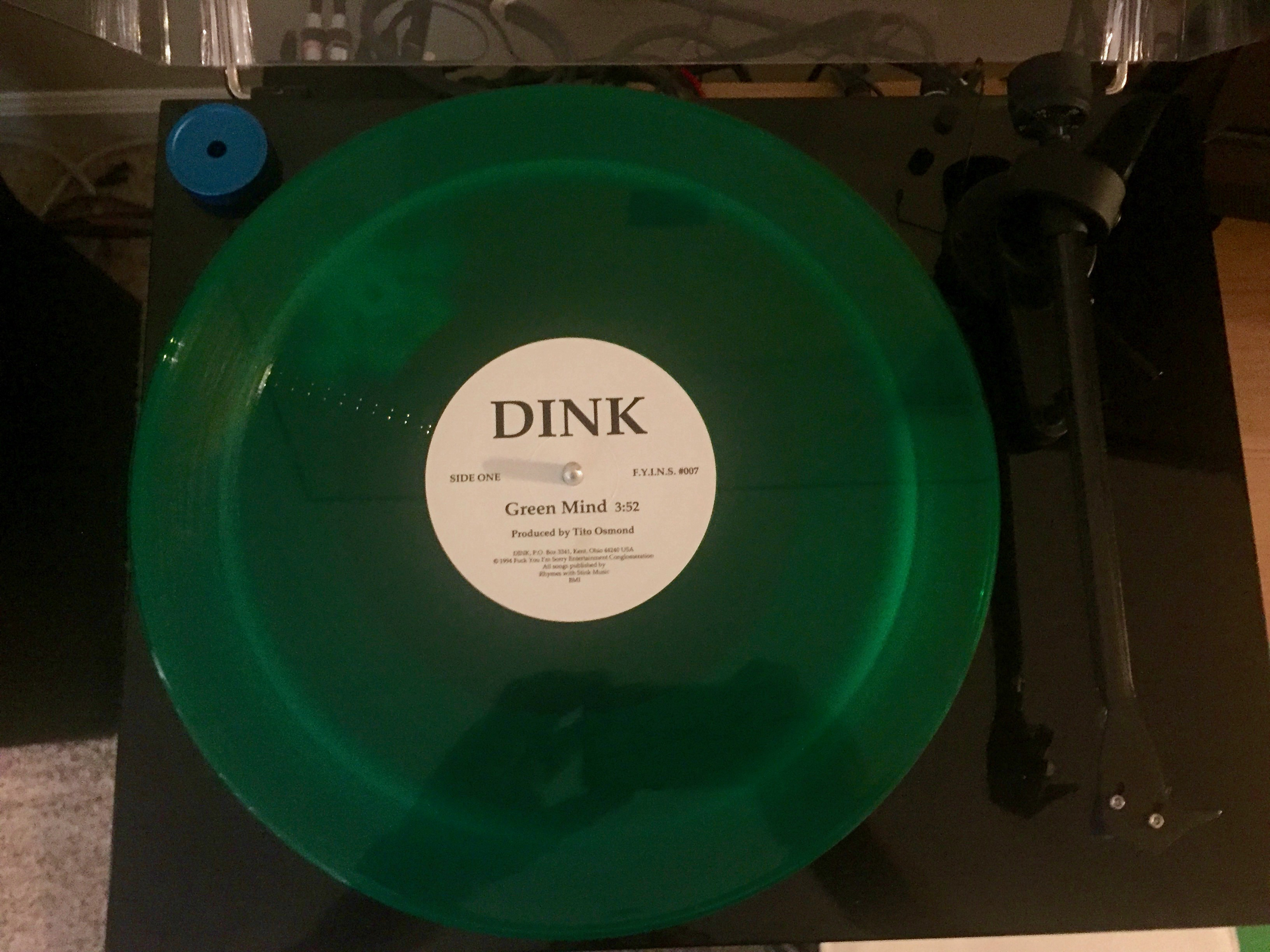
Dink Green Mind 12" Single

Dink (styled DINK) was an alternative/industrial rock band formed in Kent, Ohio in 1992. The band combined elements of industrial music, hip hop, hard rock, and electronic dance. Dink's members included Sean Carlin (guitar, vocals, programming), Rob Lightbody (vocals, guitar), Jer Herring (guitar, vocals), Jeff Finn (bass), and Jan Eddy Van Der Kuil (drums).

== History ==
Dink initially released 3 EPs in the early 1990s. These EPs were exclusively printed on cassettes. The band eventually released one self-titled album, also mostly self-produced, in 1994 on Capitol Records. The release peaked at #31 on Billboard's Heatseekers Albums chart. It featured one song produced by Skinny Puppy's Dave "Rave" Ogilvie (although he also mixed 8 out of the 10 songs). The song "Green Mind" was a hit, featuring some play on MTV and in the films Fear and Double Dragon, and was also remixed by Sascha Konietzko of KMFDM on the promo single. "Green Mind" also charted on the Billboard Modern Rock Tracks chart in early 1995 at No. 35, staying on the chart for 6 weeks. It also reached the Bubbling Under Hot 100 chart at No. 18.

The band's next two singles, "Angels" (which was featured in the film Bad Boys during the Club Hell scene) and "Get on It" also were released. Dink toured briefly with bands such as Pop Will Eat Itself, KMFDM, and Lords of Acid to further promote their debut. The band toured with Pop Will Eat Itself and Compulsion from November 17 to December 17, 1994. The band also contributed the song "USA Sex" to the mid-1990s compilation It Was Made in Northeast Ohio.

Dink recorded a follow-up album, also on Capitol in 1995, and some of the songs would be released on the limited edition EP Blame It on Tito, which was released in 1996. The EP included a cover of the Neil Young song "Ohio" as well. The band then recorded additional songs for a second album to be released in late 1997 or early 1998, but was dropped by Capitol due to the changing musical climate. This led to the band's break up in 1998.

In 2014, film director Jorge Delarosa released a Dink documentary both on DVD and online, titled Gangrene: The Dink Documentary. 4 out of the 5 band members were interviewed for the documentary. Also around this time, the full length version of the scrapped album Blame It on Tito was leaked/released online, consisting of 13 songs. Sean Carlin, Jan Eddy Van Der Kuil, and Jeff Finn created a new band named K.I.N.D. (Killer Instinct Never Dies), along with long time friend Steve Gang. A few songs were released on the band's official ReverbNation page.

Dink's frontman, Sean Carlin, died of cancer in 2023.

== Members ==
- Sean Carlin – lead vocals, guitar, programming
- Rob Lightbody – lead vocals, guitar
- Jer Herring – guitar, backup vocals
- Jeff Finn – bass
- Jan Eddy Van Der Kuil – drums

== Discography ==
=== Studio albums ===
- Dink – 1994
- Blame It on Tito – 2014 (recorded in 1996 and 1997)

=== EPs ===
- Angels – 1993
- Cops Are Baffled – 1993
- Smile Honey – 1994
- Blame It on Tito – 1996
