= C'est Bleu =

2011 song by Scooter

Single by Scooter featuring Vicky Leandros

from the album The Big Mash Up
- Released: 2 December 2011
- Recorded: 2011
- Genre: Hardstyle
- Length: 3:11
- Label: Sheffield Tunes
- Songwriter(s): André Popp; Pierre Cour; H.P. Baxxter; Rick J. Jordan; Michael Simon; Jens Thele
- Producer(s): Scooter

Scooter singles chronology
"David Doesn't Eat" (2011)	"C'est Bleu" (2011)	"It's a Biz (Ain't Nobody)" (2012)

Music video
- "C'est Bleu" on YouTube

"C'est Bleu" is a single by German hard dance band Scooter. It was released on 2 December 2011 as the fourth single from their fifteenth studio album The Big Mash Up.

The song samples L'amour est bleu, a Vicky Leandros song from 1967.

== Track listing ==
CD single (2-track)
No.	Title	Length
1.	"C'est Bleu" (Radio Edit)	3:11
2.	"C'est Bleu" (The Dubstyle Mix)	4:23

Download
No.	Title	Length
1.	"C'est Bleu" (Radio Edit)	3:11
2.	"C'est Bleu" (The Dubstyle Mix)	4:23
3.	"C'est Bleu" (Extended Version)	6:01

Danish promo CD single
No.	Title	Length
1.	"C'est Bleu" (Radio Edit)	3:11
2.	"C'est Bleu" (Album Version)	4:11
3.	"C'est Bleu" (Extended Version)	6:01
4.	"C'est Bleu" (The Dubstyle Mix)	4:23

== Chart performance ==
Chart performance for "C'est Bleu"
Chart (2011–2012)	Peak position
Czech Republic (Rádio – Top 100)	81
Germany (GfK)	77
