= The Only One (Scooter song) =

2011 song by Scooter

Single by Scooter

from the album The Big Mash Up
- B-side: "The Only Club"
- Released: 20 May 2011
- Recorded: 2011
- Studio: Sheffield Underground Studios (Hamburg, Germany)
- Genre: Electro house
- Length: 3:32
- Label: Sheffield Tunes
- Composers: H.P. Baxxter; Rick J. Jordan; Chris Avantgrade; Jens Thele; Jonathan Baker; Martin Blunt; Jon Brookes; Tim Burgess; Mark Collins
- Lyricists: H.P. Baxxter; Rick J. Jordan; Michael Simon; Jens Thele; Baker; Blunt; Brookes; Burgess; Collins
- Producer: Scooter

Scooter singles chronology
"Friends Turbo" (2011)	"The Only One" (2011)	"David Doesn't Eat" (2011)

Music video
- "The Only One" on YouTube

"The Only One" is a 2011 track from German band Scooter. It was released on 20 May 2011 and is the second single from their 2011 album, The Big Mash Up. "The Only One" charted in Germany, peaking at position 45 on the German charts.

== Track listing ==
CD single (2-track)

1. "The Only One" – 3:32
2. "The Only Club – 5:02

Download

1. "The Only One" – 3:32
2. "The Only One" (Extended) – 5:15
3. "The Only Club" – 5:02

== Charts ==
Chart performance for "The Only One"
Chart (2011)	Peak position
Austria (Ö3 Austria Top 40)	20
Germany (GfK)	45
