= Mary Lou Lord =

American singer-songwriter

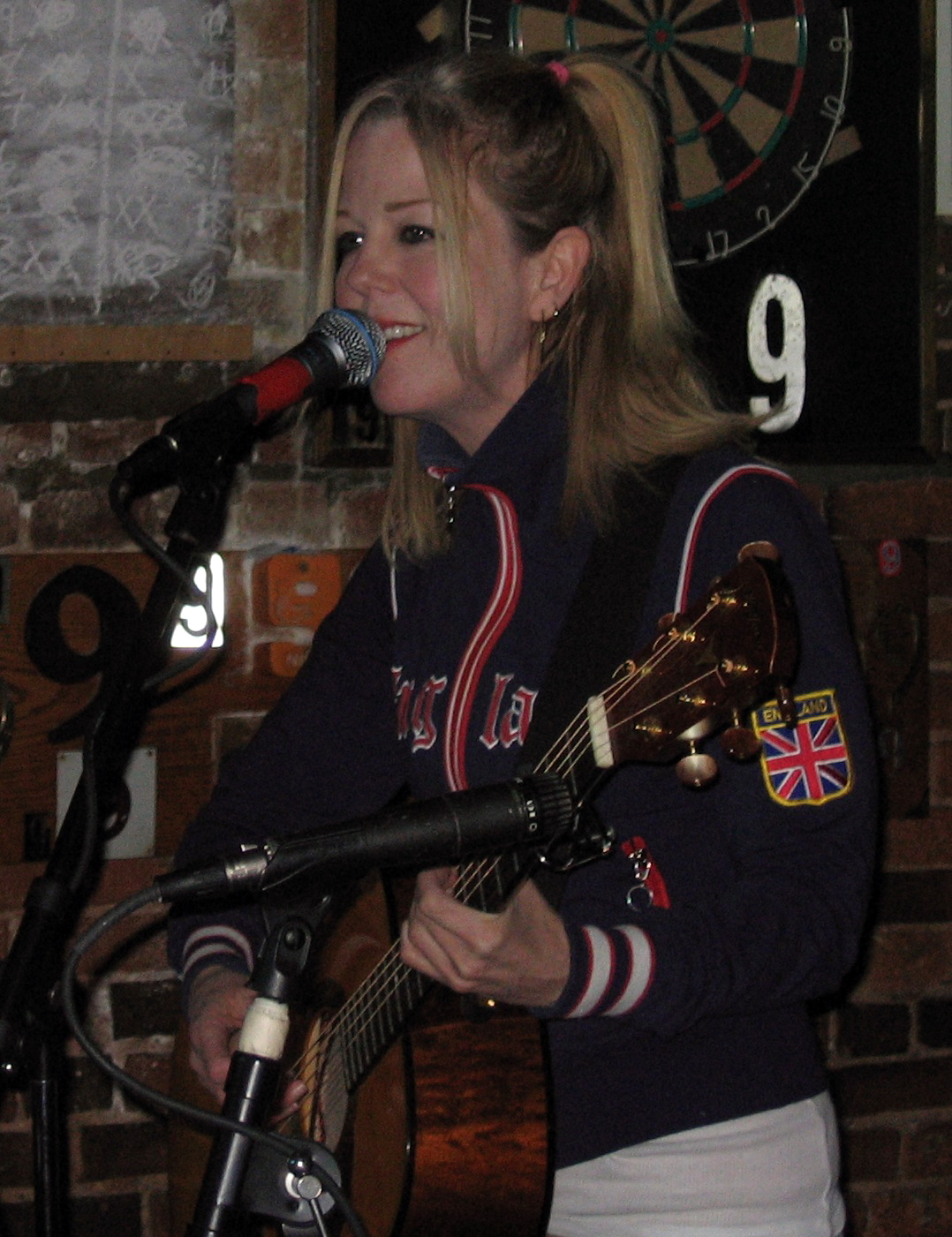
- Mary Lou Lord performing in 2006

Background information
- Born: March 1, 1965 (age 60); Salem, Massachusetts, U.S.
- Genres: Folk, folk rock, pop
- Occupation(s): Singer-songwriter, busker
- Instrument(s): Vocals, guitar
- Years active: 1990–present
- Labels: Kill Rock Stars, Work Records, Rubric Records, Loose Music
- Website: maryloulord.net

Mary Lou Lord (born March 1, 1965) is an indie folk musician who started out performing as a busker in Boston.

== Life and career ==
Mary Lou Lord first gained attention playing acoustic guitar and singing in and around Boston's subway stations, particularly on the Red Line, as noted by the name she chose for her music and lyric publishing company, On the Red Line Music, administered by BMI.

Lord became friends with Nirvana front man Kurt Cobain in the fall of 1991, before the group's rise to mainstream fame; there has been much speculation about their relationship. In 2010, Lord published an explanation from her point of view.

She met Elliott Smith through Slim Moon, the owner of Kill Rock Stars and her boyfriend at the time. Lord toured three times with Smith during the 1990s. Smith also wrote and helped Lord record a song called "I Figured You Out" in 1997.

Lord signed with the Sony subsidiary Work in 1997 and released the album Got No Shadow in 1998. On December 31, 1998, Lord and Kevin Patey, from the band Raging Teens, had a daughter, whom they named Annabelle Lord-Patey.

Her recording of Daniel Johnston's "Speeding Motorcycle" (which originally featured on her self-titled 8-song Kill Rock Stars release) was featured in commercials for Target stores, after which her label reissued the song as the lead track of a CD single which also included two demo recordings from the sessions for Got No Shadow.

In 2001, Lord released Live City Sounds. This was a self-released disc of Lord playing live in the Boston subway. The disc was re-released after she signed to Rubric Records.

Baby Blue, a CD recorded at London and produced by the Bevis Frond leader Nick Saloman, was released by Rubric Records in 2004. Saloman played guitar, bass and harp and wrote most of the songs.

Lord announced in 2005 that she suffered from a rare vocal cord affliction known as spasmodic dysphonia. She thereafter became more involved in A&R work and started a new management company with Kevin Patey, Jittery Jack Management.

In 2011, Lord used Kickstarter to record a new album titled Backstreet Angels, which was self-released in 2015. In 2012 she began performing regularly once again.

In 2019, Lord and fellow musician Maryanne Window began a podcast titled "How The Hell Did That Happen?" The podcast attracted attention from mainstream media, as Lord provided details of her romance and friendships with Kurt Cobain and Elliott Smith during the 1990s.

== Discography ==
=== Cassettes ===
- Real – Deep Music (1992)
- TSWL (To Sir With Love) – EW Productions/Demo tape (1993)

=== Albums ===
- Got No Shadow – The WORK Group (1998)
- Live City Sounds – Self-released (2001), reissue: Rubric Records (2002)
- Baby Blue – Rubric Records / Loose Music (2004)
- Backstreet Angels – Self-released (2015)
- She'd Be a Diamond – Double LP compilation – Fire Records (2022)

=== EPs and singles ===
- "Some Jingle Jangle Morning (When I'm Straight)" 7" vinyl single – Kill Rock Stars (1993)
- Mary Lou Lord EP – Kill Rock Stars (1995)
- Martian Saints! EP – Kill Rock Stars (1997)
- Mind the Gap EP – The WORK Group (1997)
- The Pace of Change EP – The WORK Group (1998)
- Lights Are Changing EP – The WORK Group (1998)
- "She Had You" single – The WORK Group (1998)
- (Untitled) EP – Kill Rock Stars (1999)
- Mary Lou Lord/Sean Na Na Split EP – Kill Rock Stars (2000)
- Speeding Motorcycle EP – Rubric Records (2001)

=== Compilation and soundtrack contributions ===
- Stars Kill Rock: "Camden Town Rain" – Kill Rock Stars (1993)
- A Slice of Lemon: "Eternal Circle" – Kill Rock Stars/Lookout Records (1996)
- Working Class Hero: A Tribute to John Lennon: "Power to the People" (with The Minus 5) – Hollywood Records (1995)
- Saturday Morning: Cartoons' Greatest Hits: "Sugar, Sugar" (with Semisonic), – MCA Records (1995)
- Safe and Sound: "Polaroids" – Big Rig Records / Mercury Records (1996)
- Jabberjaw: Pure Sweet Hell: "Birthday Boy" – Mammoth Records (1996)
- Yo Yo A Go Go: "Helsinki (live)" – Yo Yo Recordings (1996)
- Everybody Wants Some: "Jump" – CherryDisc (1997)
- 107.1 KGSR / Radio Austin – Broadcasts Volume 6: "His N.D. World" (live) – KGSR (1998)
- Zero Effect Motion Picture Soundtrack: "Some Jingle Jangle Morning" – Sony Music (1998)
- Wicked Good Sampler Vol. IV: "On the Avenue" – Sony Music (1998)
- SXSW Volume 5: "I'm Talking To You" (live) – SXSW (1999)
- Transmission 1: Tea at the Palaz of Hoon: "The Outdoor Miner" – Cosmodemonic Telegraph Inc. (2000)
- Rubric 01: "From Galway to Graceland" – Rubric Records (2000)
- Gordon Gano: Hitting The Ground: "Oh Wonder" – Cooking Vinyl (2002)
- For a Decade of Sin: 11 Years of Bloodshot Records: "Cold Company" – Bloodshot Records (2005)
- Joe Harvard: Country Eastern – Aeria Records (2008)
- Kill Rock Stars 30: "Some Song" (with Mikaela Davis) – Kill Rock Stars (2021)
- The Boys With The Perpetual Nervousness: The Third Wave Of...: "Isolation" (feat. Mary Lou Lord) – Bobo Integral (2022)
- Shine On: A Tribute to Pete Ham: "Baby Blue" - Y&T Music (2023)
