= Baby Blue (Mary Lou Lord album) =

Studio album by Mary Lou Lord
- Released: 2004
- Studio: Gold Dust, London
- Genre: Pop, rock, folk rock
- Label: Rubric
- Producer: Nick Saloman, Colin Andrews

Mary Lou Lord chronology
Live City Sounds (2002)	Baby Blue (2004)	Backstreet Angels (2015)

Baby Blue is an album by the American musician Mary Lou Lord, released in 2004. The album is dedicated to Elliott Smith. Lord supported it with a North American tour, while maintaining her tradition of busking in various cities.

== Production ==
Recorded over nine days in London, Baby Blue was produced by Nick Saloman, of the Bevis Frond, and Colin Andrews. Lord wrote one song and cowrote two songs with Saloman. The album includes two covers, Badfinger's "Baby Blue" and Pink Floyd's "Fearless". Lord dealt with spasmodic dysphonia during the recording sessions; she was also disinclined to practice the songs or memorize the lyrics, leading her to retrospectively refer to Baby Blue as a "midlife crisis" album. She preferred playing live to recording, as she was skeptical of producing official versions of songs. "Someone Always Talks" is about worrying that a fellow musician will co-opt a partially finished idea.

== Critical reception ==
Professional ratings
Review scores
Source	Rating
AllMusic	3.5/5 stars
Boston Herald	3/4 stars
Chicago Sun-Times	3/4 stars
The Encyclopedia of Popular Music	3/5 stars
Fort Worth Star-Telegram	B
The Kansas City Star	3/4 stars
Pitchfork	5.7/10
The Republican	3/5 stars
Spin	B

The Boston Globe called the album "smart pop [and] softly skewed rock tunes". The Washington Post concluded that "the folk-rock arrangements, the blended lyricism of female vocal with lead guitar, the frustrated longing and such Britishisms as 'Cold Kilburn Rain' inevitably recall Fairport Convention." The Charleston Daily Mail considered it "a charming folk-pop record", but "yet another release that would have benefited from some editing." The Star Tribune praised the "playful, twangy, melancholic arrangements". The Chicago Tribune noted that "Lord sounds most convincing when she's actually singing her own material, whether it's 'Long Way from Tupelo' or the token growin' older number '43'."

Goldmine said that the album is "nearly quaint—a folk record steered by Lord's post-punk fall-out, family life and not-so-scarring battle with the majors." The Knoxville News Sentinel opined that "Baby Blue's most notable strength comes in a rock form that sounds surprisingly like Belly, a modest major-label phenomenon in the 90s... Baby Blue's impressive songs aside, Lord's story is still more interesting than her albums." The Boston Herald praised her "sumptuous dusty-sweet voice". The Chicago Sun-Times considered the album "a keeper, with a beautiful, gently swaying Gram Parsons/Emmylou Harris druggie-country lilt, and a strong pop sensibility that offsets the occasional flash of precious singer-songwriter pretensions."

== Track listing ==
No.	Title	Length
1.	"The Wind Blew All Around Me"
2.	"Long Way from Tupelo"
3.	"43"
4.	"Baby Blue"
5.	"Cold Kilburn Rain"
6.	"Farming It Out"
7.	"The Inhibition Twist"
8.	"Because He's Leaving"
9.	"Someone Always Talks"
10.	"Turn Me Round"
11.	"Stars Burn Out"
12.	"Ron"
13.	"Fearless"
14.	"Old Tin Tray"
