= Got No Shadow =

Album by Mary Lou Lord

Studio album by Mary Lou Lord
- Released: January 27, 1998
- Recorded: Sunset Sound
- Genres: Rock, folk
- Length: 46:13
- Label: Work
- Producers: Tom Rothrock, Rob Schnapf

Mary Lou Lord chronology
Martian Saints (1996)	Got No Shadow (1998)	Live City Sounds (2001)

Got No Shadow is an album by Mary Lou Lord, released in early 1998 on Work Records, a division of Sony Music. It is Lord's only full-length release on a major label.

== Song information ==
"His Lamest Flame" is a reference to the Elvis Presley song "(Marie's the Name) His Latest Flame".

"She Had You" was a hit in the Philippines, and was played on FM radio in an NU 107 midnight countdown.

"Lights Are Changing", "She Had You", "Supergun" and "Down Along the Lea" were all written by Nick Saloman of British band the Bevis Frond. "Lights Are Changing" first appeared on the band's 1988 album Triptych. Saloman is one of several guitarists playing on this album and a creative collaborator as well; he and Lord also co-wrote "His Lamest Flame", "Two Boats" and "Subway". (Lord has recorded and performed other Saloman songs throughout her career.)

"Some Jingle Jangle Morning" is a re-recording of an original song that first appeared (as "Some Jingle Jangle Morning (When I'm Straight)") in 1993 on Lord's debut 7" vinyl single for Kill Rock Stars. The song is said to be about Kurt Cobain – Mary Lou was briefly involved with Cobain in the early 1990s at the beginning of Nirvana's rise to fame.

"Shake Sugaree" is a folk/blues song written by Elizabeth Cotten, appearing on her 1967 album of the same name. "The Lucky One" is a Freedy Johnston cover.

== Reception ==
Professional ratings
Review scores
Source	Rating
AllMusic	4.5/5 stars
Chicago Sun-Times	3.5/4 stars
Entertainment Weekly	B+
MusicHound Rock	4.5/5 stars
Ox-Fanzine	4.5/5 stars
Pitchfork	8.1/10
Rolling Stone	4/5 stars
The Rolling Stone Album Guide	4/5 stars
Spin	7/10
The Village Voice	A−

Following five years of independent-label singles and EPs and a self-released cassette, Lord's long-awaited debut album received positive reviews and critical acclaim in Rolling Stone, Spin and other music publications, and from Robert Christgau in his Consumer Guide column in The Village Voice.

== Track listing ==
1. "His Lamest Flame" (Nick Saloman, Mary Lou Lord) – 3:37
2. "Western Union Desperate" (Lord) – 3:09
3. "Lights Are Changing" (Saloman) – 5:23
4. "Seven Sisters" (Lord) – 3:36
5. "Throng of Blowtown" (Lord) – 3:25
6. "The Lucky One" (Freedy Johnston) – 3:07
7. "She Had You" (Saloman) – 3:57
8. "Some Jingle Jangle Morning (When I'm Straight)" (Lord) – 3:44
9. "Shake Sugaree" (Elizabeth Cotten) – 2:21
10. "Two Boats" (Saloman, Lord) – 4:02
11. "Supergun" (Saloman) – 3:34
12. "Down Along the Lea" (Saloman) – 2:04
13. "Subway" (Lord, Saloman) – 4:14

== Personnel ==
- Mary Lou Lord - Vocals
- Shawn Colvin - Background vocals
- Nick Saloman - Acoustic guitar, guitar
- John Sprague - Bass guitar
- Cait Reed - Violin, tin whistle
- Will Goldsmith - Drums
- Gia Ciambotti - Background vocals
- Joe Ramieri - Drums, percussion
- Beale Dabbs - Steel guitar
- Rusty Anderson - 12-String guitar
- Stephen Silbert - 12-String guitar, acoustic guitar
- Roger McGuinn - Electric 12-String guitar
- Paul Bushnell - Bass guitar
- Nels Cline - Baritone guitar, E-Bow guitar, guitar
- Jon Brion - Chamberlin, harmonium
- Ethan Johns - Steel guitar, slide guitar, accordion
- Rob Schnapf - Acoustic guitar
- Money Mark - Organ
- Elliott Smith - Acoustic guitar
- Ruth Barrett - Dulcimer
- Josh Freese - Drums

== Charts ==
Chart performance for Got No Shadow
Chart (1998)	Peak position
US Heatseeker Albums (Billboard)	26
