= Respect. No to racism =

Anti-racism campaign in Costa Rica

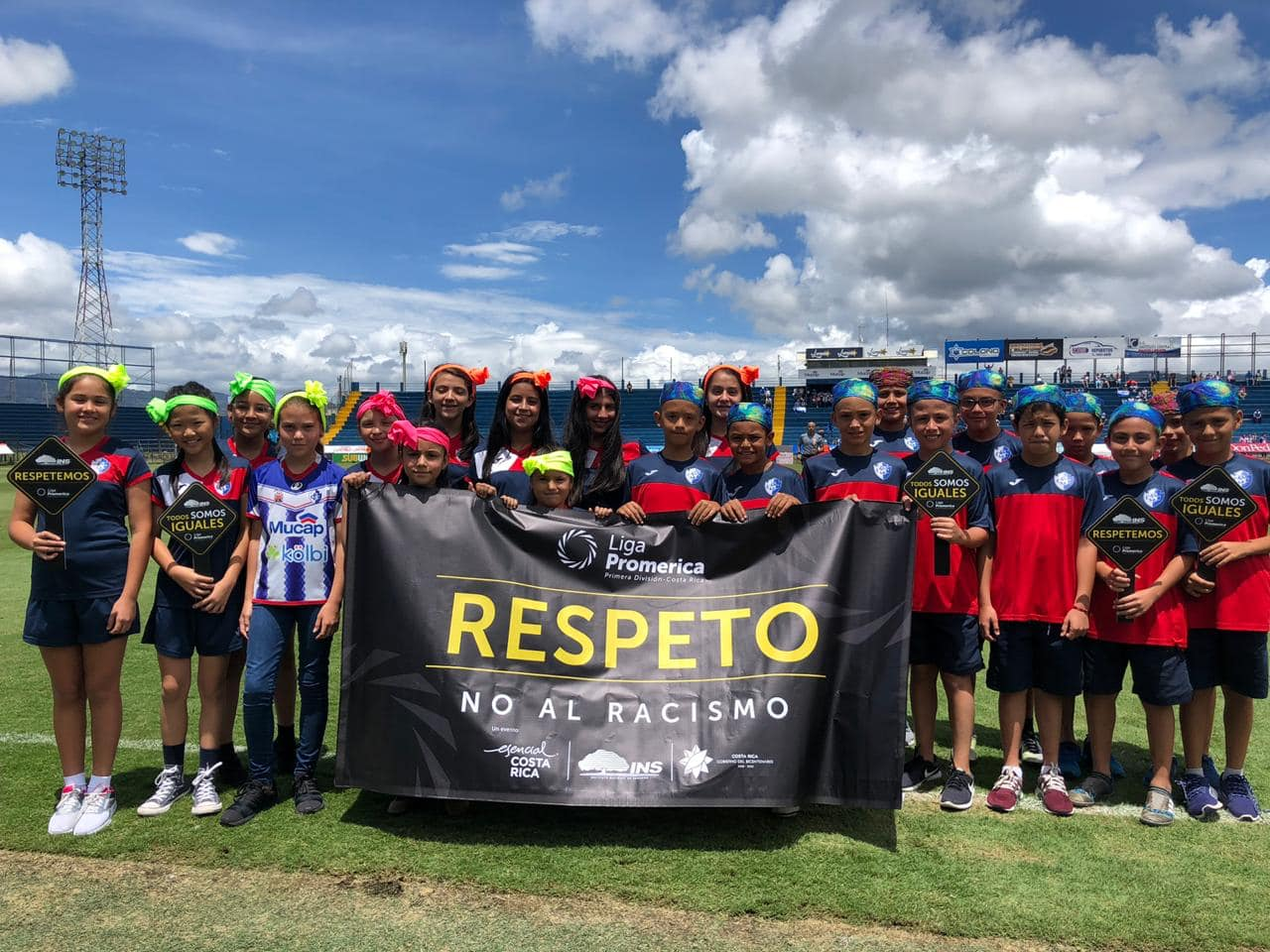
Children lifting the sign that says "Respeto. No al racismo" (Respect. No to racism) at the Fello Meza Stadium in Cartago.

"Respect. No to racism" is an anti-racist, anti-discrimination, and tolerance-promoting campaign in Costa Rica's sports events, particularly in the football matches of the Liga FPD. The campaign aims to foster the integration of values in sports environments, with a primary focus on respect.

It was initially promoted in 2014 by the office in the Legislative Assembly of the then-deputy Epsy Campbell Bar, along with the Association for the Development of Costa Rican Black Women (Center for Afro Women), and actively involved the Union of Football Clubs of the First Division of Costa Rica (UNAFUT).

== Context ==
Racism in association football is the abuse of players, officials, and fans because of their skin colour, nationality, or ethnicity. Some may also be targeted because of their association with an opposing team, although there have been instances of individuals being targeted by their own fans. The topic of racism in association football has been widely covered by the media and in academic studies. There have been a range of responses by various associations, such as FIFA and UEFA, as well as by teams, and individual players and managers to address the problem.

=== In Costa Rica ===
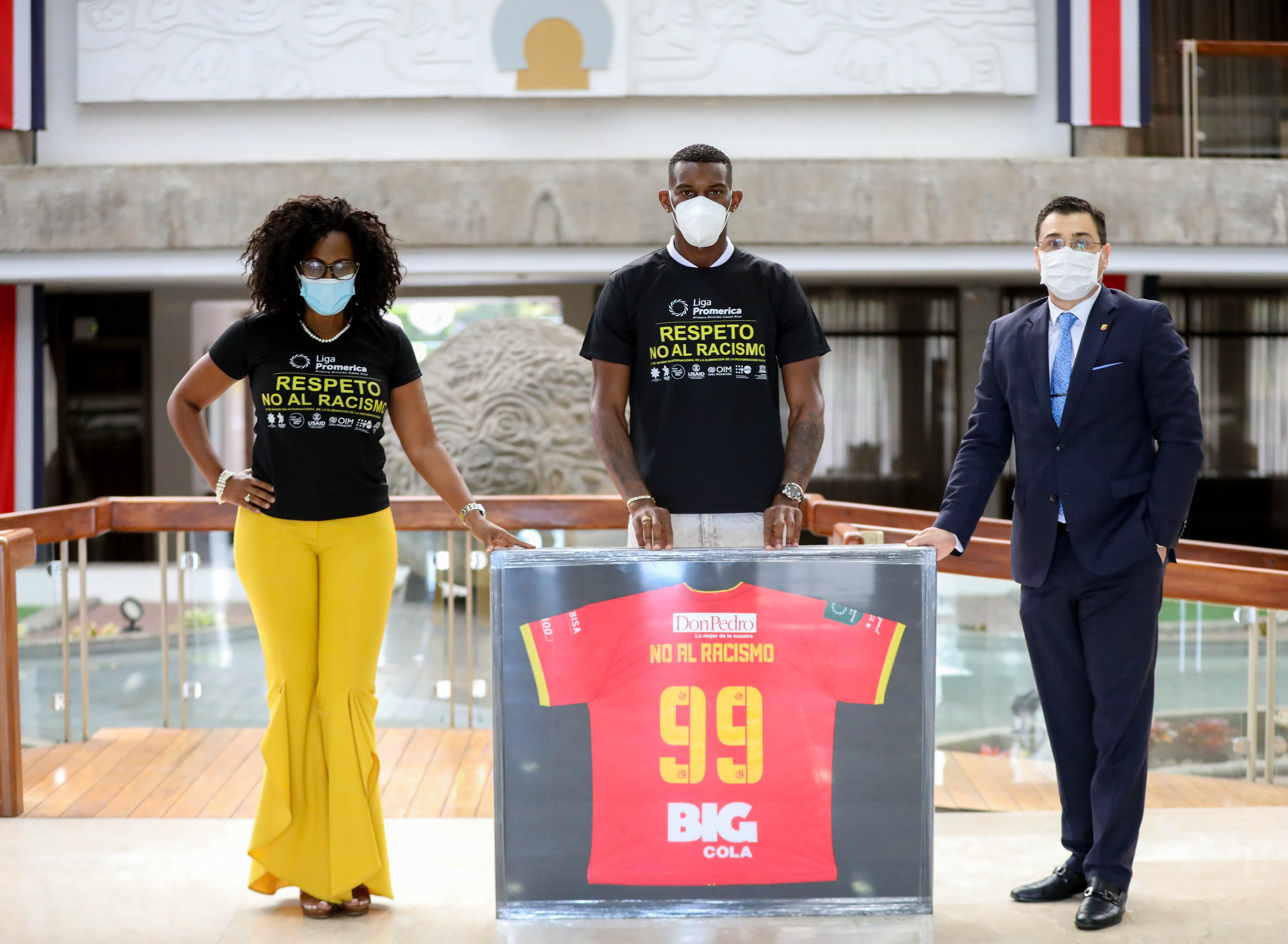
Player Keyner Brown from Club Sport Herediano changed the name on his jersey and placed the phrase "No al racismo" (No to racism).

Racism in Costa Rica is a social phenomenon involving racial or ethnic discrimination by a segment of the population towards ethnic minorities or immigrants. Its origins, like in other Latin American countries, can be traced back to the colonial era, where various processes of extermination, slavery, or intermingling with native populations occurred. Ethnically, the nation is composed—according to the 2011 census data from the National Institute of Statistics and Censuses—of a broad majority of white/mestizo individuals (83.63% of the population). As a result, many Costa Ricans perceive their country as a "European enclave" in indigenous, mestizo Central America. They share an isolationist sentiment that has been traditional in the foreign policy of their governments.

In 2020, the Legislative Assembly of Costa Rica enacted Law 9878 Against Violence and Racism in Sports, signed by President Carlos Alvarado Quesada. The law had been introduced in 2016 by deputy Fabricio Alvarado Muñoz with the support of eleven other legislators.

This law established a comprehensive system of education, prevention, and punishment to address incidents of violence, racism, or any form of discrimination in official sports events and competitions without distinction of categories. It mandated the systematic recording of such incidents by expanding the National Security Commission and the Information System for Security in Sports Events (SISED) that serves as a tool for consultation, control, prevention, and reaction against acts of violence, racism, or discrimination in the sports arena. The legislation is applicable to adults three hours before, during, and three hours after a sporting event and imposes penalties that include permanent disqualification from holding positions in sports entities, loss of membership status, financial penalties, and educational campaigns.

== Campaign ==
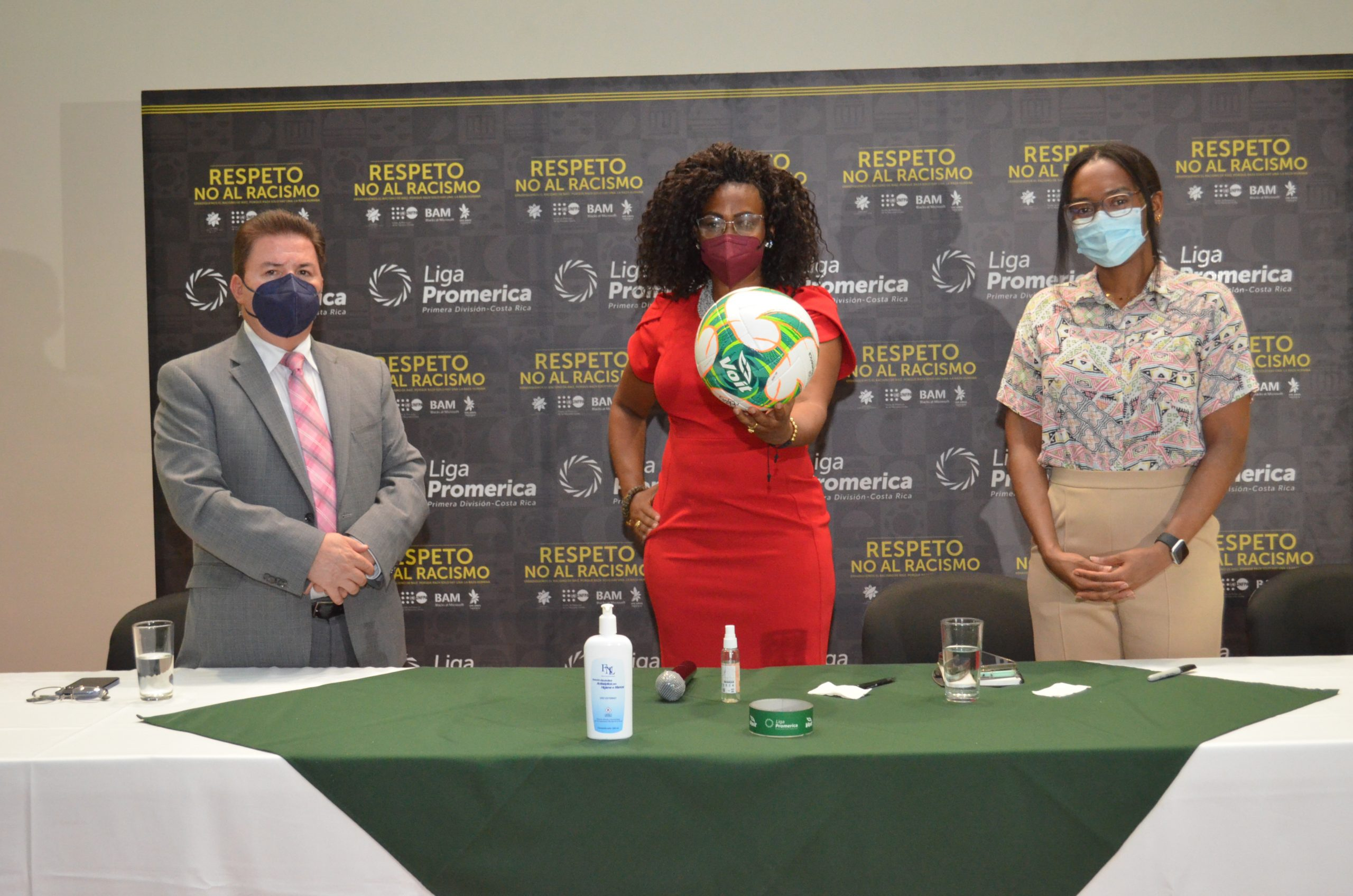
Presentation of the "Respect. No to Racism" Campaign by Epsy Campbell, Vice President of Costa Rica, in collaboration with the Ministry of Sports, the Embassy of Canada, the United Nations Population Fund (UNFPA), Blacks at Microsoft (BAM), and the Union of First Division Football Clubs (UNAFUT), at an event held at the Jade Museum.

The initiative was inspired by the "Respect" campaign launched by UEFA during the Euro 2008 tournament in Austria and Switzerland with the aim of promoting respect in football. The campaign's goal is to foster respect towards players, coaches, referees, fans, and diversity in general. Over the years, it has focused its efforts on combating racial discrimination and promoting inclusion in the football environment.

The Costa Rican campaign employs strategies such as education, awareness-raising, networking, collaboration, communication, and legislation to combat discrimination and promote inclusion in football. It also seeks to raise awareness among players, coaches, and fans about the contributions of African and Afrodescendant individuals to football and society in general, with the objective of eradicating racial discrimination in sports and promoting diversity and inclusion.

Throughout its eight consecutive editions, as part of the commemoration of the Day of the Black Person and Afro-Costa Rican Culture, as well as the International Day for People of African Descent, players from the twelve clubs in the First Division of Costa Rican Football show their support for the national campaign by wearing symbolic jerseys and displaying banners and messages promoted by their respective captains. The initiative is based on the Durban Declaration and Programme of Action, as well as the International Decade for People of African Descent. These documents establish the commitment of states to combat racism, racial discrimination, xenophobia, and related forms of intolerance at the national, regional, and international levels. Additionally, the campaign urges states to collaborate with intergovernmental organizations, the International Olympic Committee, and international and regional sports federations to intensify efforts against racism in sports.

The campaign has formed alliances with the public and private sectors, as well as civil society organizations and international cooperation agencies such as the United Nations Population Fund (UNFPA), Blacks at Microsoft (BAM), the United Nations Educational, Scientific and Cultural Organization (UNESCO), the International Organization for Migration (IOM), and the United States Agency for International Development (USAID).

In parallel with the campaign, disciplinary measures have been implemented in cases of racist behavior through UNAFUT, and support has been provided to the victims of such acts.
