= Respect (Diana King album) =

Studio album by Diana King
- Released: July 30, 2002
- Length: 44:51
- Label: Maverick
- Producer: Andy Marvel

Diana King chronology
Think Like a Girl (1997)	Respect (2002)	Warrior Gurl (2010)

Respect is the third studio album by singer-songwriter Diana King. It was released by Maverick Records on July 30, 2002. The album includes the lead single, "Summer Breezin'" and the songs "Down Lo", "She Had A..." and "Wallflower". "Summer Breezin" was featured in the video game Dead or Alive Xtreme 2.

== Background ==
Respect marked King's third studio album, and her first on Maverick. The singer found that the album was "like another debut" for her: "This album is the result of me finally feeling comfortable with who I am and being able to express myself 100%. I've come to love who I am as an artist."

== Track listing ==
Respect track listing
No.	Title	Writer(s)	Length
1.	"Summer Breezin'"	Diana King; Andy Marvel; Arnie Roman	3:24
2.	"Suga, Suga"	King; Marvel; Roman	3:38
3.	"Credit Card"	King; Marvel; Billy Mann; Heather Headley	4:10
4.	"Mi Lova"	King; Marvel	3:53
5.	"Smooth Girl"	King; Marvel	3:51
6.	"Down Lo" (duet with Papa Dee)	King; Marvel; Dee	3:52
7.	"Tick Boom"	Marvel; King; Mann	3:09
8.	"She Had a..."	Marvel; King; Roman	3:17
9.	"Whin Ya Waist"	King; Giloh Morgan	4:14
10.	"Wallflower"	Marvel; King; Mann	3:32
11.	"Dance (Like No One's Watching Us)"	Marvel; King	3:56
12.	"The Real Sh*t"	King; Marvel	3:23
13.	"Summer Breezin'" (with Bounty Killer)	Marvel; King; Roman; Rodney Price	3:48
Total length:			44:51

== Charts ==
Weekly chart performance for Respect
Chart (1997)	Peak position
Japanese Albums (Oricon)	30
