= Respect (UEFA campaign) =

Social responsibility campaign by UEFA

Respect is a social responsibility programme launched in 2008 by the Union of European Football Associations (UEFA). Its main objective is to work towards unity and respect across gender, race, religion and ability.

== Overview ==
The Respect project at UEFA EURO 2012 tournament had four main stands: fighting against racism, increasing and improving access for fans with disabilities, promoting health through physical activity, and improving intercultural dialogue between fans. The ambassadors for the campaign were Italian referee Pierluigi Collina and Dutch footballer Clarence Seedorf. The campaign was mainly visible through TV spot which was broadcast at half-time during matches, as well as on screens at the stadiums. Part of the programme was in co-operation with the Football Against Racism in Europe network. It was entitled RESPECT Diversity and it was co-ordinated by the Warsaw-based NEVER AGAIN Association in Poland and Ukraine. In addition part of the programma is in co-operation with the not for profit organisation Euro-Sportring. Every player and the management of the team will be honoured on the last match day with special attention to UEFA Respect.

The UEFA Respect Fair Play ranking includes as criteria such components as respect to the opponent and the referee as well as behaviour of the fans and the team officials.

== See also ==
- Respect. No to racism (campaign in Costa Rica)
