= Diana King =

Jamaican-American singer-songwriter (born 1970)

- Also known as: KingSinga
- Born: 8 November 1970 (age 55); Spanish Town, St. Catherine, Jamaica
- Genres: Reggae; reggae fusion; dancehall; R&B
- Occupations: Singer, songwriter
- Instrument: Vocals
- Years active: 1993–present
- Label: Work/SME Records (1994–2000)

Diana King (born 8 November 1970) is a Jamaican singer and songwriter who performs a mixture and fusion of reggae, reggae fusion and dancehall. They are best known for their hit 1995 single "Shy Guy" and their cover of "I Say a Little Prayer", which was featured on the soundtrack to My Best Friend's Wedding.

As of 1998, King has sold over five million records worldwide. Regarded as one of the most successful Jamaican artists, they have scored multiple Billboard Hot 100 and Billboard 200 entries. King is also a recipient of the "Vanguard Award" at the Out Music Awards. King is non-binary and was the first openly gay Jamaican artist.

== Career ==
King was born to an Indo-Jamaican mother and an Afro-Jamaican father in Spanish Town. King was a member of the City Heat band, performing on the local hotel circuit before releasing their first solo single, "Change of Heart", in 1991.

After making an appearance on the Notorious B.I.G.'s 1994 song "Respect", from his album Ready to Die, King signed a recording contract with Sony Music. Their first release was a cover of the Bob Marley song "Stir It Up" (which peaked at no. 53 on the Billboard Hot R&B/Hip Hop Songs chart) for the Cool Runnings soundtrack that same year.

King's next single, "Shy Guy", co-written and produced by Andy Marvel was released in 1995. The song, which only took them 10 minutes to write, became a hit, reaching No. 13 on the Billboard Hot 100 and being certified gold by the RIAA in the U.S.; the single also hit No. 2 on the UK Singles Chart, as well as reaching No. 1 on the Eurochart Hot 100 Singles chart, going on to sell nearly five million singles worldwide. "Shy Guy" was also ranked by the Japanese radio station J-Wave as the No. 1 song of 1995. In the UK, it had a place in the top 10 for seven weeks. It served as a single from the soundtrack to the 1995 film, Bad Boys in addition to being the lead release off their debut album Tougher Than Love which was released on 25 April 1995. The album peaked at No. 1 on Billboard's Reggae, No. 85 on R&B, and No. 179 on the Billboard 200 charts. Two follow-up singles "Love Triangle" (No. 85 R&B) and "Ain't Nobody" (No. 94 Pop, No. 63 R&B) followed that same year. In 1996, King collaborated with Nahki on the single "I'll Do It". Also in 1996, their version of "Piece of My Heart" was included on the soundtrack to the film The First Wives Club.

In 1997, King also achieved another hit on the Billboard Hot 100 (No. 38) and the Hot Dance Club Play (No. 8) with their cover version of the song "I Say a Little Prayer" (originally recorded by Dionne Warwick in 1967), which was featured on the soundtrack to the film, My Best Friend's Wedding. Their second album Think Like a Girl was released on 30 September 1997, and entered the Billboard Top Reggae Albums chart at No. 1. The album spawned two more US singles with "L-L-Lies" and "Find My Way Back" in addition to "Supa-Lova-Bwoy" which was released exclusively in Japan. King was also featured on the 1997 soundtrack to the documentary When We Were Kings, where they performed the title track with Brian McKnight.

In 1998, King joined Celine Dion and Brownstone on stage to perform the hit "Treat Her Like a Lady" previously written and recorded by King from Tougher Than Love at the Essence Awards. That year, they also appeared on Soul Train, The RuPaul Show, and VIBE to promote Think Like a Girl. They also collaborated with artists such as Toots Hibbert, Ziggy Marley, Buju Banton, Ini Kamoze, Maxi Priest, Shaggy, Tony Rebel, I-Three, Brian Gold, Handel Tucker, Lowell 'Sly' Dunbar & Mikey Bennett on the charity single "Rise Up" with Jamaica United.

In 1999, King toured India doing a five city tour. From Goa, they said: "I never thought I would come back to India." King entered negotiations with Madonna's Maverick Records label in 2000. In 2002, King premiered their single, "Summer Breezin'" on BET and VH1 video outlets, and it received some urban radio airplay, their third album Respect was released on 24 July 2002 in Japan, with plans for other markets such as the US and Europe eventually cancelled. However, it finally received a release in other markets such as the UK on 17 April 2006 and the United States on 28 April 2008. In 2006, King released the single "Spanish Town Blues" for a Taxi Records compilation album with Sly & Robbie.

In 2007, King co-wrote and recorded the song "The Light Within" with the German reggae artist Gentleman, for his album Another Intensity. Additionally, they also collaborated with Sarah and Kid Capri for a single called "Get Me @ This Party". Later that year, they formed their own record label, ThinkLikeAgirl. In 2009, they collaborated with Richie Stephens on a remake of the ballad "The Closer I Get to You" for his album Forever.

In 2010, King's record label ThinkLikeAgirL Music Inc. went through a licensing deal with Warner Music Japan with the release of their fourth album, Warrior Gurl. The album was released in Japan on 22 September 2010. It was led by the single "Yu Dun Kno" which was released that same year. They also recorded a track "Bounce" for another Taxi Records compilation album. For the international release of the album, King renamed the album to AgirLnaMeKING and it was released on their birthday, 8 November 2012. Two more singles "Closer" and "Jeanz N T-Shirt" were released in 2012. In 2016, King announced they were at work on an all-lesbian record label in addition to a new studio album and an EP. The full-length album was to be a reggae release, while the EP an EDM release.

== Personal life ==
King gave birth to a daughter, Shalamar Diana Wright, when they were sixteen. King was previously married to their tour manager Orville Aris, with whom they share a son, born in 1996. In June 2012, King came out as a lesbian via Facebook, stating: "I answer now, not because it's anyone's business but because it feels right with my soul and I believe by not answering or hiding it all these years somehow makes it appear as if I am ashamed of it or that I believe it is wrong." King has 15 siblings, but since coming out are now only close to one, as of 2016. King realized they were gay in their twenties, but it took a decade to become comfortable with it publicly, for fear of backlash towards their children. King was honoured for their bravery on 16 December 2012 and was presented with the Vanguard Award at the Out Music Awards in Las Vegas. King was the first openly gay Jamaican artist.

In January 2018, King announced that they had married their long-time girlfriend, the Jamaican violinist Mijanne Webster. In 2018, King came out as non-binary and created a GoFundMe campaign to raise money for top surgery. On August 5, 2021, King announced that their daughter, Shalamar, had died after being taken off life support. King holds both Jamaican and US citizenship.

== Awards and nominations ==
Year	Awards	Work	Category	Result	Ref.
1995	Billboard Music Video Awards	"Shy Guy"	Best R&B/Urban Video of the Year	Nominated	
1995	Billboard Music Video Awards	"Shy Guy"	Best R&B/Urban Video of the Year - New Artist	Nominated	
1997	Online Film & Television Association	"I Say a Little Prayer"	Best Adapted Song	Won	
2012	Out Music Awards	Themself	Vanguard Award	Won	

== Discography ==
=== Albums ===
List of albums, with selected chart positions and certifications
Title	Album details	Peak chart positions						Certifications
Title	Album details	US	US R&B	US Reggae	AUS	JPN	UK	Certifications
Tougher Than Love	Released: 25 April 1995; Label: Work; Formats: CD, cassette	179	85	3	33	5	50	JPN: 3× Platinum
Think Like a Girl	Released: 30 September 1997; Label: Work; Formats: CD, cassette	—	—	1	—	7	—	JPN: Platinum
Respect	Released: 30 July 2002; Label: Maverick; Formats: CD, download	—	—	—	—	30	—	
Warrior Gurl	Released: 2010; Label: ThinkLikeAgirL; Formats: CD, download	—	—	—	—	—	—	
AGirlNameKing	Released: 8November 2011; Label: ThinkLikeAgirL; Formats: CD, download	—	—	—	—	—	—	

=== Live/compilation albums ===
Year	Album	Peak chart positions
Year	Album	JPN
1996	Tougher and Live (Japan)	—
1998	Remix Kingdom (Japan)	24
2002	The Best of Diana King (Japan)	78
2005	Essentials: I Say a Little Prayer (Japan)	—

=== Singles ===
Year	Title	Peak chart positions										Album
Year	Title	US	US R&B	UK	NED	FRA	GER	SWI	SWE	AUS	NZ	Album
1994	"Stir It Up"	—	53	—	—	—	—	—	—	—	24	Cool Runnings: Music from the Motion Picture
1995	"Shy Guy"	13	21	2	3	4	6	5	1	3	3	Tougher Than Love
1995	"Love Triangle"	—	85	—	—	—	—	—	—	73	21	Tougher Than Love
1995	"Ain't Nobody"	94	63	13	27	41	62	31	30	—	28	Tougher Than Love
1996	"I'll Do It" (with Nahki)	—	—	—	—	—	—	—	—	—	—	Non-album single
1997	"When We Were Kings" (with Brian McKnight)	—	—	—	—	—	—	—	—	—	—	When We Were Kings: The Original Motion Picture Soundtrack
1997	"I Say a Little Prayer"	38	68	17	—	34	73	—	—	6	21	Think Like a Girl
1997	"L-L-Lies"	71	67	—	—	35	—	—	47	173	29	Think Like a Girl
1998	"Find My Way Back"	—	—	—	—	—	—	—	—	—	—	Think Like a Girl
1998	"Supa-Lova-Bwoy" (Japan)	—	—	—	—	—	—	—	—	—	—	Think Like a Girl
1998	"Rise Up" (as part of Jamaica United)	—	—	54	—	—	—	—	—	—	—	Non-album single
2002	"Summer Breezin'"	—	—	—	—	85	—	—	45	98	—	Respect
2006	"Spanish Town Blues"	—	—	—	—	—	—	—	—	—	—	Non-album singles
2007	"Get Me @ This Party" (with Sarah feat. Kid Kapri)	—	—	—	—	—	—	—	—	—	—	Non-album singles
2011	"Yu Dun Know"	—	—	—	—	—	—	—	—	—	—	Warrior Gurl; AgirLnaMeKING
2012	"Closer"	—	—	—	—	—	—	—	—	—	—	Warrior Gurl; AgirLnaMeKING
2012	"Jeanz N T-Shirt"	—	—	—	—	—	—	—	—	—	—	Warrior Gurl; AgirLnaMeKING
"—" denotes releases that did not chart or were not released in that territory.
