= Work Group =

American record label

The Work Label
- Parent company: Sony Music Entertainment
- Founded: 1995
- Founder: Jeff Ayeroff; Jordan Harris
- Defunct: 2000
- Status: Defunct
- Distributor: Epic Records
- Genre: Alternative rock; R&B; pop; hip hop
- Country of origin: United States
- Location: New York City, New York

The Work Label (stylized as The WORK Group) was an American record label. Its major album releases included Tidal (1996) by Fiona Apple and On the 6 (1999) by Jennifer Lopez.

== History ==
In July 1999, founders Jeff Ayeroff and Jordan Harris left the label. It was discontinued in 2000 when all the label's artists were moved to Epic Records.

== Catalog ==
Year	Artist	Title
1993	Jamiroquai	Emergency on Planet Earth
1994	Sponge	Rotting Piñata
1995	Jamiroquai	The Return of the Space Cowboy
1995	Schtum	Grow
1995	Ned's Atomic Dustbin	Brainbloodvolume
1995	Mercury Rev	See You on the Other Side
1995	Diana King	Tougher Than Love
1995	Count Bass D	Pre-Life Crisis
1996	Elephant Ride	Forget
1996	Imperial Drag	Imperial Drag
1996	Fiona Apple	Tidal
1996	Midnight Oil	Breathe
1996	Puff Johnson	Miracle
1997	Pond	Rock Collection
1997	Jamiroquai	Travelling Without Moving
1997	Geneva	Further
1997	Brownstone	Still Climbing
1997	Diana King	Think Like a Girl
1997	No Authority	Keep On
1998	Mary Lou Lord	Got No Shadow
1998	Rebbie Jackson	Yours Faithfully
1998	Esthero	Breath from Another
1998	Various	The Planet Sleeps
1998	Eagle-Eye Cherry	Desireless
1998	Tatyana Ali	Kiss the Sky
1999	Cree Summer	Street Faërie
1999	Len	You Can't Stop the Bum Rush
1999	Jennifer Lopez	On the 6
1999	Men of Vizion	MOV
1999	Jamiroquai	Synkronized

== Artists ==
- Amanda Marshall
- Tatyana Ali (MJJ Music/Work)
- Fiona Apple (Clean Slate/Work)
- Elephant Ride
- Dan Bern
- Eagle-Eye Cherry
- Esthero
- Neil Finn (US/Canada)
- Imperial Drag
- Rebbie Jackson (MJJ Music/Work)
- Jamiroquai
- Puff Johnson
- Diana King
- Len
- Jennifer Lopez
- Mary Lou Lord
- Men of Vizion (MJJ Music/Work)
- Mercury Rev
- Midnight Oil
- Morley
- Ned's Atomic Dustbin
- Heather Nova
- Pond
- Pressure Drop
- Sabelle
- Schtum
- Sponge
- Cree Summer
- Chris Whitley
- Count Bass D

== See also ==
- List of record labels
