= Andy Marvel =

American songwriter

- Born: Andrew Michael Saidenberg; July 2, 1958 (age 67)
- Origin: New York, New York, United States
- Genres: Pop; rock; R&B; dance
- Occupations: Record producer, songwriter, musician
- Instruments: Piano, Guitar, Programming
- Years active: 1988–Present
- Label: Universal Music Publishing

Andrew Marvel (born Andrew Michael Saidenberg, July 2, 1958, New York City) is an American songwriter and record producer based out of New York City. He has written songs for Celine Dion, Diana King, Jessica Simpson and Colleen Fitzpatrick. His songs, including "Shy Guy", "With You", and "Treat Her Like a Lady" have appeared on albums that have sold over 70 million copies worldwide.

== Biography ==
Marvel grew up in a musical family. His grandfather was first-chair cellist for the Chicago Symphony. His uncle played Greenwich Village coffeehouses in the ‘60s. He started playing gigs at age ten, learned the formal rules of music at Oberlin College and the Berklee School of Music, then crammed his calendar with punk sets at CBGB’s, a concert with B. B. King at Radio City Music Hall, and sessions as a keyboard player for with Madonna, Chaka Khan, and other hitmakers.

In the 1980s, he was a member of Members Only, a jazz ensemble who recorded for Muse Records.

Marvel found his biggest success working with Ric Wake on Celine Dion records. While working with Ric Wake he met Peter Zizzo. Marvel and Zizzo would later become partners to build Big Baby Recording in 1999. Home-base for Marvel is Big Baby Recording, in Chelsea, Manhattan. There, surrounded by the latest music technology, he continues his pursuit of the Holy Grail in pop music: “an eclectic, unique sound that’s married to solid, memorable pop hooks.”

Marvel's music has been covered by Maxi Priest, Jon Secada, Dream, Patti Austin, Jessica Andrews, Eternal, Nikki Webster, Jennifer Brown, and Garou. He has scored the theme song for a popular Japanese TV show and the title track for the Oscar-winning documentary, When We Were Kings, and has had his songs placed on soundtracks for Bad Boys, My Best Friend’s Wedding, and The First Wives Club.

== Discography ==
Year	Artist	Album/Singles	Charts	Certifactions/Awards	Credits
2008	Lee Mead	Nothing Else Matters: "Nothing Else Matters"	-	-	Writer
2008	Garou	Pieces of My Soul: "Nothing Else Matters"	-	-	Writer
2008	Stefanie Heinzmann	Masterplan: "Can't Get You Out Of My System"	-	-	Writer
2004	Jessica Simpson	In This Skin: "With You"	Billboard #1	2× Platinum 2005 ASCAP Award	Writer, Producer, Arranger, Engineer, Keyboard Programming, Drum Programming
2001	Willa Ford	Willa Was Here: "Tired"; "Prince Charming"	-	-	Writer
2001	Nikki Webster	Follow Your Heart: "Strawberry Kisses"	Australian #3	1× Platinum	Writer, Producer
2001	OV7	7 Latidos: Love Colada	-	-	Producer
2000	Jessica Andrews	Who I Am: "I Wont Like Anyone"	-	US Gold	Writer
1996	Celine Dion	Falling Into You: "Make You Happy"	Billboard #1 US Album #1	32× Platinum	Writer, Producer, Arranger, Engineer, Keyboard Programming, Drum Programming
1996	Diana King	The First Wives Clubs (Music from the Motion Picture): "Pieces of My Heart"	-	-	Producer
1996	Maxi Priest	Man With The Fun: "Watching the World Go By"; "Ain't It Enough"	US Hot 100	-	Writer, Producer,
1995	Celine Dion	Lets Talk About Love: "Treat Her Like a Lady"	Top 40	25× Platinum	Writer
1995	Diana King	Tougher Than Love: "Shy Guy"	Top 20	2× Platinum Worldwide	Writer, Producer
1988	Sweet Sensation	* "One Good Man"	-	-	-
