= Live from Manila =

Live album by Angela Bofill
- Released: 2006
- Venues: Merk’s Bistro, Manila, Philippines
- Genres: Soul, R&B
- Label: Black Angel Productions
- Producer: Angela Bofill

Angela Bofill chronology
Love in Slow Motion (1996)	Live from Manila (2006)	The Essential Angela Bofill (2014)

Live from Manila is a 2006 album recorded by the R&B vocalist Angela Bofill.

This album was a milestone in Bofill's 28-year career. It was her first live concert recording, as well as her final release, following her stroke on January 10, 2006. Performing before a packed Merk's Bistro in Manila, Philippines, she performed signature hits that brought her to the attention of the music world.

Since it was released after the first stroke Bofill suffered, all proceeds from the album went to cover her medical expenses.

== Track listing ==
No.	Title	Writer(s)	Length
1.	"Let Me Be the One" (from Let Me Be the One, 1984)	Angela Bofill; Rick Suchow; Alan Palanker	5:07
2.	"Dialogue"		0:18
3.	"Tonight I Give In" (from Too Tough, 1983)	Lana Bogan; Donnie Shelton	3:44
4.	"Time to Say Goodbye" (from Something About You, 1981)	Angela Bofill	5:36
5.	"Still in Love" (from Tell Me Tomorrow, 1985)	Derek Bramble	4:54
6.	"Break It to Me Gently" (from Something About You)	Doug Frank; Doug James	4:04
7.	"You Should Know By Now" (from Something About You)	Bunny Hull; Earl Klugh	3:40
8.	"Something About You" (from Something About You)	Allee Willis; John Lewis Parker; Robert Wright	4:34
9.	"Ain't Nothing Like the Real Thing" (from Too Tough)	Nickolas Ashford; Valerie Simpson	3:31
10.	"This Time I'll Be Sweeter" (from Angie, 1978)	Gwen Guthrie; Patrick Grant	4:26
11.	"Angel of the Night" (from Angel of the Night, 1979)	Hull; Jim Devlin	8:38

== Personnel ==
- Angela Bofill - vocals
- Bond Samson - keyboards
- Meong Pacana - bass guitar
- Cesar Aguas - guitar
- Mike Alba - drums
- Kitchie Molina - backing vocals
- Babsie Molina - backing vocals
- Sylvia Macaraeg - backing vocals
- Lorrie ILustre - musical director/arranger
