= Utah Saints (album) =

Studio album by Utah Saints
- Released: 8 December 1992
- Genre: Electronic; house; hip hop
- Length: 56:30 (North America version); 61:33 (UK version)
- Label: London
- Producer: Utah Saints

Utah Saints chronology
Utah Saints (1992)	Two (2000)

Alternative cover
- Cover for the 1993 release

Professional ratings
Review scores
Source	Rating
AllMusic	4/5 stars
Christgau's Consumer Guide	A−
Los Angeles Times	3/4 stars
NME	4/10
Rolling Stone	4/5 stars
The Rolling Stone Album Guide	4/5 stars
Select	3/5 medals
Smash Hits	4/5 stars

Utah Saints is the debut album by British electronic band Utah Saints. It was released in the United States on 8 December 1992 on London Records, and on 24 May 1993 in the United Kingdom on FFRR, featuring a different track listing, cover, and two additional songs. The album reached number 10 on the UK Albums Chart; singles released from this album include "Something Good", "I Want You", and "What Can You Do for Me".

== Track listing ==
=== 1992 US release ===
1. "Something Good" (Jez Willis, Kate Bush)
2. "I Want You" (Willis, Jeff Hanneman, Tom Araya)
3. "What Can You Do for Me" (Willis, David A. Stewart, Annie Lennox, Gwen Guthrie)
4. "Soulution" (Willis)
5. "States of Mind" (Willis)
6. "New Gold Dream (81-82-83-84)" (Jim Kerr, Charlie Burchill, Derek Forbes, Mick MacNeil)
7. "Kinetic Synthetic" (Willis)
8. "My Mind Must Be Free" (Ida Reid, Patrick Cowley, Sylvester James, Dave Crawford)
9. "Trance Atlantic Glide" (Willis)
10. "Too Much to Swallow (Part I)" (Willis)

=== 1993 UK release ===
1. "New Gold Dream (81-82-83-84)"
2. "What Can You Do for Me"
3. "Soulution"
4. "Believe in Me"
5. "Too Much to Swallow (Part I)"
6. "Something Good"
7. "I Want You"
8. "States of Mind"
9. "Trance Atlantic Glide"
10. "Kinetic Synthetic"
11. "What Can You Do for Me? (1926 Melodic Mix)"
12. "My Mind Must Be Free"

=== Samples ===
- "Something Good" features a sample of Kate Bush's "Cloudbusting"
- "I Want You" features a sample of Slayer's "War Ensemble"
- "What Can You Do for Me" features samples of Eurythmics' "There Must Be an Angel (Playing with My Heart)", Gwen Guthrie's "Ain't Nothin' Goin' on But the Rent" and Kiss' Alive II album
- "My Mind Must Be Free" features samples of Candi Staton's "Young Hearts Run Free" and Sylvester's "Do Ya Wanna Funk?"
- "Believe in Me" features samples of The Human League's "Love Action (I Believe in Love)" and Crown Heights Affair's "You Gave Me Love".

== Production ==
Adapted from album liner notes.

- Produced by Utah Saints
- Mixed by Utah Saints & Guy Hatton
- Engineered by Guy Hatton, assisted by Phil Evans
- Art direction: Edward ODowd
- Design: Johnny Barbis
- Photography: Allastair Thain
- Computer illustration: Robert Eberhardt

== Charts ==
Chart (1992–93)	Peak position
Australian Albums (ARIA)	111
UK Albums Chart	10
US Billboard 200	165
