= You Should Know by Now =

You Should Know by Now is the title of several songs and musical albums

- You Should Know By Now a track on both the 1981 album Something About You and 2006 album Live from Manila, both by Angela Bofill
- You Should Know By Now, a track on the 1985 album Invasion of Your Privacy by Ratt
- You Should Know By Now (2001) by Barbara Manning
- You Should Know By Now (2010) by Girls Names
- You Should Know By Now by Danny Jones of McFly
