= Let Me Be the One =

Let Me Be the One may refer to:

- Let Me Be the One (album), a 1984 album by Angela Bofill
- "Let Me Be the One" (Angela Bofill song), 1984
- "Let Me Be the One" (The Carpenters song), 1971
- "Let Me Be the One" (Exposé song), 1987
- "Let Me Be the One" (Five Star song), 1985
- "Let Me Be the One" (Hank Locklin song), 1953
- "Let Me Be the One" (The Shadows song), 1975
- "Let Me Be the One" (Sasha song), 2000
- "Let Me Be the One", a song by Blessid Union of Souls from Home
- "Let Me Be the One", a song by Jimmy Bondoc from Musikero
- "Let Me Be the One", a song by Kevin Costner & Modern West
- "Let Me Be the One", a song by Quiet Riot from Guilty Pleasures
- "Let Me Be the One", a song by Six
- "Let Me Be the One", a song by Nicolette Larson from her 1988 album Shadows of Love
- "Let Me Be the One", a song by Jaguar Wright from her 2005 album Divorcing Neo 2 Marry Soul
- "Let Me Be the One", B-side of "I Wanna Be with You" by Mandy Moore (2000)
