= What Can You Do for Me =

1991 single by Utah Saints

Single by Utah Saints

from the album Utah Saints
- Released: 12 August 1991
- Studio: Lion Studios, Leeds, UK
- Length: 3:21
- Label: FFRR
- Songwriters: Annie Lennox; David A Stewart; Gwen Guthrie; Jeremy Willis
- Producer: Utah Saints

Utah Saints singles chronology
"What Can You Do for Me" (1991)	"Something Good" (1992)

Music video
- "What Can You Do For Me" on YouTube

"What Can You Do for Me" is a song by English electronic group Utah Saints. It was released on 12 August 1991, by FFRR Records, as the first single from their self-titled debut album (1992). The song reached number 10 on the UK Singles Chart and number three on the UK Dance Singles chart. It uses samples from "There Must Be an Angel (Playing with My Heart)" by Eurythmics and "Ain't Nothin' Goin' on But the Rent" by Gwen Guthrie. The title "What Can You Do for Me" is taken from lyrics of "Ain't Nothin' Goin' on But the Rent". A music video was also produced to promote the single.

== Chart performance ==
The single was released in August 1991 and entered the UK Singles Chart on 18 August at number 26. The song steadily rose up the chart and peaked at number 10 on 15 September. It spent a total of 11 weeks inside the top 75 chart.

In Australia, "What Can You Do for Me" did not enter the ARIA top 100 singles chart until April 1993, following its re-release after the success of "Something Good".

== Critical reception ==
Cathi Unsworth from Melody Maker wrote, "Excellent! A dance track that incorporates everything groovy, from a hard metallic beat to deliciously disenchanted vocals to an inbred knowledge of why wearing platform boots is an ace fashion statement."

== Charts ==
=== Weekly charts ===
Weekly chart performance for "What Can You Do for Me"
Chart (1991–1993)	Peak position
Australia (ARIA)	90
Europe (European Dance Radio)	16
Ireland (IRMA)	16
Italy (Musica e dischi)	17
Luxembourg (Radio Luxembourg)	6
Sweden (Sverigetopplistan)	35
UK Singles (OCC)	10
UK Airplay (Music Week)	25
UK Dance (Music Week)	3
UK Club Chart (Record Mirror)	9
US Hot Dance Club Play (Billboard)	3
US Maxi-Singles Sales (Billboard)	42

=== Year-end charts ===
Year-end chart performance for "What Can You Do for Me"
Chart (1991)	Position
Italy (Musica e dischi)	89
UK Singles (OCC)	55

== 2012 re-release ==
"What Can You Do for Me"

Single by Utah Saints vs. Drumsound & Bassline Smith
- Released: 26 February 2012
- Length: 2:48
- Label: Ministry of Sound
- Songwriters: Gwen Guthrie; Jeremy Willis

Utah Saints singles chronology
"Football Season Is Over Remix" (2009)	"What Can You Do for Me" (2012)

Drumsound & Bassline Smith singles chronology
"Freak" (2011)	"What Can You Do for Me" (2012)	"Through the Night" (2012)

A new version of the song remixed by Drumsound & Bassline Smith was released on 26 February 2012.

=== Track listing ===
iTunes EP
No.	Title	Length
1.	"What Can You Do for Me" (Utah Saints vs. Drumsound & Bassline Smith) (Radio Edit)	2:48
2.	"What Can You Do for Me" (7th Heaven Remix)	6:00
3.	"What Can You Do for Me" (Ill Blu Remix)	4:59
4.	"What Can You Do for Me" (Tantrum Desire Remix)	4:36
5.	"What Can You Do for Me" (Hervé's Speaker Junkie Remix)	4:36
6.	"What Can You Do for Me" (Felix Leiter & Mark Maitland Remix)	6:54

=== Charts ===
Chart (2012)	Peak position
Scotland Singles (OCC)	28
UK Dance (OCC)	7
UK Singles (OCC)	28
