= Supernatural (Ben E. King album) =

Studio album by Ben E. King
- Released: 1975
- Genre: Soul
- Length: 39:27
- Label: Atlantic
- Producers: Tony "Champagne" Silvester, Bert "Super Charts" De Coteaux

Ben E. King chronology
The Beginning of It All (1972)	Supernatural (1975)	I Had a Love (1976)

Singles from Supernatural
- 1. "Supernatural Thing" Released: January 1975; 2. "Do It in the Name of Love" Released: May 1975

Supernatural is the eighth studio album and ninth album overall by American soul and R&B singer Ben E. King. Released in 1975, it marked King's transition to the main Atlantic Records label after time on subsidiary labels. The single "Supernatural Thing" brought him a return to chart success, reaching No. 1 on the Billboard Hot Soul Singles and peaking at No. 5 on the Billboard Hot 100. The title track and other tracks on the album featured King singing in a higher key as second tenor, rather than his usual baritone.

== Track listing ==
All tracks are written by Haras Fyre and Gwen Guthrie, except where noted.

Side One
No.	Title	Writer(s)	Length
1.	"Supernatural Thing Part 1"		3:54
2.	"Supernatural Thing Part 2"		3:14
3.	"Your Lovin' Ain't Good Enough"		5:00
4.	"Drop My Heart Off"	Sam Dees; Frederick Knight	4:17
5.	"Extra Extra"	Dees	3:48

Side Two
No.	Title	Writer(s)	Length
6.	"Do It In the Name of Love"		4:20
7.	"Happiness Is Where You Find It"	Bettye Crutcher; Dees; Knight	3:35
8.	"Do You Wanna Do a Thing"	Jesse Boyce; Richard Griffith; Sanchez Harley	4:24
9.	"Imagination"	Ben E. King; Ben E. King, Jr.	3:38
10.	"What Do You Want Me To Do"	Lou Courtney	3:17

== Personnel ==
- Ben E. King - vocals
- Carlos Alomar, Jerry Friedman, Jeff Mironov - guitar
- Bob Babbitt, Jerry Jemmott - bass guitar
- Bert De Coteaux, Derek Smith, Ricky Williams - keyboards
- Jimmy Young - drums
- Carlos Martin - congas
- George Devens, Jack Jennings, Phil Kraus, Ted Sommers - percussion
- Brenda White, Gwen Guthrie, Lani Groves, Yvonne Guthrie - background vocals
- Bob Clearmountain, Ron St. Germain, Tony "No. 1" Bongiovi - engineer
