= Intuition (Angela Bofill album) =

Studio album by Angela Bofill
- Released: October 12, 1988
- Recorded: 1988
- Genre: R&B, Quiet Storm, Smooth Jazz
- Label: Capitol
- Producer: Vincent Brantley, Norman Connors, Angela Bofill

Angela Bofill chronology
Tell Me Tomorrow (1985)	Intuition (1988)	I Wanna Love Somebody (1993)

Singles from Intuition
- 1. "I Just Wanna Stop / Everlasting Love" Released: October 20, 1988; 2. "Love Is in Your Eyes / I Just Wanna Stop" Released: March 11, 1989

Intuition is the eighth album by American singer-songwriter Angela Bofill, and was her first and only release on Capitol Records in 1988. It was produced by Norman Connors. The album peaked at No. 38 on the Billboard 200 chart on January 6, 1989, and stayed on the chart for 20 weeks. The album also reached No. 50 on the Billboard Top Black Albums chart.

Bofill recorded "For You and I", a song she performed live at Avery Fisher Hall, Lincoln Center in 1980 as a duet with Peabo Bryson.

In 2013, "Intuition" was re-released as an expanded edition with extra tracks, including "Fragile, Handle with Care".

== Background ==
After the release of her second album, Angel of the Night, Bofill took three years to raise her daughter, now four at the time of the release of Intuition. During that time she continued to tour, playing clubs including Blues Alley in Washington D.C. and the Blue Note in New York, and performing at jazz festivals and in the UK.

Bofill was quoted saying "This is the real Angie," and looking back on her identity as a recording artist, she reflected:

"Maybe I was the first Latin lady to make records that were pop/R&B crossover!"

Bofill had worked with Bryson previously saying they "go way back", having performed on a television special, a Black Music Association concert in New York, and extensive touring together, "so it seemed so natural for us to make a record together now."

== Production ==
Bofill recorded Intuition with Norman Connors and Vincent Brantley producing, along with two tracks she produced herself.

Connors produced the first single "I Just Wanna Stop" (written by Ross Vannelli and originally performed by Gino Vannelli), "Long Gone", "In Your Lovers Eyes" and the duet "For You and I" with Peabo Bryson. Vincent Brantley produced five tracks while Bofill produced "Fragile, Handle with Care" and "Love Overtime".

== Release and reception ==
Billboard gave a review on songs on the album: "Delicate yet self-assured vocals on the sassy title track, the seductive "Long Gone" and the jazzy "Special Lover"...features...". Gino Vannelli's 'I Just Wanna Stop' and a Peabo Bryson duet on "For You and I."

A Radio & Records review of Intuition praised the album and Bofill calling her "a statuesque, beautiful woman with a spectacular voice and dramatic style" describing "an album of variety and warmth" with "appeal to Urban, AC, and CHR formats."

Billboard Single Reviews, Black, Picks, on the release of "I Just Wanna Stop" wrote: "Bofill is graceful captured on this jazz-inflected rendition."

== Track listing ==
No.	Title	Writer(s)	Length
1.	"Love Is in Your Eyes"	Delisa Davis; Tsuyoshi Takayanagi	5:10
2.	"Intuition"	Jeff Carruthers; Juana Merceron; Mel Lewis	5:29
3.	"I Just Wanna Stop"	Ross Vannelli	4:31
4.	"Long Gone"	Octavia Oestricher; Zane Mark	6:06
5.	"For You and I"	Eddie del Barrio; Roxanne Seeman	4:00
6.	"Fragile, Handle with Care"	Angela Bofill	4:03
7.	"In Your Lover's Eyes"	Jacques Burvick	6:15
8.	"Love Overtime"	Bofill	4:32
9.	"Festival/Down the Line"	Harvey Bruce; Carruthers; Vincent Brantley	5:53
10.	"Special Lover"	Ken Hirsch; Phil Cody	4:37
11.	"Everlasting Love"	Carruthers; Brantley	3:48
Total length:			54:30
