= Angie (Angela Bofill album) =

Studio album by Angela Bofill
- Released: November 1, 1978
- Recorded: 1977–1978
- Studios: Electric Lady Studios, A&R Studios
- Genre: R&B
- Length: 39:35
- Label: GRP
- Producers: Dave Grusin, Larry Rosen

Angela Bofill chronology
Angie (1978)	Angel of the Night (1979)

Singles from Angie
- 1. "This Time I'll Be Sweeter / Baby, I Need Your Love" Released: November 21, 1978

Angie is the debut album by American R&B singer Angela Bofill. It was produced by the GRP Records label heads Dave Grusin and Larry Rosen. It was released in 1978 on the GRP label; a digitally remastered version was released on Buddah Records in 2001.

== Reception ==
Professional ratings
Review scores
Source	Rating
AllMusic	4/5 stars

The album was heralded as a mild success, popularizing on some of the themes of the times. The song "This Time I'll Be Sweeter" charted fairly well on the U.S. R&B front. Being the first of her kind to do so, Bofill's sophisticated vocals would prove to have an effect on the jazz, Latin and urban contemporary music audiences of the time.

== Track listing ==
All songs were written by Angela Bofill, unless stated otherwise.

No.	Title	Writer(s)	Length
1.	"Under the Moon and Over the Sky"		5:45
2.	"This Time I'll Be Sweeter"	Gwen Guthrie; Patrick Grant	4:21
3.	"Baby, I Need Your Love"		4:14
4.	"Rough Times"	Nickolas Ashford; Valerie Simpson	4:41
5.	"The Only Thing I Would Wish For"		4:26
6.	"Summer Days"	Timothy Blixseth	5:09
7.	"Share Your Love"	Derrik Hoitsma	5:14
8.	"Children of the World United"		5:51

== Personnel ==
- Angela Bofill - lead and backing vocals
- Dave Grusin - electric piano, piano, percussion
- Eric Gale - electric guitar
- Buddy Williams, Steve Gadd - drums
- Dave Valentin - flute, bass guitar
- Richard Resnicoff - acoustic guitar
- George Young - alto saxophone on "Share Your Love"
- Ralph MacDonald - Roger Squitero - percussion
- Eddie Daniels, George Young, Howard Johnson, Jim Pugh, Irvin "Marky" Markowitz, Marvin Stamm, Michael Brecker, Phil Bodner, Walt Levinsky - horns
- Barry Finclair, Charles Libove, Charles McCracken, Diana Halprin, Emanuel Vardi, Harry Cykman, John Pintavalle, Jonathan Abramowitz, Lamar Alsop, Matthew Raimondi, Max Ellen, Paul Gershman, Richard Sortomme - strings
- Arthur Woodley, Cheryl Freeman, Clara Antoine, Dance Theater of Harlem Choral Ensemble, Irma LaGuerre, Lorraine Baucum, Raj McIntyre, Stacy Gaines, Sylvia Bhourne, Wilbur Archie - choir
- David Nadien - concertmaster
- Gwen Guthrie, Patti Austin, Vivian Cherry - backing vocals

"This album is dedicated to my little nephew Pas and to all the children of the world. . .that they grow up knowing the true meaning of love."

== Charts ==
Chart (1979)	Peak position
US Top LPs & Tape (Billboard)	47
US Soul LPs (Billboard)	20
US Jazz LPs (Billboard)	5
Canada Top 100 (RPM)	69

=== Singles ===
Year	Single	Chart positions
Year	Single	US R&B
1979	"This Time I'll Be Sweeter"	23
