= Richard Hickox =

English conductor

Richard Hickox CBE
- Born: Richard Sidney Hickox; 5 March 1948; Stokenchurch, Buckinghamshire, England
- Died: 23 November 2008 (aged 60); Swansea, Wales
- Education: Royal Academy of Music; Queens' College, Cambridge
- Occupations: Conductor of choir, orchestra opera music
- Children: 3

Richard Sidney Hickox CBE (5 March 1948 – 23 November 2008) was an English conductor of choral, orchestral and operatic music.

== Early life and education ==
Hickox was born in Stokenchurch in Buckinghamshire into a musical family. After attending the Royal Grammar School, High Wycombe from 1959 to 1966, he studied at the Royal Academy of Music in London from 1966 to 1967, then was an organ scholar at Queens' College, Cambridge, from 1967 to 1970.

== Career ==
In 1967, while his father was Vicar of Wooburn, Buckinghamshire, Hickox founded the Wooburn Festival and eventually became its president. The festival still takes place and features music, drama and the visual arts. Hickox also founded the Wooburn Singers and continued as conductor until succeeded by Stephen Jackson.

From 1970 to 1971 Hickox was director of music at Maidenhead Grammar School (later Desborough School). He founded the City of London Sinfonia in 1971, remaining music director until his death, and also founded the Richard Hickox Singers and Orchestra in the same year. The Richard Hickox Singers are featured on Kate Bush's album Hounds of Love on the song "Hello Earth"; the choral section is the Georgian folk song "Tsintskaro".

Hickox was the St Endellion Festival's artistic director from 1972 until his death in 2008. The St. Endellion Festivals at the St. Endellion Collegiate Church near Port Isaac, Cornwall expanded and strengthened during his thirty years of artistic direction, with many renowned musicians participating and an Easter Festival during Holy Week created in 1974. Hickox' son Adam Hickox is a conductor for the St. Endellion Easter Festival for 2024.

In 1972, aged 24, he was appointed Martin Neary's successor as organist and master of music at St. Margaret's, Westminster (the church of the Houses of Parliament), subsequently adding the directorships of the London Symphony Chorus (1976) and Bradford Festival Choral Society (1978). From 1982 to 1990, he served as artistic director of the Northern Sinfonia, subsequently named as conductor emeritus. He was Associate Guest Conductor of the London Symphony Orchestra from 1985 until his death. He was Chorus Director of the London Symphony Chorus from 1976 to 1991, with whom he premiered The Three Kings by Peter Maxwell Davies in 1995. He premiered A Dance on the Hill in 2005, by the same composer. His repertoire included over 100 first performances.

In 1990, he co-founded the baroque orchestra Collegium Musicum 90 with Simon Standage. For five years, Hickox was music director of the Spoleto Festival, Italy. From 2000 to 2006, he was principal conductor of the BBC National Orchestra of Wales, thereafter becoming its conductor emeritus.

He became music director of Opera Australia in 2005. In this role he conducted the Australian premieres of The Love for Three Oranges, Rusalka, and Arabella (which won the prestigious Helpmann Award for Best Opera in 2008). He collaborated on new productions of The Tales of Hoffmann and Alcina. CD recordings of The Love for Three Oranges and Rusalka were released by Chandos and received positive reviews in the international and local press. Hickox also led major revivals, including Tannhäuser, Death in Venice, Giulio Cesare, Billy Budd, and Janáček's The Makropulos Affair.

In 2008, singers Fiona Janes and Bruce Martin, both principal artists with Opera Australia, but who felt they had not been given appropriate roles, left the organisation, criticising Hickox and the Opera Australia board for what they saw as declines in artistic standards.

Hickox was contracted as Opera Australia's music director through to 2012 at the time of his death in November 2008.

Hickox was appointed a Commander of the Order of the British Empire (CBE) in the 2002 Queen's Birthday Honours. His recording repertoire concentrated on British music, in which he made a number of recording premieres for Chandos Records (he made over 280 recordings for this company). In 1997 he won the Grammy Award for Best Opera Recording for his recording of Benjamin Britten's Peter Grimes.

He garnered five Gramophone Awards: for recordings of Britten's War Requiem (1992); Frederick Delius's Sea Drift (1994); William Walton's Troilus and Cressida (1995); the original 1913 version of Ralph Vaughan Williams' A London Symphony (2001 Record of the Year and Best Orchestral Disc); and Charles Villiers Stanford's Songs of the Sea (2006 Editor's Choice). He made only the second recording of Delius's Requiem (1996).

He was awarded a Doctorate of Music from Durham University in 2003 and was an Honorary Fellow of Queens' College, Cambridge. He received two Royal Philharmonic Society Music Awards, the first Sir Charles Groves Award, the Evening Standard Opera Award and the Association of British Orchestras Award. He was President of the Elgar Society.

== Death ==
On 23 November 2008, during a recording session of Holst's First Choral Symphony for Chandos, Hickox was taken ill and died in Swansea from a dissecting thoracic aneurysm. He had been scheduled to conduct a new production of Vaughan Williams' Riders to the Sea at English National Opera later that month.

A memorial service was held at Queens' College, Cambridge, on 26 November 2008, with music conducted by Sir David Willcocks. A service of Thanksgiving took place in St Paul's Cathedral, London on 12 March 2009.

Brett Dean dedicated the fifth movement of his "Epitaph for string quintet (viola quintet) (2010)" in memory of Richard Hickox who was the conductor of the premiere of Dean's first opera, Bliss.

== Personal life ==
Hickox was married three times. In 1970 he married Julia Smith: the marriage was dissolved in 1976. His second marriage to Frances Sheldon-Williams produced a son, the singer-songwriter Tom Hickox. That marriage was also dissolved. His third marriage was to the contralto Pamela Helen Stephen with two offspring - Adam and Abigail. His son Adam became an assistant conductor in Rotterdam in 2019. Pamela Helen Stephen died on 30 November 2021.

Cultural offices
Preceded by None	Music Director, City of London Sinfonia; 1971–2008	Succeeded by Stephen Layton
Preceded by Tamás Vásáry and Iván Fischer	Artistic Director, Music Director and Principal Conductor, Northern Sinfonia; 1982–1990	Succeeded by Heinrich Schiff
Preceded by Mark Wigglesworth	Principal Conductor, BBC National Orchestra of Wales; 2000–2006	Succeeded by Thierry Fischer
Preceded by Simone Young	Music Director, Opera Australia; 2005–2008	Succeeded by Lyndon Terracini
