= I Had a Love (album) =

Studio album by Ben E. King
- Released: 1976
- Genre: Soul
- Length: 36:09
- Label: Atlantic
- Producer: Norman Harris

Ben E. King chronology
Supernatural (1975)	I Had a Love (1976)	Rhapsody (1976)

Professional ratings
Review scores
Source	Rating
AllMusic	3/5 stars
The Encyclopedia of Popular Music	2/5 stars
The New Rolling Stone Record Guide	1/5 stars

I Had a Love is a studio album by Ben E. King, released in 1976. "I Had a Love" and "I Betcha Didn't Know That" were released as singles. "I Had a Love" peaked at No. 23 on the Billboard Hot R&B/Hip-Hop Songs chart.

== Production ==
"I Had a Love" was written by Valerie Simpson and Nickolas Ashford.

== Track listing ==
1. "I Had a Love" (Nickolas Ashford, Valerie Simpson) [3:37]
2. "I Betcha Didn't Know That" (Frederick Knight, Sam Dees) [4:46]
3. "Smooth Sailing" (Allan Felder) [3:18]
4. "No Danger Ahead" (Sam Dees) [4:11]
5. "Everybody Plays the Fool" (J.R. Bailey, Ken Williams, Rudy Clark) [5:21]
6. "Standing In the Wings of Heartache" (Clinton Moon, Sam Dees) [3:27]
7. "We Got Love" (Allan Felder, Bruce Gray, Norman Harris, T.G. Conway) [3:58]
8. "Tower of Strength" (Bettye Crutcher, Frederick Knight, Sam Dees) [3:46]
9. "You're Stepping on My Heart (Tearing My World Apart)" (Gwen Guthrie, Patrick Grant) [3:45]
