= Utah Saints =

English electronic music group

- Utah Saints performing a live set in 2023

Background information
- Origin: Harrogate, North Yorkshire, England
- Genres: Stadium house; electronic; house; big beat; Hip-hop; trance; trip hop
- Years active: 1991–present
- Labels: London, Echo, Ministry of Sound
- Members: Jez Willis; Tim Garbutt
- Past members: Keith Langley; Lee Dyson; Pellegrino Riccardi
- Website: utahsaints.com

Utah Saints are an English electronic music duo consisting of members Jez Willis and Tim Garbutt. The band had three top-ten and another five top-40 singles on the UK Singles Chart in the 1990s, as well as number-one dance tracks in the UK and US. They were notable for pioneering use of sampling technology, in particular, their practice of manipulating samples from mainstream pop, rock, R&B and soul songs and combining them with contrasting dance beats, using the samples in a new context. The band wrote, produced and mixed all of their own music. The duo were joined on stage by additional musicians when they played live from 1991 to 2001. They were one of the first electronic groups to play as a live collective and supported both the Shamen and U2 live at 10 stadium shows. Since then the duo have performed live sets themselves.

Utah Saints ran clubs from 1988 to 1994, particularly Ricky's and The Gallery (later the Pleasure Rooms). They booked new DJs, including Pete Tong, Carl Cox, Paul Oakenfold, Sasha, Justice, Annie Mac and Zane Lowe. They then ran their own Sugarbeat club night from 1998 to 2010 in Leeds, Edinburgh and London, booking a diverse range of acts such as Soulwax, Erol Alkan, Felix Da Housecat, Zane Lowe, Annie Mac and Tiga. They continue to book electronic acts and DJs, curating a stage at Beatherder Festival for three days every year since 2007.

They had five further UK top 40 singles including a top 10 between 2000 and 2012, and continue to produce music, DJ in clubs and at festivals, promote nights, curate festival stages and write music for film, trailers and games.

== Biography ==
Utah Saints were described as "the first true stadium house band" by the KLF's Bill Drummond, though their music is difficult to place into one genre. The dance group originally met as music promoters and DJs for the Mix Nightclub in Harrogate in the early 1990s. They began as MDMA (Mega Dance Metal Allegiance), featuring two former The Cassandra Complex members Jez Willis and Keith Langley, along with Bobby Rae and guitarist Martin Scott. Willis started The Utah Saints with the addition of Tim Garbutt. Langley played the drums with the band in the early days and has provided artwork and photography for a number of their releases.

They first had chart success under the name Utah Saints with the singles "What Can You Do for Me" (UK No. 10), "Something Good" (their biggest UK success at No. 4) and "Believe in Me", a UK No. 8 chart hit, which they described as their vocal sample trilogy. "What Can You Do for Me" featured samples from Eurythmics' "There Must Be An Angel (Playing With My Heart)" and Gwen Guthrie's "Ain't Nothin' Goin' on But the Rent". "Something Good" heavily sampled Kate Bush's "Cloudbusting" and "Believe in Me" was based on "Love Action" by Human League and "You Gave Me Love" by Crown Heights Affair. The fourth single "I Want You" was based around a sample from the Slayer song "War Ensemble".

Contrary to rumours, the band was not sued by Kate Bush over the use of a sample from Bush's track "Cloudbusting", in the Utah Saints track "Something Good" – the sample was legally cleared before use. Additionally, Bush sold Utah Saints footage from the video of her original song. This track, with new vocals by the singer and actress Davina Perera, experienced a revival in the clubs in 2008 and reached No. 1 on UK Dance Chart. The track featured new remixes by Van She, High Contrast, Prok & Fitch, eSquire, Ian Carey and more.

Utah Saints then moved away from vocal samples with singles such as "I Want You" (sampling thrash metal band Slayer) and "I Still Think of You" (Jez Willis providing original vocals on both). The latter was on the soundtrack to the film Shopping and DJ Tim briefly appears in the film Utah Saints also had three songs — "Hands Up", "Techknowledgy" and "Sick" — featured in the hit video game Carmageddon TDR2000. Their song "Sick" was included on the 2002 PlayStation 2 soundtrack Wipeout Fusion. Another single, "Power To The Beats" featured on the FIFA 2001 football game.

After their debut album, the self-titled Utah Saints, and one further single "Ohio", which was based around samples from the Jocelyn Brown song "Somebody Else's Guy" and "That's The Way I Like It" by KC & the Sunshine Band, Utah Saints seemed to disappear for several years. They were busy doing remixes (for artists including Blondie, The Human League, Hawkwind, Simple Minds, James, Annie Lennox and The Osmonds and the theme to the 1995 movie Mortal Kombat), and producing tracks for other artists such as Terrorvision. During this time, they recorded an album that was to be called 'Wired World' but was never released, and produced a handful of tracks that have not been released, with titles such as "Star", "Train" and "Rock".

The Utah Saints then took a break, saying that they stopped before they got into a vicious cycle of people expecting them to come up with hits, and instead write music they wanted to hear. Garbutt toured the United States with Orbital, Moby and Aphex Twin, whilst Willis appeared on the dance music radio station Kiss 105 in Yorkshire, hosting a popular Sunday night show on the history of dance music.

They reappeared in late 1999 with charting singles "Love Song" and "Funky Music Sho' 'Nuff Turns Me On" (featuring Edwin Starr on guest vocals), plus "Power to the Beats" and "Lost Vagueness" (featuring Chrissie Hynde). They also issued the album, Two, which included samples from Michael Stipe from R.E.M., Joyce Sims, and a track with a sample from Metallica - the first time a sample had been cleared by the band, with featured vocals by Chuck D from Public Enemy, and Edwin Starr

In 2000, Utah Saints did the soundtrack for the video game Carmageddon TDR2000 along with "Power to the Beats" being featured on FIFA 2001. In 2001, they supported Feeder on the second leg of their UK tour with a DJ set. In 2002, they went quiet again, resurfacing in 2008 with a single release.

They have been working on projects under other names, such as BeatVandals, as well as developing their regular Leeds and Edinburgh-based club night 'SugarBeatClub'. They opened a new recording studio on the outskirts of Leeds with fellow Leeds DJs and producers Riley & Durrant in 2008.

In 2007, their hit "Something Good" was remixed by Australian producers Van She. Originally a bootleg, the Utah Saints approved it and facilitated a re-record with a new vocal performance, overseeing final production and edits. It was signed to the Ministry of Sound record label, who released it in January 2008, where it reached No. 8 in the UK chart – their second biggest chart success, behind the original version of "Something Good". The video for "Something Good 08" featured people doing the "running man" dance that was originally performed by MC Hammer. The track was the most played single in 2008 on BBC Radio 1.

Released on iTunes on 11 January 2009 was the Utah Saints' club mix of Girls Aloud's "The Loving Kind". In November 2009, the band produced a remix of the Liverpool-based dance duo Killaflaw's "Set Me on Fire". This formed part of Killaflaw's third single and was made available digitally in December of that year. Utah Saints remixed the band "Bring Me The Horizon" the same year.

In August 2010, Utah Saints announced the launch of a new record label called Sugarbeat. The first release was Santero's "Drop the Bomb". Utah Saints played the Together Winter Music Festival in London at the Alexandra Palace on 26 November 2010. Then went to play Beat-Herder festival, on the Toiltrees stage, in 2012.

In 2012, "What Can You Do for Me" was remixed by drum and bass duo Drumsound & Bassline Smith. Utah Saints then added to the remix and the track became a collaboration, received airplay, entered the top 10 on the dance chart and the top 30 in the national chart. Hervé and Tantrum Desire provided new 2012 remixes for the song, the remix by Herve was made to sound like a remix of the original 1990s single, so Herve cut out the new material performed by Drumsound & Bassline Smith. "What Can You Do for Me" peaked at No. 28 on the UK Singles Chart. It was included on the 2012 edition of Ministry of Sound's Addicted To Bass series. The Cut-Up Boys mashed up "What Can You Do for Me" with "Midnight Run" by Example and Feed Me.

In 2015, Utah Saints released one copy of a work in progress track titled "Swansong D'Amour" which was played on BBC by Mistajam.

Utah Saints revealed on Twitter in October 2021 that they captured crowd noises from fans celebrating the Toronto Blue Jays victory during the 1992 World Series over the Atlanta Braves. The band says they captured these sounds and incorporated them into performance.

== Band members ==
- Tim Garbutt – born 6 January 1969, London
- Jez Willis – born 14 August 1963, Brampton, Cumberland

== Discography ==
=== Studio albums ===
Title	Album details	Peak chart positions						Certifications
Title	Album details	UK	AUS	CAN	FIN	US	US Heat	Certifications
Utah Saints	Released: May 1993; Label: FFRR Records	10	111	49	38	165	6	BPI: Silver
Two	Released: October 2000; Label: Echo	—	—	—	—	—	—	
"—" denotes items that did not chart or were not released in that territory.

=== Extended plays ===
Title	EP details	Peak chart positions	
Title	EP details	US	US Heat
Something Good	Released: 1992; Label: London	182	6

=== Singles ===
Year	Title	Peak chart positions										Certifications	Album
Year	Title	UK	AUS	FIN	GER	IRE	ITA	NLD	NZ	SWE	US	Certifications	Album
1991	"What Can You Do for Me"	10	90	—	—	16	23	—	—	35	—		Utah Saints
1992	"Something Good"	4	10	10	—	4	—	—	42	—	98	ARIA: Gold	Utah Saints
1993	"Believe in Me"	8	92	15	100	9	—	—	—	20	—		Utah Saints
1993	"I Want You"	25	—	—	—	25	—	—	—	—	—		Utah Saints
1994	"I Still Think of You"	32	—	—	—	—	—	—	—	—	—		Non-album singles
1995	"Ohio"	42	145	—	—	—	—	—	—	—	—		Non-album singles
2000	"Love Song"	37	—	—	—	—	—	—	—	—	—		Two
2000	"Funky Music" (featuring Edwin Starr)	23	—	—	—	—		—	—	—	—		Two
2000	"Power to the Beats" (featuring Chuck D)	—	—	—	—	—	—	—	—	—	—		Two
2001	"Lost Vagueness" (featuring Chrissie Hynde)	—	—	—	—	—	—	—	—	—	—		Two
2008	"Something Good '08"	8	32	—	—	22	—	29	—	—	—	BPI: Silver	Non-album singles
2010	"Getting Better" (with Ian Watkins)	—	—	—	—	—	—	—	—	—	—		Non-album singles
2012	"What Can You Do for Me" (with Drumsound & Bassline Smith)	28	—	—	—	—	—	—	—	—	—		Non-album singles
2013	"I Got 5 on It" (with Rory Lyons)	—	—	—	—	—	—	—	—	—	—		Non-album singles
"—" denotes items that did not chart or were not released in that territory.
