= Mother Stands for Comfort =

Song by Kate Bush

from the album Hounds of Love
- Released: 16 September 1985
- Recorded: 1984–1985
- Studio: Wickham Farm Home Studio (Welling, Kent)
- Genre: Art pop, avant-pop, chamber pop
- Length: 3:07
- Label: EMI
- Songwriter: Kate Bush
- Producer: Kate Bush

Kate Bush singles chronology
"The Big Sky"	"Mother Stands for Comfort"	"Cloudbusting"

"Mother Stands for Comfort" is a song by English singer-songwriter Kate Bush, released on 16 September 1985 as the fourth track on Side One of her fifth studio album, Hounds of Love. Recorded at her private 48-track home studio in Kent, the track serves as the most minimalist and tonally restrained piece on the album's first side, positioned between the kinetic art rock of "The Big Sky" and the orchestral pop of "Cloudbusting".

The song subverts traditional maternal archetypes by depicting an unfeeling murderer who relies on his mother's unconditional love to shelter him from prosecution. Built upon a sparse kick-and-snare rhythm, Fairlight CMI domestic sound effects, and a prominent fretless double bass line by German jazz musician Eberhard Weber, the track is one of the few pieces from Hounds of Love that Bush has never performed live in concert.

== Background and themes ==
Lyrically, "Mother Stands for Comfort" addresses maternal love pushed to a moral extreme, exploring how maternal instinct can supersede legal and ethical considerations. The narrator speaks from the perspective of an unremorseful individual who has committed a violent crime and uses his mother's silence as an alibi:

"Mother stands for comfort / Mother will hide the murderer / Mother hides the madman / Mother will stay mum."

In a 1992 interview with Richard Skinner for BBC Radio 1's Classic Albums series, Bush detailed the narrative dynamic:

"Well, the personality that sings this track is very unfeeling in a way. And the cold qualities of synths and machines were appropriate here. There are many different kinds of love and the track's really talking about the love of a mother, and in this case she's the mother of a murderer, in that she's basically prepared to protect her son against anything. 'Cause in a way it's also suggesting that the son is using the mother, as much as the mother is protecting him. It's a bit of a strange matter, isn't it really?"

Critics and commentators have noted the psychological tension in Bush's framing of domestic sanctuary, drawing thematic comparisons to psychological thrillers such as Alfred Hitchcock's Psycho (1960).

== Composition and sound design ==
The arrangement of "Mother Stands for Comfort" is the most stripped-down on Hounds of Love. The foundation consists of an unembellished, metronomic kick-and-snare drum machine pattern, creating a cold, mechanical tempo designed to reflect the narrator's emotional detachment.

=== Harmonic structure ===
Harmonically, the track moves through modal and minor progressions featuring inverted slash chords (predominantly E♭m, D♭/F, and G♭), avoiding traditional pop cadence resolutions. The circular chord motion mirrors the protagonist's recurring inner panic and moral claustrophobia ("It breaks the cage, and fear escapes and takes possession / Just like a crowd rioting inside").

=== Eberhard Weber's fretless bass ===
A central element of the track is the acoustic and fretless upright double bass provided by ECM jazz bassist Eberhard Weber. Instead of fulfilling a standard rhythmic bass role, Weber's customized 5-string instrument functions as a melodic counterweight to Bush's voice. His expressive glissandi, high-register lyricism, and sustained sustain lend an organic, melancholy character to the synthesized rhythm.

=== Fairlight CMI sampling ===
Bush used the Fairlight CMI to embed tactile sound design into the track. The arrangement includes samples of shattering glass, slamming doors, and percussive breathing. The shattering glass motif recalls similar sample experiments Bush employed on her 1980 single "Babooshka", while serving here to punctuate the atmosphere of domestic threat.

== Critical assessment and live status ==
Retrospective reviews have highlighted "Mother Stands for Comfort" as an essential atmospheric counterweight on Side One of Hounds of Love, providing a dark, chamber-pop interlude between the larger-scale arrangements of "The Big Sky" and "Cloudbusting". Contemporary art pop musicians, including Spellling, have cited the song's ambient soundscapes and eerie production as an influence.

Bush has never performed "Mother Stands for Comfort" in concert. When she returned to the stage in 2014 for her 22-date residency Before the Dawn at the Hammersmith Apollo—where the entire Ninth Wave suite and most of Side One were staged—"Mother Stands for Comfort" and "The Big Sky" were the only two tracks from Hounds of Love omitted from the setlist.

== Cover versions ==
The song has been reinterpreted across several genres:

- Jane Birkin: Recorded an acoustic chamber-pop interpretation for her 2006 studio album Fictions, arranged with minimalist strings and her signature soft vocal delivery.
- The Security Project (featuring Happy Rhodes): Performed live arrangements accentuating the song's complex bass dynamics.
- Kat Devlin: Contributed an ambient folk version to the tribute compilation Kate Bush Covered.
- Other artists: Recorded by acts including Cauac Sky, E-Clypse (feat. Emma Price), Goodknight Productions, Isadar, The Kate Bush Experience, Yuri Kono, Murder of Crows, Brian Seabolt, and TM Collective.

== Personnel ==
Credits adapted from the Hounds of Love liner notes and the Kate Bush Encyclopedia:

- Kate Bush – lead and backing vocals, piano, Fairlight CMI synthesizer, production
- Eberhard Weber – fretless double bass
- Stuart Elliott – drums, percussion
- Del Palmer – LinnDrum programming
- Brian Bath – backing vocals
- Haydn Bendall – recording engineer

== See also ==
- Kate Bush discography
