= Teaser (Angela Bofill album) =

Studio album by Angela Bofill
- Released: October 27, 1983
- Recorded: 1983
- Genre: R&B; soul; dance-pop
- Label: Arista
- Producer: Narada Michael Walden; Denny Diante

Angela Bofill chronology
Too Tough (1983)	Teaser (1983)	Let Me Be the One (1984)

Singles from Teaser
- 1. "I'm On Your Side / Gotta Make It Up to You" Released: October 18, 1983; 2. "Special Delivery / Gotta Make It Up to You" Released: March 15, 1984

Professional ratings
Review scores
Source	Rating
AllMusic	3/5 stars

Teaser is the fifth studio album by American R&B singer Angela Bofill, released on October 27, 1983 by Arista Records. The album cover was credited to Mick Rock.

== Track listing ==
No.	Title	Writer(s)	Length
1.	"Special Delivery"	Jeffrey Cohen; Narada Michael Walden; Preston Glass	4:54
2.	"Call of the Wild"	Richard Wolf; Wayne Perkins	5:00
3.	"Nothin' But a Teaser"	Alan Glass; Walden; P. Glass	4:44
4.	"I'm On Your Side"	Angela Bofill; Cohen; Walden	5:05
5.	"Penetration"	Cohen; Walden	5:57
6.	"You're a Special Part of Me" (feat. Johnny Mathis)	Bofill; Loree Gold	4:28
7.	"Still a Thrill"	P. Glass; Walden	4:53
8.	"Gotta Make It Up to You"	Bofill; Cohen; Walden	5:14
9.	"Crazy for Him"	Ellen Schwartz; Gold; Roger Bruno	3:18

== Personnel ==
- Angela Bofill - lead and backing vocals
- Narada Michael Walden - drums, keyboards, percussion
- Jorge Bermudez - Percussion
- Michel Colombier, David Sancious - keyboards
- John Robinson - drums
- Randy Jackson, Abe Laboriel - bass guitar
- Corrado Rustici, David Williams - guitar
- Marc Russo - saxophone
- Frank Martin - vocoder
- Preston Glass - church bells
- Boni Boyer, Bunny Hull, Edward Hawkins, Jim Gilstrap, John Lehman, Linette Hawkins, Preston Glass, Tramaine Hawkins, Walter Hawkins - backing vocals
- Michael Gibbs - string arrangements

== Charts ==
Year	Chart positions	
Year	US	US R&B
1983	81	20
