= Something Good (Utah Saints song) =

1992 single by Utah Saints

Single by Utah Saints

from the album Utah Saints
- Released: 25 May 1992
- Length: 5:52
- Label: FFRR
- Songwriters: Kate Bush; Jez Willis
- Producer: Utah Saints

Utah Saints singles chronology
"What Can You Do for Me" (1991)	"Something Good" (1992)	"Believe in Me" (1993)

Music video
- "Something Good" on YouTube

"Something Good '08"

Single by Utah Saints
- Released: 10 March 2008
- Length: 2:44
- Label: Data; Ministry of Sound
- Songwriters: Kate Bush; Jez Willis
- Producer: Utah Saints

Utah Saints singles chronology
"Lost Vagueness" (2000)	"Something Good '08" (2008)	"What Can You Do for Me vs. Drumsound and Bassline Smith" (2012)

"Something Good" is a song by English electronic music duo Utah Saints. It was first included as the opening song on a seven-track EP titled Something Good, then later included on their debut album, Utah Saints (1992). The song contains a vocal sample from Kate Bush's "Cloudbusting", which had been a top-20 UK hit in 1985. Issued as a single on 25 May 1992, it reached number four on the UK Singles Chart as well as number seven on the US Billboard Dance Club Play chart. The BBC used the song during its coverage of the Opening Ceremony of the Barcelona Olympic Games of 1992 and was also used for Carlton Television's pre-launch trailer.

In 2007, the track was remixed by Australian band Van She under their electro remix pseudonym, "Van She Tech", and released in March 2008 as "Something Good '08" with a new music video. Bush's vocal sample was re-recorded by Davina Perera—a West End singer/actress and former Pop Idol contestant—but remained the focal point of the song. The remix entered the top 10 on downloads alone, climbing to number eight on the UK Singles Chart after the CD release. It was the band's first top-20 hit in 15 years.

== Critical reception ==
In May 1992, Jon Wilde from Melody Maker wrote, "Kate Bush's ravishing 'Cloudbusting' sampled to good effect and transformed into a whirligig electro swirl that is packed with the kind of lecherous tics that are always guaranteed to separate this kind of stuff from the massed ranks of the frighteningly ordinary." In 2022, Rolling Stone magazine ranked "Something Good" number 134 in their list of the "200 Greatest Dance Songs of All Time".

== "Something Good '08" music video ==
The music video for "Something Good '08", set in a Cardiff bar on St David's Day 1989, and featuring the 'Running Man' dance, was directed by Eran Creevy and choreographed by Kate Prince of ZooNation. It featured lead dancer Anthony Trahearn, dancers Jessica Grist and Simone Edwards, Lee Toomes as the DJ and Matthew Medland as Benjamin Pew. Jez Willis and Tim Garbutt of Utah Saints cameo in the video, as the pool players standing in front of the pool table. In the music video, the main dancer is wearing a pair of Nike Air Jordan 3s with the red colorway.

The video won the category for Best Dance Video at the UK Music Video Awards 2008. In 2017, Complex.com placed it at number 78 in "The Best Music Videos of the 2000s".

== Track listings ==
- "Something Good" (1992 UK CD single)
1. "Something Good" (7-inch) – 3:33
2. "Something Good" (12-inch) – 5:58
3. "Something Good" (051 Mix) – 5:47
4. "Trance Atlantic Flight" – 7:09
- "Something Good" (1992 US single)
1. "Something Good" – 5:55
2. "Anything Can Happen" – 3:12
3. "What Can You Do for Me" – 6:06
4. "Trance Atlantic Flight" – 7:08
5. "Trance Europe Caress" – 5:01
6. "Something Good" (051 Mix by John Kelley) – 5:45
7. "What Can You Do for Me" (Salt Lake Mix) – 5:53
- "Something Good '08" (2008 UK CD maxi single)
1. "Something Good '08" (radio edit) – 2:44
2. "Something Good '08" (Van She Tech Mix)
3. "Something Good '08" (High Contrast Remix)
4. "Something Good '08" (Warren Clarke Remix)
5. "Something Good '08" (Ian Carey Remix)
6. "Something Good '08" (Prok & Fitch Remix)
7. "Something Good '08" (eSquire Remix)
8. "Something Good '08" (Video)
- "Something Good '09" (2009 US digital EP)
1. "Something Good '09" (radio edit) – 2:42
2. "Something Good '09" (Warren Clarke radio edit)
3. "Something Good '09" (Van She Tech Mix)
4. "Something Good '09" (eSquire Remix)
5. "Something Good '09" (Bart B More Remix)

== Charts ==
=== "Something Good" ===
==== Weekly charts ====
Weekly chart performance for "Something Good"
Chart (1992)	Peak position
Australia (ARIA)	10
Europe (Eurochart Hot 100)	19
Finland (Suomen virallinen lista)	13
Ireland (IRMA)	4
New Zealand (Recorded Music NZ)	42
UK Singles (Official Charts)	4
UK Airplay (Music Week)	35
UK Dance (Music Week)	10
UK Club Chart (Music Week)	36
US Billboard Hot 100	98
US Dance Club Play (Billboard)	7
US Maxi-Singles Sales (Billboard)	26
US Modern Rock Tracks (Billboard)	7
US Cash Box Top 100	92

==== Year-end charts ====
Year-end chart performance for "Something Good"
Chart (1992)	Position
Australia (ARIA)	52
UK Singles (OCC)	36

=== "Something Good '08" ===
==== Weekly charts ====
Weekly chart performance for "Something Good '08"
Chart (2008)	Peak position
Australia (ARIA)	32
Ireland (IRMA)	22
Netherlands (Dutch Top 40)	31
Netherlands (Single Top 100)	29
Scottish Singles Sales (Official Charts)	4
UK Singles (Official Charts)	8
UK Dance (Official Charts)	1

==== Year-end charts ====
Year-end chart performance for "Something Good '08"
Chart (2008)	Position
UK Singles (OCC)	60

== Certifications ==
Certifications for "Something Good" and "Something Good '08"
Region	Certification	Certified units/sales
Australia (ARIA)	Gold	35,000^{^}
United Kingdom (BPI) "Something Good '08"	Gold	400,000^{‡}
^{^} Shipments figures based on certification alone.^{‡} Sales+streaming figures based on certification alone.

== Release history ==
Release dates and formats for "Something Good"
Region	Version	Date	Format(s)	Label(s)	Ref.
United Kingdom	"Something Good"	25 May 1992	7-inch vinyl; 12-inch vinyl; CD; cassette	FFRR	
Australia	"Something Good"	17 August 1992	CD; cassette	FFRR	
United Kingdom	"Something Good '08"	10 March 2008	Digital download	Data; Ministry of Sound	
Australia	"Something Good '08"	21 April 2008	CD	Hussle	
