= Two (Utah Saints album) =

Studio album by Utah Saints
- Released: 23 October 2000
- Genre: Electronic; house; big beat; hip hop
- Length: 59:24 (UK edition); 65:09 (US/Canada edition)
- Label: Echo (UK); Nettwerk (US/Canada)
- Producer: Utah Saints

Utah Saints chronology
Utah Saints (1992)	Two (2000)

Singles from Two
- 1. "Love Song" Released: 24 January 2000; 2. "Funky Music" Released: 8 May 2000; 3. "Power to the Beats" Released: 2 October 2000; 4. "Lost Vagueness" Released: 2001

Professional ratings
Review scores
Source	Rating
AllMusic	4/5 stars
Robert Christgau	(dud)
The Encyclopedia of Popular Music	3/5 stars
Request	69/100
Rolling Stone	3/5 stars
Spin	8/10

Two is the second album by British electronic group Utah Saints, released on 23 October 2000 in the UK and 14 August 2001 in the US and Canada. The album features guest vocalists Michael Stipe ("Sun", "Punk Club", "Rhinoceros", "Wiggedy Wack"), Chuck D ("Power to the Beats"), Edwin Starr ("Funky Music") and Guy Leger ("Sick").

"Love Song" peaked at No. 37 on the UK Singles Chart.

== Critical reception ==
Spin praised the album's take on trance, writing that it is "spun with a lithe touch that gives the awe-kissed micromelodies of 'Massive' and 'Lost Vagueness' a sense of rapture uncoiling."

== Track listing ==
=== UK edition ===
1. "Sun"
2. "Power to the Beats"
3. "Love Song"
4. "Lost Vagueness"
5. "Punk Club"
6. "Funky Music Sho' 'Nuff Turns Me On"
7. "Massive"
8. "Rhinoceros"
9. "Morning Sun"
10. "Sick"
11. "B777"
12. "Techknowledgy"
13. "Three Simple Words"
14. "Wiggedy Wack"

=== US edition ===
1. "Sun"
2. "Massive"
3. "Power to the Beats"
4. "Lost Vagueness" (Oliver Lieb Mix)
5. "Punk Club"
6. "Funky Music"
7. "Rhinoceros"
8. "Morning Sun"
9. "Sick"
10. "B777"
11. "Techknowledgy"
12. "Three Simple Words"
13. "Love Song"
14. "Lost Vagueness" (Original Mix)
15. "Wiggedy Wack"

== Samples ==
- The track "Power to the Beats" features a sample of "Enter Sandman" by American heavy metal band Metallica. This was the first time that the band had approved of sampling one of their songs.
- The track "Love Song" features a sample of "Pick Up the Pieces" by British funk band Average White Band.
- The track "Lost Vagueness" features a sample of "I Go to Sleep" by American rock band The Pretenders.
- The track "Techknowledgy" features a sample of "Search and Destroy" by American punk rock band The Stooges.
- The track "Three Simple Words" features a sample of "Come Into My Life" by American R&B singer Joyce Sims.
