= Good to Go Lover =

Album by Gwen Guthrie

Studio album by Gwen Guthrie
- Released: January 21, 1986
- Genre: Dance-pop, R&B
- Label: Polydor (829 532-1 Y-1)
- Producer: Gwen Guthrie, David "Pic" Conley (associate), Jerome Gasper (executive)

Gwen Guthrie chronology
Just for You (1985)	Good to Go Lover (1986)	Ticket to Ride (1987)

Professional ratings
Review scores
Source	Rating
AllMusic	3/5 stars
Robert Christgau	C+

Good to Go Lover is a 1986 studio album by American singer Gwen Guthrie. The album was produced by Guthrie, with musicians performing on the album including Larry Levan, two Surface members and Bernie Worrell, a Parliament-Funkadelic keyboardist.

The album spawned one big hit single, "Ain't Nothin' Goin' On but the Rent", reaching number 1 on both the US Billboard Dance Music/Club Play Singles and Hot Black Singles charts and number 42 on the pop chart. "Ain't Nothin' Goin' on But the Rent" was also a big hit in the UK, where it reached number 5 in the UK Singles Chart. The second single released from the album, a cover of "(They Long To Be) Close To You", reached number 25 in the UK.

== Track listing ==
Side one
No.	Title	Writer(s)	Length
1.	"(They Long to Be) Close to You"	Burt Bacharach, Hal David	5:33
2.	"Outside in the Rain"	David Conley, Bernard Jackson, David Townsend, Joshua Thompson	5:19
3.	"Good to Go Lover"	Gwen Guthrie, Bill Hagans	6:04
4.	"You Touched My Life"	Gwen Guthrie	5:08

Side two
No.	Title	Writer(s)	Length
5.	"Ain't Nothin' Goin' on But the Rent"	Gwen Guthrie	5:55
6.	"I Still Want You"	David Conley, Bernard Jackson, David Townsend	4:42
7.	"Stop Holding Back"	David Conley, Bernard Jackson, David Townsend	6:01
8.	"Passion Eyes"	Charles W. Rogers	5:05

2013 remastered reissue bonus tracks
No.	Title	Writer(s)	Length
9.	"Ain't Nothin' Goin' on But the Rent" (12" Club Mix)	Gwen Guthrie	7:16
10.	"Outside in the Rain" (US Polydor 7" Version)	David Conley, Bernard Jackson, David Townsend, Joshua Thompson	4:02
11.	"Save Your Love for Me" (Duet with Surface)	Gwen Guthrie, David Conley, Bernard Jackson, David Townsend	4:50
12.	"(They Long to Be) Close to You" (US Polydor 7" Version)	Burt Bacharach, Hal David	3:49

== Personnel ==
=== Musicians ===
- Michael Clark – keyboards
- David Conley – drum programming, keyboards, Moog Bass, synthesizer
- Sly Dunbar – drum programming
- Steve Ferrone – drums
- Gwen Guthrie – vocal arrangement, background vocals, vocals
- Bill Hagans – drum programming, keyboards
- Gary Henry – keyboards
- Brian Morgan – performer
- Onaje Allan Gumbs – performer
- Ira Siegel – guitar
- David Townsend – keyboards
- Bernie Worrell – keyboards

=== Production ===
- Dave Conley, Gregg Mann, Harvey Goldberg, Larry Levan, Matthew "Krash" Kasha – mixing
- Gregg Mann – engineer
- Steve Khan – engineer
- Scott James – engineer
- Julian Robertson – engineer
- Tom Zepp – engineer
- Kendal Stubbs – engineer
- Bill Wylie – photography
- Jack Skinner – mastering
- Dave Conley – associate producer
- Ernestine Bell – production assistant
- Jerome Gasper – mixing, executive producer
- Gwen Guthrie – producer, mixing

== Chart performance ==
Charts (1986)	Peak position
U.S. Billboard R&B	20
U.S. Billboard 200	89
Australia (Kent Music Report)	99
UK Albums Chart	42

=== Singles ===
Year	Title	Chart positions					
Year	Title	U.S. Hot 100	U.S. R&B	U.S. Club Play	U.S. Dance Sales	AUS	UK
1986	"Ain't Nothin' Goin' on But the Rent"	42	1	1	3	75	5
1986	"Outside the Rain"	—	51	—	—	—	—
1987	"(They Long to Be) Close to You"	—	69	—	—	—	26
