= Angela Bofill =

American R&B singer (1954–2024)

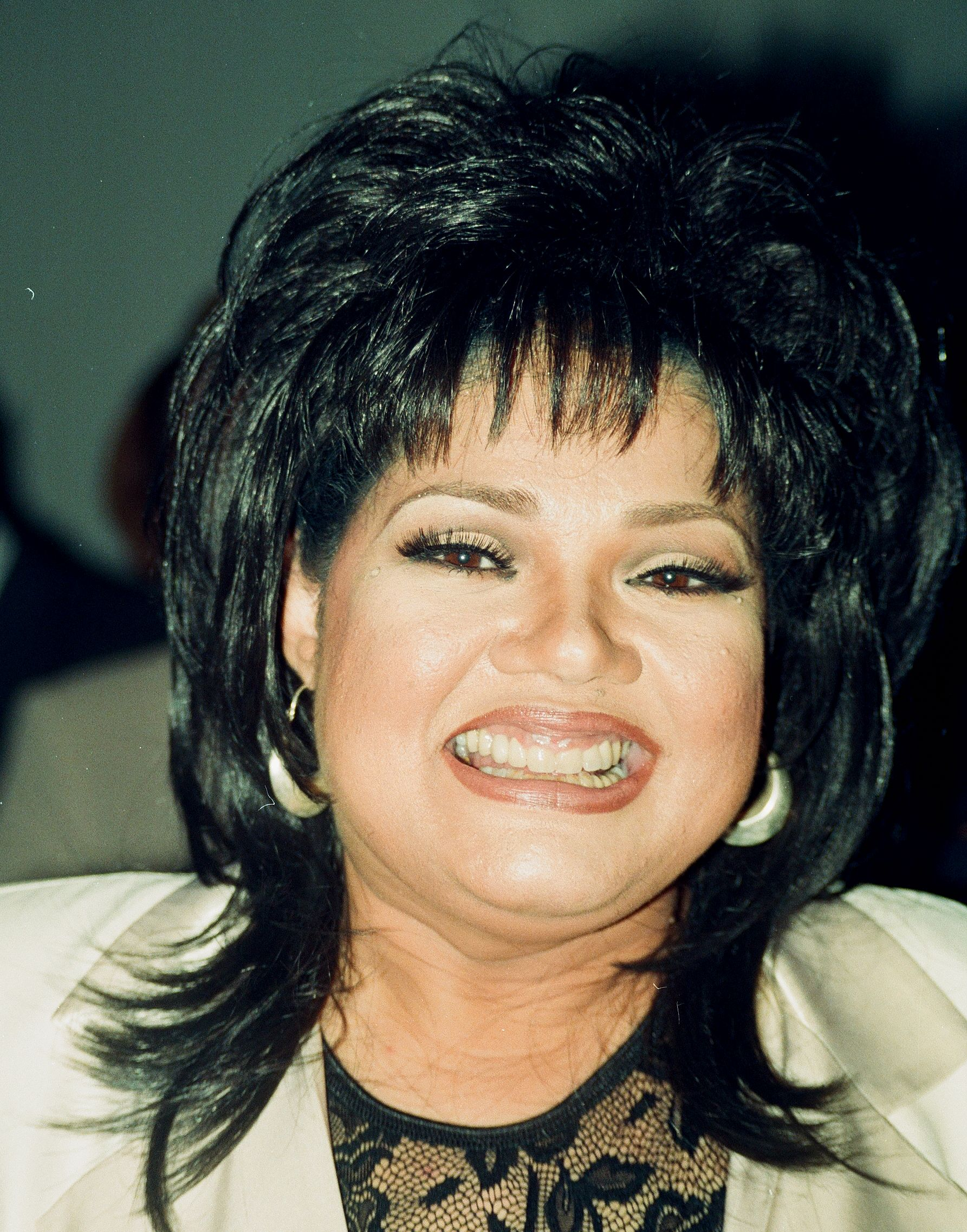
- Bofill in 1996

Background information
- Born: Angela Tomasa Bofill; May 2, 1954; New York City, U.S.
- Origin: The Bronx, New York City
- Died: June 13, 2024 (aged 70) Vallejo, California, U.S.
- Genres: R&B; soul; pop
- Occupations: Singer; songwriter; composer
- Instrument: Vocals
- Years active: 1973–2006
- Labels: GRP; Arista; Capitol; Jive; Shanachie
- Website: angelabofill.com

Angela Tomasa Bofill (May 2, 1954 – June 13, 2024) was an American singer, songwriter and composer. A New York native, she began her professional career in the mid-1970s and is most known for singles such as "This Time I'll Be Sweeter", "Angel of the Night", and "I Try". Her career spanned over four decades.

== Early life and education ==
Angela Tomasa Bofill was born on May 2, 1954, in Brooklyn area of New York City to a Cuban father and a Puerto Rican mother. Raised in The Bronx, Bofill grew up listening to Latin music and was also inspired by American performers. During Bofill's childhood, her weekends were taken up studying classical music and singing in New York City's All City Chorus, which featured the best singers from all of the high schools in the five boroughs. She attended Hunter College High School, graduating in 1972. Bofill later studied at the Manhattan School of Music, receiving a Bachelor of Music degree in 1976.

== Career ==
Bofill began her professional career, singing during her teenage years. Bofill performed with Ricardo Marrero & the Group and Dance Theater of Harlem chorus before being introduced to Dave Grusin and Larry Rosen of the jazz label GRP Records by Dave Valentin, her friend and jazz flautist. Grusin and Rosen signed Bofill and produced her first album, Angie, in 1978. Angie was well received both critically and commercially and included the chart single "This Time I'll Be Sweeter" (co-written by Gwen Guthrie and Haras Fyre), and Bofill's sprawling jazz composition, "Under the Moon and Over the Sky". Less than a year later, a second album, Angel of the Night was released and outperformed its predecessor. The album included the chart singles "What I Wouldn't Do (For the Love of You)" and the up-tempo title track, as well as the song "I Try", written by Bofill and covered by Will Downing in 1991. The reception of these albums positioned Bofill as one of the first Latina singers to find success in the R&B and jazz markets.

Bofill performed a sold-out concert at Avery Fisher Hall as part of the Newport Jazz Festival on June 20, 1980. Her musical director was Onaje Allen Gumbs, keyboards, Sammy Figueroa, percussion, a 9-piece band and guests including Steve Khan, guitar, Eddie Daniels, tenor sax and flute, and a 24-voice choir.

Clive Davis, the head of Arista Records, showed interest in Bofill. Arista had a distribution deal with GRP. Bofill switched labels for her next album, Something About You (1981). Produced by Narada Michael Walden, the album was an attempt to move Bofill into mainstream R&B and pop music. It didn't perform as well as previous releases, despite the singles "Holdin' Out for Love" and the title track, which both reached the R&B Top 40. The following year, Bofill and Walden reunited for Too Tough. The title song reached No. 5 on the R&B chart and spent four weeks at No. 2 on the Dance chart. A follow-up single, "Tonight I Give In", reached the Top 20. Several months later, Bofill released her final collaboration with Walden, Teaser. The album failed to match the success of Too Tough but did produce one Top 20 R&B hit, "I'm On Your Side", which has been covered by several artists, most notably Jennifer Holliday, who had a Top 10 hit with it in 1991.

Bofill recorded two more albums for Arista with the help of The System and George Duke before leaving the label in the mid-1980s. Following the birth of her daughter, she moved to Capitol Records and the producer Norman Connors for Intuition (1988), which produced her last significant chart success, a cover of Gino Vannelli's "I Just Wanna Stop", which reached No. 11 on the R&B chart. She recorded three more albums over the next eight years and provided backing vocals on albums for Diana Ross and Kirk Whalum and for Connors's Eternity (2000). She performed live (with a sizable audience internationally, particularly in Asia) and appeared in the stage plays God Don't Like Ugly and What a Man Wants, What a Man Needs. She also toured the U.S. and Europe in multi-artist jazz shows.

Bofill returned to the stage, at the suggestion of Engel, for "The Angela Bofill Experience" after losing her ability to sing after her second stroke in 2007. In the show, Bofill recounted her life and career and was joined by Maysa Leak, Phil Perry, and Melba Moore, who performed her biggest hits and signature songs. In 2012, Bofill was profiled and interviewed for the TVOne documentary series, Unsung.

In 2023, Bofill was inducted into the Women Songwriters Hall of Fame.

== Personal life ==
Bofill was married to farmer Richard Vincent from 1984 until 1994 and together they have a daughter named Shauna, born in November 1984.

== Health problems and death ==
Bofill suffered a stroke on January 10, 2006, and was paralyzed on her left side. She convalesced at Sutter Hospital in Santa Rosa, California, and was released from intensive care on January 15, requiring speech and physical therapy. Bofill lacked health insurance, and a benefit concert was organized to pay her hospital bills.

The show was planned by Rich Engel, her manager, and the New York radio stations Kiss FM and WFAN-FM. It took place on March 11, 2006, at the Bergen Performing Arts Center in Englewood, New Jersey. Similar events followed, and other aid was sought from the Rhythm and Blues Foundation. Her album Live from Manila (recorded in September 2004) was released during this time. Bofill suffered a second stroke in July 2007, which required therapy and left both her speech and mobility impaired.

She died on June 13, 2024, at the age of 70 at her daughter's home in Vallejo, California. Bofill's funeral mass was held on June 28, 2024 at St. Dominic's Catholic Church in Benicia, California.

== Discography ==
=== Studio albums ===
Year	Album	Chart positions				Record label
Year	Album	US	US R&B	US Jazz	Canada	Record label
1978	Angie	47	20	5	69	GRP/Arista
1979	Angel of the Night	34	10	2	—	GRP/Arista
1981	Something About You	61	13	4	—	Arista
1983	Too Tough	40	6	—	—	Arista
1983	Teaser	81	20	21	—	Arista
1984	Let Me Be the One	—	39	—	—	Arista
1985	Tell Me Tomorrow	—	53	—	—	Arista
1988	Intuition	—	38	—	—	Capitol
1993	I Wanna Love Somebody	—	51	—	—	Jive
1996	Love in Slow Motion	—	—	—	—	Shanachie
"—" denotes the album failed to chart

=== Live albums ===
Year	Album	Chart positions		Record label
Year	Album	US	US R&B	Record label
2006	Live from Manila	—	—	Black Angel
"—" denotes the album failed to chart

=== Compilation albums ===
Year	Album	Chart positions		Record label
Year	Album	US	US R&B	Record label
1986	The Best of Angela Bofill	—	—	Arista
1991	The Best of Angie: Next Time I'll Be Sweeter	—	—	Arista
1999	The Definitive Collection	—	—	Arista
2003	Platinum & Gold Collection	—	—	Arista
2004	The Best of Angela Bofill	—	—	BMG
2014	The Essential Angela Bofill	—	—	RCA, Sony Legacy
"—" denotes the album failed to chart

=== Singles ===
Year	Single	Chart positions					Album
Year	Single	US	US R&B	US A/C	US Dance	NL	Album
1979	"This Time I'll Be Sweeter"	104	23	39	—	—	Angie
1979	"What I Wouldn't Do (For the Love of You)"	—	18	—	—	—	Angel of the Night
1980	"Angel of the Night"	—	67	—	—	—	Angel of the Night
1981	"Something About You"	—	21	—	—	—	Something About You
1982	"Holdin' Out for Love"	—	26	—	—	32	Something About You
1982	"Break It to Me Gently"	—	—	—	—	—	Something About You
1983	"Too Tough"	—	5	—	2	—	Too Tough
1983	"Tonight I Give In"	—	12	—	—	—	Too Tough
1983	"I'm on Your Side"	—	20	—	—	—	Teaser
1984	"Special Delivery"	—	65	—	34	—	Teaser
1984	"Can't Slow Down"	—	59	—	15	—	Let Me Be the One
1985	"Let Me Be the One"	—	84	—	—	—	Let Me Be the One
1985	"Who Knows You Better"	—	—	—	—	—	Let Me Be the One
1985	"Tell Me Tomorrow"	—	72	—	—	—	Tell Me Tomorrow
1986	"I Don't Wanna Come Down (From Love)"	—	—	—	—	—	Tell Me Tomorrow
1986	"Still in Love"	—	—	—	—	—	Tell Me Tomorrow
1988	"I Just Wanna Stop"	—	11	—	—	—	Intuition
1989	"Love Is in Your Eyes"	—	—	—	—	—	Intuition
1992	"Love Was Never" (with Marion Meadows & Gene Rice)	—	70	—	—	—	Keep It Right There
1993	"I Wanna Love Somebody"	—	—	—	—	—	I Wanna Love Somebody
1993	"Heavenly Love"	—	—	—	—	—	I Wanna Love Somebody
"—" denotes the single failed to chart

== Awards ==
- American Music Awards: 1984 – Best R&B/Soul Female Artist (nominated)
- Bay Area Music Awards (Bammies): 1984 Outstanding Black Contemporary Artist/Group

== Other media appearances ==
- Friends in Love, 1983 Philippine film where she sang "This Time I'll Be Sweeter" with Sharon Cuneta. They had a reunion duet and sang the same hit song in 2000, while Bofill was promoting another Manila concert.
- Soul Train, Saturday May 28, 1983
- The Pat Sajak Show, January 26, 1989
