= Do It in the Name of Love (Ben E. King song) =

Single by Ben E. King

from the album Supernatural
- B-side: "Imagination"
- Released: May 1975
- Genre: Soul
- Length: 4:23
- Label: Atlantic Records; 45-3274
- Songwriter(s): Patrick Grant, Gwen Guthrie
- Producer(s): Bert De Coteaux, Tony Silvester

Ben E. King singles chronology
"Supernatural Thing" (January 1975)	"Do It in the Name of Love" (1975)	"I Had a Love" (December 1975)

"Do It in the Name of Love" is a song written by Patrick Grant and Gwen Guthrie and performed by Ben E. King. In 1975, the track reached #4 on the U.S. R&B chart and #60 on the Billboard chart.

It was featured on his 1975 album, Supernatural.
