= This Time I'll Be Sweeter =

Soul ballad by Haras Fyre and Gwen Guthrie

"This Time I'll Be Sweeter" is a soul ballad written by Haras Fyre (professionally known as Pat Grant) and Gwen Guthrie.

The first release of "This Time I'll Be Sweeter" was as the B-side of the May 1975 Arista Records single release "Love Blind" by Martha Reeves; both sides of Reeves' single were produced by Bert De Coteaux and Tony Silvester who had hired composers Gwen Guthrie and Haras Fyre (a.k.a. Patrick/Pat Grant) as staff writers for the De Coteaux/Silvester company Penumbra Music in 1973. The Martha Reeves version of "This Time I'll Be Sweeter" was included on Reeves' 1976 album release The Rest of My Life.

== Early versions ==
- De Couteaux and Silvester also produced the version by Linda Lewis on her album Not a Little Girl Anymore released - also on Arista - in June 1975. Lewis' version - whose chorale consisted of the song's co-writer Gwen Guthrie with Deniece Williams - was released as the album's lead single in the US. It was later issued in the UK in September 1976 as the follow-up to the hit song "Baby I'm Yours", just missing the UK Top 50, peaking at #51. The track did afford Lewis a hit in Brazil ranking at #65 on that nation's ranking of the Top 100 singles for the year 1976.
- "This Time I'll Be Sweeter" was also featured on the 1976 album release by Marlena Shaw, Just a Matter of Time, a Bert DeCoteaux/Tony Silvester production. Shaw's version of "This Time I'll Be Sweeter" has been cited by the song's co-writer Pat Grant/Haras Fyre (also the bassist on several of the song's earliest versions) as being the original version of the song, as Fyre asserts that Shaw's recording of "This Time I'll Be Sweeter" dates from 1974.
- Roberta Flack recorded "This Time I'll Be Sweeter" in the 1973-1974 sessions for her 1975 album release Feel Like Makin' Love with Gwen Guthrie contributing background vocals to the track, which would be held over for release on Flack's 1977 album Blue Lights in the Basement.

== Angela Bofill version ==
"This Time I'll Be Sweeter"

Single by Angela Bofill

from the album Angie
- B-side: "Baby, I Need Your Love"
- Released: 21 November 1978
- Recorded: 1978
- Genre: R&B; soul
- Length: 4:21
- Label: GRP Records
- Songwriters: Gwen Guthrie; Haras Fyre
- Producers: Dave Grusin; Larry Rosen

Angela Bofill singles chronology
"This Time I'll Be Sweeter" (1978)	"Baby, I Need Your Love" (1979)

"This Time I'll Be Sweeter" had its highest profile incarnation as the debut single for Angela Bofill who recorded "This Time I'll Be Sweeter" for her debut studio album, Angie (1978). Bofill's producer, Dave Grusin, knew of the song due to his being acquainted with its composer, Gwen Guthrie, who he had frequently utilized as a session singer (Guthrie was a member of the chorale featured on the Angie album, although the chorale is not featured on "This Time I'll Be Sweeter"). Co-released with the Angie album on 21 November 1978, Bofill's "This Time I'll Be Sweeter" single reached No. 23 on the Hot Soul Singles chart and No. 104 on the Billboard Hot 100's, bubbling under chart. A duet version with Sharon Cuneta was released and performed in the 1983 film Friends in Love. A live version of "This Time I'll Be Sweeter" is featured on Bofill's 2006 Live from Manila concert album.
