= Hounds of Love =

1985 studio album by Kate Bush

Studio album by Kate Bush
- Released: 16 September 1985
- Recorded: November 1983 – June 1985
- Studios: Wickham Farm Home Studio (Welling, England); Windmill Lane (Dublin); Abbey Road (London) (Note: Orchestral sections)
- Genres: Art pop; progressive pop; new wave; art rock; progressive rock; sophisti-pop
- Length: 47:33
- Label: EMI
- Producer: Kate Bush

Kate Bush chronology
| Kate Bush (1984) | Hounds of Love (1985) | The Whole Story (1986) |

Singles from Hounds of Love
- 1. "Running Up That Hill" Released: 5 August 1985; 2. "Cloudbusting" Released: 14 October 1985; 3. "Hounds of Love" Released: 17 February 1986; 4. "The Big Sky" Released: 21 April 1986

Hounds of Love is the fifth studio album by the English musician Kate Bush, released on 16 September 1985 by EMI Records. It was a commercial and artistic success and marked a return to the public eye for Bush after the relatively low sales of her previous album, 1982's The Dreaming. The album's lead single, "Running Up That Hill", became Bush's biggest hit, initially peaking at no. 3 upon its original 1985 release but later giving Bush her second UK number-one single in June 2022. The album's first side produced three further singles, "Cloudbusting", "Hounds of Love", and "The Big Sky", all of which reached the UK Top 40. The second side, subtitled The Ninth Wave, forms a conceptual suite about a woman drifting alone in the sea at night.

Considered to be Bush's magnum opus, Hounds of Love received critical acclaim and often ranks among the greatest albums of all time. It was Bush's second album to top the UK Albums Chart and her first to reach the top 40 on the US Billboard 200. Hounds of Love is Bush's best-selling studio album, having been certified double platinum for 600,000 sales in the UK, and by 1998 it had sold 1.1 million copies worldwide. The album was nominated at the 1986 Brit Awards for Best British Album, at which Bush was also nominated for Best British Female and Best British Single for "Running Up That Hill".

In 2022, the album re-entered various charts, including reaching number one on the Billboard Top Alternative Albums, due to the appearance of "Running Up That Hill" in the fourth season of the Netflix series Stranger Things.

== Background and recording ==
In the summer of 1983, Bush began laying the groundwork for Hounds of Love at her home recording onto 8-track equipment, using a LinnDrum, Fairlight and piano. Wanting to retain the feel and atmosphere of these early recordings, she had them transferred to 24-track to build the final versions around once recording sessions officially began in November 1983. Following these sessions, as well as several recording sessions in Ireland during the spring of 1984, Bush began overdubbing and mixing the album in a process that took a year and the album was finished in June 1985. The recording sessions included use of the Fairlight CMI synthesiser, piano, traditional Irish instruments, and layered vocals. "Waking the Witch" quotes from the chorus of the sea shanty "Blood Red Roses." The chorale in "Hello Earth" is a segment from the traditional Georgian song "Tsintskaro", performed by the Richard Hickox Singers. The lines "It's in the trees! It's coming!" from the beginning of the title track are sampled from a seance scene from the 1957 British horror film Night of the Demon, spoken by actor Maurice Denham.

The album was produced as two suites, with side one being subtitled Hounds of Love and side two a seven-track concept piece subtitled The Ninth Wave. The album has been described as post-progressive because Bush voices themes of love and womanly passion rather than the usual male viewpoints associated with progressive rock.

The Ninth Wave uses a great many textures to express the story: in the style of Alfred, Lord Tennyson's Arthurian poems, Bush pursues a vision quest, taking the listener through a death and rebirth. The warmth of familiar sleep is cut by dangerous speed, ice and frigid water, an otherworldly trial and judgment, an out-of-body experience in limbo, and finally a vigorous emergence and grounding in life energy. The disparate musical elements of The Ninth Wave were described by Ron Moy as "classically prog" because of their evident experimentation, and because Bush wholly embraces European music traditions without a trace of American influence.

== Release and promotion ==
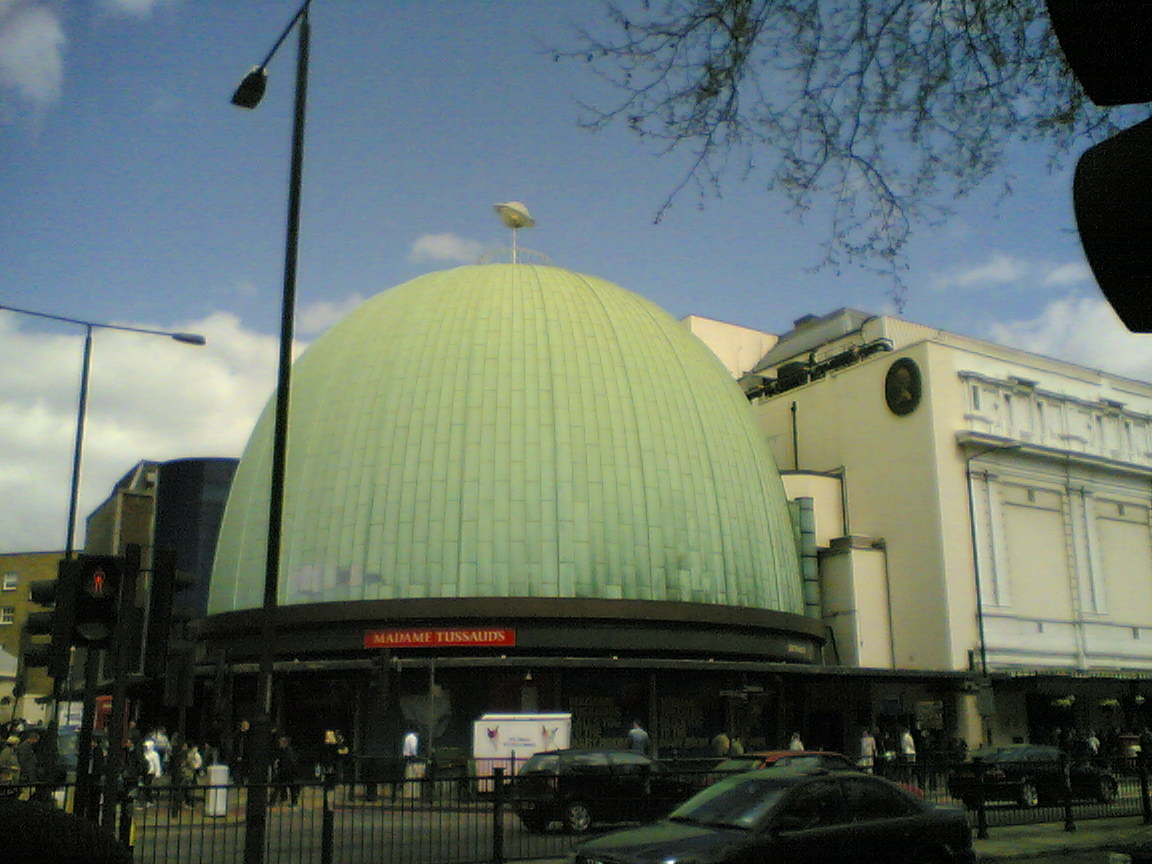
The album's launch party was held at the London Planetarium (pictured in 2006).

On 5 August 1985, Bush performed the new single "Running Up That Hill (A Deal with God)" on Terry Wogan's BBC1 television chat show Wogan. The single entered the UK singles chart at number nine and ultimately peaked at number three, becoming Bush's second-highest-charting single after her chart-topping debut single "Wuthering Heights". The song is Bush's only US top 40 hit, reaching number 30 on the Billboard Hot 100 during its original chart run in 1985.

The album launch party was held at the London Planetarium on 5 September 1985. The invited guests were treated to a playback of the entire album while watching a laser show inside the Planetarium. Hounds of Love was released on 16 September 1985 by EMI Records on vinyl, XDR cassette and compact disc formats. It entered the UK Albums Chart at number one, knocking Madonna's Like a Virgin (1984) from the top position. The album also yielded a set of music videos, one of which was "Cloudbusting", directed by Julian Doyle and co-starring Donald Sutherland. The video, like the song, was inspired by the life of psychologist Wilhelm Reich.

As a companion to the album, a 20-minute videotape and LaserDisc, The Hair of the Hound, was released in 1986, containing music videos for the four singles.

On 16 June 1997, a remastered version of the album was issued on CD as part of EMI's "First Centenary" reissue series. The "EMI First Centenary" edition included six bonus tracks: 12" mixes of "The Big Sky" and "Running Up That Hill (A Deal with God)", and the B-sides "Under the Ivy", "Burning Bridge", "My Lagan Love", and "Be Kind to My Mistakes", the last of which was written for Nicolas Roeg's 1986 film Castaway and plays during the opening scene.

In 2010, Audio Fidelity reissued Hounds of Love on vinyl with new remastering by Steve Hoffman.

A 10" pink vinyl record with four songs taken from the album ("The Big Sky", "Cloudbusting", "Watching You Without Me" and "Jig of Life") was released by Audio Fidelity (catalogue number AFZEP 001) on 16 April 2011 for Record Store Day 2011, limited to 1000 copies worldwide.

During her 2014 Before the Dawn concerts, Bush performed almost the entire album live for the first time, with the exceptions of "The Big Sky" and "Mother Stands for Comfort". "Running Up That Hill (A Deal with God)" had previously been performed live in 1987 with David Gilmour of Pink Floyd at The Secret Policeman's Third Ball.

In November 2018, Bush released box sets of remasters of her studio albums, including Hounds of Love.

== Reception ==
Professional ratings
Review scores
| Source | Rating |
|---|---|
| AllMusic | 5/5 stars |
| Los Angeles Times | 4/4 stars |
| Mojo | 5/5 stars |
| Pitchfork | 10/10 |
| Q | 5/5 stars |
| Record Mirror | 5/5 |
| The Rolling Stone Album Guide | 4/5 stars |
| Sounds | 5/5 stars |
| Spin Alternative Record Guide | 8/10 |
| The Village Voice | B |

Hounds of Love contemporarily received positive reviews in the UK. Sounds journalist Ronnie Randall hailed the album as "dramatic, moving and wildly, unashamedly, beautifully romantic", while Record Mirror's Robin Smith deemed it "a howling success" that "recaptures the ground Kate lost with her last album". In the NME, Jane Solanas called Hounds of Love "an obvious progression of the skill shown on The Dreaming" and scorned the idea that by signing to EMI as a teenager, Bush had allowed herself to be moulded in their corporate image, suggesting that on the contrary, it had enabled her to use the system for her own purposes: "Our Kate's a genius, the rarest solo artist this country's ever produced. She makes sceptics dance to her tune." It ranked at number 10 on the magazine's list of the best albums of 1985. A more reserved review came from Melody Maker's Colin Irwin, who found that Bush had "learned you can have control without sacrificing passion" despite "some overly fussy arrangements that get the better of her", although the Ninth Wave suite "is too confused and the execution too laborious and stilted to carry real weight as a complete entity."

In the US, reaction to the record at the time was mixed. "With traces of classical, operatic, tribal, and twisted pop styles," raved Steve Matteo in Spin, "Kate creates music that observes no boundaries of musical structure or inner expression ... While her eclecticism is welcomed and rewarded in her homeland her genius is still ignored here – a situation that is truly a shame for an artist so adventurous and naturally theatrical." In The New York Times, John Rockwell characterised the album's music as "slightly precious, calculated female art rock" and said that Bush had become "a real master of instrumental textures". Rolling Stone, in their first review of a Kate Bush record, was unimpressed: critic Rob Tannenbaum wrote that Hounds of Love "both dazzles and bores" and felt that while Bush's "orchestrations swell to the limits of technology", she "often overdecorates her songs with exotica ... There's no arguing that Bush is extraordinarily talented, but as with Jonathan Richman, rock's other eternal kid, her vision will seem silly to those who believe children should be seen and not heard."

In a 2014 retrospective piece for The Independent, Nick Coleman described Hounds of Love as Bush's "acknowledged masterpiece ... a prog-pop masque of an album built with the cold instrumentation of a neophiliac age". Spin called it an "art-pop classic", and Barry Walters of Pitchfork noted that the album draws from synth-pop and progressive rock whilst remaining wholly distinct from either style. In a 2025 40th anniversary reappraisal, Charles Switzer of PopMatters observed: "Forty years later, Hounds of Love's true power lies in this invitation: to use its sound to neurologically film what our dream worlds sound like."

== Legacy ==
=== Accolades ===
In 1998, Q magazine readers voted Hounds of Love the 48th-greatest album of all time, while two years later the same magazine placed it at number 20 in its list of the "100 Greatest British Albums Ever", and the third "Greatest Album of All Time by a Female Artist" in 2002. In 2006, Q placed the album at number four in its list of "40 Best Albums of the '80s". In January 2006, NME named it the 41st-best British album of all time. The 19th edition of British Hit Singles & Albums, published by Guinness in May 2006, included a list of the Top 100 albums of all time, as voted by readers of the book and NME readers, which placed Hounds of Love at number 70. In 2008, The Atlanta Journal-Constitution said the album should be given consideration when listing albums released between 1978 and 1988 that have stood the test of time while remaining influential and enjoyable to this day.

In 2012, Slant Magazine listed the album at number 10 on its list of "Best Albums of the 1980s". In 2013, NME placed Hounds of Love 48th on its "500 Greatest Albums of All Time" list. In a 2018 poll of the public conducted by NPR, Hounds of Love was voted in fourth place in its list of 150 greatest albums ever made by female artists. Also in 2018, Pitchfork included the album at number four on their list of "The 200 Best Albums of the 1980s". In 2020, Rolling Stone ranked Hounds of Love at number 68 on its list of the "500 Greatest Albums of All Time". In 2024, Apple Music placed the album at number 50 on its "Apple Music 100 Best Albums" list.

=== Influence ===
Hounds of Love was described as "one of the big inspirations" for Alison Goldfrapp of Goldfrapp. Suede lead singer Brett Anderson said of Hounds of Love: "I love the way it's a record of two halves, and the second half is a concept record about fear of drowning. It's an amazing record to listen to really late at night, unsettling and really jarring". Stevie Nicks of Fleetwood Mac named Hounds of Love as one of her favourite albums. Kele Okereke of Bloc Party said of the title track: "The first time I heard it I was sitting in a reclining sofa. As the beat started I was transported somewhere else. Her voice, the imagery, the huge drum sound: it seemed to capture everything for me. As a songwriter you're constantly chasing that feeling".

== Track listing ==
All tracks are written by Kate Bush, except where noted.

Side one: Hounds of Love
| No. | Title | Length |
|---|---|---|
| 1. | "Running Up That Hill (A Deal with God)" | 5:00 |
| 2. | "Hounds of Love" | 3:02 |
| 3. | "The Big Sky" | 4:41 |
| 4. | "Mother Stands for Comfort" | 3:07 |
| 5. | "Cloudbusting" | 5:10 |
| Total length: | | 21:03 |

Side two: The Ninth Wave
| No. | Title | Writer(s) | Length |
|---|---|---|---|
| 6. | "And Dream of Sheep" | | 2:45 |
| 7. | "Under Ice" | | 2:21 |
| 8. | "Waking the Witch" | | 4:18 |
| 9. | "Watching You Without Me" | | 4:06 |
| 10. | "Jig of Life" | | 4:04 |
| 11. | "Hello Earth" | K. Bush; Traditional | 6:13 |
| 12. | "The Morning Fog" | | 2:34 |
| Total length: | | | 26:21 |

1997 remaster bonus tracks
| No. | Title | Writer(s) | Length |
|---|---|---|---|
| 13. | "The Big Sky" (Meteorological Mix) | | 7:44 |
| 14. | "Running Up That Hill" (12" Mix) | | 5:45 |
| 15. | "Be Kind to My Mistakes" | | 3:00 |
| 16. | "Under the Ivy" | | 2:08 |
| 17. | "Burning Bridge" | | 4:38 |
| 18. | "My Lagan Love" | Traditional; John Carder Bush | 2:30 |

Notes:

- "Hounds of Love" contains a sample of Maurice Denham's voice from Jacques Tourneur's horror film Night of the Demon (1957).
- "Hello Earth" contains an interpolation of the Georgian folk song "Tsintskaro" ("წინწყარო"), as performed by the Richard Hickox Singers.
- The original 1985 cassette release included the 12″ single version of "Running Up That Hill (A Deal with God)" at the end of side one.
- The 2011 Fish People re-release and the 2018 remastered album substitute the "Special Single Mix" version of "The Big Sky", rather than the original album version.

== Personnel ==
Credits are adapted from the Hounds of Love liner notes.

- Kate Bush – vocals, Fairlight synthesizer, Yamaha CS-80, acoustic piano, keyboards
- Kevin McAlea – synthesizer sequencing (8), synthesizers (12)
- Alan Murphy – guitars (1, 3, 8)
- John Williams – guitars (12)
- Dónal Lunny – bouzouki (6, 10, 11), bodhrán (10)
- Del Palmer – LinnDrum programming, bass guitar (1, 10, 12), handclaps (3), backing vocals (5), Fairlight bass (8)
- Martin Glover – bass guitar (3)
- Eberhard Weber – double bass (4, 11)
- Danny Thompson – double bass (9)
- Stuart Elliott – drums (1, 2, 4, 5, 9–11)
- Charlie Morgan – drums (2, 3, 5, 8, 10), handclaps (3)
- Morris Pert – percussion (3)
- Paddy Bush (Note: Kate's brother) – balalaika (1), didgeridoo (3), backing vocals (5), harmony vocals (7), fujara (12), violins (12)
- Jonathan Williams – cello (2)
- John Sheahan – whistles (6, 10), fiddles (10)
- Liam O'Flynn – Uilleann pipes (10, 11)
- Michael Kamen – orchestral arrangements
- Bill Whelan – Irish arrangements
- The Medici Sextet – strings (5)
- Dave Lawson – string arrangements (5)
- Brian Bath – backing vocals (5), guitars (11)
- John Carder Bush – backing vocals (5), narration (10)
- The Richard Hickox Singers – choir (11)
- Richard Hickox – choir master (11)
- Michael Berkeley – vocal arrangements (11)

=== Production ===
- Kate Bush – producer
- Brian Tench – engineer, mixing (1, 3, 5–12)
- Del Palmer – engineer
- Haydn Bendall – engineer
- Paul Hardiman – engineer
- Nigel Walker – engineer
- James Guthrie – engineer
- Bill Somerville-Large – engineer at Windmill Lane Studios
- Pearce Dunne – assistant engineer
- Julian Mendelsohn – mixing (2, 4)
- Ian Cooper – cutting engineer
- Chris Blair – digital remastering
- Photography for the sleeve was by Kate's brother, John Carder Bush, and the sleeve design was by Bill Smith Studio and Kate Bush.

== Charts ==
=== Weekly charts ===
1985 weekly chart performance for Hounds of Love
| Chart (1985) | Peak position |
|---|---|
| Australian Albums (Kent Music Report) | 6 |
| Austrian Albums (Ö3 Austria) | 14 |
| Canada Top Albums/CDs (RPM) | 7 |
| Dutch Albums (Album Top 100) | 1 |
| European Albums (Eurotipsheet) | 7 |
| Finnish Albums (Suomen virallinen lista) | 4 |
| French Albums (IFOP) | 9 |
| German Albums (Offizielle Top 100) | 2 |
| Japanese Albums (Oricon) | 36 |
| New Zealand Albums (RMNZ) | 17 |
| Norwegian Albums (VG-lista) | 12 |
| Swedish Albums (Sverigetopplistan) | 9 |
| Swiss Albums (Schweizer Hitparade) | 3 |
| UK Albums (Official Charts) | 1 |
| US Billboard 200 | 30 |

2014 weekly chart performance for Hounds of Love
| Chart (2014) | Peak position |
|---|---|
| Dutch Albums (Album Top 100) | 95 |
| UK Albums (Official Charts) | 9 |

2022 weekly chart performance for Hounds of Love
| Chart (2022–2023) | Peak position |
|---|---|
| Belgian Albums (Ultratop Flanders) | 97 |
| Belgian Albums (Ultratop Wallonia) | 181 |
| Canadian Albums (Billboard) | 8 |
| Danish Albums (Hitlisten) | 9 |
| Dutch Albums (Album Top 100) | 20 |
| Hungarian Albums (MAHASZ) | 30 |
| Icelandic Albums (Tónlistinn) | 30 |
| Irish Albums (IRMA) | 75 |
| Lithuanian Albums (AGATA) | 74 |
| Portuguese Albums (AFP) | 40 |
| Scottish Albums (Official Charts) | 55 |
| Swiss Albums (Schweizer Hitparade) | 60 |
| UK Albums (Official Charts) | 80 |
| US Billboard 200 | 12 |
| US Top Alternative Albums (Billboard) | 1 |
| US Top Catalog Albums (Billboard) | 1 |
| US Top Rock Albums (Billboard) | 2 |

=== Year-end charts ===
1985 year-end chart performance for Hounds of Love
| Chart (1985) | Position |
|---|---|
| Australian Albums (Kent Music Report) | 79 |
| Canada Top Albums/CDs (RPM) | 32 |
| Dutch Albums (Album Top 100) | 12 |
| French Albums (SNEP) | 40 |
| German Albums (Offizielle Top 100) | 49 |
| UK Albums (Gallup) | 14 |

1986 year-end chart performance for Hounds of Love
| Chart (1986) | Position |
|---|---|
| Canada Top Albums/CDs (RPM) | 85 |
| Dutch Albums (Album Top 100) | 89 |
| European Albums (Music & Media) | 36 |
| German Albums (Offizielle Top 100) | 39 |
| UK Albums (Gallup) | 47 |

2022 year-end chart performance for Hounds of Love
| Chart (2022) | Position |
|---|---|
| Dutch Albums (Album Top 100) | 81 |
| US Billboard 200 | 187 |
| US Top Rock Albums (Billboard) | 33 |

== Certifications and sales ==
Certifications and sales for Hounds of Love
| Region | Certification | Certified units/sales |
|---|---|---|
| Canada (Music Canada) | Platinum | 100,000^{^} |
| Denmark (IFPI Danmark) | Gold | 10,000^{‡} |
| France (SNEP) | Gold | 100,000^{*} |
| Germany (BVMI) | Platinum | 500,000^{^} |
| Japan | — | 24,800 |
| Netherlands (NVPI) | Gold | 50,000^{^} |
| United Kingdom (BPI) | 2× Platinum | 1,000,000 |
| United States | — | 206,000 |
^{*} Sales figures based on certification alone.^{^} Shipments figures based on certification alone.^{‡} Sales+streaming figures based on certification alone.

== See also ==
<! -- Does not appear to have ever been cited as an inspiration by Bush *The Ninth Wave – 1850 painting by Ivan Aïvazovsky; inspiration for The Ninth Wave suite -->

- List of 1980s albums considered the best
