= I Wanna Love Somebody =

Studio album by Angela Bofill
- Released: 1993
- Genre: R&B; jazz; soul
- Length: 49:12
- Label: Jive
- Producer: Eve Nelson; Preston Glass

Angela Bofill chronology
Intuition (1988)	I Wanna Love Somebody (1993)	Love in Slow Motion (1996)

I Wanna Love Somebody is an album by the American musician Angela Bofill, released in 1993. Bofill supported the album with a North American tour.

== Production ==
The album was produced primarily by Eve Nelson. Bofill cowrote some of its songs.

== Critical reception ==
Professional ratings
Review scores
Source	Rating
AllMusic	2/5 stars
Entertainment Weekly	B+

Entertainment Weekly wrote that "songs like 'Always a Part of Me', a breezy ballad, prove she’s still a sensual soul siren." USA Today determined that Bofill "still has a rich, multi-octave voice, and a knack for penning ballads that stick to the ribs." The Orlando Sentinel stated that "syrupy synths clog the production much of the time, but Bofill keeps her vocals tasteful even when the setting is tacky."

== Track listing ==
No.	Title	Writer(s)	Length
1.	"I Wanna Love Somebody"	Eve Nelson	4:06
2.	"I Wonder"	Nelson	5:33
3.	"Never Too Much"	Angela Bofill; Nelson	4:30
4.	"Heavenly Love"	Bofill; Nelson	5:14
5.	"Always a Part of Me"	Steven Birch; Preston Glass; Darrell Smith	5:12
6.	"Te Amo"	Bofill; Nelson	4:49
7.	"Essence of My Light"	Nelson	5:12
8.	"I Still Believe in Love"	Bofill; Ann Curless; Nelson	4:50
9.	"We Almost Had It Right"	Nelson	3:42
10.	"Amor Celestial" (Spanish version of "Heavenly Love")	Bofill; Nelson	5:10

== Personnel ==
- Adam Kudzin – engineer, assistant engineer
- Amy Keyes – background vocals
- Andy Snitzer – saxophone
- Angela Bofill – vocals, background vocals
- Brenda White – background vocals
- Carl Burnett – guitar
- Chris Botti – trumpet
- Cindy Mizelle – background vocals
- Derek Jordan – background vocals
- Don Tittle – producer, engineer
- Duane Sexton – engineer, assistant engineer
- Earl Gardner – trumpet
- Eve Nelson – piano, arranger
- Francisco Centeno – bass guitar, background vocals
- Gerard Julien – engineer, assistant engineer
- Hugh Elliott – drums
- Jeff Mironov – guitar
- Joe Hornof – programming, drum sounds
- Joe Hornoff – synthesizer, programming, sound effects
- Kenny MacDougald – drums
- Kirk Whalum – saxophone
- Marc Shulman – guitar
- Michael Dumas – engineer, assistant engineer
- Neil Johnson – guitar
- Nigel Green – engineer, mixing
- Paulette McWilliams – background vocals
- Pete Christensen – background vocals, engineer, mixing
- Preston Glass – percussion, arranger, keyboards
- Rob Mullins – keyboards
- Scott Totten – guitar
- Steven Birch – programming
- Tao Gutierrez – percussion
- Tom Coyne – mastering
- Werner Vana Gierig – piano
- Wilton Felder – bass guitar
