= Love in Slow Motion (album) =

Studio album by Angela Bofill
- Released: April 23, 1996
- Genre: Soul, R&B
- Label: Shanachie Entertainment Corp.
- Producer: Andy Korn, Rex Rideout, Angela Bofill

Angela Bofill chronology
I Wanna Love Somebody (1993)	Love in Slow Motion (1996)	Live from Manila (2006)

Professional ratings
Review scores
Source	Rating
Allmusic	link
MSN Music Guide	link

Love in Slow Motion is a 1996 album recorded by the R&B vocalist Angela Bofill.

It was her first studio recording since I Wanna Love Somebody and the tenth released studio album before her stroke on January 10, 2006. This would be her final studio album before her death on June 13, 2024.

== Track listing ==
All songs were written by Angela Bofill and Rex Rideout, unless stated otherwise.

No.	Title	Writer(s)	Length
1.	"All She Wants (Is Love)"		4:34
2.	"Love in Slow Motion"	Angela Bofill; Rex Rideout; Narada Michael Walden	5:48
3.	"Real Love"		4:44
4.	"Galaxy of My Love"		5:24
5.	"Guess You Didn't Know"		4:32
6.	"Sail Away"		4:53
7.	"Are You Leaving Me Now?"	Bofill; Jon Rosen; Karen Manno	4:46
8.	"Let Them Talk"	Bofill; Cynthia Biggs	5:11
9.	"Soul of Mine"		4:42
10.	"Love Changes"	Bofill; Frederico González Peña	5:23
11.	"Black Angel"	Bofill	4:20

== Personnel ==
- Angela Bofill - vocals, co-producer
- Andy Korn - producer
