= The Beginning of It All =

Studio album by Ben E. King
- Released: January 3, 1972
- Genre: Soul
- Length: 38:31 (excluding interview track)
- Label: Mandala

Ben E. King chronology
Rough Edges (1970)	The Beginning of It All (1972)	Supernatural (1975)

The Beginning of It All is the eighth album by Ben E. King. King transferred to Mandala in 1972, and released his seventh studio album in 1972.

This was the final album to be released on a subsidiary label in the early years. After this release, King would transfer directly to Atlantic Records for a number of new releases.

== Track listing ==
All tracks composed by Ben E. King; except where indicated

1. "Take Me to the Pilot" (Elton John, Bernie Taupin) [3:38]
2. "I Guess It's Goodbye" [3:35]
3. "Travelin' Woman" [3:30]
4. "Love Is" [2:58]
5. "Into the Mystic" (Van Morrison) [3:42]
6. "White Moon" [2:35]
7. "Love Is Gonna Get You" [3:20]
8. "Beginning of It All" [3:22]
9. "Only You Know and I Know" (Dave Mason) [3:14]
10. "All of Your Tomorrows" [4:44]
11. "She Does It Right" [3:53]
12. Ben E. King's Audio Biography; Interview by Richard Robinson (album only) [40:02]
