= Rough Edges (album) =

Studio album by Ben E. King
- Released: July 7, 1970
- Genre: Soul
- Label: Maxwell Records
- Producer: Bob Crewe

Ben E. King chronology
Seven Letters (1965)	Rough Edges (1970)	The Beginning of It All (1972)

Rough Edges is the seventh album and sixth studio album by Ben E. King. After not making any new albums for a few years, King released this album with Maxwell, a subsidiary of Atlantic Records. This would be the only full-length LP released on Maxwell, with King transferring to Mandala in 1972.

Tracks 1, 3 and 5 are not medleys but (what are now known as) mash-ups, where he goes back and forth between each song throughout the track.

In a 1970 review of the album, The Macon News called it a "change of pace" from his earlier work that proves him as "one of the finest soul balladeers in the world today".

== Track listing ==
1. "She Lets Her Hair Down (Early in the Morning)"/"Little Green Apples" (Leon Carr, Paul Vance)/(Bobby Russell) (9:26)
2. "Wishing For Tomorrow" (Bob Crewe) (5:51)
3. "If You've Gotta Make a Fool of Somebody"/"Come Together" (Rudy Clark)/(John Lennon, Paul McCartney) (5:02)
4. "One Man" (Bob Crewe, Larry Brown) (6:25)
5. "In The Midnight Hour"/"Lay Lady Lay" (Steve Cropper, Wilson Pickett)/(Bob Dylan) (6:06)
6. "Don't Let Me Down" (John Lennon, Paul McCartney) (5:43)
7. "Tonight I'll Be Staying Here with You" (Bob Dylan) (5:10)
