= Supernatural Thing =

Single by Ben E. King

from the album Supernatural
- B-side: "Supernatural Thing Pt. 2"
- Released: 1975
- Recorded: 1974
- Genre: Funk
- Length: 4:12
- Label: Atlantic: 45-3241
- Songwriters: Haras Fyre (pseudonym Patrick Grant), Gwen Guthrie
- Producers: Tony Silvester, Bert DeCoteaux

Ben E. King singles chronology
"Spread Myself Around" (1973)	"Supernatural Thing" (1975)	"Do It in the Name of Love" (1975)

Official Audio
- "Supernatural Thing, Parts 1 & 2" on YouTube

"Supernatural Thing" is a song recorded by American soul and R&B singer Ben E. King. The single, released in 1975 by Atlantic Records, was a No. 1 hit on the U.S. Billboard Hot Soul Singles chart for one week. It also reached No. 5 on the Billboard Hot 100. "Supernatural Thing" was written by Haras Fyre (pseudonym Patrick Grant) and Gwen Guthrie and was produced by Tony Silvester and Bert DeCoteaux. The song was included on King's 1975 album Supernatural.

== Personnel ==
=== Musicians ===
- Al Caiola – guitar
- Ben E. King – vocals
- Charles McCracken – guitar
- Ernie Hayes – piano
- Gary Chester – drums
- Lloyd Trotman – bass
- Phil Kraus – percussion

=== Production ===
- Bert "Super Charts" De Coteaux – arranger
- Tony "Champagne" Silvester – producer

== Cover versions ==
- Rock band Siouxsie and the Banshees recorded it in 1981 as the B-side of their "Arabian Knights" single; it was later included on the band's 2004 Downside Up collection.
- American soul duo Charles & Eddie covered the song on the 1993 soundtrack album Addams Family Values: Music from the Motion Picture.
- British breakbeat producer Adam Freeland recorded a cover of the song for his 2003 album Now & Them, which was released as a single the following year.

== Popular culture ==
- The song was featured on the soundtrack to the 2020 film Spenser Confidential.

== See also ==
- List of number-one R&B singles of 1975 (U.S.)
