= Too Tough =

Studio album by Angela Bofill
- Released: January 2, 1983
- Recorded: 1982
- Genre: R&B; soul; dance-pop
- Label: Arista
- Producer: Angela Bofill; Narada Michael Walden

Angela Bofill chronology
| Something About You (1981) | Too Tough (1983) | Teaser (1983) |

Singles from Too Tough
- 1. "Too Tough / Rainbow Inside My Heart" Released: November 21, 1982; 2. "Tonight I Give In / Song for a Rainy Day" Released: April 14, 1983

Too Tough is the fourth studio album by the recording artist Angela Bofill, released on January 2, 1983. This was her second release through Arista Records, with Narada Michael Walden again serving as joint music producer.

== Reception ==
Professional ratings
Review scores
| Source | Rating |
|---|---|
| AllMusic | 4.5/5 stars |

Too Tough performed better on the charts than her previous album, Something About You. The title track, "Too Tough", laced with double entendre, became a sizable dancefloor hit, spending four weeks at number two on the Billboard Dance chart. It also peaked at number five on the Billboard soul chart. The remainder of the album has similar dance-pop songs and a few soulful ballads.

== Track listing ==
| No. | Title | Writer(s) | Length |
|---|---|---|---|
| 1. | "Too Tough" | Jeffrey Cohen; Narada Michael Walden | 5:36 |
| 2. | "Ain't Nothing Like the Real Thing" (feat. Boz Scaggs) | Nikolas Ashford; Valerie Simpson | 3:04 |
| 3. | "Tonight I Give In" | Lana Bogan; Donnie Shelton | 3:21 |
| 4. | "You Could Come Take Me Home" | Cohen; Walden | 3:51 |
| 5. | "Love You Too Much" | Gerard McMahon | 3:56 |
| 6. | "Is This a Dream" | Angela Bofill; Danny Madden; Eva Lee; Steve Gaboury | 5:11 |
| 7. | "Song for a Rainy Day" | Bofill | 3:37 |
| 8. | "I Can See It in Your Eyes" | Bofill; Madden; Lee; Gaboury | 3:31 |
| 9. | "Accept Me (I'm Not a Girl Anymore)" | Bofill | 3:34 |
| 10. | "Rainbow Inside My Heart" | Bofill | 3:44 |

== Personnel ==
- Angela Bofill - lead and backing vocals
- Narada Michael Walden - drums, keyboards, percussion
- Sheila Escovedo - percussion
- Nat Adderley, Jr., Steve Robbins, Frank Martin - keyboards
- Buddy Williams, Steve Ferrone - drums
- Randy Jackson, Francisco Centeno - bass guitar
- Corrado Rustici, Doc Powell, Peter Manu - guitar
- Fred Berry, Tim Acosta, Wayne Wallace - horns
- Marc Russo - saxophone
- Brian Atkinson - vibraphone
- Boz Scaggs - co-lead vocals (track 2)
- Jim Gilstrap, John Lehman, Kelly Kool, Myrna Matthews - backing vocals

== Charts ==
=== Weekly charts ===
| Chart (1983) | Peak position |
|---|---|
| US Billboard 200 | 40 |
| US Top R&B/Hip-Hop Albums (Billboard) | 6 |

=== Year-end charts ===
| Chart (1983) | Position |
|---|---|
| US Billboard 200 | 69 |
| US Top R&B/Hip-Hop Albums (Billboard) | 11 |

=== Singles ===
| Year | Single | Chart positions | | |
| Year | Single | US | US R&B | US Dance |
|---|---|---|---|---|
| 1983 | "Too Tough" | — | 5 | 2 |
| 1983 | "Tonight I Give In" | — | 12 | — |
