= Tsintskaro =

Georgian folk song

Tsintskaro (Georgian: წინწყარო) is a Georgian folk song from the Kakhetian region. Its title is the name of a village in the Kartli region, which translates as "at the spring water". The song is usually performed by a male vocalist and choir. Although this song is unfamiliar to most Westerners, its haunting melody has been used by Western artists, who have incorporated the song into their works of art, such as the 1979 Werner Herzog film Nosferatu the Vampyre, György Fehér's film Szürkület and the 1985 Kate Bush song "Hello Earth".
