= Angel of the Night =

Studio album by Angela Bofill
- Released: October 10, 1979
- Recorded: 1979
- Studio: A&R Studios (New York City, New York)
- Genre: Soul; jazz; R&B
- Length: 38:14
- Label: GRP Records
- Producer: Dave Grusin; Larry Rosen

Angela Bofill chronology
Angie (1978)	Angel of the Night (1979)	Something About You (1981)

Singles from Angel of the Night
- 1. "What I Wouldn't Do (For the Love of You) / Rainbow Child (Little Pas)" Released: December 7, 1979; 2. "Angel of the Night / Rainbow Child (Little Pas)" Released: April 21, 1980; 3. "People Make the World Go 'Round / Under the Moon and Over the Sky" Released: March 17, 2016

Professional ratings
Review scores
Source	Rating
Allmusic	4/5 stars

Angel of the Night is the second studio album by American R&B singer Angela Bofill. It was produced by GRP Records label heads Dave Grusin and Larry Rosen.

The album was digitally remastered and re-released on 2001 by Buddah Records.

== Track listing ==
All songs were written by Angela Bofill, unless stated otherwise.

No.	Title	Writer(s)	Length
1.	"I Try"		5:34
2.	"People Make the World Go 'Round"	Linda Creed; Thom Bell	4:32
3.	"Angel of the Night"	Bunny Hull; Jim Devlin	5:02
4.	"Rainbow Child (Little Pas)"		3:43
5.	"What I Wouldn't Do (For the Love of You)"	Jack Perricone; Denise Utt	3:29
6.	"The Feelin's Love"		5:07
7.	"Love To Last"	John Madden	4:54
8.	"The Voyage"		5:30
Total length:			38:14

== Personnel ==
- Angela Bofill - lead and backing vocals, acoustic piano
- Dave Grusin - acoustic and electric piano, synthesizer
- Eric Gale - guitar
- Ray Chew - acoustic and electric piano; horn and string arrangement on "People Make the World Go Round"
- Ed Walsh - Oberheim polyphonic synthesizer
- Buddy Williams, Paul Kimbarow - drums
- Francisco Centeno, Eluriel Tinker Barfield - bass guitar
- Ralph MacDonald - percussion
- Sammy Figueroa, Carol Steele - percussion, congas
- Eddie Daniels - tenor saxophone
- David Nadien - strings concertmaster
- Dave Tofani, David Taylor, Harold Vick, Henry Mitchell, Howard Johnson, Lew Soloff, Virgil Jones - horns
- Barry Finclair, Charles McCracken, Emanuel Vardi, Harry Glickman, Herbert Sorkin, John Pintavalle, Jonathan Abramowitz, Joseph Rabushka, Lamar Alsop, Louis Gabowitz, Marvin Morgenstern, Max Ellen, Richard Sortomme - strings
- Gwen Guthrie, Patti Austin, Connie Harvey, Ednah Holt, John Danny Madden, Vivian Cherry - backing vocals

== Charts ==
=== Weekly charts ===
Chart (1979–1980)	Peak position
US Billboard 200	34
US Top R&B/Hip-Hop Albums	10
US Top Jazz Albums	2

=== Year-end charts ===
Chart (1980)	Peak position
US Billboard 200	43
US Billboard R&B	12
US Billboard Jazz	5

=== Singles ===
Single	Chart	Position
"Angel of the Night"	US Billboard Hot R&B/Hip-Hop Songs	67
"What I Wouldn't Do (For the Love of You)"	US Billboard Hot R&B/Hip-Hop Songs	18
