= Something About You (Angela Bofill album) =

Studio album by Angela Bofill
- Released: October 28, 1981
- Recorded: 1981
- Genres: Soul; R&B
- Label: Arista
- Producer: Narada Michael Walden

Angela Bofill chronology
| Angel of the Night (1979) | Something About You (1981) | Too Tough (1983) |

Singles from Something About You
- 1. "Something About You / Time to Say Goodbye" Released: October 19, 1981; 2. "Holdin' Out for Love / Only Love" Released: January 21, 1982; 3. "Break It to Me Gently / Time to Say Goodbye" Released: April 7, 1982

Professional ratings
Review scores
| Source | Rating |
|---|---|
| Allmusic | 4/5 stars |

Something About You is the third studio album by American singer Angela Bofill, released in 1981 on Arista Records.

After the release of Angel of the Night, Bofill left GRP Records and joined its distributor Arista in hopes of expanding her crossover success. In spite of the controversies surrounding Bofill and GRP, the album managed to sell, but with less success than her first two albums.

In 2002, Something About You was digitally remastered and re-released on Arista Records with extra tracks.

== Track listing ==
| No. | Title | Writer(s) | Length |
|---|---|---|---|
| 1. | "Something About You" | Allee Willis; John Lewis Parker; Robert Wright | 4:03 |
| 2. | "Break It to Me Gently" | Doug Frank; Doug James | 3:52 |
| 3. | "On and On" | Alfred McCrary; Linda McCrary | 3:22 |
| 4. | "Tropical Love" | Jeff Cohen; Lisa Walden; Narada Michael Walden | 5:58 |
| 5. | "You Should Know By Now" | Bunny Hull; Earl Klugh | 3:29 |
| 6. | "Only Love" | Angela Bofill | 4:26 |
| 7. | "Holdin' Out for Love" | Cynthia Weil; Tom Snow | 3:22 |
| 8. | "Stop, Look, Listen (to Your Heart)" | Linda Creed; Thom Bell | 4:30 |
| 9. | "I Do Love You" | Willis; Walden | 4:33 |
| 10. | "Three Blind Mice" | Traditional | 0:17 |
| 11. | "Time to Say Goodbye" | Bofill | 5:19 |

2002 Remastered Edition bonus tracks
| No. | Title | Writer(s) | Producer(s) | Length |
|---|---|---|---|---|
| 12. | "Never Wanna Be Without Your Love" (feat. Narada Michael Walden) | Philippe Saisse; Jim di Prima | | 3:55 |
| 13. | "Esperando Al Amor" (Spanish version of "Holdin' Out for Love") | Weil; Snow | Dave Grusin; Larry Rosen | 3:46 |
| 14. | "Love Light" | Yutaka Yokokura; Marti McCall | Grusin; Rosen |
| 15. | "Rhythm of Your Mind" | Bofill | | 3:27 |

== Personnel ==
- Angela Bofill - lead and backing vocals
- Narada Michael Walden - drums, piano
- Randy Jackson, Rusty Allen - bass guitar
- Corrado Rustici, Earl Klugh, Joaquin Liévano - guitar
- Tower of Power - horns
- Paulinho Da Costa - percussion
- Frank Martin - keyboards, synthesizer, Rhodes piano
- Patrick Cowley, Greg Levias - synthesizer
- Marc Russo - saxophone
- Wayne Wallace - trombone
- Greg Adams, Mic Gillette - trumpet
- Larry Schneider - flute
- Andy Narell - steel drums
- Jim Gilstrap, John Lehman, Myrna Matthews, Scherrie Payne, Vicki Randle - backing vocals
- Michael Gibbs - conductor, string arrangements
- Clive Davis - executive producer

== Charts ==
=== Weekly charts ===
| Chart (1981) | Peak position |
|---|---|
| US Billboard 200 | 61 |
| US Top R&B/Hip-Hop Albums (Billboard) | 13 |

=== Year-end charts ===
| Chart (1982) | Position |
|---|---|
| US Top R&B/Hip-Hop Albums (Billboard) | 44 |

=== Singles ===
| Year | Single | Chart positions |
| Year | Single | US R&B |
|---|---|---|
| 1982 | "Holdin' Out For Love" | 26 |
| 1982 | "Something About You" | 21 |
