= Cloudbusting =

1985 single by Kate Bush

Single by Kate Bush

from the album Hounds of Love
- B-side: "Burning Bridge"; "My Lagan Love"
- Released: 14 October 1985
- Studio: Windham Farm Home Studio (Welling, England); Windmill Lane Studios (Dublin, Ireland)
- Genre: Baroque pop; art rock
- Length: 5:06 (song); 6:59 (video)
- Label: EMI
- Songwriter: Kate Bush
- Producer: Kate Bush

Kate Bush singles chronology
"Running Up That Hill" (1985)	"Cloudbusting" (1985)	"Hounds of Love" (1986)

Music video
- "Cloudbusting" on YouTube

Audio sample
- file; help

"Cloudbusting" is a song written, produced and performed by English singer Kate Bush. It was released as a single on October 14, 1985, and was the second single released from her fifth studio album Hounds of Love (1985). The single peaked at No. 20 and spent 8 weeks in the UK Singles Chart.

Taking inspiration from the 1973 Peter Reich memoir A Book of Dreams, which Bush read and found deeply moving, the song is about the very close relationship between psychiatrist and philosopher Wilhelm Reich and his young son, Peter, told from the point of view of the mature Peter. It describes the boy's memories of his life with Reich on their family farm, called Orgonon, where the two spent time "cloudbusting", a supposed rain-making process which involved using a machine designed and built by Reich – a machine called a cloudbuster – to point at the sky. The lyrics further describe the elder Reich's abrupt arrest and imprisonment, the pain of loss the young Peter felt, and his helplessness at being unable to protect his father.

In 2014, the song was performed live for the first time and was also chosen as the closing encore track in Bush's 2014 live residency, Before the Dawn.

== Release ==
In the United Kingdom, "Cloudbusting" was released as a single on 14 October 1985, with a new non-album track titled "Burning Bridge" as its B-side. The twelve-inch single also contained a remix of "Cloudbusting" carrying the subtitle of the "Organon Mix", and "My Lagan Love", which featured additional lyrics written by Bush. In the United States, "Cloudbusting" was released as a single on March 30, 1987.

== Critical reception ==
In a retrospective review of the single, AllMusic journalist Amy Hanson praised the song for its "magnificence" and "hypnotic mantric effects". Hanson wrote: "Safety and danger are threaded through the song, via both a thoughtful lyric and a compulsive cello-driven melody. Even more startling, but hardly surprising, is the ease with which Bush was able to capture the moment when a child first realizes that adults are fallible."

== Music video ==
The music video, directed by Julian Doyle, was conceived by Terry Gilliam and Kate Bush as a short film. The video features Canadian actor Donald Sutherland playing the role of Wilhelm Reich, and Bush in the role of his young son, Peter.

Filming took place at the Vale of White Horse in Oxfordshire, England. From the eminence on which the machine is positioned can be glimpsed the bald chalk top of Dragon Hill, immediately below the Uffington White Horse, a prehistoric hill carving which can be seen briefly in a couple of the shots. Bush found out in which hotel Sutherland was staying from actress Julie Christie's hairdresser and went to his room to personally ask him to participate in the project.

In the UK, the music video was shown at some cinemas as an accompaniment to the main feature. Due to difficulties on obtaining a work visa for Sutherland at short notice, the actor offered to work on the video for free. Although the events depicted in the story took place in Maine, the newspaper clipping in the music video reads The Oregon Times, likely a reference to Reich's home and laboratory "Orgonon".

According to a 26 October 1985 article published in Record Mirror, the cloudbuster device was sourced from a gynecologist exhibition held in a nearby town. Bush provided a different account, saying that the machine was designed and constructed by people who worked on the Xenomorph. It bears only a superficial resemblance to the real cloudbusters, which were smaller and with multiple narrow, straight tubes and pipes, and were operated while standing on the ground. In a reference to the source material of the song, Bush pulls a copy of Peter Reich's A Book of Dreams from Sutherland's coat.

The full-length video features a longer version of the song, which is different from the Organon Mix released on 12-inch vinyl. This version was commercially available on "The Red Shoes" single.

Around the time of the release Bush sent Peter Reich a VHS copy of the music video. Reich was immediately a fan. He later told Dazed magazine "Quite magically, this British musician had tapped precisely into a unique and magical fulfilment of father-son devotion, emotion and understanding. They had captured it all."

The music video for "Cloudbusting" won an award at the International Music Video Festival for the best storyboard under the high-budget production category.

== Track listing ==
The B-side to the single was "Burning Bridge", in which a woman desperately pleads with her lover to step up his level of commitment to her. The 12" featured the additional track "My Lagan Love", a traditional Irish melody with lyrics by John Carder Bush, Kate Bush's brother. The 12" version of "Cloudbusting" was a special remix called "The Organon Re-Mix" in which the verses were downplayed and the main focus was the development of the song's chorus. In the US, this mix was issued as "The Meteorological Mix", a title used in the UK for 12" version of Bush's later single "The Big Sky".

7-inch single (UK)
No.	Title	Length
1.	"Cloudbusting"	5:08
2.	"Burning Bridge"	4:38

12-inch single (UK)
No.	Title	Length
1.	"Cloudbusting" (The Organon re-mix)	6:34
2.	"Burning Bridge"	4:38
3.	"My Lagan Love"	2:31

CD single (US)
No.	Title	Length
1.	"Cloudbusting"	5:09
2.	"The Man with the Child in His Eyes"	2:41
3.	"Sat in Your Lap"	3:31
4.	"Cloudbusting" (Organon mix, listed as "Meteorological mix")	6:31

== Personnel ==
- Kate Bush – lead and backing vocals, keyboards, string arrangements
- Stuart Elliott – drums
- Charlie Morgan – drums
- Paddy Bush – backing vocals
- John Carder Bush – backing vocals
- Del Palmer – backing vocals
- Brian Bath – backing vocals
- The Medici String Sextet – strings
- Dave Lawson – string arrangements

== Charts ==
Weekly chart performance for "Cloudbusting"
Chart (1985)	Peak position
Belgium (Ultratop 50 Flanders)	16
Europe (European Top 100 Singles)	25
Irish Singles Chart	13
Luxembourg (Radio Luxembourg)	14
Netherlands (Dutch Top 40)	11
Netherlands (Single Top 100)	13
UK Singles Chart	20
West Germany (Media Control Charts)	20

Chart (2019)	Peak position
UK Physical Singles (OCC)	1
UK Vinyl Singles (OCC)	1
UK Singles Singles (OCC)	37
US Alternative Digital Song Sales	22

Chart (2022)	Peak position
UK Singles Downloads (Official Charts)	41

In Australia, "Cloudbusting" narrowly missed the Kent Music Report top 100 singles chart in January 1986.

== Certifications ==
Region	Certification	Certified units/sales
United Kingdom (BPI)	Gold	400,000^{‡}
^{‡} Sales+streaming figures based on certification alone.

== Cover versions ==
In 1992, Utah Saints sampled the song's line "I just know that something good is gonna happen" for their song "Something Good" as well as scenes from Bush's video for their video. It reached No. 4 on the UK Singles Chart and No. 8 when re-mixed and re-released in 2008 (the latter of which used a different sample from another artist).

Canadian musician Matthew Good covered "Cloudbusting" on his 2015 album Chaotic Neutral. Good's cover version featured Holly McNarland on backing vocals.
