= Let Me Be the One (Angela Bofill song) =

Single by Angela Bofill

from the album Let Me Be the One
- B-side: "Love Me for Today"
- Released: February 8, 1985
- Recorded: 1984
- Genre: R&B
- Length: 3:23
- Label: Arista
- Songwriters: Angela Bofill, Rick Suchow, Alan Palanker
- Producers: David Frank & Mic Murphy (The System)

Angela Bofill singles chronology
"Can't Slow Down" (1984)	"Let Me Be the One" (1985)	"Who Knows You Better" (1985)

"Let Me Be the One" is the title of a hit single by acclaimed jazz / R&B vocalist Angela Bofill and was the title track and second single release from her 1984 album Let Me Be the One. The song was produced by David Frank and Mic Murphy of the System and was written by Angela Bofill, Rick Suchow and Alan Palanker. The single peaked at No. 84 on the US R&B Billboard chart.

The song was later released on several Angela Bofill "best of" collections, including "The Best of Angela Bofill", "The Definitive Collection", and "Angela Bofill: Platinum and Gold Collection", all released by Arista Records. A live version was released as well, on her 2006 CD Live From Manila on the Black Angel label.

This song was used in a song called "The One" by Jon Phonics.
