= Let Me Be the One (album) =

Studio album by Angela Bofill
- Released: October 25, 1984
- Recorded: 1984
- Genre: R&B
- Length: 33:53
- Label: Arista
- Producer: The System

Angela Bofill chronology
Teaser (1983)	Let Me Be the One (1984)	Tell Me Tomorrow (1985)

Singles from Let Me Be the One
- 1. "Can't Slow Down / No Love in Sight" Released: November 8, 1984; 2. "Let Me Be the One / Love Me For Today" Released: February 8, 1985; 3. "Who Knows You Better / No Love in Sight" Released: April 15, 1985

Professional ratings
Review scores
Source	Rating
AllMusic	2/5 stars
MSN Music Guide	1.5/5 stars

Let Me Be the One is the sixth studio album by American R&B singer Angela Bofill, released on October 25, 1984, by Arista Records.

Let Me Be the One was produced by David Frank and Mic Murphy who, at the time, were enjoying much success as the System. Let Me Be the One was much more synth-heavy R&B flavored than her earlier jazz-oriented works. The title song peaked at No. 84 on the Billboard R&B Chart.

== Track listing ==
No.	Title	Writer(s)	Length
1.	"Can't Slow Down"	David Frank; Mic Murphy	5:09
2.	"Let Me Be the One"	Angela Bofill; Rick Suchow; Alan Palanker	3:28
3.	"Who Knows You Better"	Stephen Geyer; Gary Stockdale	3:31
4.	"You're Always There"	Bofill; Frank; Murphy	5:19
5.	"Getting into Love"	Frank; Murphy	4:41
6.	"No Love in Sight"	Bofill; Loree Gold	3:24
7.	"Love Me for Today"	Bofill; Palanker; Derrik Hoitsma	4:23
8.	"This Is the Start"	Frank; Murphy; Paul Pesco; Ian McDonald	4:38

== Personnel ==
Credits are adapted from the Let Me Be the One liner notes.

- Angela Bofill – vocals
- Alan Palanker – keyboards
- Mario Salvati – engineer
- Rick Sanchez – engineer
- Alex Haas – assistant engineer
- Michael Brauer – engineer, mixing
- Carl Beatty – mixing
- Mickey Leonard – guitar
- Paul Pesco – guitar, drum programming
- William "Doc" Powell – guitar
- David Frank – keyboards, producer, drum programming
- Sandy Bofill – background vocals
- Cindy Mizelle – background vocals
- Lisa Fischer – background vocals
- Michelle Cobbs – background vocals
- Mic Murphy – background vocals, producer
- Marc Russo – saxophone
- Eluriel Tinker Barfield – bass guitar
- Yogi Horton – drums

== Charts ==
Chart (1984)	Peak position
U.S. Billboard R&B Albums	39
