= Ain't Nothin' Goin' On but the Rent =

Single by Gwen Guthrie

from the album Good to Go Lover
- B-side: "Passion Eyes"
- Released: 1986
- Genre: Dance-R&B
- Length: 5:59
- Label: Polydor
- Songwriter: Gwen Guthrie
- Producer: Gwen Guthrie

Gwen Guthrie singles chronology
| "Just for You" (1985) | "Ain't Nothin' Goin' On but the Rent" (1986) | "Seventh Heaven" (1986) |

"Ain't Nothin' Goin' On but the Rent" is a song by American singer-songwriter Gwen Guthrie. It was released in 1986 as the lead single from her fourth album, Good to Go Lover (1986), on Polydor Records. It was both written and produced by Guthrie, becoming the biggest hit of her career, and the song's title became a semi-popular catchphrase among many women throughout the late 1980s and early 1990s. The single peaked at number five in the UK, but hit number one in New Zealand, Zimbabwe and on the US Billboard Hot Dance Club Play. In 1993, it was remixed and again charted in the UK, peaking at number 42. In 2005, Blender listed "Ain't Nothin' Goin' On but the Rent" at number 339 on its list of "Greatest Songs Since You Were Born".

== Critical reception ==
Alan Jones from Music Week gave the 1993 remix three out of five. He wrote, "A disappointing seven-inch remix by Nigel Wright is stale and one-dimensional, but the original, still sounding fresh, and a radical E-Lustrious remix are more than enough to score a hit." James Hamilton from the Record Mirror Dance Update noted, "1986 garage anthem's radical blippily thundering E-Lusirious, breezily soulful Nigel Wright Remixes, ponderously lurching Original".

== Chart performance ==
The song charted moderately on the US pop chart (reaching number 42 on the Billboard Hot 100), but faring better on the Billboard R&B chart where it spent one week at number-one and on the Billboard Hot Dance Club Play chart where it spent two weeks at the top. The song peaked at number one in New Zealand and Zimbabwe, and was also successful in parts of Europe, reaching number five on the UK Singles Chart. The 1993 remix reached number eight on the UK Dance Singles Chart.

== Charts ==
=== Weekly charts ===
| Chart (1986–1987) | Peak position |
|---|---|
| Australia (Kent Music Report) | 75 |
| Belgium (Ultratop 50 Flanders) | 28 |
| Europe (European Hot 100 Singles) | 40 |
| Ireland (IRMA) | 6 |
| Israel (Israeli Singles Chart) | 24 |
| Netherlands (Dutch Top 40) | 29 |
| Netherlands (Single Top 100) | 25 |
| New Zealand (Recorded Music NZ) | 1 |
| Quebec (ADISQ) | 27 |
| Sweden (Sverigetopplistan) | 17 |
| UK Singles (Official Charts) | 5 |
| US Billboard Hot 100 | 42 |
| US Dance Club Songs (Billboard) | 1 |
| US Dance Singles Sales (Billboard) | 3 |
| US Hot R&B/Hip-Hop Songs (Billboard) | 1 |
| West Germany (GfK) | 21 |
| Zimbabwe (ZIMA) | 1 |

| Chart (1993) | Peak position |
|---|---|
| UK Singles (OCC) | 42 |
| UK Airplay (ERA) | 50 |
| UK Dance (Music Week) | 8 |
| UK Club Chart (Music Week) | 4 |

=== Year-end charts ===
| Chart (1986) | Position |
|---|---|
| UK Singles (OCC) | 53 |

| Chart (1987) | Position |
|---|---|
| New Zealand (Recorded Music NZ) | 48 |

== See also ==
- List of number-one dance singles of 1986 (U.S.)
- List of number-one R&B singles of 1986 (U.S.)
