= Haras Fyre =

- Fyre in his studio, 2026

Background information
- Born: Haras Fyre; January 5, 1953 (age 73); Newark, New Jersey, U.S.
- Genres: Pop; R&B; disco; dance-pop
- Occupations: Songwriter; singer; pianist; bassist
- Years active: 1971–present
- Website: fyre.ch

Haras Fyre (born January 5, 1953), also credited professionally as Patrick Grant, is an American songwriter, singer, pianist, and bassist. Early in his career, he and his then-partner Gwen Guthrie wrote songs for Sister Sledge and Ben E. King, including "Supernatural Thing" and "This Time I'll Be Sweeter". He later toured with The Drifters and settled in Basel, Switzerland, where he composes music for televised sport, corporate events, and private functions.

== Early life ==
Fyre was born and raised in Newark, New Jersey. As a teenager, he taught himself his brother's trombone from recordings of the band Chicago. He took up the bass guitar while playing with Parkway North of East Orange, New Jersey, on a Baldwin bass lent to him by bassist Romeo Williams.

== Career ==
=== Early bands and songwriting with Gwen Guthrie ===
In 1971, Fyre joined the local band the Matchmakers, where he met vocalist and pianist Gwen Guthrie. The two became a couple and joined Larry Blackmon's New York City band East Coast, a forerunner of his later group Cameo, together with Matchmakers members James Wheeler (saxophone) and Jerome McCoggle (trumpet). Benny Ashburn, manager of The Commodores, helped promote their songs, and their demos drew the interest of producer Bert DeCoteaux of Penumbra Music, whose offices were in the Brill Building.

=== Sister Sledge and Ben E. King ===
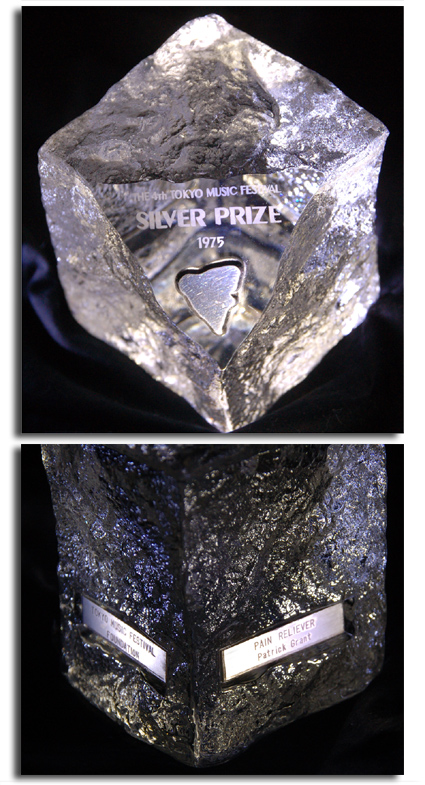
Silver Prize of the 1975 Tokyo Music Festival for "Pain Reliever"

Shortly after leaving East Coast, Fyre and Guthrie had their first international success as songwriters: Sister Sledge's "Love Don't You Go Through No Changes on Me" reached number 5 on the Billboard dance chart, number 31 on the R&B chart, and number 92 on the Hot 100. Fyre and Guthrie wrote seven of the nine songs on the group's debut album Circle of Love (1975); "Pain Reliever" also reached the top 10 of the US dance chart and won the Silver Award at the 1975 Tokyo Music Festival.

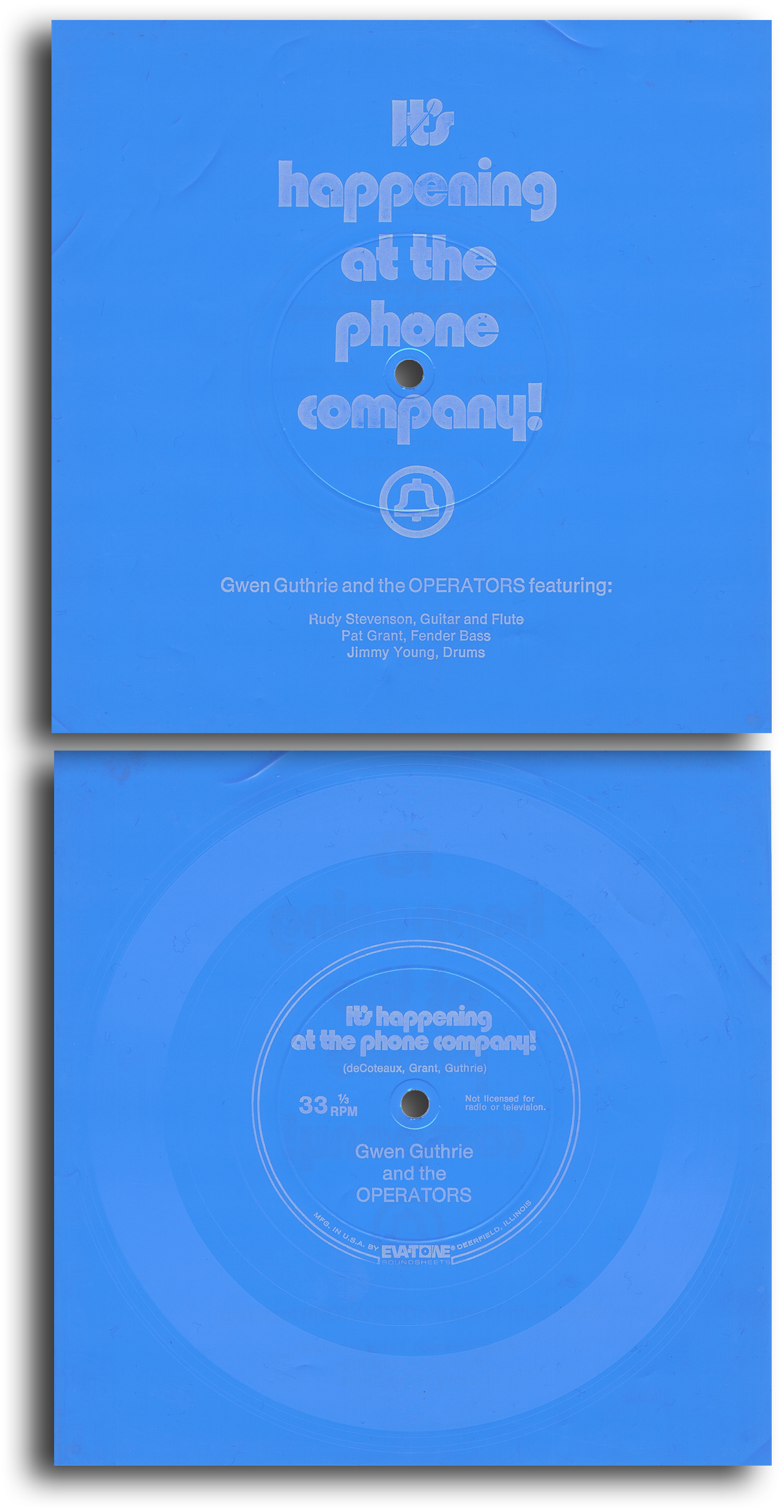
Promotional Evatone recording of "It's Happening at the Phone Company" (AT&T)

For Ben E. King, the duo wrote the comeback single "Supernatural Thing" and its follow-up "Do It in the Name of Love", which reached number 4 on the US R&B chart, as well as "This Time I'll Be Sweeter", which has since been recorded by numerous artists. On Circle of Love, Fyre is credited as a bassist under the name Patrick Grant, alongside Bob Babbitt, whom he has called his musical role model. With Guthrie, he also wrote the AT&T jingle "It's Happening at the Phone Company", which the pair performed at international trade fairs with drummer Jimmie Young, Rudy Stevenson, and Bert DeCoteaux on piano. As a session player, he worked regularly with drummer Herschel Dwellingham, pianist Nat Adderley Jr., and singer Bobby Hill.

After the duo parted ways with Penumbra Music, Guthrie became a session singer; Fyre wrote "Satan's Daughter" with Guthrie, which appeared on Gary Glitter's album G.G.

=== The Drifters ===
Through Ben E. King, Fyre moved to London to join the backing band of The Drifters, whose lineup included Johnny Moore, Billy Lewis, Joe Blunt, and Clyde Brown. He toured with the group for two years, then lived in Connecticut for four years.

=== Europe ===
Fyre then settled permanently in Switzerland. He composes music for televised sporting events, corporate functions, and private events, and has performed for the Allianz insurance group and at Formula One events, appearing in television segments with Mercedes-Benz motorsport chief Norbert Haug. He appeared on European television as a spokesman for the vehicle-inspection company DEKRA, and performed several times with rhythmic gymnast Magdalena Brzeska, for whom he composed a song. He lives in Basel.

== Filmography (songwriting credits) ==
- 2025: The Pickup – "Supernatural Thing, Pt. 1"
- 2025: Poppa's House (TV series, one episode) – "Supernatural Thing, Pt. 1"
- 2020: Spenser Confidential – "Supernatural Thing, Pt. 1"
- 2019: Killers Anonymous – "Supernatural Thing"
- 2017: This Time I'll Be Sweeter – "This Time I'll Be Sweeter"
- 2009: Notorious – "Letter to B.I.G." (written with Jadakiss, Faith Evans, Needlz, Duane DaRock Ramos and Gwen Guthrie; credited as "P. Grant"; interpolates "This Time I'll Be Sweeter")
- 1998: Very Bad Things – "Supernatural Thing (Remix)"
- 1983: Friends in Love – "This Time I'll Be Sweeter"

== Selected songwriting credits ==
- "Love Don't You Go Through No Changes on Me" – Sister Sledge (with Gwen Guthrie)
- Seven songs on Circle of Love – Sister Sledge (with Gwen Guthrie)
- "Pain Reliever" – Sister Sledge
- "Supernatural Thing" – Ben E. King (with Gwen Guthrie)
- "Do It in the Name of Love" – Ben E. King (with Gwen Guthrie)
- "This Time I'll Be Sweeter" – Ben E. King (with Gwen Guthrie)
- "It's Happening at the Phone Company" – AT&T jingle (with Gwen Guthrie)
- "Satan's Daughter" – G.G. (Gary Glitter), credited to Haras Fyre and Gwen Guthrie
