= Gwen Guthrie =

American singer-songwriter (1950–1999)

- Born: Gwendolyn Guthrie; July 9, 1950; Newark, New Jersey, U.S.
- Died: February 3, 1999 (aged 48)
- Genres: R&B; soul; post-disco; dance-pop
- Occupations: Singer; songwriter; pianist
- Instruments: Vocals; piano
- Years active: 1974–1999
- Labels: Island; Garage; Polydor; Warner Bros.; Reprise

Gwendolyn Guthrie (July 9, 1950 – February 3, 1999) was an American singer-songwriter and pianist who also sang backing vocals for Aretha Franklin, Billy Joel, Stevie Wonder, Peter Tosh, The Limit and Madonna, among others, and who wrote songs made famous by Ben E. King, Angela Bofill and Roberta Flack. Guthrie is well known for her 1986 anthem "Ain't Nothin' Goin' On but the Rent", and for her 1986 cover of the song "(They Long to Be) Close to You."

== Background ==
Guthrie was born and raised in Newark, New Jersey. In school, she studied classical music, and her father began teaching her piano when she was eight years old.

== Career ==
=== 1970s ===
By the early 1970s, Guthrie had joined vocal groups such as the Ebonettes and the Matchmakers, while working as an elementary school teacher. She also sang in the group East Coast, alongside Cameo singer Larry Blackmon. She was a backup singer on Aretha Franklin's 1974 single "I'm in Love".

Guthrie soon began moonlighting as a singer of commercial jingles, sometimes with her friend Valerie Simpson of Ashford & Simpson fame. A song-writing partnership with then-boyfriend, trombonist/bassist Haras Fyre (professionally known as "Patrick Grant") resulted in Ben E. King's comeback single "Supernatural Thing," an R&B #1 (#5 pop) hit in 1975, and the follow-up, "Do It In the Name of Love (#4 R&B). They also wrote "This Time I'll Be Sweeter" for Angela Bofill, which was later covered by numerous artists. Together they wrote seven tracks on Sister Sledge's 1975 album Circle of Love. "Cross My Heart", "Protect Our Love", "Love Don't You Go Through No Changes on Me", "Don't You Miss Him Now", "Pain Reliever", "You're Much Better Off Loving Me", and "Fireman". She also wrote Roberta Flack's "God Don't Like Ugly".

=== 1980s ===
In 1981, she sang a duet of Mitchell and Harris's "Nothing But Love" with Peter Tosh on his album Wanted Dread and Alive.

As Guthrie's solo career developed, she worked extensively with Sly and Robbie on dub-influenced club cuts and began racking up dance hits. She was dubbed "The First Lady of the Paradise Garage," as several of her songs became anthems at that venue, helped by the frequent and dynamic performances she gave there. She soon teamed musically with famed Paradise Garage DJ Larry Levan and recorded her first major landmark hit "Padlock" in 1983 with the Compass Point All Stars in Nassau, Bahamas, which became a club and radio hit two years later. She also sang backup on Madonna's 1983 debut album."

Guthrie recorded the single "Hopscotch". Along with "Bad Lady" by Stone City Band and "It's You I Love (So in Love)" by Pamela Nivens and Skip to My Lou" by Finis Henderson III, it was one of the mentioned black contemporary Up and Coming singles in the 11 June issue of Cash Box.

In 1984, Guthrie was featured on the club hit Say Yeah with the group The Limit featuring Dutch producers Bernard Oattes and Rob van Schaik. The track reached number 17 in the UK singles chart. Guthrie was also executive producer and singer on the minor hit "Naughty Times" by Cutty also released in 1984 on Hudson River Records.

Guthrie is probably best known for her 1986 dance anthem "Ain't Nothin' Goin' On but the Rent", a self-written and produced track that garnered some controversy for its materialistic lyrics such as: "You've got to have a j-o-b if you want to be with me/No romance without finance."

"Ain't Nothin' Goin' On but the Rent" was later sampled by numerous dance and hip hop artists, notably by Foxy Brown in her 1998 song "JOB" featuring Mýa, and by Utah Saints for the original version of their hit "What Can You Do for Me." The song is referenced in the Eddie Murphy monologue "No Romance without Finance" in his Eddie Murphy Raw comedy special. Guthrie also had a hit in 1986 with a cover of "(They Long to Be) Close to You," which reached number twenty-five on the UK Singles Chart the same year.

Her 1988 single "Can't Love You Tonight" boldly addressed AIDS at a time when the disease was a rather taboo subject. Guthrie was an ally of the gay community, and of people with AIDS. Proceeds from the single went to the AIDS Coalition.

=== 1990s ===
Other club hits by Guthrie include the Compass Point All Stars-produced "Seventh Heaven," "Peanut Butter," and "Peek-a-Boo." "Padlock" was later covered by M People, who included it on their 1995 album Bizarre Fruit, featuring vocalist Heather Small.

=== Death ===
Guthrie died of uterine cancer on February 3, 1999, at the age of 48, and was interred at Fairmount Cemetery in Newark, New Jersey.

== Discography ==
=== Studio albums ===
Year	Title	Peak chart positions					Record label
Year	Title	US	US R&B	AUS	NZ	UK	Record label
1982	Gwen Guthrie	208	28	—	36	—	Island
1983	Portrait	—	—	—	42	—	Island
1985	Just for You	—	55	—	—	—	Island
1986	Good to Go Lover	89	20	99	17	42	Polydor
1988	Lifeline	—	—	—	—	—	Warner Bros.
1990	Hot Times	—	—	—	—	—	Reprise
"—" denotes a recording that did not chart or was not released in that territory.

=== Extended plays ===
Year	Title	Peak	Record label
Year	Title	US R&B	Record label
1985	Padlock	47	Garage/Island Trading Co.

=== Compilation albums ===
- Ticket to Ride (1987, 4th & B'way)
- Ultimate Collection (1999, Hip-O)

=== Singles ===
Year	Title	Peak chart positions								Certifications	Album
Year	Title	US	US R&B	US Dan	AUS	GER	IRE	NZ	UK	Certifications	Album
1981	"Nothing But Love" (with Peter Tosh)	—	43	—	—	—	—	—	—		Wanted Dread & Alive
1982	"It Should Have Been You"	—	27	11	—	—	—	26	—		Gwen Guthrie
1982	"Peek-A-Boo"	—	—	—	—	—	—	—	—		Gwen Guthrie
1982	"For You (With a Melody Too)" (Remix)	—	—	—	—	—	—	—	—		Gwen Guthrie
1983	"Peanut Butter"	—	83	—	—	—	—	—	—		Portrait
1983	"Hopscotch"	—	—	—	—	—	—	—	105		Portrait
1984	"Say Yeah" (with The Limit)	—	81	7	—	—	25	—	17		Love Attaxx
1984	"Love in Moderation"	110	17	—	—	—	—	—	102		Just for You
1985	"Just for You"	—	53	—	—	—	—	—	—		Just for You
1985	"Padlock" (Special Mix by Larry Levan)	102	25	22 (Note: "Padlock" also charted at #13 on the Hot Dance/Disco Club Play chart along with all tracks from the album Padlock.)	—	—	—	—	—		Padlock
1985	"Peanut Butter" (Special Mix by Larry Levan)	—	75	13	—	—	—	—	—		Padlock
1985	"Seventh Heaven" (Special Mix by Larry Levan)	—	—	13	—	—	—	—	85		Padlock
1986	"Ain't Nothin' Goin' On but the Rent"	42	1	1	75	21	6	1	5	BPI: Silver	Good to Go Lover
1986	"Outside in the Rain"	—	51	—	—	—	—	—	37		Good to Go Lover
1986	"Good to Go Lover"	—	—	—	—	—	—	—	37		Good to Go Lover
1986	"(They Long to Be) Close to You"	—	69	—	—	—	19	9	25		Good to Go Lover
1987	"Friends & Lovers" (with Boris Gardiner)	—	—	—	—	—	—	—	97		—N/a
1987	"Ticket to Ride" (Special Mix by Larry Levan)	—	—	—	—	—	—	—	—		Ticket to Ride
1988	"Family Affair" (Special Mix by Larry Levan)	—	—	—	—	—	—	—	114		Ticket to Ride
1988	"Can't Love You Tonight"	—	83	44	—	—	—	—	79		Lifeline
1988	"Rockin' Chair"	—	—	—	—	—	—	—	—		Lifeline
1990	"Miss My Love"	—	—	27	—	—	—	—	184		Hot Times
1991	"Say It Isn't So"	—	—	—	—	—	—	—	—		Hot Times
1991	"Sweet Bitter Love"	—	74	—	—	—	—	—	—		Hot Times
1992	"Eyes (You Never Really Cared)"	—	—	—	—	—	—	—	95		—N/a
1993	"Ain't Nothin' Goin' On but the Rent" (1993 Remix)	—	—	—	—	—	—	—	42		—N/a
1993	"This Christmas Eve"	—	—	—	—	—	—	—	—		—N/a
"—" denotes a recording that did not chart or was not released in that territory.
