= Anthology (Ben E. King album) =

Greatest hits album by Ben E. King
- Released: April 20, 1993
- Genre: Soul
- Length: 1:09:47 (Disc 1); 1:10:15 (Disc 2); 2:20:02
- Label: Rhino Records / Wea

Ben E. King chronology
| What's Important to Me (1991) | Anthology (1993) | Shades of Blue (1993) |

Anthology was released in 1993 and remains the biggest single Ben E. King album to date. This two-disc collection spans 50 songs covering his entire career to this point.

== Track listing ==
=== Disc 1 ===
1. "There Goes My Baby" – 2:13
2. "Dance with Me" – 2:23
3. "This Magic Moment" – 2:29
4. "Lonely Winds" – 2:49
5. "Save the Last Dance for Me" – 2:29
6. "I Count the Tears" – 2:08
7. "Brace Yourself" – 2:09
8. "Show Me the Way" – 2:19
9. "Spanish Harlem" – 2:52
10. "First Taste of Love" – 2:21
11. "Young Boys Blues" – 2:17
12. "Stand by Me" – 3:00
13. "On the Horizon" – 2:19
14. "Here Comes the Night" – 2:25
15. "Amor" – 2:54
16. "Ecstasy" – 2:33
17. "Yes" – 3:04
18. "Walking in the Footsteps of a Fool" – 2:41
19. "Don't Play That Song (You Lied)" – 2:53
20. "How Can I Forget" – 2:20
21. "Gypsy" – 2:44
22. "I (Who Have Nothing)" – 2:28
23. "What Now My Love" – 2:39
24. "Groovin'" – 2:11
25. "That's When It Hurts" – 3:16
26. "Let the Water Run Down" – 2:35
27. "It's All Over" – 3:16

=== Disc 2 ===
1. "River of Tears" – 2:27
2. "Seven Letters" – 2:52
3. "The Record (Baby I Love You)" – 2:34
4. "She's Gone Again" – 2:30
5. "Cry No More" – 2:56
6. "Goodnight My Love" – 2:40
7. "So Much Love" – 3:16
8. "I Swear by Stars Above" – 2:47
9. "What Is Soul" – 2:26
10. "A Man Without a Dream" – 3:03
11. "Tears Tears Tears" – 3:22
12. "We Got a Thing Going On" – 2:54
13. "Don't Take Your Love from Me" – 2:51
14. "It's Amazing" – 2:54
15. "Til I Can't Take It Anymore" – 3:12
16. "It Ain't Fair" – 2:44
17. "Hey Little One" – 2:46
18. "Supernatural Thing - Part I" – 3:22
19. "Do It in the Name of Love" – 3:34
20. "I Had a Love" – 3:38
21. "Get It Up for Love" – 3:50
22. "A Star in the Ghetto" – 3:53
23. "Music Trance" – 3:44
