= Stand by Me: The Ultimate Collection =

The Ultimate Collection: Stand by Me

Compilation album by Ben E. King
- Released: 1987
- Recorded: December 17, 1959 — March 17, 1975
- Studio: New York; Los Angeles
- Genre: Soul
- Length: 56:31
- Label: Atlantic

Ben E. King chronology
Save the Last Dance for Me (1987)	The Ultimate Collection: Stand by Me (1987)	What's Important to Me (1991)

Professional ratings
Review scores
Source	Rating
AllMusic	4/5 stars
The New Rolling Stone Album Guide	4/5 stars

The Ultimate Collection: Stand by Me is a compilation album by American musician Ben E. King. It was released in 1987 via Atlantic Records.

The album includes many hits such as "Stand by Me", the original "Spanish Harlem", and "Young Boy Blues".

== Track listing ==
No.	Title	Writer(s)	Length
1.	"Stand by Me"	Benjamin Earl Nelson; Jerry Leiber; Mike Stoller	3:01
2.	"Save the Last Dance for Me" (with the Drifters)	Jerome Solon Felder; Mortimer Shuman	2:29
3.	"I (Who Have Nothing)"	Carlo Donida; Leiber; Stoller	2:29
4.	"That's When It Hurts"	Jerry Wexler; Bert Berns	3:07
5.	"I Could Have Danced All Night"	Alan Jay Lerner; Frederick Loewe	2:34
6.	"First Taste of Love"	Felder; Harvey Phillip Spector	2:32
7.	"Dream Lover"	Bobby Darin	2:41
8.	"Moon River"	Henry Mancini; Johnny Mercer	2:55
9.	"Spanish Harlem"	Leiber; Spector	3:01
10.	"Amor"	Sunny Skylar; Gabriel Ruiz; Ricardo López Méndez	3:07
11.	"I Count the Tears" (with the Drifters)	Felder; Shuman	2:15
12.	"Don't Play That Song (You Lied)"	Ahmet Ertegün; Betty Nelson	2:50
13.	"This Magic Moment" (with the Drifters)	Felder; Shuman	2:29
14.	"Young Boy Blues"	Spector; Felder	2:21
15.	"It's All in the Game"	Charles G. Dawes; Carl Sigman	2:52
16.	"Supernatural Thing, Pt. 1"	Patrick Grant; Gwen Guthrie	4:11
17.	"On the Street Where You Live"	Lerner; Loewe	3:46
18.	"Will You Still Love Me Tomorrow"	Gerry Goffin; Carol Joan Klein	3:11
19.	"Show Me the Way"	Goffin; Klein	2:14
20.	"Here Comes the Night"	Felder; Shuman	2:18
Total length:			56:31

Notes

- Tracks 1, 6, 9 and 14 were recorded on October 27, 1960, in New York.
- Tracks 2 and 11 were recorded on May 19, 1960, in New York.
- Track 3 was recorded on February 11, 1963, in Los Angeles.
- Track 4 was recorded on January 15, 1964, in New York.
- Track 5 was recorded in February 1963 in New York.
- Tracks 7, 15 and 18 were recorded on December 18, 1961, in New York.
- Tracks 8 and 17 were recorded on December 21, 1961, in New York.
- Track 10 was recorded on March 29, 1961, in New York.
- Track 12 was recorded on March 3, 1962, in New York.
- Track 13 was recorded on December 23, 1959, in New York.
- Track 16 was recorded on March 17, 1975, in New York.
- Track 19 was recorded on December 17, 1959, in New York.
- Track 20 was recorded on March 27, 1961, in New York.

== Charts ==
Chart (1987)	Peak position
German Albums (Offizielle Top 100)	35
Swiss Albums (Schweizer Hitparade)	18
UK Albums (OCC)	14
