= The Very Best of Ben E. King =

The Very Best Of Ben E. King

Greatest hits album by Ben E. King
- Released: 1998
- Recorded: 1972–1998
- Genre: Soul
- Length: 41:48
- Label: Rhino Records

Ben E. King chronology
I Have Songs In My Pocket (1998)	The Very Best Of Ben E. King (1998)	Eleven Best (2001)

The Very Best Of Ben E. King is a Ben E. King compilation album covering his entire recording history dating to 1975. Longtime classics such as Spanish Harlem and Don't Play That Song as well as King's most influential hit Stand By Me are all on this album, among 13 additional hits.

== Track listing ==
1. "There Goes My Baby" [2:13]
  (from the album There Goes My Baby with The Drifters)
2. "Dance with Me" [2:23]
  (from the album Dance With Me with The Drifters)
3. "This Magic Moment" [2:29]
  (from the 1963 album Up On the Roof with The Drifters)
4. "Save The Last Dance For Me" [2:34]
  (from the album Save The Last Dance For Me - also sung with The Drifters)
5. "I Count the Tears" [2:07]
  (from the albums Save The Last Dance For Me and Up On the Roof, both with The Drifters)
6. "Spanish Harlem" [2:52]
  (from the album Spanish Harlem)
7. "Stand By Me" [2:53]
  (from the album Don't Play That Song)
8. "On The Horizon" [2:18]
  (from the album Don't Play That Song)
9. "Amor" [2:54]
  (from the album Spanish Harlem)
10. "Young Boy Blues" [2:17]
  (from the album Young Boy Blues)
11. "Here Comes The Night" [2:24]
  (from the album Don't Play That Song)
12. "Don't Play That Song (You Lied)" [2:53]
  (from the album Don't Play That Song)
13. "How Can I Forget" [2:19]
  (from the album Ben E. King's Greatest Hits)
14. "I (Who Have Nothing)" [2:18]
  (from the album Young Boy Blues)
15. "Supernatural Thing, Pt. 1" [3:21]
  (from the album Supernatural)
16. "Do It in the Name of Love" [3:33]
  (from the album Supernatural)
