= Gary Chester =

American studio drummer, author, and teacher

- Born: Cesario Gurciullo; October 27, 1924; The Bronx, New York, United States
- Died: August 17, 1987 (aged 62)
- Genres: Pop, rock
- Occupations: Musician, teacher, writer
- Instrument: Drums

Gary Chester (born Cesario Gurciullo; October 27, 1924 – August 17, 1987) was an American studio drummer, author, and teacher. Beginning in the 1960s, he played on hundreds of records for bands such as the Coasters, the Monkees and the Lovin' Spoonful.

== Biography ==
Born in the Bronx to parents who emigrated from Syracuse, Sicily, Chester's first successful recording session was when he replaced a studio drummer.

As his reputation grew, Chester became a respected teacher, with drummers searching out his expertise and demanding techniques. His drumming systems have been used and endorsed by drummers such as Kenny Aronoff, Gary Gibbons, Roger Post, Douglas Oscard, Danny Gottlieb, Max Weinberg, Chris Adams, Tico Torres, Lindy Morrison, and Dave Weckl, each having studied under Chester.

== Instruction technique ==
=== Ostinato ===
Chester devised a system involving internalized patterns employing a drum 'melody' in an attempt to expand drummers' coordination and groove ability. His use of the ostinato figure employed more than repetition; he created drum melodies for a song with variation and development of the drum phrase or motif using the entire drum kit. He advocated alternating an ostinato line to fit changing harmonies or keys to enhance the song. Chester's system also taught how to set up an ostinato with one limb or more and playing freely with the remaining limbs, allowing one drummer to sound like a small percussion section.

=== Ambidexterity and rhythmic vocalization ===
Chester focused on teaching skills like creativity, improvisation, four-limb independence and ambidexterity, cross-dominance, playing solid time, alignment of limbs, and making an independent contribution to the song while playing to match the song rather than playing to show off. For example, his instructional techniques included learning to overcome students' natural handedness (or laterality) by playing both right-handed and left-handed. This offered the studio pro greater flexibility, smoother groove transition, and a more complex, unbroken riff or fill. This ambidexterity also permitted the drummer to switch the ostinato from right-to-left or vice versa, thereby letting the free hand (or foot) develop a richer drum melody. One additional benefit was more open handed drumming which increases hand mobility around the set as the drummer does not need to cross and uncross his or her arms as often.

The core concept of Chester's New Breed instruction style was five-way independence. The student was given a system (three parts of a rhythm) and was required to play a written melody with the fourth limb. Chester also taught his students to "sing" each part that each limb played (rhythmic vocalization) while drumming to "train your ears to accept and understand what you’re doing." While coordinating and reading, the student would also be required to sing the quarter note, back beat, up beat and the melody for each system. Once the student performed each two page written melody and sang four different parts, he/she was required to play the same exercise with a left hand lead. Here, countless new rhythms were played, read, coordinated in time to a metronome, while singing. As a result of Chester's instructional techniques, the student would: (a) Develop independent four-way coordination; (b) Master sight reading ability and note recognition (c) Left hand would now be able to play ride patterns (d) Control time keeping through metronome and singing (by singing the quarter note, one could always play in time) (e) By gaining the ability to play and sing the melodies written, the student enhanced creativity and musicianship. If one could play what one sang, all playing situations became a breeze.

== Books ==
- New Breed
- New Breed II

== Selected discography ==
Year	Song title	Artist	Date	US charts	R&B charts	British charts	Producer	Miscellaneous
1958	"Charlie Brown"	The Coasters	December 11	2	2	6	Leiber/Stoller	
1958	"16 Candles"	The Crests		2	4			
1958	"A Lover's Question"	Clyde McPhatter		6	1			
1959	"Along Came Jones"	The Coasters	March 26	9	14		Leiber/Stoller	
1959	"Dream Lover"	Bobby Darin	April 6	2	4	1	Ahmet Ertegun, Jerry Wexler	
1959	"Poison Ivy"	The Coasters	July 16	7	1	13	Leiber/Stoller	
1959	"Lavender-Blue"	Sammy Turner	1959	3	14		Leiber/Stoller	
1960	"Save the Last Dance for Me"	The Drifters	May 19	1	1	2	Leiber/Stoller	
1960	"Shoppin' for Clothes"	The Coasters	July 29				Leiber/Stoller	
1960	"Spanish Harlem"	Ben E. King	October 27	10	15		Leiber/Stoller	
1960	"Young Boy Blues"	Ben E. King	October 27					
1960	"Stand By Me"	Ben E. King	October 27	2	1		Leiber/Stoller	
1960	"Saved"	LaVern Baker	December 7	37	17			
1960	"Wild One"	Bobby Rydell		2	10			
1960	"Calendar Girl"	Neil Sedaka		4	22	8		
1961	"Girls! Girls! Girls!"	The Coasters	February 9				Leiber/Stoller	
1961	"Little Egypt"	The Coasters	February 9	23	16		Leiber/Stoller	
1961	"Amor"	Ben E. King	March 29	17	10	38		
1961	"Pretty Little Angel Eyes"	Curtis Lee	May/June	7	8		Phil Spector	backing vocals by The Halos
1961	"Cry to Me"	Solomon Burke	October 6	44	5		Bert Berns	The session also included drummer Panama Francis.
1961	"There's No Other (Like My Baby)"	The Crystals	September or October	20	5		Phil Spector	
1961	"Crying in the Rain"	The Everly Brothers	November 14	6		6	Don Kirshner	
1961	"Please Stay"	The Drifters		14	13			
1961	"Some Kind of Wonderful"	The Drifters		32	6		Leiber/Stoller	
1961	"What Now My Love"	Jane Morgan						
1961	"The Lone Twister"	Murray the K						
1961	"Bless You"	Tony Orlando		15		5		
1961	"Every Breath I Take"	Gene Pitney		42			Phil Spector	
1961	"Happy Birthday Sweet Sixteen"	Neil Sedaka		6		3		
1961	"Will You Love Me Tomorrow"	The Shirelles		1	2		Luther Dixon	
1962	"Don't Play That Song (You Lied)"	Ben E. King	March 3	11	2			
1962	"Twist and Shout"	The Isley Brothers	March	17	2		Bert Russell (a.k.a. Bert Berns)	
1962	"Up On The Roof"	The Drifters	June 28	5	4		Leiber/Stoller	Ranked #114 in Rolling Stone's 500 Greatest Songs of All Time
1962	"Don't Make Me Over"	Dionne Warwick	August				Burt Bacharach, Hal David	initially released as the B side of "I Smiled Yesterday"
1962	"Tell Him"	The Exciters	October 15	4	5	46	Leiber/Stoller	
1962	"Bossa Nova Baby"	Tippie and the Clovers	November				Leiber/Stoller	
1962	"She Cried"	Jay and the Americans		5				
1962	"What Kind of Fool Am I?"	Anthony Newley						from the musical Stop The World - I Want To Get Off
1962	"(The Man Who Shot) Liberty Valance"	Gene Pitney		3				
1962	"I'll Never Dance Again"	Bobby Rydell		14				
1962	"Breaking Up Is Hard to Do"	Neil Sedaka		1	12	7		back up vocals by The Cookies
1962	"Johnny Get Angry"	Joanie Sommers		7		3		
1962	"Hush, Little Baby"	June Valli					Eddie Mathews	Theme from the movie The Miracle Worker
1962	"Mr. Lonely"	Bobby Vinton		1			Robert Morgan	Became a hit in 1964 after being rereleased
1962	"Roses Are Red (My Love)"	Bobby Vinton		1	5	15	Robert Morgan	
1963	"On Broadway"	The Drifters	January 22	9	7			
1963	"Chains"	The Cookies	February 11	7	17	50		
1963	"It’s My Party"	Lesley Gore	March 30	1	1	9	Quincy Jones	
1963	"Anyone Who Had a Heart"	Dionne Warwick	November		6		Burt Bacharach, Hal David	"the song shuttled between 5/4 and 4/4" with "a bar of 7/4 for good measure"
1963	"My Boyfriend's Back"	The Angels			2		Bob Feldman, Jerry Goldstein, Richard Gottehrer	
1963	"He's So Fine"	The Chiffons		1	1	16	Phil Margo, Mitch Margo, Jay Siegal, Hank Medress	
1963	"Mr. Bass Man"	Johnny Cymbal		16		24	Alan Lorber	The bass part was sung by Ronnie Bright, who sang with The Cadillacs, The Valentines and The Coasters
1963	"Our Day Will Come"	Ruby and the Romantics			1		Allen Stanton	
1963	"Hey Girl"	Freddie Scott		10	10			
1963	"Blue on Blue"	Bobby Vinton		3			Robert Morgan	
1964	"Walk On By"	Dionne Warwick	April		1		Bacharach, David	Ranked #70 in Rolling Stone's 500 Greatest Songs of All Time
1964	"Under the Boardwalk"	The Drifters	May 21,	4	1	45	Bert Berns	
1964	"Come a Little Bit Closer"	Jay and the Americans		4			Artie Ripp	
1964	"Goin' Out of My Head"	Little Anthony and the Imperials		6	8			
1964	"It Hurts to Be in Love"	Gene Pitney		4			Aaron Schroeder, Wally Gold	
1964	"Remember (Walking in the Sand)"	The Shangri-Las		5	9		George "Shadow" Morton	
1965	"Baby I'm Yours"	Barbara Lewis	January 8	11	5		Bert Berns, Ollie McLaughlin	
1965	"What the World Needs Now Is Love"	Jackie DeShannon	March 23	7	40			
1965	"Cara Mia"	Jay and the Americans		4			Artie Ripp	
1965	"Do You Believe in Magic"	The Lovin' Spoonful		9			Erik Jacobsen	
1966	"Over the Rainbow"	Patti LaBelle and the Bluebelles						
1966	"What the World Needs Now Is Love"	Dionne Warwick					Burt Bacharach	From the album Here Where There Is Love
1967	"Brown Eyed Girl"	Van Morrison	28 March	10			Bert Berns	ranked No. 110 on the Rolling Stone; 500 Greatest Songs of All Time
1967	"I Say a Little Prayer"	Dionne Warwick	October		8		Bacharach, David	
1968	"Do You Know the Way to San Jose"	Dionne Warwick	April	9	23		Bacharach, David	
1969	"I'll Never Fall in Love Again"	Dionne Warwick	December	5	17		Bacharach, David	
1969	"Sugar, Sugar"	The Archies		1			Jeff Barry	
1969	"Theme from Midnight Cowboy"	Ferrante & Teicher		10				
1969	"And Now We Come To Distances"	Gloria Loring					Al Gorgoni	
1972	"Rocky Mountain High"	John Denver	August	9			Milt Okun	
1972	"You Don't Mess Around with Jim"	Jim Croce					Terry Cashman, Tommy West	
1972	"Time in a Bottle"	Jim Croce		1			Cashman, West	Recorded in 1972, the song was a hit a year later following Croce's death
1972	"Daddy Don't You Walk So Fast"	Wayne Newton		4			Wes Farrell	
1973	"Bad, Bad Leroy Brown"	Jim Croce		1			Cashman, West	

== Selected album recordings ==
- Spanish Harlem - Ben E. King (Atco Records, 1961)
- Solomon Burke - Solomon Burke (Apollo Records, 1962)
- The Electrifying Aretha Franklin - Aretha Franklin (Columbia Records, 1962)
- 'Round Midnight - Betty Carter (Atco Records, 1963)
- If You Need Me - Solomon Burke (Atlantic Records, 1963)
- Young Boy Blues - Ben E. King (Atco Records, 1964)
- Unforgettable: A Tribute to Dinah Washington - Aretha Franklin (Columbia Records, 1964)
- Baby, I'm Yours - Barbara Lewis (Atlantic Records, 1965)
- Chad & Jeremy Sing for You - Chad & Jeremy (World Artists Records, 1965)
- Esther Phillips Sings - Esther Phillips (Atlantic Records, 1966)
- It's Magic - Barbara Lewis (Atlantic Records, 1966)
- The World We Knew - Frank Sinatra (Reprise Records, 1967)
- Workin' on a Groovy Thing - Barbara Lewis (Atlantic Records, 1968)
- New York Tendaberry - Laura Nyro (Columbia Records, 1969)
- And Now We Come to Distances - Gloria Loring (Evolution, 1969)
- Changes - The Monkees (Colgems Records, 1970)
- Aerie - John Denver (RCA Victor, 1971)
- Jukin' - The Manhattan Transfer (Capitol Records, 1971)
- Poems, Prayers & Promises - John Denver (RCA Victor, 1971)
- You Don't Mess Around with Jim - Jim Croce (ABC Records, 1972)
- Rocky Mountain High - John Denver (RCA Victor, 1972)
- Life and Times - Jim Croce (ABC Records, 1973)
- Farewell Andromeda - John Denver (RCA Victor, 1973)
- I Got a Name - Jim Croce (ABC Records, 1973)
