= Ben E. King's Greatest Hits =

Greatest hits album by Ben E. King
- Released: November 23, 1964
- Recorded: 1961–1963
- Genre: Soul
- Length: 31:49
- Label: Atco ATCO 33-165 (MONO - released in 1964); ATCO SD 33-165 (STEREO - released in 1966)
- Producer: Ahmet Ertegun; Jerry Wexler

Ben E. King chronology
Young Boy Blues (1964)	Ben E. King's Greatest Hits (1964)	Seven Letters (1965)

Ben E. King's Greatest Hits is the fifth album and first compilation album by Ben E. King. Many classic hits such as "Stand By Me", "Spanish Harlem", "I (Who Have Nothing)", and others return on this compilation disc released in 1964.

Many discographies do not note this work; however, Marv Goldberg's R&B Notebook References the album as being released before "Seven Letters". A stereo version of this disc was re-issued in 1966. Some of the songs, most notably, "Don't Play That Song (You Lied)," were released in alternate versions without explanation.

== Track listing ==
1. "That's When It Hurts" [3:08]
  (1964 single)
2. "Auf Wiedersehen, My Dear" [2:06]
  (B-side of Tell Daddy [1962])
3. "Around the Corner" [2:51]
  (B-side of That's When It Hurts [1964])
4. "Young Boy Blues" [2:24]
  (from the album Don't Play That Song)
5. "What Now My Love" [2:34]
  (1964 single)
6. "Stand By Me" [2:44]
  (from the album Don't Play That Song)
7. "Amor" [3:05]
  (from the album Spanish Harlem)
8. "Don't Play That Song (You Lied)" [2:38]
  (from the album Don't Play That Song. The 1966 re-issue of this album has an alternate version of this song.)
9. "I (Who Have Nothing)" [2:30]
  (from the album Young Boy Blues)
10. "How Can I Forget" [2:20]
  (1963 single)
11. "I Could Have Danced All Night" [2:35]
  (1963 single)
12. "Spanish Harlem" [2:54]
  (from the album Spanish Harlem)
