= George Barnes (musician) =

American jazz guitarist (1921–1977)

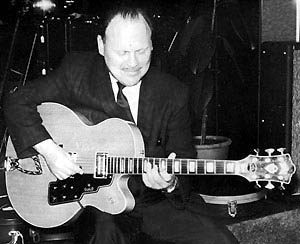

Background information
- Born: George Warren Barnes; July 17, 1921; South Chicago Heights, Illinois, U.S.
- Died: September 5, 1977 (aged 56) Concord, California
- Genres: Jazz; blues; swing; pop; rock; R&B; Country
- Occupations: Musician; arranger; composer; producer; author; music educator
- Instrument: Guitar
- Years active: 1931–1977
- Labels: Okeh; Keynote; Decca; Grand Award; Colortone; ABC-Paramount; Pleasure; Mercury; Music Minus One; United Artists; Carney; Columbia; A&R; Famous Door; Chiaroscuro; Improv; RCA; Concord Jazz
- Website: georgebarneslegacy.com

George Warren Barnes (July 17, 1921– September 5, 1977) was an American jazz guitarist. He was also a conductor, composer, arranger, producer, author, and educator. He was hired by the NBC Orchestra at the age of 17, making him the youngest musician on staff. At 17, he was considered to be a great player by many musicians, including Tommy Dorsey, and Jimmy McPartland. Barnes was also proficient as a recording engineer. During his career, Barnes recorded with singers Mel Tormé, Ella Fitzgerald, Frank Sinatra, Bing Crosby, Patti Page, Dinah Washington, Lena Horne, Billy Eckstine and Johnny Mathis among many others. He was an inspiration to, and influenced guitarists Chet Atkins, Roy Clark, Herb Ellis and Merle Travis, among many others.

== Biography ==
Barnes was born in South Chicago Heights, United States. George had first started to play the piano at the age of five. When George was ten, the family were forced to sell the instrument along with the home because of the great depression. There was an old Sears Roebuck Silvertone guitar left over, which George picked up and his father who was a guitarist began to teach him to play. In 1931, Barnes's older brother made a pickup and amplifier for him because he knew that George wanted to play solo lines that could be heard in a band. He believed he might have been the first person to ever play an electric guitar.

When George was eleven, he heard some records with Bix Beiderbecke that featured Joe Venuti and knew then that he wanted to be a jazz musician.

He had become accomplished enough on guitar to join the local musicians' union at the age of twelve, and helped to aid the family's income by playing at local dances and weddings.

When Barnes was young he was given blues guitar lessons by the guitarist Lonnie Johnson. Johnson tuned his 12-string guitar down a whole-tone to make it easier for George to play. Lonnie Johnson influenced the way that Barnes played the blues. George Barnes wanted to play melody and not rhythm, but during his early years of playing because so few soloed, other than Johnson no guitarist influenced the way he played. He listened to records of Django Reinhardt but could not relate to his playing. So players of other instruments were also primary inspirations to him, particularly the clarinetist Jimmie Noone, whom George Barnes played with at the age of 16 and claimed was his single greatest influence. Barnes was also inspired and influenced strongly by the playing of the cornetist Bix Beiderbecke. He wanted to capture the same feeling on guitar that Beiderbecke did through his own playing. Other influences were Louis Armstrong, and saxophonist Johnny Hodges.

From 1935 to 1937, Barnes led a band that performed in the Midwest.

In 1937 he played in an eight piece band called the Rhythm-Aires. Barnes did all of the arranging and orchestration for this band. Because most of the players switched from one instrument to another, he had to often double the orchestration. They toured at night around Chicago Heights.

He was spotted by Johnny Mince of the Tommy Dorsey Orchestra in 1937. Mince set up an appearance for Barnes on Dorsey's Amateur Hour after driving past his house in his car and hearing him play. George won the $75 first prize along with an appointment to play at the Chicago Theatre for a week.

On March 1, 1938, Barnes played electric guitar on the recorded songs "Sweetheart Land" and "It's a Lowdown Dirty Shame" with blues guitarist Big Bill Broonzy. In 1938, when he was seventeen, Barnes was hired as staff guitarist for the NBC Orchestra. He was also staff guitarist and arranger for Decca and recorded with Blind John Davis, Jazz Gillum, Merline Johnson, Curtis Jones, and Washboard Sam. Because he only knew Barnes as a sideman to these artists, Hugues Panassié in Le Jazz Hot mistakenly referred to Barnes at around this time as "the great Negro blues guitar player from Chicago."

From January 1939, while still only seventeen, Barnes began playing at the Three Deuces nightclub in Chicago. He became a featured performer there. He would sit on a chair in front of the band and improvise for as long as he possibly could on different jazz tunes. He became a sensation and the audience would ask for many encores.

On 17 February 1940, Barnes released his first solo recording, "I'm Forever Blowing Bubbles" and "I Can't Believe That You're in Love with Me" on Okeh Records. He was drafted in 1942 and served with the U.S. Army as an intercept operator in the Pentagon. After his discharge in 1946, he formed the George Barnes Octet and was given a fifteen-minute radio program on the ABC network. On January 17, 1947, he married Evelyn Lorraine Triplett in Chicago.

In 1951, Barnes was signed to Decca by Milt Gabler, and moved from Chicago to New York City. In 1953, he joined the orchestra for the television show Your Hit Parade. The band was conducted by Raymond Scott, and Barnes was a featured soloist. Barnes, Scott, and vocalist Dorothy Collins (Scott's wife) also recorded together.

Barnes worked often as a studio musician in New York City, playing on hundreds of albums and jingles from the early 1950s through the late 1960s. He played guitar on Patsy Cline's New York sessions in April 1957. Although he was primarily a swing jazz guitarist, he participated in hundreds of pop, rock, country, and R&B recording sessions. He played on many hit songs by the Coasters, on "This Magic Moment" by the Drifters, and on "Lonely Teardrops". His electric guitar can be heard in the movie A Face in the Crowd.

Barnes recorded three albums for Mercury: Movin' Easy (1961) with his Jazz Renaissance Quintet, Guitar Galaxies (1960), and Guitars Galore (1961). The latter two contained his orchestrations for ten guitars, known as his guitar choir, which used guitars in place of a horn section. The two albums employed a recording technique known as Perfect Presence Sound.

Between 1953 and 1961 he was featured on many recordings with The Three Suns.

Barnes received the most attention as a jazz guitarist when he recorded as a duo with Carl Kress from 1961 to 1965. He and Kress were invited to play at the White House Christmas party on December 17, 1964. For the occasion, Barnes wrote "Watusi for Luci" for First Daughter Luci Baines Johnson because she was known for dancing the Watusi in clubs with Hollywood celebrities. The song was used as the theme for The Clay Cole Show in 1965 when the TV show was renamed Clay Cole's Discotek.

Barnes formed a duo with jazz guitarist Bucky Pizzarelli that lasted from 1969 to 1972. In 1973, he and cornetist Ruby Braff formed the Ruby Braff–George Barnes Quartet. The quartet recorded several albums, including Live at the New School (Chiaroscuro, 1974), To Fred Astaire with Love (RCA, 1975), and with singer Tony Bennett, Tony Bennett Sings 10 Rodgers & Hart Songs (Improv, 1976). From 1973 until 1977, Barnes recorded several well-received solo albums for Concord Jazz and with the quartet he had formed with Braff. He also recorded two albums with jazz violinist Joe Venuti for the label.

Barnes and his wife, Evelyn, left New York City after his last European tour in 1975 to live and work in the San Francisco Bay area. He died of a heart attack in Concord, California, in 1977 at the age of 56. He was survived by his wife, and their daughter, Alexandra.

== Style and technique ==
Barnes's style took shape before the development of bebop, and he remained a swing stylist throughout his career. His lines were usually short, melodic, bluesy and "inside" (i.e., diatonic), compared to the chromaticism and long lines of bop-era guitarists. His improvisations often employed call and response phrases, and his tone was clearer, cleaner and brighter than many other jazz guitarists (such as Joe Pass or Jim Hall) and reflected his "happy" approach to music. His playing was noted for its bright quality and melodic style.

The single note lines in his solos never strayed far from the tune that was being played. He often made use of blues phrases, string bends and vibrato. His use of vibrato was developed from watching violinists and would start slowly, then the speed increased. When creating vibrato he did it across the fingerboard, rather than in line with it.

He played a right-handed guitar, but George Barnes was left handed, seeing it as an advantage to use the strongest hand for work on the fretboard.

Claiming that it gave him more control, Barnes held the pick between his thumb and middle finger playing mainly with downstrokes. He only used alternate picking when picking very rapid notes on the fretboard. By tightening or loosening his grip on the pick, Barnes could change the volume and dynamics of his guitar sound. Believing that it helped to give him good tone, he always used the thickest picks, and the heaviest gauge strings possible.

Not long before his death, Barnes recorded three live albums—two produced from an April 17, 1977, concert at the San Francisco club Bimbo's 365, the other at the Willows Theatre in Concord, California. The albums are good examples of his swinging, happy and often mischievous style. The albums also include his banter with the audience and his introductions of tunes and his band, giving the listener a glimpse of his sense of humour.

In a review of the album Don't Get Around Much Anymore (material from a 1977 concert in Concord, California, recorded a little more than a month before Barnes's death at the age of 56), Jim Ferguson wrote, "Often overlooked in a sea of more modern-sounding, bebop-oriented guitarists, George Barnes could swing like mad and spin out intricate, frequently bluesy phrases with awesome precision and musicality...From start to finish, this well-recorded performance demonstrates the qualities that qualify Barnes for a position among the most elite players in the annals of jazz guitar."

In 1942, Barnes wrote the first electric guitar method book, The George Barnes Electric Guitar Method, published by Wm. J. Smith. In 1961, he wrote and recorded George Barnes' Living Guitar Method: The Easy Way to Learn All the Chords and Rhythms and Ten Duets for Two Guitars (recorded with his partner Carl Kress) for Music Minus One. In 1965, he wrote How to Arrange for Solo Guitar, published by Peermusic. He also produced the first guitar course offered on cassette tape, The Great George Barnes Guitar Course, published in 1970 by Prentice Hall.

== Discography ==
=== As leader ===
- The George Barnes Sextet (Keynote, 1946)
- Country Jazz (Colortone, 1957)
- Guitar in Velvet (Grand Award, 1957)
- Guitars...By George! (Decca, 1958)
- Guitar Galaxies (Mercury, 1960)
- Guitars Galore (Mercury, 1961)
- Something Tender with Bud Freeman and Carl Kress (United Artists Jazz, 1962)
- Guitars, Anyone? Why Not Start at the Top? with Carl Kress (Carney, 1963)
- Smokey and Intimate with Carl Kress and Flo Handy (Carney, 1964)
- Town Hall Concert with Carl Kress (United Artists, 1963)
- Guitars Pure and Honest with Bucky Pizzarelli (A&R, 1971)
- The Guitar Album: The Historic Town Hall Concert with Bucky Pizzarelli (Columbia, 1972)
- Swing, Guitars with Dick Hyman (Famous Door, 1973)
- Live at the New School with Ruby Braff, Michael Moore, Wayne Wright (Chiaroscuro, 1974)
- Gems with Joe Venuti (Concord Jazz, 1975)
- Braff/Barnes Quartet Salutes Rodgers and Hart with Ruby Braff (Concord Jazz, 1975)
- Live at the Concord Summer Festival with Joe Venuti (Concord Jazz, 1977)
- The Uncollected George Barnes and His Octet 1946 (Hindsight, 1977)
- Blues Going Up (Concord Jazz, 1977)
- Plays So Good (Concord Jazz, 1978)
- Two Guitars Volume 1 with Carl Kress (Stash, 1983)
- Two Guitars and a Horn with Carl Kress and Bud Freeman (Stash, 1983)
- Don't Get Around Much Anymore (Acoustic Disc, 2002)

With Louis Armstrong

- Louis and the Angels (Decca, 1957)
- Satchmo: A Musical Autobiography of Louis Armstrong (Decca, 1957)
- Louis and the Good Book (Decca, 1958)
- I Love Jazz (Decca, 1962)

With Al Caiola

- High Strung (RCA Victor, 1959)
- Italian Guitars (Time, 1960)
- Spanish Guitars (Time, 1976)

With Ben E. King

- Spanish Harlem (Atco, 1961)
- Don't Play That Song! (Atco, 1962)
- Young Boy Blues (Atco, 1964)

With others

- Steve Allen, Jazz for Tonight (Coral, 1955)
- Tony Bennett, Tony Bennett Sings 10 Rodgers & Hart Songs (Improv, 1976)
- Tony Bennett, Tony Bennett Sings More Great Rodgers & Hart (Improv, 1977)
- Solomon Burke, If You Need Me (Atlantic, 1963)
- Solomon Burke, King Solomon (Atlantic, 1968)
- Russ Case, Dances Wild (Vik, 1957)
- The Coasters, Young Blood (Atlantic, 1982)
- Hans Conried, Peter Meets the Wolf in Dixieland (Strand, 1959)
- Sam Cooke, Swing Low (RCA Victor, 1961)
- Jackie Cooper, The Movies Swing (Dot, 1958)
- Bob Dylan, The Freewheelin' Bob Dylan (Columbia, 1963)
- Bud Freeman, Something Tender (United Artists, 1962)
- Ronnie Gilbert, In Hi Fi The Legend of Bessie Smith (RCA Victor, 1958)
- Johnny Guarnieri, The Duke Again (Coral, 1957)
- Dick Hyman & Mary Mayo, Moon Gas (MGM, 1963)
- Little Willie John, Talk to Me (King, 1958)
- Betty Madigan, The Jerome Kern Songbook (Coral, 1958)
- Wingy Manone, Trumpet on the Wing (Decca, 1958)
- Carmen McRae, Mad About the Man/Carmen McRae Sings Noel Coward (Decca, 1958)
- Lou McGarity, Blue Lou (Argo, 1960)
- Jimmy McPartland, That Happy Dixieland Jazz (RCA Camden, 1960)
- Sy Oliver, Easy Walker (Sesasc, 1962)
- Glenn Osser, Be There at 5 (Mercury, 1956)
- Don Redman, Don Redman All Stars (Sesac, 1960)
- Buddy Rich & Gene Krupa, Burnin' Beat (Verve, 1962)
- Ernie Royal, Accent on Trumpet (Urania, 1956)
- Charlie Shavers, Excitement Unlimited (Capitol, 1963)
- George Siravo, Rodgers & Hart Percussion & Strings (Time, 1960)
- Tommy Reynolds, Jazz for Happy Feet (King, 1956)
- Jimmy Scott, Little Jimmy Scott (Savoy, 1984)
- Lou Stein, Honky Tonk Piano Featuring Lou Stein (Mercury, 1956)
- Lou Stein, Saloon Favorites (Mercury, 1957)
- Roy Smeck, The Magic Ukulele of Roy Smeck (ABC Paramount, 1959)
- Cootie Williams, Cootie Williams in Hi Fi (RCA Victor, 1958)
- Joe Venuti, Joe Venuti and the Blue Five (From the Jazz Vault, 1979)
