= Person to Person: Live at the Blue Note =

Live album by Ben E. King
- Released: November 4, 2003
- Genre: Soul
- Length: 54:33
- Label: Half Note Records

Ben E. King chronology
Eleven Best (2001)	Person to Person: Live at the Blue Note (2003)	Soul Masters (2005)

Person to Person: Live at the Blue Note is a Ben E. King live album. It was recorded live at the Blue Note Jazz Club in New York City. The album was released on Half Note Records in 2003.

== Track listing ==
1. "Short Stomp" [6:06]
2. "Harlem Nocturne" [4:39]
3. "Let the Good Times Roll" [4:47]
4. "Young Boy Blues" [5:18]
5. "Person to Person" [5:37]
6. "Little Mama" [4:04]
7. "Under the Boardwalk" [4:55]
8. "Spanish Harlem" [3:50]
9. "Stand by Me" [3:54]
10. "Hallelujah I Love Her So" [5:49]
11. "There'll Be Some Changes Made" [5:34]

== Credits ==
- John Abbott - Cover Portrait
- Steven Bensusan - Executive Producer
- Andy Bigan - Assistant
- Carlton Cabey - Photography
- Steve Count - Band, Bass, Bass (Acoustic)
- Rina Davidovich - Cover Art
- Alan Ferber - Band, Trombone
- Lou Gimenez - Mixing Assistant, Sound Editing
- Guido Gonzalez - Band, Flugelhorn, Trumpet
- Lee Greene - Band, Flute, Sax (Tenor)
- Ben E. King - Composer, Executive Producer, Mixing, Primary Artist, Vocals
- Jack Kreisberg - Mixing, Producer
- Rick Kriska - Band, Flute, Sax (Baritone)
- Jeff Levenson - Executive in Charge of Music
- Wade Marcus - Arranger
- Rich Mercurio - Band, Drums
- Jack O'Hara - Announcer
- Al Orlo - Band, Guitar
- Tim Ouimette - Arranger, Band, Composer, Conductor, Flugelhorn, Mixing, Trumpet
- Judy Palma - Band, Piano
- Bob Porter - Liner Notes
- Steven Remote - Coordinater, Recording Engineer, Mixing Engineer
- Tom Walsh - Mastering
- Dan Wilensky - Band, Flute, Sax (Alto)
