= Don't Play That Song =

Don't Play That Song may refer to:

- Don't Play That Song, an album by Aretha Franklin
- Don't Play That Song!, an album by Ben E. King, or the title track
- "Don't Play That Song (You Lied)", a Ben E. King song also covered by Aretha Franklin

== See also ==
- "Don't Play That Song Again", 2000 UK entry to the Eurovision Song Contest
- Play That Song (disambiguation)
