= Seven Letters =

Seven Letters may refer to:

- "Seven Letters" (song), a 1964 song by Ben E. King
- Seven Letters (Ben E. King album), a 1965 album by Ben E. King
- Seven Letters (Tonus Peregrinus album), a 2005 album by Tonus Peregrinus of music by Antony Pitts
- Letters to the seven churches in the Book of Revelation
- 7 Letters, 2015 Singaporean anthology film
