= 4 the Cause =

American musical group

- Origin: Oak Park, Illinois, U.S.
- Genres: R&B, pop
- Years active: 1993–2000, 2008
- Label: RCA Records/BMG Records
- Members: Shonna "Miss Lady" Edwards (b. May 10, 1981, in Chicago) Bennie "BJ" Edwards Jr. (b. August 13, 1982, in Chicago); Jason "J-Man" Edwards (b. July 2, 1982, in Chicago) Reshonda "Shorty" Edwards (b. September 26, 1984, in Chicago)
- Website: www.myspace.com/four4thecause

4 the Cause were an R&B group from Oak Park, Illinois, United States, who were later based in Germany. The band consisted of the family members Shonna Edwards, Bennie Edwards, Reshonda Landfair and Jason Edwards.

== Background ==
Founded in March 1993 under the name Young Warriors 4 the Cause, it took winning the Apollo Style talent contest at school in 1995 to land their first recording contract. In 1997, while under the management of Bell Miles and Robert Williams (management team for the Moffatts), the band decided to shorten their name to 4 the Cause.

== Breakthrough ==
The group gained success in 1998 with their cover of Ben E. King's hit song "Stand by Me", which was particularly successful in Europe, reaching the top 10 in eight countries. Later that year, their debut album of the same name, Stand by Me was released. The group also had a minor hit with a cover of the Bill Withers song, "Ain't No Sunshine". They released two more singles before disbanding in 2000.

== Discography ==
=== Albums ===
Title	Album details	Peak chart positions		
Title	Album details	GER	AUT	SWI
Stand by Me	Released: 1998; Label: RCA Records/BMG Records	51	29	20

=== Singles ===
Year	Single	Peak chart positions												Album
Year	Single	GER	AUS	AUT	BEL	FRA	IRE	NED	NZ	SWE	SWI	UK	US	Album
1998	"Stand by Me"	2	28	2	6	14	2	6	3	6	1	12	82	Stand by Me
1998	"Let Me Be"	82	—	—	—	—	—	—	—	—	—	—		Stand by Me
1998	"Ain't No Sunshine"	52	73	27	—	64	—	20	—	28	—	—		Stand by Me
1999	"Everytime You Go Away"	—	—	—	—	—	—	—	—	—	—	—	—	Stand by Me
2000	"E-Mail"	—	—	—	—	—	—	—	—	—	—	—	—	Stand by Me
