= We're Gonna Groove =

"Groovin'"

Single by Ben E. King
- A-side: "What Now My Love"
- Released: January 28, 1964
- Recorded: 1963
- Genre: Rhythm and blues; soul
- Length: 2:05
- Label: Atco
- Songwriters: Ben E. King, James Bethea

Ben E. King singles chronology
| "I Could Have Danced All Night" (1963) | "Groovin'" (1964) | "That's When It Hurts" (1964) |

"We're Gonna Groove" (or "Groovin'" as it was originally titled) is a song written by the soul singer Ben E. King and later co-credited to James Bethea. In 1964, it was released as the B-side to King's rendition of "What Now My Love".

Although the single did not reach the record charts, critic Richie Unterberger felt that the song was one of King's best self-penned efforts. He compared the arrangement to James Brown's early 1960s work and added "King is mostly known for ballads and romantic numbers, but 'Groovin'' convincingly demonstrates that he could also write and sing bluesy, swinging uptempo soul numbers." "Groovin'" is included on King's 1993 Anthology compilation.

Manfred Mann recorded the song as the title track for their 1964 EP Groovin' with Manfred Mann. According to Unterberger, "Manfred Mann's cover was longer and looser than the original, with some storming barrelhouse piano by Mann, long instrumental breaks that also included guitar and vibes solos, and a raucous vocal by Paul Jones." The EP reached number three on the UK charts.

== Led Zeppelin version ==
Led Zeppelin performed "We're Gonna Groove" as the opening number during their 1970 UK and European tours. The song was proposed for Led Zeppelin II, but did not appear until the 1982 release of Coda. Jimmy Page finished the recording at his Sol Studios, after the group disbanded following the death of drummer John Bonham.

In a contemporary review of Coda for Rolling Stone, Kurt Loder described "We're Gonna Groove" as "definitive 1969 raunch." He added "the essential elements of Zeppelin's sound are already firmly in place: Page's propulsive guitar playing, Robert Plant's pealing vocal, John Paul Jones' duty-bound bass, and the late John Bonham's creature with-the-atom-brain drumming."
