= Aretha's Greatest Hits =

1971 greatest hits album by Aretha Franklin

Greatest hits album by Aretha Franklin
- Released: September 9, 1971
- Recorded: 1967–1971
- Genre: Soul; R&B; pop
- Label: Atlantic
- Producer: Jerry Wexler; Tom Dowd; Arif Mardin

Aretha Franklin chronology
| Aretha Live at Fillmore West (1971) | Aretha's Greatest Hits (1971) | Young, Gifted and Black (1972) |

Singles from Aretha's Greatest Hits
- 1. "Bridge Over Troubled Water" Released: March 19, 1971; 2. "Spanish Harlem" Released: July 1971; 3. "You're All I Need to Get By" Released: September 20, 1971

Professional ratings
Review scores
| Source | Rating |
|---|---|
| AllMusic | 3/5 stars |
| Christgau's Record Guide | B+ |
| The Rolling Stone Record Guide | 5/5 stars |

Aretha's Greatest Hits is the third compilation album by American singer Aretha Franklin. Released on September 9, 1971, on Atlantic Records, the compilation contains three new recordings: "Spanish Harlem", "You're All I Need to Get By" and "Bridge Over Troubled Water".

== Track listing ==
=== Side 1 ===
1. "Spanish Harlem" (Jerry Leiber, Phil Spector) – 3:30
2. "Chain of Fools" (Don Covay) – 2:45
3. "Don't Play That Song (You Lied)" (Ahmet Ertegun, Betty Nelson) – 2:48
4. "I Say a Little Prayer" (Burt Bacharach, Hal David) – 3:30
5. "Dr. Feelgood" (Aretha Franklin, Ted White) – 3:18
6. "Let It Be" (John Lennon, Paul McCartney) – 3:28
7. "Do Right Woman – Do Right Man" (Dan Penn, Chips Moman) – 3:15

=== Side 2 ===
1. "Bridge over Troubled Water" (Paul Simon) – 5:31
2. "Respect" (Otis Redding) – 2:26
3. "Baby I Love You" (Ronnie Shannon) – 2:39
4. "(You Make Me Feel Like) A Natural Woman" (Gerry Goffin, Jerry Wexler, Carole King) – 2:39
5. "I Never Loved a Man (The Way I Love You)" (Ronnie Shannon) – 2:47
6. "You're All I Need to Get By" (Nickolas Ashford, Valerie Simpson) – 3:34
7. "Call Me" (Aretha Franklin) – 3:18

== Credits ==
- Aretha Franklin – piano, vocals
- Ron Albert -recording engineer

== Charts ==
| Chart (1971) | Peak position |
|---|---|
| Hungarian Albums (MAHASZ) | 40 |
| US Billboard 200 | 19 |
| US Top R&B/Hip-Hop Albums (Billboard) | 3 |
