= Acércate Más (Come Closer to Me) =

"Come Closer to Me"
- 1976 Belgian re-release

Single by Nat King Cole

from the album Cole Español
- Released: 1958
- Label: Capitol
- Songwriters: Osvaldo Farrés, Al Stewart

"Come Closer to Me"

Single by Ben E. King

from the album Spanish Harlem
- Released: 1961
- Songwriters: Osvaldo Farrés, Al Stewart

"Acércate Más" is a 1946 hit song by Osvaldo Farrés.

The song was translated into English as "Come Closer to Me," in the film Easy to Wed by Carlos Ramírez.

The song was covered by Nat King Cole in 1958, in both English and Spanish. This version peaked at number 38 on the Billboard Hot 100. In 2013, a posthumous duet was created with his daughter Natalie Cole.
