= Eleven Best =

Greatest hits album by Ben E. King
- Released: January 9, 2001
- Genre: Soul
- Length: 38:47
- Label: Cleopatra Records

Ben E. King chronology
The Very Best Of Ben E. King (1998)	Eleven Best (2001)	Person To Person: Live at the Blue Note (2003)

Eleven Best is a Ben E. King compilation album. This set was released by Cleopatra Records, which has not released any of King's albums to date.

This collection includes a special Drifters Medley, which combines several songs from King's days with the Drifters. Stand By Me, a staple on any King compilation, is also included. Many other classics have also been added to the track list such as Spanish Harlem and two versions of Don't Play That Song, one an extended version.

== Track listing ==
1. "Amor" [2:58]
2. "Spanish Harlem" [3:07]
3. "Don't Play That Song (You Lied)" [3:00]
4. "Seven Letters" [3:15]
5. "Stand by Me" [3:15]
6. "I (Who Have Nothing)" [2:28]
7. "Drifters Medley" [5:18]
8. "I Had a Love" [3:37]
9. "Supernatural Thing, Pt. 1" [4:30]
10. "Don't Play That Song (You Lied)" (Extended Version) [4:02]
11. "Do It In The Name Of Love" [3:17]
