= So Much Love (Ben E. King song) =

"So Much Love" is a song written by Gerry Goffin and Carole King. It was first recorded by Ben E King in 1966. In 1967 it was recorded by the Hour Glass and in 1968 by Dusty Springfield.

As a R&B/Soul/Pop song it was also recorded by Blood, Sweat & Tears, Eric Burdon, Darlene Love, David Garrick, Steve Alaimo, Maurice & Mac, Percy Sledge, Tony Blackburn and others.

In 2000 George Nooks performed it in a reggae version.
