= Ben E. King Sings for Soulful Lovers =

Studio album by Ben E. King
- Released: 1962
- Genre: Soul
- Length: 35:41
- Label: Atco
- Producer: Ahmet Ertegün

Ben E. King chronology
| Spanish Harlem (1961) | Ben E. King Sings for Soulful Lovers (1962) | Don't Play That Song! (1962) |

Professional ratings
Review scores
| Source | Rating |
|---|---|
| AllMusic | 3/5 stars |
| The Encyclopedia of Popular Music | 3/5 stars |

Ben E. King Sings for Soulful Lovers is the second studio album by Ben E. King, released by Atlantic Records in 1962.

== Track listing ==
1. "My Heart Cries for You" (Percy Faith, Carl Sigman) – 2:21
2. "He Will Break Your Heart" (Jerry Butler, Curtis Mayfield, Calvin Carter) – 3:34
3. "Dream Lover" (Bobby Darin) – 2:38
4. "Will You Still Love Me Tomorrow" (Carole King, Gerry Goffin) – 3:11
5. "My Foolish Heart" (Ned Washington, Victor Young) – 2:38
6. "Fever" (John Davenport, Eddie Cooley) – 2:57
7. "Moon River" (Henry Mancini, Johnny Mercer) – 2:52
8. "What a Difference a Day Made" (María Grever, Stanley Adams) – 2:43
9. "Because of You" (Arthur Hammerstein) – 2:56
10. "At Last" (Mack Gordon, Harry Warren) – 3:13
11. "On the Street Where You Live" (Alan Jay Lerner, Frederick Loewe) – 3:46
12. "It's All in the Game" (Carl Sigman, Charles G. Dawes) – 2:52

== Personnel ==
- Claus Ogerman – arrangements, conductor

Technical

- Phil Iehle, Tom Dowd – engineer
- Loring Eutemey – cover design
- Maurice Seymour – cover photography
