= I Have Songs in My Pocket =

Studio album by Ben E. King
- Released: 1998
- Genre: Children's music
- Length: 31:20
- Label: New Hope Records

Ben E. King chronology
Shades of Blue (1993)	I Have Songs in My Pocket (1998)	The Very Best of Ben E. King (1998)

I Have Songs in My Pocket is the 19th album by Ben E. King, was released in 1998. This album contains young children's songs, written and produced by children's music man, Bobby Susser, known for his young children's series, "Bobby Susser Songs for Children". It was the first team effort between Ben E. King and Susser, and it won the Early Childhood News' Directors' Choice Award and Dr. Toy's / The Institute for Childhood Resources Award.

== Track listing ==
All tracks written by Bobby Susser.

1. "I Have Songs in My Pocket" – 3:47
2. "Dee Dah Day" – 2:28
3. "Music Is Like Magic" – 3:07
4. "Bip Bam Boom" – 2:10
5. "Sing a Song Each Day" – 2:35
6. "There Are Colors All Around" – 2:51
7. "Fill the World with Songs" – 3:26
8. "Just Do It" – 2:34
9. "A Very Special Day" – 3:03
10. "Hello Hello Goodbye Goodbye" – 2:31
11. "Sleepy Head" – 2:48
