= Shades of Blue (Ben E. King album) =

Studio album by Ben E. King
- Released: August 10, 1999
- Genre: Soul
- Length: 51:38
- Label: Halfnote Records

Ben E. King chronology
Anthology (1993)	Shades of Blue (1999)	I Have Songs in My Pocket (1998)

Shades of Blue is the 18th album released by Ben E. King and was released in 1999.

== Track listing ==
1. "Little Mama" – 3:32
2. "You're Drivin' Me Crazy" – 3:34
3. "Just for the Thrill" – 3:51
4. "They Can't Take That Away from Me" – 4:18
5. "Hallelujah I Love Her So" – 3:27
6. "Song for Jennie" – 3:45
7. "There'll Be Some Changes Made" – 3:45
8. "Stairway to the Stars" – 5:43
9. "You'd Be So Nice to Come Home to" – 2:19
10. "I Want a Little Girl" – 3:09
11. "Baby Won't You Please Come Home" – 4:28
12. "Cry" – 5:17
13. "Learnin' the Blues" – 4:30

== Personnel ==
- Ben E. King - executive producer, liner notes, vocals
- Steve Alcott - bass guitar
- Todd Anderson - alto saxophone, tenor Saxophone
- Regis Andiorio - violin
- Michael Blake - flute, tenor saxophone
- Crispin Cioe - baritone saxophone
- Rusty Cloud - piano
- Jim Clouse - engineer, mastering, mixing, producer, tenor saxophone
- Lou Gimenez - sound editing
- Guido Gonzalez - trumpet
- Alex Harding - baritone saxophone
- Graham Hawthorne - drums
- Aaron Heick - flute, alto saxophone
- Richard Hendrickson - violin
- Ned Holder - trombone
- Daniel Hovey - guitar
- Milt Jackson - vibraphone
- Dale Kleps - flute, baritone saxophone
- Dan Levine - trombone
- Steve Little - drums
- David Longworth - drums
- Richard Maximoff - viola
- David "Fathead" Newman - tenor saxophone
- Tim Ouimette - arranger, conductor, flugelhorn, liner notes, producer, trumpet
- Steve Remote - mixing engineer
- John Walsh - trumpet
