= Seven Letters (Ben E. King album) =

Studio album by Ben E. King
- Released: April 5, 1965
- Genre: Soul
- Length: 31:36
- Label: Atco Records
- Producer: Ahmet Ertegün, Bert Berns, Jerry Wexler

Ben E. King chronology
Ben E. King's Greatest Hits (1964)	Seven Letters (1965)	What Is Soul (1967)

Professional ratings
Review scores
Source	Rating
Record Mirror	5/5 stars

Seven Letters is the sixth album and fifth studio album by Ben E. King, and the fourth studio album on the Atco label. The album was engineered by Tom Dowd and supervised by Ahmet Ertegün, Bert Berns and Jerry Wexler.

== Track listing ==
1. "Seven Letters" (Ben E. King) - (2:51)
2. "River of Tears" (Eugene Washington) - (2:26)
3. "I'm Standing By" (Jerry Wexler, Betty Nelson) - (2:49)
4. "Jamaica" (Ben E. King) - (2:39)
5. "Down Home" (Gerry Goffin, Carole King) - (2:49)
6. "Si Señor" (Adapted and arranged by Jerry Wexler) (2:32)
7. "It's All Over" (Mike Leander, Bert Russell) - (3:15)
8. "Let the Water Run Down" (Bert Russell) - (2:35)
9. "This Is My Dream" (Rudy Clark) - (2:37)
10. "It's No Good for Me" (Bill Grant, Bernie Baum, Florence Kaye) - (2:20)
11. "In the Middle of the Night" (Eddie Snyder) - (2:31)
12. "Don't Drive Me Away" (Don Covay, Horace Ott) - (2:12)
