= (If You Cry) True Love, True Love =

Single by The Drifters

from the album The Drifters' Greatest Hits
- B-side: "Dance with Me"
- Released: September 18, 1959
- Genre: R&B
- Length: 2:17
- Label: Atlantic; 2040
- Songwriters: Doc Pomus, Mort Shuman
- Producer: Jerry Leiber and Mike Stoller

The Drifters singles chronology
"There Goes My Baby" (1959)	"(If You Cry) True Love, True Love" (1959)	"This Magic Moment" (1960)

"(If You Cry) True Love, True Love" is a song written by Doc Pomus and Mort Shuman and performed by The Drifters. In 1959, the track reached No. 5 on the U.S. R&B chart and No. 33 on the U.S. pop chart.

It was featured on their 1960 album, The Drifters' Greatest Hits.

== Other versions ==
- The Mudlarks released a version as the B-side to their 1959 single "Tennessee".
