= What's Important to Me =

Studio album by Ben E. King
- Released: 1991
- Genre: Soul
- Length: 37:57
- Label: Ichiban Records
- Producer: Ben E. King, John E. Abbey, Buzz Amato

Ben E. King chronology
Stand by Me: The Ultimate Collection (1987)	What's Important to Me (1991)	Anthology (1993)

What's Important to Me is the 17th album by Ben E. King, released in 1991. King's first studio album in four years produced the singles "What's Important to Me" and "You've Got All of Me".

In an interview with the Yorkshire Evening Press, King noted how his music had evolved over the years to keep up with the styles of younger generations, which is why this album featured a song with rap music in it.

== Track listing ==
1. "It's Your Love (That Makes Me Happy)" (King, William Bush, Rita Saunders) – 4:51
2. "You've Got All of Me" (Ben E. King) – 2:06
3. "Major Malfunction" (King, William Bush, Rita Saunders) – 4:47
4. "You Still Move Me" (Dan Seals) – 5:03
5. "She's Gone Again" – 4:11 (Ben E. King)
6. "So Important to Me" (King, Rita Saunders) – 4:32
7. "You Can Count on Me" (William Stuckley) – 4:16
8. "It's All Right" (Curtis Mayfield) – 4:12
9. "I'm Gonna Be Somebody" (Ben E. King) – 3:59
