= Play That Song =

Play That Song may refer to:

- "Play That Song" (Tony Touch song), 2005
- "Play That Song" (Train song), 2016
- "Hey DJ! (Play That Song)", a song by N-Tyce from their 1998 album All Day Every Day

== See also ==
- "Play That Song Again", a song by Joan Jett and the Blackhearts from their 1988 album Up Your Alley
- Don't Play That Song (disambiguation)
