= The Soul Clan =

- Origin: New York, New York
- Genres: Soul, rhythm and blues
- Years active: 1966-1969; 1981
- Label: Atlantic Records
- Past members: Solomon Burke (deceased); Arthur Conley (deceased); Don Covay (deceased); Ben E. King (deceased); Otis Redding (deceased); Wilson Pickett (deceased); Joe Tex (deceased)

The Soul Clan was a collective of American soul musicians led by Solomon Burke, which started in 1966 as started by Burke, Otis Redding, Wilson Pickett, Don Covay and Joe Tex. Later, both Pickett and Redding left the collective and were replaced by fellow Atlantic artists such as Arthur Conley (a protege of Redding's) and Ben E. King. After the release of the minor successful R&B song, "Soul Meeting", the collective broke up in 1969. The collective, which included Pickett stepping in for Conley, who had by then settled in Europe, briefly reunited in 1981 for a brief performance before splintering for good.

== Biography ==
In 1966 Burke teamed with fellow Atlantic artists Wilson Pickett, Don Covay, Otis Redding, and Joe Tex to form a coalition called The Soul Clan. In a 1992 interview Burke indicated that The Soul Clan asked Atlantic to advance $1 million to them. "I remember one time we walked in and asked for a million dollars. It was Otis Redding, Joe Tex, Wilson Pickett, Don Covay, Ben E. King and myself. We all went in together. We were all on the charts. We all asked for a million dollars for a real estate project, as an organization, as a soul clan. We intended to buy up a lot of property in the South, in the ghetto areas and re-modeled them and built homes. And, we needed a million dollars to put this project together. We walked into Atlantic asking for that and wound up being put on the back shelf. ... All of us together were asking for a million. You and I know of course that all of us together at that time made millions and millions for Atlantic. Their idea was "to pool their talents and resources, and become a positive force within the black community. They envisioned things like buying ghetto real estate and refurbishing it, providing jobs, building schools, and creating black-owned restaurant franchises that would knock the McDonald's and KFCs out of the box... the possibilities were endless." Burke explained the purpose of this alliance: "We wanted to interlock ourselves as a group, to express to the younger people how strong we should be and to help one another, work with one another and support one another." While "Burke saw the collaboration as a stepping stone toward building an autonomous African-American business empire, ... Covay, more successful as a songwriter than a performer, hoped to promote his own career alongside those of his friends." About this time Burke, Redding and James Brown had discussed forming an organization to provide health care benefits and pensions for older black musicians.

Recording had been delayed initially while Redding underwent throat surgery and recuperated. After Redding died in a plane crash in December 1967, Arthur Conley replaced him, and after Pickett dropped out "supposedly uncomfortable with Burke's grandiose financial plans", he was replaced by Ben E. King. For Burke, Soul Clan was "an expression of solidarity and mutual support by five pillars of soul music." From February 6, 1968, The Soul Clan recorded a single "Soul Meeting" b/w "That's How It Feels" (Atlantic 2530), and a 1969 album, The Soul Clan, featuring both sides of the single and several solo tracks from the individual Clan members. In Sweet Soul Music, Peter Guralnick said "the singers never did get to actually meet in the studio... but instead recorded their vocals separately to a backing track which Covay had put together with Bobby Womack at the Wildwood Studio in Hollywood."

According to Burke, the project fizzled when the power structure realized these guys, requested an advance of $1 million to invest in the Black communities in the South, and wanted to do more than make a record. Although the "Soul Meeting" single made it to #34 on Billboard's soul singles chart in July 1968, Burke alleges "the record was stopped and banned...we were going against the grain of what black entertainers are supposed to do. We were all just supposed to go out and buy red Cadillacs. We weren't supposed to go out and start talking about spending millions of dollars on building and developing... We were supposed to talk about having parties and good times and eatin' barbecue ribs. You know, pork chops." Soon after Burke left Atlantic Records.

The Soul Clan members were poorly served by Atlantic, which failed to invest in publicity and actively sabotaged their recording schedule. As Rob Whatman explains: "Times were changing, and none of the final line-up of the Soul Clan were experimenting with, nor being encouraged to try, the new sounds of funk that might have boosted and elongated their hit careers. Atlantic Records was happy to let them fade away, while sucking up the back-catalogues and talents of regional hit factories such as Stax. No Marvin Gayes or Stevie Wonders would be nurtured in New York City." Rob Whatman, "The Soul Clan: Where you going, Joe?...", (May 13, 2006).

In July 1981, the Soul Clan officially reunited for a sold out concert at the Savoy Theater in Manhattan, New York City (with Pickett stepping in for Conley, who was in Europe at the time), but it was the last time they would work together" after a chaotic concert punctuated with a "busted sound system, dead mikes, band miscues, and 'unauthorized backstage personnel' scuttled plans for a [national] tour." The Soul Clan gathered in August 1982 at the funeral of Joe Tex.
