= What Is Soul =

What Is Soul?

Studio album by Ben E. King
- Released: March 8, 1967
- Recorded: January 21, 1967
- Venue: NYC
- Studio: Talent Masters
- Genre: Soul
- Label: Atco
- Producer: Bert Berns

What is Soul is the seventh album and sixth studio album by Ben E. King, and his fifth and last studio album on the Atco label.

== Track listing ==
1. "The Record (Baby I Love You)" (Kenny Young, Arthur Resnick)
2. "She's Gone Again" (Ben E. King)
3. "There's No Place To Hide" (Roger Atkins, Helen Miller)
4. "Cry No More" (Bert Berns, Jerry Ragovoy)
5. "Goodnight My Love, Pleasant Dreams" (George Motola, John Marascalco)
6. "Katherine" (Ben E. King, Bob Gallo)
7. "I Can't Break The News To Myself" (Jimmy Williams, Larry Harrison)
8. "I Swear By Stars Above" (J.R. Bailey, Johnny Northern)
9. "Get in a Hurry" (Joe Simon)
10. "They Don't Give Medals To Yesterday's Heroes" (Burt Bacharach, Hal David)
11. "Teeny Wheeny Little Bit" (Ben E. King)
12. "What Is Soul?" (Ben E. King, Bob Gallo)

== Personnel ==
- Ben E. King – vocals
- Art Farmer – trumpet
- Dave Burns – trumpet
- George Jeffers – trombone
- Bill Bivens – tenor sax
- Haywood Henry – baritone sax
- Robert Banks – piano
- Billy Butler – guitar
- Chuck Rainey – electric bass
- Bernard Purdie – drums
- Strings
- Bob Gallo and Eric Gale (arr., dir.)
