= Dance with Me (The Drifters song) =

Single by The Drifters

from the album The Drifters' Greatest Hits
- A-side: "(If You Cry) True Love, True Love"
- Released: September 18, 1959
- Genre: Doo-wop
- Length: 2:21
- Label: Atlantic; 2040
- Songwriter(s): Lewis Lebish, Elmo Glick
- Producer(s): Jerry Leiber and Mike Stoller

The Drifters singles chronology
"There Goes My Baby" (1959)	"Dance with Me" (1959)	"This Magic Moment" (1960)

"Dance with Me" is a song written by Lewis Lebish and Elmo Glick and performed by The Drifters with Ben E. King singing lead. In 1959, the track reached No. 2 on the U.S. R&B chart, No. 15 on the U.S. pop chart, and No. 17 on the UK Singles Chart.

It was featured on their 1960 album, The Drifters' Greatest Hits.

== Other versions ==
- Rick James released a version of the song as a single as part of a medley with "This Magic Moment" in 1989. It reached No. 74 on the U.S. R&B chart.
- Carla Thomas released a version of the song on her 1961 album Gee Whiz.
- Billy J. Kramer and The Dakotas released a version of the song on their 1964 EP From a Window.
- Emile Ford released a version of the song as the B-side to his 1979 single "How Can I Live Without You".
