= Save the Last Dance for Me (album) =

Studio album by Ben E. King
- Released: 1987
- Genre: Soul
- Label: EMI-Manhattan
- Producer: John Paul Jones, Lamont Dozier, Mick Jones, Preston Glass, Alan Glass

Ben E. King chronology
Street Tough (1981)	Save the Last Dance for Me (1987)	Stand by Me: The Ultimate Collection (1987)

Save the Last Dance for Me is Ben E. King's 15th album and 14th studio album. It was released under the EMI-Manhattan label. The album was released in 1987 and was King's first release in six years. All the tracks are new recordings of hits by King's old group The Drifters, originally recorded between 1959 and 1964. Note that King did not originally sing lead on all the Drifters versions of these songs, having left the Drifters in 1960.

This was King's last new release as an LP. Subsequent studio releases were issued on Compact disc as the format became more popular.

== Track listing ==
1. "Save the Last Dance for Me"
2. "Because of Last Night"
3. "Lover's Question"
4. "Whatever This Is (It Ain't True Love)"
5. "Halfway to Paradise"
6. "Let a Man Do It for Ya"
7. "I Cry for You"
8. "Test of Time"
9. "Two Lovers"
