= Limb independence =

Percussion term

Limb independence (two-limb or four-limb independence) is a term commonly used by drummers to describe the coordination ability that is necessary for the physical multitasking of advanced drumming. Drummers use four limbs when they play a drum set (it is two-limb independence when playing a drum pad or snare). For example, the left foot on the hi-hat (sometimes on another bass drum if double bass drums are used), the right foot on the bass drum, and the two hands on other cymbals and drums on the drum kit. Limb independence allows them to play different rhythms, without having to consciously focus on each one individually. This is especially important in jazz and Latin based drumming. It is also one of the more difficult parts of learning the drums, since it is harder to process.
