= There Goes My Baby (The Drifters song) =

1959 single by The Drifters

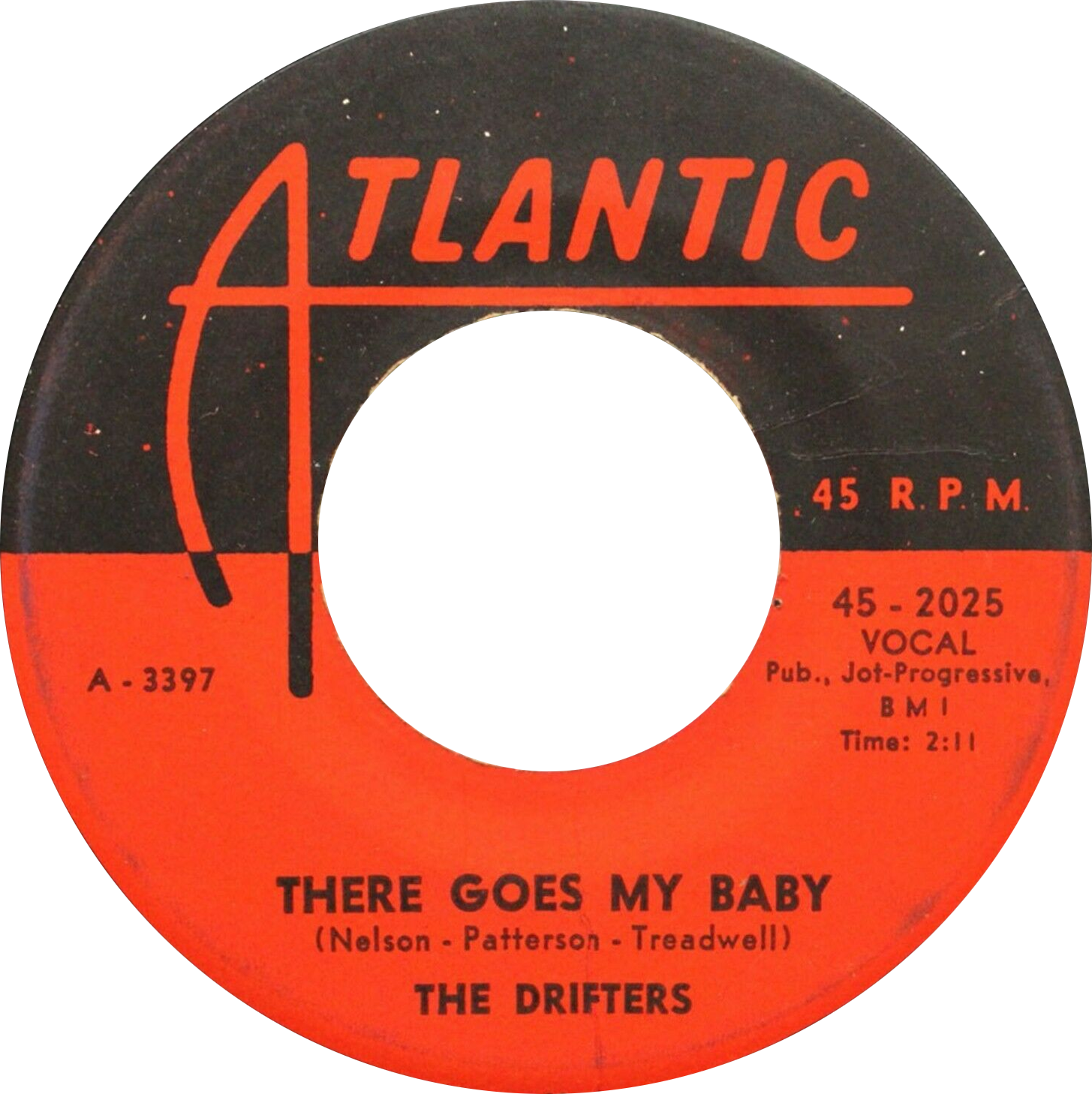
- One of side-A labels of the US 7-inch (45 RPM) single

Single by The Drifters

from the album The Drifters' Greatest Hits
- B-side: "Oh My Love"
- Released: April 24, 1959
- Recorded: March 6, 1959
- Genre: Soul, rhythm and blues, doo-wop
- Length: 2:08
- Label: Atlantic
- Songwriters: Benjamin Nelson, Lover Patterson, George Treadwell
- Producer: Jerry Leiber and Mike Stoller

The Drifters singles chronology
"Drip Drop" (1958)	"There Goes My Baby" (1959)	"(If You Cry) True Love, True Love"/"Dance with Me" (1959)

"There Goes My Baby" is a song written by Ben E. King (Benjamin Earl Nelson), Lover Patterson, and George Treadwell, which was produced by Jerry Leiber and Mike Stoller for The Drifters. This was the first single by the second incarnation of the Drifters (previously known as the 5 Crowns), who assumed the group name in 1958 after manager George Treadwell fired the remaining members of the original lineup. The Atlantic Records release was Ben E. King's debut recording as the lead singer of the group.

== History ==
Leiber and Stoller used a radically different approach to production from what Ahmet Ertegun and Jerry Wexler had employed with the original Clyde McPhatter-led Drifters. The combination of new style and new group fit, and the song reached number two on the Billboard Hot 100, behind "A Big Hunk o' Love" by Elvis Presley. "There Goes My Baby" also hit number one on the Billboard R&B chart. On the Cash Box sales chart, it likewise went to number one for two weeks, in the summer of 1959.

== Song ==
The lyrics are loosely structured, almost free-form at a time when rhyming lines were mandatory. The accompaniment features a violin section playing saxophone-like riffs in rock and roll style. The lead voice is in high gospel-style.

(There goes my baby) Whoa-oh-oh-oh-oh
(There goes my baby) Yeah, yeah, yeah, yeah
(There goes my baby) Whoa-oh-oh-oh
(There she goes) Yeah! (There she goes)

== Legacy ==
This recording introduced the idea of using strings, a Brazilian baion and elaborate production values on an R&B recording to enhance the emotional power of black music. The string arrangement is by Stan Applebaum. This pointed the way to the coming era of soul music as the popularity of the doo-wop vocal groups peaked and faded. Phil Spector studied this production model under Leiber and Stoller.

In 2010, the song was ranked #196 on Rolling Stone's 500 Greatest Songs of All Time. The song has been covered by many artists, including Jay and the Americans, the Walker Brothers, and The Walkmen. The song was included in the musical revue Smokey Joe's Cafe.

== Charts ==
Chart (1959)	Peak position
US Billboard Hot 100	2
US Billboard Hot R&B Sides	1

== Donna Summer version ==
"There Goes My Baby"

Single by Donna Summer

from the album Cats Without Claws
- B-side: "Maybe It's Over"
- Released: July 5, 1984
- Genre: Rock; post-disco; synth-pop
- Length: 4:05
- Label: Geffen (U.S.); Warner Bros. (Europe)
- Songwriters: Benjamin Nelson, Lover Patterson, George Treadwell, Jerry Leiber, Mike Stoller
- Producer: Michael Omartian

Donna Summer singles chronology
"Love Has a Mind of Its Own" (1984)	"There Goes My Baby" (1984)	"Supernatural Love" (1984)

Music video
- "There Goes My Baby" on YouTube

Donna Summer's version of "There Goes My Baby" was issued as the first single on July 5, 1984, from her 1984 album Cats Without Claws by Geffen Records and Warner Bros. Records. Her rendition was produced by Michael Omartian. The single became a moderate hit, peaking at #21 on the US Hot 100, and in the top twenty of the US R&B chart. It also peaked #15 in Spain Radio chart. Summer's version of this song features an electro-pop sound and was accompanied by a high-quality music video featuring Summer and husband Bruce Sudano as a down-on-their-luck couple at the outbreak of World War II. The video was played in heavy rotation on the MTV network, becoming the last Summer video to achieve this. With this single, Summer earned her nineteenth - and second to last - US Top 40 hit.

=== Charts ===
Chart (1984)	Peak position
Australia (Kent Music Report)	52
Canada Top Singles (RPM)	31
Canada Adult Contemporary (RPM)	23
Netherlands (Single Top 100)	31
Netherlands (Dutch Top 40)	31
Spain (Los 40 Principales)	15
UK Singles (Official Charts)	99
US Billboard Hot 100	21
US Hot R&B/Hip-Hop Songs (Billboard)	20
