= Gabriel Ruiz (songwriter) =

Mexican songwriter (1908–1999)

Gabriel Ruiz Galindo (March 18, 1908 in Guadalajara, Jalisco – January 31, 1999 Mexico City) was a Mexican songwriter. He was son of Rosalío Ruiz and Aurelia Galindo. He was a founding member of the Society of Authors and Composers of Mexico. He won the National Award of Arts.

== Songs ==
- Amor (1943 song)

=== Film music ===
- 1952 Delirio tropical.
- 1945 La sombra de Chucho el Roto.
- 1943 Tentación.
- 1940 Man or Devil.
