= Spanish Harlem (album) =

Studio album by Ben E. King
- Released: May 1, 1961
- Recorded: 1960–1961
- Genres: Latin, soul
- Length: 31:02
- Label: Atco
- Producers: Jerry Leiber, Mike Stoller

Ben E. King chronology
Spanish Harlem (1961)	Ben E. King Sings for Soulful Lovers (1962)

Singles from Spanish Harlem
- 1. "Spanish Harlem" Released: December 1960; 2. "Amor" Released: 1961

Professional ratings
Review scores
Source	Rating
AllMusic	3.5/5 stars
The Encyclopedia of Popular Music	3/5 stars

Spanish Harlem is the debut album by Ben E. King, released by Atco Records as an LP in 1961. The title track and "Amor" were released as singles. The latter was released as "Amor Amor" on London. Stan Applebaum was the arranger.

The title track peaked at No. 10 on the Billboard Hot 100. The album peaked at No. 30 on the UK Albums chart.

== Track listing ==
1. "Amor" (Gabriel Ruíz, Sunny Skylar, Ricardo López Méndez) - [3:02]
2. "Sway" (Norman Gimbel, Gabriel Ruíz) - [2:18]
3. "Come Closer to Me" (Al Stewart, Osvaldo Farrés) - [2:35]
4. "Perfidia" (Alberto Dominguez, Milton Leeds) - [2:04]
5. "Granada" (Agustín Lara, Dorothy Dodd) - [2:27]
6. "Sweet and Gentle" (George Thorn, Otilio del Portal, Martin Ledyard) - [2:24]
7. "Perhaps, Perhaps, Perhaps" (Joe Davis, Osvaldo Farrés) - [2:12]
8. "Frenesí" (Alberto Dominguez, Leonard Whitcup) - [3:09]
9. "Souvenir of Mexico" (Mort Shuman, Doc Pomus) - [2:24]
10. "Bésame Mucho" (Sunny Skylar, Consuelo Velázquez) - [2:57]
11. "Love Me, Love Me" (Ben E. King) - [2:37]
12. "Spanish Harlem" (Jerry Leiber, Phil Spector) - [2:53]

== Personnel ==
- Ben E. King – vocals
- George Duvivier – double bass
- Al Caiola – guitar
- Ernest Hayes – piano
- Gary Chester – drums
- Charlie Margulis – trumpet
- Ray Barretto – percussion
- Al Schackman – marimba
- George Barnes – guitar
- Urbie Green – trombone
- Stan Applebaum – arrangements

Technical

- Allen Vogel, Loring Eutemey – artwork
