= That's When It Hurts =

Single by Ben E. King

from the album Ben E. King's Greatest Hits
- B-side: "Around the Corner"
- Released: March 1964
- Genre: Soul
- Length: 3:08
- Label: Atco Records; 45-6288
- Songwriter(s): Jerry Wexler, Bert Berns
- Producer(s): Bert Berns

Ben E. King singles chronology
"What Now My Love" (January 1964)	"That's When It Hurts" (1964)	"What Can a Man Do" (June 1964)

"That’s When It Hurts" is a song written by Jerry Wexler and Bert Berns and performed by Ben E. King. In 1964, the track reached #17 on the U.S. R&B chart and #63 on the Billboard chart.

It was featured on his 1964 album, Ben E. King's Greatest Hits.

The single's B-side, "Around the Corner", reached #125 on the U.S. pop chart.

== Other versions ==
- Johnnie Mae Matthews released a version as the B-side to her 1969 single, "I Have No Choice".
- The Silvertones recorded the song for their 1973 album Silver Bullets.
