= Amor (Gabriel Ruiz song) =

Single by Bing Crosby

Single by Bing Crosby
- Released: 1944
- Recorded: February 17, 1944
- Genre: Latin
- Length: 2:40
- Label: Decca
- Songwriters: Gabriel Ruiz; Ricardo López Méndez; English lyrics by Sunny Skylar

"Amor"

Single by Ben E. King

from the album Spanish Harlem
- B-side: "Souvenir of Mexico"
- Released: 1961
- Genre: Latin; soul
- Length: 3:02
- Label: Atco
- Songwriters: Gabriel Ruiz; Ricardo López Méndez; English lyrics by Sunny Skylar
- Producers: Jerry Leiber; Mike Stoller

Ben E. King singles chronology
"Stand by Me" (1961)	"Amor" (1961)	"Young Boy Blues" (1961)

"Amor, Amor, Amor"

Single by Luis Miguel

from the album Mis Romances
- Released: October 1, 2001
- Recorded: 2001
- Genre: Latin
- Length: 3:42
- Label: WEA
- Songwriters: Gabriel Ruiz; Ricardo López Méndez
- Producer: Luis Miguel

Luis Miguel singles chronology
"Y" (2000)	"Amor, Amor, Amor" (2001)	"Como Duele" (2002)

"Amor", also known as "Amor Amor" and "Amor Amor Amor", is a popular song published in 1943.

The music was written by Gabriel Ruiz, with original Spanish lyrics by Ricardo López Méndez and English lyrics by Sunny Skylar.

== Versions ==
The two biggest-selling versions in the United States were recorded by Bing Crosby and Andy Russell.

Crosby's version was recorded on February 17, 1944 for Decca Records as catalog number 18608. It first reached the Billboard Best Seller chart on June 29, 1944, and lasted seven weeks on the chart, peaking at number four. The flip side was "Long Ago (and Far Away)", which also charted, making this a two-sided hit.

The recording by Andy Russell was released by Capitol Records as catalog number 156. It first reached the Billboard Best Seller chart on May 25, 1944, and lasted eight weeks on the chart, peaking at number five.

In 1949, the song was recorded by Alfredo Antonini and his orchestra in collaboration with Victoria Cordova and John Serry Sr. for Muzak.

In 1961, American soul singer Ben E. King covered the song, and it appears on his album Spanish Harlem. It was released as a single and peaked at number 18 on the Billboard Hot 100 and number 10 on the R&B chart.

In 1978, the German Schlager singer Bata Illic released a German version with lyrics by Michael Marian.

In 2001, Luis Miguel covered the song, which was released as the lead single from his album Mis Romances (2001). The song peaked at number 13 on the Billboard Hot Latin Songs chart. It served as the main theme for the Mexican telenovela El Manantial.

== Film appearances ==
- 1944 Broadway Rhythm and Lights of Old Santa Fe.
- 1949 Maytime in Mayfair.
- 1959 This Earth Is Mine – sung in Spanish by an uncredited male singer.
- 1997 Lolita.
- Andy Russell sang a mixture of English and Spanish in the 1946 film Breakfast in Hollywood.
