= I Count the Tears =

Single by The Drifters

from the album Save the Last Dance for Me
- B-side: "Suddenly There's a Valley"
- Released: November 30, 1960
- Genre: Rhythm and blues
- Length: 2:09
- Label: Atlantic; 2087
- Songwriters: Doc Pomus, Mort Shuman
- Producer: Jerry Leiber and Mike Stoller

The Drifters singles chronology
"Save the Last Dance for Me" (1960)	"I Count the Tears" (1960)	"Some Kind of Wonderful" (1961)

"I Count the Tears" is a song written by Doc Pomus and Mort Shuman and performed by The Drifters, with Ben E. King singing lead. In 1960, the track reached No. 6 on the U.S. R&B chart, No. 17 on the U.S. pop chart, and No. 28 on the UK Singles Chart.

It was featured on their 1962 album, Save the Last Dance for Me.

A theme from the song was later used for the chorus of "Let's Live for Today".

== Other versions ==
- The Aces released a version of the song as a single in 1964.
- The Searchers released a version of the song on their 1964 album This Is Us.
- Tony Orlando released a version of the song as the B-side to his 1978 single "A Lover's Question".
- Rosanne Cash recorded the song for the 1995 tribute album Till The Night Is Gone: A Tribute To Doc Pomus.
