= Seven Letters (song) =

Single by Ben E. King

from the album Seven Letters
- B-side: "River of Tears"
- Released: December 1964
- Genre: Soul
- Length: 2:47
- Label: Atco Records; 45-6328
- Songwriter(s): Ben E. King

Ben E. King singles chronology
"It's All Over" (September 1964)	"Seven Letters" (1964)	"The Record (Baby I Love You)" (March 1965)

"Seven Letters" is a song written and performed by Ben E. King. In 1964, the track reached #11 on the U.S. R&B chart and #45 on the Billboard chart.

It was featured on his 1964 album, Seven Letters.

== Other versions ==
- Derrick Morgan released a version as a single in 1969.
- Delroy Wilson released a version as a single in 1975.
- Warren Storm released a version as a single in 1983.
