= Young Boy Blues =

Studio album by Ben E. King
- Released: August 24, 1964
- Genre: Soul
- Label: Atco

Ben E. King chronology
Don't Play That Song! (1962)	Young Boy Blues (1964)	Ben E. King's Greatest Hits (1964)

Young Boy Blues is the fourth studio album by Ben E. King, and the first of his albums released by Clarion Records, a subsidiary budget label of Atlantic Records. It was released in 1964.

== Track listing ==
1. "Young Boy Blues" (Phil Spector, Doc Pomus)
2. "I (Who Have Nothing)" (Carlo Donida, Giulio Rapetti, Jerry Leiber, Mike Stoller)
3. "Ecstasy" (Phil Spector, Doc Pomus)
4. "Here Comes the Night" (Doc Pomus, Mort Shuman)
5. "My Heart Cries for You" (Carl Sigman, Percy Faith)
6. "Yes" (Jerry Leiber, Mike Stoller)
7. "Gloria Gloria" (Ben E. King)
8. "Brace Yourself" (Otis Blackwell)
9. "I'm Standing By" (Betty Nelson, Jerry Wexler)
10. "Show Me the Way" (Gerry Goffin, Carole King)
