= Stand by Me (Ben E. King song) =

1961 single by Ben E. King

- One of side-A labels of the original 1961 US single

Single by Ben E. King

from the album Don't Play That Song!
- B-side: "On the Horizon" (1961) "Yakety Yak" by the Coasters (1986)
- Released: 1961
- Recorded: October 27, 1960
- Genre: R&B; soul
- Length: 2:57
- Label: Atco
- Songwriters: Ben E. King; Jerry Leiber; Mike Stoller
- Producers: Jerry Leiber; Mike Stoller

Ben E. King singles chronology
"First Taste of Love" (1961)	"Stand by Me" (1961)	"Amor" (1961)

Official vinyl video
- "Stand by Me" by Ben E. King on YouTube

Ben E. King singles chronology
"Souvenirs of Love" (1981)	"Stand by Me" (1986)	"Spanish Harlem" (1987)

"Stand by Me" is a song originally recorded by American singer-songwriter Ben E. King in 1961, and written by him, along with Jerry Leiber and Mike Stoller, who together used the pseudonym Elmo Glick. According to King, the title is derived from, and was inspired by, a spiritual written by Sam Cooke and J. W. Alexander called "Stand by Me Father", recorded by the Soul Stirrers with Johnnie Taylor singing lead.

There have been over 500 recorded versions of the song, performed by many artists, notably Otis Redding, John Lennon, Maurice White, Demis Roussos, Muhammad Ali, 4 the Cause, Tracy Chapman, musicians of the Playing for Change project, Florence and the Machine, Weezer, and the Kingdom Choir.

"Stand by Me" was featured on the soundtrack of the 1986 film Stand by Me, and a corresponding music video, featuring King along with actors River Phoenix and Wil Wheaton, was released to promote the film. The song was also featured in a 1987 European commercial of Levi's 501 jeans, contributing to greater success in Europe. In 2012, its royalties were estimated to have topped $22.8 million (£17 million), making it the sixth highest-earning song of its era. Fifty percent of the royalties were paid to King. In 2015, King's original version was inducted into the National Recording Registry by the Library of Congress, as "culturally, historically, or aesthetically significant", just under five weeks before his death. Later in the year, the 2015 lineup of the Drifters recorded it in tribute.

== Writing and recording ==
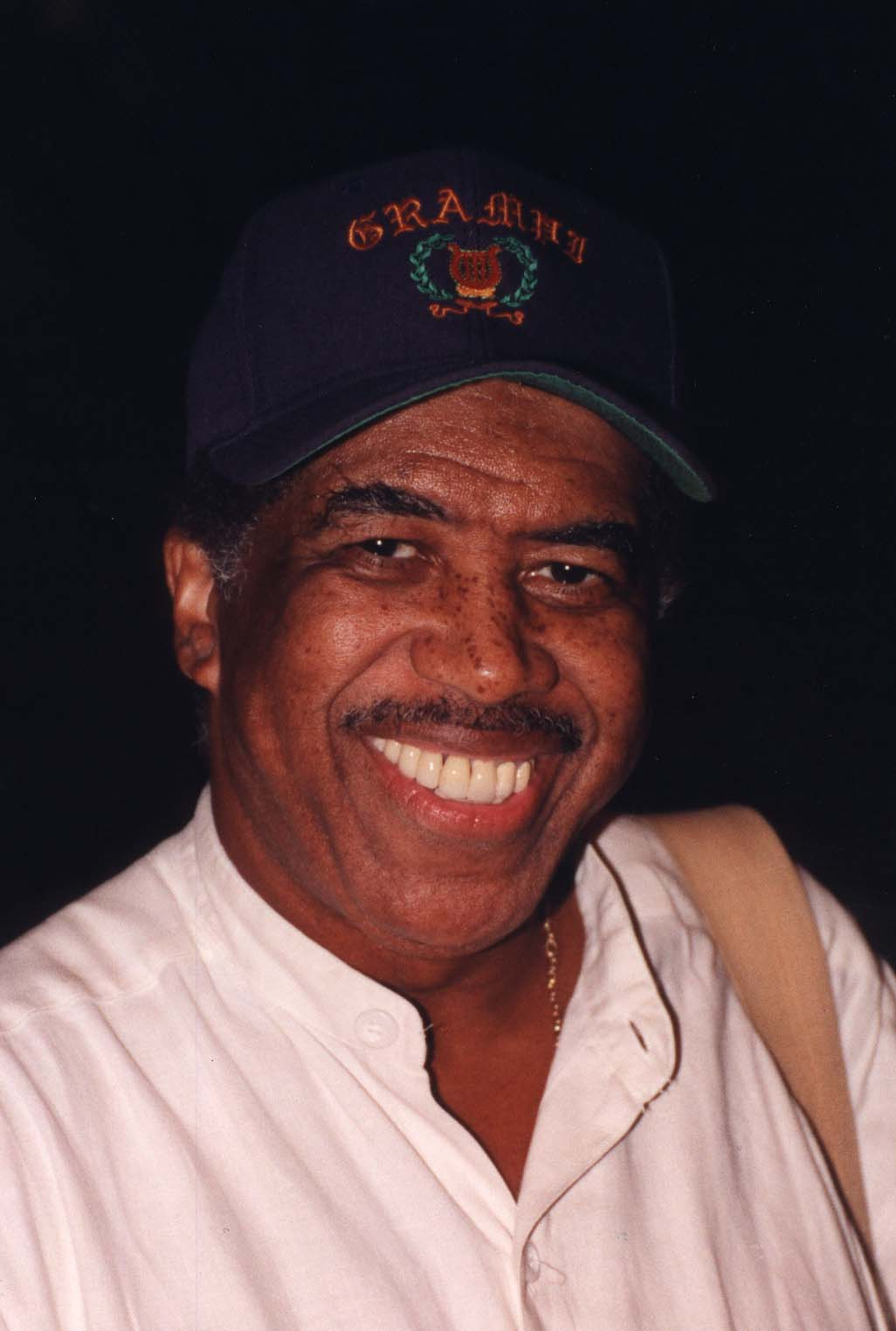
Ben E. King (pictured in 1990s) originally sang the song, becoming a hit in the US in 1961 and again in 1986.

In 1960, Ben E. King was inspired to update the early 20th-century gospel hymn "Stand by Me" by Charles Albert Tindley, which was based on Psalm 46, "will not we fear, though the Earth be removed, and though the mountains be carried into the midst of the sea." According to the documentary History of Rock 'n' Roll, King had no intention of recording the song himself. King had written it for the Drifters, who passed on recording it. After the "Spanish Harlem" recording session in 1960, King had some studio time left over. The session's producers, Jerry Leiber and Mike Stoller, asked if he had any more songs. King played it on the piano for them. They liked it and called the studio musicians back in to record it.

Stoller recalls it differently:

I remember arriving at our office as Jerry and Ben were working on lyrics for a new song. King had the beginnings of a melody that he was singing a cappella. I went to the piano and worked up the harmonies, developing a bass pattern that became the signature of the song. Ben and Jerry quickly finished the lyrics....

In another interview, Stoller said:

Ben E. had the beginnings of a song—both words and music. He worked on the lyrics together with Jerry, and I added elements to the music, particularly the bass line. To some degree, it's based on a gospel song called "Lord Stand by Me". I have a feeling that Jerry and Ben E. were inspired by it. Ben, of course, had a strong background in church music. He's a 50% writer on the song, and Jerry and I are 25% each.... When I walked in, Jerry and Ben E. were working on the lyrics to a song. They were at an old oak desk we had in the office. Jerry was sitting behind it, and Benny was sitting on the top. They looked up and said they were writing a song. I said, "Let me hear it." ... Ben began to sing the song a cappella. I went over to the upright piano and found the chord changes behind the melody he was singing. It was in the key of A. Then I created a bass line. Jerry said, "Man that's it!" We used my bass pattern for a starting point and, later, we used it as the basis for the string arrangement created by Stanley Applebaum.

The personnel on the song included Romeo Penque on sax, Ernie Hayes on piano, Al Caiola and Charles McCracken on guitars, Lloyd Trotman on double bass, Phil Kraus on percussion, and Gary Chester on drums, plus a wordless mixed chorus and strings. Songwriting credits on the single were shown as King and Elmo Glick—a pseudonym used by Leiber and Stoller.

=== Structure ===
The song uses a version of the common chord progression now called the '50s progression, which has been called the "'Stand by Me' changes" after the song.

== Release and reception ==
King's record went to number 1 on the R&B charts and was a Top Ten hit on the US charts twice—in its original release, entering the Billboard chart on May 13, 1961 and peaking at number 4 on June 16, 1961, and a 1986 re-release coinciding with its use as the theme song for the film of the same name following its appearance in the film, when it peaked at number 9 on December 20, 1986 – January 3, 1987.policy is "no blue jeans". "Stand by Me" also topped the charts in Canada, Ireland, and the United Kingdom upon its re-release. In the latter country, the song topped the UK Singles Chart in February 1987, mostly because of the jeans TV commercial, originally peaking at number 27 on the UK Singles Chart on its original release in Britain in 1961. Originally "Stand by Me" was not released on an album until it had been out as a single for over a year, eventually appearing on King's Don't Play That Song! album in 1962.

"Stand by Me" was ranked 122nd on Rolling Stone's list of the 500 Greatest Songs of All Time. In 1999, BMI named it as the fourth most-performed song of the 20th century, with about seven million performances. On March 27, 2012, the Songwriters Hall of Fame announced that the song would receive its 2012 Towering Song Award and that King would be honored with the 2012 Towering Performance Award for his recording of it. In February 2019, the Smooth Radio network in the United Kingdom called it one "of the best love songs of the 1960s".

"Stand by Me" was inducted into the Grammy Hall of Fame in 1998.

== Chart performance ==
For the year-end charts in the US, the song was the number 63 song of 1961 and number 67 of 1987.

=== Weekly charts ===
1961 weekly chart performance for "Stand by Me"
Chart (1961)	Peak position
Canada (CHUM Hit Parade)	16
UK Singles (Official Charts)	27
US Billboard Hot 100	4
US Hot R&B Sides (Billboard)	1
US Cash Box Top 100	3

Weekly chart performance for "Stand by Me" upon being used in the film of the same name
Chart (1986–1987)	Peak position
Australia (Kent Music Report)	82
Austria (Ö3 Austria Top 40)	7
Canada (RPM)	1
France (SNEP)	20
Ireland (IRMA)	1
Italy (FIMI)	17
Netherlands (Dutch Top 40)	7
Netherlands (Single Top 100)	7
New Zealand (Recorded Music NZ)	45
Norway (VG-lista)	9
Sweden (Sverigetopplistan)	8
Switzerland (Schweizer Hitparade)	3
UK Singles (Official Charts)	1
US Billboard Hot 100	9
US Adult Contemporary (Billboard)	10
West Germany (GfK)	2

2022–2026 weekly chart performance for "Stand by Me"
Chart (2022–2026)	Peak position
Hungary (Single Top 40)	40
Sweden Heatseeker (Sverigetopplistan)	9

=== Year-end charts ===
Annual chart performance for "Stand by Me"
Chart (1986–1987)	Position
Belgium (Ultratop Flanders 1987)	79
Canada (RPM 1986)	68
Canada (RPM 1987)	58
European Hot 100 Singles (1987)	23
Netherlands (Dutch Top 40 1987)	91
Netherlands (Single Top 100 1987)	84
UK Singles (OCC 1987)	4
US Top Pop Singles (Billboard 1987)	67
West Germany (Official German Charts 1987)	21

=== Certifications and sales ===
Certifications and sales for "Stand by Me"
Region	Certification	Certified units/sales
Canada (Music Canada) physical	Gold	50,000^{^}
Denmark (IFPI Danmark)	Platinum	90,000^{‡}
Italy (FIMI) sales since 2009	Platinum	100,000^{‡}
Japan (RIAJ) 1991 physical release	Platinum	100,000^{^}
Japan (RIAJ) Full-length ringtone	Gold	100,000^{*}
United Kingdom (BPI)	3× Platinum	1,800,000^{‡}
United States digital sales	—	1,639,489
^{*} Sales figures based on certification alone.^{^} Shipments figures based on certification alone.^{‡} Sales+streaming figures based on certification alone.

== John Lennon version ==
"Stand by Me"
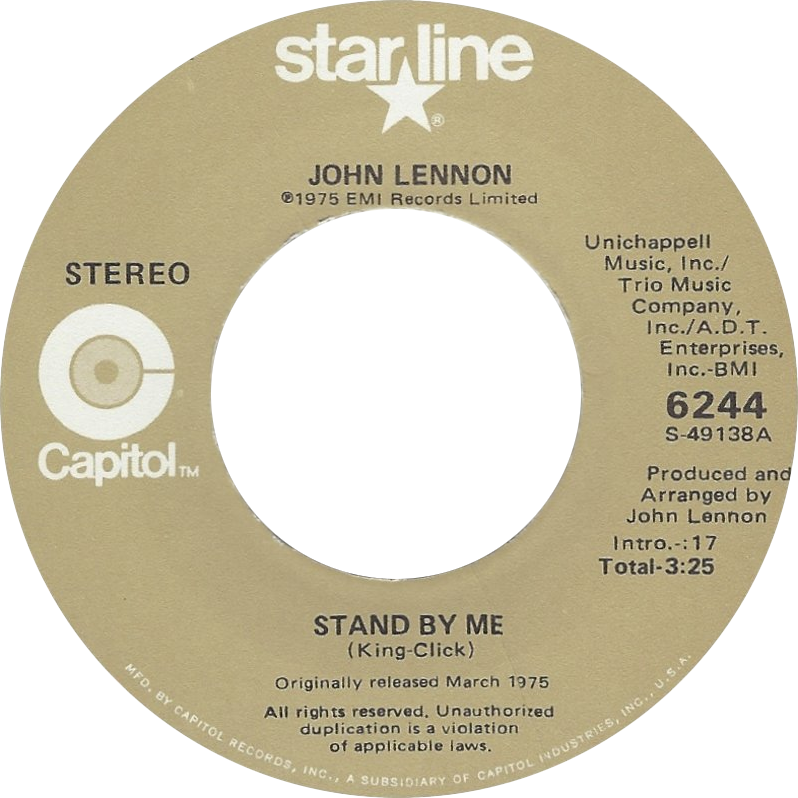
- Side A of a US reissue

Single by John Lennon

from the album Rock 'n' Roll
- B-side: "Move Over Ms. L"
- Released: March 10, 1975
- Recorded: 1974
- Genre: Rock and roll
- Length: 3:26
- Label: Apple
- Producer: John Lennon

John Lennon singles chronology
"Number 9 Dream" (1974)	"Stand by Me" (1975)	"(Just Like) Starting Over" (1980)

Official music video
- "Stand by Me" (Ultimate Mix, 2020) by John Lennon on YouTube

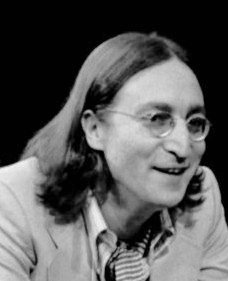
John Lennon in summer 1975

John Lennon recorded his version of the song for his 1975 album Rock 'n' Roll. Lennon's remake became a single three weeks after the album's release and was his last hit prior to his five-year retirement from the music industry. Lennon filmed a performance of the song for The Old Grey Whistle Test in 1975. Cash Box said of it that "John's serenading guitar chords herald this bright new production of one of rockdom's favorites", and that it displays Lennon's "magical, mysterious voice...at his finest".

On the week of May 3, 1975, this version was in its second of two weeks at the peak position number 20 on the US Hot 100, right in front of King's comeback hit "Supernatural Thing – Part I" at number 21. Both tunes fell off the top 40 the next week and off the chart the week after that. Lennon's version stayed on top 100 of the UK Singles Chart for seven weeks, peaking at number 30 on its fourth week on the week of May 18–24, 1975. It peaked at number 13 on Canada's RPM Top Singles chart on the week ending May 3, 1975 and stayed on the peak position the following week. It peaked at number 11 on the Official New Zealand Music Chart on the week of July 14, 1975.

The single's B-side track is "Move Over Ms. L", initially intended for Lennon's previous album Walls and Bridges but was cut from the final lineup due to his dissatisfaction with his early takes. Keith Moon covered "Move Over Ms. L" for his 1975 solo album Two Sides of the Moon.

Before the parent album's official release, during Lennon's March 1974 sessions with Harry Nilsson for Nilsson's album Pussy Cats, Lennon recorded two takes of the song in collaboration with former Beatles member Paul McCartney. McCartney performed on the drums; Lennon on guitar. The unreleased recordings would eventually be included in a bootleg album A Toot and a Snore in '74.

Billboard regarded Lennon's version as "the best version since the original." Pitchfork writer Marc Hogan found Lennon's version "more affecting (just barely)" than the original due to the "acoustic guitar and Lennon's fervent vocals". A 2007 book The Words and Music of John Lennon by Ben Urish and Ken Bielen called Lennon's version one of the "stronger" tracks of the album. Journalist and book author Robert Webb in 2013 called this version one of the "greatest cover versions".

=== Personnel ===
Personnel per John Lennon Website

- John Lennon – vocals, acoustic guitar
- Jesse Ed Davis, Peter Jameson – electric guitar
- Eddie Mottau – acoustic guitar
- Ken Ascher – piano
- Klaus Voormann – bass guitar
- Joseph Temperly, Frank Vicari – saxophone
- Dennis Morouse – tenor saxophone
- Jim Keltner – drums
- Arthur Jenkins – percussion

Chart (1975)	Peak position
Austria (Ö3 Austria Top 40)	19
Canada Top Singles (RPM)	13
German Singles Chart	22
New Zealand (Recorded Music NZ)	11
US Billboard Hot 100	20
US Cashbox Top 100	20
UK Singles (Official Charts)	30

== Mickey Gilley version ==
"Stand by Me"

Single by Mickey Gilley

from the album Urban Cowboy: Original Motion Picture Soundtrack
- B-side: "Cotton-Eyed Joe" by the Unstrung Heroes "Here Comes the Hurt Again" (UK)
- Released: May 31, 1980
- Recorded: 1980
- Length: 3:35
- Label: Epic
- Producer: Jim Ed Norman

Mickey Gilley singles chronology
"True Love Ways" (1980)	"Stand by Me" (1980)	"That's All That Matters" (1980)

Mickey Gilley released his version of the song in 1980, and it was included in the movie Urban Cowboy. It was his eighth No. 1 on the US country charts and also reached No. 22 on the US Hot 100. This version also peaked at No. 3 in Canadian RPM Country Singles in September 1980 and No. 51 in RPM Top Singles the following month. The song would "become one of Gilley's signature songs".

Chart (1980)	Peak position
US Hot Country Songs (Billboard)	1
US Billboard Hot 100	22
US Adult Contemporary (Billboard)	3
Canada Country Singles (RPM)	3
Canada Top Singles (RPM)	51

== Playing for Change version ==
External videos
- Official music video via verified Playing for Change channel on YouTube

Documentary filmmaker Mark Johnson, who had created the Playing for Change project, witnessed street performer Roger Ridley singing "Stand by Me" in Santa Monica, California, in March 2005. Ridley died eight months later.

Johnson was inspired to film Ridley's performance and another thirty-six musicians' individual performances of the song "around the world" and then mix the clips into one music video. The music video was featured in an October 2008 episode of Bill Moyers Journal, where Johnson was promoting the documentary film Playing for Change: Peace Through Music, which includes the music video and was shown as part of the 2008 Tribeca Film Festival in New York City. The music video was uploaded via the Playing for Change YouTube channel in November 2008, garnering more than 10 million views in May 2009. The total amount of views of the YouTube video increased to more than 24 million in December 2010, 30 million in March 2011, 40 million in March 2012, 50 million in some time between 2012 and 2014, 60 million in 2014, 74 million in May 2015, 100 million in 2017, 140 (or 142) million in March 2020, and 190 million in November 2023.

The musicians' performance of the song would be later included in their 2009 debut album Songs Around the World. The debut album has nine other tracks, comes with the seven-track bonus DVD, and sold about 26,000 units on its first week, 85% of sales from online sales and "nontraditional retail stores (including Starbucks locations)" and 25% from outside the United States.

== Prince Royce version ==
"Stand by Me"

Single by Prince Royce

from the album Prince Royce
- Released: January 19, 2010
- Recorded: 2009
- Genre: Bachata
- Length: 3:25
- Label: Top Stop Music
- Producers: Sergio George, Eduardo Aguilar

Prince Royce singles chronology
"Stand by Me" (2010)	"Corazón Sin Cara" (2010)

Music video
- "Stand by Me" on YouTube

Prince Royce recorded a bachata version of the song as his debut single, changing parts of the lyrics into Spanish. This version peaked number eight on US Hot Latin Tracks and number one on US Tropical Airplay. At the Latin Grammy Awards of 2010, Royce performed the song live along with Ben E. King. Royce's remake received a Lo Nuestro award for "Tropical Song of the Year".

Royce performed the song live again at a July 2016 Philips Arena concert in Atlanta, Georgia, alongside a male fan, at a 2017 Amway Center concert in Orlando, Florida, as the second song for the 2019 RodeoHouston concert, and at the third night of the 2020 Democratic National Convention. He also made a dance version for his debut album.

Weekly charts
Chart (2010)	Peak position
US Bubbling Under Hot 100 (Billboard)	9
US Hot Latin Songs (Billboard)	8
US Heatseekers Songs (Billboard)	15
US Latin Pop Airplay (Billboard)	9
US Tropical Airplay (Billboard)	1

Year-end charts
Chart (2010)	Position
US Hot Latin Songs (Billboard)	16
US Latin Pop Songs (Billboard)	25

=== Certifications ===
Region	Certification	Certified units/sales
Canada (Music Canada)	Gold	40,000^{‡}
Spain (Promusicae)	Gold	50,000^{‡}
United States (RIAA)	24× Platinum (Latin)	1,440,000^{‡}
^{‡} Sales+streaming figures based on certification alone.

== Other notable versions ==
=== 1960s and 1970s ===
Adriano Celentano recorded an Italian version of the song in 1962 titled "Pregherò". It topped the Italian charts on the week ending February 2, 1963, according to the "Billboard Hits of the World" section.

Muhammad Ali (as Cassius Clay) released a version as a single in 1964, charting on the Billboard "Bubbling Under Hot 100 Singles". Decades later, his cover would be included as a bonus track on re-releases of his 1963 spoken-word/comedy album I Am the Greatest.

External audio
- "Stand by Me" by Otis Redding on YouTube

Kenny Lynch's 1964 version stayed on the top 100 UK Singles Chart for seven weeks, peaking at number 39 on the week of May 7–13, 1964, its fourth week. Spyder Turner's 1967 version climbed to number 3 on the US Billboard Black Singles chart, number 12 on the Billboard Hot 100 chart, and number 10 in Canada.

David and Jimmy Ruffin (credited as the Ruffin Brothers) remade the song for their only collaborative album I Am My Brother's Keeper (1970). Released as a single, the version stayed at its peak position number 61 on Billboard Hot 100 for two weeks on the weeks ending November 28 (its sixth week) and December 5, 1970 (seventh week). It also peaked at number 24 on Billboard Soul Singles on the week ending November 21, 1970, its fourth week.

=== 1980s ===
External media

Audio
- "Stand by Me" by Maurice White on YouTube (the band Earth, Wind & Fire is credited)

Video
- "Stand by Me" by Julian Lennon on YouTube
- "Stand by Me" by Anita Mui (Cantonese) on YouTube

Maurice White's 1985 cover from his album Maurice White reached No. 6 on the US Billboard Hot R&B/Hip-Hop Singles chart and No. 11 on the US Billboard Adult Contemporary Songs chart. White's version also topped at No. 5 on the RPM Canadian Adult Contemporary Songs chart and No. 8 on the New Zealand Singles chart.

U2 performed the song with Bruce Springsteen at the John F. Kennedy Stadium (Philadelphia) concert on September 25, 1987, during the Joshua Tree Tour.

Anita Mui recorded the Cantonese version for her 1987 Cantonese album Mung Leui Gung Tseui. In 1988, Mui's version was awarded as one of top ten gold songs by Hong Kong telecommunication stations RTHK and by TVB. After Mui's death in 2003, Hong Kong singers and actors Miriam Yeung, Denise Ho, Alex To, Edmond Leung, band members of Grasshopper, Andy Hui, and William So performed Mui's version at Anita Mui. 10. Memory. Music. Gather. (梅艷芳。10。思念。音樂。會), the December 30, 2013, tribute concert for Mui.

In 1989, skate punk band Pennywise covered the song as the final track of their EP Wildcard. Los Angeles Times reviewer Lorraine Ali described the rendition as "joking". Trouser Press reviewer Jack Rabid described it as "silly, sped-up".

=== 1990s and 2000s ===
In a 1995 music video entitled Disney's Timon & Pumbaa in "Stand by Me", Timon, voiced by Nathan Lane, performs the song with slightly altered lyrics. Whenever Timon sings the chorus, Pumbaa survives physical mishaps and ferocious creatures. A trio of frogs voiced by Phillip Ingram then finish the song at the end. The music video was theatrically released in December 1995 as the preceding feature to the 1995 film Tom and Huck.

A version of the song was released by American R&B group 4 the Cause as their debut single in 1998. It was a number-one hit in Switzerland, reached number two of the Austrian and German singles charts and number three in New Zealand, and was a top-ten hit in several other countries.

In May 2007 American singer and rapper Sean Kingston remade and sampled the song, calling it "Beautiful Girls" for Kingston's eponymous debut album. "Beautiful Girls" went on to be a smash hit and Kingston's signature song.

=== 2010s ===
Tracy Chapman performed the song live in 2015 in the final season of Late Show with David Letterman at Letterman's request. The critical and popular response was very positive, with James Christopher Monger of AllMusic praising Chapman's "emotionally pitch-perfect, spotlight-stealing rendition" of the song. Monger further said:

With just her voice and an electric guitar, she managed to simultaneously bring the house down and build it back up again, which is no small feat, even for an artist who has proven herself time and again to be a powerful yet always benevolent force of nature.

A recording of that live performance was released as the final track of Chapman's Greatest Hits the same year.

"Stand by Me"

Single by Florence and the Machine

from the album Songs from Final Fantasy XV
- Released: August 12, 2016
- Length: 4:05
- Label: Island
- Producer: Benjamin Nelson

Florence and the Machine singles chronology
"Wish That You Were Here" (2016)	"Stand by Me" (2016)	"Sky Full of Song" (2018)

Audio
- "Stand by Me" by Florence + The Machine on YouTube

Florence and the Machine recorded the song for the soundtrack and trailer of Final Fantasy XV in 2016. The band released its EP Songs from Final Fantasy XV on August 12, containing the band's remake. The cover peaked at number fifteen on the Billboard Hot Rock Singles in December.

External videos
- "Stand by Me" by Skylar Grey on YouTube
- "Stand by Me" by Karen Gibson and The Kingdom Choir at the Royal Wedding (BBC) on YouTube

Skylar Grey recorded the song which appeared for a Budweiser commercial for Super Bowl LII, with proceeds for the song to go to the American Red Cross.

The Kingdom Choir performed the song at the wedding of Prince Harry and Meghan Markle on May 19, 2018. Their version debuted and peaked at number one on the Billboard Hot Gospel Songs chart on the week ending June 2, 2018. It also entered the UK Singles Chart and peaked at number 94 on its first and only week, the week of May 25–31, 2018. It is included in their debut album, Stand by Me, released later that year.

In 2018 it was performed by Maria José, former member of the band Kabah.

=== 2020s ===
External videos
- Snoop Dogg performing the song via Instagram
- "Stand by Me" (from Live at the Print Shop) by Stephen Wilson Jr. on YouTube

On October 24, 2021, Snoop Dogg performed the song alongside the audience at a Big Night Live concert in Boston as a tribute to his mother Beverly Tate, who died at age 70 earlier on the same night.

Singer-songwriter Stephen Wilson Jr. performed a version of the song live in memory of his late father. The performance was recorded for a Live at the Print Shop release. Joseph Hudak of Rolling Stone noted the audience's "remarkable" response to Wilson's playing of his "slashing acoustic guitar" and "the raspy moan of his voice". A viral video of his live performance received over twenty million views by late December 2024. The performance video on YouTube was viewed over 5.7 million times by mid-November 2025.

The English rock band Def Leppard released a cover of the song on February 10, 2025, with all proceeds being donated to FireAid.

=== Charts ===
==== Maurice White ====
Chart (1985)	Peak position
US Hot R&B/Hip-Hop Songs (Billboard)	6
New Zealand (Recorded Music NZ)	8
Canada RPM Adult Contemporary	5
US Adult Contemporary (Billboard)	11
Netherlands (Single Top 100)	38
US Billboard Hot 100	50

==== 4 the Cause ====
Weekly charts
Chart (1998)	Peak position
Australia (ARIA)	28
Austria (Ö3 Austria Top 40)	2
Belgium (Ultratip Bubbling Under Flanders)	4
Belgium (Ultratop 50 Wallonia)	6
Canada Dance/Urban (RPM)	18
Denmark (IFPI)	8
Europe (Eurochart Hot 100)	4
Europe Border Breakers (Music & Media)	20
France (SNEP)	14
Germany (GfK)	2
Iceland (Íslenski Listinn Topp 40)	10
Ireland (IRMA)	2
Netherlands (Dutch Top 40)	6
Netherlands (Single Top 100)	6
New Zealand (Recorded Music NZ)	3
Scottish Singles Sales (Official Charts)	12
Spain (AFYVE)	4
Sweden (Sverigetopplistan)	6
Switzerland (Schweizer Hitparade)	1
UK Singles (Official Charts)	12
US Billboard Hot 100	82

Year-end charts
Chart (1998)	Position
Austria (Ö3 Austria Top 40)	8
Belgium (Ultratop 50 Wallonia)	33
Europe (Eurochart Hot 100)	19
France (SNEP)	70
Germany (Media Control)	7
Netherlands (Dutch Top 40)	27
Netherlands (Single Top 100)	36
New Zealand (RIANZ)	28
Sweden (Hitlistan)	33
Switzerland (Schweizer Hitparade)	10

===== Certifications (4 the Cause) =====
Region	Certification	Certified units/sales
Belgium (BRMA)	Gold	25,000^{*}
Germany (BVMI)	Platinum	500,000^{^}
Sweden (GLF)	Gold	15,000^{^}
Switzerland (IFPI Switzerland)	Gold	25,000^{^}
^{*} Sales figures based on certification alone.^{^} Shipments figures based on certification alone.

==== Florence + the Machine ====
Weekly charts
Chart (2016)	Peak position
Belgium (Ultratop 50 Flanders)	2
Belgium (Ultratip Bubbling Under Wallonia)	23
Belgium Digital Songs (Billboard)	1
France (SNEP)	162
Israel (Media Forest)	5
US Hot Rock & Alternative Songs (Billboard)	15

Year-end charts
Chart (2016)	Position
Belgium (Ultratop 50 Flanders)	65

==== The Kingdom Choir ====
Weekly charts
Chart (2018)	Position
US Billboard Hot Gospel Songs	1
UK Singles (Official Charts)	94

== See also ==
- List of number-one R&B singles of 1961 (U.S.)
- List of UK Singles Chart number ones
- List of number-one singles of 1987 (Ireland)
- List of number-one Billboard Hot Tropical Songs of 2010
