= Don't Play That Song! =

Studio album by Ben E. King
- Released: August 20, 1962
- Recorded: 1960–1961
- Genre: Soul
- Length: 29:43
- Label: Atco
- Producer: Ahmet Ertegün, Jerry Leiber, Mike Stoller

Ben E. King chronology
Ben E. King Sings for Soulful Lovers (1962)	Don't Play That Song! (1962)	Young Boy Blues (1964)

Singles from Don't Play That Song!
- 1. "First Taste of Love" Released: 1961; 2. "Stand By Me" Released: 1961; 3. "Young Boy Blues" / "Here Comes the Night" Released: 1961; 4. "Ecstasy" Released: 1962; 5. "Don't Play That Song (You Lied)" Released: 1962

Professional ratings
Review scores
Source	Rating
New Record Mirror	4/5 stars

Don't Play That Song! is the third studio album by Ben E. King. The album was released by Atlantic Records as an LP in 1962 and was home to five notable singles: "Stand by Me", "Ecstasy", "First Taste of Love", "Here Comes the Night", and the title track, "Don't Play That Song (You Lied)".Although not major hits, the four Doc Pomus co-written songs all reached the Billboard Hot 100 in 1961 and/or 1962: Ecstasy (1962 Billboard 56 Cashbox 50), First Taste Of Love (1961 Billboard 53 Cashbox 91 UK 27 Canada 15), Here Comes The Night (1961 Billboard 81) and Young Boy Blues (1961 Billboard 66 Cashbox 86 UK 27 Canada 15).

== Track listing ==
1. "Don't Play That Song (You Lied)" (Ahmet Ertegün, Betty Nelson) – 2:58
2. "Ecstasy" (Doc Pomus, Phil Spector) – 2:32
3. "On the Horizon" (Jerry Leiber, Mike Stoller) – 2:18
4. "Show Me the Way" (Gerry Goffin, Carole King) – 2:18
5. "Here Comes the Night" (Doc Pomus, Mort Shuman) – 2:24
6. "First Taste of Love" (Doc Pomus, Mort Shuman) – 2:20
7. "Stand by Me" (Ben E. King, Jerry Leiber, Mike Stoller) – 3:00
8. "Yes" (Jerry Leiber, Mike Stoller) – 3:03
9. "Young Boy Blues" (Doc Pomus, Phil Spector) – 2:17
10. "The Hermit of Misty Mountain" (Ruth Batchelor, Bob Roberts) – 2:20
11. "I Promise Love" (Ben E. King, Lover Patterson) – 2:05
12. "Brace Yourself" (Otis Blackwell) – 2:08

== Personnel ==
- Stan Applebaum - arrangements
- Jimmie Haskell - arrangement on "Don't Play That Song (You Lied)"
- Claus Ogerman - arrangement on "The Hermit of Misty Mountain"

Technical

- Loring Eutemey - cover design
- Maurice Seymour - cover photography

== Charts ==
Chart performance for Don't Play That Song!
Chart (2023)	Peak position
Hungarian Albums (MAHASZ)	31
