= Ben E. King =

American singer (1938–2015)

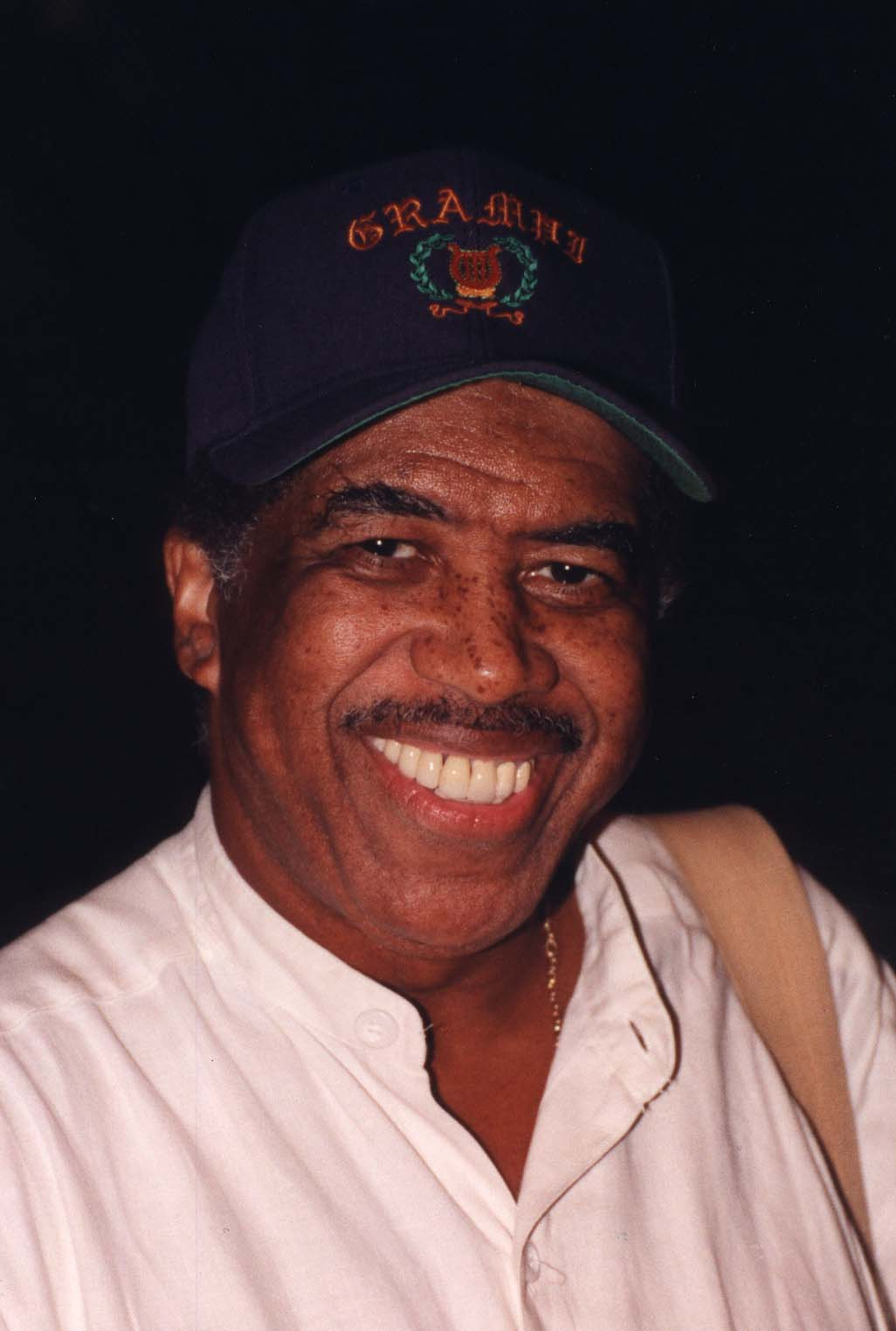
- King in the 1990s

Background information
- Born: Benjamin Earl Nelson; September 28, 1938; Henderson, North Carolina, U.S.
- Origin: Harlem, New York, US
- Died: April 30, 2015 (aged 76) Hackensack, New Jersey, U.S.
- Genres: Soul; R&B; doo-wop
- Occupations: Singer; songwriter; record producer
- Instruments: Vocals; piano
- Years active: 1958–2015
- Labels: Atco; Atlantic; Ichiban
- Formerly of: The Drifters
- Website: beneking.info'

Benjamin Earl King (né Nelson; September 28, 1938 – April 30, 2015) was an American soul and R&B singer and songwriter. He rose to prominence as one of the principal lead singers of the R&B vocal group the Drifters, singing the lead vocals on three of their biggest hit singles: "There Goes My Baby", "This Magic Moment", and "Save the Last Dance for Me" (their only US number one hit).

As a soloist, King is best known as the singer and co-composer of "Stand by Me", which became a US top-10 hit, both in 1961 and later in 1986 (when it was used as the theme to the film of the same name), and a number-one hit in the United Kingdom the following year. The single was also placed on the RIAA's list of Songs of the Century. His 1975 single "Supernatural Thing" became a top-five hit on the Billboard Hot 100. King was also the original recording artist of songs such as "Spanish Harlem", "I (Who Have Nothing)", "So Much Love", "Don't Play That Song (You Lied)", "We're Gonna Groove", and "Till I Can't Take It Anymore", all of which have been covered by multiple artists to varying degrees of success.

King was inducted into the Rock and Roll Hall of Fame in 1988, as a member of the Drifters, and has been nominated as a solo artist. Along with the Drifters' "There Goes My Baby", King's songs "Stand by Me" and "Spanish Harlem" also appeared on the Rock and Roll Hall of Fame's list of 500 Songs That Shaped Rock and Roll. He was inducted alongside the Drifters into the Vocal Group Hall of Fame in 2000, as well as the Songwriters Hall of Fame in 2012 with the Towering song award.

== Early life ==
Benjamin Earl Nelson was born on September 29, 1938, in Henderson, North Carolina, but moved to Harlem, New York, at age nine in 1947. He began singing in church choirs, and in high school formed the Four B's, a doo-wop group that occasionally performed at the Apollo Theater.

== Career ==
=== The Drifters ===
In 1958, King (still using his birth name) joined a doo-wop group called the Five Crowns. Later that year, the Drifters' manager George Treadwell fired the members of the original Drifters, and replaced them with the members of the Five Crowns.

King had a string of R&B hits with the group on Atlantic Records. He co-wrote and sang lead on the first Atlantic hit by the new version of the Drifters, "There Goes My Baby" (1959). King sang lead on a succession of hits by the team of Doc Pomus and Mort Shuman, including "Save the Last Dance for Me", "This Magic Moment", and "I Count the Tears". He recorded only 13 songs with the Drifters—two backing other lead singers and 11 lead vocal performances—including an unreleased song called "Temptation" (later redone by Drifters vocalist Johnny Moore). The last of the King-led Drifters singles to be released was "Sometimes I Wonder", which was recorded on May 19, 1960, but not issued until June 1962.

After a year of touring with the Drifters, contract disputes arose with Treadwell, in which King and his manager Lover Patterson demanded greater compensation. Treadwell refused, and King was only hired for studio recordings. On television, fellow Drifters member Charlie Thomas usually lip-synched the songs that King had recorded with the Drifters.

=== Solo career ===
In May 1960, King left the Drifters, assuming the stage name Ben E. King in preparation for a solo career. Remaining with Atlantic Records on its Atco imprint, his first release, "Show Me the Way"/"Brace Yourself" failed to hit the charts. His second effort, "A Help-Each-Other"/"How Often", with Lavern Baker, was not a hit either. King’s first charting single was "First Taste of Love". It peaked on the US Billboard at number 53, but it became a bigger hit in the UK, charting at number 27. His first Top 10 release as a solo artist was "Spanish Harlem" (1961), written by Jerry Leiber and Phil Spector and produced by Leiber and Mike Stoller. It peaked on the US pop charts at number 10, and on Billboard's R&B chart at number 15.

King's next single, "Stand by Me", written with Leiber and Stoller, ultimately would be voted as one of the Songs of the Century by the Recording Industry Association of America. King cited singers Brook Benton, Roy Hamilton, and Sam Cooke as influences for his vocals of the song. "Stand by Me", "There Goes My Baby", "Spanish Harlem", and "Save the Last Dance for Me" were all named in the Rock and Roll Hall of Fame's 500 Songs that Shaped Rock and Roll; and each of those records has earned a Grammy Hall of Fame Award. King's other well-known songs include "Don't Play That Song (You Lied)", "Amor", "Seven Letters", "How Can I Forget", "I Swear by Stars Above", "It Ain't Fair", "Young Boy Blues", "It's All Over", "River of Tears", "Ecstasy", "She's Gone Again", "That's When It Hurts", and "On the Horizon". In the summer of 1963, King had a Top 30 hit with "I (Who Have Nothing)", which reached the Top 10 on New York's radio station, WMCA.

King's records continued to place well on the Billboard Hot 100 chart until the mid-1960s. British pop bands began to dominate the pop music scene, but King still continued to make R&B hits. Some of these hits include "What is Soul?", "Tears, Tears, Tears", and "Till I Can't Take It Anymore". In 1975, King made a comeback on the Billboard Hot 100 chart with the disco hit "Supernatural Thing": number 5 on Billboard Hot 100 and number 1 on the Billboard R&B chart. It was also nominated for a Grammy at the 18th Annual Grammy Awards in 1975 for "best R&B vocal performance, male". In 1977, King collaborated with Average White Band in releasing the album Benny & Us. The album spawned two top 40 R&B hits, "A Star in the Ghetto" and "Get It Up".

King returned to the Drifters in late 1982 in the United Kingdom and sang with them until the group's break-up and reorganization in 1986. From 1983 until the band's break-up, the other members of this incarnation of the Drifters were Johnny Moore, Joe Blunt, and Clyde Brown.

A 1986 re-issue of "Stand by Me" followed the song's use as the theme song to the movie Stand By Me and re-entered the Billboard top ten after a 25-year absence. This reissue also topped the charts in the United Kingdom and the Republic of Ireland for three weeks in February 1987. The reissue also made King the first act to reach the Hot 100's top 10 in the 1950s, 1960s, 1970s, and 1980s, either as a member of an act that reached that high (in this case, the Drifters) or as a solo act that did.

In 1990, King and Bo Diddley, along with Doug Lazy, recorded a revamped hip hop version of the Monotones' 1958 hit song "Book of Love" for the soundtrack of the movie Book of Love. He also recorded a children's album, I Have Songs In My Pocket, written and produced by children's music artist Bobby Susser in 1998, which won the Early Childhood News Directors' Choice Award and Dr. Toy's/the Institute for Childhood Resources Award. King performed "Stand by Me" on the Late Show with David Letterman in 2007. Ahmet Ertegun said, "King is one of the greatest singers in the history of rock and roll and rhythm and blues."

As both a member of the Drifters and a solo artist, King earned several number‑one hits, including "There Goes My Baby", "Save the Last Dance for Me", "Stand By Me", "Supernatural Thing", and the 1986 reissue of "Stand By Me". Across the combined U.S. pop and R&B charts, he amassed 12 Top 10 singles and 28 Top 40 entries. King was inducted into the Rock and Roll Hall of Fame as a member of the Drifters and later received a nomination for his solo work as well.

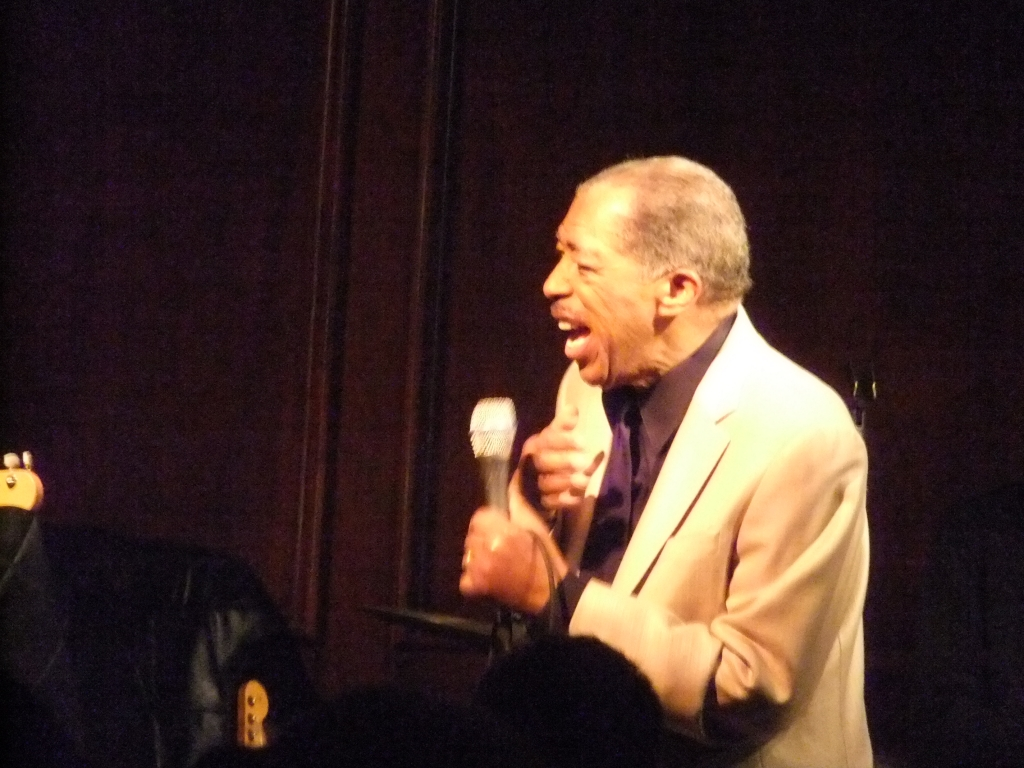
King performing at Scullers Jazz Club in Boston, Massachusetts, on March 31, 2012

A re-recording of King's "I (Who Have Nothing)" was selected for the Sopranos Peppers and Eggs Soundtrack CD (2001).

King was inducted into the North Carolina Music Hall of Fame in 2009. On March 27, 2012, the Songwriters Hall of Fame announced that "Stand By Me" would receive its 2012 Towering Song Award and that King would be honored with the 2012 Towering Performance Award for his recording of the song.

== Later life ==
King was active in his charitable foundation, the Stand By Me Foundation, which helps to provide education to deserving youths. King was a resident of Teaneck, New Jersey, from the late 1960s onwards.

King performed "Stand by Me" during a televised tribute to late comedian George Carlin, as he was one of Carlin's favorite artists. On November 11, 2010, King performed "Stand by Me" at the Latin Grammys with Prince Royce.

King toured the United Kingdom in 2013 and played concerts in the United States as late as 2014, despite reported health problems.

Following a brief illness, King died at Hackensack University Medical Center on April 30, 2015; he was 76 years old. King was married to his wife Betty, for 50 years, and had three children: Terris Cannon, Benjamin King Jr., and Angela Matos, in addition to six grandchildren.

== Legacy ==
King has been covered by acts from several genres, reflecting the wide reach of both his solo work and his earlier recordings with the Drifters. His Drifters‑era hits — including "There Goes My Baby," "Dance with Me," "Save the Last Dance for Me," "I Count the Tears," and "This Magic Moment" — became foundational R&B standards and have been interpreted by artists across multiple generations, underscoring the lasting impact of his early vocal work. His solo catalog has been equally influential: "So Much Love" was recorded by Dusty Springfield and many others, while "I (Who Have Nothing)" was performed by Shirley Bassey in 1963, Tom Jones in 1970, and later by Sylvester in 1979. "Till I Can't Take It Anymore" was revisited by Ray Charles in 1970, and "Spanish Harlem" was memorably interpreted by Aretha Franklin in 1971. Franklin also delivered one of the most celebrated versions of King's "Don't Play That Song (You Lied)," a tune later revisited by artists such as Adriano Celentano, Mariah Carey, and Bruce Springsteen, further underscoring its enduring appeal. King's signature solo hit "Stand by Me" has inspired an especially wide range of covers, recorded by Otis Redding, John Lennon, Mickey Gilley, Seal, Florence and the Machine, and Tracy Chapman, and it forms the basis of the Indian hit "Dildaara" by Vishal–Shekhar. His influence also extended into rock: Siouxsie and the Banshees recorded "Supernatural Thing" in 1981, and Led Zeppelin covered "Groovin’" (better known as "We're Gonna Groove"). Together, these reinterpretations — spanning soul, pop, rock, reggae, and beyond — highlight the remarkable breadth of King’s artistic legacy and the enduring appeal of the songs he helped define.

== Discography ==
=== Studio albums ===
Title	Year	Peak chart positions		
Title	Year	US	US R&B	UK
Spanish Harlem	1961	—	—	30
Ben E. King Sings for Soulful Lovers	1962	—	—	—
Don't Play That Song!	1962	—	—	—
Young Boy Blues	1964	—	—	—
Seven Letters	1965	—	—	—
What Is Soul	1967	—	—	—
Rough Edges	1970	—	—	—
The Beginning of It All	1972	—	—	—
Supernatural	1975	39	13	—
I Had a Love	1976	—	—	—
Benny And Us (with Average White Band)	1977	33	14	—
Let Me Live in Your Life	1978	—	—	—
Music Trance	1980	—	73	—
Street Tough	1981	—	—	—
Save the Last Dance for Me	1987	—	—	—
What's Important to Me	1991	—	82	—
Shades of Blue	1993	—	—	—
I Have Songs In My Pocket	1998	—	—	—
I've Been Around	2006	—	—	—
White Christmas	2008	—	—	—
Heart & Soul	2010	—	—	—
"—" denotes releases that did not chart.

=== Live album ===
Title	Year	Peak chart positions	
Title	Year	US	US R&B
Person to Person: Live at the Blue Note	2003	—	30

=== Compilation albums ===
Title	Year	Peak chart positions				
Title	Year	US	US R&B	GER	SWI	UK
Ben E. King's Greatest Hits	1964	—	—	—	—	—
Stand by Me: The Ultimate Collection	1987	—	—	35	18	14
The Very Best of Ben E. King and the Drifters (with the Drifters)	1990	—	—	—	—	15
Anthology	1993	—	—	—	—	—
The Very Best of Ben E. King	1998	—	—	—	—	—
Eleven Best	2001	—	—	—	—	—
Soul Masters	2005	—	—	—	—	—
Love Is Gonna Get You	2007	—	—	—	—	—
"—" denotes releases that did not chart.

=== Singles ===
==== As lead of The Drifters ====
Title	Year	Peak chart positions							
Title	Year	US	US R&B	BEL (FL)	BEL (WA)	GER	NL	NOR	UK
"There Goes My Baby"	1959	2	1	—	—	—	—	—	—
"Dance with Me"	1959	15	2	—	—	—	—	—	17
"This Magic Moment"	1960	16	4	—	—	—	—	—	—
"Lonely Winds"	1960	54	9	—	—	—	—	—	—
"Save the Last Dance for Me"	1960	1	1	2	2	2	1	3	2
"I Count the Tears"	1960	17	6	—	—	—	—	—	28
"Sometimes I Wonder"	1962	—	—	—	—	—	—	—	—
"—" denotes releases that did not chart.

==== As a solo artist ====
Title	Year	Peak chart positions										Certifications
Title	Year	US	US R&B	BEL (FL)	BEL (WA)	GER	NL	NOR	NZ	SWI	UK	Certifications
"Show Me the Way"	1960	—	—	—	—	—	—	—	—	—	—	
"A Help-Each-Other Romance" (with LaVern Baker)	1960	—	—	—	—	—	—	—	—	—	—	
"First Taste of Love"	1960	53	—	—	—	—	—	—	—	—	27	
"Spanish Harlem" (original or 1987 reissue)	1960	10	15	—	—	—	—	—	—	—	92	
"Stand by Me" (original or 1986 reissue)	1961	4	1	4	46	2	11	9	45	3	1	BPI: 3× Platinum; RMNZ: 4× Platinum
"Amor"	1961	18	10	—	17	—	—	—	—	—	38	
"Here Comes the Night"	1961	81	—	—	—	—	—	—	—	—	—	
"Young Boy Blues"	1961	66	—	—	—	—	—	—	—	—	—	
"Ecstasy"	1962	56	—	—	—	—	—	—	—	—	—	
"Don't Play That Song (You Lied)"	1962	11	2	—	11	—	—	—	—	—	—	
"Too Bad"	1962	88	—	—	—	—	—	—	—	—	—	
"I'm Standing By"	1962	111	—	—	—	—	—	—	—	—	—	
"Tell Daddy"	1962	122	29	—	—	—	—	—	—	—	—	
"How Can I Forget"	1963	85	23	—	—	—	—	—	—	—	—	
"I (Who Have Nothing)"	1963	29	16	—	—	—	—	—	—	—	—	
"I Could Have Danced All Night"	1963	72	—	—	—	—	—	—	—	—	—	
"What Now My Love"	1964	102	—	—	—	—	—	—	—	—	—	
"That's When It Hurts"	1964	63	17	—	—	—	—	—	—	—	—	
"Amore Quando"	1964	—	—	—	—	—	—	—	—	—	—	
"What Can a Man Do"	1964	113	39	—	—	—	—	—	—	—	—	
"It's All Over"	1964	72	40	—	—	—	—	—	—	—	—	
"Seven Letters"	1964	45	11	—	—	—	—	—	—	—	—	
"The Record (Baby I Love You)"	1965	84	24	—	—	—	—	—	—	—	—	
"She's Gone Again"	1965	128	—	—	—	—	—	—	—	—	—	
"Cry No More"	1965	—	—	—	—	—	—	—	—	—	—	
"Goodnight My Love"	1965	91	—	—	—	—	—	—	—	—	—	
"So Much Love"	1966	96	—	—	—	—	—	—	—	—	—	
"I Swear by Stars Above"	1966	—	35	—	—	—	—	—	—	—	—	
"What Is Soul?"	1966	—	38	—	—	—	—	—	—	—	—	
"Tears, Tears, Tears"	1967	93	34	—	—	—	—	—	—	—	—	
"Katherine"	1967	—	—	—	—	—	—	—	—	—	—	
"Don't Take Your Sweet Love Away"	1967	—	—	—	—	—	—	—	—	—	—	
"We Got a Thing Goin' On" (with Dee Dee Sharp)	1968	127	—	—	—	—	—	—	—	—	—	
"Don't Take Your Love from Me"	1968	117	44	—	—	—	—	—	—	—	—	
"Soul Meeting" (as part of the Soul Clan)	1968	91	37	—	—	—	—	—	—	—	—	
"It's Amazing"	1968	—	—	—	—	—	—	—	—	—	—	
Till I Can't Take It Anymore	1968	134	37	—	—	—	—	—	—	—	—	
"Hey Little One"	1969	—	—	—	—	—	—	—	—	—	—	
"I Can't Take It Like a Man"	1969	—	45	—	—	—	—	—	—	—	—	
"In the Midnight Hour/Lay Lady Lay"	1970	—	—	—	—	—	—	—	—	—	—	
"Take Me to the Pilot"	1972	—	—	—	—	—	—	—	—	—	—	
"Into the Mystic"	1972	—	—	—	—	—	—	—	—	—	—	
"Spread Myself Around"	1973	—	—	—	—	—	—	—	—	—	—	
"Supernatural Thing"	1975	5	1	—	—	49	—	—	—	—	—	
"Do It in the Name of Love"	1975	60	4	—	—	—	—	—	—	—	—	
"I Had a Love"	1975	—	23	—	—	—	—	—	—	—	—	
"I Betcha Didn't Know That"	1976	—	—	—	—	—	—	—	—	—	—	
"Somebody's Knocking"	1976	—	—	—	—	—	—	—	—	—	—	
"Get It Up" (with Average White Band)	1977	—	21	—	—	—	—	—	39	—	—	
"A Star in the Ghetto" (with Average White Band)	1977	—	25	—	—	—	—	—	—	—	—	
"Tippin"	1978	—	—	—	—	—	—	—	—	—	—	
"Spoiled"	1978	—	—	—	—	—	—	—	—	—	—	
"Music Trance"	1980	—	29	—	—	—	—	—	—	—	—	
"Street Tough"	1981	—	—	—	—	—	—	—	—	—	—	
"Souvenirs of Love"	1981	—	—	—	—	—	—	—	—	—	—	
"Save the Last Dance for Me" (re-recording)	1987	—	—	—	—	60	—	—	—	—	69	
"What's Important to Me"	1991	—	—	—	—	—	—	—	—	—	—	
"You've Got All of Me"	1992	—	—	—	—	—	—	—	—	—	—	
"You Still Move Me"	1992	—	—	—	—	—	—	—	—	—	—	
"—" denotes releases that did not chart or was not released in that territory.

== See also ==
- List of people from Harlem
