= Spanish Harlem (song) =

1960 song by Ben E. King

Single by Ben E. King

from the album Spanish Harlem
- A-side: "First Taste of Love" (original 1960 release)
- B-side: "First Taste of Love" (later releases)
- Released: December 1960
- Genre: Soul
- Length: 2:53
- Label: Atco
- Songwriters: Jerry Leiber; Phil Spector
- Producer: Jerry Leiber and Mike Stoller

Ben E. King singles chronology
"How Often" (1960)	"Spanish Harlem" (1960)	"Stand By Me" (1961)

"Spanish Harlem" is a song recorded by Ben E. King in 1960 for Atco Records for his album of the same name. It was written by Jerry Leiber and Phil Spector and produced by Jerry Leiber and Mike Stoller. "Spanish Harlem" was King's first hit away from The Drifters, peaking at number 10 on the Billboard Hot 100 and number 15 on the rhythm and blues chart.

The song has been covered by a number of artists, including Aretha Franklin for her 1971 compilation Aretha's Greatest Hits, whose version reached number two on the Billboard Hot 100. The song was ranked number 358 on Rolling Stone's list of the "500 Greatest Songs of All Time".

== Background and recording ==
"Spanish Harlem" was written by Jerry Leiber and Phil Spector, drawing inspiration from Maurice Ravel's Rapsodie espagnole and Claude Debussy's Ibéria. Leiber later reflected, "I think that he learned a lot by just writing that song with me. By the choices that I made and what I told him to do, shade this and shade that, make this shorter and make that a shade longer, whatever." The main riff was conceived by Spector and his then-girlfriend Beverly Ross; she was reportedly shocked to discover the riff a few months later in the version sung by Ben E. King.

The arrangement was credited to Stan Applebaum, featuring Spanish guitar, marimba, drum beats, soprano saxophone, strings and a male chorus. King recorded the track during the same October 1960 session that yielded "Stand by Me". The composition incorporated a marimba motif of descending triplets, later added by Mike Stoller, which became central to the recording. Leiber credited Stoller with the arrangement in a 1968 interview; similarly, Leiber said in a 2009 radio interview with Leiber and Stoller on the Bob Edwards Weekend talk show that Stoller had written the key instrumental introduction to the record, although he was not credited. Stoller remarks in the team's autobiography Hound Dog that he had created this "fill" while doing a piano accompaniment when the song was presented to Ahmet Ertegun and Jerry Wexler at Atlantic Records, with Spector playing guitar and Leiber doing the vocal. "Since then, I've never heard the song played without that musical figure."

== Release ==
Initially released as a B-side to Spector's co-written "First Taste of Love", "Spanish Harlem" gained traction after radio stations favored it, reaching number 10 on the charts in early 1961. It became King's first hit away from the Drifters, a group he had led for several years. The track climbed the Billboard charts, peaking at number 10 on the Billboard Hot 100 and number 15 on the rhythm and blues chart. Though it was not a hit in the United Kingdom upon its initial release, it was re-released in 1987, after the re-release of "Stand By Me" became a number 1 hit on the UK singles chart.

== Dalida version ==
"Harlem spagnolo"

Single by Dalida

from the album Loin de moi
- A-side: "No Dico No"
- Released: 1961
- Recorded: 1961
- Genre: Soul
- Label: Barclay/Jolly
- Songwriters: Jerry Leiber Phil Spector Carlo Da Vinci
- Producer: Walter Guertler

Dalida singles chronology
"Dix Mille Bulles Leues" (1961)	"Harlem spagnolo" (1961)	"Quando dormirai" (1961)

In 1961, French singer Dalida performed a version in the Italian language, with lyrics by Carlo Da Vinci, on her album Loin de moi.

== Cliff Richard versions ==
Cliff Richard released his rendition on his 1962 album 32 Minutes and 17 Seconds. He also recorded a German version, titled "Das ist die Frage aller Fragen", with lyrics by Carl Ulrich Blecher, that was a number one hit in Germany and Austria in 1964, as well as a number one hit in Switzerland in 1965.

=== Charts ===
Chart (1962–64)	Peak position
Austria (Ö3 Austria Top 40)	1
Belgium (Ultratop 50 Wallonia)	28
West Germany (GfK)	1

== Aretha Franklin version ==
"Spanish Harlem"

Single by Aretha Franklin

from the album Aretha's Greatest Hits
- B-side: "Lean on Me"
- Released: July 9, 1971
- Recorded: 1971
- Genre: Soul
- Length: 3:30
- Label: Atlantic
- Songwriters: Jerry Leiber; Phil Spector
- Producers: Jerry Wexler, Arif Mardin, Tom Dowd

Aretha Franklin singles chronology
"A Brand New Me" (1971)	"Spanish Harlem" (1971)	"Rock Steady" (1971)

In July 1971, Aretha Franklin released a cover version of the song for her 1971 compilation Aretha's Greatest Hits that outperformed the original on the charts and in which Franklin changed the lyrics slightly: from "A red rose up in Spanish Harlem" to "There's a rose in Black 'n' Spanish Harlem. A rose in Black and Spanish Harlem.” Her version went to number one on the US soul charts for three weeks and number two on the Hot 100 for two weeks, barred from the top spot by "Go Away Little Girl" by Donny Osmond. This version also hit number six on Billboard's Easy Listening chart. Aretha Franklin's version earned a gold single for sales of over one million. Dr. John played keyboards on Franklin's version with Bernard "Pretty" Purdie on drums and Chuck Rainey on bass.

=== Charts ===
Chart (1971)	Peak position
Belgium (Ultratop 50 Flanders)	4
Belgium (Ultratop 50 Wallonia)	25
Canada Top Singles (RPM)	5
Netherlands (Single Top 100)	1
UK Singles (Official Charts)	14
US Adult Contemporary (Billboard)	6
US Best Selling Soul Singles (Billboard)	1
US Billboard Hot 100	2
West Germany (GfK)	6

== Laura Nyro version ==
On her 1971 covers album Gonna Take a Miracle, singer-songwriter Laura Nyro performed a version with backing vocals by the group Labelle.

== Other recordings ==
- Volume 2 - Herb Alpert's Tijuana Brass (1963)
- If You Can Believe Your Eyes and Ears - The Mamas & the Papas (1966)
- Up on the Roof: Songs from the Brill Building - Neil Diamond (1993)
- Bowling for Soup Goes to the Movies - Bowling for Soup (2005)
