= Don't Play That Song (You Lied) =

1962 single by Ben E. King

Single by Ben E. King

from the album Don't Play That Song!
- B-side: "The Hermit of Misty Mountain"
- Released: 1962
- Recorded: 1962
- Genre: Soul
- Length: 2:58
- Label: Atco
- Songwriters: Ahmet Ertegun; Betty Nelson

Ben E. King singles chronology
"Ecstasy" (1962)	"Don't Play That Song (You Lied)" (1962)	"Too Bad" (1962)

Bruce Springsteen singles chronology
"Nightshift" (2022)	"Don't Play That Song" (2022)	"Turn Back the Hands of Time" (2022)

"Don't Play That Song (You Lied)" is a song written by Ahmet Ertegun and Betty Nelson, the wife of soul singer Ben E. King. It was first recorded by King and was the title track on his third album Don't Play That Song! (1962). The song reached number 2 on the U.S. R&B singles chart and number 11 on the pop chart when released as a single on Atco Records in 1962. In Europe, it ranked at number 10 in Italy on FIMI National Charts between 1962 and 1963.

== Aretha Franklin version ==
Singer Aretha Franklin covered the song for her nineteenth studio album, Spirit in the Dark, released on Atlantic Records in 1970. Her version, performed with the Dixie Flyers, was released as a single in 1970 and peaked at number 1 for three weeks on the R&B singles chart and number 11 on the pop chart. Franklin's version was certified gold with sales of more than a million copies. It reached number 13 on the UK Singles Chart. Franklin's recording was the first of three songs originally recorded by King that she later interpreted. She followed it with “It Ain’t Fair” in 1970 and “Spanish Harlem” in 1971.

== Other versions ==
In 1962, the French singer Johnny Hallyday released a single with a French adaptation of the song under the title Pas Cette Chanson ! Other acts to have recorded or performed the song include Keith Locke and The Quests, Anthony & the Sophomores (1963, unreleased), Peppino di Capri, La Lupe in 1969, Adriano Celentano in 1977, and Mariah Carey. It was also performed to great acclaim on the first season of American Idol by Kelly Clarkson, the eventual winner. More recently Sam Moore duetted the song with Bekka Bramlett on his 2006 album Overnight Sensational. The British soul singer Beverley Knight included a cover of the song on her 2016 album Soulsville. Singer-songwriter Bruce Springsteen recorded the song for his 2022 studio album, Only the Strong Survive.
