= Solomon Burke discography =

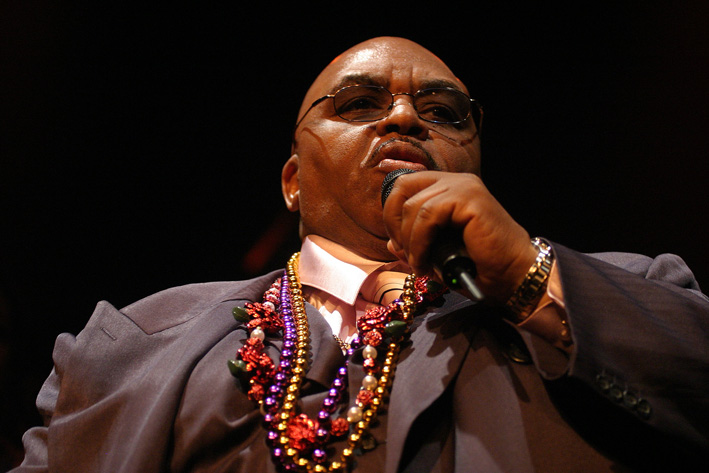
Solomon Burke

The following list is the discography of the American soul musician Solomon Burke.

== Studio albums ==
- Solomon Burke – 1962 (Apollo 498) Reissued 1964 (Kenwood KLP-498) Reissued 2000 (P-Vine)
- If You Need Me – 1963 (Atlantic 8085)
- I Almost Lost My Mind – 1964 (Clarion 607)
- Rock 'N Soul – 1964 (Atlantic 8096)
- King Solomon – 1968 (Atlantic 8158)
- I Wish I Knew – 1968 (Atlantic 8185)
- Proud Mary – 1969 (Bell 6033) (#140 Pop, chart run – 4 weeks)
- The Electronic Magnetism (also known as King Heavy) – 1971 (MGM 4767)
- Cool Breeze (soundtrack) – 1972 (MGM, 1 SE 35 ST)
- We're Almost Home – 1972 (MGM 4830)
- History of Solomon Burke – 1972 (Pride 0011)
- I Have a Dream – 1974 (ABC/Dunhill ABC 50161)
- Music to Make Love By – 1975 (Chess 60042) (#54 R&B, chart run – 6 weeks)
- Back to My Roots – 1976 (Chess 19002)
- Sidewalks, Fences and Walls – 1979 (Infinity 9024)
- From the Heart – 1981 (Charly R&B CRB 1024)
- Lord, I Need a Miracle Right Now – 1981 (Savoy 14660)
- Into My Life You Came – 1982 (Savoy 14679)
- Take Me, Shake Me – 1983 (Savoy 14717)
- This Is His Song – 1984 (Savoy 14738)
- Soul Alive! – 1984 (Rounder 2042/2043)
- A Change Is Gonna Come – 1986 (Rounder 2053)
- Love Trap – 1987 (Royalty-Gate MCI Records/Isis-Voice 21336)
- Homeland – 1991 (Bizarre/Straight 70558)
- Soul of the Blues – 1993 (Black Top 1095)
- The Definition of Soul – 1997 (Pointblank 42557)
- Not by Water but Fire This Time – 1999 (GTR 0237)
- Christmas All Over the World – 1999 (One)
- The Commitment – 2001 (GTROC7994251SB, Canada)
- Don't Give Up on Me – 2002 (ANTI-/Fat Possum 80358)
- Make Do with What You Got – 2005 (Shout! Factory, DK 34357)
- Nashville – 2006 (Shout! Factory 826663-10179)
- Like a Fire – 2008 (Shout! Factory 826663-10846)
- Nothing's Impossible – 2010 (E1, E1E-CD-2086)
- Hold On Tight (with De Dijk) – 2010 (Universal Music)

== Compilations ==
- Solomon Burke's Greatest Hits – 1962 (Atlantic 8067)
- The Best of Solomon Burke – 1965 (Atlantic 8109) (#6 R&B, #141 Pop)
- The King of Soul – 1980 LP (Charly 1024) Reissued – 1995 (Charly 8014)
- Cry to Me – 1984 LP (Charly 1075)
- You Can Run, But You Can't Hide – 1987 (Mr. R&B, RBD-108)
- Bishop Rides South – 1988 (Charly 1187)
- Best of Solomon Burke – 1991 (Curb 77422)
- Home in Your Heart: The Best of Solomon Burke – 1992 (Rhino/Atlantic 70284)
- Let Your Love Flow – 1993 (Shanachie 9202)
- Solomon Burke's Greatest Hits – 1997 (Sequel 859) = Reissue of Atlantic 8067
- If You Need Me – 1997 (Sequel 860) = Reissue of Atlantic 8075
- Rock 'N Soul – 1997 (Sequel 861) = Reissue of Atlantic 8096
- King Solomon – 1997 (Sequel 862) = Reissue of Atlantic 8158
- I Wish I Knew – 1997 (Sequel 863) = Reissue of Atlantic 8185
- We Need a Miracle – 1998 (Malaco 501 3116)
- The Very Best of Solomon Burke – 1998 (Rhino/Atlantic 72972)
- King of Rock 'N' Soul – 1998 (Black Top 7006)
- If You Need Me/Rock 'N Soul – 1998 (Collectables 6225) = Reissue of Atlantic 8075 and 8096
- King Solomon/I Wish I Knew – 1999 (Koch 8016) = Reissue of Atlantic 8158 and 8185
- Proud Mary: The Bell Sessions – 2000 (Sundazed, SC 11079)
- The Collection – 2004 (Spectrum)
- That's Heavy Baby: The Best of the MGM Years 1971–1973 – 2005 (Raven)
- The Chess Collection – 2006 (Chess/Universal)
- This Is It: Apollo Soul Origins – 2008 (Shout! 46)
- No Man Walks Alone 1955–1957 – 2008 (Saga)
- Looking for a Sign: The Complete ABC & Pride Recordings 1972–74 – 2009 (Shambala)

== Live albums ==
- Live at the House of the Blues – 1994 (Black Top 1108)
- Live in Nashville (Snapper) – 2007 – DVD
- The Last Great Concert, Switzerland 2008 – 2012 (Floating World Records)
- Live at Montreux 2006 – 2013 (Eagle Records)

== Singles ==
Year	Titles (A-side, B-side) Both tracks from same album except where indicated	Label & Cat. No.	US Pop	US R&B	Album
1955	"Christmas Presents" b/w "When I'm All Alone" (from Solomon Burke)	Apollo 485	—	—	Non-album track
1956	"I'm in Love" b/w "Why Do Me That Way"	Apollo 487	—	—	Solomon Burke
1956	"To Thee" b/w "I'm All Alone"	Apollo 491	—	—	Solomon Burke
1956	"No Man Walks Alone" b/w "Walking in a Dream"	Apollo 500	—	—	Solomon Burke
1956	"You Can Run but You Can't Hide" b/w "A Picture of You"	Apollo 505	—	—	Solomon Burke
1957	"I Need You Tonight" b/w "This Is It" (Non-album track)	Apollo 511	—	—	Solomon Burke
1957	"You Are My One Love" b/w "For You and You Alone"	Apollo 512	—	—	Solomon Burke
1958	"My Heart Is a Chapel" b/w "This Is It"	Apollo 527	—	—	Non-album tracks
1959	"Doodle Dee Doo" b/w "It's All Right"	Singular 1314	—	—	Non-album tracks
1960	"This Little Ring" b/w "I'm Not Afraid"	Singular 1812 (original); Mala 420 (rerelease)	—	—	Non-album tracks
1961	"Keep the Magic Working" b/w "How Many Times"	Atlantic 2089	—	—	Solomon Burke's Greatest Hits
1961	"Just Out of Reach (of My Two Open Arms)" b/w "Be Bop Grandma" (from Solomon Burke's Greatest Hits)	Atlantic 2114	24	7	Rock 'N Soul
1962	"Cry to Me" b/w "I Almost Lost My Mind" (from Solomon Burke's Greatest Hits)	Atlantic 2131	44	5	Rock 'N Soul
1962	"I'm Hanging Up My Heart for You" / "Down in the Valley"	Atlantic 2147	85; 71	15; 20	Solomon Burke's Greatest Hits
1962	"I Really Don't Want to Know" b/w "Tonight My Heart Is Crying"	Atlantic 2157	93	—	If You Need Me
1962	"Go On Back to Him" b/w "I Said I Was Sorry"	Atlantic 2170	—	—	If You Need Me
1963	"Words" b/w "Home in Your Heart"	Atlantic 2180	121	—	If You Need Me
1963	"If You Need Me" b/w "You Can Make It If You Try"	Atlantic 2185	37	2	If You Need Me
1963	"Can't Nobody Love You" b/w "Stupidity"	Atlantic 2196	66	—	If You Need Me
1963	"You're Good for Me" b/w "Beautiful Brown Eyes"	Atlantic 2205	49	8	Rock 'N Soul
1964	"He'll Have to Go" b/w "Rockin' Soul" (Non-album track)	Atlantic 2218	51	17	Rock 'N Soul
1964	"Goodbye Baby (Baby Goodbye)" b/w "Someone to Love Me"	Atlantic 2226	33	8	Rock 'N Soul
1964	"Everybody Needs Somebody to Love" b/w "Looking for My Baby" (from Solomon Burke's Greatest Hits)	Atlantic 2241	58	4	The Best of Solomon Burke
1964	"Yes I Do" b/w "Won't You Give Him (One More Chance)" (from Rock 'N Soul)	Atlantic 2254	92	38	Non-album track
1964	"The Price" b/w "More Rockin' Soul" (Non-album track)	Atlantic 2259	57	10	The Best of Solomon Burke
1965	"Got to Get You Off My Mind" b/w "Peepin'" (Non-album track)	Atlantic 2276	22	1	The Best of Solomon Burke
1965	"Tonight's the Night" b/w "Maggie's Farm" (Non-album track)	Atlantic 2288	28	2	The Best of Solomon Burke
1965	"Someone Is Watching" b/w "Dance Dance Dance" (Non-album track)	Atlantic 2299	89	24	King Solomon
1965	"Only Love (Can Save Me Now)" b/w "Little Girl That Loves Me"	Atlantic 2308	94	—	Non-album tracks
1966	"Baby Come On Home" b/w "Can't Stop Lovin' You Now" (Non-album track)	Atlantic 2314	96	31	King Solomon
1966	"I Feel a Sin Coming On" b/w "Mountain of Pride"	Atlantic 2327	97	—	Non-album tracks
1966	"Suddenly" b/w "Lawdy Miss Clawdy"	Atlantic 2345	—	—	Non-album tracks
1966	"Keep Looking" b/w "I Don't Want You No More"	Atlantic 2349	109	38	Non-album tracks
1966	"Woman How Do You Make Me Love You Like I Do" b/w "When She Touches Me"	Atlantic 2359	—	—	King Solomon
1966	"Presents for Christmas" b/w "A Tear Fell" (Non-album track)	Atlantic 2369	—	—	King Solomon
1967	"Keep a Light in the Window Till I Come Home" b/w "Time Is a Thief"	Atlantic 2378	64	15	King Solomon
1967	"Take Me (Just As I Am)" b/w "I Stayed Away Too Long" (Non-album track)	Atlantic 2416	49	11	King Solomon
1967	"Detroit City" b/w "It's Been a Change"	Atlantic 2459	104	47	King Solomon
1968	"Party People" b/w "Need Your Love So Bad" (Non-album track)	Atlantic 2483	112	—	King Solomon
1968	"I Wish I Knew How It Would Feel to Be Free" b/w "It's Just a Matter of Time" (from King Solomon)	Atlantic 2507	68	32	I Wish I Knew
1968	"Save It" b/w "Meet Me in Church"	Atlantic 2527	—	—	I Wish I Knew
1968	"Soul Meeting" b/w "That's How It Feels"	Atlantic 2530	—	—	Non-album tracks
1968	"Get Out of My Life, Woman" b/w "What'd I Say"	Atlantic 2566	—	—	I Wish I Knew
1969	"Up Tight Good Woman" b/w "I Can't Stop"	Bell 759	116	47	Proud Mary
1969	"Proud Mary" b/w "What Am I Living for"	Bell 783	45	15	Proud Mary
1969	"That Lucky Old Sun" b/w "How Big a Fool"	Bell 806	129	—	Proud Mary
1969	"The Generation of Revelations" b/w "I'm Gonna Stay Right Here"	Bell 829	—	—	Non-album tracks
1970	"In the Ghetto" b/w "God Knows I Love You"	Bell 891	—	—	Non-album tracks
1970	"All for the Love of Sunshine" b/w "Lookin' Out My Back Door"	MGM 14185	—	—	Electronic Magnetism
1971	"The Electronic Magnetism (That's Heavy, Baby)" b/w "Bridge of Life"	MGM 14221	96	26	Electronic Magnetism
1971	"The Night They Drove Old Dixie Down" b/w "PRS 1983" (from Electronic Magnetism)	MGM 14302	—	—	Non-album track
1972	"Love's Street and Fool's Road" b/w "I Got to Tell It" (from We're Almost Home)	MGM 14353	89	13	Cool Breeze
1972	"We're Almost Home" b/w "Fight Back" (from Cool Breeze)	MGM 14402	—	42	We're Almost Home
1972	"Get Up and Do Something for Yourself" b/w "Misty" (from We're Almost Home)	MGM 14425	—	49	Cool Breeze
1972	"I Can't Stop Loving You" (Part 1) b/w Part 2	Pride 1017	—	—	History of Solomon Burke
1972	"I Can't Stop Loving You" (Part 1) b/w "All I Want for Christmas" (Non-album track)	Pride 1022	—	—	History of Solomon Burke
1973	"Ookie Bookie Man" b/w "My Prayer" (from History of Solomon Burke)	Pride 1028	—	—	Non-album tracks
1973	"Shambala" b/w "Love Thy Neighbor"	MGM 14571	—	97	Non-album tracks
1974	"Midnight and You" b/w "I Have A Dream" (from I Have A Dream)	Dunhill 4388	—	14	Non-album tracks
1974	"You and Your Baby Blues" b/w "I'm Leaving on That Late, Late Train" (Non-album track)	Chess 2159	96	19	Music to Make Love By
1975	"Let Me Wrap My Arms Around You" b/w "Everlasting Love"	Chess 2172	—	72	Music to Make Love By
1976	"I'll Never Stop Loving You" b/w "The Do Right Song"	Chess 401	—	—	Back to My Roots
1978	"Please Don't You Say Goodbye to Me" b/w "See That Girl"	Amherst 736	—	91	Non-album tracks
1979	"Sidewalks, Fences and Walls" b/w "Boo Hoo Hoo"	Infinity 50046	—	—	Sidewalks, Fences and Walls
1985	"My Aunt Margurite" b/w "God We Need a Miracle (Right Now)"	Mother Earth 71442	—	—	Lord, I Need a Miracle Right Now
1986	"Love Buys Love" b/w "Don't Tell Me What a Man Won't Do for a Woman"	Rounder 4557	—	—	A Change Is Gonna Come
2002	"None of Us Are Free" (radio edit) "Don't Give Up on Me" (live, non-album track) "I Need a Holiday" (Non-album track); CD Maxi-single	Fat Possum 1090-2	—	—	Don't Give Up on Me
"—" denotes releases that did not chart or were not released in that territory.

== Contributions ==
- Jackpot of Hits (Apollo 490) Various Artists – 1959 – "Just Walking In A Dream" and "You Can Run But You Can't Hide"
- Blues Before Sunrise starring Ray Charles and Solomon Burke (Grand Prix 406) – 1964 – "Friendship Ring", "Mama, Mama Dear", and "Leave My Kitten Alone";
- Soul Clan (ATCO) Soul Clan – 1969 – "Just Out of Reach (of My Open Arms)" Reissue: 2009
- Gospel at Christmas (Hob 3525) Various Artists – 1993 – "Let's Keep the Christ in Christmas"
- Soul Christmas (Atlantic/ WEA) Various Artists – 1994 – "Christmas Presents"
- Till the Night Is Gone: A Tribute to Doc Pomus (Rhino 71878) Various Artists – 1995 – "Still in Love"
- I'll Always Love My Mama (AMW) Various Artists – 1999 – "Mother Loves Her Children All the Same"
- At the Club (Kent) Various Artists – 1999 – "Keep Lookin'"
- The Beat Goes On...Atlantic's Dance Through The 50s, 60s & 70s (CD Kent 191 UK) – 2000 – "Maggie's Farm"
- Sanctified Soul (Kent) – 2000 – "He'll Have To Go" and "That's How It Feels" (The Soul Clan)
- Ultimate Dirty Dancing (RCA Victor Europe) Various Artists – 2000 – "Cry to Me" reissued 2006 (Sony BMG)
- Joyful Noise – Derek Trucks Band – 2002 – "Home in Your Heart" and "Like Anyone Else"
- Lifted: Songs of the Spirit – 2002 – "None of Us Are Free"
- The Heart and Soul of Bert Berns (Umvd Labels) Various Artists – 2002 – "Everybody Needs Somebody to Love"
- ZU & Co. – Zucchero – 2004 – "Diavolo in Me / Devil in Me"
- Jack O the Green – Jools Holland – 2005 – "Message to My Son" with Eric Clapton
- Atlantic Top 60: Sweat-Soaked Soul Classics (Rhino Atlantic) Various Artists – 2007 – "Cry to Me (Single/LP Version)", "Everybody Needs Somebody to Love", "Got to Get You Off My Mind (LP Version)", "If You Need Me (Single/LP Version)", "Just Out of Reach (of My Two Empty Arms)", and "Soul Meeting' (LP version) – The Soul Clan
- Brussel – De Dijk – 2008 – "Het Moet En Het Zal/Enough Is Enough"
- The Bert Berns Story Volume 1: Twist & Shout 1960–1964 (Ace Records UK) Various Artists – 2008 – "Cry to Me"
- The Bert Berns Story – Mr Success Volume 2: 1964–1967 (Ace Records UK) Various Artists – 2009 – "Everybody Needs Somebody to Love"
- Only in America: Atlantic Soul Classics – (Rhino Atlantic) – 2009 – "Stupidity", "If You Need Me", "Everybody Needs Somebody to Love", "Keep Looking", "Maggie's Farm", "That's How It Feels" (as part of the Soul Clan)
- How Many Roads – Black America Sings Bob Dylan (Ace Records UK) Various Artists – 2010 – "Maggie's Farm"
