= Freddie Scott =

American R&B singer (1933–2007)

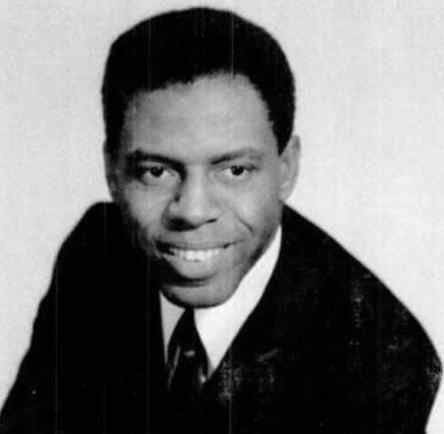
- Scott c. 1966

Background information
- Born: April 24, 1933; Providence, Rhode Island, U.S.
- Died: June 4, 2007 (aged 74) New York City, U.S.
- Genres: Soul; R&B
- Occupations: Singer; songwriter
- Years active: 1956–2003
- Labels: J&S; Joy; Colpix; Columbia; Shout; Elephant V; Probe; Vanguard; Pickwick; Mainstream

Freddie Scott (April 24, 1933 – June 4, 2007) was an American soul singer and songwriter. His biggest hits were "Hey, Girl", a top ten US pop hit in 1963, and "Are You Lonely for Me", a No. 1 hit on the R&B chart in early 1967.

== Life and career ==
He was born in Providence, Rhode Island, United States, and sang in his grandmother's gospel group, Sally Jones & the Gospel Keyes, touring England with at the age of 12. He studied medicine at the University of Rhode Island and then at Paine College in Augusta, Georgia, but began singing again with the Swanee Quintet Juniors and gave up his medical career.

In 1956, he recorded as a secular singer with the J&S label in New York City, releasing his first solo single "Running Home". He also wrote the top 10 R&B hit "I'll Be Spinning" for the label's duo Johnnie & Joe, and his song "Baby I'm Sorry" was recorded by Ricky Nelson for his 1957 debut album Ricky. He was conscripted for the U.S Military, but continued to record for small labels with little success. After leaving the military, he turned to songwriting, joining the Aldon Music publishing company set up by Al Nevins and Don Kirshner in the Brill Building, where he recorded many of his own demos and worked as a record producer with Erma Franklin. He also continued to release his own records, including "Baby, You're a Long Time Dead" for Joy Records (New York) in 1961.

In 1962, he worked with fellow songwriters Gerry Goffin and Carole King on their song "Hey, Girl", recording a demo for singer Chuck Jackson. When Jackson failed to come to a recording session, Scott recorded the song, and, when eventually released by the Colpix label some months later, it rose to no. 10 on both the pop and R&B charts. He followed it with a slow version of Ray Charles' "I Got a Woman", which again made the charts. When Colpix collapsed, he moved to Columbia, which tried to market him, with little success. He left Columbia Records in 1965, and moved to the Shout label, a subsidiary of Bert Berns' Bang Records. There, he recorded Berns' song "Are You Lonely for Me", reputedly requiring over 100 takes before it was finished. The record stayed at the top of the R&B charts for four weeks and reached no. 39 on the pop chart.

He followed up with a version of "Cry to Me", another Berns song that had previously been a hit for Solomon Burke and Betty Harris. Although he continued to have success with R&B chart hits, including "(You) Got What I Need", written and produced by Kenny Gamble and Leon Huff, and a version of Van Morrison's "He Ain't Give You None", his career was affected by Berns' sudden death at the end of 1967. Scott continued to perform, but spent much of the next two years without a record deal. He eventually signed with the small Elephant V label, before moving on to Probe Records, where he had his last R&B hit in 1970 with a version of Bob Dylan's "I Shall Be Released." He continued to work with his songwriting partner Helen Miller, wrote advertising jingles, and took minor roles as an actor in films, including Stiletto. He also recorded in the early 1970s for the Vanguard, Pickwick International and Mainstream labels, and continued to perform concerts.

Scott later worked on the oldies circuit, and released a new album, Brand New Man, in 2001. He also performed "Brown Eyed Girl" on the Van Morrison tribute album Vanthology, released in 2003. He died in New York City in 2007 at the age of 74.

His 1968 song "(You) Got What I Need" was sampled for the 1989 Biz Markie hit "Just a Friend". It also was sampled for Ghostface Killah's "Save Me Dear" in 2004.

== Discography ==
=== Chart singles ===
Year	Single	Chart Positions	
Year	Single	US Pop	US R&B
1963	"Hey, Girl"	10	10
1963	"I Got a Woman"	48	n/a (Note: Billboard R&B chart not published at that time)
1964	"Where Does Love Go"	82	n/a
1966	"Are You Lonely for Me"	39	1
1967	"Cry to Me"	70	40
1967	"Am I Grooving You"	71	25
1967	"He Ain't Give You None"	100	24
1968	"(You) Got What I Need"	-	27
1970	"I Shall Be Released"	-	40

=== Albums ===
- Everything I Have Is Yours (1964)
- Freddie Scott Sings and Sings and Sings (1964)
- Are You Lonely For Me? (1967)
- I Shall Be Released (1970)
- Brand New Man (2001)
