= List of Top Selling R&B Singles number ones of 1967 =

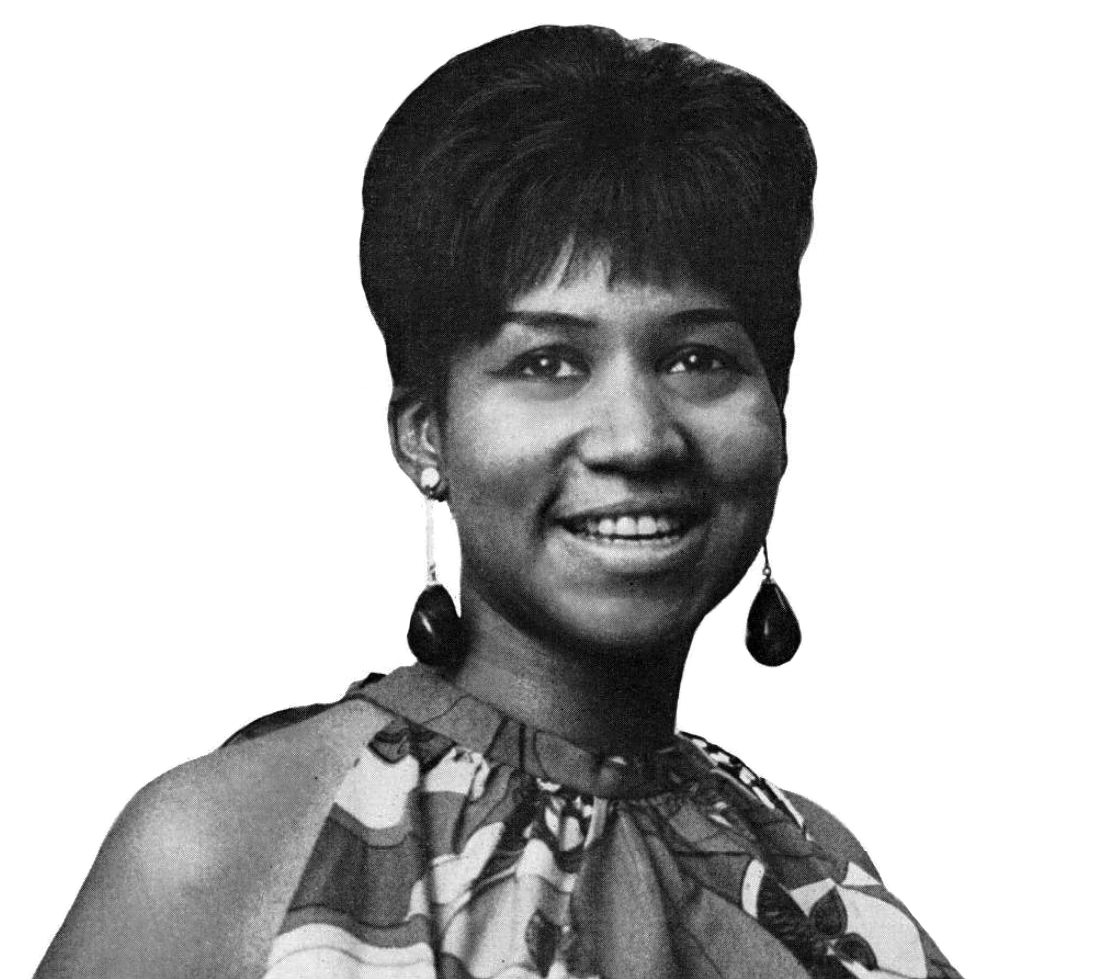
"Queen of Soul" Aretha Franklin had three number ones ("I Never Loved a Man (The Way I Love You)", "Respect", and "Baby I Love You") in 1967.

In 1967, Billboard published a weekly chart ranking the top-performing singles in the United States in rhythm and blues (R&B) and related African American-oriented music genres; the chart has undergone various name changes over the decades to reflect the evolution of such genres and since 2005 has been published as Hot R&B/Hip-Hop Songs. During the year, 14 different singles topped the chart, which was published under the title Top Selling R&B Singles.

Aretha Franklin was the only artist with multiple number ones in 1967; she spent seven weeks atop the chart between March and May with "I Never Loved a Man (The Way I Love You)", and after a single week out of the top spot returned with "Respect", which spent eight weeks in the peak position. In August, Franklin gained her third chart-topper of the year with "Baby I Love You", which held the top spot for two weeks, giving the singer a total of 17 weeks at number one during 1967, more than double the figure achieved by any other act. Franklin had first charted in 1961, but her career did not fully take off until she joined Atlantic Records in 1966, after which she became one of the biggest stars in popular music. Nicknamed the "Queen of Soul", she was named the greatest singer of all time by Rolling Stone magazine in 2023.

Franklin was among a number of acts to reach number one for the first time in 1967. Aaron Neville achieved the same feat when he moved into the number one position in the issue of Billboard dated January 7 with "Tell It Like It Is", and later in the year Freddie Scott and Bettye Swann each gained their first and only chart-topper with "Are You Lonely for Me" and "Make Me Yours" respectively. The year's final number one was "I Heard It Through the Grapevine" by Gladys Knight & the Pips, which reached the top spot in the issue of Billboard dated December 2 and stayed there for the remainder of the year. It was the first of two versions of the song to top the chart in a little over a year; Marvin Gaye would take his version of the song to number one in December 1968. Two of 1967's rhythm & blues number ones also topped the all-genre Hot 100 chart: "Love Is Here and Now You're Gone" by the Supremes and "Respect" by Aretha Franklin. The Supremes also topped the Hot 100 with "The Happening", but that single failed to even enter the top 10 of the R&B listing.

== Chart history ==
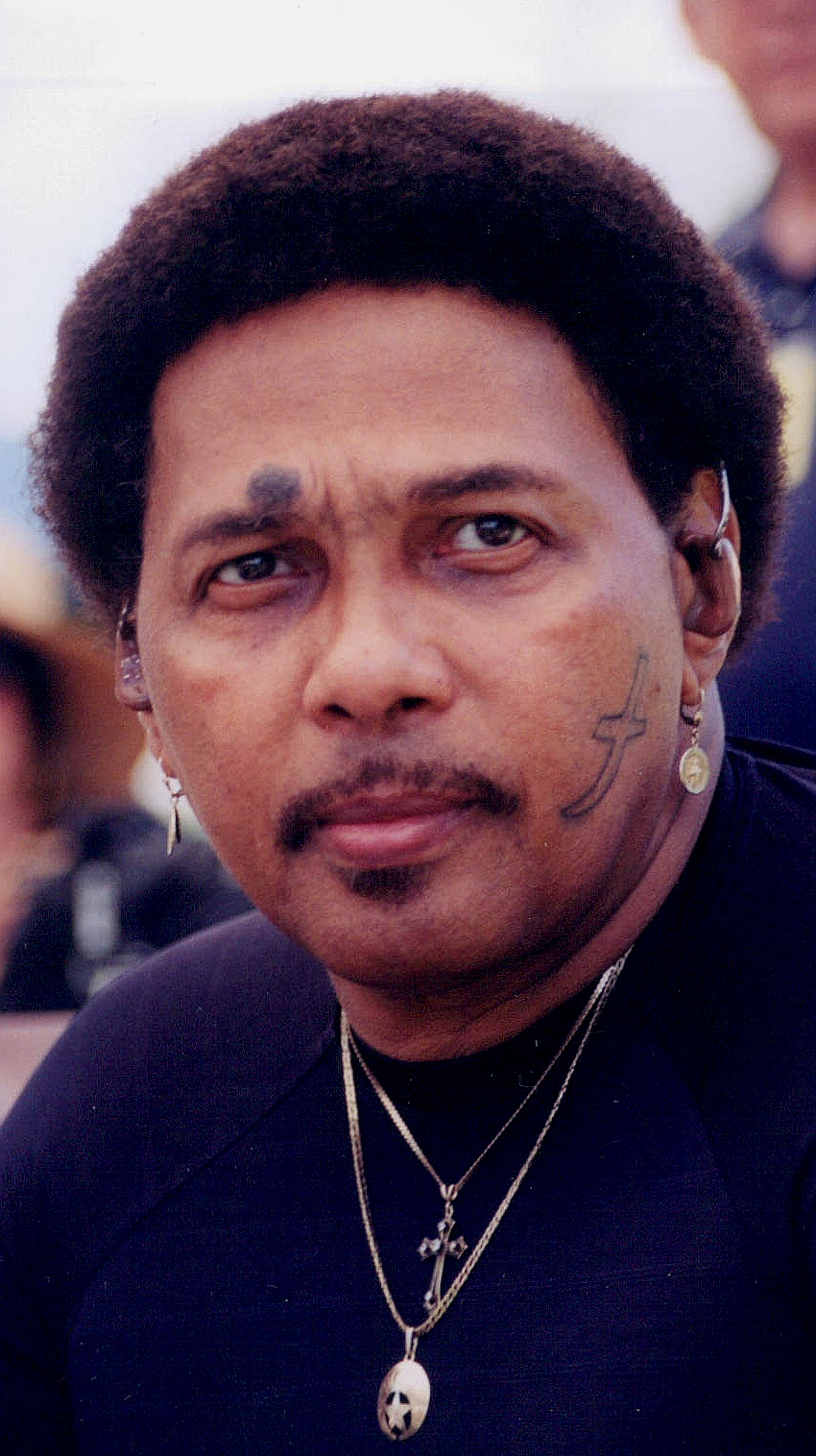
Aaron Neville (pictured in 1999) had the year's first number one with "Tell It Like It Is".

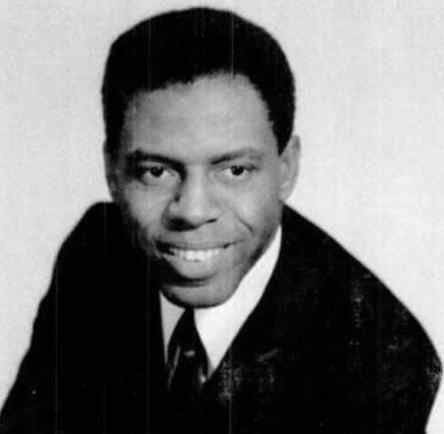
"Are You Lonely for Me" was the only chart-topper for Freddie Scott.

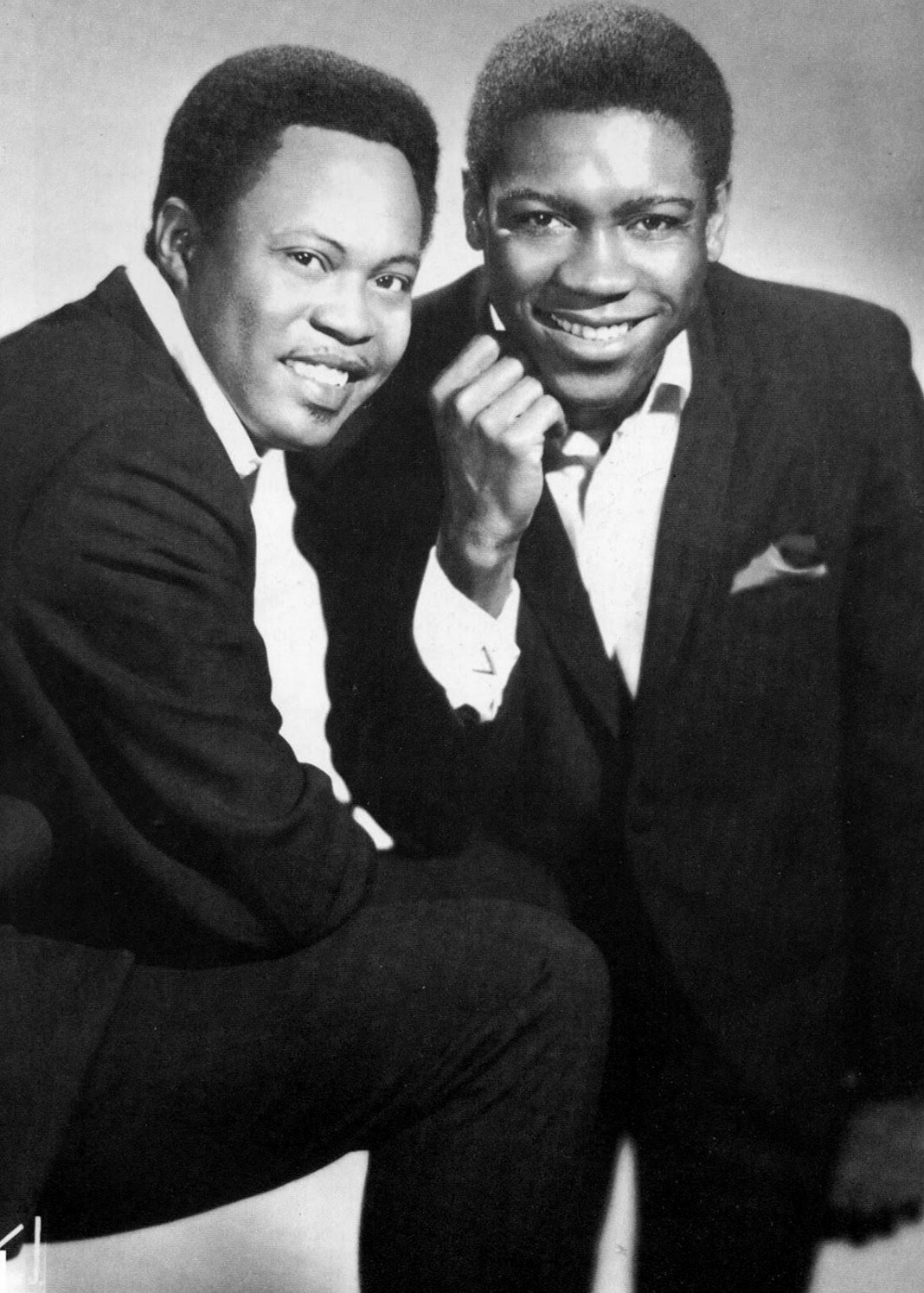
Sam & Dave spent seven weeks atop the chart with "Soul Man".

Key
†	Indicates best-charting R&B single of 1967

Chart history
Issue date	Title	Artist(s)	Ref.
January 7	"Tell It Like It Is"	Aaron Neville	
January 14	"Tell It Like It Is"	Aaron Neville	
January 21	"Tell It Like It Is"	Aaron Neville	
January 28	"Tell It Like It Is"	Aaron Neville	
February 4	"Tell It Like It Is"	Aaron Neville	
February 11	"Are You Lonely for Me"	Freddie Scott	
February 18	"Are You Lonely for Me"	Freddie Scott	
February 25	"Are You Lonely for Me"	Freddie Scott	
March 4	"Are You Lonely for Me"	Freddie Scott	
March 11	"Love Is Here and Now You're Gone"	The Supremes	
March 18	"Love Is Here and Now You're Gone"	The Supremes	
March 25	"I Never Loved a Man (The Way I Love You)"	Aretha Franklin	
April 1	"I Never Loved a Man (The Way I Love You)"	Aretha Franklin	
April 8	"I Never Loved a Man (The Way I Love You)"	Aretha Franklin	
April 15	"I Never Loved a Man (The Way I Love You)"	Aretha Franklin	
April 22	"I Never Loved a Man (The Way I Love You)"	Aretha Franklin	
April 29	"I Never Loved a Man (The Way I Love You)"	Aretha Franklin	
May 6	"I Never Loved a Man (The Way I Love You)"	Aretha Franklin	
May 13	"Jimmy Mack"	Martha and the Vandellas	
May 20	"Respect" †	Aretha Franklin	
May 27	"Respect" †	Aretha Franklin	
June 3	"Respect" †	Aretha Franklin	
June 10	"Respect" †	Aretha Franklin	
June 17	"Respect" †	Aretha Franklin	
June 24	"Respect" †	Aretha Franklin	
July 1	"Respect" †	Aretha Franklin	
July 8	"Respect" †	Aretha Franklin	
July 15	"I Was Made to Love Her"	Stevie Wonder	
July 22	"Make Me Yours"	Bettye Swann	
July 29	"Make Me Yours"	Bettye Swann	
August 5	"I Was Made to Love Her"	Stevie Wonder	
August 12	"I Was Made to Love Her"	Stevie Wonder	
August 19	"I Was Made to Love Her"	Stevie Wonder	
August 26	"Baby I Love You"	Aretha Franklin	
September 2	"Baby I Love You"	Aretha Franklin	
September 9	"Cold Sweat"	James Brown	
September 16	"Cold Sweat"	James Brown	
September 23	"Cold Sweat"	James Brown	
September 30	"Funky Broadway"	Wilson Pickett	
October 7	"(Your Love Keeps Lifting Me) Higher and Higher"	Jackie Wilson	
October 14	"Soul Man"	Sam & Dave	
October 21	"Soul Man"	Sam & Dave	
October 28	"Soul Man"	Sam & Dave	
November 4	"Soul Man"	Sam & Dave	
November 11	"Soul Man"	Sam & Dave	
November 18	"Soul Man"	Sam & Dave	
November 25	"Soul Man"	Sam & Dave	
December 2	"I Heard It Through the Grapevine"	Gladys Knight & the Pips	
December 9	"I Heard It Through the Grapevine"	Gladys Knight & the Pips	
December 16	"I Heard It Through the Grapevine"	Gladys Knight & the Pips	
December 23	"I Heard It Through the Grapevine"	Gladys Knight & the Pips	
December 30	"I Heard It Through the Grapevine"	Gladys Knight & the Pips	
