= Porretta Soul Festival =

Soul music festival

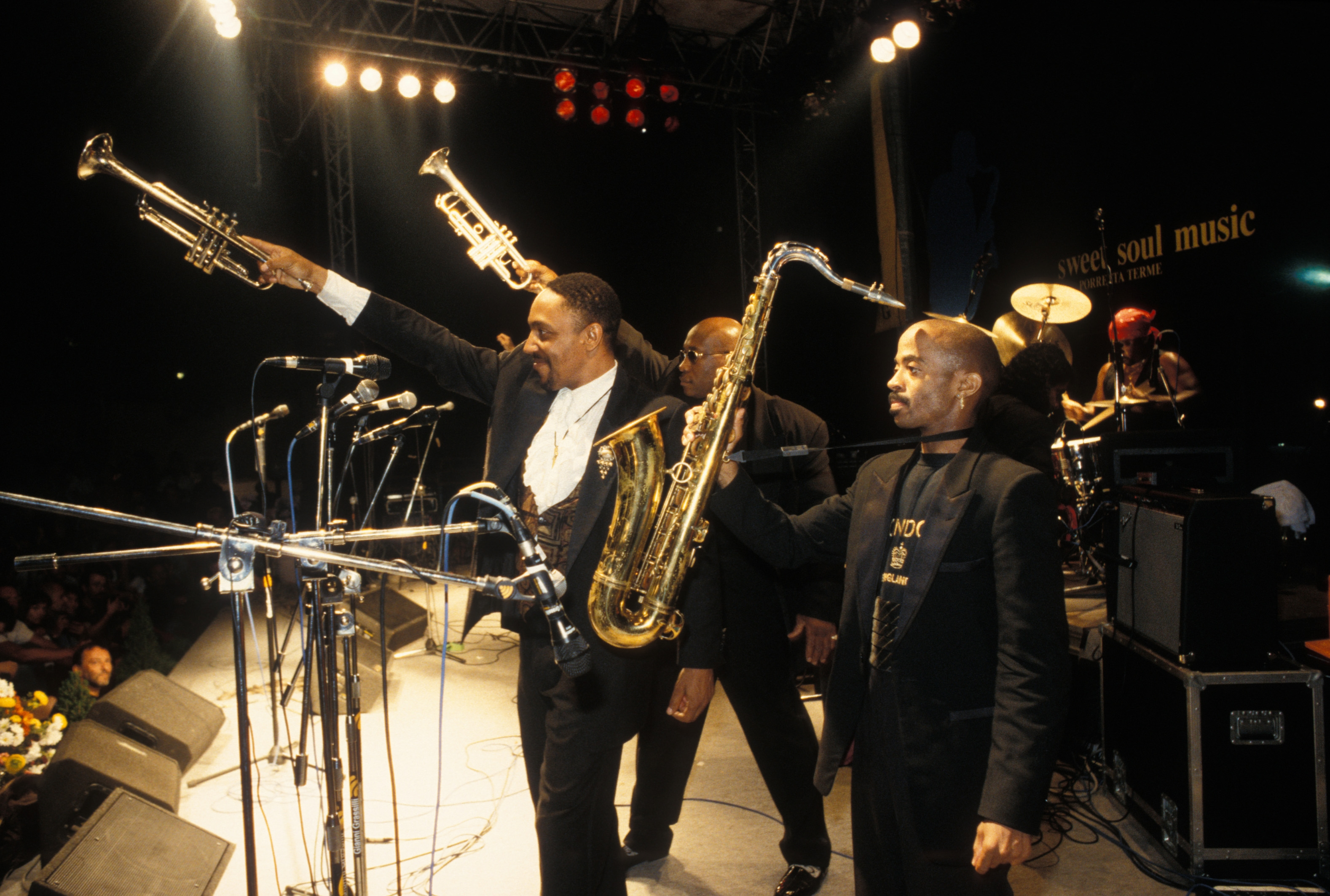
- A performance at the festival
- Genre: soul music
- Dates: Mostly the third week in July - July 22–25, 2010.
- Locations: Porretta, Italy
- Years active: 1988 - Present
- Founders: Graziano Uliani
- Website: Official website

The Porretta Soul Festival is a soul music festival that takes place on the third week of July in the Rufus Thomas Park in Porretta Terme, province of Bologna.

== History ==
The festival was founded on December 10, 1987 by Graziano Uliani, a passionate soul music fan. After attending an event commemorating the twentieth anniversary of the death of Otis Redding in Macon, Georgia, Uliani decided to dedicate a festival in his honour.

Since the time of its inception, Uliani has been able to bring to Porretta some most of the major soul acts in the world. Porretta now has a street dedicated to Otis Redding and the park where the Festival is held is named after Rufus Thomas. After more than thirty years, the Porretta Soul Festival is a stable feature on the geography of soul music and is considered the European showcase of the Memphis Sound. The festival has official links with the Stax Museum of American Soul Music in Memphis and the Center For Southern Folklore in Memphis. The publisher Volo Libero published "Soul City," the history of the Porretta Soul Festival, written by Edoardo Fassio, with a foreword by Renzo Arbore. Due to the Covid-19 pandemic, the 2020 edition was cancelled.

== Artists ==
Artists who performed at the Porretta Soul Festival include Rufus and Carla Thomas, Bobby Manuel & the Memphis All Stars with Marvell and Vaneese Thomas, Solomon Burke, Howard Tate, Isaac Hayes, Wilson Pickett, Percy Sledge, Sam Moore, Irma Thomas, The Memphis Horns, LaVern Baker, Mighty Sam McClain and Peter Giftos, Millie Jackson, Otis Clay, Ann Peebles, Mavis Staples, Booker T. & the M.G.s, The Neville Brothers, Chaka Khan, Sugar Pie DeSanto, Joe Simon, Mable John, The Bar-Kays, Harvey Scales, The Bo-Keys, Patti Russo, and Betty Harris.
