= Rock 'N Soul (Solomon Burke album) =

Studio album by Solomon Burke
- Released: July 1964
- Genre: Soul
- Length: 34:06
- Label: Atlantic
- Producer: Bert Berns

Solomon Burke chronology
Solomon Burke (1962)	Rock 'N Soul (1964)	The Best of Solomon Burke (1965)

Singles from Rock 'N Soul
- 1. "Just Out of Reach (of My Two Open Arms)" Released: August 3, 1961; 2. "Cry to Me" Released: 1962; 3. "You're Good for Me" Released: 1963; 4. "He'll Have to Go" Released: 1964; 5. "Goodbye Baby (Baby Goodbye)" Released: 1964

Professional ratings
Review scores
Source	Rating
AllMusic	3.5/5 stars

Rock 'N Soul is a 1964 studio album by Grammy Award winning musician Solomon Burke. The album contained seven top 100 hits. Originally released on LP on Atlantic Records, #8096, in July 1964, it was subsequently reissued in March, 1997, on the Sequel Records imprint, #RSACD 861. The album was also reissued in 1998 on the Collectables Records label in conjunction with a June, 1963, Burke album as If You Need Me/Rock 'n' Soul.

The album was included in Robert Dimery's 1001 Albums You Must Hear Before You Die.

== Title ==
The album's title refers to Burke's rank as the "King of Rock 'n' Soul", a label Burke embraced because of the interconnectedness of the musical forms of rock and roll and soul music, telling Jet in 1963 that "without soul, there'd be no rock, and without rock, there'd be no soul." He was also uncomfortable being associated with rhythm and blues, which he believed had "a stigma of profanity", because of his clean lifestyle and strong spiritual beliefs. Burke's coronation as the "King of Rock 'n' Soul" at the Royal Theatre in Baltimore was reported in Jet in January, 1964.

== Songs ==
The album contained seven top 100 Billboard hits, including "Just Out of Reach (Of My Two Empty Arms)", "Cry to Me", "Can't Nobody Love You", "If You Need Me", "You're Good For Me", "Goodbye Baby (Baby Goodbye)", and "He'll Have to Go". The New Rolling Stones Album Guide singles out Burke's version of the 1959 hit "He'll Have to Go" here as "a heartbreaking interpretation" and his version of Woody Guthrie's "Hard, Ain't It Hard" as a "lively stab". Allmusic notes that Burke's version of "Cry to Me" is "vaguely Caribbean in rhythmic feel", contributing to an "upbeat tempo" that stands "at odds" from the "solemn" lyrics.

Charting song	Charting year	Black Singles	Pop Singles	Adult Contemporary
"Just Out of Reach (Of My Two Empty Arms)"	1961	#7	#24	#6
"Cry to Me"	1962	#5	#44	
"Can't Nobody Love You"	1963		#66	
"If You Need Me"	1963	#2	#37	
"You're Good for Me"	1963	#8	#49	
"Goodbye Baby (Baby Goodbye)"	1964	#33	#33	
"He'll Have to Go"	1964	#51	#51	

== Track listing ==
1. "Goodbye Baby (Baby Goodbye)" (Wes Farrell, Bert Russell) – 3:16
2. "Cry to Me" (Bert Russell) – 2:27
3. "Won't You Give Him (One More Chance)" (Joseph Martin, Winfield Scott) – 2:31
4. "If You Need Me" (Robert Bateman, Wilson Pickett, Sonny Sanders) – 2:29
5. "Hard, Ain't It Hard" (Woody Guthrie) – 2:45
6. "Can't Nobody Love You" (James Mitchell) – 2:30
7. "Just Out of Reach" (Virgil Stewart) – 2:46
8. "You're Good for Me" (Don Covay, Horace Ott) – 2:45
9. "You Can't Love Them All" (Bert Berns, Jerry Leiber, Mike Stoller, Nugetre) – 2:40
10. "Someone to Love Me" (Sonny Burke) – 2:59
11. "Beautiful Brown Eyes" (Sonny Burke, Bert Russell) – 3:42
12. "He'll Have to Go" (Audrey Allison, Joe Allison) – 3:16

== Personnel ==
- Solomon Burke – vocals
- Phil Ichle, Tom Dowd – engineers
- Jerry Wexler – production supervision
- Malcolm Walker – cover design
