= Bert Berns =

American songwriter and record producer (1929–1967)

- Berns (left) with Jerry Wexler in the 1960s

Background information
- Also known as: Bert Russell
- Born: Bertrand Russell Berns; November 8, 1929; New York City, U.S.
- Died: December 30, 1967 (aged 38) New York City, U.S.
- Genres: Pop; R&B; rock and roll; soul
- Occupations: Songwriter; record producer; label executive
- Years active: 1960–1967
- Labels: Atlantic; Bang; Shout
- Website: bertberns.com

Bertrand Russell Berns (November 8, 1929 – December 30, 1967), also known as Bert Russell and (occasionally) Russell Byrd, was an American songwriter and record producer of the 1960s. His songwriting credits include "Twist and Shout", "Piece of My Heart", "Here Comes the Night", "Hang on Sloopy", "Cry to Me", "Tell Him" and "Everybody Needs Somebody to Love", and his productions include "Baby, Please Don't Go", "Brown Eyed Girl" and "Under the Boardwalk".

== Early life ==
Berns was born in the Bronx, New York City, the son of Russian-Jewish immigrants who had changed their name from Beresovsky. Berns contracted rheumatic fever as a child, an illness that damaged his heart and would mark the rest of his life, resulting in his early death. Turning to music, he found enjoyment in the sounds of his African-American and Latino neighbors. As a young man, Berns danced in mambo nightclubs, and made his way to Havana before the Cuban Revolution.

== Music career ==
=== Beginnings (1960–1963) ===
Shortly after his return from Cuba, Berns began a seven-year run from an obscure Brill Building songwriter to owner of his own record labels. He signed as a $50/week (equivalent to $500 in 2025) songwriter with Robert Mellin Music at 1650 Broadway in 1960. His first hit record was "A Little Bit of Soap", performed by the Jarmels on Laurie Records in 1961. Berns himself had a short-lived career as a recording artist, and in 1961, under the name "Russell Byrd", Berns scored his only Billboard Hot 100 appearance with his own composition, "You'd Better Come Home", which peaked at Number 50. That song would later be recorded by the Isley Brothers, and featured as the B-side of their 1962 single "Twistin' With Linda". Also in 1962, the Isley Brothers recorded "Twist and Shout" on Wand Records, written by Berns and Phil Medley. Berns also hit the charts in late 1962 with the Exciters' "Tell Him" on United Artists, and with Solomon Burke's "Cry to Me" on Atlantic Records. As an independent producer working with myriad record labels, Berns also made important records with Garnet Mimms ("Cry Baby") and Gene Pitney ("If I Didn't Have a Dime (to Play the Jukebox)").

=== Atlantic Records (1963–1965) ===
Berns's early work with Solomon Burke brought him to the attention of Atlantic label chiefs Ahmet Ertegun and Jerry Wexler. In 1963, Berns replaced Jerry Leiber and Mike Stoller as staff producer at Atlantic, where he wrote and produced hits for Solomon Burke ("Everybody Needs Somebody to Love"), the Drifters ("Under the Boardwalk" and "Saturday Night at the Movies"), Barbara Lewis ("Baby I'm Yours" and "Make Me Your Baby"), Little Esther Phillips ("Hello Walls," written by Willie Nelson), Ben E. King, Wilson Pickett and LaVern Baker.

=== British Invasion (1964–1965) ===
With many of Berns's songs being recorded by British Invasion bands such as the Beatles ("Twist and Shout"), the Rolling Stones ("Cry to Me") and the Animals ("Baby Let Me Take You Home"), Berns became the first American record producer to travel across the Atlantic to work in London. He went to England three times between 1964 and 1965, where he produced a number of British Decca songs such as "Baby, Please Don't Go," a traditional blues song recorded by Them, and "Here Comes the Night," recorded by Lulu and Them.

=== BANG Records (1965–1967) ===
Berns formed his own record label, BANG Records, in 1965. BANG was home to such artists as the McCoys ("Hang on Sloopy"), the Strangeloves ("I Want Candy"), Them's ex-lead singer Van Morrison ("Brown Eyed Girl"), and, most notably, Neil Diamond ("Solitary Man" and "Cherry Cherry," both produced by Jeff Barry and Ellie Greenwich).

=== Shout Records (1966–1967) ===
With BANG Records releasing predominantly rock and roll, Berns formed Shout Records in 1966 as an outlet for his greatest passions of R&B and soul music, recording artists such Freddie Scott ("Are You Lonely for Me Baby") and Erma Franklin ("Piece of My Heart"). "Piece of My Heart", one of his last songs, was covered shortly thereafter by Big Brother and the Holding Company, which the then unknown Janis Joplin fronted, peaking at No. 12 on the Billboard Hot 100; the song also charted on both the Hot 100 and the Billboard Hot Rhythm & Blues Singles charts for Franklin's version (in 1967), on the Hot 100 for a medley by Melissa Etheridge and Joss Stone (in 2005), as well as charting at No. 1 on the Billboard Hot Country Songs chart for Faith Hill's version (in 1994).

== Death and legacy ==
Berns, who had a history of cardiac trouble as a result of his heart being damaged by rheumatic fever contracted during childhood, died of heart failure on December 30, 1967, in his New York apartment, aged 38. He was buried two days later, following a funeral service at Riverside Memorial Chapel on New York's 180 West 76th Street in Manhattan. His widow, Ilene, outlived her husband by nearly 50 years, dying on February 20, 2017, at the age of 73.

The Led Zeppelin outtake "Baby Come On Home" (originally titled "A Tribute to Bert Berns") was loosely based on a song Berns wrote for Hoagy Lands, and was recorded in Berns' honour.

Here Comes the Night: The Dark Soul of Bert Berns and the Dirty Business of Rhythm and Blues by Joel Selvin, a book on his life and career, was published in 2014.

A musical, Piece of My Heart: The Bert Berns Story, by Daniel Goldfarb, premiered off-Broadway in 2014 at the Pershing Square Signature Center.

A documentary film titled BANG! The Bert Berns Story, co-directed by Bert Berns' son Brett Berns and Bob Sarles, premiered at the 2016 SXSW Film Festival to great acclaim. The narration was written by Joel Selvin, from his book Here Comes the Night, and was spoken by Stevie Van Zandt.

== Awards and honors ==
Berns was inducted as a non-performer and given the Ahmet Ertegun Lifetime Achievement Award with the 2016 class to the Rock and Roll Hall of Fame.

== Selected writing credits ==
- "A Little Bit of Soap", The Jarmels (1961)
- "Twist and Shout", The Top Notes (1961), The Isley Brothers (1962), The Beatles (1963)
- "Cry to Me" Solomon Burke (1962), Betty Harris (1963), the Rolling Stones (1964)
- "Tell Him", The Exciters (1962), Billie Davis (1963)
- "Cry Baby", Garnet Mimms (1963), Janis Joplin (1971)
- "One Way Love", The Drifters (1963), Cliff Bennett and the Rebel Rousers (1964)
- "I Don't Want to Go On Without You", The Drifters (1964), The Moody Blues (1965)
- "Everybody Needs Somebody to Love", Solomon Burke (1964), the Rolling Stones (1965), Wilson Pickett (1967), The Blues Brothers (1980)
- "Baby Let Me Take You Home", The Animals (1964)
- "Here Comes the Night", Lulu (1964), Them (1965), David Bowie (1973)
- "I Want Candy" The Strangeloves (1965), Bow Wow Wow (1982)
- "Hang on Sloopy", The McCoys (1965), The Yardbirds (1965)
- "Down in the Valley", Solomon Burke (1964), Otis Redding (1965)
- "I'm Gonna Run Away From You", Tami Lynn, (1964)
- "I'll Take Good Care of You", Garnet Mimms (1967)
- "Are You Lonely for Me", Freddie Scott (1967)
- "Piece of My Heart", Erma Franklin (1967), Big Brother and the Holding Company featuring Janis Joplin (1968), Dusty Springfield (1968)
- "Twenty Five Miles", Edwin Starr (1968)

== Selected producer credits ==
- "Cry to Me", Solomon Burke (1962)
- "Twist and Shout", The Isley Brothers (1962)
- "Nobody but Me", The Isley Brothers (1963)
- "Under the Boardwalk", The Drifters (1964)
- "Everybody Needs Somebody to Love", Solomon Burke (1964)
- "Here Comes the Night", Lulu (1964)
- "Baby, Please Don't Go", Them (1965)
- "Here Comes the Night", Them (1965)
- "Baby I'm Yours", Barbara Lewis (1965)
- "Make Me Your Baby", Barbara Lewis (1965)
- "Piece of My Heart", Erma Franklin (1967)
- "Brown Eyed Girl", Van Morrison (1967)

== Selected discography ==
- The Heart and Soul of Bert Berns (2003) a CD compiled by Doug Morris and Universal Music encompassing some of Berns' best work.
- Twist and Shout: The Bert Berns Story – Vol. 1: 1960–1964 (2008), a CD featuring more than two dozen of Berns' R&B and rock hits, released through Ace Records of England.
- Mr. Success: The Bert Berns Story – Vol. 2: 1964–1967 (2010), a CD featuring more than two dozen of Berns' R&B and rock hits, released through Ace Records of England.
- Hang on Sloopy: The Bert Berns Story – Vol. 3 (2014), a CD featuring more than two dozen of Berns' R&B and rock hits, released through Ace Records of England.
