= Cry to Me =

Single by Solomon Burke

from the album Rock 'n Soul
- B-side: "I Almost Lost My Mind"
- Released: 1962
- Recorded: 1961
- Venue: New York City
- Genre: Soul
- Length: 2:33
- Label: Atlantic (45-2131)
- Songwriter: Bert Berns
- Producer: Bert Berns

Solomon Burke singles chronology
"Just Out of Reach (Of My Two Open Arms)" (1961)	"Cry to Me" (1962)	"I'm Hanging Up My Heart For You" (1962)

"Cry to Me" is a song written by Bert Berns (listed as "Bert Russell") and first recorded by American soul singer Solomon Burke in 1961. Released in 1962, it was Burke's second single to appear in both Billboard magazine's Hot R&B Sides and Hot 100 singles charts. On March 20, 1962, Burke performed "Cry to Me" on American Bandstand.

== Background ==
On December 6, 1961 Burke recorded one of his best known songs, "Cry to Me", "an ode to loneliness and desire" "one of the first songs to unify country, gospel and R&B in one package", that is considered "the paradigm for Southern soul ballads." "Cry to Me" was written by Bert Berns (as Bert Russell), conducted and arranged by Klaus Ogermann, and produced by Bert Berns, "a roly-poly white New Yorker with a deep love and empathy for black music despite a formal music education at the Juilliard School of Music and a music background far removed from the searing soul in which, by 1963, he specialized", with whom Burke had a difficult relationship. Burke "distrusted the young producer", and often spoke of him disparagingly, but later acknowledged Berns as "a genius" and "a great writer, a great man." Cissy Houston, who provided backing vocals on several of Burke's songs that were produced by Berns, believed "Burke changed his mind about Bert as soon as Sol started working with him in the studio. Bert's emotion-charged songs and Sol's gospel delivery was a marriage made in heaven." Although Burke recognized Berns's skill for crafting hit records, he rejected two Berns compositions, "Hang on Sloopy" (later recorded by the McCoys), and "A Little Bit of Soap", a recent hit for the Jarmels. Burke explained in 2004: "I felt a little unsafe about it, because they were pushing me in an ethnic market, so why would I want to say that (about soap) to my people? It didn't have the meaning it needed to have." In frustration after Burke had rejected his song choices, Berns offered him a final song, "Cry to Me", which Berns sang to him very slowly. According to Burke in a 2008 interview: "I said 'That's terrible. It's just too slow for me, I don't like slow songs.' And Mr Wexler says, 'Listen, this guy writes for you, you're pissing him off. You're pissing me off, too.' (Laughs) I tried to sing it a couple of times that way, couldn't even feel it. Then I asked the young man in the studio, the engineer Tommy Dowd, 'Could we have them speed this up?'".

== Personnel ==
The personnel on the Solomon Burke recording included Leon Cohen on alto sax, Jesse Powell on tenor sax, Hank Jones on piano, Robert Mosely on organ, Phil Kraus on vibes, Don Arnone, Al Caiola, Bucky Pizzarelli, and Everett Barksdale on guitars; Art Davis on bass, and Gary Chester on drums.

== Chart release ==
Released in 1962, "Cry to Me", backed with "I Almost Lost My Mind" (Atlantic 2131), became Burke's second entry in the US charts, peaking at number five on the R&B charts, and number 44 on the Hot 100.

Chart (1962)	Peak position
US Billboard Hot 100	44
US Billboard Hot R&B Sides	5

== Impact ==
After "Cry to Me", Burke became one of the first performers to be called a soul artist. In "Cry to Me", and in his "most popular recordings from 1962 onward, elements of the African-American folk-preaching style", which incorporated "the fusion of speech and song", "the use of repetition or elongation for emphasis", and the improvisation of "hollers and vocal melismas", the "flowers and curlicues of gospel singing", are salient. Burke always had his pulpit in the recording studio.

Burke's recording featured in the soundtrack to the 1987 movie Dirty Dancing and the 2015 movie The Man from U.N.C.L.E.

== Certifications ==
Region	Certification	Certified units/sales
New Zealand (RMNZ)	2× Platinum	60,000^{‡}
United Kingdom (BPI)	Platinum	600,000^{‡}
^{‡} Sales+streaming figures based on certification alone.

== Cover versions ==
Several artists have recorded versions of the song. Among them:

- Betty Harris' rendition (also produced by Bert Berns) reached R&B number 10 and Hot 100 number 23 in September 1963.
- English band Pretty Things recorded it in 1965 and their version reached number 28 on the UK Singles Chart.
- Also in 1965, a rendition by the Rolling Stones was included on their Out of Our Heads on both the UK and US editions of the album.
- Freddie Scott recorded the song in 1967; his single peaked at numbers 40 on the R&B and 70 on the Hot 100.
- The Staccatos, a South African band, performed the song in 1969. It reached #1 on the SA charts and stayed on the charts for 38 weeks.
- Precious Wilson covered the song with Eruption in 1980
- Mitch Ryder recorded a version for his 1983 comeback album, Never Kick a Sleeping Dog, produced by John Mellencamp.
- A cover by Bondi Cigars was included on their 1990 debut self-titled album.
- Huey Lewis & the News included the song on their 2010 album Soulsville.
- British punk band IDLES covered the song on their 2018 album, Joy as an Act of Resistance.
- Dutch DJ-producer CMC$, and Canadian DJ-producer Kilotile; each whom released their own electronic dance versions of the song in 2022.
- American artist Joe Vitullo recorded and released a version of the song in 2023.
