= Are You Lonely for Me (Freddie Scott song) =

"Are You Lonely For Me"

Single by Freddie Scott

from the album Are You Lonely For Me?
- B-side: "Where Were You"
- Released: 1966
- Recorded: 1966
- Length: 3:15
- Label: Shout Records
- Songwriter: Bert Berns
- Producer: Bert Berns

Freddie Scott singles chronology
| "Where Does Love Go" (1964) | "Are You Lonely For Me" (1966) | "Cry to Me" (1967) |

"Are You Lonely for Me", written and produced by Bert Berns (a.k.a. Bert Russell), is a song first recorded by Freddie Scott.

The single was Scott's highest-charting single on the R&B chart, hitting the number-one spot for four weeks, in early 1967. "Are You Lonely For Me" was also Freddie Scott's second and last Top 40-hit single. The song's back up vocals were performed by Cissy Houston and the Sweet Inspirations.

== Chart positions ==
| Chart (1967) | Peak position |
|---|---|
| U.S. Billboard Hot 100 | 39 |
| U.S. Billboard Hot Rhythm & Blues | 1 |

== Cover versions ==
The song has been covered many times since, including renditions by:

- Hank Ballard,
- Commitments,
- Grateful Dead,
- Al Green,
- Chuck Jackson,
- Steve Marriott,
- Otis Redding & Carla Thomas,
- David Johansen.

== Influence ==
- The song was a standard in the Jerry Garcia & Merl Saunders tours from 1972 to 1974.
- Keith Richards named it the one song he would want to be credited for writing
