= Shout Records =

- Founded: 1966
- Founder: Bert Berns
- Genre: R&B / Soul
- Country of origin: New York City. Harlem, United States

Shout Records is a record company founded by songwriter and record producer Bert Berns in 1966.

== History ==
Bert Berns was a founding father of the New York Uptown Soul genre, with rhythm and blues and soul music making up the vast majority of his body of work. Berns experienced enormous success with the establishment of his Bang Records label in 1965, with pop and rock acts such as The McCoys, Neil Diamond, and Van Morrison dominating its roster of artists. Looking to return to his original passion for rhythm and blues, Berns established Shout Records as a subsidiary of Bang Records to be an exclusive home for R&B and soul music.

Berns had immediate success with Freddie Scott on Shout, with the single "Are You Lonely For Me Baby" reaching number one on the R&B charts. A number of artists ranging from Jimmy Radcliffe to The Exciters released records on Shout. Berns' final Shout sessions with Erma Franklin resulted in "Piece of My Heart", which was rising up the charts when Berns died from heart failure on December 30, 1967.

== Shout Records artists ==
- Freddie Scott
- Erma Franklin
- The Exciters
- Jimmy Radcliffe
- Roy C
- Jackie Moore
- Bobby Harris
- Donald Height
- Woody Guenther & The Cheaters

== See also ==
- List of record labels
