= Bettye Swann =

American singer-songwriter (born 1944)

- Also known as: Betty Barton
- Born: Betty Jean Champion; October 24, 1944 (age 81); Shreveport, Louisiana, U.S.
- Genres: Soul
- Occupation: Singer
- Instrument: Voice
- Years active: 1964–1980

Bettye Swann (born Betty Jean Champion; October 24, 1944), also known as Betty Barton, is an American soul singer. She is best known for her 1967 hit song "Make Me Yours".

== Career ==
Swann was born in Shreveport, Louisiana on October 24, 1944, as one of 14 children. She grew up in Arcadia, Louisiana, and moved to Los Angeles, California, in 1963. Although some sources state that Swann was in a vocal group known as The Fawns who recorded for Capitol Records in 1964, she refuted this, saying that she sang with a trio in Arcadia by that name.

In 1964, Swann started a solo singing career, changing her name to Bettye Swann at the prompting of local DJ Al Scott, who became her manager. After a minor hit with the self-penned "Don’t Wait Too Long", her big breakthrough came with "Make Me Yours", which topped the Billboard R&B chart in July 1967 and made No. 21 on the Billboard Hot 100. In 1968, she split with Scott, moved to Georgia, won a new contract with Capitol Records, and had another hit in 1969 with her cover of the Jeannie Seely hit "Don't Touch Me" (No. 14 R&B, No. 38 Hot 100).

In 1972, Swann transferred to Atlantic Records and had a pair of minor hits with "Victim of a Foolish Heart" (later covered by Joss Stone) and Merle Haggard's "Today I Started Loving You Again". After leaving Money Records she lived for a short time in Athens, Georgia. She continued to record until the mid-1970s, but with little commercial success. Her last public performance was in 1980, the year her husband and manager, George Barton, died.

Swann later changed her name to Betty Barton, began working as a teacher in the Las Vegas area, and became a Jehovah's Witness. She retired and, according to a 2005 interview, suffered from a degenerative spinal condition.

In 2015, multiple elements from Swann's 1974 recording "Kiss My Love Goodbye" were sampled in the Galantis single "Peanut Butter Jelly". In 2019, Swann's "Then You Can Tell Me Goodbye" enjoyed a resurgence of interest when it was used as the closing song in the finale of the second series of The End of the F***ing World. In 2021, the Vermont-based rapper Subtex [Zeke Kreitzer] sampled the beginning lines of Swann's 1968 song, "(My Heart Is) Closed for the Season" in his track, "Love Art Pain". In 2023, Swann's song "Little Things Mean A Lot" was used in the "Volvo EX30 – It’s the little things" commercial.

== Discography ==
=== Albums ===
- 1967: Make Me Yours (Money)
- 1969: The Soul View Now (Capitol) - R&B #48
- 1969: Don't You Ever Get Tired of Hurting Me (Capitol)
- 1990: Sweet Dreams (Capitol)
- 2001: The Money Recordings (Kent)
- 2004: Bettye Swann (Astralwerks/Honest Jon's)
- 2014: The Complete Atlantic Recordings (Rhino)
- 2015: The Very Best of Bettye Swann (Kent)

=== Singles ===
Year	Title	Chart positions	
Year	Title	US	US R&B
1964	"Don't Wait Too Long"	—	27
1965	"The Man That Said No"	—	—
1966	"The Heartache Is Gone"	—	—
1967	"Make Me Yours"	21	1
1967	"Fall in Love with Me"	67	36
1968	"Don't Look Back"	—	—
1968	"Don't Take My Mind"	—	—
1968	"I'm Lonely For You"	—	—
1969	"Don't Touch Me"	38	14
1969	"Angel of the Morning"	—	—
1969	"Don't You Ever Get Tired (Of Hurting Me)"	—	—
1970	"Little Things Mean a Lot"	—	—
1970	"Don't Let It Happen to Us"	—	—
1971	"I'm Just Living a Lie"	—	—
1972	"Victim of a Foolish Heart"	63	16
1973	"'Til I Get It Right"	—	88
1973	"Today I Started Loving You Again"	46	26
1974	"The Boy Next Door"	—	71
1974	"Time to Say Goodbye"	—	—
1975	"All the Way In or All the Way Out"	—	83
1976	"Storybook Children" (with Sam Dees)	—	84
1976	"Heading in the Right Direction"	—	—
"—" denotes releases that did not chart.
