= The Definition of Soul =

Studio album by Solomon Burke
- Released: 1997
- Label: Pointblank
- Producer: Selassie Burke; Solomon Burke

Solomon Burke chronology
Live at the House of the Blues (1994)	The Definition of Soul (1997)	Not by Water but Fire This Time (1999)

The Definition of Soul is a studio album by African-American preacher and gospel musician Solomon Burke. It was produced by Burke and his son, Selassie, and was released in 1997 via Pointblank Records.

The album was a nominee for Soul/Blues Album of the year during the 19th Blues Music Awards.

== Critical reception ==
Paul Verna, writing for Billboard, praised the album, calling it "delightful", a return to form, and stating that "despite overly polished production that threatens to undermine the grit in his sound, Burke's top-notch songwriting, [sic] husky tenor, and all-around charm take center stage". Dave Marsh, writing for The New Rolling Stone Album Guide, was more critical, calling the album a "misstep" and a "ham-handed attempt at social commentary", while calling Burke "out of his element".

Eric Fidler, writing for the Associated Press, stated that the album was "worth checking out", praising the songwriting but criticizing its "overly polished" production. AllMusic called it "a '90s spin on [sic] [Burke's] classic sound." They noted that "gritty soul remains Burke's forte, and he proves it every chance he gets", while staying that it was "another classic you can add to the Solomon Burke canon."
