= Betty Harris =

American soul singer (born 1939)

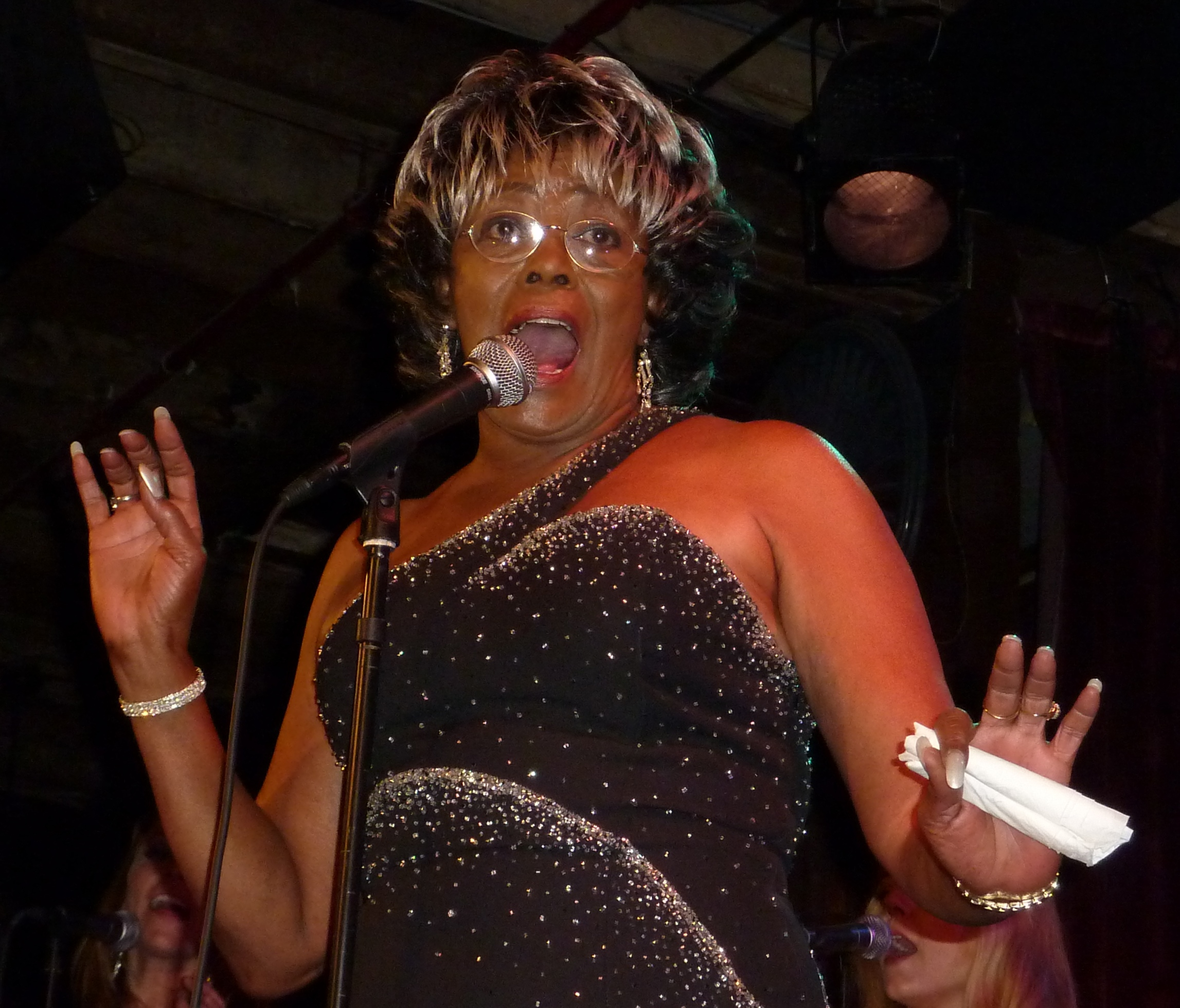
- Harris at the Brooklyn Soul Festival, 2010

Background information
- Born: 1939 (age 86–87); Orlando, Florida, United States
- Genres: Soul music, southern soul
- Occupation: Soul singer
- Instrument: Vocals
- Years active: 1963–1970; 2005–present
- Labels: Jubilee, Sansu

Betty Harris (born September 9, 1939 in Orlando, Florida, United States) is an American soul singer. Her recording career in the 1960s produced three hit singles that made the U.S. Billboard R&B and Billboard Hot 100 charts: "Cry to Me" (1963), "His Kiss" (1964) and "Nearer to You" (1967). However, her reputation among soul music connoisseurs far exceeds her commercial success of the 1960s, and her recordings for the Jubilee and Sansu record labels are highly sought after in the 2000s by fans of Southern Soul, Northern soul and deep soul.

== Career ==
In 1963, after being in the music business for a few years, Betty Harris recorded a slowed-down version of Solomon Burke's hit of the year before, "Cry to Me", produced by the original record's producer, Bert Berns, and released on the Jubilee record label. Harris's rendition turned the song into a Billboard Hot 100 number 23 hit, with a corresponding number 10 listing on the R&B chart, and it became a deep soul classic. Three further singles, including a reissue of "Cry to Me", were released on Jubilee, also produced by Bert Berns, with "His Kiss", which was released on January 4, 1964, another deep soul ballad, reaching the lower part of the Billboard Pop and R&B charts.

In 1964, Betty Harris switched record labels to Sansu, a New Orleans label, where she was produced by Allen Toussaint. Her recording with Sansu produced ten singles. Of those, only "Nearer to You", an atmospheric, dramatic soul ballad, now considered one of the milestones of deep soul, achieved U.S. national chart success (Billboard number 85). However, practically all of her recordings for Sansu, uptempo tunes and ballads alike, featuring Toussaint's raw yet sophisticated Southern soul arrangements behind Harris's rich, distinctive vocal, are considered prime specimens of the classic soul era; some notable recordings were "I'm Evil Tonight", a beat ballad favored in Northern soul circles; "I Don't Want to Hear It", "Show It" and "Twelve Red Roses", stirring up-tempo tracks; and "Can't Last Much Longer" and "What'd I Do Wrong", emotive deep soul ballads.

Harris retired from performing in 1970 to raise a family.

All of the Sansu recordings were compiled into an album released in the UK (but not the U.S.) in 1969, called Soul Perfection, an album which, in its vinyl format, although not extremely rare, commands prices of $200 to $300 today.

A comprehensive CD compilation of Harris's recordings, titled Soul Perfection Plus, was released in 1999 by the UK reissue label Westside.

In 2005, Harris returned to the music industry after a long absence. Betty has been in a decades-long copyright battle over the ownership of her music. Allen Toussaint and Marshall Sehorn never paid her the royalties due her, and she owns the sound recording copyrights for all the songs she recorded with Sansu, including "Nearer to You."

She has made several public appearances in the U.S. and Europe, including the 2007 Porretta Soul Festival in Italy, and has recorded a new album, Intuition.

Harris toured Australia in 2006 and appeared on the TV show RocKwiz, where she performed "Cry to Me", and a duet of "Love Lots of Lovin'" with the Australian singer John Paul Young.

== Discography ==
=== U.S. singles ===
Year	Title (A-side)	Title (B-side)	Record label	Catalogue reference
1962	"Taking Care of Business"	"Yesterday's Kisses"	Douglas	104
1963	"Cry to Me"	"I'll Be a Liar"	Jubilee	5456
1964	"His Kiss"	"It's Dark Outside"	Jubilee	5465
1964	"Mo Jo Hannah"	"Now Is the Hour"	Jubilee	5480
1965	"What a Sad Feeling"	"I'm Evil Tonight"	Sansu	450
1966	"I Don't Want to Hear It"	"Sometime"	Sansu	452
1966	"12 Red Roses"	"What'd I Do Wrong"	Sansu	455
1967	"Lonely Hearts"	"Bad Luck"	Sansu	461
1967	"Nearer to You"	"I'm Evil Tonight"	Sansu	466
1967	"Can't Last Much Longer"	"I'm Gonna Git Ya"	Sansu	471
1968	"Love Lots of Lovin'" (with Lee Dorsey)	"Take Care of Our Love" (with Lee Dorsey)	Sansu	474
1968	"Mean Man"	"What'd I Do Wrong"	Sansu	478
1968	"Hook, Line 'n' Sinker"	"Show It"	Sansu	479
1968	"Ride Your Pony"	"Trouble with My Lover"	Sansu	480
1969	"There's a Break in the Road"	"All I Want Is You"	SSS International	766

=== Albums ===
Year	Title	Record label
2007	Intuition	Evidence

==== Vinyl compilations ====
Year	Title	Record label	Catalogue reference
1969	Soul Perfection	Action (UK)	ACLP 6007
1980	In the Saddle	Charly (UK)	CRB 1002

==== CD compilations ====
Year	Title	Record label	Catalogue reference
1999	Soul Perfection Plus	Westside (UK)	WESA 807
2005	The Lost Soul Queen	Aim (Australia)	AIM 1502 CD
2016	The Lost Queen of New Orleans Soul	Soul Jazz (UK)	SJR 345
