= Nothing's Impossible =

Studio album by Solomon Burke
- Released: April 6, 2010
- Recorded: 2009
- Studio: Willie Mitchell's Royal Studios, Memphis, Tennessee, US
- Genre: Soul
- Length: 49:39
- Language: English
- Label: E1 Music
- Producer: Willie Mitchell

Solomon Burke chronology
Like a Fire (2008)	Nothing's Impossible (2010)	Hold On Tight (2010)

"I'll never get a chance to do this again... this opportunity that I had to work with the world's greatest producers, arrangers, writers and musicians."

—Burke on recording Nothing's Impossible with Willie Mitchell.

Nothing's Impossible is a 2010 studio album by American soul musician Solomon Burke, his last recording of original material prior to his death. The recording received positive reviews from critics.

== Reception ==
Editors at AllMusic rated this album 4 out of 5 stars, with critic Mark Deming writing that "it's all but impossible to make a bad record with Solomon Burke" and that "one listen to Nothing's Impossible confirms that [producer Willie] Mitchell's instincts were right on the money" to make "rich, strong, and gospel-influenced R&B that's sturdy enough to support Burke's earth-shaking vocals while giving the star of the show enough room to move comfortably" and that results in "R&B that's smart, passionate, and powerful, and proves the King of Rock and Soul still rules his kingdom with a sure hand". Darryl Easlea of BBC Music summed up his review that "for his final work, Willie Mitchell found a perfect partner, and Nothing’s Impossible sees him depart on a high". A piece in Billboard by Ilya Skripnikov characterized this release, "with themes of love, loneliness and longing, Burke’s raw emotional delivery and Mitchell’s rich arrangements ensure that the music penetrates to the heart and soul". Steve Slagg of PopMatters rated Nothing's Impossible a 6 out of 10, stating that it is "powerful stuff" that is "a tribute to two great musical talents, still playing at the top of their game after so many years" but "it’s nowhere near as vital as either the early works it’s drawing on or the late-career exploration it’s following". Rolling Stone's Will Hermes rated this album 3 out of 5 stars, stating that Burke "has been on a revival roll since 2002's Don't Give Up On Me" and that "Mitchell's arrangements recall his best work with Al Green". Writing for Slant Magazine, Johnathan Keefe rated this album 3.5 out of 5 stars, praising the musicianship but criticizing some tracks as weaker, stating that "it’s impressive, if not exactly surprising, that he elevates some middling songs through sheer conviction and the awesome power of his voice".

== Track listing ==
1. "Oh What a Feeling" (Julius Bradley, Spencer Randolph, and Willie Mitchell) – 3:55
2. "Everything About You" (Solomon Burke) – 3:38
3. "Dreams" (Burke and Mitchell) – 6:15
4. "Nothing's Impossible" (Jason Hohenberg and Mitchell) – 3:18
5. "It Must Be Love" (Hohenberg and Mitchell) – 5:02
6. "You Needed Me" (Randy Goodrum) – 3:46
7. "Say You Love Me Too" (Mitchell) – 3:23
8. "You're Not Alone" (S. Burke) – 4:03
9. "New Company" (Bradley and Mitchell) – 3:11
10. "When You're Not Here" (Earl Randle and Mitchell) – 4:28
11. "The Error of My Ways" (Candy Burke and Willie Mitchell) – 5:08
12. "I'm Leavin'" (Randolph and Mitchell) – 3:32

== Personnel ==
- Solomon Burke – vocals
- Greg Calbi – audio mastering
- Bill Carpenter – liner notes
- Ron Franklin – assistant audio engineering
- Daunielle "Pie" Hill – backing vocals on "You Needed Me"
- Mabon "Teenie" Hodges – guitar on "Everything About You" and "Dreams"
- Jason Hohenberg – assistant audio engineering
- Chris Jackson – recording
- Jackie Johnson – backing vocals on "You Needed Me"
- Bobby Manuel – guitar on "Oh What a Feeling", "Nothing's Impossible", "It Must Be Love", "You Needed Me", "Say You Love Me Too", "You're Not Alone", "New Company", "When You're Not Here", "The Error of My Ways", and "I'm Leavin'"; guitar solo on "You're Not Alone"
- Susan Marshall – backing vocals on "You Needed Me"
- Lannie McMillan – saxophone on "Everything About You", "Nothing's Impossible", "It Must Be Love", "New Company", "When You're Not Here", "The Error of My Ways", and "I'm Leavin'"
- The Memphis Strings – strings on "Oh What a Feeling", "Dreams" "Nothing's Impossible", "It Must Be Love", "You Needed Me", "Say You Love Me Too", "New Company", "When You're Not Here", and "The Error of My Ways"
- Archie Mitchell – congas on "Nothing's Impossible" and "New Company", assistant audio engineering
- Lawrence "Boo" Mitchell – audio engineering, mixing
- Willie Mitchell – horn and string arrangement, production
- Steve Potts – drums
- Spencer Randolph – backing vocals on "It Must Be Love" and "Say You Love Me Too"
- Lester Snell – organ; piano on "Nothing's Impossible", "It Must Be Love", "When You're Not Here", and "The Error of My Ways"; electric piano on "You Needed Me", "Say You Love Me Too", and "New Company"; Wurlitzer on "It Must Be Love", and "I'm Leavin'"; horn and string arrangement; orchestra conducting
- The Royal Horns – horns on "Everything About You", "Dreams", "Nothing's Impossible", "It Must Be Love", "You're Not Alone", "New Company", "When You're Not Here", "The Error of My Ways", and "I'm Leavin'"
- Dave Smith – bass guitar

== See also ==
- 2010 in American music
- List of 2010 albums
