= Make Me Yours =

"Make Me Yours" is a 1967 song written by Bettye Swann (Betty Jean Champion) and produced by Arthur Wright, which became a crossover hit for the Louisiana-born Swann. The single went to number one on the Billboard "Hot R&B" chart for two weeks in July 1967 and also peaked at number twenty-one on the pop singles chart.

== Chart positions ==
Chart (1967)	Peak position
U.S. Billboard Hot 100	21
U.S. Billboard Hot R&B Singles	1

== Other versions ==
The song has been recorded by several artists:

- Z.Z. Hill recorded it as an album cut for his 1967 release, A Whole Lot of Soul
- In 1968, Mary Wells, covered it on her album, Servin' Up Some Soul
- Ann Peebles on 1969 album, This is Ann Peebles
- In 1979, Denise LaSalle covered as part of a medley with ""Precious, Precious" and "Trapped by a Thing Called Love", on her album, Unwrapped
- In 1979, Jackie Moore released it as single, peaking at #72 on the US, R&B chart
- Motown group, High Inergy for their 1980 album Hold On from which it was the sole single release peaking at #68 R&B.
- Vaneese Thomas on her Soul Sister Vol 1 CD in 2009
- Syleena Johnson on herRebirth of Soul CD in 2017.
