= Hold On Tight (Solomon Burke and De Dijk album) =

Studio album by Solomon Burke and De Dijk
- Released: September 30, 2010
- Recorded: 2010
- Studio: ICP Recording Studios, Brussel, Belgium
- Genre: Soul
- Length: 54:36
- Language: English
- Label: Universal Music Group
- Producer: Antonie Broek; Huub van der Lubbe; J. B. Meijers

Solomon Burke chronology
Nothing's Impossible (2010)	Hold On Tight (2010)	Last Great Concert (2012)

De Dijk chronology
Brussel (2008)	Hold On Tight (2010)	Scherp de zeis (2011)

Hold On Tight is a 2010 collaborative album between American soul musician Solomon Burke and Dutch rock group De Dijk. Released via Universal Music Group, it was the last recording of Burke's life, featuring English lyrics to existing De Dijk songs, and has received a positive reception from critics.

== Reception ==
Editors at AllMusic Guide scored this album four out of five stars, with reviewer Mark Deming noting that "the last album he finished before [Burke] death confirmed he was in full command of his talents right up to the end" and the collaboration with De Dijk "an inspired musical match". Jesse Caldano of Slant Magazine called Hold On Tight "a reasonable terminus for the singer’s oeuvre, representing both his worldwide appeal and an expansion of the positives and negatives that always defined his work", noting that his "palpable geniality and warmth remain" even though his voice has suffered in age and ill health; he calls De Dijk's backing competent and deferential writing that there was "not much challenging or exciting about this album, which ends up sounding like a lethargic victory lap" and giving the release 2.5 out of five stars. In The Financial Times, Ludovic Hunter-Tilney scored this release three out of five stars, calling this "a genial collection of barroom soul, played with warmth by a tight band and sung with stately power by the veteran soulman" that serves as a "sturdily enjoyable memorial".

== Track listing ==
1. "Hold On Tight" (Antonie Broek, Solomon Burke, Pim Kops, Huub van der Lubbe, and Wouter Planteijdt) – 5:27
2. "My Rose Saved from the Street" (Nico Arzbach, Solomon Burke, Huub van der Lubbe, and Wouter Planteijdt) – 3:35
3. "What a Woman" (Antonie Broek, Solomon Burke, Hans van der Lubbe, Huub van der Lubbe, and Wouter Planteijdt) – 3:22
4. "No One" (Nico Arzbach, Solomon Burke, Huub van der Lubbe, and Wouter Planteijdt) – 5:24
5. "More Beauty" (Solomon Burke, Huub van der Lubbe, Wouter Planteijdt, and Jan Robijns) – 3:49
6. "I Gotta Be with You" (Nico Arzbach, Antonie Broek, Solomon Burke, Huub van der Lubbe, and Wouter Planteijdt) – 4:29
7. "Seventh Heaven" (Nico Arzbach, Antonie Broek, Solomon Burke, Huub van der Lubbe, and Wouter Planteijdt) – 4:58
8. "Good for Nothing" (Antonie Broek, Solomon Burke, Pim Kops, Huub van der Lubbe, and Wouter Planteijdt) – 5:03
9. "Text Me" (Solomon Burke and J. B. Meijers) – 4:50
10. "Don’t Despair" (Nico Arzbach, Antonie Broek, Solomon Burke, Pim Kops, Huub van der Lubbe, and Wouter Planteijdt) – 5:15
11. "The Bend" (Solomon Burke, Hans van der Lubbe, Huub van der Lubbe, and Wouter Planteijdt) – 5:00
12. "Perfect Song" (Nico Arzbach, Roland Brunt, Solomon Burke, Huub van der Lubbe, and Wouter Planteijdt) – 3:30

== Personnel ==
- Solomon Burke – vocals, liner notes

De Dijk

- Nico Arzbach – acoustic guitar, electric guitar, mandolin
- Antonie Broek – drums, production
- Pim Kops – piano, accordion, acoustic guitar, Hammond organ, design, photography
- Hans van der Lubbe – bass guitar
- Huub van der Lubbe – acoustic guitar, production
- J. B. Meijers – electric guitar, acoustic guitar, trombone, recording, mixing, production

Additional personnel

- Bob Bronshoff – photography
- Roland Brunt – saxophone
- Phil Delire – recording
- Michel "Shelle" Dierickx – recording
- Frans Hendriks – mastering
- Jools Holland – piano on "What a Woman", liner notes
- Ton Homburg – design
- Peter van Soest – trumpet

== Chart performance ==
Billboard listed Hold On Tight for two weeks on the Dutch charts: entering at second place on October 23, 2010 and slipping to third on November 6.

== See also ==
- List of 2010 albums
