= Make Do with What You Got =

Studio album by Solomon Burke
- Released: March 1, 2005
- Studios: Cello Studios, Hollywood, California
- Genre: R&B
- Length: 44:12
- Labels: Shout! Factory, Sony BMG
- Producer: Don Was

Solomon Burke chronology
Don't Give Up on Me (2002)	Make Do with What You Got (2005)	Nashville (2006)

Make Do with What You Got is an album by R&B musician Solomon Burke. It was released on March 1, 2005, on the Shout! Factory and Sony BMG labels. The album was produced by Don Was and was nominated for a Grammy Award for Best Contemporary Blues Album.

== Critical reception ==
Professional ratings
Aggregate scores
Source	Rating
Metacritic	70/100
Review scores
Source	Rating
AllMusic	3.5/5 stars
The Encyclopedia of Popular Music	2/5 stars
Entertainment Weekly	A–
The Guardian	5/5 stars
NOW	4/5
Paste	4/5 stars
PopMatters	4/10
Rolling Stone	3.5/5 stars
Uncut	3/5

Make Do with What You Got received mostly favorable reviews from music critics. AllMusic critic Mark Deming praised Burke's vocal ability while also criticizing Was's production.

== Track listing ==
No.	Title	Writer(s)	Length
1.	"I Need Your Love in My Life"	Coco Montoya, Dave Steen	4:19
2.	"What Good Am I?"	Bob Dylan	3:40
3.	"It Makes No Difference"	Robbie Robertson	5:27
4.	"Let Somebody Love Me"	Vernon Bullock, Freddie Gorman, Ivy Jo Hunter	4:28
5.	"After All These Years"	Solomon Burke, Eddie Towns	4:37
6.	"Fading Footsteps"	David Egan	3:59
7.	"At the Crossroads"	Van Morrison	4:58
8.	"I Got the Blues"	Mick Jagger, Keith Richards	4:11
9.	"Make Do With What You Got"	Dr. John	4:34
10.	"Wealth Won't Save Your Soul"	Hank Williams	3:59
Total length:			44:12

== Personnel ==
- Guitar: Ray Parker Jr., Reggie Young. Pedal Steel: Robby Turner
- Bass: Tommy Sims
- Keyboards: Rudy Copeland, Jamie Muhoberac, Eddie Towns
- Drums: James Gadson
- Saxophone: Joe Sublett
- Trumpet: Darrell Leonard
- Backing Vocals: Sweet Pea Atkinson, Portia Griffin, Monalisa Young
