= De Dijk =

Dutch rock band (1981–2022)

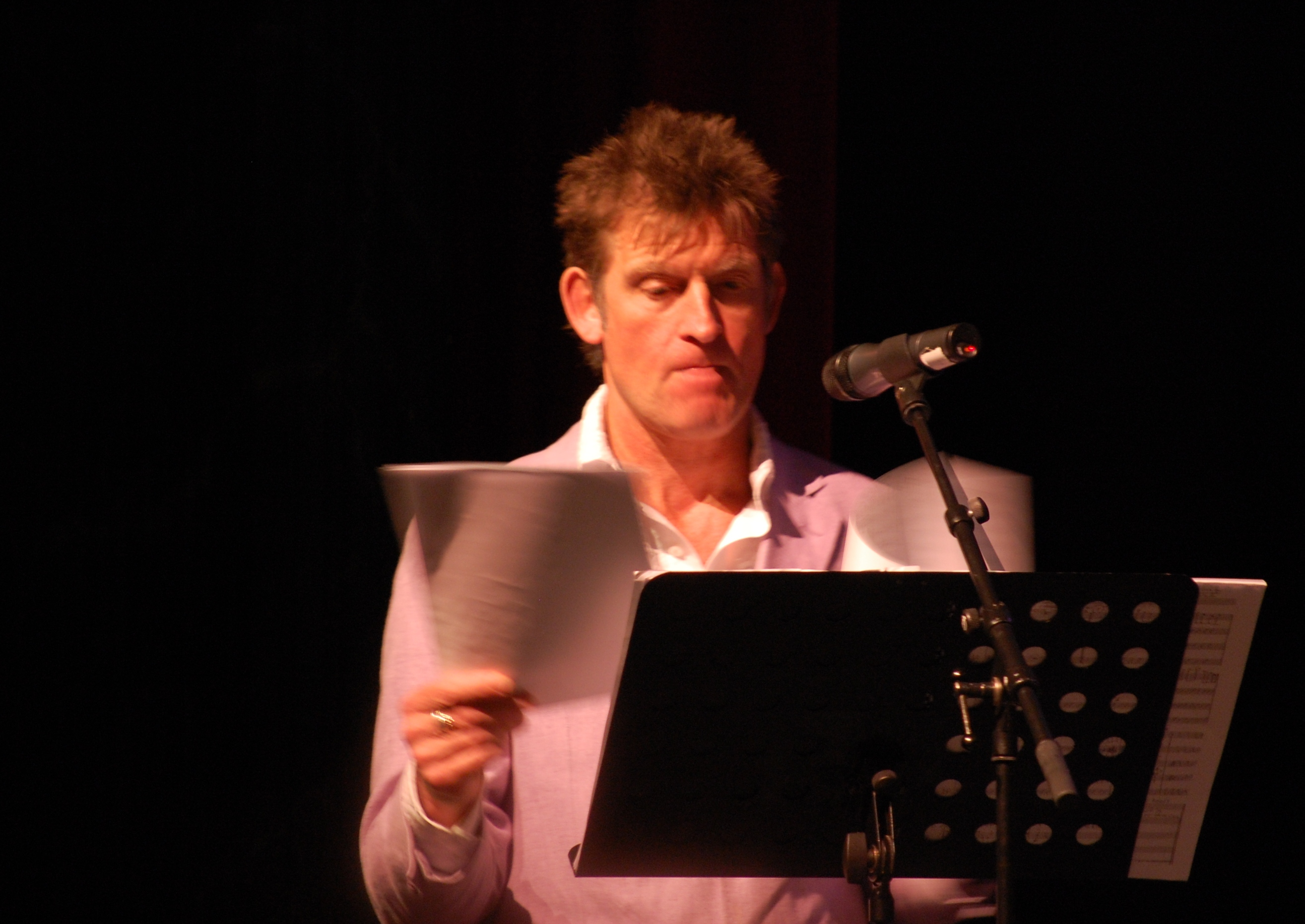
- Lead singer Huub van der Lubbe

Background information
- Origin: Amsterdam, Netherlands
- Genres: Rock, soul, rhythm & blues
- Years active: 1981–2022
- Labels: Dureco, Telstar, Phonogram, Universal
- Members: Huub van der Lubbe; Hans van der Lubbe; Nico Arzbach; Antonie Broek; Pim Kops
- Past members: Bert Stelder; Daniel Derks; Christian Muiser; Mike Booth
- Website: www.dedijk.nl

De Dijk (English: The Dike) were a Dutch rock band existing from 1981 to 2022. The band were named after Zeedijk, a street in their hometown Amsterdam. Their music can be described as a mixture of soul, blues and rock 'n roll, with lyrics sung only in Dutch, except for their 2010 album Hold On Tight; the song Enough is Enough, both of which are sung in English by Solomon Burke; and Stupid Guy from the album Wakker in een vreemde wereld, performed in English by the regular band.

== History ==
De Dijk were formed by Huub van der Lubbe (lead vocals), his brother Hans van der Lubbe (bass) and Nico Arzbach (guitar, originally drums). The band started in a time when Dutch language pop music became highly popular, with bands like Doe Maar, Het Goede Doel and Toontje Lager. Van der Lubbe also performs as a poet and an actor. Perhaps as a consequence, the band appealed to all ages rather than just teenagers. In late 1988 they released Niemand in de Stad, their most successful album so far. The 1990s saw the emergence of a new generation of Dutch-language bands (notably Van Dik Hout and Bløf) who cited De Dijk as a main influence.

On 1 June 2022 Huub van der Lubbe announced his departure from De Dijk. At 69, he felt that the time had come to slow down and focus on other projects. The band played their last show in December 2022. A year later, Van der Lubbe made his musical-debut playing the starring role in De Man van La Mancha.

== Members ==
Today De Dijk are:

- Huub van der Lubbe (vocals)
- Hans van der Lubbe (bass guitar)
- Nico Arzbach (guitar)
- Antonie Broek (drums & production)
- Pim Kops (keyboards, accordion, guitar)

On stage they are accompanied by:

- Roland Brunt (saxophone)
- Peter van Soest (trumpet)
- Jelle Broek (guitar)

Former members:

- JB Meijers (guitar)

== Discography ==
- De Dijk (1982) – The Dike
- Nooit meer Tarzan (1983) – No More Tarzan
- Elke dag een nieuwe hoed (1985) – Each Day a New Hat
- Wakker in een vreemde wereld (1987) – Awake in a Strange World
- Niemand in de stad (1989) – Nobody in Town
- Live (1990) – Live
- Nooit genoeg (1991) – Never Enough
- Zeven levens (1992) – Seven Lives
- De blauwe schuit (1994) – The Blue Barge
- De stand van de maan (1997) – The Position of the Moon
- Voor de tover (1998) – For the Magic
- Het beste van (1998) – The Best of
- Zevende hemel (2000) – Seventh Heaven
- Muzikanten dansen niet (2002) – Musicians Don't Dance
- Door (2003) – Onward
- Later is nu (2005) – Later Is Now
- Zullen we dansen (2006) – Shall We Dance
- We beginnen pas (2006) – We Have Just Started
- Brussel (2008) – Brussels
- Hold On Tight (2010, collaboration with Solomon Burke)
- Scherp de Zeis (2011) – Sharpen the Scythe
- Allemansplein (2014) – Everyman's Square
- Groef (2017) – Groove
- Nu of Nou (2019) – Now or Currently
- De Dijk in Paradiso (2021)

== Awards ==
- 1987 – Zilveren Harp (Silver Harp) – Most promising new Dutch act
- 1993 – Gouden Harp (Golden Harp) – For their large contribution to Dutch music
- 1995 – Edison Music Award – Best Dutch rock album (De Blauwe Schuit)
- 2005 – Edison Music Award – For their entire work
- 2008 – Popprijs (Pop Prize) – For the album Brussels (and for their entire work)
