= A Little Bit of Soap =

Single by the Jarmels
- B-side: "The Way You Look Tonight (Swing Time)"
- Released: July 3, 1961
- Recorded: 1961
- Genre: Doo-wop
- Length: 2:13
- Label: Laurie
- Songwriter: Bert Berns (a.k.a. Bert Russell)

The Jarmels singles chronology
| "Little Lonely One" (1961) | "A Little Bit of Soap" (1961) | "I'll Follow You" (1961) |

"A Little Bit of Soap" was written by Bert Berns (a.k.a. Bert Russell), and first sung in a bluesy soul style by the Jarmels, who reached number 12 with it in September 1961 and number 7 on the R&B charts. The song has been covered by many other artists.

== Reception ==
The song was a major hit in the United States when it was first released. It reached the top ten on the Canadian charts, and the top twenty in Australia in 1970 for Paul Davis. It was his first charting single release. "A Little Bit of Soap" was a huge hit in Southeast Asia when the Hong Kong–based group Cliff Foenander and the Fabulous Echoes released it as a single. It spent 25 weeks at number 1 in top ten charts in 1963 in Southeast Asia. Foenander and the Fabulous Echoes also sang the hit in Las Vegas in 1964. It made Cliff Foenander a household name in South Asia: Radio Ceylon, the oldest radio station in South Asia, played the number 1 hit across the Indian subcontinent.

== Cover versions ==
- Garnet Mimms' 1964 remake of "A Little Bit of Soap", produced by Jerry Ragovoy, reached number 95 on the Billboard Hot 100 in January 1965.
- The song's composer Bert Berns (who wrote many hits including The Beatles classic "Twist and Shout"), produced a 1965 redo for the Exciters which reached number 58 on the Billboard Hot 100 in February 1966.
- Paul Davis redid the song in 1970, recorded at Muscle Shoals Sound Studio. This version, co-produced by Davis with Bert Berns' widow Ilene Berns, reached number 52 on the Billboard Hot 100 in the summer of 1970.
- The Pioneers released a reggae version of "A Little Bit of Soap" in 1973 on Trojan Records.
- Nigel Olsson's version hit number 34 on the Billboard Hot 100 and number 9 on the Adult Contemporary chart in June 1979. The versions by the Exciters, Paul Davis and Nigel Olsson were all recorded for Bang Records, the label which Bert Berns had founded in 1965.
- Showaddywaddy released a version of "A Little Bit of Soap" in 1978, affording the song its sole appearance on the UK Singles Chart as it reached No. 5 in July 1978.
- Daniel Johnston also covered it.

== Samples ==
- De La Soul sampled it for a different song with the same name, featured on their debut album, 3 Feet High and Rising.
