= The Jarmels =

American doo wop rhythm and blues band

- Origin: Richmond, Virginia
- Genres: Doo wop, rhythm and blues
- Years active: 1959–1969
- Label: Laurie Records
- Past members: Nathaniel Ruff; Paul Burnett; Earl Christian; Tom Eldridge; Ray Smith

The Jarmels were an American doo wop rhythm and blues group formed in 1959 in Richmond, Virginia best known for their only hit, 1961’s "A Little Bit of Soap".

== Career ==
The start of their big break came in 1960 when they were at a local (Richmond) venue where Ben E. King was appearing, and they met him. King invited them to travel to New York City and meet with various record companies, including Laurie Records. The Cherokees impressed Laurie after auditioning with King's signature song, "Stand By Me", and became the first African-American group that Laurie signed. The group was renamed the Jarmels after a street in Harlem, New York.

Jim Gribble, who had previously worked with The Mystics and The Passions, was assigned as manager of the Jarmels. In early 1961, they released the single "Little Lonely One", which did not find much success outside New York. However, their second single, "A Little Bit of Soap", reached number 12 in America on the Billboard chart in June of the same year. The flip side of the recording was "The Way You Look Tonight", a song featured in the film Swing Time and originally performed by Fred Astaire. It won the Academy Award for Best Original Song in 1936. "Soap" proved to be the only hit single for the Jarmels; the next four singles, including "Just the Way You Look Tonight" and a remake of the 1935 Bing Crosby hit "Red Sails in the Sunset" did not chart at all.

The group continued to perform throughout the 1960s, recording a remake of "Come On, Girl" in 1963. There were several personnel changes, notably the addition of Major Harris, who would later go on to join the Delfonics. The group disbanded in 1969.

== Members ==
The group was composed of:

- Nathaniel Ruff (July 7, 1940 – April 15, 1997)
- Jesse "Paul" Burnett (July 28, 1943 – March 23, 2001)
- Ray Smith (born 1941)
- Earl Christian (February 27, 1942 – April 21, 1968)
- Thomas Eldridge (October 23, 1940 – June 19, 2000).

== Discography ==
=== Singles ===
Year	Song	Peak chart positions	
Year	Song	US Pop	US R&B
1961	"Little Lonely One"	—	―
1961	"A Little Bit Of Soap"	12	7
1961	"I'll Follow You"	—	―
1961	"She Loves to Dance"	—	―
1962	"Red Sails in the Sunset"	—	―
1962	"Little Bug"	—	―
1963	"Come On, Girl"	—	―
"—" denotes releases that did not chart.
