= Solomon Burke =

American preacher and singer (1940–2010)

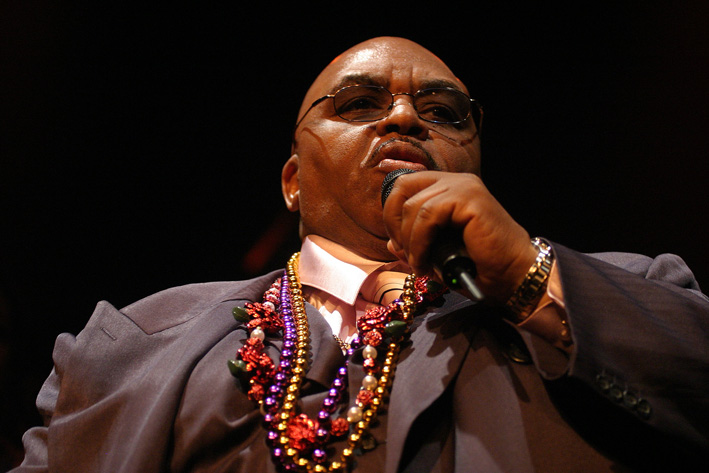
- Burke in 2008

Background information
- Born: James Solomon McDonald; March 21, 1940; Philadelphia, Pennsylvania, U.S.
- Died: October 10, 2010 (aged 70) Haarlemmermeer, Netherlands
- Genres: Blues; gospel; rhythm and blues; soul; rock and roll; southern soul
- Occupations: Preacher; singer
- Instruments: Vocals; guitar
- Years active: 1955–2010
- Labels: Apollo; Atlantic; Bell; MGM; ABC Dunhill; Chess; Savoy; Rounder; Fat Possum; ANTI-; Shout! Factory; E1

Solomon Vincent McDonald Burke (born James Solomon McDonald; March 21, 1940 – October 10, 2010) was an American singer who shaped the sound of rhythm and blues as one of the founding fathers of soul music in the 1960s. He has been called "a key transitional figure bridging R&B and soul", and was known for his "prodigious output".

He had a string of hits including "Cry to Me", "If You Need Me", "Got to Get You Off My Mind", "Down in the Valley", and "Everybody Needs Somebody to Love". Burke was referred to honorifically as "King Solomon", the "King of Rock 'n' Soul", "Bishop of Soul", and the "Muhammad Ali of Soul". Due to his minimal chart success in comparison to other soul music greats such as James Brown, Wilson Pickett, and Otis Redding, Burke has been described as the genre's "most unfairly overlooked singer" of its golden age. Atlantic Records executive Jerry Wexler referred to Burke as "the greatest male soul singer of all time".

Burke's most famous recordings, which spanned five years in the early 1960s, bridged the gap between mainstream R&B and grittier R&B. Burke was "a singer whose smooth, powerful articulation and mingling of sacred and profane themes helped define soul music in the early 1960s." He drew from his roots—gospel, jazz, country, and blues—as well as developing his own style at a time when R&B, and rock were both still in their infancy. Described as both "Rabelaisian" and also as a "spiritual enigma", "perhaps more than any other artist, the ample figure of Solomon Burke symbolized the ways that spirituality and commerce, ecstasy and entertainment, sex and salvation, individualism and brotherhood, could blend in the world of 1960s soul music."

During the 55 years that he performed professionally, Burke released 38 studio albums on at least 17 record labels and had 35 singles that charted on the Billboard charts, including 31 singles that made the Billboard R&B charts and 26 that made the Billboard Hot 100. In 2001, Burke was inducted into the Rock and Roll Hall of Fame as a performer. His album Don't Give Up on Me won the Grammy Award for Best Contemporary Blues Album at the 45th Annual Grammy Awards in 2003. By 2005 Burke was credited with selling 17 million albums. Rolling Stone ranked Burke as No. 89 on its 2008 list of "100 Greatest Singers of All Time".

== Early life and career ==
Burke was born James Solomon McDonald on March 21, 1940 (sometimes listed as 1936 or 1939) in the upper floor of his grandmother Eleanor Moore's home, a row house in West Philadelphia. On his headstone, his birth year is 1940.

Burke was the child of Josephine Moore and an absentee father. His mother Josephine was a nurse, schoolteacher, concert performer and pastor. Burke was consecrated a bishop at birth by his grandmother in the Solomon's Temple, a congregation of the United House of Prayer for All People, which she founded at her home in Black Bottom, West Philadelphia. When Burke was nine, his mother married rabbi and butcher Vincent Burke and had his name changed to Solomon Vincent McDonald Burke. Burke's friends and family called him "Sol". Burke was the godson of Daddy Grace.

Burke credited his grandmother as his main spiritual and musical influence. He learned how to sing all forms of music from his grandmother's coaching him to listen to music on the radio. Burke began preaching at the age of seven at the Solomon's Temple. He was described in his young preaching years as a "frantic sermonizer" and "spellbinding in his delivery", and was soon nicknamed the "Boy Wonder Preacher" for his charismatic preaching in the pulpit. Burke became a pastor of the congregation at the age of 12, appeared on the radio station WDAS, and later hosted a gospel show on WHAT-AM, mixing songs and sermons in broadcasts from Solomon's Temple. On weekends he traveled with a truck and tent, to Maryland, Virginia, and the Carolinas to carry on the spiritual crusade of his church. Influenced by Superman, "the first sign of a royal persona was evident in the cape that he wore only on Sundays, made from his "blankie" by his grandmother.

Burke had six younger siblings – a sister, Laurena Burke-Corbin (born June 23, 1946), and five brothers: Elec Edward "Alec" (born February 16, 1948), Vladimir H. "Laddie" (born July 31, 1949), Mario "Chuck" (born September 13, 1953), Daniel S. "Danny" (born March 10, 1955), and Jolester R. M. Burke (born September 24, 1958). From an early age Solomon Burke worked to supplement his family's income. He recalled: "I used to deliver grocery orders in a little wagon I made out of fish boxes. When I was seven, I sold newspapers out of my own newsstand on the corner of 40th and Lancaster. I had the first 99-cent car wash, which was located at 40th and Wallace outside Al's Barber Shop. We had it there because he was the only one who would let us use his water. We could wash your car in 20 minutes. I had four or five guys, gave 'em each a nickel for each car." Another briefly held early job was as a hot dog seller at Eddie's Meat Market, where his friend Ernest Evans, later known as Chubby Checker, also worked. Burke eventually graduated from John Bartram High School. He first became a father at 14.

During high school, Burke formed and fronted the quartet, the Gospel Cavaliers. He received his first guitar from his grandmother, later writing his first song, "Christmas Presents". The Cavaliers began performing in churches. It was around this time that Burke met Kae "Loudmouth" Williams, a famed Philadelphia deejay with help from Williams' wife, Viola, who saw Burke and the Cavaliers perform at church. Before entering a gospel talent contest in which a record deal was first prize, the group split up.

Burke entered the contest, held at Cornerstone Baptist Church, as a solo artist and won the contest against eleven other competitors. Soon, several labels including Apollo, Vee-Jay Records and Peacock Records pursued the 15-year-old. Before pursuing the deal, Burke signed Kae Williams as his manager. Williams then took him to Apollo Records introducing him to Bess Berman, who signed him to the label. The move was made after Williams added four years to Burke's age, which led to confusion from the press about his age.

== Career ==
=== Early recordings ===
Burke signed with Apollo Records in late 1955, following the departure of gospel singer and the label's primary star Mahalia Jackson to Columbia. After he signed with Apollo, the label's founder Bess Berman and its handlers were reportedly trying to make Burke "the next Harry Belafonte".

Burke recorded nine singles for the label during his two-year tenure, releasing his first single, "Christmas Presents", on Christmas Eve of 1955.

He recorded with musicians including King Curtis and Lester Young. His other Apollo recordings during this early period included "I'm in Love", "I'm All Alone" and "No Man Walks Alone", later collected as his first long-player, Solomon Burke. These early records did not sell well, although the self-titled album was re-released in 1964 after Burke had experienced some chart success.

Burke gained some notoriety for the Apollo single, "You Can Run (But You Can't Hide)", which he wrote with Charles Merenstein. Due to the song's title borrowing from Joe Louis' quote, "he can run, but he can't hide", Louis was credited as co-writer. Louis helped promote the song by having Burke appear on the Steve Allen Show in early 1957. Burke was abruptly dropped from Apollo following a violent argument with manager Kae Williams over performance royalties; Burke claimed Williams had him "blackballed" from the industry following this move. After releasing a few singles for other labels, Burke briefly returned to Apollo under the pseudonym "Little Vincent", releasing one song in 1961, and the label issued a self-titled album in 1962.

Following his initial Apollo departure, Burke struggled to record or get club dates, and an argument with his mother left him homeless. He later moved into a home owned by Ohella Thompson, after Thompson accidentally hit him with her car outside a club.

During this time, Burke studied the Islamic faith and married, but the marriage was annulled. Soon afterwards, he married Delores Clark, Thompson's niece, and soon had seven children.

As his family grew, Burke trained for a while to be a mortician at Eckels College of Mortuary Science, graduating from mortuary science, and finding work at a funeral home. Burke later had his own mortuary business in Los Angeles.

Burke was briefly signed to Herb Abramson's Triumph Records. However, Burke could not record for the label because his contract with Apollo had not yet been dissolved.

In 1959, Philadelphia businessman Marvin Leonard "Babe" Chivian (1925-1972), a "body-and-fender man" and real estate speculator, offered Burke a red Lincoln Continental convertible if he would agree to a management contract with him. Chivian arranged for Burke to be signed to Singular Records, a Philadelphia-based label that was owned by WPEN disc jockey Edwin L. "Larry" Brown and vocal coach Arthur "Artie" Singer, who had a distribution deal with Chess Records. Burke released just two singles for Singular, "Doodle Dee Doo" and "This Little Ring", written by Delores Burke and Marvin Chivian"; neither song charted.

=== Work with Atlantic Records ===
In November 1960, he signed with Atlantic Records. According to Burke, he signed with the label within ten minutes of entering Jerry Wexler's office, reportedly signing a "handshake deal" with Wexler and Ahmet Ertegun.

At the time of Burke's signing, two of Atlantic Records' major stars, Bobby Darin and Ray Charles, had left the label for better deals with Capitol and ABC respectively. According to Alex Halberstadt, "Salvation arrived in the person of Solomon Burke, a soul singer of overwhelming charisma and remarkable stylistic range. ... Wexler and Burke created a string of hits that carried the label financially and represented the first fully realized examples of the classic soul sound." Burke reportedly helped keep Atlantic Records solvent from 1961 to 1965 with his steady run of hit records.

Burke recorded thirty-two singles with Atlantic, most of which hit both the pop and R&B charts. Burke's second single for the label was the country single, "Just Out of Reach (Of My Two Open Arms)", which became his first charted single, reaching No. 24 on the Billboard Hot 100 and peaking at No. 7 on the R&B charts. The song also became Burke's first million-seller. His next hit came with "Cry to Me", which reached No. 5 on the R&B chart in 1962 and was described as one of the first songs to mix country, R&B and gospel. After the release of "Cry to Me", Burke was one of the first artists to be referred to as a "soul artist". Other hits included Wilson Pickett's "If You Need Me"; "You're Good for Me"; his co-written classic, "Everybody Needs Somebody to Love"; his only number-one single, "Got to Get You Off My Mind"; and "Tonight's the Night". Burke became the first R&B artist to cover a Bob Dylan song with his cover of "Maggie's Farm", which became the B-side of "Tonight's the Night". In 1965, Atlantic released his fifth album, The Best of Solomon Burke, which peaked at No. 22 on the US charts.

==== Branding ====
Almost immediately after signing to Atlantic, Wexler and Burke clashed over his branding and the songs that he would record. According to Burke, "Their idea was, we have another young kid to sing gospel, and we're going to put him in the blues bag." As Burke had struggled from an early age with "his attraction to secular music on the one hand and his allegiance to the church on the other," when he was signed to Atlantic Records he "refused to be classified as a rhythm-and-blues singer" due to a perceived "stigma of profanity" by the church, and R&B's reputation as "the devil's music". Burke indicated in 2005: "I told them about my spiritual background, and what I felt was necessary, and that I was concerned about being labeled rhythm & blues. What kind of songs would they be giving me to sing? Because of my age, and my position in the church, I was concerned about saying things that were not proper, or that sent the wrong message. That angered Jerry Wexler a little bit. He said, 'We're the greatest blues label in the world! You should be honored to be on this label, and we'll do everything we can – but you have to work with us.'"

To mollify Burke, it was decided to market him as a singer of "soul music" after he had consulted his church brethren and won approval for the term. When a Philadelphia DJ said to Burke, "You're singing from your soul and you don't want to be an R&B singer, so what kind of singer are you going to be?", Burke shot back: "I want to be a soul singer." Burke's sound, which was especially popular in the South, was described there as "river deep country fried buttercream soul." Burke is credited with coining the term "soul music", which he confirmed in a 1996 interview.

Despite his initial reluctance, shared with several former gospel singers including Aretha Franklin and Wilson Pickett, Burke was "molded into a more secular direction when he signed with Atlantic in the '60s", and became one of "the "backsliders", artists who "preferred a secular acclaim to the gospel obscurity".

He decided eventually that "secular music was not the antithesis of the church but, rather, 'a new avenue, a new dimension to spread the gospel.'" Despite this, "leaving gospel for secular music, as well as integrating secular music into gospel performances, was controversial."

Noted blues scholar Paul Oliver maintains that when Sam Cooke and Burke "turned from gospel singing to the blues", unlike others who had done so previously, "they took the gospel technique with them"; "even the words often secularized gospel songs", and this was coupled with a "screaming delivery, the exploitation of emotional involvement, [and] the frenetic displays of dancing singers."

For Burke, "gospel influences were pervasive. Gospelly chord progressions, organ accompaniment and a style of singing which can only be described as "preaching" have now spread widely into much black popular music." Music critic Mark Deming described Burke as having: "one of the finest voices in popular music, that possessed a churchly authority that was the ideal match for his material which balanced the pleasures of the flesh with the price of the transgression."

"Burke sounded like a Baptist preacher in a country church, and for [Jerry] Wexler he was the first and possibly the greatest of all '60s soul men." Wexler, who considered Burke to be "the greatest male soul singer of all time", pronounced him a "vocalist of rare prowess and remarkable range. His voice is an instrument of exquisite sensitivity." Wexler also described the young Burke's vocal style as "churchy without being coarse."

In 2000, Wexler indicated: "Solomon was beautiful, baby. He sounded just like Dean Martin." In 2003 Wexler assessed Burke: "I rate him at the very top. Since all singing is a trade-off between music and drama, he's the master at both. His theatricality. He's a great actor." Despite his admiration for Burke, Wexler also described Burke as "a piece of work: wily, highly intelligent, a salesman of epic proportions, sly, sure-footed, a never-say-die entrepreneur", while also branding him "a card-carrying fabulist. Solomon has told so many versions of the same happening that it's unreal."

==== Impact ====
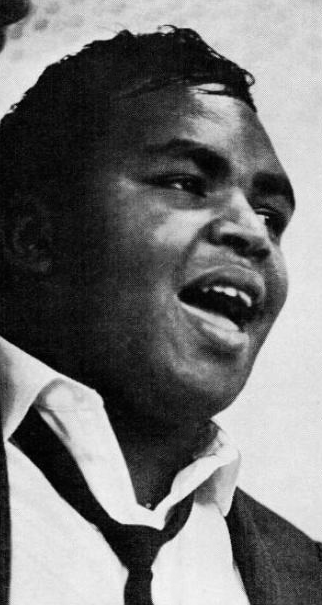
Burke in 1967

After a string of a dozen hit records, by November 1963 Burke had agreed to be crowned the "King of Rock 'n' Soul" in a ceremony at the Royal Theatre in Baltimore by local deejay Fred Robinson, known professionally as "Rockin' Robin", who also gave him a cape and crown that he always wore on stage. Burke accepted the appellation the "King of Rock 'N' Soul", indicating "without soul, there'd be no rock and without rock, there'd be no soul." The ceremony was repeated each night during the week Burke performed in Baltimore.

According to Gerri Hirshey: "Title agreed upon, Solomon added the trappings: a crown, a scepter, a cape, robe, dancing girls, and colored lights." Burke's crown was an exact replica of "the crown jewels of London" and the cape was trimmed with real ermine. Burke, whose shows were tours de force of riveting soul and unashamed hokum", "ticked every box from low comedy through country pleading to the kind of magisterial rock'n'roll that brought the house down", and he "became known as much for his showmanship as he did his voice. He would often take the stage in a flowing, 15-foot-long cape and bejeweled crown, his stage theatrics predating those of such legendary showman as James Brown. According to David Hepworth, Burke "once employed a midget who was secreted under his cape. When it was thrown off the cape would disappear stage left as of its own volition."

After the success of his "Papa's Got a Brand New Bag" in late 1965, James Brown, believing he deserved to be crowned "King of Soul", hired Burke to perform for one night in Chicago, but ended up paying not to perform but rather to watch him perform instead, expecting Burke also to surrender his crown and title to him. According to Burke, "He paid me $7,500 to stand onstage and hand him my robe and crown. It was a great gig: I got paid and I didn't have to sing a note." Burke accepted Brown's money, but retained his title and regal paraphernalia.

As he increased in weight, "Burke's sheer bulk meant that he could never be a dancer like James Brown, but like Brown, his act was full of showmanship." Consequently, over the years Burke "evolved a fervently demonstrative stage act", that were often compared with religious revival meetings. Burke and black performers like James Brown, Aretha Franklin and Wilson Pickett, "would adopt the 'house-wrecking' tactics of black preachers, and their shows functioned in much the same way as black religious events in that performer and audience became immersed in the music, arriving together at an ecstatic state that allowed them to feel a deep intensity of experience." According to Weldon McDougal, Burke "turned theatres like the Apollo and the Uptown into churches, he had folk running down the aisles to be saved by his music." Cliff White described a show in the UK where "with head thrown back and one hand cupped to his mouth like an Alpine yodeller he cried out with such overwhelming passion that he left the spellbound audience wrung out and exhausted like so many limp rags."

==== Decline with Atlantic ====
After 1965, the "biggest year of his career", Burke settled as "at best a middle-of-the-pack chart performer". Due to failing chart numbers and the rise of several performers including Aretha Franklin, Wilson Pickett and Otis Redding, Burke was described by David Cantwell in this period as "a King without a kingdom". Burke's position in Atlantic dropped by 1968 as other Atlantic artists replaced him as the label's primary artists. Burke tried to regain his early Atlantic success by recording at Memphis, working on the album I Wish I Knew at Chips Moman's American Sound Studio. The album included the songs "Get Out of My Life Woman" and a cover of "I Wish I Knew How It Would Feel to Be Free", his first recording that provided social commentary. It was later dedicated to Martin Luther King Jr., and Atlantic gave up 5% of royalties on the single to King's family. It reached only No. 32 R&B and No. 68 pop. Burke later met his next manager Tamiko Jones at the Memphis studio. Burke and Jones recorded several duets on Jones' album, I'll Be Anything for You. Following a failed collaboration with other soul artists as the Soul Clan, Burke decided to leave the label. His reasons for leaving Atlantic were for not "being treated properly" and that Atlantic "just wasn't home anymore, wasn't family".

=== Later recordings ===
After leaving Atlantic, Burke signed with Bell Records where he released five singles in the next eighteen months. In 1969 he had a small hit with his second release for Bell, a reworking of Creedence Clearwater Revival's "Proud Mary" b/w "What Am I Living For" (Bell 783). This was co-produced by Tamiko Jones, who was being rehabilitated after a bout of polio, and was at the time Burke's manager. Burke recorded a cover of "Proud Mary" prior to Ike & Tina Turner's version, and according to Burke was the one who convinced the duo to record it. The song became a brief hit reaching No. 15 R&B and No. 45 pop. All but four of the tracks Burke recorded during an 18-month stay with Bell Records were packaged on the Proud Mary LP. After this album and the two following singles—his own "Generation of Revelations", and the Mac Davis song "In the Ghetto", which had previously been a hit for Elvis Presley—failed to chart, his contract was not renewed.

Through the efforts of his manager, Buddy Glee, by November 1970 Burke signed with Mike Curb's MGM label, and formed MBM Productions, his own production company. Burke's record debut for MGM, "Lookin' Out My Back Door", another Creedence Clearwater Revival song, had disappointing sales. His first MGM album, Electronic Magnetism, also failed to chart. In 1972 Burke had a No. 13 R&B hit for MGM with "Love Street and Fool's Road" (MGM 14353). In 1972, he recorded the soundtrack to two films, Cool Breeze and Hammer. He left MGM for ABC-Dunhill Records in 1974, recording the album, I Have a Dream, which produced the No. 14 R&B hit, "Midnight and You". By 1975 Burke was signed to Chess Records. He recorded two albums for Chess: Music to Make Love By and Back to My Roots, and had a top 20 R&B hit in 1975 with "You And Your Baby Blues". However, his follow-up single "Let Me Wrap My Arms Around You" reached only No. 72 on the R&B chart. In 1978 Burke released an album Please Don't Say Goodbye To Me, which was produced by Jerry "Swamp Dogg" Williams, though Amherst Records. On September 23, 1978, Burke charted for the 31st and last time when "Please Don't Say Goodbye to Me" reached No. 91 on the R&B chart. He released the album Sidewalks, Fences and Walls on Infinity Records in 1979 (reissued as Let Your Love Flow in 1993 by Shanachie Records).

Between 1979 and 1984, Burke recorded four gospel albums for Savoy Records, starting with the album, Lord I Need a Miracle Right Now. He was nominated for his first Grammy in the Best Male Gospel Soul category for his rendition of "Precious Lord, Take My Hand", but complained later that he did not receive royalties from his Savoy work. He then recorded for smaller labels such as Rounder, MCI/Isis, Bizarre/Straight, Black Top, Pointblank and GTR Records. Burke was inducted into the Rock and Roll Hall of Fame on March 19, 2001, in New York City by Mary J. Blige, after eight previous nominations since 1986.

=== Final recordings ===
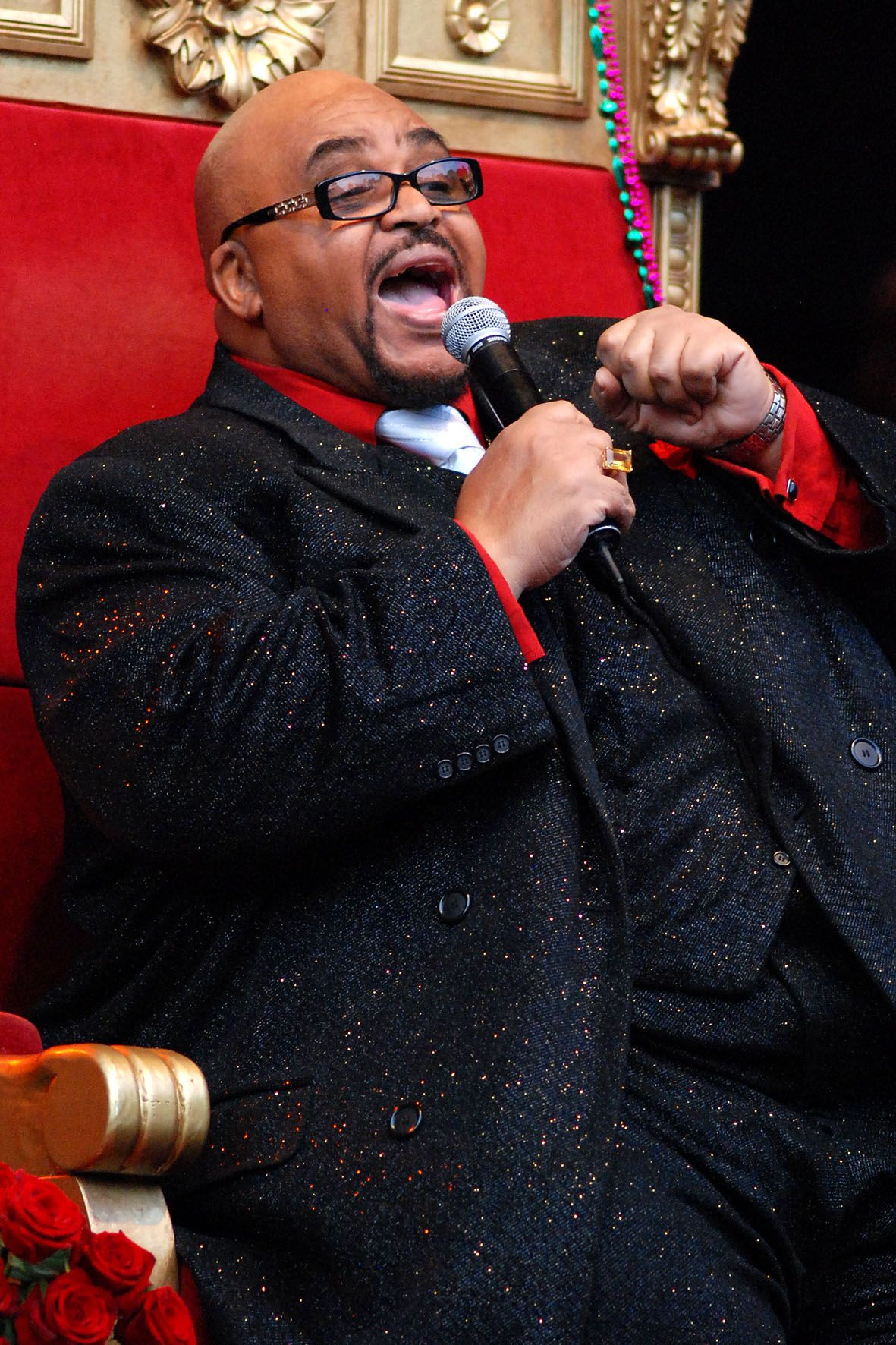
Burke in 2010

In 2002, Burke signed with Fat Possum Records and released the album, Don't Give Up on Me. Many of the songs were previously unreleased tunes, some written for him by top writers including Tom Waits, with whom he had a discussion over whether to sing about a mint julep, which was against Solomon's principles at the time. Burke agreed to sing the line. The album became critically acclaimed and later resulted in Burke's first Grammy Award win. In 2004 Burke appeared on the Italian singer Zucchero Fornaciari's Zu & Co., a duets album. He also performed at the Royal Albert Hall for the beginning of the Zu & Co. Tour, from which Zu & Co live at the Royal Albert Hall was recorded.

Burke later signed with Shout! Factory to release the album Make Do With What You Got, which became another critically acclaimed success. In 2006, Burke returned to his country roots with the album, Nashville. In 2008, he received another Grammy nomination for the album, Like a Fire. That year, Rolling Stone ranked Burke as No. 89 on its list of the "100 Greatest Singers of All Time". In 2010, Burke came out with the Willie Mitchell-produced Nothing's Impossible for E1 Entertainment. Later in 2010, he released his final album, Hold on Tight, a collaboration album with De Dijk, a Dutch band.

== Entrepreneurship ==
From an early age Burke was "always an enterprising personality". In addition to his recording career, Burke ran funeral homes, owned two drugstores and a popcorn business in Philadelphia, and later had the first Mountain Dew franchise in Philadelphia.

Burke's entrepreneurial activities included cooking and selling barbecued chicken sandwiches backstage, as well as sandwiches, soft drinks, and fried chickens at increasingly inflated prices to other performers who were refused service at restaurants on the Chitlin' Circuit in the "Jim Crow" South. According to Sam Moore of the soul duo Sam & Dave, "He gave me one pork chop, one scoop of macaroni and cheese, and one spoonful of gravy. I said, 'Is that it?' And he'd say, "That's it, brother. I'm doing you a favor, so take it or leave it." Trombonist Fred Wesley was one who was critical of Burke's business practices. Burke demanded and operated the concessions at the Apollo Theater when he performed there in 1966. This was very profitable for him but so enraged the owner Frank Schiffman that he was banned from performing at the Apollo for life. After playing at the reopening of The Cavern Club in Liverpool in July 1966, Burke said: "The Cavern was a great place to play. The groove was there, the people were there, and it was wonderful. I remember them selling hot Pepsis. What a mistake—you gotta put ice in those things. Think of how many more they could have sold with ice in them."

Burke owned funeral parlors in California, Pennsylvania, and North Carolina, and two of his children have turned the mortuary business into a franchise. Additionally, Burke owned and operated a limousine service. Burke continued to operate companies that supplied theaters and stadiums with his own brand of fast food—Soul Dogs and Soul Corn until at least 2004.

== Bishopric and community work ==
From the early 1970s, after having moved to Los Angeles, Burke concentrated on his episcopal duties, preaching from a crimson throne on the third Sunday of the month at the Prayer Assembly Church of God in Christ, his church at 226 North Market St., Inglewood, California. Within three decades his church grew to have about 170 missions and 40,000 members. By 2000, Burke's Solomon's Temple: The House of God for All People had over 300 ordained ministers whose job is to "feed the hungry, educate the uneducated and be God's workers in the vineyard", and 40,000 parishioners in close to 200 churches across the USA, Canada, and Jamaica. At the time of his death, there were about 180 churches that were established under the charter of his denomination, with Burke indicating: "We're non-sectarian, non-denominational. Ours is an open door." In 2008 Burke acknowledged his Christian methodology differed from that of his maternal uncle, Pastor Harry R. Moore (1933–1982), the founder and pastor of Our First Temple of Faith, at Front and Susquehanna Streets, Philadelphia: "Mine was more: God, money and women, hey hey hey; truth, love, peace and get it on." While pursuing other interests, Burke was also deeply involved in community work, assisting The Crippled Children's Foundation for blind and underprivileged children, while personally being responsible for more than 120 adopted children.

Burke was also a mentor to up-coming Soul and Blues musicians, including a young Reggie Sears.

== Personal life ==
Burke was married four times. In total he fathered 21 children (fourteen daughters and seven sons). He had seven step-children, 90 grandchildren and 19 great-grandchildren at the time of his death.

Burke was married to Doris P. Williams for two months; the marriage was annulled by August 1958, though it resulted in the birth of one child, Valerie Doris Gresham (born 1957).

Burke's second wife was Delores Clark Burke, with whom he had seven children, including Eleanor Alma (born 1958), Dr. Melanie Burke-McCall (born March 1960), Solomon Vincent Jr. (born 1961), Carolyn J. Burke (born 1962), Prince Solomon (JFK) Burke, Gemini C. Burke (born 1964), and Lillian (born 1966).

Burke's third wife was Bernadine Burke. In 2012 Court documents BP Case 126258 (Solomon McDonald Burke) it proved that Burke had never divorced Arch Bishop Bernadine Turner Burke in 1970 before marrying Frances Szeto, Court records shows no divorce from Bernadine McDonald Burke or Delores Burke. Burke's fourth wife was Frances Szeto Burke McDonald (born 1951), Marriage License dated December 1977; she was living with Burke and live in lover/manager and caregiver Jane Margolis Vickers when Burke died, Frances had three children with Burke.

In a 2006 interview Burke admitted having his first child at age 14: "being a father at age 14 maybe been a little early, but I don't regret one moment, one second, one day, or one hour. My only regrets are the loss of my twins and my first son." Burke's twin sons were James and David, who both died in infancy. By 1961, Burke had "three kids on the outside, and about four at home", including Eleanor A. H. Burke (born 1958) Melanie Burke (born 1960), Solomon Vincent Burke Jr. (born 1961). In an open letter to his children, Burke wrote:

Your love and your strength, and the love of your mothers, have made me the strongest-minded father in the world. I may not be the best father. Maybe I haven't done everything that I should do, could do, or would do…or desire to do, but by the grace of God, and your prayers, we will make it. Every day is a new way. None of us are perfect and God knows, I have made many mistakes.

Burke admitted serial infidelity during his marriages: "I was young. Girls were coming from every angle. I couldn't love them all. But I tried." Burke stated:

I realized in later years that money didn't solve problems. I realized too that maybe the reason I had problems with my marriages was because I didn't spend enough time with my children, my family. I thought that sending money home and buying pretty cars and redoing houses, and ordering food by the hundreds of dollars a day, would keep my family together, keep my children happy… Not being there all the time, being on the road 250 days out of the year, was too much. I was gaining the world and losing my children. And my wife. My love life.

=== Family members ===
Several of Burke's family have had successful careers in various facets of show business. In the mid-1960s two of Burke's younger brothers, Alex (born 1948 in Philadelphia). and Laddie (born 1949 in Philadelphia), joined with fellow Germantown High School students, brothers Earl and Timmy Smith to form The Showstoppers, who had a couple of local hit singles in Philadelphia on Showtime Records in 1968, including a No. 11 hit on the UK Singles Chart with "Ain't Nothin' But a Houseparty" b/w "How Easy Your Heart Forgets Me" (Heritage HE-800), which peaked at No. 87 on the Billboard chart in 1968, which was later a discothèque hit (No. 33) in 1971, just before the group disbanded after a series of flops.

Burke's daughter Melanie Burke-McCall, a neo soul singer is an artist as well as a freelance background recording artist with companies including Daxwood Records, Casablanca, A&M and Rawkus Records. She is a studio artist for groups Billy Preston, Peacock (Anna Gayle group), and Leslie Uggams, and toured with Chaka Khan, and wrote and produced Trouble Don't Last Play and LP with Family, & Friends, a 14-song original soundtrack, which was released in 2003, she opened for Jocelyn Brown, Jaheim, Norman Connors, and Angela Bofill, as well as for her father at the Kimmel Center for the Performing Arts in Philadelphia in 2006. In 1972 Burke-McCall was signed along with her siblings The Sons & Daughters of Solomon to MGM Records. Her son is Novel, who released his first studio album The Audiobiography in October 2008, and wrote movie soundtracks for Tyler Perry's Diary of a Mad Black Woman, Step Up, and 21. Her youngest son, Solomon, also has started recording.

Burke's granddaughter Candy Burke (born 1977) was a backing singer at many of Burke's performances, including the July 2008 Juan-les-Pins concert, where she performed a rendition of "I Will Survive". She also appears in the 2003 North Sea Jazz Festival DVD with her grandfather who raised her as his daughter.

Burke's grandson Novel Stevenson has written songs for numerous artists.

Rapper Raeneal T. Quann (known as Q-Don) (born about 1978), who was accidentally shot and killed by robbers on April 26, 2000, outside the Club Evolution in Philadelphia, was also a grandson of Burke.

== Declining health ==
For many years Burke struggled with his health, with his "weight estimated somewhere between 300 and 400 pounds" in 2006. New York Times writer Ben Sisario wrote of Burke: "Wide-shaped in his youth, he grew into Henry VIII-like corpulence, and in his later years had to be wheeled to his throne." In the later years of his life, "arthritis and weight ... limited his mobility" and made him reliant on a wheelchair.

In an interview in 2008, Burke said that "God put me in this wheelchair", and that God's message to him was: "'You are too fat!'" Burke denied having an eating disorder: ... I guess God let me develop into what I am now and allowed me to live. It's not an eating disorder. If I had an eating disorder, I wouldn't travel." In 2006 Burke acknowledged: "It's very rough. I love to eat and I love to cook—as you can see. But my hip has to be replaced and a knee has to be replaced and I've got to lose 150 pounds before they can do that. And that's a lot. But it's NOT! God knows I've enjoyed every kind of food there is, all around the world. It's not like I'm going to miss any of it. Because I've had it all!" Despite his efforts, at the time of his death, Burke's weight still exceeded 350 pounds.

== Death and funeral ==
On October 10, 2010, Burke died at Amsterdam Airport Schiphol (Haarlemmermeer) while on a plane from Washington Dulles International Airport that had just landed. He had been due to perform with De Dijk in Amsterdam on October 12. The cause of death was not immediately clear; according to his family, Burke died of natural causes. At a 2012 probate court hearing of Burke's will, Burke's manager/companion of 16 years, Jane Margolis Vickers, stated that doctors at Reston Hospital suspected that Burke had a pulmonary embolism and had urged him not to travel. Burke decided to leave the hospital "against medical advice" and proceed to Dulles for his flight to Amsterdam. There was no autopsy after his death, but the general assumption is that Burke died as a result of a pulmonary embolism.

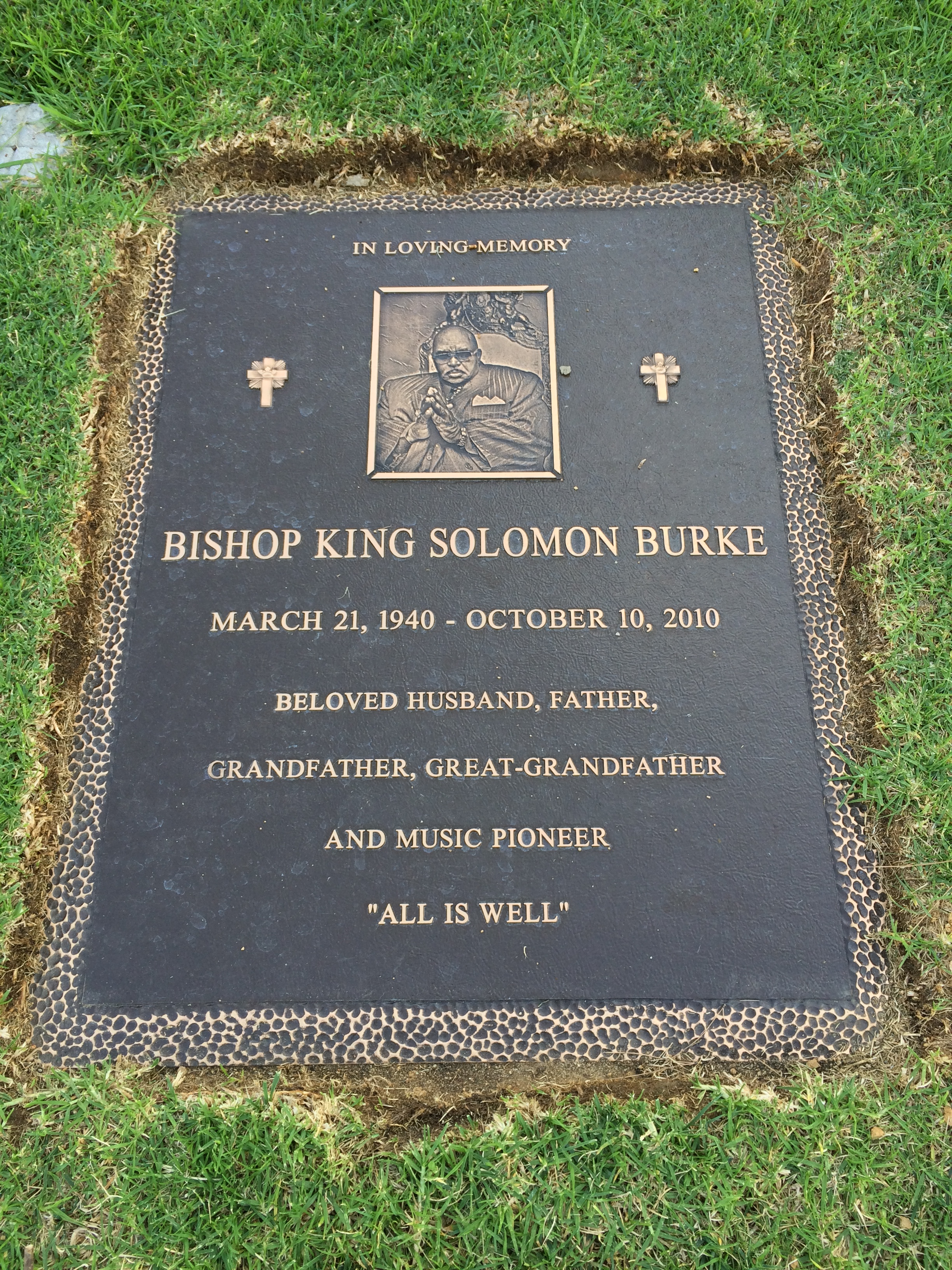
Grave of Solomon Burke at Forest Lawn Hollywood Hills

On October 21 a wake and meditation service was held at the Pierce Brothers Valley Oaks Griffin Mortuary at Westlake Village. Burke's funeral was at 10:00 am on October 22, 2010, at the City of Refuge in Gardena, California and was open to the public. It was simulcast on the internet and at a memorial service held at the Sharon Baptist Church in Philadelphia, that was led by Minister Lester Fields and Solomon's younger sister, Apostle Laurena Burke Corbin, the pastor of Our First Temple of Faith Mt. Deborah Pentecostal Church on Haverford Avenue in Philadelphia, and attended by Burke's extended East Coast family.

Joe Henry described the funeral, which was "2 and a half hours long, included many eulogies, some spontaneous gospel singing; some shouting, some wailing, a fainting, and a daughter who hopped on the balls of her feet and spoke in tongues as punctuation to her scripted remarks. The highlight for me was Rudy [Copeland]'s bluesy Hammond B-3 instrumental of Tommy Dorsey's "Precious Lord (Lead Me On)". He played it like Ray [Charles] would have, kicking it heavy on the bass foot pedals, and shouting his own encouragement: 'Tell the story, son!' The whole service climaxed with a rousing version of "When the Saints Go Marching In", which included the choir, a 2nd-line-style brass band marching through the isles [sic], and everyone in the pews clapping and singing along."

Burke is buried at Lot 4037, Space 1, in the Murmuring Trees section of the Forest Lawn Memorial Park in the Hollywood Hills, at 6300 Forest Lawn Drive, Los Angeles, California.

Neil Portnow, President/CEO of The Recording Academy, praised Burke soon after his death: "GRAMMY-winning soul singer Solomon Burke was revered as one of music's greatest vocalists and a pioneer of the genre. A deeply spiritual man, his love and passion for his craft kept him touring and performing to sold-out audiences right up to his final days. Few artists have had careers as long, rich and influential as his, and he leaves a larger-than-life legacy as powerful and soulful as he was. The music industry has lost one of its most distinctive voices."
