= Rachelle Ann Go discography =

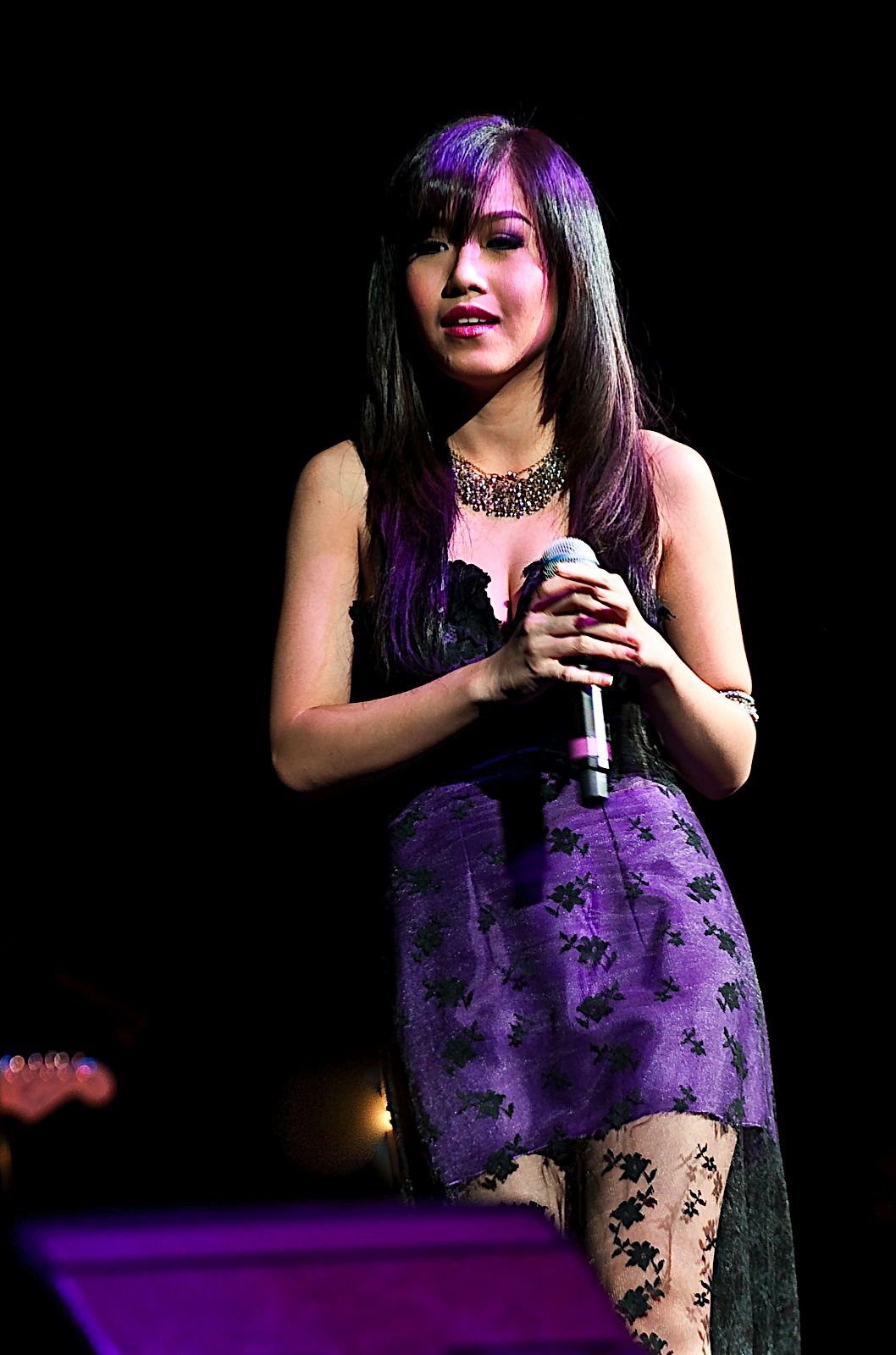
- Go in 2010
- Studio albums: 5
- Live albums: 1
- Singles: 19
- Cast recordings: 1
- Promotional singles: 6
- Soundtrack appearances: 4

Filipino singer Rachelle Ann Go has released five studio albums, one live album, nineteen singles (including three as a featured artist), and six promotional singles. In addition, she has appeared in a cast recording for her theater work. Go won the television talent show Search for a Star and signed with Viva Records in 2004. That year, she released her self-titled debut studio album, which spawned the cover singles "Don't Cry Out Loud" and "Through the Rain". She then released "From The Start", performing the single at the 2004 Shanghai Music Festival, where it received the award for Best Song and earned her the Silver Prize. Rachelle Ann Go was certified double platinum by the Philippine Association of the Record Industry.

I Care (2005), Go's second studio album, was supported by the lead single "If You Walk Away"; she followed this with the title track and the song "Bakit". She released her third studio album Obsession, as well as its first single "Don't Say Goodbye" in 2007. In the same year, she and Christian Bautista featured on the soundtrack of the Filipino dubbed Korean series Princess Hours with "Pag-ibig na Kaya". In April 2008, Go released her live album Rachelle Ann Rocks Live!, a thirteen-piece setlist of rock-influenced covers, with two performances released as singles—Harem Scarem's "Honestly" and Aerosmith's "Cryin'"—and a visual accompaniment on DVD. The following year, she released the cover album Falling in Love (2009), containing music curated from the 1970s and 1980s. It featured the lead single "This Time I'll Be Sweeter", a remake of Angela Bofill's 1978 song.

In 2010, Go released songs which served as soundtracks for the drama film In Your Eyes and the romance series Endless Love. That year, she collaborated with rock band Shamrock on their single "Pagkakataon". She then released her studio album, Unbreakable, in 2011, which included the self-written track "Whispered Fear". In 2014, she debuted in the West End revival of Miss Saigon, partaking in the musical's ensemble cast recording. The Lin-Manuel Miranda-penned promotional single "First Burn", from the 2018 song series titled Hamildrops, featured Go and four actresses who have played Eliza Schuyler in various productions of Hamilton.

== Albums ==
=== Studio albums ===
List of studio albums, with sales figures and certifications
Title	Album details	Sales	Certifications	Ref(s)
Rachelle Ann Go	Released: July 26, 2004; Label: Viva; Formats: CD, digital download	PHL: 80,000 (Note: Philippine sales figure equivalent of double platinum certification for Rachelle Ann Go)	PARI: 2× Platinum	
I Care	Released: February 2006; Label: Viva; Formats: CD, digital download	PHL: 20,000 (Note: Philippine sales figure equivalent of gold certification for I Care)	PARI: Gold	
Obsession	Released: January 23, 2007; Label: Viva; Formats: CD, digital download	PHL: 15,000 (Note: Philippine sales figure equivalent of gold certification for Obsession)	PARI: Gold	
Falling in Love	Released: January 17, 2009; Label: Viva; Formats: CD, digital download	PHL: 10,000 (Note: Philippine sales figure equivalent of gold certification for Falling in Love)	PARI: Gold	
Unbreakable	Released: 2011; Label: Viva; Formats: CD, digital download, streaming	—N/a	—N/a	

=== Live albums ===
List of live albums, with sales figures and certifications
Title	Album details	Sales	Certifications	Ref(s)
Rachelle Ann Rocks Live!	Released: April 2008; Label: Viva; Formats: CD, digital download	PHL: 12,500 (Note: Philippine sales figure equivalent of gold certification for Rachelle Ann Rocks Live!)	PARI: Gold	

=== Cast recordings ===
List of cast recordings
Title	Album details
Miss Saigon: The Definitive Live Recording	Released: 2014; Label: Polydor; Formats: CD, digital download, streaming

== Singles ==
=== As lead artist ===
List of singles as lead artist, showing year released and originating album
Title	Year	Album	Ref(s)
"Through the Rain"	2004	Rachelle Ann Go	
"Don't Cry Out Loud"	2004	Rachelle Ann Go	
"Love of My Life"	2004	Rachelle Ann Go	
"From The Start"	2004	Rachelle Ann Go	
"You and Me (We Wanted It All)" (with Christian Bautista)	2004	Rachelle Ann Go	
"If You Walk Away"	2006	I Care	
"I Care"	2006	I Care	
"Bakit"	2006	I Care	
"Don't Say Goodbye"	2007	Obsession	
"Alam ng Ating Mga Puso"	2007	Obsession	
"Honestly"	2008	Rachelle Ann Rocks Live!	
"Cryin'"	2008	Rachelle Ann Rocks Live!	
"This Time I'll Be Sweeter"	2009	Falling in Love	
"Let the Pain Remain"	2009	Falling in Love	
"Masasabi Mo Ba"	2011	Unbreakable	
"Whispered Fear"	2011	Unbreakable	

=== As featured artist ===
List of singles as featured artist, showing year released and originating album
Title	Year	Album	Ref(s)
"Yo Gloria" (Salbakuta featuring Rachelle Ann Go)	2004	Non-album single	
"Narito" (Jed Madela featuring Rachelle Ann Go)	2007	Only Human	
"Pagkakataon" (Shamrock featuring Rachelle Ann Go)	2010	Everything Gone Green	

=== Promotional singles ===
List of promotional singles, showing year released and originating album
Title	Year	Album	Ref(s)
"Pag-ibig na Kaya" (with Christian Bautista)	2007	Non-album promotional single	
"Paano"	2008	GV 25	
"In Your Eyes"	2010	Non-album promotional single	
"Ikaw Lang"	2010	Non-album promotional single	
"Wagas"	2013	Non-album promotional single	
"First Burn" (with Arianna Afsar, Julia Harriman, Shoba Narayan, and Lexi Lawson)	2018	Hamildrops	

== Soundtrack appearances ==
List of media in which Rachelle Ann Go's songs have been used
Year	Film/series	Song(s)	Ref(s)
2007	Princess Hours	"Pag-ibig na Kaya" (with Christian Bautista)	
2010	In Your Eyes	"In Your Eyes"	
2010	Endless Love	"Ikaw Lang"	
2013	Wagas	"Wagas"	

== See also ==
- List of songs recorded by Rachelle Ann Go
