= List of songs recorded by Rachelle Ann Go =

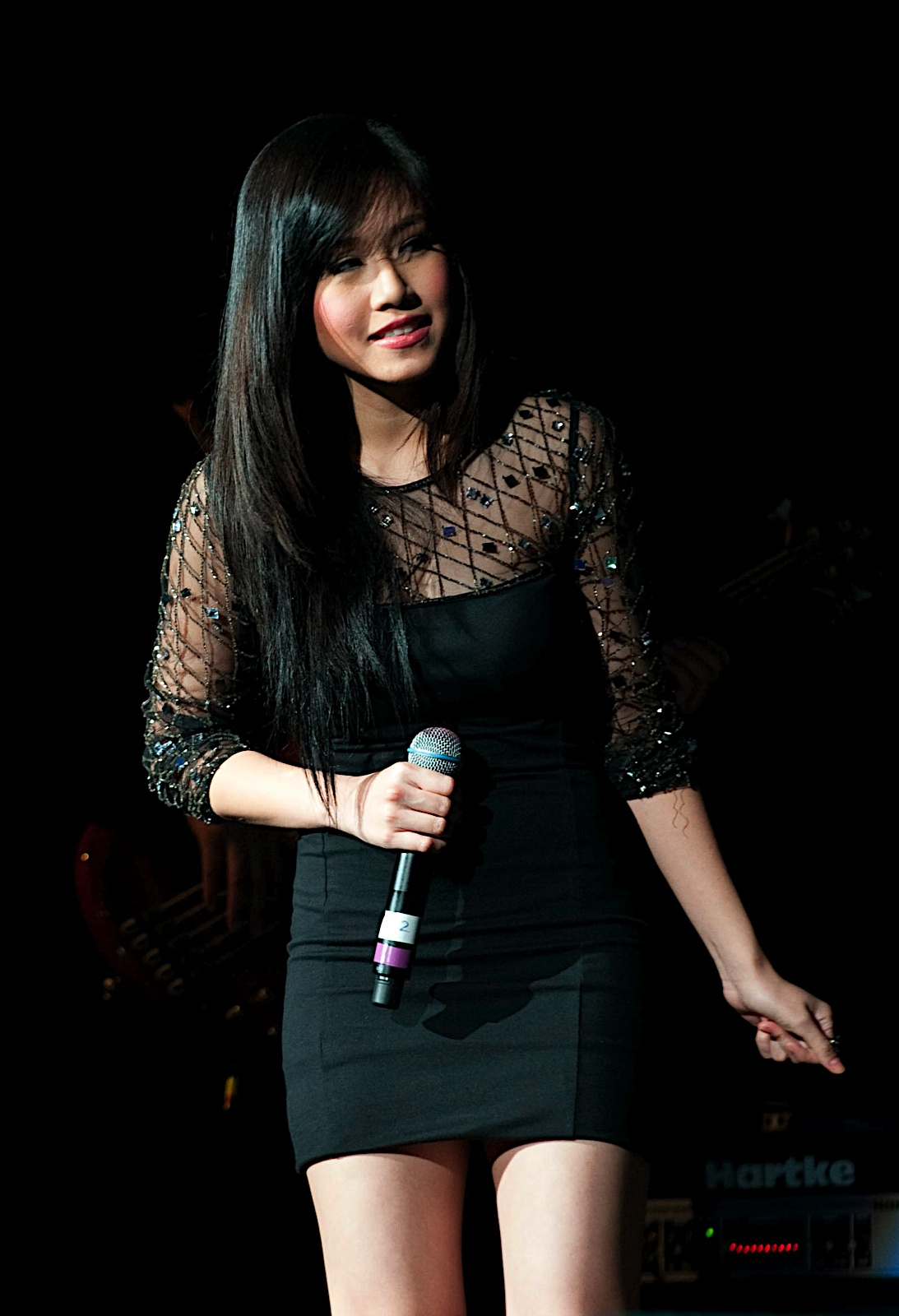
Go performing in 2010

Filipino singer Rachelle Ann Go has recorded material for five studio albums and one live album. She has also collaborated with other artists on duets and featured songs on their albums. After winning the television talent show Search for a Star in 2004, Go signed a record deal with Viva Records and began to work with the producer Eugene Villaluz for her self-titled debut studio album. She recorded her coronation single, a cover of Mariah Carey's "Through the Rain", and a version of Peter Allen's "Don't Cry Out Loud". Different songwriters and producers, including Vehnee Saturno, Jay Durias, Tito Cayamanda, and Jimmy Antiporda, significantly contributed to the album, writing and producing six songs among them. Saturno co-wrote the single "From the Start", which she performed at the 2004 Shanghai Music Festival, winning Best Song and the Silver Prize. On her second studio album I Care (2006), Go collaborated with international producer and songwriter Christian De Walden, experimenting with genres that infuse Filipino music and eclectic styles of dance.

Go continued to work with De Walden on Obsession (2007), cultivating a more mature and provocative image. Described as a "hodgepodge" of wide-ranging global influences, the album featured a mix of Latin and Euro dance genres. It contained the singles "Don't Say Goodbye" and "Alam ng Ating Mga Puso". In 2008, she released a live album titled Rachelle Ann Rocks Live!, which featured performances of rock-oriented covers from musicians such as Aerosmith, Def Leppard, Jon Bon Jovi, and Reo Speedwagon. Go followed this with the tribute album Falling in Love (2009), containing songs curated from the 1970s and 1980s, including Taylor Dayne's "I'll Always Love You" and Angela Bofill's "This Time I'll Be Sweeter". She began songwriting for her sixth studio album Unbreakable, which was released in 2011. She was the sole writer of the single "Whispered Fear", and received co-writing credits for the track "Whoa-Man".

In addition to her studio work, Go has recorded songs for soundtracks, including "Ikaw Lang" from Endless Love (2010) and "Wagas" from the 2013 titular series. She and Christian Bautista collaborated on "Pag-ibig na Kaya" for the Filipino-dubbed South Korean series Princess Hours (2007), and she has covered George Benson's "In Your Eyes" for the 2010 film of the same name. Her theater work encompassed featured appearances on cast recordings for Miss Saigon's 2014 West End company, and the 2018 Hamilton-related song series titled Hamildrops. In the latter, Go and four other actresses who have played Eliza Schuyler recorded "First Burn", written by the musical's creator Lin-Manuel Miranda.

== Songs ==
Key
†	Indicates single release
#	Indicates promotional single release
‡	Indicates live recording release

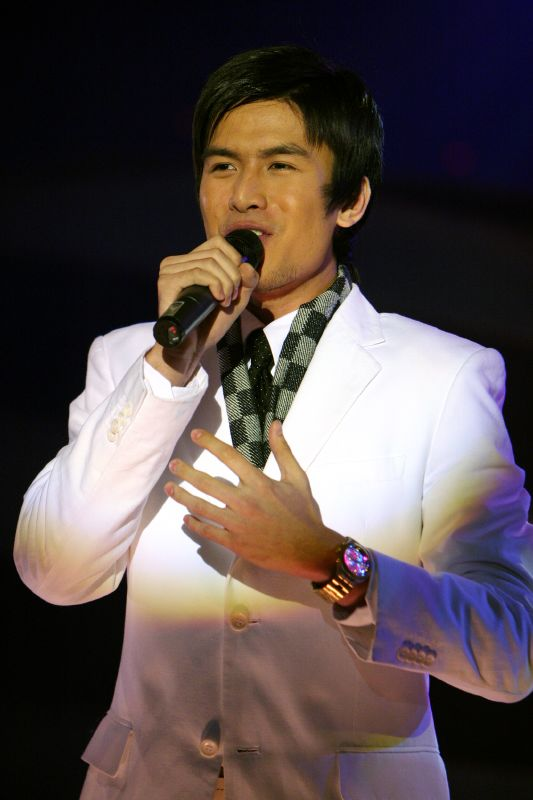
Christian Bautista and Go recorded a cover of Peter Allen and Carole Bayer Sager's "You and Me (We Wanted It All)", and released "Pag-ibig na Kaya" for the soundtrack of Princess Hours.

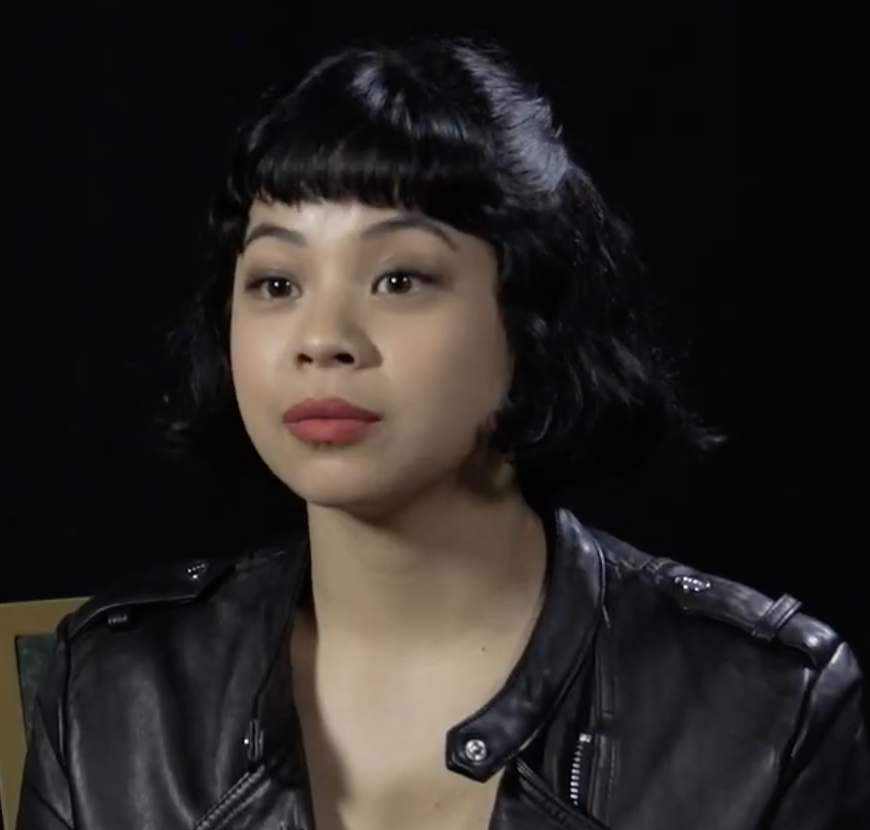
Eva Noblezada and Go featured on "The Movie in My Mind" for the Miss Saigon 2014 West End cast recording.

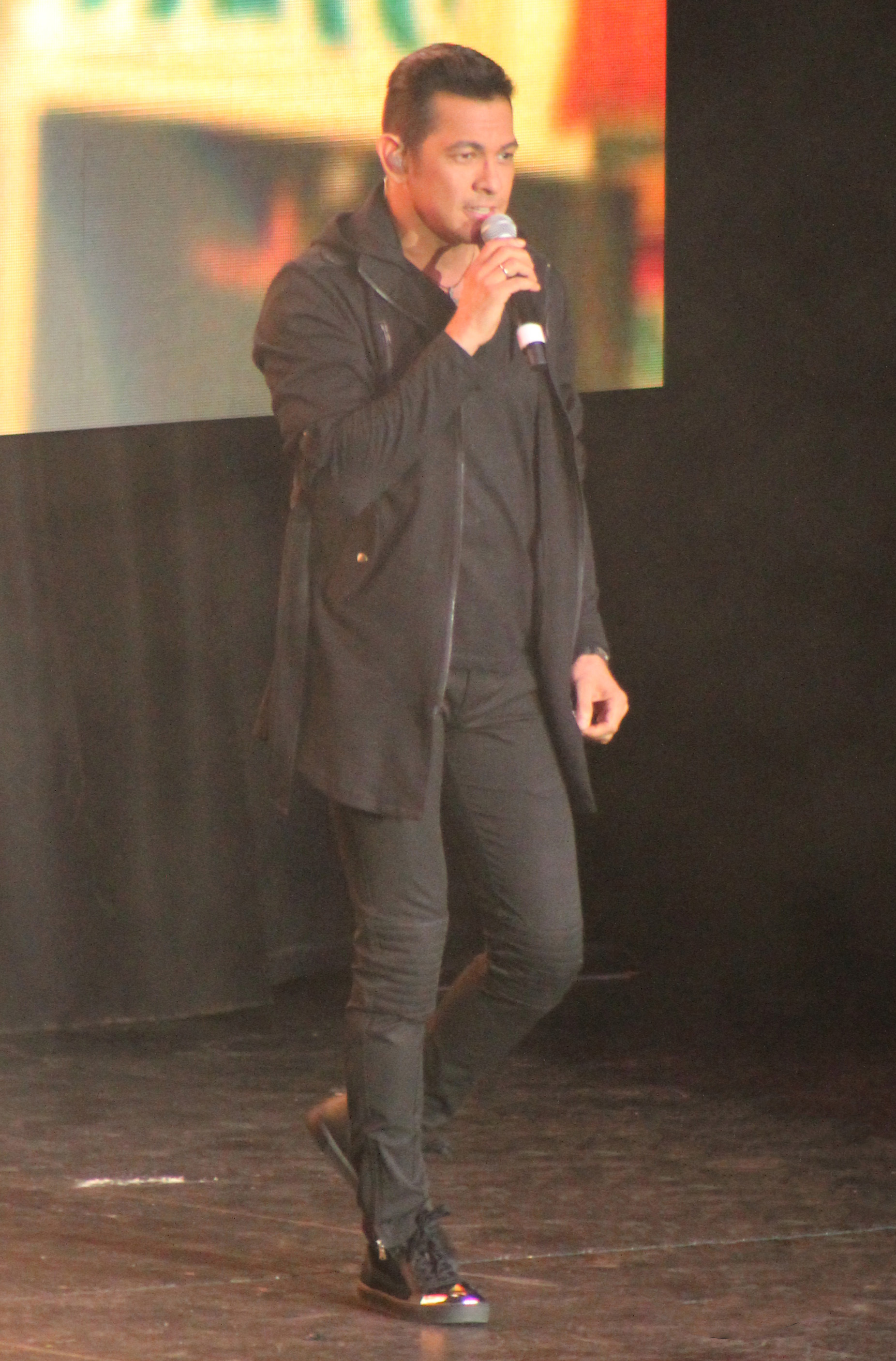
Go featured on Gary Valenciano's compilation album and recorded a cover of "Paano".

Todd Cerney co-wrote "If You Walk Away" on I Care.

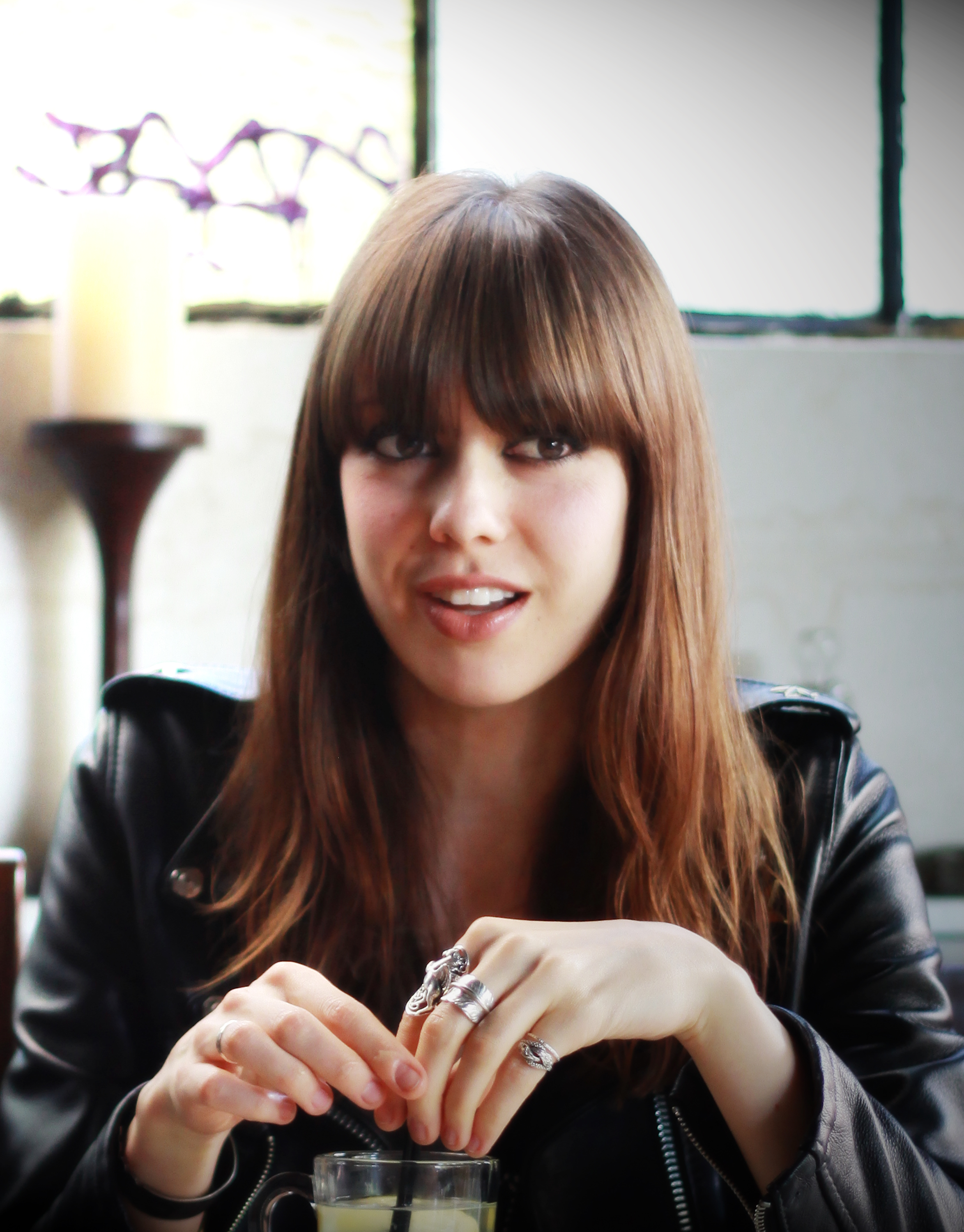
Diane Birch co-wrote "Days to Come" on I Care.

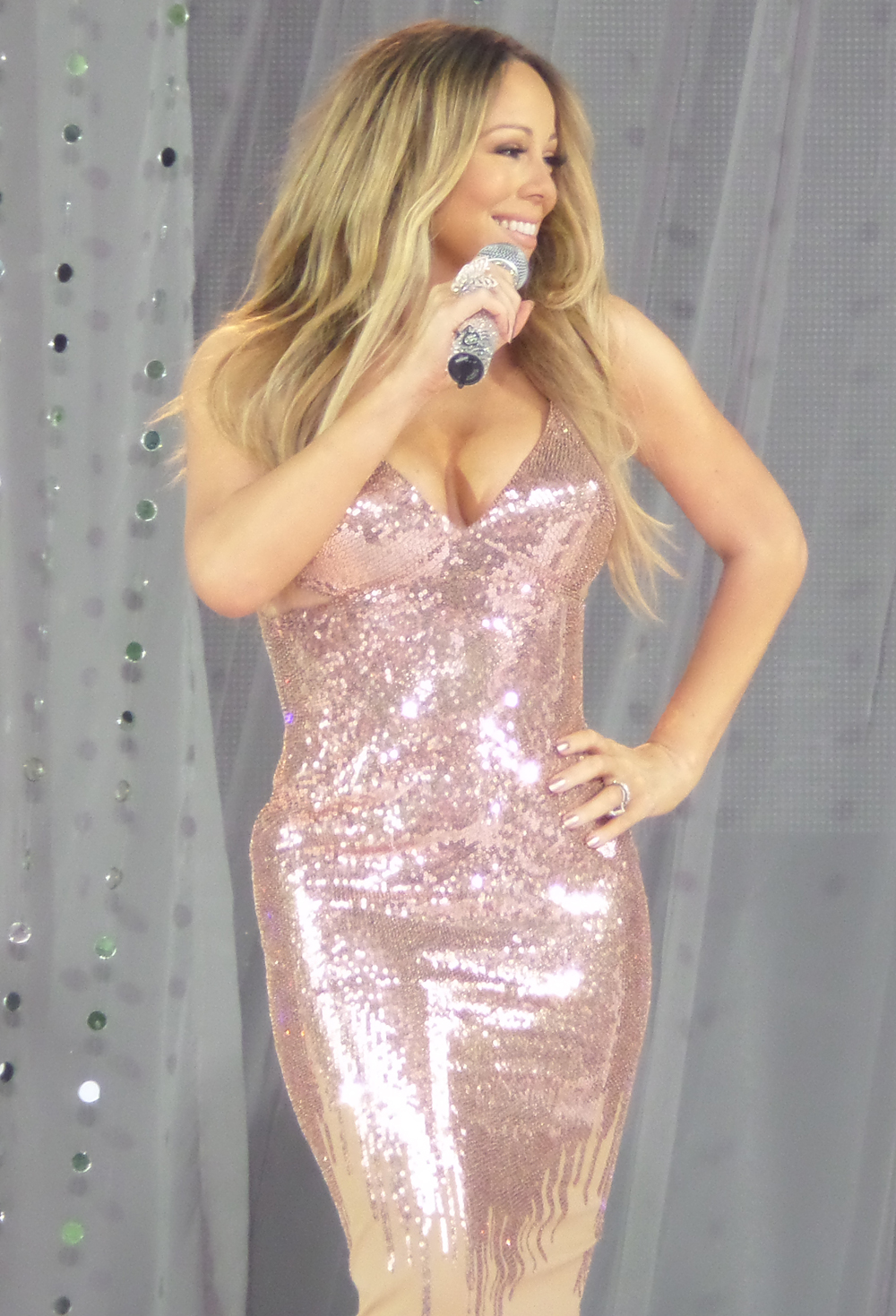
Go has covered Mariah Carey's "Through the Rain".

Name of song, credited artist(s), writer(s), originating album, and year of release
Song	Artist(s)	Writer(s)	Album	Year	Ref.
"Alam ng Ating Mga Puso" †	Rachelle Ann Go	Jimmy Borja	Obsession	2007	
"All the Things You Are"	Rachelle Ann Go	Oscar Hammerstein II; Jerome Kern	Falling in Love	2009	
"And Me U"	Rachelle Ann Go	Alberto Mastrofrancesco; Vito Mastrofrancesco; Carlos Toro Montoro; Mike Shepstone	Obsession	2007	
"And You Love Me"	Rachelle Ann Go	Christian De Walden; Alessandra Flora; Lori Barth; Luigi Patruno; Luigi Rana	Obsession	2007	
"Angel"	Rachelle Ann Go	Florian Lormes; Katharina Aliaga Leiva	I Care	2006	
"Baby It's Time"	Rachelle Ann Go	Lisa Nemzo	I Care	2006	
"Backstage Dreamland" ‡	Miss Saigon Original Cast (with Jon Jon Briones and Rachelle Ann Go)	Alain Boublil; Claude-Michel Schönberg; Richard Maltby Jr.	Miss Saigon: The Definitive Live Recording	2014	
"Bakit" †	Rachelle Ann Go	Chuckie Dreyfus	I Care	2006	
"Can't Cry Hard Enough" ‡	Rachelle Ann Go	David Williams; Marvin Etzioni	Rachelle Ann Rocks Live!	2008	
"Can't Fight This Feeling" ‡	Rachelle Ann Go	Kevin Cronin	Rachelle Ann Rocks Live!	2008	
"Close to You"	Rachelle Ann Go	Christian Martinez	Unbreakable	2011	
"Come One Day"	Rachelle Ann Go	Christian De Walden; Luciano Salvemini; Luigi Paruno; Luigi Rana; Margaret Harris	Obsession	2007	
"Cryin'" ‡	Rachelle Ann Go	Steven Tyler; Joe Perry; Taylor Rhodes	Rachelle Ann Rocks Live!	2008	
"Days to Come"	Rachelle Ann Go	Diane Birch; Byron Brizuela	I Care	2006	
"Didn't Know I Could Love"	Rachelle Ann Go	Eugene Marfil	Unbreakable	2011	
"Didn't We"	Rachelle Ann Go	Jimmy Web	Falling in Love	2009	
"Don't Cry Out Loud" †	Rachelle Ann Go	Peter Allen; Carole Bayer Sager	Rachelle Ann Go	2004	
"Don't Say Goodbye" †	Rachelle Ann Go	Joseph Darwin Hernandez	Obsession	2007	
"Dreaming of You"	Rachelle Ann Go	Franne Golde; Tom Snow	Rachelle Ann Go	2004	
"Feelings"	Rachelle Ann Go	Morris Albert; Louis Gasté	Falling in Love	2009	
"First Burn" #	Rachelle Ann Go (with Arianna Afsar, Julia Harriman, Shoba Narayan, and Lexi Lawson)	Lin-Manuel Miranda	Hamildrops	2018	
"From the Start" †	Rachelle Ann Go	Tito Cayamanda; Vehnee Saturno	Rachelle Ann Go	2004	
"Give It All"	Rachelle Ann Go	Jimmy Antiporda	Rachelle Ann Go	2004	
"Good Love"	Rachelle Ann Go	Bernd Meinunger; Carlos Toro Montoro; Alfons Weindorf	I Care	2006	
"The Heat is On" ‡	Miss Saigon Original Cast (with Jon Jon Briones, Hugh Maynard, Alistair Brammer, Rachelle Ann Go, Eva Noblezada, and Alfonso Casado Trigo)	Alain Boublil; Claude-Michel Schönberg; Richard Maltby Jr.	Miss Saigon: The Definitive Live Recording	2014	
"Here I Am Again"	Rachelle Ann Go	Jimmy Antiporda	Rachelle Ann Go	2004	
"Honestly" ‡	Rachelle Ann Go	Harry Hess	Rachelle Ann Rocks Live!	2008	
"I Care" †	Rachelle Ann Go	Popsis Saturno; Vehnee Saturno	I Care	2006	
"I Got Caught Dancing Again"	Rachelle Ann Go	Waldo Holmes	Falling in Love	2009	
"I Just Can't Let Go" ‡	Rachelle Ann Go	David Pack	Rachelle Ann Rocks Live!	2008	
"I Will Always Love You Anyway"	Rachelle Ann Go	Jimmy Borja; Lori Barth; Ralf Stemmann	Obsession	2007	
"I'll Always Love You"	Rachelle Ann Go	Jimmy George	Falling in Love	2009	
"I'm Sure"	Rachelle Ann Go	Lori Barth; Sergio Ferttita	Obsession	2007	
"If"	Rachelle Ann Go	David Gates	Falling in Love	2009	
"If You Don't Know Me by Now"	Rachelle Ann Go	Gamble and Huff	Falling in Love	2009	
"If You Walk Away" †	Rachelle Ann Go	Skip Adams; Todd Cerney	I Care	2006	
"Ikaw Lang"	Rachelle Ann Go	Rannie Ilag; Cecil Borja	None (Note: Go recorded "Ikaw Lang" as the main theme song of the television series Endless Love in 2010.)	2010	
"In Your Eyes" #	Rachelle Ann Go	Dan Hill; Michael Masser	None (Note: Go recorded "In Your Eyes" as the main theme song of the 2010 film of the same name.)	2010	
"Isang Lahi" †	Rachelle Ann Go	Vehnee Saturno	None (Note: Go recorded "Isang Lahi" as a non-album single in 2005.)	2005	
"It Wasn't Enough"	Rachelle Ann Go	Charles Williams	I Care	2006	
"Iyong-Iyo"	Rachelle Ann Go	Christian De Walden; Luciano Salvemini; Luigi Patruno; Luigi Rana; Margaret Harris	Obsession	2007	
"Kailan Pa"	Rachelle Ann Go	Agatha Obar	Unbreakable	2011	
"Kung Alam Mo Lang"	Rachelle Ann Go	Arthur Madrigal	Rachelle Ann Go	2004	
"Let the Pain Remain" †	Rachelle Ann Go	Willy Cruz	Falling in Love	2009	
"Lihim"	Rachelle Ann Go	Medwin Marfil	Unbreakable	2011	
"Love of My Life" †	Rachelle Ann Go	Jay Durias	Rachelle Ann Go	2004	
"Love Won't Let Us Be"	Rachelle Ann Go	Melvin Morallos	Rachelle Ann Go	2004	
"Masasabi Mo Ba" †	Rachelle Ann Go	Vehnee Saturno	Unbreakable	2011	
"Missing You" ‡	Rachelle Ann Go	John Waite; Mark Leonard; Charles Sandford	Rachelle Ann Rocks Live!	2008	
"The Movie in My Mind" ‡	Rachelle Ann Go and Eva Noblezada	Alain Boublil; Claude-Michel Schönberg; Richard Maltby Jr.	Miss Saigon: The Definitive Live Recording	2014	
"My Forever Love"	Rachelle Ann Go	Tony Ramirez	Obsession	2007	
"Narito"	Jed Madela (featuring Rachelle Ann Go)	Gary Valenciano; Marianne Mazanas	Only Human	2007	
"No Rain" ‡	Rachelle Ann Go	Blind Melon	Rachelle Ann Rocks Live!	2008	
"Number One"	Rachelle Ann Go	Christian De Walden; Michael Mishaw; Carlos Toro Montoro; Steve Singer	I Care	2006	
"Of All the Things"	Rachelle Ann Go	Dennis Lambert; Brian Potter	Falling in Love	2009	
"Paano" #	Rachelle Ann Go	Ray-Ann Fuentes	GV 25: A Gary Valenciano All-Star Tribute Collection	2008	
"Pag-ibig na Kaya" #	Rachelle Ann Go and Christian Bautista	Jonathan Manalo	None (Note: Go and Bautista recorded "Pag-ibig na Kaya" as the main theme song of the Filipino dubbed television series Princess Hours in 2007.)	2007	
"Pagkakataon"	Shamrock (featuring Rachelle Ann Go)	Sam Santos	Everything Gone Green	2010	
"Palad Mo sa Puso Ko"	Rachelle Ann Go	Baby Gil; Willy Cruz	Unbreakable	2011	
"Palm Reader"	Rachelle Ann Go	Alberto Mastrofrancesco; Vito Mastrofrancesco; Steve Singer	I Care	2006	
"Promise Me"	Rachelle Ann Go	Beverly Craven	I Care	2006	
"Pwede Kung Pwede"	Rachelle Ann Go	Tito Cayamanda	Unbreakable	2011	
"Sa Aking Puso"	Rachelle Ann Go	Vehnee Saturno	Unbreakable	2011	
"The Search Is Over" ‡	Rachelle Ann Go	Frankie Sullivan; Jim Peterik	Rachelle Ann Rocks Live!	2008	
"Solitaire"	Rachelle Ann Go	Neil Sedaka; Phil Cody	Rachelle Ann Go	2004	
"Somebody Waiting"	Rachelle Ann Go	Roger Nichols; Paul Williams	Falling in Love	2009	
"Someone" ‡	Rachelle Ann Go	Phil Solem; Danny Wilde	Rachelle Ann Rocks Live!	2008	
"Something in the Air"	Rachelle Ann Go	Linda Nygren; Lori Barth; Steve Singer	Obsession	2007	
"Stay in Love"	Rachelle Ann Go	Tito Cayamanda; Vehnee Saturno	Rachelle Ann Go	2004	
"Strange Are the Ways of Love"	Rachelle Ann Go	Ferdinand Dimadura	I Care	2006	
"The Sweetest Vice"	Rachelle Ann Go	Christian De Walden; Mike Shepstone; Ralph Stemmann	I Care	2006	
"Thank You"	Rachelle Ann Go	Yman Panaligan	I Care	2006	
"That's What Love Is For" ‡	Rachelle Ann Go	Amy Grant; Mark Mueller; Michael Omartian	Rachelle Ann Rocks Live!	2008	
"This Ain't a Love Song" ‡	Rachelle Ann Go	Jon Bon Jovi; Richie Sambora; Desmond Child	Rachelle Ann Rocks Live!	2008	
"This Must Be Love"	Rachelle Ann Go	Emil Noel Miras	Obsession	2007	
"This Time I'll Be Sweeter" †	Rachelle Ann Go	Gamble and Huff	Falling in Love	2009	
"Through the Rain" †	Rachelle Ann Go	Mariah Carey; Lionel Cole	Rachelle Ann Go	2004	
"Traces"	Rachelle Ann Go	Buddy Buie; James Cobb; E. Gordy	Falling in Love	2009	
"Two Steps Behind" ‡	Rachelle Ann Go	Joe Elliott	Rachelle Ann Rocks Live!	2008	
"Unbreakable"	Rachelle Ann Go	Jimmy Borja; Judy Klass	Unbreakable	2011	
"Wagas"	Rachelle Ann Go	Josh Villena	None (Note: Go recorded "Wagas" as the main theme song of 2013 television series of the same name.)	2013	
"Walk into My Life"	Rachelle Ann Go	Alberto Mastrofrancesco; Vito Mastrofrancesco; Adrian Posse; Cynthia Salazar	Obsession	2007	
"We Are One People"	Rachelle Ann Go	Popsie Saturno; Vehnee Saturno	Rachelle Ann Go	2004	
"When You Find Your Voice"	Rachelle Ann Go	Toby Gad; Nina Ossoff	Rachelle Ann Go	2004	
"When You Love Someone" ‡	Rachelle Ann Go	Bryan Adams; Michael Kamen; Gretchen Peters	Rachelle Ann Rocks Live!	2008	
"Whispered Fear" †	Rachelle Ann Go	Rachelle Ann Go	Unbreakable	2011	
"Whoa-Man"	Rachelle Ann Go	Rachelle Ann Go; Jullian Joe Abuda	Unbreakable	2011	
"Window of My Heart"	Rachelle Ann Go and Mark Bautista	Charles Williams	I Care	2006	
"Yo Gloria" †	Salbakuta (featuring Rachelle Ann Go)	Salbakuta	None (Note: "Yo Gloria" was released as a non-album single in 2004.)	2004	
"You and I"	Rachelle Ann Go	Leslie Bricusse	Falling in Love	2009	
"You and Me (We Wanted It All)" †	Rachelle Ann Go and Christian Bautista	Burt Bacharach; Peter Allen; Carole Bayer Sager	Rachelle Ann Go	2004	
"You and Me Against the World"	Rachelle Ann Go	Kenny Ascher; Paul Williams	Falling in Love	2009	
"You Are My Obsession"	Rachelle Ann Go	Christian De Walden; Luigi Rana; Steve Singer	Obsession	2007	
"You Kissed My Tears"	Rachelle Ann Go	Jimmy Borja	Unbreakable	2011	
