= List of roles and awards of Rachelle Ann Go =

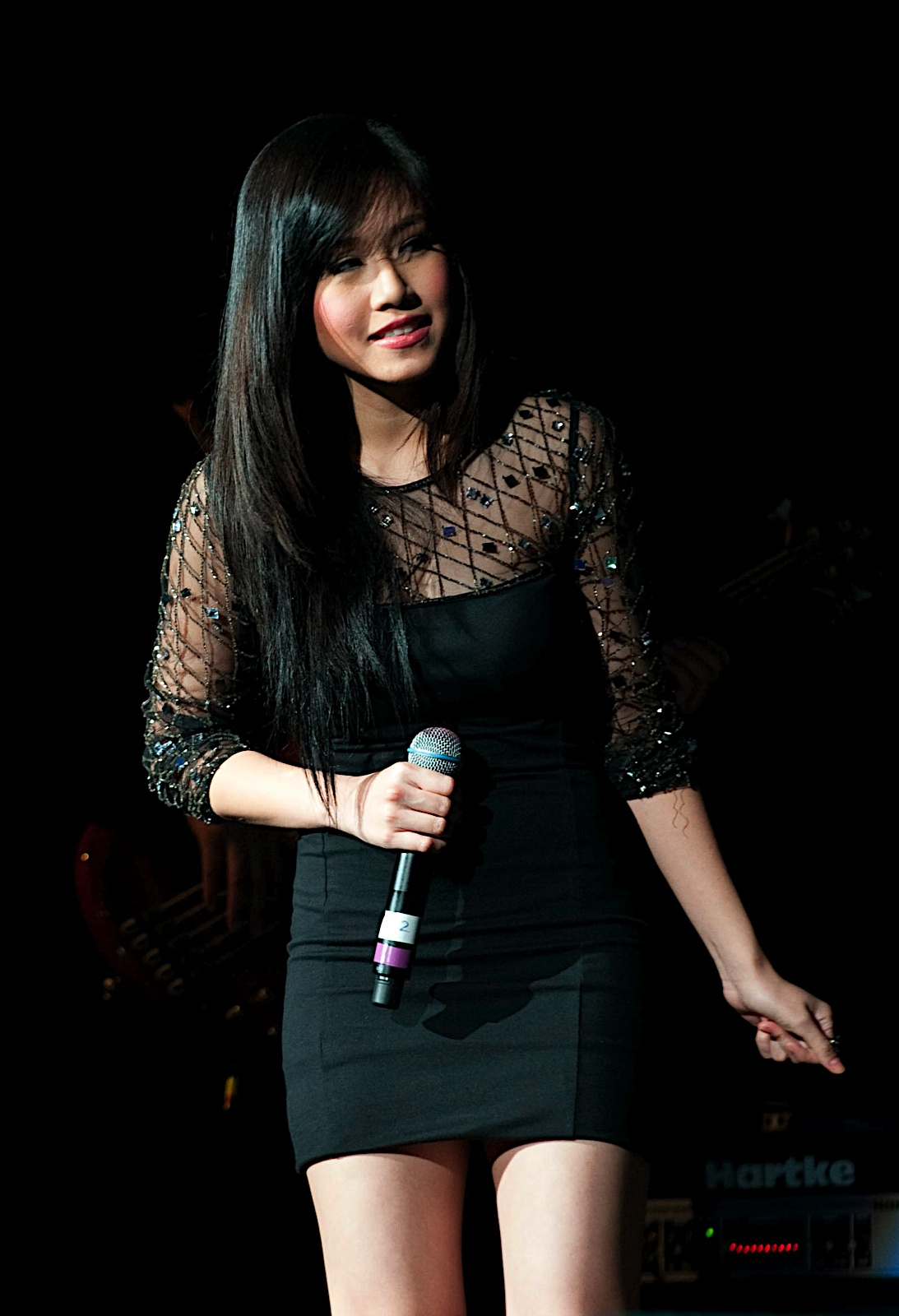
Go performing in 2010

Filipino singer and actress Rachelle Ann Go has received many awards and nominations for her work in music and on stage. Her career began after winning the television talent show Search for a Star in 2004. She signed with Viva Records and worked with producer Eugene Villaluz on her self-titled debut studio album released that same year. Go was named Most Promising Female Recording Artist at the Box Office Entertainment Awards, and earned an Awit Award nomination for Best Performance by a New Female Recording Artist for the cover single "Don't Cry Out Loud". The music video for the single "Love of My Life" received the MTV Pilipinas Music Award for Favorite Female Video. At the 2006 Myx Music Awards, she won Favorite Female Artist and Best Mellow Video for the single "From The Start". She released her second studio album I Care (2006), supported by the single "If You Walk Away", which was nominated for Best Performance by a Female Recording Artist at the Awit Awards.

Obsession (2007), Go's third studio album, yielded the single "Alam Ng Ating Mga Puso", for which she won the Myx Music Award for Favorite Mellow Video. She also recorded a cover of "Paano" for Gary Valenciano's compilation album, earning the Awit Award for Best R&B Recording. She released Falling in Love (2009), which contained remakes of music from the 1970s and 1980s. For the production, she won the Star Award for Revival Album of the Year, and garnered nominations for Female Recording Artist of the Year and Female Pop Artist of the Year at the 2009 ceremony. Another single from the album, "This Time I'll Be Sweeter", earned her a Best Mellow Video nomination at the 2010 Myx Music Awards. The same year, she made a guest appearance in the musical television series Diva, and joined the ensemble of performers in the variety show Party Pilipinas. She then became a mentor in the reality talent show Protégé: The Battle for the Big Break (2011).

In 2011, Go made her theatre debut in the local production of The Little Mermaid, starring as the titular character. She won the BroadwayWorld Philippines Award for Best Actress in a Musical for the role. Three years later, she had her international breakthrough playing a hardened bargirl in the 2014 West End revival of Miss Saigon. For the show, she received the BroadwayWorld UK Award for Best Featured Actress in a New Production of a Musical and the WhatsOnStage Award for Best Supporting Actress. She followed this by playing Fantine, a prostitute dying of tuberculosis, in Les Misérables in 2015, winning Best Female Performance in a Long-Running West End Show at the BroadwayWorld UK Awards. In 2017, she reprised her role in Miss Saigon, which marked her Broadway debut, before being cast in the original West End production of Hamilton, where she portrayed Eliza Schuyler. For her performance in the latter, Go won a BroadwayWorld UK Award for Best Actress in a New Production of a Musical. She has since reprised her roles in various productions and tours of Les Misérables (2019–2022) and Hamilton (2023–2024).

== Filmography ==
=== Television ===
Rachelle Ann Go's television credits with year of release, title(s) and role
Year	Title	Role	Notes	Ref(s)
2004–2010	ASAP	Herself	Host	
2005	Wansapanataym	Shin	Episode: "My Beautiful Chinchinita"	
2005	Search for the Star in a Million	Herself	Host	
2006	Your Song	Joanne	Episode: "If You Walk Away"	
2009	Your Song	Camille	Episode: "Exchange of Hearts"	
2010–2013	Party Pilipinas	Herself	Host	
2010	Diva	Demi	Guest role	
2010	Puso ng Pasko: Artista Challenge	Herself	Contestant	
2011	Nita Negrita	Amanda del Castillo		
2011	Protégé: The Battle for the Big Break	Herself	Mentor	
2012	Biritera	Lara		
2013	Indio	Libulan		
2013–2015	Sunday All Stars	Herself	Host	
2020	All-Out Sundays	Herself	Guest Performer	

=== Film ===
Rachelle Ann Go's film credits
Year	Title	Role	Notes	Ref(s)
2012	Of All the Things	Concert guest	Cameo	
2014	The Heat Is Back On: The Remaking of Miss Saigon	Gigi Van Tranh	Documentary film	
2016	Miss Saigon: 25th Anniversary Performance	Gigi Van Tranh	Concert film	

== Theater ==
Rachelle Ann Go's theatre credits
Year	Title	Role	Venue	Ref(s)
2011	The Little Mermaid	Ariel	Meralco Theater	
2013	Tarzan	Jane Porter	Meralco Theater	
2014–2015	Miss Saigon	Gigi Van Tranh	Prince Edward Theatre	
2015–2016	Les Misérables	Fantine	Sondheim Theatre	
2016	Les Misérables	Fantine	Solaire Theater	
2017	Miss Saigon	Gigi Van Tranh	Broadway Theatre	
2017–2019	Hamilton	Elizabeth Schuyler Hamilton	Victoria Palace Theatre	
2019–2022	Les Misérables	Fantine	Various locations (Note: Go reprised the role of Fantine at the Sondheim Theatre in London's West End in 2019, and joined the Les Misérables UK and Ireland tour in 2022.)	
2023–2024	Hamilton	Elizabeth Schuyler Hamilton	Various locations (Note: Go reprised the role of Eliza Schuyler for Hamilton's international tour, beginning in September 2023 in Manila and in January 2024 in Abu Dhabi.)	
2025	Les Misérables	Fantine	Various locations (Note: Go is set to reprise the role of Fantine in the Arena Spectacular World Tour in Australia in the spring of 2025.)	

== Awards and nominations ==
Awards and nominations received by Rachelle Ann Go
Award	Year (Note: Indicates the year of ceremony. Each year is linked to the article about the awards held that year, wherever possible.)	Recipient(s) and nominee(s)	Category	Result	Ref(s)
Aliw Awards	2005	Night of the Champions	Best Major Concert Collaboration	Won	
Awit Awards	2005	"Don't Cry Out Loud"	Best Performance by a New Female Recording Artist	Nominated	
Awit Awards	2006	"If You Walk Away"	Best Performance by a Female Recording Artist	Nominated	
Awit Awards	2006	Rachelle Ann Go	People's Choice Favorite Female Artist	Won	
Awit Awards	2009	"Paano"	Best R&B Recording	Won	
Awit Awards	2012	"Masasabi Mo Ba"	Best Ballad Recording	Nominated	
Awit Awards	2013	"Kumukutikutitap"	Best Christmas Recording	Nominated	
Box Office Entertainment Awards	2005	Rachelle Ann Go	Most Promising Female Recording Artist	Won	
BroadwayWorld Philippines Awards	2012	The Little Mermaid	Best Actress in a Musical	Won	
BroadwayWorld UK Awards	2014	Miss Saigon	Best Featured Actress in a New Production of a Musical	Won	
BroadwayWorld UK Awards	2015	Les Misérables	Best Female Performance in a Long-Running West End Show	Won	
BroadwayWorld UK Awards	2018	Hamilton	Best Actress in a New Production of a Musical	Won	
MTV Pilipinas Music Awards	2005	"Love of My Life"	Favorite Female Video	Won	
Myx Music Awards	2006	"From The Start"	Favorita Mellow Video	Won	
Myx Music Awards	2006	Rachelle Ann Go	Favorite Female Artist	Won	
Myx Music Awards	2007	Rachelle Ann Go	Favorite Female Artist	Won	
Myx Music Awards	2008	Rachelle Ann Go	Favorite Female Artist	Nominated	
Myx Music Awards	2008	"Pag-ibig Na Kaya" (with Christian Bautista)	Favorita Collaboration	Won	
Myx Music Awards	2008	"Alam Ng Ating Mga Puso"	Favorite Mellow Video	Won	
Myx Music Awards	2009	Rachelle Ann Go	Favorite Female Artist	Nominated	
Myx Music Awards	2010	"This Time I'll Be Sweeter"	Favorite Mellow Video	Nominated	
Myx Music Awards	2011	"In Your Eyes"	Favorite Media Soundtrack	Nominated	
National Commission for Culture and the Arts Ani ng Dangal Awards	2016	Rachelle Ann Go	Dramatic Arts Award for International Recognition	Won	
PMPC Star Awards for Music	2009	Rachelle Ann Go	Female Recording Artist of the Year	Nominated	
PMPC Star Awards for Music	2009	Rachelle Ann Go	Female Pop Artist of the Year	Nominated	
PMPC Star Awards for Music	2009	Falling in Love	Revival Album of the Year	Won	
PMPC Star Awards for Music	2015	"The Way We Were"	Music Video of the Year	Nominated	
West End Frame Awards	2016	"I Dreamed a Dream"	Best Performance of a Song	Won	
WhatsOnStage Awards	2015	Miss Saigon	Best Supporting Actress in a Musical	Won	
