= Rachelle Ann Go =

Filipino singer (born 1986)

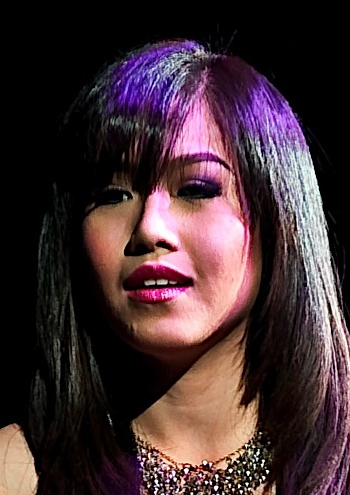
- Go in 2010
- Born: Rachelle Ann Villalobos Go; August 31, 1986 (age 40); Pasig, Metro Manila, Philippines
- Occupations: Singer; songwriter; actress
- Years active: 2003–present
- Works: Discography; roles and awards; songs
- Spouse: Martin Spies (m. 2018)
- Children: 2
- Musical career
- Genres: OPM; pop; musical theater
- Instrument: Vocals
- Label: Viva

Rachelle Ann Villalobos Go (born August 31, 1986) is a Filipino singer and actress. Known primarily for her work in theater, she has starred in musicals on Broadway and in the West End. She began her career as a pop artist in her native country and has received many accolades, including an Aliw Award, an MTV Pilipinas Music Award, two Awit Awards, and five Myx Music Awards. Tatler magazine named her one of the most influential people in Asia in 2021.

Go started performing in singing competitions as a child, and first gained recognition after winning the television talent show Search for a Star (2003). She signed with Viva Records in 2004 and released her self-titled debut studio album, supported by the cover single "Don't Cry Out Loud". Go then competed at the 2004 Shanghai Music Festival and the 2005 Astana Song Festival, winning the Silver Prize and Best Song in each competition. Under the same record label, she released four more studio albums—I Care (2006), Obsession (2007), Falling in Love (2009), and Unbreakable (2011)—and performed rock-influenced covers on the live album Rachelle Ann Rocks Live! (2008). Apart from music, she also took on roles in the television series Diva (2010), Nita Negrita (2011), Biritera (2012), and Indio (2013).

On stage, Go made her theater debut playing the lead role of Ariel in the local production of The Little Mermaid in 2011, followed by the Meralco Theater's 2013 staging of Tarzan, in which she starred as Jane Porter. Go had her international breakthrough as Gigi Van Tranh in the West End revival of Miss Saigon in 2014, reprising the part on Broadway in 2017. She gained further recognition for her portrayal of Eliza Schuyler in the original 2017 West End production of Hamilton. Go has also played Fantine in various stagings and tours of Les Misérables, including the show's 30th anniversary at the Sondheim Theatre.

== Life and career ==
=== 1986–2004: Early life and breakthrough ===
Rachelle Ann Villalobos Go was born on August 31, 1986, in Pasig, Metro Manila. She is the eldest of four children of Oscar Go and Russell Villalobos. Her mother was a member of an all-girl group that performed as a touring band in Japan. Her younger brother, Oz Go, is a fashion designer who has since established an eponymous brand of bridal wear. Go's father raised her to pursue musical interests and encouraged her to perform in front of a crowd. He was passionate about different types of musical instruments and wanted his children to learn how to play one. According to her mother, Go's singing was discovered when she began humming a song at six months old. She learned to sing at age three and would perform Manilyn Reynes's "Sayang na Sayang" all on her own. When Go was nine, she began taking voice lessons. Her interest in music and performing eventually led her to join several amateur singing contests. At eleven, she participated in Eat Bulaga!'s singing competition Birit Baby and finished as a runner-up, singing Celine Dion's "All by Myself".

In 2003, Go began attending San Beda University to pursue a bachelor's degree in business management. Around this time, her parents nudged her to audition for the reality talent show Search for a Star, where she would advance as one of the ten grand finalists. As she prepared to compete for the finale, Go dropped out of San Beda during her freshman year in order to focus on her music career. On March 13, 2004, she won the competition, at the PhilSports Arena, performing a cover of Mariah Carey's "Through the Rain". The Philippine Star critic Matthew Estabillo praised her vocals and stage presence, highlighting Go's win as one that did not rely on the sob stories frequent in reality shows.

After winning Search for a Star, Go was signed to Viva Records and began working on her self-titled debut album. She collaborated with producer Eugene Villaluz and a bevy of songwriters such as Jimmy Antiporda, Jay Durias, and Vehnee Saturno. Rachelle Ann Go was released on July 27, 2004, and contained the cover single "Don't Cry Out Loud". Saturno wrote two of the album's original songs, while Durias produced and provided vocals for a cover of "Love of My Life", a song originally recorded by his band South Border. Reviewers from The Philippine Star lauded Go's vocal range and were impressed with the overall production; Baby Gil complimented her "natural R&B groove", and a writer deemed it a well-crafted album. It received double platinum certification from the Philippine Association of the Record Industry. Two more singles were released from the album: "You and Me (We Wanted It All)" and "From The Start". The first was a duet with Christian Bautista, and the latter was performed by Go at the Shanghai Music Festival, where it won Best Song and earned her the Silver Prize. She was also featured on Salbakuta's single "Yo Gloria". In July 2004, Go was a co-headliner, along with Sarah Geronimo and Erik Santos, for Night of the Champions at the Araneta Coliseum; the production won Best Major Concert Collaboration at the 2005 Aliw Awards. She also won several accolades for Rachelle Ann Go, including the MTV Pilipinas Music Award for Favorite Female Video for "Love of My Life", and the Box Office Entertainment Award for Most Promising Female Singer. At the 2005 Awit Awards, "Don't Cry Out Loud" was nominated for Best Performance by a New Female Recording Artist.

=== 2005–2009: Rise to prominence ===
The Ultimate Champion, Go's first headlining concert, was performed at the Aliw Theater in April 2005, with guest acts such as Ogie Alcasid, Mark Bautista, and Christian Bautista; it garnered her an Aliw Award nomination for Best Major Concert Female. In Kazakhstan, she competed at the 2005 Astana Song Festival, where she also won the Silver Prize and Best Song for her rendition of Regine Velasquez's "Isang Lahi". I Care, Go's second studio album, was released in February 2006. On the album, she worked with Saturno and new international producers, songwriters, and record engineers including Christian De Walden, Todd Cerney, Skip Adams, Carlo Nasi, and Luca Vittori, resulting in a record that merged Original Pilipino Music (OPM) with other musical styles. Gil from The Philippine Star felt that the album illustrated a "unique mixture of Filipino sensibility and cosmopolitan flair", and noted how Go continued to improve and refine her music. For the lead single "If You Walk Away", Go received an Awit Award nomination for Best Performance by a Female Recording Artist, while she won the Myx Music Award for Favorite Female Artist at the 2006 ceremonies.

Go adopted a more mature and provocative style for her subsequent release Obsession. The album was described as a "hodgepodge" of wide-ranging global influences, and Go again employed the help of De Walden, who oversaw the collation of its content, as well as Jimmy Borja, Tony Ramirez, and other songwriters based in Europe and the United States during production. She recorded the songs in different studios in Manila, Los Angeles, and Milan. The track list initially contained songs Go had written, but she decided against including them. Obsession was released on January 23, 2007, supported by the lead single "Don't Say Goodbye". Music critics including Nestor Torre Jr. and Gil heralded the album as a coming-of-age effort. A second single, "Alam Ng Ating Mga Puso", was released in May 2007; and with Christian Bautista, she recorded the duet "Pag-ibig na Kaya", the theme of the Filipino-dubbed South Korean television series Princess Hours. At the 2008 Myx Music Awards, the former single's accompanying music video won Favorite Mellow Video, and the latter song was named Favorite Collaboration.

In April 2008, Go staged a concert at the 19 East Bar in Parañaque, followed by the live album Rachelle Ann Rocks Live!. It featured her performances of rock covers, with two recordings released as singles—Harem Scarem's "Honestly" and Aerosmith's "Cryin'"—and a visual accompaniment on DVD. The Philippine Entertainment Portal journalist Bong Godinez wrote that the album is more "proof of [her] willingness to take risks and at the same time brandish her flexibility as a singer". At the end of September, Go recorded "Paano" for the compilation album GV25, a collection of Gary Valenciano songs performed by various artists, which won Best R&B Recording at the 2009 Awit Awards. Also that year, she released a remake of Angela Bofill's "This Time I'll Be Sweeter", the lead single from her fifth studio album Falling in Love. A tribute album, it included her versions of music from the 1970s and 1980s such as Taylor Dayne's "I'll Always Love You", Harold Melvin & the Blue Notes's "If You Don't Know Me by Now, and Bread's "If". Gil appreciated Go's musical versatility, but criticized the album as calculated and lacking originality.

=== 2010–2013: Career expansion ===
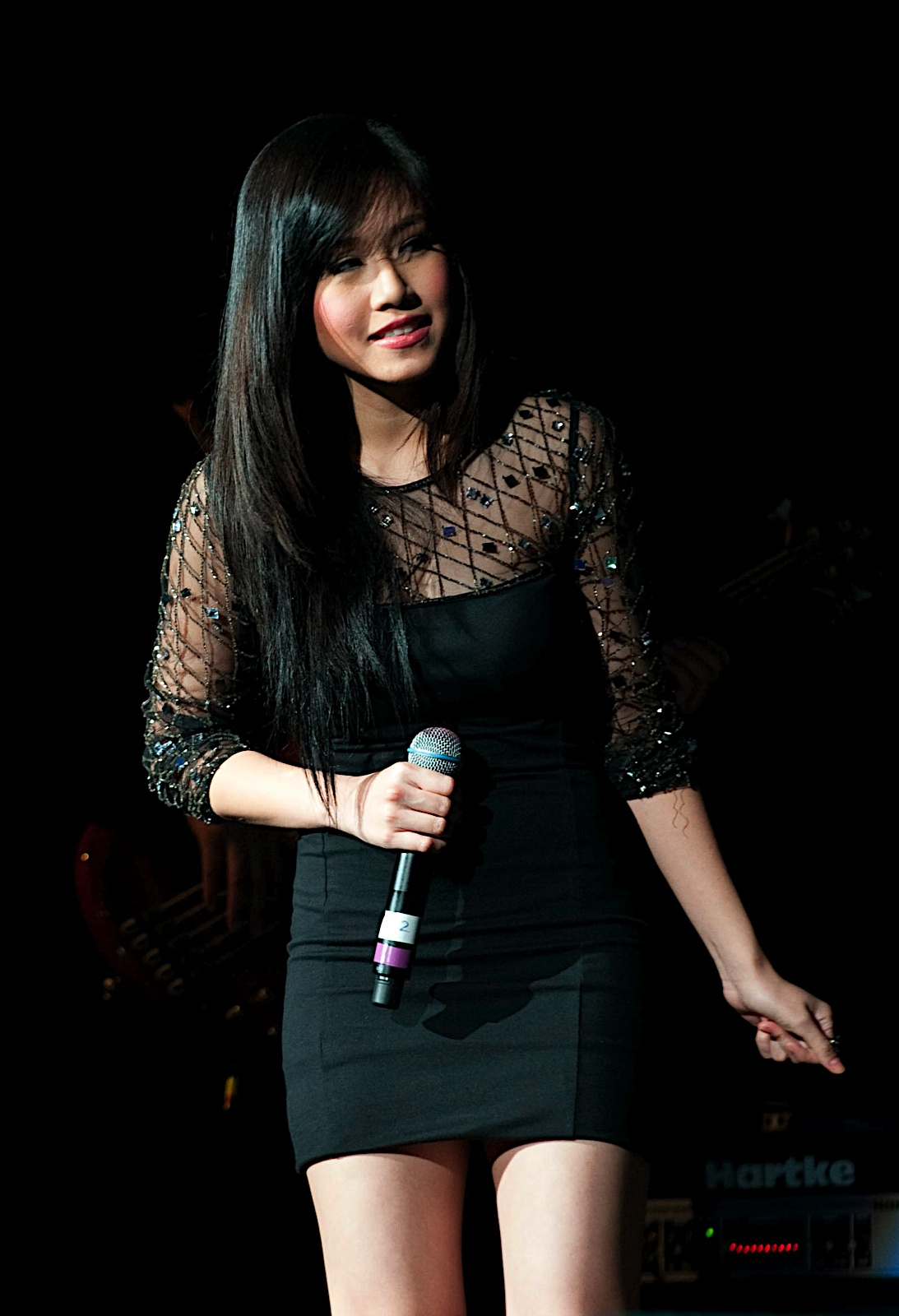
Go performing in Los Angeles during the Love Rocks concert tour in 2010

In 2010, Go appeared as a guest performer in the musical television series Diva, starring Velasquez. She considered the role of a troubled young singer who becomes pregnant and contemplates abortion to be challenging, but found the experience of acting enjoyable. She then recorded a cover of George Benson's "In Your Eyes" for the soundtrack of the 2010 film of the same name. Throughout July and August, Go embarked on a North American tour, titled Love Rocks, with Journey lead vocalist Arnel Pineda. Later that year, she began writing material for her sixth studio album. Released in October 2011, Unbreakable featured the single "Whispered Fear", a song she had developed four years prior and one she regards as a lyrically personal output.

The daytime soap opera Nita Negrita was Go's television project of 2011. It tells the story of a teenager (played by Barbie Forteza) of African American heritage, exploring issues of systemic racism and the demeaning treatment faced by people of color. The show's use of blackface was heavily criticized by media critics. She then became a mentor in the reality singing talent show Protégé: The Battle for the Big Break (2011) alongside Janno Gibbs, Jaya, Jay R, and Aiza Seguerra, among others. Also in 2011, Go made her theater debut in the local production of The Little Mermaid, playing the lead role of Ariel, the titular character based on the 1989 animated film adapted from Hans Christian Andersen's 1837 fairy tale. Go stated that she was drawn to the "strict discipline" of acting on stage, which she perceived as drastically different from performing on screen. The musical ran at the Meralco Theater from November to December 2011. Her performance was generally well received by critics. In a review of the opening night, the Philippine Daily Inquirer writer and singer-actress Lea Salonga deemed Go excellently cast for the part, adding that her singing was a "great mix of that clean and pristine Disney sound".

Go began 2012 by appearing in the Maryo J. de los Reyes-directed musical drama series Biritera, featuring Dennis Trillo and Glaiza de Castro. In partnership with Viva Entertainment, she produced and headlined Rise Against Gravity, a concert staged at the Music Museum on October 26. The historical epic fantasy series Indio (2013), starring Bong Revilla, saw Go portray the moon goddess Libulan. Set during the pre-colonial era of the Philippines, the show featured flight sequences, requiring her to perform stunts while strapped into harnesses; the project was the most expensive series by GMA Network at the time. Go's next stage role was in the 2013 musical Tarzan at the Meralco Theater, based on the 1999 animated film adaptation of Edgar Rice Burroughs's 1912 novel Tarzan of the Apes. She starred as Jane Porter opposite Dan Domenech as the titular protagonist. Kaye Estoista-Koo of the Philippine Entertainment Portal termed Go's portrayal as "super cheery and upbeat", and Rappler's Pia Ranada took note of her emotional delivery, but was critical of her British accent use.

=== 2014–present: International recognition ===
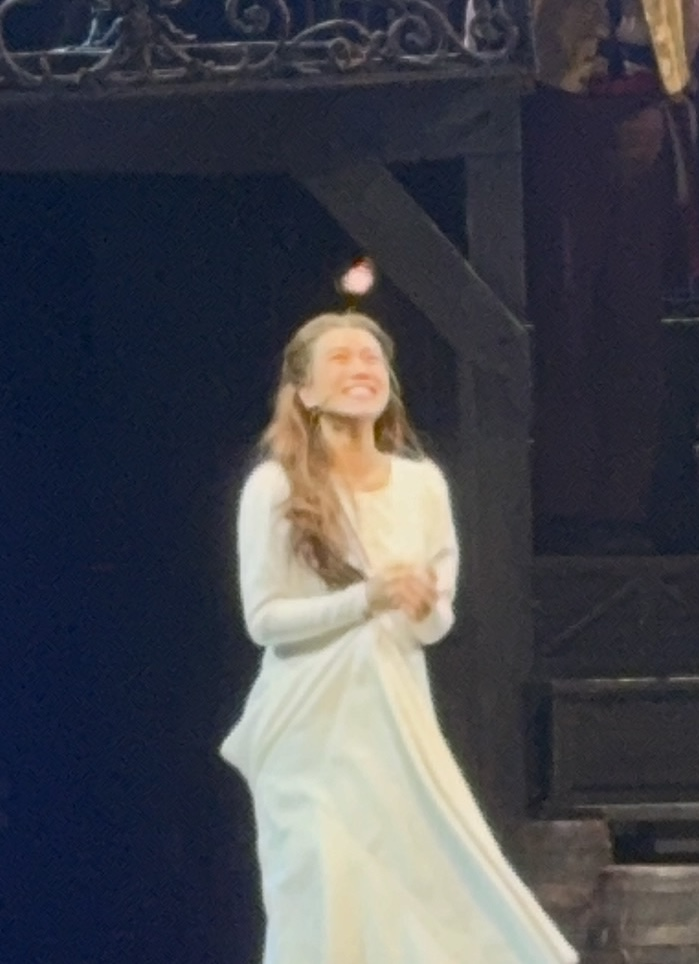
Go as Fantine in Les Misérables: The Arena Spectacular World Tour in Manila in 2026

Go's international breakthrough came in 2014 when she starred as Gigi Van Tranh in the West End revival of Claude-Michel Schönberg's and Alain Boublil's musical Miss Saigon. The producer Cameron Mackintosh conducted casting calls in Manila, as he had done with the original 1989 production, for its principal actors and performers. Go first auditioned for the lead role of Kim, but Mackintosh felt she was not suited for the part due to her being much older. Though initially reluctant about playing a bargirl, she sent an audition tape for the role of Tranh at his encouragement. Impressed with her rendition of "The Movie In My Mind", a song from the musical, Mackintosh cast Go after intensive work sessions in London. She made her debut performance at the Prince Edward Theatre in May 2014 to positive reviews. Nick Clark of The Independent called the show "tremendously slick", praising her character's "moving introspection". She won the BroadwayWorld UK Award for Best Featured Actress and the WhatsOnStage Award for Best Supporting Actress.

After her work with Miss Saigon finished in 2015, Go next played Fantine, a prostitute dying of tuberculosis, in Les Misérables at London's Sondheim Theatre. To prepare, she read the book on which the musical is based, but was challenged by her character's emotional range. As a result, she developed a more subdued technique for her scenes. During her time performing in the show, Go took part in its 30th anniversary gala, where she joined Patti LuPone, who originated the role. For her portrayal, Go won the BroadwayWorld UK Award for Best Female Performance in a Long-Running West End Show, and for "I Dreamed a Dream", she received the West End Frame Award for Best Performance of a Song. Later that year, Go recorded a version of "A Dream Is a Wish Your Heart Makes" for the Asian release of the live-action film Cinderella (2015), which premiered on Disney Channel Asia. In March 2016, she briefly starred in the Manila staging of Les Misérables at the Theatre at Solaire, which ran for three months.

Go reprised the role of Gigi Van Tranh in the 2017 production of Miss Saigon in New York City, which marked her Broadway debut. It received favorable reviews, with Marilyn Stasio of Variety praising Go's convincing performance and how she stood out in the part, and David Rooney of The Hollywood Reporter complimented her as an excellent vocalist. After successfully auditioning for the original West End production of Lin-Manuel Miranda's biographical musical Hamilton, she was cast in the leading role of Elizabeth Schuyler Hamilton, the wife of the title character. It opened on December 21, 2017, at the Victoria Palace Theatre. Critics were generally enthusiastic about the depth of her characterization; Michael Billington of The Guardian found Go to have lent the "poignancy of the neglected" in her role. Writing for Newsweek, Tufayel Ahmed asserted that she "gives a mesmerizing performance ... shows powerful range, from an innocent naivety ... to a woman more pained and tragic". She, alongside the ensemble cast, performed at the 2018 Laurence Olivier Awards, where Hamilton was awarded Best New Musical. She won the BroadwayWorld UK Award for Best Actress in a New Production of a Musical for her work.

Go was a guest performer at the 2019 World Food Prize, which honored individual achievements in the field of food and agriculture. In December, she returned to playing Fantine at West End's Les Misérables before its postponement due to the outbreak of the COVID-19 pandemic; she resumed her role when the production reopened and also had a limited run for the show's concert edition in 2021. Go then joined the musical's touring cast for its United Kingdom and Ireland shows the following year. The rescheduled Expo 2020, hosted by Dubai in March 2022, saw her as one of the musical acts that headlined its live events. From 2023 to 2024, Go reprised her role as Eliza for Hamilton's international tour which visited Manila, Abu Dhabi and Singapore. From 2025 to 2026, she replayed Fantine in the Australian and Manila stops of Les Misérables: The Arena Spectacular World Tour.

== Artistry ==
=== Influences ===
Go's parents introduced her to music at a young age; they stated that one of the first songs she became familiar with was James Ingram's and Linda Ronstadt's duet "Somewhere Out There". Growing up, she listened to the music of Manilyn Reynes. Her musical inspiration varies from R&B singer Alicia Keys to pop vocalists like Mariah Carey, Celine Dion, and Whitney Houston; she cites the last three as influential to her musical identity as a pop artist. She has also named Regine Velasquez as her idol and main influence. In 2004, she joined the talent show Search for a Star, hosted by Velasquez, and said that the latter inspired her to pursue a career in music. Similarly, she has expressed appreciation for Lani Misalucha, whose vocals she admires.

Go holds reverence for Lea Salonga as a source of inspiration for venturing into musical theater. She has declared herself a "self-confessed huge fan", stating that she wishes to emulate the singer. When the two performed together during the 25th anniversary gala of Miss Saigon at London's West End in 2014, Go described it as a childhood dream fulfilled; she credits Salonga as someone instrumental in her decision to undergo auditions for the musical. Salonga reciprocated this affection, asserting that Go is "probably one of the closest ones" to have accomplished similar success on the international stage. Go also considers Patti LuPone as one of her idols in theater, with whom she shared the role of Fantine in Les Misérables. In addition, Go has described Hamilton creator Lin-Manuel Miranda as a lyrical "genius", saying that she is impressed by his creativity as a storyteller.

During the recording of her live album Rachelle Ann Rocks Live!, Go paid homage to the pop-rock influences of musicians such as Bryan Adams, Jon Bon Jovi, Def Leppard, and Survivor. For her cover album Falling in Love, she curated a catalog that incorporate influences of 1970s and 1980s music from artists, including Petula Clark, Dennis Lambert, Helen Reddy, and the Hues Corporation, describing these as a reflection of her life and frame of mind at the time.

=== Voice and musical style ===
"The Movie in My Mind" (2014)
A sample of the song featuring Go's verses in the role of Gigi from the cast recording of Miss Saigon's 2014 revival. She received critical praise for her vocal abilities and introspective performances at West End and Broadway. (Note: Attributed to multiple references:)

Go possesses a lyric soprano vocal range, and is known for her use of the belting technique. (Note: Attributed to multiple references:) She is also able to sing in the whistle register. (Note: Attributed to multiple references:) Early in her career, Go's singing style drew comparisons to Carey, whose songs she frequently performs. She recorded a cover of "Through The Rain" in Search for a Star, and sang "Butterfly" and "Never Too Far" in one of her first headlining shows. Emmie Velarde, a journalist with the Philippine Daily Inquirer, highlights Go's tone and power as one with "formidable sharpness", writing that her range "hits impossibly high notes in as many different ways as she pleases ... alternately with grace, with authority, at times with something approximating vengeance". Other critics have also praised her vocal versatility. (Note: Attributed to multiple references:) According to Godinez from the Philippine Entertainment Portal, Go's performance in Rachelle Ann Rocks Live! emphasized her bold reinvention and adaptability as a singer. Likewise, Gil of The Philippine Star notes that in Falling in Love, Go showcased her ability as an all-around vocalist.

After Go's musical transition to theater in 2011, reviewers appreciated her clear and sweet-sounding vocals, complimenting her sense of pitch in her portrayals of Disney Princesses Ariel and Jane Porter on stage. (Note: Attributed to multiple references:) With her performance in Miss Saigon on Broadway, critics took note of her powerful and expressive singing. In a review of West End's Hamilton, Newsweek critic Tufayel Ahmed commended Go's strong vocals and range, and The Observer writer Susannah Clapp lauded her "full-throttle", empowering belting.

Go's early work encompasses pop, contemporary R&B, hip hop, and OPM genres. (Note: Attributed to multiple references:) A reviewer from The Philippine Star characterized her debut album as an exploration of musical styles, with songs that identify as "bittersweet ballad", "inspiring anthem", and "hip hop dance", among others. Her second album, I Care, infused Filipino music, adult contemporary-tinged balladry, and eclectic styles of dance such as Eurodance. Aiming for artistic growth, Obsession expresses Go's desire to be increasingly provocative; she mixed "Latin and Euro-influenced dance" in between power ballads. Moving away from studio recordings, Go released a live album featuring rock and its subgenres. Godinez regarded her curation of the project as an artistic evolution, remarking that her "strength as an artist" lies in her ability to experiment with different sound elements. She continued merging R&B with other genres such as alternative music on Unbreakable.

== Personal life ==
Go was in a relationship with singer Christian Bautista for two years; the pair broke up in 2007, though they have consistently worked together and have remained friends. From 2008 to 2011, she was romantically involved with high-profile personalities, including dancer Gab Valenciano, former Callalily lead vocalist Kean Cipriano, and actor John Prats.

In February 2017, Go moved to New York City for Miss Saigon's Broadway revival, and met American luxury fitness executive Martin Spies. They became engaged in September, and married the following year in a private ceremony at the Shangri-La resort in Boracay. As of 2020, they resided in Greenwich, London. The couple have two children; a son, born in 2021, and a daughter, born in 2023. After giving birth, Go remarked that she draws inspiration from her onstage enactments of maternal experiences. She also credits theater work in helping build her confidence and maturity as a singer. While raising her first child, Go spoke about how it affected her career choices, saying that it is "equal parts sacrifice and time management". Go became a Born again Christian in October 2005.

In 2015, Go performed at a charity event in London which raised money for the Macmillan Cancer Support and the Make A Difference (MAD) Trust; the latter is an HIV/AIDS awareness and support group within the theater community. She took part in MAD Trust's charity cabaret with the cast of Les Misérables the following year. She then recorded "Tara Tena", with several musicians, and fronted a campaign to increase voter turnout during the 2016 Philippine general election.

== Acting credits and accolades ==
After her breakthrough, Go was a recipient of the Box Office Entertainment Award for Most Promising Female Singer. The single "Love of My" won the MTV Pilipinas Music Award for Favorite Female Video, and she received an Awit Award nomination for Best Performance by a New Female Recording Artist for "Don't Cry Out Loud". She has received a total of five Myx Music Awards, including two consecutive wins for Favorite Female Artist at the 2006 and 2007 ceremonies. For the cover single "Paano", she won the Awit Award for Best R&B Recording at the 2009 ceremony.

Go's stage performances have also earned her accolades. She garnered the BroadwayWorld Philippines Award for Best Actress in a Musical for her theatrical debut in The Little Mermaid. For her portrayal of Gigi Van Tranh in Miss Saigon, she received a BroadwayWorld UK Award and a WhatsOnStage Award. As Fantine of Les Misérables, Go won the BroadwayWorld UK Award for Best Female Performance in a Long-Running West End Show, while in the leading role of Eliza in Hamilton, she received the BroadwayWorld UK Award for Best Actress in a New Production of a Musical.

In 2016, Tatler recognized Go as one of Asia's Leaders of Tomorrow in the publication's annual Gen T list, and was honored with the Ani ng Dangal by the National Commission for Culture and the Arts for her contributions in the field of dramatic arts. In 2021, she was named by Tatler as one of the most influential people in Asia. Go has received a star on the Philippines' Walk of Fame.

== Discography ==
- Rachelle Ann Go (2004)
- I Care (2006)
- Obsession (2007)
- Rachelle Ann Rocks Live! (2008)
- Falling in Love (2009)
- Unbreakable (2011)

== See also ==
- List of Filipino singers
- List of Filipino actresses
- Music of the Philippines
