= Lady Love Me (One More Time) =

Single by George Benson

from the album In Your Eyes
- B-side: "Being with You"
- Released: July 1983
- Studio: Music Grinder (Los Angeles); United Western (Los Angeles); Hit Factory (New York); Record Plant (New York)
- Genre: R&B
- Length: 3:59
- Label: Warner Bros.
- Songwriters: James Newton Howard, David Paich
- Producer: Arif Mardin

George Benson singles chronology
"Inside Love (So Personal)" (1983)	"Lady Love Me (One More Time)" (1983)	"Feel Like Makin' Love" (1983)

"Lady Love Me (One More Time)" is a single recorded and released by George Benson. It was written by David Paich and James Newton Howard, both of whom were associated with rock band Toto, Paich being a member and Howard a frequent collaborator. The song was produced by Arif Mardin. While the single was moderately successful in the United States, charting at No. 30 on the Billboard Hot 100, No. 21 on the Soul singles chart and No. 4 on the Adult Contemporary chart, it was markedly more successful in the United Kingdom. The single entered the UK Singles Chart on 21 May 1983. It reached a peak position of number 11, and remained in the chart for 10 weeks.

== UK single ==
In the UK, the single received extensive radio play in May 1983 lifting the single to the edge of the top 10. The album sold well off the back of the single's success. In Benson's homeland, the single received the bulk of its airplay on adult contemporary radio stations and would later become a staple of the smooth jazz radio format.

"Lady Love Me (One More Time)" was backed with the jazz track "In Search of a Dream" (also lifted from the album In Your Eyes). There was only one version of "Lady Love Me (One More Time)" timed at 3:59 for the single, which was identical to the album time. There were two versions of "In Search of a Dream" available however, the 4:58 edit was used for both single formats. The UK album version on vinyl for "In Search of a Dream" was identical to the single release but the UK chrome dioxide cassette version of the album contained the full version of "In Search of a Dream" timed at 7:37.

On the UK single cover, a competition was announced whereby fans could win two tickets to see George Benson live in concert at Birmingham's NEC on 1 and 2 July or Brighton Centre on 3 July (where there was a choice of either the 6pm or 9pm shows). With the UK single being released in May, there was a very tight deadline of 15 June set for entries.

The single was significant in that fans of jazz were not disappointed whilst the pop-buying public enjoyed a new sounding George Benson. Traditionalists and club DJs in the UK were known to play both sides of the single. The cassette tape recording of "In Search of a Dream" was also bootlegged for jazz club DJ use.

== Recording of the song ==
"Lady Love Me (One More Time)" was recorded at Music Grinder Studio, Los Angeles; with additional recording at United Western in Hollywood, the Hit Factory and Record Plant in New York. The main recordings for the subsequent album In Your Eyes were undertaken at Atlantic Studios, New York.

== Charts ==
Chart (1983)	Peak position
Australia (Kent Music Report)	59
Canada RPM Adult Contemporary	6
Ireland (IRMA)	7
UK (OCC)	11
US Billboard Hot 100	30
US Billboard Adult Contemporary	4
US Billboard R&B	21
US Cash Box Top 100	37

== Personnel ==
- George Benson - vocals, backing vocals, solo and rhythm guitar
- David Paich - keyboards
- Jeff Porcaro - drums
- Nathan East - bass
- Songwriters: David Paich, James Newton Howard
- Rhythm arrangements were by Kashif; vocal arrangements by Kashif and Paul Lawrence Jones III.
- Producer: Arif Mardin
- Engineer: Gary Skardinia, assisted by Randy Burns and Robert Feist
- Background and vocal harmonies were provided by Babi Floyd, Zack Sanders and Hamish Stuart in an afternoon session at Record Plant in New York with Arif Mardin at the helm.
