= Masculados =

Filipino musical group

- Also known as: Masculados Dos
- Origin: Quezon City, Philippines
- Genre: Novelty
- Years active: 2003–present
- Label: Universal Records
- Members: Richard Yumul; Robin Robel; Nico Cordova; David Karell; Enrico Mofar; Orlando Sol
- Past members: Kiro Amirati; Zoltan Amore; Ailex de Asi; Bok Inciong; Lexter Lazaro; Omar Principe; Dart Kamboozia; Ozu Ong; Fernando Zomera

The Masculados are a Filipino all-male novelty music and dance group.

== Career ==
=== 2000s: Formation ===
The Masculados released their eponymous debut album Masculados in 2003 under Universal Records. Masculados was conceived by director Maryo J. delos Reyes and producer Bella Tan of Universal Records. They trained for months with two vocal coaches and choreographer Geleen Eugenio prior to their debut. The all-male group's name was given by Tan, which came from the Filipino word for "muscular".

The inaugural members are Omar Principe, Kiro Amirati, Lexter Lazaro, Robin Robel, Zoltan Amore, Ailex de Asis, Bok Inciong. They were later joined by Chard Sevilla and Enrico Mofar by the following year for their release of their second album, Nakaka in 2004. Tan died in April 2005 due to cancer.

The group experienced a decline by the end of the decade, with members going their own way, either going solo or shifting careers altogether.

=== 2010s: Masculados Dos ===
The Production 56 and Universal Records reestablished the Masculados. Director delos Reyes recruited the new members for the iteration of the group dubbed as "Masculados Dos". Mofar, Lazaro, and Robel remains while Dart Kamboozia, Ozu Ong, Nico Cordova at Orlando Sol are the new members. The carrier single of the Masculados Dos' debut album is "Ganda, Ganda! Sexy, Sexy!".

The Masculados held their 10th anniversary concert, "Masculados: Dekada" at Zirkoh in Quezon City in October 2012. By around this time Kamboozia is no longer part of the group.By 2015, David Karell and Fernando Zomera have joined the Masculados. Ozu died on August 2, 2015 during a carjacking incident. Manager delos Reyes died on January 27, 2018 due to a heart attack.

=== 2020s ===
In 2022, the Masculados' song "Jumbo Hotdog" became viral on TikTok. The group remains extant with Enrico Mofar having been designated as the leader of the group.

In January 2023, the Masculados became part of the Marikit Artists Management. Marikit Artists Management Robin Robel and Mofar remains the holdovers of the original Masculados of 2003–04. Sol, Karell, Cordova, and Richard Yumul, are the more recent recruits.

In late 2025, the Masculados made their comeback re-signing under their first label, Universal Records.

== Image ==
The Masculados are characterized as an "all-male sexy group". It has been tagged the Philippine version of the Chippendales and the spear counterparts of the Sexbomb Girls. They are best known for the song "Jumbo Hotdog" which was made by songwriter Lito Camo.

== Members ==
=== Current members ===
- Enrico Mofar (2003)
- Robin Robel (2003)
- Nico Cordova (2010)
- Orlando Sol (2010)
- David Karell (2015)
- Richard Yumul (c. 2020s)

=== Former members ===
- Kiro Amirati (2003–200?)
- Zoltan Amore (2003–200?)
- Ailex de Asis (2003–200?)
- Bok Inciong (2003–200?)
- Lexter Lazaro (2003–200?)
- Omar Principe (2003–200?)
- Dart Kamboozia (2010–c. 2012)
- Ozu Ong (2010–2015)
- Fernando Zomera (2015–?)

== Discography ==
=== Studio albums ===
- 2003: Masculados
- 2004: Nakaka
