= In Your Eyes (George Benson album) =

Studio album by George Benson
- Released: 1983
- Studios: Atlantic Studios, The Hit Factory and The Record Plant (New York City, New York); Music Grinder Studios and United Western Recorders (Hollywood, California)
- Genres: Soul; funk; jazz; pop
- Label: Warner Bros.
- Producers: Arif Mardin, Kashif (co-producer on track 2)

George Benson chronology
The George Benson Collection (1981)	In Your Eyes (1983)	Pacific Fire (1983)

Singles from In Your Eyes
- 1. "Inside Love (So Personal)" Released: 1983; 2. "Lady Love Me (One More Time)" Released: 1983; 3. "Feel Like Makin' Love" Released: 1983; 4. "In Your Eyes" Released: 1983; 5. "Late at Night" Released: 1983

Professional ratings
Review scores
Source	Rating
AllMusic	2/5 stars
The Encyclopedia of Popular Music	3/5 stars
The Rolling Stone Album Guide	2/5 stars

In Your Eyes is a 1983 album by George Benson. It is his only album produced by producer Arif Mardin. It includes the hit "Lady Love Me (One More Time)".

== Track listing ==
Side one
No.	Title	Writer(s)	Length
1.	"Feel Like Making Love"	Eugene McDaniels	4:22
2.	"Inside Love (So Personal)"	Kashif	5:13
3.	"Lady Love Me (One More Time)"	David Paich, James Newton Howard	3:59
4.	"Love Will Come Again" (with Chaka Khan)	Arif Mardin, Hamish Stuart	5:42

Side two
No.	Title	Writer(s)	Length
5.	"In Your Eyes"	Dan Hill, Michael Masser	3:16
6.	"Never Too Far to Fall"	Hamish Stuart, Ned Doheny	4:00
7.	"Being With You"	Omar Hakim	3:52
8.	"Use Me"	James Ingram, Barry Mann, Cynthia Weil	4:22
9.	"Late at Night" (with Vicki Randle; credited as Vickie Randle)	Barry Mann, Cynthia Weil	3:29
10.	"In Search of a Dream"	Adam Falcon	4:58

Note: Some cassette versions of the album have "Love Will Come Again" and "In Search of a Dream" extended to 6 minutes and 32 seconds and 7 minutes and 37 seconds, respectively. These versions were not included on vinyl or CD issues of the album.

== Personnel ==
Musicians

- George Benson – lead vocals, guitar solo (1, 2, 4, 6–8), rhythm guitar (2), backing vocals (4, 6)
- Joe Mardin – synthesizer programming (all tracks)
- Robbie Buchanan – electric piano (1, 4, 6, 7), synthesizers (1, 5, 6, 8, 9), Moog bass (1, 6), acoustic piano (5, 9), LinnDrum programming (6)
- Jorge Dalto – acoustic piano (1), electric piano (10)
- Kashif – keyboards (2), Synclavier 2 (2), synthesizers (2), Moog bass (2), drums (2), finger snaps (2), backing vocals (2)
- James Newton Howard – keyboards (3), synthesizers (3)
- David Paich – keyboards (3), synthesizers (3)
- Greg Phillinganes – additional synthesizers (3)
- Steve Porcaro – additional synthesizers (3)
- Peter Cannarozzi – synthesizers (4, 10)
- Richard Tee – electric piano (5)
- David Spinozza – guitar (all tracks)
- Paul Jackson Jr. – rhythm guitar (1, 4, 6–8), guitar (5)
- Ira Siegel – guitar (2)
- Adam "Gus" Falcon – rhythm guitar (10)
- Will Lee – bass guitar (1, 4, 5, 8, 9)
- Nathan East – bass guitar (3)
- Anthony Jackson – bass guitar (7)
- Marcus Miller – bass guitar (10)
- Steve Ferrone – drums (1, 6, 9)
- Leslie Ming – drums (2)
- Jeff Porcaro – drums (3)
- Carlos Vega – drums (4, 7, 8)
- Steve Gadd – drums (5)
- Steve Jordan – drums (10)
- Sammy Figueroa – percussion (1, 4)
- Bashiri Johnson – percussion (2)
- Stephen Benben – finger snaps (2)
- Lenny Castro – percussion (3)
- Lew Del Gatto – baritone saxophone (1, 6, 10)
- Michael Brecker – tenor saxophone (1, 6, 10)
- David Sanborn – alto saxophone (6)
- Tom Malone – trombone (1, 3, 6, 10)
- Alan Raph – trombone (1, 3, 6, 10)
- Randy Brecker – trumpet (1, 3, 6, 10)
- Jon Faddis – trumpet (1, 3, 6, 10)
- Jerry Hey – flugelhorn (3)
- Mark Stevens – backing vocals
- B.J. Nelson – backing vocals (2)
- Brenda White King – backing vocals (2)
- Lillo Thomas – backing vocals (2)
- Babi Floyd – backing vocals (3)
- Hamish Stuart – backing vocals (3, 6)
- Zachary Sanders – backing vocals (3)
- Chaka Khan – backing vocals (4)
- Diva Gray – backing vocals (8)
- Lani Groves – backing vocals (8)
- Robin Clark – backing vocals (8)
- Vicki Randle – lead vocals (9)

Music arrangements

- Randy Brecker – horn arrangements (1, 6)
- Robbie Buchanan – rhythm arrangements (1, 5, 6, 8, 9)
- Kashif – rhythm arrangements (2)
- Paul Lawrence Jones III – vocal arrangements (2)
- Jerry Hey – brass arrangements (3)
- James Newton Howard – arrangements (3), string arrangements (3)
- David Paich – arrangements (3), brass arrangements (3)
- Marty Paich – string arrangements (3)
- Lee Holdridge – string arrangements (5)
- Arif Mardin – BGV arrangements (6), rhythm arrangements (6), string arrangements (7, 9), synthesizer arrangements (8), horn arrangements (10)
- Hamish Stuart – BGV arrangements (6)
- Adam "Gus" Falcon – rhythm arrangements (10)

String section (Tracks 3, 5, 7 & 9)

- Endre Granat and Gene Orloff – concertmasters
- Jonathan Abramowitz, Julien Barber, Alfred Brown, Frederick Buldrini, Ted Hoyle, Harold Kohon, Harry Lookofsky, Guy Lumia, Joe Malin, Richard Maximoff, Gerald Tarack, Emanuel Vardi, Marilyn Wright, Richard Young and Fred Zlotkin – string players

Technical

- Arif Mardin – producer
- Kashif – co-producer (2)
- Jeremy Smith – engineer (1, 2, 4–10), mixing (1, 3–10), post tracking
- Michael O'Reilly – mixing, assistant engineer, post tracking, engineer (2)
- Gary Skardina – engineer (3)
- Dan Nash – post tracking
- John Agallo – additional recording
- Danny Caccavo – additional recording
- Bill Dooley – additional recording
- Jay Messina – additional recording
- Bobby Warner – additional recording
- Stephen Benben – tracking assistant assistant engineer (2)
- Julie Last – tracking assistant
- Randy Burns – assistant engineer (3)
- Robert Feist – assistant engineer (3)
- George Marino – mastering at Sterling Sound (New York, NY)
- Chrissy Allerdings – project coordinator
- Frank DeCaro – project coordinator
- Lu Sneed – project coordinator
- Simon Levy – art direction
- Laura LiPuma – design
- Jean Pagliusso – photography
- Quiet Fire – hair, make-up
- Beverly Silver – stylist
- Ken Fritz and Dennis Turner – management

== Charts ==
=== Weekly charts ===
Chart (1983)	Peak position
Dutch Albums (Album Top 100)	25
Finnish Albums (Suomen virallinen lista)	26
German Albums (Offizielle Top 100)	42
New Zealand Albums (RMNZ)	16
Swedish Albums (Sverigetopplistan)	28
UK Albums (Official Charts)	3
US Billboard 200	27
US Top R&B/Hip-Hop Albums (Billboard)	6

=== Year-end charts ===
Chart (1983)	Position
US Billboard 200	92
US Top R&B/Hip-Hop Albums (Billboard)	42

== Certifications ==
Region	Certification	Certified units/sales
Japan	—	98,690
United Kingdom (BPI)	Platinum	300,000^{^}
United States (RIAA)	Gold	500,000^{^}
^{^} Shipments figures based on certification alone.
