= Orlando Sol =

Filipino artist, model, and dancer

- Occupations: Model, actor
- Years active: 2007–present
- Agent: GMA Artist Center (2011–present)
- Height: 1.79 m (5 ft 10 1/2 in)
- Musical career
- Years active: 2010–present
- Labels: Star Music; Universal Records
- Member of: Masculados

Orlando Sol is an artist, model, and dancer from the Philippines.

Sol joined the all-male music sexy group Masculados in 2010.

He launched his career as a solo artist in 2017 with the album Emosyon under Star Music.

== Filmography ==
=== Television ===
- 2018 - The Stepdaughters as Je-Ray
- 2018 - The One That Got Away as Francis
- 2017 - Impostora as Dela Cruz
- 2016 - Encantadia as Pangil
- 2016 - Karelasyon as Jamal / Jay
- 2013 - 2016 Magpakailanman as Nonoy
- 2011 - Biritera as Egay

=== Movies ===
- 2016 - The Sister as Kiko
- 2016 - Pilapil
- 2015 - Tragic Theater
- 2013 - Bamboo Flowers as Luis
- 2013 - Hindi tao.. Hindi hayop
- 2012 - Id'Nal (Mapusok) as Kenjie Samonte
- 2011 - Bahay Bata
- 2010 - Halik sa Tubing
- 2010 - I'll be There as Farmer worker
- 2010 - Diva as Nick
- 2010 - Nandito ako.. Nagmamahal Sa'Yo as Maya's friend
- 2009 - Rosalinda as Plan
- 2007 - A Love Story as Gio
