= Inside Love (So Personal) =

Single by George Benson

from the album In Your Eyes
- B-side: "In Search of a Dream"
- Released: 1983
- Recorded: 1983
- Genre: R&B
- Length: 4:08 (single version) 5:15 (album version)
- Label: Warner Bros.
- Songwriter: Kashif
- Producers: Kashif, Arif Mardin

George Benson singles chronology
"Never Give Up on a Good Thing" (1981)	"Inside Love (So Personal)" (1983)	"Lady Love Me (One More Time)" (1983)

"Inside Love (So Personal)" is a song written by Kashif, and performed by American R&B singer George Benson.

== Track listing ==
7" Single

1. "Inside Love (So Personal)" - 4:08
2. "In Search of a Dream" - 4:58

12" Single

1. "Inside Love (So Personal)" long instrumental version - 7:03
2. "Inside Love (So Personal)" LP version - 5:13
3. "In Search of a Dream" - 4:58

== Chart performance ==
The song was one of several singles taken from the album In Your Eyes. Released in 1983, in which it entered the UK Singles Chart on 17 December. It reached a peak position of number 57, and remained in the chart for 5 weeks. In the U.S., the single was released in the spring of the year. It reached number 43 on the Billboard Hot 100, and number 40 on Cash Box.

Chart (1983)	Peak position
UK Singles Chart	57
US Billboard Hot 100	43
US Billboard Dance/Disco Top 80	7
US Billboard Adult Contemporary	35
US Billboard Hot Black Singles	3
US Cashbox	40
