= High School Circa '65 =

1979 Philippine youth melodrama film

- Directed by: Maryo J. de los Reyes
- Screenplay by: Jake Tordesillas
- Story by: Tom D. Adrales
- Produced by: Sofronio M. Blando; Bernardo S. Castillo; Francisco C. Salinas
- Starring: Eddie Rodriguez; Charo Santos; Liza Lorena
- Cinematography: Edgardo Vinarao
- Edited by: Joe Batac Jr.
- Music by: Rudy Rivero
- Production company: Agrix Films
- Distributed by: Agrix Films
- Release date: February 9, 1979
- Running time: 150 minutes
- Country: Philippines
- Languages: Filipino; English

High School Circa '65 is a 1979 Philippine coming of age slice of life melodrama film directed by Maryo J. de los Reyes on his feature film directorial debut and the screenplay adapted by Jake Tordesillas is from a story written by Tom D. Adrales. Set in 1965, the film follows the everyday lives of the students and the faculty. Starring Eddie Rodriguez as the school's principal, Charo Santos as the substitute teacher, and Liza Lorena as the principal's wife, the students and teachers are played by various actors, particularly the known ones including Roderick Paulate, Azenith Briones, Ike Lozada, Soxie Topacio, Bibeth Orteza, and Joonee Gamboa.

Produced by Agrix Films, the film was theatrically released on February 9, 1979, and received success from both critics and the box office.

== Synopsis ==
The year was 1965 at a certain high school in Manila, the story follows the everyday lives of the students and teachers as they experience their struggles and witness various random events that occur within the school grounds.

== Cast ==
- Eddie Rodriguez
- Charo Santos
- Liza Lorena
- Azenith Briones
- Arnold Gamboa
- Roderick Paulate
- Maribel Aunor
- Angelito
- Beth Manlongat
- Efren Montes
- Jingle
- Michael Sandico
- Margie Braza
- Ricky Sandico
- Nancy Delos Santos
- Michael Vallar
- Boyet Orca
- Gigi Villa
- Victor Morales
- Gemma Mata
- Adrian Panganiban
- Frederick
- Ike Lozada
- Bibeth Orteza
- Lillian Laing
- Adul de Leon
- Joonee Gamboa
- Angie Ferro
- Lily Miraflor
- Betty Mendez
- Loreta
- Soxie Topacio
- Estrella Antonio
- Benjie Ledesma
- Aida Carmona
- Domingo Landicho
- Maryann Paulate
- Moppette Sandico
- Maribeth Vargas
- Carolyle Enriquez
- Maristela Enriquez
- Cynthia Arce
- Rosemarie Suzara
- Angelica Tandiana
- Aida Cristobal
- Roger Abella
- Glenn Abastillas
- Alex Dacanay
- Alex Domingo
- Jimmy Long
- Bobby Ramiro
- Norman Bustamante
- Aries Santillan
- Froilan Samonte
- Edgar Garcia
- Noel Vergara
- Thadeus Jovellanos
- Fernando Angeles

== Production ==
In 1978, Maryo J. Delos Reyes, who began his work by working with Nora Aunor and setting up acting workshops that launched the careers of Roderick Paulate and Willie Santos, was offered a break by director Lupita Aquino-Kashiwahara, who worked with her in Minsa'y Isang Gamu-gamo as Nora's acting coach, to become a director of a project, High School Circa '65, for Agrix Films.
