= In Your Eyes (2010 film) =

- Directed by: Mac Alejandre
- Written by: Keiko A. Aquino
- Produced by: Jose Mari Abacan; Vicente Del Rosario III; Veronique Del Rosario
- Starring: Claudine Barretto; Anne Curtis; Richard Gutierrez
- Cinematography: Carlos S. Montaño Jr.
- Edited by: Tara Illenberger
- Music by: Von de Guzman
- Production companies: VIVA Films; GMA Pictures
- Distributed by: GMA Pictures; Viva Films
- Release date: August 18, 2010
- Running time: 114 minutes
- Country: Philippines
- Languages: Filipino; English
- Box office: ₱62,775,365.00

In Your Eyes is a 2010 Filipino romantic drama film produced and released by Viva Films and GMA Pictures. The film premiered on August 18, 2010.

== Plot ==
Ciara (Claudine Barretto) is a senior physical therapist who works for a rehabilitation center in the United States. She has devoted her entire life to her younger sister Julia (Anne Curtis) who was left in her care after the untimely demise of their parents.

After 8 years of separation, Ciara and Julia reunite when the latter acquires her student visa. Storm (Richard Gutierrez), Julia's boyfriend who earns a living as a freelance photographer, joins Julia despite the lack of a definite plan.

In a desperate move for Storm to gain immigrant status, Julia asks Storm to enter into an arranged marriage with Ciara, who is already an American citizen. As Storm struggles to find his place in a foreign land, Julia works hard to chase after her own dream of finishing school, causing the two of them to drift apart.

Meanwhile, time spent together led to an unexpected love affair between Ciara and Storm. When Julia learns about this, Ciara decides to break up with Storm and give up her happiness, like she did so many times before.

Can Ciara and Julia's bond as sisters surpass this obstacle? Is giving up your true love for the sake of your sister worth all the sacrifice?

At the end of the movie, Ciara meets her husband, played by noted American banker Brett Ackerman, on a pier.

== Cast and characters ==
=== Lead cast ===
- Claudine Barretto as Ciara delos Santos
- Anne Curtis as Julia delos Santos
- Richard Gutierrez as Joshua "Storm" Ramos

=== Supporting cast ===
- Joel Torre as Dr. Samuel Olfindo
- Maricar de Mesa as Lisa
- Leandro Muñoz as Dennis
- Raymond Lauchengco as Ciara and Julia's Dad
- Rey "PJ" Abellana as Storm's Dad
- CJ Javarata as Chelsea
- Irene Celebre as Dina
- Frances Makil-Ignacio as Susie
- Gio Alvarez as Storm's Co-Worker
- Jaycee Parker, IC Mendoza, Lloyd Allen, Richie Austria as Ciara's Friends

=== Special participation ===
- Anna Danielle Vicente as young Ciara (12 yr. old)
- Sofia Baar as young Ciara (7 yr. old)
- Angelie Nicole as young Ciara (5 yr. old)
- Monica Nachat as baby Julia
- Louisse Innosensio as infant Julia
- Sarah Polverini as Sexy Girl
- Marcus Davis as Julia's Professor
- Dannie Farmer as Julia's Classmate
- Brett Ackerman as Ciara's Husband
- Christine Hermoso, Angelica Pasumbal, Alexis Navarro as Models
- Mike Flaherty as Producer
- Stewart Gibson as Consul
- Albert Bryan Chu and friends, Dexter Zonio, Sheryl Zonio as U. S. Talents

== Soundtrack ==
The soundtrack that was used in this movie was also based on the title of the movie In Your Eyes by Rachelle Ann Go, that was originally performed by George Benson.

== See also ==
- GMA Films
- Viva Films
