= Maryo J. de los Reyes =

Filipino film director (1952–2018)

- Born: October 17, 1952; Santa Ana, Manila, Philippines
- Died: January 27, 2018 (aged 65); Dipolog, Zamboanga del Norte, Philippines
- Occupations: TV and film director

Maryo J. de los Reyes (October 17, 1952 – January 27, 2018) was a Filipino film and television director. He began his career in the 1970s. He is the only director in the exclusive Grand Slam club, he joined in 2004 when he won Best Director in FAMAS Awards, Luna Awards, Gawad Urian, and Star Awards for his film Magnifico.

== Early life and education ==
Maryo J. de los Reyes was born on October 17, 1952 in Santa Ana, Manila. He initially entered a seminary but was convinced by his teachers to pursue a career in the arts instead of committing to a religious vocation.

De los Reyes attended the University of the Philippines Diliman where he graduated with a degree in broadcasting in 1974. He was also a concurrent member of the Philippine Educational Theater Association while studying.

== Career ==
=== Film and television ===
De los Reyes made his directorial debut with the 1979 film High School Circa '65. His next breakthrough film is the 1984 film Bagets which kickstarted the acting careers of Herbert Bautista, William Martinez, and Aga Muhlach.

Another notable film was the 2003 film Magnifico starring Jiro Manio which won the Crystal Bear Award at the 54th Berlin International Film Festival in 2004. His last film was The Unmarried Wife which premiered in 2016.

In television he was involved in various series for ABS-CBN and GMA Network such as Habang Kapiling Ka (2002), Mga Anghel na Walang Langit (2005), and Munting Heredera (2011). His last completed television work was Someone to Watch Over Me (2016).

=== Music ===
Along with producer Bella Tan, de los Reyes formed the all-male sexy music group Masculados in 2003 and was launched under the label of Universal Records.

== Death ==
De los Reyes died after suffering a heart attack on January 27, 2018, while attending a friend's party at the Dakak Park and Beach Resort in Dipolog, Philippines, at the age of 65.

== Personal life ==
De los Reyes resides in Quezon City but maintained a rest house in Pansol, Calamba, Laguna. He also has roots to the province of Bohol. He was also a faculty member of his alma mater, University of the Philippines.

== Filmography ==
=== Film ===
Year	Title	Associated Film Production(s)
1979	High School Circa '65	Agrix Films
1979	Gabun	Agrix Films
1979	Annie Batungbakal	NV Productions
1980	Bongga Ka Day!	Associated Entertainment Corporation
1980	Pag-Ibig Ko, Hatiin Ninyo	Agrix Films
1980	Disco Madhouse	Agrix Films
1980	4 na Maria	Agrix Films
1981	Rock N' Roll	NV Productions
1981	Ibalik ang Suwerti	NV Productions
1981	Pepe en Pilar	Regal Entertainment
1981	Totoo Ba ang Tsimis?	Regal Entertainment
1982	School Girls	Regal Entertainment
1982	Diosa	Regal Entertainment
1983	Ang Boyfriend Kong Kano	Regal Entertainment
1983	Minsan May Isang Ina	Regal Entertainment
1983	Don't Cry For Me, Papa	Regal Entertainment
1983	Saan Darating ang Umaga?	Viva Films
1984	Kaya Kong Abutin ang Langit	VH Films
1984	Hindi Mo Ako Kayang Tapakan	VH Films
1984	Tender Age	Regal Entertainment
1984	Anak ni Waray vs. Anak ni Biday	Regal Entertainment
1985	Mga Kuwento ni Lola Basyang	Regal Entertainment
1985	Bagets	Viva Films
1986	I Love You Mama, I Love You Papa	Regal Entertainment
1986	Bagets 2	Viva Films
1987	Tagos ng Dugo	VH Films
1988	Kapag Napagod ang Puso	VH Films
1990	My Other Woman	Regal Entertainment
1992	Sinungaling Mong Puso	Regal Entertainment
1994	Bala at Lipstick	Regal Entertainment
1998	Pahiram Kahit Sandali	Regal Entertainment
1999	Linlang	Viva Films
1999	Higit Pa Sa Buhay Ko	Regal Entertainment
1999	Sa Paraiso ni Efren	Regal Entertainment
2000	Mahal Kita, Walang Iwanan	Regal Entertainment
2000	Gusto Ko Nang Lumigaya	Viva Films
2001	Ano Bang Meron Ka?	Regal Entertainment
2001	Red Diaries	Regal Entertainment
2002	I Think I'm in Love	Regal Entertainment
2002	Laman	Regal Entertainment
2002	Bedtime Stories	Regal Entertainment
2003	Magnifico	Violett Films
2004	Kulimlim	Viva Films
2004	Naglalayag	Angora Films
2005	Happily Ever After	Regal Entertainment
2007	A Love Story	Star Cinema
2008	Torotot	Viva Films
2009	Kamoteng Kahoy	APT Entertainment
2009	Nandito Ako Nagmamahal Sa'Yo	Regal Entertainment
2010	I'll Be There	Star Cinema
2013	Bamboo Flowers	Productions 56 and Film Development Council of the Philippines
2016	The Unmarried Wife	Star Cinema

=== Television ===
Year	Title	Network
1988	Regal Drama Hour: Infidel	ABS-CBN
1999	Di Ba't Ikaw	GMA Network
2002	Habang Kapiling Ka	GMA Network
2005	Mga Anghel na Walang Langit	ABS-CBN
2006	Calla Lily	ABS-CBN
2007	Impostora	GMA Network
2008	Magdusa Ka	GMA Network
2008	Obra	GMA Network
2008	Saan Darating ang Umaga?	GMA Network
2009	Dapat Ka Bang Mahalin?	GMA Network
2009	Rosalinda	GMA Network
2010	Gumapang Ka sa Lusak	GMA Network
2010	Pilyang Kerubin	GMA Network
2010	Little Star	GMA Network
2011	Munting Heredera	GMA Network
2012	Biritera	GMA Network
2012	Pahiram ng Sandali	GMA Network
2013	Magkano Ba ang Pag-ibig?	GMA Network
2014	Niño	GMA Network
2015	Pari 'Koy	GMA Network
2016	Someone to Watch Over Me	GMA Network
2018	Hindi Ko Kayang Iwan Ka	GMA Network

== Awards ==
- 2004: Won the Crystal Bear for "Best Feature Film" for Magnifico during the Berlin International Film Festival
- 2004: Won Deutsches Kinderhilfswerk Grand Prix for "Best Feature Film" for Magnifico during the Berlin International Film Festival
- 2004: Won the Special Jury Award for "International Competition" category for film Naglalayag at the Brussels International Independent Film Festival
