= Biritera =

2012 Philippine television drama series

- Title card
- Also known as: Diva
- Genre: Drama; Musical
- Created by: Agnes Gagelonia-Uligan
- Written by: Glaiza Ramirez; Gilbeys Sardea; Michiko Yamamoto
- Directed by: Maryo J. de los Reyes
- Creative director: Jun Lana
- Starring: Roseanne Magan
- Theme music composer: Nonong Pedero
- Opening theme: "Ang Lahat ng Ito'y Para sa 'Yo" by Roseanne Magan
- Country of origin: Philippines
- Original language: Tagalog
- No. of episodes: 73

Production
- Executive producers: Juel Balbon; Nieva M. Sabit
- Producer: Wilma Galvante
- Production locations: Manila, Philippines
- Cinematography: Vivencio Gonzales, Jr.
- Camera setup: Multiple-camera setup
- Running time: 30–45 minutes
- Production company: GMA Entertainment TV

Original release
- Network: GMA Network
- Release: February 6 – May 18, 2012

Biritera (international title: Diva) is a 2012 Philippine television drama musical series broadcast by GMA Network. Directed by Maryo J. de los Reyes, it stars Roseanne Magan in the title role. It premiered February 6, 2012 on the network's Telebabad line up. The series concluded on May 18, 2012, with a total of 73 episodes.

== Cast and characters ==
Cast

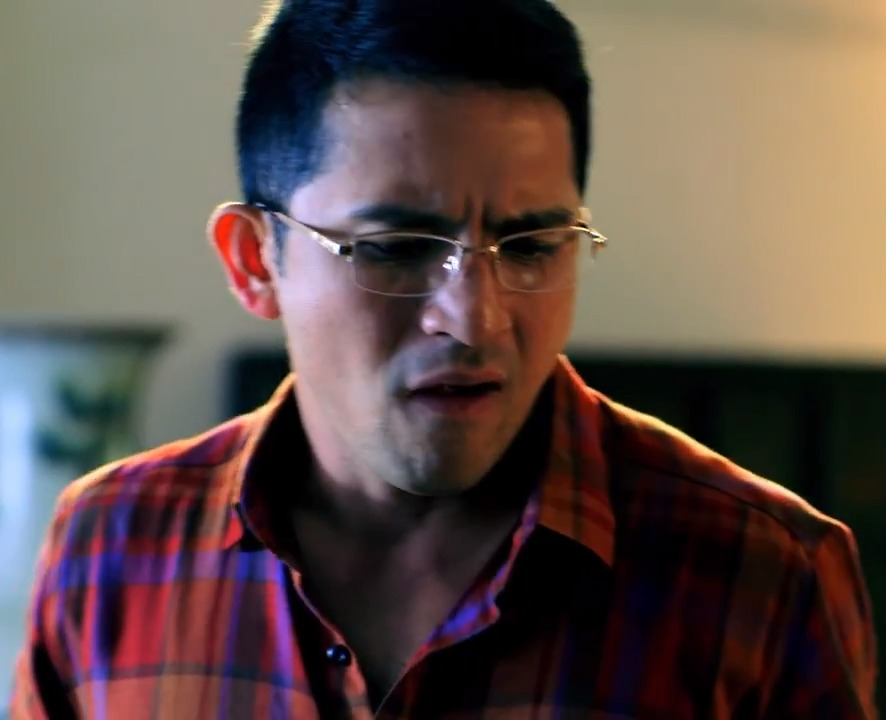
Dennis Trillo

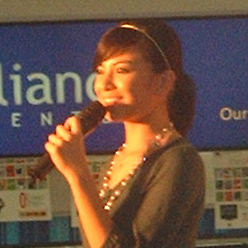
Glaiza de Castro

Lead cast

- Roseanne Magan as Roseanne Abigail Marcelino Fuentebella

Supporting cast

- Dennis Trillo as Andrei Marcelino
- Angelika Dela Cruz as Remedios "Remy" Kapitolyo Fuentebella
- Glaiza de Castro as Mikaela / Mikmik
- Ryan Eigenmann as Dalton Dimaano
- Yul Servo as Jerome Macapagal
- Ces Quesada as Simang Kapitolyo
- Rich Asuncion as Josephin Abesamis
- Gwen Zamora as Iris
- Neil Ryan Sese as Eric Fuentebella
- Barbara Miguel as Darling
- Sweet Ramos as Barbie Tamondong
- Scarlet as Mylene Tamondong

Guest cast

- Jaya as Susie
- Orlando Sol as Egay
- Ken Chan as Popoy
- Kiel Rodriguez as Miko
- Patricia Ysmael as Beverly
- Kim Rodriguez as Gwen
- Hiro Magalona as Teofi
- Jamaika Olivarez as Kleng Kleng
- Nomer Limatog Jr. as Miguelito
- Tanya Gomez as Krising
- Mary Roldan as Cecile
- Myra Carel as Bevs
- Moi Scarlet as Tamondong
- Claudine Barretto as Carmela Abesamis
- Jillian Ward as Louie May Imperial
- Glenda Garcia as Marissa Marcelino
- Rachelle Ann Go as Lara
- Miguel Tanfelix as teenage Andrei
- Romano Vasquez as Lito
- Bubbles Paraiso as herself
- Gerald Pizzaras as Paco Arcega
- Jan Marini as Mariel Arcega
- Ernie Garcia as Mauro Fuentebella
- Evangeline Pascual as Olivia Fuentebella
- Bettina Carlos as Clarissa
- Chinggay Riego as Darling's mother

== Ratings ==
According to AGB Nielsen Philippines' Mega Manila household television ratings, the pilot episode of Biritera earned a 24.8% rating. The final episode scored a 29.9% rating.
