= Shamrock (Filipino band) =

Filipino alternative/pop rock band

- Origin: Manila, Philippines
- Genres: Alternative rock Pop rock
- Years active: 2003–present
- Labels: Independent (2003-2005; 2019-present); Universal Records (2005–2009); Viva Records (2010–2013); Star Music (2015–2016); Bellhaus Entertainment (2017–2019)
- Members: Bradley Holmes; Sam Santos; Nico Capistrano; Harald Huyssen
- Past members: Marc Tupaz (hiatus); Henry Abesamis; Mike Magalong

Shamrock is a Filipino alternative/pop rock band originating from Manila, Philippines. They are known for their single "Alipin".

== Members ==
=== Current members ===
- Bradley Holmes (vocals)
- Sam Santos (bassist)
- Nico Capistrano (guitarist)
- Harald Huyssen (drummer)

=== Former member ===
- Marc Tupaz (vocals; hiatus)
- Henry Abesamis (keyboards)
- Mike Magalong (drummer)

== Discography ==
=== Studio albums ===
Album	Tracks	Year	Records
Are You Serious?	Ms. Serious; Fine; Dalangin (Kanta 'to); Waiting For Summer; Today; Alipin; Naaalala Ka; In My Head; Up There; Radio Girl; Loser; Ms. Serious (acoustic version)	2005	Universal Records
Barkada	Hold On; Paano? Haplos; Kaba; Barkada; Ngiti; Iisang Taon; Awit; I Wanna Be; Should I It's Me; I Think of You; I'd Do Anything; Be With You; Hear Me Cry; Freedom	2007	Universal Records
Shamrock	Sandata; Ipaglaban; Salamat Na Lang; So Do I? Around You; Hailey; Nananalangin; Pagkakataon; Birthday; Sa Piling Mo; Pananaginip; Nananalangin (acoustic); Para Sa Lahat	2010	Viva Records
Legacy	Mangarap Ka; Tag Araw; Magpakailanman; Walang Hanggan; Habang May Buhay; Tag Ulan; Finding It Hard To Breathe; Bai; Musikero; Next In Line	2012	Viva Records
Nakakabaliw (10th Anniversary)		2015	Star Music
One Five		2017	Bellhaus Entertainment

=== Demo ===
- Ikaw Lang (2008)

== Singles ==
- "Alipin" (Jumong theme song)
- "Naaalala Ka" (Sassy Girl Chun-hyang theme song)
- "Sana"
- "Miss Serious"
- "Nandito Lang Ako" (Captain Barbell theme song)
- "Sandata" (Captain Barbell theme song)
- "Hold On" (Jumong theme song)
- "Paano"
- "Ngiti"
- "Haplos"
- "Ikaw Lang"
- "Just a Smile Away"
- "Wag Kang Matakot" (Joaquin Bordado theme song)
- "All I Need"
- "Pagkakataon" (feat. Rachelle Ann Go) (Playful Kiss theme song)
