= I Care (album) =

Studio album by Rachelle Ann Go
- Released: January 10, 2006
- Recorded: 2005
- Genre: Pop
- Length: 43:26
- Language: English, Tagalog
- Label: VIVA
- Producer: Vicente Del Rosario, Christian De Walden, Carlo Nasi, Steve Singer, Ralph Stemmann, Eugene Villaluz, Alwyn Cruz

Rachelle Ann Go chronology
Rachelle Ann Go (2004)	I Care (2006)	Obsession (2007)

Singles from I Care
- 1. "If You Walk Away" Released: January 2006; 2. "I Care" Released: March 2006; 3. "Bakit" Released: May 2006

I Care is the second studio album by Filipino singer Rachelle Ann Go, released in the Philippines on January 10, 2006 by VIVA Records. The album is an immediate follow-up to her successful self-titled debut album. Its singles include "If You Walk Away", the title track, and "Bakit", a promotional single.

The album was released on digital download through iTunes on June 1, 2005. To date, the album has sold over 15,000 units in the country, certifying Gold by the Philippine Association of the Record Industry.

== Background ==
After striking it big with four hit singles from her debut album, Go gears for more successes with her second album. Titled I Care, the album is the result of the tight collaboration of an international line-up of producers, songwriters, arrangers and engineers. Each contribution is meant to showcase the vocal artistry of the 19-year-old Search for a Star champion who has now come to her own as one of the country's finest performers.

Go celebrated Christmas 2004 with a Platinum record award for over 30,000 copies sold by her self-titled album. It has since turned double platinum, and has produced the hits "Don't Cry Out Loud", "You and Me (We Wanted It All), a duet with Christian Bautista, "When You Find Your Voice", "From the Start" and "Here I Am Again".

Among her other notable accomplishments this year were her successful solo concert debut in Rachelle Ann Go, the Ultimate Champion which was held at the Aliw Theater on April 29, 2005, and her win as the People's Choice for Favorite Female Artist at the 2005 MTV Pilipinas Music Awards, for her rendition of "Love of My Life". Written and produced by Jay Durias of South Border, the song was included in her first album.

== Production and development ==
The first single released is "If You Walk Away". Written by Todd Cerney and Skip Adams, the power ballad was produced by Christian De Walden and Carlo Nasi. De Walden, who is one of the top producers in Europe and North and South America, came to the Philippines for the recording sessions at VIVA Entertainment's Amerasian Studios in Quezon City. Along with him came Luca Vittori, one of Italy's leading engineers to record and mix several songs for Go's album.

Aside from the first single, De Walden and Vittori also did the ballad "Baby It's Time" and the dance cuts, "Number One", "Palm Reader", "The Sweetest Vice" and "Good Love". De Walden also produced "Days to Come", but the song was mixed at the Studio di Ripetta in Rome by Vanni G. and David Bacon, two of the hottest DJ's in Italy's trendy club scene.

The title cut, "I Care", was composed and produced by Vehnee Saturno. Saturno gave Go "From the Start", one of the hits from her first album. This was the song that won her the silver prize at the 7th Shanghai Asia Music Festival in 2005, grabbing the Best Composition award in the competition. Last September, Saturno and Go won first prize in the Best Own Country Song category of the Astana Song Festival held in Kazakhstan for her interpretation of Saturno's "Isang Lahi".

Other songs in the album are "Angel", composed by Florian Lormes and Katharina Aliaga Leiva of Germany, and "Thank You", written by singer-composer Yman, both produced by Alwyn Cruz. "It Wasn't Enough" and "Windows of My Heart", a duet with Mark Bautista, were both written and produced by Charles Williams of California. "Bakit", is a composition by actor Chuckie Dreyfus. "Strange Are the Ways of Love" is by Ferdinand Dimadura. A cover of Beverly Craven's "Promise Me" was produced by Eugene Villaluz.

== Critical reception ==
Professional ratings
Review scores
Source	Rating
Titik Pilipino	4/5 stars

I Care did not perform well enough commercially. Although, it received positive response from OPM critics. Resty Odon of Titik Pilipino gave the album four out of five stars, saying "With body proportions hewing close to Beyonce perfection, I am of the opinion that the tectonic shift to sultriness in this album is not ill-advised at all". He liked the dance numbers, calling them as "enlightened move". He praised the first single, saying "'If You Walk Away' pegs Rachelle Ann’s voice between Whitney Houston and Celine Dion". However, he felt that Go's voice did not fit on R&Bs and jazzes like her cover of Julia Fordham's "Promise Me". The review ended with Odon, stating "There’s not a number, though, that borders the category of 'unlikable' in this album [...] so long as she does not overshoot her high-notes limit".

== Track listing ==
#	Title	Writer(s)	Arranger(s)	Length
1	"I Care"	Vehnee Saturno	Arnold Buena	4:01
2	"Bakit"	Chuckie Dreyfus	Ferdie Marquez	4:07
3	"Angel"	Drez, Rachelle Ann Go	Nino Regalado	3:45
4	"Baby It's Time"	Lisa Nemzo	Ralph Stemmann	3:30
5	"If You Walk Away"	Skip Adams, Todd Cerney	Christian De Walden, Steve Singer	4:11
6	"Window of My Heart" (with Mark Bautista)	Charles Williams	Williams	4:41
7	"Strange Are the Ways of Love"	Ferdinand Dimadura	Voltaire Carandang	4:10
8	"Promise Me"	Beverly Craven	Vic Oria	4:03
9	"It Wasn't Enough"	Williams	Williams	4:03
10	"Number One"	De Walden, Michael Mishaw, Carlos Toro Montoro, Singer	Franco Boccuzzi, Paul Mirkovich	4:15
11	"The Sweetest Vice"	De Walden, Mike Shepstone, Stemmann	Stemmann	3:40
12	"Days to Come"	Diane Birch, Byron Brizuela		4:07
13	"Palm Reader"	Alberto Mastrofrancesco, Vito Mastrofrancesco, Singer		3:32
14	"Thank You"	Yman	Regalado	4:23
15	"Good Love" (bonus track)	Bernd Meinunger, Montoro, Alfons Weindorf		4:01

== Personnel ==
Credits were taken from Allmusic.

Production

- David Bacon - programming, mixing
- Franco Boccuzzi - arranger, keyboards, programming
- Walter Clissen - engineer
- Vincent Del Rosario - executive producer
- Christian De Walden - arranger, producer
- Vanni G. - programming, mixing
- George Landress - engineer
- Paul Mirkovich - arranger, programming
- Carlo Nasi - producer
- Eric Payumo - mixing
- Nino Regalado - arranger
- Romer Rosellon - engineer, mixing
- Ronnie Salvacion - photography
- Steve Singer - arranger, programming, producer
- Ralph Stemmann - arranger, programming, producer, synclavier
- Eugene Villaluz - producer, supervising producer
- Luca Vittori - engineer, mixing
- Charles Williams (and his Concert Orchestra) - arranger, engineer, mixing

Musicians

- Mark Bautista - lead vocals (track 6)
- Franco Boccuzzi - keyboards
- Dennis Clarke - background vocals
- Paulinho Da Costa - percussion
- Rachelle Ann Go - lead vocals
- James Harrah - guitar
- Paul Jackson, Jr. - guitar
- Bambi Jones - background vocals
- Brandy Jones - background vocals
- Abraham Laboriel, Sr. - bass
- Sylvia Macaraeg - background vocals
- Paul Mirkovich - keyboards
- Michael Mishaw - background vocals
- Moy Ortiz - background vocals
- Rafael Padilla - percussion
- Dean Parks - guitar
- Tim Pierce - guitar
- Ralph Stemmann - synthesizer, keyboards
- Charles Williams (and his Concert Orchestra) - performer

== Certifications ==
Country	Provider	Certification	Sales
Philippines	PARI	Gold	15,000+

== Release history ==
Country	Release date	Format
Philippines	January 10, 2006	Standard (CD)
United States	June 1, 2005	Standard (download)
