= Rachelle Ann Rocks Live! =

Live album by Rachelle Ann Go
- Released: 2008
- Recorded: 2008
- Genre: Rock
- Label: VIVA Records

Rachelle Ann Go chronology
Obsession (2007)	Rachelle Ann Rocks Live! (2008)	Falling in Love (2009)

Singles from Rachelle Ann Go Rocks Live!
- 1. "Honestly"; 2. "Crying"; 3. "The Search Is Over"; 4. "Someone"

Rachelle Ann Rocks Live! is the first live cover album by Filipina singer Rachelle Ann Go. Recorded at Live at 19 East in 2008, the album marks Go's first attempt to do a live album featuring cover versions of song by Survivor, Bon Jovi, The Rembrandts, Bryan Adams, Ambrosia, and Aerosmith, among others. It was her fourth album.

== Release ==
Released in 2008, the album's first single was a cover of the Harem Scarem song "Honestly", which dominated the charts in the same week it was released. VIVA later announced that her next single was an Aerosmith revival, "Cryin'", but because the single was exclusive to MTV Southeast Asia, VIVA Records instead used her own version of "The Search Is Over". Her third single was a cover of the Amy Grant song, "That's What Love Is For". According to Viva Records, as of November 2008, seven months from its release, the album has already achieved a Gold Record Status for its outstanding sale of more than 12,500.

There were originally 16 tracks in the album, but the three songs were cut, namely "After the Rain" (Nelson), "To Be with You" (Mr. Big), and "Set You Free". The three tracks were later included in the DVD release.

== Track listing ==
1. "The Search Is Over" (4:47)
2. "This Ain't a Love Song" (4:46)
3. "Someone" (4:13)
4. "When You Love Someone" (3:41)
5. "I Just Can't Let Go" (5:06)
6. "Cryin'" (4:42)
7. "Can't Cry Hard Enough" (3:56)
8. "No Rain" (3:11)
9. "Can't Fight This Feeling" (4:34)
10. "Honestly" (4:07)
11. "Missing You" (4:33)
12. "Two Steps Behind" (3:45)
13. "That's What Love Is For" (5:55)

== DVD track listing ==
1. "After the Rain"
2. "To Be with You"
3. "The Search Is Over" (4:47)
4. "This Ain't a Love Song" (4:46)
5. "Someone" (4:13)
6. "When You Love Someone" (3:41)
7. "I Just Can't Let Go" (5:06)
8. "Crying" (4:42)
9. "Can't Cry Hard Enough" (3:56)
10. "No Rain" (3:11)
11. "Can't Fight This Feeling" (4:34)
12. "Honestly" (4:07)
13. "Missing You" (4:33)
14. "Steps Behind" (3:45)
15. "That's What Love Is For" (5:55)
