= Salbakuta =

Filipino rap group

- Origin: Parañaque, Philippines
- Genres: Pinoy hip hop; pop-rap
- Years active: 2001–present
- Label: Dongalo Wreckords
- Members: Charlie Mac; Mad Killah; Jawtee
- Past members: Bendeatha; NastyMac (deceased)

Salbakuta is a Filipino rap group formed by Andrew E. The group achieved mainstream success with their breakout single "S2pid Luv" whose hook heavily interpolates Barbra Streisand's "Evergreen".

== Career ==
Initially working as personal assistants for Andrew E., the group's name originated from when Andrew E. asked the members to come up with a name. Charlie Mac, who is of Bicolano descent, explained in an interview that the term "salbakuta" is Bicolano for "naughty" or "mischievous".

The group rose to prominence in 2001 with their single "S2pid Luv", which Andrew E. penned as they were looking for a radio-friendly single for their debut album Ayoko ng Ganitong Life ("I Hate This Kind of Life"). Despite some controversy over the group's use of explicit lyrics (the album cover already bearing a parental disclaimer similar to the Parental Advisory label used on Western albums) and the Barbra Streisand-derived hook, "S2pid Luv" proved to be a breakthrough single for the group, also spawning a feature-length romantic comedy film adaptation in 2002 starring Andrew E. and Blakdyak. An alternate version of "S2pid Luv" with an original hook in Tagalog instead of the "Evergreen" sample was later released and also featured Blakdyak.

== Members ==
- Charliemac
- MadKilla
- Jawtee
- BenDeatha
- NastyMac

== Discography ==
=== Albums ===
- Ayoko ng Ganitong Life (2001)
- S2pid Luv OST (2002)
- Meron Ka Bang Ganitong Life (2003)
- Pang-romansa Espesyal (2005)
- Rebirth (2014)

=== Singles ===
- "Stupid Love" (2001)
- "Di Karapat Dapat" (2002)
- "Yo Gloria" (feat. Rachelle Ann Go) (2004)
- "Wag Kang Magtaka" (feat. Baby Bell) (2012)
- "Mabuti Na Lang" (feat. Jay R) (2013)
- "Sa Una Lang Pala" (feat. R-Jay) (2017)
- "Bounce" (2021)
- "Chipipay Rap" (2021)
- "Paborito Kong Petchay" (2021)
- "Jawtee Bano" (2021)
- "Nang Ma-in Love Ako Sayo" (2021)
