= Obsession (Rachelle Ann Go album) =

Studio album by Rachelle Ann Go
- Released: 2007
- Recorded: 2006
- Genre: Pop
- Length: 43:26
- Label: VIVA

Rachelle Ann Go chronology
I Care (2006)	Obsession (2007)	Rachelle Ann Rocks Live! (2008)

Singles from Obsession
- 1. "Don't Say Goodbye"; 2. "Alam Ng Ating Mga Puso"

Obsession is the third studio album by Filipina singer Rachelle Ann Go, released in 2007. Singles released from the album include "Alam Ng ating Mga Puso" and "Don't Say Goodbye".

== Track listing ==
1. "And Me U"
2. "Alam Ng Ating Mga Puso"
3. "This Must Be Love"
4. "Don't Say Goodbye"
5. "You Are My Obsession"
6. "I'm sure"
7. "And You Love Me"
8. "Iyong-iyo"
9. "Walk Into My Life"
10. "Somethings In the Air"
11. "My Forever Love"
12. "I Will Always Love You Anyway"
13. "Come One Day"
