= Falling in Love (Rachelle Ann Go album) =

Studio album by Rachelle Ann Go
- Released: January 12, 2009
- Recorded: 2008
- Genre: Pop, Soul
- Language: English
- Label: VIVA
- Producer: Vic del Rosario Jr. (executive), Tony Ocampo (executive), Vincent del Rosario (executive), Eugene Villaluz (album), Baby A. Gil (supervising), MG O. Mozo (supervising), Guia Gil-Ferrer (associate)

Rachelle Ann Go chronology
Rachelle Ann Rocks Live! (2008)	Falling in Love (2009)	Unbreakable (2011)

Singles from Falling in Love
- 1. "This Time I'll Be Sweeter" Released: 2009; 2. "Let the Pain Remain" Released: 2009

Falling in Love is the fifth album by Rachelle Ann Go, released on January 12, 2009. The album, which is composed of revivals, brings Rachelle Ann back to her roots after she experimented with a more upbeat style in her previous album, Rachelle Ann Rocks Live!.

Speaking about the album, Go said "this is the kind of music that best reflects who I am and where I am right now in my life... All the albums that I've done are very special to me, but this one is the most special so far. I think people will understand why."

Falling in Love includes "If" by Bread; "Of All the Things" by Dennis Lambert; "I'll Always Love You" by Taylor Dayne; "Somebody Waiting" by Karen Wyman; "I Got Caught Dancing Again" by The Hues Corporation; "If You Don't Know Me by Now" originally by Harold Melvin & the Blue Notes, but now better known as a hit by Simply Red; "Didn't We" by Jim Webb; "Let the Pain Remain", a Willy Cruz composition popularized by Basil Valdez; "Traces" by Classics IV, which was also successfully covered by the Lettermen; "This Time I'll Be Sweeter" by Angela Bofill; "You and Me Against the World" by Helen Reddy; "You and I" by Petula Clark from the motion picture Goodbye, Mr. Chips; and the Jerome Kern and Oscar Hammerstein II composition "All the Things You Are".

To date, this album has produced two revival hits, "This Time I'll Be Sweeter" and the OPM piece, "Let the Pain Remain". As of December 13, after eleven months from its release, Falling in Love was awarded the Gold Certification by VIVA Music and PARI for outstanding sales of more than 15,000 units.

== Track listing ==
No.	Title	Writer(s)	Original artist(s)	Length
1.	"If"	David Gates	Bread	3:01
2.	"Of All the Things"	Dennis Lambert, Brian Potter	Dennis Lambert	3:16
3.	"I'll Always Love You"	Jimmy George	Taylor Dayne	3:48
4.	"Somebody Waiting"	Roger Nichols, Paul Williams	Karen Wyman	4:40
5.	"I Got Caught Dancing Again"	Wally Holmes	The Hues Corporation	3:21
6.	"If You Don't Know Me by Now"	Kenneth Gamble, Leon Huff	Harold Melvin & the Blue Notes	3:25
7.	"Didn't We"	Jimmy Web	Jim Web	3:15
8.	"Feelings"	Morris Albert	Basil Valdez	3:55
9.	"Let the Pain Remain"	Willy Cruz		4:40
10.	"Traces"	Buddy Buie, James Cobb, E. Gordy	Classics IV	3:04
11.	"This Time I'll Be Sweeter"	Haras Fyre (Pat Grant), G. Guthrie	Angela Bofill	4:25
12.	"You and Me Against the World"	Kenny Ascher, Paul Williams	Helen Reddy	3:39
13.	"You and I"	Leslie Bricusse	Petula Clark	3:21
14.	"All the Things You Are"	Oscar Hammerstein II, Jerome Kern		3:15

== Personnel ==
- Vic del Rosario Jr. - executive producer
- Tony Ocampo - executive producer
- Vincent del Rosario - executive producer
- Eugene Villaluz - album producer
- Baby A. Gil - supervising producer
- MG O. Mozo - supervising producer
- Guia Gil-Ferrer - associate producer
- Joel Mendoza - recorded, mixed & mastered at Amerasian Studios
- Paul Basinillo - creative director
- Denim Inc. - concept & design
- Mia Marigomen - concept & design
- Jay Mongado - concept & design
- Grace Castaneda - concept & design
- Dittle - concept & design
- Sara Black - photography
- Bem Abeleda - hair & make-up
- Janet dela Fuente - styling

=== Acknowledgements ===
- Black Tube Dress by: Eric delos Santos
- Embellished Purple & Black Dress by: Tina Daniac
- Silver Gray Dress by: Joel Escober
- Gray Haltered Dress by: Eric delos Santos
- Accessories by: Victoria Marin (Greenbelt 5)
- Special Thanks to Lawrence Cua of Bench & Charles & Keith
