= Search for a Star =

Philippine television reality show

- Title card
- Genre: Reality competition
- Presented by: Regine Velasquez
- Opening theme: "Search for a Star" by Regine Velasquez
- Country of origin: Philippines
- Original language: Tagalog
- No. of episodes: 39

Production
- Production locations: GMA Network Center, Quezon City, Philippines
- Camera setup: Multiple-camera setup
- Running time: 45 minutes
- Production companies: GMA Entertainment TV; Viva Television

Original release
- Network: GMA Network
- Release: June 21, 2003 – March 13, 2004

Search for a Star is a Philippine television reality competition show broadcast by GMA Network. Hosted by Regine Velasquez, it premiered on June 21, 2003. The show concluded on March 13, 2004, with a total of 39 episodes.

== Grand finalists ==
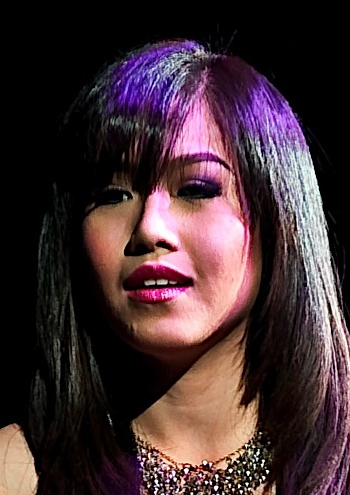
Rachelle Ann Go serves as the winner.

- Rachelle Ann Go (winner)
- Raymond Manalo
- Tina Braganza
- Jerrianne Mae Templo
- Iris Malazarte
- Sarah Jean Badana
- Romelo Valeña
- Cheryl Sweet Ubasa
- Maria Camille Rellevo
- Genevieve Villabroza
