= In Your Eyes (George Benson song) =

Single by George Benson

from the album In Your Eyes
- Released: 1983
- Genre: R&B
- Length: 3:23
- Label: Warner Bros.
- Songwriters: Dan Hill, Michael Masser
- Producer: Arif Mardin

George Benson singles chronology
"Feel Like Makin' Love" (1983)	"In Your Eyes" (1983)	"20/20" (1984)

"In Your Eyes" is a song by American singer George Benson, released as a single in 1983. It entered the UK Singles Chart on 24 September 1983 and reached a peak position of number 7. The song remained on the chart for 10 weeks. It was written by Michael Masser (music) and Dan Hill (lyrics) and was initially recorded by Hill for his 1983 album Love in the Shadows. It was also covered by Jeffrey Osborne in 1986. Hill would re-record the song in 1993 (10 years later) as a duet with Rique Franks, on the album Let Me Show You - Greatest Hits and More.

== Chart history ==
George Benson

Chart (1983–84)	Peak position
Canada RPM Adult Contemporary	7
UK Singles (Official Charts)	7
US Adult Contemporary (Billboard)	30

Jeffrey Osborne

Chart (1986–87)	Peak position
Canada Adult Contemporary (RPM)	22
US Adult Contemporary (Billboard)	15
US Hot R&B/Hip-Hop Songs (Billboard)	82

== Other versions ==
In 1984, Regine Velasquez (formerly known as Chona Velasquez) sang the song as her winning piece in Ang Bagong Kampeon. Fifteen years later, she recorded the song for her covers album R2K.
