= Kate Bush discography =

Cataloguing of published recordings by Kate Bush

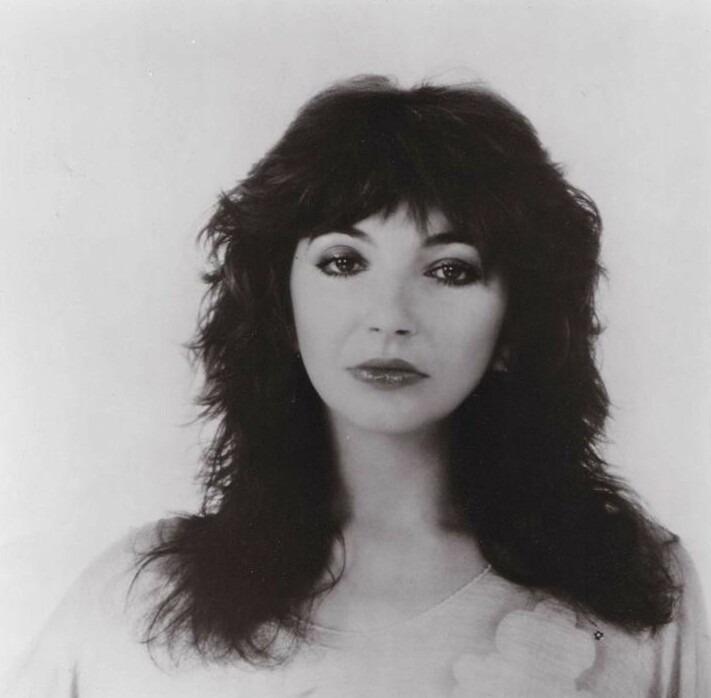
- Bush in 1982
- Studio albums: 10
- Extended plays: 5
- Live albums: 2
- Compilation albums: 2
- Singles: 40
- Video albums: 6
- Music videos: 39
- Box sets: 4
- Promotional singles: 7

English singer-songwriter Kate Bush has released ten studio albums, two live albums, two compilation albums, six video albums, four box sets, five extended plays, 40 singles, seven promotional singles, and 39 music videos.

== Albums ==
=== Studio albums ===
List of albums, with selected chart positions
Title	Album details	Peak chart positions										Certifications
Title	Album details	UK	AUS	CAN	GER	FRA	NL	NZ	NOR	SWE	US	Certifications
The Kick Inside	Released: 17 February 1978; Label: EMI; Formats: LP, cassette, 8-track, CD, digital download, streaming	3	3	95	21	3	1	2	4	8	—	BPI: Platinum; ARIA: Platinum; MC: Platinum; NVPI: Platinum; RMNZ: Platinum
Lionheart	Released: 10 November 1978; Label: EMI; Formats: LP, cassette, 8-track, CD, digital download, streaming	6	12	—	25	—	5	5	5	16	— (Note: Lionheart reached number 201 on Billboard's Album chart in 1984)	BPI: Platinum; ARIA: Platinum; MC: Platinum; NVPI: Gold; RMNZ: Gold
Never for Ever	Released: 8 September 1980; Label: EMI; Formats: LP, cassette, CD, digital download, streaming	1	7	44	5	1	4	31	2	16	—	BPI: Gold; BVMI: Gold; MC: Platinum; NVPI: Gold; FRA: Gold
The Dreaming	Released: 13 September 1982; Label: EMI; Formats: LP, cassette, CD, digital download, streaming	3	22	29	23	8	5	—	12	45	157	BPI: Silver
Hounds of Love	Released: 16 September 1985; Label: EMI; Formats: LP, cassette, CD, digital download, streaming	1	6	7	2	9	1	17	12	9	12 (Note: Hounds of Love reached a peak of number 30 on the US Billboard 200 when the album was originally released in 1985. After renewed interest in the album in 2022, Hounds of Love reached a new peak of number 12.)	BPI: 2× Platinum; BVMI: Platinum; MC: Platinum; NVPI: Gold; FRA: Gold
The Sensual World	Released: 16 October 1989; Label: EMI / Columbia (US); Formats: LP, cassette, CD, CD+cassette, MiniDisc, DCC, digital download, streaming	2	30	17	10	38	16	27	7	17	43	BPI: Platinum; MC: Gold; RIAA: Gold; FRA: Gold
The Red Shoes	Released: 1 November 1993; Label: EMI; Formats: LP, cassette, MiniDisc, CD, CD+VHS, digital download, streaming, 2×LP	2	17	13	18	14	23	30	—	16	28	BPI: Platinum; MC: Gold
Aerial	Released: 7 November 2005; Label: EMI / Columbia (US); Formats: 2×CD, cassette, 2×LP, digital download, streaming	3	25	—	3	12	7	22	4	7	48	BPI: Platinum; BVMI: Gold; MC: Platinum; FRA: Gold
Director's Cut	Released: 16 May 2011; Label: Fish People / EMI; Formats: CD, 2×LP, digital download, streaming	2	41	66	11	31	6	38	2	12	— (Note: Director's Cut reached number 186 on Billboard's United States Top Current Albums chart and never entered the Billboard 200, which ranks catalog LPs along with recent albums.)	BPI: Gold
50 Words for Snow	Released: 21 November 2011; Label: Fish People / EMI; Formats: CD, 2×LP, digital download, streaming	5	22	39	7	21	10	39	13	13	83	BPI: Gold
"—" denotes a recording that did not chart or was not released in that territory.

=== Live albums ===
List of live albums, with selected chart positions
Title	Album details	Peak chart positions										Certifications
Title	Album details	UK	AUS	CAN	FRA	GER	NL	SWE	US	US Alt	US Rock	Certifications
Live at Hammersmith Odeon	Released: 8 August 1994; Label: EMI; Formats: VHS, betamax, laserdisc, CD+VHS	—	—	—	—	—	—	—	—	—	—	
Before the Dawn	Released: 25 November 2016; Label: Fish People, Concord, Noble & Brite; Formats: 3×CD, 4×LP, digital download, streaming	4	35	89	52	14	11	45	121	5	11	BPI: Gold

=== Compilation albums ===
List of compilation albums, with selected chart positions
Title	Album details	Peak chart positions										Certifications
Title	Album details	UK	AUS	CAN	GER	JPN	NL	NZ	NOR	SWE	US	Certifications
Kate Bush	Released: 1984; Label: Amiga (East Germany); Formats: LP, cassette	Not released in these countries.										
The Whole Story	Released: 10 November 1986; Label: EMI; Formats: LP, CD, cassette	1	28	27	11	38	22	4	10	48	76	BPI: 4× Platinum; BVMI: Gold; MC: Gold
The Other Sides	Released: 8 March 2019; Label: Fish People, Rhino Records; Formats: 4×CD	18	—	—	56	—	—	—	—	—	—	
The Best of the Other Sides	Released: 26 September 2025; Label: Fish People; Formats: Digital download, streaming, CD, vinyl	— (Note: "Best of the Other Sides" did not enter the UK Albums Chart Top 100, but debuted at number 16 on the Albums Downloads Chart; number 22 on the UK Physical Albums Chart; number 12 on the UK Vinyl Albums Chart; and at number 9 on the UK Independent Albums Chart.)	—	—	—	—	—	—	—	—	—	

=== Box sets ===
Title	Album details	Peak chart positions		
Title	Album details	UK	AUS	GER
The Single File 1978~1983	Released: 23 January 1984; Label: EMI; Formats: 12x7-inch	—	—	—
This Woman's Work: Anthology 1978–1990	Released: 22 October 1990; Label: EMI; Formats: 9×LP, 8×CD, 7×Cassette	—	143	—
Remastered Part I (Remastered Parts I-II in Vinyl)	Released: 16 November 2018; Label: Fish People, Parlophone, Rhino; Formats: 7×CD, 8×LP, digital download, streaming	51	—	33
Remastered Part II (Remastered Parts III-IV in Vinyl)	Released: 30 November 2018; Label: Fish People, Parlophone, Rhino, Novercia Overseas; Formats: 11×CD, 10×LP, digital download, streaming	81	—	64

== Extended plays ==
List of extended plays, with selected chart positions
Title	Details	Peak chart positions			
Title	Details	UK	IRE	NLD	US
4 Sucessos (two-part release)	Released: 1978; Label: EMI (Brazil); Formats: 7-inch vinyl	—	—	—	—
Kate Bush On Stage	Released: 31 August 1979; Label: EMI; Formats: 7-inch vinyl, 12-inch vinyl, cassette, 2x7-inch vinyl	10	15	17	—
Kate Bush	Released: 15 June 1983; Label: EMI (US & Can); Formats: 12-inch vinyl, cassette	—	—	—	148
Aspects of the Sensual World	Released: 1990; Label: Columbia (US) / Capitol (Canada); Formats: CD	—	—	—	—
Hounds of Love (Record Store Day limited release)	Released: 16 April 2011; Label: Audio Fidelity; Format: 10-inch vinyl	—	—	—	—
"—" denotes a recording that did not chart or was not released in that territory.

== Singles ==
List of singles, with selected chart positions
Title	Year	Peak chart positions										Certifications	Album
Title	Year	UK	AUS	BEL	CAN	FRA	GER	IRE	NLD	NZL	US	Certifications	Album
"Wuthering Heights"	1978	1	1	6	—	14	11	1	3	1	— (Note: "Wuthering Heights" did not enter the US Hot 100, but peaked at number 8 on the US Bubbling Under Hot 100 (Billboard))	BPI: Platinum; RMNZ: Platinum; ARIA: Gold	The Kick Inside
"Moving"	1978	—	—	—	—	—	—	—	—	—	—		The Kick Inside
"The Man with the Child in His Eyes"	1978	6	22	—	—	—	—	3	23	36	85	BPI: Silver	The Kick Inside
"Them Heavy People"	1978	—	—	—	—	—	—	—	21	—	—		The Kick Inside
"Hammer Horror"	1978	44	17	—	—	—	—	10	25	21	—		Lionheart
"Wow"	1979	14	—	—	— (Note: "Wow" peaked at number 28 on the Canadian Adult Contemporary Chart.)	—	—	17	—	—	—		Lionheart
"Symphony in Blue"	1979	—	—	—	—	—	—	—	—	—	—		Lionheart
"Strange Phenomena"	1979	—	—	—	—	—	—	—	—	—	—		The Kick Inside
"Breathing"	1980	16	—	—	—	—	—	—	44	—	—		Never for Ever
"Babooshka"	1980	5	2	—	—	4	14	5	24	8	—	BPI: Gold; RMNZ: Gold	Never for Ever
"Army Dreamers"	1980	16	—	—	—	—	—	14	25	—	—	BPI: Gold	Never for Ever
"December Will Be Magic Again"	1980	29	—	—	—	—	55	13	—	—	—		Non-album single
"Sat in Your Lap"	1981	11	93	—	—	72	—	18	32	—	—		The Dreaming
"The Dreaming"	1982	48	91	—	—	—	—	—	—	—	—		The Dreaming
"There Goes a Tenner"	1982	93	—	—	—	—	—	—	—	—	—		The Dreaming
"Suspended in Gaffa"	1982	—	—	—	—	33	—	—	50	—	—		The Dreaming
"Ne t'enfuis pas"	1983	— (Note: "Ne t'enfuis pas" peaked at number 1 on the UK Vinyl Singles and UK Physical Singles charts, respectively, upon re-release in 2019.)	—	—	—	—	—	—	—	—	—		Non-album single
"Night of the Swallow"	1983	—	—	—	—	—	—	—	—	—	—		The Dreaming
"Running Up That Hill"	1985	3	6	6	16	24	3	4	6	26	30	BPI: Silver	Hounds of Love
"Cloudbusting"	1985	20	—	16	—	30	20	13	13	—	— (Note: "Cloudbusting" did not enter the US Hot 100, but peaked at number 22 on the US Alternative Digital Song Sales chart, in 2019.)	BPI: Gold	Hounds of Love
"Hounds of Love"	1986	18	—	—	84	—	68	12	—	—	—	BPI: Silver	Hounds of Love
"The Big Sky"	1986	37	—	—	—	—	—	15	—	—	—		Hounds of Love
"Don't Give Up" (with Peter Gabriel)	1986	9	5	9	40	36	27	4	5	16	72	RMNZ: Gold	So
"Experiment IV"	1986	23	—	—	—	—	50	12	—	—	—		The Whole Story
"The Sensual World"	1989	12	44	31	58	81	29	6	20	—	— (Note: "The Sensual World" did not enter the US Hot 100, but peaked at number 6 on the US Alternative Airplay chart.)		The Sensual World
"This Woman's Work"	1989	25	89	—	—	—	—	20	—	—	— (Note: "This Woman's Work" did not enter the Billboard Hot 100 upon initial release, but peaked at number 24 on the Digital Song Sales chart in 2023.)	BPI: Platinum	The Sensual World
"Love and Anger"	1990	38	145	—	—	—	—	—	—	—	— (Note: "Love and Anger" did not enter the US Hot 100, but peaked at number 1 on the US Alternative Airplay chart.)		The Sensual World
"Rocket Man"	1991	12	2	—	—	45	36	17	27	—	— (Note: "Rocket Man" did not enter the US Hot 100, but peaked at number 11 on the US Alternative Airplay chart.)		Two Rooms
"Rubberband Girl"	1993	12	39	47	50	—	65	17	37	34	88		The Red Shoes
"Moments of Pleasure"	1993	26	119	—	—	—	—	—	—	—	—		The Red Shoes
"The Red Shoes"	1994	21	—	—	—	—	—	—	—	—	—		The Red Shoes
"Eat the Music"	1994	— (Note: "Eat the Music" was not originally released as a single in the United Kingdom. It was release a 12" vinyl single in 2024, which saw "Eat the Music" debut and peak at number 2 on the UK Singles Sales, UK Physical Singles and UK Vinyl Singles charts, respectively.)	133	—	—	—	—	—	—	—	— (Note: "Eat the Music" did not enter the US Billboard Hot 100, but peaked at number 10 on the US Alternative Airplay Chart and at number 31 on the US Dance Singles Sales Chart.)		The Red Shoes
"The Man I Love" (with Larry Adler)	1994	27	199	—	—	—	—	—	—	—	—		The Glory of Gershwin
"And So Is Love"	1994	26	—	—	—	—	—	—	—	—	—		The Red Shoes
"King of the Mountain"	2005	4	—	—	5	—	42	13	13	—	—		Aerial
"Lyra"	2007	187	—	—	—	—	—	—	—	—	—		The Golden Compass soundtrack
"Deeper Understanding"	2011	87	—	—	—	92	—	—	—	—	—		Director's Cut
"Wild Man"	2011	73	—	—	—	—	—	—	—	—	—		50 Words for Snow
"Running Up That Hill (A Deal with God)" (2012 remix)	2012	6	—	—	—	—	—	22	—	—	—		A Symphony of British Music
"Running Up That Hill (A Deal with God)" (2022 re-release)	2022	1	1	1	2	3	3	1	3	1	3	BPI: 4× Platinum; BVMI: Gold; MC: 2× Platinum; RMNZ: 3× Platinum	Stranger Things: Season 4
"Snowflake"	2024	— (Note: "Snowflake" did not enter the UK Singles Charts, but debuted and peaked at number 91 on the UK Singles Downloads Chart on 1 November 2024.)	—	—	—	—	—	—	—	—	—		50 Words for Snow
"—" denotes a recording that did not chart or was not released in that territory.

=== Promotional singles ===
List of singles
Title	Year	Album
"Be Kind to My Mistakes"	1987	Castaway soundtrack
"π"	2005	Aerial
"Lake Tahoe"	2012	50 Words for Snow
"And Dream of Sheep" (live)	2016	Before the Dawn
"King of the Mountain" (live)	2016	Before the Dawn
"Cloudbusting" (The Organon Remix) (promo re-release)	2019	The Other Sides
"Ne t'enfuis pas" / "Un baiser d'enfant" (promo re-release)	2019	The Other Sides

== Videography ==
=== Video albums ===
Title	Album details	Peak chart positions
Title	Album details	UK Music Videos
Live at Hammersmith Odeon	Released: 1981; Label: EMI / Picture Music International; Formats: VHS, Betamax, Laserdisc	—
The Single File	Released: 1983; Label: Picture Music International; Formats: VHS, Betamax	—
The Hair of the Hound	Released: 1986; Label: Picture Music International; Formats: VHS, Betamax, Laserdisc	—
The Whole Story	Released: 1987; Label: Picture Music International; Formats: VHS, Laserdisc, Video CD	—
The Sensual World – The Videos	Released: 1990; Label: Columbia Music Video; Formats: VHS, Laserdisc	—
The Red Shoes	Released: 1993; Label: EMI; Formats: Box-set, VHS, CD	23
The Line, the Cross and the Curve	Released: October 25, 1994; Label: Picture Music International / EMI, Sony Legacy; Formats: VHS, Laserdisc	—

=== Music videos ===
Year	Title	Director
1978	"Wuthering Heights" (Version 1)	Keith "Keef" MacMillan
1978	"Wuthering Heights" (Version 2)	Rockflix
1978	"The Man with the Child in His Eyes"	Keith "Keef" MacMillan
1978	"Hammer Horror"	Keith "Keef" MacMillan
1979	"Wow" (Version 1)	Keith "Keef" MacMillan
1979	"Wow" (Version 2)	Keith "Keef" MacMillan
1979	"Them Heavy People"	Keith "Keef" MacMillan
1980	"Breathing"	Keith "Keef" MacMillan
1980	"Babooshka"	Keith "Keef" MacMillan
1980	"Delius"	Keith "Keef" MacMillan
1980	"Army Dreamers"	Keith "Keef" MacMillan
1981	"Sat in Your Lap"	Brian Wiseman
1982	"The Dreaming"	Paul Henry
1982	"There Goes a Tenner"	Paul Henry
1982	"Suspended in Gaffa"	Brian Wiseman
1985	"Running Up That Hill"	David Garfath
1985	"Cloudbusting"	Julian Doyle
1986	"Hounds of Love"	Kate Bush
1986	"The Big Sky"	Kate Bush
1986	"Don't Give Up" (Version 1)	Godley & Creme
1986	"Don't Give Up" (Version 2)	Jim Blashfield
1986	"Experiment IV"	Kate Bush
1986	"Wow" (Version 3)	n/a
1989	"The Sensual World"	Peter Richardson & Kate Bush
1989	"This Woman's Work"	Kate Bush
1990	"Love and Anger"	Kate Bush
1991	"Rocket Man"	Kate Bush
1993	"Rubberband Girl"	Kate Bush
1993	"Eat the Music"	Kate Bush
1993	"Moments of Pleasure"	Kate Bush
1993	"Rubberband Girl" (US version)	n/a
1994	"The Red Shoes"	Kate Bush
1994	"The Man I Love"	Kevin Godley
1994	"And So Is Love"	Kate Bush
2005	"King of the Mountain"	Jimmy Murakami
2011	"Deeper Understanding"	Kate Bush
2011	"Wild Man"	Kate Bush
2011	"Misty"	Kate Bush
2012	"Lake Tahoe"	Kate Bush
2016	"And Dream of Sheep"	Kate Bush
2024	"Snowflake"	Kate Bush

== Other contributions ==
This is a list of original contributions that Bush has made to soundtracks, tribute albums and to other musicians' albums.

- The Unknown Soldier (1980, Harvest) – "You (The Game Part II)" (lead vocals with Roy Harper)
- Peter Gabriel (1980, Charisma) – "Games Without Frontiers" and "No Self Control" (backing vocals with Peter Gabriel)
- Figvres (1982, Polydor) - "Flowers" (backing vocals with Zaine Griff)
- The Seer (1986, Mercury) – "The Seer" (Big Country featuring Kate Bush)
- Ferry Aid - "Let It Be" (1987, CBS) (charity single)
- Dancing On The Couch (1987, Chrysalis) – "The King Is Dead" (Go West featuring Kate Bush)
- The Secret Policeman’s Third Ball – The Music (1987, Virgin Records) (charity concert for Amnesty International: "Running Up That Hill" performed with David Gilmour; comedy song "Do Bears..." performed in duet with Rowan Atkinson)
- Answers to Nothing (1988, Chrysalis) – "Sister and Brother" (co-lead vocals with Midge Ure)
- She's Having a Baby (1988, I.R.S.) – "This Woman's Work"
- The Comic Strip Presents...: "GLC: The Carnage Continues..." (1990) – "Ken", "The Confrontation" and "One Last Look Around the House Before We Go..."
- Once (1990, IRS Records) - "Once" (backing vocals with Roy Harper)
- Brazil (1992, Milan) – "Sam Lowry's 1st Dream/"Brazil"" (vocals with Michael Kamen and The National Philharmonic Orchestra of London)
- Again (1993, Sony Music) – "Kimiad" (keyboards and backing vocals with Alan Stivell)
- The Glory of Gershwin (1994, Mercury) – "The Man I Love" (vocals, with Larry Adler on harmonica)
- Common Ground – Voices of Modern Irish Music (1996, EMI) – "Women of Ireland"
- Emancipation (1996, NPG/EMI) – "My Computer" (backing vocals with Prince)
- The Golden Compass (2007, New Line) – "Lyra"
