= This Woman's Work: Anthology 1978–1990 =

This Woman's Work

Box set by Kate Bush
- Released: 22 October 1990
- Recorded: 1973–1990
- Genre: Art rock; art pop; progressive pop; baroque pop
- Length: 366:55
- Label: EMI
- Producer: Kate Bush; Andrew Powell; Jon Kelly; David Gilmour

Kate Bush chronology
Aspects of the Sensual World (1990)	This Woman's Work (1990)	The Red Shoes (1993)

Professional ratings
Review scores
Source	Rating
AllMusic	4/5 stars
Encyclopedia of Popular Music	4/5 stars
Mojo	5/5 stars
MusicHound Rock	3.5/5 stars
New Musical Express	9/10
Q	4/5 stars
The Rolling Stone Album Guide	4/5 stars
Select	4/5 stars
Spin Alternative Record Guide	7/10

This Woman's Work: Anthology 1978–1990 is a compilation box set by the English singer-songwriter Kate Bush. Released in 1990 on CD, vinyl and cassette; it comprises her six studio albums to that point together with two additional albums of B-sides, rarities and remixes. The box set was re-released on CD only in 1998 in different packaging.

The two rarities discs are entitled This Woman's Work: Volume One and This Woman's Work: Volume Two (in the vinyl edition the twenty-nine tracks are spread over three LPs), and have never been released as albums separately from the box set.

Although publicised as a complete collection of Bush's works up to 1990, many tracks released during this time are missing from this collection including the Single Version Remix of "The Man with the Child in His Eyes", the Single Edit remix of "Wow", the dead-end version of "Army Dreamers" which featured on "The Whole Story" album, "Dreamtime" (the instrumental B-side of "The Dreaming" single), "Sat in Your Lap (Single Mix)", "Running Up that Hill (Instrumental Version)", "The Big Sky (Single Version)", "The Sensual World (Instrumental Version)", "The Confrontation" from the "Love and Anger" single and the Single Version Mix of "This Woman's Work". Various songs featured in films were also omitted, notably "The Magician", from the film The Magician of Lublin.

The set was not released in the US, mainly due to The Sensual World being released there by Columbia Records.

== Track listing ==
All songs written and composed by Kate Bush. Except "In Search of Peter Pan" written by Kate Bush and incorporates "When You Wish Upon A Star" (Lyrics by Ned Washington and Music by Leigh Harline), "Lord of the Reedy River" by Donovan, and "The Handsome Cabin Boy" and "My Lagan Love" which are traditional songs.

=== Disc 1 – The Kick Inside ===
No.	Title	Length
1.	"Moving"	2:58
2.	"The Saxophone Song"	3:51
3.	"Strange Phenomena"	2:57
4.	"Kite"	2:57
5.	"The Man with the Child in His Eyes"	2:39
6.	"Wuthering Heights"	4:35
7.	"James and the Cold Gun"	3:31
8.	"Feel It"	3:00
9.	"Oh to Be in Love"	3:21
10.	"L'Amour Looks Something Like You"	2:26
11.	"Them Heavy People"	3:01
12.	"Room for the Life"	4:11
13.	"The Kick Inside"	3:30
Total length:		43:16

=== Disc 2 – Lionheart ===
No.	Title	Length
1.	"Symphony in Blue"	3:31
2.	"In Search of Peter Pan"	3:58
3.	"Wow"	3:58
4.	"Don't Push Your Foot on the Heartbrake"	3:10
5.	"Oh England My Lionheart"	3:10
6.	"Fullhouse"	3:10
7.	"In the Warm Room"	3:49
8.	"Kashka From Baghdad"	4:00
9.	"Coffee Homeground"	3:41
10.	"Hammer Horror"	4:37
Total length:		36:55

=== Disc 3 – Never for Ever ===
No.	Title	Length
1.	"Babooshka"	3:30
2.	"Delius (Song of Summer)"	2:49
3.	"Blow Away (For Bill)"	3:32
4.	"All We Ever Look For"	3:50
5.	"Egypt"	4:09
6.	"The Wedding List"	4:21
7.	"Violin"	3:21
8.	"The Infant Kiss"	2:45
9.	"Night Scented Stock"	0:50
10.	"Army Dreamers"	2:55
11.	"Breathing"	5:28
Total length:		37:30

=== Disc 4 – The Dreaming ===
No.	Title	Length
1.	"Sat in Your Lap"	3:42
2.	"There Goes a Tenner"	3:25
3.	"Pull Out the Pin"	5:29
4.	"Suspended in Gaffa"	3:59
5.	"Leave It Open"	3:27
6.	"The Dreaming"	4:49
7.	"Night of the Swallow"	5:18
8.	"All the Love"	4:29
9.	"Houdini"	3:50
10.	"Get Out of My House"	5:32
Total length:		43:27

=== Disc 5 – Hounds of Love ===
No.	Title	Length
1.	"Running Up that Hill (A Deal with God)"	4:58
2.	"Hounds of Love"	2:58
3.	"The Big Sky"	4:45
4.	"Mother Stands for Comfort"	3:13
5.	"Cloudbusting"	5:09
6.	"And Dream of Sheep"	2:49
7.	"Under Ice"	2:16
8.	"Waking the Witch"	4:21
9.	"Watching You Without Me"	4:09
10.	"Jig of Life"	4:01
11.	"Hello Earth"	6:16
12.	"The Morning Fog"	2:32
Total length:		47:29

=== Disc 6 – The Sensual World ===
No.	Title	Length
1.	"The Sensual World"	5:16
2.	"Love and Anger"	4:45
3.	"The Fog"	5:14
4.	"Reaching Out"	3:08
5.	"Heads We're Dancing"	5:17
6.	"Deeper Understanding"	4:48
7.	"Between a Man and a Woman"	3:27
8.	"Never Be Mine"	3:51
9.	"Rocket's Tail (For Rocket)"	4:12
10.	"This Woman's Work"	3:30
11.	"Walk Straight Down the Middle"	3:58
Total length:		45:57

=== Disc 7 – This Woman's Work: Volume One ===
No.	Title	Originally appears on	Length
1.	"The Empty Bullring"	"Breathing" 7" (1980)	2:13
2.	"Ran Tan Waltz"	"Babooshka" 7" (1980)	2:39
3.	"Passing Through Air"	"Army Dreamers" 7" (1980)	2:01
4.	"December Will Be Magic Again"	"December Will Be Magic Again" 7" (1980)	4:49
5.	"Warm and Soothing"	"December Will Be Magic Again" 7"	2:42
6.	"Lord of the Reedy River"	"Sat in Your Lap" 7" (1981)	2:42
7.	"Ne T'En Fui Pas" (Title is misspelt, the correct spelling in French being "Ne t'enfuis pas")	"There Goes a Tenner" 7"/"Suspended in Gaffa" 7" (1982)	2:10
8.	"Un Baiser d'Enfant" (French version of "The Infant Kiss", which originally appeared on the 1980 album Never for Ever)	"Ne T'en Fuis Pas" 7" (1983)	3:00
9.	"Under the Ivy"	"Running Up That Hill" 7" (1985)	2:06
10.	"Burning Bridge"	"Cloudbusting" 7" (1985)	4:44
11.	"My Lagan Love"	"Cloudbusting" 12" (1985)	2:29
12.	"The Handsome Cabin Boy"	"Hounds of Love" 7" (1986)	3:11
13.	"Not This Time"	"The Big Sky" 7" (1986)	3:39
14.	"Walk Straight Down the Middle"	"The Sensual World" 7" (1989)	3:51
15.	"Be Kind to My Mistakes"	"This Woman's Work" 7" (1989)	2:59
Total length:			46:07

=== Disc 8 – This Woman's Work: Volume Two ===
No.	Title	Originally appears on	Length
1.	"I'm Still Waiting"	"This Woman's Work" 7" (1989)	4:31
2.	"Ken"	"Love and Anger" 7" (1989)	3:47
3.	"One Last Look Around the House Before We Go"	"Love and Anger" 7"	0:58
4.	"Wuthering Heights" (New vocal)	The Whole Story (1986)	5:02
5.	"Experiment IV"	The Whole Story (1986)	4:19
6.	"Them Heavy People" (Live)	On Stage EP (1979)	4:10
7.	"Don't Push Your Foot on the Heartbrake" (Live)	On Stage EP	3:39
8.	"James and the Cold Gun" (Live)	On Stage EP	6:18
9.	"L'Amour Looks Something Like You" (Live)	On Stage EP	2:47
10.	"Running Up That Hill" (12" mix)	"Running Up That Hill" 12"	5:42
11.	"Cloudbusting" (Organon mix)	"Cloudbusting" 12"	6:36
12.	"Hounds of Love" (Alternative)	"Hounds of Love" 7"	3:51
13.	"The Big Sky" (Meteorological mix)	"The Big Sky" 12" (1986)	8:03
14.	"Experiment IV" (12" mix)	"Experiment IV" 12" (1986)	6:48
Total length:			66:14

== Personnel ==
- Stewart Arnold – backing vocals
- Jimmy Bain – bass
- Ian Bairnson – guitar, backing vocals
- John Barrett – assistant engineer
- Brian Bath – guitar
- Haydn Bendall – engineer
- Michael Berkeley – arranger
- Andrew Boland – engineer
- Stoyanka Boneva – vocals
- Kate Bush – piano, vocals, producer, Fairlight, harmony
- Paddy Bush – mandolin, stick, harmony vocals, slide guitar, mandocello, pan pipes
- George Chambers – assistant engineer
- Nick Cook – assistant engineer
- Danny Dawson – assistant engineer
- Barry DeSouza – drums
- Geoffrey Downes – trumpet
- Pearse Dunne – assistant engineer
- Percy Edwards – vocals
- Stuart Elliott – percussion, drums
- Larry Fast – Prophet 5
- Eva Georgieva – vocals
- John Giblin – bass, fretless bass
- David Gilmour – guitar, backing vocals
- Paul Gomazel – engineer
- Howard Gray – assistant engineer,
- James Guthrie – engineer
- Roy Harper – backing vocals
- Preston Heyman – drums, stick
- Gary Hurst – backing vocals
- Patrick Jaunead – assistant engineer
- Michael Kamen – arranger
- Mick Karn – bass
- David Katz – orchestra contractor
- Nigel Kennedy – viola
- Paul Keogh – guitar
- Kevin Killen – engineer, mixing
- Nick Launay – engineer
- Dave Lawson – arranger, Synclavier
- Tom Leader – engineer
- Dónal Lunny – bouzouki
- Bruce Lynch – bass
- Duncan Mackay – synthesizer, Fender Rhodes
- Kevin McAlea – synthesizer programming
- Medici Sextet – strings
- Max Middleton – Fender Rhodes
- Francis Monkman – Hammond organ
- Mike Moran – Prophet 5
- Alan Murphy – guitar
- Liam O'Flynn – penny whistle, Uilleann pipes
- Hugh Padgham – engineer
- Del Palmer – bass, engineer, Linn
- David Paton – bass
- Morris Pert – percussion
- Adam Skeaping – viol, string arrangements
- Jo Skeaping – string arrangements
- John Sheahan – fiddle, whistle
- Bill Somerville-Large – engineer
- Davy Spillane – whistle, Uilleann pipes
- Alan Stivell – Celtic harp
- Brian Tench – engineer, mixing
- Trio Bulgarka – vocals
- Nigel Walker – engineer, assistant engineer, mixing engineer
- Eberhard Weber – bass
- Bill Whelan – arranger
- Jonathan Williams – cello
- Peter Woolliscroft – digital editing

== Charts ==
Chart (1991)	Peak position
Australian Albums (ARIA)	143
