= The Other Sides =

2019 compilation album by Kate Bush

Compilation album by Kate Bush
- Released: 30 November 2018 (Selection); 8 March 2019 (full set)
- Recorded: 1975–2012
- Length: 132:16 (full set); 42:47 (Selection)
- Languages: English; French; Irish
- Label: Fish People
- Producers: Kate Bush; David Gilmour; Jon Kelly; Andrew Powell; Donal Lunny; George Martin; Michael Kamen

Kate Bush chronology
Before the Dawn (2016)	The Other Sides (2018)

Alternative cover
- Selection from 'The Other Sides' cover

Professional ratings
Review scores
Source	Rating
Classic Pop	9/10
Rolling Stone	4/5 stars

The Other Sides is a compilation album by English singer-songwriter Kate Bush. Released in March 2019, the set contains a selection of 12" mixes and B-sides as well as a selection of cover versions.

Released as part of Bush's definitive remastering project in 2018, the set was originally included in the Remastered Part II box set, before receiving a separate release in March 2019. The Other Sides charted at number 18 in the UK.

There are some omissions to the rarities and B-sides in the set, including "The Empty Bullring" (B-side to "Breathing"), "Not This Time" (B-side to "The Big Sky"), "Ken" and "The Confrontation" (B-sides to "Love and Anger") as well as single versions of some tracks, instrumental versions, and extended/alternate mixes of "Rubberband Girl", "Eat the Music", "The Red Shoes" and "December Will Be Magic Again".

== Reception ==
Rolling Stone magazine rated The Other Sides 4 out of 5 stars, stating "most of the tracks feel as contemporary as they ever did; maybe more so." Classic Pop magazine rated the set 9/10, stating "it's hard to believe these gems were mere flip-sides".

== Track listing ==
All tracks are written by Kate Bush.

Disc one: 12" Mixes
No.	Title	Originally released	Length
1.	"Running Up That Hill (A Deal with God)"	August 1985	5:49
2.	"The Big Sky" (Meteorological Mix)	April 1986	7:46
3.	"Cloudbusting" (The Organon Mix)	October 1985	6:33
4.	"Hounds of Love" (Alternative Mix)	February 1986	3:49
5.	"Experiment IV" (Extended Mix)	October 1986	6:43
Total length:			30:40

All tracks are written by Kate Bush.

Disc two: The Other Side 1
No.	Title	Originally released	Length
1.	"Walk Straight Down the Middle"	B-side to "The Sensual World" (1989)	3:49
2.	"You Want Alchemy"	B-side to "Eat the Music" (1993) and "The Red Shoes" (1994)	4:21
3.	"Be Kind to My Mistakes"	B-side to "This Woman's Work" (1989)	3:02
4.	"Lyra"	from The Golden Compass (Original Motion Picture Soundtrack) (2007)	3:18
5.	"Under the Ivy"	B-side to "Running Up That Hill (A Deal with God)" (1985)	2:10
6.	"Experiment IV" (Video Mix)	from The Whole Story (1986)	4:49
7.	"Ne t'enfuis pas"	B-side to "There Goes a Tenner" (1982) and "Suspended in Gaffa" (1982)	2:34
8.	"Un Baiser d'enfant"	French version of "The Infant Kiss" (1980); B-side to "Ne t'enfuis pas" (1983)	3:02
9.	"Burning Bridge"	B-side to "Cloudbusting" (1985)	4:12
10.	"Running Up That Hill (A Deal with God)" (2012 Remix)	from A Symphony of British Music (2012)	5:34
Total length:			36:51

All tracks are written by Kate Bush.

Disc three: The Other Side 2
No.	Title	Originally released	Length
1.	"Home for Christmas"	B-side to "Moments of Pleasure" (1993) and "Rubberband Girl" (1993)	1:47
2.	"One Last Look Around the House Before We Go"	B-side to "Love and Anger" (1990)	1:04
3.	"I'm Still Waiting"	B-side to "This Woman's Work" (1989)	4:28
4.	"Warm and Soothing"	B-side to "December Will Be Magic Again" (1980)	2:44
5.	"Show a Little Devotion"	B-side to "Moments of Pleasure" (1993) and "Rubberband Girl" (1993)	4:18
6.	"Passing Through Air"	B-side to "Army Dreamers" (1980), recorded 1973	2:04
7.	"Humming"	previously unreleased, recorded 1975	3:16
8.	"Ran Tan Waltz"	B-side to "Babooshka" (1980)	2:47
9.	"December Will Be Magic Again"	1980 standalone single	4:52
10.	"Wuthering Heights" (New Vocal)	from The Whole Story (1986)	5:03
Total length:			32:23

Disc four: In Other's Words
No.	Title	Writer(s)	Originally released	Length
1.	"Rocket Man"	Elton John; Bernie Taupin	from Two Rooms: Celebrating the Songs of Elton John & Bernie Taupin (1991)	5:01
2.	"Sexual Healing"	Marvin Gaye; Odell Brown	B-side to "King of the Mountain" (2005), recorded 1994	5:55
3.	"Mna Na Heireann"	traditional	from Common Ground: Voices of Modern Irish Music (1996)	2:57
4.	"My Lagan Love"	traditional	B-side to "Cloudbusting" (1985)	2:30
5.	"The Man I Love"	George Gershwin; Ira Gershwin	from The Glory of Gershwin (1994)	3:18
6.	"Brazil (Sam Lowry's First Dream)"	Ary Barroso; Bob Russell	from Brazil: Music from the Original Motion Picture Soundtrack (1993), recorded 1985	2:15
7.	"The Handsome Cabin Boy"	traditional	B-side to "Hounds of Love" (1986)	3:14
8.	"Lord of the Reedy River"	Donovan	B-side to "Sat in Your Lap" (1981)	2:42
9.	"Candle in the Wind"	John; Taupin	B-side to "Rocket Man" (1991)	4:30
Total length:				32:22

All tracks are written by Kate Bush, except where noted.

Selection from 'The Other Sides'
No.	Title	Writer(s)	Length
1.	"12" Running Up That Hill (A Deal with God)"		5:49
2.	"The Big Sky" (Meteorological Mix)		7:46
3.	"Walk Straight Down the Middle"		3:49
4.	"You Want Alchemy"		4:21
5.	"Experiment IV"		4:49
6.	"Running Up That Hill (A Deal with God)" (2012 Remix)		5:34
7.	"Home for Christmas"		1:47
8.	"Sexual Healing"	Gaye; Brown	5:55
9.	"Mna Na Heireann"	traditional	2:57
Total length:			42:47

== Best of the Other Sides (2025) ==
In 2025, it was announced that a shortened version of the album, titled Best of the Other Sides, featuring edited and re-tweaked versions of some of the tracks from The Other Sides would be released on 26 September 2025, digitally, followed by a CD and vinyl release on 31 October 2025. The album reached number 16 on the UK Albums Download Charts.

All tracks are written by Kate Bush, except where noted.

Best of the Other Sides track listing
No.	Title	Writer(s)	Length
1.	"Experiment IV" (remastered 2025)		4:54
2.	"You Want Alchemy?" (remastered 2025)		3:57
3.	"Rocket Man"	Elton John, Bernie Taupin	4:59
4.	"Walk Straight Down the Middle" (remastered 2025)		3:48
5.	"The Big Sky" (Meteorological 12" Mix)		7:45
6.	"The Man I Love"	George Gershwin	3:19
7.	"Under the Ivy"		2:08
8.	"Mná na hÉireann"	Peadar Ó Doirnín (traditional)	2:56
9.	"Lyra"		3:15
10.	"Brazil (Sam Lowry's First Dream)"	Ary Barroso, Bob Russell	2:13
11.	"Running Up That Hill (A Deal with God)" (12" mix)		5:49

== Charts ==
Chart performance for The Other Sides
Chart (2019)	Peak position
Belgian Albums (Ultratop Flanders)	167
Belgian Albums (Ultratop Wallonia)	79
Dutch Albums (Album Top 100)	152
French Albums (SNEP)	181
German Albums (Offizielle Deutsche Charts)	56
Scottish Albums (Official Charts)	13
UK Albums (OCC)	18

Chart performance for Best of the Other Sides
Chart (2025–2026)	Peak position
Scottish Albums (Official Charts)	21
Swiss Albums (Schweizer Hitparade)	35
UK Albums Download Charts (OCC)	16
UK Independent Albums (Official Charts)	9
UK Progressive Albums (Official Charts)	4
UK Vinyl Albums (OCC)	12
