= The Single File =

1983 music video compilation by Kate Bush

The Single File is a video compilation and box set by the English musician Kate Bush. The video compilation album was released in 1983, and it contains the first 12 videos released by the artist. It was followed by a box set, The Single File 1978~1983 containing 13 singles on individual vinyl records.

== The Single File – Video ==
The Single File

Video by Kate Bush
- Released: November 1983
- Recorded: 1977–1982
- Genre: Art rock
- Length: 50 minutes
- Label: EMI/Picture Music International
- Directors: Brian Wiseman, Keef, Paul Henry

Kate Bush chronology
The Dreaming (1982)	The Single File (1983)	Hounds of Love (1985)

Professional ratings
Review scores
Source	Rating
AllMusic	link
Blitz	2/4 stars
Melody Maker	Positive link

The Single File is a 1983 collection of music videos by Kate Bush. It is the second video release by the artist. It was released on VHS, Beta Max and later on Laserdisc in Japan. It features the UK version of "Wuthering Heights" and the original video of "Wow".

=== Track listing ===
1. "Wuthering Heights" - 4:30
2. "The Man with the Child in His Eyes" - 2:49
3. "Hammer Horror" - 4:11
4. "Wow" - 3:47
5. "Them Heavy People" - 4:05
6. "Breathing" - 4:52
7. "Babooshka" - 3:30
8. "Army Dreamers" - 3:16
9. "Sat in Your Lap" - 3:32
10. "The Dreaming" - 4:06
11. "Suspended in Gaffa" - 4:00
12. "There Goes a Tenner" - 3:23

=== Personnel ===
- Paul Henry – Director
- Keef – Director
- Brian Wiseman – Director
- Kate Bush – Artistic Concepts, Choreography By
- Chris Achileos – Babooshka Costume Illustration
- Pamela Keats – Babooshka Costume Realization
- Assorted iMaGes – Packaging
- Kindlight – Photography

== The Single File 1978~1983 – Box Set ==
The Single File 1978~1983

Box set by Kate Bush
- Released: 23 January 1984
- Recorded: 1975–1983
- Genre: Art rock
- Label: EMI
- Producers: Andrew Powell, John Kelly, Kate Bush

Kate Bush chronology
Kate Bush (1983)	The Single File 1978~1983 (1984)	Kate Bush (1985)

Professional ratings
Review scores
Source	Rating
Encyclopedia of Popular Music	3/5 stars
Mojo	3/5 stars

The Single File 1978~1983 is a boxed set released on 23 January 1984, available only on vinyl. It contained all Kate Bush's 7" singles and their B-sides up until that point, and her live EP On Stage. The box set primarily included her UK singles. The European single "Suspended in Gaffa" and the Irish single "Night of the Swallow" were not included but "Ne t'enfuis pas (remix)" single was. The box set also included a lyric book.

"I'm surprised that I've got this amount of material together in five years," Bush remarked. "I'm thrilled, really... I mean, it is a form of 'greatest hits'. It's just put in a box and it's a nicer way of doing it."

=== Track listing ===
Disc 1 (Wuthering Heights)

1. "Wuthering Heights"
2. "Kite"

Disc 2 (The Man with the Child in His Eyes)

3. "The Man with the Child in His Eyes"
4. "Moving"

Disc 3 (Hammer Horror)

5. "Hammer Horror"
6. "Coffee Homeground"

Disc 4 (Wow)

7. "Wow"
8. "Fullhouse"

Disc 5 (Kate Bush on Stage)

9. "Them Heavy People"
10. "Don't Push Your Foot on the Heartbrake"
11. "James and the Cold Gun"
12. "L'Amour Looks Something Like You"

Disc 6 (Breathing)

13. "Breathing"
14. "The Empty Bullring"

Disc 7 (Babooshka)

15. "Babooshka"
16. "Ran Tan Waltz"

Disc 8 (Army Dreamers)

17. "Army Dreamers"
18. "Delius"
19. "Passing Through Air"

Disc 9 (December Will Be Magic Again)

20. "December Will Be Magic Again"
21. "Warm And Soothing"

Disc 10 (Sat in Your Lap)

22. "Sat in Your Lap"
23. "Lord of the Reedy River"

Disc 11 (The Dreaming)

24. "The Dreaming"
25. "Dreamtime (Instrumental)"

Disc 12 (There Goes a Tenner)

26. "There Goes a Tenner"
27. "Ne t'enfuis pas"

Disc 13 (Ne t'enfuis pas)

28. "Ne t'enfuis pas (remix)"
29. "Un baiser d'enfant"
