= The Whole Story =

1986 compilation album by Kate Bush

Greatest hits album by Kate Bush
- Released: 10 November 1986
- Recorded: 1975–1986
- Length: 48:53
- Label: EMI
- Producers: Kate Bush; Jon Kelly; Andrew Powell

Kate Bush chronology
Hounds of Love (1985)	The Whole Story (1986)	The Sensual World (1989)

Singles from The Whole Story
- 1. "Experiment IV" Released: 27 October 1986

Professional ratings
Review scores
Source	Rating
AllMusic	4.5/5 stars
Encyclopedia of Popular Music	4/5 stars
The Great Rock Discography	9/10
Mojo	4/5 stars
MusicHound Rock	4/5 stars
Record Mirror	4/5 stars
Robert Christgau	A−
The Rolling Stone Album Guide	4/5 stars
Sounds	5/5 stars
Spin Alternative Record Guide	9/10

The Whole Story

Video by Kate Bush
- Released: 1986
- Recorded: 1977–1986
- Genre: Art rock
- Length: 55 Minutes
- Labels: EMI; Picture Music International

Kate Bush chronology
The Hair of the Hound (1986)	The Whole Story (1986)	The Sensual World – The Videos (1990)

Professional ratings
Review scores
Source	Rating
AllMovie	3.5/5 stars

The Whole Story is the first compilation album by English singer-songwriter Kate Bush and her first greatest hits album worldwide. Released on 10 November 1986, it earned Bush her third UK number-one album and went on to become her best-selling release to date, being certified four-times platinum in the United Kingdom.

The album includes 11 of Bush's singles. It also includes "Experiment IV", which had been released as a single three weeks earlier; it also reached the UK top 30. A remix of Bush's debut single "Wuthering Heights" (1978) with newly re-recorded vocals opens the album. The album mix of "The Man with the Child in His Eyes" features on this release rather than the single version.

A home video compilation of the same name was released simultaneously, which includes the promotional videos for each song on the album. It was nominated for the Best Concept Music Video at the 1988 Grammy Awards.

In 2014, during Bush's Before the Dawn residency at the Hammersmith Apollo, The Whole Story charted at number 8 in the UK. Following a resurgence of popularity for "Running Up That Hill (A Deal with God)" in 2022, The Whole Story peaked at number 17 on the UK Albums Chart.

== Track listing ==
All tracks are written by Kate Bush.

Side one
No.	Title	Original album	Length
1.	"Wuthering Heights" (New Vocal)	The Kick Inside (1978)	4:57
2.	"Cloudbusting"	Hounds of Love (1985)	5:09
3.	"The Man with the Child in His Eyes"	The Kick Inside	2:38
4.	"Breathing"	Never for Ever (1980)	5:28
5.	"Wow"	Lionheart (1978)	3:46
6.	"Hounds of Love"	Hounds of Love	3:02

Side two
No.	Title	Original album	Length
7.	"Running Up That Hill"	Hounds of Love	5:00
8.	"Army Dreamers"	Never for Ever	3:13
9.	"Sat in Your Lap"	The Dreaming (1982)	3:29
10.	"Experiment IV"	Previously unreleased	4:21
11.	"The Dreaming"	The Dreaming	4:14
12.	"Babooshka"	Never for Ever	3:29
Total length:			48:53

=== Video ===
VHS, Betamax and LaserDisc editions
No.	Title	Length
1.	"Wuthering Heights (Note: "Wuthering Heights" appears on the video in its original 1978 recording.)"	3:34
2.	"Cloudbusting"	6:55
3.	"The Man with the Child in His Eyes"	2:52
4.	"Breathing"	5:31
5.	"Wow (Note: "Wow" appears as a new alternate video, produced specifically for this compilation.)"	3:42
6.	"Hounds of Love"	3:04
7.	"Running Up That Hill"	4:55
8.	"Army Dreamers"	3:17
9.	"Sat in Your Lap"	3:30
10.	"Experiment IV"	4:41
11.	"The Dreaming"	4:09
12.	"Babooshka"	3:26
13.	"The Big Sky"	4:26
Total length:		56:54

VCD edition: The Whole Story '94 — Disc one
No.	Title	Length
1.	"Introduction"
2.	"Wuthering Heights"
3.	"Cloudbusting"
4.	"The Man with the Child in His Eyes"
5.	"Breathing"
6.	"Wow"
7.	"Hounds of Love"
8.	"Running Up That Hill"
9.	"Army Dreamers"
10.	"Sat in Your Lap"
11.	"Experiment IV"

The Whole Story '94 — Disc two
No.	Title	Length
1.	"The Dreaming"
2.	"Babooshka"
3.	"The Big Sky"
4.	"The Sensual World"
5.	"Love & Anger"
6.	"This Woman's Work"
7.	"Rubberband Girl"
8.	"Moments of Pleasure"
9.	"Kate Bush Discography"
10.	"End Credits"

== Personnel ==
- Kate Bush – keyboards, vocals, producer
- Ian Cooper – cutting engineer
- Jon Kelly – producer
- Andrew Powell – producer

== Charts ==
=== Weekly charts ===
1986–1987 weekly chart performance for The Whole Story
Chart (1986–1987)	Peak position
Australian Albums (Kent Music Report)	28
Canada Top Albums/CDs (RPM)	27
Dutch Albums (Album Top 100)	22
European Albums (Music & Media)	11
Finnish Albums (Suomen virallinen lista)	30
German Albums (Offizielle Top 100)	11
Japanese Albums (Oricon)	38
New Zealand Albums (RMNZ)	4
Swedish Albums (Sverigetopplistan)	48
UK Albums (Official Charts)	1
UK CDs (Music Week)	1
US Billboard 200	76

1995 weekly chart performance for The Whole Story
Chart (1995)	Peak position
French Albums (IFOP)	9

2003 weekly chart performance for The Whole Story
Chart (2003)	Peak position
Norwegian Albums (VG-lista)	10

2014 weekly chart performance for The Whole Story
Chart (2014)	Peak position
Dutch Albums (Album Top 100)	45
UK Albums (Official Charts)	6

2022–23 weekly chart performance for The Whole Story
Chart (2022–23)	Peak position
Irish Albums (Official Charts)	27
Portuguese Albums (AFP)	35
UK Albums (Official Charts)	17

=== Year-end charts ===
1986 year-end chart performance for The Whole Story
Chart (1986)	Position
UK Albums (Gallup)	16

1987 year-end chart performance for The Whole Story
Chart (1987)	Position
Australian Albums (Kent Music Report)	91
European Albums (Music & Media)	38
German Albums (Offizielle Top 100)	75
New Zealand Albums (RMNZ)	44
UK Albums (Gallup)	57

2014 year-end chart performance for The Whole Story
Chart (2014)	Position
UK Albums (OCC)	66

=== Bibliography ===
- Kent, David (1993). Australian Chart Book 1970–1992 (illustrated ed.). St Ives, N.S.W.: Australian Chart Book. ISBN 0-646-11917-6.

== Certifications and sales ==
Certifications and sales for The Whole Story
Region	Certification	Certified units/sales
Belgium (BRMA)	Gold	25,000^{*}
Canada (Music Canada)	Gold	50,000^{^}
Germany (BVMI)	Gold	250,000^{^}
New Zealand (RMNZ)	Gold	7,500^{^}
United Kingdom (BPI)	4× Platinum	1,200,000^{^}
United States	—	195,000
Summaries
Worldwide	—	6,000,000
^{*} Sales figures based on certification alone.^{^} Shipments figures based on certification alone.
