= Kate Bush (EP) =

EP by Kate Bush
- Released: 15 June 1983
- Recorded: 1979–82
- Genre: Art rock
- Length: 20:05 (US version); 22:38 (Canadian version)
- Label: EMI America
- Producer: Jon Kelly, Kate Bush

Kate Bush chronology
The Dreaming (1982)	Kate Bush (1983)	The Single File 1978~1983 (1984)

Professional ratings
Review scores
Source	Rating
The Rolling Stone Album Guide	3/5 stars
Spin Alternative Record Guide	4/10

Kate Bush is an eponymous five-song 12" EP. It was released by EMI America in the United States to promote Kate Bush, who was relatively unknown there at that time. It peaked at No. 148 in the US Billboard Pop Albums chart. The EP was also released in Canada where she was well known; the Canadian released featured an extra song.

The cover depicts Bush in the warrior costume she sports in the music video for "Babooshka."

Bush commented on the release: "Quite honestly, I don't think I would have chosen those five. It has very much to do with the record company and what they see a market for. I did want 'Sat In Your Lap' to be on there. It's also quite nice to get the French song on there 'cause I quite like that."

== Track listing ==
All tracks are written by Kate Bush.

Side one
No.	Title	Length
1.	"Sat in Your Lap"	3:29
2.	"James and the Cold Gun" (live, taken from the On Stage EP)	6:20
3.	"Ne t'enfuis pas" (only on Canadian version)	2:33

Side two
No.	Title	Length
1.	"Babooshka"	3:20
2.	"Suspended in Gaffa"	3:56
3.	"Un baiser d'enfant (French recording of The Infant Kiss)"	3:00
