= List of awards and nominations received by Kate Bush =

This is a list of music awards and award nominations received by the English singer/songwriter Kate Bush. To date Kate Bush has received 13 nominations for BRIT Awards throughout her career, but has so far won only once, in 1987.

== American Music Awards ==
The American Music Awards are given annually since 1973 to reward the most popular and successful musical releases of each year. Bush has been nominated once.

Year	Nominee / work	Award	Result
2022	"Running Up That Hill (A Deal with God)"	Favorite Rock Song	Nominated

== BMI London Awards ==
The Broadcast Music, Incorporated (BMI) Awards is an annual award show hosted for the purpose of giving awards to songwriters. Songwriters are selected each year from the entire BMI catalog, based on the number of performances during the award period.

Year	Nominee / work	Award	Result
2003	"This Woman's Work"	Pop Award	Won

== Billboard Music Awards ==
The Billboard Music Awards are held to honour artists for commercial performance in the U.S., based on record charts published by Billboard.

Year	Nominee / work	Award	Result
1985	Herself	Top Pop Singles Artist - Female	19th place
1986	Herself	Top Pop Albums Artist - Female	15th place
1987	Herself	Top Pop Albums Artist - Female	19th place

== Brit Awards ==
The Brit Awards are the British Phonographic Industry's (BPI) annual pop music awards. Bush has received one award from thirteen nominations.

Year	Nominee / work	Award	Result
1986	Herself	Best British Female	Nominated
1986	Hounds of Love	Best British Album	Nominated
1986	"Running Up That Hill"	Best British Single	Nominated
1987	Herself	Best British Female	Won
1988	Herself	Best British Female	Nominated
1990	Herself	Best British Female	Nominated
1990	Herself	Best British Producer	Nominated
1993	Herself	Best British Female	Nominated
1995	Herself	Best British Female	Nominated
2005	"Wuthering Heights"	Best Song of the Past 25 Years	Nominated
2006	Herself	Best British Female	Nominated
2006	Aerial	Best British Album	Nominated
2012	Herself	Best British Female	Nominated

== Classic Pop Readers' Awards ==
Classic Pop is a monthly British music magazine, which launched in October 2012. It was devised and founded by Ian Peel, who was also editor for the first 19 issues. Rik Flynn stepped in as editor until Issue 23 followed by current editor Steve Harnell. Ian Peel remains involved as Founder & Editor-at-Large.

Year	Nominee / work	Award	Result
2019	Remastered	Reissue of the Year	Nominated

== Edison Awards ==
The Edison music award is an annual Dutch music prize, awarded for outstanding achievements in the music industry. It is one of the oldest music awards in the world, having been presented since 1960.

Year	Nominee / work	Award	Result
1979	"Wuthering Heights"	Best International Single	Won

== Evening Standard Theatre Awards ==
The Evening Standard Theatre Awards, established in 1955, are presented annually for outstanding achievements in London Theatre. Sponsored by the Evening Standard newspaper, they are announced in late November or early December. They are the equivalent of the Broadway theatre Drama Desk Awards.

Year	Nominee / work	Award	Result
2014	Before the Dawn	Editor's Award	Won

== GAFFA Awards ==
=== Denmark GAFFA Awards ===
Delivered since 1991, the GAFFA Awards are a Danish award that rewards popular music by the magazine of the same name.

Year	Nominee / work	Award	Result	Ref.
2005	Herself	Best Foreign Female Act	Nominated	

== Groovevolt Music and Fashion Awards ==
Year	Nominee / work	Award	Result
2007	Aerial	Best Rock Album - Female	Nominated

== Grammy Awards ==
The Grammy Awards are awarded annually by The Recording Academy of the United States for outstanding achievements in the music industry. Often considered the highest music honour, the awards were established in 1958.

Year	Nominee / work	Award	Result
1988	The Whole Story	Best Concept Music Video	Nominated
1991	The Sensual World	Best Alternative Music Album	Nominated
1996	The Line, the Cross and the Curve	Best Music Film	Nominated
2025	Hounds of Love (Baskerville Edition)	Best Recording Package	Nominated
2025	Hounds of Love (The Boxes of Lost at Sea)	Best Boxed or Special Limited Edition Package	Nominated

== IM&MC Music Video Awards ==
Year	Nominee / work	Award	Result	Ref.
1986	"Cloudbusting"	Best Female Performance	Won	

== Ivor Novello Awards ==
The Ivor Novello Awards are awarded for songwriting and composing. The awards, named after the Cardiff born entertainer Ivor Novello, are presented annually in London by the British Academy of Songwriters, Composers and Authors (BASCA).

Year	Nominee / work	Award	Result
1979	"Wuthering Heights"	The Best Song Musically and Lyrically	Nominated
1979	"Wuthering Heights"	The Best Pop Song	Nominated
1979	"The Man with the Child in His Eyes"	The Outstanding British Lyric	Won
1981	"Babooshka"	The Best Song Musically and Lyrically	Nominated
1983	"The Dreaming"	The Outstanding British Lyric	Nominated
1986	"Running Up That Hill"	Best Contemporary Song	Nominated
2002	Herself	Outstanding Contribution to British Music	Won
2012	50 Words for Snow	Album Award	Nominated
2023	"Running Up That Hill"	PRS for Music Most Performed Work	Nominated

== MIDEM Video Awards ==
Year	Nominee / work	Award	Result
1980	"Babooshka"	Best International Performance	Won

== MOJO Awards ==
MOJO Awards are awarded by the popular British music magazine, Mojo, published monthly by Bauer.

Year	Nominee / work	Award	Result
2005	Herself	Songwriter Award	Nominated
2006	Herself	Songwriter Award	Nominated

== MTV Video Music Awards ==
The MTV Video Music Awards were established in the end of the summer of 1984 by MTV to celebrate the top music videos of the year.

Year	Nominee / work	Award	Result
1986	"Running Up That Hill"	Best Female Video	Nominated
1987	"The Big Sky"	Best Female Video	Nominated

== Music Week Awards ==
The Music Week Awards event is the biggest night in the UK music calendar and recognises outstanding contributions made to the music industry. The awards are voted for by an independent panel.

Year	Nominee / work	Award	Result
1987	The Whole Story	The Marketing Award	Nominated
2019	Herself	Catalogue Marketing Campaign	Nominated

== NME Awards ==
The NME Awards are an annual music awards show founded by the music magazine NME. Bush received one awards from three nominations.

Year	Nominee / work	Award	Result
1979	Herself	Best Female Singer	Won
2015	Herself	Hero of the Year	Nominated
2015	Kate Bush's return	Music Moment of the Year	Nominated

== Progressive Music Awards ==
Prog magazine was also behind the annual Progressive Music Awards that was established in 2012.

Year	Nominee / work	Award	Result
2012	Herself	Prog Goddess	Nominated
2015	Herself	Artist of the Year	Nominated
2015	Before the Dawn	Live Event of the Year	Nominated

== Q Awards ==
The Q Awards are the UK's annual music awards run by the music magazine Q to honor musical excellence. Winners are voted by readers of Q online, with others decided by a judging panel. Bush received one award from three nominations.

Year	Nominee / work	Award	Result
2001	Herself	Q Classic Songwriter Award	Won
2014	Herself	Best Act in the World Today	Nominated
2014	Herself	Best Live Act	Nominated

== Rober Awards Music Poll ==
Year	Nominee / work	Award	Result
2011	Herself	Best Female Artist	Won
2011	Herself	Return of the Year	Won
2014	Herself	Best Live Artist	Won
2016	Before the Dawn	Best Compilation	Nominated

== Rock and Roll Hall of Fame ==
The Rock and Roll Hall of Fame is a museum located on the shores of Lake Erie in downtown Cleveland, Ohio, United States, dedicated to the recording history of some of the best-known and most influential artists, producers, and other people who have influenced the music industry.

Year	Nominee / work	Award	Result
2018	Performer	Hall of Fame	Nominated
2021	Performer	Hall of Fame	Nominated
2022	Performer	Hall of Fame	Nominated
2023	Performer	Hall of Fame	Won

== Smash Hits Poll Winners Party ==
The Smash Hits Poll Winners Party was an awards ceremony held annually by British magazine Smash Hits, and broadcast on BBC One.

Year	Nominee / work	Award	Result
1980	Herself	Best Female Singer	Won
1980	Herself	Most Fanciable Female	Nominated
1981	Herself	Most Fanciable Female	Nominated
1981	Herself	Best Female Singer	Nominated
1982	Herself	Best Female Singer	Nominated

== Satellite Awards ==
The Satellite Awards are an annual award given by the International Press Academy. Bush has been nominated once.

Year	Nominee / work	Award	Result
2007	"Lyra"	Best Original Song	Nominated

== South Bank Sky Arts Awards ==
The South Bank Show is a television arts magazine show that was produced by ITV between 1978 and 2010, and by Sky Arts from 2012. Bush has won once.

Year	Nominee / work	Award	Result
2012	50 Words for Snow	Best Album	Won

== Variety Hitmakers ==
The Variety Hitmakers are given annually since 2017 to recognize the writers, producers, publishers, and other key personnel behind the scenes "who helped make―and break―the most consumed songs of the year as compiled by BuzzAngle Music". Bush was recognized the Sync of the Year at the 2022's ceremony.

Year	Nominee / work	Award	Result
2022	"Running Up That Hill (A Deal with God)"	Sync of the Year	Won

== Virgin Media Music Awards ==
The Virgin Media Music Awards was the annual music awards run by Virgin Media. The winners was declared on its official site "Virgin Media".

Year	Nominee / work	Award	Result
2005	Herself	Most Innovative Act	Won

== Žebřík Music Awards ==
Year	Nominee / work	Award	Result	Ref.
1994	Herself	Best International Female	Nominated	

=== 1979 ===
- BPI Awards
  - Best Female Singer
- Record Mirror Poll
  - Best New Artist, 1978
- Melody Maker Annual Poll Awards
  - Best Female Singer, 1979

=== 1980 ===
- BPI Awards
  - Best Female Singer
- Music Week annual awards
  - Top Female Artist, 1979
- Capital Radio Awards
  - Best Female Vocalist, 1979
- Record Mirror poll
  - Best Female Singer, 1979
- TV Times top ten awards
  - Most exciting TV female singer 1979

=== 1987 ===
- US College Music Awards
  - Best British Female Solo Artist
