= Kate Bush (disambiguation) =

Kate Bush is an English singer, songwriter, record producer and dancer.

The name may also refer to two records by Kate Bush:

- Kate Bush (album), a 1984 compilation album, released only in East Germany
- Kate Bush (EP), a 1983 five-song 12" EP, released in the USA
