= Aspects of the Sensual World =

EP by Kate Bush
- Released: 1990 (US and Canada only)
- Recorded: 1987–89
- Genre: Art rock
- Length: 19:09
- Label: Columbia (US); Capitol (Canada)
- Producer: Kate Bush

Kate Bush chronology
The Sensual World (1989)	Aspects of the Sensual World (1990)	This Woman's Work: Anthology 1978–1990 (1990)

Professional ratings
Review scores
Source	Rating
MusicHound Rock: The Essential Album Guide	3.5/5 stars
Spin Alternative Record Guide	5/10

Aspects of the Sensual World is an EP by the English singer-songwriter Kate Bush, released in 1990 in the US and Canadian market. The Sensual World had been released as a single in September 1989, while tracks 2 to 5 had previously been released as B-Sides in the UK and Europe in 1989.

== Track listing ==
All tracks are written by Kate Bush.

No.	Title	Length
1.	"The Sensual World" (album version)	3:57
2.	"Be Kind to My Mistakes"	3:03
3.	"I'm Still Waiting"	4:25
4.	"Ken"	3:48
5.	"The Sensual World" (Instrumental Mix)	3:56

== See also ==
- The Sensual World
- Kate Bush discography
