= Night of the Swallow =

1982 song by Kate Bush

Single by Kate Bush

from the album The Dreaming
- B-side: "Houdini"
- Released: 21 November 1983 (Ireland)
- Recorded: Spring–Summer 1981
- Genre: Irish folk
- Length: 5:34
- Label: EMI
- Songwriter: Kate Bush
- Producer: Kate Bush

Kate Bush singles chronology
"Ne t'enfuis pas" (1983)	"Night of the Swallow" (1983)	"Running Up That Hill" (1985)

Audio sample
- "Night of the Swallow": file; help

"Night of the Swallow" is a 1982 song by Kate Bush. Written and produced by Bush, it was included on the album The Dreaming. The song has an Irish theme and features many Irish musicians and instruments. It was released as a single in Ireland in November 1983, making it the fifth release from the album.

== Background ==
The lyrics concern a smuggler planning his next clandestine journey. Bush takes on the role of his lover, who begs him not to go ("I won't let you do it. If you go, I'll let the law know"). The song ends with the smuggler speaking in defiance ("Would you break even my wings, like a swallow. Let me, let me go"). Bush herself has commented on the lyrics, saying:

"In this song she wants to control him and because he wants to do something that she doesn't want him to she feels that he is going away. It's almost on a parallel with the mother and son relationship where there is the same female feeling of not wanting the young child to move away from the nest. Of course, from the guy's point of view, because she doesn't want him to go, the urge to go is even stronger. For him, it's not so much a job as a challenge; a chance to do something risky and exciting."

The track features many Irish musicians. These include members of Planxty and The Chieftains: Bill Whelan on bagpipes, Liam O'Flynn on uilleann pipes and penny whistle, Seán Keane on fiddle and Dónal Lunny on bouzouki. Whelan is credited as writing the string parts for the song, although this was in close association with Bush herself. Bush was to explore Irish themes in later works also, such as "Jig of Life" from Hounds of Love (1985) and the single "Rocket Man" (1991). Bush's mother was Irish and so Kate had listened to traditional Irish music from a young age and was eager to explore this style. Her brother Jay also influenced her due to his appreciation of the group Planxty.

The song was the first of two (the other being "Sat in Your Lap") to be recorded for the album. It was mainly recorded at Abbey Road Studios in Spring 1981 over several sessions. The Irish musicians section was recorded in Ireland, with Bush working there with them overnight. After completing the track at seven in the morning, she headed back to London to finish mixing the song. Bush spoke about the song (where its name was revealed) as early as July 1981, saying that Planxty were "Fantastic musicians with open, receptive minds, which is unusual for people who work with traditional folk music".

The track was finally released in September 1982 as the seventh track of The Dreaming. The single was released over a year after the album and failed to chart in Ireland. It also went unpromoted, with no music video made for the song.

The B-side of the single was another track from The Dreaming, "Houdini". This song is about the story of Bess Houdini and her attempts to communicate with her deceased husband Harry, using a plan they developed while he was still alive. The album cover of The Dreaming depicts a scene from this song and in particular the line; "with a kiss, I'll pass the key".

== Track listing ==
1. "Night of the Swallow" (Kate Bush) – 5:34
2. "Houdini" (Bush) – 3:49

== Personnel ==
- Kate Bush – vocals, Fairlight CMI
- Stuart Elliott – drums
- Del Palmer – fretless bass, 8-string bass
- Bill Whelan – bagpipes, string arrangement
- Liam O'Flynn – uilleann pipes, penny whistle
- Seán Keane – fiddle
- Dónal Lunny – bouzouki
