= Experiment IV =

Single by Kate Bush

from the album The Whole Story
- B-side: "Wuthering Heights" (new vocal); "December Will Be Magic Again"
- Released: 27 October 1986
- Genre: Art rock; progressive pop
- Length: 4:19 4:49 (Video Version) 4:55 (Best Of The Other Sides Version)
- Label: EMI
- Songwriter: Kate Bush
- Producer: Kate Bush

Kate Bush singles chronology
"Don't Give Up" (1986)	"Experiment IV" (1986)	"The Sensual World" (1989)

Music video
- "Experiment IV" on YouTube

"Experiment IV" is a song by the English singer Kate Bush. It was released as a single on 27 October 1986 to promote Bush's greatest hits album The Whole Story. The single peaked at No. 23 and spent four weeks in the UK Singles Chart.

The single charted simultaneously with "Don't Give Up", Bush's duet with Peter Gabriel, which peaked at No. 9 in the UK Singles Chart.

== Overview ==
The song tells a story about a secret military plan to create a sound that is horrific enough to kill people. The story's ending is unclear, but in the music video nearly every person working on the project is killed by the horrific sound, which is personified by Bush herself as she changes from an angelic apparition into a horrific flying monster.

The song features Nigel Kennedy on violin, who at one point replicates the screeching violins from Bernard Herrmann's famous scoring of the shower scene in Alfred Hitchcock's 1960 film Psycho.

The B-sides of both the 7" and 12" singles included a reworking of Bush's 1978 hit "Wuthering Heights". The 12" single and cassingle included the 1980 song "December Will Be Magic Again" as an additional B-side track.

An extended version of "Experiment IV" appeared on the 12" vinyl release of the single. Both versions of the song were included in the second volume of rarities in the box set This Woman's Work, released in 1990. A slightly longer version, known as the "Video Mix" appears on 2019's The Other Sides. A remix, combining elements of the 12" and the single version, was released on streaming platforms in 2025, as part of the compilation Best Of The Other Sides.

== Music video ==
The music video adapts the song's "storyline" by chronicling the destruction of a secret military installation by a creature made of sound. The science fiction film-in-miniature was directed by Bush and features appearances from Dawn French, Hugh Laurie, Richard Vernon, Peter Vaughan, Paddy Bush and Del Palmer. Bush appears on screen as an orderly officer serving tea, as the sound creature and at the end entering a van. British costume designer Charles Knode made the masks of the sound creature and most of the video was shot in a disused military hospital in southeast London.

In a 1987 interview for The Kate Bush Club, Bush recounted her experience of directing the video, "I had such strong visual ideas while I was writing the song that I wanted to give directing another go. It's the first time the video and song have come together. Although this was the most complicated of my directions, it was so much easier for me because I appeared in it only briefly, so I could concentrate on being behind the camera which I really enjoy. It was wonderful to work with people who I admire so much and was a very exciting experience."

Before the editing of the full video could be completed, a minute-long segment was created for Top of the Pops, but the show refused to play it as they considered it to be "too violent". Channel 4's The Tube aired the video in its entirety and it was also shown in cinemas as an accompaniment to a feature film.

== Critical reception ==
Upon its release, William Leith of NME described "Experiment IV" as a "slow, creeping song" and a "mood piece" which is "more reserved and wintry" than "Hounds of Love". Mark Putterford of Kerrang! wrote, "Chilling, moody, beautiful... you know the kind of magical musical spell our Kate can weave, and even if you haven't been mesmerised by her yet there's every chance that this one will do the trick." Jerry Smith of Music Week called it "dramatic" and "excellently produced". Roger Morton of Record Mirror noted that Bush "sets [her] vision of a future where music is used as a weapon of destruction to another one of those nudging, understated melodies". He added, "This one's all gliding guitars and whispered warbling, fading into throbbing Apocalypse Now chopper blades." Edwin Pouncey of Sounds praised the "chilly fantasy" as "an epic to curl up with on some storm torn winter's evening". He added that Bush "crams more into seven inches of plastic than most science fiction writers could fit into a trilogy of novels".

== Track listing ==
All songs written by Kate Bush.

7" single (UK)

No.	Title	Length
1.	"Experiment IV"	4:21
2.	"Wuthering Heights" (new vocal)	4:56

12" single (UK)

No.	Title	Length
1.	"Experiment IV" (12" mix)	6:38
2.	"Wuthering Heights" (new vocal)	4:56
3.	"December Will Be Magic Again"	4:50

== Charts ==
Chart (1986)	Peak position
Europe (European Top 100 Singles)	66
Finland (Suomen virallinen lista)	21
German Singles Chart	50
Irish Singles Chart	12
Luxembourg (Radio Luxembourg)	16
UK Singles Chart	23

In Australia, "Experiment IV" narrowly missed the Kent Music Report top 100 singles chart in December 1986.
