= Ne t'enfuis pas =

Song written and composed by Kate Bush

Single by Kate Bush
- B-side: "Un baiser d'enfant"
- Released: July 1983
- Recorded: 16 October 1982
- Studio: Bush's home (Eltham)
- Genre: Art pop
- Length: 2:30
- Label: EMI
- Songwriter(s): Kate Bush; Patrick Jeaneau, Vivienne Chandler (French lyrics)
- Producer(s): Kate Bush

Kate Bush singles chronology
"Suspended in Gaffa" (1982)	"Ne t'enfuis pas" (1983)	"Night of the Swallow" (1983)

"Ne t'enfuis pas" is a song written and recorded by the English singer-songwriter Kate Bush. An entirely French-language track, it was released in July 1983 in France and Canada. The song was originally released as the B-side of the singles "There Goes a Tenner" in the UK and Ireland, and "Suspended in Gaffa" in continental Europe. On those singles, the title was misspelled as "Ne T'en Fui Pas".

"Ne t'enfuis pas" tells the story of a woman, worried that her lover is about to leave, wrestling with her conscience over her plans to make him stay.

The B-side, "Un baiser d'enfant", is a French-language version of "The Infant Kiss", from Bush's album Never for Ever. Based on the movie The Innocents, it is the story of a governess who is frightened by the adult feelings she has for her young male charge (who is possessed by the spirit of a grown man).

The A-side is a remix. The vocals are cleaner and more forward than on the version that was released in late 1982. Additionally, the spelling was corrected. This version was eventually included on the This Woman's Work: Anthology 1978–1990 box set in 1990.

In French "Ne t'enfuis pas" literally translates to "Don't run away", though it can also mean "Don't flee". Translations in official Kate Bush lyric books have rendered the title as "Don't Fly Away", with the lyrics mentioning wings and falling from the sky.

The single was re-released in the UK on 8 November 2019, exclusively on 12″ vinyl. The artwork used the same photo of Bush from 1983, but now with a white border and the titles in mock-typeface font, similar to that used in the remastered album boxed sets in 2018.

== Critical reception ==
Paul Wiffen of Electronics & Music Maker said the song's breathy singing reminds of "Je t'aime... moi non plus" by Serge Gainsbourg and Jane Birkin. Denis Argent of Hi-Fi News & Record Review described it "represent[s] the acceptable face of pop".

== Personnel ==
- Kate Bush – Fairlight, vocals
- Del Palmer – Linn programming, fretless bass
- Paul Hardiman – engineer

== Charts ==
Chart (2019)	Peak position
UK Physical Singles	1
UK Vinyl Singles	1
