= The Dreaming (album) =

Studio album by Kate Bush
- Released: 13 September 1982
- Recorded: September 1980 – May 1982
- Studios: Advision, Odyssey, Abbey Road and Townhouse, (all) London
- Genres: Art rock; avant-pop; progressive pop; progressive rock
- Length: 43:25
- Label: EMI
- Producer: Kate Bush

Kate Bush chronology
| Never for Ever (1980) | The Dreaming (1982) | Kate Bush (1983) |

Singles from The Dreaming
- 1. "Sat in Your Lap" Released: 29 June 1981; 2. "The Dreaming" Released: 26 July 1982; 3. "There Goes a Tenner" Released: 1 November 1982 (Note: Released in the UK and Ireland); 4. "Suspended in Gaffa" Released: 1 November 1982 (Note: Released in EU and Australia); 5. "Night of the Swallow" Released: 21 November 1983 (Note: Released in Ireland exclusively)

The Dreaming is the fourth studio album by the English singer-songwriter Kate Bush, released on 13 September 1982 by EMI Records. Recorded over two years, the album was produced entirely by Bush and is often characterised as her most uncommercial and experimental release.

The Dreaming peaked at No. 3 on the UK album chart and has been certified Silver by the BPI. It initially sold less than its predecessors and was met with mixed critical reception. Five singles from the album were released, including the UK No. 11 "Sat in Your Lap" and the title track, "The Dreaming".

The critical standing of the album has improved significantly in recent decades. A public poll conducted by NPR ranked The Dreaming as the 24th greatest album ever made by a female artist. Slant Magazine listed the album at No. 71 on its list of "Best Albums of the 1980s". It is also included in the book 1001 Albums You Must Hear Before You Die, the Mojo "Top 50 Eccentric Albums of All Time" list, and The Word's "Great Underrated Albums of Our Time" list. Musicians such as Björk, Steven Wilson of Porcupine Tree, and Big Boi of Outkast have cited The Dreaming as one of their favourite albums.

== Recording and composition ==
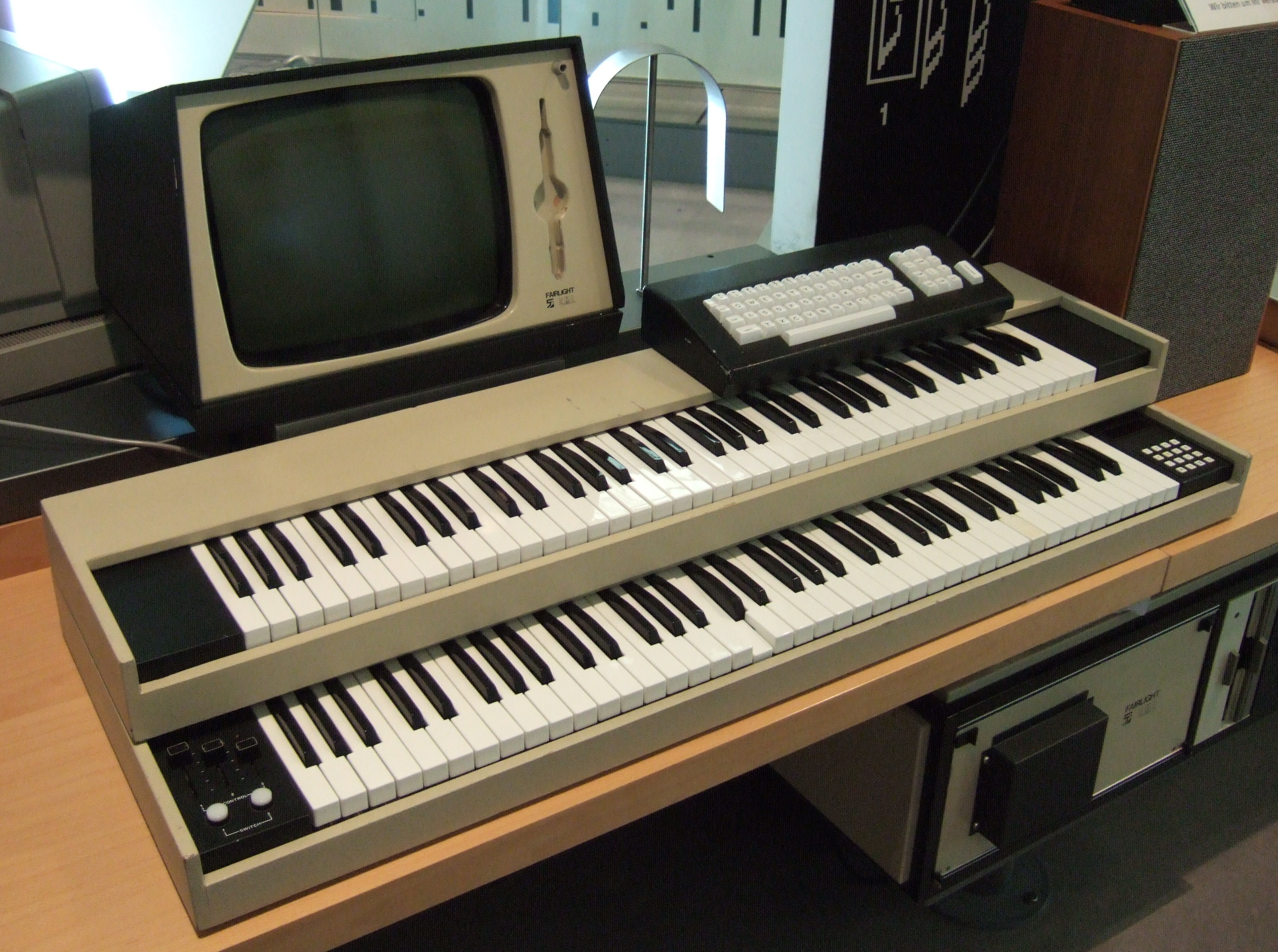
Bush played the Fairlight CMI for this album.

Bush's third album Never for Ever had been a co-production between her and Jon Kelly. For her fourth album, she elected to produce the work entirely herself. With her newfound freedom, Bush experimented with production techniques, employing a diverse blend of musical styles. She made extensive use of the Fairlight CMI digital sampling synthesizer, which she had first used on Never for Ever. She also collaborated with a variety of engineers, including Nick Launay, who had previously worked with artists such as Public Image Ltd and Phil Collins. Recording began around the release of Never for Ever, with the first demo for "Sat in Your Lap" being laid down in September 1980, inspired after Bush attended a Stevie Wonder concert.

Originally, Bush wanted Hugh Padgham to work with her as an engineer on the album, having been impressed with his work on Peter Gabriel's eponymous third album. Due to Padgham's busy schedule at the time — he was doing final work on Genesis' Abacab and was yet to co-produce with the Police on Ghost in the Machine — he was only able to work with her for a few weeks, engineering just the backing tracks for "Sat in Your Lap", "Leave It Open" and "Get Out of My House". Launay therefore took over for the Townhouse sessions.

According to critic Simon Reynolds, "armed with the Fairlight and other state-of-the-art machines, Bush pushed her existing maximalist tendencies to the brink of overload." In June 1981, the first single was released, "Sat in Your Lap", which peaked at No.11 in the UK, but the rest of the album was slow to develop, with Bush saying she suffered from writer's block. Over the summer of 1981, Bush worked on the album at Abbey Road Studios and Odyssey Studios as well as working with Irish folk bands Planxty and the Chieftains in Dublin. After long days in the studio, Bush decided to take a break from the album in the latter part of 1981 and resumed work in the early months of 1982 – laying overdubs and other final touches throughout the period January to May 1982 at Advision Studios.

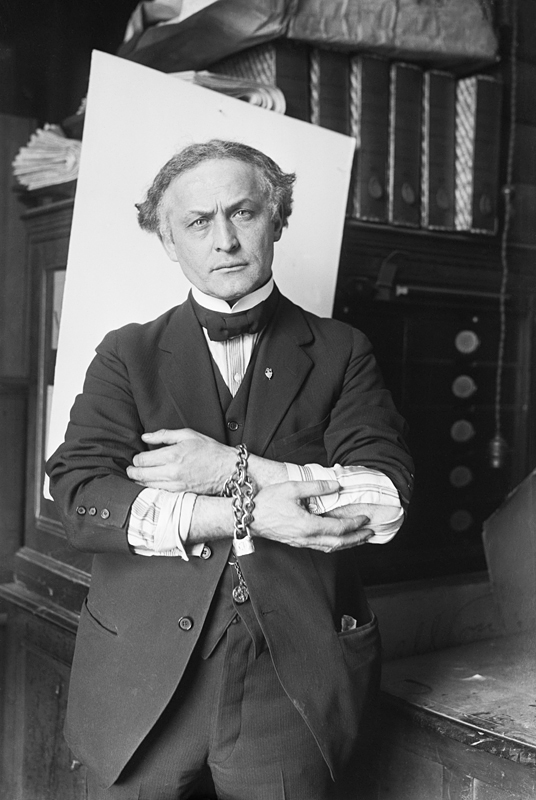
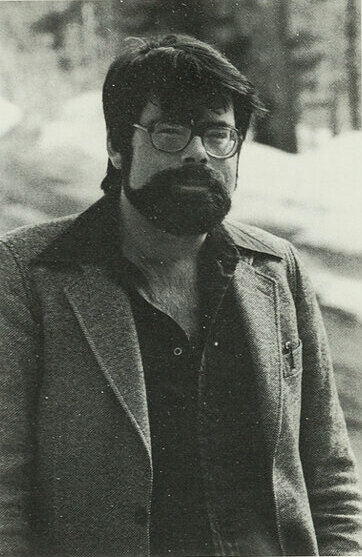
Escape artist Harry Houdini (left) and The Shining (author Stephen King pictured right) were among Bush's inspirations for the songs' subjects.

The Dreaming has been characterised as an experimental release. The album employs folk instruments such as mandolins, uilleann pipes, and didgeridoos, shifting time signatures and textures, polyrhythmic percussion, samples and vocal loops. Its songs draw inspiration from a variety of sources, including old crime films ("There Goes a Tenner"), a documentary about the war in Vietnam ("Pull Out the Pin"), the plight of Indigenous Australians ("The Dreaming"), the life of Harry Houdini ("Houdini") and Stephen King's novel The Shining ("Get Out of My House"). Other tracks explore more personal issues; "Sat in Your Lap" examines feelings of existential frustration and the search for knowledge, while "Leave It Open" speaks of the need to acknowledge and express the darker sides of one's personality. The Quietus suggested that "The Dreaming's disparate narratives frequently seem to be tropes for Bush's quest for artistic autonomy and the anxieties that accompany it." Daphne Carr of Pitchfork described its sound as more similar to experimental post-punk bands such as Siouxsie and the Banshees and Public Image Ltd in comparison to her previous works.

== Release and commercial performance ==
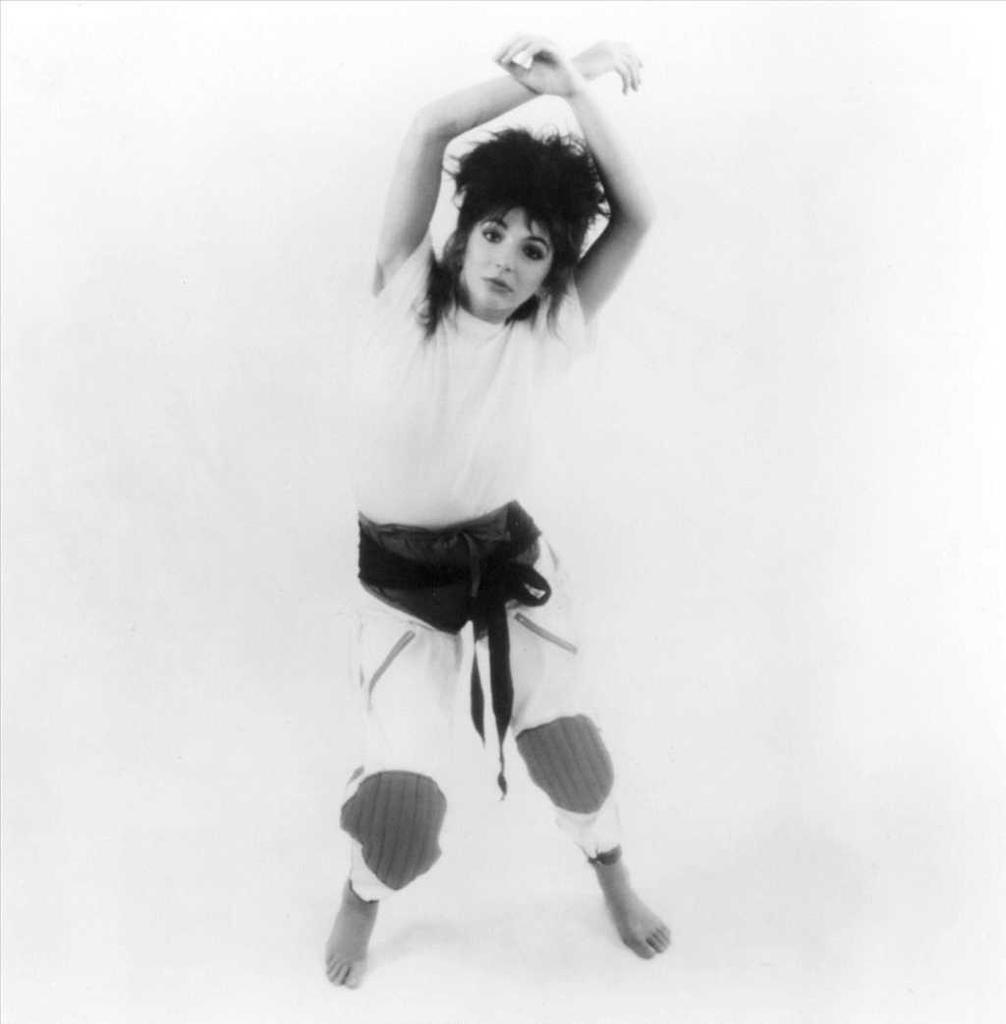
Bush in 1982

The album was released on 13 September 1982. The album peaked at No. 3 in the UK. It however remained on the chart for only 10 weeks, making this Bush's lowest-selling album, being certified just silver.

"The main thing I heard was 'uncommercial'... the label that the press, the record company put on it. But for an uncommercial record to go straight in at No.3 in the charts seems ironic to me."

— Kate Bush (1984)

In November the next (and final UK release) single, "There Goes a Tenner", was released in the UK. It is Bush's only single not to enter the UK top 75. In Europe, "Suspended in Gaffa" was released instead, which performed better chartwise. Belatedly, another single, "Night of the Swallow" was released in Ireland in November 1983.

Despite the album's relatively lacklustre sales elsewhere, The Dreaming was Bush's first album to dent the US Billboard Top 200, largely due to the growing influence of college radio and MTV. Following this, an EP was released in 1983, which also charted. In 1984, her second and third albums (Lionheart, and Never for Ever, respectively) were belatedly released in the US.

With the lengthy and expensive studio time used to complete the album, EMI Records were concerned at the relatively low yield of the album. Following this, Bush decided to build her own studio where she could be free to spend as much time as she liked. Although her next album, Hounds of Love (1985), was another long-gestating project, it returned Bush to the top of the charts.

The album cover depicts a scene described in the lyrics to the song "Houdini". In the picture shown, Bush (wearing a houndstooth jacket/coat) is acting as Harry Houdini's wife Bess, holding a key in her mouth, which she is about to pass on to him. The photograph is rendered in sepia, with just the gold key and Bush's eye make-up showing any colour. The man with her on the cover photograph was her bass player, engineer and then-partner Del Palmer. In 2023, Joe Lynch of Billboard ranked it the 96th best album cover of all time.

In November 2018, Bush released box sets of remasters of her studio albums, including The Dreaming.

== Critical reception ==
Professional ratings
Review scores
| Source | Rating |
|---|---|
| AllMusic | 3.5/5 stars |
| Encyclopedia of Popular Music | 4/5 stars |
| The Great Rock Discography | 6/10 |
| Mojo | 5/5 stars |
| MusicHound Rock | 3.5/5 stars |
| Pitchfork | 7.7/10 |
| The Rolling Stone Album Guide | 3/5 stars |
| Smash Hits | 8/10 |
| Spin Alternative Record Guide | 9/10 |
| The Village Voice | B+ |

=== Initial response ===
Upon its release, The Dreaming met with a mixed critical reception. Many were baffled by the unconventional techniques and dense soundscapes Bush had employed. Writing for Smash Hits, Neil Tennant described the album as "very weird. She's obviously trying to become less commercial." Colin Irwin of Melody Maker wrote that "initially it is bewildering and not a little preposterous, but try to hang on through the twisted overkill and the histrionic fits and there's much reward." He labelled "Suspended in Gaffa" the only "vaguely conventional track" and identified "Night of the Swallow" as a song that demonstrated her "growing maturity as a writer and her arrival as an outstanding producer." Irwin further predicted that the British audiences would struggle to connect with the material and believed that the album would likely be commercially unsuccessful.

Cashbox called the album "an imaginative array of avant garde experimental fare coated with a pop sensibility." Billboard said that the album was "disjointed, quirky, startling, often nonsensical, but always fascinating." American critic Robert Christgau wrote that "the revelation is the dense, demanding music", calling it "the most impressive Fripp/Gabriel-style art-rock album of the postpunk refulgence." Jon Young of Trouser Press called it "a triumph of inventive songwriting and unpredictable performances" but warned that "its sensory overload will drive away the less than dedicated."

== Legacy ==
In a later review, AllMusic called it "a theatrical and abstract piece of work", as well as "a brilliant predecessor to the charming beauty of 1985's Hounds of Love." The Quietus called it "a brave volte face from a mainstream artist" and "a startlingly modern record too", noting its "organic hybridization, the use of digital and analogue techniques, its use of modern wizardry to access atavistic states." In 2014, Simon Reynolds called The Dreaming a "wholly unfettered mistress-piece" and "a delirious, head-spinning experience". Bush herself called The Dreaming her "she's gone mad album" and said it was not particularly commercial. On later revisiting the album she said she was surprised by the sound, saying that it was quite an angry record. Uncut said that it was a "multi-layered, polyrhythmic and wildly experimental album [and] remains a landmark work". In 2018 The Guardian's chief critic Alexis Petridis wrote, "The Dreaming isn't Kate Bush's best album, but it remains my favourite; there's something very beguiling about the sound of an artist finally letting their imagination fully run riot. Not that Kate Bush's imagination was ever terribly constrained, but The Dreaming is marked by the sense that sampling technology had now enabled her to fully recreate the sounds in her head, and that she was now successful enough to please no-one other than herself."

In the 2010s, Björk and Big Boi cited The Dreaming as one of their favourite albums. Steven Wilson also stated that the album is one of his favourites and that his 2015 album, Hand. Cannot. Erase., was musically influenced by it. Commenting on its initial reception and legacy, Stylus Magazine critic Mike Orne wrote in 2007: "The Dreaming had an almost frantic luxuriousness. Charged with music-hall energy, the album's genre-hopping scared all but the most ardent supporters. While it's her worst-selling album, a number of fans regard it as her creative peak."

== Track listing ==
All tracks written, arranged and produced by Kate Bush, except pipes and strings arrangements on "Night of the Swallow" arranged by Bill Whelan, and strings arrangements on "Houdini" by Dave Lawson and Andrew Powell.

Side one
| No. | Title | Length |
|---|---|---|
| 1. | "Sat in Your Lap" | 3:29 |
| 2. | "There Goes a Tenner" | 3:24 |
| 3. | "Pull Out the Pin" | 5:26 |
| 4. | "Suspended in Gaffa" | 3:54 |
| 5. | "Leave It Open" | 3:20 |

Side two
| No. | Title | Length |
|---|---|---|
| 6. | "The Dreaming" | 4:41 |
| 7. | "Night of the Swallow" | 5:22 |
| 8. | "All the Love" | 4:29 |
| 9. | "Houdini" | 3:48 |
| 10. | "Get Out of My House" | 5:25 |
| Total length: | | 43:25 |

== Personnel ==
Credits are adapted from The Dreaming liner notes.

- Kate Bush – vocals, piano, Fairlight CMI synthesizer (1, 2, 5–10), Yamaha CS-80 (2), strings (4)
- Paddy Bush – sticks (1), mandolins and strings (4), bullroarer (6)
- Geoff Downes – Fairlight CMI trumpet section (1)
- Jimmy Bain – bass guitar (1, 5, 10)
- Del Palmer – bass guitar (2, 4, 8), fretless and 8 string bass (7)
- Preston Heyman – drums (1, 3, 5, 10), sticks (1)
- Stuart Elliott – drums (2, 4, 6–9), sticks (4), percussion (8)
- Dave Lawson – Synclavier (2, 4)
- Brian Bath – electric guitar (3)
- Danny Thompson – string bass (3)
- Ian Bairnson – acoustic guitar (5)
- Alan Murphy – electric guitar (5, 10)
- Rolf Harris - didgeridoo (6)
- Liam O'Flynn – penny whistle and uilleann pipes (7)
- Seán Keane – fiddle (7)
- Dónal Lunny – bouzouki (7)
- Eberhard Weber – double bass (9)

Other voices

- Paddy Bush, Ian Bairnson, Stewart Arnold and Gary Hurst – backing vocals (1)
- Paddy Bush – backing vocals (6, 10)
- David Gilmour – backing vocals (3)
- Percy Edwards – animals (6)
- Gosfield Goers – crowd (6)
- Richard Thornton – choirboy (8)
- Gordon Farrell – "Houdini" (9)
- Del Palmer – "Rosabel Believe" (9)
- Paul Hardiman – "Eeyore" (10)
- Esmail Sheikh – drum talk (10)

Technical

- Kate Bush – producer
- Paul Hardiman – recording engineer at Advision and Odyssey Studios, all mixes at Advision Studios
- Teri Reed, David Taylor – assistant engineers
- David Taylor – mixing assistant
- Haydn Bendall – engineer at Abbey Road Studios
- Danny Dawson and John Barrett – assistant engineers
- Hugh Padgham and Nick Launay – engineer at Townhouse Studios
- George Chambers, Howard Gray and Nick Cook – assistant engineers
- Peter Wooliscroft – digital editing
- Ian Cooper – mastering engineer

== Charts ==
=== Weekly charts ===
Initial weekly chart performance for The Dreaming
| Chart (1982) | Peak position |
|---|---|
| Australian Albums (Kent Music Report) | 22 |
| Canada Top Albums/CDs (RPM) | 29 |
| Dutch Albums (Album Top 100) | 5 |
| German Albums (Offizielle Top 100) | 23 |
| Japanese Albums (Oricon) | 36 |
| Norwegian Albums (VG-lista) | 12 |
| Swedish Albums (Sverigetopplistan) | 45 |
| UK Albums (Official Charts) | 3 |
| US Billboard 200 | 157 |

2014 weekly chart performance for The Dreaming
| Chart (2014) | Peak position |
|---|---|
| Scottish Albums (Official Charts) | 52 |
| UK Albums (Official Charts) | 37 |
| UK Independent Albums (Official Charts) | 11 |

2019 weekly chart performance for The Dreaming
| Chart (2019) | Peak position |
|---|---|
| UK Vinyl Albums | 28 |

=== Year-end charts ===
Year-end chart performance for The Dreaming
| Chart (1982) | Position |
|---|---|
| Dutch Albums (Album Top 100) | 77 |
| French Albums (IFOP) | 72 |
| UK Albums (OCC) | 93 |

== Certifications and sales ==
| Region | Certification | Certified units/sales |
|---|---|---|
| Japan (Oricon Charts) | — | 16,850 |
| United Kingdom (BPI) | Silver | 60,000^{^} |
| United States | — | 42,000 |
^{^} Shipments figures based on certification alone.

== See also ==
- Kate Bush discography
- List of awards and nominations received by Kate Bush
- List of 1980s albums considered the best
- Songline – Aboriginal Australian belief and practice
