= Suspended in Gaffa =

1982 song by Kate Bush

- German 7" single cover

Single by Kate Bush

from the album The Dreaming
- B-side: "Ne t'enfuis pas"
- Released: 1 November 1982; 17 January 1983 (Australia)
- Recorded: 1982
- Genre: Baroque pop; progressive pop; waltz
- Length: 3:50
- Label: EMI
- Songwriter: Kate Bush
- Producer: Kate Bush

Kate Bush singles chronology
"There Goes a Tenner" (1982)	"Suspended in Gaffa" (1982)	"Ne t'enfuis pas" (1983)

Music video
- "Suspended in Gaffa" on YouTube

"Suspended in Gaffa" is a song recorded by the English art rock singer Kate Bush. It was released as the fourth single from her fourth studio album The Dreaming (1982). "Suspended in Gaffa" was released as a single in continental Europe and Australia, but not in the UK.

The song lyrics are about seeing something one really wants (God in this case), then not being able to see or experience it ever again. The "gaffa" of the title and chorus refers to gaffer tape, the strong matte black tape used by technicians in the film and concert industries.

The B-side is the original mix of "Ne t'enfuis pas", which is misspelled on the sleeve as "Ne T'en Fui Pas". In some countries, the B-side was "Dreamtime" (which originally appeared as the B-side to "The Dreaming").

A music video for the song was produced. It features Bush performing an interpretive dance in a barn.

== Personnel ==
- Kate Bush – vocals, piano, strings
- Del Palmer – bass guitar
- Stuart Elliott – drums, sticks
- Paddy Bush – mandolin, strings
- Dave Lawson – synclavier

== Charts ==
Chart (1983)	Peak position
France (SNEP)	33
Netherlands (MegaCharts)	50
Spain (AFYVE)	38

== Covers ==
A cover of "Suspended in Gaffa" appears on Syracuse-based indie rock band Ra Ra Riot's debut album The Rhumb Line.

The song was also covered by garage rock band The Figgs on their 2019 album Shady Grove.

== In popular culture ==
Rec.music.gaffa has been the name for the Kate Bush Usenet newsgroup since 16 August 1985, and is now resident at Google Groups and other Kate-Bush-related websites.

"Kate Boosh" by Brooklyn-based rapper Himanshu "Heems" Suri samples the two-line post-chorus vocal of this song and co-opts it as a chorus. The song appears on Suri's 2012 mixtape Nehru Jackets.
