= December Will Be Magic Again =

Single by Kate Bush
- B-side: "Warm and Soothing"
- Released: 17 November 1980
- Recorded: 1979, 1980
- Genre: Christmas; art rock
- Length: 4:51
- Label: EMI
- Songwriter: Kate Bush
- Producers: Kate Bush, Jon Kelly

Kate Bush singles chronology
| "Army Dreamers" (1980) | "December Will Be Magic Again" (1980) | "Sat in Your Lap" (1981) |

"December Will Be Magic Again" is a festive-themed song by English singer-songwriter Kate Bush. It was released as a single in the UK in November 1980. The single peaked at No. 29 in the UK and spent seven weeks on the chart.

== Lyrics ==
The lyrics include mention of Bing Crosby singing "White Christmas"; and refer to Oscar Wilde.

== Song release ==
"December Will Be Magic Again" was written and originally recorded in 1979 at Abbey Road Studio 2 London with Preston Heyman on drums, sleigh bells and maracas, Alan Murphy on guitar, Kuma Harada on bass and Bush on piano, but not released until 17 November 1980. The single peaked at number 29 on the UK Singles Chart, but due to its early release date had slipped before the Christmas week. No promotional video was filmed for this single, but an alternative recording of the song was performed on Bush's 1979 Christmas television special. In addition to the version on the single release, another very different cut exists (on CD) with congas played by Tour of Life drummer Preston Heyman and slide whistles on the rhythm track. Neither has appeared on a Kate Bush album, except for the This Woman's Work box set, but both have found their way on to various Christmas compilations.

The B-side is "Warm and Soothing", a simple piece of Bush singing with just her piano accompaniment. This was the first song she recorded at Abbey Road Studios.

Initial pressings of the 7" single have "Cut by Chris Blair", "Songs & arrangements by Kate Bush", and "Cover by Nick Price" centered on the rear sleeve. Reissues have these acknowledgements spread out across the bottom. Originals also have "Happy Christmas" etched into the dead wax on Side A. The song was featured on the 12" single of "Experiment IV" and later on the second of two CD editions of the "Moments of Pleasure" single in 1993 and had a slightly different mix. In 2005 the song was included on Elton John's Christmas album, Elton John's Christmas Party.

== Critical reception ==
Andy Gill of NME wrote: "Looks like we'll have to endure that fairy Kate Bush". In 1990, Stuart Maconie deemed the song "one of the neatest Christmas tunes since Spector" in his This Woman's Work box set review. Ronnie Gurr of Smash Hits described "novel with her optimistic December operetta".

== Charts ==
| Chart (1980) | Peak position |
|---|---|
| Ireland (IRMA) | 13 |
| Luxembourg (Radio Luxembourg) | 17 |
| UK Singles (OCC) | 29 |
| West Germany (GfK) | 55 |
