= Love and Anger (song) =

1990 single by Kate Bush

Single by Kate Bush

from the album The Sensual World
- B-side: "Ken"; "The Confrontation"; "One Last Look Around the House Before We Go..."
- Released: 26 February 1990
- Genre: Art rock; Gaelic rock
- Length: 4:41
- Label: EMI
- Songwriter: Kate Bush
- Producer: Kate Bush

Kate Bush singles chronology
"This Woman's Work" (1989)	"Love and Anger" (1990)	"Rocket Man (I Think It's Going to Be a Long, Long Time)" (1991)

Music video
- "Love and Anger" on YouTube

"Love and Anger" is a song written and performed by British singer Kate Bush. It was released as the third and final single from her sixth studio album, The Sensual World (1989), on 26 February 1990 in the United Kingdom, peaking at No. 38 on the UK Singles Chart. In the United States, it received airplay in 1989 and reached No. 1 on the US Billboard Modern Rock Tracks chart that December—it was Bush's only chart-topper on any US chart until 2022. The song features Pink Floyd member David Gilmour on guitar. "Love and Anger" was Bush's first single on her new US label, Columbia Records.

== B-sides ==
The B-sides on the single are "Ken", "One Last Look Around the House Before We Go" and "The Confrontation", the latter two of which are instrumentals and are only available on the CD release and 12-inch version of this single. All three songs were written for the episode GLC: The Carnage Continues... of the British TV program The Comic Strip. "Ken" was the theme music for the episode's parody of a Hollywood action movie about British politician Ken Livingstone, whom Bush describes in the song as a "funky sex machine".

== Music video ==
The video for "Love and Anger" was directed by Bush.

== Track listings ==
7-inch and cassette single
No.	Title	Length
1.	"Love and Anger"	4:37
2.	"Ken" (from The Comic Strip film "GLC")	3:48

12-inch and CD single
No.	Title	Length
1.	"Love and Anger"	4:41
2.	"Ken" (from The Comic Strip film "GLC")	3:48
3.	"The Confrontation"	2:56
4.	"One Last Look Around the House Before We Go..."	1:00

US cassette single
No.	Title	Length
1.	"Love and Anger"
2.	"Walk Straight Down the Middle"

Canadian cassette single
No.	Title	Length
1.	"Love and Anger"
2.	"Be Kind to My Mistakes"

== Personnel ==
Personnel are lifted from The Sensual World album booklet.

- Kate Bush – writing, lead and backing vocals, piano, keyboards, production
- Paddy Bush – backing vocals, valiha
- Dave Gilmour – guitar
- John Giblin – bass
- Stuart Elliott – drums
- Del Palmer – Fairlight percussion programming, recording
- Paul Gomersall – additional recording
- Kevin Killen – additional recording, mixing
- Haydn Bendall – additional recording

== Charts ==
=== Weekly charts ===
Chart (1989–1990)	Peak position
Australia (ARIA)	145
Europe (Eurochart Hot 100)	99
UK Singles (OCC)	38
US Alternative Airplay (Billboard)	1

=== Year-end charts ===
Chart (1990)	Position
US Modern Rock Tracks (Billboard)	9

== Release history ==
Region	Date	Format(s)	Label(s)	Ref.
United Kingdom	26 February 1990	7-inch vinyl; 12-inch vinyl; CD; cassette	EMI	
Australia	21 May 1990	7-inch vinyl; 12-inch vinyl; cassette	EMI	

== See also ==
- List of Billboard number-one alternative singles of the 1980s
