= The Sensual World (song) =

1989 single by Kate Bush

Single by Kate Bush

from the album The Sensual World
- B-side: "Walk Straight Down the Middle"; "The Sensual World" (instrumental)
- Released: 18 September 1989
- Genre: Art rock
- Length: 3:57
- Label: EMI
- Songwriter: Kate Bush
- Producer: Kate Bush

Kate Bush singles chronology
"Experiment IV" (1986)	"The Sensual World" (1989)	"This Woman's Work" (1989)

Music video
- "The Sensual World" on YouTube

"Flower of the Mountain"

Song by Kate Bush

from the album Director's Cut
- Released: 16 May 2011
- Genre: Art rock
- Length: 5:15
- Label: Fish People; EMI
- Songwriters: Kate Bush; James Joyce
- Producer: Kate Bush

Audio video
- "Flower of the Mountain" on YouTube

"The Sensual World" is a song by English singer-songwriter Kate Bush. It was the title track and first single from her album of the same name, released in September 1989. The single entered and peaked at No. 12 on the UK Single Chart.

The B-side to the original single was "Walk Straight Down the Middle", a bonus track on the CD and cassette editions of The Sensual World album. The 12-inch vinyl release of the single had a double-grooved A-side so that either the song or an instrumental version of the song would be played depending on where the needle was placed.

Kate Bush later re-recorded the track using words taken from Molly Bloom's soliloquy from James Joyce's 1922 novel Ulysses. Using Joyce's text had been Bush's original intention whilst recording The Sensual World album. This version, re-titled "Flower of the Mountain", appears on the 2011 album Director's Cut.

== Writing and inspiration ==
The song is inspired by Molly Bloom stepping out of the black and white, two-dimensional pages of James Joyce's Ulysses into the real world, and is immediately struck by the sensuality of it all. It was originally intended to be Molly Bloom's speech (from the end of Ulysses) set to music, but Bush could not secure the rights from the Joyce estate, so she altered it. In 2011, the Joyce estate granted licence to the material, and Bush rerecorded the song as "Flower of the Mountain", released on 2011's Director's Cut.

Musically, one of the main hooks in the chorus of "The Sensual World" was inspired by a traditional Macedonian piece of music called "Antice, džanam, dušice" ("Антице, џанам, душице"). As in the traditional version, the melody is played on bagpipes, in this case uilleann pipes played by Irish musician Davy Spillane.

== Critical reception ==
David Giles from Music Week wrote, "A dazzling return to form after a few slightly indifferent releases, finds Bush in lustful mood. Church bells herald a mellow, dreamy song with the accompaniment of an Arabic woodwind instrument. Easily the best song she's written since 'Army Dreamers', even if it is slightly on the long side."

== Music video ==
The accompanying video for "The Sensual World", which features Bush dancing through an enchanted forest in a medieval dress, was co-directed by The Comic Strip co-creator Peter Richardson and Bush herself.

== Track listings ==
All songs written by Kate Bush.

7-inch, cassette, and Japanese mini-CD single
No.	Title	Length
1.	"The Sensual World"	3:56
2.	"Walk Straight Down the Middle"	3:48

12-inch, CD, and German mini maxi-CD single
No.	Title	Length
1.	"The Sensual World"	3:56
2.	"The Sensual World" (Instrumental Version)	3:56
3.	"Walk Straight Down the Middle"	3:48

== Personnel ==
Personnel are lifted from The Sensual World album booklet.

- Kate Bush – writing, keyboards, production
- Paddy Bush – whips
- Del Palmer – bass, Fairlight percussion programming, recording
- Charlie Morgan – drums
- John Sheahan – fiddle
- Davy Spillane – uilleann pipes
- Dónal Lunny – bouzouki
- Paul Gomersall – additional recording
- Kevin Killen – additional recording, mixing
- Haydn Bendall – additional recording

== Charts ==
Chart (1989)	Peak position
Australia (ARIA)	44
Belgium (Ultratop 50 Flanders)	31
Canada Top Singles (RPM)	58
Europe (Eurochart Hot 100)	35
Finland (Suomen virallinen lista)	11
Ireland (IRMA)	6
Italy (Musica e dischi)	16
Luxembourg (Radio Luxembourg)	10
Netherlands (Dutch Top 40)	17
Netherlands (Single Top 100)	20
UK Singles (Official Charts)	12
US Alternative Airplay (Billboard)	6
West Germany (GfK)	29
