= Never for Ever =

Studio album by Kate Bush
- Released: 8 September 1980
- Recorded: September 1979 – May 1980
- Studios: Abbey Road and AIR, London
- Genres: Progressive pop; art rock; new wave
- Length: 37:16
- Labels: EMI (UK); EMI America (US); Harvest (Canada)
- Producers: Kate Bush; Jon Kelly

Kate Bush chronology
On Stage (1979)	Never for Ever (1980)	The Dreaming (1982)

Singles from Never for Ever
- 1. "Breathing" Released: 14 April 1980; 2. "Babooshka" Released: 27 June 1980; 3. "Army Dreamers" Released: 22 September 1980

Never for Ever is the third studio album by English singer-songwriter Kate Bush. Released on 8 September 1980 by EMI Records, it was Bush's first No. 1 album and was the first album by a British female solo artist to top the UK Albums Chart, as well as being the first album by any female solo artist to enter the chart at No. 1. It has since been certified Gold by the BPI. It features the UK Top 20 singles "Breathing", "Army Dreamers" and "Babooshka", the latter being one of Bush's biggest hits. Bush co-produced the album with Jon Kelly.

== Background ==
Beginning production after her 1979 tour, Never for Ever was Bush's second foray into production (her first was for the On Stage EP the previous year), aided by the engineer of Lionheart (1978), Jon Kelly. After initially considering Eric Stewart for the position of producer, she ultimately decided to produce Never for Ever herself alongside Jon Kelly, who was to be the audio engineer.

The first two albums had resulted in a particular sound, which was evident in every track, with lush orchestral arrangements supporting the live band sound. Andrew Powell had worked on the orchestration for those two albums, although Bush decided to proceed without him on Never for Ever. Bush commented that she had "nothing against Andrew at all because he is a fantastic arranger", but said that she was "strong-minded" and wanted to make more creative decisions on her own. The range of styles on Never for Ever is much more diverse, veering from the straightforward rocker "Violin" to the wistful waltz of hit single "Army Dreamers". Never for Ever was the first Kate Bush album to feature digital synthesizers and drum machines, in particular the Fairlight CMI, which was programmed by Richard James Burgess and John L. Walters. Like her previous two albums, it was initially composed on piano.

Bush's literary and cinematic influences were again to the fore. "The Infant Kiss", the story of a governess who is frightened by the adult feelings she has for her young male charge (who is possessed by the spirit of a grown man), was inspired by the 1961 film The Innocents, which in turn had been inspired by The Turn of the Screw by Henry James. "The Wedding List" drew from François Truffaut's 1968 film The Bride Wore Black. "Delius (Song of Summer)" was inspired by the 1968 Ken Russell television film Song of Summer, which portrays the last six years of the life of English composer Frederick Delius, when Eric Fenby acted as his amanuensis. Fenby is mentioned in the lyrics ("in B, Fenby"). "Blow Away (for Bill)" commemorates her lighting director Bill Duffield, who had been killed in an accident at Poole Arts Centre during her 1979 tour. The song links his name to those of several music stars who died in the previous three years—Minnie Riperton, Keith Moon, Sandy Denny, Sid Vicious, Marc Bolan—and one earlier icon, Buddy Holly.

Never for Ever is the only studio album by Bush up to Director's Cut (2011) not to have a title track. According to Bush, the title alluded to conflicting emotions, good and bad, which pass, as she stated: "we must tell our hearts that it is 'never for ever', and be happy that it's like that".

The album cover is an illustration (in pencil) by artist Nick Price, who had also designed the cover for the programme for her 1979 tour. Bush was pleased with the results (it depicts a multitude of animals and monsters emerging from under her skirt). Of the concept, Bush said that it reflects the title, depicting good and bad things that emerge from one's self. The album was released on compact disc in Japan in 1987 with the cover art modified. A section of the original cover art was enlarged, creating two different booklet covers: the outer one modified; and underneath the original. The album's cover was voted 'Greatest Album Cover of 1980' by Record Mirror.

"Violin" and "Egypt" were performed live during The Tour of Life in April–May 1979. "The Wedding List" was aired in a BBC Christmas Special on 28 December 1979.

== Release and critical reception ==
Professional ratings
Review scores
Source	Rating
AllMusic	3/5 stars
The Encyclopedia of Popular Music	3/5 stars
The Great Rock Discography	6/10
Mojo	4/5 stars
MusicHound Rock	3/5 stars
Q	4/5 stars
Record Mirror	3.5/5 stars
The Rolling Stone Album Guide	3/5 stars
Smash Hits	8/10
Spin Alternative Record Guide	6/10

With work on the album completed in May, Never for Ever was released on 8 September 1980. Over the following week, Bush undertook a record-signing tour of the UK – including London, which resulted in lengthy queues down Oxford Street. During October she also undertook promotional appearances for the album throughout Europe, most prominently in Germany and France. In the US, the album was initially unreleased following the failure of her debut. As Bush gained a cult following over the coming years, however, Never for Ever was belatedly released in 1984 following the entry into the charts of her fourth album, The Dreaming.

Never for Ever entered the UK Albums Chart for the week ending 20 September 1980, at No. 1. It remained there for one week and stayed in the top 75 for 23 weeks. The album became Bush's first record to reach the top position on the UK Albums Chart, also making her the first female British solo artist to achieve that status. Technically, Never for Ever is the first studio album (i.e. not a greatest hits compilation) by any solo female artist to reach number 1 in the UK. Barbra Streisand and Connie Francis achieved the feat prior to 1980, but only with compilation albums. (Diana Ross too had achieved three UK number 1 albums by then – but not only were those compilations, they were credited to Diana Ross & The Supremes, and were therefore not solo albums.)

Three singles were released from the album, all of which fared well in the charts. The first, "Breathing", reached No. 16 in the UK, as did the third, "Army Dreamers". The second single, "Babooshka", became one of Bush's biggest hits, peaking at No. 5 in the summer of 1980 in the UK and faring even better in Australia, where it reached No. 2 and was the 20th-best-selling single of the year.

In November 2018, Bush released box sets of remasters of her studio albums, including Never For Ever.

The album was favourably received by music critics at the time, save for a review in Record Mirror, which criticised it as "depressing" with "meanderingly unattractive" music. The publication was also complimentary of certain tracks, including "Babooshka", "Army Dreamers", and "Breathing". Based largely on this album, Bush was voted "Best female artist of 1980" in polls taken in Melody Maker, Sounds, the Sunday Telegraph, and Capital Radio. Bush herself has said that it was her favourite album to date. More recently, AllMusic gave the album a favourable review, complimenting the three singles most highly but said that Bush would improve on the formula on later albums. In 2020, Rolling Stone included Never for Ever in their "80 Greatest albums of 1980" list, praising Bush for her songwriting and her imagination.

In 2026 Mojo Magazine rated five of the album's songs ("Army Dreamers", "Babooshka", "Breathing", "Delius" and "Blow Away") among her top 50 songs. They said of the album that it was a transition to a status where "few could touch her".

== Track listing ==
All tracks are written by Kate Bush.

Side one
No.	Title	Length
1.	"Babooshka"	3:20
2.	"Delius (Song of Summer)"	2:51
3.	"Blow Away (For Bill)"	3:33
4.	"All We Ever Look For"	3:47
5.	"Egypt"	4:10
Total length:		17:41

Side two
No.	Title	Length
6.	"The Wedding List"	4:15
7.	"Violin"	3:15
8.	"The Infant Kiss"	2:50
9.	"Night Scented Stock"	0:51
10.	"Army Dreamers"	2:55
11.	"Breathing"	5:29
Total length:		19:35

== Personnel ==
Credits are adapted from the Never for Ever liner notes.

- Kate Bush – vocals; piano; keyboards; harmony vocals; Fairlight CMI digital sampling synthesizer; Yamaha CS-80 polyphonic synthesizer (1, 4); arranger
- John L. Walters and Richard James Burgess – Fairlight CMI programming
- Max Middleton – Fender Rhodes piano (1, 3, 5, 6, 11); Minimoog (5); string arrangements (3, 6)
- Duncan Mackay – Fairlight CMI (4, 10)
- Michael Moran – Prophet-5 synthesizer (5)
- Larry Fast – Prophet synthesizer (11)
- Alan Murphy – electric guitar (1, 2, 6, 7, 8, 11); electric guitar solo (7); acoustic guitar (4, 10); bass (10)
- Brian Bath – electric guitar (1, 6, 7, 11); acoustic guitar (3, 4, 10); backing vocals (6, 10)
- Paddy Bush – backing vocals (1, 4, 5, 6, 10); balalaika (1); sitar; bass vocals and voice of "Delius" (2); koto (4); strumento de porco (psaltery) (5); harmonica and musical saw (6); banshee (7); mandolin (10)
- Kevin Burke – violin (7)
- Adam Skeaping – viola da gamba (8); string arrangements (8)
- Joseph Skeaping – lironi (8); string arrangements (8)
- John Giblin – bass (1); fretless bass (11)
- Del Palmer – fretless bass (3); bass guitar (5, 6, 7)
- Preston Heyman – drums (3, 5, 6, 7); percussion (2, 3, 5); backing vocals (4, 6)
- Stuart Elliott – drums (1, 11); bodhrán (10)
- Roland – percussion (2)
- Morris Pert – timpani (4); percussion (11)
- Ian Bairnson – bass vocals (2)
- Gary Hurst – backing vocals (1, 4)
- Andrew Bryant – backing vocals (4)
- Roy Harper – backing vocals (11)
- The Martyn Ford Orchestra – strings (3, 6)

Production

- Kate Bush – producer
- Jon Kelly – co-producer; recording engineer
- Jon Jacobs – assistant engineer

== Charts ==
=== Weekly charts ===
Initial weekly chart performance for Never for Ever
Chart (1980)	Peak position
Australian Albums (Kent Music Report)	7
Canada Top Albums/CDs (RPM)	44
Dutch Albums (Album Top 100)	4
French Albums (IFOP)	1
German Albums (Offizielle Top 100)	5
Israeli Albums (IBA)	5
Japanese Albums (Oricon)	40
New Zealand Albums (RMNZ)	31
Norwegian Albums (VG-lista)	2
Swedish Albums (Sverigetopplistan)	16
UK Albums (Official Charts)	1

2014 weekly chart performance for Never for Ever
Chart (2014)	Peak position
UK Albums (Official Charts)	38

2024 weekly chart performance for Never for Ever
Chart (2024)	Peak position
UK Record Store Chart	20

=== Year-end charts ===
Year-end chart performance for Never for Ever
Chart (1980)	Position
Australian Albums (Kent Music Report)	55
Dutch Albums (Album Top 100)	31
French Albums (IFOP)	34
German Albums (Offizielle Top 100)	58
UK Albums (OCC)	27

== Certifications and sales ==
Certifications for Never for Ever
Region	Certification	Certified units/sales
Canada (Music Canada)	Platinum	100,000^{^}
France (SNEP)	Gold	100,000^{*}
Germany (BVMI)	Gold	250,000^{^}
Japan (Oricon)	—	17,910
Netherlands (NVPI)	Gold	50,000^{^}
United Kingdom (BPI)	Gold	100,000^{^}
United States	—	39,000
^{*} Sales figures based on certification alone.^{^} Shipments figures based on certification alone.

== See also ==
- Kate Bush discography
- List of awards and nominations received by Kate Bush
