= There Goes a Tenner =

1982 song by Kate Bush

Single by Kate Bush

from the album The Dreaming
- B-side: "Ne t'enfuis pas"
- Released: 1 November 1982
- Genre: Avant-pop; music hall; novelty
- Length: 3:26
- Label: EMI
- Songwriter: Kate Bush
- Producer: Kate Bush

Kate Bush singles chronology
"The Dreaming" (1982)	"There Goes a Tenner" (1982)	"Suspended in Gaffa" (1982)

Music video
- "There Goes a Tenner" on YouTube

"There Goes a Tenner" is a song by the English singer Kate Bush. It was released as a single on 1 November 1982, the third to be taken from her album The Dreaming. It was released as a 7-inch single in the UK and Ireland only. The single peaked at No. 93 and spent two weeks in the UK singles chart.

== Background ==
"There Goes a Tenner" attracted no interest from radio stations and television stations. The single did not sell well and became Bush's first single to miss the top 75 in the UK. It was originally intended to be Bush's first twelve-inch single, but its disappointing sales performance caused plans for the 12-inch to be cancelled.

The song's lyrics concern a bungled bank robbery as told by a fearful and paranoid perpetrator. As Bush stated;

"It's about amateur robbers who have only done small things, and this is quite a big robbery that they've been planning for months, and when it actually starts happening, they start freaking out. They're really scared, and they're so aware of the fact that something could go wrong that they're paranoid and want to go home."

Towards the end of the song, the lyrics and tone take on a dream-like state, which is reflected in the video. A review in Record Mirror commented that despite the comic tone of the song, the end left a rather unnerving effect. Bush sang it in what has been described as "a curious accent that seemed to veer from an aristocrat to an East End villain" (see mockney).

The B-side, "Ne t'enfuis pas" ("Don't Run Away") is spelt incorrectly on the actual single as "Ne T'en Fui Pas", which has no meaning in French.

== Critical reception ==
Upon its release as a single, Neil Tennant of Smash Hits described "There Goes a Tenner" as "very weird". He noted that Bush "sings a fractured tune partly in a cockney accent" and added the song has "a haunting atmosphere that lingers after the record has finished". Richard Cook of NME called it "a peculiar choice" for a single "from a baffling LP" and commented, "Rococo embellishments flit around this odd story like fireflies in a belfry, the tale told in the usual Berlitz range of voices."

== Personnel ==
- Kate Bush – piano, Fairlight CMI, Yamaha CS-80, vocals
- Del Palmer – bass guitar
- Stuart Elliott – drums
- Dave Lawson – Synclavier

== Chart performance ==
Chart (1982)	Peak position
UK Singles (OCC)	93
