= Breathing (Kate Bush song) =

Single by Kate Bush

from the album Never for Ever
- B-side: "The Empty Bullring"
- Released: 14 April 1980
- Studio: Abbey Road Studios (London, England)
- Genre: Progressive rock
- Length: 4:52 (Video edit); 5:30 (Album version)
- Label: EMI 5058
- Songwriter: Kate Bush
- Producers: Kate Bush, Jon Kelly

Kate Bush singles chronology
"Strange Phenomena" (1979)	"Breathing" (1980)	"Babooshka" (1980)

Music video
- "Breathing" on YouTube

"Breathing" is a song by Kate Bush, from her 1980 album Never for Ever, with backing vocals by Roy Harper.

The single debuted on BBC Radio 1 on 11 April 1980 and was issued three days later as the album's lead single, peaking at number 16 in the UK charts and remaining in the charts for seven weeks. It was the first single by Bush to feature a non-LP track on its B-side, "The Empty Bullring".

== Content ==
"Breathing" is about a foetus, very much aware of what is going on outside the womb and frightened by nuclear fallout. The lyrics also refer to the unborn baby absorbing nicotine from the mother's smoking. In an interview that year Bush described the song as her "little symphony", adding that she considered it her best work to date. Bush stated that the information within the song mostly came from a documentary she had seen about the effects of nuclear war, while the tone of the song was inspired by Pink Floyd's The Wall (side three in particular).

Larry Fast, who played a Prophet synthesiser on the song, first encountered Bush while the two were conducting overdubs for a Peter Gabriel recording session. Bush invited Fast to Abbey Road Studios for the purpose of creating electronic orchestration that emulated his work with Gabriel. Fast recalled that he recorded his parts over the course of a few days and largely deferred to Bush for the synth arrangement. "She had particular things she wanted done and I have to say they were absolutely right for her music." In a 1980 interview, Bush recalled that Fast recorded his parts in one day at Studio 2 of Abbey Road Studios. She mentioned that all work on the remaining tracks from Never for Ever were temporarily put on hold to prioritise the completion of "Breathing", which was set to be released as a single.

Larry came in for a day and he was wonderful. We were all gathering such an intense vibe working on the one very nuclear song. We'd been working on it until about five or six in the morning each day for about a week. It was very intense in the studio and very nuclear. It felt just like a fallout shelter.

The music video features Bush in a womb portraying a foetus. Bush performed the song live in a benefit concert for Comic Relief in April 1986. In 1985, Bush donated the song as her contribution to the multi-artist compilation Greenpeace – The Album.

== Personnel ==
Credits are adapted from the Never for Ever liner notes.

- Kate Bush – lead and backing vocals, piano
- Roy Harper – backing vocals
- Alan Murphy – electric guitar
- Brian Bath – electric guitar
- John Giblin – fretless bass
- Larry Fast – Prophet synthesiser
- Stuart Elliott – drums
- Morris Pert – percussion

== Charts ==
Chart (1980)	Peak position
UK Singles (Official Charts)	16
Netherlands (Tipparade)	14
Netherlands (Single Top 100)	44

== See also ==
- List of anti-war songs
