= The Big Sky (song) =

1986 single by Kate Bush

- Standard artwork

Single by Kate Bush

from the album Hounds of Love
- B-side: "Not This Time"; "The Morning Fog" (12" only)
- Released: 21 April 1986
- Recorded: 1984
- Studio: Wickham Farm Home Studios (Welling, England); Windmill Lane Studios (Dublin, Ireland)
- Genre: Art rock
- Length: 4:34 (special single mix); 4:42 (album version)
- Label: EMI
- Songwriter: Kate Bush
- Producer: Kate Bush

Kate Bush singles chronology
"Hounds of Love" (1986)	"The Big Sky" (1986)	"Don't Give Up" (1986)

Music video
- "The Big Sky" on YouTube

"The Big Sky" is a song by English singer-songwriter Kate Bush. Released in April 1986, it was the fourth and final single to be released from her No. 1 album Hounds of Love (1985). The single peaked at No. 37 and spent 5 weeks in the UK Singles Chart.

The 7" single was released as the "special single mix", which includes a different intro and edited dubs before the final refrain. This version appears as a B-side on the 1994 CD single "The Red Shoes". The 12" single includes an extended version of "The Big Sky" called the "Meteorological mix". A limited edition 7" picture disc was also released.

The song is about remembering some of the simple pleasures enjoyed as children that most no longer find the time for, such as spending the afternoon looking at the sky, watching the clouds take on shapes.

The B-side is "Not This Time". The 12" single B-side includes an additional track, "The Morning Fog" from the Hounds of Love album. The music video was directed by Bush herself. In 1987, "The Big Sky" was nominated for Best Female Video at the MTV Video Music Awards.

== Critical reception ==
Upon its release, Richard Cook of Sounds picked "The Big Sky" as the magazine's "single of the week". He described it as a "moment of real, mad bravado" and "the best and most threatening thing this bizarre talent has ever done".

== Track listing ==
7-inch single (UK)
No.	Title	Length
1.	"The Big Sky" (special single mix)	4:34
2.	"Not This Time"	3:41

12-inch single (UK)
No.	Title	Length
1.	"The Big Sky" (Meteorological mix)	7:44
2.	"Not This Time"	3:41
3.	"The Morning Fog"	2:35

== Personnel ==
- Kate Bush – vocals, Fairlight CMI, piano
- Paddy Bush – didgeridoo
- Alan Murphy – guitar
- Martin Glover – bass guitar
- Charlie Morgan – drums, handclaps
- Del Palmer – LinnDrum programming, handclaps
- Morris Pert – percussion

== Charts ==
Chart (1986)	Peak position
Europe (European Top 100 Singles)	88
Irish Singles Chart	15
Luxembourg (Radio Luxembourg)	26
UK Singles Chart	37
