= Army Dreamers =

Single by Kate Bush

from the album Never for Ever
- B-side: "Delius"; "Passing Through Air"
- Released: 22 September 1980
- Studio: Abbey Road Studios (London, England)
- Genre: Baroque pop
- Length: 3:17 (single album); 2:58 (LP version)
- Label: EMI
- Songwriter: Kate Bush
- Producers: Kate Bush; Jon Kelly

Kate Bush singles chronology
| "Babooshka" (1980) | "Army Dreamers" (1980) | "December Will Be Magic Again" (1980) |

Music video
- "Army Dreamers" on YouTube

"Army Dreamers" is a 1980 song, the third and final single to be released from the album Never for Ever, by Kate Bush. It was a UK top 20 hit in October 1980.

== Background ==
"Army Dreamers" was released on the 22 September 1980 and peaked at number 16 in the UK Singles Chart. The song is about the effects of war and about a mother who grieves for her young adult son, who was killed on military manoeuvres. Saddened by his unnecessary death, she wrestles with her guilt over what she could have done to prevent it. The song is a waltz, which marks a change from Bush's previous singles. The version on the original single release is longer than on the album release; the album version fades, whereas the single release has a dead ending (the version of the single from The Single File, however, fades like the album release).

The single includes two B-sides, "Delius" and "Passing Through Air." "Delius" is Bush's tribute to English composer Frederick Delius. The subtitle, "Song of Summer," comes from one of Delius's works, and from a BBC film Bush saw about the composer's life. The album version is different in that the previous track "Babooshka" segues into it, whereas the single B-side version begins unobscured. "Passing Through Air" is one of Bush's earliest works, originally recorded in 1973 at David Gilmour's studio, a few weeks after her 15th birthday.

The term "BFPO" in the lyrics refers to "British Forces Post Office".

"Army Dreamers" was one of 68 songs considered inappropriate for airplay by the BBC during the first Gulf War.

== Promotional video ==
The music video opens on a closeup of Kate Bush, dressed in a camouflage uniform holding a child. She blinks in synchronisation with the song's sampled gun cocks. The camera pulls out and shows that Bush has a white-haired child on her lap. The child walks off and returns in military combat uniform, and during the first pre-chorus, as Bush responds to her bandmates' comments, the child grows up into a 20-year-old. Bush and several soldiers (two of whom, Bush included, have "KT8" or "KTB" stencilled onto the stocks of their rifles: "KTB" was a monogram used by Bush early in her career) make their way through woodland, amid explosions. As the song progresses, Bush reaches out in an attempt to embrace or grasp the child soldier, but he disappears before she can. Finally, Bush is blown up and soldiers flee from an explosion.

Bush has stated that this video is one of the few examples of her work that completely satisfies her:

For me that's the closest that I've got to a little bit of film. And it was very pleasing for me to watch the ideas I'd thought of actually working beautifully. Watching it on the screen. It really was a treat, that one. I think that's the first time ever with anything I've done I can actually sit back and say "I liked that." That's the only thing. Everything else I can sit there going "Oh look at that, that's out of place." So I'm very pleased with that one, artistically.

== Legacy ==
In 1988, Israeli singer Mazzi Cohen released a Hebrew cover of the song titled "Shem Ba'even" (Hebrew: שם באבן, lit. "A Name on a Stone"). The version became a staple of Yom HaZikaron (Israel's Memorial Day) due to its shared themes of loss and military service.

In 2024 the song gained new attention by revival through TikTok increasing its popularity among younger generations. The surge in interest saw a 1,300% increase in streams. As of July 2026, it is Bush's second most-played song on Spotify.

== Track listing ==
1. "Army Dreamers" – 3:17
2. "Delius" – 2:51
3. "Passing Through Air" – 2:10

== Personnel ==
Credits are adapted from the Never for Ever liner notes.

- Kate Bush – lead vocals
- Paddy Bush – mandolin, backing vocals
- Brian Bath – acoustic guitar, backing vocals
- Alan Murphy – electric guitar, acoustic bass guitar, backing vocals
- Duncan Mackay – Fairlight CMI
- Stuart Elliott – bodhrán

== Charts ==
| Chart (1980) | Peak position |
|---|---|
| Ireland (IRMA) | 14 |
| Israel (IBA) | 2 |
| Luxembourg (Radio Luxembourg) | 6 |
| Netherlands (Dutch Top 40) | 36 |
| Netherlands (Single Top 100) | 25 |
| UK Singles (Official Charts) | 16 |

== Certifications ==
| Region | Certification | Certified units/sales |
|---|---|---|
| United Kingdom (BPI) | Gold | 400,000^{‡} |
^{‡} Sales+streaming figures based on certification alone.

== See also ==
- List of anti-war songs
