= The Dreaming (song) =

1982 song by Kate Bush

Single by Kate Bush

from the album The Dreaming
- B-side: "Dreamtime"
- Released: 26 July 1982
- Recorded: 1981
- Genre: Art rock; worldbeat
- Length: 4:09 (single version); 4:43 (album version)
- Label: EMI
- Songwriter: Kate Bush
- Producer: Kate Bush

Kate Bush singles chronology
"Sat in Your Lap" (1981)	"The Dreaming" (1982)	"There Goes a Tenner" (1982)

Music video
- "The Dreaming" on YouTube

"The Dreaming" is the title song from Kate Bush's fourth studio album The Dreaming and was released as a single on 26 July 1982. "The Dreaming" peaked at No. 48 and spent 3 weeks in the UK singles chart.

The song is about the destruction of Aboriginal Australians' traditional lands by white Australians in their quest for weapons-grade uranium. Bird impersonator Percy Edwards provided sheep noises.

The title is based on The Dreaming, a concept in Aboriginal mythology. The original title for the track was "The Abo Song", which unwittingly made use of a racial slur; promotional 7-inch copies were circulated before being recalled. A 12-inch single was also mooted but ultimately rejected by EMI for "not being commercially viable".

An alternative version of "The Dreaming", entitled "Dreamtime", was used as the UK single B-side. It is usually referred to as an instrumental version of "The Dreaming": while the track omits the sung lead vocals, it retains most of the backing vocals. "Dreamtime" contains both an extended intro and outro.

The cover art is by Del Palmer, Bush's partner at the time and a bass player. It features a depiction of the Wandjina, a sky spirit in Western Australian traditions.

== Critical reception ==
Upon its release, Vivien Goldman of the NME called "The Dreaming" "bold", "good", and the "most unusual record of the week". She noted that it's "full of environmental drones and atavistic thumps, with Kate singing in some kind of accent, presumably supposed to be aboriginal." Dave Lewis of Sounds was negative in his review, writing, "Her discovery of what sounds like the Aussie aboriginal funeral march results in a churning, chundering chant that's soporific in the extreme." Daniela Suave of Record Mirror called it an "ambitious" song that was "one hell of a jumble."

== Personnel ==
- Kate Bush – lead and backing vocals; piano; Fairlight CMI
- Paddy Bush – bullroarer; backing vocals
- Rolf Harris – didgeridoo
- Stuart Elliott – drums
- Percy Edwards – animal sounds
- Gosfield Goers – crowd noises

== Charts ==
Chart (1982)	Peak position
Australia (Kent Music Report)	91
Luxembourg (Radio Luxembourg)	26
UK Singles (OCC)	48

== See also ==
- Songline
