= Sat in Your Lap =

1981 song by Kate Bush

Single by Kate Bush

from the album The Dreaming
- B-side: "Lord of the Reedy River" (Donovan)
- Released: 29 June 1981
- Recorded: 1981 (single version); 1982 (re-recorded parts and mixing of album version)
- Genre: Avant-pop; progressive pop
- Length: 3:29
- Label: EMI
- Songwriter: Kate Bush
- Producer: Kate Bush

Kate Bush singles chronology
"December Will Be Magic Again" (1980)	"Sat in Your Lap" (1981)	"The Dreaming" (1982)

Music video
- "Sat in Your Lap" on YouTube

Audio sample
- "Sat in Your Lap": file; help

"Sat in Your Lap" is a song by the English art rock musician Kate Bush. It was the first single to be released from her fourth studio album, The Dreaming (1982), issued 15 months prior to the album's release. The single peaked at No. 11 and spent 7 weeks in the UK singles chart.

== Music ==
Musically, the single was faster and more percussive than Bush's previous releases. It features Preston Heyman on drums recorded in the stone room at the Townhouse Studio 2, London, and Paddy Bush and Preston on whip-like percussion (played on bamboo canes swooshing through the air, rhythmically). Critic Simon Reynolds called it "an avant-pop stampede of pounding percussion and deranged shrieks, a sister-song to Public Image Ltd's 'Flowers of Romance'." The lyrics of the song deal with feelings of existential frustration and the quest for knowledge. In his biography on Kate Bush, Graeme Thomson claims that the title of the song suggests the possibility of experiencing enlightenment through sex.

== Release ==
Kate Bush stated in an early interview that the single version was remixed slightly for inclusion on The Dreaming, with some parts re-recorded for the album. The vocals were raised higher and the backing track altered to better fit the overall feel of the album.

The demo version of "Sat in Your Lap" contains an extra verse at the start, which was later cut. As with subsequent singles from the album, a 12-inch vinyl single was planned but was eventually withdrawn.

The B-side to the single was a cover version (Bush's first) of "Lord of the Reedy River" by Donovan from his 1971 album HMS Donovan.

The video to the single was filmed in Abbey Road Studios.

== Critical reception ==
Upon its release, Paul Du Noyer of the NME stated that Bush has "penned some very beautiful tunes, but when she turns all aggressive and strident, as she does here, the consequences are frankly excruciating".

== Personnel ==
- Kate Bush – lead and backing vocals; piano; Fairlight CMI
- Paddy Bush – bamboo sticks; backing vocals
- Preston Heyman – drums; bamboo sticks
- Jimmy Bain – bass guitar
- Geoff Downes – CMI trumpet section
- Stewart Arnold – backing vocals
- Ian Bairnson – backing vocals
- Gary Hurst – backing vocals

== Charts ==
Chart (1981)	Peak position
Australia (Kent Music Report)	93
Luxembourg (Radio Luxembourg)	7
Netherlands (Single Top 100)	32
Ireland (IRMA)	18
Italy (Musica e Dischi)	25
Spain (Productores de Música de España)	30
UK Singles Chart	11
