= Del Palmer =

English musician and sound engineer (1952–2024)

- Born: Derek Peter Palmer; 3 November 1952; Greenwich, London, England
- Died: 5 January 2024 (aged 71)
- Genres: Alternative rock; art rock; R&B; jazz
- Occupations: Audio engineer; bassist
- Instruments: Bass guitar; keyboards; percussion
- Years active: 1967–2021
- Label: Credible
- Formerly of: Cobwebs and Strange; Tame; KT Bush Band

Derek Peter Palmer (3 November 1952 – 5 January 2024) was an English musician and sound engineer, known for his work with the singer-songwriter Kate Bush, with whom he also had a relationship from the late 1970s to the early 1990s. He released his first solo studio album, Leap of Faith, in 2007, followed by Gift in 2010 and Point of Safe Return in 2015.

== Early life ==
Palmer was born in Greenwich, in southeast London, United Kingdom. In 1967, Palmer began playing bass, and joined friend Brian Bath's band, Cobwebs and Strange. In 1969, Palmer and Bath formed Tame with Victor King on drums. The band lasted until 1970. From 1972, Palmer and Bath were in Company with Barry Sherlock (guitar) and Lionel Azulay (drums). They signed to Cube Records in 1973. When Azulay was injured in a road accident, Charlie Morgan joined on drums in 1974 and the band changed its name to Conkers.

In 1977, the KT Bush Band was formed with Kate Bush, Palmer, Bath, and Vic King, playing the pub circuit. Their live set included material that would later appear on Bush's first album. Beginning with her second album, Lionheart (1978), Palmer became one of Bush's main studio bassists (along with John Giblin) and toured with her in 1979.

Palmer was an engineer on Bush's Hounds of Love (1985), The Sensual World (1989), The Red Shoes (1993) and Aerial (2005). He appeared in several of Bush's music videos; in 1982, he played the getaway car driver in the video for "There Goes a Tenner", and in 1986, appeared in the critically acclaimed extended "Experiment IV" video, in which he plays a patient in a secret military base where the 'experiment' of the song's title is performed on him with horrific consequences. The clip, described as a 'film in miniature' also features Hugh Laurie, Peter Vaughan, Dawn French and Paddy Bush; it was banned from broadcast on the BBC programme, Top of the Pops, due to the graphic nature of the video. The music video, directed by Bush herself, went on to be nominated for the Best Concept Music Video at the 1988 Grammy Awards.

Also in 1986, he appeared in the video to "The Big Sky" as a guitar-playing army major, which, in 1987, was nominated for Best Female Video at the MTV Video Music Awards. Del Palmer also appeared as Houdini, the man about to be kissed by Bush on the front cover to her 1982 album, The Dreaming.

Palmer engineered three further albums involving Bush: Midge Ure's Answers to Nothing (where Palmer engineered her vocal guest recordings), Roy Harper's Once and Alan Stivell's Again.

He played bass guitar on Lionheart, Never for Ever, The Dreaming, Hounds of Love, The Sensual World and Aerial (on 5 tracks), and on one track on 50 Words for Snow. Palmer played bass on Billy Sherwood's Back Against the Wall and Return to the Dark Side of the Moon, both Pink Floyd tribute albums.

Palmer released his first solo album, Leap of Faith, in 2007, followed by a five-track EP, Outtees & Alternatives, in 2008. He released his second album, Gift, in 2010. His third album, Point of Safe Return, was released in March 2015. In 2018, Palmer played a series of concerts in England and Ireland, with members of Kate Bush tribute band Cloudbusting to celebrate 40 years since the release of her first album.

He appeared in the BBC television documentary Queens of British Pop discussing Kate Bush, and in the BBC Four documentary The Kate Bush Story – Running Up That Hill.

== Death ==
Palmer died on 5 January 2024, at the age of 71. Bush wrote a tribute on her website, praising his creativity and skill, and said she would "miss him terribly".

== Discography ==
- Leap of Faith (2007)
- Gift (2010)
- Point of Safe Return (2015)
