= Babooshka (song) =

1980 single by Kate Bush

Single by Kate Bush

from the album Never for Ever
- B-side: "Ran Tan Waltz"
- Released: 27 June 1980
- Recorded: January–June 1980
- Studio: Abbey Road Studios (London, England)
- Genre: Art rock
- Length: 3:26
- Label: EMI
- Songwriter: Kate Bush
- Producers: Kate Bush; Jon Kelly

Kate Bush singles chronology
"Breathing" (1980)	"Babooshka" (1980)	"Army Dreamers" (1980)

Music video
- "Babooshka" on YouTube

Audio sample
- file; help

"Babooshka" is a song by the English singer, songwriter Kate Bush, taken from her third studio album Never for Ever (1980). Released as a single on 27 June 1980, it spent 10 weeks in the UK chart, peaking at number five. It was an even bigger hit in Australia, where it peaked at number two (for three weeks) and was the 20th best-selling single of the year.

A rock song, "Babooshka" is about a woman who sends love letters to her husband under the titular pen name. The song makes notable use of a Fairlight CMI digital synthesizer.

== Background and composition ==
Kate Bush recorded "Babooshka" between January and June 1980, during the recording sessions of Never for Ever. The track features John Giblin on bass and marks the significance of fretless bass sounds as instrumental "male" partners through Bush's music in the early eighties. The song ends with a sample of glass breaking, one of the earliest examples of a sample created with the newly available Fairlight CMI digital synthesizer.

According to an interview Bush gave to the Australian TV series Countdown in 1980, the song chronicles a wife's desire to test her husband's loyalty. To do so, she takes on the pen name of Babooshka and sends notes to her husband in the guise of a younger woman—something which she fears is the opposite of how her husband currently sees her. Hence, the barbed lines "Just like his wife before she 'freezed' on him/Just like his wife when she was beautiful." The trap is set when, in her bitterness and paranoia, Babooshka arranges to meet her husband, who is attracted to the character who reminds him of his wife in earlier times. She thereby ruins the relationship due to her paranoia. Bush said that she was originally unaware that "бaбушка" (babushka) was the Russian word for "grandmother."

Bush cited the English folk song "Sovay", in which a woman dresses as a highwayman and accosts her lover in order to test his devotion, as an inspiration for the story of Babooshka. "I'm sure I heard about it on some TV series years ago, when I was a kid," Bush remarked of the song's story. "You know, these period things that the BBC do. I think it's an extraordinary thing for someone to do... That's why I found it fascinating."

The B-side contains her song "Ran Tan Waltz," her second non-album B-side. This song is performed as a tragicomedy, where Bush portrays a man bemoaning his bad luck in life being married to a wayward mother. This song uses the word "dick" in the first verse as dysphemism for a penis. Bush has stated that she does not typically use such harsh language or write such sexually explicit material, but that she considered the song "good naughty fun."

== Music video ==
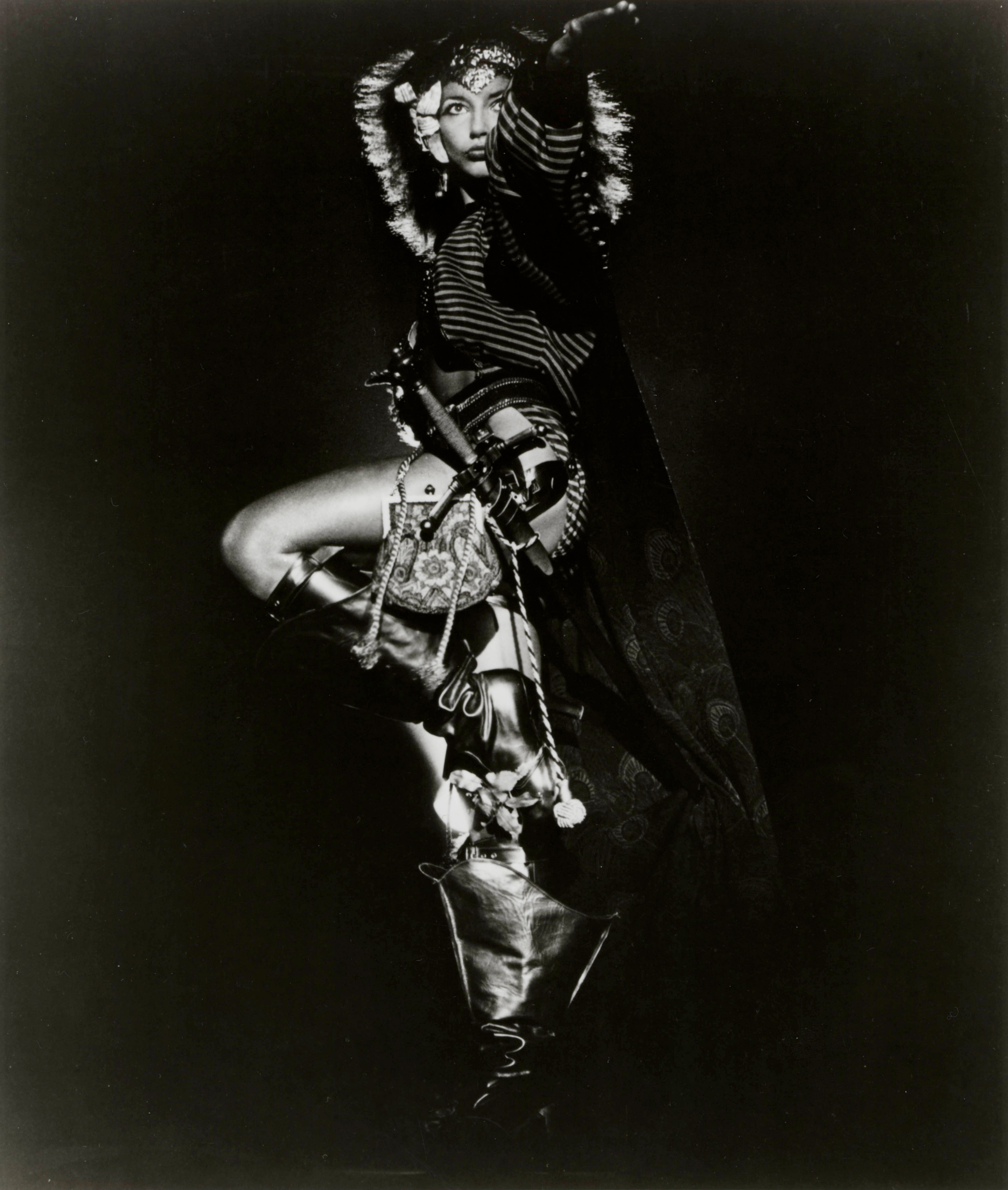
Bush in her Babooshka costume

The music video depicts Bush beside a double bass (contrabass) that symbolises the husband, wearing a black bodysuit and a veil in her role as the embittered wife. This changes into an extravagant, mythlike, and rather revealing "Russian" costume as her alter-ego, Babooshka. An illustration by Chris Achilleos for the cover of the 1978 book Raven – Swordsmistress of Chaos was the basis for the costume.

== Critical reception ==
Paul Du Noyer of NME described the song as "More luxuriant weirdness from sultry songstress with high-pitched voice".

"Babooshka" became Bush's second top five hit in the UK and was certified silver for sales of over 250,000 by the BPI.

In 2021, the song experienced a resurgence in popularity due to the app TikTok.

== Track listing ==
All tracks are written by Kate Bush.

UK 7-inch single
No.	Title	Length
1.	"Babooshka"	3:28
2.	"Ran Tan Waltz"	2:40

== Personnel ==
- Kate Bush – vocals; piano; Fairlight CMI; Yamaha CS-80
- Paddy Bush – balalaika; backing vocals
- Garry Hurst – backing vocals
- Alan Murphy – electric guitar
- Brian Bath – electric guitar
- John Giblin – electric bass
- Max Middleton – Fender Rhodes piano
- Stuart Elliott – drums; tambourine

== Charts ==
=== Weekly charts ===
Weekly chart performance for "Babooshka"
Chart (1980)	Peak position
Argentina	8
Australia (Kent Music Report)	2
Finland (Suomen virallinen lista)	25
Ireland (IRMA)	5
Israel (IBA)	5
Italy (Musica e Dischi)	6
Luxembourg (Radio Luxembourg)	2
Netherlands (Dutch Top 40)	15
Netherlands (Single Top 100)	24
New Zealand (Recorded Music NZ)	8
Norway (VG-lista)	4
South Africa (Springbok Radio)	12
UK Singles (Official Charts)	5
West Germany (GfK)	14
France (IFOP)	5
Chart (2014)	Peak position
France (SNEP)	186
Chart (2022)	Peak position
UK Singles Downloads (Official Charts)	67

=== Year-end charts ===
Year-end chart performance for "Babooshka"
Chart (1980)	Position
Australia (Kent Music Report)	20
UK Singles (OCC)	84

== Certifications and sales ==
Certifications and sales for "Babooshka"
Region	Certification	Certified units/sales
France	—	400,000
New Zealand (RMNZ)	Gold	15,000^{‡}
United Kingdom (BPI) Physical	Silver	250,000^{^}
United Kingdom (BPI) Digital	Gold	400,000^{‡}
^{^} Shipments figures based on certification alone.^{‡} Sales+streaming figures based on certification alone.
