= The Line, the Cross and the Curve =

1993 film by Kate Bush

The Line, The Cross and the Curve
- Directed by: Kate Bush
- Written by: Kate Bush
- Produced by: Margarita Doyle
- Starring: Kate Bush; Miranda Richardson; Lindsay Kemp
- Cinematography: Roger Pratt
- Edited by: Julian Rodd
- Music by: Kate Bush
- Distributed by: Picture Music International
- Release dates: 13 November 1993 (London Film Festival); 6 May 1994
- Running time: 50 minutes
- Language: English

The Line, the Cross and the Curve is a 1993 British musical short film written and directed by and starring singer Kate Bush, co-starring Miranda Richardson and choreographer Lindsay Kemp, who had served as dance mentor to Bush early in her career. The film accompanied her sixth studio album The Red Shoes.

The short film is essentially an extended music video, featuring songs from Bush's 1993 album, The Red Shoes, which in turn was inspired by the classic movie musical-fantasy The Red Shoes.

In this version of the tale, Bush plays a frustrated singer-dancer who is enticed by a mysterious woman (Richardson) into putting on a pair of magical ballet slippers. Once on her feet, the shoes start dancing on their own, and Bush's character (who is never referred to by name) must battle Richardson's character to free herself from the spell of the shoes. Her guide on this strange journey is played by Kemp.

The film was released direct-to-video in most areas, and was only a modest success. Kate Bush later expressed her displeasure with the final product, calling it "a load of bollocks". Soon after its release, Bush effectively dropped out of the public eye until her eighth studio album, Aerial, released in November 2005.

Two years after the UK release, due to late promotion in the US, the film was nominated for the Grammy Award for Best Long Form Music Video in 1996.

The film continues to be played in arthouse cinemas around the world, and was screened at Hollywood Theatre in 2014 along with modern dance interpretations to Bush's music.

== Plot ==
A singer practises with her band and a dancer ("Rubberband Girl"). After everyone else leaves, she remains in the studio and sings to herself by candlelight ("And So Is Love").

A woman crashes through the studio's mirror, claiming to have survived a fire, and asks the singer to help her return home by drawing symbols on three pieces of paper: a line, a cross, and a curve. In return, she offers the singer her red ballet shoes. The strange woman tells the singer that the curve represents her smile; the cross, her heart; and the line, her path. The bandages around her hands spin off, alerting the singer that something is wrong, but before she can do anything, the shoes tie themselves to her feet. The villain returns through the mirror, and a man faintly appears and gestures to the singer. She crashes through the mirror into their world ("The Red Shoes").

The man begins acting as the singer's guide. He is able to calm the shoes, but tells the singer that she must "sing back the symbols" to escape the villain's power. He takes her to meet Lily, a mystic who offers her protection and advice and helps her to recover the line ("Lily"). On the guide's advice, the singer recalls her loved ones, including some who have died, thus recovering the cross ("Moments of Pleasure").

The villain reappears and taunts the singer, but the singer realises she is merely scared of losing her power. She chases the villain, trying to retake the three pieces of paper on which she drew. They encounter a group of people joyfully dancing on a carpet of fruits, and the singer joins them while the villain continues to flee ("Eat the Music"). After the singer collapses in happy exhaustion, the papers fly from the villain's hand into hers, and the shoes return to the villain's feet. The singer returns through the mirror to her own world. The villain is buried in a pile of rubble, but her feet, controlled by the shoes, emerge and continue to dance.

== Cast ==
- Kate Bush as the singer
- Miranda Richardson as the villain
- Lindsay Kemp as the guide
- Lily Conford as Lily
- Stewart Arnold and Peter Richardson as dancers
- Christopher Banaman, John Chesworth, Vernon Nurse and Robert Smith as the four angels
- Paddy Bush and Colin Lloyd Tucker as the devils

== Track listing ==
1. "Rubberband Girl" 4:33
2. "And So Is Love" 5:32
3. "The Red Shoes" 4:02
4. "Lily" 4:05
5. "The Red Shoes" (instrumental) 6:58
6. "Moments of Pleasure" 4:32
7. "Eat the Music" 5:07
8. "The Red Shoes" 3:57

== Footage reuse ==
All songs apart from "Lily" were used as promotional videos for the corresponding singles from Bush's The Red Shoes album.

The "Rubberband Girl" and "Moments of Pleasure" clips were included on the video compilation The Whole Story '94.
