= Director's cut =

Stage in the film editing process or an alternate version of a film

In public use, a director's cut is the director's preferred version of a film (or video game, television episode, music video, commercial, etc.). It is generally considered a marketing term to represent the version of a film the director prefers, and is usually used in contrast to a theatrical release of that film where the director did not have final cut privilege and did not agree with what was released. The word "cut" is used in this context as a synecdoche to refer to the entire film editing process and the resulting product. Traditionally, films were edited by literally cutting strips of film and splicing them together.

Most of the time, film directors do not have the "final cut" (final say on the version released to the public). Those with money invested in the film, such as the production companies, distributors, or studios, may make changes intended to make the film more profitable at the box office. In extreme cases that can sometimes mean a different ending, less ambiguity, or excluding scenes that would earn a more audience-restricting rating, but more often means that the film is simply shortened to provide more screenings per day.

With the rise of home video, the phrase became more generically used as a marketing term to communicate to consumers that this is the director's preferred edit of a film, and it implies the director was not happy with the version that was originally released. Sometimes there are big disagreements between the director's vision and the producer's vision, and the director's preferred edit is sought after by fans (for example Terry Gilliam's Brazil).

Not all films have separate "director's cuts" (often the director is happy with the theatrical release, even if they didn't have final cut privilege), and sometimes separate versions of films are released as "director's cuts" even if the director doesn't prefer them. One example is Ridley Scott's Alien, which had a "director's cut" released in 2003, even though the director said it was purely for "marketing purposes" and didn't represent his preferred vision for the film.

Sometimes alternate edits are released, which are not necessarily director's preferred cuts, but which showcase different visions for the project for fans to enjoy. Examples include James Cameron's Avatar, which was released as both a "Special Edition" and "Extended" cuts, and Peter Jackson's Lord of the Rings, which were released on home video as "Extended Editions". These versions do not represent the director's preferred visions.

The term since expanded to include media such as video games, comic books and music albums (the latter two of which don't actually have directors).

== Original use of the phrase ==
Within the industry itself, a "director's cut" refers to a stage in the editing process, and is not usually what a director wants to release to the public, due to the fact it is unfinished. The editing process of a film is broken into stages: First is the assembly/rough cut, where all selected takes are put together in the order in which they should appear in the film. Next, the editor's cut is reduced from the rough cut; the editor may be guided by their own choices or following notes from the director or producers. Eventually is the final cut, which actually gets released or broadcast. In between the editor's cut and the final cut can come any number of fine cuts, including the director's cut. The director's cut may include unsatisfactory takes, a preliminary soundtrack, a lack of desired pick-up shots etc., which the director would not like to be shown but uses as a placeholder until satisfactory replacements can be inserted. This is still how the term is used within the film industry, as well as commercials, television, and music videos.

== Inception ==
The trend of releasing alternate cuts of films for artistic reasons became prominent in the 1970s; in 1974, the "director's cut" of The Wild Bunch was shown theatrically in Los Angeles to sold-out audiences. The theatrical release of the film had cut 10 minutes to get an R rating, but this cut was hailed as superior and has now become the definitive one. Other early examples include George Lucas's first two films being re-released following the success of Star Wars, in cuts which more closely resembled his vision, or Peter Bogdanovich re-cutting The Last Picture Show several times. Charlie Chaplin also re-released all of his films in the 1970s, several of which were re-cut. A theatrical re-release of Close Encounters of the Third Kind used the phrase "Special Edition" to describe a cut which was closer to Spielberg's intent but had a compromised ending demanded by the studio.

As the home video industry rose in the early 1980s, video releases of director's cuts were sometimes created for the small but dedicated cult fan market. Los Angeles cable station Z Channel is also cited as significant in the popularization of alternate cuts. Early examples of films released in this manner include Michael Cimino's Heaven's Gate, where a longer cut was recalled from theatres but subsequently shown on cable and eventually released to home video; James Cameron's Aliens, where a video release restored 20 minutes the studio had insisted on cutting; Cameron also voluntarily made cuts to the theatrical version of The Abyss for pacing but restored them for a video release, and most famously, Ridley Scott's Blade Runner, where an alternate workprint version was released to fan acclaim, ultimately resulting in the 1992 recut. Scott later recut the film once more, releasing a version dubbed "The Final Cut" in 2007. This was the final re-cut and the first in which Scott maintained creative control over the final product, leading to The Final Cut being considered the definitive version of the film.

== Criticism ==
Once distributors discovered that consumers would buy alternate versions of films, it became more common for films to have alternative versions released. And the original public meaning of a director's preferred vision has become ignored, leading to so-called "director's cuts" of films where the director prefers the theatrically released version (or when the director had actual final cut privilege in the first place). Such versions are often marketing ploys, assembled by simply restoring deleted scenes, sometimes adding as much as a half-hour to the length of the film without regard to pacing and storytelling.

As a result, the "director's cut" is often considered a misnomer. Some directors deliberately try to avoid labelling alternate versions as such (e.g. Peter Jackson and James Cameron; each using the phrases "Special Edition" or "Extended Edition" for alternate versions of their films).

Sometimes the term is used a marketing ploy. For example, Ridley Scott states on the director's commentary track of Alien that the original theatrical release was his "director's cut", and that the new version was released as a marketing ploy. Director Peter Bogdanovich, no stranger to director's cuts himself, cites Red River as an example where

MGM has a version of Howard Hawks's Red River that they're calling the Director's Cut and it is absolutely not the director's cut. It's a cut the director didn't want, an earlier cut that was junked. They assume because it was longer that it's a director's cut. Capra cut two reels off Lost Horizon because it didn't work and then someone tried to put it back. There are certainly mistakes and stupidities in reconstructing pictures.

Another way that released director's cuts can be compromised is when directors were never allowed to even shoot their vision, and thus when the film is re-cut, they must make do with the footage that exists. Examples of this include Terry Zwigoff's Bad Santa, Brian Helgeland's Payback, and most notably the Richard Donner re-cut of Superman II. Donner completed about 75 per cent of the shooting of the sequel during the shooting of the first one but was fired from the project. His director's cut of the film includes, among other things, screen test footage of stars Christopher Reeve and Margot Kidder, footage used in the first film, and entire scenes that were shot by replacement director Richard Lester which Donner dislikes but were required for story purposes.

On the other side, some critics (such as Roger Ebert) have approved of the use of the label in unsuccessful films that had been tampered with by studio executives, such as Sergio Leone's original cut of Once Upon a Time in America, and the moderately successful theatrical version of Daredevil, which were altered by studio interference for their theatrical release. Other well-received director's cuts include Ridley Scott's Kingdom of Heaven (with Empire magazine stating: "The added 45 minutes in the Director’s Cut are like pieces missing from a beautiful but incomplete puzzle"), or Sam Peckinpah's Pat Garrett and Billy the Kid, where the restored 115-minute cut is closer to the director's intent than the theatrical 105-minute cut (the actual director's cut was 122 minutes; it was never completed to Peckinpah's satisfaction, but was used as a guide for the restoration that was done after his death).

In some instances, such as Peter Weir's Picnic at Hanging Rock, Robert Wise's Star Trek: The Motion Picture, John Cassavetes's The Killing of a Chinese Bookie, Blake Edwards's Darling Lili and Francis Ford Coppola's The Godfather Coda, changes made to a director's cut resulted in a very similar runtime or a shorter, more compact cut. This generally happens when a distributor insists that a film be completed to meet a release date, but sometimes it is the result of removing scenes that the distributor insisted on inserting, as opposed to restoring scenes they insisted on cutting.

== Extended cuts and special editions ==
(See Changes in Star Wars re-releases and E.T. the Extra-Terrestrial: The 20th Anniversary)

Separate to director's cuts are alternate cuts released as "special editions" or "extended cuts". These versions are often put together for home video for fans, and should not be confused with 'director's cuts'. For example, despite releasing extended versions of his The Lord of the Rings trilogy, Peter Jackson told IGN in 2003 that “the theatrical versions are the definitive versions, I regard the extended cuts as being a novelty for the fans that really want to see the extra material.”

"The traditional definition of the term 'Director's Cut' suggests the restoration of a director's original vision, free of any creative limitations. It suggests that the filmmaker has finally overcome the interference of heavy-handed studio executives, and that the film has been restored to its original, untampered form. Such is not the case with Alien: The Director's Cut. It's a completely different beast."

— Ridley Scott

James Cameron has shared similar sentiments regarding the special editions of his films, "What I put into theaters is the Director's Cut. Nothing was cut that I didn't want cut. All the extra scenes we've added back in are just a bonus for the fans." Similar statements were made by Ridley Scott for the 2003 'director's cut' of Alien.

Such alternate versions sometimes include changes to the special effects in addition to different editing, such as George Lucas's Star Wars films, and Steven Spielberg's E.T. the Extra-Terrestrial.

Extended or special editions can also apply to films that have been extended for television or cut out to fill time slots and long advertisement breaks, against the explicit wishes of the director, such as the TV versions of Dune (1984), The Warriors (1979), Superman (1978) and the Harry Potter films.

=== Examples of alternate cuts ===
The Lord of the Rings film series directed by Peter Jackson saw an "Extended Edition" release for each of the three films The Fellowship of the Ring (2001), The Two Towers (2002), and The Return of the King (2003) featuring an additional 30 minutes, 47 minutes and 51 minutes respectively of new scenes, special effects and music alongside fan-club credits. These versions of the films were not Jackson's preferred edit, however, they were simply extended versions for fans to enjoy at home.

Batman v Superman: Dawn of Justice directed by Zack Snyder had an "Ultimate Edition," which added back 31 minutes of footage cut for the theatrical release and received an R rating, released digitally on 28 June 2016, and on Blu-ray on 19 July 2016.

The film Justice League which suffered a very troubled production, was begun by Snyder, who completed a pre-postproduction director's cut but had to step down before completing the project due to his daughter's death. Joss Whedon was hired by the films' distributor Warner Bros. Pictures to complete the film, which was however heavily re-shot, re-edited and released in 2017 with Snyder retaining the directorial credit, to negative reception from general audience, fans and critics alike and a box office failure. Following a global fan campaign to which the director and members of the cast and crew showed support, Snyder was allowed to return and complete the project the way he intended it and a 4-hour version of the film dubbed Zack Snyder's Justice League with some additionally shot scenes at the end was released on March 18, 2021, on HBO Max to more favorable reviews than the original version. Snyder originally teased a 214-minute cut of the film that was supposed to be the theatrical version released in 2017 if he did not step down from the project. Snyder has also confirmed that his Netflix distributed sci-fi film Rebel Moon – Part One: A Child of Fire (2023) and its sequel Rebel Moon – Part Two: The Scargiver (2024) would receive R-rated director's cuts with its new titles Rebel Moon – Chapter One: Chalice of Blood, and the sequel Rebel Moon – Chapter Two: Curse of Forgiveness (both 2024). The PG-13 initial versions of those films having been critically panned.

The film Caligula exists in at least 10 different officially released versions, ranging from a sub-90-minute television edit version of TV-14 (later TV-MA) for cable television to an unrated full pornographic version exceeding 3.5 hours. This is believed to be the largest amount of distinct versions of a single film. Among major studio films, the record is believed to be held by Blade Runner; the magazine Video Watchdog counted no less than seven distinct versions in a 1993 issue, before director Ridley Scott later released a "Final Cut" in 2007 to acclaim from critics including Roger Ebert who included it on his great movies list, The release of Blade Runner: The Final Cut brings the supposed grand total to eight differing versions of Blade Runner.

Upon its release on DVD and Blu-ray in 2019, Fantastic Beasts: The Crimes of Grindelwald featured an extended cut with seven minutes of additional footage. This is the first time since Harry Potter and the Chamber of Secrets that a Wizarding World film has had one.

An animated example of an extended cut without the approval of the director was 1983's Twice Upon a Time, which was extended to have more profanity (supervised by co-writer and producer Bill Couturié) as opposed to co-director John Korty's original.

The Coen Brothers' Blood Simple is one of few examples that demonstrate director's cuts are not necessarily longer.

== Music videos ==
The music video for the 2006 Academy Award-nominated song "Listen", performed by Beyoncé, received a director's cut by Diane Martel. This version of the video was later included on Knowles' B'Day Anthology Video Album (2007). Linkin Park has a director's cut version for their music video "Faint" (directed by Mark Romanek) in which one of the band members spray paints the words "En Proceso" on a wall, as well as Hoobastank also having one for 2004's "The Reason" which omits the woman getting hit by the car. Britney Spears' music video for 2007's "Gimme More" was first released as a director's cut on iTunes, with the official video released 3 days later. Many other director's cut music videos contain sexual content that can't be shown on TV thus creating alternative scenes, such as Thirty Seconds to Mars's "Hurricane", and in some cases, alternative videos, such as in the case of Spears' 2008 video for "Womanizer".

== Expanded usage in pop culture ==
As the trend became more widely recognized, the term director's cut became increasingly used as a colloquialism to refer to an expanded version of other things, including video games, music, and comic books. This confusing usage only served to further reduce the artistic value of a director's cut, and it is currently rarely used in those ways.

=== Video games ===
For video games, these expanded versions, also referred as "complete editions", will have additions to the gameplay or additional game modes and features outside the main portion of the game.

As is the case with certain high-profile Japanese-produced games, the game designers may take the liberty to revise their product for the overseas market with additional features during the localization process. These features are later added back to the native market in a re-release of a game in what is often referred as the international version of the game. This was the case with the overseas versions of Final Fantasy VII, Metal Gear Solid and Rogue Galaxy, which contained additional features (such as new difficulty settings for Metal Gear Solid), resulting in re-released versions of those respective games in Japan (Final Fantasy VII International, Metal Gear Solid: Integral and Rogue Galaxy: Director's Cut). In the case of Metal Gear Solid 2: Sons of Liberty and Metal Gear Solid 3: Snake Eater, the American versions were released first, followed by the Japanese versions and then the European versions, with each regional release offering new content not found in the previous one. All of the added content from the Japanese and European versions of those games were included in the expanded editions titled Metal Gear Solid 2: Substance and Metal Gear Solid 3: Subsistence.

They also, similar to movies, will occasionally include extra, uncensored or alternate versions of cutscenes, as was the case with Resident Evil: Code Veronica X. In markets with strict censorship, a later relaxing of those laws occasional will result in the game being rereleased with the "Special/Uncut Edition" tag added to differentiate between the originally released censored version and the current uncensored edition.

Several of the Pokémon games have also received director's cuts and have used the term "extension", though "remake" and "third version" are also often used by many fans. These include Pocket Monsters: Blue (Japan only), Pokémon Yellow (for Pokémon Red and Green/Blue), Pokémon Crystal (for Pokémon Gold and Silver), Pokémon Emerald (for Pokémon Ruby and Sapphire), Pokémon Platinum (for Pokémon Diamond and Pearl) and Pokémon Ultra Sun and Ultra Moon.

For their PlayStation 5 "Director's Cut" releases of the PlayStation 4 games Ghost of Tsushima and Death Stranding both received expanded features on both games.

=== Music ===
"Director's cuts" in music are rarely released. A few exceptions include Guided by Voices' 1994 album Bee Thousand, which was re-released as a three disc vinyl LP director's cut in 2004, and Fall Out Boy's 2003 album Take This to Your Grave, which was re-released as a Director's cut in 2005 with two extra tracks.

In 2011 British singer Kate Bush released the album titled Director's Cut. It is made up of songs from her earlier albums The Sensual World and The Red Shoes which have been remixed and restructured, three of which were re-recorded completely.

== See also ==
- Artistic integrity
- Cinephilia
- The Criterion Collection
- Fan edit
- Film modification
- Redux
