= Deeper Understanding =

Song by Kate Bush

Song by Kate Bush

from the album The Sensual World
- Released: 16 October 1989
- Genre: Progressive pop
- Length: 4:46
- Label: EMI
- Songwriter: Kate Bush
- Producer: Kate Bush

"Deeper Understanding"

Single by Kate Bush

from the album Director's Cut
- Released: 5 April 2011
- Genre: Art rock
- Length: 6:32
- Label: Fish People, EMI
- Songwriter: Kate Bush
- Producer: Kate Bush

Kate Bush singles chronology
"King of the Mountain" (2005)	"Deeper Understanding" (2011)	"Wild Man" (2011)

Music video
- "Deeper Understanding" on YouTube

Audio sample
- "Deeper Understanding" (2011): file; help

"Deeper Understanding" is a song by English singer-songwriter Kate Bush originally released on her 1989 album The Sensual World. It was re-worked for her 2011 album Director's Cut and released as the album's only single, marking her first single release since 2005. The song's lyrics describe an increasingly intense relationship between a lonely person and a computer.

== Background ==
Kate Bush explained that the song is about how people are replacing human relationships with technology:

"This is about people... well, about the modern situation, where more and more people are having less contact with human beings. We spend all day with machines; all night with machines. You know, all day, you're on the phone, all night you're watching telly. Press a button, this happens. [...] And this is the idea of someone who spends all their time with their computer and, like a lot of people, they spend an obsessive amount of time with their computer. People really build up heavy relationships with their computers!"

== Song information ==
The Director's Cut version of the song is almost two minutes longer than the original recording on The Sensual World, and features re-recorded vocals and a harmonica solo at the end. The later version features the voice of her son, Albert, on the chorus, performing the role of the computer.

For the original recording, the chorus vocals were distorted using a very basic vocoder, and needed backing vocals just to make the words audible. For the Director's Cut version, Bush was able to present it as a solitary computerized voice, as was her original intention. This is not the first time Bush worked with her son; he makes a brief spoken word appearance on her previous album Aerial on Disc 2, "A Sky of Honey".

== Music video ==
A short film to accompany the track premiered on Kate Bush's official YouTube channel on Monday, 25 April 2011. It is directed by Bush herself and stars Robbie Coltrane, Frances Barber, Noel Fielding, and the voice of her son Albert, who plays the role of the computer program. Music website Consequence of Sound reviewed the video and briefly explained it:

The video adapts the song's core plot – a person becoming addicted to a program called Voice Console deeply, emotionally attaching themselves to it to the point of separation with friends and family. Robbie Coltrane, best known for his work in Harry Potter as Hagrid, plays the computer junkie who leaves behind his wife and two sons to escape with the program. In the video, Voice Console is a pair of feminine lips on a screen (Bush's son Albert) with an eerie inhuman blackness behind them [...]. The program spouts hallucinogenic wave forms that cast Coltrane into a state of euphoria. When the family finally steps in to disable the sinister program, Coltrane turns on them and in his withdrawal things get very dark and strange.

== Personnel ==
Credits are adapted from The Sensual World liner notes.

- Kate Bush – vocals, keyboards
- Del Palmer – Fairlight CMI percussion
- Charlie Morgan – drums
- Bill Whelan – arranger ("The Irish sessions")
- Paddy Bush – tupan
- John Giblin – bass guitar
- Michael Nyman – string arrangement (Balanescu Quartet)
- Trio Bulgarka – vocals
- Yanka Rupkina (of Trio Bulgarka) – solo vocalist
- Dimitar Penev – arranger (Trio Bulgarka)

== Release ==
The song premiered on BBC Radio 2 on Monday 4 April 2011 on The Ken Bruce Show and was made available for streaming on Kate Bush's official YouTube channel after the radio premiere. "Deeper Understanding" was released as a digital download single on Tuesday 5 April. The song was the Record of the Week on Radio 2 and was played each day Bruce's show and Alex Lester's programme.

== Charts ==
Chart (2011)	Peak position
French Singles Chart	92
UK Singles Chart	87
