= The Fir-Tree =

- Short story by Hans Christian Andersen
- Original title: Grantræet
- Country: Denmark
- Language: Danish
- Genre: Literary fairy tale

Publication
- Published in: New Fairy Tales. First Volume. Second Collection (Nye Eventyr. Første Bind. Anden Samling)
- Publication type: Fairy tale collection
- Publisher: C.A. Reitzel
- Media type: Print
- Publication date: 21 December 1844

Chronology
| — | The Snow Queen: A Fairy Tale in Seven Stories |

"The Fir-Tree" (Danish: Grantræet) is a literary fairy tale by the Danish poet and author Hans Christian Andersen (1805–1875). The tale is about a fir tree so anxious to grow up, so anxious for greater things, that he cannot appreciate living in the moment. The tale was first published 21 December 1844 with "The Snow Queen", in New Fairy Tales. First Volume. Second Collection, in Copenhagen, Denmark, by C.A. Reitzel. Andersen biographer Jackie Wullschlager suggests that "The Fir-Tree" was the first of Andersen's fairy tales to express a deep pessimism.

== Adaptations ==
The tale was adapted to a 28-minute video format in 1979 by Huntingwood Films produced by Kevin Sullivan, directed by Martin Hunter and filmed at Black Creek Pioneer Village, Toronto, Ontario, Canada. Jeff Kahnert provided the voice of the Fir-Tree. This was the first film produced by Kevin Sullivan who went on to write, direct and produce the Anne of Green Gables movies.

It was adapted as the sixteenth episode of The Fairytaler.

In 2011, the story was again adapted as a short, Danish-language film directed by Lars Henrik Ostenfeld and presented in a modern setting. The story follows the tree from cone through seedling, until it is cut down by a boy and his father to be used as a Christmas tree. Unlike Andersen's tale, which ends with the burning of the tree, the film shows a cone from the tree surviving the fire and being thrown into the forest, perhaps to grow into another fir tree.

== See also ==
- List of works by Hans Christian Andersen
- List of Christmas-themed literature
