= Eat the Music =

Single by Kate Bush

from the album The Red Shoes
- B-side: "Eat the Music" (12" mix); "Big Stripey Lie"; "Candle in the Wind"; "You Want Alchemy"; "Shoedance" (The Red Shoes dance mix)
- Released: 7 September 1993; 30 May 1994 (Australia)
- Studio: Abbey Road Studios (London, England)
- Genre: Baila
- Length: 4:55; 9:19 (12" version)
- Label: Columbia (US)
- Songwriter: Kate Bush
- Producer: Kate Bush

Kate Bush singles chronology
| "Rubberband Girl" (1993) | "Eat the Music" (1993) | "Moments of Pleasure" (1993) |

Music video
- "Eat the Music" on YouTube

"Eat the Music" is a song written and recorded by British singer-songwriter Kate Bush. Columbia Records released it as the lead single from Bush's seventh album, The Red Shoes (1993), in the United States, while EMI chose "Rubberband Girl" everywhere else in the world.

In the United Kingdom, a handful of 7" and promotional CD-singles were produced, but were recalled by EMI Records at the last minute. A commercial release followed in 1994 in the Netherlands and Australia, and a number of other countries. The single reached #10 in the US Modern Rock Tracks chart.

Tricky included the song on his edition of the mix album series Back to Mine.

== Background and release ==
Bush commented on the song, saying, "'Eat the Music' was inspired by Madagascan music which I was fortunate enough to hear through Paddy, who gave me some tapes that I loved listening to. The music is so joyous and full of sunshine and it's good to drive to. Justin Vali came to Paddy's attention and soon after, they were both playing valihas to a specially written 'Madagascan' song. I wanted it to feel joyous and sunny, both qualities are rife in Justin as a person – so I just had to provide the fruit I hope the result is a colourful one. Again, this was a lot of fun to work on and it features Justin's first lines of sung English which he found hilarious. We found both his singing and his reaction to it delightful." Speaking of the song's lyrics, Bush told Melody Maker in 1993, "It's playing with the idea of opening people up, and the idea of the hidden femininity in a man, and the man in a woman."

For the week dated 17 September 1993, Radio & Records reported that "Eat the Music" was the most added song to radio stations within the new rock format. The following month, the song reached its peak position of No. 10 on the Billboard Modern Rock Tracks chart. In April 2024, "Eat the Music" was re-released as a 10" vinyl record as part of that year's Record Store Day.

== Critical reception ==
Chris Roberts from Melody Maker felt that the song was "misguided", "all ghastly, Lilt-supping, Notting Hill Carnival calypso". Terry Staunton from NME declared it as "a shopping list of exotic fruit, as if Kate is pulling Carmen Miranda's hat apart looking for metaphors for love." Parry Gettelman from Orlando Sentinel wrote, "The bizarre fruit metaphors on 'Eat the Music' are exceedingly pretentious, but the song has a lilting, African high-life feel."

== Track listings ==
All tracks are written by Kate Bush, except where noted.

CD single (France)
| No. | Title | Length |
|---|---|---|
| 1. | "Eat the Music" (radio edit) | 3:25 |

CD single (US)
| No. | Title | Writer(s) | Length |
|---|---|---|---|
| 1. | "Eat the Music" | | 4:55 |
| 2. | "Eat the Music" (12" version) | | 9:19 |
| 3. | "Big Stripey Lie" | | 3:32 |
| 4. | "Candle in the Wind" | Elton John; Bernie Taupin | 4:26 |

Cassette single (US)
| No. | Title | Writer(s) | Length |
|---|---|---|---|
| 1. | "Eat the Music" | | 4:55 |
| 2. | "Eat the Music" (12" version) | | 9:19 |
| 3. | "Big Stripey Lie" | | 3:32 |
| 4. | "Candle in the Wind" | John; Taupin | 4:26 |

CD single (non-US)
| No. | Title | Length |
|---|---|---|
| 1. | "Eat the Music" | 5:10 |
| 2. | "Eat the Music" (extended mix) | 4:58 |
| 3. | "You Want Alchemy" | 4:22 |
| 4. | "Shoedance" (The Red Shoes dance mix) | 10:05 |

10" vinyl single for Record Store Day (2024)
| No. | Title | Length |
|---|---|---|
| 1. | "Eat the Music" |
| 2. | "Lily" |
| 3. | "Big Stripey Lie" |

== Personnel ==
- Kate Bush – vocals, keyboards
- Paddy Bush – vocals
- Stuart Elliott – drums, percussion
- John Giblin – bass guitar
- Justin Vali – valiha, kabosy, vocals
- Nigel Hitchcock – tenor saxophone
- Neil Sidwell – trombone
- Steve Sidwell – trumpet
- Paul Spong – trumpet

== Charts ==
| Chart (1993) | Peak position |
|---|---|
| UK Airplay (ERA) | 49 |
| US Alternative Airplay (Billboard) | 10 |
| US Dance Singles Sales (Billboard) | 31 |

| Chart (1994) | Peak position |
|---|---|
| Australia (ARIA) | 133 |

| Chart (2024) | Peak position |
|---|---|
| UK Singles Sales (OCC) | 2 |
