= The Red Shoes (fairy tale) =

1845 story by Hans Christian Andersen

- Short story by Hans Christian Andersen
- Illustration by Vilhelm Pedersen
- Original title: De røde sko
- Country: Denmark
- Language: Danish
- Genre: Literary fairy tale

Publication
- Published in: New Fairy Tales. First Volume. Third Collection (Nye Eventyr. Første Bind. Tredie Samling)
- Publication type: Fairy tale collection
- Publisher: C. A. Reitzel
- Media type: Print
- Publication date: 7 April 1845

"The Red Shoes" (Danish: De røde sko) is a literary fairy tale by Danish poet and author Hans Christian Andersen first published by C.A. Reitzel in Copenhagen 7 April 1845 in New Fairy Tales. First Volume. Third Collection (Nye Eventyr. Første Bind. Tredie Samling). Other tales in the volume include "The Elf Mound" (Elverhøi), "The Jumpers" (Springfyrene), "The Shepherdess and the Chimney Sweep" (Hyrdinden og Skorstensfejeren), and "Holger Danske" (Holger Danske).

The tale was republished 18 December 1849 as a part of Fairy Tales. 1850. (Eventyr. 1850.) and again on 30 March 1863 as a part of Fairy Tales and Stories. Second Volume. 1863. (Eventyr og Historier. Andet Bind. 1863.). The story is about a girl forced to dance continually in her red shoes. "The Red Shoes" has seen adaptations in various media including film.

== Plot summary ==
After her mother's death, a peasant girl named Karen is adopted while still very young by a rich old lady and grows up vain and spoiled. Before her adoption, Karen had a roughly-made pair of red shoes; afterward, she has her adoptive mother buy her a pair of red shoes fit for a princess. Karen is so enamored of her new shoes that she wears them to church even though the old lady tells her, "This is highly improper: you must only wear black shoes in church". The following Sunday, Karen is unable to resist putting the red shoes on again. As she is about to enter the church, she meets a mysterious old soldier with a red beard. "Oh, what beautiful shoes for dancing," the soldier says. "Never come off when you dance," he tells the shoes, and he taps each of the shoes with his hand. After church, Karen cannot resist taking a few dance steps, and off she goes, as though the shoes controlled her, but she manages to stop after a few minutes.

After her adoptive mother becomes ill and dies, Karen doesn't attend her funeral, choosing to go to a dance instead. Once again, the red shoes take control; this time, she is unable to stop dancing. An angel appears to her, bearing a sword, and condemns her to dance even after she dies, as a warning to vain children everywhere. Karen begs for mercy, but the red shoes take her away before she hears the angel's reply.

Karen finds an executioner and asks him to chop off her feet. He does so; however, the shoes continue to dance, even with Karen's amputated feet inside them. The executioner gives her a pair of wooden feet and crutches. Thinking that she has suffered enough for the red shoes, Karen decides to go to church so people can see her. Yet her amputated feet, still wearing the red shoes, dance before her, barring the way. The following Sunday she tries again, thinking she is at least as good as the others in church. Once again, the dancing red shoes bar the way.

When Sunday comes again, Karen does not dare go to church. Instead, she sits alone at home and prays to God for help. The angel reappears, now bearing a spray of roses, and gives Karen the mercy she asked for. Her room turns into the church, and sunshine streams through the window. Her heart becomes so filled with peace, joy and sunshine that it bursts. Her soul flies on the sunshine to Heaven, where no one mentions the red shoes.

== Background ==
Andersen named the story's anti-heroine Karen after his own loathed half-sister, Karen Marie Andersen. The story is based on an incident Andersen witnessed as a small child. His father, who was a shoemaker, was sent a piece of red silk by a rich lady to make a pair of dancing slippers for her own daughter. Using some valuable red leather along with the silk, he carefully created a pair of shoes only for the rich customer to tell him they were awful. She said he had 'done nothing but spoil [her] silk'. To which his father replied, "In that case, I may as well spoil my leather too," and he cut up the shoes in front of her.

== Adaptations ==
- The Red Shoes is a 1948 British feature film about ballet based on the fairy tale.
- While living in Denmark in 1965, American jazz saxophonist Sahib Shihab composed the score to a jazz ballet based on Andersen's story.
- Tale Spinners for Children adapted the story as an audio drama (United Artist Records 11063), changing some details of the story: Karen takes dancing lessons and schemes to be given the lead role in a recital before the Queen, rehearsing even though her benefactress has become gravely ill. Choosing to dance at the recital as her benefactress dies, the red dancing shoes made especially for her become permanently attached to her feet, and she is condemned to dance until she truly repents. Unlike the original story, in which her feet are amputated, Karen merely continues to dance until she is unable to even walk.
- The Red Shoes, HBO Storybook Musicals episode, Narrated by Ossie Davis, February 7, 1990
- The Red Shoes, a 1993 musical with a book by Marsha Norman, lyrics by Norman and Bob Merrill (credited as Paul Stryker) and music by Jule Styne.
- The Red Shoes was adapted as a ballet by the choreographer Matthew Bourne, based on the 1948 film and premiered at Sadler's Wells Theatre London in December 2016.
- Red Shoes is an abnormality in the 2018 game Lobotomy Corporation where it was named after the tale. It also appears in other games by the same developer, notably Limbus Company
- Red Shoes is a character in the 2022 game Goddess of Victory: Nikke where she was named after the tale. She is an antagonist in the Old Tales event, released for the game's second anniversary in 2024.
- British singer-songwriter Kate Bush's seventh album, The Red Shoes, was named after Powell and Pressburger's film and Andersen's fairy tale the film is based on.
- 'De rode schoentjes' is an attraction in Dutch theme park the Efteling located inside the Fairytale Forest.
- The Red Shoes, a South Korean horror film inspired by the fairy tale.
- The Red Shoes is a 2013 novel by John Stewart Wynne. It is a re-visioning of the story, set in contemporary New York City.
- The Red Shoes, a new version by Nancy Harris with music by Marc Teitler, premiered at the Gate Theatre, Dublin in 2017 for the Christmas season, directed by Selina Cartmell. The play was revised for the Royal Shakespeare Company and opened at the Swan Theatre, Stratford-upon-Avon for the 2024 Christmas season, directed by Kimberley Rampersad.
- "The Red Shoes" is a flamenco fairytale - a flamenco music and dance adaptation by A'lante Dance Ensemble choreographed by Olivia Chacon
- The second episode of the 2020 South Korean drama It's Okay to Not Be Okay is titled "The Lady in Red Shoes," referencing the fairy tale.

== See also ==
- List of works by Hans Christian Andersen
