= Yanka Rupkina =

Folk singer from Bulgaria

Yanka Rupkina Янка Рупкина
- Born: Yanka Atanasova Rupkina; August 15, 1938; Bogdanovo, Burgas Province, Bulgaria
- Died: April 7, 2026 (aged 87)
- Genres: Balkan folk; Bulgarian folk
- Occupation: Singer
- Years active: 1960–2026
- Labels: Balkanton, 4AD, Hannibal Records, Disques Cellier, Dark Horse Records, World Connection

Yanka Rupkina was a Bulgarian folk singer from the Strandzha region, a soloist for the choir the Mystery of Bulgarian Voices and a member of the ensemble Trio Bulgarka. She contributed to Kate Bush's albums The Sensual World and The Red Shoes, and collaborated with Linda Ronstadt, Prince, and Positive Black Soul. Her recorded repertoire includes the songs "Kalimanku Denku" and "Djore Dos".

== Early life ==
Yanka Rupkina was born on August 15, 1938, though her official records list her birth date as August 25 due to her mother's difficult labour and prolonged recovery following the birth. Growing up in the village of Bogdanovo in Burgas, Bulgaria, in the Strandzha Mountains, she learned traditional singing from her family. She initially pursued a career path in medicine, graduating from a nursing college in 1954. At age 22 she won a first prize at a folklore festival in the village of Gramatikovo. This performance was a turning point after her voice caught the attention of experts from the Bulgarian National Radio.

== Career ==
Shortly after, she moved to Sofia to join the Folk Song Ensemble of the Bulgarian National Radio. She served as a lead soloist of the ensemble The Mystery of Bulgarian Voices, for over 30 years, recording hundreds of songs from the Strandzha region.

On December 21, 1971, Rupkina survived the crash of Balkan Bulgarian Airlines Flight 130 at Sofia Airport, which took the lives of 30 people, including the Bulgarian singer Pasha Hristova. Rupkina, who was sitting near the back, sustained burns but credited the experience with giving her a "second life" dedicated to music.

=== Trio Bulgarka ===
In the late 1970s, Rupkina co-founded the vocal ensemble Trio Bulgarka with soloists Eva Georgieva (Dobrudzha) and Stoyanka Boneva (Pirin). The trio gained prominence through their inclusion in the 1975 world music compilation "Balkana: The Music of Bulgaria", released through Hannibal Records. In 1988, the ensemble released their studio album, "The Forest Is Crying", produced by Joe Boyd. The album received rotations on radio stations such as BBC Radio 1 and BBC Radio 2.

As members of the larger Bulgarian State Television Female Vocal Choir, they participated in the album Le Mystère des Voix Bulgares, which won a Grammy Award in 1990 for Best Traditional Folk Recording.

=== Collaborations with Kate Bush ===
They were featured on two of Kate Bush's albums - The Sensual World with the songs "Rocket's Tail" and "Deeper Understanding", and The Red Shoes with the songs "The Song of Solomon" and "Why Should I Love You?" (which also featured Prince). Bush is credited saying - "Working with the Trio Bulgarka was thrilling. Their voices were so powerful - when they sang you could feel the air cracking." During the recording of "Rocket's Tail" Yanka Rupkina improvised a solo that Bush later highlighted as a moment of pure "meaningful communication" that transcended their language barrier. Bush noted that Rupkina's ability to create a "rocket-like noise and explosion" with just her voice was exactly the "extraordinary" element the song needed.

The Trio appeared on international TV networks, like Sunday Night (NBC, US) - in 1988 they performed a set on the music show hosted by Jools Holland and David Sanborn.

George Harrison from the Beatles was an admirer of Trio Bulgarka, visiting their concerts. Harrison first encountered Bulgarian music through the 1975's album Le Mystère des Voix Bulgares and eventually hosted the trio—consisting of Yanka Rupkina, Eva Georgieva, and Stoyanka Boneva—for a private performance at his estate, Friar Park.

=== Career after Trio Bulgarka ===
The group was most active until the late 1990s. While they never had a "farewell" breakup, the trio effectively disbanded in 1999. Following the death of Eva Georgieva in 2004, Rupkina continued to tour and record internationally. Her voice is featured in the movie Lara Croft: Tomb Raider and its soundtrack song "Song of Life" by Leftfield. In 2005, she released the solo album "Keranka" which featured collaborations with Linda Ronstadt and the Senegalese group Positive Black Soul. Rupkina also worked with the British ethno-techno group Transglobal Underground, Leftfield, Denez Prigent, the kaval player Theodosii Spassov. Her performance of "Kalimanku, Denku" was selected to be played at the wedding of David Bowie to Iman.

In her last years, she focused on teaching younger generations of folk singers. She received the Order of Saints Cyril and Methodius (2012) and was named an Honorary Citizen of Burgas in 2017. Rupkina died on April 7, 2026, at the age of 87.
