= The Red Shoes (musical) =

1993 Broadway production

- Original Playbill
- Music: Jule Styne
- Lyrics: Marsha Norman; Bob Merrill
- Book: Marsha Norman
- Basis: 1948 Film The Red Shoes
- Productions: 1993 Broadway

The Red Shoes is a musical with a book by Marsha Norman, lyrics by Norman and Bob Merrill (credited as Paul Stryker) and music by Jule Styne. Based on Powell and Pressburger's 1948 film, it tells the tale of a young ballerina who performs in an adaptation of the 1845 Hans Christian Andersen story.

== History ==
Prior to the Broadway opening, the producer, Martin Starger, fired the original director, the male lead, featured performers, and the production manager. This resulted in a delay of the opening from December 2 to December 16. Starger, Styne and the eventual director, Stanley Donen, wanted the musical to essentially be a stage version of the 1948 film. However, the original director, Susan H. Schulman, Norman, choreographer Lar Lubovitch, and set designer Heidi Landesman felt that to follow the film closely would produce a "dull, dated show." Bob Merrill was brought in to assist in re-writing the lyrics. Norman had no desire to be credited for revised lyrics she didn't write, while Merrill felt the same way about the original lyrics he didn't write; the result was the show's lyrics were credited to Norman and the pseudonymous "Paul Stryker". The Broadway production, in 1993, was a failure, losing nearly $8 million.

== Synopsis ==
In 1921-1922 the Russian Ballet Lermontov company performs in London, Paris and Monte Carlo. Victoria Page is a ballet dancer with the company, which is led by Boris Lermontov. Julian Craster is an idealistic but egocentric young composer, who is in love with Victoria. Lermontov is a middle-aged impresario who wants to control Victoria, both on-stage and off. She is torn between the two men and her desire to dance, and ultimately commits suicide.

== Production ==
The Broadway production opened at the George Gershwin Theatre on December 16, 1993 and closed on December 19, 1993 after 51 previews and five performances. Directed by Stanley Donen and choreographed by Lar Lubovitch, the cast included Margaret Illmann as ballerina Victoria Page, Steve Barton (who replaced Roger Rees during previews) as Svengali-like Boris Lermontov, and Hugh Panaro as Julian Craster, as well as George de la Peña, and Leslie Browne in supporting roles. Lighting design by Ken Billington.

== Song list ==
Act I

- Swan Lake
- I Make the Rules
- The Audition
- Corps de Ballet
- When It Happens to You
- Top of the Sky
- Ballet Montage
- It's a Fairy Tale
- Be Somewhere
- The Rag
- Am I to Wish Her Love

Act II

- Do Svedanaya
- Come Home
- When You Dance for a King
- The Ballet of the Red Shoes

== Reception ==
The musical received "uniform, stake-in-the-heart" negative reviews, and lost nearly $8 million. John Simon, reviewing for New York magazine wrote that there were two good things about the musical; one was Margaret Illmann, who was a "marvellous dancer", although she could not sing. The other was the scenery of Heidi Landesman, who designed "inspired re-creations of known locales or inventions of unknown ones." Simon also noted that the "Red Shoes Ballet" "was still fun; it was here that Jule Styne's music, surprisingly, came to life and Lubovitch's choreography, obviously, became most unfettered."

== Awards and nominations ==
- Drama Desk Award for Outstanding Actress in a Musical (Illmann, nominee)
- Drama Desk Award for Outstanding Supporting Actor in a Musical (De la Peña, nominee)
- Theatre World Award (Illmann, winner)
