= The Glory of Gershwin =

Studio album by Larry Adler and others
- Released: 1994
- Length: 77:54
- Label: Mercury
- Producer: George Martin

Singles from The Glory of Gershwin
- 1. "The Man I Love / Rhapsody in Blue" Released: 18 July 1994; 2. "It Ain't Necessarily So / I'll Build a Stairway to Paradise / The Gettysburgh Address" Released: 1994

Professional ratings
Review scores
| Source | Rating |
|---|---|
| AllMusic | 1.5/5 stars |

The Glory of Gershwin is a 1994 tribute album by various singers and performers in celebration of American musician Larry Adler's 80th birthday. Adler himself plays the harmonica on each of the songs, all of which are written by Adler's lifelong friends, George and Ira Gershwin, except where collaborators were involved and are indicated. The album cover is a pastiche of Pablo Picasso's Three Musicians painting.

Produced by George Martin, the album peaked for three weeks at second place on the UK Albums Chart. The song "The Man I Love", featuring Kate Bush, was released as a single and reached number 27 on the UK Singles Chart.

== Track listing ==
The Glory of Gershwin track listing
| No. | Title | Performed by | Length |
|---|---|---|---|
| 1. | "Summertime" (DuBose and Dorothy Heyward) | Peter Gabriel | 3:50 |
| 2. | "Do What You Do" (Gus Kahn) | Chris de Burgh | 3:36 |
| 3. | "Nice Work If You Can Get It" | Sting | 3:02 |
| 4. | "They Can't Take That Away from Me" | Lisa Stansfield | 3:17 |
| 5. | "Someone to Watch Over Me" / "Love Is Here to Stay" | Elton John | 6:41 |
| 6. | "I've Got a Crush on You" | Carly Simon | 3:36 |
| 7. | "But Not for Me" | Elvis Costello | 5:04 |
| 8. | "It Ain't Necessarily So" (DuBose and Dorothy Heyward) | Cher | 4:12 |
| 9. | "The Man I Love" | Kate Bush | 3:20 |
| 10. | "How Long Has This Been Going On?" | Jon Bon Jovi featuring Richie Sambora | 5:07 |
| 11. | "Embraceable You" | Oleta Adams | 3:55 |
| 12. | "Bidin' My Time" | Willard White | 3:31 |
| 13. | "My Man's Gone Now" (DuBose and Dorothy Heyward) | Sinéad O'Connor | 3:38 |
| 14. | "I Got Rhythm" | Robert Palmer | 3:55 |
| 15. | "Somebody Loves Me" (Ballard MacDonald and Buddy DeSylva) | Meat Loaf | 4:15 |
| 16. | "I'll Build a Stairway to Paradise" (Arthur Francis et Buddy DeSylva) | Issy Van Randwyck | 4:33 |
| 17. | "Summertime" (DuBose and Dorothy Heyward) | Courtney Pine | 4:01 |
| 18. | "Rhapsody in Blue" (instrumental) | Larry Adler & George Martin | 8:28 |

- The US version does not include the tracks by Chris de Burgh and Willard White.

== Charts ==
Chart performance for The Glory of Gershwin
| Chart (1994) | Peak position | Weeks on chart |
|---|---|---|
| Australian Albums (ARIA) | 7 | 13 |
| German Albums (Offizielle Top 100) | 66 | 5 |
| New Zealand Albums (RMNZ) | 6 | 18 |
| UK Albums Chart | 2 | 22 |

== Certifications ==
Certifications for The Glory of Gershwin
| Region | Certification | Certified units/sales |
|---|---|---|
| United Kingdom (BPI) | Gold | 100,000^{^} |
^{^} Shipments figures based on certification alone.
