= New Fairy Tales. First Volume =

Fairy tales by Hans Christian Andersen

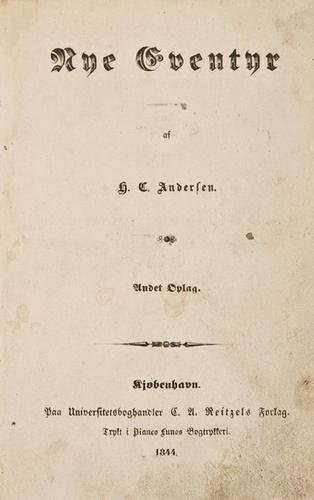
- Title page of the first edition of Nye Eventyr.
- Author: Hans Christian Andersen
- Original title: Nye Eventyr. Første Bind
- Language: Danish
- Genre: Literary fairy tale collection
- Publisher: C. A. Reitzel
- Publication date: 11 November 1843 – 7 April 1845
- Publication place: Denmark
- Media type: Print

New Fairy Tales. First Volume (Danish: Nye Eventyr. Første Bind) is a collection of nine fairy tales by Hans Christian Andersen. The tales were published in a series of three installments by C. A. Reitzel in Copenhagen, Denmark between November 1843 and April 1845.

== Contents ==
=== New Fairy Tales. First Volume. First Collection ===
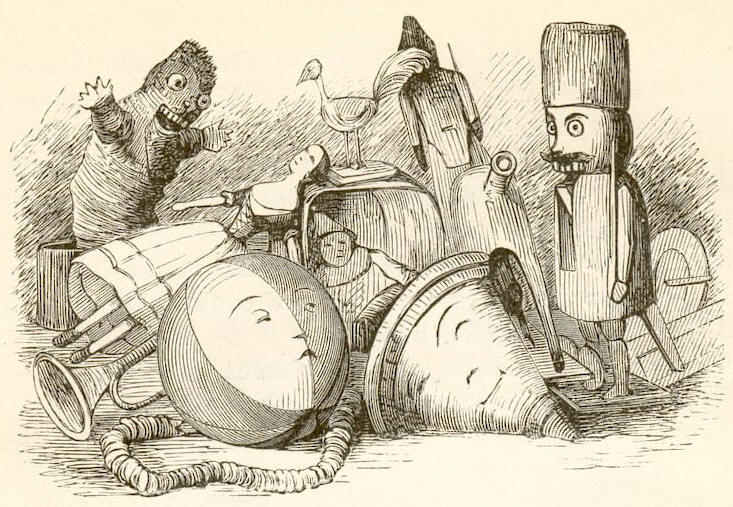
Illustration (1850) by Vilhelm Pedersen, Andersen's first illustrator

New Fairy Tales. First Volume. First Collection (Nye Eventyr. Første Bind. Første Samling) is the first installment. Was published on 11 November 1843 (as was customary at the time however, the title page is dated 1844) and contained four tales:

- "The Angel" ("Engelen") tells of a dead child and an angel gathering flowers for Heaven. In a poverty-ridden section of the city, the angel retrieves a lily from a trash heap and explains the flower had cheered a dying child. The angel reveals he was that child. Andersen had been attracted to the sentimental 'dying child' theme since composing the poem, "The Dying Child", during his school days, but the immediate catalyst was probably the death of the daughter of Edvard Collin, Andersen's close friend and lifelong homoerotic obsession. The tale suited the taste of the times and was wildly popular. The angel and child were depicted in a print that sold millions of copies.
- "The Nightingale" ("Nattergalen"), the Emperor of China enjoys the songs of both a real nightingale and a mechanical bird. When the mechanical bird breaks down and the Emperor is close to death, the real nightingale's song restores his health. The tale's Chinese setting was inspired by the then recently opened Tivoli Gardens in Copenhagen, and memorializes Andersen's unrequited love for singer Jenny Lind. The tale was completed in 24 hours on 12 October 1843. "The Nightingale" sets out in fairy tale form, Andersen's artistic manifesto: naturalness and simplicity triumphing over artifice and reason. The tale is a variation on his earlier "The Swineherd".
- "The Sweethearts; or, The Top and the Ball" ("Kjærestefolkene [Toppen og bolden]") tells of the unrequited love suffered by a mahogany top for a leather ball. When the top discovers the ball years later lying in the dustbin faded and dirty, he refuses to recognize her. The tale is likely based on Andersen's youthful passion for lovely Riborg Voight, a woman who refused his marriage proposal in 1830. He met her again in 1843 when she had become a frumpy, middle-aged matron. The tale is sometimes viewed as a counterpiece to "The Nightingale" in its ushering out of an old love (Voight) and the welcoming in of a new one (Lind).
- "The Ugly Duckling" ("Den grimme ælling"), an awkward and ungainly bird, is ostracized by his barnyard fellows and wanders alone and unhappy until, to everyone's surprise, he matures into a swan, the loveliest bird of all. Andersen spent more than a year writing the tale, and, at one time, said The Ugly Duckling was his autobiography. The tale celebrates the cherished romantic view of genius over background and culture – "it doesn't matter being born in a duckyard if you're hatched from a swan's egg!" Of Andersen's many tales of transformation, "The Ugly Duckling" has gained the greatest universal appeal. Thirty years after its publication, the Spectator wrote that the tale was – like Solomon's proverbs – "in everyone's mouth" and the tale was one of those "happy arrows that hit the bull's eye."

All the tales are Andersen's invention and the collection is the most autobiographical of his many works in the fairy tale genre. Andersen himself is the several heroes and heroines in the collection's tales – the awkward duckling, the nightingale, the gilded top.

=== New Fairy Tales. First Volume. Second Collection ===
New Fairy Tales. First Volume. Second Collection (Nye Eventyr. Første Bind. Anden Samling) is the second installment. Was published on 21 December 1844 and contained two tales:

- "The Fir-Tree" ("Grantræet")
- "The Snow Queen" ("Snedronningen")

=== New Fairy Tales. First Volume. Third Collection ===
New Fairy Tales. First Volume. Third Collection (Nye Eventyr. Første Bind. Tredie Samling) is the third and last installment. Was published on 7 April 1845 and contained five tales:

- "The Elf Mound" ("Elverhøi")
- "The Red Shoes" ("De røde Skoe")
- "The Jumpers" ("Springfyrene")
- "The Shepherdess and the Chimney Sweep" ("Hyrdinden og Skorstensfejeren")
- "Holger Danske" Der ka agie Robiual

== Themes ==
The prevailing theme of the first installment is that of transformation and it is worked as social comedy, religious awakening, and artistic revelation. The collection is the most optimistic in Andersen's output since his fairy tale debut in 1835 but unlike the breezy, bouncy tone of the early tales, these four speak to adult fulfillment, of pain transformed to pleasure via suffering and understanding.

== Critical reception ==
The first installment was received enthusiastically by the Danish critics and public and was a break-through for Andersen who, until its publication, had generally received vigorous condemnation from the Danish critics for his venture into the fairy tale genre. Reviews for the collection however were ecstatic. Ny Portefeuille wrote, "There is in these tales so much beauty and goodness, so much humour and seriousness, so much poetry and depth, that even the most disparate readers will by necessity find something of interest to them." Andersen wrote his confidante Henriette Wulff, "These tales have been received with unanimous applause. None of my other books have had such a success here at home, every paper commends them, everyone reads them [...] I am appreciated as the best fairy-tale teller."
