= The Red Shoes (1948 film) =

1948 film by Michael Powell and Emeric Pressburger

- Theatrical release poster
- Directed by: Michael Powell; Emeric Pressburger
- Screenplay by: Michael Powell; Emeric Pressburger
- Based on: "The Red Shoes" (1845 fairy tale) by Hans Christian Andersen
- Produced by: Michael Powell; Emeric Pressburger
- Starring: Anton Walbrook; Marius Goring; Moira Shearer; Léonide Massine; Robert Helpmann; Albert Bassermann; Esmond Knight; Ludmilla Tchérina
- Cinematography: Jack Cardiff
- Edited by: Reginald Mills
- Music by: Brian Easdale
- Production company: The Archers
- Distributed by: General Film Distributors
- Release date: 22 July 1948
- Running time: 134 minutes
- Country: United Kingdom
- Languages: English; French
- Budget: > £505,600 (Note: Sources vary for the final production budget of The Red Shoes: Biographers Mark Connelly and Kevin Macdonald both state the total as £551,927 (equivalent to £24.55 million or US$31.38 million in 2024), though historian Sarah Street provides a lower figure of £505,581 (equivalent to £22.49 million or US$28.74 million in 2024).)
- Box office: US$5 million (U.S. and Canada rentals)

The Red Shoes is a 1948 British dance drama film written, produced and directed by the duo of Michael Powell and Emeric Pressburger. It follows Victoria Page (Moira Shearer), an aspiring ballerina who joins the world-renowned Ballet Lermontov, owned and operated by Boris Lermontov (Anton Walbrook), who tests her dedication to ballet by making her choose between her career and her romance with composer Julian Craster (Marius Goring). It marked the feature film debut of Shearer, an established ballerina, and also features Robert Helpmann, Léonide Massine, and Ludmilla Tchérina, other renowned dancers from the ballet world. The metafictional plot is based on the 1845 fairytale by Hans Christian Andersen, and features a ballet within it by the same title, also adapted from the Andersen work.

The Red Shoes was filmmaking team Powell and Pressburger's tenth collaboration and follow-up to 1947's Black Narcissus. It had been conceived by Powell and producer Alexander Korda in the 1930s, from whom the duo purchased the rights in 1946. Most of the cast were professional dancers. Filming of The Red Shoes took place in mid-1946, primarily in France and England.

Upon release, The Red Shoes received critical acclaim, especially in the United States, where it received a total of five Academy Award nominations, including a win for Best Original Score and Best Art Direction. It also won the Golden Globe Award for Best Original Score and was named one of the Top 10 Films of the Year by the National Board of Review. Despite this, some dance critics gave the film unfavourable reviews as they felt its fantastical, impressionistic centrepiece sequence, influenced by German expressionist cinema of the 1920s, depicted ballet in an unrealistic manner. The film proved a major financial success and was the first British film in history to gross over $5 million in theatrical rentals in the United States.

Retrospectively, The Red Shoes is regarded as one of the best films of Powell and Pressburger's partnership and one of the greatest films of all time. It was voted the ninth greatest British film of all time by the British Film Institute in 1999. The film underwent an extensive digital restoration beginning in 2006 at the UCLA Film and Television Archive to correct significant damage to the original negatives. The restored version of the film screened at the 2009 Cannes Film Festival and was subsequently issued on Blu-ray by The Criterion Collection. In 2017, a poll of 150 actors, directors, writers, producers, and critics for Time Out magazine saw it ranked the fifth best British film ever.

== Plot ==
London music student Julian Craster attends a performance of the ballet Heart of Fire, performed by the eminent travelling ballet company Ballet Lermontov and scored by his professor. Also present are young dancer Victoria 'Vicky' Page and her aunt Lady Neston. Julian furiously walks out after recognising that the professor has plagiarised his compositions.

Lady Neston hosts an after-party in honour of the Ballet Lermontov's impresario, Boris Lermontov. After Vicky tells Boris that dancing is the most important thing in her life, Boris invites her to spend time with his ballet before it leaves for Paris. He hires Vicky full-time after watching her dance the lead in Swan Lake with Ballet Rambert at the Mercury Theatre.

Julian angrily writes a letter to Boris exposing his professor's misconduct. He has a change of heart and visits Boris to take the letter back, but Boris has already read it and is sympathetic. Boris hires Julian as a répétiteur and assistant to the company's conductor. He soon grows impressed with Julian's artistic ambition.

In Paris, Ballet Lermontov's principal dancer Irina Boronskaya is required to leave the company upon getting married, per company policy. Although Boris's official rationale is that love distracts from artistic excellence, the film also reveals that he takes his coworkers' emotional lives (which he lacks) as a personal slight, due to his jealousy of their happiness.

The company proceeds to Monaco. In Irina's absence, Boris casts Vicky as the lead in a new ballet, The Ballet of the Red Shoes (based on the Andersen fairytale), and hires Julian to score it. In the ballet, a dancer acquires a pair of red ballet shoes which enable her to dance with superhuman skill, but at a price: she can never stop dancing until she dies. During rehearsals, Julian and Vicky's ambition and pride lead them to clash at first—to Boris's glee. However, they develop respect for each other as artists.

The Ballet of the Red Shoes is a resounding success. Boris revitalises the company's repertoire with Vicky as the prima ballerina and Julian as the star composer. In the meantime, Vicky and Julian fall in love. Although Boris is not romantically attracted to Vicky, he is emotionally possessive of his new star. (Note: Director Michael Powell later clarified that the character of Boris Lermontov was homosexual.) He tries to break up the relationship by telling them that their work is getting worse, but it is implied that he is projecting his own insecurities onto the relationship, as Boris's choreographer is full of praise for Julian. Boris gives Julian an ultimatum to break up with Vicky or leave the company. Julian and Vicky move back to London together and get married. Boris breaks his no-marriage rule to rehire Irina, but cannot mentally let go of Vicky.

In London, Vicky and Julian's careers go in different directions. Julian writes an opera that is set to open in Covent Garden, while Vicky's ballet career stalls. Vicky goes on holiday to Cannes without Julian, who is focused on his work. Boris meets her there. He reminds Vicky that she is the one making all the sacrifices in her marriage, and persuades her to "put on the red shoes again".

Coincidentally, the opening night of Julian's opera in London falls on the same date as Vicky's comeback performance in Monaco. Although Julian is supposed to conduct on opening night, he abruptly leaves for Monaco as a grand gesture for Vicky. In return, he insists that Vicky cancel her performance and leave Monaco and Boris immediately. After Julian and Boris have a heated argument about the value of art versus love, an anguished Vicky chooses to stay with Ballet Lermontov.

An attendant escorts Vicky to the stage. She is wearing the red shoes, and looks faint. She suddenly runs off and jumps in front of an oncoming train, paralleling her ill-fated character in the ballet. Julian tries to save her, but cannot. As Vicky dies, she asks Julian to remove the red shoes.

A shaken Boris announces to the audience that "Miss Page is unable to dance tonight—nor indeed any other night". The company performs The Ballet of the Red Shoes with a spotlight on the empty space where Vicky would have been.

== Cast ==
- Anton Walbrook as Boris Lermontov
- Marius Goring as Julian Craster
- Moira Shearer as Victoria Page
- Robert Helpmann as Ivan Boleslawsky
- Léonide Massine as Grischa Ljubov
- Albert Bassermann as Sergei Ratov
- Ludmilla Tchérina as Irina Boronskaya
- Esmond Knight as Livingstone 'Livy' Montague
- Austin Trevor as Professor Palmer
- Jean Short as Terry
- Gordon Littman as Ike
- Eric Berry as Dimitri
- Irene Browne as Lady Neston
- Jerry Verno as Stage Door Keeper
- Yvonne Andre as Vicky's Dresser

== Themes and analysis ==
=== "Art versus life" ===
A central theme to The Red Shoes is a performer's conflict between their art and personal life. Commenting on this theme, Powell himself stated that the film is "about dying for art, that art is worth dying for." Film scholar Adrienne McLean, however, notes that Victoria's final leap to her death does not adequately represent this idea. Rather, McLean states that Victoria "seems pushed by those she loves who would rather possess her than support her," and that the film ultimately illustrates the impact that "ruthless personalities" can have on "the weaker or more demure."

Scholar Peter Fraser, in Cinema Journal, observes of this tension between art and life that the film implodes its own "narrative and lyrical worlds... from the moment of recognition, when Vicky looks down at her red shoes and knows that she is then her lyrical persona, her two worlds collapse." He further states that the interpenetration of the lyrical upon the narrative "alters the meaning of the fiction" itself. This blurring of the lyrical and the narrative is represented at the end of the film, when Vicky jumps onto the train tracks; she is wearing the red shoes which she wore while preparing in her dressing room, despite the fact that in the performance her character does not put them on until part way through the ballet. Powell and Pressburger themselves discussed this idiosyncrasy and it has been subject to significant critical analysis since. Powell decided that it was artistically "right" for Vicky to be wearing the red shoes at that point because if she is not wearing them, it takes away the ambiguity over why she died.

=== The Ballet of the Red Shoes ===
We have tried to make our [ballet] sequence subjective as well as objective. When the girl is dancing, she feels she is a bird, a flower, a cloud; when the spotlight hits her, she feels she is alone on a small island with waves breaking around; the figure of the conductor melts in turn into the form of the impresario, the magician, the lover, and at last into a figure made of newspapers.

— Art director Hein Heckroth on the film's stylized central ballet sequence, 1947

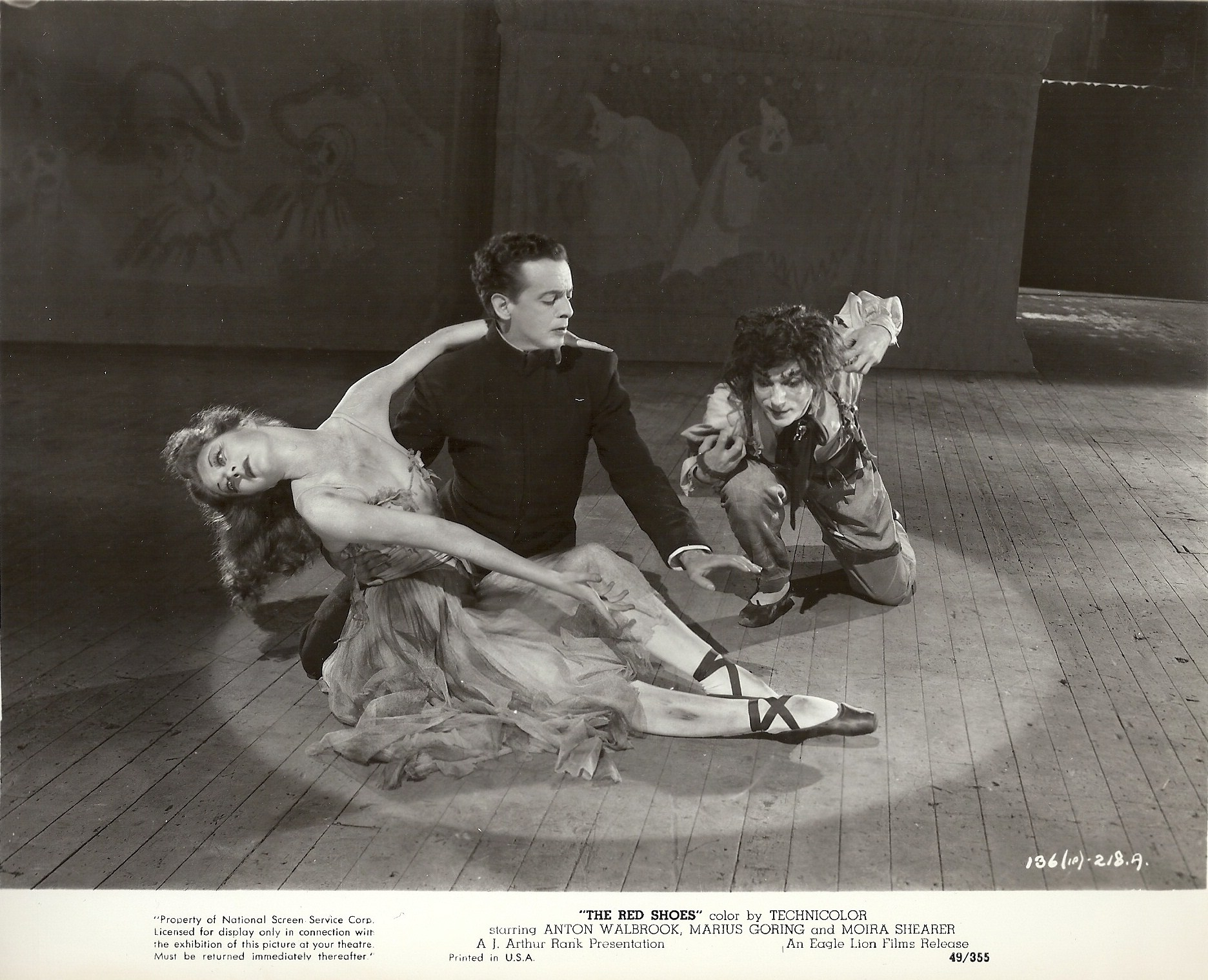
Publicity still showing a moment of the Ballet of the Red Shoes sequence

The Red Shoes is famous for featuring a 17-minute ballet sequence (of a ballet entitled The Ballet of the Red Shoes) as its centrepiece. The sequence uses a variety of filmic techniques to provide an "impressionistic link" to the Hans Christian Andersen fairytale on which it (and the ballet within the film) is based, as well as the personal struggles faced by the protagonist, Victoria Page, who is dancing the lead role. McLean notes that the ballet not only duplicates Victoria's own story, but also foreshadows her love for Julian, the composer and conductor in the ballet's orchestra, as well as the contemptuous jealousy of Lermontov, its director.

Throughout the ballet, visual metaphors and fantastical references to Victoria's own life come alive on the screen, including a portion in which she dances with a floating newspaper that alternates in form between mere paper and the human form of Helpmann's character; this is referential to a windblown newspaper that Victoria previously stepped on the night she discovered she had acquired the lead role in the ballet.

Unlike in conventional filmed theatrical ballet, the ballet sequence in The Red Shoes is not one continuous, static shot, but instead employs a variety of editing techniques, close-ups, and special effects. As the ballet progresses, McLean notes that the action of the sequence "rockets from stage right to stage left, a series of swiftly performed vignettes alternating with garishly decorated set pieces. Then, as Robert Helpmann, playing the girl's lover, is borne away into the distance by a crowd, leaving the girl alone in her cursed red shoes, the action reverses... into and through the ballerina's subconscious mind." Because of its dynamic nature and excessive use of cinematic techniques, McLean contests that the ballet sequence is a "greater, or more characteristic, film experience than a dance one."

=== Genre classification ===
The question of genre in relationship of The Red Shoes has been a recurrent preoccupation of both critics and scholars, as it does not neatly fit within the confines of a single genre. While the film's extended ballet sequences led some to characterise the film as a musical, McLean notes that the "conventional signals that had allowed fantasy elements to occur in other [musical] films are missing in The Red Shoes." Fraser contests that the film is not emblematic of the standard musical as it has a tragic and violent resolution, and that it is best understood as a "prototype of a generic variation" emerging from the musical film tradition.

The 21st-century critic Peter Bradshaw identifies elements of horror cinema in the film, particularly in its central, surreal ballet sequence, which he likens to "the surface of Lewis Carroll's looking-glass, through which the viewer is transported into a new world of amazement and occult horror."

== Production ==
=== Screenplay ===
Producer Alexander Korda had conceived a ballet-themed film in 1934, which he intended to be a biopic about Vaslav Nijinsky. The project never came to fruition, but in 1937, Korda found himself again inspired to write a ballet-themed film as a vehicle for Merle Oberon, his future wife. Korda, along with filmmaker Michael Powell, fashioned a film based on Oberon's looks, but, because she was not a skilled dancer, Korda knew he would need to use a double for any dance sequences. Korda eventually abandoned the project, instead shifting his focus to The Thief of Bagdad (1940).

In 1946, Powell and his filmmaking partner Emeric Pressburger bought the rights to the screenplay Powell had co-written with Korda for £9,000. According to Powell, the original screenplay contained significantly more dialogue and less story.

The character of Boris Lermontov was inspired in part by Sergei Diaghilev, the impresario who founded the Ballets Russes, although there are also aspects about him drawn from the personalities of producer J. Arthur Rank and even director Powell himself. The particular episode in Diaghilev's life that is said to have inspired the characterisation is his seeing the 14-year-old Diana Gould partnering Frederick Ashton in the première of his first ballet, Leda and the Swan. On the basis of this, Diaghilev invited her to join his company, but he died before that plan could come about.

==== Basis ====
The Hans Christian Andersen story tells how the orphan Karen's colour blind guardian buys her an inappropriate pair of red shoes for her church confirmation ceremony, but, when the mistake is discovered, forbids her to wear them. She disobeys. A crippled "old soldier" at the church door tells Karen they are dancing shoes. Later, she wears them to a ball, and cannot stop dancing. She dances day and night until an executioner, at her request, amputates her feet; the shoes dance away with them. She lives with a parson's family after that, and she dies with a vision of finally being able to join the Sunday congregation. In this story, the shoes represent "her sin", the vanity and worldly pleasures which distracted her from a life of generosity, piety, and community.

The ballet has three characters: the Girl, the Boy and the Shoemaker. The Boy, danced by Robert Helpmann, is at first the girl's boyfriend; as she dances, he turns into a sketch on transparent cellophane. Later he appears as the living counterpart of the Press, with "Le Jour" written on his forehead ("The Daily") and an alter ego made of folded newspapers, then as the prince in a triumphant Pas de deux/six. Finally, the Boy appears as the village parson; when he unties the red shoes, the girl dies in his arms. The Shoemaker, danced by Léonide Massine, is a diabolical figure far beyond the scope of the "old soldier". Always dancing, he tempts the girl with the shoes, installs them by "movie magic" on her feet, partners her briefly, and generally gloats over her confusion and despair. At one point he leads a mob of "primitive" monsters who surround her, but they elevate her high in a triumphant ballerina pose. At the end, the shoemaker picks up the discarded shoes and offers them to the audience. In the context of the movie, the shoes represent the choice offered by Lermontov to become a great dancer, at the expense of normal human relationships.

=== Casting ===
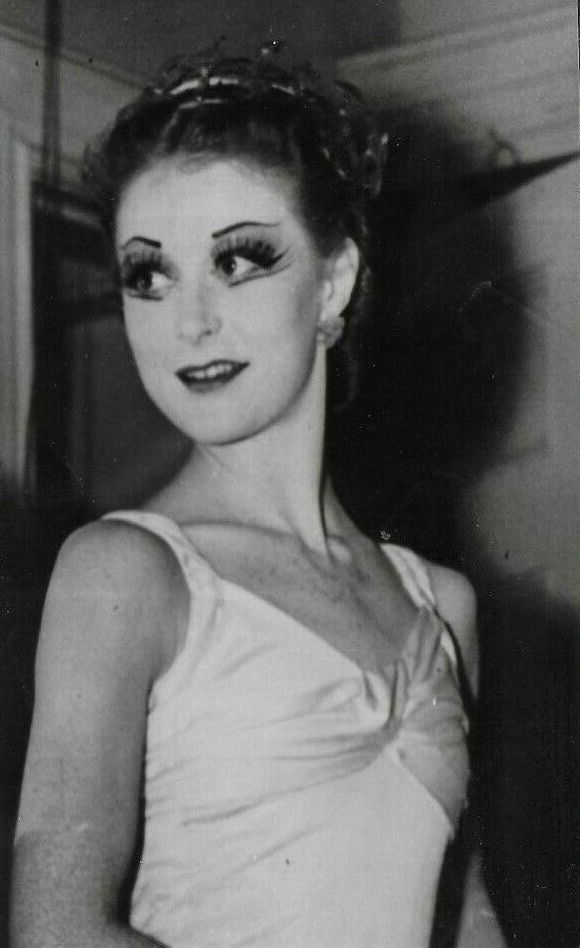
Moira Shearer, a trained ballerina, was cast in the lead role

Marius Goring was cast as Julian Craster.

Powell and Pressburger decided early on that they had to use dancers who could act rather than actors who could dance. To create a realistic feeling of a ballet company at work, and to be able to include a fifteen-minute ballet as the high point of the film, they created their own ballet company using many dancers from The Royal Ballet.

In casting the lead role of Victoria Page, Powell and Pressburger sought an experienced dancer who could also act. Scottish ballerina Moira Shearer was recommended by Robert Helpmann, who had been cast in the film as Ivan Boleslawsky, and was also appointed the choreographer of the central ballet sequence; Helpmann had worked with Shearer prior in a production of his ballet Miracle in the Gorbals. At the time, Shearer was beginning to ascend in her career with the Sadler's Wells Dance Company, dancing under Ninette de Valois. Upon reading the screenplay, Shearer declined the offer, as she felt taking a film role would negatively impact her dancing career. She also felt that the screenplay presented a ballet company that was unrealistic, "utterly unlike any ballet company that there had ever been anywhere." She recalled: "Red Shoes was the last thing I wanted to do. I fought for a year to get away from that film, and I couldn't shake the director off."

After Shearer's refusal of the role, American ballerinas Nana Gollner and Edwina Seaver tested for the part, but their acting abilities proved unsatisfactory to Powell and Pressburger. Non-dancers Hazel Court and Ann Todd were briefly considered before Shearer changed her mind, and decided to accept the role with de Valois's blessing. Shearer claimed that de Valois, exasperated by the ordeal, finally advised her to take the role. Powell alternatively recounted that de Valois was "more manipulative" in the process, and would vacillate in regard to whether or not Shearer would have a place in the company to return to once filming was completed, accounting for Shearer's alleged protracted contemplation of whether to take the part.

For the role of Julian Craster, the musician with whom Victoria falls in love, Marius Goring was cast. While Goring—at the time in his mid-30s—was slightly too old to play the role, Powell and Pressburger were impressed by his "tact and unselfish approach to his craft." They cast Anton Walbrook in the part of Victoria's domineering ballet director, Boris Lermontov, for similar reasons, as they felt he was a "well-mannered and sensitive actor" who could support Shearer through their emotional scenes together.

The other principal dancers cast in the film included Léonide Massine (who also served as a choreographer for his role as the shoemaker in The Ballet of the Red Shoes), portraying dancer Grischa Ljubov, and Ludmilla Tchérina as dancer Irina Boronskaya; the latter was cast by Powell, who was captivated by her unconventional beauty.

=== Filming ===
Filming of The Red Shoes took place primarily in Paris, with principal photography beginning in June 1947. Jack Cardiff, who had shot Powell and Pressburger's Black Narcissus, served as cinematographer. The shooting schedule ran for approximately fifteen weeks, on a budget of £300,000 (equivalent to £13.34 million or US$17.05 million in 2024). Filming also occurred on location in London, Monte Carlo, and the Côte d'Azur. Some sequences were filmed at Pinewood Studios, including the stage and orchestra pit sequences, which were sets constructed specifically for the film.

It is the way the film is shot and edited, the number of close-ups, a particular handling of the tools of cinematic technique, that creates the drama; there is more revealed by method than anything inherent in the dramatic context of the scenes.

— Critic Adrienne McLean on the film's technical feats

According to biographer Mark Connelly, the shoot was largely copacetic, with the cast and crew having a "happy time" on set. On the first day of the shoot, Powell addressed the cast and crew: "We'll be doing things that haven't been done before, we'll have to work very hard—but I know it's going to be worth it." The shooting of the film's central The Ballet of Red Shoes sequence took approximately six weeks, according to Shearer, who recalled that it was completed in the middle of the production. Powell disputed this, instead claiming that it was the last portion of the film to be shot. Filming the ballet proved difficult for experienced dancers, who were used to performing live ballet, as the filming process required them to spend hours preparing to shoot moments that lasted sometimes only a few seconds. Shearer recalled that the ballet sequence was "so cinematically worked out that we were lucky if we ever danced for as long as one minute."

The shoot overran significantly, totalling twenty-four weeks rather than the planned fifteen, and the final budget ballooned to over £500,000. John Davis, the chief accountant of The Rank Organisation, forced a £10,000 cut to Powell and Pressburger's salaries due to the film going over budget. Because the shoot was extended so far beyond schedule, Powell and Pressburger promised the cast and crew a fortnight's holiday in September.

=== Choreography and score ===
Australian ballet star Robert Helpmann choreographed the ballet, played the role of the lead dancer of the Ballet Lermontov and danced the part of the boyfriend. Léonide Massine created his own choreography for his role as the Shoemaker. Brian Easdale composed the original music for the film, including the full ballet of The Red Shoes. Easdale conducted most of the music in the film, except for the Ballet of the Red Shoes, where Sir Thomas Beecham conducted the score and received prominent screen credit. Beecham's Royal Philharmonic Orchestra was the featured orchestra for the film. Hilda Gaunt, the long-term Sadler's Wells and Royal Ballet pianist, is also credited as accompanist, but does not appear.

The score for The Red Shoes was written to "fit the cinematic design," and completed in an unorthodox manner: Easdale composed the score for the film's central ballet sequence based on cartoon drawings and storyboards approved by Helpmann, which were assembled in the correct sequence. A total of 120 drawings were provided to help guide Easdale in writing an appropriate musical accompaniment. As filming of the ballet sequence progressed, the hand drawings were replaced by the corresponding completed shots. Easdale received the 1948 Academy Award for Best Original Score, the first British film composer so honoured.

== Release ==
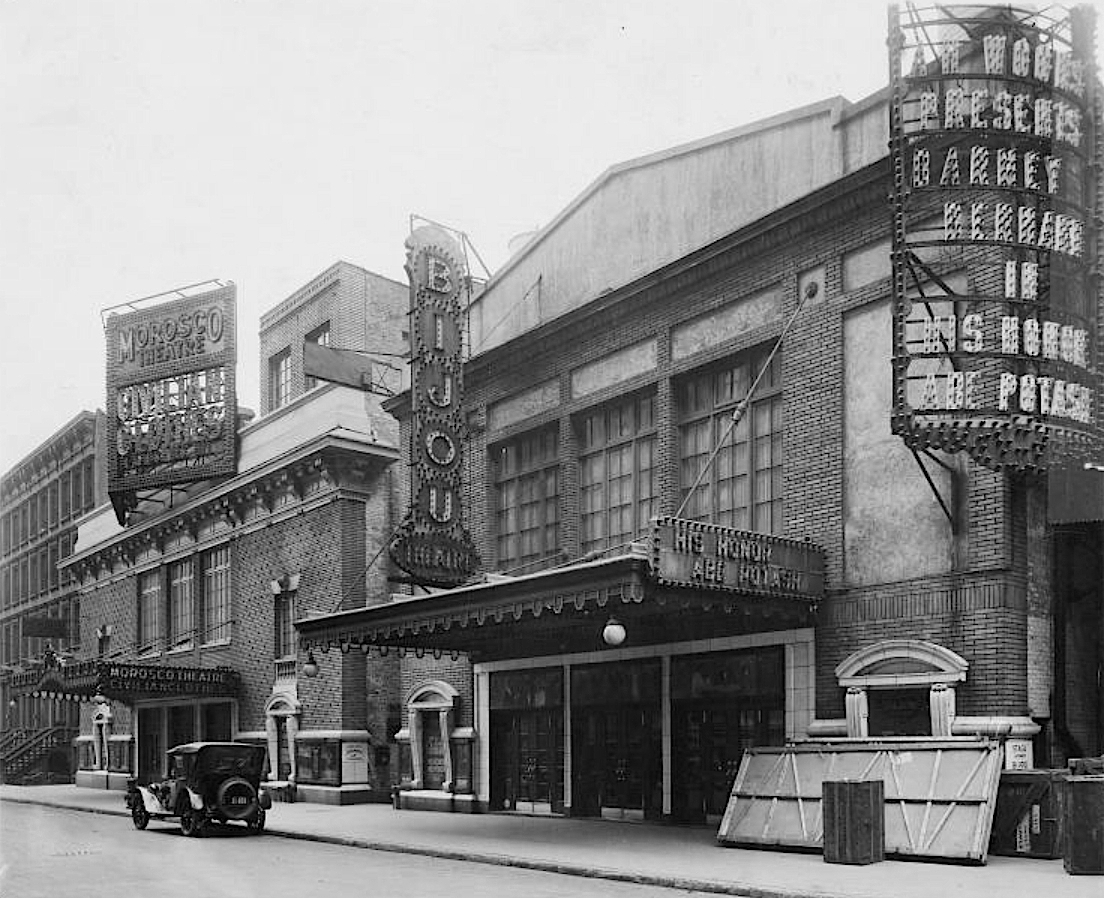
The film screened continuously for over two years at Manhattan's Bijou Theatre

The Red Shoes had its world premiere in London on 22 July 1948, with a general United Kingdom release following on 6 September 1948. Upon its initial release in the United Kingdom the film was a low-earning picture, as the Rank Organisation could not afford to spend much on promotion due to severe financial problems exacerbated by the expense of Caesar and Cleopatra (1945). Also, according to Powell, the Rank Organisation did not understand the artistic merits of the film, and this strain in the relationship between The Archers and Rank led to the end of the partnership between them, with The Archers moving to work for Alexander Korda.

Under distribution by Eagle-Lion Films, the film had its United States premiere at the National Theatre in Washington, D.C. on 15 October 1948, marking the first ever motion picture to be exhibited at the venue in its 113-year history. It opened the following week at New York City's Bijou Theatre on 21 October 1948. Due to its popularity, the film screened at the Bijou Theatre continuously for over two years, with tickets available on a reserved-seat, advance-price basis. The film had its west coast premiere at the Fine Arts Theatre in Beverly Hills on 28 December 1948.

=== Home media and restoration ===
The American home media company The Criterion Collection released The Red Shoes on LaserDisc in 1994, and on DVD in 1999.

Before-and-after comparison of the film illustrating its restoration

Efforts to restore The Red Shoes began in the early 2000s. With fundraising spearheaded by Martin Scorsese and his longtime editor (and Powell's widow), Thelma Schoonmaker, Robert Gitt and Barbara Whitehead formally began the restoration in the fall of 2006 at the UCLA Film and Television Archive, along with the help of the United States Film Foundation. Gitt, the chief preservation officer of the UCLA Archive, supervised the restoration, assisting Whitehead in reviewing each individual frame of the film—192,960 in the print, 578,880 in the tripartite negative. The original negatives had suffered extensive harm, including shrinkage and mould damage. Because the damage to the negatives was so significant, digital restoration was the only viable method of rehabilitating the film. The 4K digital restoration was completed with the help of the Prasad Corporation and Warner Bros. Motion Picture Imaging to remove dirt, scratches, and other flaws. Digital methods were also used to remove pops, crackles and background hiss from the film's original optical soundtrack.

The newly restored version of The Red Shoes had its world premiere at the 2009 Cannes Film Festival. Several months later, in October 2009, ITV Films released the restored version on Blu-ray in the United Kingdom. On 20 July 2010, The Criterion Collection again reissued the film in its restored state on DVD and Blu-ray. Reviewing the Criterion Blu-ray, which includes an illustrative demonstration of the film's restoration, Stuart Galbraith of DVD Talk referred to the "before and after" comparisons as "shocking and heartening at once."

On 14 December 2021, The Criterion Collection released the 2009 restoration of The Red Shoes in 4K, as part of their first six-film slate of 4K UHD disc releases.

== Reception ==
=== Box office ===
Despite a lack of advertising, The Red Shoes went on to become the sixth most popular film at the British box office in 1948. According to Kinematograph Weekly the 'biggest winner' at the box office in 1948 Britain was The Best Years of Our Lives with Spring in Park Lane being the best British film and "runners up" being It Always Rains on Sunday, My Brother Jonathan, Road to Rio, Miranda, An Ideal Husband, The Naked City, The Red Shoes, Green Dolphin Street, Forever Amber, Life with Father, The Weaker Sex, Oliver Twist, The Fallen Idol and The Winslow Boy.

In the United States, the film had earned $2.2 million (equivalent to $23.53 million in 2025) in US rentals by the end of 1948. It ended its run at New York City's Bijou Theatre on 13 November 1950, having played for a total of 107 weeks. The success of this run convinced Universal Pictures that The Red Shoes was a worthwhile film and they took over the US distribution in 1951. The Red Shoes went on to become one of the highest-earning British films of all time, with a record-breaking gross of over $5 million.

According to one account, producer's receipts were £179,900 in the UK and £1,111,400 overseas. It made a reported profit of £785,700.

=== Critical response ===
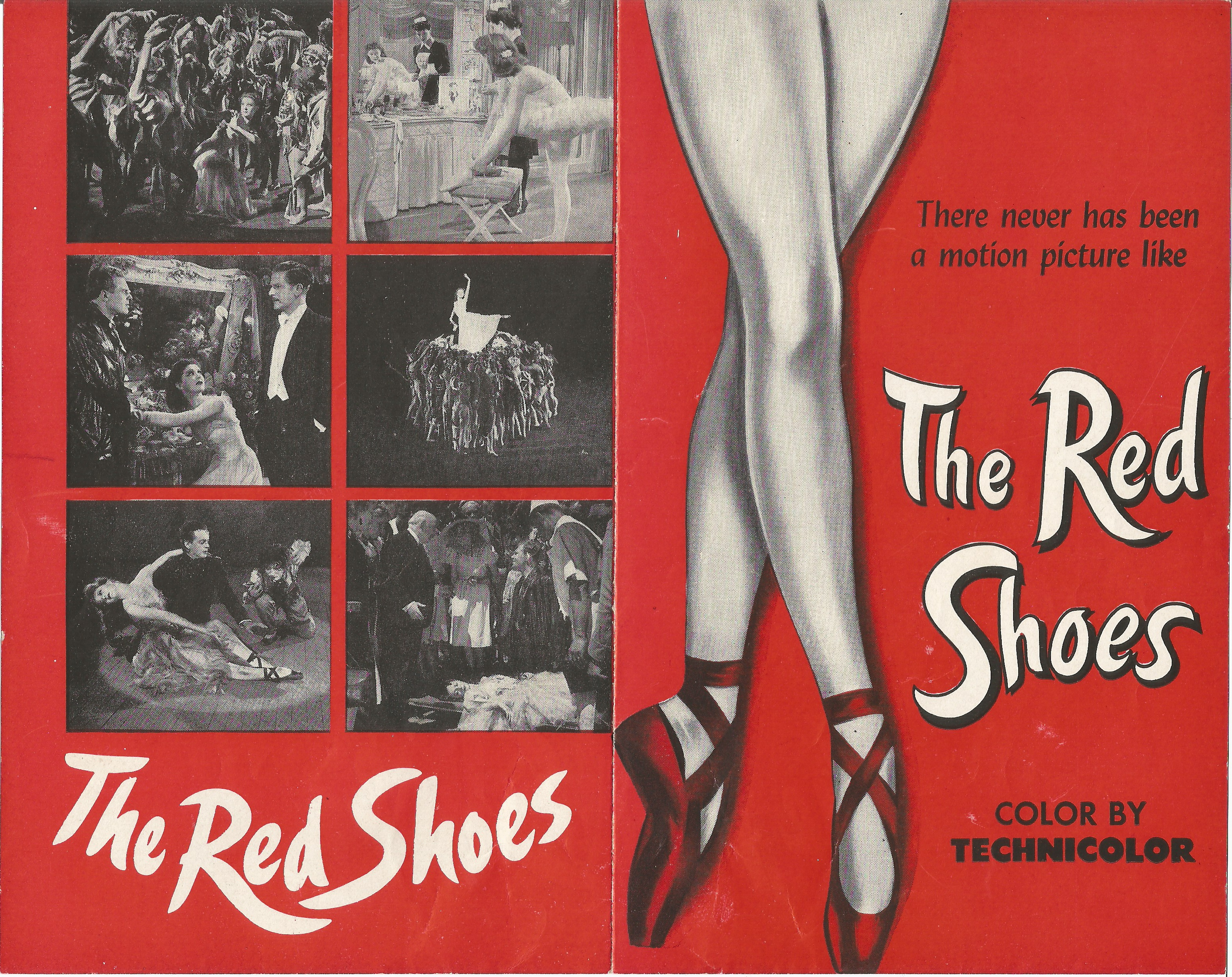
Promotional flyer for the film

Film scholar Mark Connelly notes that interpreting the contemporaneous critical response to The Red Shoes is a "complicated task, as there are no simple divisions between those who liked the film and those who did not." Connelly concludes that the reaction was notably "complex and mixed." Adrienne McLean similarly states that the film received "only mixed" reviews from both cinema and ballet critics. Upon its release in the United Kingdom, the film received some criticism from the national press, particularly aimed at Powell and Pressburger for the perception that the feature was "undisciplined and downright un-British." Film historian Jerry Vermilye summarised the film's reception in its home country as "indifferent".

While the film had its detractors in Britain, it was lauded by some national critics, such as Dilys Powell, who deemed it an "extreme pleasure" and "brilliantly experimental." Writing for The Monthly Film Bulletin, Marion Eames praised the performances of Shearer and Goring, as well as the score. The Daily Film Renter published a divisive review, noting that Powell and Pressburger "have fumbled over a fine idea, and their opulent work trembles between the heights and the depths". Despite this, it was voted the third-best film of the year in a readers' poll by the Daily Mail, behind Spring in Park Lane and Oliver Twist.

Initial reception proved more favourable in the United States, where the film went on to garner mainstream attention after it began screening in the US arthouse circuit. The film was also well-received in Japan. Philip K. Scheuer of the Los Angeles Times lauded the film, writing that Powell and Pressburger take a "skeletal frame and clothe it in glowing flesh; then accouter this in shining garments. When they have finished one sees much more than the figure of a ballerina; one is gazing upon the whole milieu, an unfolding world of the ballet—onstage, offstage, backstage". Bosley Crowther of The New York Times praised the performances of Shearer, Helpmann, and Massine, and summarized: "There has never been a picture in which the ballet and its special, magic world have been so beautifully and dreamily presented". Herbert L. Larson of The Oregonian praised the film's accessibility to audiences unfamiliar with the art and technical aspects of ballet, writing that the filmmakers and performers "have woven much of human nature into this brilliant film".

A main point of contention amongst both British and American critics was a perceived lack of realism concerning the ballet sequences. The focus of this criticism was the film's central 17-minute ballet performance of The Ballet of the Red Shoes: Many dance critics felt the sequence's impressionistic touches—which include abstract hallucinations and visual manifestations of Vicky's mental state—detracted from the physical aspects of the ballet. British ballet critic Kathrine Sorley Walker also dismissed the sequence, commenting that it marked "a departure from the illusion of stage ballet to the limitless and lush spaces reflecting the ballerina's thought." Eames made similar criticism, condemning the subjective elements of the sequence as "corrupting the integrity of the ballet," as well as the choreography. Philip K. Scheuer of the Los Angeles Times, however, praised the presentation of ballet in the film, deeming it "the most ambitious—and probably the most dazzlingly successful—use of traditional-type ballet in any motion picture to date."

=== Accolades ===
Institution	Year	Category	Recipient(s)	Result	Ref.
Academy Awards	1949	Best Picture	Michael Powell; Emeric Pressburger	Nominated	
Academy Awards	1949	Best Story	Emeric Pressburger	Nominated	
Academy Awards	1949	Best Original Score	Brian Easdale	Won	
Academy Awards	1949	Best Art Direction	Hein Heckroth; Arthur Lawson	Won	
Academy Awards	1949	Best Film Editing	Reginald Mills	Nominated	
British Academy Film Awards	1949	Best British Film	The Red Shoes	Nominated	
Golden Globe Awards	1949	Best Original Score	Brian Easdale	Won	
National Board of Review	1949	Top Ten Films	The Red Shoes	Won	
Online Film & Television Association	2018	Film Hall of Fame Award	The Red Shoes	Honored	
Venice Film Festival	1948	Grand International Award	Michael Powell; Emeric Pressburger	Nominated	

== Works inspired by the film ==
The 1952 film The Firebird, directed by Hasse Ekman, is largely an homage to The Red Shoes.

In the 1975 Broadway musical A Chorus Line and its 1985 film adaptation, several of the characters speak of The Red Shoes inspiring their decision to become dancers.

Kate Bush's 1993 album The Red Shoes and its title track were inspired by the film. The music was subsequently used in The Line, the Cross and the Curve (1993) a film referencing The Red Shoes written and directed by Bush. It stars Miranda Richardson and Lindsay Kemp.

The film was adapted by Jule Styne (music) and Marsha Norman (book and lyrics) into a Broadway musical, which was directed by Stanley Donen. The Red Shoes opened on 16 December 1993 at the Gershwin Theatre, with Steve Barton playing Boris Lermontov, Margaret Illmann playing Victoria Page, and Hugh Panaro playing Julian Craster. The choreography by Lar Lubovitch received the TDF's Astaire Award, but the musical closed after 51 previews and only five performances.

In 1996, St Martin's Press published The Red Shoes, a novel written by Michael Powell and Emeric Pressburger.

In 2005, Ballet Ireland produced Diaghilev and the Red Shoes, a tribute to Sergei Diaghilev, the ballet impresario who founded Ballets Russes. consisting of excerpts from works made famous by that seminal company. An excerpt from The Red Shoes ballet was included, since Diaghilev was one inspiration for the character of Lermontov.

In 2013, Korean singer-songwriter IU released the album Modern Times, which featured the lead single "The Red Shoes", whose lyrics were inspired by the fairy tale, and whose music video was adapted from the film.

The film was adapted as a ballet choreographed by Matthew Bourne and premiered in December 2016 in London. The production used music adapted from film scores by Bernard Herrmann, including themes from The Ghost and Mrs. Muir (1947) and Vertigo (1958), in place of Brian Easdale's Oscar-winning score from the 1948 film.

In 2022, the award-winning short film Òran na h-Eala vividly explored Moira Shearer's heart and mind just before and after she agreed to star in The Red Shoes, a decision that would change her life forever. The film unfolds as a string of dreamlike sequences while Moira sits at a dressing room mirror, reflecting on her career choices.

== Legacy ==
Retrospectively, it is regarded as one of the best films of Powell and Pressburger's partnership, and in 1999, it was voted the ninth greatest British film of all time by the British Film Institute. In the intervening years, it has garnered status as a cult film and an archetypal dance film. In 2017, a poll of 150 actors, directors, writers, producers and critics for Time Out magazine saw it ranked the fifth best British film ever. Filmmakers such as Brian De Palma, Martin Scorsese, Francis Ford Coppola, and Steven Spielberg have named it one of their all-time favourite films, and Roger Ebert included it in his list of Great Movies. The February 2020 issue of New York Magazine lists The Red Shoes as among "The Best Movies That Lost Best Picture at the Oscars."

The film is particularly known for its cinematography and especially the use of Technicolor. In the introduction for The Criterion Collection DVD of Jean Renoir's The River, Scorsese considers The Red Shoes and The River to be the two most beautiful colour films.

== See also ==
- BFI Top 100 British films

== Sources ==
- Chapman, J. (2024). The Money Behind the Screen: A History of British Film Finance, 1945-1985. Edinburgh, Scotland: Edinburgh University Press. ISBN 978-1-399-50077-7.
- Connelly, Mark (2005). The Red Shoes: Turner Classic Movies British Film Guide. London: I. B. Tauris. ISBN 978-1-845-11071-0.
- Fraser, Peter (Spring 1987). "The Musical Mode: Putting on "The Red Shoes"". Cinema Journal. 26 (3). Austin, Texas: University of Texas Press: 44–54. doi:10.2307/1224907. ISSN 0009-7101. JSTOR 1224907.
- Harper, Sue; Porter, Vincent (2003). British Cinema of The 1950s The Decline of Deference. Oxford, England: Oxford University Press. ISBN 978-0-191-54164-3.
- Lant, Antonia (1991). Blackout: Reinventing Women for Wartime British Cinema. Princeton, New Jersey: Princeton University Press. ISBN 978-1-400-86219-1.
- McLean, Adrienne L. (1988). "The Red Shoes Revisited". Dance Chronicle. 11 (1). New York City, New York: Routledge: 31–83. doi:10.1080/01472528708568965. ISSN 0147-2526.
- McLean, Adrienne L. (2008). Dying Swans and Madmen: Ballet, the Body, and Narrative Cinema. Rutgers, New Jersey: Rutgers University Press. ISBN 978-0-813-54467-0.
- Macdonald, Kevin (1994). Emeric Pressburger: The Life and Death of a Screenwriter. London, England: Faber and Faber. ISBN 978-0-571-16853-8.
- Mayer, Geoff (2003). Guide to British Cinema. Westport, Connecticut: Greenwood Publishing Group. ISBN 978-0-313-30307-4.
- Powell, Michael (1986). A Life in Movies. London, England: Heinemann. ISBN 0-434-59945-X.
- Salwolke, Scott (1996). The Films of Michael Powell and the Archers. Lanham, Maryland: Scarecrow Press. ISBN 978-0-810-83183-4.
- Street, Sarah (2016). Transatlantic Crossings: British Feature Films in the United States. New York City, New York: Bloomsbury. ISBN 978-1-474-29068-5.
- Vermilye, Jerry (1978). The Great British Films. London, England: Citadel Press. ISBN 978-0-806-50699-9.
