= The Man I Love (song) =

1924 popular standard song by George and Ira Gershwin

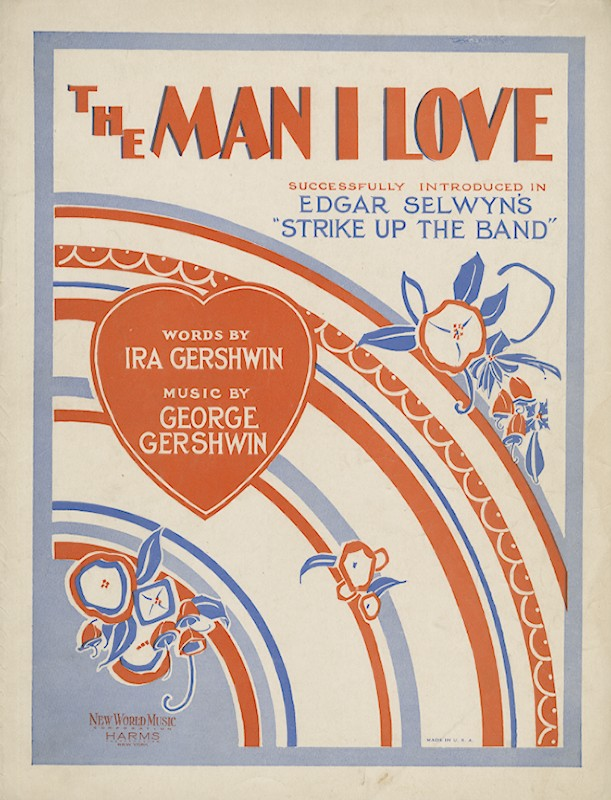
- Original sheet music cover, 1924

Composition
- Language: en
- Published: December 1, 1924, by Harms, Inc.
- Genre: Traditional pop; jazz
- Composer: George Gershwin
- Lyricist: Ira Gershwin

Gershwin's piano transcription
- Performed by Constantin Stephan, 2020: file; help

"The Man I Love" is a popular standard with music by George Gershwin and lyrics by his brother Ira Gershwin. Part of the 1924 score for the Gershwin musical comedy Lady, Be Good, the song was removed from that show and put into the Gershwins's 1927 government satire Strike Up the Band (where it appears as "The Man I Love" and "The Girl I Love"), which closed out-of-town. It was considered for, then rejected from, the 1928 Florenz Ziegfeld Jr. hit Rosalie.

It was used as the title of, and was prominently featured in, the 1947 film-noir melodrama The Man I Love, starring Ida Lupino and Bruce Bennett.

== Covers ==
"The Man I Love"

Single by Kate Bush

from the album The Glory of Gershwin
- B-side: "Rhapsody in Blue (edit)"
- Released: July 18, 1994
- Length: 3:17
- Label: Mercury
- Composer: George Gershwin
- Lyricist: Ira Gershwin
- Producer: George Martin

Kate Bush singles chronology
"The Red Shoes" (1994)	"The Man I Love" (1994)	"And So Is Love" (1994)

Music video
- "The Man I Love" on YouTube

Like many songs from George and Ira Gershwin, "The Man I Love" is considered part of the Great American Songbook. Composed in AABA form, it was covered on stage and on record by many artists. An early notable performance was by the Benny Goodman Quartet at the Goodman band's 1938 Carnegie Hall Concert (with Goodman on clarinet, Gene Krupa on drums, Teddy Wilson on piano, and Lionel Hampton on vibraphone), famed not only as part of that historic jazz concert but for being done by one of the first integrated groups of black and white musicians to perform in concert in the United States.

In 1994, the song was recorded by Kate Bush for Larry Adler's tribute album The Glory of Gershwin, released as a single on July 18, 1994; it reached number 27 on the UK singles chart.

== See also ==
- List of 1920s jazz standards
