= And So Is Love =

1994 Kate Bush Single

"And So is Love"

Single by Kate Bush

from the album The Red Shoes
- B-side: "Rubberband Girl (US Mix)"; "Eat the Music (US Mix)"
- Released: 31 October 1994
- Recorded: 1990–1993
- Studio: Abbey Road Studios (London, England)
- Genre: Art rock
- Length: 4:17
- Label: EMI
- Songwriter(s): Kate Bush
- Producer(s): Kate Bush

Kate Bush singles chronology
"The Man I Love" (1994)	"And So is Love" (1994)	"King of the Mountain" (2005)

Music video
- "And So Is Love" on YouTube

"And So Is Love" is a song written and recorded by English musician Kate Bush. It was the fifth and final single release from her seventh album, The Red Shoes (1993). Guest star Eric Clapton plays guitar on the track and the Hammond organ is by Gary Brooker of Procol Harum. Released on 31 October 1994 by EMI, the single climbed to number 26 on the UK Singles Chart. Bush later recorded a new version of the song, with altered lyrics, for her album Director's Cut.

"Eat the Music" also appears on the UK "And So Is Love" CD single, in the same version as on the 12-inch single featured on the US CD and cassingle. Additionally, there is a third version, the so-called "Extended Mix" which appears on the European and Australian singles, and which is in reality 12 seconds shorter than the LP mix.

== Critical reception ==
Upon its release as a single, Andrew Hirst of the Huddersfield Daily Examiner wrote, "Faintly foreboding, eerily ethereal, always arty. That's our Kate." Alan Jones from Music Week named it Pick of the Week, adding, "Moodily unravelling, with assistance from occasionally flaring Eric Clapton guitar, this is a superior effort from Kate."

== Track listings ==
7" single

No.	Title	Length
1.	"And So Is Love"	4:12
2.	"Rubberband Girl (US Mix)"	3:46

CD single

No.	Title	Length
1.	"And So Is Love"	4:18
2.	"Rubberband Girl (US Mix)"	3:49
3.	"Eat the Music (US Mix)"	9:21

== Charts ==
Chart (1994)	Peak position
Europe (Eurochart Hot 100)	93
UK Singles (OCC)	26
