= Director's Cut (Kate Bush album) =

Studio album by Kate Bush
- Released: 16 May 2011
- Recorded: 2009–2011
- Length: 57:04
- Labels: Fish People; EMI
- Producer: Kate Bush

Kate Bush chronology
Aerial (2005)	Director's Cut (2011)	50 Words for Snow (2011)

Singles from Director's Cut
- 1. "Deeper Understanding" Released: 5 April 2011

Director's Cut is the ninth studio album by the English singer-songwriter Kate Bush, released on 16 May 2011. It consists of new versions of songs from her earlier albums The Sensual World (1989) and The Red Shoes (1993). All tracks have new lead vocals, drums, and instrumentation and are remixed and restructured. Some songs were transposed to a lower key to accommodate Bush's lowering voice. Three of the songs, including "This Woman's Work", have been completely rerecorded, often with lyrics changed in places. Bush described the album as a new project rather than a collection of remixes.

It was Bush's first album release since 2005's Aerial and the first on her own record label, Fish People.

Bush wrote all of the songs and lyrics with the exception of lines borrowed from James Joyce. The album has received mostly positive critical reviews.

== Overview ==
Released in May 2011, the album features four tracks taken from The Sensual World (1989) and seven from The Red Shoes (1993) which have been re-recorded while retaining most of the original instrumentation.

Regarding the entirely new lyrics to the song "The Sensual World", now re-titled "Flower of the Mountain", Bush said this: "Originally when I wrote the song "The Sensual World" I had used text from the end of Ulysses by James Joyce, put to a piece of music I had written. When I asked for permission to use the text I was refused, which was disappointing. I then wrote my own lyrics for the song although I felt that the original idea had been more interesting. Well, I'm not James Joyce am I? When I came to work on this project I thought I would ask for permission again and this time they said yes. It is now re-titled "Flower of the Mountain" and I am delighted that I have had the chance to fulfill the original concept. For some time I have felt that I wanted to revisit tracks from these two albums and that they could benefit from having new life breathed into them. Lots of work had gone into the two original albums and now these songs have another layer of work woven into their fabric. I think of this as a new album."

All the lead vocals on Director's Cut and some of the backing vocals have been re-recorded, with some of the songs transposed to a lower key to accommodate Bush's matured voice. Additionally, the drum tracks have been reconceived and re-recorded, with some of the tracks featuring Steve Gadd. Bassist Danny Thompson also appears and, on backing vocals, Mica Paris. Three songs have been completely re-recorded: "This Woman's Work", "Rubberband Girl" and "Moments of Pleasure".

Director's Cut is available as a digital album, a standard CD in a case-bound book, a deluxe version ("Collector's Edition"), consisting of a box set including Director's Cut, The Sensual World and The Red Shoes (re-mastered from digital to analogue), and two-disc vinyl. Director's Cut was recorded using analogue equipment. Bush stated in an interview for BBC radio that she never liked the "hard-edged sound" of the digitally recorded The Red Shoes and feels both the new recordings of the songs from this album and the re-mastered The Red Shoes have a "warmer, fuller sound".

The album peaked at No. 2 on the UK Albums Chart and has spent 8 weeks in the top 100. It fell quickly down the chart after its first week but sold consistently and has since been certified Gold in the UK. The album also charted in a number of other countries, including a number-four entry on the Irish Albums Chart, and also reached the top 10 in the Netherlands and Norway.

Director's Cut versions of "Lily" and "Top of the City" were performed live for the first time during the 2014 Before the Dawn series of concerts.

In November 2018, Bush released box sets of remasters of her studio albums, including Directors Cut.

== Singles ==
The only single to be released from the album was "Deeper Understanding", originally the sixth track of The Sensual World. Its lyrics describe a relationship between a lonely person and a computer which has replaced human companionship. The video was released through her official YouTube account. The song features a newly recorded main vocal by Bush, and the voice of her son Bertie on the chorus. The single, upon its initial release as a digital download, charted in the UK at No. 87.

== Critical reception ==
Professional ratings
Aggregate scores
Source	Rating
AnyDecentMusic?	7.4/10
Metacritic	80/100
Review scores
Source	Rating
AllMusic	3.5/5 stars
The Daily Telegraph	4/5 stars
Entertainment Weekly	B+
The Guardian	4/5 stars
The Independent	5/5 stars
NME	8/10
Pitchfork	7.3/10
Q	4/5 stars
Spin	9/10
Uncut	4/5 stars

Critical reception for the album was mostly positive, with reviewers acknowledging the confusion surrounding the release of this revisitation of old songs. At Metacritic, which assigns a normalised rating out of 100 to reviews from mainstream critics, the album received an average score of 80, based on 22 reviews, which indicates "generally favorable reviews". Simon Price of The Independent noted: "Director's Cut was greeted with reactions ranging between disappointment, bafflement and ridicule, before anyone had heard a note... taken on its own merits, however, there's plenty to enjoy".

In a 4-star review, Fiona Shephard of The Scotsman wrote "Ever the perfectionist, Kate Bush has revisited earlier songs, the first-time recordings of which didn't reflect her original vision. The resulting revamps are satisfying, rounded – and occasionally bizarre." Thom Jurek of AllMusic stated that he found the release "deeply engaging and satisfying" and that since Bush has "her own world-class recording studio" where "she's kept up with technology" that it shows positively in the details added to the remade songs.

== Track listing ==
All songs written by Kate Bush except "Flower of the Mountain" lyrics by James Joyce.

1. "Flower of the Mountain" – 5:15 (reworking of "The Sensual World"; originally from The Sensual World, 1989)
2. "Song of Solomon" – 4:45 (originally from The Red Shoes, 1993)
3. "Lily" – 4:05 (originally from The Red Shoes, 1993)
4. "Deeper Understanding" – 6:33 (originally from The Sensual World, 1989)
5. "The Red Shoes" – 4:58 (originally from The Red Shoes, 1993)
6. "This Woman's Work" – 6:30 (originally from The Sensual World, 1989)
7. "Moments of Pleasure" – 6:32 (originally from The Red Shoes, 1993)
8. "Never Be Mine" – 5:05 (originally from The Sensual World, 1989)
9. "Top of the City" – 4:24 (originally from The Red Shoes, 1993)
10. "And So Is Love" – 4:21 (originally from The Red Shoes, 1993)
11. "Rubberband Girl" – 4:37 (originally from The Red Shoes, 1993)

== Personnel ==
- Kate Bush – vocals, keyboards, backing vocals, piano
- Paddy Bush – mandola, flute, whistle, backing vocals
- Steve Gadd – drums
- John Giblin, Eberhard Weber, Danny Thompson – bass guitar
- Danny McIntosh, Eric Clapton – guitar
- Gary Brooker – Hammond organ
- Albert McIntosh – programming, backing vocals
- Brendan Power – harmonica
- Ed Rowntree, Mica Paris, Jacob Thorn, Michael Wood, Jevan Johnson Booth – backing vocals

== Charts ==
=== Weekly charts ===
Weekly chart performance for Director's Cut
Chart (2011)	Peak position
Australian Albums (ARIA)	41
Austrian Albums (Ö3 Austria)	35
Belgian Albums (Ultratop Flanders)	27
Belgian Albums (Ultratop Wallonia)	20
Canadian Albums (Nielsen SoundScan)	66
Czech Albums (ČNS IFPI)	4
Danish Albums (Hitlisten)	11
Dutch Albums (Album Top 100)	6
Finnish Albums (Suomen virallinen lista)	8
French Albums (SNEP)	31
German Albums (Offizielle Top 100)	11
Irish Albums (IRMA)	4
Italian Albums (FIMI)	32
Japanese Albums (Oricon)	132
New Zealand Albums (RMNZ)	38
Norwegian Albums (VG-lista)	2
Polish Albums (ZPAV)	28
Scottish Albums (Official Charts)	2
Spanish Albums (Promusicae)	71
Swedish Albums (Sverigetopplistan)	12
Swiss Albums (Schweizer Hitparade)	23
UK Albums (Official Charts)	2
US Independent Albums (Billboard)	36
US Top Current Album Sales (Billboard)	186

Weekly chart performance for Director's Cut
Chart (2014)	Peak position
UK Albums (Official Charts)	44

=== Year-end charts ===
Year-end chart performance for Director's Cut
Chart (2011)	Position
UK Albums (OCC)	166

== Certifications ==
Certifications for Director's Cut
Region	Certification	Certified units/sales
United Kingdom (BPI)	Gold	100,000^{‡}
^{‡} Sales+streaming figures based on certification alone.

== See also ==
- "Deeper Understanding"
