= Trio Bulgarka =

Bulgarian vocal ensemble

- Also known as: Bulgarka Folk Trio, Three Golden Coins
- Origin: Bulgaria
- Genres: World music
- Years active: 1975–1999
- Label: Hannibal
- Members: Stoyanka Boneva; Yanka Rupkina; Eva Georgieva

Trio Bulgarka (Bulgarian: Трио „Българка“; also known as "Three Golden Coins", previously known as "Bulgarka Folk Trio") were a Bulgarian vocal ensemble.

They gained international prominence through their contributions to the groundbreaking 1975 world music album Balkana: The music of Bulgaria, originally released on the now defunct Hannibal label.

The three women in the trio were Stoyanka Boneva from Pirin, Yanka Rupkina from Strandzha and Eva Georgieva from Dobruja. Their diversity of regional backgrounds enabled them to create a unique sound to their music. They recorded for record labels Bulgaria Balkanton and Hannibal in 1987. In 1988, their album The Forest Is Crying, produced by Joe Boyd was released.

As part of the Bulgarian State Television Female Vocal Choir, they appeared on the album Le Mystère des Voix Bulgares, Volume Two, which won a Grammy Award in 1989.

In 1989 they were featured on The Sensual World album by Kate Bush, on the songs "Deeper Understanding", "Never Be Mine", and "Rocket's Tail". In 1993 they appeared on another Kate Bush album, The Red Shoes, in the songs "You're the One", "The Song of Solomon", and "Why Should I Love You?", which also featured Prince.

"I've never worked with women on such an intense creative level," Bush told the Los Angeles Times in January 1990, "and it was something strange to feel this very strong female energy in the studio. It was interesting to see the way the men in the studio reacted… Instead of just one female, there was a very strong female presence."

The trio disbanded at the end of the 1990s, and Eva Georgieva died in 2004. Yanka Rupkina died April 7, 2026 following a stroke.

== Discography ==
Albums

- The Forest Is Crying (Lament For Indje Voivode), Hannibal Records, 1988
- Bulgarka Vocal Trio, Balkanaton, 1989

Contributing artist

- The Sensual World – Kate Bush (1989)
- The Red Shoes – Kate Bush (1993)
- The Rough Guide to the Music of Eastern Europe (1999, World Music Network)
