= Moments of Pleasure =

Kate Bush song

Single by Kate Bush

from the album The Red Shoes
- B-side: "Moments of Pleasure" (instrumental); "Home for Christmas"; "Show a Little Devotion"; "December Will Be Magic Again"; "Experiment IV"
- Released: 15 November 1993
- Studio: Abbey Road Studios (London, England)
- Length: 5:19
- Label: EMI
- Songwriter: Kate Bush
- Producer: Kate Bush

Kate Bush singles chronology
"Rubberband Girl" (1993)	"Moments of Pleasure" (1993)	"The Red Shoes" (1994)

Music video
- "Moments of Pleasure" on YouTube

"Moments of Pleasure" is a song written, produced, and recorded by the English musician Kate Bush, released in November 1993 by EMI Records as the third single from Bush's seventh studio album, The Red Shoes (1993). The song peaked at No. 26 and spent 3 weeks on the UK singles chart.

== Composition ==
In this song, Bush remembers friends and family who have died, including her aunt Maureen, dancer Gary Hurst (Bubba), guitarist Alan Murphy (Smurph), Abbey Road sound engineer John Barrett (Teddy), film director Michael Powell, and lighting engineer Bill Duffield. Composer and musician Michael Kamen arranged and conducted the orchestra, expanding on Bush's original piano accompaniment. Bush wrote the chorus "to those we love, to those who will survive" for her mother, who was sick at the time of recording. She died a short time later. The Director's Cut version features the chorus without lyrics.

== Critical reception ==
In his review of the song, Ben Thompson from The Independent remarked, "A smile and a tear from the Welling siren." Chris Roberts of Melody Maker said, "'Moments of Pleasure' is The Big Literary Effort, Kate at her very tremble-inducing, vocal-range-like-the-Pyrenees best." Alan Jones from Music Week gave the song a four out of five and named it Pick of the Week, writing, "Beautiful and traditional Bush fare with expansive orchestrations, poignant vocals and off-her-trolley lyrics. As subtle as 'Rubberband Girl' was direct, and probably as big a hit."

Terry Staunton from NME commented that "her personal exorcisms reach new heights on 'Moments of Pleasure', a deceptively simple ballad with a swooping chorus and a coda where she namechecks the people who've been important to her over years. It's a song that may baffle the world at large, but it wasn't written for us; Kate's just decided to share it." Pan-European magazine Music & Media noted, "For most singers a ballad is just a slow song, but for Bush it seems like it has to be an emotional confrontation which classic composers would like to be credited for."

== B-sides ==
Prior to its inclusion in The Other Side 2, part of the 2018 Remastered collection, B-side "Show a Little Devotion" was one of Bush's more elusive songs, only appearing on a small handful of CD singles that were released just prior to Christmas 1993. The version of "December Will Be Magic Again" that appears on this release is slightly different from all the other mixes previously released. It is essentially the same as the original single mix, but it is brighter, and the percussion instruments are different. The CD release also includes "Experiment IV" which was released in 1986. The 12-inch and cassette releases contain an instrumental version of "Moments of Pleasure", which has yet to be released on CD, and a third track entitled "Home for Christmas", which was also released on the US "Rubberband Girl", CD single. This was the first and only Kate Bush single (that received a physical release) not to be issued on 7-inch vinyl in the United Kingdom.

== Track listings ==
12-inch
No.	Title	Length
1.	"Moments of Pleasure"	5:13
2.	"Moments of Pleasure" (instrumental)	5:13
3.	"Home for Christmas"	1:44

CD
No.	Title	Length
1.	"Moments of Pleasure"	5:19
2.	"Show a Little Devotion"	4:18
3.	"December Will Be Magic Again"	4:48
4.	"Experiment IV"	4:23

Collectors CD box set (includes four colour prints)
No.	Title	Length
1.	"Moments of Pleasure"	5:19
2.	"December Will Be Magic Again"	4:48
3.	"Experiment IV"	4:23

Cassette
No.	Title	Length
1.	"Moments of Pleasure"
2.	"Moments of Pleasure" (instrumental)

== Personnel ==
- Kate Bush – vocals, piano
- Michael Kamen – orchestral arrangements

== Charts ==
Chart (1993–1994)	Peak position
Australia (ARIA)	119
Europe (Eurochart Hot 100)	38
UK Singles (OCC)	26
UK Airplay (Music Week)	33
