= The Red Shoes (album) =

Studio album by Kate Bush
- Released: 1 November 1993
- Recorded: June 1990–June 1993
- Studios: Kate Bush's Home Studio] and Abbey Road (London)
- Genre: Pop rock • art pop
- Length: 55:30
- Labels: EMI, Columbia (US)
- Producer: Kate Bush

Kate Bush chronology
This Woman's Work: Anthology 1978–1990 (1990)	The Red Shoes (1993)	Live at Hammersmith Odeon (1994)

Singles from The Red Shoes
- 1. "Rubberband Girl" Released: 6 September 1993; 2. "Eat the Music" Released: 7 September 1993 (US); 3. "Moments of Pleasure" Released: 15 November 1993; 4. "The Red Shoes" Released: 5 April 1994; 5. "And So Is Love" Released: 31 October 1994

The Red Shoes is the seventh studio album by English musician Kate Bush. Released on 1 November 1993, it was accompanied by Bush's short film, The Line, the Cross and the Curve, and was her last album before a 12-year hiatus.

The album peaked at number two on the UK Albums Chart and has been certified platinum by the British Phonographic Industry (BPI), denoting shipments in excess of 300,000 copies. In the United States, the album reached number 28 on the Billboard 200, her highest-peaking album on the chart at the time.

In November 2018, Bush released box sets of remasters of her studio albums, including a new remaster The Red Shoes. "Eat the Music" was re-released on a 10" vinyl record for Record Store Day in April 2024, featuring B-sides "Lily" and "Big Stripey Lie" from the original album. The song charted at No. 77 on the UK Singles Midweek Update dated 22 April 2024.

== Overview ==
The Red Shoes was inspired by the 1948 film of the same name by Michael Powell and Emeric Pressburger, which itself was inspired by the fairy tale of the same name by Hans Christian Andersen. It concerns a dancer, possessed by her art, who cannot take off the eponymous shoes and find peace.

Bush had suffered a series of bereavements during the making of The Red Shoes, including the loss of her mother, Hannah, who died in 1992 and the death of her guitarist, Alan Murphy. Bush's long-term relationship with bassist Del Palmer had ended, although the pair continued to work together. "I've been very affected by these last two years", she remarked in late 1991. "They've been incredibly intense years for me. Maybe not on a work level, but a lot has happened to me. I feel I've learnt a lot – and, yes, I think [my next album] is going to be quite different... I hope the people that are waiting for it feel it's worth the wait."

The Red Shoes featured more high-profile cameo appearances than her previous efforts. The track "Why Should I Love You?" featured instrumental and vocal contributions from Prince as well as guest vocals from comedian Lenny Henry. Trio Bulgarka (who had contributed to The Sensual World) appeared on three songs: "You're the One", "The Song of Solomon", and "Why Should I Love You?". "And So Is Love" features guitar work by Eric Clapton; Gary Brooker (from the band Procol Harum) and Jeff Beck also participated in the recording sessions.

The album was recorded digitally, and Bush has since expressed regrets about the results of this, which is why she revisited seven of the songs using analogue tape for her 2011 album Director's Cut, as well as releasing a remastered version of The Red Shoes in 2011, based on the master from an analogue backup tape.

Bush had suggested she might tour in support of The Red Shoes and deliberately aimed for a "live band" feel, with less of the studio trickery that had typified her last three albums. The tour did not materialise. Bush performed "Lily" and "Top of the City" live for the first time in 2014 as part of the Before the Dawn concert residency.

== Release ==
Music Week reported that that album would be released by EMI on 1 November and be accompanied by national press campaign that would include posters, window displays, and television advertisements. Certain record shops throughout the UK such as HMV also played the album in advance of its release.

A short film, The Line, the Cross and the Curve, written and directed by Bush, and starring herself and English actress Miranda Richardson, was released in 1993. It featured six songs from the album: "Rubberband Girl", "And So Is Love", "The Red Shoes", "Moments of Pleasure", "Eat the Music" and "Lily". The first five were used as promo videos for the singles, though Bush recorded a separate video for the American release of "Rubberband Girl" (which is intercut with clips from The Line, the Cross and the Curve). The film was nominated for the Long Form Music Video at the 1996 Grammy Awards.

== Critical reception ==
Professional ratings
Review scores
Source	Rating
AllMusic	2/5 stars
Chicago Tribune	3.5/4 stars
Entertainment Weekly	B+
Los Angeles Times	2.5/4 stars
Mojo	4/5 stars
Music Week	4/5 stars
NME	9/10
Pitchfork	7.0/10
Q	3/5 stars
Rolling Stone	4/5 stars
Vox	7/10

Chris Roberts, writing for Melody Maker, praised The Red Shoes as "an utter masterpiece" and felt that, apart from the "misguided" "Eat the Music", Bush is "on form like the Bible is well-known" with an album of "heartbreakingly beautiful ballads" and the rest "sunrise and Santa Claus, miles of muses". Alan Jones of Music Week designated it as their album of the week in the 6 November 1993 edition of the publication. He called it a "strong album" with "tranquil moods" and "influences from Africa, South America and Europe clearly audible".

Terry Staunton of NME considered the "truly exceptional" album to be Bush's "most personal to date, yet also her most accessible". He said that it was "a more mixed bag" than the "semi-thematic collections" of her previous two albums, but added that the majority of the songs are "link[ed] by a sense of loss, in particular the loss of love and loved ones", despite being "often light-hearted musically".

== Track listing ==
All tracks are written by Kate Bush.

No.	Title	Length
1.	"Rubberband Girl"	4:42
2.	"And So Is Love"	4:16
3.	"Eat the Music"	5:08
4.	"Moments of Pleasure"	5:16
5.	"The Song of Solomon"	4:27
6.	"Lily"	3:51
7.	"The Red Shoes"	4:00
8.	"Top of the City"	4:14
9.	"Constellation of the Heart"	4:46
10.	"Big Stripey Lie"	3:32
11.	"Why Should I Love You?"	5:00
12.	"You're the One"	5:52
Total length:		55:30

== Personnel ==
- Kate Bush – vocals, keyboards (exc. 4), piano (4, 5, 8, 9), Fender Rhodes (5, 8, 12), bass guitar and guitar (10), co-arranger (11)
- Michael Kamen – orchestral arrangements
- Del Palmer – Fairlight programming, electronic drums
- Stuart Elliott – drums (1–3, 6–9, 11, 12), percussion (1, 3, 5, 7)
- John Giblin – bass guitar (1–3, 6, 8, 9, 12)
- Danny McIntosh – guitar (1, 5–9)
- Horn section (1, 3, 9, 11)
  - Nigel Hitchcock – tenor saxophone, baritone saxophone (1)
  - Steve Sidwell – trumpet, flugelhorn (11)
  - Paul Spong – trumpet
  - Neil Sidwell – trombone
- Gary Brooker – Hammond organ (2, 9, 12)
- Eric Clapton – guitar (2)
- Paddy Bush – vocals (3, 7, 9), valiha, singing bowls and fujara (6), musical bow, whistle and mandola (7)
- Justin Vali – valiha (3, 7), kabosy and vocals (3)
- Trio Bulgarka – vocals (5, 11, 12)
  - Dimitar Penev – vocal arrangements for Trio Bulgarka
- Charlie Morgan – percussion (5)
- Lily Cornford – narrator (6)
- Colin Lloyd Tucker – vocals (7, 9)
- Gaumont d'Olivera – bass guitar (7), drums, percussion and sound effects (10)
- Nigel Kennedy – violin (8, 10), viola (8)
- Prince – keyboards, guitar, bass guitar, vocals and co-arranger (11)
- Lenny Henry – vocals (11)
- Jeff Beck – guitar (12)

Production

- Kate Bush – producer
- Del Palmer – engineer, mixing
- Haydn Bendall – engineer
- Ian Cooper – mastering

== Charts ==
=== Weekly charts ===
Weekly chart performance for The Red Shoes
Chart (1993)	Peak position
Australian Albums (ARIA)	17
Austrian Albums (Ö3 Austria)	34
Canada Top Albums/CDs (RPM)	13
Danish Albums (Hitlisten)	8
Dutch Albums (Album Top 100)	23
European Albums (Music & Media)	6
Finnish Albums (Suomen virallinen lista)	4
French Albums (IFOP)	14
German Albums (Offizielle Top 100)	18
Irish Albums (IFPI)	10
Japanese Albums (Oricon)	24
New Zealand Albums (RMNZ)	30
Swedish Albums (Sverigetopplistan)	16
Swiss Albums (Schweizer Hitparade)	26
UK Albums (Official Charts)	2
US Billboard 200	28

Weekly chart performance for The Red Shoes
Chart (2014)	Peak position
UK Albums (Official Charts)	49

2018 chart performance for The Red Shoes
Chart (2018)	Peak position
UK Album Sales Chart	97
UK Vinyl Albums	14

Weekly chart performance for The Red Shoes
Chart (2022)	Peak position
UK Album Downloads (Official Charts)	91

=== Year-end charts ===
Year-end chart performance for The Red Shoes
Chart (1993)	Position
Canada Top Albums/CDs (RPM)	77
UK Albums (OCC)	32

== Certifications and sales ==
Certifications and sales for The Red Shoes
Region	Certification	Certified units/sales
Canada (Music Canada)	Gold	50,000^{^}
Japan	—	25,510
United Kingdom (BPI)	Platinum	300,000^{^}
United States	—	298,000
^{^} Shipments figures based on certification alone.
