= The Sensual World =

1989 studio album by Kate Bush

Studio album by Kate Bush
- Released: 16 October 1989
- Recorded: September 1987 – July 1989
- Studios: Wickham Farm Home (Welling, England); Windmill Lane (Dublin, Ireland); Angel (Islington, England)
- Genre: Progressive pop
- Length: 42:10
- Labels: EMI, Columbia (US)
- Producer: Kate Bush

Kate Bush chronology
The Whole Story (1986)	The Sensual World (1989)	Aspects of the Sensual World (1990)

Singles from The Sensual World
- 1. "The Sensual World" Released: 18 September 1989; 2. "This Woman's Work" Released: 20 November 1989; 3. "Love and Anger" Released: 26 February 1990

The Sensual World is the sixth studio album by the English singer-songwriter Kate Bush, released on 16 October 1989 by EMI Records. It entered and peaked at No. 2 on the UK Albums Chart and has been certified Platinum by the British Phonographic Industry (BPI) for shipments in excess of 300,000 in the United Kingdom, and Gold by the Recording Industry Association of America (RIAA) in the United States.

== Overview ==
Bush drew inspiration for the title track from the modernist novel Ulysses by James Joyce. Bush realised that Molly Bloom's soliloquy, the closing passage of the novel, fitted the music she had created. When the Joyce estate refused to release the text, Bush wrote original lyrics that echo the original passage, as Molly steps from the pages of the book and revels in the real world. She also alluded to "Jerusalem" by William Blake in a reference to the song's gestation ("And my arrows of desire rewrite the speech"). The song includes Irish instrumentation (uilleann pipes, fiddle, whistle) under a breathy rendering of the orgasmic 'Yes' of the original text.

The songs "Deeper Understanding", "Never Be Mine", and "Rocket's Tail" all feature backing vocals by the Bulgarian vocal ensemble Trio Bulgarka. "Heads We're Dancing" includes a characteristic Mick Karn fretless bassline. The song "This Woman's Work" from the romantic comedy film She's Having a Baby (1988) was re-recorded and re-edited for this album. On 27 November 2005 it was featured in the British TV drama Walk Away and I Stumble starring Tamzin Outhwaite. Due to that broadcast, the song reached No. 3 on the UK Singles Downloads Chart in late 2005. This song has also been used in a long-running UK television advert for the National Society for the Prevention of Cruelty to Children, broadcast between 2005 and 2008, and in the Extras Christmas Special in 2007. A version of the song was recorded by R&B artist Maxwell in 1997 for his MTV Unplugged EP.

This also marks the final studio album to feature Bush's longtime guitarist Alan Murphy before his death three days after the album's release, though he would appear posthumously on Bush's cover of "Rocket Man" for an Elton John tribute album.

Released as CD players were becoming increasingly popular, the original LP ended with "This Woman's Work", while "Walk Straight Down the Middle" was included as a bonus track on the CD and cassette versions of the album. The gap between these two tracks is slightly longer to indicate the album was intended to finish with "This Woman's Work". "Walk Straight Down the Middle" later appeared on the compilation The Other Sides.

A video collection called The Sensual World: The Videos was also released. It contained videos for the title song, "Love and Anger", and "This Woman's Work" (all directed by Bush herself), as well as excerpts from an interview Bush gave to the music TV channel VH1.

In May 2011, Bush released the album Director's Cut, which featured new versions of four songs from The Sensual World, including the title song, now called "Flower of the Mountain". Finally having received permission from the Joyce estate, Bush recorded a new vocal using Molly Bloom's soliloquy as the lyric. Additionally, she re-recorded a sparse, piano-only version of "This Woman's Work". The new version of "Deeper Understanding" was released as a single, with an accompanying video.

The live version of "Never Be Mine" was included on her live album Before the Dawn, released in 2016. Although not performed before a live audience, it was part of the set list when the show was recorded without an audience for a possible video release. To date, no official video of Before the Dawn has been released.

In November 2018, Bush released box sets of remasters of her studio albums, including The Sensual World.

== Critical reception ==
Professional ratings
Review scores
Source	Rating
AllMusic	4.5/5 stars
Chicago Tribune	3/4 stars
Los Angeles Times	4/5 stars
Mojo	4/5 stars
NME	9/10
Pitchfork	9.4/10
Q	4/5 stars
The Rolling Stone Album Guide	4/5 stars
Spin Alternative Record Guide	8/10
The Village Voice	B

"While Bush's famously fey voice would probably be enough to hold the disparate strands of The Sensual World together, the album takes its cue and colouring too from the hypnotically sinuous sway of the pipes on the title track," wrote Robert Sandall in Q. "There are some strapping power chords to be despatched here and there, most notably on Love And Anger, but the dominant mood is of Oriental reverie, similar in feel to that achieved latterly by Japan. And in fact the last track on side one, Heads We're Dancing, reproduces that mysteriously sproingy bass sound favoured by Mick Karn."

In 1990, Bush received two nominations at the 10th Brit Awards in the categories Best British Producer and Best British Female. At the 33rd Grammy Awards held the following year, The Sensual World was nominated for Best Alternative Music Album.

Slant Magazine ranked The Sensual World at No. 55 on its 2012 list of the best albums of the 1980s, writing, "Blessed with one of music's most wildly expressive voices, Bush takes each song further than she has to, resulting in an album that forms its own unique world."

== Comments from other musicians ==
In December 1989, Robert Smith of the Cure chose "The Sensual World" as his favourite single of the year, The Sensual World as his favourite album of the year, and included "all of Kate Bush" in his list of "the best things about the Eighties". Charli XCX named The Sensual World as one of the records that defines her.

== Track listing ==
All tracks are written by Kate Bush.

Side one
No.	Title	Length
1.	"The Sensual World"	3:57
2.	"Love and Anger"	4:42
3.	"The Fog"	5:04
4.	"Reaching Out"	3:11
5.	"Heads We're Dancing"	5:17

Side two
No.	Title	Length
6.	"Deeper Understanding"	4:46
7.	"Between a Man and a Woman"	3:29
8.	"Never Be Mine"	3:43
9.	"Rocket's Tail"	4:06
10.	"This Woman's Work"	3:32

Bonus track on CD and cassette editions
No.	Title	Length
11.	"Walk Straight Down the Middle"	3:50
Total length:		45:57

== Personnel ==
Credits are adapted from The Sensual World liner notes.

- Kate Bush – vocals; piano; keyboards
- Del Palmer – Fairlight CMI percussion; bass guitar (1, 4, 7); rhythm guitar and percussion (5)
- Charlie Morgan – drums (1, 4, 6, 11)
- Stuart Elliott – drums (2, 3, 5, 7, 8, 9)
- Bill Whelan – arranger ("The Irish sessions")
- Paddy Bush – whip (swished fishing rod) (1), valiha and backing vocals (2), mandolin (4), tupan (6)
- Davy Spillane – uilleann pipes (1, 8), whistle (3)
- John Sheahan – fiddle (1)
- Dónal Lunny – bouzouki (1)
- John Giblin – bass guitar (2, 6, 9)
- David Gilmour – guitar (2, 9)
- Alan Murphy – guitar; guitar synthesizer (3, 5, 7)
- Jonathan Williams – cello (3, 5, 7)
- Nigel Kennedy – violin (3); viola (5)
- Michael Kamen – orchestral arrangements (3, 5, 10)
- Alan Stivell – Celtic harp (3, 7); backing vocals (7)
- "Dr. Bush" (Robert Bush, Kate's father) – dialogue (3)
- Balanescu Quartet – strings (4)
- Michael Nyman – string arrangement (Balanescu Quartet)
- Mick Karn – bass guitar (5)
- Trio Bulgarka – vocals (6, 8, 9)
- Yanka Rupkina (of Trio Bulgarka) – solo vocalist (6, 9)
- Dimitar Penev – arranger (Trio Bulgarka)
- Eberhard Weber – double bass (8, 11)

Production

- Kate Bush – producer
- Del Palmer – recording engineer, mixing (11)
- Haydn Bendall, Kevin Killen, Paul Gomazel – additional recording engineers
- Tom Leader – assistant engineer (Trio Bulgarka sessions)
- Andrew Boland – engineer ("The Irish sessions")
- John Grimes – assistant engineer ("The Irish sessions")
- Kevin Killen – mixing (1–10)
- Ian Cooper – mastering

== Charts ==
=== Weekly charts ===
Weekly chart performance for The Sensual World
Chart (1989)	Peak position
Australian Albums (ARIA)	30
Canada Top Albums/CDs (RPM)	14
Dutch Albums (Album Top 100)	16
European Albums (Music & Media)	6
Finnish Albums (Suomen virallinen lista)	3
French Albums (IFOP)	38
German Albums (Offizielle Top 100)	10
Japanese Albums (Oricon)	18
Italian Albums (Musica e dischi)	14
New Zealand Albums (RMNZ)	27
Norwegian Albums (VG-lista)	7
Swedish Albums (Sverigetopplistan)	17
Swiss Albums (Schweizer Hitparade)	11
UK Albums (Official Charts)	2
US Billboard 200	43

Weekly chart performance for The Sensual World
Chart (2014)	Peak position
UK Albums (Official Charts)	26

=== Year-end charts ===
Year-end chart performance for The Sensual World
Chart (1989)	Position
Canada Top Albums/CDs (RPM)	93
Dutch Albums (Album Top 100)	97
Norwegian Autumn Period Albums (VG-lista)	18
UK Albums (Gallup)	45

== Certifications and sales ==
Certifications and sales for The Sensual World
Region	Certification	Certified units/sales
Canada (Music Canada)	Gold	50,000^{^}
France (SNEP)	Gold	100,000^{*}
Japan	—	20,010
United Kingdom (BPI)	Platinum	330,000
United States (RIAA)	Gold	500,000^{^}
^{*} Sales figures based on certification alone.^{^} Shipments figures based on certification alone.

== The Sensual World: The Videos ==
The Sensual World: The Videos

Video by Kate Bush
- Released: 1990
- Recorded: 1989–1990
- Genre: Art rock
- Length: 16 minutes
- Label: CMV Enterprises
- Directors: Peter Richardson; Kate Bush

Kate Bush chronology
The Whole Story (1987)	The Sensual World: The Videos (1990)	The Line, the Cross and the Curve (1994)

Professional ratings
Review scores
Source	Rating
AllMovie	4/5 stars

=== Track listing ===
1. "Interview" – 0:36
2. "The Sensual World" – 5:15
3. "Love and Anger" – 4:43
4. "This Woman's Work" – 6:31

== See also ==
- List of 1980s albums considered the best
