= Rubberband Girl =

1993 single by Kate Bush

Single by Kate Bush

from the album The Red Shoes
- B-side: "Big Stripey Lie"
- Released: 6 September 1993
- Genre: Pop rock
- Length: 4:44
- Label: EMI United Kingdom
- Songwriter: Kate Bush
- Producer: Kate Bush

Kate Bush singles chronology
"Rocket Man (I Think It's Going to Be a Long, Long Time)" (1991)	"Rubberband Girl" (1993)	"Eat the Music" (1993)

Music video
- "Rubberband Girl" on YouTube

Music video
- "Rubberband Girl" (US version) on YouTube

"Rubberband Girl" is a song by English singer-songwriter Kate Bush released on 6 September 1993 by EMI United Kingdom. It was the lead single of her seventh album, The Red Shoes (1993). The single peaked at No. 12 on the UK Singles Chart and charted for five weeks. It was Bush's last top-20 hit in the UK until "King of the Mountain", which peaked at No. 4 in 2005. The song was a moderate success worldwide, reaching the top 40 in Australia, Ireland, the Netherlands and New Zealand. In the United States, it became Bush's third single to reach the Billboard Hot 100 chart, where it debuted and peaked at No. 88.

== Versions ==
Three versions of "Rubberband Girl" were released commercially: an LP version, an extended mix and a remix by American DJ Eric Kupper called the US Mix, which was released towards the end of 1994 on the "And So Is Love" single. The B-side is "Big Stripey Lie" in the UK and "Show a Little Devotion" in the US.

In 2011, Kate Bush recorded a new version of the song that was included on her ninth studio album, Director's Cut.

== Critical reception ==
Alan Jones from Music Week gave the song a score of four out of five and named it Pick of the Week, writing, "With Kate at the helm any single would be quirky but by her own otherwordly standards this is Ms. Bush at her most direct." He added, "It's a rhythmic, almost raunchy, workout with the occasional outburst of rock guitar, strange lyrics—'if I could twang like a rubberband, I'd be a rubberband girl' is as ordinary as it gets—and a weird vocal impression of said office accessory being stretched. It is also a very commercial rejoinder and will probably be Kate's first Top 10 solo hit since 'Running Up That Hill' hit the spot eight years ago."

Everett True of Melody Maker felt that the song is "a little too uptempo for my tastes" and noted that he prefers Bush when she is "all dreamy and mysterious". Despite this, he added, "It still has enough kookiness to draw me under, and she's still the only artist for whom the word 'kooky' isn't an insult." Another Melody Maker editor, Chris Roberts, praised it as "a gorgeous, daft, groovy single with a bassline to shame Bootsy Collins". Terry Staunton from NME wrote, "Kate's self-doubt emerges right from the beginning on 'Rubberband Girl', the relentless one-chord single where she wishes she could learn to give, learn to bounce back on her feet."

Billboard wrote that the song was "fun, funky, and full of appropriately flexible sounds, including the subtle vocal tricks Bush has made her calling card". Parry Gettelman from Orlando Sentinel said that "Bush waxes positively perky as she struggles to forge a 'Sledgehammer' out of a flimsy tune, dopey lyrics and bouncy dance-floor beat." Richard C. Walls from Rolling Stone noted the "pure pop" of "Rubberband Girl". Tom Doyle from Smash Hits also gave the song four out of five, saying that it's "a bit of a shock because she's gone all funky with Prince-ish drums all over the shop".

== Track listings ==
UK 7-inch single, UK and Canadian cassette single
No.	Title	Length
1.	"Rubberband Girl"
2.	"Big Stripey Lie"

UK 12-inch picture disc
No.	Title	Length
1.	"Rubberband Girl" (extended remix)
2.	"Rubberband Girl"
3.	"Big Stripey Lie"

UK CD single
No.	Title	Length
1.	"Rubberband Girl"
2.	"Rubberband Girl" (extended mix)
3.	"Big Stripey Lie"

US CD single
No.	Title	Length
1.	"Rubberband Girl"	4:42
2.	"Rubberband Girl" (extended mix)	7:07
3.	"Show a Little Devotion"	4:50
4.	"Home for Christmas"	1:45

US cassette single
No.	Title	Length
1.	"Rubberband Girl"
2.	"This Woman's Work"

== Personnel ==
- Kate Bush – vocals, keyboards
- Danny McIntosh – guitar
- John Giblin – bass guitar
- Stuart Elliott – drums, percussion
- Nigel Hitchcock – tenor and baritone saxophones
- Steve Sidwell – trumpet
- Paul Spong – trumpet
- Neil Sidwell – trombone

== Charts ==
Chart (1993)	Peak position
Australia (ARIA)	39
Belgium (Ultratop 50 Flanders)	47
Canada Retail Singles (The Record)	15
Canada Top Singles (RPM)	50
Canada Adult Contemporary (RPM)	21
Europe (Eurochart Hot 100)	29
Europe (European Hit Radio)	17
Germany (GfK)	65
Ireland (IRMA)	17
Italy (Musica e dischi)	22
Netherlands (Single Top 100)	37
New Zealand (Recorded Music NZ)	34
Quebec (ADISQ)	21
UK Singles (Official Charts)	12
UK Airplay (Music Week)	10
US Billboard Hot 100	88
US Alternative Airplay (Billboard)	7

== Release history ==
Region	Date	Format(s)	Label(s)	Ref.
United Kingdom	6 September 1993	7-inch vinyl; CD; cassette	EMI United Kingdom	
United Kingdom	13 September 1993	12-inch picture disc	EMI United Kingdom	
Australia	4 October 1993	CD; cassette	EMI United Kingdom	
Japan	1 November 1993	CD	EMI	
