= The Red Shoes (song) =

- CD single, part one

Single by Kate Bush

from the album The Red Shoes
- B-side: "You Want Alchemy"; "Shoedance" (The Red Shoes dance mix); "Running Up That Hill" (12-inch mix); "The Big Sky" (special single mix); "This Woman's Work"; "Cloudbusting" (video mix)
- Released: 5 April 1994
- Studio: Abbey Road Studios (London, England)
- Length: 4:02
- Label: EMI
- Songwriter: Kate Bush
- Producer: Kate Bush

Kate Bush singles chronology
"Moments of Pleasure" (1993)	"The Red Shoes" (1994)	"The Man I Love" (1994)

Music Video
- "The Red Shoes" on Vimeo

"The Red Shoes" is a song written, produced, and performed by English musician Kate Bush. It was released in April 1994 by EMI Records as the fourth single released from her seventh studio album, The Red Shoes (1993). The song peaked at No. 21 and spent 3 weeks on the UK Singles Chart while peaking at No. 54 on the Eurochart Hot 100.

== Background and content ==
The song is about a girl who puts on a pair of enchanted ballet slippers and can't stop dancing until she breaks the spell. It is inspired by a character in the Michael Powell and Emeric Pressburger film The Red Shoes. Speaking to Melody Maker in 1993, Bush revealed, "It's just taking the idea of these shoes that have a life of their own. If you're unfortunate enough to put them on, you're going to dance and dance. It's almost like the idea that you're possessed by dance. Before I had any lyrics, the rhythm of the music led me to the image of, oh, horses, something that was running forward, and that led me to the image of the dancing shoes. Musically, I was trying to get a sense of delirium, of something very circular and hypnotic, but building and building."

== Release ==
"The Red Shoes" was released on 7-inch vinyl, cassette, and CD on 5 April 1994. "You Want Alchemy" is the B-side song on all formats except the second part of the CD single. The second part of the CD single was released six days after the first part and features a 10-minute remix by Karl Blagan of "The Red Shoes", renamed "Shoedance", as well as remixes of "The Big Sky" and "Running Up That Hill".

== Critical reception ==
Chris Roberts from Melody Maker said, "'The Red Shoes' meets its jigging ambition and sticks a flag on top, making her dance till her legs fall off." Another Melody Maker editor, Peter Paphides, commented, "Only as a grown-up will I be able to fully apprehend the texture and allegorical resonance of the themes dealt with in 'The Red Shoes'. Until then, I'll content myself with Tori Amos and Edie Brickell." Alan Jones from Music Week gave it a score of four out of five, adding, "The third single from the album of the same name is not one of Bush's more commercial 45s. Although both rhythmic and literate, it is not the stuff of which Top 10 singles are made." Parry Gettelman from Orlando Sentinel wrote, "The mandola, the whistles and various curious instruments on the driving title track really recall the fever-dream quality of the 1948 ballet film The Red Shoes, the album's namesake." Mark Sutherland from Smash Hits gave it two out of five, adding that "loads of spooky 'ethnic' noises and tribal beats make for a very weird single, but not a very good one."

== Track listings ==
All tracks are written by Kate Bush.

7-inch and cassette single
No.	Title	Length
1.	"The Red Shoes"
2.	"You Want Alchemy"

CD1
No.	Title	Length
1.	"The Red Shoes"	4:02
2.	"You Want Alchemy"	4:22
3.	"Cloudbusting" (video mix)	6:57
4.	"This Woman's Work"	3:32

CD2
No.	Title	Length
1.	"Shoedance" (The Red Shoes dance mix)	10:08
2.	"The Big Sky" (special single mix)	4:40
3.	"Running Up That Hill" (12-inch version)	5:43

== Personnel ==
- Kate Bush – lead and backing vocals, keyboards
- Paddy Bush – mandola, tin whistle, musical bow, backing vocals
- Del Palmer – Fairlight CMI programming
- Danny McIntosh – guitar
- Gaumont d'Olivera – bass guitar
- Stuart Elliott – drums, percussion
- Colin Lloyd Tucker – backing vocals

== Charts ==
Chart (1994)	Peak position
Europe (Eurochart Hot 100)	54
UK Singles (OCC)	21
UK Airplay (Music Week)	26
