= When the Night Falls... Do You Hear Me? =

When The Night Falls... Do You Hear (Me)?

Studio album by Valen Hsu
- Released: November 10, 2011
- Genre: Mandopop
- Label: Valen Voice Production

Valen Hsu chronology
My Love Journey 1 km (2009)	When The Night Falls... Do You Hear (Me)? (2011)

When The Night Falls... Do You Hear (Me)? is the 15th album by Mandopop singer Valen Hsu that was released on 10 November 2011.

== Track listing ==
1. 夜．微醺 (Intro: When The Night Falls... (Instrumental))
2. 老实情歌 (The Honest Love Song)
3. 巴黎草莓 (Parisberries)
4. I Wanna Be Loved By You
5. 浪人情歌 (Wanderer's Love Song)
6. 只爱陌生人 (Comfort of Strangers)
7. 蓝色啤酒海 (Bottle Of Ocean Blue)
8. 春光乍洩 (Happy Together)
9. 祕密 (Secret)
10. 向前走(台语) (On My Way)
