= Them Heavy People =

- Japanese single cover

Single by Kate Bush

from the album The Kick Inside
- B-side: "The Man with the Child in His Eyes"
- Released: September 1978 (Japan)
- Recorded: 1977/79
- Studio: AIR Studios (London, England)
- Genre: Art pop; baroque pop
- Length: 3:05
- Label: EMI
- Songwriter: Kate Bush
- Producer: Andrew Powell

Kate Bush singles chronology
"Moving" (1978)	"Them Heavy People" (1978)	"The Man with the Child in His Eyes" (1978)

Music video
- "Them Heavy People" on YouTube

"Them Heavy People" is a song written and recorded by Kate Bush, from her debut album The Kick Inside. It was issued as a single in Japan only with the title "Rolling the Ball" reaching number 3, its only release worldwide as an A-side.

The song expresses an insistent desire to learn as much as possible, while she is still young. It includes references to religion, and the teachings of Jesus and Gurdjieff, among others.

A Seiko logo appears on the insert's back side, which makes it Bush's only commercial release featuring any kind of product endorsement. Bush also appeared in TV commercials and print ads for the brand in Japan.

A live recording of this song was the lead track on the On Stage EP which reached number 10 in the UK Singles Chart in 1979. In the Netherlands, the EP was listed as Them Heavy People in the Top 40 chart, making it basically an A-side. It peaked at number 17 in 1979.

Bush performed "Them Heavy People" on several TV programmes including her only appearance on Saturday Night Live in the US and the short-lived Revolver in Britain.

The song was parodied in a performance by Pamela Stephenson in an episode of Not the Nine O'Clock News in a version titled "Oh England – My Leotard".

== Charts ==
Chart performance for "Them Heavy People"
Chart (1979)	Peak position
Netherlands (Dutch Top 40)	21
