= Kite (Kate Bush song) =

Song by Kate Bush

from the album The Kick Inside
- A-side: "Wuthering Heights"
- Released: 20 January 1978
- Studio: AIR Studios (London, England)
- Genre: Progressive rock; psychedelic rock; reggae rock
- Length: 2:56
- Label: EMI Records
- Songwriter(s): Kate Bush
- Producer(s): Andrew Powell

"Kite" is the fourth track from Kate Bush's 1978 album, The Kick Inside. It was also the B-side to her first single, "Wuthering Heights", released on 20 January 1978. The verses feature a reggae style.

== Composition ==
"Kite" features two modulations created through using the ♭VII or subtonic as a pivot.
