= Tear Sea =

Studio album by Valen Hsu
- Released: 26 March 1996
- Genre: Mandopop
- Label: East Records (TW)

Valen Hsu chronology
Ingratiate (1995)	Tear Sea (1996)	The Cloud Knows? (1996)

Tear Sea or Lei Hai (淚海) is the second studio album by Mandopop singer Valen Hsu. It was released on 26 March 1996 and sold 300,000 copies in Taiwan.

== Track listing ==
1. Lei Hai (淚海; "Tear Sea")
2. Mimi (秘密; "Secret")
3. Si Ji (四季; "Four Seasons")
4. Fang Sheng Da Ku (放聲大哭; "Wailing") — Mandarin cover of Kate Bush's "Moving"
5. Mao Yu Gangqin (貓與鋼琴; "Cat and Piano")
6. Shalou (沙漏; "Hourglass")
7. Pian Ziji (騙自己; "Lie to Myself")
8. Houlai Ni Hao Ma (後來你好嗎; "Have You Been Well Since")
9. Women de Aiqing Bing le (我們的愛情病了; "Our Love is Ill")
10. Tian Liang le (天亮了; "It's Dawn")
