= Moving (Kate Bush song) =

- Japanese single cover

Single by Kate Bush

from the album The Kick Inside
- B-side: "Wuthering Heights"
- Released: 20 April 1978 (Japan)
- Recorded: August 1977
- Studio: AIR Studios (London, England)
- Genre: Art pop; baroque pop
- Length: 3:20 (single)
- Label: Toshiba EMI
- Songwriter: Kate Bush
- Producer: Andrew Powell

Kate Bush singles chronology
"Wuthering Heights" (1978)	"Moving" (1978)	"Them Heavy People" (1978)

Music video
- "Moving" on YouTube

"Moving" is a song written and recorded by English singer-songwriter Kate Bush for her debut album, The Kick Inside (1978). It was released as a single only in Japan in April 1978 by EMI Music Japan. Written by Bush and produced by Andrew Powell, the song is a tribute to Lindsay Kemp, her mime teacher. "Moving" opens with whale song sampled from Songs of the Humpback Whale, an LP including recordings of whale vocalisations made by Dr. Roger S. Payne.

Bush performed "Moving" at Tokyo Music Festival, on BBC's Saturday Nights at the Mill, on a Dutch TV show set in Efteling park and on her first tour, The Tour of Life (1979).

== Background ==
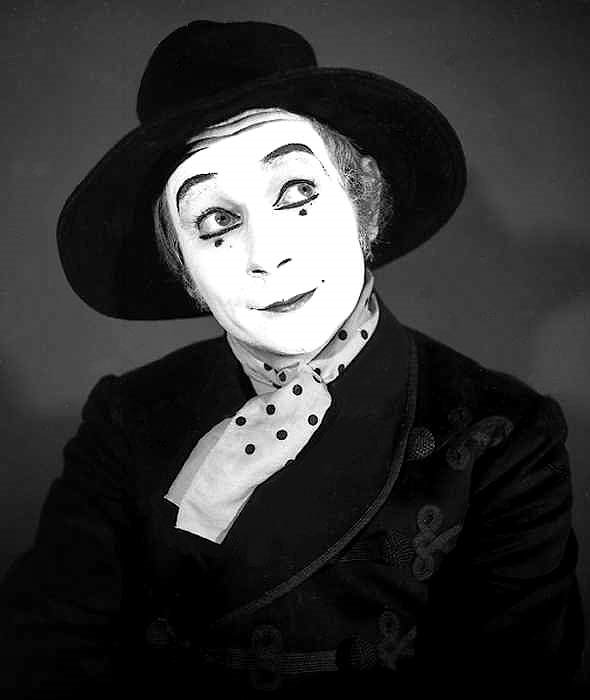
Lindsay Kemp was the main inspiration behind the song.

Kate Bush signed a contract with EMI Records in her late teens. Between recording demos with Gilmour as producer and releasing her first album she pursued her studies and gained maturity in her writing. After seeing an advertisement for Lindsay Kemp's Flowers spectacle, she decided to take mime classes with him. Six months later, she took modern dance classes with Anthony Van Laast. Bush began recording her debut album, The Kick Inside, in 1977. She wrote "Moving" the same year as a tribute to Kemp. "He needed a song written to him," she said in an interview. "He opened up my eyes to the meanings of movement. He makes you feel so good. If you've got two left feet it's 'you dance like an angel, darling.' He fills people up, you're an empty glass and glug, glug, glug, he's filled you with champagne." "Moving" was only released as a single in Japan, with "Wuthering Heights" as the B-side in order to promote The Kick Inside. The single was released on 6 February 1978.

== Composition ==
"Moving"
A sample of the final chorus and coda.

"Moving" follows a chord progression of Dm–C–B♭–F in the verses and Dm–Am–Dm–Am in the choruses. Written in the key of D minor, the song is set in common time with a "slowly" tempo. Its instrumentation includes drums, bass, guitars and electric piano. "Moving" opens with fifteen seconds of whale song sampled from Songs of the Humpback Whale, an LP of recordings made by Dr. Roger S. Payne of whale vocalisations. In an interview with the magazine Sounds, Bush commented, "Whales say everything about 'moving'. It's huge and beautiful, intelligent, soft inside a tough body. It weighs a ton and yet it's so light it floats. It's the whole thing about human communication —'moving liquid, yet you are just as water'— what the Chinese say about being the cup the water moves in to. The whales are pure movement and pure sound, calling for something, so lonely and sad ..."

== Reception ==
AllMusic and Billboard have considered "Moving" one of the best songs on The Kick Inside. As "Moving" was only released in Japan, sales and commercial performance were limited. The song failed to chart on the Japanese Oricon Singles Chart.

== Live performances ==
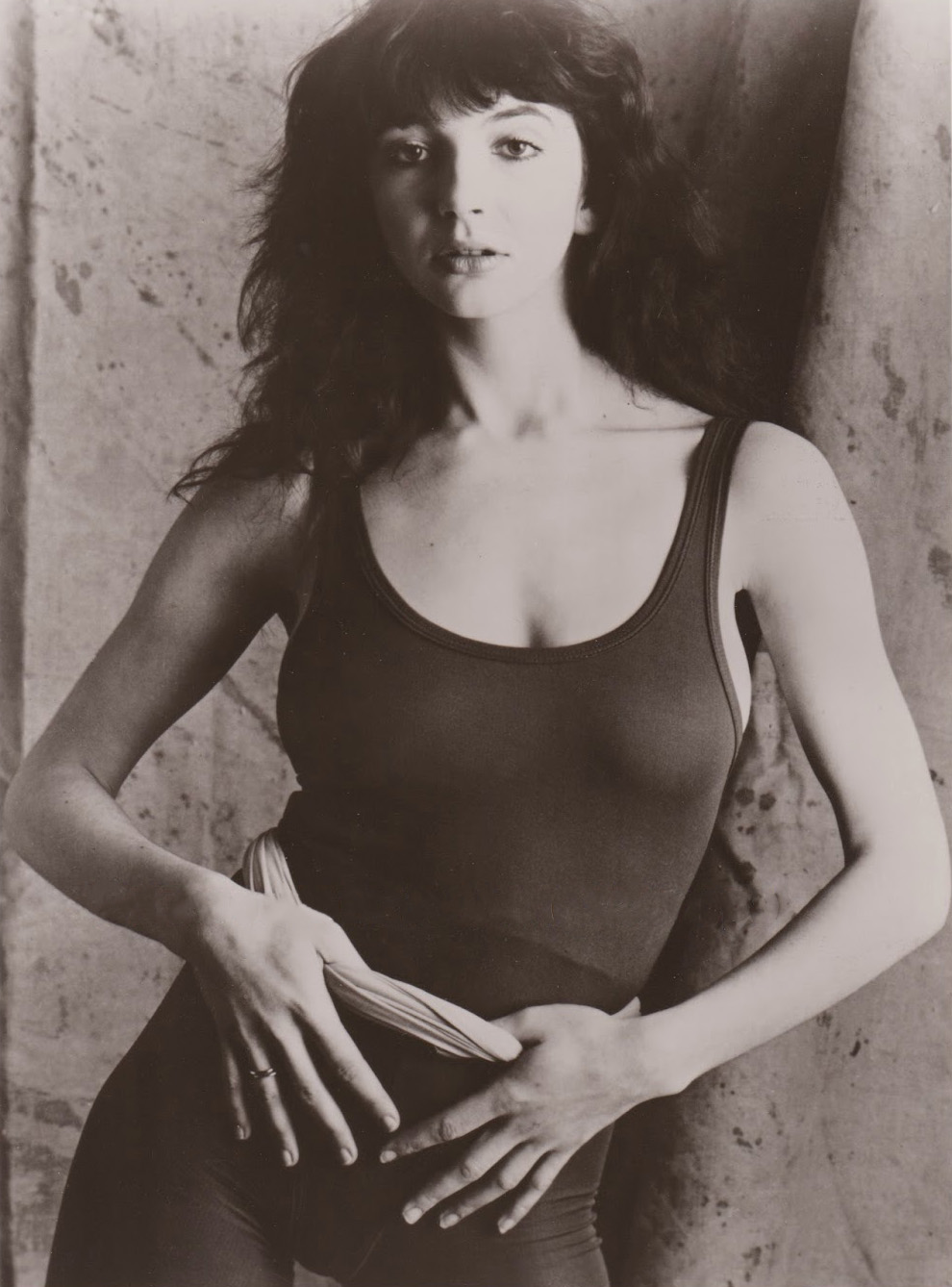
Bush in 1978

Soon after the release of The Kick Inside, Bush performed "Moving" alongside "Them Heavy People" on 25 February 1978 on the BBC's show Saturday Nights at the Mill. On 12 May, she took part in a Dutch special TV show dedicated to the opening of the Haunted Castle, the new attraction of the amusement park Efteling. She performed six songs in six videos filmed near the castle and across the park. At the beginning of the "Moving" video, the camera shows a tombstone covered with leaves. Then, the wind blows the leaves away to reveal Bush's name. She performs the song in front of the castle's door. In June 1978, Bush sang "Moving" at Nippon Budokan during the Tokyo Music Festival. The performance was aired on Japanese television on 21 June when it was watched by 35 million viewers. She won the silver prize alongside the American R&B band The Emotions. In 1979, Bush included "Moving" on her first tour, The Tour of Life. Her performance is viewable on the video Live at Hammersmith Odeon. However, Bush did not perform the song on her residency show Before the Dawn (2014).

== Track listing ==
7-inch vinyl single

1. "Moving" – 3:20
2. "Wuthering Heights" – 4:30

== Credits ==
Credits adapted from The Kick Inside liner notes.

- Kate Bush – songwriting, vocals
- Andrew Powell – production
- Stuart Elliott – drums
- David Paton – bass
- Ian Bairnson – guitar
- Duncan Mackay – electric piano

== Cover versions ==
Mandopop singer Valen Hsu covered the song on her 1996 album Tear Sea, titled "Fang Sheng Da Ku" (放聲大哭; "Wailing").

== Bibliography ==
- Bolton, Cecil (1987), Kate Bush Complete, EMI Music Publishing, ISBN 0-86175-413-1
- Mendelssohn, John (2010), Waiting for Kate Bush, Omnibus Press, ISBN 978-0-85712-323-7
- Moy, Dr. Ron (2013), Kate Bush and Hounds of Love, Ashgate Publishing, Ltd., ISBN 978-1-4094-9370-9
- Vermorel, Fred (1983), The Secret History of Kate Bush, Omnibus Press, ISBN 0-7119-0152-X
