= The Man with the Child in His Eyes =

Single by Kate Bush

from the album The Kick Inside
- B-side: "Moving"
- Released: 26 May 1978
- Recorded: June 1975
- Studio: AIR (London, UK)
- Genre: Progressive pop; folk
- Length: 2:52 (Single mix); 2:40 (LP mix)
- Label: EMI
- Songwriter: Kate Bush
- Producers: Andrew Powell, David Gilmour

Kate Bush singles chronology
"Moving" (1978)	"The Man with the Child in His Eyes" (1978)	"Hammer Horror" (1978)

Music video
- "The Man with the Child in His Eyes" on YouTube

"The Man with the Child in His Eyes" is a song by Kate Bush. It is the fifth track on her debut album The Kick Inside and was released as her second single, on the EMI label, in May 1978. The single peaked at No. 6 and spent 11 weeks on the UK singles chart.

== Background ==
Bush wrote the song when she was 13 and recorded it at the age of 16. It was recorded at AIR Studios in London, in June 1975 under the guidance of David Gilmour. She has said that recording with a large orchestra at that age terrified her.

Bush said in a 1979 interview on Multi-Coloured Swap Shop, when asked about the meaning of the song:

It's something I feel about men generally... a lot of men have got a child inside them... that they're more or less just grown-up kids... it's a very good quality... because a lot of women grow up and get far too responsible, and it's really nice to keep that delight in wonderful things that children have, and that's what I was trying to say, that this man can communicate with a younger girl because he's on the same level.

== Release ==
The song was Bush's second chart single in the United Kingdom, where it reached number six in the summer of 1978. In the United States, the single was released in December of the same year. It became her first single to reach the Billboard pop singles chart, peaking at number 85 early in 1979. Bush performed this song in her one appearance on Saturday Night Live, singing on a piano being played by Paul Shaffer.

== Composition ==
The single version slightly differs from the album version. On the single, the song opens with the phrase "he’s here!" and laughter echoing, an effect added after the album was released.

According to the sheet music published in Musicnotes.com by EMI Music Publishing, the song is set in the time signature of common time, with a moderate tempo of 88 beats per minute. It is written in the key of E minor.

In 2010, former radio and television presenter Steve Blacknell, Bush's first boyfriend, offered the original hand-written lyrics for the song for sale through music memorabilia website 991.com. The lyrics were written "in hot pink felt tip, complete with Kate Bush's own little pink circles in place of dots over the "I"'s."

Bush has never stated who she wrote the song about, but Blacknell has stated that a person close to Bush had told him the song was written about him. It had long been assumed it was about Gilmour.

== Reception ==
The song received the Ivor Novello Award for "Outstanding British Lyric" in 1979.

Record Business designated "The Man With the Child in His Eyes" their single of the week in their 15 May 1978 edition of the publication. They called it "another distinctively original high-quality song" that was "bound to have an immediate impact" on the charts. The publication also believed that it lacked some of the "differentness" of Bush's previous single, "Wuthering Heights". Amy Hanson of AllMusic called it a "simple ballad", adding that "beautiful and slow and just over two and a half minutes long, the song lets pauses fall where needed and a never rushed melody unfolds as it will, culminating in a brief piece that is complex despite its utter simplicity."

== Track listing ==
7" single (EMI 2806) (UK)

1. "The Man with the Child in His Eyes" – 2:42
2. "Moving" – 3:06

== Charts ==
Chart (1978-79)	Peak position
Australia (Kent Music Report)	22
Ireland (IRMA)	3
Netherlands (Dutch Top 40)	27
Netherlands (Single Top 100)	23
New Zealand (Recorded Music NZ)	23
UK Singles (Official Charts)	6
US Billboard Hot 100	85

Chart (2022)	Peak position
UK Singles Downloads (Official Charts)	76

== Certifications ==
Region	Certification	Certified units/sales
United Kingdom (BPI)	Silver	200,000^{‡}
^{‡} Sales+streaming figures based on certification alone.
