= Lindsay Kemp =

British dancer, actor and mime (1938–2018)

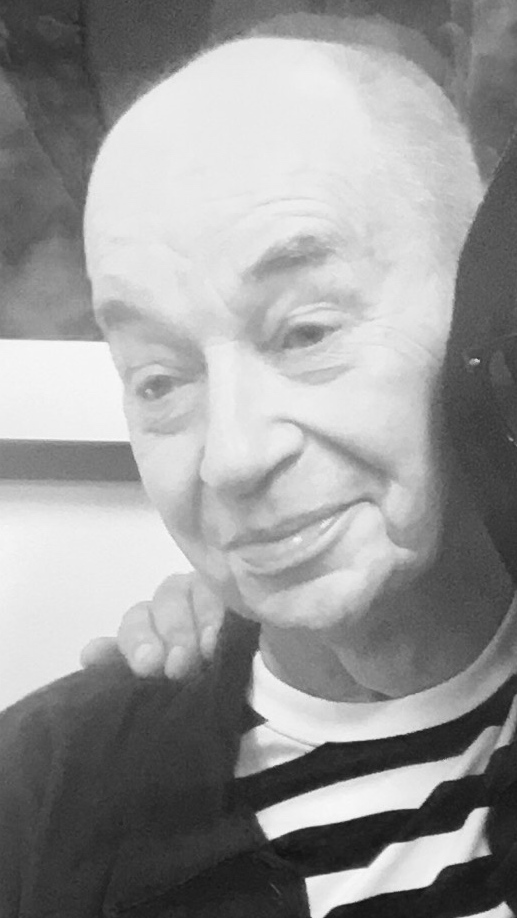
- Kemp in 2016
- Born: Lindsay Keith Kemp; 3 May 1938; Birkenhead, England
- Died: 24 August 2018 (aged 80); Livorno, Italy
- Known for: Dance, actor, mime artist
- Website: lindsaykemp.eu

Lindsay Keith Kemp (3 May 1938 – 24 August 2018) was a British dancer, actor, teacher, mime artist, and choreographer.

He was probably best known for his 1974 flagship production of Flowers, a mime and music show based on Jean Genet's novel Our Lady of the Flowers, in which he played the lead role of Divine. Owing to its gay themes and perceived decadence, reviews were sometimes hostile, but it was widely considered a theatrical and sensory sensation, and it toured globally for many years. Kemp appeared in films roles in The Wicker Man (1973), Derek Jarman's Sebastiane (1976) and Jubilee (1977) the Kate Bush short film The Line, the Cross & the Curve (1994) and Todd Haynes' Velvet Goldmine (1998). He was also a mentor to David Bowie and Kate Bush.

== Early life ==
Kemp was born in his parental home, 'Tyneholme', Coombe Road, in Irby, Wirral, but grew up in South Shields, near Newcastle upon Tyne. His father, a seaman, was lost at sea in 1940. According to Kemp, he danced from early childhood: "I'd dance on the kitchen table to entertain the neighbours. I mean, it was a novelty in South Shields to see a little boy in full make-up dancing on pointe. Finally it got a bit too much for my mother, and she decided to send me to boarding school at the age of eight, hoping that it would knock some sense into me." Kemp's mother moved away from South Shields, and Kemp attended Bearwood College, near Wokingham, Berkshire, a school for the sons of merchant seamen. He and his mother later moved to Bradford, Yorkshire, where Kemp attended Bradford Art College before studying dance with Hilde Holger and mime with Marcel Marceau. In the 1950s, Kemp did National Service in the RAF. In an interview with the BBC, he fondly remembered being shouted at for being unable to march properly due to his desire to dance.

== Dance career ==
Kemp played the Player Queen in the BBC's Shakespeare Quatercentenary production Hamlet at Elsinore (recorded at Elsinore castle in northeastern Denmark) in 1963, which starred Christopher Plummer. He formed his own dance company in the early sixties and first attracted attention with an appearance at the Edinburgh Festival in 1968 with Flowers based on Jean Genet's Notre Dame des Fleurs (Our Lady of the Flowers). Its extraordinary dream-like opening scene of prisoners masturbating in their cells, while the silhouette of a beautiful male angel walked slowly across the stage, his wings reaching almost to the top of the proscenium, established the tone.

Kemp's stage performances include Pierrot In Turquoise, Salome, Mr Punch's Pantomime, A Midsummer Night's Dream, Duende, Nijinsky, Alice, Cenerentola (Cinderella), Nijinsky il matto (1983) (translation: Nijinsky the fool) Façade, The Big Parade, Alice, Onnagata, Cinderella, Variété, Dream Dances, and, for Ballet Rambert, Parades Gone By (1975) and Cruel Garden (1977), most of these works in collaboration with composer Carlos Miranda. Variété was later produced by Youth Music Theatre UK at the Riverside Studios in 2013 and directed by Kinny Gardner.

During the early 1970s, Kemp was a popular and inspirational teacher of dance and mime. David Bowie, Kate Bush and Vivian Stanshall were students of Kemp. He staged and performed in Bowie's Ziggy Stardust concerts at London's Rainbow Theatre in August 1972, with Jack Birkett, and appears in the promotional video for Bowie's single "John, I'm Only Dancing", directed by Mick Rock. Bush later wrote the song "Moving", which appeared on her debut album The Kick Inside, as a tribute to Kemp. Bush also contributed vocals to Zaine Griff's song "Flowers", which is also a tribute to Kemp.

Kemp's film roles include a supporting role in the Kate Bush short film The Line, the Cross & the Curve (1994), a dancer and cabaret performer in Derek Jarman's Sebastiane (1976) and Jubilee (1977) respectively, a pantomime dame in Todd Haynes' Velvet Goldmine (1998) and the pub landlord Alder MacGregor in Anthony Shaffer's The Wicker Man (1973).

In the field of opera he occasionally produced works in Italy; Il Barbiere di Siviglia in Macerata in July 1995, Iris in Livorno in November 1998, and Die Zauberflöte in Jesi in November 1999. He returned to Livorno in November 2016 with a new production Die Zauberflöte in which he also designed the sets and costumes, as well as co-lighting the production. His last public performance in the United Kingdom was a collaboration with singer songwriter Tim Arnold at Manchester's Bridgewater Hall in a multimedia live arts installation of Arnold's song "What Love Would Want" in June 2018. In the seasons from 2005 to 2012 he plays the role of the fairy Carabosse in The Sleeping Beauty of the Italian company Balletto del Sud with the Fredy Franzutti's choreography. The collaboration with the company and with Franzutti also continues with the interpretation of the magician Kašej in The Firebird in the seasons from 2007 to 2010, the shows have been repeated in several Italian tours.

== Personal life ==
Kemp was gay. He was also rumoured to have had an affair with David Bowie, and their friendship was highly important in Bowie's artistic development. He left England in 1979 for Spain and then Italy. By 2002 he had homes in Rome and Todi, Perugia, in Italy.

== Death ==
Kemp died in Livorno, Italy, on 24 August 2018, aged 80. David Haughton, his closest friend and collaborator for 45 years, said Kemp had remained busy and active right until the end, saying "he suddenly said he felt ill, and a minute and a half later he was gone."

== Bibliography ==
- Lindsay Kemp - di David Haughton e Guido Harari - Editoriale Domus (1982)
- Sogni di luce. Lindsay Kemp - Giovanna Talà - Bandecchi & Vivaldi Editore (2012)
- Lindsay Kemp. Wednesday drawings - Peccolo Editore (2014)
- Lindsay Kemp Claudio Barontini. Disegni e fotografie - Vittorio Sgarbi - CAMeC - Centro Arte Moderna e Contemporanea (2018)

== Filmography ==
- The Vampire Lovers (1970), as Jester (scenes deleted)
- Savage Messiah (1972), as Angus Corky
- The Wicker Man (1973), as Alder MacGregor
- The Stud (1974), as Topstar
- Sebastiane (1976), as Dancer
- Valentino (1977), as Mortician
- Jubilee (1978), as Cabaret performer
- A Midsummer Night's Dream for TV (1985), as Puck
- Cartoline italiane (Italian Postcards) (1987)
- The Line, the Cross & the Curve (1993), as Guide
- Velvet Goldmine (1998), as Pantomime Dame
- Guest appearances in Spanish TV show La Mandrágora in 2005 and 2006
- Battle of Soho (2017), his last film performance
- David Bowie: Finding Fame (2019) as himself
- Lindsay Kemp Claudio Barontini. Drawings and photographs regia di Cristiana Cerrini - Art documentary (2020)

== Choreography ==
- Le Train Blue - in coöperation with Ben Holder, for Introdance, Netherlands
- "The Parades Gone By" - for Ballet Rambert, London, 1975 with music by Carlos Miranda
- "Cruel Garden" - for Ballet Rambert, London, 1977 with Christopher Bruce, Music by Carlos Miranda
