= The Most Wuthering Heights Day Ever =

Annual event recreating music video

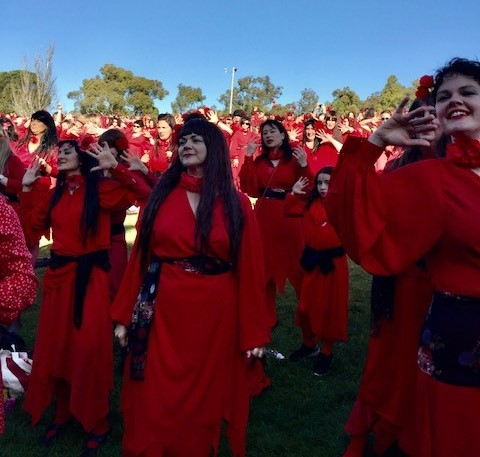
Fans at the Most Wuthering Heights Day Ever in Melbourne, Australia, 2016

The Most Wuthering Heights Day Ever is an event held at locations around the world where participants recreate the music video for musician Kate Bush's 1978 song "Wuthering Heights". The event's inspiration is Shambush's The Ultimate Kate Bush Experience, which took place in 2013 in Brighton, United Kingdom, as part of Brighton Fringe, created by performance collective Shambush! who attempted to set an unofficial world record for the most people dressed as Kate Bush in one place, with hundreds attending.

== 2016 ==
In 2016, The Most Wuthering Heights Day Ever event was proposed to be held in at least 16 places worldwide including the following:

- Australia: Adelaide, Perth, Northern Rivers, Sydney, Hobart, Melbourne - Shambush helped organise the event in Melbourne which was the largest
- Canada: Montreal
- Denmark: Copenhagen (Refshaleøen, 16 July)
- Germany: Berlin
- Israel: Tel Aviv
- New Zealand: Wellington, Christchurch
- Sweden: Uppsala
- The Netherlands: Amsterdam
- United Kingdom: London - hosted by Shambush
- United States: Atlanta, Somersworth

== 2017 ==
- Australia: Glebe Park, Canberra, Edinburgh Gardens in Fitzroy North, Melbourne, Cairns
- Ireland: Saint Anne's Park, Dublin
- The Netherlands: Rotterdam
- United States: Somersworth
- Sweden: Uppsala

== 2018 ==
- Australia: Bunbury (first time held), Cairns, Melbourne, Newcastle (held since 2016), Canberra, Townsville
- Belgium: Brussels (first time held)
- Denmark: Copenhagen (Balders Plads, Nørrebro 15 July)
- The Netherlands: Rotterdam
- United Kingdom: Folkestone
- Sweden: Uppsala
- United States: Austin (first time held), Somersworth

== 2019 ==
- Australia: Adelaide, Bega Valley, Blue Mountains, Brisbane, Bunbury, Cairns, Canberra, Gold Coast, Melbourne, Newcastle, Perth, Sydney
- Belgium: Ghent
- Canada: Hamilton, Ottawa
- Denmark: Copenhagen (Balders Plads, Nørrebro, 13 July)
- Finland: Oulu
- France: Laniscat, Paris
- Germany: Berlin
- Ireland: Dublin
- Israel: Tel Aviv (held on 18 May to coincide with Eurovision)
- Norway: Oslo
- Sweden: Uppsala, Värnamo
- United Kingdom: Folkestone, Gorleston-on-Sea
- United States: Atlanta, Austin, Greenfield, Somersworth

== 2020 ==
- Australia: Bunbury, Adelaide, Cairns, Canberra, Sydney
- United States: Somersworth

== 2021 ==
- Australia: Adelaide, Bega Valley, Brisbane, Bunbury, Cairns, Canberra, Frankston, Hobart, Melbourne, Perth
- Bulgaria: Sofia
- Denmark: Copenhagen (Hans Tavsens Park, Nørrebro, 17 July)
- Germany: Berlin, Dusseldorf, Munich, Langenhahn-Westerwaldkreis, Mainz
- Ireland: Dublin
- Italy: Monteveccia
- Mexico: Jalisco
- New Zealand: Dunedin, Waiheke Island
- Sweden: Nordingrå
- United Kingdom: Bristol & Beyond Lockdown Video Edition: https://www.youtube.com/watch?v=GT8iSo1ZLkE&list=RDGT8iSo1ZLkE&start_radio=1; Edinburgh, Gorleston-on-Sea
- United States: Atlanta, Austin, Greenfield, Reno, Somersworth

== 2022 ==
- Australia: Bunbury, Western Australia , Adelaide, Brisbane, Ballarat, Sydney, Canberra; Woodford, Blue Mountains
- Bulgaria: Sofia
- Denmark: Copenhagen (Korsgadehallen, Nørrebro, 30 July)
- Germany: Berlin, Borth, Cologne
- Ireland: Dublin
- New Zealand: Dunedin, Christchurch
- Sweden: Uppsala
- United Kingdom: Edinburgh
- United States: Atlanta, Greenfield, Reno, San Diego, Philadelphia

== 2023 ==
- Australia: Bunbury, Dunedin (15 July), Western Australia, Guildford, Western Australia, Adelaide, Brisbane, Sydney, Canberra
- Belgium: Ghent
- Bulgaria: Sofia
- Denmark: Copenhagen (Hans Tavsens Park, Nørrebro, 29 July)
- France: Neuvy-le-Roi
- Germany: Berlin, Borth, Cologne, Munich, Rostock
- Ireland: Dublin, Cahir Co. Tipperary
- New Zealand: Auckland, Raglan, Dunedin
- Sweden: Arjeplog, Jämtland/Offerdal, Östjansö, Uppsala, Husarö
- The Netherlands: Amsterdam
- United Kingdom: Bournemouth, Edinburgh, Folkestone, Furness, Lancaster, Preston
- United States: Atlanta, Austin, Baltimore, Boston, Concord, Greenfield, Nashville, Philadelphia, Reno, San Diego, Seattle

== 2024 ==
- Australia: Bunbury, Newcastle, Sydney, Daylesford, Wagga Wagga, Melbourne, Surges Bay, Dangar Island, Soul Song Choir at Somerset Dam, Queensland, Dangar Island, Mittagong, Adelaide
- Bulgaria: Sofia
- Denmark: Copenhagen (Hans Tavsens Park, Nørrebro, 27 July)
- France : Gizeux, Continvoir, Sète, Bon-Repos, Trévou-Tréguignec
- Germany: Berlin, Borth, Cologne, Munich,
- New Zealand: Dunedin (20 July), Raglan, Featherston
- Sweden: Jämtland/Offerdal, Husarö
- United Kingdom: Folkestone, Preston
- United States: Atlanta, Greenfield, Hillsborough, Reno, San Diego, Philadelphia
- Croatia: Karlovac

== 2025 ==
- Australia: Bunbury WA (26 July), Adelaide (27 July), Melbourne (20 July) 400 participants, Australian Film and Sound Archive Canberra (26 July), Brisbane (19 July), Ipswich Qld (27 July) Castlemaine (20 July), The Cape, Cape Paterson (19 July) Guildford Western Australia (19 July)
- Bulgaria: Sofia (19 July)
- Canada: Maynooth, Ontario (19 July)
- Denmark: Svendborg (Svendborg Library 21 May), Copenhagen (Hans Tavsens Park, Nørrebro, 26 July)
- Finland: Kemi (20 July)
- France: Saint-Hilaire-de-Briouze (30 July): Bon Repos sur Blavet, Bretagne,(20 July)
- Germany: Borth (9 July), Berlin (19 July), Cologne (20 July), Munich(13 July), Rostock (3 August)
- Ireland: Dublin (26 July, Fairview Park)
- Italy: Montevecchia (LC) (20 July)
- New Zealand: Auckland, Carterton, Dunedin (26 July), Featherston, Masterton, New Plymouth, Raglan
- Sweden: Uppsala (12 July), Jämtland/Offerdal/Lungret (26 July), Husarö (30 juli)
- United Kingdom: Cliftonville, Cromarty (Highlands: 27th July), Margate (27 July), Edinburgh (7 June), Folkestone (20 July), Hastings (31 August), Hay on Wye (20 July), St Neots, Cambs (20 July), Haworth (27 July), Kirkby Lonsdale (27 July), Preston (27 July), Stratford-upon-Avon (2 August), Winchelsea (20 July), Gorleston-on- sea (27 July), Kings Heath Birmingham (27 July)
- United States: Atlanta, GA; Greenfield, MA (26 July); Hillsborough, NC (27 July); Minneapolis, MN (19 July); Lindenhurst, NY, San Diego, CA (19 July); Los Alamos, NM (19 July); Philadelphia, PA (25 July)
- Scotland: Cromarty (Highlands: 27th July): https://www.youtube.com/watch?v=5DAhblzLw_0&list=RD5DAhblzLw_0&start_radio=1; Edinburgh @the Meadows Festival (7 June) 700 participants

== 2026 ==
- Australia: Adelaide (2 August), North Stradbroke Island (12 July), Brisbane (18 July), Melbourne (19 July), Bunbury WA (25 July), Sydney (25 July), Ipswich (26 July), Mooloo (26 July)
- Bulgaria: Sofia (25 July)
- Canada: Bridgewater, NS (11 July)
- Denmark: Copenhagen (Nørrebroparken, Nørrebro, 25 July)
- England: Haworth (26th July) South Downs, Sussex (25 July); St Neots, Cambridgeshire (12 July); Clevedon Marine Lake (26 July); Folkestone (26 July); Southend (26 July); Bedford (18 July); Gorleston (26 July); South Devon (Torquay) (2 August); Newbiggin-by-the-Sea (25 July); Tynemouth, Tyne & Wear (15 August); New Mills (26 July), Kings Heath Birmingham (26 July)
- Finland: Kemi (4 July), Raahe (25 July)
- France : Paris (26 July), Bon Repos sur Blavet, Bretagne (25 July)
- Germany: Cologne (28 June); Berlin (18 July)
- Lithuania : Kaunas (26 July)
- New Zealand: New Plymouth (12 July); Blackball (25 July); Christchurch (25 July); Dunedin (25 July); Nelson (25 July); Waiheke Island (25 July); Wānaka (26 July); Raglan/Whāingaroa (26 July); Wellington/Pо̄neke (26 July); Auckland (26 July); Hamilton/Kirikiriroa (9 August);
- Poland: Olsztyn (25 July)
- Scotland: Cromarty (Highlands: 12th July): https://www.youtube.com/watch?v=7pdRVzqN7iI&list=RD7pdRVzqN7iI&start_radio=1; Edinburgh (6 June)
- Sweden: Malmö (26 July); Husarö (23 july)
- USA: Baltimore (26 July); Greenfield (18 July); San Diego (18 July); Salt Lake City (1 August); Los Alamos, NM (1 August); Philadelphia (25 July)
- Wales: Swansea (26th July)

== 2027 ==
- Denmark: Copenhagen (24 July)
- Australia: Bunbury WA 10 year anniversary (31st July)
- Scotland: Cromarty (Highlands: TBC)
- England: Kings Heath Birmingham (25 July)
