= The Kick Inside =

Studio album by Kate Bush
- Released: 17 February 1978
- Recorded: June 1975, July–August 1977
- Studio: AIR (London)
- Genres: Art pop; progressive pop; baroque pop; art rock; progressive rock
- Length: 43:13
- Label: EMI
- Producers: Andrew Powell; David Gilmour (co-producer)

Kate Bush chronology
The Kick Inside (1978)	Lionheart (1978)

Singles from The Kick Inside
- 1. "Wuthering Heights" Released: 20 January 1978; 2. "Moving" Released: 20 April 1978 (Japan); 3. "The Man with the Child in His Eyes" Released: 26 May 1978; 4. "Them Heavy People" Released: September 1978 (Japan); 5. "Strange Phenomena" Released: 1 June 1979 (Brazil)

Alternative cover
- Artwork for the second (1978) and some subsequent US releases

The Kick Inside is the debut studio album by the English singer-songwriter Kate Bush. Released on 17 February 1978 by EMI Records, it includes her UK No. 1 hit, "Wuthering Heights". The album peaked at No. 3 on the UK Albums Chart and has been certified Platinum by the British Phonographic Industry (BPI). Several progressive rock musicians were involved in the album including Duncan Mackay, Ian Bairnson, David Paton, Andrew Powell, and Stuart Elliott of the Alan Parsons Project and David Gilmour of Pink Floyd.

== Background and recording ==
Having written songs since the age of 11, Kate Bush recorded demos with the assistance of her brothers, who were also musicians. A friend of theirs, Ricky Hopper, brought some of these tapes to various record companies in 1972, when Bush was 13. The tapes were passed over, but Hopper played them for his friend David Gilmour of Pink Floyd. Gilmour was immediately intrigued and went to meet with the Bush family and was impressed with Kate's talent for songwriting. He financed some better-quality demos and while Pink Floyd were recording their album Wish You Were Here (1975) at Abbey Road Studios, Gilmour played the tapes for record company executives. Two of the demos recorded in June 1975 were included on her debut album three years later: "The Man with the Child in His Eyes" and "The Saxophone Song".

EMI Records was impressed and agreed to sign her, offering her an advance of £3,000. At the time she was signed to the label, Bush had already accumulated roughly 100 songs. Bush did not begin the recording sessions for The Kick Inside immediately after she was signed to the label and instead started to study dance and movement. She received group dance instructions from Lindsay Kemp after reading about his services in a Time Out advert. Subsequently, she credited Kemp in the album liner notes and also wrote the song "Moving" as a tribute to him.

In 1976, Bush's contract was finally agreed upon by her family. In preparation for the recording, she embarked on playing with the KT Bush Band around various pubs. According to her brother Paddy, who also played with her on stage, these started out as very small affairs with little public interest but grew to larger audiences over the months. Finally, in July and August 1977, the rest of the songs were recorded at AIR Studios in London, helmed by producer Andrew Powell. Bush was keen to keep the line-up of the KT Bush Band for the recordings, but EMI insisted that she use properly experienced session musicians. Powell engaged Ian Bairnson, Duncan Mackay and Stuart Elliott among others, many of whom he had worked with before.

"Wuthering Heights" was not initially inspired by Emily Brontë's novel but by a 1967 television adaptation, although Bush read the novel later in order to (in her own words) "get the research right". Further influences can be found when she references Gurdjieff in "Them Heavy People", while the title song is inspired by the ballad of Lizie Wan.

== Release ==
The Kick Inside was released in the UK on 17 February 1978. Initially, the first single was to be "James and the Cold Gun", but Bush insisted on "Wuthering Heights". EMI relented and released the single in January 1978. The song later reached number one on the UK Singles Chart in March. It stayed at the top of the charts for four weeks, becoming one of the biggest selling songs of the year and was the first time a female singer-songwriter topped the charts with a self-penned song.

The album's second single, "The Man with the Child in His Eyes", reached number six in the UK. Three other singles were released around the world during the next two years: "Them Heavy People", "Moving" (which reached number one in Japan) and "Strange Phenomena". "The Man with the Child in His Eyes" also charted at No. 85 on the American Billboard Hot 100 and was Bush's only single to do so until 1985. Bush made an appearance on Saturday Night Live in December 1978. Despite this publicity, The Kick Inside failed to enter the Billboard 200.

The album peaked at number three on the UK Albums Chart and remained on the chart for much of the rest of the year. Eventually clocking up 71 weeks in the chart, it was certified platinum and remains one of Bush's biggest selling records.

== Critical reception ==
Professional ratings
Review scores
Source	Rating
AllMusic	4/5 stars
Drowned in Sound	8/10
Encyclopedia of Popular Music	4/5 stars
The Great Rock Discography	7/10
Mojo	5/5 stars
MusicHound Rock	2.5/5 stars
Pitchfork	8.4/10
Record Mirror	4/5 stars
The Rolling Stone Album Guide	3/5 stars
Spin Alternative Record Guide	8/10

Contemporary reviews were full of praise for the album. Billboard favoured the songs "Wuthering Heights" and "Them Heavy People" among others and said Bush wrote "evocative lyrics" and delivered them with "smooth and unrestrained vocals". Kris DiLorenzo of Crawdaddy said that "Bush's talent for soul-baring would be frightening were it not so ingenuous; she writes from a well of fantasy and feeling with a patina of experience, her concerns universal and womanly, not the usual wilted kitten yearning or last-rave bathos." Peter Reilly of Stereo Review praised Bush for going against the grain in women's music. He favoured the songs "The Man with the Child in His Eyes" and "Room for the Life" but cared less for "Wuthering Heights" and "James and the Cold Gun".

In later reviews, the album continued to receive universal praise. Pitchfork critic Laura Snapes said of the album, "It is ornate music made in austere times, but unlike the pop sybarites to follow in the next decade, flaunting their wealth while Britain crumbled, Bush spun hers not from material trappings but the infinitely renewable resources of intellect and instinct: Her joyous debut measures the fullness of a woman's life by what's in her head." Snapes spoke highly of every track, but had slight lyrical reservations for "Room for the Life". In a 2008 review for BBC Music, writer Chris Jones said, "Using mainly session musicians, The Kick Inside was the result of a record company actually allowing a young talent to blossom. Some of these songs were written when she was 13! Helmed by Gilmour's friend, Andrew Powell, it's a lush blend of piano grandiosity, vaguely uncomfortable reggae and intricate, intelligent, wonderful songs. All delivered in a voice that had no precedents." He says that the record company wanting to push "James and the Cold Gun" as the first single was a mistake as he labels it the album's "dullest track". AllMusic's Bruce Eder said that the album is "the sound of an impressionable and highly precocious teenager spreading her wings for the first time" and called it "a mightily impressive debut".

Not all reviews were positive. Sandy Robertson, from the now defunct music magazine Sounds, criticized the lyrics, especially on the song "Kite": "WHAT IS this supposed to be? Doom-laden, 'meaningful' songs (with some of the worst lyrics ever; sample: 'Beelzebub is aching in my belly-o/My feet are heavy and I'm rooted in my wellios') sung with the most irritatingly yelping voice since Robert Plant".

In an article for Stylus Magazine, Marcello Carlin wrote that The Kick Inside "probably kicked down more doors than the whole of the first and second waves of punk combined", writing of Bush's unusual subjects, stark voice ("seeming to glide and swoop at will, covering three-and-a-half octaves with minimal apparent effort") and piano chord progressions, saying "their delayed sustain, their unexpected trapdoor modulations, the very fingers which were playing them ... couldn’t be ascribed to any realistic precedent; for one very important thing, they sounded so unambiguously feminine."

== Comments from other musicians ==
Singer-songwriter Beth Orton named The Kick Inside one of her favourite albums. Fiona Apple said, "I used to sing and play a bunch of her songs from The Kick Inside at my piano when I was a kid: 'Feel It' and 'Moving' and 'The Kick Inside' and 'Wuthering Heights'." Sarah McLachlan said she "loved" the album and was "really attracted to her voice and songs".

== Track listing ==
All tracks are written by Kate Bush.

Side one
No.	Title	Length
1.	"Moving"	3:01
2.	"The Saxophone Song"	3:51
3.	"Strange Phenomena"	2:57
4.	"Kite"	2:56
5.	"The Man with the Child in His Eyes"	2:39
6.	"Wuthering Heights"	4:28

Side two
No.	Title	Length
7.	"James and the Cold Gun"	3:34
8.	"Feel It"	3:02
9.	"Oh to Be in Love"	3:18
10.	"L'Amour Looks Something Like You"	2:27
11.	"Them Heavy People"	3:04
12.	"Room for the Life"	4:03
13.	"The Kick Inside"	3:30
Total length:		43:13

== Personnel ==
Credits are adapted from The Kick Inside liner notes.

Musicians

- Kate Bush – lead and backing vocals; piano
- Andrew Powell – arrangements; keyboards (2); piano; Fender Rhodes piano (3); bass guitar; celeste (6); synthesizer (9); beer bottles (12)
- Duncan Mackay – piano; Fender Rhodes (1, 10); synthesizer (3); Hammond organ (4, 6, 7); clavinet (4)
- Ian Bairnson – electric guitar; acoustic guitar (except on 2); backing vocals (9); beer bottles (12)
- David Paton – bass guitar (1, 3, 4, 7, 9–12); acoustic guitar (6, 9); backing vocals (9)
- Stuart Elliott – drums (exc. 2, 5, 13); percussion (9, 12)
- Alan Skidmore – tenor saxophone (2)
- Paul Keogh – electric guitar; acoustic guitar (2)
- Alan Parker – acoustic guitar (2)
- Bruce Lynch – bass guitar (2)
- Barry de Souza – drums (2)
- Morris Pert – percussion (3, 4, 6); boobam (12)
- Paddy Bush – mandolin (9); backing vocals (11)
- David Katz – orchestral contractor (for an uncredited orchestra on all tracks exc. 4, 5, 7, 8, 12)

Production

- Andrew Powell – producer
- David Gilmour – executive producer (2, 5)
- Jon Kelly – recording engineer
- Jon Walls – assistant engineer
- Wally Traugott – mastering

== Charts ==
=== Weekly charts ===
Initial chart performance for The Kick Inside
Chart (1978–80)	Peak position
Australian Albums (Kent Music Report)	3
Belgian Albums (Humo)	2
Canada Top Albums/CDs (RPM)	95
Danish Albums (Denmarks Radio)	5
Dutch Albums (Album Top 100)	1
Finnish Albums (Suomen virallinen lista)	2
French Albums (IFOP)	3
German Albums (Offizielle Top 100)	21
Italian Albums (Musica e Dischi)	12
Japanese Albums (Oricon)	37
New Zealand Albums (RMNZ)	2
Norwegian Albums (VG-lista)	4
Portuguese Albums (Musica & Som)	1
Swedish Albums (Sverigetopplistan)	8
UK Albums (Official Charts)	3

2005 chart performance for The Kick Inside
Chart (2005)	Position
Japanese Albums (Oricon)	204

2014 chart performance for The Kick Inside
Chart (2014)	Position
UK Albums (Official Charts)	24

2022 chart performance for The Kick Inside
Chart (2022)	Position
UK Album Downloads (Official Charts)	57

2024 chart performance for The Kick Inside
Chart (2024)	Position
UK Albums Sales	49
UK Independent Albums	19
UK Vinyl Albums	19

=== Year-end charts ===
1978 year-end chart performance for The Kick Inside
Chart (1978)	Position
Australian Albums (Kent Music Report)	10
Dutch Albums (Album Top 100)	7
French Albums (SNEP)	42
New Zealand Albums (RMNZ)	10
Portuguese Albums (Musica & Som)	2
UK Albums (OCC)	9

1979 year-end chart performance for The Kick Inside
Chart (1979)	Position
UK Albums (OCC)	71

== Certifications and sales ==
Certifications and sales for The Kick Inside
Region	Certification	Certified units/sales
Australia (ARIA)	Platinum	50,000^{^}
Canada (Music Canada)	Platinum	100,000^{^}
Germany	—	150,000
Japan	—	25,000
Netherlands (NVPI)	Platinum	100,000^{^}
New Zealand (RMNZ)	Platinum	15,000^{^}
United Kingdom (BPI)	Platinum	1,000,000
United States	—	74,000
^{^} Shipments figures based on certification alone.

== See also ==
- Kate Bush discography
- List of awards and nominations received by Kate Bush
