= 66° Pohjoista Leveyttä =

Studio album by Valen Hsu
- Released: 28 December 2007
- Genre: Mandopop
- Label: Seed Music (TW)

Valen Hsu chronology
Rue Blossom (2002)	66° Pohjoista Leveyttä (2007)	My Love Journey 1km (2009)

66° Pohjoista Leveyttä is the 13th album by Mandopop singer Valen Hsu. It was released on 28 December 2007.

== Track listing ==
Disc one

1. 看完煙火再回去 (Let's go back after watching the fireworks)
2. 男人女人 (Men and Woman)
3. 手寫愛 (Handwritten love)
4. 我絕對不說我愛你 (I would never say I love you)
5. 愛人動物 (Animal lover)
6. 樂天市場 (Lotte market)
7. 飛行時光 (Flight time)
8. 愛情．進站 (Love.stop)
9. 見過永遠 (Ever seen)
10. 北緯六十六度 (66° Pohjoista Leveyttä)

Bonus music video disc

1. 北緯六十六度 (66° Pohjoista Leveyttä)
2. 看完煙火再回去 (Let's go back after watching the fireworks)
3. 手寫愛 (Handwritten love)
4. 我絕對不說我愛你 (I would never say I love you)
5. 男人女人 (Men and Woman)
