= Wuthering Heights (song) =

1978 single by Kate Bush

- Standard European artwork of the single cover

Single by Kate Bush

from the album The Kick Inside
- B-side: "Kite"
- Written: 5 March 1977
- Released: 20 January 1978
- Recorded: 1977
- Studio: AIR (London)
- Genre: Art pop; baroque pop; art rock; progressive rock
- Length: 4:29
- Label: EMI
- Songwriter: Kate Bush
- Producer: Andrew Powell

Kate Bush singles chronology
"Wuthering Heights" (1978)	"Moving" (1978)

Music video
- "Wuthering Heights" on YouTube

Audio sample
- "Wuthering Heights" (1977): file; help

"Wuthering Heights" is the debut single by the English singer-songwriter Kate Bush, released on 20 January 1978 through EMI Records. It was released as the lead single from Bush's debut album, The Kick Inside (1978). With lyrics inspired by the 1847 novel Wuthering Heights by Emily Brontë, Bush wrote the song in a single evening at the age of 18.

"Wuthering Heights" spent 14 weeks in the UK singles chart, including four weeks at number one in March 1978. This made Bush the first female artist to achieve a number-one single with an entirely self-written song. It also reached the top of the charts in Australia, Ireland, Italy, New Zealand, and Portugal.

In 2016, Pitchfork named "Wuthering Heights" the fifth-greatest song of the 1970s. In 2020, The Guardian ranked it as the 14th-best UK number-one single. It is certified platinum in the UK for sales and streams of more than 600,000 units. A remix featuring rerecorded vocals was included on Bush's first compilation album, The Whole Story (1986), and included as the B-side to her 1986 single "Experiment IV".

== Composition ==
Bush wrote "Wuthering Heights" aged 18, in a few hours late at night on 5 March 1977. She was inspired after catching the final minutes of the 1967 BBC adaptation of the 1847 novel Wuthering Heights when she was a child. She subsequently read the novel and discovered that she shared her birthday with its author, Emily Brontë.

"Wuthering Heights" is sung from the perspective of the Wuthering Heights character Catherine Earnshaw, a ghost pleading at Heathcliff's window to be allowed in. It quotes Catherine's dialogue, including the lyrics "I'm so cold", "let me in", and "bad dreams in the night". The critic Simon Reynolds described it as "Gothic romance distilled into four-and-a-half minutes of gaseous rhapsody". The music and lyrics establish a duality between the real world and the afterlife. The real world is associated with the past tense and a tonic of A major, whereas Cathy's afterlife is associated with the present tense and a tonic of D♭ major. The song also uses unusual harmonic progressions and irregular phrase lengths.

Bush recorded her vocal in a single take. Her performance uses manipulations in soft palate to produce changes in vocal timbre, a technique popular among Indian playback singers and in Peking opera. The guitar solo is played by Ian Bairnson, who said that he initially disliked the tone for many years for "purely guitarist reasons". Bairnson played the solo with a broken arm. The engineer, Jon Kelly, said he regretted not placing the solo louder in the mix. The production team, with Bush, began mixing at midnight and stayed until "five or six in the morning".

== Release ==
Bush's record company, EMI, originally chose another track, "James and the Cold Gun", as the lead single, but Bush was determined to use "Wuthering Heights" instead. "Wuthering Heights" was initially scheduled for a November release, but EMI pushed the release date back over fears that it would "get caught up in the Christmas rush". The song nonetheless began to receive airplay in November 1977 after a few copies were inadvertently distributed to the Capital radio network.

The single cover artwork mirrored that used for the album cover; both featured a photograph of Bush "clinging to a large painted dragon kite, gliding across a vast, all-seeing eye", taken by Jay Myrdal.

"Wuthering Heights" entered the charts in the week ending 11 February 1978 at No. 42. The following week it rose to No. 27, and Bush made her first appearance on Top of the Pops. The song was added to BBC Radio 1's playlist the following week and became one of the most-played records on radio. In 1986, the first pressings of her first compilation album The Whole Story erroneously stated the release date for this single as 4 November 1977. By March 1979, "Wuthering Heights" had sold over one million copies internationally.

== Music videos ==
=== Official video ===
Two music videos with similar choreography were created to accompany "Wuthering Heights". This version was directed by Keef, who went on to do many of her future videos. Bush created the choreography and dance moves to suggest her character is a ghost (as in this scene in the novel), without explicitly stating as much. Bush's video was heavily inspired by 1967 BBC version of Wuthering Heights. Labelled as "Kate Bush – Wuthering Heights – Official Music Video – Version 1" on her YouTube channel (despite being filmed second) Bush is seen in a white dress with deep, black eyeliner and mist surrounding her against a dark background.

In the BBC's 1967 adaptation of Wuthering Heights at the two and a half hour mark, there is a scene where Catherine Earnshaw is outside the window with wide eyes and snow surrounding her in complete darkness with a white hue around her face. The words that Catherine speaks are "I've come home" which matches Kate Bush's lyrics "It's me, I'm Cathy, I've come home. I'm so cold. Let me in-a-your-window." Critics have described this video as a milestone in the history of music videos before the MTV era, with Pitchfork putting it on number three on the list of greatest music videos from the 70s.

The official music video also offer a different perspective when it comes to the novel Wuthering Heights by Emily Brontë. Nelly Dean narrates the entire story which leads to a skewed version of Heathcliff and Cathy's relationship. She is directly involved in many of the events, expressing the depths of certain situations, but continues to be an unreliable narrator due to her "insensitivity" and "emotional inadequacy" as she follows their romance. Kate Bush's song and music videos turn these important scenes into a first person point of view with lines such as “You had a temper, like my jealousy / too hot too greedy.” Because of this, Kate Bush's music videos are used by professors as a way to show the haunting themes in the novel Wuthering Heights.

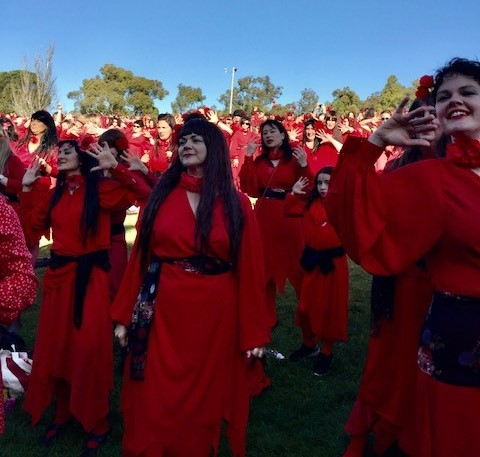
Bush fans at the Most Wuthering Heights Day Ever in Melbourne, Australia, 2016

=== Outdoor Version ===
This video was filmed before the projected release date of November 1977 and was directed by Nicholas Abson. In the outside version, (labelled "Kate Bush – Wuthering Heights – Official Music Video – Version 2" on her YouTube channel) Bush is shown dancing—'out in the wily, windy moors'—in a grassy area located on Salisbury Plain (inspired by the novel's moors) with Scots pine trees in the background, on an overcast day, while wearing a flowy red dress. The exact location is called "Baden's Clump" near Sidbury Hill, close to the town of Tidworth in Wiltshire. This video was filmed on the morning of 26 October 1977. The red dress has been referenced numerous times in popular culture.

This music video has been influential in sparking events such as "The Most Wuthering Heights Day Ever". To imitate Kate Bush, the participants called "Cathys" would wear a red dress with black accessories and red lipstick as the signature look. Though the music video was filmed in the grassy area of Salisbury Plain, this event has made its way to many other places and countries such as the United States. One of the first events in the US was located in James Madison Park in Wisconsin in 2016.

== Critical reception ==
Cash Box wrote favourably of "Wuthering Heights", saying the single "showcases Bush's decidedly unusual high-end end voice." Record World, although highlighting Bush's unusual voice, noted that with "continued listening, [...] the lovely hook should endear it to pop and adult audiences alike."

== Chart performance ==
"It was suddenly non-stop working. I put up with sixteen months of that and then I said: look, I've just got to stop or I'm not going to be able to write any songs any more."

— Bush reflecting on "Wuthering Heights" instant success.

After being delayed for two months, "Wuthering Heights" was officially released in early 1978 and entered the top forty in the official singles chart in the United Kingdom at number twenty-seven on 18 February. It rose to number one three weeks later dethroning ABBA's "Take a Chance on Me" from the top spot. Bush became the first female artist to have an entirely self-written number one in the UK. The single release unwittingly pitted Bush against another female vocalist also charting with her first UK hit: Debbie Harry with her band Blondie and their single "Denis", which stalled at number two. "Wuthering Heights" remained at number one for a month until it was replaced at the top by Brian and Michael's celebration of the then-recently deceased artist L. S. Lowry, "Matchstalk Men and Matchstalk Cats and Dogs". Bush's debut single finished the year as the tenth highest-selling and was certified gold by the British Phonographic Industry, denoting sales of more than half a million.

"Wuthering Heights" also hit number one in Ireland, in Italy, in New Zealand, where it spent five weeks at number one and achieved platinum status, and in Australia, where it stayed at the top of the charts for three consecutive weeks and achieved gold status. It proved to be one of the biggest hits of 1978 in Denmark. It reached the top ten in Spain, Belgium, the Netherlands, Finland, France, Norway, Sweden, and Switzerland, as well as the top twenty in Austria and West Germany. Bush had performed the song on the first episode of the West German music talk show Bio's Bahnhof on 9 February 1978.

Following the live performance of the song by Laura Bunting on The Voice in Australia, "Wuthering Heights" re-entered the country's top 40 in 2012, 34 years after its original release in 1978.

After the release of feature film Wuthering Heights in February 2026, Bush's single peaked at number 49 on the UK Singles Downloads Chart.

== Legacy ==
Written when Bush was 18 years old, this eerie gothic tale of lost love and longing cemented her individuality from the very beginning. She appeared on Top of the Pops with it five times in 1978, cementing her public image as an ethereal spirit, embodying the essence of Cathy through a combination of wide eyes, floaty fabrics and wild choreography, still fondly mimicked and parodied today.

— Rebecca Nicholson in The Guardian on the impact of the song.

A remixed version, featuring rerecorded vocals, was included on the 1986 greatest hits album The Whole Story. This version also appeared as the B-side to her 1986 hit "Experiment IV".

In 2018, as part of the Bradford Literature Festival, it was announced that Bush had been invited to write an epitaph to Emily Brontë, which would be inscribed on one of four stones erected near the Brontë's home in Haworth, West Yorkshire. Commenting on the unveiling of her poem, entitled Emily, Bush said "to be asked to write a piece for Emily's stone is an honour and, in a way, a chance to say thank you to her".

A flash mob event known as The Most Wuthering Heights Day Ever was officially created in 2016 and is held annually. Fans gather in locations around the world to recreate the "red dress" video. Upon seeing a video clip of the event, Bush said that she found it "very touching and sweet".

Pat Benatar recorded a cover version of this song for her 1980 album Crimes of Passion. OMD frontman Andy McCluskey named "Wuthering Heights" as the first song he fell in love with.

The song has been interpreted by comedians Steve Coogan and Noel Fielding, on two occasions, as part of the BBC fundraising telethon Comic Relief. Coogan sang the song in the 1999 show as part of a medley of other Bush material in character as Alan Partridge. Fielding performed to the song in the 2011 series of Let's Dance for Comic Relief, placing in the final of the competition.

== Personnel ==
Credits sourced from Sound on Sound magazine

- Kate Bush – lead vocals, piano
- Andrew Powell – arrangements, celesta
- Duncan Mackay – Hammond organ
- David Paton – 12-string acoustic guitars, bass guitar
- Ian Bairnson – electric and acoustic guitars
- Stuart Elliott – drums
- Morris Pert – crotales
- David Katz – orchestral contractor

== Charts ==
=== Weekly charts ===
Weekly chart performance for "Wuthering Heights"
Chart (1978)	Peak position
Australia (Kent Music Report)	1
Austria (Ö3 Austria Top 40)	17
Belgium (Ultratop 50 Flanders)	6
Brazil (Cash Box)	1
Denmark (Tracklisten)	4
Finland (Suomen virallinen lista)	4
France (SNEP)	14
Ireland (IRMA)	1
Italy (Musica e dischi)	1
Netherlands (Dutch Top 40)	4
Netherlands (Single Top 100)	3
New Zealand (Recorded Music NZ)	1
Norway (VG-lista)	7
Portugal (Musica & Som)	1
South Africa (Springbok Radio)	3
Spain (Promusicae)	10
Sweden (Sverigetopplistan)	6
Switzerland (Schweizer Hitparade)	8
UK Singles (Official Charts)	1
US Bubbling Under Hot 100 (Billboard)	8
US Record World Singles	116
West Germany (Der Musikmarkt)	11

Chart (2012)	Peak position
Australia (ARIA)	39

Chart (2014)	Peak position
UK Singles (Official Charts)	57

Chart (2022)	Peak position
UK Singles Downloads (Official Charts)	34

Chart (2026)	Peak position
UK Singles Chart	40

=== Year-end charts ===
Chart (1978)	Position
Australia (Kent Music Report)	11
Belgium (Ultratop)	46
Netherlands (Single Top 100)	18
New Zealand (Recorded Music NZ)	5
Portugal (Musica & Som)	1
UK Singles (OCC)	10
West Germany (Official German Charts)	45

== Certifications and sales ==
Region	Certification	Certified units/sales
Australia (ARIA)	Gold	50,000^{^}
Brazil (Pro-Música Brasil)	Gold	150,000
Denmark (IFPI Danmark)	Gold	45,000^{‡}
France	—	200,000
Germany	—	100,000
Italy	—	300,000
Netherlands (NVPI)	Gold	40,000
New Zealand (RMNZ)	Platinum	20,000^{*}
New Zealand (RMNZ) reissue	Platinum	30,000^{‡}
United Kingdom (BPI) Physical	Gold	500,000^{^}
United Kingdom (BPI) Digital	Platinum	600,000^{‡}
Summaries
Worldwide 1978 sales	—	1,000,000
^{*} Sales figures based on certification alone.^{^} Shipments figures based on certification alone.^{‡} Sales+streaming figures based on certification alone.

== See also ==
- List of number-one singles in Australia during the 1970s
