= My Love Journey 1km =

Studio album by Valen Hsu
- Released: July 15, 2009
- Genre: Mandopop
- Label: Seed Music (TW)

Valen Hsu chronology
| 66° Pohjoista Leveyttä (2007) | My Love Journey 1km (2009) | When The Night Falls... Do You Hear (Me)? (2011) |

My Love Journey 1km was the 14th album by Mandopop singer Valen Hsu that was released on 15 July 2009.

== Track listing ==
1. 一有愛就走吧 (Let's go when there's love)
2. 頂多是偶爾 (At most once in a while)
3. 親愛的是你把我寵壞 (Dear, you are the one who spoil me)
4. 一公里 (1km)
5. 慢熱 (Slow)
6. 和你一起 (Together with you)
7. 另一半 (The other half)
8. 楓糖早餐 (Maple syrup breakfast)
9. 心得 (Gained knowledge)
10. 愛的虛線 (The dotted line of Love)
