= Valen Hsu =

- 許茹芸
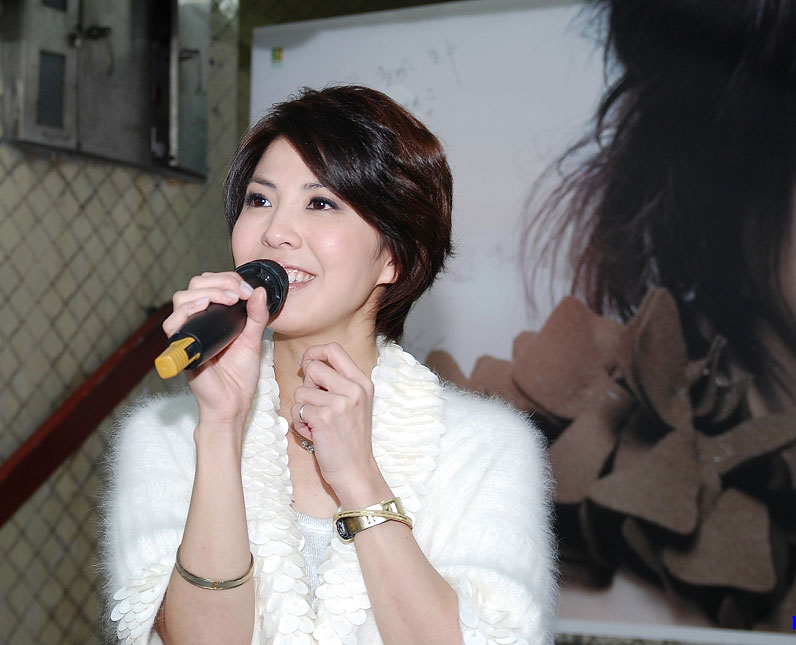
- Hsu performing at National Taiwan Normal University in 2007, Taipei, Taiwan.
- Born: Hsu Hung-hsiu (許宏琇); September 20, 1974 (age 51); Taipei, Taiwan
- Occupations: Singer; composer; songwriter; actress
- Years active: 1994–present
- Spouse: Choi Jae-sung (m. 2013)

Chinese name
- Traditional Chinese: 許茹芸
- Simplified Chinese: 许茹芸
Transcriptions
Standard Mandarin
- Hanyu Pinyin: Xǔ Rúyún
- Musical career
- Also known as: Hsu Ru-yun, 琇琇
- Genres: Mandopop, Cantopop
- Instruments: Piano, keyboard
- Labels: What's Music (1995–2000); EMI Music Taiwan (2001–2003); Silver Fish Productions (2004–2006); Seed Music (2007–2009); Valen Voice Production (2010–2017); Sony Music Taiwan (2017–present)
- Website: valenvoice.com

Hsu Ru-yun (Chinese: 許茹芸; born Hsu Hung-hsiu; September 20, 1974), better known as Valen Hsu, is a Taiwanese pop singer-songwriter, author and occasional actress. Since the mid-1990s Hsu has been one of the most popular female singers in the Mandopop scene, and is best known for her love ballads.

== Biography ==
A classically trained pianist, she started playing the piano when she was 4. While she was attending high school in 1993, she was discovered while performing in a restaurant in Taipei, where many famous pop artists began their careers. She was offered a contract with Taiwan's What's Music Record label and began work on her first commercial album, all before the age of 19.

== Career ==
Valen Hsu is known for her vocals, which are wispy yet strong and crystal-clear. Her singing voice and technique have been compared to China's Faye Wong. In 1998, the Japanese magazine publication Asia Pop voted her as the best female pop vocalist in Asia. She has been known to deliver CD-quality live performances. Occasionally, she will play the piano while singing live at her concerts.

=== Career peak (1995–2000) ===
Valen Hsu has recorded 14 studio albums over the span of eight years, as well as four "Best Of" compilations. Her first album, Tau Hao, was completed in 1994 and received critical acclaim from the Asian music industry. However, record sales did not exceed expectations, only selling a little over 50,000 copies. Her next studio album was what significantly changed her career. Lei Hai, or Tear Sea as translated, sold more than 300,000 copies in Taiwan. And her third album, If the Cloud Knows, sold over 2.2 million copies alone in Taiwan. Her fourth album, Ri Guang Ji Chang (Sunlight Airport) was completed in 1998 and sold 800,000 copies in Taiwan, but over 3 million copies in Asia, permanently placing her in the company of Asian divas such as Faye Wong and Sandy Lam and becoming an integral part of a new Mando-Pop era including Coco Lee and A-Mei.

In 1999, after the sale of What's Music to Universal Records (Taiwan), she recorded a duet with Enrique Iglesias entitled You’re My No. 1, released on Enrique's Asian version of his Enrique album.

=== Career Stabilization (2001–2004) ===
She ended her contract with What's Music in 2001 and signed on with EMI Taiwan. The first album with her new record label was titled I Just Want to Tell You; it was produced by Yosinori Kameda, a famous Japanese music producer. In 2001, she decided to broaden her professional career by acting in her first TV drama with F4, Taiwan's boy-band equivalent to 'N Sync. She further broadened her acting career in 2003 by performing on stage with Zuni Icosahedron, an independent cultural collective concentrating on alternative theater and multi-media performances. In 2004, she decided to take a hiatus from the music industry to pursue other interests, including learning English in New York City.

=== Back from hiatus (2007–2010) ===
Her 13th studio album entitled 66° Pohjoista Leveyttä was released on December 21, 2007. She traveled to Finland's Arctic Circle to film her music videos for this new album. Filming took place mainly in two cities: Helsinki and Rovaniemi. The first single is called "Fireworks". She recorded a duet with Amguulan, a very talented singer from Inner Mongolia, "Man and Woman" became one of the most popular song throughout 2008.

After a 19 months hiatus, Valen released her latest album My Love Journey 1 km. She invited her friend Josh to co-produced this album with her. Her first single is called 'Let's go when love arrives', 2nd song is a soft rock 'With You'.

=== Valen voice production, world tour (2010–present) ===
In 2009, Valen ended her contract with Seed Music and decided to travel to Cuba. After returning from Cuba, she released a series of travelogues and photography books. In 2010, Valen decide to re-ignite her music career by setting up her own music studio, Valen Voice Production. Her new album When The Night Falls... Do You Hear (Me)? was released on November 10, 2011.

In October 2011, Valen announced the start of her concert in Shanghai Grand Stage, which will span from Taiwan, other cities in mainland China and South-east Asia.

In August 2015, Valen entered The Chinese version of King of Mask Singer (蒙面歌王), using the mask of Iron Fan Ultraman to conceal her identity. She was crowned the Mask King of the fourth episode.

== Other works ==
=== Acting ===
In 2006, she filmed a full-length movie with Hong Kong director Patrick Tam entitled Fu Zi, or After This Our Exile as translated. She stars alongside Hong Kong actors Aaron Kwok and Charlie Yeung. The film was released in 2006 and subsequently won several Golden Horse Awards (Asia's equivalent to the Academy Awards) in the same year, including Best Picture and Best Actor.

=== Writing ===
In addition to composing and writing some of her songs, she has also published two books, one of them a compilation of short poems and the other a beauty book entitled Beauty Sense, which were published in 2003 and 2006, respectively.

In 2010, she published a travelogue, Vis-à-Vis, which comprises short poems and photos shot in Cuba. A digital version on iPad was released in 2011.

== Charity work ==
In 1999, she traveled to Rwanda, Africa with the World Health Organization and other Asian celebrities to perform charity work, filming a commercial and raising funds for donation through sales of an E.P. entitled Wo Niu (which means "Snail"), written by Jay Chou, one of Asia's male mega pop stars.

=== Hope Education Foundation ===
In 2006, Valen and her friends, Charlie Yeung, Gigi Leung and Angelica Lee formed "Hope Education Foundation", which is a non-profit organization to help children in need.

== Discography ==
=== Studio albums ===
English	Chinese	Release date
Ingratiate	討好	June 1995
Tear Sea	淚海	March 1996
The Cloud Knows?	如果雲知道	September 1996
Place de Sun Airport	日光機場	June 1997
Still Loving You	我依然愛你	June 1998
Best Love	你是最ㄞˋ(愛)	December 1998
Victory	真愛無敵	August 1999
I’m This Happy (Cantonese)	我就是這麼快樂	November 1999
What's A Nice Weather	難得好天氣	May 2000
Flower Blossom	花咲	December 2000
Just Want to Tell You	只說給你聽	September 2001
Blossom	芸開了	November 2002
Valen Hsu's Best Movie Theme Songs – Cloud Stay	雲且留住 - 許茹芸的愛情電影主題曲	June 2003
66° Pohjoista Leveyttä	北緯六十六度	December 2007
My Love Journey 1 km	愛·旅行·一公里	July 2009
When The Night Falls... Do You Hear (Me)?	你聽見了我嗎 - 許茹芸的微醺音樂	November 2011
Miracle	奇蹟	October 2014
Freyja	綻放的綻放的綻放	September 2018

=== Compilations ===
English/Pinyin title	Chinese (Traditional)	Release date
Best 13 Love Song Collection	茹此精彩十三首新歌加精選 香港版	September 1997
Liu Jin Shi Zai "Best Of...	流金十載 － 許茹芸全記錄	June 2001
Lonely Diary 1995 – 2001	單身日記 － 1995 – 2001	June 2001
I Love The Nights Of Autumn (New + Best Selection)	我愛夜	December 2003
Valen Hsu Classical Mandarin Songs	許茹芸 － 國語真經典	February 2005
Forever Friends Collection	永遠的朋友典藏系列	February 2007
Greatest Hits	好歌茹芸	May 2011

=== Instrumental ===
English/Pinyin title	Chinese (Traditional)	Release date
Piano Diary	鋼琴記事簿	September 1999

=== EP/Singles ===
English/Pinyin title	Chinese (Traditional)	Release date
Neighbor (Fan Club single — not for sale)	鄰居	November 1996
Snail	蝸牛	July 1999
Pleasant to Hear	好聽	April 2007
Thank You for Coming	等得到	April 2019

== Musical theatre performances ==
- 2003 – Good Wind Like Water (好風如水)(Zuni Icosahedron)
- 2005 – Fragments d’un Discours Amoureux (戀人絮語) (Yi Hua Lin Productions)
- 2010 – Turn Left, Turn Right (幾米 / 向左走向右走) (Based on the book A Chance of Sunshine by Jimmy Liao)

== Film and television ==
- 2002 – Come to My Place (來我家吧) – Director : Cheng Ze Niou (Cast : Valen Hsu, F4)
- 2005 – After This Our Exile (父子) – Director : Patrick Tam （Cast : Aaron Kwok, Charlie Yeung, Valen Hsu）

== Books ==
- 2003 – The cost of happiness at this point in time (此時快樂的代價), A collection of short poems
- 2006 – Beauty Sense (五感美人), A book on beauty and wellness tips
- 2008 – Fragile (小心輕放), 2nd book of collection of short poems
- 2009 – I Want to be Your Friend (我想要和你做朋友), A book for Hope Foundation
- 2010 – Vis-à-Vis (對照), Collections of short poems and photos shot in Cuba
- 2011 – Vis-à-Vis (對照) iPad version, Collections of short poems and photos shot in Cuba

== Endorsements and charities ==
- 1996 – Esprit Clothing Spokesperson
- 1998 – AB Call Pager Service
- 1998 – ICRT Charity Concert
- 1999 – Head & Shoulders Shampoo Commercial – Part 1 (Taiwan, Singapore & Hong Kong) (E.P.：All Your Heart）
- 1999 – WHO Charity Run — Rwanda（E.P. : Gua Niou）
- 1999 – Head & Shoulders Shampoo Commercial – Part 2 (Taiwan, Singapore & Hong Kong) (E.P. : I’m This Happy）
- 1999 – Cable & Wireless (Hong Kong Telecom)
- 2002 – Tai Ping Soda Crackers Commercial [China & Hong Kong]
- 2002 – O Smile Biscuits Commercial [Taiwan]
- 2003 – Mei Bei Jia Shampoo Commercial [China]
- 2006 – Chantecaille Spokesperson
- 2006 – Rice Beauty Products Commercial & Spokesperson
