= Kate Bush =

English singer-songwriter (born 1958)

Kate Bush CBE
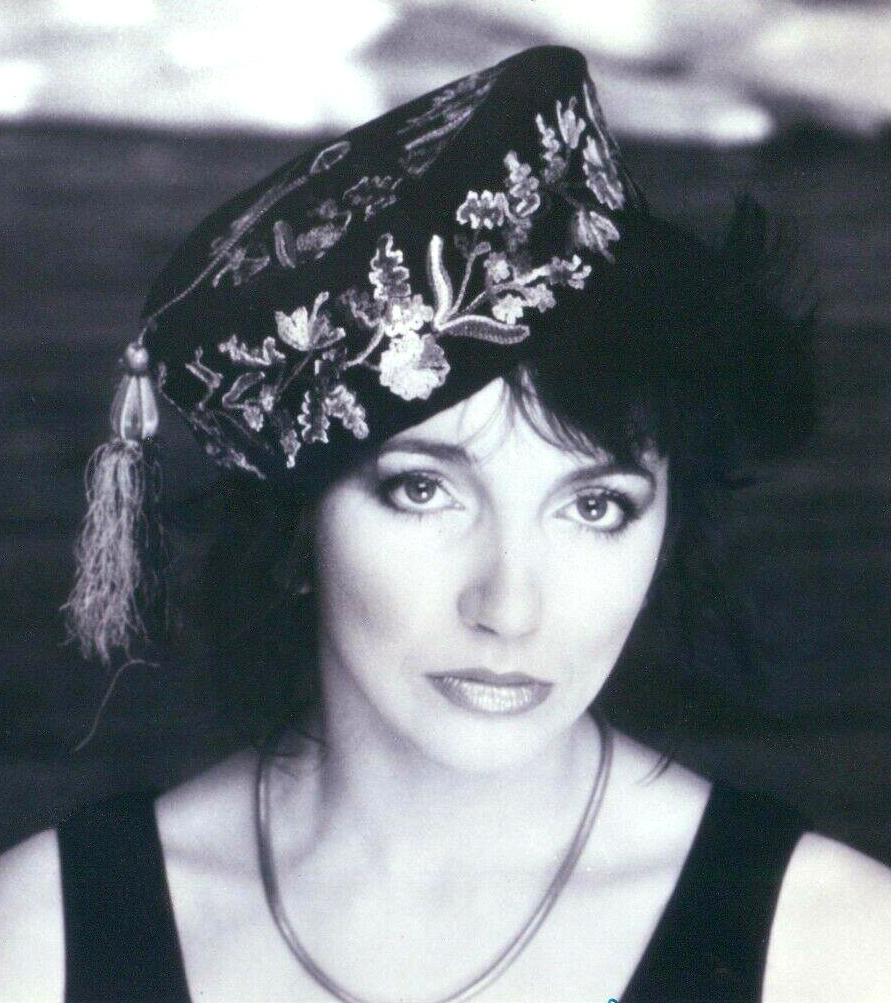
- Bush in 1985
- Born: Catherine Bush; 30 July 1958 (age 68); Bexleyheath, Kent, England
- Occupations: Singer; songwriter; musician; dancer; record producer
- Years active: 1978–present
- Spouse: Danny McIntosh (m. 1992)
- Children: 1
- Awards: Full list
- Musical career
- Genres: Art pop; progressive pop; baroque pop; art rock
- Instruments: Vocals; piano; keyboards
- Works: Kate Bush discography
- Labels: Harvest; EMI; Fish People; Columbia; Anti; Concord; Parlophone; The state51 Conspiracy
- Website: katebush.com

Catherine Bush (born 30 July 1958) is an English singer, songwriter, musician, dancer and record producer. She is noted for her eclectic style, unconventional lyrics and innovative dance performances. Her sound and choreography have influenced a range of artists.

Bush began writing songs when she was 11. She was signed to EMI Records after David Gilmour of Pink Floyd helped finance a demo tape. In 1978, at the age of 19, she topped the UK singles chart for four weeks with her debut single "Wuthering Heights", becoming the first female artist to achieve a UK number one with a fully self-written song. Her debut studio album, The Kick Inside (1978), reached number three on the UK Albums Chart. Bush was the first British solo female artist to top the UK Albums Chart and the first female artist to enter it at number one. All nine of her studio albums have reached the UK top 10, including the number-one albums Never for Ever (1980) and Hounds of Love (1985), and the greatest-hits compilation The Whole Story (1986). Since The Dreaming (1982), she has produced all of her studio albums. She took a hiatus between her seventh and eighth albums, The Red Shoes (1993) and Aerial (2005). Her most recent albums, Director's Cut and 50 Words for Snow, were both released in 2011.

Bush has released 25 UK top 40 singles, including the top-10 hits "The Man with the Child in His Eyes" (1978), "Babooshka" (1980), "Running Up That Hill" (1985), "Don't Give Up" (a 1986 duet with Peter Gabriel) and "King of the Mountain" (2005). Her 2014 concert residency Before the Dawn— her first shows since the Tour of Life in 1979 — received acclaim. In 2022, after it appeared in the Netflix series Stranger Things, "Running Up That Hill" became Bush's second UK number-one single and her highest entry on the US Billboard Hot 100, at number three, and topped several international charts. Hounds of Love topped two Billboard charts and reached number 12 on the Billboard 200.

Bush's accolades and honours include 14 Brit Award nominations and a win for British Female Solo Artist in 1987, as well as seven nominations for Grammy Awards. In 2002, she received the Ivor Novello Award for Outstanding Contribution to British Music. She was appointed a Commander of the Order of the British Empire (CBE) in the 2013 New Year Honours for services to music. She was awarded an Ivor Novello fellowship in 2020, and inducted into the Rock and Roll Hall of Fame in 2023.

== Life and career ==
=== 1958–1972: Early life ===
Bush was born on 30 July 1958 at a maternity hospital in Bexleyheath, Kent, to an English doctor, general practitioner Robert Bush (1920–2008), and Hannah Patricia (née Daly) (1918–1992), an Irish staff nurse, daughter of a farmer in County Waterford. She grew up with her elder brothers, John and Paddy, in an over 350-year-old former farmhouse at East Wickham near Welling, which adjoins Bexleyheath. Bush came from an artistic background: her mother was an amateur traditional Irish dancer, her father was an amateur pianist, Paddy worked as a musical instrument maker, and John was a poet and photographer. Both brothers were involved in the local folk music scene. She was brought up a Roman Catholic.

Bush trained at Goldsmiths College karate club, where her brother John was a karate instructor. There, she became known as "Ee-ee" because of her squeaky kiai.

Her family's musical influence inspired Bush to teach herself the piano at the age of 11. She also played the organ in a barn behind her parents' house and studied the violin. She soon began composing songs, eventually adding her own lyrics.

=== 1973–1977: Career beginnings ===
Bush attended St Joseph's Convent Grammar School, a Catholic girls' school in nearby Abbey Wood. During this time her family produced a demonstration tape with over 50 of her compositions, which was turned down by record labels. Pink Floyd guitarist David Gilmour received the demo from Ricky Hopper, a mutual friend of Gilmour and the Bush family. The 1973 song "Passing Through Air" was recorded as a demo at Gilmour's studio a few weeks after her 15th birthday, and later was the earliest Kate Bush recording to be released officially.

Impressed, Gilmour financed the 16-year-old Bush's recording of a more professional demo tape. The tape consisted of three tracks, produced by Gilmour's friend Andrew Powell and the sound engineer Geoff Emerick, who had worked with the Beatles. Powell later produced Bush's first two albums. The tape was sent to the EMI executive Terry Slater, who signed Bush.

"Every female you see at a piano is either Lynsey de Paul or Carole King. And most male music—not all of it but the good stuff—really lays it on you. It really puts you against the wall and that's what I like to do. I'd like my music to intrude. Not many females succeed with that."

— Bush, speaking to Melody Maker magazine in 1977

The British record industry was reaching a point of stagnation. Progressive rock was popular, and visually-oriented rock performers were becoming increasingly popular; consequently, record labels looking for the next big thing were considering experimental acts. Bush was put on retainer for two years by Bob Mercer, managing director of EMI's group-repertoire division. Although Mercer believed that Bush's material was good enough to release, he was also of the opinion that should the album fail, it would be demoralising, and that if it were successful, Bush was too young to handle this. In a 1987 interview, Gilmour disputed this version of events, blaming EMI for initially using the "wrong" producers.

EMI gave Bush a large advance, which she used to enroll in interpretive dance classes taught by Lindsay Kemp, a former teacher of David Bowie, and mime training with Adam Darius. For the first two years of her contract, Bush spent more time on schoolwork than recording. She left school after doing her mock A-Levels and having gained ten GCE O-Level qualifications.

Bush wrote and recorded demos of almost 200 songs, some of which circulated as bootlegs. From March to August 1977, she fronted the KT Bush Band at public houses in London. The band included Del Palmer (bass), Brian Bath (guitar) and Vic King (drums). She began recording her first album in August 1977.

=== 1978–1979: The Kick Inside and Lionheart ===
Perhaps its keen ear for adolescent angst is part of what makes "Wuthering Heights" so special. She appeared on Top of the Pops with it five times in 1978, cementing her public image as an ethereal spirit, embodying the essence of Cathy through a combination of wide eyes, floaty fabrics and wild choreography, still fondly mimicked and parodied today. "Wuthering Heights" turned Bush into a pop star, the rules of which she continues to bend to her own will: her individuality was set in stone from the very beginning.

— Rebecca Nicholson in The Guardian

For her debut album, The Kick Inside (1978), Bush was persuaded to use established session musicians instead of the KT Bush Band. She retained some of these even after she had brought her bandmates back on board. Her brother Paddy played the harmonica and mandolin. Stuart Elliott played some of the drums and became her main drummer on subsequent albums. The Kick Inside was released when Bush was 19, and includes some songs written when she was as young as 13.

EMI originally wanted the more rock-oriented track "James and the Cold Gun" to be her debut single, but Bush, who already had a reputation for asserting herself in decisions about her work, insisted that it should be "Wuthering Heights". Two music videos with similar choreography were created by Bush to accompany the song. The studio version sees her perform in a dark room with mist whilst wearing a white dress, suggesting her character is a ghost, as is the case with Cathy in the novel that inspired the song. The outside version sees Bush dancing in a grassy area on Salisbury Plain (inspired by the novel's moors) whilst wearing a red dress.

In the United Kingdom alone, The Kick Inside sold over a million copies. "Wuthering Heights" topped the UK and Australian charts and became an international hit. Bush became the first British woman to reach number one on the UK charts with a self-written song. "The Man with the Child in His Eyes" made it onto the US Billboard Hot 100 where it reached number 85 in early 1979, and went on to win her an Ivor Novello Award in 1979 for Outstanding British Lyric. According to Guinness World Records, Bush was the first female artist in pop history to have written every track on a million-selling debut album.

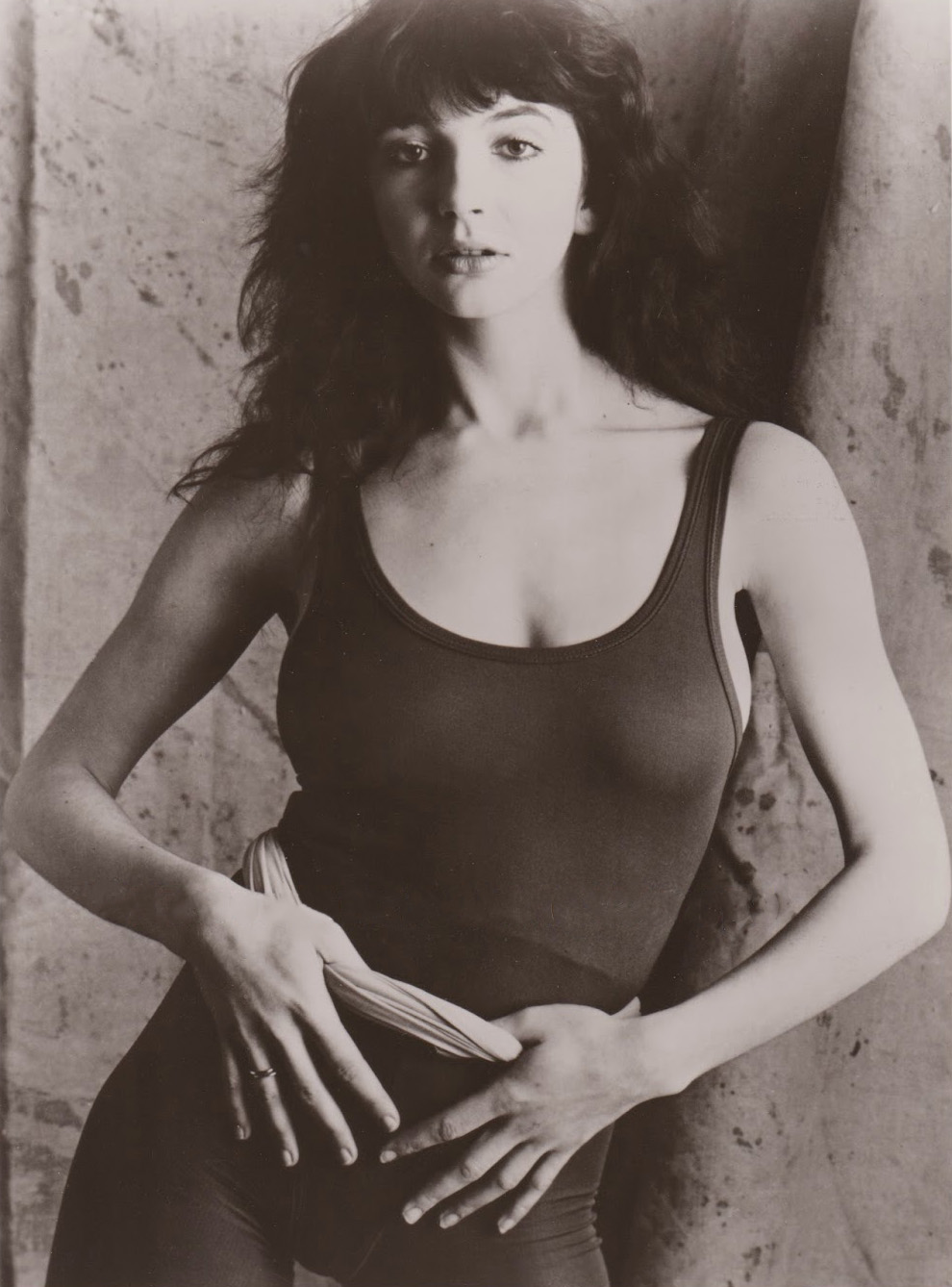
Bush in 1978

Bob Mercer blamed Bush's lesser success in the United States on American radio formats, saying there were no outlets for Bush's visual presentation. EMI capitalised on Bush's appearance by promoting the album with a poster of her in a tight pink top which emphasised her breasts. In an interview with NME in 1982, Bush criticised the choice: "People weren't even generally aware that I wrote my own songs or played the piano. The media just promoted me as a female body. It's like I've had to prove that I'm an artist in a female body."

In late 1978, EMI persuaded Bush to quickly record a follow-up album, Lionheart, to take advantage of the success of The Kick Inside. The album was produced by Andrew Powell, assisted by Bush. Although it gained a high number of sales and spawned the hit single "Wow", it did not achieve the success of The Kick Inside, reaching number six in the UK album charts. She went on to express dissatisfaction with Lionheart, feeling that it had needed more time.

Bush set up her own publishing company, Kate Bush Music, and her own management company, Novercia, to maintain control of her work. The board of directors comprised members of her family, along with Bush herself. Following the release of Lionheart, she was required by EMI to undertake heavy promotional work and an exhausting tour. The Tour of Life began in April 1979 and lasted six weeks. It was described by The Guardian as "an extraordinary, hydra-headed beast, combining music, dance, poetry, mime, burlesque, magic and theatre". The show was co-devised and performed on stage with magician Simon Drake. Bush was involved in every aspect of the production, choreography, set design, costume design and hiring. The shows were noted for her dancing, complex lighting and her 17 costume changes per show. Because of her need to dance as she sang, sound engineers used a wire coat hanger and a radio microphone to fashion a headset microphone; it was the first use by a rock performer since the Spotnicks used a rudimentary version in the early 1960s. Bush's first experience as a producer was on her live On Stage EP, released in August 1979.

=== 1980–1984: Never for Ever and The Dreaming ===
"Artists shouldn't be made famous. They have this huge aura of almost god-like quality about them, just because their craft makes a lot of money. And at the same time it is a forced importance... It is man-made so the press can feed off it."

— Kate Bush in a 1980 interview

Released in September 1980, Never for Ever was Bush's second foray into production, co-producing with Jon Kelly. The first two albums had resulted in a definitive sound evident in every track, with orchestral arrangements supporting the live band sound. The range of styles on Never for Ever is much more diverse, veering from the straightforward rocker "Violin" to the wistful waltz of hit single "Army Dreamers".

Never for Ever was her first album to feature synthesisers and drum machines, in particular the Fairlight CMI. She was introduced to the technology while providing backing vocals on Peter Gabriel's eponymous third album in early 1980. It was her first record to reach the top position in the UK album charts, also making her the first female British artist to achieve that status, and the first female artist ever to enter the album chart at No. 1. The top-selling single from the album was "Babooshka", which reached No. 5 in the UK singles chart. In November 1980, she released the standalone Christmas single "December Will Be Magic Again", which reached No. 29 in the UK charts.

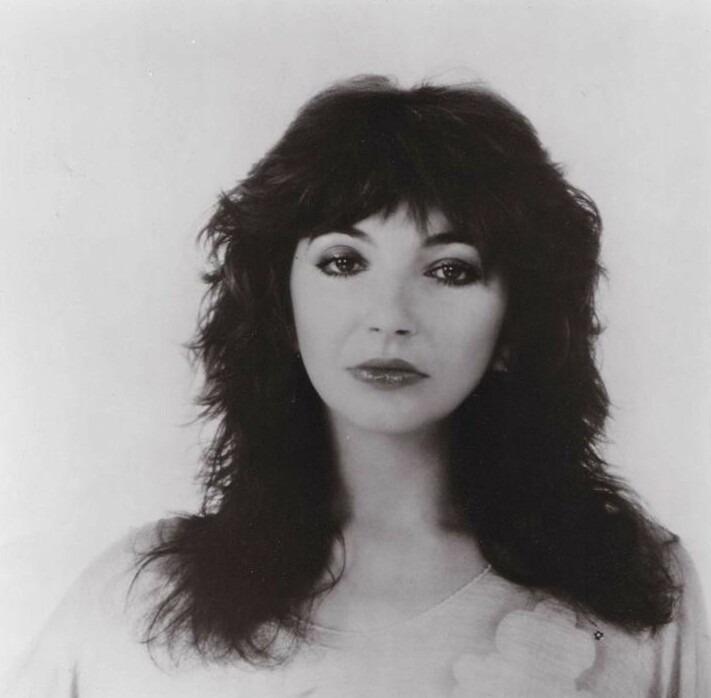
Bush in 1982

September 1982 saw the release of The Dreaming, the first album Bush produced by herself. With her new-found freedom, she experimented with production techniques, creating an album that features a diverse blend of musical styles and is known for its near-exhaustive use of the Fairlight CMI. The Dreaming received a mixed reception in the UK, and critics were baffled by the dense soundscapes Bush had created to become "less accessible". In a 1993 interview with Q magazine, Bush stated: "That was my 'She's gone mad' album." The album entered the UK album chart at No. 3, but is to date her lowest-selling album, garnering "only" a silver disc. The album became her first to enter the US Billboard 200 chart, albeit only reaching No. 157.

"Sat in Your Lap" was the first single from the album to be released. It preceded the album by over a year and peaked at No. 11 in the UK. The title track, featuring Rolf Harris and Percy Edwards, stalled at No. 48, while the third single, "There Goes a Tenner", stalled at No. 93, despite promotion from EMI and Bush. The track "Suspended in Gaffa" was released as a single in Europe, but not in the UK.

Continuing in her storytelling tradition, Bush looked far outside her own personal experience for sources of inspiration. She drew on old crime films for "There Goes a Tenner", a documentary about the Vietnam War for "Pull Out the Pin", and the plight of Indigenous Australians for "The Dreaming". "Houdini" is about that magician's death, and "Get Out of My House" was inspired by Stephen King's novel The Shining.

=== 1985–1988: Hounds of Love and The Whole Story ===
Hounds of Love was released in 1985. Because of the high cost of hiring studio space for her previous album, she built a private studio near her home, where she could work at her own pace. Hounds of Love topped the charts in the UK, knocking Madonna's Like a Virgin from the number-one position.

The album takes advantage of the vinyl and cassette formats with two different sides. The first side, Hounds of Love, contains five "accessible" pop songs, including the four singles "Running Up That Hill", "Cloudbusting", "Hounds of Love" and "The Big Sky". "Running Up That Hill" reached No. 3 in the UK charts and re-introduced Bush to American listeners, climbing to No. 30 on the Billboard Hot 100 in November 1985. Bush has stated that she initially wanted to name the song "A Deal With God", but the record company was reluctant because some people might think it was "a sensitive title", but that "... for me, this is still called A Deal With God". The second side of the album, The Ninth Wave, takes its name from Tennyson's poem "Idylls of the King", about the legendary King Arthur's reign, and is seven interconnecting songs joined in one continuous piece of music.

The album earned Bush nominations for Best Female Solo Artist, Best Album, Best Single and Best Producer at the 1986 Brit Awards. In the same year, Bush and Peter Gabriel had a UK Top 10 hit with the duet "Don't Give Up", Dolly Parton, Gabriel's original choice to sing the female vocal, turned his offer down. EMI released Bush's "greatest hits" album, The Whole Story. Bush provided a new lead vocal and refreshed backing track on "Wuthering Heights", and recorded a new single, "Experiment IV", for inclusion on the compilation. Dawn French and Hugh Laurie were among those featured in the video for Experiment IV. At the 1987 Brit Awards, Bush won the award for Best British Female Solo Artist.

=== 1989–1993: The Sensual World and The Red Shoes ===
Released in 1989, The Sensual World was described by Bush herself as "her most honest, personal album". One of the tracks, "Heads We're Dancing", inspired by her own black humour, is about a woman who dances all night with a charming stranger only to discover in the morning that he is Adolf Hitler. The title track drew its inspiration from James Joyce's novel Ulysses. The Sensual World went on to become her biggest-selling album in the US, receiving an RIAA Gold certification four years after its release for 500,000 copies sold. In the United Kingdom album charts, it reached the number-two position. Another single from the album, "This Woman's Work", was featured in the John Hughes film She's Having a Baby, and a slightly remixed and reworked version appeared on Bush's album The Sensual World. The song reached number-eight in 2005 on the UK download chart after featuring in a British television advertisement for the charity NSPCC.

"I don't think of myself as a musician. As a writer, I suppose. I only ever play the piano to accompany myself singing. I could never sit and read a piece of music. At best, I'm an accompanist. I suppose the worst thing is frustration at your own ability. Not being able to do what you want to do."

— Kate Bush, Q, 1993

In 1990, the boxed set This Woman's Work was released; it included all of her albums with their original cover art, as well as two discs featuring the majority of her singles' B-sides recorded from 1978 to 1990. In 1991, Bush released a cover of Elton John's "Rocket Man", which reached number 12 on the UK singles chart, and reached number two in Australia. In 2007, it was voted by readers of The Observer newspaper as the greatest ever cover version. Another John cover, "Candle in the Wind", was the B-side. In the same year, she starred in the black comedy film Les Dogs, produced by The Comic Strip for BBC television. Bush plays the bride Angela at a wedding set in a post-apocalyptic Britain.

Bush's seventh studio album, The Red Shoes, was released in November 1993. The album gave Bush her highest chart position in the US, reaching number 28, although the only song from the album to make the US singles chart was "Rubberband Girl", which peaked at number 88 in January 1994. In the UK, the album reached number-two, and the singles "Rubberband Girl", "The Red Shoes", "Moments of Pleasure" and "And So Is Love" (featuring Eric Clapton on guitar) all reached the top 30. Bush directed and starred in the short film The Line, the Cross and the Curve, which featured music from her album The Red Shoes, itself inspired by the 1948 film of that name. It was released on VHS in the UK in 1994 and also received a small number of cinema screenings around the world.

The initial plan had been to tour behind the release of The Red Shoes, but this idea was abandoned. Thus, Bush deliberately produced her tracks live, with less studio production that had typified her last three albums and which would have been too difficult to re-create on stage. The result polarised her fan base, who had enjoyed the intricacy of her earlier compositions, with other fans claiming they had found new complexities in the lyrics and the emotions they expressed.

During this period Bush suffered a series of bereavements, including the loss of guitarist Alan Murphy, who had begun working with her on The Tour of Life in 1979, and her mother Hannah, to whom she was exceptionally close. The people Bush lost were honoured in the ballad "Moments of Pleasure", although her mother was still alive when "Moments of Pleasure" was written and recorded. Bush has described playing the song to her mother, who thought the line where she is quoted by Bush as saying that "Every old sock meets an old shoe" was hilarious; Bush said that her mother "couldn't stop laughing".

=== 1994–2006: Motherhood, hiatus and Aerial ===
After the release of The Red Shoes, Bush dropped out of the public eye. She had originally intended to take one year off, but despite working on material, twelve years passed before her next album release. Her name occasionally cropped up in the media with rumours of a new album release. The press often viewed her as an eccentric recluse, sometimes drawing a comparison with Miss Havisham from Charles Dickens's Great Expectations. In 1998, Bush gave birth to Albert, known as "Bertie", fathered by guitarist Dan McIntosh, whom she met in 1992. In 2001, Bush was awarded a Q Award as Classic Songwriter. In 2002, she was awarded an Ivor Novello Award for Outstanding Contribution to Music, and performed "Comfortably Numb" at David Gilmour's concert at the Royal Festival Hall in London.

Bush's eighth studio album, Aerial, was released on double CD and vinyl in November 2005. The album single "King of the Mountain", had received its premiere on BBC Radio 2 on 1 September 2005. The single entered the UK Downloads Chart at number six, and would become Bush's third-highest-charting single ever in the UK, peaking at number four on the full chart. Aerial entered the UK albums chart at number three, and the US chart at number 48.

Aerial, like Hounds of Love (1985), is divided into two sections, each with its own theme and mood. The first disc, subtitled A Sea of Honey, features a set of unrelated themed songs, including "King of the Mountain"; "Bertie", a Renaissance-style ode to her son; and "Joanni", based on the story of Joan of Arc. In the song "π", Bush sings 117 digits of the number pi. The second disc, subtitled A Sky of Honey, features one continuous piece of music describing the experience of 24 hours passing by. Aerial earned Bush two nominations at the 2006 Brit Awards, for Best British Female Solo Artist and Best British Album.

=== 2007–2013: Fish People, Director's Cut and 50 Words for Snow ===
In 2007, Bush was asked to write a song for The Golden Compass soundtrack which made reference to the lead character, Lyra Belacqua. The song, "Lyra", was played over the closing credits of the film. The single reached No 187 in the UK singles chart and was nominated for the International Press Academy's Satellite Award for original song in a motion picture. According to Del Palmer, Bush was asked to compose the song at short notice; the project was completed in 10 days.

In May 2011, Bush released Director's Cut, comprising 11 reworked tracks from The Sensual World and The Red Shoes, recorded using analogue rather than digital equipment. All the tracks have new lead vocals, drums and instrumentation. Some were transposed to a lower key to accommodate her lowering voice. Three of the songs, including "This Woman's Work", have been completely rerecorded, often with lyrics changed in places. Bush described the album as a new project rather than a collection of remixes. It was the first album on her new label, Fish People, a division of EMI Records. In addition to Director's Cut in its single CD form, the album was released with a box-set that contains the albums The Sensual World and the analogue re-mastered The Red Shoes. It debuted at No. 2 on the United Kingdom chart.

Bush's tenth studio album, 50 Words for Snow, was released on 21 November 2011. It features Elton John in the duet "Snowed in at Wheeler Street". The album contains seven new songs "set against a backdrop of falling snow", with a total running time of 65 minutes. The album's songs are built around Bush's quietly jazzy piano and Steve Gadd's drums, and use both sung and spoken word vocals in what Classic Rock critic Stephen Dalton calls "a ... supple and experimental affair, with a contemporary chamber pop sound grounded in crisp piano, minimal percussion and light-touch electronics ... billowing jazz-rock soundscapes, interwoven with fragmentary narratives delivered in a range of voices from shrill to Laurie Anderson-style cooing". Bassist Danny Thompson appears on the album, while the sixth track on the album, "50 Words for Snow", features the voice of Stephen Fry reciting a list of words to describe snow.

50 Words for Snow received general acclaim from music critics. At Metacritic, which assigns a normalised rating out of 100 to reviews from mainstream critics, the album received an average score of 88, based on 26 reviews, which indicates "universal acclaim". At the 2012 Brit Awards she was nominated in the Best Female Artist category, and the album won the 2012 Best Album at the South Bank Arts Awards, and was also nominated for Best Album at the Ivor Novello Awards.

Bush turned down an invitation to perform at the 2012 Summer Olympics closing ceremony in London. Instead, a new vocal remix of her 1985 single "Running Up That Hill" was played. In 2013, Bush became the only female artist to have top five albums in the UK charts in five successive decades.

=== 2014–2021: Before the Dawn and remastered catalogue ===
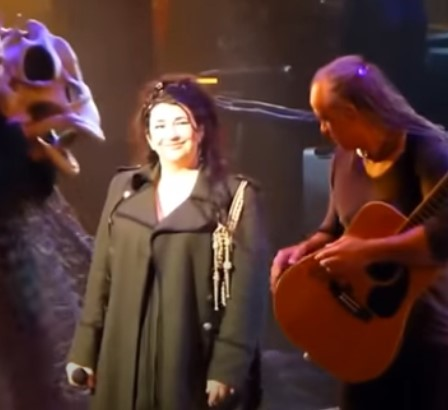
Bush performing at Before the Dawn at Hammersmith Apollo in London in September 2014

In March 2014, Bush announced her first live concerts in decades: Before the Dawn, a 22-night residency in London running from 26 August to 1 October 2014 at the Hammersmith Apollo. Tickets sold out in 15 minutes. The concerts received acclaim. A live album, Before the Dawn, was released on 25 November 2016.

In a statement, Bush said,

It was an extraordinary experience putting the show together. It was a huge amount of work, a lot of fun and an enormous privilege to work with such an incredibly talented team. This is the audio document. I hope that this can stand alone as a piece of music in its own right and that it can be enjoyed by people who knew nothing about the shows as well as those who were there. I never expected the overwhelming response of the audiences, every night filling the show with life and excitement. They are there in every beat of the recorded music. Even when you can't hear them, you can feel them.

Bolstered by publicity around Before the Dawn, Bush became the first female performer to have eight albums in the UK Top 40 Albums Chart simultaneously, putting her at number three for simultaneous UK Top 40 albums. The only artists ahead of Bush were Elvis Presley, who had 12 entries in the top 40 after his death in 1977, and the Beatles who had 11 in 2009. She had 11 albums in the top 50.

In November 2018, Bush released two box sets of remasters of her studio albums. Vocals from Rolf Harris, who was convicted of multiple sexual assault charges in 2014, were replaced with versions by Bush's son Bertie. On 6 December 2018, Bush published her first book, How to Be Invisible, a compilation of lyrics.

A compilation of rare tracks, cover versions and remixes from the boxsets, The Other Sides, was released on 8 March 2019. It includes the previously unreleased track "Humming", recorded in 1975. In September 2019, Bush released "Ne t'enfuis pas" / "Un baiser d'enfant" on vinyl, in France, as a limited-edition promotional single.

In September 2020, Bush became a Fellow of The Ivors Academy, the UK's independent professional association for songwriters, composers and music authors. Following Bush's award, another Fellow, Annie Lennox, commented, "She is visionary and iconic and has made her own magical stamp upon the zeitgeist of the British cultural landscape."

=== 2022–present: Resurgence and continued honours ===
Bush's 1985 single "Running Up That Hill" gained newfound popularity in May 2022 after it was incorporated into the plot of the fourth season of the Netflix series Stranger Things. It became the most streamed song on Spotify in the United States, the United Kingdom, Ireland, Canada, Australia, New Zealand and globally. Winona Ryder, who played the character Joyce Byers in Stranger Things, said she had pushed for the song to be on the show: "I've been obsessed with her since I was a little girl. I've also for the last seven years been dropping hints on set wearing my Kate Bush T-shirts." According to The Guardian, "Running Up That Hill" has become particularly popular with members of Generation Z, who were not born when the song was first released, and it has appeared in numerous videos on the social media platform TikTok. Bush released a statement praising Stranger Things and saying the resurgence was "really exciting."

On 10 June 2022, "Running Up That Hill" reached number two on the UK singles chart, surpassing its peak of number three in 1985. It was the most popular track of the week in the UK, ahead of "As It Was" by Harry Styles, but a pre-existing chart rule penalised older songs that are streamed. The Chart Supervisory Committee responded by giving the record an exemption from the "accelerated chart ratio" rule due to its ongoing sales resurgence.

On 17 June, the song reached number one in the UK, making it Bush's second UK number one. It broke three UK chart records in the process. With 44 years since her last number one, "Wuthering Heights" in 1978, Bush surpassed Tom Jones's 42-year gap between number ones and replaced Cher as the oldest female solo chart-topping artist at 63 years and 11 months. Bush also achieved the record for a single with the longest period taken to reach number one, beating the previous record, held by "Last Christmas" by Wham!, by a year.

On 11 June 2022, "Running Up That Hill" re-entered the US Billboard Hot 100 at number eight, surpassing its 1985 peak at No 30 and becoming Bush's first US top-ten hit. The following week, it climbed to No 4 in the US, before reaching No 3 on 25 July. The parent album, Hounds of Love, also reached a new peak in the US, charting at No 12. The song topped the Australian ARIA Charts to become her second No 1 single in the country. In France, "Running Up That Hill" beat its original chart peak of 24, placing at No 3. Hounds of Love also rose in popularity on various album charts; it reached No. 1 on Billboard's Top Alternative Albums chart, making it Bush's first US chart-topping album. On 10 June, The Whole Story rose from No. 76 to No. 19 on the UK Albums Chart, peaking a week later at No 17. A limited edition CD single was released by Rhino. in September 2022, published in this format for the first time, the 2022 film A Man Called Otto featured the song "This Woman's Work" from Bush's album The Sensual World. In May 2023, that song was also featured in the Netflix film The Mother, spiking a sales resurgence for the song.

On 1 January 2023, Bush was included at No 60 in the list of 200 Best Singers of All Time by Rolling Stone. On 22 February 2023, Bush announced that her label, Fish People, had moved to a new distribution partner, The state51 Conspiracy. The new company took over distribution of her post-1980 releases (starting from The Dreaming) worldwide, and the entire catalogue in the US only. This move has also generated renewed "indie" reissues of her albums.

Bush was nominated for the Rock and Roll Hall of Fame in 2018, 2021 and 2022, and was inducted in 2023, but did not attend the ceremony. She was inducted by Big Boi of OutKast, a long-time fan of her music. In his induction speech, Big Boi said, "What I love about Kate's music is that I never know what sound I'm gonna hear next. She ignores anything that seems like a formula and instead just does whatever she wants to do, like me. She challenges me as a listener and expands my ears and my mind. No matter how many times I look to albums like The Dreaming or 50 Words for Snow, they sound fresh and surprise me every time. They fill my head with ideas and expand my ambitions for what music can achieve."

In February 2024, it was announced that Bush was an ambassador for that year's Record Store Day on 20 April 2024. Her cancelled 1993 single "Eat the Music" will be released as a 10" vinyl single. In a statement, Bush said,

Isn't it great to see how the resurgence in vinyl has taken the music industry by surprise? It had decided to leave vinyl far behind, but it would seem that not everyone agrees! I love that [...] In the same way that some people like to read a book on Kindle but also want to have a book as a physical object, a lot of people like vinyl and streaming. Both have different appeals. An album on vinyl is a beautiful thing, given a strong identity by its large-scale artwork. There's a much more personal connection with the artist and their work. The added bonus of vinyl is that it encourages people to listen to albums. An art form that I've always thought can be treasured in a unique way. This year, I hope you have a fantastic time at this very important event, and that you get to celebrate music that's been specially released for you."

On 25 October 2024, Bush released a short animated film, entitled Little Shrew, in support of War Child. The film is set to a radio edit of "Snowflake", from 50 Words for Snow. In an interview with the BBC, to promote Little Shrew, Bush revealed that she was "very keen to start working on a new album when I've got [the film] finished. I've got lots of ideas and I'm really looking forward to getting back into that creative space, it's been a long time."

In November 2024, Bush received two nominations at the 67th Grammy Awards for Best Recording Package and Best Boxed or Special Limited Edition Package for the re-editions of Hounds of Love; her first nominations since 1996.

Bush was one of more than 1,000 musicians to back an album of silence released on 25 February 2025, Is This What We Want?, protesting the use of unlicensed copyrighted work to train AI. The album debuted at number 38 on the UK Albums Downloads Chart. On 26 June 2025, it was announced that Little Shrew, would be played throughout the UK before showings of the Second World War German resistance film From Hilde, With Love. On 22 September 2025, it was announced that the compilation Best of the Other Sides, an edited and re-tweaked version of 2018's The Other Sides would be released digitally on 26 September 2025, and on CD and vinyl on 31 October 2025; the digital release debuted at number 16 on the UK Albums Downloads Chart.

== Personal life ==
From the late 1970s to the early 1990s, Bush was in a relationship with bassist and sound engineer Del Palmer. Bush and guitarist Danny McIntosh have a son, Albert McIntosh, known as Bertie, born in 1998. Bertie featured in her 2014 residency Before the Dawn. Her nephew Raven Bush was a violinist in the English indie band Syd Arthur.

Bush is a former resident of Eltham in southeast London. In the 1990s she moved to a canalside residence in Sulhamstead, Berkshire, and bought a second home in Devon in 2004. Bush is a vegetarian. Bush was raised a Roman Catholic. In 1999, she said:

I would never say I was a strict follower of Roman Catholic belief, but a lot of images are in there; they have to be; they're so strong. Such powerful, beautiful, passionate images! There's a lot of suffering in Roman Catholicism. I think I'm looking for not necessarily religion, but ways of helping myself to become more understanding, more complete, a happier person ... But I really don't think I've found a niche.

The length of time between albums has led to rumours concerning Bush's health or appearance. In 2011, she told BBC Radio 4 that the amount of time between albums was stressful: "It's very frustrating the albums take as long as they do ... I wish there weren't such big gaps between them". In the same interview, she denied that she was a perfectionist, saying: "I think it's important that things are flawed ... That's what makes a piece of art interesting sometimes—the bit that's wrong or the mistake you've made that's led onto an idea you wouldn't have had otherwise." She reiterated her prioritisation of her family life.

=== Political views ===
Some of Bush's songs contain references to political and social themes, including "Breathing", which addresses the fear of nuclear warfare, and "Army Dreamers", which examines the grief felt by mothers who lose children serving in the military during war. In a 1985 interview with The NewMusic, Bush stated: "I've never felt I've written from a political point of view, it's always been an emotional point of view that just happens to perhaps be a political situation."

During the 1979 United Kingdom general election campaign, Bush, who at the time was on a live concert tour of the UK, posed for a photograph alongside the Labour Prime Minister James Callaghan. When asked about her political beliefs in a 1985 interview with Hot Press, Bush replied that she preferred not to discuss how she voted and added "I don't feel I am a political thinker at all. I don't really understand politics."

In The Comic Strip Presents... episode GLC: The Carnage Continues..., she wrote, produced and sang on the theme song "Ken", a satirical take on how Hollywood glamourises and fictionalises political figures, in this particular case Ken Livingstone, the former leader of the Greater London Council, and the lyrics parodied the theme from Shaft.

In 2016, the Canadian news magazine Maclean's published an interview in which Bush was asked about people being afraid of women holding political power. Bush pointed out that the UK, unlike the US, did have a female leader, Theresa May, who a few months earlier had become Prime Minister. The interview quoted Bush as saying: "I actually really like her and think she's wonderful. I think it's the best thing that's happened to us in a long time ... It is great to have a woman in charge of the country. She's very sensible and I think that's a good thing at this point in time." In 2019, Bush published a statement on her website saying that she was not a Conservative Party supporter, that she felt May was an improvement over the previous Prime Minister, and that she had intended only to defend women in power.

In April 2021, Bush was one of 156 signatories of an open letter to Prime Minister Boris Johnson calling for a change in the wording of the Copyright, Designs and Patents Act 1988 to make royalty payments for streaming closer to the amounts paid for radio broadcast. In December 2022, in her annual Christmas message, Bush expressed solidarity with nurses undertaking strike action, stating that NHS nurses should be "appreciated and cherished".

== Artistry ==
=== Musical style and voice ===
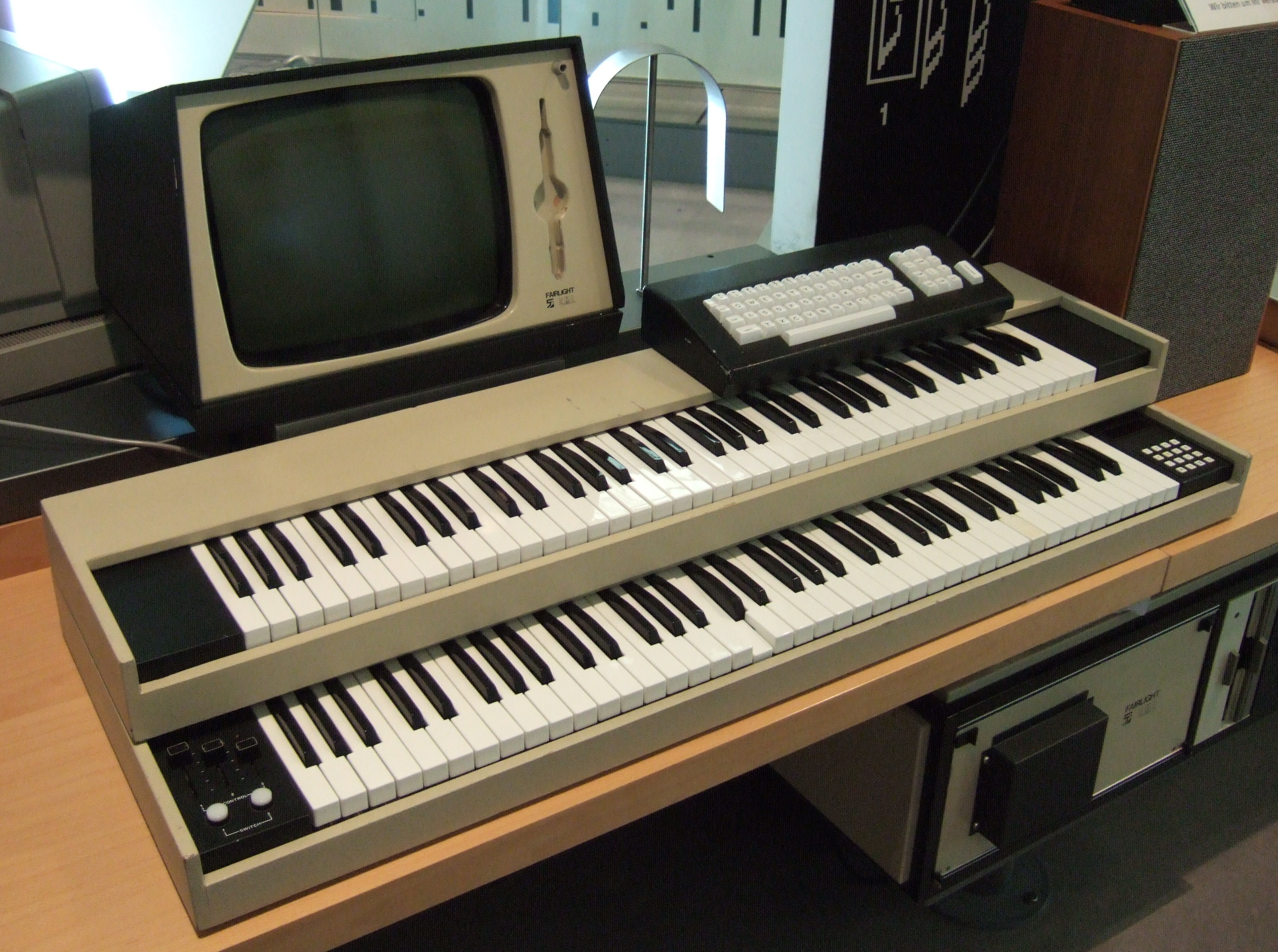
Bush has used the Fairlight CMI sampler.

Bush's musical aesthetic is eclectic; she employs varied influences and melds disparate styles, often within a single song or over the course of an album. Simon Reynolds of The Guardian called Bush "the queen of art-pop", and she has also been described as art rock, baroque pop, avant-pop, progressive pop, and post-progressive. Ben Myers of Prog called Bush "prog's first pop star and pop's first prog star" whose "career history and collaborations are inextricably tied in with prog and her ever-evolving output has much more in common with the genre than the pop world in which she first found herself operating." She has been grouped with other "'arty' 1970s and '80s British pop rock artists" such as Roxy Music and Peter Gabriel. Even in her earliest works, with piano the primary instrument, she wove together diverse influences, drawing on classical music, glam rock, and a wide range of ethnic and folk sources. This has continued throughout her career. By the time of Never for Ever, Bush had begun to make prominent use of the Fairlight CMI synthesiser, which allowed her to sample and manipulate sounds, expanding her sonic palette.

Bush has a soprano vocal range. Her vocals contain elements of British, Anglo-Irish and most prominently (southern) English accents and, in its use of musical instruments from various periods and cultures, her music has differed from American pop norms. Reviewers have used the term "surreal" to describe her music. Her songs explore melodramatic emotional and musical surrealism that defies easy categorisation. It has been observed that even her more joyous pieces are often tinged with traces of melancholy and vice versa.

=== Songwriting and influences ===
Elements of Bush's lyrics employ historical or literary references. This is embodied in her first single "Wuthering Heights", which is based on Emily Brontë's novel of the same title. She has described herself as a storyteller who embodies the character singing the song and has dismissed efforts by others to conceive of her work as autobiographical. Bush's lyrics have been known to touch on obscure or esoteric subject matter, and New Musical Express noted that Bush was not afraid to tackle sensitive and taboo subjects in her work. "The Kick Inside" is based on a traditional English folk song (The Ballad of Lucy Wan) about an incestuous pregnancy and a resulting suicide. "Kashka from Baghdad" is a song about a gay couple. She references G. I. Gurdjieff in the song "Them Heavy People", while "Cloudbusting" was inspired by Peter Reich's autobiography, A Book of Dreams, about his relationship with his father, Wilhelm Reich. "Breathing" explores the results of nuclear fallout from the perspective of a fœtus.

Other non-musical sources of inspiration for Bush include horror films, which have influenced the gothic nature of her songs, such as "Hounds of Love", which samples the 1957 horror movie Night of the Demon. "The Infant Kiss" is a song about a haunted, unstable woman's infatuation with a young boy in her care (inspired by Jack Clayton's film The Innocents (1961), which had been based on Henry James's novella The Turn of the Screw). The title of the song "Hammer Horror" is from Hammer Film Productions' horror movies, and the song's story was inspired by the film Man of a Thousand Faces (1957). Her songs have occasionally combined comedy and horror to form dark humour, such as murder by poisoning in "Coffee Homeground", an alcoholic mother in "Ran Tan Waltz", and the upbeat "The Wedding List", a song inspired by François Truffaut's 1967 film of Cornell Woolrich's The Bride Wore Black about the murder of a groom and the bride's subsequent revenge against the killer. Bush has also cited comedy as a significant influence. She has cited Woody Allen, Monty Python, Fawlty Towers, and The Young Ones as particular favourites.

=== Live performances ===
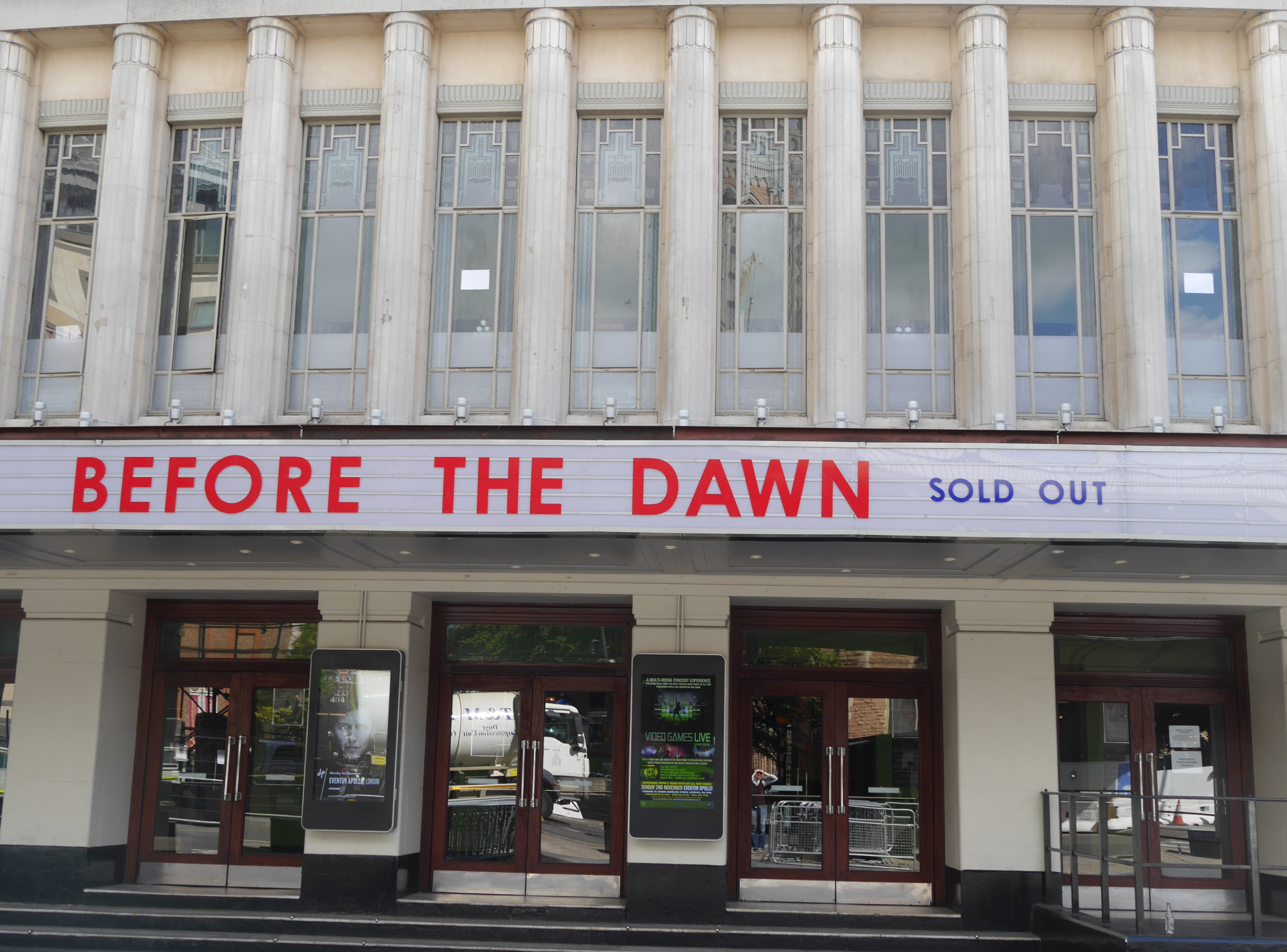
Bush's Before the Dawn concerts in 2014 at the Hammersmith Apollo in London sold out in 15 minutes.

Bush's only tour, the Tour of Life, ran for six weeks in April and May 1979, covering Britain and mainland Europe. The BBC suggested that she might have quit touring due to a fear of flying, or because of the death of a lighting engineer, Bill Duffield, who was killed in an accident after a warm-up concert. Mercer, who signed Bush to EMI, said touring was "just too hard ... I think [Bush] liked it but the equation didn't work ... I could see at the end of the show that she was completely wiped out." Bush described the tour as "enormously enjoyable" but "absolutely exhausting".

During the same period as the Tour of Life, Bush performed on television programmes including Top of the Pops in the UK, Bio's Bahnhof in Germany, and Saturday Night Live in the United States (performing "The Man with the Child in His Eyes" with Paul Shaffer on piano, and later in the programme, "Them Heavy People"), which remains her only live performance in the country. On 28 December 1979, BBC TV aired the Kate Bush Christmas Special.

In July 1982, Bush participated in the first benefit concert in aid of The Prince's Trust, singing "The Wedding List" with a backing band composed of Pete Townshend, Phil Collins, Midge Ure, Mick Karn, Gary Brooker, Dave Formula and Peter Hope Evans. The performance was later released on VHS video, Laserdisc and CED disc. She performed live for British charity event Comic Relief in 1986, singing "Do Bears... ?", a humorous duet with Rowan Atkinson, and a rendition of "Breathing". In March 1987, Bush sang "Running Up That Hill" at The Secret Policeman's Third Ball accompanied by David Gilmour. She appeared with Gilmour again in 2002, singing the Pink Floyd song "Comfortably Numb" at the Royal Festival Hall in London.

Bush returned to headline performance with a 22-night residency, Before the Dawn, which ran from 26 August to 1 October 2014 at the Hammersmith Apollo in London. The set list encompassed most of Hounds of Love featuring the entire Ninth Wave suite, most of Aerial featuring the entire An Endless Sky of Honey suite including new song "Tawny Moon", two songs from The Red Shoes, and one song from 50 Words for Snow.

=== Technical innovations ===
Bush is the first artist to have had a headset with a wireless microphone built for use in music. For her Tour of Life in 1979, she had a compact microphone combined with a self-made construction of wire clothes hangers, so that she did not have to use a hand microphone. Having her hands free allowed Bush to dance her rehearsed choreography of expressionist dance on the concert stage, and at the same time sing with a microphone. Her idea was later adopted by other artists such as Madonna and Peter Gabriel.

=== Collaborations ===
Bush provided vocals on two of Peter Gabriel's albums, including the hits "Games Without Frontiers" and "Don't Give Up", as well as "No Self-Control". Gabriel appeared on Bush's 1979 television special, where they sang a duet of Roy Harper's "Another Day". She has sung on two Roy Harper tracks: "You", on his 1980 album The Unknown Soldier; and "Once", the title track of his 1990 album. She sung on the title song of the 1986 Big Country album The Seer; the Midge Ure song "Sister and Brother" from his 1988 album Answers to Nothing; Go West's 1987 single "The King Is Dead"; and two songs with Prince—"Why Should I Love You?", from her 1993 album The Red Shoes, and "My Computer" from Prince's 1996 album Emancipation. In 1987, she sang a verse on the Beatles cover charity single "Let It Be" by Ferry Aid.

In 1990, Bush produced a song for another artist, Alan Stivell's "Kimiad" for his album Again; this is the only time she has done this to date. Stivell had appeared on The Sensual World. In 1991, Bush was invited to perform a cover of Elton John's 1972 song "Rocket Man" for the tribute album Two Rooms: Celebrating the Songs of Elton John & Bernie Taupin. In 2007 Bush's cover won The Observer readers' award for Greatest Cover of all time.

In 2011, Elton John collaborated with Bush once again on "Snowed in at Wheeler Street" for her most recent album 50 Words for Snow. In 1994, Bush covered George Gershwin's "The Man I Love" for the tribute album The Glory of Gershwin. In 1996, Bush contributed a version of "Mná na hÉireann" (Irish for "Women of Ireland") for the Anglo-Irish folk-rock compilation project Common Ground: The Voices of Modern Irish Music. Bush had to sing the song in Irish, which she learned to do phonetically.

Artists who have contributed to Bush's own albums include Elton John, Eric Clapton, Jeff Beck, David Gilmour, Roy Harper, Nigel Kennedy, Gary Brooker, Danny Thompson and Prince. Bush provided backing vocals for a song that was recorded during the 1990s titled Wouldn't Change a Thing by Lionel Azulay, the drummer with the original band that was later to become the KT Bush Band. The song, which was engineered and produced by Del Palmer, was released on Azulay's album Out of the Ashes. Bush declined a request by Erasure to produce one of their albums because, according to Vince Clarke, "she didn't feel that that was her area".

Bush has also worked with the ethnic Bulgarian group Trio Bulgarka. They provided the backing vocals on the songs "Deeper Understanding", "Never Be Mine", and "Rocket's Tail" from Bush's album The Sensual World in 1989. They also make an appearance on her 1993 album The Red Shoes on the songs "You're The One", "The Song of Solomon" and "Why Should I Love You". Bush revealed that three years prior to the making of The Sensual World, she was introduced to the group by her brother, Paddy, who is interested in cultural music.

== Legacy ==
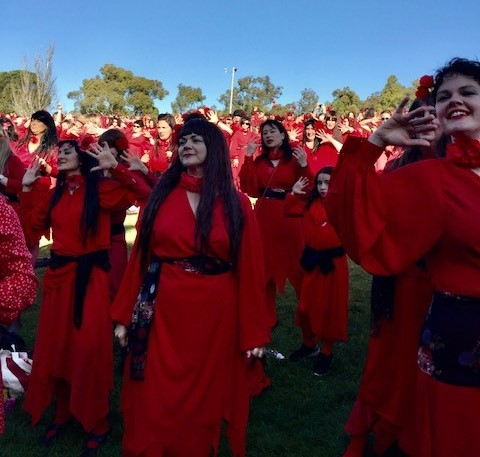
Bush fans at The Most Wuthering Heights Day Ever in Melbourne, Australia, in 2016

According to Alexis Petridis of The Guardian, Bush's "shadow looms so large that whenever a female singer-songwriter emerges who is even remotely out of the ordinary, it's only a matter of time before someone, fairly or otherwise, mentions Bush."

Musicians who have acknowledged Bush's influence include Björk, Alanis Morissette, Nigel Godrich, Florence Welch, Fever Ray, Big Boi, Regina Spektor, Teddy Sinclair, Fiona Apple, Imogen Heap, Sharon Van Etten, Ellie Goulding, Kyros, Aisles, PinkPantheress, FKA Twigs, Neil Hannon of the Divine Comedy, Grimes, Solange Knowles, Julia Holter, Angel Olsen, Halsey, Tupac Shakur, Robyn, Caroline Polachek, Chappell Roan and Aimee Osbourne.

Since she made the bold decision after only six weeks on the road in 1979 that she wouldn't play live again, yet continued to be a powerhouse of inventive avant pop for the next 15 years—and a sporadic, off-the-grid presence ever since—Bush has set the blueprint for the autonomous artist creating masterworks entirely at their own pace and on their own terms. Kate Bush is the definitive example of a musician allowing work to flow through her life, not cram life into the spaces between her work.

— Mark Beaumont writing for NME on Bush being an "enigma worthy of the name", July 2018

In 2015, Adele stated that the release of her third studio album 25 was inspired by Bush's 2014 comeback to the stage. Nerina Pallot was inspired to become a songwriter after seeing Bush play "This Woman's Work" on Wogan. Bush was described by The Guardian as an "early role model" for Dido. The Australian singer-songwriter Sia described Bush as one of the "weird" artists she "grew up with", along with Adam Ant, Boy George and Cyndi Lauper. k.d. lang named Bush as one of the artists she was listening to when she was starting to write songs.

Jack Antonoff has described Bush as an artist he listens to when he writes songs. Andy Bell described Bush as "a major influence on a lot of Erasure's album tracks". When Little Boots was asked about female producers or songwriters that have inspired her, she highlighted Bush for "how involved she got with the studio side as well as the performance". Kate Nash described Bush as "really amazing and really inspirational". Bat for Lashes also called her "a real inspiration".

Tegan and Sara called Bush a "huge influence" on them when they were growing up in the 1980s, and Sky Ferreira named her when asked about her "primary influences" from that decade. Rosalía named Bush as one of the female artists who made success possible for artists like her. Beverley Craven acknowledged that when she was beginning to write songs, she was "trying to sound like Kate Bush". Tim Bowness of No-Man named Bush as one of his early influences.

Elton John cited Bush's duet with Peter Gabriel, "Don't Give Up", for helping him to become sober, particularly Bush's lyric, "Rest your head. You worry too much. It's going to be all right. When times get rough you can fall back on us. Don't give up." He stated, "she [Bush] played a big part in my rebirth." After doing a duet with Bush in 2011, John praised her talents as a musician, stating "I'm so proud to be on a Kate Bush record; she's always marched to the beat of her own drum. She was groundbreaking—a bit like a female equivalent of Freddie Mercury. She does come out socially sometimes and she came to my civil partnership occasion with her husband. There were so many stars in the room, but all the musicians there were only interested in saying, 'You've got to introduce me to Kate Bush.' I remember Boy George saying, 'Oh my God, is that Kate Bush?' I said, 'Yeah!'"

Bush was one of the singers whom Prince thanked in the liner notes of 1991's Diamonds and Pearls. Kirk Hammett of Metallica listed Bush as one of the influences on Master of Puppets. According to an unauthorised biography, Courtney Love of Hole listened to Bush among other artists as a teenager. Tricky of Massive Attack wrote an article about The Kick Inside, saying: "Her music has always sounded like dreamland to me.... I don't believe in God, but if I did, her music would be my bible". John Lydon, better known as Johnny Rotten of the Sex Pistols, declared her work to be "beauty beyond belief." Rotten once wrote a song for her, titled "Bird in Hand" (about exploitation of parrots) that Bush rejected. In 1999, VH1 named Bush the 46th-greatest woman in rock and roll.

Marianne Faithfull said that Bush's four-octave range should be regarded as a "national treasure". "My favourite instrument in the whole world is the human female voice, and Kate Bush is one of the reasons why. It is, by far, a Stradivarius," Faithfull stated. "Which is why she rarely deals with the press or isn't in a rush to record. She's one of the few who can be above all that." Enya praised Bush in a similar manner: "When you think of Kate Bush, you think of the music, not the headlines." Rufus Wainwright named Bush one of his top ten gay icons. Outside music, Bush has been an inspiration to several fashion designers, including Hussein Chalayan. In 1998 an asteroid was named after Bush.

In 2019, French record producer Pone, who is paralysed from amyotrophic lateral sclerosis, released Kate & Me, an entire album created from samples of Kate Bush's work. According to The Guardian, it's the "first album in history to be entirely produced through an eye-tracking device". Pone declares that Bush is the greatest artist of the past 40 years. Pone reiterated the experience in June 2021 by publishing Listen And Donate. An EP composed of four tracks including two originals by Pone, still based on samples of Kate Bush's work, and two remixes produced by SCH and Para One. JR signs the visual part of the project. The goal is to raise funds for the Trakadom association, created by Pone and two doctors in collaboration with the intensive care unit of the hospital of Nîmes.

In 2020, Grazia magazine conducted an interview with UK Prime Minister Boris Johnson. When asked about the five most influential women in his life, Johnson placed Kate Bush at the fifth spot after deliberating between nominating Queen Elizabeth II, Margaret Thatcher and Bush.

In addition to her music, her dancing has been critically acclaimed and proven influential, as well as enduring in the popular consciousness. Critics have noted her "pioneering synthesis of music and movement" and called her work "modern dance at its most powerful". Prix Benois de la Danse winner Sidi Larbi Cherkaoui credits her dancing as a formative influence. For the recurring The Most Wuthering Heights Day Ever event, thousands of people gather worldwide to recreate her dance routine from the "Wuthering Heights" music video—the outside version where Bush is seen dancing "out in the wily, windy moors", adorned with flowers and a flowy red dress.

== Awards and nominations ==
To date, Bush has received 13 nominations for BRIT Awards throughout her career, winning once in 1987.

== Discography ==
Studio albums

- The Kick Inside (1978)
- Lionheart (1978)
- Never for Ever (1980)
- The Dreaming (1982)
- Hounds of Love (1985)
- The Sensual World (1989)
- The Red Shoes (1993)
- Aerial (2005)
- 50 Words for Snow (2011)

== Tours ==
Concert tours

- The Tour of Life (1979)

Concert residences

- Before the Dawn (2014)

== See also ==
- List of British Grammy Award winners and nominees
