= The Futureheads discography =

- Studio albums: 6
- Singles: 12
- Music videos: 11
- Other releases: 3

The Futureheads are an English four-piece post-punk revival band. They have released four studio albums and twelve singles, five of which have entered the UK Singles Chart.

== Studio albums ==
List of studio albums, with selected chart positions
Title	Album details	Peak chart positions									Certifications
Title	Album details	UK	UK Indie	UK R&B	AUS Hit.	EUR	IRL	JPN	SCO	US Heat	Certifications
The Futureheads	Released: 12 July 2004; Labels: 679 Recordings, Sire	11	—	40	—	44	28	—	96	—	BPI: Gold
News and Tributes	Released: 29 May 2006; Labels: 679, Vagrant	12	—	—	7	52	49	136	8	14	
This Is Not the World	Released: 26 May 2008; Labels: Nul	17	2	—	11	65	—	259	20	27	
The Chaos	Released: 26 April 2010; Labels: Nul	48	3	—	—	—	—	—	65	—	
Rant	Released: 2 April 2012; Labels: Nul	125	20	—	—	—	—	—	—	—	
Powers	Released: 30 August 2019; Labels: Nul	53	2	—	—	—	—	—	34	—	
"—" denotes releases that did not chart.

== EPs ==
List of EPs, with selected chart positions
Title	EP details	Peak chart positions	
Title	EP details	UK Budget	UK Indie
Nul Book Standard EP	Released: 2002; Label: Project Cosmonaut	—	—
1-2-3-Nul! EP	Released: 2003; Label: Fantastic Plastic Records	17	46
Area EP	Released: 28 November 2005; Label: 679 Recordings	—	—
"—" denotes releases that did not chart.

== Singles ==
List of singles, with selected chart positions, showing year released and album name
Title	Year	Peak chart positions								Certifications	Album
Title	Year	UK	UK Indie	UK Rock	AUS	EUR	IRL	POL	SCO	Certifications	Album
"First Day"	2004	58	6	6	—	—	—	—	100		The Futureheads
"Decent Days and Nights"	2004	26	—	—	—	79	—	—	41		The Futureheads
"Meantime"	2004	49	—	—	—	—	—	—	56		The Futureheads
"Hounds of Love"	2005	8	—	—	—	31	26	—	7	BPI: Gold	The Futureheads
"Decent Days and Nights" (re-issue)	2005	26	—	—	— (Note: "Decent Days and Nights" did not enter the Australian ARIA Singles Chart but peaked at number 20 on the ARIA Hitseekers Chart.)	87	—	—	24		The Futureheads
"Area"	2005	18	—	—	—	62	50	—	15		Area EP
"Skip to the End"	2006	24	—	—	—	78	46	—	20		News And Tributes
"Worry About It Later"	2006	52	—	—	—	—	—	—	28		News And Tributes
"The Beginning of the Twist"	2008	20	1	—	82	66	—	46	14		This Is Not the World
"Radio Heart"	2008	65	1	—	—	—	—	—	21		This Is Not the World
"Walking Backwards"	2008	— (Note: "Walking Backwards" did not enter the UK Singles Chart, but peaked at number 44 on the Official Physical Singles Chart Top 100.)	6	—	—	—	—	—	46		This Is Not the World
"I Wouldn't Be Like This if You Were Here"	2009	—	—	—	—	—	—	—	—		Non-album single
"Heartbeat Song"	2010	34	1	—	—	92	—	—	28		The Chaos
"I Can Do That"	2010	— (Note: "I Can Do That" did not enter the UK Singles Chart, but peaked at number 99 on the UK Radio Play Top 100.)	—	—	—	—	—	—	—		The Chaos
"Christmas Was Better In The 80s"	2010	—	26	—	—	—	—	—	—		Non-album single
"Acapella"	2011	—	—	—	—	—	—	—	—		Rant
"Meet Me Halfway"	2012	—	—	—	—	—	—	—	—		Rant
"The No. 1 Song In Heaven"	2012	— (Note: "The No. 1 Song In Heaven" did not enter the UK Singles Chart, but peaked at number 55 on the UK Physical Singles Chart.)	—	—	—	—	—	—	—		Rant
"Beeswing"	2012	—	—	—	—	—	—	—	—		Rant
"Jekyll"	2019	—	—	—	—	—	—	—	—		Powers
"Good Night Out"	2019	—	—	—	—	—	—	—	—		Powers
"Listen, Little Man!"	2019	—	—	—	—	—	—	—	—		Powers
"—" denotes a release that did not chart.

== Free downloads ==
- "A To B" (2004)
- "Broke Up The Time" (November 2007 — released as an album three preview)
- "Crash" (December 2007 — released a mailing list only Christmas exclusive. Was recorded during TINTW sessions.)
- "Struck Dumb" (November 2009)
- "Heartbeat Song" (A Capella) (14 February 2012)

== Compilations ==
- Music from the OC: Mix 4 (2005 • Warner Bros./Wea)
- Grandma's Boy Original Soundtrack with the song "Meantime".
