= List of UK Independent Singles Chart number ones of 2008 =

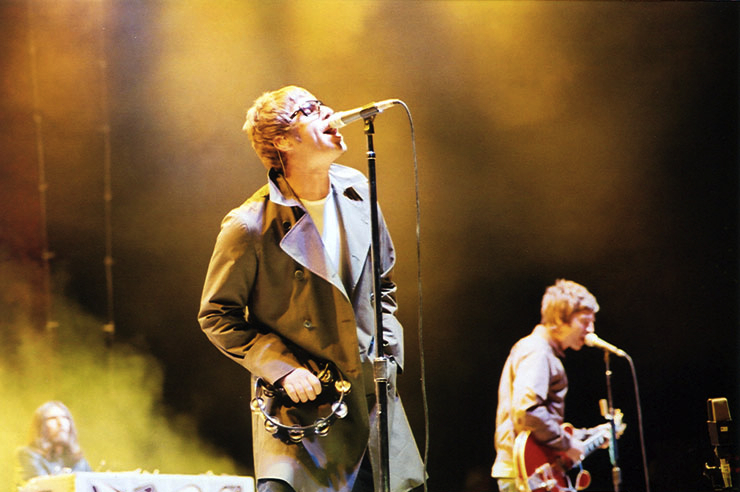
British band Oasis were one of four acts to reach number one on the UK Indie Chart with two different singles.

The UK Indie Chart is a weekly chart that ranks the biggest-selling singles that are released on independent record labels in the United Kingdom. The chart is compiled by the Official Charts Company, and is based on both physical and digital single sales. During 2008, 27 singles reached number one.

The biggest-selling indie hit of the year was "Dance Wiv Me" by Dizzee Rascal & Calvin Harris, which was at the top of the UK Indie Chart for nine weeks and sold nearly 390,000 copies. The second biggest-selling indie song was "Chasing Pavements" by Adele, which was at number one for five weeks and sold over 280,000 during the year.

Four acts were able to top the indie chart with two different singles. They were: The Futureheads with "The Beginning of the Twist" and "Radio Heart", Travis with "J. Smith" and "Something Anything", The Last Shadow Puppets with "The Age of the Understatement" and "My Mistakes Were Made for You", and Oasis with "The Shock of the Lightning" and "I'm Outta Time".

Chart-topping singles from the 2008 UK Indie Chart also included "Bluebirds Flying High", written by British singer James Fox as Cardiff City F.C.'s official song for the 2008 FA Cup Final, and a new remix of the Guru Josh song "Infinity", which topped the UK Indie Chart and made number three on the UK Singles Chart.

== Chart history ==
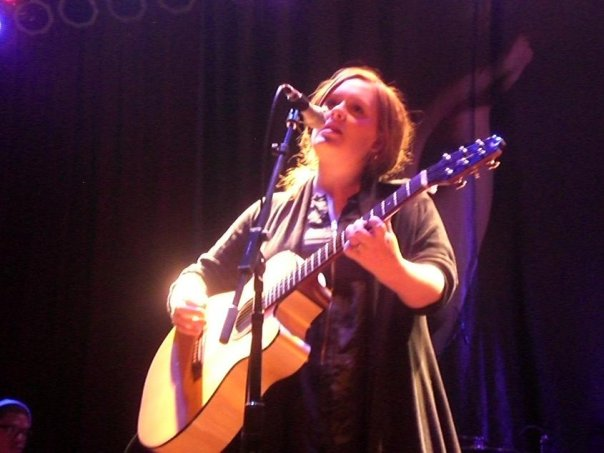
Singer Adele spent five weeks at number one with her debut single "Chasing Pavements".

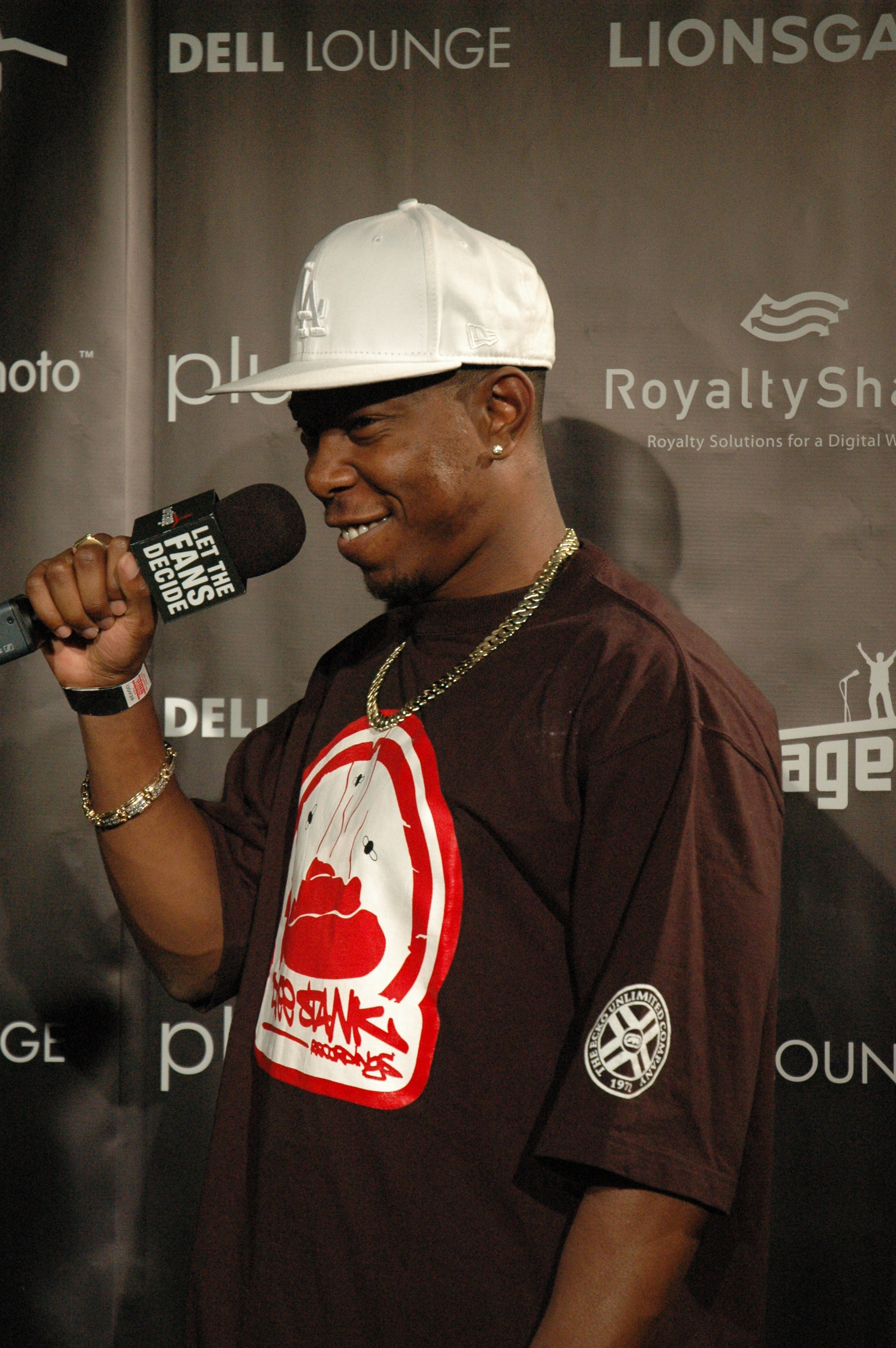
Rapper Dizzee Rascal had the biggest-selling indie hit of 2008, spending nine weeks at the top of the chart with "Dance Wiv Me".

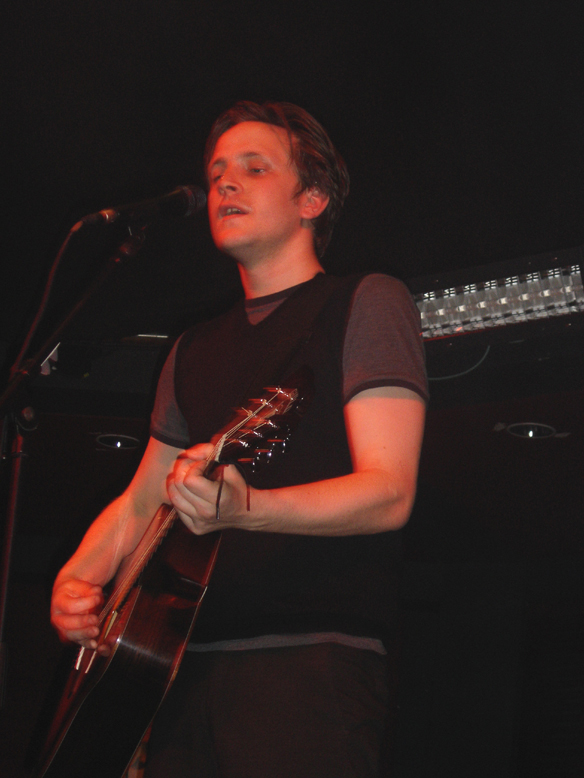
Barry Hyde topped the UK Indie Chart twice with his band The Futureheads.

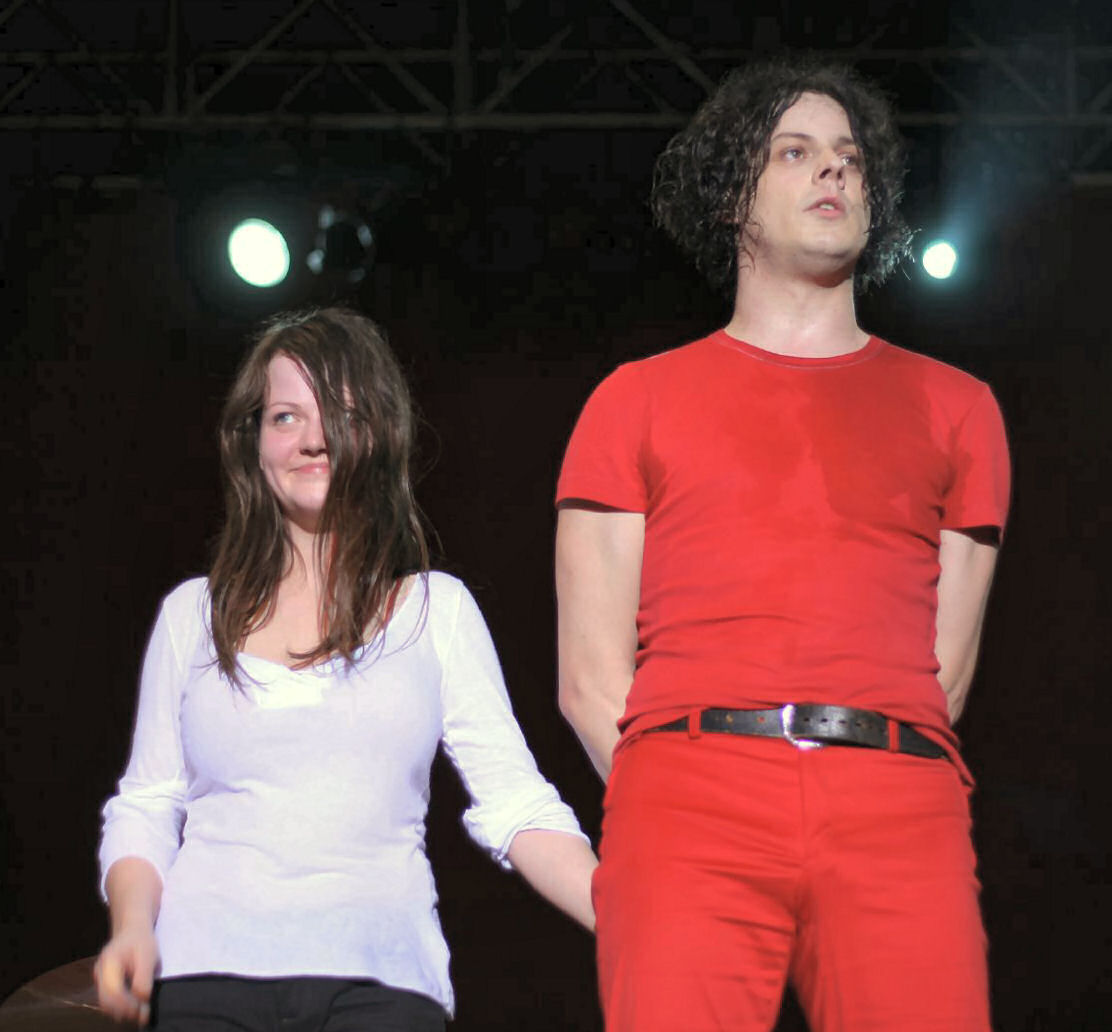
The White Stripes had the first indie number one of 2008, with their cover of the song "Conquest".

Key
†	Best-selling indie single of the year

Issue date	Song	Artist(s)	Record label	Ref.
6 January	"Conquest"	The White Stripes	XL	
13 January	"Waving Flags"	British Sea Power	Rough Trade	
20 January	"NW5"	Madness	Lucky 7	
27 January	"Chasing Pavements"	Adele	XL	
3 February	"Chasing Pavements"	Adele	XL	
10 February	"Chasing Pavements"	Adele	XL	
17 February	"Chasing Pavements"	Adele	XL	
24 February	"Chasing Pavements"	Adele	XL	
2 March	"Sunshine in the Rain"	BWO	Shell	
9 March	"Get What You Want"	Operator Please	Brille	
16 March	"The Beginning of the Twist"	The Futureheads	Nul	
23 March	"The Beginning of the Twist"	The Futureheads	Nul	
30 March	"Rock 'n' Roll Alamo – part 7"	This Is Seb Clarke	Sons	
6 April	"Nude"	Radiohead	XL	
13 April	"Nude"	Radiohead	XL	
20 April	"The Age of the Understatement"	The Last Shadow Puppets	Domino	
27 April	"The Age of the Understatement"	The Last Shadow Puppets	Domino	
4 May	"Look for the Woman"	Dan le Sac Vs. Scroobius Pip	Sunday Best	
11 May	"Bluebirds Flying High"	James Fox & Cardiff City F.C.	Plastic Tomato	
18 May	"This is an Emergency"	The Pigeon Detectives	Dance to the Radio	
25 May	"Radio Heart"	The Futureheads	Nul	
1 June	"This Is an Emergency"	The Pigeon Detectives	Dance to the Radio	
8 June	"This Is an Emergency"	The Pigeon Detectives	Dance to the Radio	
15 June	"We Are the People"	Feeder	Echo	
22 June	"Free Things for Poor People"	Infadels	Wall of Sound	
29 June	"Pink-A-Pade" / "Fairies"	Sukie	New Slang	
6 July	"J. Smith"	Travis	Red Telephone Box	
13 July	"Dance Wiv Me" †	Dizzee Rascal and Calvin Harris	Dirtee Stank	
20 July	"Dance Wiv Me" †	Dizzee Rascal and Calvin Harris	Dirtee Stank	
27 July	"Dance Wiv Me" †	Dizzee Rascal and Calvin Harris	Dirtee Stank	
3 August	"Dance Wiv Me" †	Dizzee Rascal and Calvin Harris	Dirtee Stank	
10 August	"Dance Wiv Me" †	Dizzee Rascal and Calvin Harris	Dirtee Stank	
17 August	"Dance Wiv Me" †	Dizzee Rascal and Calvin Harris	Dirtee Stank	
24 August	"Dance Wiv Me" †	Dizzee Rascal and Calvin Harris	Dirtee Stank	
31 August	"Dance Wiv Me" †	Dizzee Rascal and Calvin Harris	Dirtee Stank	
7 September	"Dance Wiv Me" †	Dizzee Rascal and Calvin Harris	Dirtee Stank	
14 September	Batcat	Mogwai	Play It Again Sam/Wall of Sound	
21 September	"Something Anything"	Travis	Red Telephone Box	
28 September	"Runaway"	Ladytron	Nettwerk	
5 October	"The Shock of the Lightning"	Oasis	Big Brother	
12 October	"The Shock of the Lightning"	Oasis	Big Brother	
19 October	"Paper Planes"	M.I.A.	XL	
26 October	"My Mistakes Were Made for You"	The Last Shadow Puppets	Domino	
2 November	"My Mistakes Were Made for You"	The Last Shadow Puppets	Domino	
9 November	"Infinity 2008"	Guru Josh Project	Ministry of Sound	
16 November	"Infinity 2008"	Guru Josh Project	Ministry of Sound	
23 November	"Infinity 2008"	Guru Josh Project	Ministry of Sound	
30 November	"Infinity 2008"	Guru Josh Project	Ministry of Sound	
7 December	"I'm Outta Time"	Oasis	Big Brother	
14 December	"I'm Outta Time"	Oasis	Big Brother	
21 December	"I'm Outta Time"	Oasis	Big Brother	
28 December	"I'm Outta Time"	Oasis	Big Brother	

== See also ==
- List of UK Dance Chart number-one singles of 2008
- List of UK Official Download Chart number-one singles of 2008
- List of UK Rock Chart number-one singles of 2008
- List of UK Singles Chart number ones of 2008
