= Rant (The Futureheads album) =

Studio album by The Futureheads
- Released: 2 April 2012
- Recorded: 2011
- Studio: First Avenue
- Genre: A cappella
- Length: 32:21
- Label: Nul
- Producer: Dave Curle

The Futureheads chronology
The Chaos (2010)	Rant (2012)	Powers (2019)

Singles from Rant
- 1. "Acapella" Released: 2011; 2. "Meet Me Halfway" Released: March 2012; 3. "The No. 1 Song in Heaven" Released: April 2012; 4. "Beeswing" Released: 18 June 2012

Rant is the fifth studio album by Sunderland-based indie rock band The Futureheads. It was released on 2 April 2012 in the United Kingdom, on the band's Nul Records. Unlike their four previous records, the disc was recorded entirely a cappella and features near to no instrumentation apart from vocals.

The release of the album was accompanied by an acoustic and a cappella UK tour, during which they notably opened for the Red Hot Chili Peppers. The band went on a break following this tour, before reuniting in 2018, and releasing an album in 2019, Powers.

The band's cover of Sparks' "The No. 1 Song in Heaven", released in April 2012 as a single, peaked at number 55 on the UK Physical Singles Chart.

== Background ==
The Futureheads appeared on Jo Whiley's Live Lounge on BBC Radio 1, on 17 April 2010, where they played a four-part harmony version of Kelis' "Acapella" song. They had arranged this cover in about 30 minutes, before debuting it live on the radio, with great success. The band later described this experience as "the most exciting thing" they'd ever done. Guitarist and vocalist Ross Millard was the first to propose the idea of recording such an album, and the Live Lounge performance acted as "the seed of the catalyst" for the project.

In September 2011, the band contributed an a cappella cover of "Robot", a song taken from their debut self-titled album, to the NExEA charity compilation for the Disaster Emergency Committee’s East Africa Crisis Appeal. It was later revealed that this track was part of their upcoming Rant album.

On 15 February 2012, the album was officially announced on the band's official website, and revealed to be "an album with no instrumentation, just the four of [them], in the studio, arranging songs for the human voice". The tracklist was also revealed, consisting of reinterpretations of past Futureheads tracks (such as earlier-revealed "Robot"), covers of pop songs (including Kelis' "Acapella") and folk classics. The announcement also detailed the reasons behind the making of this album:

"When you've played guitars, drums, keyboards, whatever for many years, you find that your hands start to want to automatically play familiar notes, familiar chords, familiar melodies every time you pick up the instrument. With your voice, that simply doesn't happen. It's a fresh start every time. The sky's the limit and it has been since birth. With this in mind, the a cappella record has us making noise like never before, and hopefully you'll hear The Futureheads in a new way, too. We're not turning our back on the 'Rock' forever, we just want you to hear us like this, because four-part harmony has been so important in the music we've made since day 1."

Commenting on track choices, bandleader Barry Hyde explained to NME that the cover of the Black Eyed Peas' "Meet Me Halfway" was made at his request. He explained finding the track "amazing, melodically speaking", and liking the idea of covering a song previously sung by women. The other Futureheads members were at first unsure of this choice, but after reworking its basic elements and removing the rap section that was "a step too far", the track made its way to the record.

== Recording and musical style ==
The Futureheads have previously been renowned for their work with vocal harmonies, which they started working on because of technical issues. Hyde explained in July 2011: "It was because the PA wasn't loud enough. I'd be stood around singing and I remember thinking, 'Why is it just me singing?' So the others all started to join in," citing the Beach Boys as an inspiration. He also referred to The Flying Pickets, an a cappella vocal group active in the 1980s, although "a bit asexual" sounding, while the band aimed for a rougher sound.

Hyde valued the "unique position" that being able to produce such an album put them in. Commenting on the departure from the band's previous style, he said:

"A Futureheads fan who doesn't get 'Rant' is not a Futureheads fan. This version of The Futureheads has always been there. We're bringing to the fore what we're really about: a unification, a gang mentality, which is in the balance between our voices and our personalities. Just because this is an a cappella album doesn't mean to say that the songs are slow or passive. They're still in-your-face, slightly mad, aggressive. They're still The Futureheads."

Recording sessions took place at First Avenue in Heaton, Newcastle with recording engineer Dave Curle throughout 2011, with each song on the album taking over 100 takes. The band told it was "a nightmare" to make all of them be in tune and work together and they would leave the studio "in a state of ultimate exhaustion" after recording each day.

== Touring ==
Following the release of the album, the band went on a full a cappella and acoustic UK tour. This tour took them to their hometown's Stadium of Light on 24 June 2012, where they opened for the Red Hot Chili Peppers on their I'm with You World Tour.

They were nominated in the "Best Event Durham" category of The Journal Culture Awards for their September 2012 concert in the Durham Cathedral. They lost to A Sign in Space, which took place during the BRASS: Durham International Festival, but played at the event which was held on 22 April 2013.

== Critical reception ==
Professional ratings
Aggregate scores
Source	Rating
Metacritic	74/100
Review scores
Source	Rating
Digital Spy	3/5 stars
Drowned in Sound	7/10
The Independent	3/5 stars
musicOMH	4/5 stars
NME	8/10
This Is Fake DIY	6/10

At Metacritic, which assigns a normalised rating out of 100 to reviews from mainstream publications, the album received an average score of 74, based on 13 reviews. Mayer Nissim of Digital Spy referred to this release as a "natural step" for the band, saluting the decision to mix reworkings of their songs with pop covers and traditional songs. According to him, the record would have fared better "as a shorter mini-album or EP", but salutes the fact the band tried "something different", "really chucking themselves into it". Danny Wright of This Is Fake DIY also recognized this album makes "perfect sense" for the band, and describes it as "a fun and genuinely touching set of songs". Andy Gill of The Independent particularly praised the band's cover of "Meet Me Halfway", turning the Black Eyed Peas song into "something new and entirely original".

Robert Cooke of Drowned in Sound commented that this "isn't the sort of album you're going to listen to every day". However, he wrote that this is "a timely reminder of what it was that set The Futureheads apart from their peers back in 2004 – they are true innovators, completely distinctive, occasionally mad, but still pretty damn marvellous." Laura Snapes of NME noted that even though this is not "the record that's going to restore The Futureheads to their former stature", it is "glorious indeed". Fraser McAlpine of BBC called Rant a "stunt album", but an "exhilarating" one, and one "that more than whets the appetite for whatever it is they choose to do next."

Jill Greenaway from the Reading Museum qualified the cover of "Sumer Is Icumen In" as "enormous fun", and praised the idea of a having a post-punk band covering what is believed to be the oldest written in the English language.

=== Accolades ===
Rant was nominated for the Artrocker Album of the Year Awards in 2012, but lost the award to Django Django's eponymous album.

== Track listing ==
All tracks are written by the Futureheads, except where otherwise indicated.

Rant track listing
No.	Title	Length
1.	"Meantime"	3:16
2.	"Meet Me Halfway" (Black Eyed Peas cover) (William Adams/Jean Baptiste/Stacy Ferguson/Jaime Gomez/Sylvia Gordon/Keith Harris/Allan Lindo)	3:04
3.	"Robot"	2:00
4.	"Beeswing" (Richard Thompson cover) (Richard Thompson)	4:15
5.	"Thursday"	4:11
6.	"Sumer Is Icumen In" (traditional)	1:51
7.	"The Keeper" (traditional)	1:40
8.	"The No. 1 Song in Heaven" (Sparks cover) (Ron Mael/Russell Mael/Giorgio Moroder)	4:25
9.	"The Old Dun Cow" (traditional)	2:52
10.	"Acapella" (Kelis cover) (Kelis Rogers/David Guetta/Fred Riesterer/Jean Baptiste/Makeba Riddick)	2:27
11.	"Man Ray" (includes the track "Hanging Johnny")	2:20
Total length:		32:21

=== Bonus tracks ===
12. "Heartbeat Song" – 1:48

== Personnel ==
=== The Futureheads ===
- Ross Millard – vocals
- Dave Hyde – vocals
- Barry Hyde – vocals
- David "Jaff" Craig – vocals

=== Technical personnel ===
- Dave Curle – producer, recording engineer
- Stuart Hardie – artwork

== Charts ==
Chart performance for Rant
Chart (2012)	Peak position
UK Albums (OCC)	125
