= Skip to the End =

Single by The Futureheads

from the album News and Tributes
- Released: 22 May 2006 (UK)
- Recorded: 2005
- Genre: Indie rock
- Length: 2:54
- Label: 679 Recordings
- Songwriter(s): David "Jaff" Craig, Barry Hyde, Dave Hyde, Ross Millard

The Futureheads singles chronology
"Area" (2005)	"Skip to the End" (2006)	"Worry About It Later" (2006)

News and Tributes track listing
- 1. "Yes/No"; 2. "Cope"; 3. "Fallout"; 4. "Skip to the End"; 5. "Burnt"; 6. "News and Tributes"; 7. "The Return of the Berserker"; 8. "Back to the Sea"; 9. "Worry About It Later"; 10. "Favours for Favours"; 11. "Thursday"; 12. "Face"; 13. "Area"; 14. "Help Us Out"; 15. "We Cannot Lose"; 16. "Decent Days and Nights (Shy Child remix)"

"Skip to the End" is the first single from The Futureheads's second album News and Tributes. It was released on 22 May 2006 in the United Kingdom. It was voted as the top video in the week commencing 1 May 2006 in the NME Video Chart featured on MTV2.

Four versions of the single have been released, three of which are 7" vinyl records. Each of these versions contain a unique B-side. The single charted at #24 in the UK Singles Chart.

== Track listing ==
- CD
1. "Skip to the End"
2. "Easy For Us"
- 7" #1
1. "Skip to the End"
2. "History Itself"
- 7" #2
1. "Skip to the End"
2. "Last Time Ever"
- 7" Picture Disc
1. "Skip to the End"
2. "History Itself"
