= Sumer is icumen in =

Medieval English canon

- Canon
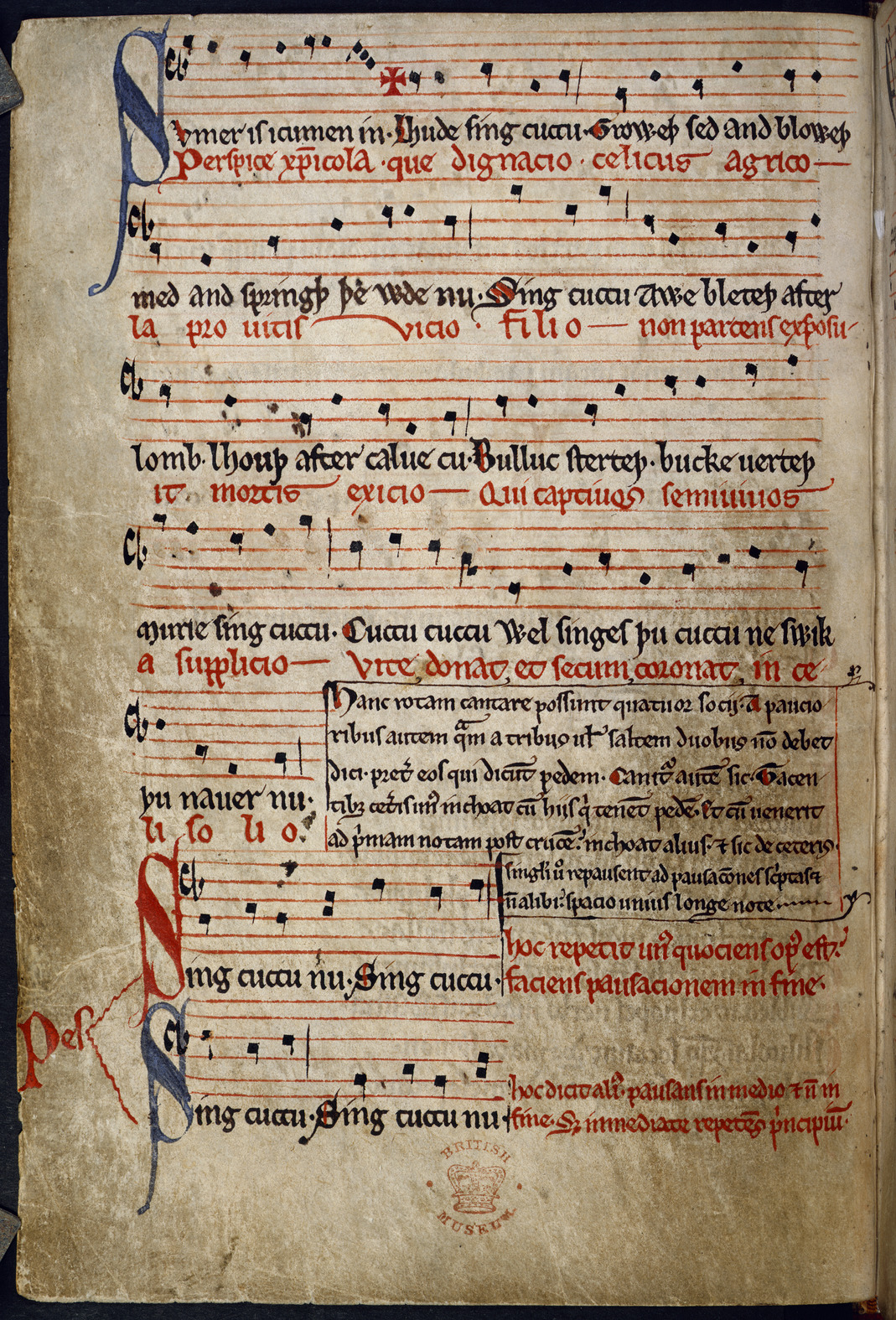
- Harley MS 978, folio 11v, British Library
- Language: Wessex dialect of Middle English

"Sumer is icumen in" is the incipit of a medieval English round or rota of the mid-13th century; it is also known variously as the Summer Canon and the Cuckoo Song. The line translates approximately to "Summer has come" or "Summer has arrived". The song is written in the Wessex dialect of Middle English. Although the composer's identity is unknown today, it may have been W. de Wycombe or a monk at Reading Abbey, John of Fornsete. The manuscript in which it is preserved was copied between 1261 and 1264.

This rota is the oldest known musical composition featuring six-part polyphony. It is sometimes called the Reading Rota because the earliest known copy of the composition, a manuscript written in mensural notation, was found at Reading Abbey; it was probably not drafted there, however. The British Library now retains this manuscript. A copy of the manuscript in stone relief is displayed on the wall of the ruined chapter house of Reading Abbey.

== Rota ==
A rota (Latin for 'wheel') is a type of round, which in turn is a kind of part song. To perform the round, one singer begins the song, and a second starts singing the beginning again just as the first gets to the point marked with the red cross in the first figure below. The length between the start and the cross corresponds to the modern notion of a bar, and the main verse comprises six phrases spread over twelve such bars. In addition, there are two lines marked "pes" (Latin for 'foot'), two bars each, that are meant to be sung together repeatedly underneath the main verse. These instructions are included (in Latin) in the manuscript itself:

Latin instructions	English translation
Hanc rotam cantare possunt quatuor socii. A paucioribus autem quam a tribus uel saltem duobus non debet dici preter eos qui dicunt pedem. Canitur autem sic. Tacentibus ceteris unus inchoat cum hiis qui tenent pedem. Et cum uenerit ad primam notam post crucem, inchoat alius, et sic de ceteris. Singuli de uero repausent ad pausaciones scriptas et non alibi, spacio unius longe note. Pes 1: hoc repetit unus quociens opus est faciens pausacionem in fine. Pes 2: hoc dicit alius pausans in medio et non in fine inmediate repetens principium.	Four companions can sing this round. But it should not be sung by fewer than three, or at the very least, two in addition to those who sing the 'foot'. This is how it is sung. While all the others are silent, one person begins at the same time as those who hold the 'foot'. And when he comes to the first note after the cross [which marks the end of the first bar], another singer is to begin, and thus for the others. Each shall observe the written rests for the space of one long note [triplet], but not elsewhere. Foot 1: this is repeated by one person as many times as necessary, pausing at the end. Foot 2: this is sung by another person with a pause in the middle, but not at the end, repeating the beginning straight away.

First line of the manuscript

"Sumer is icumen in" in modern notation:

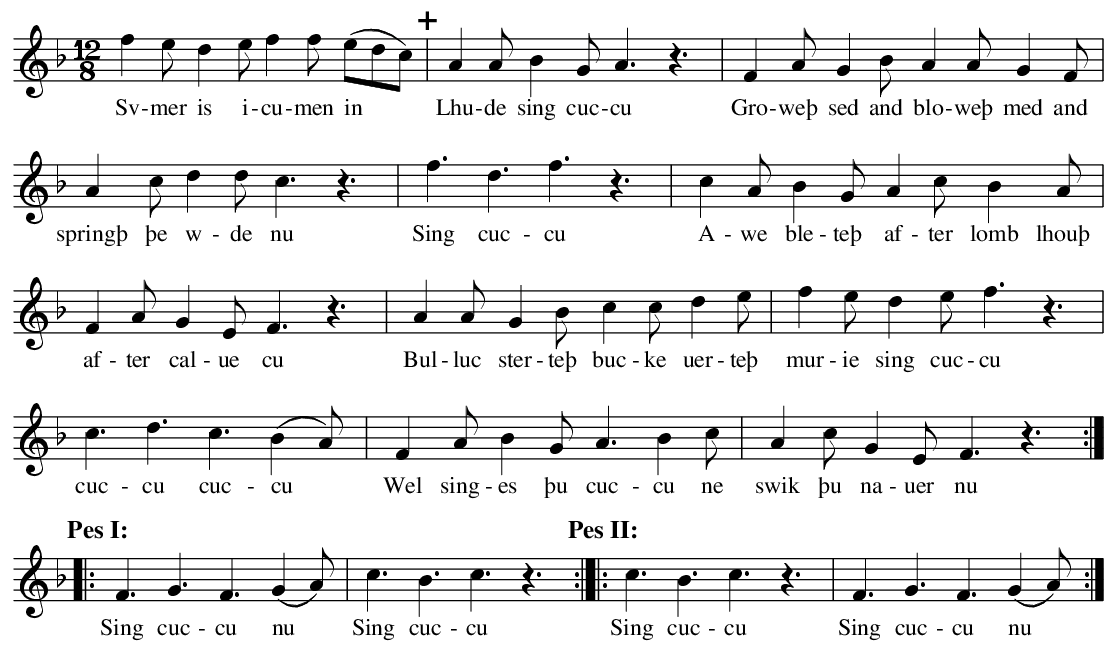
The song in modern staff notation

Melody only

As six-voice round (four in melody, two in "pes"

13th century English round

== Lyrics ==
Middle English
Sumer is icumen in
Lhude sing cuccu
Groweþ sed
and bloweþ med
and springþ þe wde nu
Sing cuccu

Awe bleteþ after lomb
lhouþ after calue cu
Bulluc sterteþ
bucke uerteþ
murie sing cuccu

Cuccu cuccu
Wel singes þu cuccu
ne swik þu nauer nu

Sing cuccu nu • Sing cuccu.
Sing cuccu • Sing cuccu nu

Translation:

Modern English
Summer (Note: While Middle English sumer is the source of Modern English "summer", Crystal (2004, 108) states it means "spring". Millett notes that the medieval sumer "extends over a longer period than the modern one".) has arrived,
Loudly sing, cuckoo!
The seed is growing
And the meadow is blooming,
And the wood is coming into leaf now,
Sing, cuckoo!

The ewe is bleating after her lamb,
The cow is lowing after her calf;
The bullock is prancing,
The billy-goat farting, [or "The stag cavorting"]
Sing merrily, cuckoo!

Cuckoo, cuckoo,
You sing well, cuckoo,
Never stop now.

Sing, cuckoo, now; sing, cuckoo;
Sing, cuckoo; sing, cuckoo, now!

The celebration of summer in "Sumer is icumen in" is similar to that of spring in the French poetic genre known as the reverdie (lit. "re-greening"). However, there are reasons to doubt such an interpretation. The language used lacks all of the conventional springtime-renewal words of a reverdie (such as "green", "new", "begin", or "wax") except for springþ, and elements of the text, especially the cuckoo and the farmyard noises, potentially possess double meanings. Roscow argues that it is "the wrong bird, the wrong season, and the wrong language for a reverdie, unless an ironic meaning is intended".

=== "Bucke Uerteþ" ===
The translation of "bucke uerteþ" is uncertain. Some (such as Millett 2003d, in the version given above) translate the former word as "buck-goat" and the latter as "passes wind" (with reconstructed OE spelling feortan). Platzer, on the other hand, views the latter, more vulgar, gloss as informed by "prejudices against mediæval culture" and suspects that those preferring it "may have had an axe to grind".

Erickson derided "linguistic Galahads" for promoting more decent translations, suggesting:

Editorial prudishness has kept that fine little Middle English poem, the Cuckoo Song, out of many a school-book, all because the old poet was familiar with English barn-yards and meadows and in his poem recalled those sights and sounds. He knew that bullocks and bucks feel so good in the springtime that they can hardly contain themselves, and he set down what he saw and heard, leaving it to squeamish editors to distort one of his innocent folk-words into a meaning that he would not recognise. One suspects that scholarly ingenuity has been overworked [...] to save the children of England from indecency.

Similarly, Arthur K. Moore states:

The older anthologists sometimes made ludicrous attempts to gloss 'buck uerteth' in a way tolerable to Victorian sensibilities. Most recent editors have recognized what every farm boy knows—that quadrupeds disport themselves in the spring precisely as the poet has said. To the fourteenth century, the idea was probably inoffensive.

According to Platzer, "this traditional reading is not as secure as the number of editors that have championed it might imply". The evolution of verteþ could not have originated in the unattested Old English feortan, in part because there is a gap of between 100 and 120 years between the first unambiguous usage of that word and its postulated use in Sumer is icumen in. Given that the poem was likely composed in Reading, with Leominster as a second possibility, a quantitative analysis was performed using the Linguistic Atlas of Late Mediæval English; out of nine lexemes originally beginning with the letter F, six demonstrably retained that letter in Reading (the other three were unattested), while four retained it in Leominster (four unattested, with fetch evolving into vetch). The Middle English Dictionary records a personal name Walterus Fartere from the calendar of the close rolls of 1234, and another name Johannes le Fartere from the Leicestershire lay subsidy rolls of 1327. This also implies the existence of a word farten or ferten in Middle English, both with an initial letter F.

=== Christian version in Latin ===
Beneath the Middle English lyrics in the manuscript, there is also a set of Latin lyrics which consider the sacrifice of the Crucifixion of Jesus:

Perspice Christicola^{†}
que dignacio
Celicus agricola
pro vitis vicio
Filio non parcens
exposuit mortis exicio
Qui captivos semivivos a supplicio
Vite donat et secum coronat
in celi solio

Translation:

Observe, Christian,
such honour!
The heavenly farmer,
owing to a defect in the vine,
not sparing the Son,
exposed him to the destruction of death.
To the captives half-dead from torment,
He gives them life and crowns them with himself
on the throne of heaven.

^{†}written "χρ̅icola" in the manuscript (see Christogram).

== Renditions and recordings ==
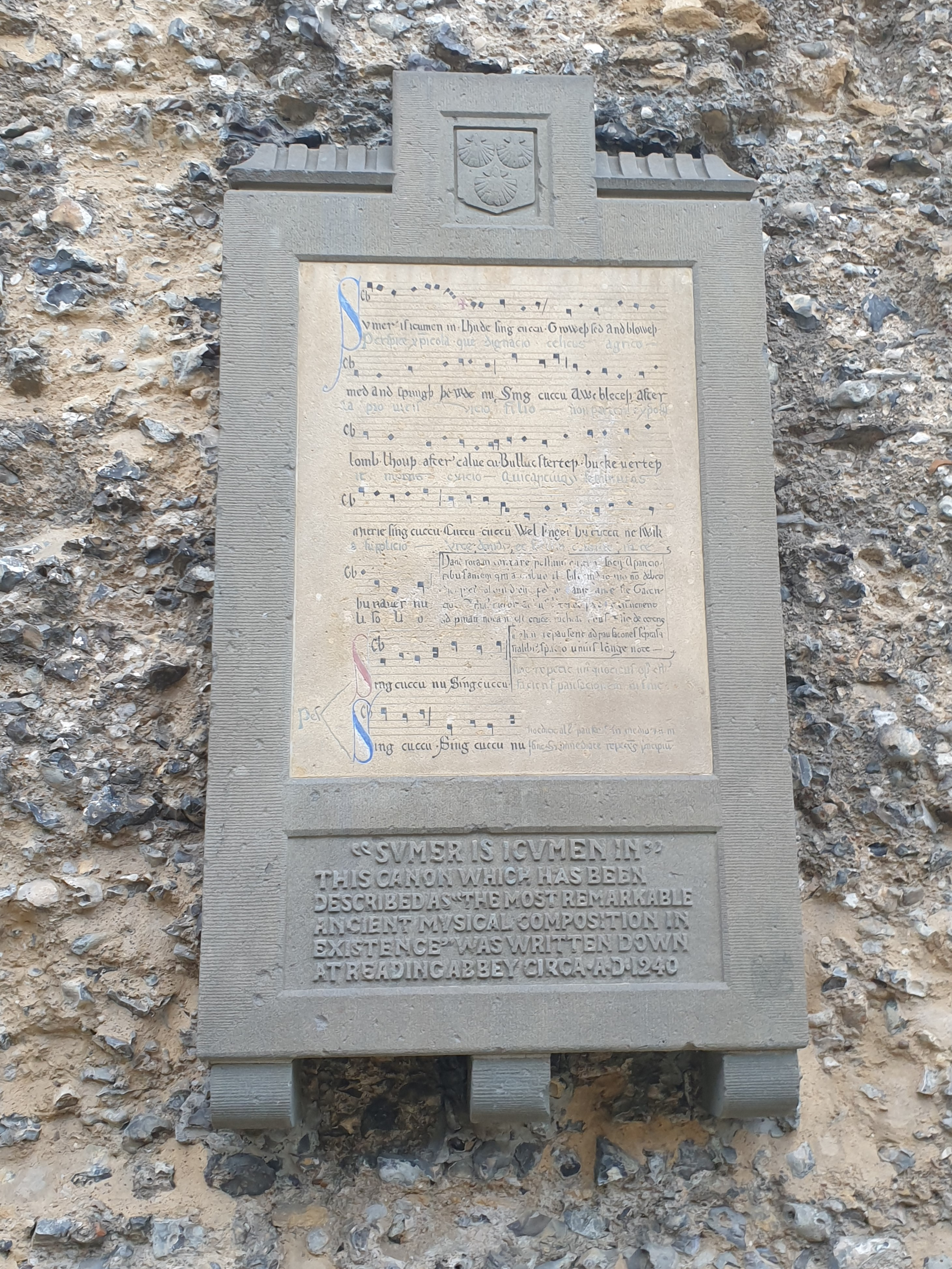
The original manuscript is represented by this stone relief on the wall of the ruined chapter house of Reading Abbey.

- A boys' choir sings the rota at the climax of Benjamin Britten's Spring Symphony (Opus 44, first performed 1949).
- The opening ceremony of the 1972 Summer Olympics in Munich included a performance of this rota. Children danced to the music around the track of the stadium.

=== Studio albums ===
- The English Singers made the first studio recording in New York, c. 1927, released on a 10-inch 78 rpm disc, Roycroft Living Tone Record No.159, in early 1928.
- A second recording, made by the Winchester Music Club, followed in 1929. Released on Columbia (England) D40119 (matrix number WAX4245-2), this twelve-inch 78 rpm record was made to illustrate the second in a series of five lectures by Sir George Dyson, for the International Educational Society, and is titled Lecture 61. The Progress Of Music. No. 1 Rota (Canon): Summer Is A Coming In (Part 4).)
- For similar purposes, E. H. Fellowes conducted the St. George's Singers in a recording issued c. 1930 on Columbia (US) 5715, a ten-inch 78 rpm disc, part of the eight-disc album M-221, the Columbia History of Music by Ear and Eye, Volume One, Period 1: To the Opening of the Seventeenth Century.
- The London Madrigal Group, conducted by T.B. Lawrence, recorded the work on 10 January 1936. This recording was issued later that year on Victrola 4316 (matrix numbers OEA2911 and OEA2913), a ten-inch 78 rpm disc.
- Cardiacs side project Mr and Mrs Smith and Mr Drake recorded the song to a new melody on their self-titled album in 1984.
- Richard Thompson's own arrangement is the earliest song on his album 1000 Years of Popular Music (2003 Beeswing Records). (Note: "1000 Years of Popular Music kicks off with 'Summer is icumen in', which is the original summer anthem and could be heard blasting from many a tavern and castle during the balmy middle months of 1260.")
- Emilia Dalby and the Sarum Voices covered the song for the album Emilia (2009 Signum Classics).
- Post-punk band The Futureheads perform the song a cappella for their album Rant (2012 Nul Records).
- The Hilliard Ensemble's album Sumer is icumen in (2002 Harmonia Mundi) opens with this song.
- Norwegian singer Charlotte Dos Santos released a version of the song on the album 'Cleo', in 2017.

=== Film ===
In the 1938 film The Adventures of Robin Hood, Little John (Alan Hale Sr.) whistles the melody of the song just before he first meets Robin Hood played by Errol Flynn. According to Lisa Colton, "Although it appears only this once, in that fleeting moment the tune serves to introduce the character through performance: the melody was presumably sufficiently recognisable to be representative of medieval English music, but perhaps, more importantly, the fact that Little John is whistling the song emphasizes his peasant status...In Robin Hood, Little John's performance of 'Sumer is icumen in' locates him socially as a contented, lower class male, a symbol of the romanticized ideal of the medieval peasant".

In the climax of the 1973 British film The Wicker Man, the villagers sing a mixed translation of the song written by Anthony Shaffer:

Sumer is Icumen in,
Loudly sing, cuckoo!
Grows the seed and blows the mead,
And springs the wood anew;
Sing, cuckoo!
Ewe bleats harshly after lamb,
Cows after calves make moo;
Bullock stamps and deer champs,
Now shrilly sing, cuckoo!
Cuckoo, cuckoo
Wild bird are you;
Be never still, cuckoo!

In the animated adaptation of The Flight of Dragons Sir Orin Neville-Smythe sings a disjointed rendition of the song while afflicted by the Sandmirks.

=== Television ===
In the children's television programme Bagpuss, the mice sing a song called "The Mouse Organ Song (We Will Fix It)", to a tune adapted from "Sumer is icumen in".

The children's television show Strange Hill High has the song being sung by the students in The Snide Piper.

=== Parodies ===
This piece was parodied under the title "Ancient Music" by the American poet Ezra Pound in 1916 for his collection Lustra, but not published in the first two editions; it was published in the 1917 first American edition. In The Loathsome Lambton Worm, the unproduced script treatment for a sequel of The Wicker Man, Pound's variant of the poem was used in the place of the original.

Winter is icumen in,
Lhude sing Goddamm,
Raineth drop and staineth slop,
And how the wind doth ramm!
Sing: Goddamm.
Skiddeth bus and sloppeth us,
An ague hath my ham.
Freezeth river, turneth liver,
Damm you; Sing: Goddamm.
Goddamm, Goddamm, 'tis why I am, Goddamm,
So 'gainst the winter's balm.
Sing goddamm, damm, sing goddamm,
Sing goddamm, sing goddamm, DAMM.

The song is also parodied by "P. D. Q. Bach" (Peter Schickele) as "Summer is a cumin seed" for the penultimate movement of his Grand Oratorio The Seasonings.

Carpe diem,
Sing, cuckoo sing,
Death is a-comin in,
Sing, cuckoo sing.
death is a-comin in.

Another parody is Plumber is icumen in by A. Y. Campbell:

Plumber is icumen in;
Bludie big tu-du.
Bloweth lampe, and showeth dampe,
And dripth the wud thru.
Bludie hel, boo-hoo!

Thaweth drain, and runneth bath;
Saw saweth, and scrueth scru;
Bull-kuk squirteth, leake spurteth;
Wurry springeth up anew,
Boo-hoo, boo-hoo.

Tom Pugh, Tom Pugh, well plumbes thu, Tom Pugh;
Better job I naver nu.
Therefore will I cease boo-hoo,
Woorie not, but cry pooh-pooh,
Murie sing pooh-pooh, pooh-pooh,
Pooh-pooh!

== Notes and references ==
Notes

Sources

- Albright, Daniel (2004). Modernism and Music: An Anthology of Sources. Chicago: University of Chicago Press. ISBN 978-0-226-01267-4.
- Anon. (n.d.). ""Sumer is icumen in": An Old English Folk Song – Sheet Music, Midi and Mp3". MFiles.
- The Hilliard Ensemble – Sumer is icumen in – Medieval English Songs at AllMusic
- Bitner, Walter (7 April 2020). "Off The Podium: Sumer Is Icumen In". ChoralNet.
- ""Sumer is icumen in", MS Harley 978, f. 11v". British Library.
- Brown, Allan (2010). Inside The Wicker Man: How Not to Make a Cult Classic. Birlinn. ISBN 978-1846971440.
- Colton, Lisa (2017). Angel song: Medieval English music in history. London: Routledge. p. 31. ISBN 9781472425683.
- The Cuckoo Song ("Sumer is icumen in"), 1972 Summer Olympic Games on YouTube
- Crystal, David (2004). Stories of English. New York: Overlook Press.
- Curtiz, Michael; Keighley, William (Directors) (1938). The Adventures of Robin Hood (Motion picture). Event occurs at 20:37–20:44.
- Deusner, Stephen M. (17 July 2006). "Richard Thompson 1,000 Years of Popular Music". Pitchfork.
- Ericson, E (1938). "Bullock Sterteþ, Bucke Verteþ". Modern Language Notes. 53 (2): 112–113. doi:10.2307/2912044. JSTOR 2912044.
- Fisher, Margaret (November 2014). "'Ancient Music' Ezra Pound's Parody of a Medieval Rota". Make It New. 1 (3). The Ezra Pound Society: 37–43. A paginated PDF is available at academia.edu..
- Hall, David (1948). The Record Book: A Guide to the World of the Phonograph. New York: Oliver Durrell.
- Haskell, Harry (1988). The Early Music Revival: A History. London: Thames & Hudson.
- Hilts, Carly (2018). "Review – Reading Abbey revealed". Current Archaeology.
- Hoffmann, Frank (2004). "Roycroft (Label)", Encyclopedia of Recorded Sound. New York: Routledge. ISBN 9781135949495.
- "Miri it is – "Sumer is icumen in"". Hyperion Records. n.d. Hyperion SIGCD141.
- Latham, Alison, ed. (2002). "Sumer is icumen in". The Oxford Companion to Music. Oxford University Press. ISBN 9780198662129 – via Internet Archive.
- Leslie, George Clark, supervising editor (1942). "Fornsete, John (c. 1226): 'Sumer is icumen in' (The Reading Rota)". The Gramophone Shop Encyclopedia of Recorded Music, new edition, completely revised. New York: Simon and Schuster.
- McAlpine, Fraser (2012). "The Futureheads Rant Review". British Broadcasting Corporation.
- Millett, Bella (2003a). "'Sumer is icumen in': London, British Library, MS Harley 978, f. 11v: Introduction". Wessex Parallel Web Texts website (Accessed 25 November 2014).
- Millett, Bella (2003b). "'Sumer is icumen in': London, British Library, MS Harley 978, f. 11v: Text". Wessex Parallel Web Texts website (Accessed 25 November 2014).
- Millett, Bella (2003c). "'Sumer is icumen in': London, British Library, MS Harley 978, f. 11v: Notes". Wessex Parallel Web Texts website (Accessed 25 November 2014).
- Millett, Bella (2003d). "'Sumer is icumen in': London, British Library, MS Harley 978, f. 11v: Translations". Wessex Parallel Web Texts website (Accessed 25 November 2014).
- Millett, Bella (2004). "'Sumer is icumen in': London, British Library, MS Harley 978, f. 11v: The Manuscript". Wessex Parallel Web Texts website (Accessed 25 November 2014).
- Minard, Jenny (2009). "'Sumer is icumen in' at Abbey Ruins". British Broadcasting Corporation.
- Moore, A. Keister (1951). The Secular Lyric in Middle English. Lexington: University of Kentucky Press.
- Platzer, Hans (1995). "On the disputed reading of 'uerteÞ' in the 'Cuckoo Song'". Neuphilologische Mitteilungen. 96 (2): 123–143. JSTOR 43346063. "In the following I propose to show that the traditional interpretation of uerteþ from OE feortan 'break wind' is not as secure as is generally assumed despite being endorsed by the relevant dictionaries and most editors. Alternatively, I support Hoepfner's (1944), Silverstein's (1971) and Kermode & Hollander's (1973) suggestion of a loan from Lat. vertere 'go to and fro, move about'. I shall back this up mainly by an item count establishing the frequency of Southern and West Midland ME voiced /v-/~ from historical initial /f-/ as well as by semantic / stylistic considerations."
- Rogers, Jude. 2010. "Papa's Got a Brand New Bagpuss: How Sandra Kerr's Folk Roots for the Fondly Remembered 1970s Children's TV Show Has Influenced Today's Performers". The Guardian (Thursday 29 July).
- Roscow, G. H. (1999). "What is 'Sumer is icumen in'?" Review of English Studies 50, no. 198:188–195.
- Siese, Ray (n.d.). "Dyson Trust Discography".
- Mr Spencer (2011). "Ex-Cardiacs Tunesmith William D. Drake Writes Songs That Are Timeless, Bold and Beautiful". Louder Than War.
- Spicer, Paul (n.d.). "Britten, Benjamin: Spring Symphony, Op. 44 (1949) 45' for soprano, alto and tenor soloists, chorus, boys' choir, and orchestra". Boosey & Hawkes.
- Taylor, Deems (1929). "Hear the English Singers", The World’s Work 58:p. 12
- Wulstan, David (April 2000). "'Sumer is icumen in': A Perpetual Puzzle-Canon?". Plainsong and Medieval Music. 9 (1): 1–17. doi:10.1017/S0961137100000012.
