= Walking Backwards =

Single by The Futureheads

from the album This Is Not the World
- Released: 10 March 2008 (UK)
- Genre: Indie rock
- Label: Nul Records
- Songwriters: David "Jaff" Craig, Barry Hyde, Dave Hyde, Ross Millard

The Futureheads singles chronology
"Radio Heart" (2008)	"Walking Backwards" (2008)	"I Wouldn't Be Like This If You Were Here" (2008)

This Is Not the World track listing
- 1. "The Beginning of the Twist"; 2. "Walking Backwards"; 3. "Think Tonight"; 4. "Radio Heart"; 5. "This Is Not the World"; 6. "Sale of the Century"; 7. "Hard to Bear"; 8. "Work Is Never Done"; 9. "Broke Up the Time"; 10. "Everything's Changing Today"; 11. "Sleet"; 12. "See What You Want"

"Walking Backwards" is the third single from The Futureheads' third studio album, This Is Not the World, which was released on 4 August 2008.

== Track listings ==
- 7" single
1. "Walking Backwards"
2. "This Is Not The World (Live @ Kings College)"
- Digital download
1. "Walking Backwards"
2. "This Is Not The World (Live @ Kings College)"
3. "Everything's Changing (Live @ Kings College)"
4. "Broke Up The Time (Live @ Kings College)"

== Music video ==
The single's music video was released 26 August 2008. The video features "puppet" versions of the band members performing the song.
