= Radio Heart =

Radio Heart may refer to:

- Radio Heart (The Futureheads song), 2008
- Radio Heart (Charly McClain song), 1985
- Radio Heart (band), a music project by Scottish brothers Hugh and David Nicholson
