= The Novellos =

- Origin: Stoke-on-Trent, North Staffordshire
- Genres: Indie, pop, punk
- Years active: 2007–present
- Label: Sons Ltd
- Members: Michael Greig Thomas; Adam Steele; Eddy Gillespie; Sam Walker
- Past members: Daniel Ellwood; Richard Dodd; Phil Gillespie
- Website: The Novellos Official

The Novellos are an English, four-piece indie rock group formed in Stoke on Trent taking large influences from 1960s music, soul and post punk. The group has earned a reputation for their frantic live performances and their sporadic single releases.

They first rose to prominence in March 2008 with their first single, "The Lady Is Not For Turning" written by Michael Greig Thomas, arranged and produced by founder of SONS Ltd, Seb Clarke of This Is Seb Clarke. The song cited the ever present echoes of Margaret Thatcher in their hometown of Stoke on Trent, and was nationally championed across BBC Radio 1, BBC Radio 2, BBC 6 Music and XFM.

== Formation and SONS Ltd ==
The original incarnation of The Novellos first met at Newcastle-under-Lyme School, the line-up saw Michael Greig Thomas on guitar and vocal duties, Adam Steele on bass, Richard Dodd on guitar and keys and Daniel Ellwood on Drums. The band practiced on weekends and at school, trying to find time between exams, revision and course work for their musical musings. In early 2007 the band performed their first gig in The Sugarmill, Hanley, Staffordshire - their performance earning them a warm reception and in turn catching the attention of Sebastian Clarke. After a number of meetings and conversations between Clarke and the band, as well as some convincing on the behalf of Michael Greig Thomas, The Novellos agreed to a one release deal with Clarke's label SONS Ltd. After moving their equipment into the SONS studio in Hanley, Stoke on Trent the band began work on their first release, "The Lady Is Not For Turning".

Ellwood was replaced by Eddy Gillespie from the Leek based band, Silent Call. The track "The Lady Is Not For Turning" has two drum takes on the mix, both Gillespie's and Ellwood's. The Novellos also parted company with Dodd, replacing them with Phil Gillespie. Sam Walker, also of Silent Call, joined to play Hammond organ and the trombone.

== The Gillespie brothers & SONS showcases ==
In 2008 the band undertook a live session on BBC Radio Stoke, to promote "The Lady Is Not For Turning", which reached No. 3 in the UK Indie Chart. Successive performances across the UK and at three Showcase events followed. During this time both the musical and professional partnership with Seb Clarke grew; Clarke's band - This Is Seb Clarke and The Novellos enjoyed chart success. The year culminated in a BBC Radio 1 session at Maida Vale Studios, backed by the support of Steve Lamacq on his In New Music We Trust show, and the extension of their contract with SONS Ltd.

Around this time, a split took place between Phil Gillespie and Thomas about the direction of the band's career. Stoke-on-Trent promoter Anthony Price, then owner of the Sugarmill venue, had secretly approached the band, asking them to leave SONS Ltd to sign to his promotions company, under the management of Sheffield based Karen Johnson. Phil Gillespie wanted to leave SONS Ltd, Thomas and Steele both vowed to stay. Phil Gillespie subsequently left The Novellos on 20 April, the day after their second Showcase. Walker and Eddy Gillespie remained in the ranks of the band. The following year saw the reformation of Phil Gillespie's band Silent Call, which included his brother Eddy Gillespie on drums and Sam Walker on keyboards, whilst both still remained in the Novellos.

== Writing and recording ==
Their second release, "Not So Sure", was intended for release in late 2009, although it was not issued until February 2010, reaching No. 12 in the UK Indie Chart. Their third single, "All You Need" was intended for release in April 2010, however the release was delayed. During this time the band where offered a Glastonbury Festival slot, but struggling to find the time to complete the recordings, SONS Ltd were forced to cancel the performance.

"All You Need" was released on 23 August 2010.

== Singles ==
Date of Release	Title	Label	UK Indie Chart
24 March 2008	"The Lady Is Not For Turning"	SONS Ltd	3
8 February 2010	"Not So Sure"	SONS Ltd	12
23 August 2010	"All You Need"	SONS Ltd	-
