= Worry About It Later =

Single by The Futureheads

from the album News and Tributes
- Released: 14 August 2006 (UK)
- Recorded: 2005
- Genre: Indie rock
- Length: 3:15 (single version); 4:14 (album version)
- Label: 679 Recordings
- Songwriter(s): David "Jaff" Craig, Barry Hyde, Dave Hyde, Ross Millard

The Futureheads singles chronology
| "Skip to the End" (2006) | "Worry About It Later" (2006) | "The Beginning of the Twist" (2008) |

"Worry About It Later" is the second single to be taken from The Futureheads second album News and Tributes. It performed poorly in the charts only reaching a chart position of #52 in the UK Singles Chart.

This was the last single released from the album because of the band's parting from record label 679.

== Track listing ==
- CD
1. "Worry About It Later"
2. "Skip to the End (Live At The Sage With "Field Music")"
- 7" #1
1. "Worry About It Later"
2. "Fallout (Switch Remix)"
- 7" #2
1. "Worry About It Later"
2. "Worry About It Later (Live At The Sage With "Field Music")"

== Charts ==
| Chart (2006) | Position |
|---|---|
| UK Singles (OCC) | 52 |
