= Hounds of Love (song) =

1986 single by Kate Bush

Single by Kate Bush

from the album Hounds of Love
- B-side: "The Handsome Cabin Boy"; "Jig of Life"; "Burning Bridge"; "My Lagan Love"
- Released: 17 February 1986
- Recorded: 1984
- Studio: Wickham Farm Home Studios (Welling, England); Windmill Lane Studios (Dublin, Ireland)
- Genre: Art pop; baroque pop; progressive pop; new wave
- Length: 3:02
- Label: EMI
- Songwriter: Kate Bush
- Producer: Kate Bush

Kate Bush singles chronology
"Cloudbusting" (1985)	"Hounds of Love" (1986)	"The Big Sky" (1986)

Music video
- "Hounds of Love" on YouTube

"Hounds of Love" is a song written, produced and performed by the English singer Kate Bush. It is the title track and the third single released from her fifth studio album Hounds of Love (1985). The single was released in the UK on 17 February 1986. The single peaked at No. 18 and spent 5 weeks in the UK singles chart.

It was performed live for the first time as part of the 2014 Before the Dawn residency.

== Overview ==
Bush wrote the title track at her house early on in the recording process for Hounds of Love. Lyrically, the song uses the imagery of an individual being chased by a pack of hounds as a metaphor for an aversion to love. The words heard at the beginning of the track were sampled from the British 1957 horror film Night of the Demon and spoken by Maurice Denham.

In October 2004, Q magazine placed this song at No. 21 in its list of the 50 greatest British songs of all time.

== Music video ==
A music video was made for the song, which Bush herself directed. It was inspired by Alfred Hitchcock's thriller film The 39 Steps (1935) and a Hitchcock lookalike also features in the video (a nod to the director's famous cameo appearances in his movies).

== Critical reception ==
Upon its release as a single, Roger Holland of Sounds picked "Hounds of Love" as the magazine's "single of the week" and wrote, "There's a blatantly sexual gasp caught somewhere in her throat as Kate Bush plays hide and go seek with the inevitable. There's something coming through those trees, but although she's scared, she's also wide-eyed with anticipation."

== Track listings ==
All songs written and composed by Kate Bush, except "The Handsome Cabin Boy", which is a traditional composition. "Alternative Hounds of Love" is not a remix, but an early version, with slightly different lyrics.

7-inch single (UK)
No.	Title	Length
1.	"Hounds of Love"	3:05
2.	"The Handsome Cabin Boy"	3:10

7-inch single (US)
No.	Title	Length
1.	"Hounds of Love"	3:01
2.	"Burning Bridge"	4:38

12-inch single (UK)
No.	Title	Length
1.	"Alternative Hounds of Love"	3:44
2.	"Jig of Life"	4:06
3.	"The Handsome Cabin Boy"	3:10

12-inch single (US)
No.	Title	Length
1.	"Alternative Hounds of Love"	3:44
2.	"Burning Bridge"	4:38
3.	"My Lagan Love"	2:31

== Personnel ==
- Kate Bush – vocals, Fairlight CMI, Yamaha CS-80
- Stuart Elliott – drums
- Charlie Morgan – drums
- Jonathan Williams – cello

== Charts ==
Chart (1986)	Peak position
Canadian Singles Chart	84
Europe (European Top 100 Singles)	63
German Singles Chart	68
Irish Singles Chart	12
Luxembourg (Radio Luxembourg)	14
UK Singles Chart	18

Chart (2022)	Peak position
UK Download Chart	71
UK Sales Chart	72

== Certifications ==
Region	Certification	Certified units/sales
United Kingdom (BPI)	Silver	200,000^{‡}
^{‡} Sales+streaming figures based on certification alone.

== The Futureheads version ==
"Hounds of Love"

Single by the Futureheads

from the album The Futureheads
- B-side: "Man Made (A Mistake)"; "Decent Days and Nights"
- Released: 21 February 2005
- Genre: Indie rock
- Length: 3:05
- Label: 679 Recordings
- Songwriter: Kate Bush
- Producer: Paul Epworth

The Futureheads singles chronology
"Meantime" (2004)	"Hounds of Love" (2005)	"Area" (2005)

Music video
- "Hounds of Love" on YouTube

"Hounds of Love" was covered by English post-punk band the Futureheads for their self-titled debut album and was released as a single in February 2005. The single peaked at No. 8 on the UK charts in its first week and was named Best Single of 2005 by NME. In October 2011, NME placed it at No. 89 on its list "150 Best Tracks of the Past 15 Years".

=== Music video ===
The music video for the Futureheads version was filmed at a public park in Los Angeles at night. Various dog breeds run around the band throughout the video. The video was finished by Sunrise.

=== Track listings ===
7-inch vinyl single
No.	Title	Writer(s)	Length
1.	"Hounds of Love"	Kate Bush	3:05
2.	"Man Made (A Mistake)"	The Futureheads	2:37

CD single #1
No.	Title	Writer(s)	Length
1.	"Hounds of Love"	Kate Bush	3:05
2.	"Hounds of Love" (Phones' Wolves at the Door remix)	Kate Bush	5:18

CD single #2
No.	Title	Writer(s)	Length
1.	"Hounds of Love"	Kate Bush	3:05
2.	"Decent Days and Nights" (acoustic)	The Futureheads	2:39
3.	"Hounds of Love" (Mystery Jets' Pirate Invasion mix)	Kate Bush	4:24
4.	"Man Made (A Mistake)"	The Futureheads	5:13
5.	"Hounds of Love" (music video (data track))	Kate Bush

=== Charts ===
==== Weekly charts ====
Chart (2005)	Peak position
Irish Singles Chart	26
UK Singles Chart	8

==== Year-end charts ====
Chart (2005)	Position
UK Singles (OCC)	200
