= Nul Book Standard =

EP by The Futureheads
- Released: 2002
- Studio: Abbey Road
- Genre: Post-punk revival
- Length: 6:05
- Label: Project Cosmonaut

The Futureheads chronology
Nul Book Standard (2002)	1-2-3-Nul! EP (2003)

Nul Book Standard is an EP by British band The Futureheads. Their first official release, the EP came out in 2002 on the Project Cosmonaut label. Tracks A2 and B2 are different recordings to those found on their debut album.

== Background ==
As the Futureheads were sending demo discs to record labels, Matt Wilkinson - who was working for Rough Trade Records at the time, and looking to set up a label of his own - got ahold of one of them. Wilkinson felt potential in the Sunderland quartet, even "started shaking it was that good" listening to the tape. He said about the band's music:

I really liked the fact that they do not pretend to be American or sing in American accents. The guys sing in their own dialects. They are not pretentious at all. They have post-punk elements which is popular now, stuff from the late 70s and 80s there's a resurgence in that.

Wilkinson created the Project Cosmonaut label with his friend Nick Ellson, and contacted guitarist and vocalist Ross Millard to sign them. He then arranged for their EP to be mixed at Abbey Road Studios and gaining airtime on British radios.

== Track listing ==
1. "Park Inn" - 1:11
2. "Robot" - 2:10
3. "My Rules" - 1:39
4. "Stupid and Shallow" - 1:35
