= SONS Records =

British independent record label

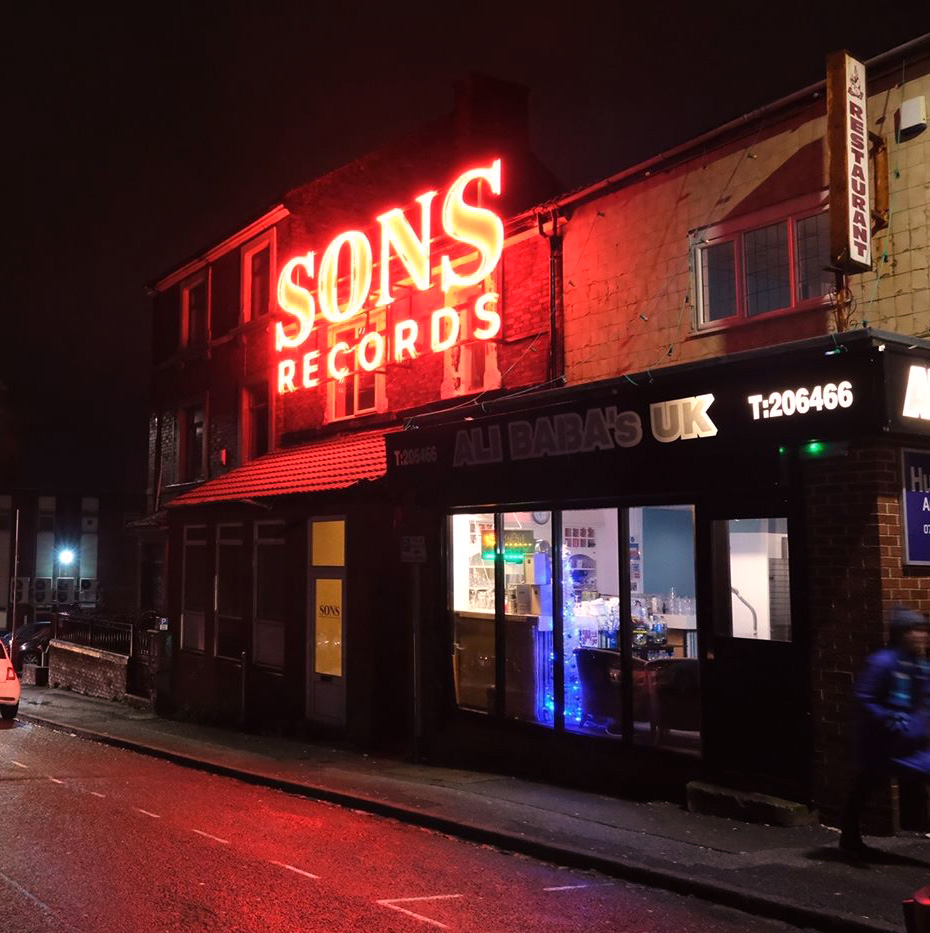
- The SONS in-house studio based in Hanley, Stoke-on-Trent
- Founded: 2004
- Founder: Seb Clarke, Neil Graham, Al Padmore, James Wakefield & Tangwyn Davies
- Genre: Indie, Punk, Soul
- Country of origin: United Kingdom
- Location: Stoke-on-Trent, North Staffordshire, England
- Official website: http://www.sonsrecords.uk

SONS Records is an independent record label based in Stoke-on-Trent, a trading name for SONS Records Ltd. The original company SONS Ltd was formed in 2004 by Seb Clarke, who was shortly after joined by: Neil Graham, Al Padmore, James Wakefield and Tangwyn Davies. The label consists largely of bands native to the north Staffordshire area and has become a noted figure both locally and nationally, having recently received attention from Chris Hawkins, Steve Lamacq, and Huw Stephens (6music, BBC Radio 1) as well as Mark Radcliffe and Stuart Maconie (BBC Radio 2) SONS has earned comparisons to Factory Records for its DIY ethic and its unique 'SONS sound'. In May 2020 following a decade long hiatus, SONS announced the launch of a series of tracks from their new roster of artists (some of which have yet to be released). The first of these tracks to receive national airplay while remaining entirely exclusive to the streaming platform Sonstream, was 'College Days Over' by Jayne Taylor. Chris Hawkins commented on his show that "this sounds like a great old tune, but it's brand new... Muscle-Shoals-on-Trent, great song and arrangement. Classic Americana with a twist of English melancholia."

== Associated bands ==
- This Is Seb Clarke
- The Novellos
- The Title
- Tommy Turbo & The Turbervilles
- La Dies
- The Rough Charm
- The Fortunas
- Friends of Ken
- Jane Taylor
- Marty Vaughn
- Neil Isaacs

All of the bands use the labels in-house basement studio situated in Hanley, Staffordshire. Consequently, The label has been noted for coining their own 'SONS Sound' due to their production practice. SONS exclusively record using analogue equipment, deliberately hearkening back to the production ethos of the 1960s; using tape machines, vintage valve amplifiers, and tube microphones for the distinctive warm, saturated character. The 'SONS Sound' has been likened to that of the Motown and Soul records of the 1960s and 1970s.

== SONS Showcase ==
The label regularly hosts large showcase events in the centre of Stoke-on-Trent. These events feature all of the bands on the SONS roster as well as DJs such as Steve Lamacq, Chris Hawkins, and Jon Kennedy. These showcase nights have become a regular marker in the Stoke Music calendar and a centrepiece for the burgeoning scene. The showcases have earned an infamous insignia both in the local and national radar thanks to the late night antics of the audience, band members, special guests and the NME coverage of the events.

The first SONS Showcase took place at the King's Hall and featured DJ slots from Andy Rourke of The Smiths, Huw Stephens, Russ Winstanley the Northern Soul Legend. Since then there have been a further three showcase nights which have taken place at the Victoria Hall in Hanley. These have been hosted by, amongst others: Carl Barât, Alexa Chung, Colin Murray and Phill Jupitus. The showcase was the label's most successful to date.

== Chart success ==
SONS' first chart success came with the simultaneous release of three singles in January 2007 by This Is Seb Clarke, Friends of Ken and The Title. These singles charted respectively at 7, 9 and 15 in the UK Independent Chart and received national airplay across 6Music and BBC Radio 1.

In March 2008, the label once again released four singles simultaneously, all of which entered into the top 5 of the UK Independent Chart in their first week of release: This Is Seb Clarke, the label's longest serving signees marked the label's highest chart position to date, knocking The Futureheads off the number 1 spot. However, due to the label's financial constraints, only 1000 copies of each single were pressed, leading to all singles dropping out of the top 40 a week later due to lack of physical stock.

== Full release details ==
- SONSTISC000001 This Is Seb Clarke – Rover
- SONSTISC0002 This Is Seb Clarke – Spring Morning Sunshine]
- SONSTITL0003 The Title – Slippin' and Slidin'
- SONSTISC0004 This Is Seb Clarke – I Just Can't Carry On
- SONSFROK0005 Friends of Ken – Backwards
- SONSTITL0006 The Title – Madman
- SONSNOVS0001 The Novellos – The Lady is Not for Turning
- SONSRAPH0001 Raphaels – Charming Man
- SONSTISC0005 This Is Seb Clarke – Rock n' Roll Alamo Part 7
- SONSNOVS0002 The Novellos – Not So Sure
- SONSTISC0011 This Is Seb Clarke – Saturday Night, Sunday Morning
- SONSTTTT0012 Tommy Turbo & The Turbervilles – (Her Name Is) Sophie

== See also ==
- Lists of record labels
