= Heartbeat Song (The Futureheads song) =

Single by The Futureheads

from the album The Chaos
- Released: 12 April 2010
- Recorded: 2009
- Genre: Indie rock
- Length: 2:28
- Label: Nul Records
- Songwriters: David "Jaff" Craig, Barry Hyde, Dave Hyde, Ross Millard

The Futureheads singles chronology
| "I Wouldn't Be Like This If You Were Here" (2009) | "Heartbeat Song" (2010) | "I Can Do That" (2010) |

"Heartbeat Song" is the first single to be taken from the fourth album from The Futureheads, The Chaos. It was released in the United Kingdom on 12 April 2010 and has so far managed to reach a peak of #34 on the UK Singles Chart. The single peaked on BBC Radio 1's A-list playlist during March 2010.

A limited edition signed and hand-stamped 7" vinyl single was released later that same week for UK Record Store Day. It was limited to 500 copies.

== Formats and track listings ==
Digital Download

| No. | Title | Length |
|---|---|---|
| 1. | "Heartbeat Song" | 2:28 |
| 2. | "Heartbeat Song (BlackNoise Remix)" | 4:56 |

iTunes Digital Download

| No. | Title | Length |
|---|---|---|
| 1. | "Heartbeat Song" | 2:28 |
| 2. | "Heartbeat Song (BlackNoise Remix)" | 4:56 |
| 3. | "Heartbeat Song (Randomer Remix)" | 4:39 |

Limited Edition 7" Vinyl

| No. | Title | Length |
|---|---|---|
| 1. | "Heartbeat Song" | 2:28 |
| 2. | "Agent Cooper" |

== Chart performance ==
"Heartbeat Song" debuted on the UK Singles Chart on 18 April 2010, where it entered the top 40 at the single's current peak of #34. The following week the single fell 15 places to #49 and on its third week in the chart, it fell a further 41 places to #90.

The single debuted at number one on the UK Indie Chart, where it spent two weeks before dropping to number three.

| Chart (2010) | Peak position |
|---|---|
| UK Singles Chart | 34 |
| UK Indie Chart | 1 |

== Critical response ==
Writing on Time Out New York's Volume blog, Noah Tarnow described "Heartbeat Song" as "possibly the greatest tune of the past million years."

== Release history ==
| Region | Date | Format | Label |
|---|---|---|---|
| United Kingdom | 12 April 2010 | Digital Download | Nul Records |
| United Kingdom | 17 April 2010 | 7" Vinyl | Nul Records |
