= The Title =

- Origin: Stoke-on-Trent, England
- Genres: Indie; Blues
- Years active: 2004–present
- Label: Sons Ltd

The Title are a British four-piece indie band based in Stoke-on-Trent, England, and signed with Sons Ltd. Their debut single, "Slippin' 'n' Slidin", charted at No. 15 in the UK Independent Singles Chart with the follow-up, "Madman" charting at No. 5.

== Singles ==
- "Slippin 'n' Slidin" (21 June 2007) SONS Records No. 15 UK
- "Madman" (24 March 2008) SONS Records No. 5 UK
