= The Chaos (album) =

Studio album by The Futureheads
- Released: 26 April 2010
- Recorded: 2009
- Studio: Britannia Row
- Genre: Post-punk revival, indie rock
- Label: Nul Records
- Producer: The Futureheads, Youth

The Futureheads chronology
This Is Not the World (2008)	The Chaos (2010)	Rant (2012)

Singles from The Chaos
- 1. "Heartbeat Song" Released: 12 April 2010; 2. "I Can Do That" Released: TBC 2010

Professional ratings
Aggregate scores
Source	Rating
Metacritic	77/100
Review scores
Source	Rating
AllMusic	3.5/5 stars
Consequence of Sound	3.5/5 stars
Drowned in Sound	8/10 stars
Filter	82%
MusicOMH	3.5/5 stars
Pitchfork	7.3/10
PopMatters	6/10
Q	4/5 stars
The Skinny	4/5 stars
Slant Magazine	3.5/5 stars

The Chaos is the fourth album by English post-punk revival band The Futureheads. It was released on 26 April 2010. The album is the band's second on their label Nul Records, and was preceded by a download-only single, 'Struck Dumb', on 2 December 2009.

== Style ==
The track "Struck Dumb", an example of the band's "classic angular guitar-rock", has been described as "a blast of pop-punk energy". As Phil Mongredien of Q magazine put it, though, in The Chaos, as in This Is Not the World, the emphasis is "on the big radio-friendly choruses, four-part choruses given a euphoric dimensions to their punk-influenced sound, with less of the earlier complex angularity".

== Track listing ==
1. "The Chaos" – 4:09
2. "Struck Dumb" – 2:50
3. "Heartbeat Song" – 2:29
4. "Stop the Noise" – 2:31
5. "The Connector" – 2:56
6. "I Can Do That" – 3:42
7. "Sun Goes Down" – 3:52
8. "This Is the Life" – 2:55
9. "The Baron" – 3:11
10. "Dart at the Map" – 4:04
11. "Jupiter" – 6:23

HMV exclusive bonus tracks

12. "Bricks & Stones"
13. "Local Man of the World"

On both the normal version and the HMV version, there is a hidden track, "Living On Light", placed after the end of the final track on each release.

== Charts ==
Chart performance for The Chaos
Chart (2010)	Peak position
Scottish Albums (OCC)	65
UK Albums (OCC)	48
