= News and Tributes =

Studio album by the Futureheads
- Released: 29 May 2006
- Recorded: 2005
- Studio: Miloco Studios, London
- Genre: Post-punk revival
- Label: 679 (UK); Vagrant/StarTime International (US)
- Producer: Ben Hillier

The Futureheads chronology
Area EP (2005)	News and Tributes (2006)	This Is Not the World (2008)

Professional ratings
Aggregate scores
Source	Rating
Metacritic	71/100
Review scores
Source	Rating
AllMusic	4/5 stars
NME	8/10
Pitchfork	7.7/10
Rolling Stone	3.5/5 stars

News and Tributes is the second full-length album by the Futureheads, released on 29 May 2006. The first single "Skip to the End" was released on 15 May 2006. The album, like their debut, received critical acclaim, and praise that the Futureheads had 'matured' their sound. However unlike their debut it did not sell very well, and led to the band being dropped by their label 679 Recordings.

With this album The Futureheads garnered comparisons to Blur, and particularly the album Modern Life Is Rubbish. It was produced by Ben Hillier, who has also produced for Blur and Depeche Mode. Singer/lyricist/guitarist Barry Hyde has revealed recently that second single "Worry About It Later" concerns "...modern attitudes towards casual sex".

The song "News and Tributes" is dedicated to the victims of the Munich air disaster, when a plane with many Manchester United players on board crashed in Munich in 1958.

The US edition of the album contains the four tracks only available on the Area EP, "Area", "Help Us Out", "We Cannot Lose" and the Shy Child remix of "Decent Days And Nights".

== Track listing ==
1. "Yes/No" – 3:00
2. "Cope" – 2:51
3. "Fallout" – 2:59
4. "Skip to the End" – 2:54
5. "Burnt" – 3:41
6. "News and Tributes" – 3:49
7. "The Return of the Berserker" – 2:36
8. "Back to the Sea" – 3:24
9. "Worry About It Later" – 3:38
10. "Favours for Favours" – 2:52
11. "Thursday" – 3:46
12. "Face" – 3:31

US bonus tracks

13. "Area" – 2:46
14. "Help Us Out" – 2:21
15. "We Cannot Lose" – 2:31
16. "Decent Days and Nights" (Shy Child remix) – 4:35

== B-sides ==
"Skip to the End" was accompanied by three B-sides when it was released as a single in 2006.

1. "Easy for Us"
2. "History Itself"
3. "Last Time Ever"

== Charts ==
Chart performance for News and Tributes
Chart (2006)	Peak position
Irish Albums (IRMA)	49
Japanese Albums (Oricon)	136
Scottish Albums (OCC)	8
UK Albums (OCC)	12
