= The Futureheads (album) =

Studio album by the Futureheads
- Released: 12 July 2004
- Recorded: 2004
- Genre: Post-punk revival, indie rock
- Length: 36:30
- Label: 679, Sire
- Producer: Paul Epworth, Andy Gill

The Futureheads chronology
1-2-3-Nul! EP (2003)	The Futureheads (2004)	Area EP (2005)

The Futureheads is the debut studio album by British rock band the Futureheads. It was released on 12 July 2004 and spawned the singles "First Day", "Decent Days and Nights", "Meantime", and "Hounds of Love" (a Kate Bush cover). The album received critical praise and was re-released as a special edition in 2005 featuring a DVD and coming with a slightly re-designed cover in pink rather than the standard LP's grey.

== Release ==
The album's artwork was inspired by the painting Lonely Man by Damien Poulain. Music videos for "Decent Days and Nights", "A to B" and "First Day" were directed by Alex Smith of production company Black Dog Films, the video for "Hounds of Love" was directed by Patrick Daughters, also of Black Dog Films, and the video for "Meantime" was directed by Sam Arthur of production company Academy Films.

Radio mixes of "Decent Days and Nights" and "Hounds of Love", mixed by Chris Lord-Alge, were included on the 2005 reissue of the album.

Professional ratings
Aggregate scores
Source	Rating
Metacritic	86/100
Review scores
Source	Rating
AllMusic	4/5 stars
Alternative Press	5/5
Entertainment Weekly	B+
The Guardian	4/5 stars
NME	8/10
Pitchfork	8.3/10
Q	4/5 stars
Rolling Stone	4/5 stars
Spin	B+
The Village Voice	B+

The album was named the 33rd best record of 2004 by Pitchfork.

== Track listing ==
All songs written by the Futureheads, except where noted.

The Futureheads track listing
No.	Title	Writer(s)	Producer	Length
1.	"Le Garage"		Paul Epworth	1:44
2.	"Robot"		Epworth	2:00
3.	"A to B"		Andy Gill	2:27
4.	"Decent Days and Nights"		Epworth	2:31
5.	"Meantime"		Epworth	2:51
6.	"Alms"		Gill	2:05
7.	"Danger of the Water"		Epworth	2:57
8.	"Carnival Kids"		Epworth	2:44
9.	"The City Is Here for You to Use"		Gill	2:35
10.	"First Day"		Gill	2:04
11.	"He Knows"		Epworth	3:14
12.	"Stupid and Shallow"		Epworth	1:35
13.	"Trying Not to Think About Time"		Gill	2:24
14.	"Hounds of Love" (Kate Bush cover)	Bush	Epworth	3:02
15.	"Man Ray"		Epworth	2:17

== Personnel ==
Personnel per booklet.

The Futureheads

- David Craig – vocals, bass guitar
- Barry Hyde – vocals, guitar
- Dave Hyde – drums
- Ross Millard – vocals, guitar

Production and design

- Paul Epworth – producer (tracks 1, 2, 4, 5, 7, 8, 11, 12, 14 and 15)
- Adrian Newton – additional engineer (tracks 1, 2 and 15), engineer (tracks 8, 11 and 12)
- Mark Rankin – additional engineer (tracks 1, 2 and 15)
- Gareth Jones – mixing (tracks 1, 2, 4, 5, 7, 8, 11, 12 and 15)
- Andy Gill – producer (tracks 3, 6, 9, 10 and 13), engineer (tracks 3, 6, 9 and 13), mixing (tracks 3, 6, 9, 10 and 13)
- Gerry Kandiah – engineer (tracks 3, 6, 9 and 13)
- Helen Ward – assistant engineer (tracks 3, 6, 9 and 13)
- Clive Goddard – mixing (tracks 3, 6, 9 and 13), assistant mix engineer (track 14)
- Al O'Connell – additional engineer (tracks 4 and 5)
- Richard Williams – additional engineer (tracks 4, 5 and 7)
- Big Active – art direction
- Tony Gibson – photography
- Clare Shilland – band photographs

== Charts ==
Chart performance for The Futureheads
Chart (2004–2005)	Peak position
Irish Albums (IRMA)	28
Scottish Albums (OCC)	96
UK Albums (OCC)	11
