= 1-2-3-Nul! =

1-2-3-Nul! EP

EP by The Futureheads
- Released: 2003
- Recorded: ??
- Genre: Post-punk revival
- Length: 8:09
- Label: Fantastic Plastic Records
- Producer: ??

The Futureheads chronology
Nul Book Standard EP (2002)	1-2-3-Nul! EP (2003)	The Futureheads (2004)

Professional ratings
Review scores
Source	Rating
Allmusic	3/5 stars

1-2-3-Nul! is an EP by British band The Futureheads, released in 2003. The album was released on Fantastic Plastic Records, before the band signed to a major label. Due to the band having gained an amount of mainstream popularity and the EP's 'limited edition' status (only 1000 copies were made) the release is now very popular among record collectors and can fetch high prices.

== Track listing ==
All tracks are written by The Futureheads, except where noted

No.	Title	Length
1.	"Carnival Kids"	2:49
2.	"Ticket"	1:25
3.	"Cabaret"	1:55
4.	"A Picture of Dorian Gray" (Dan Treacy)	2:49
