= The Beginning of the Twist =

Single by The Futureheads

from the album This Is Not the World
- Released: 10 March 2008 (UK)
- Genre: Indie rock
- Label: Nul Records
- Songwriters: David "Jaff" Craig, Barry Hyde, Dave Hyde, Ross Millard

The Futureheads singles chronology
"Worry About It Later" (2006)	"The Beginning of the Twist" (2008)	"Radio Heart" (2008)

"The Beginning of the Twist" is a song by English band the Futureheads, released on 10 March 2008 as the first single from their third album This Is Not the World. It reached No. 20 on the UK Singles Chart and No. 1 on the UK Indie Chart. It was also featured on the soundtrack to the video game Pure.

As of 2012, the song was played at the Stadium of Light on Sunderland match days, as the players' entrance music.

== Track listing ==
- CD
1. "The Beginning of the Twist"
2. "Get Out Today"
- 7" #1
1. "The Beginning of the Twist"
2. "Death of a King"
- 7" #2
1. "The Beginning of the Twist"
2. "Broke Up the Time"
