= This Is Seb Clarke =

English punk ensemble

- Origin: Stoke-on-Trent, England
- Genres: Indie; Soul; Punk
- Years active: 2004–present
- Label: Sons Ltd.

This Is Seb Clarke (TISC) are an English 12-piece soul-punk ensemble from Stoke-On-Trent, north Staffordshire. Their line-up plays Hammond organ, piano, bass, drums, lead guitar, rhythm guitar and has a brass section. The group are named after their frontman and principal songwriter, Sebastian Clarke.

This Is Seb Clarke's debut album, Rover was released in 2005. "Spring Morning Sunshine" reached No. 12 in the UK Indie Chart in 2006. The follow-up single, "I Just Can’t Carry On", from their second album, Vox, entered the indie chart at No. 7. Their third single "Rock 'n' Roll Alamo - pt 7" reached No. 1 on the same chart on 5 April 2008.

== Discography ==
=== Albums ===
Date of Release	Title	Label	UK Indie Chart
24 January 2005	Rover	SONS Ltd	12
Winter 2010	Vox	SONS Ltd	—

=== Singles ===
Date of Release	Title	Label	UK Indie Chart
15 June 2006	"Spring Morning Sunshine"	SONS Ltd	12
21 January 2007	"I Just Can't Carry On"	SONS Ltd	5
24 March 2008	"Rock 'n' Roll Alamo - pt 7"	SONS Ltd	1
12 April 2010	"Saturday Night, Sunday Morning"	SONS Ltd	29
