= This Is Not the World =

Studio album by The Futureheads
- Released: 26 May 2008
- Recorded: 2007
- Genre: Post-punk revival
- Length: 39:35
- Label: Nul
- Producer: Youth

The Futureheads chronology
News and Tributes (2006)	This Is Not the World (2008)	The Chaos (2010)

Professional ratings
Aggregate scores
Source	Rating
Metacritic	73/100
Review scores
Source	Rating
AllMusic	3.5/5 stars
Gigwise	4/5 stars
The Guardian	3/5 stars
Mojo	4/5 stars
NME	8/10
Pitchfork	6.2/10
Q	4/5 stars
Spin	3.5/5 stars
This Is Fake DIY	4/5 stars

This Is Not The World is an album by post-punk revivalists The Futureheads. It was released on 26 May 2008, on their own label Nul Records. The reason for creating their own label has been in one part the sale performance of their previous album (News and Tributes) which led the band from being dropped from their previous label (679 Recordings) and the own decision of the band of having more independence.

In advance, the Futureheads released three singles from the album. The first, "Broke Up the Time", was released in November 2007 as a free download through the band's official page and the band's MySpace. The second, "The Beginning of the Twist", was released as a video single on 1 February 2008 and was then released 'officially' on 10 March. The third single "Radio Heart", released to promote the album, was released a week prior to the album. The Futureheads also released various live renditions of "The Beginning of the Twist" for free download on their official webpage, which were recorded every night of their tour. The album was available on file sharing networks several weeks before its official release date.

== Track listing ==
All the tracks are written by The Futureheads unless stated

1. "The Beginning of the Twist" – 3:36
2. "Walking Backwards" – 3:53
3. "Think Tonight" – 3:29
4. "Radio Heart" – 3:02
5. "This Is Not the World" – 3:34
6. "Sale of the Century" – 3:23
7. "Hard to Bear" – 3:07
8. "Work Is Never Done" – 3:20
9. "Broke Up the Time" – 3:14
10. "Everything's Changing Today" – 3:06
11. "Sleet" – 3:08
12. "See What You Want" – 2:42

Japanese bonus tracks

13. "The Beginning of the Twist" (Live @ Kings College)
14. "Radio Heart" (Live @ Oxford Academy)
15. "Invasion!"

US iTunes bonus tracks

13. "Death of a King"
14. "Get Back Today"

== Charts ==
Chart performance for This Is Not the World
Chart (2008)	Peak position
Scottish Albums (OCC)	20
UK Albums (OCC)	17
UK Album Downloads (OCC)	14
UK Independent Albums (OCC)	2
