= Radio Heart (The Futureheads song) =

Single by The Futureheads

from the album This Is Not the World
- Released: 19 May 2008 (UK)
- Genre: Indie rock
- Label: Nul Records
- Songwriters: David "Jaff" Craig, Barry Hyde, Dave Hyde, Ross Millard

The Futureheads singles chronology
"The Beginning of the Twist" (2008)	"Radio Heart" (2008)	"Walking Backwards" (2008)

"Radio Heart" is the second single from The Futureheads' third album This Is Not the World. It was released on 19 May 2008 in the United Kingdom and reached #65 on the UK Singles Chart and #1 in the UK Indie Chart. The song was featured in the 2009 videogame Colin McRae: Dirt 2.

== Track listing ==
- CD
1. "Radio Heart"
2. "Charity Shop"
- 7" #1
1. "Radio Heart"
2. "Invasion!"
- 7" #2
1. "Radio Heart"
2. "Radio Heart (Live)"

== Charts ==
Chart (2008)	Peak position
UK Indie (Official Charts)	1
UK Singles (Official Charts)	65
