= Area (EP) =

Area EP

EP by the Futureheads
- Released: 28 November 2005
- Recorded: September 2005
- Studio: Miloco, London; First Avenue, Newcastle upon Tyne
- Genre: Alternative rock
- Length: n/a
- Label: 679 Recordings
- Producer: The Futureheads, Elliot James

The Futureheads chronology
The Futureheads (2004)	Area EP (2005)	News and Tributes (2006)

Professional ratings
Review scores
Source	Rating
AllMusic	3.5/5 stars

The Area EP is the follow-up release by the Futureheads after their self-titled debut album. The stand-alone EP was recorded in September 2005 in London and Newcastle upon Tyne. These tracks were re-released on the US version of News and Tributes.The title track of the EP was first premiered on the Shockwave NME Awards Tour 2005 during The Futureheads set.

== Track listing ==
All songs written by The Futureheads.

- CD1
1. "Area" – 2:45
2. "Decent Days and Nights" (Shy Child remix) – 4:38
- CD2
1. "Area" – 2:45
2. "Help Us Out" – 2:21
3. "We Cannot Lose" – 2:32
4. "Area: Video" – 2:45
- 7" Vinyl (Contains Free Poster)
1. "Area" – 2:45
2. "Help Us Out" – 2:21
3. "We Cannot Lose" – 2:32
