= Decent Days and Nights =

2004 single by the Futureheads

Single by the Futureheads

from the album The Futureheads
- Released: 26 July 2004
- Genre: Indie rock, post-punk revival, dance-punk
- Length: 2:31
- Label: 679, Sire
- Songwriters: David "Jaff" Craig, Barry Hyde, Dave Hyde, Ross Millard
- Producer: Paul Epworth

The Futureheads singles chronology
"First Day" (2003)	"Decent Days and Nights" (2004)	"Meantime" (2004)

"Decent Days and Nights" is the 2nd single by the Futureheads from their album The Futureheads. The remix of the song by Shy Child was released as a vinyl split single by Oxfam with the Black Strobe remix of Bloc Party's song 'Like Eating Glass' included. The song was included on the soundtrack of Burnout 3: Takedown.

== Track listing ==
2004 release

CD:

No.	Title	Artist	Length
1.	"Decent Days and Nights (2004 Version)"	The Futureheads	2:32
2.	"Remote Control"	The Futureheads	1:29

7" vinyl (1/2):

No.	Title	Artist	Length
1.	"Decent Days and Nights (2004 Version)"	The Futureheads	2:32
2.	"Decent Days And Nights (Phones Bad Acid Remix)"	The Futureheads	4:00

7" vinyl (2/2):

No.	Title	Artist	Length
1.	"Decent Days and Nights (Shy Child Remix)"	The Futureheads	2:40
2.	"The City Is Here For You To Use (Live At Astoria)"	The Futureheads	2:06
3.	"Piece of Crap (Live At Astoria)"	The Futureheads	2:39

2005 re-release

CD (1/2):

No.	Title	Artist	Length
1.	"Decent Days and Nights (2005 Version)"	The Futureheads	2:44
2.	"Decent Days And Nights (Max Tundra Remix)"	The Futureheads	4:42
3.	"Boring the Children"	The Futureheads	2:11

CD (2/2):

No.	Title	Artist	Length
1.	"Decent Days and Nights (2005 Version)"	The Futureheads	2:44
2.	"Banquo"	The Futureheads	2:23

7" vinyl:

No.	Title	Artist	Length
1.	"Decent Days and Nights (2005 Version)"	The Futureheads	2:44
2.	"Appreciate the Effort"	The Futureheads	2:10

Split single (with Bloc Party)

No.	Title	Artist	Length
1.	"Decent Days and Nights (Shy Child Remix)"	The Futureheads	4:38
2.	"Like Eating Glass (Black Strobe Remix)"	Bloc Party	10:28

== In popular culture ==
- Appears on the soundtrack to Burnout 3: Takedown and Rugby 2005.
- Appears as a downloadable song for the Rock Band series.

== Personnel ==
- Barry Hyde: lead vocals, guitar
- Ross Millard: guitar, backing vocals
- David "Jaff" Craig: bass, backing vocals
- Dave Hyde: drums, backing vocals
