= Nul Records =

British label record

Nul Records is an independent record label set up by the post-punk revival band The Futureheads. The label is run by the four members of the Futureheads: Ross Millard, Dave Hyde, Barry Hyde, David "Jaff" Craig, as well as their two managers.

== Overview ==
The Futureheads set up this record label some time after they split with their former record label, 679 Recordings, in late 2006, apparently disliking the direction 679 Recordings was taking them. Other sources, however, say that they were dropped by their record label because of poor sales. Millard, band guitarist and vocalist, also pointed out several shortcomings as the reason they left their label:

We had been having our doubts with 679 Records for sometime, especially after they called us five weeks before we released 'News and Tributes' and said: 'We are not sure there are enough singles on your new album, do you have any other tracks?' The album had been finished for five months and instead of telling us that at the time, they were calling us up when the promotion was about to start, that really rang the alarm bells for us.

With the record label they set up between 2006 and 2008, they started on writing songs and recording them, then finally releasing their third studio album, This Is Not The World, on 26 May 2008 in Britain. All subsequent Futureheads albums were released on Nul Records.
