= The Futureheads =

English post-punk band from Sunderland

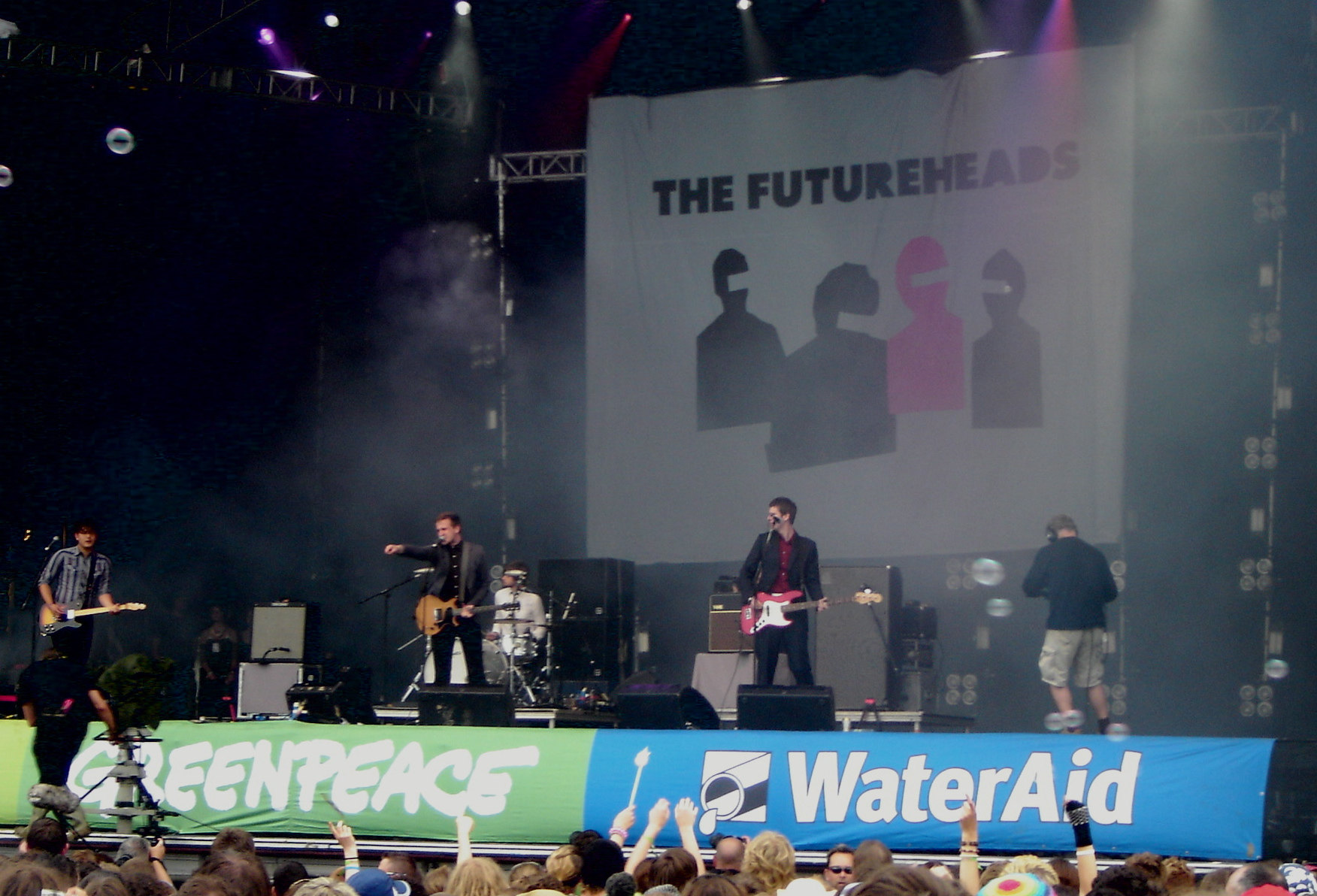
- The Futureheads perform at the 2005 Glastonbury Festival

Background information
- Origin: Sunderland, England
- Genres: Post-punk revival; indie rock
- Years active: 2000–2013, 2019–present
- Labels: Vagrant/StarTime International; 679; Nul
- Members: Ross Millard; Barry Hyde; David "Jaff" Craig; Dave Hyde
- Past members: Peter Brewis
- Website: Official website

The Futureheads are an English post-punk band from Sunderland, formed in 2000. The band consists of Ross Millard (vocals and guitar), David "Jaff" Craig (vocals and bass guitar) and brothers Barry Hyde (vocals and guitar) and Dave Hyde (drums). Their name comes from the title of the Flaming Lips album Hit to Death in the Future Head. The band's influences include new wave and post-punk bands such as Gang of Four, Devo, XTC, Wire and Fugazi.

== Career ==
=== Early days ===
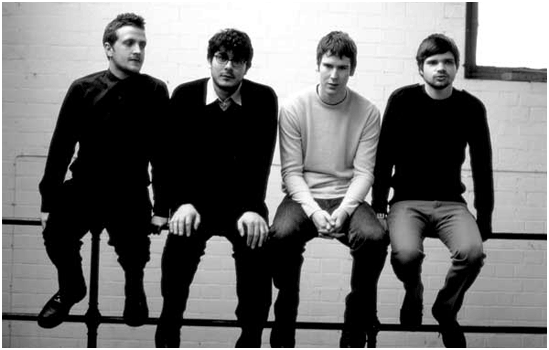
The Futureheads, early days

The band met at City of Sunderland College as a quartet consisting of Barry Hyde (vocals and guitar), David "Jaff" Craig (vocals and bass guitar), Peter Brewis (drums), and Ross Millard (vocals and guitar). Millard and Craig had been in another local band together previously. They used the Sunderland City Detached Youth Project building (where Brewis and Hyde worked) as a free practice space, fitting since the project was intended to get young people off the streets by using music. They first performed in 2000, and through word-of-mouth their reputation in the local area grew. Hyde's younger brother Dave replaced Brewis (who went on to form Field Music).

In an interview with Channel 4's 4Music, Barry Hyde revealed that Dave Hyde was given a golden guitar by his parents when he was young. But Barry had taken it off him to learn to strum his first chords. Dave was left with nothing, forcing him to take up the drums.

=== 2003–2005: self-titled first album ===
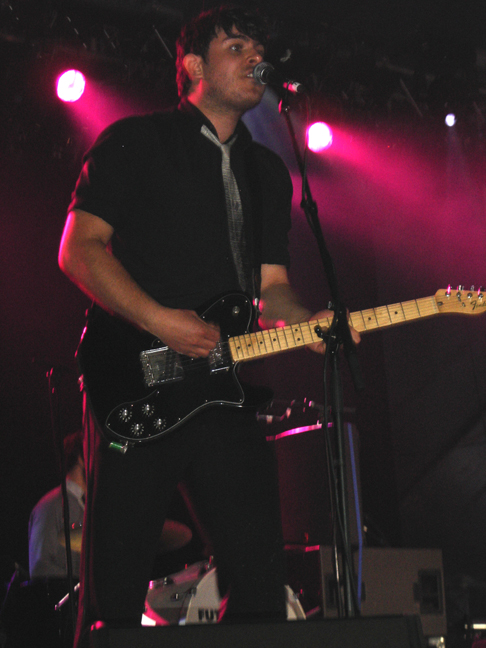
Ross Millard, guitarist, backing vocals

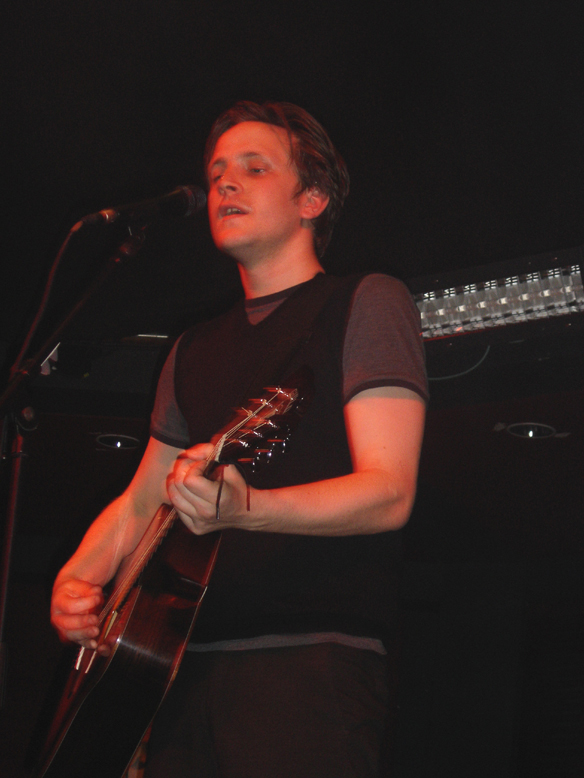
Barry Hyde, lead vocals, guitarist

The Futureheads played their first gig at Ashbrooke Cricket and Rugby Club in December 2000. They debuted with their 2002 Nul Book Standard and 2003 1-2-3-Nul! EPs, and later that year released their first single, "First Day", on 4 August. "First Day" peaked at No. 58 on the UK Singles Chart in August 2003.

The Futureheads released their self-titled debut album in September 2004 on 679 Recordings. Five of the tracks were produced by Andy Gill of Gang of Four. The rest of the album was produced by Paul Epworth. The song "Decent Days and Nights" from the album was featured in the video game soundtrack to Burnout 3 on PlayStation 2 and Xbox as well as EA's Rugby 2005.

On 21 February 2005, "Hounds of Love", a cover of the Kate Bush song, was released as a single. It reached number eight on the UK Singles Chart in its first week, and was named Single of the Year by NME. The band toured the United States with Franz Ferdinand and later supported the Pixies, Foo Fighters and Snow Patrol.

They performed at BBC Radio One's One Big Weekend, held in their home town of Sunderland over the weekend of 7–8 May 2005. On 8 May 2005, Sunderland A.F.C. picked up the Championship trophy. In tribute, the Futureheads performed a set live at the Stadium of Light as pre-match entertainment.

=== 2005–2006: News and Tributes ===
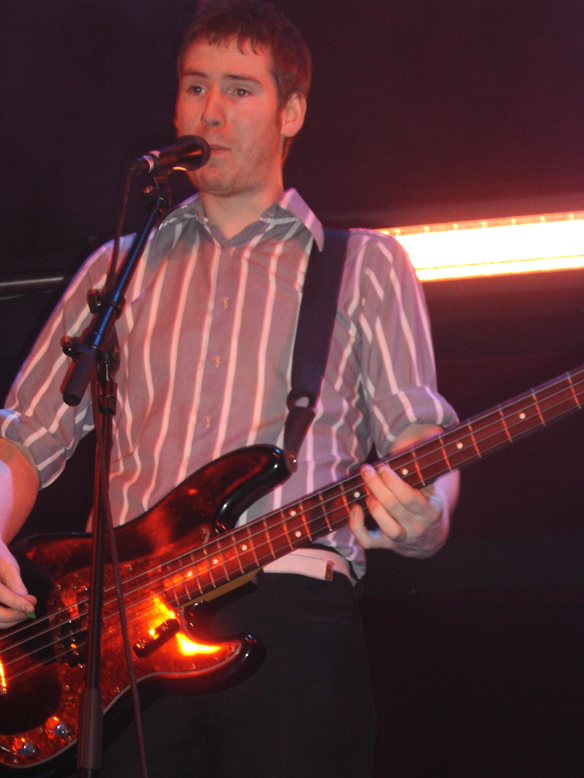
David "Jaff" Craig, bassist, backing vocals

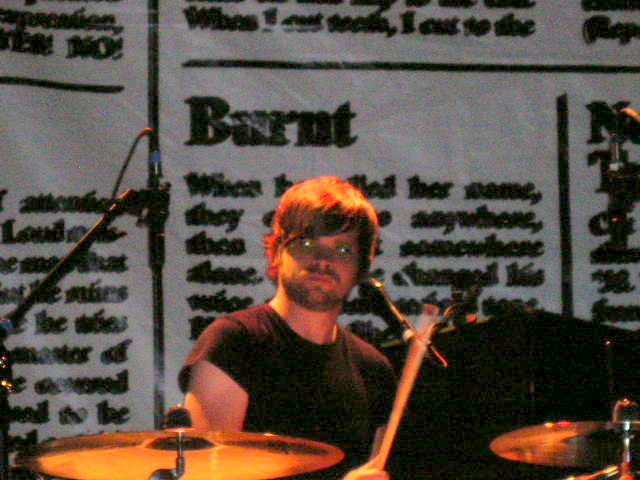
Dave Hyde, drums, backing vocals

The stand-alone EP, Area was released in November 2005 while the band was working on their second album News and Tributes (name inspired by the Munich air disaster in 1958), which, according to NME in February 2006, took only five weeks to produce. The first single from the album was "Skip to the End" released on 15 May. The album News and Tributes was first released on 29 May 2006.

The band became disillusioned with major label music business and being under contract, and were released by 679 Recordings. Hyde said: "we were desperate to get out of the record deal, they could easily have kept us and made us try and make more records but we didn't want that'.

=== 2006–2008: This Is Not the World ===
Throughout the rest of 2006, The Futureheads started their own independent record label, Nul Records, and started working on songs for their next album.

In June 2007, they reportedly completed work on their third album, This Is Not the World, which was released in May 2008. Millard said that he expected the new album to be punkier than the last album. He also revealed that the band was close to splitting during the time after the second album was released.

The band made a free download called "Broke Up the Time" available from their website on 9 November 2007. They also announced three gigs in the UK followed by a full UK tour and set up their own label, Nul Records exclusively to distribute Futureheads material. In December 2007, the band released a video of them walking around Carnaby Street, London to the single "The Beginning of the Twist". It was also accompanied by a free download of a song called "Crash".

The second single from their album, "Radio Heart" was released on 19 May 2008 from their album This Is Not The World followed by the release of the music video for the single on 16 April. A third single from the album, "Walking Backwards", was released on 4 August 2008.

=== 2008–2010: The Chaos ===
The single "I Wouldn't Be Like This If You Were Here" was released on 8 December 2008. In 2009, the band played at the biggest open-air festival in Europe – Przystanek Woodstock in Poland. In November 2009, the band allowed fans to download a new free track, "Struck Dumb", for a period of two weeks. The band released their fourth album entitled The Chaos, on 26 April 2010 in the UK. The Chaos was released in the US on 1 June 2010 on Dovecote Records.

=== 2011–2019: Rant, and hiatus ===
In 2011, the Futureheads performed in an event organised by the Sunderland A.F.C. foundation called Foundation of Light.

The Futureheads released their fifth full-length album, Rant, on 2 April 2012. In a change from their usual style, this album is entirely a cappella. The album contains re-recordings of Futureheads songs, their own renditions of several traditional folk songs plus several covers of pop and dance songs. Rant was nominated for the Artrocker Album of the Year award in 2012.

In a 2015 interview on BBC Radio 6 Music, Dave Hyde said that the Futureheads are no longer a working band, with both his brother Barry and Jaff teaching; Barry Hyde was also working on a "piano-based" solo album. However, the band got together to record a health awareness video using their song "Heartbeat Song" for BUPA which was released in April 2016.

=== 2019–present: Reunion, and Powers ===
In January 2019, the band announced on social media they had reformed, had written and recorded new material during 2018, and their first tour dates since 2013. On 5 June, they released "Jekyll", the lead single from their first album in seven years, Powers, which was later released on 30 August.

=== Other projects ===
Ross Millard is a member of Frankie & the Heartstrings, contributing to their third album Decency in 2015. Dave Hyde is one-half of the duo Hyde & Beast with Neil Bassett, formerly of the Golden Virgins. Jaff occasionally performs with School of Language.

In June 2016, Barry Hyde released his debut solo album, Malody, on Sirenspire Records. The previous year he released Ivory Cutlery online - an EP containing Ivor Cutler covers. The debut album was recorded at First Avenue Studios in Heaton, Newcastle with Dave Curle in late 2014 and early 2015. Malody (a cross between the words "melody" and "malady") features 11 songs, including two cover versions: "Sometimes It Snows in April" by Prince and "Lonely" by Tom Waits. The album, especially in the first five tracks (under-titled "The Malody Suite"), chronicles Hyde's personal experiences with chronic mental illness, a subject which he has spoken openly about in interviews and performances.

== Members ==
=== Current members ===
- Barry Hyde (born 25 June 1981) – lead vocals, guitar (2000–2013, 2019–present)
- Ross Millard – guitar, backing vocals (2000–2010, 2011–2013, 2019–present)
- David "Jaff" Craig – bass, backing vocals (2000–2013, 2019–present)
- Dave Hyde – drums, backing vocals (2000–2013, 2019–present)

=== Past members ===
- Peter Brewis – drums, backing vocals (2000)

== Discography ==
- The Futureheads (2004)
- News and Tributes (2006)
- This Is Not the World (2008)
- The Chaos (2010)
- Rant (2012)
- Powers (2019)
- Christmas (2025)
