= Ross Millard =

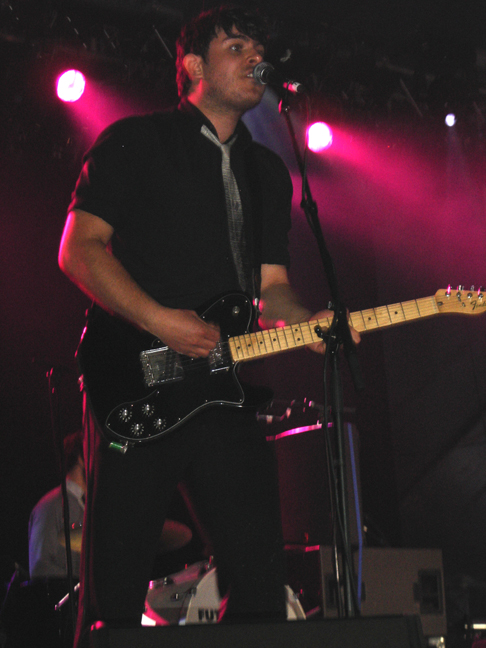

Background information
- Born: 22 July 1982 (age 43)
- Origin: Sunderland, England
- Genres: Indie rock
- Instruments: Guitar, vocals

Ross Millard (born 22 July 1982) is an English musician and graphic designer, best known as guitarist and vocalist in The Futureheads. The band released their self-titled debut album in September 2004; their second album News & Tributes followed in May 2006, with their third album This Is Not the World released in May 2008 via the band's own label Nul Records.

Millard attended Newcastle University, UK, and graduated in 2003 with a BA (Hons) in English literature.

In 2007 Millard set up his own record label Longest Mile Records with friends Paul Reed and Nick Jackson. The label's first release, on 7" vinyl and digital, was the debut single "This Is Just The Nighttime, Andy!" from North-Eastern band The Catweasels. This was followed with the release of "I'll Love You Until My Veins Explode / Milkrun" by Canadian band The Paper Cranes, "Tonight I Have To Leave It" by Shout Out Louds, and "Short Term, Long Term" by This Ain't Vegas. Millard also appeared on the Yourcodenameis:Milo collaboration album Print Is Dead Vol 1 on the song "I Remember the Summer Isles".

On 18 October 2008, he appeared on MUTV's Good Morning Manchester programme. He is of no relation to the Ross Millard who was born in 1979 and was on the books of Manchester United from 1995 to 1998.

In October 2013 Millard was attached to the short-lived project Rivals, who debuted the single "I'm Not an Animal" in October of that year.

Millard is now a regular member of Frankie & The Heartstrings, along with former This Ain't Vegas bassist Michael Matthews.

Millard is also a graphic designer, and in 2015 produced the artwork for the second BBC 6 Music festival, which took place in late February in Tyneside. He supports Manchester United, but in 2011 he took part in the Sunderland A.F.C. charity Foundation of Light event.
