= Barclay James Harvest discography =

- Studio albums: 20
- EPs: 10
- Live albums: 15
- Compilation albums: 19
- Singles: 37
- Video albums: 9
- Box sets: 4

This is the discography of British rock band Barclay James Harvest, including its subsequent incarnations as John Lees' Barclay James Harvest and Barclay James Harvest Featuring Les Holroyd.

== Albums ==
=== Studio albums ===
| Title | Album details | Peak chart positions | | | | | | | | | | Certifications |
| Title | Album details | UK | AUT | FRA | GER | NL | NOR | SPA | SWE | SWI | US | Certifications |
|---|---|---|---|---|---|---|---|---|---|---|---|---|
| Barclay James Harvest | Released: 5 June 1970; Label: Harvest; Formats: LP | — | — | — | — | — | — | — | — | — | — | |
| Once Again | Released: 5 February 1971; Label: Harvest; Formats: LP | — | — | — | — | — | — | — | — | — | — | |
| Barclay James Harvest and Other Short Stories | Released: 5 November 1971; Label: Harvest; Formats: LP | — | — | — | — | — | — | — | — | — | — | |
| Baby James Harvest | Released: 10 November 1972; Label: Harvest; Formats: LP, MC, 8-track | — | — | — | — | — | — | — | — | — | — | |
| Everyone Is Everybody Else | Released: 14 June 1974; Label: Polydor; Formats: LP, MC, 8-track | — | — | — | — | — | — | — | — | — | — | UK: Silver |
| Time Honoured Ghosts | Released: October 1975; Label: Polydor; Formats: LP, MC, 8-track | 32 | — | — | — | — | — | — | — | — | — | UK: Silver |
| Octoberon | Released: 1 October 1976; Label: Polydor; Formats: LP, MC, 8-track | 19 | — | — | 40 | — | — | — | — | — | 174 | UK: Silver |
| Gone to Earth | Released: September 1977; Label: Polydor; Formats: LP, MC, 8-track | 30 | — | — | 10 | — | 37 | — | — | — | — | GER: Platinum; SWI: Gold; UK: Silver |
| XII | Released: 29 September 1978; Label: Polydor; Formats: LP, MC, 8-track | 31 | — | — | 18 | — | — | — | — | — | — | GER: Gold; SWI: Gold |
| Eyes of the Universe | Released: 5 November 1979; Label: Polydor; Formats: LP, MC | — | 9 | 22 | 3 | — | 6 | 18 | — | — | — | FRA: Gold; GER: Platinum; SWI: Platinum |
| Turn of the Tide | Released: May 1981; Label: Polydor; Formats: LP, MC | 55 | — | 10 | 2 | — | 4 | — | — | — | — | FRA: Gold; GER: Gold; SWI: Platinum |
| Ring of Changes | Released: 16 May 1983; Label: Polydor; Formats: CD, LP, MC | 36 | — | — | 4 | 38 | 7 | — | — | — | — | FRA: Gold; GER: Gold; SWI: Gold |
| Victims of Circumstance | Released: 6 April 1984; Label: Polydor; Formats: CD, LP, MC | 33 | — | 7 | 4 | 43 | 13 | — | 42 | 1 | — | GER: Gold; SWI: Gold |
| Face to Face | Released: 30 January 1987; Label: Polydor; Formats: CD, LP, MC | 65 | — | — | 9 | — | 14 | — | — | 7 | — | |
| Welcome to the Show | Released: 5 March 1990; Label: Polydor; Formats: CD, LP, MC | — | — | — | 10 | 87 | — | — | — | 7 | — | GER: Gold; SWI: Gold |
| Caught in the Light | Released: 14 June 1993; Label: Polydor; Formats: CD, LP, MC | — | — | — | 81 | — | — | — | — | 33 | — | |
| River of Dreams | Released: 26 May 1997; Label: Polydor; Formats: CD, LP, MC | — | — | — | 71 | — | — | — | — | 33 | — | |
| Nexus (John Lees' Barclay James Harvest) | Released: 22 February 1999; Label: Eagle; Formats: CD | — | — | — | — | — | — | — | — | — | — | |
| Revolution Days (Barclay James Harvest featuring Les Holroyd) | Released: 25 February 2002; Label: M; Formats: CD | — | — | — | — | — | — | — | — | — | — | |
| North (John Lees' Barclay James Harvest) | Released: 7 October 2013; Label: Esoteric Antenna; Formats: CD, LP, digital download | — | — | — | — | — | — | — | — | — | — | |
| Relativity (John Lees' Barclay James Harvest) | Released: 17 October 2025; Label: Esoteric Antenna; Formats: CD, LP, digital download | 87 | — | — | 50 | — | — (Note: Relativity did not enter the official Norwegian Top Albums chart, but peaked at number seven on the Norwegian Physical Albums chart.) | — | — | 70 | — | |
"—" denotes releases that did not chart or were not released in that territory.

=== Live albums ===
| Title | Album details | Peak chart positions | | | | | | Certifications |
| Title | Album details | UK | AUT | FRA | GER | NOR | SWI | Certifications |
|---|---|---|---|---|---|---|---|---|
| Live | Released: November 1974; Label: Polydor; Formats: 2xLP, 2xMC, 2x8-track | 40 | — | — | — | — | — | UK: Silver |
| Live Tapes | Released: 9 June 1978; Label: Polydor; Formats: 2xLP, MC | — | — | 16 | 33 | — | — | GER: Gold |
| Berlin – A Concert for the People | Released: January 1982; Label: Polydor; Formats: LP, MC | 15 | 9 | 24 | 1 | 14 | — | GER: Gold |
| Glasnost | Released: 5 April 1988; Label: Polydor; Formats: CD, LP, MC | — | — | — | 47 | — | 30 | |
| BBC in Concert 1972 | Released: 27 May 2002; Label: EMI/Harvest; Formats: CD | — | — | — | — | — | — | |
| After the Day – The Radio Broadcasts 1974–1976 | Released: 14 April 2008; Label: Polydor; Formats: 2xCD | — | — | — | — | — | — | |
| Revival – Live 1999 (John Lees' Barclay James Harvest) | Released: 27 April 2000; Label: Eagle; Formats: CD | — | — | — | — | — | — | |
| Live In Bonn, 30th October 2002 (Barclay James Harvest featuring Les Holroyd) | Released: 13 October 2003; Label: Pure Music; Formats: CD | — | — | — | — | — | — | |
| Classic Meets Rock (Barclay James Harvest featuring Les Holroyd with Prague Philharmonic Orchestra) | Released: December 2006; Label: Kultopolis; Formats: CD | — | — | — | — | — | — | |
| Legacy – Live at the Shepherds Bush Empire, London 2006 (John Lees' Barclay James Harvest) | Released: 5 November 2007; Label: Esoteric Recordings; Formats: CD | — | — | — | — | — | — | |
| Recorded Live at Metropolis Studios, London (John Lees' Barclay James Harvest) | Released: 4 June 2012; Label: Salvo; Formats: CD+DVD | — | — | — | — | — | — | |
| High Voltage Festival – Recorded Live – July 23rd 2011 (John Lees' Barclay James Harvest) | Released: 4 November 2011; Label: Concert Live; Formats: 2xCD | — | — | — | — | — | — | |
| Retrospective (Barclay James Harvest featuring Les Holroyd) | Released: 19 February 2016; Label: ZYX Music; Formats: 2xCD, digital download | — | — | — | — | — | — | |
| The Bloomsbury Theatre, London, 30th October 2009 (John Lees' Barclay James Harvest) | Released: 6 May 2018; Label: Lepidoptera; Formats: 2xCD+DVD | — | — | — | — | — | — | |
| The 50th Anniversary Concert (John Lees' Barclay James Harvest) | Released: 23 November 2018; Label: Lepidoptera; Formats: 2xCD+DVD | — | — | — | — | — | — | |
| Philharmonic! - The Orchestral Concert (John Lees' Barclay James Harvest) | Released: 2024; Label: Esoteric Antenna / Cherry Records; Formats: 2xCD+DVD+BR | — | — | — | — | — | — | |
"—" denotes releases that did not chart or were not released in that territory.

=== Compilation albums ===
| Title | Album details | Peak chart positions | | Certifications |
| Title | Album details | GER | SWI | Certifications |
|---|---|---|---|---|
| Early Morning Onwards | Released: September 1972; Label: Starline; Formats: LP, MC, 8-track | — | — | |
| The Best of Barclay James Harvest | Released: January 1977; Label: Harvest; Formats: LP, MC | — | — | |
| The Best of Barclay James Harvest Volume 2 | Released: April 1979; Label: Harvest; Formats: LP, MC | — | — | |
| Mocking Bird – The Early Years | Released: March 1980; Label: Harvest; Formats: LP, MC | — | — | SWI: Silver |
| The Best of Barclay James Harvest Volume 3 | Released: February 1981; Label: Harvest; Formats: LP, MC | — | — | |
| The Compact Story of Barclay James Harvest | Released: October 1985; Label: Polydor; Formats: CD, MC | — | — | |
| Another Arable Parable | Released: October 1987; Label: Harvest; Formats: CD | — | — | |
| Alone We Fly | Released: 22 October 1990; Label: Connoisseur Collection; Formats: CD, 2xLP, MC | — | — | |
| The Harvest Years | Released: 20 May 1991; Label: EMI; Formats: 2xCD, 3xLP, 2xMC | — | — | |
| Best of Barclay James Harvest | Released: October 1991; Label: Polystar; Formats: CD, LP, MC | 9 | 13 | GER: Gold; SWI: Gold |
| Sorcerers + Keepers | Released: 24 May 1993; Label: Spectrum Music; Formats: CD, MC | — | — | |
| Endless Dream | Released: 29 July 1996; Label: Connoisseur Collection; Formats: CD | — | — | |
| Premium Gold Collection | Released: 29 August 1996; Label: EMI; Formats: CD; Released in the UK in February 1997 as The Best of Barclay James Harvest Centenary Collection | — | — | |
| The Collection | Released: 2 October 2000; Label: EMI; Formats: CD | — | — | |
| Mocking Bird – The Best of Barclay James Harvest | Released: 16 April 2001; Label: EMI/Harvest; Formats: CD | — | — | |
| Evolution Years – The Best of Barclay James Harvest Featuring the Songs of Les Holroyd | Released: 30 August 2004; Label: Pure Music; Formats: CD | — | — | |
| Welcome to the Show – The Best of Barclay James Harvest | Released: 21 August 2008; Label: Universal Music; Formats: 2xCD | — | — | |
| Child of the Universe – The Essential Collection | Released: 26 August 2013; Label: Spectrum Music/Universal; Formats: 2xCD | — | — | |
| Titles: The Best of Barclay James Harvest | Released: 9 December 2013; Label: Spectrum Music; Formats: CD | — | — | |
"—" denotes releases that did not chart.

=== Box sets ===
| Title | Album details |
|---|---|
| Four Barclay James Harvest Originals | Released: February 1996; Label: EMIl; Formats: 4xCD |
| "All Is Safely Gathered In" – An Anthology 1967–1997 | Released: 12 December 2005; Label: Eclectic Discs; Formats: 5xCD |
| "Sea of Tranquility" – The Polydor Years 1974–1997 | Released: 26 October 2009; Label: Esoteric Recordings; Formats: 3xCD |
| Taking Some Time On – Harvest Years (1968–73) | Released: 18 July 2011; Label: EMI/Harvest; Formats: 5xCD |

=== Video releases ===
| Title | Album details |
|---|---|
| Berlin – A Concert for the People | Released: 1983; Label: PolyGram Video; Formats: VHS, Betamax, LaserDisc |
| Victims of Circumstance | Released: 1985; Label: PolyGram Video; Formats: VHS |
| Glasnost | Released: May 1988; Label: PolyGram Video; Formats: VHS |
| Best of Barclay James Harvest – X Live Videos | Released: November 1991; Label: PolyGram Video; Formats: VHS |
| The Best of Barclay James Harvest Live | Released: June 1992; Label: Vision Video; Formats: VHS; Re-released in 2003 as 25th Anniversary Concert |
| Caught Live | Released: 11 March 2002; Label: Classic Pictures Entertainment; Formats: DVD |
| On the Road (Barclay James Harvest featuring Les Holroyd) | Released: 24 January 2005; Label: Edel; Formats: DVD |
| Classic Meets Rock (Barclay James Harvest featuring Les Holroyd with Prague Philharmonic Orchestra) | Released: 22 September 2007; Label: Kultopolis; Formats: DVD |
| Legacy – Live at the Shepherds Bush Empire, London 2006 (John Lees' Barclay James Harvest) | Released: 26 November 2007; Label: Esoteric Recordings; Formats: CD |

== EPs ==
| Title | Album details | Peak chart positions |
| Title | Album details | UK |
|---|---|---|
| Time Honoured Ghosts | Released: 1975; Label: Polydor; Formats: 7" | — |
| Live EP | Released: 4 March 1977; Label: Polydor; Formats: 7" | 49 |
| Time Honoured Tracks | Released: 1981; Label: Polydor; Formats: 7", 12"; Australia-only release | — |
| French Tour 82 | Released: 1982; Label: Polydor; Formats: 12"; France-only release | — |
| The Origin of Pieces | Released: 1999; Label: Swallowtail; Formats: CD; Fan club-only release | — |
| Strangely Mixed | Released: 2000; Label: Swallowtail; Formats: CD; Fan club-only release | — |
| Au Naturel (John Lees' Barclay James Harvest) | Released: 2001; Label: Swallowtail; Formats: CD; Fan club-only release | — |
| It's My Life (Barclay James Harvest featuring Les Holroyd) | Released: 2002; Label: Musedia; Formats: CD; Promo-only release | — |
| Bob Harris Session (5th July 1971) | Released: 13 August 2010; Label: Parlophone; Formats: digital download | — |
| Ancient Waves (John Lees' Barclay James Harvest) | Released: 19 April 2014; Label: Esoteric Antenna; Formats: 12"; Record Store Day release | |
"—" denotes releases that did not chart or were not released in that territory.

== Singles ==
| Title | Year | Peak chart positions | | | | | | Album |
| Title | Year | UK | FRA | GER | NL | SWI | US | Album |
|---|---|---|---|---|---|---|---|---|
| "Early Morning" | 1968 | — | — | — | — | — | — | Non-album singles |
| "Brother Thrush" | 1969 | — | — | — | — | — | — | Non-album singles |
| "Taking Some Time On" | 1970 | — | — | — | — | — | — | Barclay James Harvest |
| "Mocking Bird" | 1971 | — | — | — | — | — | — | Once Again |
| "She Said" (France-only release) | 1971 | — | — | — | — | — | — | Once Again |
| "I'm Over You" | 1972 | — | — | — | — | — | — | Barclay James Harvest (1972) |
| "Thank You" | 1972 | — | — | — | — | — | — | Barclay James Harvest (1972) |
| "Rock and Roll Woman" | 1973 | — | — | — | — | — | — | Non-album singles |
| "The Joker" (Denmark-only release) | 1973 | — | — | — | — | — | — | Non-album singles |
| "Poor Boy Blues" | 1974 | — | — | — | — | — | — | Everyone Is Everybody Else |
| "Titles" | 1975 | — | — | — | 11 | — | 107 | Time Honoured Ghosts |
| "Sweet Jesus" (Netherlands-only release) | 1975 | — | — | — | — | — | — | Time Honoured Ghosts |
| "Rock 'n' Roll Star" (US and Germany-only release) | 1977 | — | — | — | — | — | — | Octoberon |
| "Hymn" | 1977 | 54 (Note: Chart position is from the official UK "Breakers List".) | — | — | — | — | — | Gone to Earth |
| "Friend of Mine" | 1978 | — | — | — | — | — | — | Gone to Earth |
| "Sip of Wine" (Austria and Germany-only limited release) | 1978 | — | — | — | — | — | — | XII |
| "Loving Is Easy" | 1978 | — | — | — | — | — | — | XII |
| "Love on the Line" | 1979 | 63 | 58 | — | — | — | — | Eyes of the Universe |
| "Capricorn" | 1980 | — | — | — | — | — | — | Eyes of the Universe |
| "Life Is for Living" | 1980 | 61 | 48 | 2 | 49 | 1 | — | Turn of the Tide |
| "Waiting on the Borderline" (France and Spain-only release) | 1981 | — | 38 | — | — | — | — | Turn of the Tide |
| "Child of the Universe" (Germany-only release) | 1982 | — | — | 27 | — | — | — | Berlin – A Concert for the People |
| "Just a Day Away" | 1983 | 68 | 32 | 40 | — | 5 | — | Ring of Changes |
| "Ring of Changes" (Germany-only release) | 1983 | — | — | — | — | — | — | Ring of Changes |
| "Waiting for the Right Time" | 1983 | — | — | — | — | — | — | Ring of Changes |
| "Victims of Circumstance" | 1984 | 92 | 4 | 46 | — | 19 | — | Victims of Circumstance |
| "I've Got a Feeling" | 1984 | — | — | — | — | — | — | Victims of Circumstance |
| "He Said Love" | 1986 | — | 92 | — | — | — | — | Face to Face |
| "Panic" (Germany-only release) | 1987 | — | — | — | — | — | — | Face to Face |
| "Cheap the Bullet" | 1990 | — | — | — | — | — | — | Welcome to the Show |
| "Welcome to the Show" (Germany-only release) | 1990 | — | — | — | — | — | — | Welcome to the Show |
| "Halfway to Freedom" (Germany-only release) | 1990 | — | — | — | — | — | — | Welcome to the Show |
| "John Lennon's Guitar" (Germany-only release) | 1990 | — | — | — | — | — | — | Welcome to the Show |
| "Stand Up" | 1992 | 93 | — | — | — | — | — | Non-album single |
| "Who Do We Think We Are?" (promo-only release) | 1993 | — | — | — | — | — | — | Caught in the Light |
| "River of Dreams" (Germany promo-only release) | 1997 | — | — | — | — | — | — | River of Dreams |
| "Back in the Game" (Germany promo-only release) | 1997 | — | — | — | — | — | — | River of Dreams |
"—" denotes releases that did not chart or were not released in that territory.
