= River of Dreams Tour =

1993–1995 concert tour by Billy Joel

- Tour by Billy Joel
- Location: North America • Europe • Oceania • Asia
- Associated album: River of Dreams
- Start date: September 10, 1993
- End date: January 24, 1995
- Legs: 5
- No. of shows: 136

Billy Joel concert chronology
- Storm Front Tour (1989–91); River of Dreams Tour (1993–95); Face to Face 1994 (1994)

The River of Dreams Tour was a 1993–1995 concert tour by singer-songwriter Billy Joel. This tour was the first tour by Joel in two and a half years.

== Background ==
After spending a year and a half on tour following the release of Storm Front, Joel took a year off before recording the follow-up album River of Dreams.

Shortly before the tour started, Joel and his wife Christie Brinkley separated, and eventually filed for divorce, which was finalized in August 1994.

After performing on the Late Show with David Letterman (Joel was the first musical guest on the show), the tour kicked off in Portland, Maine, on September 10, 1993, and ended in Tokyo, Japan, on January 24, 1995.

During July and August 1994, Joel teamed up with fellow piano player Elton John on the first ever Face to Face tour in which Joel and John played 21 shows (all in stadiums) across the United States. In March and April 1995, after the River of Dreams Tour's conclusion, Joel joined John for 12 more shows across the United States, including one in Canada.

== Tour dates ==
Date	City	Country	Venue
North America
September 10, 1993	Portland	United States	Cumberland County Civic Center
September 14, 1993	Boston	United States	Boston Garden
September 17, 1993	Boston	United States	Boston Garden
September 20, 1993	Boston	United States	Boston Garden
September 23, 1993	Philadelphia	United States	The Spectrum
September 25, 1993	Philadelphia	United States	The Spectrum
September 27, 1993	Philadelphia	United States	The Spectrum
September 28, 1993	Philadelphia	United States	The Spectrum
October 2, 1993	New York City	United States	Madison Square Garden
October 4, 1993	New York City	United States	Madison Square Garden
October 6, 1993	New York City	United States	Madison Square Garden
October 8, 1993	New York City	United States	Madison Square Garden
October 9, 1993	New York City	United States	Madison Square Garden
October 12, 1993	New York City	United States	Madison Square Garden
October 14, 1993	Philadelphia	United States	The Spectrum
October 15, 1993	Philadelphia	United States	The Spectrum
October 18, 1993	Landover	United States	USAir Arena
October 19, 1993	Landover	United States	USAir Arena
October 22, 1993	Hartford	United States	Hartford Civic Center
November 2, 1993	Hartford	United States	Hartford Civic Center
November 4, 1993	Landover	United States	USAir Arena
November 6, 1993	Worcester	United States	The Centrum
November 7, 1993	Worcester	United States	The Centrum
November 12, 1993	Syracuse	United States	Carrier Dome
November 13, 1993	Syracuse	United States	Carrier Dome
November 16, 1993	Rosemont	United States	Rosemont Horizon
November 18, 1993	Cincinnati	United States	Riverfront Coliseum
November 19, 1993	Rosemont	United States	Rosemont Horizon
November 29, 1993	Portland	United States	Portland Memorial Coliseum
December 1, 1993	Seattle	United States	Seattle Center Coliseum
December 3, 1993	Vancouver	Canada	Pacific Coliseum
December 5, 1993	Oakland	United States	Oakland–Alameda County Coliseum Arena
December 7, 1993	Sacramento	United States	ARCO Arena
December 9, 1993	San Diego	United States	San Diego Sports Arena
December 11, 1993	Phoenix	United States	American West Arena
December 13, 1993	Los Angeles	United States	Los Angeles Memorial Sports Arena
December 15, 1993	Salt Lake City	United States	Delta Center
December 17, 1993	Las Vegas	United States	Thomas & Mack Center
December 18, 1993	Anaheim	United States	Arrowhead Pond of Anaheim
December 29, 1993	Uniondale	United States	Nassau Veterans Memorial Coliseum
December 31, 1993	Uniondale	United States	Nassau Veterans Memorial Coliseum
January 2, 1994	Uniondale	United States	Nassau Veterans Memorial Coliseum
January 4, 1994	Uniondale	United States	Nassau Veterans Memorial Coliseum
January 6, 1994	Uniondale	United States	Nassau Veterans Memorial Coliseum
January 8, 1994	Uniondale	United States	Nassau Veterans Memorial Coliseum
January 9, 1994	Hartford	United States	Hartford Civic Center
January 12, 1994	Pittsburgh	United States	Civic Arena
January 14, 1994	Auburn Hills	United States	The Palace of Auburn Hills
January 15, 1994	Auburn Hills	United States	The Palace of Auburn Hills
January 18, 1994	Albany	United States	Knickerbocker Arena
January 20, 1994	Albany	United States	Knickerbocker Arena
January 22, 1994	Toronto	Canada	Maple Leaf Gardens
January 25, 1994	Richfield	United States	Richfield Coliseum
January 28, 1994	Atlanta	United States	Omni Coliseum
January 29, 1994	Charlotte	United States	Charlotte Coliseum
February 4, 1994	Memphis	United States	Pyramid Arena
February 6, 1994	Birmingham	United States	Birmingham-Jefferson Civic Center Coliseum
February 8, 1994	Miami	United States	Miami Arena
February 10, 1994	St. Petersburg	United States	ThunderDome
February 12, 1994	Orlando	United States	Orlando Arena
February 14, 1994	Miami	United States	Miami Arena
February 18, 1994	Miami	United States	Miami Arena
February 19, 1994	Miami	United States	Miami Arena
March 6, 1994	Uniondale	United States	Nassau Veterans Memorial Coliseum
March 10, 1994	Minneapolis	United States	Target Center
March 12, 1994	Minneapolis	United States	Target Center
March 15, 1994	Milwaukee	United States	Bradley Center
March 17, 1994	Richfield	United States	Richfield Coliseum
March 21, 1994	Auburn Hills	United States	The Palace of Auburn Hills
March 24, 1994	Buffalo	United States	Buffalo Memorial Auditorium
March 27, 1994	Indianapolis	United States	Market Square Arena
March 29, 1994	Louisville	United States	Freedom Hall
March 31, 1994	Ames	United States	Hilton Coliseum
April 4, 1994	Dallas	United States	Reunion Arena
April 6, 1994	Houston	United States	The Summit
April 8, 1994	New Orleans	United States	Louisiana Superdome
April 10, 1994	North Charleston	United States	North Charleston Coliseum
April 12, 1994	Chapel Hill	United States	Dean Smith Center
April 15, 1994	Miami	United States	Miami Arena
April 16, 1994	Miami	United States	Miami Arena
Europe
May 7, 1994	London	England	Earls Court Exhibition Centre
May 9, 1994	London	England	Earls Court Exhibition Centre
May 11, 1994	London	England	Earls Court Exhibition Centre
May 13, 1994	Glasgow	Scotland	Scottish Exhibition and Conference Centre
May 15, 1994	Birmingham	England	NEC Arena
May 17, 1994	Rotterdam	Netherlands	Ahoy
May 18, 1994	Ghent	Belgium	Flanders Expo
May 21, 1994	Dublin	Ireland	RDS Arena
May 24, 1994	Milan	Italy	Forum di Assago
May 26, 1994	Vienna	Austria	Wiener Stadthalle
May 31, 1994	Berlin	Germany	Waldbühne
June 2, 1994	Munich	Germany	Olympiahalle
June 4, 1994	Salzburg	Austria	Residenzplatz
June 6, 1994	Dortmund	Germany	Westfalenhallen
June 8, 1994	Paris	France	Palais Omnisports de Paris-Bercy
June 10, 1994	Zürich	Switzerland	Hallenstadion
June 12, 1994	Nuremberg	Germany	Zeppelinfeld
June 14, 1994	Stuttgart	Germany	Hanns-Martin-Schleyer-Halle
June 16, 1994	Oldenburg	Germany	Weser-Ems-Halle
June 18, 1994	Frankfurt	Festhalle	
North America
October 8, 1994	Phoenix	United States	Blockbuster Desert Sky Pavilion
October 11, 1994	Denver	United States	McNichols Sports Arena
October 13, 1994	Kansas City	United States	Kemper Arena
October 15, 1994	St. Louis	United States	Kiel Center
October 17, 1994	Cleveland	United States	Gund Arena
October 19, 1994	Chicago	United States	United Center
October 22, 1994	Antioch	United States	Starwood Amphitheatre
October 23, 1994	Knoxville	United States	Thompson–Boling Arena
October 26, 1994	Moline	United States	The MARK of the Quad Cities
October 28, 1994	Champaign	United States	Assembly Hall
October 30, 1994	Fargo	United States	Fargodome
Oceania
November 13, 1994	Melbourne	Australia	National Tennis Centre
November 15, 1994	Melbourne	Australia	National Tennis Centre
November 17, 1994	Melbourne	Australia	National Tennis Centre
November 19, 1994	Melbourne	Australia	National Tennis Centre
November 22, 1994	Brisbane	Australia	Brisbane Entertainment Centre
November 24, 1994	Brisbane	Australia	Brisbane Entertainment Centre
November 26, 1994	Brisbane	Australia	Brisbane Entertainment Centre
November 28, 1994	Sydney	Australia	Sydney Entertainment Centre
November 30, 1994	Sydney	Australia	Sydney Entertainment Centre
December 2, 1994	Sydney	Australia	Sydney Entertainment Centre
December 4, 1994	Sydney	Australia	Sydney Entertainment Centre
December 5, 1994	Sydney	Australia	Sydney Entertainment Centre
December 8, 1994	Adelaide	Australia	Adelaide Entertainment Centre
December 10, 1994	Adelaide	Australia	Adelaide Entertainment Centre
December 13, 1994	Perth	Australia	Perth Entertainment Centre
December 14, 1994	Perth	Australia	Perth Entertainment Centre
December 17, 1994	Auckland	New Zealand	Western Springs Stadium
Asia
January 9, 1995	Tokyo	Japan	Nippon Budokan
January 11, 1995	Tokyo	Japan	Nippon Budokan
January 12, 1995	Tokyo	Japan	Nippon Budokan
January 15, 1995	Fukuoka	Japan	Fukuoka Dome
January 18, 1995	Osaka	Japan	Osaka-jō Hall
January 19, 1995	Osaka	Japan	Osaka-jō Hall
January 21, 1995	Yokohama	Japan	Yokohama Arena
January 23, 1995	Tokyo	Japan	Nippon Budokan
January 24, 1995	Tokyo	Japan	Nippon Budokan

== Setlist ==
This setlist is from the September 17, 1993 show at Boston Garden. It does not represent all the dates throughout the tour.

1. "A Matter of Trust"
2. "No Man's Land"
3. "Pressure"
4. "Lullabye (Goodnight, My Angel)"
5. "The River of Dreams"
6. "Prelude/Angry Young Man"
7. "Allentown"
8. "All About Soul"
9. "Scenes from an Italian Restaurant"
10. "My Life"
11. "I Go to Extremes"
12. "An Innocent Man"
13. "The Downeaster "Alexa""
14. "Shameless"
15. "Shades of Grey"
16. "Goodnight Saigon"
17. "We Didn't Start the Fire"
18. "You May Be Right"
19. "Only the Good Die Young"
20. "Miami 2017 (Seen the Lights Go Out on Broadway)"
21. "Big Shot"
22. "Piano Man"

== Personnel ==
- Billy Joel – lead vocals, piano, keyboards, harmonica
- Mark Rivera – saxophone, flute, clarinet, vocals, percussion, keyboards, rhythm guitar
- Tommy Byrnes – lead guitar, vocals
- Tom "T-Bone" Wolk – bass guitar, accordion, vocals
- David Rosenthal – keyboards
- Crystal Taliefero – percussion, saxophone, guitar.
- Liberty DeVitto – drums, percussion
