= River of Dreams (disambiguation) =

River of Dreams may refer to:

== Music ==
- River of Dreams Tour, a 1990s concert tour by Billy Joel

=== Albums ===
- River of Dreams, a 1993 album by Billy Joel, with the eponymous title track "The River of Dreams"
- River of Dreams, a 1997 album by Barclay James Harvest; see Barclay James Harvest discography
- River of Dreams: The Very Best of Hayley Westenra, a 2008 album by Hayley Westenra
- Rijeka snova (Croatian: The River of Dreams), a 2007 album by Neno Belan

=== Songs ===
- "The River of Dreams", a 1993 song by Billy Joel, the title track off the eponymous album River of Dreams
- "The River of Dreams", a 1912 song by Sadie Koninsky
- "Amazon (River of Dreams)", a 1993 song by The Band off the album Jericho ('The Band' album)
- "River of Dreams", a 1992 song by Glenn Frey off the album Strange Weather ('Glenn Frey' album)
- "River of Dreams", a 2003 song by Hayley Westenra off the album Pure ('Hayley Westenra' album)
- "River of Dreams", a 2006 song by Kate Miller-Heidke off the album Circular Breathing
- "River of Dreams", a 2013 song by Clannad off the album Nádúr

== Literature ==
- River of Dreams: The Story of the Hudson River, a book by Hudson Talbott that was turned into a musical
- Susquehanna, River of Dreams, a 1993 book by Susan Q. Stranahan
- "The River of Dreams", a short story by Le Hung nominated for the 1997 Aurealis Award for Best Fantasy Short Story
- River of Dreams, a 1984 novel by Gay Courter
- Bila Yarrudhanggalangdhuray: River of Dreams, an award-winning 2021 novel by Anita Heiss

== Other uses ==
- "Water Street: River of Dreams", an art installation at Lincoln/Cypress station, Metro-Rail, Los Angeles, California, United States
- Okavango: River of Dreams, a TV series - see List of Nat Geo Wild original programming

== See also ==
- A River Dream, a 1988 book by Allen Say
- "The River Dream", a 2016 song by Darrel Treece-Birch off the album No More Time
