= Barclay James Harvest (album) =

Studio album by Barclay James Harvest
- Released: 5 June 1970
- Recorded: 8 November 1969 – 26 January 1970
- Studio: EMI Studios, Abbey Road, London
- Genre: Progressive rock; symphonic rock
- Length: 39:42 (original LP); 1:16:53 (2002 CD)
- Label: Harvest (UK); Sire (US)
- Producer: Norman Smith

Barclay James Harvest chronology
Barclay James Harvest (1970)	Once Again (1971)

Professional ratings
Review scores
Source	Rating
AllMusic	4.5/5 stars

Barclay James Harvest is the first album by British progressive rock band Barclay James Harvest.

== Track listing ==
On the original vinyl LP all songs were credited to Holroyd/Lees/Pritchard/Wolstenholme. The list below shows the actual composers.

=== Side one ===
1. "Taking Some Time On" (John Lees) – 5:31
2. "Mother Dear" (Lees) – 3:20
  Arranged and conducted by Norman Smith
3. "The Sun Will Never Shine" (Woolly Wolstenholme) – 5:07
4. "When the World Was Woken" (Les Holroyd) – 5:50

=== Side two ===
5. "Good Love Child" (Lees) – 5:10
6. "The Iron Maiden" (Wolstenholme) – 2:43
7. "Dark Now My Sky" (Lees) – 12:01
  Arranged and conducted by Robert John Godfrey

=== Bonus tracks ===
Barclay James Harvest was remastered and reissued by Harvest in 2002 as Their First Album with several bonus tracks:

8. "Early Morning" (A-side of first single, 1968) (Holroyd, Lees, Mel Pritchard, Wolstenholme) – 2:34
9. "Mister Sunshine" (B-side of first single, 1968) (Wolstenholme) – 2:54
10. "So Tomorrow" (Holroyd, Lees, Pritchard, Wolstenholme) – 3:28
11. "Eden Unobtainable" (Holroyd) – 3:10
12. "Night" (Wolstenholme) – 3:20
13. "Pools of Blue" (Lees) – 3:29
14. "Need You Oh So Bad" (Wolstenholme) – 1:18
15. "Small Time Town" (Lees) – 2:12
16. "Dark Now My Sky" (Lees ) – 3:43
17. "I Can't Go on Without You" (Out-take, 1968) (Wolstenholme) – 2:13
18. "Eden Unobtainable" (Out-take, 1968) (Holroyd) – 3:04
19. "Poor Wages" (Single B-side, 1969) (Wolstenholme) – 2:34
20. "Brother Thrush" (Single A-side, 1969) (Lees) – 3:06
- Tracks 10–16: previously unreleased
- Tracks 10–11: from the BBC Session 20 April 1968
- Tracks 12–16: from the BBC Session 30 July 1968

== Deluxe edition ==
In 2018 a multi format re-mastered limited deluxe edition was released. Initially available in a 3 CD and 1 DVD with the full 5.1 surround sound mix and 33 bonus tracks, there is also a 2 CD edition with the remaster and a limited number of bonus tracks.

== Personnel ==
Barclay James Harvest

- John Lees – vocals, guitars, recorder
- Les Holroyd – lead vocals (1, 4, 5, 7), bass guitar, guitar, cello
- Stuart "Woolly" Wolstenholme – lead vocals (2, 3, 6, 7), mellotron, keyboards, guitar, harmonica
- Mel Pritchard – drums, percussion

Additional personnel

- James Litherland – guitar on "Taking Some Time On"
- The Barclay James Harvest Symphony Orchestra
  - Orchestra Leader: Gavyn Wright
  - Conductor and Musical Director: Robert Godfrey
- Engineer: Phil McDonald

== Cover ==
The original gatefold cover was designed by Ian Latimer, with photography by Richard Dunkley.
