= Everyone Is Everybody Else =

Studio album by Barclay James Harvest
- Released: 14 June 1974
- Recorded: March–April 1974
- Studio: Olympic Studios, London
- Genre: Progressive rock
- Length: 38:56
- Label: Polydor
- Producer: Rodger Bain

Barclay James Harvest chronology
Baby James Harvest (1972)	Everyone Is Everybody Else (1974)	Time Honoured Ghosts (1975)

Professional ratings
Review scores
Source	Rating
AllMusic	4/5 stars
The Encyclopedia of Popular Music	5/5 stars

Everyone Is Everybody Else is the fifth studio album by British rock band Barclay James Harvest released in June 1974. This was their first album for the Polydor label after they had parted company with EMI.

The album was produced by Rodger Bain, who had previously worked with Black Sabbath in producing their first three albums. He also produced heavy rock bands Judas Priest and Budgie. There was said to be strained relations between Bain and the band, due to the preference of his musical style, with the band unhappy with the results of the song "Child of the Universe" in particular; Woolly Wolstenholme's only contribution was also left off the original album.

The album was played extensively on Radio Caroline, particularly the tracks "For No One" (whose lyrics contain the title of the album) and "Child of the Universe". The album was voted by Radio Caroline listeners at No. 13 on the Top 100 All Time Album Chart. The album led to a BBC Radio 1 session with John Peel.

== Track listing ==
Side one
No.	Title	Writer(s)	Length
1.	"Child of the Universe"	John Lees	5:02
2.	"Negative Earth"	Les Holroyd, Mel Pritchard	5:28
3.	"Paper Wings"	Holroyd, Pritchard	4:14
4.	"The Great 1974 Mining Disaster"	Lees	4:35

Side two
No.	Title	Writer(s)	Length
5.	"Crazy City"	Holroyd	4:05
6.	"See Me See You"	Lees	4:32
7.	"Poor Boy Blues"	Holroyd	3:05
8.	"Mill Boys"	Lees	2:47
9.	"For No One"	Lees	5:08

Bonus Tracks - Everyone Is Everybody Else was remastered and reissued by Polydor in 2003 with several bonus tracks.
No.	Title	Writer(s)	Length
10.	"Child of the Universe" (USA single version)		2:51
11.	"The Great 1974 Mining Disaster" (Original Mix)		4:46
12.	"Maestoso (A Hymn in the Roof of the World)"	Woolly Wolstenholme	5:30
13.	"Negative Earth" (Original Mix)		5:33
14.	"Child of the Universe" (Remake for planned USA single)		3:36

Everyone Is Everybody Else was remastered for a second time in 2016 and reissued by Esoteric Recordings (through Cherry Red Records). This 2 CD/1 DVD set includes the complete original mix of the album, the 4 bonus tracks that appeared on the Polydor reissue, a new remix of the album (which excludes "For No One" which only appears on the first disc "original mix" of the album), a 2016 remix of the U.S. single version of "Child of the Universe" and a DVD which includes a new 5.1 multichannel mix of the album (again, minus "For No One") and a 5.1 mix of US single recording of "Child of the Universe".

== Personnel ==
Barclay James Harvest

- John Lees – lead and acoustic guitars; lead vocals (tracks 1, 4, 6, 8, 9), backing vocals (tracks 1, 3, 4, 7–9)
- Les Holroyd – bass, acoustic and rhythm guitars; lead vocals (tracks 2, 3, 5, 7), backing vocals (tracks 1, 3, 4, 7–9), "picked" guitar (tracks 7, 8)
- Stuart "Woolly" Wolstenholme – keyboards; backing vocals (tracks 1, 3, 4, 9)
- Mel Pritchard – drums, percussion; backing vocals (track 1)

Additional personnel

- Rodger Bain – producer
- Rufus Cartwright – engineer
- Ted Sharp – engineer, mixing engineer
- Alex Agor – photography

== Certifications ==
Region	Certification	Certified units/sales
United Kingdom (BPI)	Silver	60,000^{^}
^{^} Shipments figures based on certification alone.
