= Teenage Heart =

Teenage Heart may refer to:

- Teenage Heart, 1980 album by The Meteors (Dutch band)
- "Teenage Heart", song by Barclay James Harvest Ring of Changes 1983
- "Teenage Heart", song by Cock Sparrer on Shock Troops (album)
- "Teenage Heart", song by Lady Antebellum Heart Break (Lady Antebellum album) 2017
- "My Teenage Heart", Bay City Rollers (album)
