= Once Again (Barclay James Harvest album) =

Studio album by Barclay James Harvest
- Released: 5 February 1971
- Recorded: 9 October – 25 November 1970
- Studios: EMI Studios, London
- Genres: Progressive rock, art rock, symphonic rock
- Length: 40:21 (LP); 61:02 (expanded CD)
- Labels: Harvest (UK); Sire (USA)
- Producer: Norman Smith

Barclay James Harvest chronology
Barclay James Harvest (1970)	Once Again (1971)	Barclay James Harvest and Other Short Stories (1971)

Professional ratings
Review scores
Source	Rating
AllMusic	3.5/5 stars

Once Again was the second album released by Barclay James Harvest, in early 1971. As was the case with their other early albums, it was recorded with a full orchestra.

On the track "Galadriel", Lees played John Lennon's Epiphone Casino guitar, an event later recounted in a song on the band's 1990 album Welcome To The Show titled "John Lennon's Guitar".

In an interview with Songfacts, Keith Domone (official biographer of Barclay James Harvest with his wife Monika) said John Lees wrote "Mocking Bird" back in 1968 while he was living with the parents of his future wife, Olwen. The song is based on a musical phrase from "Pools Of Blue", which he wrote around the same time.

In the Q & Mojo Classic Special Edition ‘’Pink Floyd & The Story of Prog Rock’’, the album came #39 in its list of "40 Cosmic Rock Albums".

== Track listing ==
The credits on the original liner notes are incorrect, titles being attributed to the band as a whole. The credits shown here are the actual composers.

Side one

1. "She Said" (Les Holroyd, John Lees, Mel Pritchard, Stuart Wolstenholme) – 8:21
2. "Happy Old World" (Wolstenholme) – 4:40
3. "Song for Dying" (Lees) – 5:02
4. "Galadriel" (Lees) – 3:14

Side two

5. "Mocking Bird" (Lees) – 6:39
6. "Vanessa Simmons" (Lees) – 3:45
7. "Ball And Chain" (Wolstenholme) – 4:49
8. "Lady Loves" (Lees) – 4:07

=== Reissue (2002) ===
Bonus tracks

Once Again was remastered and reissued by Harvest in 2002 with five bonus tracks: 2 outtakes and 3 from the 1973 quadrophonic mix of the album.

9. "Introduction - White Sails (A Seascape)" (Wolstenholme) – 1:43 arranged by Robert Godfrey
10. "Too Much On Your Plate" (Wolstenholme, Lees) – 5:28
11. "Happy Old World" – 4:40 Quadrophonic mix
12. "Vanessa Simmons" – 3:46 Quadrophonic mix
13. "Ball and Chain" – 4:48 Quadrophonic mix

=== Boxed Set (2023) ===
Once Again was remastered for a second time in 2023 and reissued by Esoteric Recordings (through Cherry Red Records). This 3 CD/1 Blu-Ray set includes the complete original mix of the album, a new remix of the entire album, a stereo mix down of the 1972 quadrophonic mix ("The 1972 Quadrophonic SQ Stereo Mix") and 10 bonus tracks spread across the 3 CD's. The DVD includes a new 5.1 multichannel mix of the album, the 1973 Quadrophonic Mix in 4.0 surround sound, high resolution stereo versions of both the original mix and the new remix of the original album plus 5.1 multichannel mixes of 2 bonus tracks.

Disc one - The Original Stereo Mix, remastered

1. – 8. original track listing

Bonus tracks:

9. "Too Much on Your Plate" (outtake) – 5:33
10. "Happy Old World (Take One)" – 4:41
11. "She Said (John Peel Sunday Concert 21st February 1971)" – 8:46
12. "Mocking Bird (John Peel Sunday Concert 21st February 1971)" – 7:46
13. "Dark Now My Sky (John Peel Sunday Concert 21st February 1971)" – 10:10

Disc two - The New Stereo Mix by Steven W. Taylor

1. "She Said" – 10:02
2. "Happy Old World" – 4:38
3. "Song for Dying" – 6:51
4. "Galadriel" – 3:12
5. "Mocking Bird" – 6:53
6. "Vanessa Simmons" – 3:48
7. "Ball and Chain" – 4:51
8. "Lady Loves" – 4:19

Bonus tracks

9. "Too Much On Your Plate" – 5:40
10. "White Sails (A Seascape)" – 11:53
11. "Mocking Bird (First Version, May 1970)" – 6:57

Disc three – 1972 Quadrophonic SQ Stereo Mix

1. – 8. original track listing

Bonus tracks:

9. "Galadriel (Non-Orchestral Version)" – 3:14
10. "Mocking Bird (Non-Orchestral Version)" – 8:03

Disc four (Blu-Ray) – The New 5.1 Surround Sound & Stereo Mix by Steven W. Taylor

1. – 8. original track listing

Bonus tracks:

1. "Too Much On Your Plate" (Wolstenholme)
2. "White Sails (A Seascape)" (Barclay James Harvest)

The High Resolution 96 kHz/24-bit 1971 Stereo Mix & 1973 Quadrophonic Mix

1. – 8. original track listing

== Personnel ==
Barclay James Harvest

- John Lees – guitars, recorder, lead (4, 6) and backing vocals
- Les Holroyd – bass, guitars, keyboards, backing vocals
- Stuart "Woolly" Wolstenholme – mellotron, keyboards, lead (1–3, 5, 7, 8) and backing vocals
- Mel Pritchard – drums, percussion

Additional personnel

- The Barclay James Harvest Symphony Orchestra

- Orchestra Leader: Gavyn Wright
- Conductor and Musical Director: Robert John Godfrey

- Alan Parsons – jaw harp on "Lady Loves"
- Engineer: Peter Bown
