= Time Honoured Ghosts =

Studio album by Barclay James Harvest
- Released: October 1975
- Recorded: May – July 1975
- Studio: His Masters Wheels (San Francisco)
- Genres: Progressive rock, soft rock
- Length: 39:52
- Label: Polydor
- Producer: Elliot Mazer

Barclay James Harvest chronology
Everyone Is Everybody Else (1974)	Time Honoured Ghosts (1975)	Octoberon (1976)

Professional ratings
Review scores
Source	Rating
Allmusic	3/5 stars

Time Honoured Ghosts is the sixth studio album released by the English rock group, Barclay James Harvest in October 1975. The title was suggested by the wife of Harvey Lisberg, the band's manager at the time, though it is believed that she was quoting from another unknown source. It was recorded between May and July 1975 at the "His Masters Wheels" studio in San Francisco. It was produced by Elliot Mazer and released in October on the Polydor Records label.

== Track listing ==
Side one
No.	Title	Writer(s)	Length
1.	"In My Life"	John Lees	4:39
2.	"Sweet Jesus"	Les Holroyd	3:30
3.	"Titles"	Traditional, arranged by John Lees	3:49
4.	"Jonathan"	Holroyd	4:45
5.	"Beyond the Grave"	Woolly Wolstenholme	4:08

Side two
No.	Title	Writer(s)	Length
1.	"Song for You"	Holroyd	5:20
2.	"Hymn for the Children"	Lees	3:39
3.	"Moongirl"	Holroyd	4:51
4.	"One Night"	Lees	5:21

Bonus track on the 2003 remastered CD
No.	Title	Writer(s)	Length
10.	"Child of the Universe" (1975 remake for planned U.S. single)	Lees	2:49

In 2021, the album was again remastered with a DVD which had a 5.1 surround sound version of the original tapes of this album. Also included on the DVD are promotional films for "Jonathan", "Titles", "Moongirl", "One Night", and "Beyond The Grave". The song "Jonathan" is inspired by Richard Bach's 1972 novel, Jonathan Livingston Seagull.

== Personnel ==
Barclay James Harvest

- John Lees – electric and acoustic guitars, vocals (tracks 1, 3, 7, 9)
- Les Holroyd – bass, acoustic guitars, vocals (tracks 2, 4, 6, 8)
- Stuart "Woolly" Wolstenholme – keyboards, vocals (track 5)
- Mel Pritchard – drums, percussion

== Certifications ==
Region	Certification	Certified units/sales
United Kingdom (BPI)	Silver	60,000^{^}
^{^} Shipments figures based on certification alone.
