= Eyes of the Universe =

Studio album by Barclay James Harvest
- Released: 5 November 1979
- Recorded: July – September 1979
- Studios: Strawberry Studios, Stockport
- Genres: Progressive rock, pop rock, new wave
- Length: 42:59
- Label: Polydor
- Producers: Barclay James Harvest, Martin Lawrence

Barclay James Harvest chronology
XII (1978)	Eyes of the Universe (1979)	Turn of the Tide (1981)

Eyes of the Universe is the tenth studio album released by Barclay James Harvest in November 1979. It is the first album released by the band following the departure of Stuart "Woolly" Wolstenholme.

== Track listing ==
Side one
No.	Title	Writer(s)	Length
1.	"Love On The Line"	Les Holroyd	4:38
2.	"Alright Down Get Boogie (Mu Ala Rusic)"	John Lees	3:57
3.	"The Song (They Love to Sing)"	Holroyd	6:08
4.	"Skin Flicks"	Lees	6:52

Side two
No.	Title	Writer(s)	Length
1.	"Sperratus"	Lees	5:01
2.	"Rock 'n' Roll Lady"	Holroyd	4:29
3.	"Capricorn"	Lees	4:33
4.	"Play to the World"	Holroyd	7:03

Bonus tracks on Eclectic (2006) and Esoteric (2013) remaster
No.	Title	Writer(s)	Length
1.	"Sperratus" (previously unreleased single edit)	Lees	3:28
2.	"Rock'n'Roll Lady" (previously unreleased single edit)	Holroyd	3:26
3.	"Capricorn" (single edit)	Lees	3:37
4.	"Play to the World" (previously unreleased single mix)	Holroyd	3:55

== Personnel ==
Barclay James Harvest

- John Lees
- Les Holroyd
- Mel Pritchard

with:

- Kevin McAlea – grand piano and MiniMoog on "The Song (They Love to Sing)"; Yamaha Cs80 synthesizer and C3 Hammond organ on "Sperratus"
- Alan Fawkes – saxophone on "Play to the World"
