= Gone to Earth (Barclay James Harvest album) =

Studio album by Barclay James Harvest
- Released: September 1977
- Recorded: March–June 1977
- Studio: Strawberry, Stockport, England
- Genre: Progressive rock
- Length: 39:50
- Label: Polydor
- Producer: Barclay James Harvest, David Rohl

Barclay James Harvest chronology
Octoberon (1976)	Gone to Earth (1977)	XII (1978)

Gone to Earth is the eighth studio album by the English rock group Barclay James Harvest, released in 1977.

== Background ==
"Poor Man's Moody Blues" was written after a journalist angered the band by referring to Barclay James Harvest as a "poor man's Moody Blues". In response, guitarist John Lees wrote a song which sounded like the Moody Blues song "Nights in White Satin", but in fact was cleverly not the same - the words would not fit. Justin Hayward was not pleased; meeting him years later, bassist Les Holroyd apologised for it.

Other songs on the album deal with subjects like ended relationships ("Friend of Mine"), alienation ("Leper's Song") the exploitation of animals for their fur ("Spirit on the Water") and the space race ("Sea of Tranquility").

The album's title, Gone to Earth, refers to the fox hunter's cry used to indicate that the quarry has returned to its lair.

The original LP version of the album, designed by Maldwyn Tootill, featured die-cut outer cover and full-color inner album sleeve. On one side of the inner sleeve was an owl (as shown in the picture); on the other side was a picture of a sunset. The inner sleeve could be reversed so that either side would be displayed through the die cut.

== Reception ==
Gone to Earth reached No. 30 in the UK Albums Chart; in Germany it peaked at No. 10 and stayed for 197 weeks in the German album charts. As of 2011 it is ranked No. 6 on the list of longest running albums in the German album charts. Only the My Fair Lady soundtrack and albums by Simon & Garfunkel (Greatest Hits), The Beatles (1962–1966), Pink Floyd (Wish You Were Here) and Andrea Berg (Best Of) spent more weeks in the charts. It was the band's largest selling album, eventually selling more than a million copies worldwide.

"Hymn" (often misinterpreted as a Christian song but actually one against the dangers of drug use and dedicated to musicians: Jimi Hendrix, Paul Kossoff and Janis Joplin) was a successful turntable hit at German radio stations in the late 1970s.

== Track listing ==
Side one
No.	Title	Writer(s)	Length
1.	"Hymn"	John Lees	5:06
2.	"Love is Like a Violin"	Lees	4:03
3.	"Friend of Mine"	Les Holroyd	3:30
4.	"Poor Man's Moody Blues"	Lees	6:55

Side two
No.	Title	Writer(s)	Length
1.	"Hard Hearted Woman"	Holroyd	4:27
2.	"Sea of Tranquility"	Woolly Wolstenholme	4:03
3.	"Spirit on the Water"	Holroyd	4:49
4.	"Leper's Song"	Lees	3:34
5.	"Taking Me Higher"	Holroyd	3:07

Bonus tracks of the 2003 CD Edition
No.	Title	Length
10.	"Lied" (previously unissued)	5:05
11.	"Our Kid's Kid" (B-side of Polydor 2058 904 "Hymn/Our Kid's Kid")	4:00
12.	"Hymn" (single edit - previously unissued)	4:26
13.	"Friend of Mine" (single version - A/B side of Polydor 2059 002 "Friend Of Mine/Suicide? (live)")	3:01
14.	"Medicine Man" (originally released as A/B side of "BJH Live" EP)	11:53

== Personnel ==
Barclay James Harvest

- John Lees – vocals, guitars
- Les Holroyd – vocals, bass, guitars, keyboards
- Stuart "Woolly" Wolstenholme – vocals, mellotron, keyboards
- Mel Pritchard – drums, percussion

== Charts ==
=== Weekly charts ===
Chart (1978)	Peak position
German Albums (Offizielle Top 100)	10
Norwegian Albums (VG-lista)	37
UK Albums (OCC)	30

Chart (2026)	Peak position
Greek Albums (IFPI)	45

=== Year-end charts ===
Chart (1978)	Position
German Albums (Offizielle Top 100)	33
Chart (1979)	Position
German Albums (Offizielle Top 100)	5
Chart (1980)	Position
German Albums (Offizielle Top 100)	6
Chart (1981)	Position
German Albums (Offizielle Top 100)	31

== Certifications and sales ==
Region	Certification	Certified units/sales
Germany (BVMI)	Platinum	500,000^{^}
Switzerland (IFPI Switzerland)	Gold	25,000^{^}
United Kingdom (BPI)	Silver	60,000^{^}
^{^} Shipments figures based on certification alone.
