= Dream River (disambiguation) =

Dream River may refer to:

== Music ==
- Dream River, a 2013 album by Bill Callahan
- Dream River (Chinese: 夢的河流), a 2001 album by Wu Bai
- "Dream River", a 1998 song off the album Trampoline ('The Mavericks' album) by The Mavericks
- "Dream River", a 2008 song off the album The Haunted Melody by Steve Howe Trio
- "Dream River", a 2023 song off the album Sea of Mirrors by The Coral
- "Dream River", a song by Billy Hill (songwriter)

== Other uses ==
- Dream River, a fictional location in Advanced Dungeons and Dragons in the expansion Red Steel (boxed set)

== See also ==
- River of Dreams (disambiguation)
