= Don't Let It Die =

Single by Hurricane Smith
- Released: 1971
- Genre: Pop rock
- Length: 2:29
- Songwriter: Hurricane Smith
- Producer: Hurricane Smith

Hurricane Smith singles chronology
"Don't Let It Die" (1971)	"Oh Babe, What Would You Say" (1972)

Don't Let It Die is a song written, produced, and sung by Hurricane Smith. It was originally recorded by Smith as a demo in the hopes that John Lennon would record the song. Following advice from Mickie Most, Smith decided to release it himself. It made #2 on the UK Singles Chart, with Middle Of The Road's Chirpy Chirpy Cheep Cheep keeping it from the top spot.

Smith received the 1971 Ivor Novello award for Best Song Musically and Lyrically. The lyrics have an ecological theme, stressing the beauty and fragility of nature, and the human responsibility to look after it, not to "let it die".
