= Face to Face 1994 =

1994 concert tour by Elton John and Billy Joel

- National tour by Elton John and Billy Joel
- Poster to the concert in San Antonio, USA
- Location: U.S., North America
- Start date: July 8, 1994
- End date: August 21, 1994
- Legs: 1
- No. of shows: 21 in total
Elton John tour chronology
The One Tour (1992–93)	Face to Face 1994 (1994)	Face to Face 1995 (1995)
Billy Joel tour chronology
River of Dreams Tour (1993–95)	Face to Face 1994 (1994)	Face to Face 1995 (1995)

Beginning in 1994, Elton John toured extensively with Billy Joel on a series of Face to Face tours, making them the longest running and most successful concert tandem in pop music history. During these shows, the two played their own songs, each other's songs and performed duets. They grossed over US $46 million in just 24 days in their sold out 2003 tour. John and Joel resumed the Face to Face tour in March 2009 and it ended again in March 2010. Joel denied rumors in the trade press that he canceled a summer 2010 leg of the tour, claiming there were never any dates booked and that he intended to take the year off. Joel stated in 2012 that he would no longer tour with John because it restrains his setlists.

The 1994 tour proved a major success playing to huge audiences in packed stadiums across the U.S. starting in East Coast America and ending in South East America.

== Tour dates ==
Date	City	Country	Venue	Tickets sold / available	Revenue
North America
July 8, 1994	Philadelphia	United States	Veterans Stadium	150,511 / 150,511	$7,315,495
July 9, 1994	Philadelphia	United States	Veterans Stadium	150,511 / 150,511	$7,315,495
July 12, 1994	Philadelphia	United States	Veterans Stadium	150,511 / 150,511	$7,315,495
July 14, 1994	Orchard Park	United States	Rich Stadium	57,058 / 57,500	$2,380,834
July 17, 1994	Foxborough	United States	Foxboro Stadium		
July 18, 1994	Foxborough	United States	Foxboro Stadium		
July 20, 1994	Washington, D.C.	United States	RFK Stadium	51,762 / 51,762	$2,250,520
July 22, 1994	East Rutherford	United States	Giants Stadium	293,539 / 293,539	$14,889,127
July 24, 1994	East Rutherford	United States	Giants Stadium	293,539 / 293,539	$14,889,127
July 26, 1994	East Rutherford	United States	Giants Stadium	293,539 / 293,539	$14,889,127
July 28, 1994	East Rutherford	United States	Giants Stadium	293,539 / 293,539	$14,889,127
July 29, 1994	East Rutherford	United States	Giants Stadium	293,539 / 293,539	$14,889,127
August 2, 1994	Pittsburgh	United States	Three Rivers Stadium	48,829 / 48,829	$2,203,037
August 6, 1994	Columbus	United States	Ohio Stadium	67,606 / 67,606	$2,710,335
August 9, 1994	St. Louis	United States	Busch Stadium	50,807 / 50,807	$2,445,245
August 11, 1994	Milwaukee	United States	Milwaukee County Stadium	55,526 / 55,526	$2,480,520
August 13, 1994	Ames	United States	Cyclone Stadium	52,196 / 52,196	$2,393,516
August 16, 1994	San Antonio	United States	Alamodome	48,741 / 48,741	$2,009,237
August 18, 1994	Pontiac	United States	Pontiac Silverdome	54,125 / 54,125	$2,444,334
August 19, 1994	Atlanta	United States	Georgia Dome	53,356 / 53,356	$2,632,943
August 21, 1994	Orlando	United States	Citrus Bowl	58,320 / 58,320	$2,297,254
Total				989,020 / 989,462	$48,452,497

== Setlist ==
Standard setlist

Elton John & Billy Joel

1. Your Song
2. Honesty
3. Don't Let the Sun Go Down on Me

Elton John

1. Philadelphia Freedom
2. Take Me to the Pilot
3. Levon
4. Rocket Man
5. Simple Life
6. The One
7. New York State of Mind
8. Funeral for a Friend/Love Lies Bleeding
9. I Guess That's Why They Call It the Blues (with Billy Joel)
10. Can You Feel the Love Tonight
11. Saturday Night's Alright for Fighting
12. Pinball Wizard

Billy Joel

1. I Go to Extremes
2. Pressure
3. Angry Young Man
4. Goodbye Yellow Brick Road
5. Scenes from an Italian Restaurant
6. My Life (with Elton John)
7. Allentown
8. Lullaby
9. River of Dreams
10. We Didn't Start the Fire
11. It's Still Rock and Roll to Me
12. Only the Good Die Young

Elton John & Billy Joel

1. The Bitch Is Back
2. You May Be Right
3. Bennie and the Jets

Encore

1. Hard Day's Night (Lennon/McCartney)
2. Lucille (Richard Penniman/Albert Collins)
3. Great Balls of Fire (Jack Hammer/Otis Blackwell)
4. Piano Man
