= Baby James Harvest =

Studio album by Barclay James Harvest
- Released: 10 November 1972
- Recorded: September 1972
- Studios: Strawberry Studios, Abbey Road Studios
- Length: 37:32 (original LP)
- Label: Harvest
- Producer: Barclay James Harvest

Barclay James Harvest chronology
Barclay James Harvest and Other Short Stories (1971)	Baby James Harvest (1972)	Everyone Is Everybody Else (1974)

Professional ratings
Review scores
Source	Rating
AllMusic	4.5/5 stars

Baby James Harvest is the fourth album by the English progressive rock band Barclay James Harvest, released in 1972.

== Track listing ==
=== Side one ===
1. "Crazy (Over You)" (Les Holroyd) – 4:17
2. "Delph Town Morn" (John Lees) – 4:48
3. "Summer Soldier" (Lees) – 10:28

=== Side two ===
4. "Thank You" (Lees) – 4:24
5. "One Hundred Thousand Smiles Out" (Holroyd) – 6:05
6. "Moonwater" (Woolly Wolstenholme) – 7:30

=== Bonus tracks ===
The album was remastered and reissued by Harvest in 2002 with bonus tracks:

7. "Child of Man" (single B-side) (Lees) – 3:21
8. "I'm Over You" (single A-side) (Lees) – 3:53
9. "When the City Sleeps" (single B-side)† (Lester Forest) – 4:16
10. "Breathless" (single A-side)† (Terry Bull) – 3:09
11. "Thank You" (alternative version)▲ (Lees) – 4:27
12. "Medicine Man" (single version) (Lees) – 4:29
13. "Rock and Roll Woman" (Holroyd) – 3:18
14. "The Joker" (Holroyd/Lees) – 3:32
15. "Child of Man" (BBC session 15 March 1972)▲ (Lees) – 3:37
16. "Moonwater" (2002 remix) (Wolstenholme) – 7:20

† originally released under the pseudonym "Bombadil"
▲ previously unreleased

== Personnel ==
- John Lees – vocals (2, 3, 4), guitars, sound effects
- Les Holroyd – vocals (1, 5), bass, piano, organ, mellotron, acoustic guitar
- Stuart "Woolly" Wolstenholme – piano, organ, mellotron, vocals (6), bells, tam-tam
- Mel Pritchard – drums, percussion
