= Face to Face (Barclay James Harvest album) =

Studio album by Barclay James Harvest
- Released: 30 January 1987 (original version); 23 October 2006 (remastered CD)
- Recorded: autumn 1986
- Studios: Friarmere Studios, Delph, Chipping Norton Studios
- Genres: Progressive rock, new wave, pop rock
- Length: 60:45 (original CD version); 76:47 (2006 remastered CD)
- Labels: Polydor Records; Eclectic Discs
- Producers: Barclay James Harvest & Gregg Jackman

Barclay James Harvest chronology
Victims of Circumstance (1984)	Face to Face (1987)	Welcome to the Show (1990)

Professional ratings
Review scores
Source	Rating
Allmusic	1.5/5 stars

Face to Face is the fourteenth studio album by British rock band Barclay James Harvest, released in 1987.

The working title for the album whilst recording was in progress was Elements, but there was a last-minute change to Face to Face.

== Track listing ==
=== Original LP version ===
Side one
No.	Title	Writer(s)	Length
1.	"Prisoner of Your Love"	Les Holroyd	4:34
2.	"He Said Love"	John Lees	5:03
3.	"Alone in the Night"	Lees	5:05
4.	"Turn the Key"	Holroyd	4:46
5.	"Guitar Blues"	Lees	5:24

Side two
No.	Title	Writer(s)	Length
6.	"African"	Lees	5:55
7.	"Following Me"	Holroyd	4:23
8.	"All My Life"	Holroyd	5:09
9.	"Panic"	Lees	4:30
10.	"Kiev"	Holroyd	5:25

=== Original CD version ===
No.	Title	Writer(s)	Length
1.	"Prisoner of Your Love"	Holroyd	4:35
2.	"He Said Love"	Lees	5:04
3.	"Alone in the Night"	Lees	5:07
4.	"Turn the Key"	Holroyd	4:47
5.	"You Need Love"	Lees	4:10
6.	"Kiev"	Holroyd	5:26
7.	"African"	Lees	5:51
8.	"Following Me"	Holroyd	4:22
9.	"All My Life"	Holroyd	5:31
10.	"Panic"	Lees	4:30
11.	"Guitar Blues"	Lees	5:18
12.	"On the Wings of Love"	Holroyd	5:56
Total length:			60:45

=== 2006 Eclectic ECLCD 1051 remastered CD bonus tracks ===
No.	Title	Writer(s)	Length
13.	"He Said Love (single edit)"	Lees	4:15
14.	"Panic (12-inch single remix)"	Lees	6:05
15.	"On the Wings of Love (single edit)"	Holroyd	5:31
Total length:			76:47

== Personnel ==
=== Barclay James Harvest ===
- Les Holroyd – bass, keyboards, guitars, vocals
- John Lees – guitars, vocals
- Mel Pritchard – drums, percussion

=== Guest musicians ===
Additional keyboards were by Kevin McAlea, Bias Boshell and Paul Wickens. The string arrangement on "Guitar Blues" was written and performed by Andrew Jackman. Dick Morrissey played saxophone. Additional percussion came from Frank Ricotti. Finally, the backing vocalists on "African" were George Chandler, Richard Jon Smith, Jimmy Chambers, Lee Vanderbilt, Bill Fredericks and Jimmy Thomas.

=== Production ===
- Produced by Barclay James Harvest & Gregg Jackman except tracks "Prisoner of Your Love", "Turn the Key", "African", "Following Me", "All My Life" and "Kiev" produced by Pip Williams, Gregg Jackman and Barclay James Harvest
- Engineered by Gregg Jackman and assisted by Richard Bland
- Recorded at John Lees's own Friarmere Studios in Delph, with additional keyboard and percussion overdubs added at Chipping Norton Studios, autumn 1986
- Mixed at Mayfair Studios and Advision Studios in London
- Sleeve design by Green Ink under the art direction of Alwyn Clayden

== Charts ==
Chart (1987)	Peak position
UK Albums Chart	65
German Albums Chart	9
