= Oh Babe, What Would You Say =

Single by Hurricane Smith
- B-side: "Getting to Know You"
- Released: 30 March 1972 (UK); July 1972 (US)
- Recorded: 1972
- Genre: Pop rock
- Length: 3:33
- Label: Capitol
- Songwriter: Eileen Sylvia Smith
- Producer: Hurricane Smith

Hurricane Smith singles chronology
"Don't Let It Die" (1971)	"Oh Babe, What Would You Say" (1972)	"Who Was It?" (1973)

Official audio
- "Oh Babe, What Would You Say" on YouTube

"Oh Babe, What Would You Say" is a song by UK record producer Hurricane Smith, written by his wife Eileen Sylvia Smith, and released in the UK by EMI on its Columbia label in March 1972 and in the US by Capitol Records, also in March 1972. It was a transatlantic hit, becoming a US No. 1 Cash Box and a Billboard Pop No. 3 hit, No. 3 in the Canadian RPM Magazine chart, and No. 4 in the UK Singles Chart.

== Charts ==
=== Weekly charts ===
Chart (1972–1973)	Peak position
Australia	13
Canada RPM Top Singles	3
Ireland (IRMA)	10
New Zealand (Listener)	9
UK	4
US Billboard Hot 100	3
US Billboard Adult Contemporary	2
US Cash Box Top 100	1

=== Year-end charts ===
Chart (1972)	Rank
UK	48

Chart (1973)	Rank
Australia	74
Canada	36
US Billboard Hot 100	57
US Cash Box Top 100	31

The song is noted for its alto saxophone solo, played by Frank Hardcastle, which is heard in the intro, the middle instrumental section, and the outro before the song's fade. The arrangement is in the style of the 1930s popular song genre. Its sentimental lyrics include the line: "Just to walk with you along the Milky Way".

== See also ==
- List of 1970s one-hit wonders in the United States
