= Who Was It? =

Single by Hurricane Smith

from the album Hurricane Smith
- Released: 1972
- Recorded: 1972
- Genre: Pop
- Length: 2:59
- Label: Capitol Records
- Songwriter: Gilbert O'Sullivan
- Producer: Hurricane Smith

Hurricane Smith singles chronology
"Oh Babe, What Would You Say" (1972)	"Who Was It?" (1972)	"My Mother Was Her Name" (1973)

Music video
- "Who Was It" (TopPop, 1972) on YouTube

"Who Was It?" is a song by Gilbert O'Sullivan from his 1972 album Back to Front. A cover by Hurricane Smith reached No. 23 on the UK Singles Chart, No. 49 on the Billboard Hot 100, No. 9 on the New Zealand Listener Charts and No. 12 on the Dutch Top 40. Andy Williams recorded a cover of the song, which appeared on his album Solitaire / First Time Ever I Saw Your Face.
