= No Man's Land (Billy Joel song) =

1993 single by Billy Joel

Single by Billy Joel

from the album River of Dreams
- B-side: "No Man's Land" (live)
- Released: 1993
- Length: 4:48
- Label: Columbia
- Songwriter: Billy Joel
- Producers: Billy Joel; Danny Kortchmar

Billy Joel singles chronology
"The River of Dreams" (1993)	"No Man's Land" (1993)	"All About Soul" (1993)

Music video
- "No Man's Land (Audio)" on YouTube

"No Man's Land" is a song by American singer-songwriter Billy Joel, released in February 1994 by Columbia Records as the second single and opening track from his twelfth studio album, River of Dreams (1993). The song, both written and co-produced by Joel, is about the growth of suburbia and its negative environmental and social aspects. It was performed by Joel on the premiere episode of Late Show with David Letterman on August 30, 1993. The song peaked at number 18 on the US Billboard Album Rock Tracks chart.

In 2017, Joel performed the song in concert as part of the story line in the Thanksgiving episode of the sixth season of the TV series Arrow. In 2018, he recalled the song as containing his best lyrics, with "biblical imagery skewed by consumerism". On the 1994 River of Dreams Tour, Joel often opened concerts with "No Man's Land".

== Critical reception ==
Pan-European magazine Music & Media wrote, "Woken up after his own 'Lullaby', Joel immediately puts on his rocking shoes. ACE programmers, for whom he is a core artist, don't panic! Lead guitar is only used for fill ins."

== Track listings ==
All songs were written by Billy Joel.

- UK CD single
1. "No Man's Land" (LP version) – 4:45
2. "No Man's Land" (live) – 5:03

== Charts ==
Chart (1993–1994)	Peak position
Canada Top Singles (RPM)	71
Netherlands (Single Top 100 Tipparade)	11
Spain (Top 40 Radio)	38
UK Singles (Official Charts)	50
US Mainstream Rock (Billboard)	18
