= Norman Smith (music producer) =

British recording engineer, producer (1923–2008)

Background information
- Also known as: Hurricane Smith
- Born: 22 February 1923; Edmonton, Middlesex, England
- Died: 3 March 2008 (aged 85) East Sussex, England
- Genres: Jazz
- Occupations: Record producer; recording engineer; singer; musician
- Instruments: Piano; drums; trumpet; vocals
- Years active: 1959−2007

Norman Smith (22 February 1923 – 3 March 2008) was an English musician, record producer and engineer. In the 1960s, he notably engineered all of the Beatles' EMI studio recordings up to the end of 1965 and produced three Pink Floyd albums including their first, The Piper at the Gates of Dawn (1967). He later had a successful recording career as Hurricane Smith, achieving a transatlantic hit single with "Oh Babe, What Would You Say" in 1972.

== Early life ==
Smith was born in Edmonton, Middlesex, and served as an RAF glider pilot during World War II. He began pursuing his interest in music after the war, playing drums and piano with several trad jazz combos. After an unsuccessful career as a jazz trumpeter and struggling as a session pianist and drummer, He joined EMI as an apprentice sound engineer in 1959.

== Career as producer and engineer ==
Smith was the engineer on all of the EMI studio recordings by the Beatles until the autumn of 1965, when EMI promoted him from engineer to producer. The last Beatles album he engineered was Rubber Soul. Smith engineered the sound for almost 100 Beatles songs.

As a reference to Smith's amiable and calm demeanor, John Lennon bestowed upon him the nickname of "Normal" and eventually Smith referenced this directly in the title of his self-published autobiography.

While working with the Beatles on 17 June 1965, he was offered £15,000 by the band's music publishing company, Dick James Music, to sell outright "Don't Let It Die", a song he had written.

In early 1967, he began working with Pink Floyd, producing their first, second and fourth studio albums: The Piper at the Gates of Dawn, A Saucerful of Secrets and Ummagumma. During the sessions for the song "Remember a Day", drummer Nick Mason became agitated that he could not come up with the right drum part for the song. Smith, however, knew what he wanted with the drums, so he played the part himself. Smith additionally contributed backing vocals to their song "Paint Box" in what engineer Ken Scott described as Smith's "entry into singing on record".

In 1968, Smith produced one of the first rock concept albums, The Pretty Things' S. F. Sorrow.

He produced early recordings by Barclay James Harvest, including their album Once Again (1971), and many years later was name-checked in John Lees' song "John Lennon's Guitar".

== Recording career as "Hurricane Smith" ==
In 1971, Smith, using a recording artist pseudonym of Hurricane Smith, had a UK No. 2 hit with "Don't Let It Die". This recording was a demo of a song that he had written with the hope that John Lennon would record it. When he played it for fellow record producer Mickie Most, Most was impressed enough to tell him to release it as it was. In 1972, he enjoyed a transatlantic hit with "Oh Babe, What Would You Say", which became a US No. 1 Cash Box and a Billboard Pop No. 3 hit. It reached No. 4 in the UK Singles Chart. Also included on Smith's self-titled debut album was a third hit single, a cover version of Gilbert O'Sullivan's "Who Was It?" (UK No. 23).

Some recordings followed, such as "My Mother Was Her Name" (1972), "Beautiful Day, Beautiful Night" (1973) and "To Make You My Baby" (1974). However, his subsequent attempts at producing successful recordings proved elusive. Capitalising on his solo recording efforts, Smith undertook two tours of the then thriving north of England cabaret circuit, complete with band and dancers. Smith enlisted the help of session drummer Peter Boita who "fixed" a band for Smith which was mostly made up of the temporarily disbanded Bob Miller and the Millermen band. This line-up went on to record the last album Smith made for EMI Records, Razzmahtazz Shall Inherit The Earth, which was released in 1973.

Smith also recorded an instrumental track, entitled "Theme From an Unmade Silent Movie", which the West Midlands based radio presenter Tony Butler adopted as his theme music, playing it frequently on his sports show in an attempt, often successful, to encourage the region's local football teams to score a goal. Fans of Aston Villa F.C. also consider this tune as their unofficial club theme, and it can often be heard played at Villa Park during the pre-match and half-time intervals. It was performed by the City of Birmingham Symphony Orchestra on 6 June 2008.

In 2004, Smith released a new CD, From Me to You (SFMCD030), featuring new recordings of his biggest self-penned hits, "Don't Let It Die" and "Oh Babe, What Would You Say". Included in the liner notes were messages from Sir Paul McCartney and members of Pink Floyd.

In 2011, a snippet of Smith's "Don't Let It Die" was included in the soundtrack of Tomas Alfredson's 2011 film adaptation of John le Carré's Tinker Tailor Soldier Spy.

== Memoir ==
Smith wrote a memoir, entitled John Lennon Called Me Normal. It debuted on 16 March 2007 as a limited edition at The Fest For Beatles Fans in Secaucus, New Jersey. There, Smith appeared and sang "Oh Babe". The book contains never-before published pictures, newly revealed historical facts about the Beatles and Pink Floyd at Abbey Road Studios, as well as details of Smith's life as an RAF glider pilot.

== Death ==
Smith died in March 2008, in East Sussex, England, aged 85.

== Singles discography ==
List of singles, with chart positions
Year	Title	Peak chart positions					
Year	Title	UK	AUS	IRE	NZ	RSA	USA
1971	"Don't Let It Die"	2	54	9	8	14	-
1972	"Oh, Babe, What Would You Say?"	4	13	10	9	-	3
1973	"Who Was It?"	23	30	-	-	-	49
1973	"My Mother Was Her Name"	-	95	-	-	-	-

== See also ==
- List of 1970s one-hit wonders in the United States
