= Made in England Tour =

1995 concert tour by Elton John

- Tour by Elton John
- Location: Europe • North America • South America
- Associated album: Made in England
- Start date: 20 May 1995
- End date: 25 November 1995
- Legs: 3
- No. of shows: 77 in total

Elton John concert chronology
- Face to Face 1995 (1995); Made in England Tour (1995); Big Picture Tour (1997–98)

On the back of the success of the album, Made in England, Elton John went out on tour to promote it. The 1995 leg of the tour covered fifteen European countries, but strangely missing out John's homeland of the United Kingdom. John with his band then crossed the Atlantic Ocean for an extensive tour of the United States, playing forty-two concerts in just under three months, including seven sold out concerts at New York City's legendary Madison Square Garden, which has become a staple venue for any Elton John tour.

== Tour dates ==
Date	City	Country	Venue
Europe
20 May 1995	Liévin	France	Stade Couvert Régional
21 May 1995 (Note: Part of Maaspop Festival.)	Rotterdam	Netherlands	Mullerpier
23 May 1995	Leipzig	Germany	Messehalle
25 May 1995	Vienna	Austria	Rathausplatz
27 May 1995	Zürich	Switzerland	Hallenstadion
28 May 1995	Zürich	Switzerland	Hallenstadion
30 May 1995	Bologne	Italy	Palasport
31 May 1995	Pordenone	Italy	Pordenone Parco Galvani
2 June 1995	Brussels	Belgium	Heysel Exhibition Center
3 June 1995	Marne-la-Vallée	France	Disneyland Paris
4 June 1995	Nancy	France	Zenith De Nancy
6 June 1995	Moscow	Russia	Kremlin Palace
7 June 1995	Moscow	Russia	Kremlin Palace
9 June 1995	Stockholm	Sweden	The Globe
11 June 1995	Oslo	Norway	Oslo Spektrum
14 June 1995	Oslo	Norway	Oslo Spektrum
16 June 1995	Copenhagen	Denmark	Forum Copenhagen
17 June 1995	Hamburg	Germany	Lüneburg
18 June 1995	Poznań	Poland	Poznań Stadium
20 June 1995	Berlin	Germany	Waldbühne
22 June 1995	Hamburg	Germany	Trabrennbahn Bahrenfeld
24 June 1995	Frankfurt	Germany	Frankfurt Wald Stadium
25 June 1995	Düsseldorf	Germany	Rheinstadion
27 June 1995	Stuttgart	Germany	Hanns-Martin-Schleyer-Halle
28 June 1995	Lyon	France	Halle Tony Garnier
30 June 1995	Monte Carlo	Monaco	Sporting Club Concert Hall
1 July 1995	Monte Carlo	Monaco	Sporting Club Concert Hall
2 July 1995	Munich	Germany	Olympiahalle
4 July 1995	Pamplona	Spain	Reyno de Navarra Stadium
5 July 1995	Nîmes	France	Antic Arena
7 July 1995	Bielefeld	Germany	Seidenstickerhalle
9 July 1995 (Note: Part of Out in the Green.)	Frauenfeld	Switzerland	Pferderennbahn
North America
4 August 1995	Raleigh	United States	Walnut Creek Amphitheater
5 August 1995	Bristow	United States	Nissan Pavilion
6 August 1995	Charlotte	United States	Blockbuster Pavilion
9 August 1995	Burgettstown	United States	Star Lake Amphitheater
11 August 1995	Camden	United States	Blockbuster Sony Center
12 August 1995	Camden	United States	Blockbuster Sony Center
13 August 1995	Hartford	United States	Meadows Music Theatre
16 August 1995	Mansfield	United States	Great Woods Center
18 August 1995	Mansfield	United States	Great Woods Center
19 August 1995	Mansfield	United States	Great Woods Center
20 August 1995	Columbia	United States	Merriweather Post Pavilion
24 August 1995	Chicago	United States	United Center
25 August 1995	Chicago	United States	United Center
26 August 1995	Columbus	United States	Polaris Amphitheater
29 August 1995	Cincinnati	United States	Riverbend Music Center
30 August 1995	Maryland Heights	United States	Riverport Amphitheatre
1 September 1995	Atlanta	United States	Lakewood Amphitheater
2 September 1995	Atlanta	United States	Lakewood Amphitheater
7 September 1995	Portland	United States	Memorial Coliseum
8 September 1995	Vancouver	Canada	Pacific Coliseum
9 September 1995	Tacoma	United States	Tacoma Dome
10 September 1995	Tacoma	United States	Tacoma Dome
15 September 1995	Mountain View	United States	Shoreline Amphitheatre
16 September 1995	Mountain View	United States	Shoreline Amphitheatre
18 September 1995	Salt Lake City	United States	Delta Center
22 September 1995	Los Angeles	United States	Hollywood Bowl
23 September 1995	Los Angeles	United States	Hollywood Bowl
26 September 1995	Bonner Springs	United States	Sandstone Amphitheater
28 September 1995	Milwaukee	United States	Bradley Center
29 September 1995	Minneapolis	United States	Target Center
2 October 1995	Montreal	Canada	Montreal Forum
3 October 1995	Montreal	Canada	Montreal Forum
6 October 1995	Auburn Hills	United States	The Palace of Auburn Hills
7 October 1995	Auburn Hills	United States	The Palace of Auburn Hills
8 October 1995	Cleveland	United States	Gund Arena
12 October 1995	New York City	United States	Madison Square Garden
13 October 1995	New York City	United States	Madison Square Garden
14 October 1995	New York City	United States	Madison Square Garden
17 October 1995	New York City	United States	Madison Square Garden
19 October 1995	New York City	United States	Madison Square Garden
20 October 1995	New York City	United States	Madison Square Garden
South America
3 November 1995	Buenos Aires	Argentina	Estadio Monumental
7 November 1995	Santiago	Chile	Estadio Nacional de Chile
14 November 1995	Caracas	Venezuela	La Rinconada Hippodrome
16 November 1995	Bogotá	Colombia	El Campín
North America
18 November 1995	San José	Costa Rica	Estadio Alejandro Morera Soto
South America
20 November 1995	Montevideo	Uruguay	Estadio Gran Parque Central
22 November 1995	Santiago	Chile	Estadio Nacional
24 November 1995	São Paulo	Brazil	Estádio do Ibirapuera
25 November 1995	Rio de Janeiro	Brazil	Estádio da Gávea

== Setlists ==
Standard European setlist
1. Someone Saved My Life Tonight
2. I Guess That's Why They Call It the Blues
3. I Don't Wanna Go On with You Like That
4. Sacrifice
5. Dixie Lily
6. Honky Cat
7. Come Down in Time
8. House
9. Simple Life
10. The One
11. Take Me to the Pilot
12. Made in England
13. Funeral for a Friend/Love Lies Bleeding
14. Rocket Man
15. Can You Feel the Love Tonight
16. Lies
17. Candle in the Wind
18. Believe
19. Pain
20. Saturday Night's Alright for Fighting
21. Pinball Wizard
22. Don't Let the Sun Go Down on Me
23. Bennie and the Jets
24. The Last Song
Standard North American setlist
1. I'm Still Standing
2. I Guess That's Why They Call It the Blues
3. I Don't Wanna Go On with You Like That
4. Sacrifice
5. Dixie Lily
6. Honky Cat
7. Come Down in Time
8. Blessed
9. Simple Life
10. The One
11. Take Me to the Pilot
12. Made in England
13. Someone Saved My Life Tonight
14. Don't Let the Sun Go Down on Me
15. Bennie and the Jets
16. Candle in the Wind
17. Levon
18. Rocket Man
19. Can You Feel the Love Tonight
20. Believe
21. Pain
22. Saturday Night's Alright for Fighting
23. Pinball Wizard
24. The Bitch Is Back
25. Your Song
26. Funeral for a Friend/Love Lies Bleeding
27. The Last Song

== Box office score data ==
Venue	City	Tickets Sold / Available	Gross Revenue
Walnut Creek Amphitheater	Raleigh	19,998 / 19,998	$523,105
Star Lake Amphitheater	Burgettstown	21,412 / 21,412	$542,684
Blockbuster Sony Center	Camden	45,455 / 45,455	$1,099,628
Riverbend Music Center	Cincinnati	16,325 / 16,325	—N/a
Riverport Amphitheatre	Maryland Heights	19,949 / 19,949	$608,692
Pacific Coliseum	Vancouver	16,053 / 16,053	$583,599
Hollywood Bowl	Los Angeles	34,543 / 34,543	$1,398,172
Target Center	Minneapolis	19,010 / 19,010	$605,401
Montreal Forum	Montreal	29,925 / 32,000	$929,393
The Palace of Auburn Hills	Auburn Hills	34,511 / 34,511	$1,191,455
Madison Square Garden	New York City	91,134 / 91,134	$3,530,399
Total		348,315 / 350,390(99%)	$11,012,528

== Personnel ==
- Elton John – piano and vocals
- Davey Johnstone – musical director, electric and acoustic guitars, banjo, mandolin, backing vocals
- Guy Babylon – keyboards, backing vocals
- Bob Birch – bass guitar, backing vocals
- Ray Cooper – percussion, spoken vocal on percussion solo
- John Jorgenson – electric and acoustic guitars, saxophone, backing vocals
- Charlie Morgan – drums
- David Paton – fill-in bass guitar
