= Ramases =

British musician (1934–1976)

- Born: Kimberley Barrington Frost; 1 January 1934; Sheffield, England
- Died: 2 December 1976 (aged 42) Sheffield, England
- Genres: Psychedelic rock

Ramases, born Kimberley Barrington Frost (1 January 1934 – 2 December 1976), was a British psychedelic musician who released two cult albums in the early 1970s.

== Biography ==
Barrington Frost was, anecdotally, born sometime between 1935 and 1940 in Sheffield, England, although Sheffield City birth records indicate that his birth date was January 1, 1934. He was the only child of musical parents (his mother played piano to silent movies in the local theatre, and his father was a tenor) and grew up singing and playing guitar from an early age. Barrington was drafted into the RAF, and eventually rose to become an army PT instructor. After completing his service, in 1960 he met and three weeks later married Dorothy Laflin (1957 carnival queen of Felixstowe), who was working in her parents' Felixstowe restaurant at the time. The couple settled in London, where he worked as a jazz singer by night and an HVAC installer by day, while Dorothy waited tables. His central heating employer offered him the opportunity to open a branch in Edinburgh, Scotland, but then went bankrupt shortly after so the Frosts stayed in Scotland and built up their own successful HVAC business in Glasgow.

=== Ramases ===
The Frosts relocated to Sheffield in 1966 and remodeled their home in a Roman style. Barrington shaved his head and began dressing eccentrically in silk robes. In 1968, the story goes, during a drive to visit a client he was visited by the Egyptian Pharaoh Ramesses who told him he was the Pharaoh's reincarnation, and he must take up the Pharaoh's message in a musical career.

Several early singles (recorded with his wife, whom he renamed Selket or Seleka) failed to make any impact. In 1971, Harvey Lisberg signed Ramases to Vertigo Records, and recorded the album Space Hymns at Strawberry Studios in Stockport, backed by Eric Stewart, Graham Gouldman, Kevin Godley and Lol Creme, who would shortly after form the band 10cc. The cover art for Space Hymns, created by artist Roger Dean from a detailed rough sketch made by Ramases, is an expansive six-panel fold out cover depicting what, at first, appears to be a rocket lifting off into the cosmos, and is revealed upon folding out the full image to be a church steeple (St. George's Church in Stockport). On the other side in infrared colour Ramases and Sel are shown holding aloft strands of wheat in a Demeter-like pose from the Eleusinian Mysteries. The lyrics deliver the same confident message. (Note: many sources erroneously report that Ramases' real name was Martin Raphael, who was actually only the sitar player on Space Hymns.)

Ramases's second album, Glass Top Coffin, was recorded at Phonogram Studios in 1975 in London, but Ramases was unhappy with the strings and chorus which were added post-production without his permission, and he was unhappy with the cover. The album did not sell well. Ramases and Selket left London and returned to the country of Felixstowe Ferry. A third album, to be titled Sky Lark or The Sky Lark, got as far as cassette demos, but Ramases became increasingly despondent and on 2 December 1976, aged 42, he took his own life. His death was not widely reported in musical circles until the early 1990s, and by then much of the Ramases history including the Sky Lark demos had been burned by Selket's jealous second husband.

In 2014, actor (and Ramases fan) Peter Stormare collected together (with the help of Selket and Harvey Lisberg) all of Ramases' surviving recordings, both released and unreleased, and compiled them into a six-disc boxed set.

In 2019, the Ramases song "Screw You" was featured on the soundtrack of the second season of British spy thriller television show Killing Eve.

In 2022, Ramases was honored by artist Tom Newell with the sculpture "Quasar One," named after the Ramases song, as part of the civic art project Bears of Sheffield.

== Discography ==
=== Singles ===
- "Crazy One" / "Mind's Eye" (As Ramases & Selket, published by CBS in 1968. The A-side is an earlier version of the song "Quasar One".)
- "Love You" / "Gold Is The Ring" (As Ramases & Seleka, published by Major Minor in 1970. "Love You" is sometimes listed as, and in some territories may have been issued as, "Screw You".)
- "Balloon" / "Muddy Water" (Published by Philips in 1971. Sometimes listed as Ballroom.)
- "Jesus Come Back" / "Hello Mister" (Philips, 1971)
- "Niño Viviente" ("Life Child", or, more accurately translated, "Living Child") / "Hola Señor" ("Hello Mister") (Vertigo, 1972, Chile)

=== Albums ===
- Space Hymns (Vertigo 6360046, 1971)
- Glass Top Coffin (Vertigo 6360115, 1975)
- Ramases Complete Discography (Stormvox Records, 2014) – includes both above albums, plus two discs of outtakes, a disc of singles and a disc of tribute tracks
