= Barclay James Harvest and Other Short Stories =

Studio album by Barclay James Harvest
- Released: 5 November 1971
- Recorded: 18 July – 16 August 1971
- Studio: Maida Vale Studios, London; Abbey Road Studios, London
- Genre: Progressive rock; art rock; symphonic rock
- Length: 40:33 (original LP); 1:10:50 (2002 CD)
- Label: Harvest
- Producer: Barclay James Harvest; Wally Allen

Barclay James Harvest chronology
Once Again (1971)	Barclay James Harvest and Other Short Stories (1971)	Baby James Harvest (1972)

Professional ratings
Review scores
Source	Rating
AllMusic	4/5 stars

Barclay James Harvest and Other Short Stories is the third album by English progressive rock band Barclay James Harvest, released in 1971. The band has been said to be "dabbling in symphonic rock" with this album.

== Track listing ==
=== Side one ===
1. "Medicine Man" (John Lees) – 3:58
2. "Someone There You Know" (Les Holroyd/Lees/Mel Pritchard/Woolly Wolstenholme) – 3:49
3. "Harry's Song" (Lees) – 3:55
4. "Ursula (The Swansea Song)" (Holroyd/Lees/Pritchard/Wolstenholme) – 2:55
5. "Little Lapwing" (Holroyd) – 4:59

=== Side two ===
6. "Song With No Meaning" (Holroyd) – 4:23
7. "Blue John's Blues" (Lees) – 6:50
8. "The Poet" (Wolstenholme) – 4:55
9. "After the Day" (Lees) – 4:49

=== Bonus tracks ===
The album was remastered and reissued by Harvest in 2002 with bonus tracks:

10. "Brave New World" (demo 17 July 1971) (Lees/Wolstenholme) – 3:59
11. "She Said"† (Lees) – 8:42
12. "Galadriel"† (Lees) – 3:07
13. "Ursula (The Swansea Song)"† (Holroyd/Lees/Pritchard/Wolstenholme) – 2:54
14. "Someone There You Know"† (Holroyd/Lees/Pritchard/Wolstenholme) – 3:47
15. "Medicine Man" (BBC session 15 March 1972) (Lees) – 7:48

† BBC session 5 July 1971, previously unreleased

== Personnel ==
- John Lees – vocals (1, 3, 7), guitars, percussion
- Les Holroyd – vocals (5, 6), bass, piano, acoustic guitar
- Stuart "Woolly" Wolstenholme – mellotron, organ, vocals (2, 4, 8, 9), guitars
- Mel Pritchard – drums, percussion, congas, effects

== Remastered version ==
A remastered version was released in 2020.
