= Lullabye (Goodnight, My Angel) =

1994 single by Billy Joel

Single by Billy Joel

from the album River of Dreams
- B-side: "Two Thousand Years"
- Released: February 21, 1994
- Genre: Pop; classical crossover
- Length: 3:34
- Label: Columbia
- Songwriter: Billy Joel
- Producers: Billy Joel; Danny Kortchmar

Billy Joel singles chronology
| "All About Soul" (1993) | "Lullabye (Goodnight, My Angel)" (1994) | "To Make You Feel My Love" (1997) |

Music video
- "Lullabye (Goodnight, My Angel)" on YouTube

"Lullabye (Goodnight, My Angel)" is a song by American singer-songwriter Billy Joel, released in February 1994 by Columbia Records as the fourth and final single from his 12th album, River of Dreams (1993). It was written and co-produced by Joel, inspired by Alexa Ray Joel, his daughter by Christie Brinkley. The song is in the key of G major. It peaked at number 27 on the Canadian RPM 100 Hit Tracks chart and number 77 on the US Billboard Hot 100. Its accompanying music video was directed by German director Marcus Nispel and shot in black-and-white, featuring Joel performing the song while playing on a piano.

In 2004, it was announced that Joel had agreed to write two children's books for Scholastic, the US publisher. The first book was titled Goodnight, My Angel (A Lullabye) and is a picture book based on the song and illustrated by Yvonne Gilbert. "Reassuring children that they are not alone or could be abandoned is very important for their well-being," Joel said in a statement in 2004. The second book was titled New York State of Mind and illustrated by Izak.

== Background ==
The song was originally written as a prelude to the song "The River of Dreams" in the style of a monophonic Gregorian chant. Joel had written English words in the chant describing a man who had lost his faith, and had then had the words translated into Latin. He changed his mind upon hearing the recording, and incorporated it into the song "River of Dreams". He later removed the interlude from the final studio version of "River of Dreams", and instead wrote lyrics to the melody that reflected his sentiment toward Alexa Ray, who was a young child at the time of writing. The version of "River of Dreams" incorporating "Lullabye" appeared as an alternate version on the box set My Lives, and on An Evening of Questions and Answers...& a Little Music.

== Critical reception ==
Larry Flick from Billboard magazine wrote, "This lovely, piano-based ballad is a humanistic hymn of the highest order, a natural stroke of inspirational songwriting. Joel's vocal is as strong as the melody, and the rich simplicity of the setting compounds the material's remarkable impact. This record exudes what every song programmed for radio longs to achieve: the power of an original moment that stops time in its tracks. Two million plays from now, it will still create a universal hush, first note to last." Dave Sholin from the Gavin Report described "Lullabye (Goodnight, My Angel)" as a "sweet and tender ballad that is bound to touch the hearts of all who hear it."

== Personnel ==
- Billy Joel – lead vocals, piano
- Lewis Del Gatto – orchestra manager
- Ira Newborn – orchestration

== Charts ==
=== Weekly charts ===
| Chart (1994) | Peak position |
|---|---|
| Canada Top Singles (RPM) | 27 |
| New Zealand (Recorded Music NZ) | 43 |
| US Billboard Hot 100 | 77 |
| US Adult Contemporary (Billboard) | 18 |

=== Year-end charts ===
| Chart (1994) | Position |
|---|---|
| US Adult Contemporary (Billboard) | 49 |

== Certifications ==
| Region | Certification | Certified units/sales |
|---|---|---|
| United States (RIAA) | Platinum | 1,000,000^{‡} |
^{‡} Sales+streaming figures based on certification alone.
