= Octoberon =

Studio album by Barclay James Harvest
- Released: 1 October 1976
- Recorded: Summer 1976
- Studios: Strawberry Studios, Marquee Studios
- Genres: Progressive rock, art rock, symphonic rock
- Length: 45:05
- Label: Polydor
- Producer: Barclay James Harvest

Barclay James Harvest chronology
Time Honoured Ghosts (1975)	Octoberon (1976)	Gone to Earth (1977)

Octoberon is the seventh studio album by Barclay James Harvest, released in 1976. The band had hoped that Elliot Mazer would again produce, but after hanging around in San Francisco for six weeks, they were forced to return home and produce it themselves.

A single was released containing a live version of "Rock 'n' Roll Star", and this gave the band an appearance on Top of the Pops. The song remained part of their live show to the end.

In 2003 a remastered CD was issued with five bonus tracks. In 2017 a 3-disc CD/DVD special edition was released. This features new stereo and surround mixes in addition to the remastered originals, plus the 2003 bonus tracks, one new bonus track, and two videos.

== Critical reception ==
Professional ratings
Review scores
Source	Rating
AllMusic	3/5 stars
The Rolling Stone Record Guide	1/5 stars
Sounds	3/5 stars

In the UK music magazine Sounds, Tim Lott expressed his frustration with the album, saying, "Unfortunately, Octoberon is no major departure from [their] disappointing formula. But despite that, there are some fine, imaginative moments which point once again to the never-fulfilled potential." A contemporary review of the album, appearing in a January 1977 issue of Billboard magazine, said that Octoberon "has delivered an extremely accessible spacey-but-lyrical LP in the most popular style of Pink Floyd or Yes. There is nothing harsh or cultish about this music." In another mixed review, AllMusic's Paul Collins wrote retrospectively that Octoberon lacks the harmonies evident in the band's earlier records, and that the album is "not up to the level of their best work, but worth a listen for fans."

== Track listing ==
Side one
No.	Title	Writer(s)	Length
1.	"The World Goes On"	Les Holroyd	6:30
2.	"May Day"	John Lees	7:58
3.	"Ra"	Woolly Wolstenholme	7:20
Total length:			21:48

Side two
No.	Title	Writer(s)	Length
4.	"Rock 'n' Roll Star"	Holroyd	5:17
5.	"Polk Street Rag"	Lees	5:38
6.	"Believe in Me"	Holroyd	4:23
7.	"Suicide?"	Lees	7:59
Total length:			23:17 (45:05)

=== 2003 remastered CD ===
As above, plus:
8. "Rock 'n' Roll Star" (early mix) - 4:53
9. "Polk Street Rag" (first mix) - 5:30
10. "Ra" (first mix)
11. "Rock 'n' Roll Star" (version recorded at Marquee Studios)
12. "Suicide?" (first mix)

=== 2017 remastered 3-disc set ===
==== Disc One (CD) ====
Tracks 1–7 as above, plus:
8. "Rock 'n' Roll Star" (first mix) - 4:53
9. "Polk Street Rag" (early mix) - 5:30
10. "Ra" (early mix)
11. "Suicide?" (early mix)
N.B. These appear to be the same mixes as tracks 8–10 & 12 on the 2003 CD, although the descriptions "first mix" and "early mix" have been swapped.

==== Disc Two (CD) ====
New stereo mixes of Tracks 1–7 as above, plus:
8. "Rock 'n' Roll Star" (Marquee Studios version for Top of the Pops)
9. "May Day" (alternate intro version)

==== Disc Three (DVD) ====
Audio content:
Three mixes of tracks 1–7 as above, plus track 9 on Disc Two: 5.1 surround mix, 96 kHz/24-bit new and original stereo mixes.
Video content:

1. "Rock 'n' Roll Star"
2. "The World Goes On"

(Polydor promotional films as broadcast on The Old Grey Whistle Test, 1 March 1977)

== Personnel ==
Barclay James Harvest

- John Lees - acoustic and electric guitars, vocals, harmonies
- Stuart "Woolly" Wolstenholme - keyboards, vocals
- Les Holroyd - bass, acoustic guitar, vocals, harmonies
- Mel Pritchard - drums, percussion

== Charts ==
Chart (1976)	Peak position
UK Albums (Official Charts)	19
German Albums	40
US Billboard 200	174

== Certifications ==
Region	Certification	Certified units/sales
United Kingdom (BPI)	Silver	60,000^{^}
^{^} Shipments figures based on certification alone.
