= Face to Face 1995 =

1995 concert tour by Elton John and Billy Joel

- Continental tour by Elton John and Billy Joel
- Poster to the concert in South Carolina, USA
- Location: North America
- Start date: 22 March 1995
- End date: 14 April 1995
- Legs: 1
- No. of shows: 12 in total
Elton John tour chronology
Face to Face 1994 (1994)	Face to Face 1995 (1995)	Made in England Tour (1995)
Billy Joel tour chronology
Face to Face 1994 (1994)	Face to Face 1995 (1995)	Face to Face 1998 (1998)

After the huge success of the previous year's Face to Face concerts Billy Joel and Elton John set out on the road again. They reunited for twelve concerts, visiting both the United States and Canada. They played in nine states or provinces.

The concerts took the same form as the previous year where John and Joel with their bands would perform a few songs together, then John would take to the stage with his band without Joel. Joel would then do his own set followed by a reunion on stage with John before leaving stage. They would return for a few songs for an encore.

Joel stated in 2012 that he would no longer tour with John because it restrains his setlists.

== Tour dates ==
Date	City	Country	Venue	Attendance	Revenue
North America
22 March 1995	San Diego	United States	Jack Murphy Stadium	52,665 / 52,665	$2,350,025
24 March 1995	Paradise	United States	MGM Grand Garden Arena	26,613 / 26,613	$2,763,825
25 March 1995	Paradise	United States	MGM Grand Garden Arena	26,613 / 26,613	$2,763,825
29 March 1995	Toronto	Canada	SkyDome	53,095 / 53,095	$1,955,286
31 March 1995	Indianapolis	United States	RCA Dome	41,452 / 41,452	$1,987,750
2 April 1995	Irving	United States	Texas Stadium		
5 April 1995	Houston	United States	Rice Stadium	45,960 / 45,960	$1,559,875
7 April 1995	Little Rock	United States	War Memorial Stadium	41,274 / 41,274	$1,616,025
9 April 1995	Clemson	United States	Memorial Stadium	59,579 / 59,579	$1,962,631
11 April 1995	Tampa	United States	Tampa Stadium	51,736 / 51,736	$1,526,850
13 April 1995	Miami Gardens	United States	Joe Robbie Stadium	103,694 / 103,694	$4,385,725
14 April 1995	Miami Gardens	United States	Joe Robbie Stadium	103,694 / 103,694	$4,385,725
Total				476,698 / 476,698	$20,107,992

== Setlist ==
Standard setlist

Elton John & Billy Joel

1. Your Song
2. Honesty
3. Don't Let the Sun Go Down on Me

Elton John & Band

1. Philadelphia Freedom
2. Take Me to the Pilot
3. Levon
4. Rocket Man
5. Simple Life
6. The One
7. New York State of Mind
8. Funeral for a Friend/Love Lies Bleeding
9. I Guess That's Why They Call It the Blues (with Billy Joel)
10. Can You Feel the Love Tonight
11. Saturday Night's Alright for Fighting
12. Pinball Wizard

Billy Joel & Band

1. I Go to Extremes
2. Pressure
3. With a Little Help from My Friends
4. Goodbye Yellow Brick Road
5. Scenes from an Italian Restaurant
6. My Life (with Elton John)
7. Lullabye
8. River of Dreams
9. We Didn't Start the Fire
10. It's Still Rock and Roll to Me
11. Big Shot

Elton John & Billy Joel

1. Bitch Is Back
2. You May Be Right
3. Bennie and the Jets

Encore

1. A Hard Day's Night
2. Lucille
3. Great Balls of Fire
4. Candle in the Wind
5. Piano Man
