= Ring of Changes =

Studio album by Barclay James Harvest
- Released: May 16, 1983 (original version); June 25, 2012 (remastered CD)
- Recorded: January - March 1983
- Studios: Far Studios, Frankfurt
- Genres: Progressive rock, new wave, pop rock
- Length: 48:10
- Labels: Polydor Records; Esoteric Recordings
- Producer: Pip Williams

Barclay James Harvest chronology
Turn of the Tide (1981)	Ring of Changes (1983)	Victims of Circumstance (1984)

Professional ratings
Review scores
Source	Rating
Allmusic	3/5 stars

Ring of Changes is the twelfth studio album by British rock band Barclay James Harvest, released in 1983.

== Track listing ==
Side one
No.	Title	Writer(s)	Length
1.	"Fifties Child"	John Lees	4:18
2.	"Looking from the Outside"	Les Holroyd	5:17
3.	"Teenage Heart"	Lees	4:30
4.	"High Wire"	Holroyd	5:04
5.	"Midnight Drug"	Lees	5:13

Side two
No.	Title	Writer(s)	Length
6.	"Waiting for the Right Time"	Holroyd	6:19
7.	"Just a Day Away (Forever Tomorrow)"	Lees	4:12
8.	"Paraiso Dos Cavalos"	Lees	5:51
9.	"Ring of Changes"	Holroyd	7:17
Total length:			48:10

2012 Esoteric ECLEC2332 remastered CD bonus tracks
No.	Title	Writer(s)	Length
10.	"Blow Me Down"	Lees	4:54
11.	"Waiting for the Right Time (edited and remixed version)"	Holroyd	3:27
12.	"Ring of Changes (single version)"	Holroyd	4:39

== Personnel ==
=== Barclay James Harvest ===
- Les Holroyd – bass, keyboards, guitars, vocals
- John Lees – guitars, vocals
- Mel Pritchard – drums, percussion

=== Guest musicians ===
"Special Guest Musician" on Ring of Changes was Bias Boshell, founder member of English folk band Trees, working with Barclay James Harvest for the first time. The orchestration on "Fifties Child" and "Paraiso Dos Cavalos" was arranged by Pip Williams and performed by the New World Philharmonic Orchestra conducted by David Katz. Kevin McAlea played keyboards on "Midnight Drug" and Henry Morris provided "occasional backing vocals".

=== Production ===
- Produced by Pip Williams
- Engineered by Gregg Jackman
- Recorded digitally at Far Studios, Frankfurt and mixed at RAK Studios, London
- Assistant engineer – Chris Dickie
- Mastered at Strawberry Mastering by Melvyn Abrahams
- Concept and design – Alwyn Clayden & David Walker
- Art direction and supervision – Alwyn Clayden
- Photography – Tony Latham, Alwyn Clayden & Bob Norris
- Creative assistance and artwork – Main Titles Associates
- Retouching – Wade Wood

== Charts ==
Chart (1983)	Peak position
UK Albums Chart	36
German Albums Chart	4
