= All About Soul =

1993 single by Billy Joel

Single by Billy Joel

from the album River of Dreams
- B-side: "You Picked a Real Bad Time"
- Released: October 11, 1993
- Length: 6:01 (album version); 4:15 (single version)
- Label: Columbia
- Songwriter: Billy Joel
- Producers: Danny Kortchmar; Joe Nicolo

Billy Joel singles chronology
"No Man's Land" (1993)	"All About Soul" (1993)	"Lullabye (Goodnight, My Angel)" (1994)

Music video
- "All About Soul" on YouTube

"All About Soul" is a song by American musician Billy Joel, released in October 1993 by Columbia Records as the third single from his 12th studio album, River of Dreams (1993). The single was produced by Danny Kortchmar and Joe Nicolo and features backing vocals by Color Me Badd. The song peaked at No. 29 in the United States and No. 32 in the United Kingdom, becoming his final top-40 single in either country.

The compilation box set My Lives contains an unfinished demo version of "All About Soul" called "Motorcycle Song". ""All About Soul" became the unofficial theme song of the New York Knicks during their run to the 1994 NBA Finals.

== Critical reception ==
Pan-European magazine Music & Media wrote, "Joel's river of songs is immeasurably deep. Once more he'll manage to get hordes of listeners humming along with a vintage species of his more uptempo side."

== B-side ==
The B-side is "You Picked a Real Bad Time", which did not appear on an album until the compilation box set My Lives was released in 2005.

== Track listing ==
- UK CD single
1. "All About Soul" (radio edit) – 4:15
2. "All About Soul" (remix) – 6:05
3. "All About Soul" (LP version) – 6:01
4. "You Picked a Real Bad Time" – 4:54

== Charts ==
=== Weekly charts ===
Chart (1993–1994)	Peak position
Australia (ARIA)	34
Canada Top Singles (RPM)	9
Canada Adult Contemporary (RPM)	5
Europe (Eurochart Hot 100)	83
Europe (European Hit Radio)	16
Germany (GfK)	51
Iceland (Íslenski Listinn Topp 40)	30
Netherlands (Single Top 100)	42
New Zealand (Recorded Music NZ)	22
Spain (Top 40 Radio)	27
UK Singles (Official Charts)	32
UK Airplay (Music Week)	26
US Billboard Hot 100	29
US Adult Contemporary (Billboard)	6
US Pop Airplay (Billboard)	17
US Cash Box Top 100	24

=== Year-end charts ===
Chart (1994)	Position
Canada Top Singles (RPM)	72
Canada Adult Contemporary (RPM)	57
US Adult Contemporary (Billboard)	27

== Release history ==
Region	Date	Format(s)	Label(s)	Ref.
United Kingdom	October 11, 1993	7-inch vinyl; CD; cassette	Columbia	
Australia	October 25, 1993	CD; cassette	Columbia	
Japan	November 26, 1993	Mini-CD	Sony	
