= River of Dreams =

Studio album by Billy Joel
- Released: August 10, 1993
- Studios: The Boathouse at the Island Boatyard (Shelter Island); Cove City Sound Studios (Glen Cove); The Hit Factory (New York City)
- Genre: Pop
- Length: 49:10
- Label: Columbia
- Producers: Dan Kortchmar; Billy Joel; Dave Thoener; Joe Nicolo

Billy Joel chronology
Souvenir: The Ultimate Collection (1990)	River of Dreams (1993)	Greatest Hits Volume III (1997)

A Voyage on the River of Dreams
- Australian 1994 box set cover

Singles from River of Dreams
- 1. "The River of Dreams" Released: July 1993; 2. "No Man's Land" Released: 1993; 3. "All About Soul" Released: October 1993; 4. "Lullabye (Goodnight, My Angel)" Released: March 1994

Professional ratings
Review scores
Source	Rating
AllMusic	2/5 stars
Calgary Herald	B+
Deseret News	(favorable)
Entertainment Weekly	(A−)
The Los Angeles Times	2/4 stars
The New York Times	(not rated)
Rolling Stone	4/5 stars

River of Dreams is the twelfth studio album by American singer-songwriter Billy Joel, released on August 10, 1993. River of Dreams presented a more serious tone than found in Joel's previous albums, dealing with issues such as trust and long-lasting love. It was rumored that the themes of trust and betrayal, particularly certain lyrics from the songs "A Minor Variation" and "The Great Wall of China", stem from Joel's legal disputes with his former manager and ex-brother-in-law, Frank Weber, who reportedly embezzled millions of dollars from Joel and used dubious accounting practices to cover it up. It was Joel's fourth and last album to reach number one on the Billboard 200 chart, a position it held for three consecutive weeks.

River of Dreams is the last rock album Joel has released to date, as his following album, Fantasies & Delusions (2001), features classical compositions with solo piano performed by Hyung-ki "Richard" Joo. However, Joel has continued to tour and record occasion pop/rock singles.

The album cover was a painting by Joel's then-wife, Christie Brinkley. In 1993, Rolling Stone gave her the Top Picks award for "The Best Album Cover of the Year". However, in 2024, Rolling Stone listed it last as one of "The 50 Worst Album Covers of All Time".

== Background ==
In the summer of 1992, Billy Joel held a series of writing and recording sessions on Shelter Island, New York; these sessions eventually produced seven tracks, self-produced by Joel.

Joel was dissatisfied with the results, and so, on the recommendation of Don Henley, he brought in session guitarist Danny Kortchmar for another take on the songs. Kortchmar agreed to produce, provided he be allowed to use session musicians on the recordings, to which Joel agreed. Only one song from the Shelter Island sessions, "Shades of Grey", would make the final album in its original produced form.

In a 2018 interview with Vulture, Joel expressed disappointment that the album did not yield any hit singles beyond the title track. He further attributed his decision to stop releasing pop albums to the lack of airplay. "The thing was, I put a lot of work into River of Dreams and it was as if the business had left me behind because there are substantial songs on that album that never went anywhere. So I said, 'What's the point of putting myself through writing and recording if it doesn't mean what it's supposed to mean out there in the world?'"

== Commercial performance ==
River of Dreams sold approximately 240,000 units in its first week.

== Track listing ==
All songs were written and composed by Billy Joel.

No.	Title	Length
1.	"No Man's Land"	4:48
2.	"The Great Wall of China"	5:45
3.	"Blonde Over Blue"	4:55
4.	"A Minor Variation"	5:36
5.	"Shades of Grey"	4:10
6.	"All About Soul"	6:10
7.	"Lullabye (Goodnight, My Angel)"	3:32
8.	"The River of Dreams"	4:05
9.	"Two Thousand Years"	5:19
10.	"Famous Last Words"	5:01
Total length:		49:10

== A Voyage on the River of Dreams ==
A Voyage on the River of Dreams is an Australian 3-CD box set released in 1994, which includes the studio album, River of Dreams, along with a 6-track live CD from the '93–'94 River of Dreams Tour, plus a Questions & Answers CD recorded at Princeton University. This box set made the charts in Australia (No. 33) and New Zealand (No. 47), the only places besides Japan where the set was officially released.

Disc one (River of Dreams – Studio album) – as per original album

Disc two (Billy Joel Live) All songs written and composed by Billy Joel, except where noted

1. "Goodbye Yellow Brick Road" (Elton John/Bernie Taupin) – 5:08
2. "No Man's Land" – 5:44
3. "The Ballad of Billy the Kid" – 5:52
4. "Lullabye (Goodnight, My Angel)" – 3:40
5. "The River of Dreams" – 5:28
6. "A Hard Day's Night" (Lennon–McCartney) – 3:20

Disc three (Questions & Answers Disc)

1. "Q & A recorded at Princeton University"

== Personnel ==
=== Musicians ===
- Billy Joel – lead vocals, clavinet (1, 4), Hammond organ (1, 2, 4, 6, 8–10), piano (2, 6–10), backing vocals (2), synthesizers (3, 8), keyboards (5)
- Jeff Jacobs – synthesizers (2), additional programming (8)
- Dan Kortchmar – guitars (1–4, 6, 8–10)
- Tommy Byrnes – guitars (1, 3, 5, 6)
- Leslie West – guitar (1, 2, 4)
- Corrado Sgandurra – guitar (1, 2)
- Mike Tyler – guitar (8)
- T.M. Stevens – bass (1, 2, 4, 6, 9, 10)
- Lonnie Hillyer – bass (3, 8)
- Schuyler Deale – bass (5)
- Jeff Lee Johnson – bass (8)
- Chuck Treece – bass (8)
- Zachary Alford – drums (1, 2, 3, 4, 6, 8)
- Liberty DeVitto – drums (5)
- Steve Jordan – drums (9, 10)
- Jim Saporito – percussion (2)
- Andy Kravitz – percussion (8)
- Arno Hecht – baritone saxophone (4)
- Richie Cannata – tenor saxophone (4)
- Osvaldo Melindez – trombone (4)
- Laurence Etkin – trumpet (4)
- Frank Simms – backing vocals (1, 2, 8)
- George Simms – backing vocals (1, 2, 8)
- Color Me Badd – guest vocals (6)
- Wrecia Ford – backing vocals (6, 8)
- Marlon Saunders – backing vocals (6, 8)
- Crystal Taliefero – backing vocals (6, 8), vocal arrangement (6, 8)
- B. David Witworth – backing vocals (6, 8)
- Curtis Rance King Jr. – choir conductor and contractor (6)
- Choir on "All About Soul" – Phillip Ballou, Katreese Barnes, Dennis Collins, Will Downing, Frank Floyd, Diane Garisto, Stephanie James, Devora Johnson, Marlon Saunders and Corliss Stafford
- Ira Newborn – orchestrations (2, 6–8)
- Lewis Del Gatto – orchestra manager (2, 6–8)

=== Technical ===
- Produced by Dan Kortchmar (1–4, 6–10) and Billy Joel (5)
- Mixed by Niko Bolas (1–4, 6, 7, 9, 10); Dave Thoener (5); Joe Nicolo and Phil Nicolo (8)
- Engineered by Carl Glanville (1–7, 9, 10); Joe Nicolo and Phil Nicolo (8)
- Additional production and mix – Dave Thoener (5)
- Co-produced by Joe Nicolo (8)
- Assistant engineers – Dan Hetzel and Brian Vibberts (1–7, 9, 10); Dirk Grobelny (8)
- Recorded by Jay Healy, Bradshaw Leigh, Bob Thrasher, and Dave Wilkerson
- Mastered by Ted Jensen at Sterling Sound (New York, NY)
- Production coordinator – Bill Zampino
- A&R – Don DeVito
- Art and commerce – Jeff Schock
- Technical support – Andrew Baker, Lester Baylinson, Steve Bramberg, Doug Kleeger, Jon "J.D." Dworkow, Dave Hofbauer, Larry DeMarco, Laura Delia, David Hewitt, Howie Mendelson, Greg Garland, Courtney Spencer, and Peter Goodrich
- Art direction – Christopher Austopchuk
- Design – Sara Rotman
- Photography – Glen Erler
- Cover art – Christie Brinkley

== Aftermath ==
River of Dreams stands as Billy Joel's most recent studio album of original material in the pop/rock genre. Joel has often stated that the album was designed to stand as his final record and that while he still composes music, he no longer writes within the pop/rock music vein and has no more interest in the recording industry. Joel's succeeding one-off studio album Fantasies & Delusions, released in 2001, was an instrumental album of classical piano pieces containing no pop songs whatsoever.

== Accolades ==
=== Grammy Awards ===
Year	Nominee / work	Award	Result
1994	River of Dreams	Album of the Year	Nominated
1994	"The River of Dreams"	Song of the Year	Nominated
1994	"The River of Dreams"	Record of the Year	Nominated
1994	"The River of Dreams"	Best Pop Vocal Performance – Male	Nominated

== Charts ==
=== Weekly charts ===
Weekly chart performance for River of Dreams
Chart (1993–94)	Peak position
Australian Albums (ARIA)	1
Austrian Albums (Ö3 Austria)	2
Canada Top Albums/CDs (RPM)	6
Danish Albums (IFPI)	8
Dutch Albums (Album Top 100)	23
European Albums (European Top 100 Albums)	6
Finnish Albums (Suomen virallinen lista)	21
German Albums (Offizielle Top 100)	2
Hungarian Albums (MAHASZ)	33
Icelandic Albums (Tónlist)	4
Irish Albums (IRMA)	8
Italian Albums (Musica e Dischi)	17
Japanese Albums (Oricon)	3
New Zealand Albums (RMNZ)	1
Norwegian Albums (VG-lista)	9
Spanish Albums (PROMUSICAE)	19
Swedish Albums (Sverigetopplistan)	30
Swiss Albums (Schweizer Hitparade)	2
UK Albums (Official Charts)	3
US Billboard 200	1
Zimbabwean Albums (ZIMA)	3

=== Year-end charts ===
1993 year-end chart performance for River of Dreams
Chart (1993)	Position
Australian Albums (ARIA)	7
Austrian Albums (Ö3 Austria)	14
Canada Top Albums/CDs (RPM)	27
Dutch Albums (MegaCharts)	89
European Albums (European Top 100 Albums)	27
German Albums (Offizielle Top 100)	21
Japanese Albums (Oricon)	79
New Zealand Albums (RIANZ)	18
Swiss Albums (Schweizer Hitparade)	17
UK Albums (OCC)	43
US Billboard 200	23

1994 year-end chart performance for River of Dreams
Chart (1994)	Position
Australian Albums (ARIA)	26
German Albums (Offizielle Top 100)	93
US Billboard 200	34

== Certifications and sales ==
Certifications and sales for River of Dreams
Region	Certification	Certified units/sales
Australia (ARIA)	3× Platinum	210,000^{^}
Austria (IFPI Austria)	Platinum	50,000^{*}
Canada (Music Canada)	3× Platinum	300,000^{^}
Germany (BVMI)	Platinum	500,000^{^}
Japan (RIAJ)	Platinum	241,000 (Note: Combined sales of standard edition and its expanded reissue.)
Netherlands (NVPI)	Gold	50,000
New Zealand (RMNZ)	Platinum	15,000^{^}
Sweden (GLF)	Gold	50,000^{^}
Switzerland (IFPI Switzerland)	Platinum	50,000^{^}
United Kingdom (BPI)	Platinum	300,000^{^}
United States (RIAA)	5× Platinum	5,000,000^{^}
^{*} Sales figures based on certification alone.^{^} Shipments figures based on certification alone.
