= Barclay James Harvest =

English progressive rock band

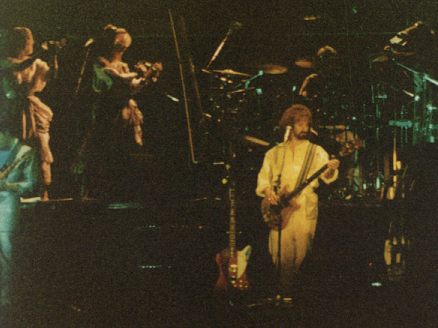
- Barclay James Harvest at Hammersmith Odeon, 1984

Background information
- Also known as: John Lees' Barclay James Harvest (since 1998); Barclay James Harvest featuring Les Holroyd (since 2002)
- Origin: Oldham, England
- Genres: Art rock; progressive rock; psychedelic rock; folk rock
- Years active: 1966–present
- Labels: Parlophone; Harvest; Polydor; Sire; MCA; Esoteric
- Members: John Lees' Barclay James Harvest; John Lees; Craig Fletcher; Kevin Whitehead; Jez Smith; Barclay James Harvest featuring Les Holroyd; Les Holroyd; Steve Butler; Michael Byron-Hehir; Ralf Gustke; Jens Skwirblies
- Past members: Barclay James Harvest; Les Holroyd; John Lees; Mel Pritchard; Stuart "Woolly" Wolstenholme
- Website: www.bjharvest.co.uk

Barclay James Harvest is an English progressive rock band which, following a split in 1998, now exist as two successor bands. They were founded in Oldham in September 1966 by bassist/vocalist Les Holroyd (born 1948), guitarist/vocalist John Lees (born 1947), drummer/percussionist Mel Pritchard (1948–2004), and keyboardist/vocalist Stuart "Woolly" Wolstenholme (1947–2010).

== History ==
Barclay James Harvest signed with EMI's Parlophone label in the UK for one single in early 1968 (entitled "Early Morning / Mr. Sunshine"), then moved to the more progressively inclined Harvest label. The name of the band, according to The International Barclay James Harvest Fan Club, signifies nothing specifically. Having exhausted other possibilities, each of the band members wrote single words on pieces of paper which were drawn out of a hat one by one. All were rejected until only three were left: James, a man who used to sing with the band, Harvest because they were living in a farmhouse, and Barclay after Barclays bank, because they aspired to make money. These were then rearranged to get the best-sounding name of Barclay James Harvest.

Their self-titled debut album featured backing by an orchestra organized by Robert John Godfrey. It was released in mid-1970 and was heavily touted by the musicians and the record label as the next big thing in orchestral rock, but met with overwhelmingly negative reviews and weak sales. Their second album, Once Again, was followed by a tour with a full orchestra under Godfrey's guidance. Godfrey departed over writing issues behind "Mocking Bird" – one of the group's most consistently popular tracks - so Martyn Ford was brought in to supervise the orchestral work for their third album, Barclay James Harvest and Other Short Stories. Years later Godfrey filed a lawsuit alleging he was owed composing credits and corresponding royalties on several of Barclay James Harvest's songs. By the release of their fourth album, Baby James Harvest, in 1972, the pressures of touring were beginning to affect the band.

After this album, they departed from EMI, moved management to Harvey Lisberg, and signed to Polydor; the move immediately resulted in greater sales. The next album, Everyone Is Everybody Else (1974) was voted 13th by listeners in Radio Caroline's 1977 Top 100 All Time Albums Chart. The band did a BBC Radio 1 session in 1974 for John Peel; Alan Freeman, however, would be the band's main champion on the station in the 1970s and again when he returned from 1989 to 1993. The double live album, Barclay James Harvest Live, which followed in late 1974, was the first to chart in the UK, reaching No. 40. Time Honoured Ghosts (1975), which has "Titles", recorded in the US, followed, and this too charted in the UK, reaching No. 32. Octoberon followed in 1976 and reached number 19 in the UK. They broke into the mainstream mainland European market with their 1977 set Gone to Earth, which contained the song "Poor Man's Moody Blues", a homage to the Moody Blues' song, "Nights in White Satin."

Wolstenholme – whose mellotron playing was a trademark of the band's sound in the 1970s – left in 1979 after the album XII (1978), as he began to suffer from clinical depression. He pursued a short solo career fronting the band Maestoso, before retiring from the music industry to farm. He remained inactive throughout the '80s before rejoining John Lees when BJH essentially split in two.

The remaining three members continued. In August 1980, they played a free concert in front of the Reichstag in West Berlin, with an estimated attendance of 250,000 people. They were the first Western rock band to perform in an open-air concert in East Germany (over two years before the Berlin Wall fell), playing in Treptower Park, East Berlin on 14 July 1987 to a 170,000-plus audience. The band continued as a trio with regular guest-musicians until 1998. One album, Welcome to the Show, produced in 1990, was released under the abbreviated name BJH; however, because of criticism from fans, the full name was restored, albeit with the inclusion of the BJH moniker.

In 1998, musical differences amongst members of BJH saw the band essentially split into two different groups, each of which retained "Barclay James Harvest" as part of its name. John Lees released an album mixing new songs and classics of the band, entitled Nexus, under the name "Barclay James Harvest Through the Eyes of John Lees". Woolly Wolstenholme played in (and composed for) this band, subsequently resurrecting Maestoso to record and tour with new material, as well as back-catalogue favourites. Les Holroyd and Mel Pritchard teamed up to record under the name "Barclay James Harvest featuring Les Holroyd". In 2006/7, Lees and Wolstenholme toured under the slightly modified band title "John Lees' Barclay James Harvest".

Mel Pritchard died suddenly of a heart attack in early 2004. Woolly Wolstenholme took his own life in December 2010, having apparently struggled with depression for many years. The two derivatives of Barclay James Harvest continue to record and tour to this day, and enjoy ongoing popularity, particularly in Germany, France, and Switzerland.

== John Lees' Barclay James Harvest (1998–) ==
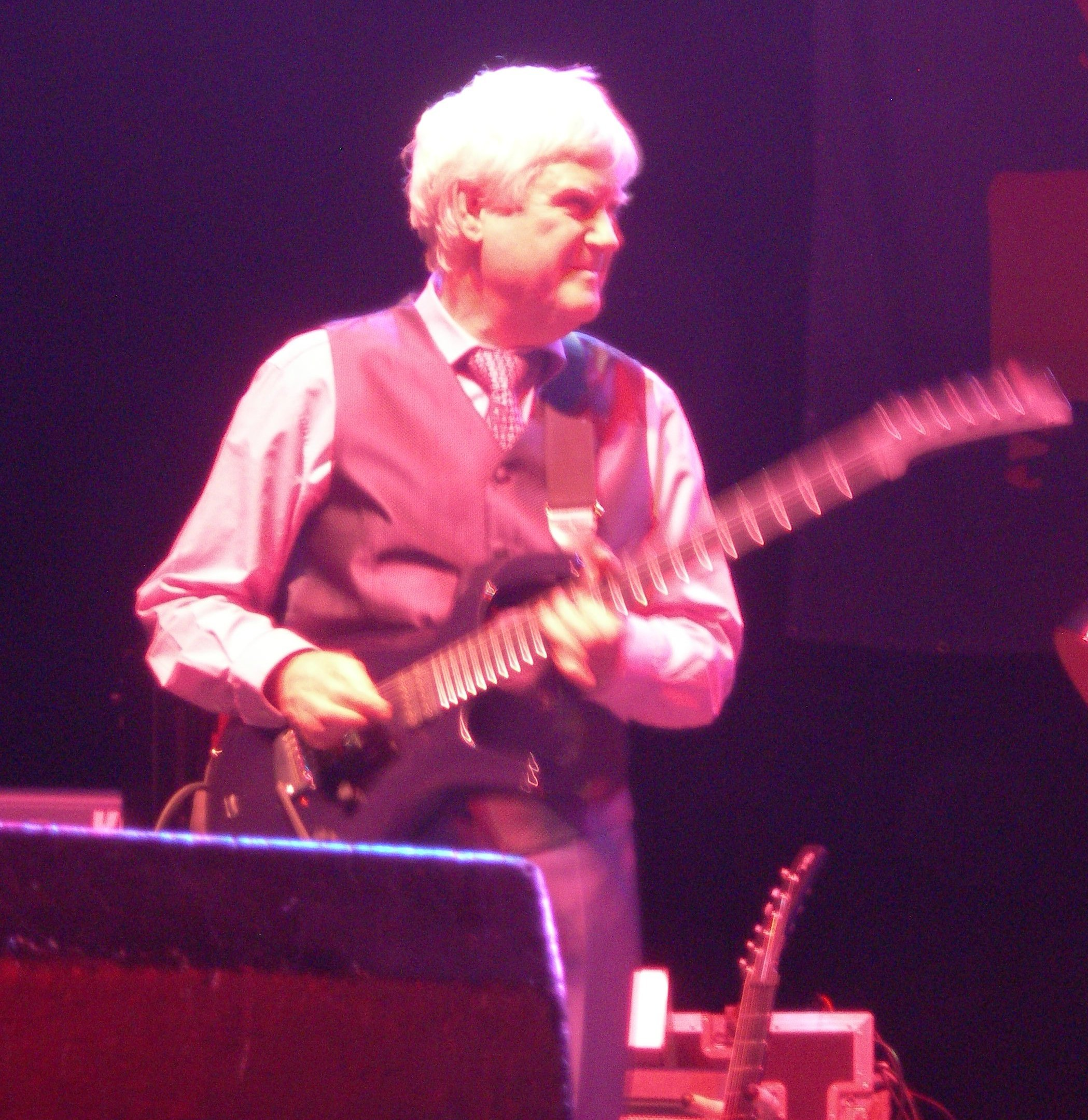
John Lees in 2009

This derivative of Barclay James Harvest features John Lees, bassist Craig Fletcher, drummer Kevin Whitehead and keyboard player Jez Smith. The band originally featured "Woolly" Stuart Wolstenholme on keyboards before his death in December 2010. The group formed in 1999 to record the album "Nexus". Craig Fletcher and Kevin Whitehead were from Wolstenholme's band "Maestoso", and John and Woolly were members of the original Barclay James Harvest. The band toured in the UK and Europe in 2006, and recorded the live album "Legacy" at the Shepherd's Bush Empire in London.

The band toured again around the UK in 2009. They played at the Berlin Wall anniversary festival at the Brandenburg Gate, Bad Homburg in Germany with JLBJH's best attendance of 17,500 people, and more recently in Porto, Portugal with an attendance of 5,000. The band recently visited America, and played in Philadelphia. John Lees' Barclay James Harvest is currently signed and managed by Esoteric Recordings. Mark Powell, founder of the label, works as the band manager.

In October 2013, JLBJH released "North", a studio album of all-new material, recorded at John's own Friamere Studios, on limited edition vinyl, CD and deluxe CD with a bonus disc recorded live at the Buxton Opera House. "North" was very well received, going on to become Cherry Red's biggest selling album of the fourth quarter of 2013. The band played nine gigs on a UK tour to promote the album, followed by a live radio concert for Christmas on German station SWR1. On 11 December 2022, John Lees announced on his website that his band would not tour after the 2023 gigs. The band also formerly featured Jeff Leach and Mike Bramwell as guest musicians.

Although not an active touring band the lineup from the previous album released Relativity on 17 October 2025. Once again it was produced by the band themselves and released through Esoteric Recordings. Stephen W. Tayler did the mixing for the album who is also known "for his previous work with artists including Kate Bush, Rupert Hine and Van der Graaf Generator." In review of the album Prog said that it "goes big on concepts, scale and length" and the "sophisticated 78 minutes glide confidently through the gentle, unhurried brand of progressive rock which made the BJH name." Bookended by the songs "Relativity Part 1 (Through The Dust)" and "Relativity Part 2 (The Stars That Shine)" the album contains songs that include "full-tempo constructions" and acoustic featured ballads. Despite previously stating that JLBJH will no longer tour, John Lees stated if "[Relativity] do a bit, then I’d have to look again at the live thing."

== Barclay James Harvest featuring Les Holroyd (since 2002) ==
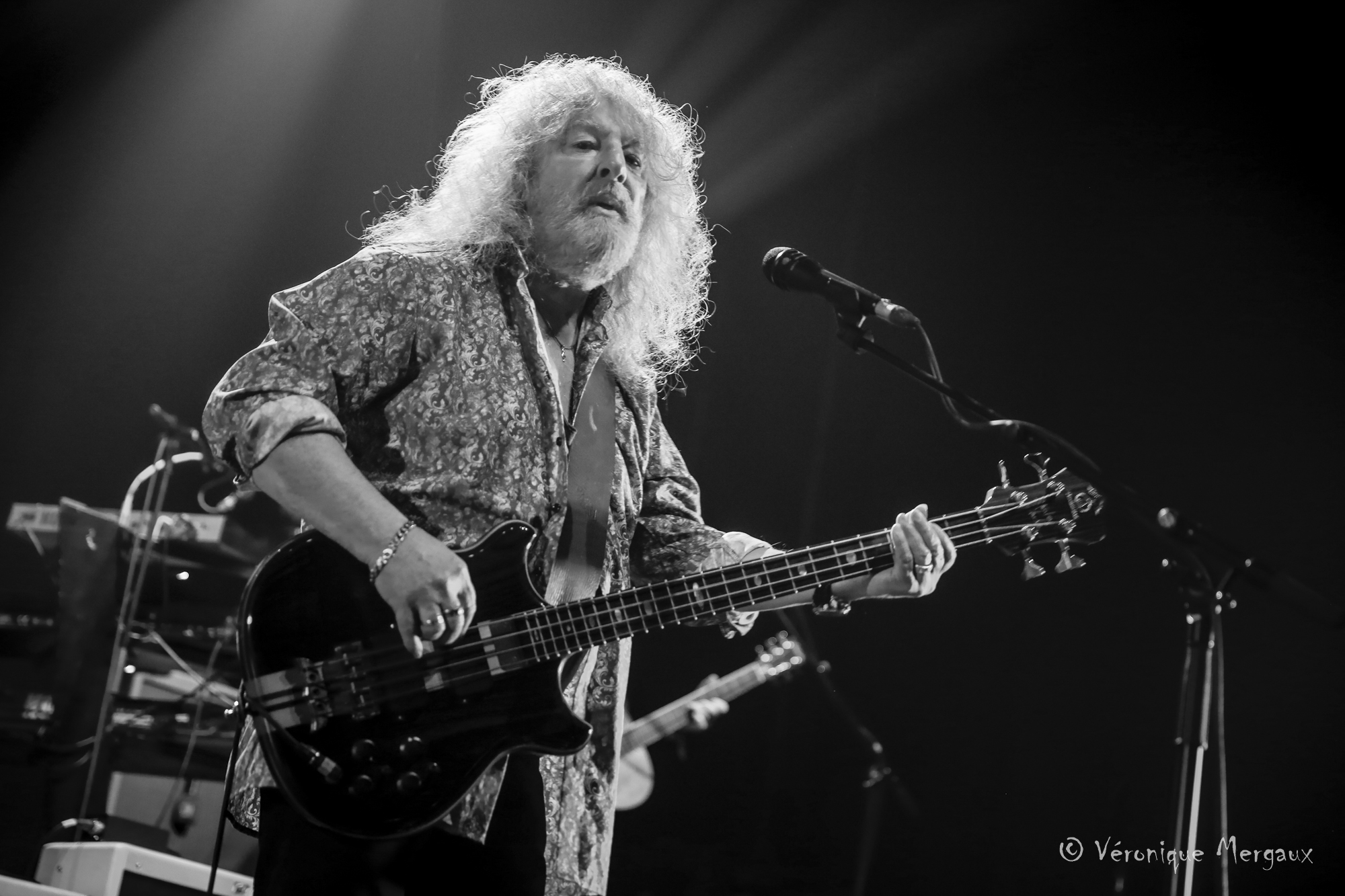
Les Holroyd in 2018

In 2001, Les Holroyd and Mel Pritchard returned to the studio to record the album 'Revolution Days' along with former Sad Cafe members Ian Wilson and Michael Byron-Hehir, as well as Steve Butler, Steve Pigott (Cher, Mike and the Mechanics), and Rabbit Bundrick (The Who). 'Revolution Days' was released in 2002, and a touring band was put together with Holroyd and Pritchard; Michael Byron-Hehir on lead guitar and vocals; Ian Wilson on guitar and vocals; Steve Butler on keyboards, percussion, and vocals; Chris Jago on drums; and former BJH sideman Colin Browne on keyboards and vocals. The first show was at the Colmar Wine Festival in August 2002. In October and November of that year, they undertook their first European Tour. More tours and festivals followed in 2003.

In January 2004, the band performed at the 'Art on Ice' spectacular at the Zurich Hallenstadion with Roger Hodgson, John Helliwell and Bob Siebenberg of Supertramp, Justin Hayward of The Moody Blues and Jeremy Spencer of Fleetwood Mac. Upon returning to the UK, Mel Pritchard died from a suspected heart attack.

In January 2005, BJHFLH toured with Asia featuring John Payne as support, returning the favour on four UK shows in March of the same year. In 2006, they undertook the Classic Meets Rock Symphonic Barclay Tour with the 25-piece Prague Philharmonic Orchestra. In July 2007, they toured the UK. Les Holroyd and Michael Byron-Hehir also worked on Alan Simon's Excalibur II album, Les Holroyd joining the stage show in 2010. Holroyd also performed in the live show of Simon's Anne de Bretagne. In 2011, Holroyd joined the Rock Meets Classic Tour along with Ian Gillan, Lou Gramm, Dan McCafferty with The Bohemian Symphony Orchestra, performing four BJH songs: "Hymn", "Mockingbird", "Ring Of Changes", and "Life Is For Living". Still touring Europe, the band introduced an acoustic spot into the set, showcasing their vocal harmonies with songs like "Poor Boy Blues", "Friend of Mine", and "Crazy City". They recorded their 2012 winter tour.

== External works ==
The band released a single "Breathless"/"When the City Sleeps" under the pseudonym of "Bombadil" in 1972. "Breathless", an instrumental, was credited to "Terry Bull" (actually John Lees). The B side "When the City Sleeps" was credited to "Lester Forest" (actually Woolly Wolstenholme), who also played every instrument and sang. This obscure track made an appearance on the soundtrack of the 2007 series Life on Mars, although it was not on the CD release.

== Members ==
=== Barclay James Harvest (1966–1998) ===
Official members

- Les Holroyd – vocals, bass, guitars, keyboards (1966–1998)
- John Lees – vocals, guitars, keyboards (1966–1998)
- Mel Pritchard – drums, percussion (1966–1998; died 2004)
- Stuart "Woolly" Wolstenholme – mellotron, keyboards, vocals, guitars (1966–1979; died 2010)

Guest musicians

- Kevin McAlea – keyboards (1980–1995)
- Colin Browne – keyboards (1980–1997)
- Bias Boshell – keyboards (1984–1987)
- Sam Brown – backing vocals (1984)
- Jan Ince – backing vocals (1984)
- Helen Chapelle – backing vocals (1984)
- Jeff Leach – keyboards (1997)

=== John Lees' Barclay James Harvest ===
Current members

- John Lees – vocals, guitars (1998–present)
- Craig Fletcher – bass, vocals (1998–present)
- Kevin Whitehead – drums, percussion (1998–present)
- Jez Smith – keyboards (2009–present)

Former members

- Stuart "Woolly" Wolstenholme – mellotron, keyboards, vocals, guitars (1998–2010; his death)

Guest musicians

- Jeff Leach – keyboards (1998–2006)
- Mike Bramwell – keyboards (2006–2009)
- John Joseph Lees – cornet (2006, 2009)
- Liz Fitzpatrick – trumpet (2009)

=== Barclay James Harvest featuring Les Holroyd ===
Current members

- Les Holroyd – vocals, bass, guitars, keyboards (2002–present)
- Steve Butler – percussion, keyboards, guitar, bass, backing vocals (2002–present)
- Michael Byron-Hehir – lead guitars, backing vocals (2002–present)
- Ralf Gustke – drums, percussion (2019–present)
- Jens Skwirblies – keyboards, vocals (2022–present)

Former members

- Mel Pritchard – drums, percussion (2002–2004; his death)
- Ian Wilson – rhythm guitars, backing vocals, bass (2002–2009)
- Chris Jago – drums, percussion (2002–2003, 2004–2005)
- Roy Martin – drums, percussion (2003–2004, 2006–2007)
- Paul Walsham – drums, percussion (2005–2006, 2007–2011)
- Colin Browne – keyboards, guitars, percussion, backing vocals (2002–2022)
- Louie Palmer – drums, percussion (2011–2019)

== Discography ==
Studio albums

- Barclay James Harvest (1970)
- Once Again (1971)
- Barclay James Harvest and Other Short Stories (1971)
- Baby James Harvest (1972)
- Everyone Is Everybody Else (1974)
- Time Honoured Ghosts (1975)
- Octoberon (1976)
- Gone to Earth (1977)
- XII (1978)
- Eyes of the Universe (1979)
- Turn of the Tide (1981)
- Ring of Changes (1983)
- Victims of Circumstance (1984)
- Face To Face (1987)
- Welcome to the Show (1990)
- Caught in the Light (1993)
- River of Dreams (1997)
