= Kevin McAlea =

Irish keyboard player and songwriter

- Born: 10 April 1949 (age 76); Belfast, Northern Ireland
- Genres: Pop, rock
- Occupations: Musician; songwriter
- Instruments: Piano; keyboards; synthesisers
- Years active: 1970–present
- Formerly of: Skid Row; Bees Make Honey; Kate Bush band; David Gilmour band

Kevin McAlea (born 10 April 1949) is an Irish keyboard player and songwriter, known for his work with Kate Bush, David Gilmour, and Barclay James Harvest and for writing English lyrics for the Nena song "99 Luftballons", as the international hit "99 Red Balloons". He also plays saxophone, guitar and uilleann pipes. He has built several analogue synthesiser systems and had an early interest in electronic music.

McAlea was born in Belfast, Northern Ireland. He attended St. Malachy's College there.

Early in his career he played in Skid Row, an Irish band which had included future members of Thin Lizzy.

He performed with Kate Bush, on her only tour, 1979's "The Tour of Life", and again during her 2014 Hammersmith Apollo residency, "Before the Dawn". He played with David Gilmour on parts of his 2015/2016 world tour which included concerts at the Hollywood Bowl and Madison Square Garden. He has also worked with Bees Make Honey, Clannad, Barbara Dixon, Dr Feelgood, Enya, Roy Harper, Kirsty MacColl, Seal, Poly Styrene, and Kim Wilde.

McAlea has a site with a library of traditional tunes and some recorded works, called Celtic Orbis. He also has released music under the same name.

== Discography ==
McAlea's career includes contributions to:

- 1979: Barclay James Harvest - Eyes of the Universe
- 1979: Kate Bush - Live at Hammersmith Odeon
- 1981: Barclay James Harvest - Turn Of The Tide
- 1987: Barclay James Harvest - Face To Face
- 1980: Poly Styrene - Translucence
- 1993: Barclay James Harvest - Caught In The Light
- 1997: Barclay James Harvest - River Of Dreams
- 2004: Poly Styrene - Flower Aeroplane
- 2007: Celtic Orbis - The Dagda's Cauldron
- 2014: Kate Bush - Before the Dawn
