= The River of Dreams =

1993 single by Billy Joel

Single by Billy Joel

from the album River of Dreams
- B-side: "The Great Wall of China"
- Released: July 19, 1993
- Genre: Gospel; doo-wop; R&B; pop
- Length: 4:05 (original version); 5:21 (extended version)
- Label: Columbia
- Songwriter: Billy Joel
- Producers: Joe Nicolo; Danny Kortchmar

Billy Joel singles chronology
"All Shook Up" (1992)	"The River of Dreams" (1993)	"No Man's Land" (1993)

Music video
- "The River of Dreams" on YouTube

"The River of Dreams" is a song by American musician Billy Joel. It is the title track and first single from his twelfth album, River of Dreams (1993). It was released in July 1993 by Columbia Records and became a hit, peaking at number three on the US and UK charts, making it Joel's best-charting single of the decade as well as his final top-10 hit in either country. It also reached number one in Australia, New Zealand, and on the Canadian and US Adult Contemporary charts. The song was produced by Joe Nicolo and Danny Kortchmar. Its accompanying music video was directed by Andy Morahan and filmed in Connecticut.

At least four versions of the song have been recorded and released. Two versions (released years later) include a bridge section containing a piano interlude paralleling Joel's melody from his song "Lullabye (Goodnight My Angel)", which is from the same album. These versions can be found on the boxed sets My Lives and Complete Hits Collection: 1973–1999—but even these versions differ from each other, both in length and in arrangement: one, for instance, has more percussion. A fourth mix appears as a bonus cut on the UK CD single of "River of Dreams"—the "percapella mix" done by Nicolo.

"The River of Dreams" was nominated for the Grammy Award for Record of the Year in 1994, losing to "I Will Always Love You" by Whitney Houston. Joel performed the song at the ceremony, and abruptly stopped in the middle of his performance in order to verbally protest Frank Sinatra's lifetime achievement speech being cut off earlier in the night.

In 1993, Gary Zimmerman, a songwriter from Long Island, New York, attempted to sue Joel for ten million dollars, claiming more than half of "The River of Dreams" was based on his 1986 song "Nowhere Land". Joel said he had no knowledge of Zimmerman or his music, and Zimmerman dropped the lawsuit in 1994.

== Production ==
The song borrows from the traditions of black gospel music and spirituals. The production includes a gospel choir and the lyrics deal with inner peace and the afterlife. Joel sings "Not sure about a life after this. God knows I've never been a spiritual man," while stating that at night he walks along "The River of Dreams" so he can "find what he's been looking for." At 3 minutes 45 seconds, Joel can be heard singing the Cadillacs' version of "Gloria" as the music fades out.

== Critical reception ==
Pan-European magazine Music & Media wrote, "Two ancient vocal genres meet each other in a modern rhythmic context, when Joel's doowop falsetto gets wrapped up in the sound of gospel backup singers." Alan Jones from Music Week gave the song a score of three out of five, describing it as "a simple and immediate song wherein his vocals are echoed by a choir who imbue the song with spiritual qualities." He added, "A lot of fun, highly infectious and a hit."

== Music video ==
The music video for the song was directed by British commercial, film and music video director Andy Morahan. The ferry featured is the Rocky Hill – Glastonbury Ferry in Connecticut. The video was shot on the Providence & Worcester railroad bridge spanning the Connecticut River in the city of Middletown, Connecticut. Joel and three backup singers appear throughout the video standing on the western span of the bridge, with the open center section of the bridge behind them. Other locations that were filmed in the music video are near Portland, East Haddam, and Old Saybrook, Connecticut. The scenes inside the tobacco barn with Joel on the piano were filmed inside a still-used tobacco barn on Horton Farm in South Glastonbury, Connecticut.

Joel's then-wife Christie Brinkley can be seen painting the artwork that features on the front cover of the album River of Dreams. She is the illustrator who painted the actual album artwork, and each single released from the album featured one part of the large painting as cover art.

== Track listings ==
All songs were written by Billy Joel.

- UK CD single
1. "The River of Dreams"
2. "The River of Dreams" (Percapella mix)
3. "The Great Wall of China"
- Japanese mini-CD single
1. "The River of Dreams" – 4:07
2. "No Man's Land" – 4:49

== Personnel ==
- Billy Joel – lead vocals, piano, Hammond organ, synthesizer
- Zachary Alford – drums
- Lewis Del Gatto – orchestra manager
- Lonnie Hillyer – bass
- Jeff Jacobs – additional programming
- Jeff Lee Johnson – bass
- Danny Kortchmar – guitar
- Andy Kravitz – percussion
- Ira Newborn – orchestration
- Wrecia Ford, Marlon Saunders, Frank Simms, George Simms, B. David Witworth – background vocals
- Crystal Taliefero – vocal arrangement, background vocals
- Chuck Treece – bass
- Mike Tyler – guitar

== Charts ==
=== Weekly charts ===
Weekly chart performance for "The River of Dreams"
Chart (1993)	Peak position
Australia (ARIA)	1
Austria (Ö3 Austria Top 40)	2
Belgium (Ultratop 50 Flanders)	11
Canada Retail Singles (The Record)	7
Canada Top Singles (RPM)	2
Canada Adult Contemporary (RPM)	1
Denmark (IFPI)	9
Europe (Eurochart Hot 100)	7
Europe (European Hit Radio)	2
France (SNEP)	4
Germany (GfK)	4
Iceland (Íslenski Listinn Topp 40)	7
Ireland (IRMA)	2
Israel (Israeli Singles Chart)	14
Italy (Musica e dischi)	25
Japan (Oricon)	8
Netherlands (Dutch Top 40)	5
Netherlands (Single Top 100)	5
New Zealand (Recorded Music NZ)	1
Norway (VG-lista)	8
Spain Airplay (Top 40 Radio)	1
Sweden (Sverigetopplistan)	8
Switzerland (Schweizer Hitparade)	2
UK Singles (Official Charts)	3
UK Airplay (Music Week)	1
US Billboard Hot 100	3
US Adult Contemporary (Billboard)	1
US Pop Airplay (Billboard)	2
US Cash Box Top 100	1
Zimbabwe (ZIMA)	5

=== Year-end charts ===
1993 year-end chart performance for "The River of Dreams"
Chart (1993)	Position
Australia (ARIA)	13
Austria (Ö3 Austria Top 40)	25
Belgium (Ultratop)	66
Canada Top Singles (RPM)	12
Canada Adult Contemporary (RPM)	2
Europe (Eurochart Hot 100)	33
Europe (European Hit Radio)	3
Germany (Media Control)	27
Iceland (Íslenski Listinn Topp 40)	12
Netherlands (Dutch Top 40)	25
Netherlands (Single Top 100)	41
New Zealand (RIANZ)	8
Sweden (Topplistan)	24
Switzerland (Schweizer Hitparade)	37
UK Singles (OCC)	27
UK Airplay (Music Week)	1
US Billboard Hot 100	26
US Adult Contemporary (Billboard)	9
US Cash Box Top 100	33

1994 year-end chart performance for "The River of Dreams"
Chart (1994)	Position
US Adult Contemporary (Billboard)	19

== Certifications ==
Certifications and sales for "The River of Dreams"
Region	Certification	Certified units/sales
Australia (ARIA)	Platinum	70,000^{^}
Austria (IFPI Austria)	Gold	25,000^{*}
France (SNEP)	Silver	125,000^{*}
Germany (BVMI)	Gold	250,000^{^}
Japan	—	220,000
New Zealand (RMNZ)	Platinum	30,000^{‡}
United Kingdom (BPI)	Silver	200,000^{‡}
United States (RIAA)	Platinum	1,000,000^{‡}
^{*} Sales figures based on certification alone.^{^} Shipments figures based on certification alone.^{‡} Sales+streaming figures based on certification alone.

== Release history ==
Release dates and formats for "The River of Dreams"
Region	Date	Format(s)	Label(s)	Ref.
Australia	July 19, 1993	CD; cassette	Columbia	
United Kingdom	July 19, 1993	7-inch vinyl; CD; cassette	Columbia	
Japan	August 5, 1993	Mini-CD	Sony	
