= Les Holroyd =

- Holroyd performing in 2018

Background information
- Born: Richard Leslie Holroyd; 12 March 1948 (age 78)
- Origin: Oldham, Lancashire, England
- Genres: rock classic rock progressive rock
- Occupation: musician
- Instruments: bass guitar, acoustic guitar, electric guitar, keyboards
- Years active: 1960's–present
- Labels: Harvest, Polydor

Les Holroyd (born Richard Leslie Holroyd, 12 March 1948, Oldham, Lancashire, England), is an English bass guitarist, vocalist and songwriter, formerly with the British progressive rock band Barclay James Harvest.

== Biography ==
Holroyd is a founder member of Barclay James Harvest, and played with the band throughout its life.

Following the split of the original band, he now tours with his own version of BJH, known as Barclay James Harvest featuring Les Holroyd. Initially, the band featured Barclay James Harvest drummer Mel Pritchard. They released an album called Revolution Days, and later a live recording with the Prague Philharmonic Orchestra.

Holroyd has collaborated with Alan Simon, notably in the 2009 rock opera Anne de Bretagne, in which he played King Henry VII of England.
