= Mel Pritchard =

- Born: Melvyn Paul Pritchard; 20 January 1948
- Origin: Oldham, Lancashire, England
- Died: 28 January 2004 (aged 56) Greenfield, Greater Manchester, England
- Genres: Rock; Classic rock Progressive rock
- Occupations: Musician, drummer
- Instrument: drums
- Years active: 1960s–2004
- Labels: Harvest, Polydor

Melvyn Paul Pritchard (20 January 1948 – 28 January 2004) was the English drummer with the British progressive rock band, Barclay James Harvest.

== Biography ==
Pritchard was born in Oldham, Lancashire, England. He played with Barclay James Harvest throughout their career and following the band's split, worked with Les Holroyd in his spin-off band, 'Barclay James Harvest featuring Les Holroyd'.

Pritchard died in his sleep, at home in Greenfield, Greater Manchester, of a heart attack in 2004, at the age of 56.
