= Running Up That Hill =

1985 single by Kate Bush

Single by Kate Bush

from the album Hounds of Love
- B-side: "Under the Ivy"
- Released: 5 August 1985
- Studio: Wickham Farm Home Studio (Welling, England)
- Genre: Synth-pop; new wave; art pop; art rock
- Length: 4:58
- Label: EMI
- Songwriter: Kate Bush
- Producer: Kate Bush

Kate Bush singles chronology
"Night of the Swallow" (1983)	"Running Up That Hill" (1985)	"Cloudbusting" (1985)

Music video
- "Running Up That Hill" on YouTube

"Running Up That Hill" (also titled "Running Up That Hill (A Deal with God)") is a song by the English singer-songwriter Kate Bush, released as the lead single from her fifth studio album, Hounds of Love, on 5 August 1985 by EMI Records. Bush wrote and produced it using a Fairlight CMI synthesiser and a LinnDrum drum machine. The lyrics imagine a man and a woman who make "a deal with God" to exchange places.

Bush debuted "Running Up That Hill" in a performance on the BBC One chat show Wogan. The music video features Bush performing an interpretive dance. On its first release, it reached number three on the UK singles chart, Bush's highest position since her number-one single "Wuthering Heights" in 1978, and number 30 on the US Billboard Hot 100 chart. It was named among the year's best tracks by Melody Maker and NME, and nominated for British Single of the Year at the 1986 Brit Awards. Rolling Stone placed it at number 60 in its 2021 list of the "500 Greatest Songs of All Time".

"Running Up That Hill" was remixed for the 2012 Summer Olympics closing ceremony and reached number six on the UK singles chart. After it was featured in the Netflix series Stranger Things in 2022, it reached number one in eight countries and reached a billion streams on Spotify. It has been covered by acts including Placebo, Within Temptation, St Vincent, Chromatics, Faith and the Muse and Meg Myers.

== Background and recording ==
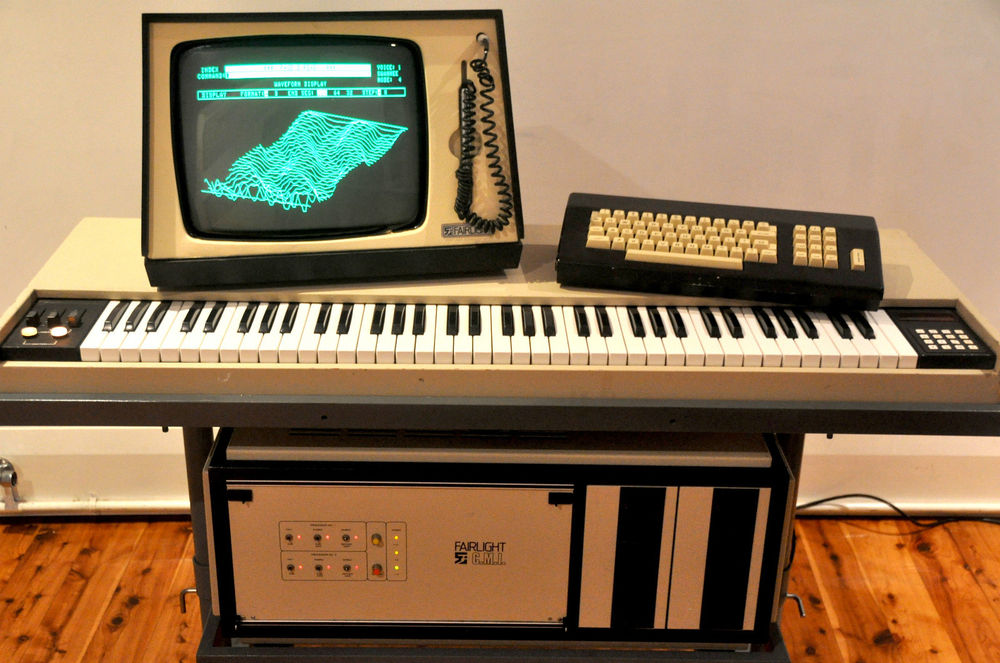
The Fairlight CMI synthesiser

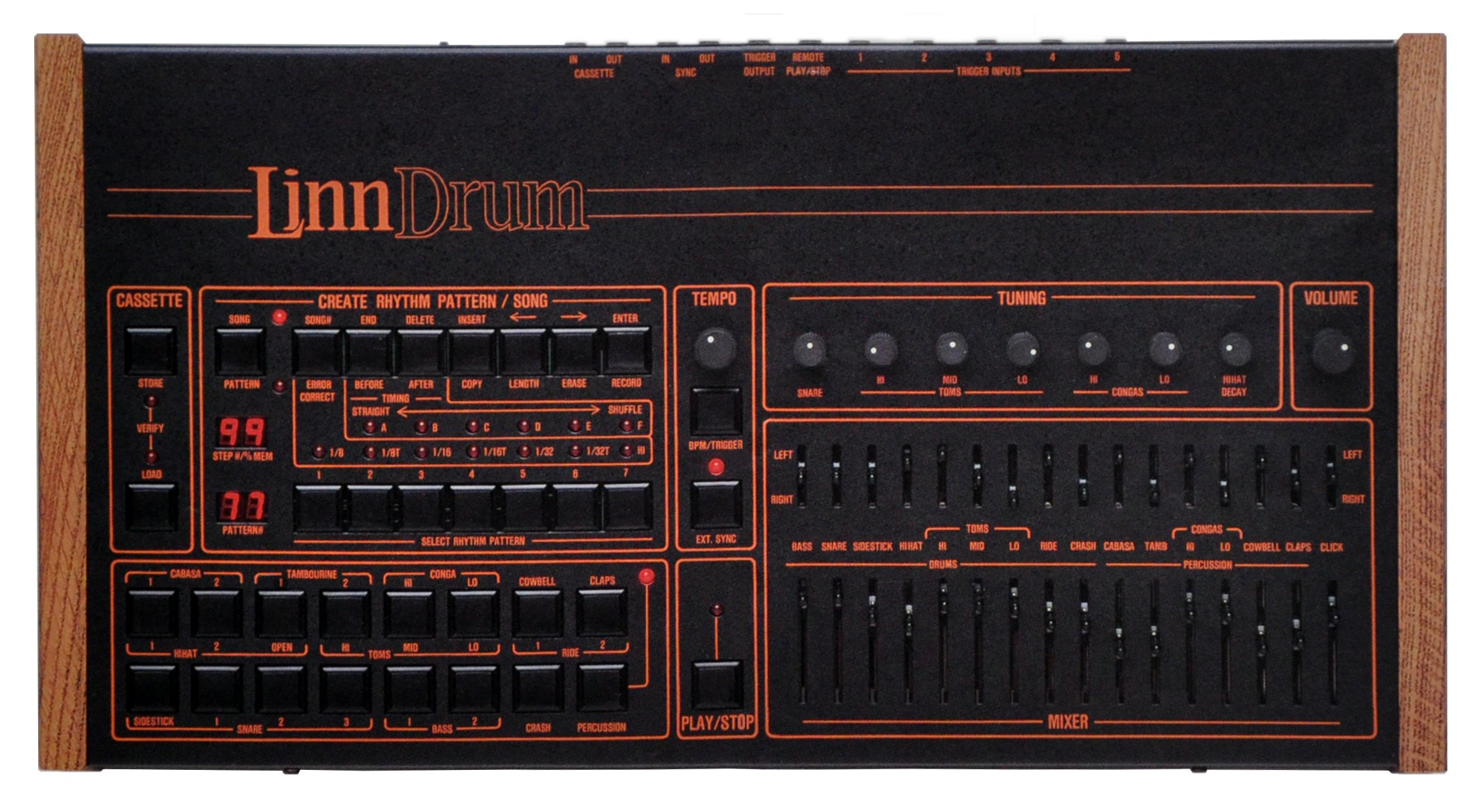
The LinnDrum drum machine

In 1983, Bush moved from London to rural Sevenoaks, where she set up a songwriting room with a piano, a Fairlight CMI synthesiser and an eight-track recorder. "Running Up That Hill" was the first song Bush composed for her fifth album, Hounds of Love (1985). She wrote it in a single evening, and recorded a demo onto eight-track. According to Bush, the song began with the Fairlight riff. She sang a drum pattern to her boyfriend and recording engineer, Del Palmer, who programmed it into a LinnDrum drum machine. She said the lyrics for the first verse "came straight away".

In early 1984, Bush moved to her new studio at East Wickham Farm in her childhood home of Welling, Kent, where she further developed "Running Up That Hill" with Palmer and the engineers Paul Hardiman and Haydn Bendall. She had the eight-track demo transferred to 24-track to build on the feel and atmosphere, refining the Fairlight riff and rerecording parts including vocals.

The main riff was played on the Fairlight using its sampled cello sound. This replaced an earlier harp sound, which Bush found too noisy. The drone part was developed by "freezing" a chord into a Quantec digital reverb. The drummer, Stuart Elliott, overdubbed a snare to strengthen the LinnDrum snare, and added fills at the end combined with sounds from the Fairlight. Palmer added a "pulsing" bassline, blending with the toms. Alan Murphy overdubbed guitar for the ending. Bush's brother, Paddy Bush, performed balalaika.

== Music and lyrics ==
Running Up That Hill
Sample of the chorus

"Running Up That Hill" features synthesisers, guitar, bass, a driving drum beat and balalaika, a Russian string instrument. It uses the key of C minor, with a vocal melody focusing on the minor seventh, creating tension and a sense of pending resolution. On the word "could", Bush sings a major seventh over an A-flat major chord, using dissonance to create more tension.

The drummer, Stuart Elliott, said: "The tension in that track is just remarkable. Every step of the way, there's a little twist and turn that's different from the previous verse — an extra line or one line less, or a repeat just in the perfect places. There's absolutely no dead space ... It's just so deceptively simple." Classic FM described it as "passionate and pleading", with uncertainty and a longing for emotional resolution.

Bush said the lyrics address the inability of men and women to understand each other. She imagined that by making "a deal with God", they could exchange places and reach a greater understanding. Bush originally titled the song "A Deal with God", but her record label, EMI Records, felt this was sensitive and could limit its radio play. Bush agreed to change it as she had not had a hit song in some time and wanted to "give the album a chance". On the album, it was titled "Running Up That Hill (A Deal with God)". In 2022, Bush said she still thought of the song with the original title.

== Release and reception ==
Bush debuted "Running Up That Hill" in a performance on the BBC One chat show Wogan to an estimated audience of nine million. She performed from behind a lectern, backed by a band including Palmer and Paddy Bush. The performers wore coats similar to religious habits and were accompanied by standard-bearers waving "billowing" flags. Mojo wrote later: "Particularly in the context of a cosy mainstream show, there was something distinctly ritualistic about the whole affair, certainly in keeping with the song's magickal theme." Bush also performed it on the West German show Peter's Pop Show. "Running Up That Hill" was released as the lead single from Hounds of Love on 5 August 1985, and reached number three on the UK singles chart.

In 1985, Smash Hits named "Running Up That Hill" its "single of the fortnight" and praised its "melodic strength" and "coolly restrained performance". An otherwise negative review in the Record Mirror described it as "nice". Edwin Pouncey of Sounds said he was "seduced by the sheer strangeness of Ms Bush's dramatic return". It was named the year's second-best track by Melody Maker and the third-best by NME. At the 1986 Brit Awards, "Running Up That Hill" was nominated for British Single of the Year.

== Music video ==
The music video was directed by David Garfath and choreographed by Diane Grey. It features Bush performing an interpretive dance with the dancer Misha Hervieu. Bush felt that dance in music videos was "being used quite trivially, it was being exploited: haphazard images, busy, lots of dances, without really the serious expression, and wonderful expression, that dance can give". Instead, she wanted to create a "serious piece of dance" comprising a simple routine between two people. In the video, Bush mimics an archer pulling a bow, an idea she reused for the single cover.

Hervieu said she was cast as she was not following the trends of dance in pop music at the time. As Hervieu was much taller than Bush, they discovered Bush could wrap around her body "like a snake" and incorporated this into the dance. To evade Equity union rules against moonlighting, Hervieu said she could not appear in the West End musical Barnum because of illness, for which she was fired from the play.

== Live performances ==
Bush performed "Running Up That Hill" in 1987 at The Secret Policeman's Third Ball, accompanied by the Pink Floyd guitarist David Gilmour and Tony Franklin on fretless bass. Guitar World wrote in 2022 that the performance was "immaculate ... The material brings out the best in Gilmour. Bush's voice defies the cardiovascular reality of performing onstage. Tony Franklin ... is godlike." Bush performed "Running Up That Hill" at her Before the Dawn concerts in 2014.

== Legacy ==
In 2014, NME named "Running Up That Hill" the 108th-greatest song of all time. That year, NME included it at number 25 in its "story of NME in 70 (mostly) seminal songs", with Mark Beaumont writing that Bush was "a totemic figure in sneaking left field ideas into the heart of the charts". Reviewing Hounds of Love in 2016, the Pitchfork critic Barry Walters wrote that "Running Up That Hill" had "brought to the mainstream gender-equality issues that female-led post-punk acts like Au Pairs had been thrashing out for years in the underground". He connected its lyrics, Bush's performance and the pitch-shifting effect on her vocals to gender issues: "As if trying to escape her body, sex, and consciousness ... Armed with equally advanced machines and melodies, Bush now creatively trumped nearly every mid-'80s rocker." The AllMusic journalist Amy Hanson wrote: "Always adept at emotion and beautifully able to manipulate even the most bitter of hearts, rarely has Bush penned such a brutally truthful, painfully sensual song."

In 2021, Rolling Stone placed "Running Up That Hill" at number 60 in its updated list of the "500 Greatest Songs of All Time". It was nominated for Favourite Rock Song at the American Music Awards of 2022. That year, Mojo described it as "timeless and unique ... barely a whiff of anachronism arises from its dated technology ... Both lyrically and musically, it remains an outstanding example of how innovative, catchy and weird pop music can be." In 2023, "Running Up That Hill" was named Bush's third-best song by Mojo and her best UK single by The Guardian. In 2024, the Rolling Stone journalist Rob Sheffield wrote: "Her classic synth-goth anthem sounded ahead of its time in the eighties. But only Kate Bush could make it a song that still sounds ahead of its time nearly 40 years later ... It became a timeless pop standard, without losing its spooky sense of dread."

=== Resurgence with Stranger Things ===
In May 2022, "Running Up That Hill" gained renewed attention after it was featured in the fourth season of the Netflix series Stranger Things. Winona Ryder, who plays Joyce Byers, said she had been a fan of Bush since childhood and had pushed to include the song. Bush, who rarely licenses her songs, agreed since she was a fan of the series. The composer, Rob Simonsen, created an orchestral remix recorded in AIR Studios, London. To create the feeling of a lullaby, he added a choir, combined with the "juggernaut" of a full orchestra. The remix appears as a motif throughout the series and in a pivotal scene.

After its use in Stranger Things, "Running Up That Hill" became the most streamed song on Spotify in the UK and the US. It became Bush's second UK number-one single after "Wuthering Heights" (1978), making Bush the solo artist with the longest gap between two number-one UK singles (44 years) and, at the age of 63, the oldest female artist to achieve a UK number one. The 37 years it took to reach number one was also a record. "Running Up That Hill" also reached number one in Australia, Belgium, Ireland, Lithuania, Luxembourg, New Zealand, Sweden, and Switzerland. On 27 May 2022, the music video had 48.2 million views on YouTube; by 17 July, it had more than 100 million views.

On 1 September, "Running Up That Hill" was issued as a CD single for the first time. It sold 1,077,284 copies in the UK in 2022. In the US, "Running Up That Hill" reached number three on the Billboard Hot 100 chart, beating its 1985 peak of number 30, Bush's highest previous placement. It also entered the Billboard rock and Alternative Airplay charts and reached number one on the Hot Alternative Songs and Hot Rock & Alternative Songs charts. Stranger Things popularised "Running Up That Hill" with Generation Z, whose members were not born when it was released, and it appeared in videos on the social media platform TikTok. The British Official Charts Company described the success as an example of 1980s nostalgia. Bush said the renewed interest was extraordinary and touching.

On 22 June 2023, "Running Up That Hill" reached one billion streams on Spotify. In response, Bush wrote: "I have an image of a river that suddenly floods and becomes many, many tributaries — a billion streams — on their way to the sea. Each one of these streams is one of you. Thank you so much for sending this song on such an impossibly astonishing journey. I'm blown away." After "Running Up That Hill" appeared in the fifth season of Stranger Things in 2025, it surpassed 1.5 billion streams on Spotify and reached number 14 on the UK singles chart in January 2026.

== Covers and remixes ==
The American singer-songwriter Tori Amos has occasionally incorporated "Running Up That Hill" into her performances since the 1990s, often as part of a medley. The English actor and comedian Steve Coogan, performing as the comedy character Alan Partridge, performed "Running Up That Hill" as part of a medley of Bush songs for the charity Comic Relief in 1999. On 20 August 2022, Partridge joined the British rock band Coldplay to perform "Running Up That Hill" at Wembley Stadium, London. The American rock band Faith and the Muse included a goth-style cover of "Running Up That Hill" on the 2001 compilation album Vera Causa.

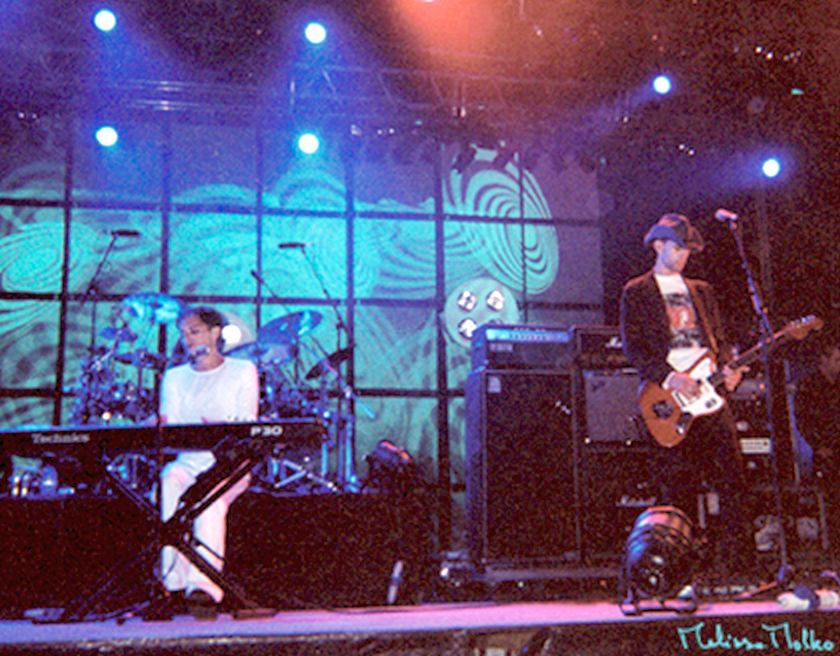
Placebo (pictured in 2001) released a cover of "Running Up That Hill" in 2003.

The British rock band Placebo included a version of "Running Up That Hill" on their 2003 compilation album Covers, which reached number 44 on the UK singles chart. Guitar World said Placebo's version is often credited as the "defining" cover, describing it as a "glistening ‘00s update" with a "pulsating heartbeat bassline" and "quivering vocal" that "evokes the sense of a protagonist on life support, bargaining with supernatural forces". In the same year, a cover by the Dutch symphonic metal band Within Temptation, featuring an orchestral section and choir, reached the top 10 of the Dutch Single Top 100.

In 2007, the American electronic band Chromatics released a "menacing" version on their album Night Drive. A remix of "Running Up That Hill" was used during the 2012 Summer Olympics closing ceremony. It was included in the Olympics soundtrack album A Symphony of British Music and reached number six on the UK singles chart on 19 August, becoming Bush's first top-ten single since "King of the Mountain" in 2005. The Swedish band First Aid Kit performed an acoustic version at the 2018 Rock Werchter festival. A version by the American musician Meg Myers reached number one on the Billboard Rock Airplay chart and the Alternative Songs chart in January 2020. The American singer Emma Ruth Rundle and members of the bands Mastodon, Yob and Old Man Gloom performed a version on YouTube during the 2020 COVID-19 lockdowns. In 2021, the American rock band Car Seat Headrest released a "lower fi, measured" cover.

Bush described a version performed in 2022 by the Australian choir Pub Choir, arranged by Astrid Jorgensen, as "utterly wonderful". The German singer Kim Petras recorded a cover for Amazon Music's playlist for 2022 Pride Month, which reached number 100 on the UK singles chart. That year, the British singer Raye performed a stripped-back version for BBC Radio 1, and the American singer Halsey performed "Running Up That Hill" at the Governors Ball Music Festival in New York City, saying "truly wish I wrote this song more than anything in the world". That September, the British singer Rita Ora performed a mashup of "Running Up That Hill" with her song "For You" at the Rock in Rio festival. It received negative reviews; some accused Ora of oversinging or performing it because of its recent popularity from its use in Stranger Things. Ora's performance drew comparisons to Fergie's infamous rendition of "The Star-Spangled Banner" at the 2018 NBA All-Star Game. The American musician St. Vincent performed "Running Up That Hill" at Bush's induction into the Rock and Roll Hall of Fame in 2023, which Bush did not attend.

== Track listing and formats ==
All tracks written and produced by Kate Bush.

UK 7-inch 1985 single and limited edition 2022 CD single
No.	Title	Length
1.	"Running Up That Hill"	4:58
2.	"Under the Ivy"	2:07

UK 12-inch 1985 maxi single
No.	Title	Length
1.	"Running Up That Hill" (Extended Version)	5:43
2.	"Under the Ivy"	2:07
3.	"Running Up That Hill" (Instrumental)	4:54

== Personnel ==
- Kate Bush – vocals, Fairlight CMI
- Alan Murphy – electric guitar
- Del Palmer – bass guitar, LinnDrum programming
- Stuart Elliott – drums
- Paddy Bush – balalaika

== Charts ==
=== Weekly charts ===
1985 weekly chart performance for "Running Up That Hill"
Chart (1985)	Peak position
Australia (Kent Music Report)	6
Austria (Ö3 Austria Top 40)	21
Belgium (Ultratop 50 Flanders)	6
Canada Top Singles (RPM)	16
Europe (European Hot 100 Singles)	8
Finland (Suomen virallinen lista)	13
France (SNEP)	24
Ireland (IRMA)	4
Italy (Musica e dischi)	22
Luxembourg (Radio Luxembourg)	3
Netherlands (Dutch Top 40)	6
Netherlands (Single Top 100)	6
New Zealand (RIANZ)	26
Quebec (ADISQ)	33
Switzerland (Schweizer Hitparade)	10
UK Singles (Official Charts)	3
US Billboard Hot 100	30
US 12-inch Singles Sales (Billboard)	21
US Dance Club Songs (Billboard)	13
US Mainstream Rock (Billboard)	34
US Cash Box Top 100	28
West Germany (Media Control)	3

Weekly chart performance for 2012 remix
Chart (2012)	Peak position
Ireland (IRMA)	22
UK singles chart	6

2014 weekly chart performance for "Running Up That Hill"
Chart (2014)	Peak position
UK singles chart	51

2022 weekly chart performance for "Running Up That Hill"
Chart (2022)	Peak position
Argentina Hot 100 (Billboard)	47
Australia (ARIA)	1
Austria (Ö3 Austria Top 40)	3
Belgium (Ultratop 50 Flanders)	33
Belgium (Ultratop 50 Wallonia)	23
Brazil (Billboard)	21
Canada Hot 100 (Billboard)	2
Canada AC (Billboard)	34
Canada CHR/Top 40 (Billboard)	37
Canada Hot AC (Billboard)	24
Canada Rock (Billboard)	47
Croatia (Billboard)	4
Czech Republic Singles Digital (ČNS IFPI)	2
Denmark (Tracklisten)	6
Finland (Suomen virallinen lista)	6
France (SNEP)	3
Germany (GfK)	4
Global 200 (Billboard)	1
Greece International (IFPI)	2
Hungary (Single Top 40)	2
Hungary (Stream Top 40)	6
Iceland (Tónlistinn)	2
India International Singles (IMI)	10
Ireland (IRMA)	1
Italy (FIMI)	18
Japan Hot Overseas (Billboard Japan)	18
Lithuania (AGATA)	1
Luxembourg (Billboard)	1
Malaysia (RIM)	8
Mexico (Billboard)	20
Netherlands (Dutch Top 40)	16
Netherlands (Single Top 100)	3
New Zealand (Recorded Music NZ)	1
Norway (VG-lista)	4
Philippines (Billboard)	11
Poland (Billboard)	8
Portugal (AFP)	4
Romania Streaming (Billboard)	20
Singapore (RIAS)	5
Slovakia (Singles Digitál Top 100)	2
South Africa Streaming (TOSAC)	6
Spain (Promusicae)	48
Sweden (Sverigetopplistan)	1
Switzerland (Schweizer Hitparade)	1
UK Singles (Official Charts)	1
US Billboard Hot 100	3
US Adult Contemporary (Billboard)	9
US Adult Pop Airplay (Billboard)	5
US Hot Rock & Alternative Songs (Billboard)	1
US Rock & Alternative Airplay (Billboard)	2
US Pop Airplay (Billboard)	5
Vietnam (Vietnam Hot 100)	40

Chart (2023)	Peak position
UK Singles (Official Charts)	55

Chart (2025–2026)	Peak position
Ireland	33
Poland (Polish Streaming Top 100)	50
Russia Streaming (TopHit)	52
UK Singles	14

=== Monthly charts ===
Monthly chart performance for "Running Up That Hill"
Chart (2026)	Peak position
Russia Streaming (TopHit)	51

=== Year-end charts ===
Year-end chart performance for "Running Up That Hill"
Chart (1985)	Position
Australia (Kent Music Report)	72
Belgium (Ultratop)	50
Netherlands (Dutch Top 40)	45
Netherlands (Single Top 100)	40
UK Singles (OCC)	56
West Germany (Media Control)	30

2022 year-end chart performance for "Running Up That Hill"
Chart (2022)	Position
Australia (ARIA)	11
Austria (Ö3 Austria Top 40)	46
Belgium (Ultratop 50 Flanders)	162
Belgium (Ultratop 50 Wallonia)	141
Brazil Streaming (Pro-Música Brasil)	179
Canada (Canadian Hot 100)	24
Denmark (Tracklisten)	66
Germany (GfK)	35
Global 200 (Billboard)	18
Hungary (Single Top 40)	19
Hungary (Stream Top 40)	47
Lithuania (AGATA)	11
Netherlands (Single Top 100)	59
New Zealand (Recorded Music NZ)	29
Sweden (Sverigetopplistan)	35
Switzerland (Schweizer Hitparade)	33
UK Singles (OCC)	6
US Billboard Hot 100	23
US Adult Contemporary (Billboard)	18
US Adult Top 40 (Billboard)	19
US Hot Rock & Alternative Songs (Billboard)	4
US Mainstream Top 40 (Billboard)	26
US Rock Airplay (Billboard)	9

=== Decade-end charts ===
Decade-end chart performance for "Running Up That Hill"
Chart (2025–2026)	Position
Russia Streaming (TopHit)	87

== Certifications ==
Certifications for "Running Up That Hill"
Region	Certification	Certified units/sales
Canada (Music Canada)	2× Platinum	160,000^{‡}
Denmark (IFPI Danmark)	Platinum	90,000^{‡}
Germany (BVMI)	Gold	250,000^{‡}
Italy (FIMI)	Platinum	100,000^{‡}
New Zealand (RMNZ)	3× Platinum	90,000^{‡}
Portugal (AFP)	Platinum	40,000^{‡}
Spain (Promusicae)	Platinum	60,000^{‡}
United Kingdom (BPI) Physical 1985 sales	Silver	250,000^{^}
United Kingdom (BPI) Digital sales since 2004	4× Platinum	2,400,000^{‡}
Streaming
Greece (IFPI Greece)	2× Platinum	4,000,000^{†}
Sweden (GLF)	Platinum	8,000,000^{†}
^{^} Shipments figures based on certification alone.^{‡} Sales+streaming figures based on certification alone.^{†} Streaming-only figures based on certification alone.
