= Scared of the Dark (disambiguation) =

Scared of the Dark is a 2017 song by the British group, Steps.

It can also refer to:

- Scared of the Dark (TV series), a 2023 British TV series on Channel 4
- Scared of the Dark, a song on Spider-Man: Into the Spider-Verse (soundtrack)
- Scared of the Dark, a 2013 film starring Takashi Shimizu
- "Scared of the Dark", a 2022 song by BoyWithUke from Serotonin Dreams

== See also ==
- Fear of the dark
