= Sorry (Meg Myers album) =

Studio album by Meg Myers
- Released: September 18, 2015
- Genre: Pop rock; electronic rock; synth-pop
- Length: 41:24
- Label: Atlantic
- Producer: Dr. Rosen Rosen

Meg Myers chronology
Make a Shadow (2014)	Sorry (2015)	Take Me to the Disco (2018)

Singles from Sorry
- 1. "Sorry" Released: April 8, 2015; 2. "Lemon Eyes" Released: October 18, 2015; 3. "Motel" Released: April 13, 2016

Professional ratings
Review scores
Source	Rating
AllMusic	3.5/5 stars
Sputnikmusic	3.8/5 stars
Renowned For Sound	Favorable

Sorry is the debut studio album recorded by American singer-songwriter Meg Myers. The album was released September 18, 2015 via Atlantic Records on CD, digital download, and on vinyl.

== Track listing ==
All tracks are written by Meg Myers and Andrew Robert Rosen.

No.	Title	Length
1.	"Motel"	4:27
2.	"Sorry"	3:57
3.	"A Bolt from the Blue"	3:55
4.	"Desire"	4:44
5.	"I Really Want You to Hate Me"	3:52
6.	"Parade"	3:25
7.	"Lemon Eyes"	3:42
8.	"Make a Shadow"	4:23
9.	"The Morning After"	3:23
10.	"Feather"	5:36
Total length:		41:24

== Personnel ==
- Anne Declemente – A&R
- Steve Robertson – A&R
- Mark Obriski – art direction, design
- Rob Gold – art manager
- Chris Galland – assistant
- Cameron Lister – assistant
- Ike Schultz – assistant
- Doctor Rosen Rosen – bass, drum programming, engineer, guitar, instrumentation, piano, producer, programming, synthesizer
- Ken Oak – cello
- Meg Myers – composer, guitar, percussion, vocals
- Andrew Robert Rosen – composer
- Matt Chamberlain – drums
- Sam Gallagher – drums
- Matt Bayles – engineer
- Cameron Graham – engineer
- Johannes Raassina – engineer
- Alex Todorov – engineer
- Ben Cassorla – acoustic guitar
- Mike Goldman – guitar, background vocals
- Steve Stevens – guitar
- Lauren Stockner – guitar
- Bianca Ortega – marketing coordinator
- Ryan Brady – marketing
- Brian "Busy" Dackowski – marketing
- Greg Calbi – mastering
- Caesar Edmunds – mixing engineer
- Ken Andrews – mixing
- Tony Hoffer – mixing
- John O'Mahony – mixing
- Manny Marroquin – mixing
- Alan Moulder – mixing
- Robert Orton – mixing
- Joe Visciano – mixing
- Joshua Skubel – packaging
- Joe Mullen – percussion
- Darren Ankenman – photography
- Catie Laffoon – photography
- Ethnikids – remixing
- Theodora "Teddy" Mae Rosen – toy instruments
- Maddie Ross – background vocals

== Charts ==
Chart (2015)	Peak position
US Billboard 200	79
US Top Alternative Albums	15
US Top Rock Albums	21

=== Singles ===
Title	Year	Peak chart positions					Album
Title	Year	US Alt.	US Rock Air.	POL	CZE	RUS	Album
"Desire"	2014	17	35	97	39	128	Sorry
"Sorry"	2015	16	26	—	115	—	Sorry
"Lemon Eyes"	2015	23	42	—	—	—	Sorry
"Motel"	2015	—	—	—	—	—	Sorry
"—" denotes a single that did not chart or was not released in that territory.
