= Heart of Ice (disambiguation) =

"Heart of Ice" is an episode of Batman: The Animated Series.

Heart of Ice may also refer to:

- "Heart of Ice", a two-part episode of Yu-Gi-Oh! GX
- "Heart of Ice", a fairy tale compiled in Andrew Lang's The Green Fairy Book
- "Heart of Ice", a 2022 song by BoyWithUke from Serotonin Dreams
- An alternative name for the Irish pop group Luv Bug
