= Alternative Airplay =

Billboard chart

Alternative Airplay (formerly known as Modern Rock Tracks between 1988 and 2009, and Alternative Songs between 2009 and 2020) is a music chart published in the American magazine Billboard since September 10, 1988. It ranks the 40 most-played songs on alternative and modern rock radio stations. Introduced as Modern Rock Tracks, the chart served as a companion to the Mainstream Rock chart (then called Album Rock Tracks), and its creation was prompted by the explosion of alternative music on American radio in the late 1980s. During the first several years of the chart, it regularly featured music that did not receive commercial radio airplay anywhere but on a few modern rock and college rock radio stations. This included many electronic and post-punk artists. Gradually, as alternative rock became more mainstream (spearheaded by the grunge explosion in the early 1990s), alternative and mainstream rock radio stations began playing many of the same songs. By the late 2000s, the genres became more fully differentiated with only limited crossover. The Alternative Airplay chart features more alternative rock, indie pop, and pop punk artists while the Mainstream Rock chart leans towards more guitar-tinged blues rock, hard rock, and heavy metal.

The chart is based solely on radio airplay ranked by a calculation of the total number of spins each song receives per week. As of 2012, approximately 80 alternative radio stations across the United States are electronically monitored 24 hours a day, seven days a week by Nielsen Broadcast Data Systems. The chart had 30 positions when it was introduced in September 1988 and expanded to 40 positions on September 10, 1994.

The chart was renamed to Alternative Songs beginning with the June 20, 2009, issue after Billboard fully absorbed Radio & Records, whose similar chart was called "Alternative" and to reflect the music industry's more common use of the term. In June 2020, Billboard introduced the separate Hot Alternative Songs chart, which uses similar methodology as the Billboard Hot 100 by measuring the popularity of songs classified as alternative across all radio formats, streaming services, and sales within the United States. To avoid confusion, Alternative Songs was renamed Alternative Airplay.

== History ==
The first alternative chart, called Modern Rock Tracks, appeared in the September 10, 1988, edition of Billboard magazine. The first number-one song of the chart was Siouxsie and the Banshees' "Peek-a-Boo", which topped the charts for two weeks. In the chart's early years, the chart was closely associated with college rock, new wave, post-punk and electronic genres with a large presence of British, Irish and Australian artists, as only 24 of the chart's first 82 number-one hits were by American acts. Bands such as Depeche Mode, R.E.M., the Cure, the B-52's, the Replacements, and Midnight Oil scored multiple number one hits on the chart in the late 1980s and early 1990s.

In 1991, with the release of "Smells Like Teen Spirit" by Nirvana (which reached No. 1 on November 23, 1991), grunge became a new form of alternative rock to chart. However, grunge did not have a dominating presence on the chart in its heyday; over time, grunge would grow into popularity as a representation of alternative rock in the mainstream. Iconic grunge songs fared decently on the Alternative Songs chart but better on the Mainstream Rock Songs. For example, "Black" by Pearl Jam peaked only at No. 20 on the former but No. 3 on the latter. This was because the college rock and new wave of the 1980s remained the dominant styles of the format, while grunge became an alternative rock style that was popular on the Mainstream Rock format.

In the mid-1990s, alternative rock songs began to crossover to Pop radio, with acts such as Green Day, the Offspring and Alanis Morissette being played on Pop stations after establishing hits on the Alternative chart. Dominant genres included pop punk and softer alternative rock, as grunge acts such as Soundgarden and Stone Temple Pilots did not reach No. 1, while Britpop, a form of alternative rock from the UK, was represented only by Oasis. By the late 1990s, the Alternative Songs chart was ruled by relatively lighter alternative rock bands such as Third Eye Blind, Matchbox Twenty and Sugar Ray and a plethora of one-hit wonders.

At the turn of the century, alternative radio embraced nu-metal/rap rock with bands including Korn, Limp Bizkit and most famously, Linkin Park. Chris Molanphy of Pitchfork stated that "possibly the most loathed period for music of the last half-century, the rap-rock years—when looked through the prism of the Modern Rock chart's evolution—are a logical endpoint to a decade when alt-culture steadily de-wussified itself." Garage rock from the likes of the White Stripes and the Strokes also became hits in the early 2000s as a counter to the over-aggression of rap rock.

In the mid-2000s, the Alternative charts were ruled at the top by its most dominant members. From 2003 to 2008, the No. 1 song was by either Foo Fighters, Green Day, Incubus, Linkin Park or Red Hot Chili Peppers 49% of the time – 152 out of 313 weeks. During this time, 1990s alternative groups such as Nine Inch Nails and Weezer enjoyed their biggest success, while emo (Jimmy Eat World), indie rock (Modest Mouse) and pop punk (Fall Out Boy) also were popular. In 2007, "The Kill" by Thirty Seconds to Mars set a record for the longest-running hit in the history of the US alternative chart when it remained on the national chart for 52 weeks. Rise Against's "Savior" later broke the record by spending 65 weeks, followed around the same time by "1901" from Phoenix at 57. In 2009, Billboard renamed the chart to "Alternative Songs".

In the 2010s, the Alternative charts were led by softer indie pop and folk, and crossed over new acts to pop radio for the first time since the late 1990s, such as Foster the People, Imagine Dragons, Fun, and Gotye. The chart also began to diverge from the Mainstream Rock chart, as only 10 of 40 songs were shared between the two in November 2012, compared to 23 of 40 in November 2002. For the chart's 25th anniversary in 2013, Billboard published a list of the 100 biggest hits in the history of the Alternative chart. "Uprising" by Muse was listed at No. 1, having spent 17 weeks on the top of the chart and 53 weeks in total. "Savior" by Rise Against was listed at No. 2, peaking at #3 but staying on the chart for a record-breaking 65 weeks.

On October 11, 2018, Billboard released its Greatest of All Time Alternative Songs 30th-anniversary recap. Foo Fighters continued its reign as the chart's No. 1 act over the list's first 30 years, after leading the 25th-anniversary recap. Muse's "Uprising" retained its standing as the all-time No. 1 song. Rise Against's "Savior" again ranked at No. 2, while Portugal. The Man's "Feel It Still" entered at No. 3, the highest debut on the 30th anniversary songs list, following its record 20-week reign in 2017. Four artists have charted at least once in the all five decades (1980s through 2020s) of the chart's existence: Nine Inch Nails, Depeche Mode, Red Hot Chili Peppers, and U2. Although the Alternative Songs chart "tends to be heavily male-dominated", Billboard released a list of the top-performing women in the chart's archives as part of the 30th anniversary of the Alternative Songs chart, with Dolores O'Riordan of the Cranberries taking the lead spot. The current number-one song on the chart is "Babydoll" by Dominic Fike.

== Chart achievements ==
=== Artists with the most number-one songs ===
| No. 1s | Artist | Source(s) |
|---|---|---|
| 15 | Red Hot Chili Peppers | |
| 14 | Linkin Park | |
| 14 | Twenty One Pilots | |
| 14 | Cage the Elephant | |
| 13 | Green Day | |
| 12 | Foo Fighters | |
| 9 | Weezer | |
| 8 | The Black Keys | |
| 8 | U2 | |
| 7 | Imagine Dragons | |

=== Acts who have reached number one in at least three decades ===
==== Four decades ====
Blink-182 (1990s, 2000s, 2010s, 2020s)
Foo Fighters (1990s, 2000s, 2010s, 2020s)
Green Day (1990s, 2000s, 2010s, 2020s)
Red Hot Chili Peppers (1990s, 2000s, 2010s, 2020s)

==== Three decades ====
Beck (1990s, 2000s, 2010s)
Coldplay (2000s, 2010s, 2020s)
Linkin Park (2000s, 2010s, 2020s)
Modest Mouse (2000s, 2010s, 2020s)
U2 (1980s, 1990s, 2000s)
Weezer (2000s, 2010s, 2020s)

=== Artists with the most cumulative weeks at number one ===
| Weeks at No. 1 | Artist | Source |
|---|---|---|
| 95 | Foo Fighters | |
| 91 | Red Hot Chili Peppers | |
| 84 | Linkin Park | |
| 80 | Twenty One Pilots | |
| 65 | Green Day | |
| 55 | Imagine Dragons | |
| 54 | Cage the Elephant | |
| 48 | Blink-182 | |
| 46 | Muse | |
| 44 | The Black Keys | |

=== Number-one debuts ===
- "What's the Frequency, Kenneth?" by R.E.M. (1994)
- "Dani California" by Red Hot Chili Peppers (2006)
- "What I've Done" by Linkin Park (2007)

=== Artists with the most top-ten songs ===
| Entries | Act | Source |
|---|---|---|
| 35 | Foo Fighters | |
| 28 | Green Day | |
| 28 | Red Hot Chili Peppers | |
| 23 | U2 | |
| 23 | Weezer | |
| 22 | Linkin Park | |
| 21 | Pearl Jam | |
| 21 | Twenty One Pilots | |
| 20 | The Offspring | |
| 19 | Cage the Elephant | |
| 18 | Muse | |

=== Artists with most chart entries ===
| Entries | Act | Source |
|---|---|---|
| 45 | Foo Fighters | |
| 45 | U2 | |
| 42 | Pearl Jam | |
| 40 | Green Day | |
| 37 | Red Hot Chili Peppers | |
| 36 | Weezer | |
| 34 | Linkin Park | |
| 32 | Coldplay | |
| 32 | The Offspring | |
| 30 | The Smashing Pumpkins | |

=== Songs with most weeks on the chart ===
| Weeks | Song | Artist | Source |
|---|---|---|---|
| 88 | "Monsters" | All Time Low featuring Blackbear | |
| 76 | "Broken" | Lovelytheband | |
| 65 | "Savior" | Rise Against | |
| 64 | "First" | Cold War Kids | |
| 63 | "Trampoline" | Shaed | |
| 58 | "Do I Wanna Know?" | Arctic Monkeys | |
| 57 | "1901" | Phoenix | |
| 56 | "Wish I Knew You" | The Revivalists | |
| 55 | "Sit Next to Me" | Foster the People | |
| 54 | "Enemy" | Imagine Dragons and JID | |
| 54 | "Too Sweet" | Hozier | |

=== Songs with most weeks at number one ===
| Weeks | Song | Artist | Year | Source(s) |
|---|---|---|---|---|
| 20 | "Feel It Still" | Portugal. The Man | 2017 | |
| 20 | "One More Time" | Blink-182 | 2023–24 | |
| 19 | "Madness" | Muse | 2012–13 | |
| 18 | "The Pretender" | Foo Fighters | 2007 | |
| 18 | "Monsters" | All Time Low featuring Blackbear | 2020–21 | |
| 17 | "Uprising" | Muse | 2009–10 | |
| 16 | "Scar Tissue" | Red Hot Chili Peppers | 1999 | |
| 16 | "It's Been Awhile" | Staind | 2001 | |
| 16 | "Boulevard of Broken Dreams" | Green Day | 2004–05 | |
| 16 | "High Hopes" | Panic! at the Disco | 2018–19 | |

=== Songs that have taken the longest time to reach number one ===
| Weeks | Song | Artist | Source |
|---|---|---|---|
| 42 | "Running Up That Hill" | Meg Myers | |
| 33 | "Out of My League" | Fitz and the Tantrums | |
| 33 | "Novocaine" | The Unlikely Candidates | |
| 32 | "Just Pretend" | Bad Omens | |
| 32 | "Mountain at My Gates" | Foals | |
| 32 | "Animal" | Neon Trees | |
| 31 | "Toxic" | BoyWithUke | |
| 31 | "1901" | Phoenix | |
| 30 | "Dissolve" | Absofacto | |
| 29 | "Feel Good Drag" | Anberlin | |
| 29 | "Back Against the Wall" | Cage the Elephant | |
| 29 | "Safe and Sound" | Capital Cities | |
| 29 | "Little Talks" | Of Monsters and Men | |
| 29 | "Records" | Weezer | |
| 29 | "God Needs the Devil" | Jonah Kagen | |

=== Albums with at least three number ones ===
5 songs

Meteora – Linkin Park ("Somewhere I Belong", "Faint", "Numb", "Lying from You", "Breaking the Habit", 2003–04)

3 songs

Neon Pill – Cage the Elephant ("Neon Pill", "Rainbow", "Metaverse", 2024–25)
Scaled and Icy – Twenty One Pilots ("Shy Away", "Saturday", "The Outside", 2021–22)
Social Cues – Cage the Elephant ("Ready to Let Go", "Social Cues", "Skin and Bones", 2019–21)
Trench – Twenty One Pilots ("Jumpsuit", "Chlorine", "The Hype", 2018–19)
Evolve – Imagine Dragons ("Believer", "Thunder", "Whatever It Takes", 2017–18)
Only by the Night – Kings of Leon ("Sex on Fire", "Use Somebody", "Notion", 2008–09)
Echoes, Silence, Patience & Grace – Foo Fighters ("The Pretender", "Long Road to Ruin", "Let It Die", 2007–08)
Stadium Arcadium – Red Hot Chili Peppers ("Dani California", "Tell Me Baby", "Snow (Hey Oh)", 2006–07)
With Teeth – Nine Inch Nails ("The Hand That Feeds", "Only", "Every Day Is Exactly the Same", 2005–06)
American Idiot – Green Day ("American Idiot", "Boulevard of Broken Dreams", "Holiday", 2004–05)
Californication – Red Hot Chili Peppers ("Scar Tissue", "Otherside", "Californication", 1999–2000)
Jagged Little Pill – Alanis Morissette ("You Oughta Know", "Hand in My Pocket", "Ironic", 1995–96)
Dookie – Green Day ("Longview", "Basket Case", "When I Come Around", 1994–95)
Achtung Baby – U2 ("The Fly", "Mysterious Ways", "One", 1991–92)

=== Top female performers (1988–2018) ===
Source: (Note: "The Top 30 Female Alternative Songs Artists ranking is based on weekly performance on the Alternative Songs chart from its September 10, 1988, inception through September 8, 2018".)

| Position | Artist |
|---|---|
| 1 | Dolores O'Riordan (The Cranberries) |
| 2 | Meg White (The White Stripes) |
| 3 | Siouxsie Sioux (Siouxsie & the Banshees) |
| 4 | Shirley Manson (Garbage) |
| 5 | Alanis Morissette |
| 6 | Kate Pierson and Cindy Wilson (The B-52s) |
| 7 | Gwen Stefani (No Doubt) |
| 8 | Natalie Merchant (Note: "Mary Ramsey replaced Merchant in 1993, though all of the band's Alternative Songs entries were in the Merchant era".) (10,000 Maniacs) |
| 9 | Nanna Bryndís Hilmarsdóttir (Of Monsters and Men) |
| 10 | Hannah Hooper (Grouplove) |

== Other chart achievements ==
- Blink-182's album One More Time... has generated songs with the highest total number of weeks spent at number one, with thirty-three weeks total. Red Hot Chili Peppers' album Californication and Linkin Park's album Meteora come next with thirty weeks each.
- Sublime have had the longest time between number-ones (28 years, 10 months), with "What I Got" (1996) and "Ensenada" (2025). The record was previously held by Sum 41, who waited 22 years, 5 months and 3 weeks, between "Fat Lip" (2001) and "Landmines" (2023) for their next number one.
- The band to have the most charted songs without reaching number one is Korn, with 21.
- Fifteen songs released on an independent record label have reached number one on the chart. The first three were "Come Out and Play" by The Offspring, "What It's Like" by Everlast and "Panic Switch" by Silversun Pickups. These were followed by "1901" by Phoenix, "Lay Me Down" by The Dirty Heads featuring Rome Ramirez, "Do I Wanna Know?" by Arctic Monkeys, "Hollow Moon (Bad Wolf)" by Awolnation, "The Sound of Winter" by Bush, "First" by Cold War Kids, "Bored to Death" by Blink-182, "Take It All Back" by Judah & the Lion, "No Roots" by Alice Merton, "Sober Up" by AJR featuring Rivers Cuomo, "Trampoline" by Shaed and "Running Up That Hill" by Meg Myers.
- Although Soundgarden's "Black Hole Sun" did not hit number one on the chart, peaking at number two on July 2, 1994, it became the Modern Rock Tracks year-end number one single of 1994, the only song to do so without ever being number one on the weekly chart.
- In August 2013, Lorde became the first woman to top the chart since Tracy Bonham in 1996 when her song "Royals" reached number one in August 2013; the next woman to top the chart was Elle King with her song "Ex's & Oh's" which hit the top spot in September 2015. In September 2013, Lorde surpassed Alanis Morissette to become the woman with the longest-running single at number one when "Royals" spent its sixth week at number one. Since then, five other women have also topped the chart (Alice Merton (2018), Lana Del Rey (2019), Billie Eilish (2019), Meg Myers (2020), and Lola Young (2025)), as have female-fronted bands Shaed (2019), Cannons (2021), and Paramore (2023).
- Lorde is the youngest solo artist to reach number one, achieving this feat at the age of 16 with "Royals".
- Billie Eilish holds the records for most number ones on the chart for a soloist and most number ones for a female artist or band with female vocals, having topped the chart four times.
- Good Charlotte holds the record for the longest wait between their first entry and their first number one single on the chart. 25 years, seven months, and one week separated the debut of "Little Things" in September 2000 and the ascension of "Bedroom Posters", credited to Yellowcard featuring Good Charlotte, to the pole position in May 2026. Yellowcard holds the record for the longest wait for a lead artist: 21 years, 11 months, and three weeks between the debut of "Way Away" in September 2003 and the ascension of "Better Days" in August 2025.
- Debbie Harry holds the record for the longest gap between entries on the chart: "Kiss It Better" last appeared on the chart in January 1990 and she did not reappear again until a featured credit on "Soul Train" by Just Loud in December 2018, 29 years later. Kate Bush has the longest gap between entries for a lead artist: "Rubberband Girl" last appeared on the chart in January 1994, and she did not chart again until a re-release of her 1985 single "Running Up That Hill", which debuted on the chart 28 years later in June 2022. Blur has the longest gap between entries for a band: "Crazy Beat" last appeared on the chart in May 2003, and they did not chart again until "The Narcissist" debuted on the chart 20 years later in June 2023.

== See also ==
- List of Billboard number-one alternative hits
