= Chandol (singer) =

American alternative singer (born 2002)

- Also known as: BoyWithUke
- Born: Charley Yang; August 25, 2002 (age 24); Daegu, South Korea
- Origin: Shrewsbury, Massachusetts, U.S.
- Genres: Alternative pop; emo rap; rock
- Occupations: Singer; songwriter; producer; musician
- Instruments: Ukulele; vocals; guitar; piano; cello
- Years active: 2020–present
- Labels: AWAL (current); Republic; Mercury (former)
- Website: boywithukemusic.com

Charley Yang, known professionally as Chandol (stylized as chandol) and formerly known as BoyWithUke, is an American singer, musician and internet personality. Yang first gained popularity on the online platform TikTok as BoyWithUke with his song "Two Moons", and later "Toxic", "IDGAF" and "Understand". Until October 10, 2023, he was known for hiding his face behind an LED mask. He is currently an independent artist after leaving Mercury Records.

== Early life ==
During his performance in Seoul Jazz Festival, Yang revealed that he was born in Daegu, South Korea.

Yang went to Oak Middle School in Shrewsbury, Massachusetts, and also attended Shrewsbury High School. He stated that he was forced into classical music from the age of four, but later dropped it. This was followed by him resuming music through writing music in high school.

== Career ==
=== 2020–2021: Beginnings on TikTok and early albums ===
Yang began uploading to TikTok in 2020 after being introduced to the platform by his brother. His content did not attract much attention on the platform until 2021, when several of his videos (including a series of videos entitled "Minute-Long Songs") started to gain popularity.

In September 2021, Yang released his extended play Faded. Later, the song Toxic went viral on TikTok and was featured in over sixty-nine thousand videos on the platform. It was streamed around half a billion times. The single reached No. 1 on the Billboard Alternative Airplay charts after being on the charts for thirty-one consecutive weeks, which was the sixth-longest rise to No. 1 in Alternative Airplay's history. "Toxic" was certified silver by the British Phonographic Industry (BPI) and platinum by the Recording Industry Association of America (RIAA).

In 2021, BoyWithUke released his first and second studio albums, Melatonin Dreams and Fever Dreams respectively.

=== 2021–2022: Signing with Republic Records and Serotonin Dreams ===
In late 2021, Yang signed a deal with record label Republic Records. In 2022, he released the single "IDGAF", featuring Blackbear. He released his debut major-label album, Serotonin Dreams, under Republic Records. It debuted at No. 7 on the Billboard Alternative Airplay and Billboard 200 charts and features "Toxic" as its lead single. After the album's release, BoyWithUke was listed as one of the top ten Billboard Emerging Artists. On September 30, 2022, he released the single "Sick of U" featuring Oliver Tree.

Throughout 2022, Yang opened for the indie-pop trio AJR on their tour for their fourth studio album OK Orchestra.

=== 2023–2024: Lucid Dreams and face reveal ===
Yang released his extended play Antisocial on February 24, 2023. It contains three songs, including the single "Rockstar", which was released on February 10, as well as two songs that had previously been teased on his TikTok, "IDTWCBF (Friends)" and "Nosedive". On April 7, 2023, BoyWithUke released another single, "Out of Reach", which is the full version of one of his minute-long songs on TikTok. He also debuted the single in a Roblox concert which also featured "Toxic", and "IDGAF".

BoyWithUke later released "Trauma" as a single on August 3, 2023.

BoyWithUke's fourth album, Lucid Dreams, was released on October 6, 2023. It was preceded by the singles "Rockstar", "Trauma" and "Migraine", with "Problematic" being released as a single on the album's release day. BoyWithUke has claimed that Lucid Dreams will be the last album of the "Dreams" saga.

BoyWithUke first revealed his face on October 9, 2023, at the end of his music video for "Homesick". On an Instagram post, the next day, he revealed his face and name. In the same post, he found that the mask gave him confidence in the past, but now it was negatively affecting his physical and mental health. BoyWithUke also expressed his plans to start a new chapter of his music without a mask. Yang also said that he kept his identity hidden in order for people to pay attention to his musical talent and not his appearance.

=== 2024–2025: Burnout and retirement ===
After releasing the first single, called "Can You Feel It?", for his album Burnout, Yang announced that it will be the last album of his under the name BoyWithUke. In November 2024, he uploaded a comedy video interviewing himself, to his YouTube channel, in which he mentions why he wanted this change. He also mentions the discontinuation with his label.

His album Burnout was released under AWAL Recordings on November 15, 2024. Following Burnout, Yang's new stage name will be Chandol.

Yang has stated that Chandol used to be his legal name, but changed it to Charley after people "thought it was weird."

His final album, "BoyWithUke: B Sides", was released on September 5, 2025. This album contains a select compilation of scrapped songs from his earlier days. The album marks the end of his identity associated behind the mask and the name "BoyWithUke".

=== 2026–present: Beginnings of chandol ===
==== Mercurial ====
After being silent on social media since the release of BoyWithUke: B Sides, besides a few Instagram story posts, Yang posted a video on YouTube, Instagram, TikTok, and X through his chandol accounts titled TELL ME ABOUT YOURSELF, which was later retitled to chandol - AVALON, making this the official music video for his song Avalon. The video is a 1-minute teaser of his upcoming music. The video features many references to his Asian heritage, including a 100 Japanese yen coin, some Korean text written in the Hangul alphabet, and a packaged Korean beverage, appearing to be Black Sesame & Bean Soy Milk. Yang also does chemical tests on rocks at the beginning of the video. He then plays with a Hot Wheels track. Yang then looks at his hand as the camera zooms in on it to show liquid mercury dripping from it. The next scene shows a sequence of shots of Yang and his brother, Harris, playing soccer in a grassy field at either sunset or sunrise. After that, birds flying over water is shown as Yang's face slowly fades in as the video blurs and text saying "mercurial" appears on screen. This led fans to speculate that chandol's first album will be named mercurial, which refers to something that is changeable.

On May 22, 2026, Yang shadow-dropped a single titled Breakfast in Bed on music streaming platforms. This song was teased and worked on during his Twitch streams in early 2025.

On June 12, 2026, Yang once again shadow-dropped a single, this time titled 2002, on music platforms.

Yang then released What's the Rush? two weeks later on June 26.

On July 6, 2026, he revealed his upcoming album, Mercurial, which released on July 10, 2026.

==== and uh ====
On an interview with entertainment magazine Sweety High, published August 13, 2026, Yang was asked, "Is there anything else we should know about you or the album right now?" to which he replied, "Yeah. The album’s old music now, and new stuff is coming soon. I’m trying to curate a nice fall sound for this autumn. It’ll be less all over the place, more one genre for the next project, I think." This led the community to start guessing what he would release.

On October 26, Yang posted a video on Instagram of himself making a collage with an instrumental in the background. The video was captioned, "and uh, yeah. probably tonight." Later that night, Yang released the extended play titled "and uh." The EP composes of five songs, totaling 14 minutes. The songs featured on the EP are What's Next?, Check Up, C'est La Vie, Yerba Mate, and Ego. Each song is two to three minutes long, with Ego being the outlier at four minutes.

== Artistry ==
Until October 2023, Yang wore an opaque face shield with two large LED lights to ensure his anonymity. His music is centered around the ukulele but also incorporates other instruments such as the piano. He self-composed his music on GarageBand from his iPad until 2024, and now uses Logic Pro on a MacBook.

Yang's music has been described as "alternative" and "alt-pop".

Yang's first four albums all contain the word "dreams" in their titles. Melatonin Dreams spoke heavily about depression and suicidal thoughts. Fever Dreams focuses on low self-esteem and generally melancholic and depressed themes. Serotonin Dreams is supposedly him "waking up" and the "Magnum Opus" of the saga as overall unlike its antecedent, Serotonin Dreams focuses on realization and generally more positive values, while still having occasional references to the importance of its predecessors. His album, Lucid Dreams, is intended to symbolize his "desires, his fear, his past, and his dreams."

== Discography ==
=== Albums released as BoyWithUke ===
Title	Details	Peak chart positions										Certifications
Title	Details	US	AUS	AUT	CAN	IRE	NLD	NOR	NZ	SWI	UK	Certifications
Melatonin Dreams	Released: January 22, 2021; Label: Self-released; Formats: Digital download, streaming	—	—	—	—	—	—	—	—	—	—	
Fever Dreams	Released: June 4, 2021; Label: Self-released; Formats: Digital download, streaming	—	—	—	—	—	—	—	—	—	—	
Serotonin Dreams	Released: May 6, 2022; Label: Republic; Formats: CD, digital download, streaming	72	64	48	33	51	72	21	35	61	43	BPI: Silver
Lucid Dreams	Released: October 6, 2023; Label: Republic; Formats: CD, digital download, streaming, vinyl	—	—	—	—	—	—	—	—	—	—	
Burnout	Released: November 15, 2024; Label: AWAL; Formats: CD, digital download, streaming, vinyl	—	—	—	—	—	—	—	—	—	—	
BoyWithUke: B Sides	Released: September 5, 2025; Label: Self-released; Formats: Digital download, streaming	—	—	—	—	—	—	—	—	—	—	
"—" denotes a recording that did not chart or was not released in that territory.

=== EPs released as BoyWithUke ===
List of extended plays
Title	Details
Trouvaille	Released: March 5, 2021; Label: Self-released; Formats: Digital download, streaming
Faded	Released: September 10, 2021; Label: Self-released; Formats: Digital download, streaming
Antisocial	Released: February 24, 2023; Label: Republic; Formats: Digital download, streaming

=== Singles released as BoyWithUke ===
Title	Year	Peak chart positions										Certifications	Album
Title	Year	US	AUS	AUT	CAN	GER	IRE	NOR	SWI	UK	WW	Certifications	Album
"Two Moons"	2021	—	—	41	—	—	—	—	66	—	—	RIAA: Gold; MC: Gold	Fever Dreams
"Toxic"	2021	— (Note: "Toxic" did not enter the Billboard Hot 100, but peaked at number 18 on the Bubbling Under Hot 100 chart.)	98	20	71	29	72	32	25	62	60	RIAA: Platinum; BPI: Gold; BVMI: Gold; MC: Platinum	Serotonin Dreams
"Long Drives"	2022	—	—	—	—	—	—	—	—	—	—		Serotonin Dreams
"IDGAF" (featuring Blackbear)	2022	99	95	69	61	—	52	—	—	48	117	RIAA: Platinum; BPI: Silver; MC: Gold	Serotonin Dreams
"Sick of U" (featuring Oliver Tree)	2022	—	—	—	—	—	—	—	—	—	—		Non-album single
"Rockstar"	2023	—	—	—	—	—	—	—	—	—	—		Lucid Dreams
"Out of Reach"	2023	—	—	—	—	—	—	—	—	—	—		Non-album single
"Trauma"	2023	—	—	—	—	—	—	—	—	—	—		Lucid Dreams
"Migraine"	2023	—	—	—	—	—	—	—	—	—	—		Lucid Dreams
"Problematic"	2023	—	—	—	—	—	—	—	—	—	—		Lucid Dreams
"Can You Feel It?"	2024	—	—	—	—	—	—	—	—	—	—		Burnout
"Ghost"	2024	—	—	—	—	—	—	—	—	—	—		Burnout
"Gaslight"	2024	—	—	—	—	—	—	—	—	—	—		Burnout
"—" denotes a recording that did not chart or was not released in that territory.

=== Singles released as chandol ===
Title	Year	Peak chart positions										Certifications	Album
Title	Year	US	AUS	AUT	CAN	GER	IRE	NOR	SWI	UK	WW	Certifications	Album
"Breakfast in Bed"	2026	—	—	—	—	—	—	—	—	—	—		Mercurial
"2002"	2026	—	—	—	—	—	—	—	—	—	—		Mercurial
"What's the Rush?"	2026	—	—	—	—	—	—	—	—	—	—		Mercurial
"—" denotes a recording that did not chart or was not released in that territory.

=== EPs released as chandol ===
Title	Details
and uh	Released: October 27, 2026; Label: Self-released; Formats: Digital download, streaming

=== Albums released as chandol ===
Title	Details	Peak chart positions										Certifications
Title	Details	US	AUS	AUT	CAN	IRE	NLD	NOR	NZ	SWI	UK	Certifications
Mercurial	Released: July 10, 2026; Label: Self-released; Formats: Digital download, streaming	—	—	—	—	—	—	—	—	—	—	
"—" denotes a recording that did not chart or was not released in that territory.

== Awards and nominations ==
Award	Year	Nominee	Category	Result	Ref.
iHeartRadio Music Awards	2023	Himself	Best New Artist (Alternative & Rock)	Nominated	
