= Make a Shadow =

EP by Meg Myers
- Released: February 7, 2014
- Genre: Pop rock
- Length: 19:37
- Label: Atlantic
- Producer: Andrew Rosen

Meg Myers chronology
Daughter in the Choir (2012)	Make a Shadow (2014)	Sorry (2015)

Singles from Make a Shadow
- 1. "Heart Heart Head" Released: April 30, 2013; 2. "Desire" Released: September 9, 2013

Make a Shadow is the second extended play (EP) and debut major-label release by American singer-songwriter Meg Myers. It was released on February 7, 2014, by Atlantic Records. It serves as her first release under a major label after signing to Atlantic in 2012. The first single from Make a Shadow, "Heart Heart Head", was released on April 30, 2013. The second and final single "Desire" was released on September 9, 2013.

== Background ==
Myers originally released her debut EP Daughter in the Choir independently in March 2012. It garnered positive reviews from websites such as LA Weekly. Later that year, it was announced that she had signed with Atlantic Records.

== Singles ==
"Heart Heart Head" was released as Myers' debut single and Make a Shadow's lead single on April 30, 2013. Artist Direct rated the song five out of five stars, describing the track as an "inviting intensity" while praising Myers' vocals. The song's music video premiered the same day to positive reception. The magazine Complex described the music video as "well-reflected", while describing the song itself as "dark".

"Desire" was released on September 9, 2013, as the EP's second and final single. Miles Bowe of Stereogum gave a positive review of the song, stating that it "juggles the pretty and the ugly", while also praising Myers' vocals.

== Track listing ==
Track listing
No.	Title	Writer(s)	Producer(s)	Length
1.	"Desire"	Meg Myers; Andrew Robert Rosen	Doctor Rosen Rosen	4:44
2.	"Go"	Myers; Rosen	Doctor Rosen Rosen	2:57
3.	"Make a Shadow"	Myers; Rosen	Doctor Rosen Rosen	4:22
4.	"Heart Heart Head"	Myers; Rosen	Doctor Rosen Rosen	4:11
5.	"The Morning After"	Myers; Rosen	Doctor Rosen Rosen	3:23
Total length:				19:37

== Release history ==
Region	Date	Format(s)	Label	Ref.
United States	February 7, 2014	Digital download, CD	Atlantic	

== Charts ==
Chart (2014)	Peak position
US Heatseekers Albums (Billboard)	36
