= IDGAF (BoyWithUke song) =

Single by BoyWithUke featuring Blackbear

from the album Serotonin Dreams
- Released: March 18, 2022
- Length: 2:20
- Label: Republic
- Songwriters: BoyWithUke; Matthew Musto
- Producers: BoyWithUke; Andrew Goldstein

BoyWithUke singles chronology
"Long Drives" (2022)	"IDGAF" (2022)	"Sick of U" (2022)

Blackbear singles chronology
"Love It When You Hate Me" (2022)	"IDGAF" (2022)	"Make Up Sex" (2022)

Lyric video
- "IDGAF" on YouTube

"IDGAF" is a song by American singer BoyWithUke featuring Blackbear, released as the third single from BoyWithUke's album Serotonin Dreams on March 18, 2022. BoyWithUke co-wrote the song with Blackbear, and it was produced by BoyWithUke and Andrew Goldstein.

== Content ==
"IDGAF" was described by Billboard as "a gently heartbroken kiss-off anthem about moving on from a toxic ex, even when you're clearly still smarting from the breakup".

== Charts ==
=== Weekly charts ===
Weekly chart performance for "IDGAF"
Chart (2022)	Peak position
Australia (ARIA)	95
Austria (Ö3 Austria Top 40)	69
Canada Hot 100 (Billboard)	61
Global 200 (Billboard)	117
Ireland (IRMA)	52
New Zealand Hot Singles (RMNZ)	2
UK Singles (OCC)	48
US Billboard Hot 100	99
US Hot Rock & Alternative Songs (Billboard)	11

=== Year-end charts ===
2022 year-end chart performance for "IDGAF"
Chart (2022)	Position
US Hot Rock & Alternative Songs (Billboard)	32

== Certifications ==
Certifications for "IDGAF"
Region	Certification	Certified units/sales
Brazil (Pro-Música Brasil)	Gold	20,000^{‡}
Canada (Music Canada)	Gold	40,000^{‡}
New Zealand (RMNZ)	Gold	15,000^{‡}
United Kingdom (BPI)	Silver	200,000^{‡}
United States (RIAA)	Platinum	1,000,000^{‡}
^{‡} Sales+streaming figures based on certification alone.
