= Take Me to the Disco =

Studio album by Meg Myers
- Released: July 20, 2018
- Genre: Alternative rock; pop; disco; techno
- Length: 46:12
- Label: 300 Entertainment
- Producer: Christian "Leggy" Langdon

Meg Myers chronology
Sorry (2015)	Take Me to the Disco (2018)	Thank U 4 Taking Me 2 The Disco (2020)

Singles from Take Me to the Disco
- 1. "Numb" Released: May 21, 2018; 2. "Take Me to the Disco" Released: May 31, 2018; 3. "Jealous Sea" Released: June 27, 2019

Professional ratings
Review scores
Source	Rating
Sputnikmusic	2.3/5
Immortal Reviews	78/100
Associated Press	positive
L.A. Times HS Insider	6.5/10

Take Me to the Disco is the second studio album recorded by American singer-songwriter Meg Myers. The album was released on July 20, 2018 by 300 Entertainment.

== Background ==
The album includes the lead single "Numb", which was released on April 27, 2018. On June 1, the title track was released as the second single. The third single from the album, "Jealous Sea", was released on June 28. The fourth single "Tourniquet" was released July 13, a week prior to the album's release.

Myers worked with producer Christian "Leggy" Langdon on the album, recording it mostly at his studio in Topanga. All her previous works were produced by Doctor Rosen Rosen. After completing work on the album, Myers and Atlantic Records mutually parted ways. She brought the completed album to New York based indie label 300 Entertainment.

== Song information ==
"Numb" was written about Myers' former record label, Atlantic Records. Myers stated "They’re a very radio single-driven label, and we were under pressure at the time. But that’s not me. The radio has certainly helped my career, but that’s not a focus for me. My focus is to create and then to give it to my fans. To experiment and speak from my heart, sonically or visually. So when I wrote that, I reached a point where I felt like the constant search for a radio single was ridiculous. And when I finished, I was like “we have it! We have a radio single, and it happens to be about them.” It wasn’t written as a woman against men, but more of what I was going through as a person."

== Track listing ==
No.	Title	Writer(s)	Length
1.	"Take Me to the Disco"	Meg Myers; Christian Langdon	3:53
2.	"Numb"	Myers; Langdon	4:22
3.	"Tourniquet"	Myers; Langdon	4:23
4.	"Tear Me to Pieces"	Myers; Dave Bassett	3:26
5.	"Jealous Sea"	Myers; Langdon; Michael Goldman	4:41
6.	"The Death of Me"	Myers; Langdon	4:14
7.	"Some People"	Myers; Langdon; Jennifer Decilveo	3:56
8.	"Done"	Myers; Langdon	3:26
9.	"I'm Not Sorry"	Myers; Isaac Drake	3:02
10.	"Little Black Death"	Myers; Langdon	4:02
11.	"Funeral"	Myers; Langdon	4:09
12.	"Constant"	Myers	2:38
Total length:			46:12

== Charts ==
Chart (2018)	Peak position
US Billboard 200	182
US Top Album Sales (Billboard)	20
US Top Alternative Albums (Billboard)	17
US Top Rock Albums (Billboard)	40
