= Pub Choir =

Australian musical act

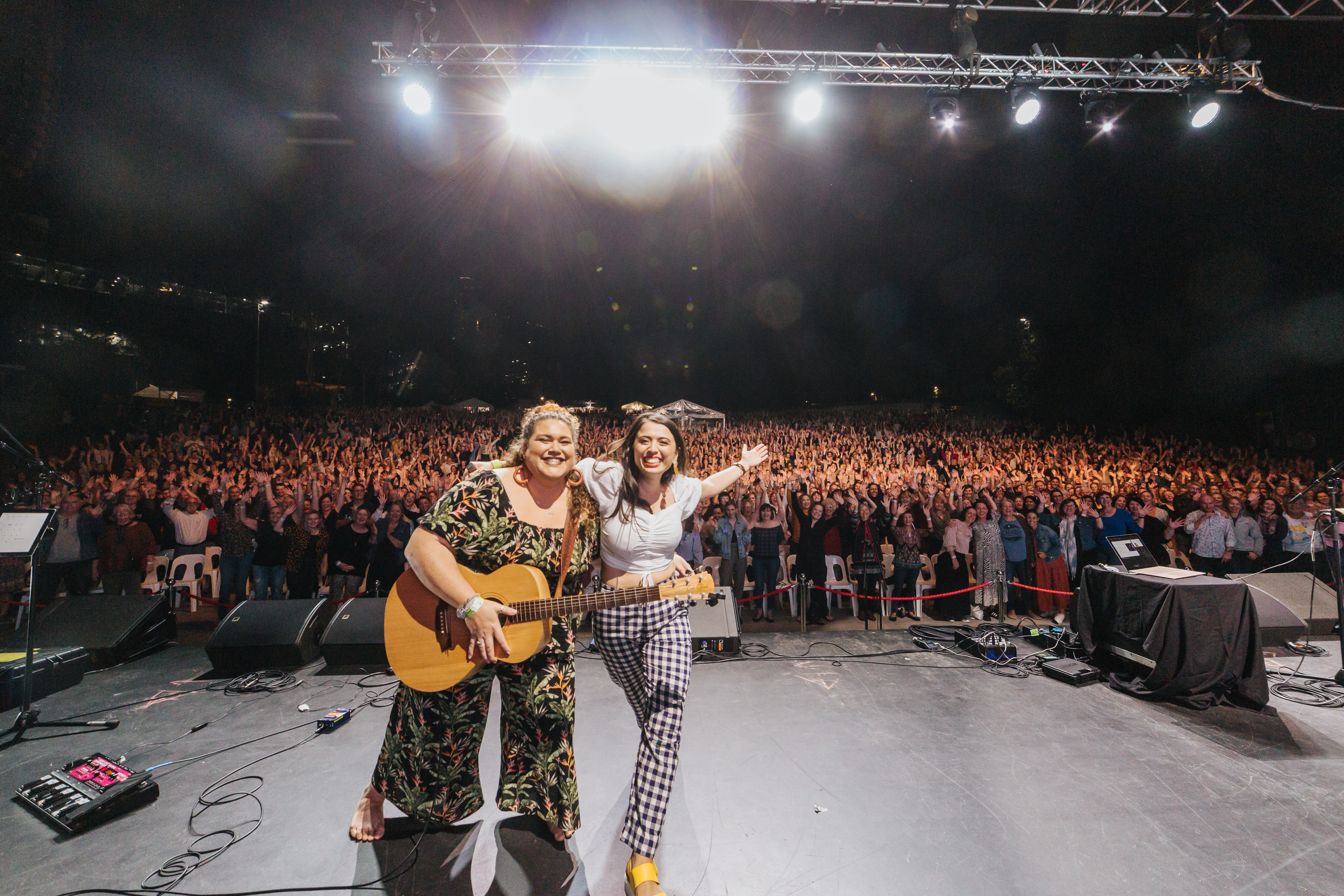
- Astrid Jorgensen and Waveney Yasso at Riverstage, Brisbane May 2021

Background information
- Origin: Brisbane, Australia
- Genres: Choral Music, Popular Music
- Years active: 2017–present
- Website: www.pubchoir.com.au

Pub Choir is a musical act founded in Brisbane, Australia, directed by Astrid Jorgensen.

At each Pub Choir event, Jorgensen arranges a popular song and teaches it to the audience in three-part harmony, concluding with a performance that is filmed and shared on social media. There is no formal recurring membership; participants purchase tickets to attend each individual production, which is usually held at a licensed venue.

== Background ==
The first Pub Choir event was held in West End, Brisbane at venue The Bearded Lady in March 2017. At the inaugural event 80 attendees learned Jorgensen's arrangement of "Slice of Heaven" by Dave Dobbyn. Jorgensen founded Pub Choir "to help regular people reclaim music in their lives, free of pressure or judgement".

In November 2017 Pub Choir's rendition of Zombie by The Cranberries went viral on the internet, and was shared by the band themselves shortly after the death of lead singer, Dolores O’Riordan. Other artists including Mariah Carey, Radiohead, Sir Barry Gibb, The Killers and Kiss have also praised and shared Pub Choir's arrangements of their songs. In 2022, Pub Choir's video of "Running Up That Hill" garnered international media attention when Kate Bush shared a statement describing the performance as "utterly, utterly wonderful!".

Pub Choir has held events widely around Australia, as well as in New Zealand, the United States and England. On 5 April 2018 Pub Choir performed at the 2018 Commonwealth Games. On 20 July 2019 Pub Choir performed at Splendour In The Grass.

Jorgensen created a form of musical notation incorporating colour-coded contoured text and comedic visual cues to teach at Pub Choir, so that musical literacy is not required for audience participation.

The term Pub Choir was coined by Jorgensen, and is trademarked.

== Special guests ==
Pub Choir has featured guest appearances by several notable musicians and celebrities. The first guest appearance in March 2018 by John Collins of Powderfinger for a performance of "My Happiness" received significant media attention, with a three-page feature in The Australian by journalist Andrew McMillen and a long-form radio piece on ABC's Radio National Breakfast program, hosted by Fran Kelly.

In 2018 other notable musical guests included:

- Chris Cheney of The Living End
- Felix Riebl of The Cat Empire
- Ben Ely of Regurgitator
- John Willsteed and Adele Pickvance formerly of The Go-Betweens

In 2019 musical guests included:

- Patience Hodgson of The Grates
- Ella Hooper of Killing Heidi
- Samuel Cromack of Ball Park Music
- Danielle Caruana of Mama Kin
- Tania Doko of Bachelor Girl
- Shane Howard of Goanna
- Darren Middleton of Powderfinger
- Lior
- Meg Mac
- Jim Moginie of Midnight Oil
- Ben Lee

In 2020 musical guests included:

- Paul Kelly

In 2022 guests included:

- Tim Freedman of The Whitlams
- Judith Lucy
- Mark Gable of The Choirboys
- Jason Singh of Taxiride

In 2018 Pub Choir was featured in Hit Network's national advertising campaign, with multiple presenters appearing at shows including Grant Denyer, Dave Hughes, Kate Langbroek, and Ed Kavalee.

== Philanthropy ==
Pub Choir has regularly partnered with local charities, often donating a portion of ticket sales and raising money at events.

In 2018 Pub Choir raised over $19,000 for the charity MND and Me in honour of Pub Choir regular attendee, John Hanley. Subsequently, John Hanley's involvement with Pub Choir caught the attention of ABC TV producers for the show "The Recording Studio", in which Hanley was featured in the inaugural episode on 16 April 2019.

On 20 December 2018 Pub Choir sold out a Christmas event at Brisbane City Hall for a performance of "How to Make Gravy" by Paul Kelly. Samuel Johnson (OAM) was the guest speaker, and the event raised over $108,000 for Samuel's charity, "Love Your Sister". In 2019, Pub Choir’s Christmas event raised over $134,000 for Women’s Legal Service Queensland. Pub Choir has continued to support the organisation and, as of 2024, has raised over $500,000.

On 14 June 2019 Jorgensen was awarded the Queensland Community Foundation Emerging Philanthropist of the Year as a result of her charitable work with Pub Choir.

== Couch Choir ==
During the 2020 COVID-19 pandemic a virtual choir named Couch Choir was created as an online equivalent of Pub Choir. In July 2020 it created a video including 1,534 contributions from people in 40 countries. In 2020, Couch Choir's video performance of Close to You by The Carpenters was added to the collection of the Australian National Communications Museum. Couch Choir's 2020 Christmas video of All I Want For Christmas Is You featured the Queensland Symphony Orchestra and was shared online by Mariah Carey, raising over $31,000 for the charity GIVIT.

== Australia's Biggest Singalong! ==
The inaugural television special Australia's Biggest Singalong! was broadcast live on SBS from the Sydney Town Hall on 5 June 2021. The two-hour special was co-created by Pub Choir in collaboration with Artemis Media and SBS and was hosted by Julia Zemiro and Miranda Tapsell. Throughout the interactive special, Jorgensen and Yasso taught the live audience and home viewers a vocal arrangement of "Throw Your Arms Around Me" by Hunters & Collectors in real-time, with guest performances by Dami Im and Mitch Tambo. The show culminated in a final performance which was accompanied by Mark Seymour.

== See also ==
- Choir! Choir! Choir!, similar project founded in Canada in 2011
