= Toxic (BoyWithUke song) =

Single by BoyWithUke
- Released: October 29, 2021
- Genre: Alt-pop
- Length: 2:48
- Label: Self-released; Republic
- Songwriter: BoyWithUke
- Producer: BoyWithUke

BoyWithUke singles chronology
"Two Moons" (2021)	"Toxic" (2021)	"Long Drives" (2022)

Lyric video
- "Toxic" on YouTube

"Toxic" is a song by Korean-American singer BoyWithUke (now known as Chandol). Originally self-released as a single on October 29, 2021, it appeared as the 11th song on the album Serotonin Dreams in May 6th, 2022. BoyWithUke wrote and produced the song himself, but the album it appeared on was released through Republic Records. It went viral on TikTok and received over 1 billion streams worldwide.

== Composition and lyrics ==
The song features BoyWithUke singing about how "all [his] friends are toxic", dubbing them "so rude and always negative" and explores ideas of loneliness with his lyrics stating that whilst he may be better off by himself, he feels "kinda empty without somebody else". Unlike some of his prior songs that had been inspired by ideas from TikTok comments, BoyWithUke wrote it "because it was an important thing in [his] life at the time". As with all of his songs, it was produced on his iPad using GarageBand.

== Charts ==
=== Weekly charts ===
Weekly chart performance for "Toxic"
Chart (2021–2022)	Peak position
Australia (ARIA)	98
Austria (Ö3 Austria Top 40)	20
Canada (Canadian Hot 100)	71
France (SNEP)	177
Germany (GfK)	29
Global 200 (Billboard)	60
Ireland (IRMA)	72
Netherlands (Single Top 100)	82
New Zealand Hot Singles (RMNZ)	32
Norway (VG-lista)	32
Portugal (AFP)	42
Sweden (Sverigetopplistan)	51
Switzerland (Schweizer Hitparade)	25
UK Singles (Official Charts)	62
US Bubbling Under Hot 100 Singles (Billboard)	18
US Hot Rock & Alternative Songs (Billboard)	12
US Rock Airplay (Billboard)	10

=== Year-end charts ===
2022 year-end chart performance for "Toxic"
Chart (2022)	Position
Global 200 (Billboard)	166
US Hot Rock & Alternative Songs (Billboard)	19
US Rock Airplay (Billboard)	25

== Certifications ==
Certifications for "Toxic"
Region	Certification	Certified units/sales
Brazil (Pro-Música Brasil)	Diamond	160,000^{‡}
Canada (Music Canada)	Platinum	80,000^{‡}
France (SNEP)	Gold	100,000^{‡}
Germany (BVMI)	Gold	200,000^{‡}
Italy (FIMI)	Gold	50,000^{‡}
New Zealand (RMNZ)	Platinum	30,000^{‡}
Poland (ZPAV)	Platinum	50,000^{‡}
Portugal (AFP)	Gold	5,000^{‡}
Spain (Promusicae)	Gold	30,000^{‡}
United Kingdom (BPI)	Gold	400,000^{‡}
United States (RIAA)	Platinum	1,000,000^{‡}
^{‡} Sales+streaming figures based on certification alone.
