= Meg Myers =

American musician (born 1986)

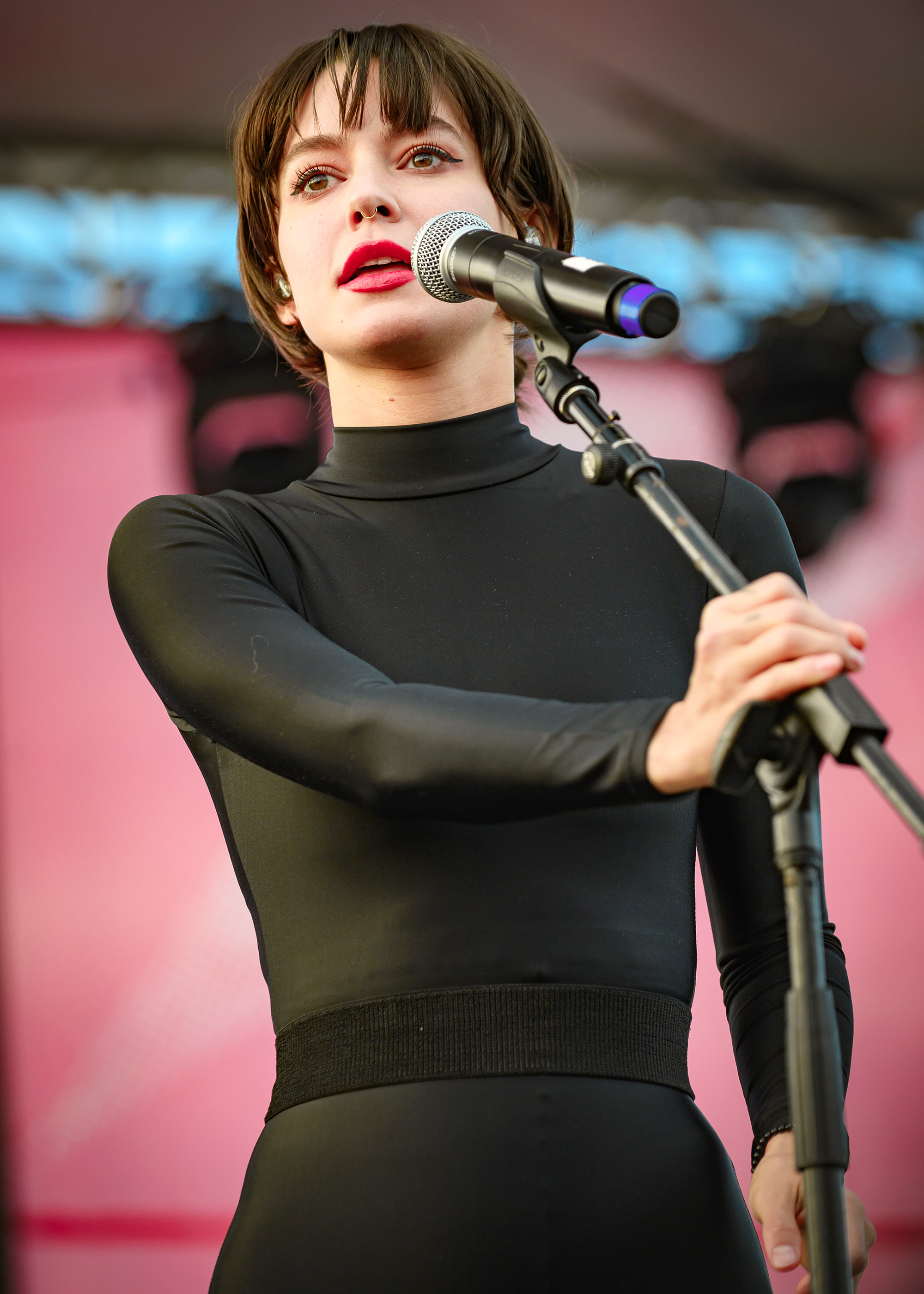
- Myers performing in 2020

Background information
- Born: Janice Sue Meghan Myers; October 6, 1986 (age 40); Nashville, Tennessee, U.S.
- Origin: Los Angeles, California
- Genres: Alternative rock; art pop; pop rock; indie rock; indie pop
- Instruments: Vocals; piano; guitar; bass guitar
- Years active: 2011–present
- Labels: Sumerian; 300; Atlantic; [GOOD]CROOK
- Website: megmyers.com

Janice Sue Meghan Myers (born October 6, 1986), known professionally as Meg Myers, is an American singer-songwriter. Originally from Tennessee, Myers moved to Los Angeles to pursue music and met Doctor Rosen Rosen, who signed her to his production company. In 2012, Myers released her first EP, Daughter in the Choir. Later that year, she signed to Atlantic Records, with which she released the Make a Shadow EP (2014) and her debut album, Sorry (2015). She later departed Atlantic for 300 Entertainment and released Take Me to the Disco, her second album, in 2018. Her third album TZIA was released in 2023 on Sumerian Records.

== Early life ==
Born in Nashville, Myers spent the first five years of her life in Tennessee's Smoky Mountains where she was raised by her father, a truck driver, and her mother, both formerly Jehovah's Witnesses. After her parents divorced, her mother married an artist, who moved the family to Ohio. Her mother and stepfather ran a cleaning business. When she was 12, Myers and her siblings were taken out of school when the family moved, this time to Florida, where they remained throughout her teen years. During this period, Myers began singing, writing songs on keyboard, and teaching herself (and learning from her brother) to play guitar. She played in a band named Feeling Numb that her brother started and named in Coral Springs, Florida.

A few days shy of her 20th birthday, Myers made the decision to move to Los Angeles to pursue a career in music. She lived in a studio apartment with her then-boyfriend, got a job waitressing at a coffee shop in Hollywood, and performed whenever she could secure a gig. After the relationship with her boyfriend ended, Myers met Rosen, who signed her to his production company. The two began writing songs, including all of Daughter in the Choir and Make a Shadow. The full-length album Sorry followed in 2015. According to Myers, her goal for her music is simple, stating that "I want it to make people unafraid to feel."

== Career ==
=== 2012–2014: Daughter in the Choir, signing with Atlantic Records, and Make a Shadow ===
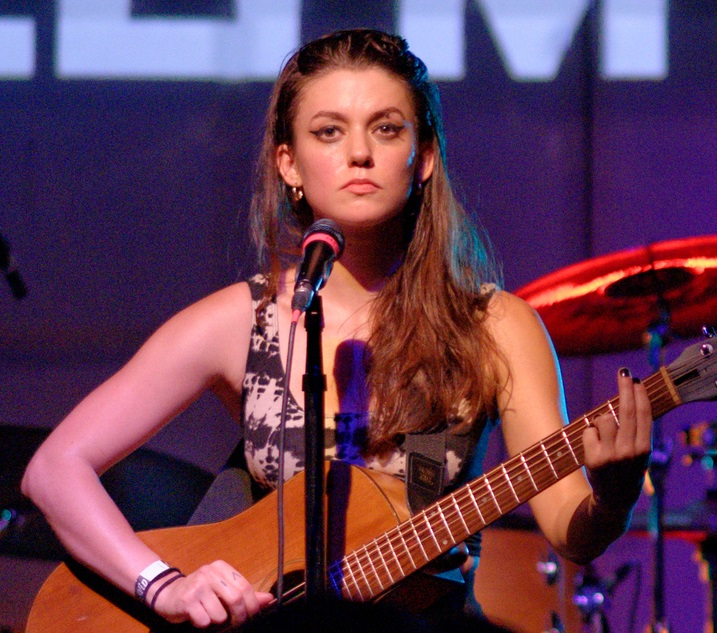
Myers in 2014

Myers released her début Daughter in the Choir EP in March 2012. Prior to release of the EP, she released the single "Monster", which was her first success, thanks to its music video, which was directed by A.P. Fisher and produced by Filippo Nesci, as noted by LA Weekly. Her follow-up single, "Tennessee", was well received. In August 2012, Myers completed a month-long residency at Bootleg Bar in Los Angeles.

In April 2013, Myers released her first single via Atlantic Records, "Heart Heart Head". The music video premièred on Jay Z's Life + Times. In September 2013, Myers opened for The Pixies at three shows in both Los Angeles, CA and Brooklyn, NY and released a new single "Desire", which premiered on Stereogum. Myers kicked off 2014 with the release of the "Desire" music video, premiering it on Vice's Noisey blog. Both "Desire" and "Heart Heart Head" were featured on her second EP, Make a Shadow, which was released on February 7, 2014, and also features "The Morning After", which premièred via SPIN. Myers supported the release of her new EP with a show at LA's Bootleg Bar.

=== 2014–2017: Sorry ===
Following the release of Make a Shadow, Myers began to draw attention at alternative radio, first by Kansas City's KRBZ – 96.5 The Buzz, a station known for breaking acts early on, such as the English indie outfit alt-J. "Desire" became one of the top ten most Shazam'd tracks in the Kansas City metropolitan area. The song was the fourth-most-played (38 times) on KRBZ Kansas City in the week ending June 15, according to Nielsen BDS. It went on to peak at number 17 on the Billboard Alternative Songs chart. Myers performed at the station's annual Afentra's Prom in April, and she joined the New Zealand pop duo Broods on select dates of their Spring North American tour, which included stops in Los Angeles, Chicago, Brooklyn, Washington DC, and Boston. Myers also jumped on the summer festival circuit, having performed at the Governors Ball Music Festival, Bunbury Music Festival, Buzz Beach Ball, and Lollapalooza. The New York Times commented on Myers's Governors Ball performance noting "...early arrivals heard Meg Myers hurling imprecations at the destructive power of love and desire: With seething hard-rock riffs like early P.J. Harvey, and a voice that built from laments to screams, she was cathartic even under noonday sunshine." On February 26, 2015, Myers released on her Instagram a 10-second snippet of her new single "Sorry". A full version was released March 3 on Myers's YouTube channel. A music video for "Sorry" was released on April 7. Myers embarked on her first headlining tour in May 2015.

On July 23, 2015, Myers released a new single entitled "Lemon Eyes". That same day her album was made available for pre-order on iTunes.

On September 15, 2015, Myers released the studio version of her new single "Motel". Three days later, she released her debut album, Sorry, which debuted at number 79 on the Billboard 200.

=== 2018–2020: Take Me to the Disco, Running Up That Hill cover, and EPs with Sumerian Records ===
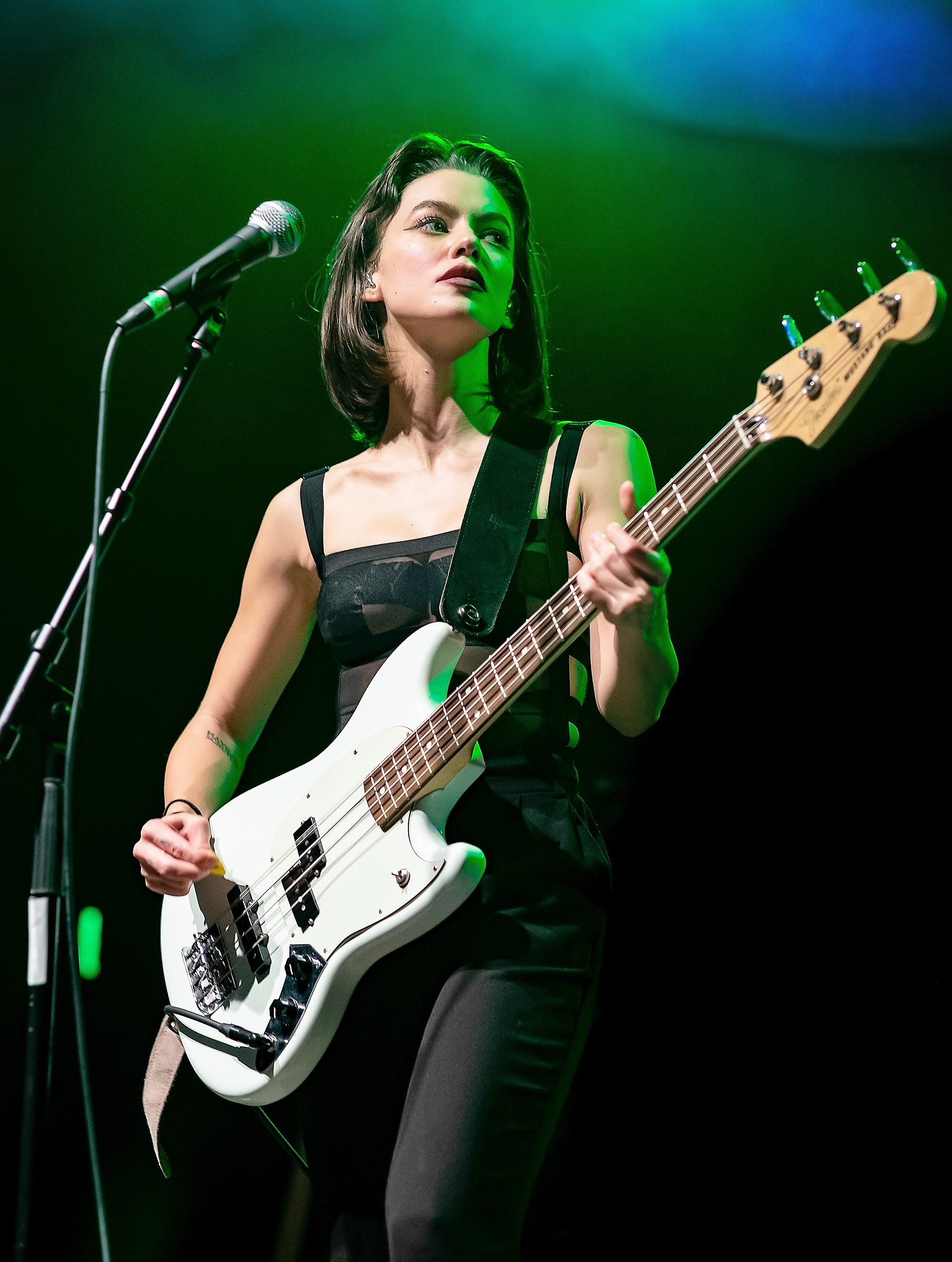
Myers performing in 2018

On April 27, 2018, Myers released the song "Numb" as the lead single from her second album, Take Me to the Disco, which was released on July 20 via 300 Entertainment. "Numb" is about the struggles trying to fit Atlantic Records' expectations for her.

The title track for the album was released on June 1 of that year. The third single from the album, "Jealous Sea", was released on June 28. The fourth single "Tourniquet" was released July 13, a week prior to the album's release.

Myers worked with producer Christian "Leggy" Langdon on the album, recording it mostly at his studio in Topanga. All her previous works were produced by Doctor Rosen Rosen. After completing work on the album, Myers and Atlantic Records mutually parted ways. She brought the completed album to NYC indie label 300 Entertainment.

"I met Andy [Dr. Rosen Rosen] when I was really young and had never worked with anyone one-on-one like that before," Myers told Pass The Aux. "I had never had anyone pull stuff out of me like that so it was a really deep connection musically and as a friendship, like a brother. But change is the only way to grow, really," Myers said of moving on from Rosen.

It was definitely scary and I didn't even know exactly what I wanted to do sonically, but I just had faith. I feel like you just end up meeting the right people, and I met Leggy and it was just such a magical connection. I found another person who would help harness my authenticity.

On March 6, 2019, Myers released a cover of "Running Up That Hill", originally by Kate Bush. With the release, it was also announced that she would be releasing a collection of seven original songs that were recorded as part of the Take Me to the Disco sessions (but were not included on the album) in early summer 2019. However, the EP was not released in 2019 for unknown reasons. Myers then stated during a livestream on her Patreon on April 27, 2020, that the project had evolved into two EPs to be released later in the year. She announced during another Patreon livestream on June 22, 2020, that the two EPs will be titled "Thank U 4 Taking Me 2 The Disco" and "I'd Like 2 Go Home Now". On July 26, 2020, it was announced during a Patreon livestream that her next single would be titled "Any Way You Wanna Love". "Any Way You Wanna Love" was released on September 30, 2020, on Sumerian Records. With the release, it was announced that the EPs would be released on November 13, 2020.

=== 2021–present: TZIA ===
Following the releases of Thank U 4 Taking Me 2 The Disco and I'd Like 2 Go Home Now, she began work on her third full-length album. On March 24, 2022, she released the single "HTIS", which featured Luna Shadows and Carmen Vandenberg. The release of the single "Children of Light II" followed on May 2, 2022. "Sophia <144>" was released as a single on November 3, 2022. On January 31, 2023, Myers released the single "Me". With the release of "Me", Myers announced that her third studio album TZIA would be released on March 24, 2023. The single "My Mirror" was then released on February 28, 2023. She later collaborated with producer GhostMinus for the single "cults", released on January 26, 2024.

== Musical style and influences ==
Myers's musical style is the result of her upbringing and childhood musical influences, as well as collaboration with her co-writer and producer Doctor Rosen Rosen. "I came from this grunge, punk-rock background, but I always wanted to write catchy pop songs," Myers says. "I just didn't have the technical knowledge to make them work. But I grew up listening to well-crafted songs. I loved Sting, Led Zeppelin, Dire Straits, James Taylor and Fleetwood Mac. That's what I was drawn to. I love the simplicity of a great song, I just didn't realize how hard that was to capture in a recording. That's why working with Rosen is so great. It was like, 'Okay, I found this guy I can write songs with and who is really good at turning everything into pop, while still letting me be myself.'"

According to Interview, "the lovelorn facets of Myers' dark, intimate music might evoke Sinéad O'Connor or Fiona Apple, but there are also moments of tumult and menace that trace back to her teenage fascination with grunge bands such as Nirvana and Alice In Chains."

Myers is also a fan of Enya. She confirmed the song "Some People" follows Enya's lead.

== Discography ==
Meg Myers discography
- Studio albums: 3
- Extended plays: 5
- Singles: 18

=== Studio albums ===
List of studio albums, with selected chart positions, sale figures
Title	Album details	Peak chart positions		
Title	Album details	US	US Alt.	US Rock
Sorry	Released: September 18, 2015; Label: Atlantic; Formats: LP, CD, digital download, streaming	79	15	21
Take Me to the Disco	Released: July 20, 2018; Label: 300 Entertainment; Formats: LP, CD, digital download, streaming	182	17	40
TZIA	Released: March 24, 2023; Label: Sumerian; Formats: LP, CD, digital download, streaming	—	—	—

=== Extended plays ===
Title	Album details	Peak chart positions
Title	Album details	US Heat
Daughter in the Choir	Released: April 19, 2013; Label: Atlantic; Formats: CD, Digital download, streaming	—
Make a Shadow	Released: February 7, 2014; Label: Atlantic; Formats: Digital download, streaming	36
Spotify Sessions	Released: December 18, 2015; Label: Atlantic; Formats: streaming	—
Thank U 4 Taking Me 2 the Disco	Released: November 13, 2020; Label: Sumerian; Formats: LP, CD, digital download, streaming	—
I'd Like 2 Go Home Now	Released: November 13, 2020; Label: Sumerian; Formats: LP, CD, digital download, streaming	—

=== Singles ===
Title	Year	Peak chart positions				Album
Title	Year	US AAA	US Alt Airplay	US Rock	CAN Rock	Album
"Monster"	2011	—	—	—	—	Daughter in the Choir
"Curbstomp"	2012	—	—	—	—	Daughter in the Choir
"Tennessee" (featuring Doctor Rosen)	2012	—	—	—	—	Daughter in the Choir
"Heart Heart Head"	2013	—	—	—	—	Make a Shadow
"Desire"	2013	—	17	39	—	Make a Shadow
"Sorry"	2015	—	16	— (Note: "Sorry" did not chart on the Hot Rock & Alternative Songs chart but did peak at number 26 on the Rock Airplay chart.)	—	Sorry
"Lemon Eyes"	2015	—	23	— (Note: "Lemon Eyes" did not chart on the Hot Rock & Alternative Songs chart but did peak at number 42 on the Rock Airplay chart.)	—	Sorry
"Motel"	2016	—	—	—	—	Sorry
"Numb"	2018	—	32	—	—	Take Me to the Disco
"Take Me to the Disco"	2018	—	—	—	—	Take Me to the Disco
"Jealous Sea"	2018	—	—	—	—	Take Me to the Disco
"Running Up That Hill"	2019	23	1	4	32	Non-album single
"Any Way You Wanna Love"	2020	—	30	—	—	Thank U 4 Taking Me 2 the Disco
"I Hope You Cry"	2020	—	—	—	—	Thank U 4 Taking Me 2 the Disco
"The Underground"	2021	—	31	—	29	Thank U 4 Taking Me 2 the Disco
"HTIS" (featuring Luna Shadows and Carmen Vandenberg)	2022	—	—	—	—	TZIA
"Children of Light II"	2022	—	—	—	—	TZIA
"My Mirror"	2023	—	—	—	—	TZIA
"—" denotes a single that did not chart or was not released in that territory.

=== Other appearances ===
Title	Year	Band	Album
"Eye"	2026	The Smashing Pumpkins	Sending Hearts To All My Dearies: A Tribute To The Smashing Pumpkins

== Videography ==
Title	Year	Director
"Monster"	2011	A.P. Fischer
"Tennessee"	2012	Dave Seger
"Curbstomp"	2012	Trish Sie
"Heart Heart Head"	2013	Elliott Sellers
"Cold"	2013	
"Desire"	2013	Jordan Bahat
"Go"	2014	Robert Hales
"Sorry"	2015	Andrew Donoho
"Lemon Eyes"	2015	David Vincent Wolf
"Motel"	2016	Justin Nolan Key
"Numb"	2018	Clara Aranovich
"Jealous Sea"	2018	Clara Aranovich
"Running Up That Hill"	2019	Jo Roy
"Any Way You Wanna Love"	2021	Max Moore
"The Underground"	2021	Mike Anderson
"HTIS" (feat. Luna Shadows & Carmen Vandenberg)	2022	Nas Bogado
"Children of Light II"	2022	Nas Bogado
"Me"	2023	Nas Bogado
"My Mirror"	2023	Alex Bittan
