= Running Up That Hill (Meg Myers recording) =

Single by Meg Myers
- Released: March 6, 2019
- Genre: Alternative
- Length: 4:23
- Label: 300
- Songwriter: Kate Bush
- Producer: Christian Langdon

Meg Myers singles chronology
"Jealous Sea" (2018)	"Running Up That Hill" (2019)	"Any Way You Wanna Love" (2020)

Music video
- "Running Up That Hill" on YouTube

"Running Up That Hill" is a song recorded by the American singer-songwriter Meg Myers. It is a cover of the 1985 single by the English singer-songwriter Kate Bush. Myers, a fan of Bush, had long wanted to cover the song, whose meaning she felt had special significance. The song was released by 300 Entertainment on March 6, 2019. The music video was released on June 27, featuring the artwork of over 2,000 children. The video depicts an animated Myers, created using film of the singer.

Myers's "Running Up That Hill" has been positively assessed by critics and has received comparisons to the original version by Bush. The song was noted by Billboard for the length of time it took to reach the top of its ranking charts, which happened in early 2020. It received a resurgence in popularity in the summer of 2022, coinciding with the release of Stranger Things season 4, which features the original version.

== Background ==
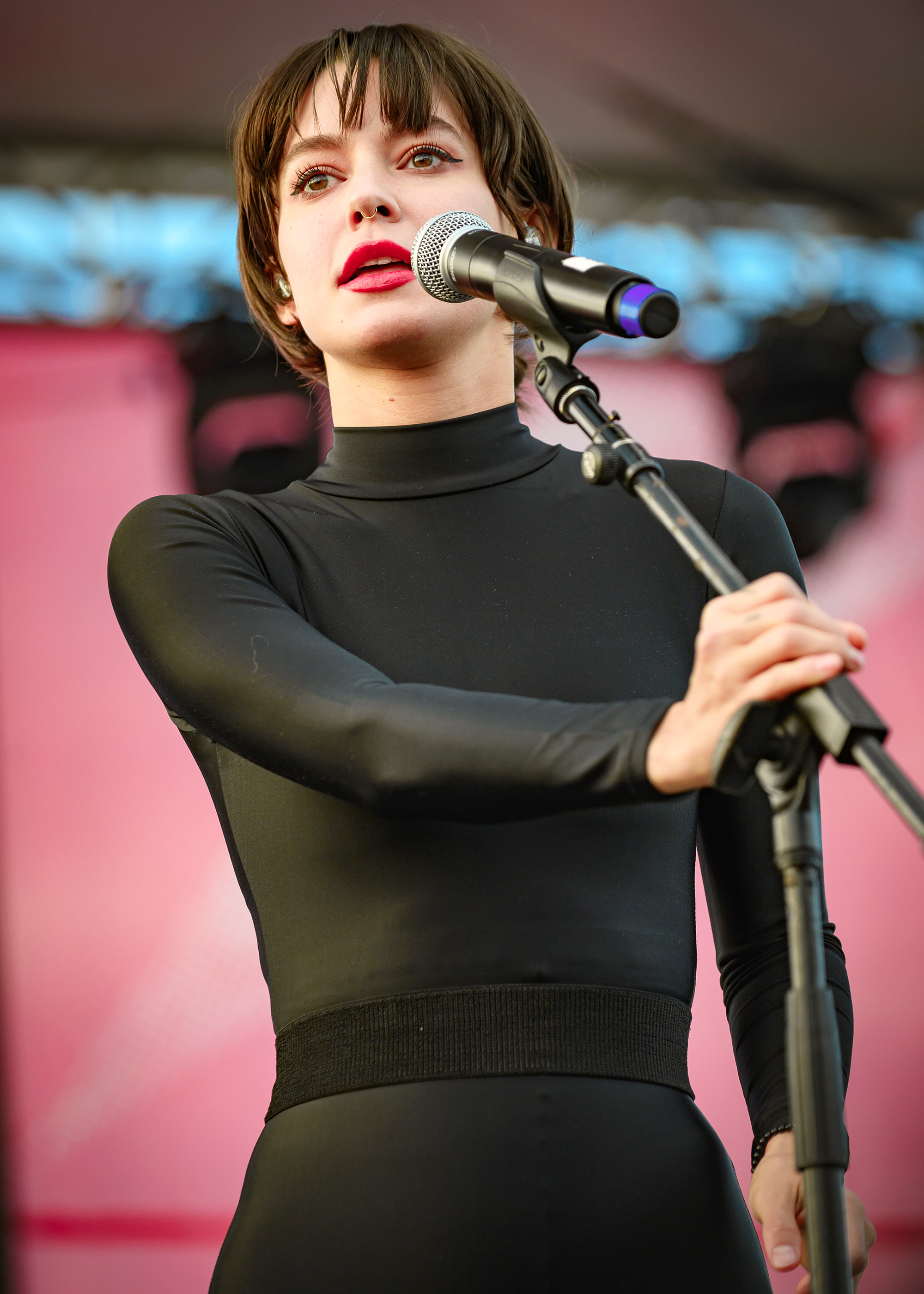
Meg Myers performing in 2020

"Running Up That Hill" was released by the English singer-songwriter Kate Bush on August 5, 1985. It has since been covered by numerous other artists and, as of 2020, was the only Kate Bush song to reach the Top 40 in the United States. Meg Myers is a fan of Kate Bush and is often compared to her, according to National Public Radio (NPR). Myers said her love for the song came from its meaning, which she described as "men and women and the differences between them, and learning to have empathy for each other". She also said that during the recording process, she began to see the song as not specifically about a man and woman's relationship, but as a message for understanding others on a broad scale.

In an interview with Nylon, she said she had felt "guided" to cover the song for a long time. In addition to Myers's vocals, the released version of the song credits Christian "Leggy" Langdon for a variety of roles, including guitar, percussion, piano, programming, synthesizer, and bass guitar. Langdon also served as the song's producer.

== Release ==
Myers first publicly performed "Running Up That Hill" at an NPR Tiny Desk Concert. Both the cover itself and the Tiny Desk Concert where she performed it were released on March 6, 2019. The cover was released by 300 Entertainment. Myers explained that the production of the song had recently finished and that she saw the Tiny Desk Concert as the perfect place to debut it. The song was performed with a string quartet, which Myers acknowledged was different from her usual work, but nonetheless expressed satisfaction with the performance.

== Music video ==
The music video for "Running Up That Hill" was released on June 27, 2019. Each frame of the 12-frame-per-second animation, depicting an illustrated Meg Myers, was colored by a child. The work of a total of 2,130 children is featured, and the video's director, Jo Roy, reported that there was so much interest that many pages did not make it into the final product. Roy grew up in the Edmonton area, where her parents worked as schoolteachers, and she pitched the idea to Myers knowing they could help connect her with local students. Myers said she had wanted children involved from the beginning, as she felt that the song's message could inspire a young audience. The music video credits at least thirteen different schools and organizations for contributing to the coloring. Within a month of its release, the video had reached 400,000 views on YouTube. (Note: In addition to thirteen named schools and organizations, there is an anonymous credit.)

In a press release, Roy described the production process for the music video. She reported that the animation was created using film of Myers, which was then edited and combined with additional stylistic elements. The frames were edited to include lines resembling those of a coloring book, printed, and distributed to their recipient schools and organizations. Roy said that scanning the pages was the most tedious part, as the wax residue was prone to rubbing off.

== Critical reception ==
"Running Up That Hill" has received several positive assessments. Glenn Rowley of Billboard called the cover "fiery" shortly following its release. Following the song's growth in popularity in 2020, Annie Zaleski of Salon.com described Myers's rendition as "pop-leaning" and compared its futuristic sounds to Bush's version. She credited the "booming drums, pulsating keyboards and Myers' gutsy vocal delivery" for helping the song "[surge] forward". A 2022 NPR article discussing Bush's version called Myers's "faithful" cover a "persistent presence in its own right". In 2025, Screen Rant reviewer Zahra Huselid included the song on a list of songs that she regarded as invoking nostalgia for the year 2020, writing that the COVID-19 pandemic gave the song, in her view, a new significance.

== Commercial performance ==
In January 2020, "Running Up That Hill" became Myers's first song to reach number 1 on a Billboard chart (Rock Airplay) and the chart's first new number 1 song of the year. This achievement took place during its 29th tracking week, tying it for the third-longest ascent to number 1 in the ten-year history of Billboard's rankings. It received 8.4 million audience impressions in the tracking week ending on January 19. At that time, it was also number 2 on the Alternative Songs chart and number 27 on Adult Alternative Songs (after previously reaching 26). The former achievement marked the record for the longest ever rise to the top 2 on a Billboard chart. The song set another record when it reached number 1 on the chart on February 1, on its 42nd week. At the end of the year, iHeartRadio ranked it the fourth most played song on alternative radio of 2020.

In late May and early June 2022, the original version of "Running Up That Hill", along with some of its covers, experienced a resurgence in popularity with the release of the fourth season of the series Stranger Things, which features the song. By June 9, Myers's cover had reached number 10 and 15 on separate Billboard charts: Alternative Digital Song Sales and Rock Digital Song Sales, respectively. It experienced an over 400% increase in official US streams in the most recent tracking week as of June 9 and an over 3,000% increase in sales the week of May 20–26.

== Personnel ==
- Carl Stoodt – engineer
- Christian "Leggy" Langdon – engineer, mixer, producer, guitar, percussion, piano, programming, synthesizer, bass guitar
- Meg Myers — vocals
- Stephen Marcussen — masterer
- Kate Bush — writer
