= Astrid Jorgensen =

Australian vocalist, conductor and composer

Astrid Jorgensen OAM
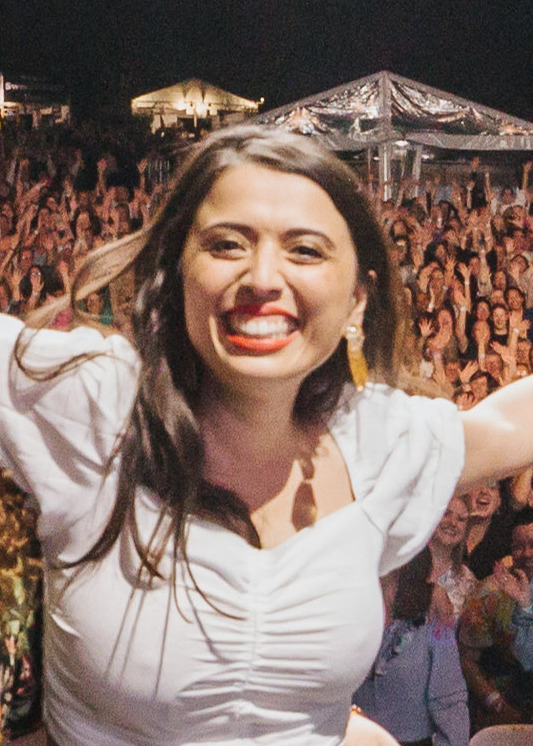

Background information
- Born: 22 April 1990 (age 36); Hamilton, New Zealand
- Origin: Brisbane, Australia
- Occupations: Conductor; composer
- Instrument: Vocals
- Member of: Pub Choir
- Formerly of: Astrid & the Asteroids

Astrid Jorgensen (born 22 April 1990) is an Australian vocalist, conductor, composer and author. She is the founder and director of Pub Choir.

== Early life and education ==
Jorgensen was born on 22 April 1990 in Hamilton, New Zealand, and emigrated to Brisbane, Australia, at seven years of age in 1998. She is the youngest of five children; she has four older brothers.

She attended Lourdes Hill College in Brisbane, graduating in 2006 as college captain. In school she had lessons in piano, violin, and voice.

She earned a Bachelor of Arts (Music) and a Graduate Diploma of Education at the University of Queensland, and a Master of Music Studies (Vocal Performance) at the Queensland Conservatorium of Music. While at the University of Queensland, Jorgensen trained in the Kodály method. She also has a Diploma of Auslan.

== Career ==
=== Early career ===
In 2011 Jorgensen formed the band Astrid & the Asteroids. The group was awarded the Billy Thorpe Scholarship at the 2012 Queensland Music Awards, and later disbanded in 2014.

After graduating from university she worked as a high school music and vocal teacher in Brisbane and Townsville and conducted several community choirs.

=== Pub Choir ===
In 2017 Jorgensen founded Pub Choir in West End, Brisbane. At each Pub Choir event, Jorgensen arranges a popular song and teaches it to a non-trained audience in three-part harmony, concluding with a performance which is filmed and shared on social media. Jorgensen utilises a unique form of musical notation incorporating colour-coded contoured text and comedic visual cues to teach at Pub Choir, so that musical literacy is not required for audience participation. Each show is improvised, with Jorgensen responding to the audience's progress in real-time. Pub Choir gained international attention in November 2017 when their rendition of "Zombie" by The Cranberries went viral online.

=== Couch Choir ===
In March 2020, due to the COVID-19 pandemic and the subsequent cancellation of planned Pub Choir events, Jorgensen launched "Couch Choir". She arranged and uploaded three vocal harmonies of the song (They Long To Be) Close To You by The Carpenters to social media, inviting anybody to learn a part, film themselves singing it, and send it back for inclusion in a final video. There were over 1000 submissions from 18 different countries, and the project was featured on Australian Story. The final video was also shared by Richard Carpenter. Jorgensen continued to host free "Couch Choir" events throughout the pandemic, attracting tens of thousands of participants from over 50 countries.

=== Television ===
In 2021, Jorgensen was a consultant executive producer for the television special Australia's Biggest Singalong!, which was broadcast live on SBS from Sydney Town Hall. The two-hour special was co-created by Pub Choir in collaboration with Artemis Media and SBS and was hosted by Julia Zemiro and Miranda Tapsell. Throughout the interactive special, Jorgensen taught the live audience and home viewers a vocal arrangement of "Throw Your Arms Around Me" by Hunters & Collectors in real-time.

Jorgensen has appeared as a guest on Have You Been Paying Attention?, Spicks and Specks, The Project, and The Cook Up with Adam Liaw. She has also been featured on two episodes of Australian Story.

In 2025, Jorgensen appeared as a contestant on the twentieth season of America's Got Talent, in which she directed the audience in singing "Africa" by Toto for her audition. On August 5, 2025, it was announced that she would be part of the AGT live shows, in which she was scheduled to perform in quarterfinal week 4. However, on 25 August 2025, it was revealed that Jorgensen had dropped out of the competition for unknown reasons; she was replaced by bodybuilder Mike Munz.

=== Memoir ===
In September 2025 Jorgensen's memoir Average At Best was published by Simon & Schuster, described by the publisher as "a powerful, funny, and deeply honest memoir about embracing mediocrity if you want to get anything done". Andrew McMillen, writer for The Australian, praised the memoir, writing "in these pages, [Jorgensen] is revealed as a beautiful writer who blends heart, wit and insight with rare skill". Average At Best was shortlisted for biography book of the year at the 2026 Australian Book Industry Awards.

=== Other ===
In 2018 Jorgensen was the resident choral arranger and conductor for Neil Finn’s Out of Silence show at HOTA on the Gold Coast. She arranged the songs Sisters and Ready or Not on the Spinifex Gum album Sisters with Felix Riebl and Ollie McGill from The Cat Empire. She was a featured guest in Tim Rogers' Liquid Nights in Bohemia Heights shows in 2019.

In 2024 Jorgensen was commissioned to write 20 original vocal compositions for the Queensland Kodály Choir's Legacy Project. The works were published online as free educational resources for choirs and music teachers in perpetuity.

Jorgensen has also worked as a producer for ABC Radio Brisbane, and has performed as a keyboardist in Australian indie rock band The Grates.

== Recognition ==
Jorgensen was awarded the 2019 Queensland Community Foundation Emerging Philanthropist of the Year as a result of her charitable work with Pub Choir.

She was a 2020 Queensland Young Australian of the Year nominee.

In 2021 she was named one of the 40 Under 40 Most Influential Asian-Australians by the Asian-Australian Leadership Summit.

In the King’s Birthday Honours on 12 June 2023, Jorgensen was awarded a Medal of the Order of Australia (OAM).

In 2024 Jorgensen was presented with the Distinguished Young Alumni Award by the University of Queensland.
