= Serotonin Dreams =

Studio album by BoyWithUke
- Released: May 6, 2022
- Length: 30:25
- Label: Republic
- Producer: BoyWithUke

BoyWithUke chronology
Fever Dreams (2021)	Serotonin Dreams (2022)	Lucid Dreams (2023)

Singles from Serotonin Dreams
- 1. "Toxic" Released: October 29, 2021; 2. "Long Drives" Released: January 21, 2022; 3. "IDGAF" Released: March 18, 2022

Serotonin Dreams is the third studio album by American-Korean singer BoyWithUke, and his major label debut. It was released on May 6, 2022, through Republic Records, and primarily written and produced by the singer. The album includes the singles "Toxic", "Long Drives" and "IDGAF" featuring Blackbear, and additionally contains collaborations with Mxmtoon and Powfu. BoyWithUke toured Europe and North America in 2022 in support of the record.

== Critical reception ==
Professional ratings
Review scores
Source	Rating
AllMusic	2.5/5 stars

Marcy Donelson of AllMusic wrote that "BoyWithUke proves his skill with a short-and-sturdy hook, to the point that it often plays like a set of commercial jingles with fat, simple beats" and that "When there are lyrics, they often come in the form of candid crush confessions that aren't too likely to win over their infatuations".

== Track listing ==
All tracks are written and produced by Charley Yang, with additional writers noted. "IDGAF" was additionally produced by Andrew Goldstein.

Serotonin Dreams track listing
No.	Title	Writer(s)	Length
1.	"Far Away"		2:24
2.	"Long Drives"		2:39
3.	"Let Me Down"		3:04
4.	"Prairies" (with Mxmtoon)	Jessie Fink; Maia X.M.T.	3:11
5.	"She Said No"		2:34
6.	"Heart of Ice"		3:09
7.	"IDGAF" (featuring Blackbear)	Matthew Musto	2:20
8.	"Contigo" (with Powfu)	Isaiah Faber	2:31
9.	"Understand"		2:51
10.	"Scared of the Dark"		2:54
11.	"Toxic"		2:48
Total length:			30:25

== Charts ==
Chart performance for Serotonin Dreams
Chart (2022)	Peak position
Australian Albums (ARIA)	64
Austrian Albums (Ö3 Austria)	48
Belgian Albums (Ultratop Flanders)	119
Canadian Albums (Billboard)	33
Dutch Albums (Album Top 100)	72
Finnish Albums (Suomen virallinen lista)	45
Irish Albums (IRMA)	51
New Zealand Albums (RMNZ)	35
Norwegian Albums (VG-lista)	21
Swiss Albums (Schweizer Hitparade)	61
UK Albums (Official Charts)	43
US Billboard 200	72

== Certifications ==
Certifications for Serotonin Dreams
Region	Certification	Certified units/sales
Poland (ZPAV)	Gold	10,000^{‡}
United Kingdom (BPI)	Silver	60,000^{‡}
^{‡} Sales+streaming figures based on certification alone.
