= Live at Hammersmith Odeon (Kate Bush album) =

1994 box set (CD+VHS) live album by Kate Bush

Video by Kate Bush
- Released: 1981
- Recorded: 13 May 1979
- Length: 53 minutes
- Label: EMI on Picture Music International
- Director: Keith "Keef" MacMillan
- Producer: Kate Bush

Kate Bush chronology
Live at Hammersmith Odeon (1981)	The Single File (1983)

Live at Hammersmith Odeon

Live album by Kate Bush
- Released: 8 August 1994
- Recorded: 13 May 1979
- Venue: Hammersmith Odeon (London)
- Genre: Alternative rock, art rock, pop rock
- Length: 53:22
- Label: EMI on Picture Music International
- Producer: Kate Bush

Kate Bush chronology
The Red Shoes (1993)	Live at Hammersmith Odeon (1994)	Aerial (2005)

Live at Hammersmith Odeon is a 1994 live album by the British singer Kate Bush. It is the CD-version of an abridged video recording of the 1979 The Tour of Life, first released on home video in 1981.

The video and CD contain twelve songs recorded live at the Hammersmith Odeon on 13 May 1979, consisting mainly of songs from The Kick Inside and Lionheart with a new song "Violin"; which would subsequently appear on Bush's third studio album Never for Ever in 1980.

In September 1979, Bush released On Stage, an EP of four tracks recorded ostensibly at the same concert. However, the four tracks on this EP are noticeably different from those released in 1994. The EP reached No. 10 in the UK singles chart. and includes a performance of "L'Amour Looks Something Like You" which was not included in the abridged live album.

== Critical reception ==
Professional ratings
Review scores
Source	Rating
AllMovie	4/5 stars
AllMusic	3/5 stars
Music Week	4/5 stars
Q	3/5 stars

Electronics & Music Maker described the release as "a prime example of the integration of music, dance and visual effects".

== Track listing ==
All tracks are written by Kate Bush.

Live at Hammersmith Odeon track listing
No.	Title	Length
1.	"Moving"	3:32
2.	"Them Heavy People"	4:02
3.	"Violin"	3:33
4.	"Strange Phenomena"	3:26
5.	"Hammer Horror"	4:26
6.	"Don't Push Your Foot on the Heartbrake"	4:00
7.	"Wow"	4:00
8.	"Feel It"	3:14
9.	"Kite"	6:12
10.	"James and the Cold Gun"	8:44
11.	"Oh England My Lionheart"	3:23
12.	"Wuthering Heights"	4:50

== Personnel ==
=== Musicians ===
The following list is taken from the tour programme. Additional personnel may be involved.

- Kate Bush – vocals, piano
- Brian Bath – electric guitar, acoustic mandolin, vocal harmonies
- Alan Murphy – electric guitar, whistle
- Paddy Bush – mandolin, vocal harmonies, additional instrumentation
- Ben Barson – synthesizer, acoustic guitar
- Kevin McAlea – piano, keyboards, saxophone, 12 string guitar
- Del Palmer – bass
- Preston Heyman – drums, percussion
- Glenys Groves and Liz Pearson – backing vocals

Production

- Kate Bush – producer
- Gordon Patterson – sound engineer, front of house
- Martin Fisher – stage sound engineer

=== Film crew ===
- Kate Bush – producer, choreography
- Keith McMillan – director
- Richard Dellow, Barrie Dodd, Jim McCutcheon, Mike Morgan, Ron Tufnell – cinematographers
- John Henshall – lighting
- Joe French – unit production manager
- Sarah King – production assistant
- Sandy Field – title design
