= The Tour of Life =

1979 concert tour by Kate Bush

- Tour by Kate Bush
- Cover of the tour programme
- Location: Europe
- Associated album: The Kick Inside; Lionheart
- Start date: 2 April 1979 (warm up concert)
- End date: 13 May 1979
- Legs: 1
- No. of shows: 28

Kate Bush concert chronology
- The Tour of Life (1979); Before the Dawn (2014)

The Tour of Life (originally known as the "Lionheart Tour", and also officially referred to as the Kate Bush Tour) (Note: Unofficial outside sources have also referred to this as the "Kate Bush Show" and "Kate Bush: On Tour".) was a first concert tour by English singer-songwriter and musician Kate Bush. Starting in April 1979, the tour lasted just over six weeks and was acclaimed for its incorporation of mime, magic, and readings during costume changes. The show contained 24 performances from Bush's first two albums The Kick Inside and Lionheart (both 1978), and new songs "Violin" and "Egypt" which would subsequently appear on Bush's third album Never for Ever (1980).

The tour is renowned for its use of new technology; due to Bush's determination to dance as she sang, her stage sound engineer Martin Fisher developed a wireless headset microphone, using a wire clothes hanger (for the prototype), during rehearsals at Shepperton Studios, making her the first singer to use such a device on stage. The staging also involved rear-screen projection and the accompaniment of two male dancers.

The tour was a critical and commercial success, with most dates selling out and additional shows being added due to high demand. Members of the Kate Bush Club were provided with a guaranteed ticket. The BBC filmed a special of the show entitled Kate Bush: On Tour. The documentary featured the production and staging of the set, and revealed the extent to which Bush was involved. Broadcast in 1979, it did not show any of the full performances. The concert spawned two physical releases, the EP On Stage (1979) as well as the home video Live at Hammersmith Odeon (1981). Live at the Hammersmith Odeon was later re-issued in 1994 as a boxed set including an audio CD of the broadcast as well as the video.

The name "Tour of Life" was not coined until after its completion, with all promotional material referring to it simply as the Kate Bush Tour. Neither the EP nor the home video makes reference to the name.

The tour was also notable for the death of Bush's lighting engineer, Bill Duffield, to whom one of the London shows and later the song Blown Away was dedicated.

== Background and production ==
After Bush turned down an opportunity to perform as a supporting act for Fleetwood Mac, production for the tour began in December 1978. Bush was said to be involved in almost every aspect of the show's design, rehearsals, and performances. The show was choreographed by Bush and Anthony Van Laast, in collaboration with dancers Stewart Avon Arnold and Gary Hurst. Dance rehearsals took place at The Place during mornings leading up to the tour, before afternoon vocal and band rehearsals in Greenwich. Production rehearsals featuring all personnel and audiovisual technology took place at Rainbow Theatre in London, beginning on 26 March and finishing on 29 March 1978.

The tour was known for its innovative use of visual projections, audio and microphone technology, and narrative storyline. Bush aimed for the tour to offer a theatrical experience to contrast the performances of other contemporary rock musicians, and sought to combine "music, dance, poetry, mime, burlesque, magic and theatre." The performance was divided into four sections, concluding with two encores, and incorporated seventeen costume changes and involved thirteen on-stage personnel. Magician Simon Drake performed throughout the show. The stage itself was constructed with a retractable ramp at its centre, with a "large ribbed screen – intended to represent an egg – on to which slides and film footage could be projected". Eight "follow spot" moving lights tracked the musicians and performers on stage. Since the tour, Bush has become known as the first artist to use a cordless microphone headset, which allowed her to move and dance freely while singing live. The headset prototype was created, constructed and developed by the tour stage engineer Martin Fisher, using a coathanger and radio microphone.

The tour opened on 3 April 1979 in Liverpool at the Liverpool Empire, following a warm-up gig in Poole on 2 April 1979. Ultimately, each night of the tour sold out. Following the Poole show, the tour's lighting engineer Bill Duffield was killed after falling from a stage and seating structure at the concert venue. The first of the final three London dates on 12 May 1979 was performed as a benefit concert for the family of Duffield, and featured an altered setlist and performances by Peter Gabriel and Steve Harley. Bush released the song "Blow Away (For Bill)", dedicated to Duffield, on her third studio album Never for Ever (1980).

In 1994, Bush described the physical exhaustion she experienced as a result of touring, a comment which she echoed in 2011. Bush did not tour again until 2014's Before the Dawn, a concert residency at London's Hammersmith Apollo.

== Concert synopsis ==
The show opened with playback of whale song, with Bush's shadow projected as she began to dance while the curtain parted to reveal the stage. Bush, wearing a blue leotard, sang the first song "Moving." A shadow projection of the band's saxophone player was used next, during "The Saxophone Song". The theatre was then filled with the sound of a heartbeat as red lights flickered while the onstage piano was removed. A large oval upholstered with red satin, designed to look like an egg or womb, was rolled onto the stage, from within which Bush sang "Room for the Life" as it was rolled around the stage. Dressed in a long coat and trilby hat, Bush was joined by two male dancers to perform "Them Heavy People". She then moved to the piano to play "The Man with the Child in His Eyes". The band then played the as yet unreleased "Egypt", while Bush emerged from the back of the stage wearing an Egyptian costume. An extended introduction to "L'Amour Looks Something Like You" was then played in darkness, while Bush changed into a black leotard and red skirt. While at centre-stage by a tall mirror, a magician emerged to perform with a flying cane. Bush performed "Violin", wearing bat wings and taunted by her two dancers dressed as giant violins. As the stage darkened, Bush's brother, John Carder Bush, recited a poem, which culminated in a spoken duet with Bush herself. She was then illuminated by a spotlight for the performance "The Kick Inside" at the piano. A black veil was placed over her and the curtains closed.

The second section began with the curtains parting to reveal Bush wearing a long black dress, sitting on top of a piano to perform "In the Warm Room". She then played the piano while singing "Fullhouse", after which the band played an extended introduction to "Strange Phenomena" as Bush changed into a magician's top hat and tails, while her dancers, now dressed as space men, performed with her. The magician then reappeared with his cane; he walked to the back of the stage holding a black cloth, which then dropped to reveal Bush, now wearing a veil, behind it. She danced with a male dancer to a live rehearsal playback recording of "Hammer Horror", recreating the routine from its music video, after which a chant commenced, leading into "Kashka from Baghdad", performed at the piano. Traffic noise was played to the audience while the stage was fitted with a street theme, including fences which the dancers illuminated with torches. A spotlight was switched on and Bush sang and danced to "Don't Push Your Foot on the Heartbrake", bringing the second section to a close.

The third section began with the curtain opening on Bush, now wearing a purple dress, at the edge of the ramp which had been lifted to replicate a pier, to perform "Wow." "Coffee Homeground" began as a prisoner cell set was assembled; Bush sang on a centre-stage chair, as corpse props fell out of the walls. Another spoken word poem was recited by Bush's brother as "Symphony in Blue" (incorporating elements of "Gymnopédie 1" by Erik Satie) began to be played. Bush, now dressed in a blue leotard covered by a leather jacket, performed while waving to the audience as images of a cloudy sky were projected. Bush, now covered in party streamers refused a floating glass of champagne from the magician and performed "Feel It" at the piano. As the song came to an end, thunder was heard while Bush changed; she emerged with her leotard now fitted with wings, to perform "Kite", being lifted off the stage at the end of the song. Bush then appeared in Wild West attire whilst brandishing a shotgun, dancing and singing to "James and the Cold Gun". Her dancers, emerging from the wings, were shot by Bush using red ribbons acting as gunfire as the song ended and the curtain closed.

For the show's first encore, Bush and her dancers emerged wearing World War II bomber attire as a parachute was spread across the stage. She sat to sing "Oh England My Lionheart", and the curtain closed again. There was a short interval before the curtains re-opened upon the stage covered in dry ice fog and illuminated in red with a forest backdrop. As the music to "Wuthering Heights" began, Bush sprang up through the fog, costumed as the ghost of Catherine Earnshaw from Emily Brontë's novel of the same name. She performed the dance routine from the song's music video, before retreating to the top of the ramp, waving to the audience, and exiting the stage as the curtain closed.

== Critical reception ==
Reaction to the tour performances was overwhelmingly positive. In 2010, The Guardian noted that British reviews of the tour were almost universally "euphoric".

Describing the show as "exceptional", Robin Denselow of The Guardian praised the show's "innovation in rock choreography and microphone design". However, Denselow was critical of Bush's vocals, describing Bush as possessing a "shrill acrobatic voice". A review in Melody Maker disagreed, praising both Bush's lower and higher-pitched vocal registers, whilst noting that Bush had created "a series of tableaux vivants of peerless visual and aural dazzle that added immeasurably to the complexity and variable excellence of her songs." Another reviewer for Melody Maker described the tour's performance in Birmingham as "the most magnificent spectacle ever encountered in the world of rock". The Telegraph described Bush as a "stunningly original stage performer", praising the setlist of the show as "dazzling testimony to a remarkable talent, evidently intense rehearsal and technological know-how".

== Broadcasts and recordings ==
The BBC filmed a documentary following the tour as part of the news and current affairs television programme Nationwide, titled Kate Bush: On Tour. The special was screened on BBC1 on 31 August 1979. Although it did not show any of the full performances, it featured Bush discussing her involvement in the tour, and incorporated footage of dance and band rehearsals, before showing footage of the final rehearsals at the Rainbow Theatre and the official opening night in Liverpool. It also included a screening of the music video for the single "Hammer Horror". A documentary following two performances of the tour for German audiences entitled Kate Bush in Concert was also aired in Germany in May 1980.

Two physical releases were spawned by the tour. EMI Records released the extended play (EP) On Stage on 31 August 1979, featuring live performances of the songs "Them Heavy People", "Don't Push Your Foot on the Heartbrake", "James and the Cold Gun" and "L'Amour Looks Something Like You". The EP peaked at number 10 and spent nine weeks on the UK Singles Chart. The tracks were ostensibly recorded at the Hammersmith Odeon on 13 May 1979, however they are markedly different to those later published on the home video of that concert.

An hour length video of aspects of the concert was released as a home video directed by Keith McMillan titled Live at Hammersmith Odeon in 1981. Also recorded on 13 May 1979, the video featured only twelve performances as others were marred by technical difficulties. In 1994, the video was re-issued as a box set including an audio CD of the broadcast as well as the video. Neither the EP nor the home video make reference to the name "Tour of Life", which was not coined until after the tour's completion.

== Set list ==
1. "Moving"
2. "The Saxophone Song"
3. "Room for the Life"
4. "Them Heavy People"
5. "The Man with the Child in His Eyes"
6. "Egypt"
7. "L'Amour Looks Something Like You"
8. "Violin"
9. "The Kick Inside"*
10. "In the Warm Room"
11. "Fullhouse" (not performed at the Hammersmith Odeon dates in London)
12. "Strange Phenomena"
13. "Hammer Horror" (not performed live)
14. "Kashka From Baghdad" then chanting
15. "Don't Push Your Foot on the Heartbrake"
16. "Wow"
17. "Coffee Homeground" (with extended instrumental introduction)
18. "In Search of Peter Pan"*
19. "Symphony in Blue" (contains elements of "Gymnopédie 1" by Erik Satie)
20. "Feel It" (with instrumental introduction)
21. "Kite"
22. "James and the Cold Gun"
23. "Oh England My Lionheart" **
24. "Wuthering Heights"**

* followed by John Carder Bush poetry reading. ** Encores.

== Personnel ==
Credits and personnel adapted from the Kate Bush Tour programme available at the concerts.

Performers

- Ben Barson – synthesizer, acoustic guitar
- Brian Bath – electric guitar, acoustic mandolin, background vocals
- Kate Bush – vocals, piano, keyboards
- Paddy Bush – mandolin, background vocals, various instruments
- Simon Drake – magician
- Glenys Groves – background vocals
- Preston Heyman – Drums/Percussion
- Kevin McAlea – piano, keyboards, saxophone, 12-string guitar
- Alan Murphy – electric guitar, whistles
- Del Palmer – bass guitar
- Liz Pearson – background vocals

Production

- Conception, producer, director – Kate Bush
- Production design, stage direction – Dave Jackson
- Stage management – Nick Levitt
- Stage crew – Cliff Carter, Martin Prior, Gerry Raymond Barker, Andrew Bryant
- Costuming – Lisa Hayes
- Costuming assistance – Hermione Brakspear
- Choreography – Anthony Van Laast

Audiovisuals

- Sound engineering – Gordon Patterson
- Stage sound engineer Martin Fisher
- Projections – Ken Sutherland
- Lighting consulting – James Dann
- Spoken word and poetry – John Carder Bush
- Photography – Gered Mankowitz, Terry Walker, Hirchono

Tour management

- Promotion – Lindsay Brown
- Tour management – Richard Ames
- Programmes – Kate Bush, Nicholas Wade, Nick Price
- Tour graphics and merchandise – Paul Maxwell Ltd.
- Tour co-ordination – Hilary Walker, John Carder Bush

== Tour dates ==
Date (1979)	City	Country	Venue
2 April (Note: The show on 2 April was billed as a "warm-up" concert.)	Poole	England	Poole Arts Centre
3 April	Liverpool	England	Liverpool Empire Theatre
4 April	Birmingham	England	Birmingham Hippodrome
5 April	Birmingham	England	Birmingham Hippodrome
6 April	Oxford	England	New Theatre Oxford
7 April	Southampton	England	Gaumont Theatre
9 April	Bristol	England	Bristol Hippodrome
10 April	Manchester	England	Manchester Apollo
11 April	Manchester	England	Manchester Apollo
12 April	Sunderland	England	Sunderland Empire Theatre
13 April	Edinburgh	Scotland	Usher Hall
16 April	London	England	Palladium
17 April	London	England	Palladium
18 April	London	England	Palladium
19 April	London	England	Palladium
20 April	London	England	Palladium
24 April	Stockholm	Sweden	Stockholm Konserthuset
26 April	Copenhagen	Denmark	Falkoner Theatre
28 April	Hamburg	West Germany	Congress Center Hamburg
29 April	Amsterdam	Netherlands	Carré Theatre
2 May	Stuttgart	West Germany	Kongresszentrum Liederhalle
3 May	Munich	West Germany	Circus Krone
4 May	Cologne	West Germany	Köln Gürzenich
6 May	Paris	France	Théâtre des Champs-Élysées
8 May	Mannheim	West Germany	Mannheimer Rosengarten
10 May	Frankfurt	West Germany	Jahrhunderthalle
12 May (Note: The show on 12 May was a benefit concert for Bill Duffield with an altered setlist, billed as Kate Bush In Aid of Bill Duffield. Peter Gabriel and Steve Harley appeared as guest performers.)	London	England	Hammersmith Odeon
13 May	London	England	Hammersmith Odeon
14 May	London	England	Hammersmith Odeon
