= Before the Dawn (Kate Bush album) =

Live album by Kate Bush
- Released: 25 November 2016
- Recorded: August–October 2014
- Venue: Hammersmith Apollo (London)
- Genre: Progressive rock; progressive pop; art pop; art rock
- Length: 155:07
- Label: Fish People; Concord (North America)
- Producer: Kate Bush

Kate Bush chronology
50 Words for Snow (2011)	Before the Dawn (2016)	The Other Sides (2019)

Singles from Before the Dawn
- 1. "King of the Mountain (Live)" Released: 21 October 2016; 2. "And Dream of Sheep (Live)" Released: 18 November 2016

Professional ratings
Aggregate scores
Source	Rating
Metacritic	84/100
Review scores
Source	Rating
Allmusic	4/5 stars
The A.V. Club	A−
The Guardian	4/5 stars
The Independent	4/5 stars
Mojo	4/5 stars
The Observer	4/5 stars
Pitchfork	8.5/10
Q	4/5 stars
The Times	4/5 stars
Uncut	4/5 stars

Before the Dawn is the second live album by the English singer-songwriter Kate Bush. It was released on 25 November 2016 by Bush's label Fish People, and is distributed in the United States by Concord Records. It was recorded in 2014 during Bush's sell-out 22-date residency, Before the Dawn, at the Hammersmith Apollo in London, which saw her return to the stage following a 35-year absence. The album is certified gold in the UK.

== Overview ==
As with the residency, the album is split into three parts, comprising seven miscellaneous songs, the complete Ninth Wave suite from Hounds of Love, and A Sky of Honey from Bush's 2005 release Aerial. Presented in the same order as the original show, the album's performances are culled from various shows throughout the residency.

Before the Dawn contains the song "Tawny Moon" performed by Bush's son, Albert McIntosh. "Never Be Mine" did not feature on the Before the Dawn residency; however, it was recorded when the show was performed without an audience for the purposes of filming the production.

Following two years of speculation, the album, released as three-CD and four-record pressings, was officially announced on 29 September 2016; the track "Prologue" was also shared. Bush commented:

It was an extraordinary experience putting the show together. It was a huge amount of work, a lot of fun and an enormous privilege to work with such an incredibly talented team. This is the audio document. I hope that this can stand alone as a piece of music in its own right and that it can be enjoyed by people who knew nothing about the shows as well as those who were there. I never expected the overwhelming response of the audiences, every night filling the show with life and excitement. They are there in every beat of the recorded music. Even when you can't hear them, you can feel them.

The track "Prologue (Live)" was made available for streaming on 28 September, before "King of the Mountain (Live)" was released as a promotional single on 21 October, and "And Dream of Sheep (Live)", along with an accompanying piece of film used during the concerts, was made available as the album's official single on 18 November 2016.

In November 2018, Bush released box sets of remasters of her studio albums. Before the Dawn was included in the second box set, but was not remastered.

== Track listing ==
All songs written by Kate Bush, except "Astronomer's Call", "Waking the Witch", and "Watching Them Without Her", written with David Mitchell, and "Jig of Life" written with Bill Whelan and John Carder Bush.

Disc one: Act I

1. "Lily" – 4:50
2. "Hounds of Love" – 3:29
3. "Joanni" – 6:09
4. "Top of the City" – 5:13
5. "Never Be Mine" – 5:57
6. "Running Up That Hill (A Deal with God)" – 5:39
7. "King of the Mountain" – 8:08

Disc two: Act II – The Ninth Wave

1. "Astronomer's Call" – 2:38
2. "And Dream of Sheep" – 3:35
3. "Under Ice" – 2:59
4. "Waking the Witch" – 6:35
5. "Watching Them Without Her" – 2:01
6. "Watching You Without Me" – 4:25
7. "Little Light" – 2:04
8. "Jig of Life" – 4:09
9. "Hello Earth" – 8:00
10. "The Morning Fog" – 5:19

Disc three: Act III – A Sky of Honey

1. "Prelude" – 1:53
2. "Prologue" – 10:12
3. "An Architect's Dream" – 5:19
4. "The Painter's Link" – 1:33
5. "Sunset" – 7:59
6. "Aerial Tal" – 1:29
7. "Somewhere in Between" – 7:01
8. "Tawny Moon" – 6:10
9. "Nocturn" – 8:48
10. "Aerial" – 9:45
11. "Among Angels" – 5:50
12. "Cloudbusting" – 7:16

== Personnel ==
- Kate Bush – vocals, piano ("The Ninth Wave", pre-recorded. Live performance on "Prologue", "Among Angels"), pre-recorded synths
- Kevin McAlea – keyboards, Uilleann pipes, accordion
- Jon Carin – keyboards, guitars, programming, vocals
- David Rhodes – guitars
- Friðrik Karlsson – guitars, bouzouki, charango
- John Giblin – bass
- Mino Cinelu – percussion
- Omar Hakim – drums

Speaking parts and chorus

- John Carder Bush – writer and narrator ("Jig of Life")
- Paddy Bush – helicopter pilot ("Waking the Witch"), harmonic vocals, fujare
- Kevin Doyle – astronomer ("Astronomer's Call")
- Jo Servi – witchfinder ("Waking the Witch"), chorus
- Albert McIntosh – Ben ("Watching Them Without Her"), Boy ("Prelude", "The Painter's Link", "Tawny Moon"), chorus
- Bob Harms – dad ("Watching Them Without Her"), chorus
- Jacqui DuBois, Sandra Marvin – chorus

Production

- Kate Bush – writer, producer, mixing
- David Mitchell – co-writer ("Astronomer's Call", "Watching Them Without Her", and the helicopter pilot)
- Nick Skilbeck – chorus MD
- Ben Thompson – puppeteer
- Robert Allsopp – puppet creation
- Chris Lawson – guitar and bass technician
- Morten 'Turbo' Thobro – keyboard (and guitar) technician
- Steve Grey – drums and percussion technician
- Ian Newton – monitor engineer, 'water tank' vocals research and recording
- Baz Tymms – backline technician
- Greg Walsh – FOH engineer, surround systems supervision, 'water tank' vocals research and recording
- Davide Lombardi – FOH engineer
- Davey Williamson – surround systems engineer
- James Drew – soundscape
- Jim Jones and Ian Silvester – studio technician, live show recording
- Stephen W Tayler – live lead vocal engineer, audio post-production sunshine, mixing
- James Guthrie – sound consultant, mastering
- Joel Plante – mastering
- Stuart Crouch Creative - album artwork design
- Timorous Beasties – Two Worlds illustration
- Ruth Rowland – hand lettering
- Tim Walker, Trevor Leighton, Ken McKay, Gavin Bush – photography
- Tim Walker – cover photography
- Paul Munro – 'water tank' Vocals Production Sound MIxer

== Charts ==
=== Weekly charts ===
Weekly chart performance for Before the Dawn
Chart (2016–2017)	Peak position
Australian Albums (ARIA)	35
Austrian Albums (Ö3 Austria)	45
Belgian Albums (Ultratop Flanders)	22
Belgian Albums (Ultratop Wallonia)	39
Canadian Albums (Billboard)	89
Czech Albums (ČNS IFPI)	71
Dutch Albums (Album Top 100)	11
Finnish Albums (Suomen virallinen lista)	26
French Albums (SNEP)	52
German Albums (Offizielle Top 100)	14
Irish Albums (IRMA)	6
Italian Albums (FIMI)	34
New Zealand Heatseekers Albums (RMNZ)	2
Polish Albums (ZPAV)	38
Scottish Albums (Official Charts)	5
Swedish Albums (Sverigetopplistan)	45
Swiss Albums (Schweizer Hitparade)	37
UK Albums (Official Charts)	4
US Billboard 200	121
US Top Alternative Albums (Billboard)	5
US Top Rock Albums (Billboard)	11
US Indie Store Album Sales (Billboard)	8

=== Year-end charts ===
Year-end chart performance for Before the Dawn
Chart (2016)	Position
UK Albums (OCC)	77

== Certifications ==
Certifications for Before the Dawn
Region	Certification	Certified units/sales
United Kingdom (BPI)	Gold	100,000^{‡}
^{‡} Sales+streaming figures based on certification alone.
