= King of the Mountain (Kate Bush song) =

2005 single by Kate Bush

Single by Kate Bush

from the album Aerial
- B-side: "Sexual Healing"
- Released: 24 October 2005
- Recorded: 1994–2005
- Length: 4:26
- Label: EMI
- Songwriter: Kate Bush
- Producer: Kate Bush

Kate Bush singles chronology
"And So Is Love" (1994)	"King of the Mountain" (2005)	"Deeper Understanding (Director's Cut)" (2011)

Music video
- "King of the Mountain" on YouTube

"King of the Mountain" is a song by British singer-songwriter Kate Bush. Taken from her eighth album, Aerial (2005), it was released on 24 October 2005 as the album's only single. The single peaked at No. 4 in the UK Singles Chart.

== Overview ==
"King of the Mountain" was released as a single by EMI Records on 24 October 2005, Bush's first single since "And So Is Love", which had been released 11 years before. It was first played on BBC Radio 2 on 21 September 2005.

Written about ten years before most of the songs on Aerial, the lyrics enquire whether Elvis Presley might still be alive someplace, "...looking like a happy man..." and playing with "Rosebud", Kane's childhood's sled, and comment on the pressures of extreme fame and wealth. In a November 2005 interview with BBC Four's Front Row Bush said, "I don't think human beings are really built to withstand that kind of fame."

Sung in a slightly slurred Elvis-type manner, the track was produced by Bush; the recording was engineered by Del Palmer and mastered by James Guthrie. The cover art is a drawing by her son Bertie.

The B-side of the UK single is a cover version of Marvin Gaye's "Sexual Healing", which features Irish musician Davy Spillane on uilleann pipes, originally recorded for his 1994 A Place Among the Stones album. The track was left off the Spillane album as it didn't fit with the sound of the rest of the record and before the 2005 release, Bush's version of "Sexual Healing" had only been heard publicly once, at the 1994 Kate Bush fan club convention in the Hippodrome, London.

== Chart performance ==
Upon its release, the single entered the UK Singles Chart at number four, becoming Bush's first top-10 single in nearly 20 years (since "Don't Give Up", her duet with Peter Gabriel, reached number nine in 1986). The single also reached the top five in Canada and charted in several other countries. It is the only single from the album Aerial.

== Music video ==
The music video received its first airing on the UK's Channel 4 on 15 October 2005. It was directed by Jimmy Murakami, produced by Michael Algar, edited at The Farm (Dublin) by Hugh Chaloner with flame and 3D effects by Niall O hOisin, Arron Inglis, Brian O'Durnin and Mark from Australia.

== Live performances ==
The track was performed live at the Before the Dawn residency in 2014, and a live version released on the Before the Dawn album in 2016.

== Track listing ==
Standard
No.	Title	Length
1.	"King of the Mountain"	4:53
2.	"Sexual Healing"	5:58

== Charts ==
Chart performance for "King of the Mountain"
Chart (2005)	Peak position
Austria (Ö3 Austria Top 40)	71
Canada (Nielsen SoundScan)	5
Europe (Eurochart Hot 100)	12
Finland (Suomen virallinen lista)	3
Germany (GfK)	42
Greece (IFPI Greece)	31
Ireland (IRMA)	13
Italy (FIMI)	24
Netherlands (Single Top 100)	13
Scottish Singles Sales (Official Charts)	4
Switzerland (Schweizer Hitparade)	47
UK Singles (Official Charts)	4
