= Symphony in Blue =

- Japanese single cover

Single by Kate Bush

from the album Lionheart
- B-side: "Fullhouse" (Japan); "Hammer Horror" (Canada)
- Released: 5 May 1979 (Japan); 1 June 1979 (Canada)
- Recorded: July–September 1978
- Studio: Super Bear Studios (Berre-les-Alpes, France)
- Genre: Art rock
- Length: 3:36
- Label: EMI, Harvest
- Songwriter: Kate Bush
- Producer: Andrew Powell

Kate Bush singles chronology
"Wow" (1978)	"Symphony in Blue" (1979)	"Strange Phenomena" (1979)

Audio
- "Symphony in Blue" by Kate Bush on YouTube

"Symphony in Blue" is a song written and recorded by Kate Bush and is the opening track to her second album, Lionheart (1978). It was released as a single in Japan and Canada, and was the final single taken from Lionheart.

As with the "Wow" single elsewhere, the Lionheart track "Fullhouse" was used as the B-side for the Japanese single. Its picture sleeve was exclusive to this release. The Canadian release was pressed on blue vinyl.

== Track listing ==
All tracks written and composed by Kate Bush.

7" vinyl – EMI (Japan)

1. "Symphony in Blue" – 3:36
2. "Fullhouse" – 3:14

7" vinyl - Harvest (Canada)

1. "Symphony in Blue" – 3:36
2. "Hammer Horror – 4:37

== Personnel ==
Musicians

- Stuart Elliot – drums, percussion
- David Paton – bass
- Ian Bairnson – electric guitar
- Kate Bush – vocals, harmony vocals, piano
- Duncan Mackay – Fender Rhodes (Piano)

Production

- Andrew Powell – producer
- Kate Bush – assistant producer
- Patrick Jauneaud – assistant engineer
- David Katz – orchestra contractor
- Jon Kelly – recording engineer
- Nigel Walker – assistant engineer, mixing, mixing assistant
