= Before the Dawn (residency) =

Concerts in London, 2014

- Residency by Kate Bush
- Promotional image with text of the show announcement
- Location: London, England
- Venue: Apollo Hammersmith
- Start date: 26 August 2014
- End date: 1 October 2014
- Legs: 1
- No. of shows: 22

Kate Bush concert chronology
- The Tour of Life (1979); Before the Dawn (2014)

Before the Dawn was a concert residency by the English singer-songwriter Kate Bush in 2014 at the Hammersmith Apollo in London. The residency consisted of 22 dates, attended by almost 80,000 people. It was Bush's first series of live shows since The Tour of Life in 1979, which finished with three performances at the same venue. The live recording album Before the Dawn was released in physical and digital formats in November 2016.

On 21 March 2014, Bush announced via her website her plans to perform live. Pre-sale tickets were on sale for fans who had signed up to her website and an additional seven dates were added to the original 15, due to the high demand. Tickets went on sale to the general public on 28 March and sold out within 15 minutes.

Bush won the Editor's Award at the Evening Standard Theatre Awards; and was subsequently nominated for two Q Awards in 2014: Best Act in the World Today and Best Live Act.

== Overview ==
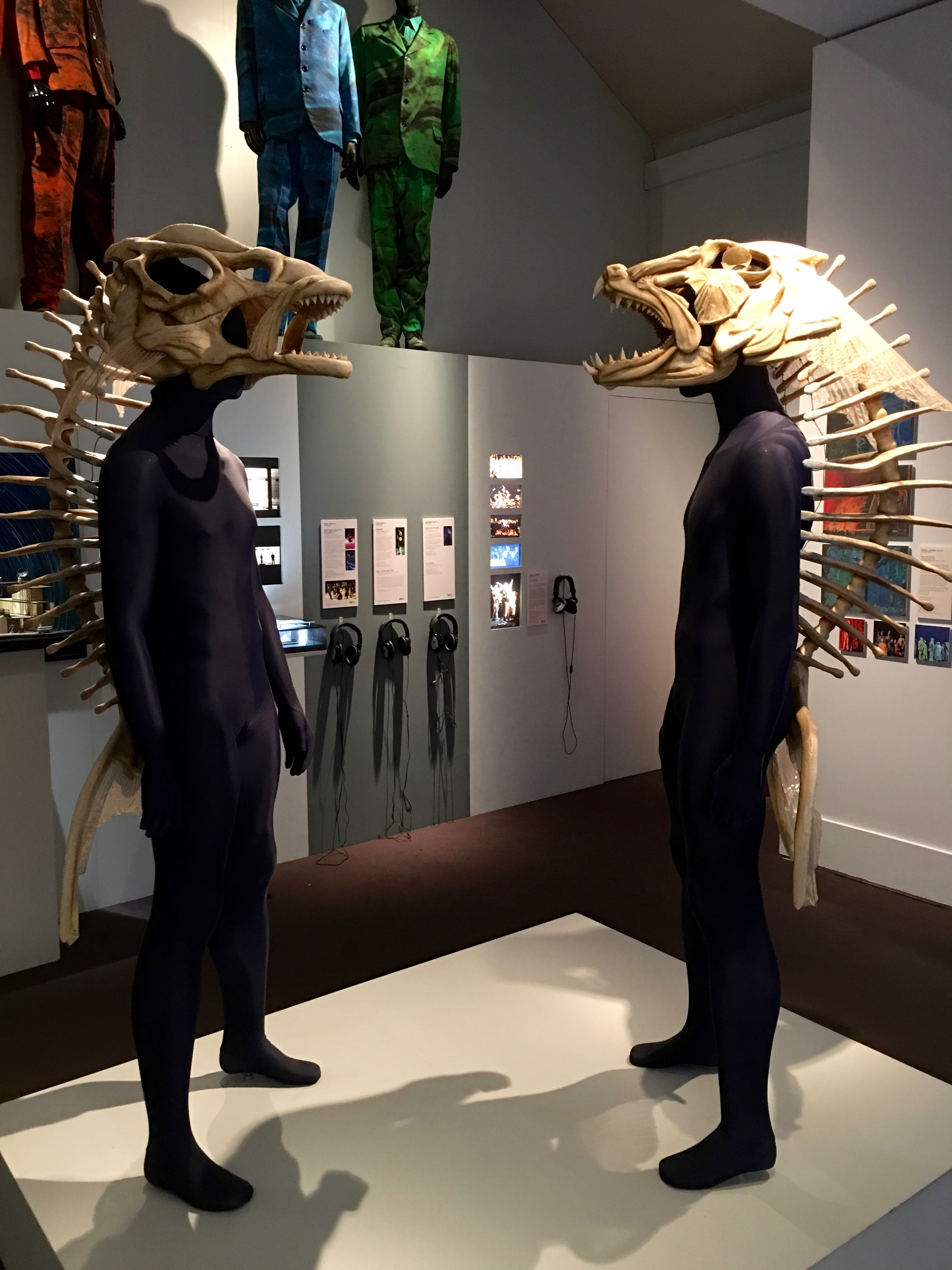
Costumes from the residency on display

Before the Dawn was presented as a multi-media performance involving standard rock music performance, dancers, puppets, shadows, maskwork, conceptual staging, 3D animation and an illusionist. Bush spent three days in a flotation tank for filmed scenes that were played during the performance, and featured dialogue written by novelist David Mitchell. Also involved with the production were Adrian Noble, former artistic director and chief executive of the Royal Shakespeare Company, costume designer Brigitte Reiffenstuel, lighting designer Mark Henderson and Italian Shadows Theatre company Controluce Teatro d'Ombre. The illusionist was Paul Kieve, the puppeteer Basil Twist, the movement director Sian Williams and the designer Dick Bird. The video and projection design was by Jon Driscoll.

The performance was centred on a band featuring the following musicians:

- Kate Bush – vocals (plus occasional piano/keyboards)
- David Rhodes – guitar
- Friðrik Karlsson – guitar, bouzouki, charango
- John Giblin – bass guitar, double bass
- Jon Carin – keyboards, guitar, vocals, programming
- Kevin McAlea – keyboards, accordion, uilleann pipes
- Omar Hakim – drums
- Mino Cinélu – percussion

and the following actors:

- Albert McIntosh – chorus, Son, Painter
- Jo Servi – chorus, Witchfinder
- Bob Harms – chorus, Dad
- Sandra Marvin – chorus
- Jacqui DuBois – chorus
- Ben Thompson – Lord of the Waves, Tesoro
- Stuart Angell – Lord of the Waves, Painter's Apprentice
- Christian Jenner – Blackbird Spirit
- Sean Myatt, Richard Booth, Emily Cooper, Lane Paul Stewart, Charlotte Williams – Supporting actors

Bush's son, Albert McIntosh, who performed in the show as a backing vocalist and actor, was also credited as creative advisor. Keyboard player Kevin McAlea is notable for also having played on the Tour of Life, Bush's previous concert series in 1979.

Parts of the show told stories based on two Bush song-suites – "The Ninth Wave" from Hounds of Love and "A Sky of Honey" from Aerial.

During "The Ninth Wave", Bush's character is lost at sea after her ship, the Celtic Deep, sinks. She fades in and out of consciousness, sometimes underwater and sometimes above, hoping to be rescued with only a flickering red light to make her seen in the darkness. She has an almost out-of-body experience, observing herself as though under ice, seeing her family without her, and imagining entering Earth's atmosphere until she is found; survival has given her a new appreciation of love and life. Then, in "A Sky of Honey", Bush portrays a bird-like woman observing the actions of a 19th-century painter and a wooden puppet.

Bush asked concert attendees not to use mobile phones, cameras, or tablets at the shows.

== Reception ==
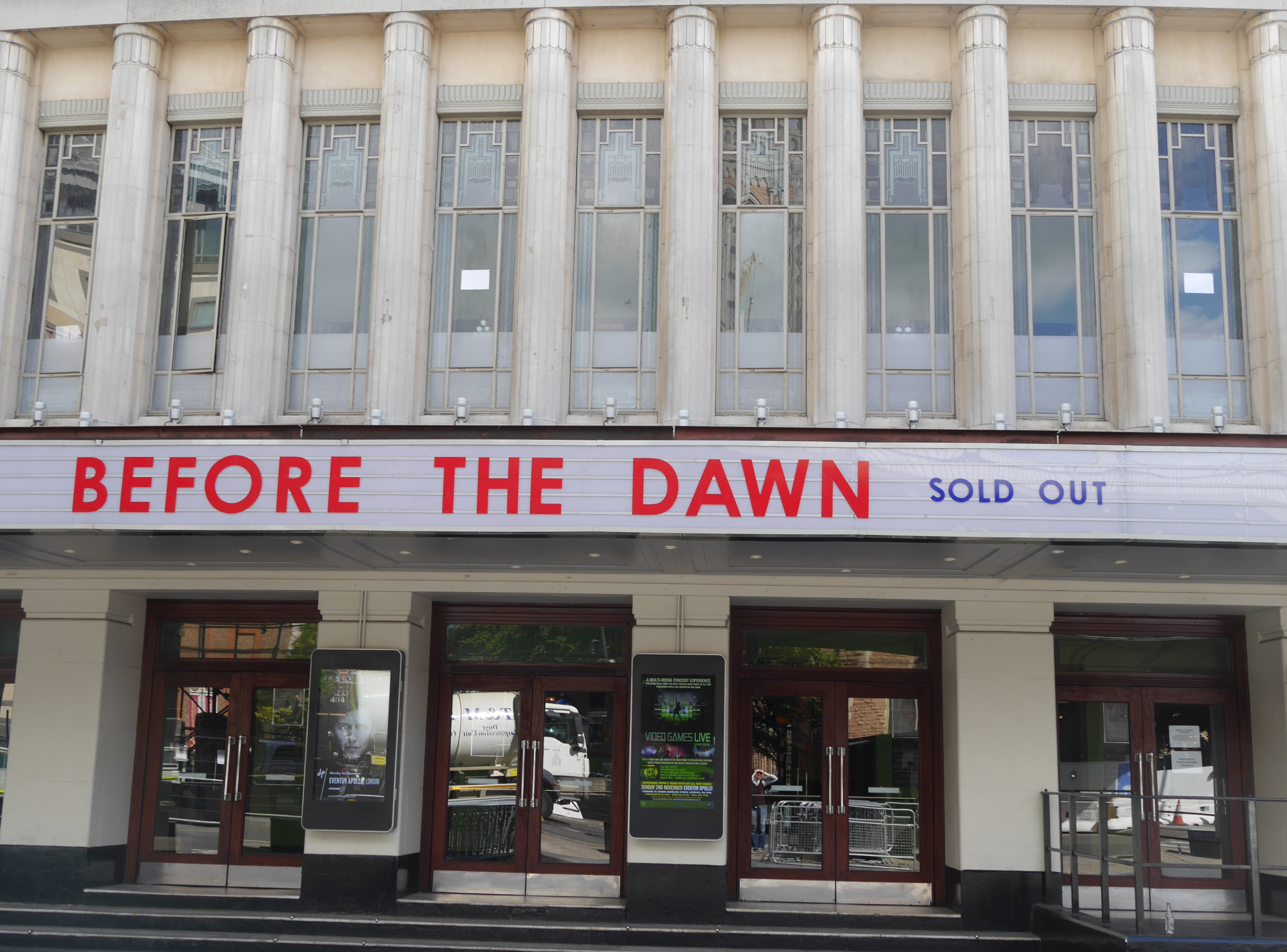
The exterior of the venue during the residency

The news of the residency prompted a surge of interest in Bush, with a number of music websites, radio stations and newspapers running the story, as well as causing Bush's own website to crash due to the high web traffic. Bush was said to be "completely overwhelmed by the response to the shows", adding she was "looking forward to seeing you all later this year". In the week before the show's debut, The New York Times ran an article documenting Bush fans who were traveling from around the world to attend the show.

The show received widespread critical acclaim. The Evening Standard gave the opening show five stars out of five, commenting: "[an] extraordinary mix of magical ideas, stunning visuals, attention to detail and remarkable music ... she was so obviously, so unambiguously brilliant, made last night something to tell the grandchildren about." Alexis Petridis of The Guardian gave the show five stars out of five, calling the show "another remarkable achievement". Following the first week of performances, eight of Bush's albums charted within the UK Top 40, making her the first female artist in history to achieve this, with The Whole Story at number six and Hounds of Love at number nine being the highest charting.

== Credits ==
=== Production credits ===
- Before the Dawn – written by Kate Bush
- Directed by – Kate Bush, Adrian Noble
- Creative advisor – Albert McIntosh
- Lighting designer – Mark Henderson
- Set designer – Dick Bird
- Projection designer – Jon Driscoll for Cinelumina
- Creative consultant – Robert Allsopp
- Costume designer – Brigitte Reiffenstuel
- Movement direction – Sian Williams
- Oceanic wave design – Basil Twist
- Illusionist – Paul Kieve

=== Management ===
- Concert director – David Taraskevics (David T)
- Production director – Keely Myers
- Assistant to concert director – George Sinclair

=== Show production ===
- Production manager – Simon Marlow
- Production coordinator – Georgie King
- Technical stage manager – Richard "Wez" Wearing
- Stage manager – Dan Shipton
- Show caller – Sharon Hobden
- Head of wardrobe – Natasha DeSampayo
- Wardrobe assistant – Kerry Harris
- Production runner – Dom Dryburgh

=== Sound credits ===
- Sound designer / FOH engineer – Greg Walsh
- Monitor engineer – Ian Newton
- Kate vocal navigator – Stephen W. Tayler
- FOH sound engineer / systems engineer – Davide Lombardi
- Stage tech – Baz Tymms
- Surround systems engineer – Davey Williamson
- Sounds FX consultant – James Drew
- Record archive – Ian Sylvester
- Record supervisor – Jim Jones

=== Backline credits ===
- Guitar and bass technician – Chris Lawson
- Keyboard (and guitar) technician – Morten "Turbo" Thobro
- Drums and percussion technician – Steve Gray

== Set list ==
The set list comprised most of Hounds of Love featuring the entire The Ninth Wave suite, most of Aerial including the entire A Sky of Honey suite, two songs from The Red Shoes, and one song from 50 Words for Snow. Bush's first four albums and The Sensual World were excluded from the set list, though a recording of "Never Be Mine" (supposedly from initial rehearsals) is included on the CD and LP releases.

All tracks were performed live for the first time, except "Running Up That Hill", which had been already performed live in 1987 with David Gilmour of Pink Floyd at the Secret Policeman's Third Ball.

Act One

1. "Lily"
2. "Hounds of Love"
3. "Joanni"
4. "Top of the City"
5. "Running Up That Hill (A Deal with God)" (Extended)
6. "King of the Mountain" (Extended)

Act Two: The Ninth Wave

7. Video Interlude – "And Dream of Sheep"
8. "Under Ice"
9. "Waking the Witch"
10. "Watching You Without Me"
11. "Jig of Life"
12. "Hello Earth"
13. "The Morning Fog"

Act Three: A Sky of Honey

14. "Prelude"
15. "Prologue" (extended)
16. "An Architect's Dream"
17. "The Painter's Link"
18. "Sunset"
19. "Aerial Tal"
20. "Somewhere in Between" (extended)
21. "Tawny Moon" (performed by Albert McIntosh)
22. "Nocturn" (extended)
23. "Aerial"

Encore

24. "Among Angels"
25. "Cloudbusting"

== Show dates ==
- 26 August 2014
- 27 August 2014
- 29 August 2014
- 30 August 2014
- 2 September 2014
- 3 September 2014
- 5 September 2014
- 6 September 2014
- 9 September 2014
- 10 September 2014
- 12 September 2014
- 13 September 2014
- 16 September 2014
- 17 September 2014
- 19 September 2014
- 20 September 2014
- 23 September 2014
- 24 September 2014
- 26 September 2014
- 27 September 2014
- 30 September 2014
- 1 October 2014
