= On Stage (EP) =

EP by Kate Bush
- Released: 31 August 1979
- Recorded: 13 May 1979
- Venue: Hammersmith Odeon (London)
- Genre: Art rock
- Length: 16:51
- Labels: EMI, Harvest (Canada)
- Producers: Kate Bush, Jon Kelly

Kate Bush chronology
| Lionheart (1978) | On Stage (1979) | Never for Ever (1980) |

Professional ratings
Review scores
| Source | Rating |
|---|---|
| AllMusic | 3/5 stars |
| Edmonton Journal | 9/10 |
| MusicHound Rock | 2.5/5 stars |
| Spin Alternative Record Guide | 5/10 |

On Stage is a live recording of four songs performed on Kate Bush's Tour of Life in 1979. It was released on 31 August 1979 and peaked at number 10 on the UK chart. The EP sold 5,980 units in Japan.

== Background ==
On Stage contains recordings ostensibly from Bush's concert recorded live at the Hammersmith Odeon on 13 May 1979. However, the four tracks on this EP are noticeably different from those released in 1994, when 60 minutes of the 13 May 1979 concert was issued on audio CD. On Stage became Bush's first official (non-bootlegged) live performance on vinyl.

The record was usually issued in various global markets as a four-track 7-inch disc running at 33 rpm. It was also released on 12-inch vinyl in some countries (Japan, Netherlands, Canada, France and Australia – with 45 rpm and 33 rpm speeds). Uniquely, Canada also issued the EP as a cassette. In the UK EMI issued the EP (as a promotional item) over four sides of two 7-inch discs packaged in a gatefold sleeve. A 2-disc version was also chosen as the commercial Portuguese issue. The commercially available UK 7-inch version (a single disc featuring all four tracks on one record) was initially packaged in a gatefold sleeve (similar to the promotional edition) which was quickly replaced by a single-pocket version. Canada also issued a variant of the 7-inch single in a gatefold sleeve packaged inside a limited edition 12-inch outer cover.

The EP's peak at No 10 gave Bush her third UK top 10 hit. Studio versions of all four songs were originally released on her first two albums; "Them Heavy People", "James and the Cold Gun" and "L'Amour Looks Something Like You" from The Kick Inside (1978) and "Don't Push Your Foot on the Heartbrake" from Lionheart (1978).

== Track listing ==
All tracks are written by Kate Bush.

Side one
| No. | Title | Length |
|---|---|---|
| 1. | "Them Heavy People" | 4:08 |
| 2. | "Don't Push Your Foot on the Heartbrake" | 3:37 |

Side two
| No. | Title | Length |
|---|---|---|
| 3. | "James and the Cold Gun" | 6:25 |
| 4. | "L'Amour Looks Something Like You" | 2:41 |

- 7": EMI / EMI MIEP 2991 (UK)

== Charts ==
| Chart (1979–1983) | Peak position |
|---|---|
| Canadian RPM Albums Chart | 57 |
| Dutch Single Top 100 | 17 |
| Irish Singles Chart | 15 |
| UK Singles Chart | 10 |
