= Anthony Van Laast =

British choreographer (born 1951)

Anthony Van Laast CBE is a British choreographer born 31 May 1951 in Sussex, UK. He has worked mainly for the stage, concerts, television and film. His works have appeared in the West End and on Broadway.

== Career ==
Van Laast received dance training at the London School of Contemporary Dance, and both performed and choreographed with the company.

In 1979, he worked with Kate Bush in preparation for her tour. Among his prominent stage works as a choreographer are the musicals Sister Act (2011 on Broadway and 2009 West End), Bombay Dreams (2004), Mamma Mia! (2001), Joseph and the Amazing Technicolor Dreamcoat (1993), Annie Get Your Gun (1986, West End), and Song & Dance (1982, West End). He co-directed and choreographed EFX, the Las Vegas stage show at the MGM Grand starring Michael Crawford in 1995. He has choreographed for Holiday on Ice, including "Extravaganza" in 1997, "Hollywood" (2002), and he is the artistic director for "Mystery" (2009).

His television and film work includes the concert Sarah Brightman: Symphony in Vienna (2008), Beauty and the Beast (2017 film), and Harry Potter and the Deathly Hallows – Part 1.

He received a nomination for the Tony Award, Best Choreography, jointly with Farah Khan for Bombay Dreams. For his work on the musical Hair (Old Vic) and for The Beggar's Opera (the Royal Shakespeare Company at the Barbican), he was nominated for the Olivier Award, Best Theatre Choreographer in 1994. Van Laast was awarded the MBE for Services to Dance and Choreography in 1999. He was appointed Commander of the Order of the British Empire (CBE) in the 2019 New Year Honours for services to Dance and Choreography.

Van Laast is a patron of the Urdang Academy.
