= 50 Words for Snow =

Studio album by Kate Bush
- Released: 21 November 2011
- Recorded: 2010–2011
- Studio: Abbey Road (London)
- Genres: Art pop; jazz; chamber pop; jazz-rock; experimental
- Length: 65:29
- Label: Fish People
- Producer: Kate Bush

Kate Bush chronology
Director's Cut (2011)	50 Words for Snow (2011)	Before the Dawn (2016)

Singles from 50 Words for Snow
- 1. "Wild Man" Released: 11 October 2011; 2. "Snowflake" Released: 25 October 2024

50 Words for Snow is the tenth studio album by English singer-songwriter Kate Bush, released on 21 November 2011. It was the second album released on her own label, Fish People, and Bush's first all-new material since Aerial (2005). The album was promoted by the single "Wild Man"; a further single, "Snowflake", followed in October 2024, alongside a short film in support of War Child.

== Background and release ==
50 Words for Snow was released on 21 November 2011, Bush's second album of that year, following Director's Cut. The album consists of seven songs "set against a background of falling snow" and has a running time of 65 minutes. The songs "Lake Tahoe" and "Misty" are the two longest songs in Bush's catalogue and her only individual songs that are over ten minutes long. In November 2018, Bush released box sets of remasters of her studio albums, including 50 Words for Snow.

A radio edit of the first single, "Wild Man", was played on BBC Radio 2's Ken Bruce Show on 10 October. The single, featuring both the radio edit as well as the album version, was released on 11 October. Andy Fairweather Low guest stars on this story of a group of people exploring the Himalayas who, upon finding evidence of the elusive, mythical Yeti, out of compassion cover up all traces of its footprints. Priya Elan in the New Musical Express greeted the single with enthusiasm, saying: "For those of us who have been secretly longing for a return to the unflinchingly bizarre and Bush's ability to conjure up strange new worlds, 'Wild Man' is a deep joy."

"Everyone will know that events in Tibet have taken a terrible turn. I want to express my sadness at such a gentle and spiritual culture suffering so greatly. I am so shocked by the desperate measures being taken by people whose only way to call out for help is by taking these horrific actions. I would feel ashamed if I didn’t express my feelings. I just hope the world is listening."

— Bush expressing her concerns about Tibet in 2011 prior album's release

In an interview with the American radio station KCRW, Bush said that the idea for the album's title song came from thinking about how the Eskimo have 50 words for snow, which led her to use fantastical words and phrases, such as "spangladasha", "blown from Polar fur", and "Robber's Veil". The album's songs are built around Bush's quietly jazzy piano and Steve Gadd's drums (she had just started working with him and praised his "brilliant drumming"), and utilize both sung and spoken word vocals in what Classic Rock's Stephen Dalton calls "a...supple and experimental affair, with a contemporary chamber pop sound grounded in crisp piano, minimal percussion and light-touch electronics...billowing jazz-rock soundscapes, interwoven with fragmentary narratives delivered in a range of voices from shrill to Laurie Anderson-style cooing." Bassist Danny Thompson also appears on the album.

The album's opening track, "Snowflake", was written specifically to use the high choir-boy voice of Bush's son Albert, who sang the role of a falling snowflake in a song expressing the hope of a noisy world soon being hushed by snowfall. A radio edit of the song was released as a single on 25 October 2024, in conjunction with Bush's short animated film, Little Shrew, which the song soundtracks.

"Lake Tahoe" features choral singers Stefan Roberts and Michael Wood joining Bush in a song about a rarely seen ghost: a woman who appears in a Victorian gown to call to her dog, Snowflake. Bush explained to fellow musician Jamie Cullum in an interview on Dutch Radio that she wished to explore using high male voices in contrast to her own, deeper, voice. "Misty" is about a snowman lover who melts away after a night of passion, and after "Wild Man", Elton John and Bush as eternally divided lovers trade vocals on "Snowed In at Wheeler Street", while actor Stephen Fry recites the "50 Words for Snow". The quiet love song "Among Angels" finishes the album.

Two stop-motion animation videos were released online to promote the album, one to accompany a section of "Misty" (called "Mistraldespair"), the other to accompany a section of "Wild Man". "Mistraldespair" was directed by Bush and animated by Tommy Thompson and Gary Pureton, while the "Wild Man" segment was created by Finn and Patrick at Brandt Animation. On 24 January 2012, a third piece called "Eider Falls at Lake Tahoe", was premiered on her website and on YouTube. Running at 5:01, the piece is a black-and-white shadow puppet animation that NPR's Dan Raby calls "...beautiful in its simplicity – emphasizing small subtle movements over big extravagance... The stark contrast between the black figures and the white world makes each set piece seem mystical." Directed by Bush and photographed by award-winning British cinematographer Roger Pratt, the shadow puppets were designed by Robert Allsopp.

The album's closing track, "Among Angels", was included in the setlist of Bush's Before the Dawn concerts in 2014. In 2015, a remixed version of "Wild Man" was included on The Art of Peace − Songs for Tibet II compilation album celebrating the 80th birthday of the Dalai Lama.

== Critical and commercial reception ==
Professional ratings
Aggregate scores
Source	Rating
AnyDecentMusic?	8.2/10
Metacritic	85/100
Review scores
Source	Rating
AllMusic	4/5 stars
The Daily Telegraph	5/5 stars
Entertainment Weekly	A−
The Guardian	5/5 stars
The Independent	5/5 stars
Los Angeles Times	3.5/4 stars
NME	7/10
Pitchfork	8.5/10
Rolling Stone	3.5/5 stars
Spin	7/10

On 27 November, 50 Words for Snow entered the UK album charts at No. 5, making Bush the first female recording artist to have an album of all-new material in the top five during each of the last five decades. Despite being released in the eleventh month of 2011, it was the eighth best-selling vinyl album of the year. It also peaked at No. 83 on the Billboard 200 in the United States, while reaching No. 7 on the Independent Albums chart.

50 Words for Snow received widespread acclaim from most music critics. At Metacritic, which assigns a normalised rating out of 100 to reviews from mainstream critics, the album received an average score of 85, based on 35 reviews, which indicates "universal acclaim".

On 14 November 2011, NPR played the album in its entirety for the first time. In her accompanying review of the album, NPR music critic Ann Powers writes: "Each song on Snow grows as if from magic beans from the lush ground of the singer-songwriter's keyboard parts. The music is immersive but spacious, jazz-tinged and lushly electronic – the 53-year-old Bush, a prime inspiration for tech-savvy young auteurs ranging from St. Vincent to hip-hop's Big Boi, pioneered the use of digital samplers in the 1980s and is still an avid aural manipulator. This time around, drummer Steve Gadd is her most important interlocutor – the veteran studio player's gentle but firm touch draws the frame around each of her expanding landscapes. But Bush won't be restricted. Like [Joni] Mitchell on Don Juan's Restless Daughter^{[sic]}, she takes her time and lets her characters lead." The Guardian's Alexis Petridis notes that "For all the subtle beauty of the orchestrations, there's an organic, live feel, the sense of musicians huddled together in a room, not something that's happened on a Bush album before."

Will Hermes in Rolling Stone writes: "[50 Words for Snow is] an LP that finds a universe of emotions in its wintery theme – a sort of virtual snowglobe ... the music ... is full of plush, drifty ambience. The vocals sound nothing like the fierce cyberbabe on her 1982 LP The Dreaming, or the strange angels on Hounds of Love, but they are no less sublime ... she sounds utterly at home defining her own world. It's an amazing place." Everything Entertainment Central's Tim David Harvey says: "The album begins with the beautiful fall of a song called 'Snowflake', before getting operatic, strange and even more sublime with 'Lake Tahoe' which is as deep and decedent as the place itself, it's that kind of picturesque music," and goes on to call the album "unique, concise, cohesive classic".

The Quietus' Joe Kennedy compares 50 Words for Snow to the work of such artists as Michael Nyman, Brian Eno and Scott Walker, writing "Snow brings about a state of exception in which there's no pressure to exert ourselves on the outside world: instead, it invites contemplativeness and the prioritisation of personal and domestic relationships over professional ones. Bush's habitual provocations to abandon day-to-day concerns while cultivating romantic, internal landscapes have always felt slightly like the work of someone gazing from a window into a blizzard. This, one senses, is her natural territory...Where her past work has often been heavily-layered and breathless, 50 Words for Snow uses negative space to impressive effect; much of the album features little more than voice and flurrying passages of piano which gust across the stave, changing pace and melodic direction as if they're suddenly hitting updrafts." Other critics take exception to some of Bush's choices, greeting the album with scepticism. Ludovic Hunter-Tilsley in The Financial Times warns that despite "slow eddies of piano chords and gentle percussion ... wintry piano, atmospheric orchestral arrangements and an intimate, torch-lit vocal from Bush, who, at 53, has acquired a warm huskiness to her voice ... the album wobbles with the hammy Elton John duet "Snowed In at Wheeler St", and topples over on the title track in which Bush invites Stephen Fry to dream up 50 terms for snow ... 50 Words for Snow elucidates its wintry theme with flashes of brilliance but the odd treacherous icy patch too";

Australia's ABC Radio National declared 50 Words for Snow album of the week of 12 November 2011, calling the album "quiet, lush and otherworldly". Mojo placed the album at No. 5 on its list of "Top 50 albums of 2011" while Stereogum placed the album at No. 11, Pitchfork placed the album at No. 36 and Uncut placed it at No. 40 on their lists.

Bush was nominated for 2012 BRIT Awards as Best British Female Solo Artist, but lost to Adele. She also made her first public appearance after 10 years, picking the South Bank Sky Arts Award in the Pop category for 50 Words for Snow, beating fellow nominees Adele, for 21 and PJ Harvey, for Let England Shake. The same three albums were nominated for the Best Album award at the 2012 Ivor Novello Awards, won by PJ Harvey. In 2019, Pitchfork ranked the release at No. 191 in their list of "The 200 Best Albums of the 2010s"; editor Katherine St. Asaph describes the album as "music that rewards close attention in an age where that is increasingly rare".

== Track listing ==
All tracks are written by Kate Bush.

No.	Title	Length
1.	"Snowflake"	9:52
2.	"Lake Tahoe"	11:08
3.	"Misty"	13:32
4.	"Wild Man"	7:17
5.	"Snowed In at Wheeler Street" (featuring Elton John)	8:05
6.	"50 Words for Snow"	8:31
7.	"Among Angels"	6:49
Total length:		65:06

== Personnel ==
- Kate Bush – vocals, piano (1–3, 5, 7), backing vocals (4), bass guitar (1), keyboards (4–6)
- Dan McIntosh – guitar (1, 3–6)
- Del Palmer – bass guitar (1), bells (4)
- Danny Thompson – double bass (3)
- John Giblin – bass guitar (4–6)
- Steve Gadd – drums (1–6)
- Albert McIntosh – lead vocal (1)
- Michael Wood and Stefan Roberts – featured vocal (2)
- Andy Fairweather-Low – backing vocals (4)
- Elton John – featured vocal (5)
- Stephen Fry (as Prof. Joseph Yupik) – recitation (6)

Production

- Produced by Kate Bush
- Recorded by Del Palmer
- Additional recording by Stephen W. Tayler
- Mixed by Stephen W. Tayler
- Assisted by Stanley Gabriel
- Additional assistants: Jim Jones, Robert Houston, Patrick Phillips and Kris Burton
- Mastered by Doug Sax and James Guthrie
- Assisted by Eric Boulanger
- Orchestral arrangements by Jonathan Tunick
- Orchestra conducted by Jonathan Tunick
- Orchestra sessions recorded at Abbey Road Studios
- Recorded by Simon Rhodes
- Assisted by Chris Bolster and John Barrett

== Charts ==
=== Weekly charts ===
Weekly chart performance for 50 Words for Snow
Chart (2011–2012)	Peak position
Australian Albums (ARIA)	22
Austrian Albums (Ö3 Austria)	26
Belgian Albums (Ultratop Flanders)	18
Belgian Albums (Ultratop Wallonia)	38
Canadian Albums (Nielsen SoundScan)	39
Croatian Albums (HDU)	25
Czech Albums (ČNS IFPI)	41
Danish Albums (Hitlisten)	16
Dutch Albums (Album Top 100)	10
Finnish Albums (Suomen virallinen lista)	8
French Albums (SNEP)	21
German Albums (Offizielle Top 100)	7
Greek Albums (IFPI)	51
Irish Albums (IRMA)	12
Irish Independent Albums (IRMA)	3
Italian Albums (FIMI)	38
Japanese Albums (Oricon)	49
New Zealand Albums (RMNZ)	39
Norwegian Albums (VG-lista)	13
Polish Albums (ZPAV)	37
Scottish Albums (Official Charts)	10
Swedish Albums (Sverigetopplistan)	13
Swiss Albums (Schweizer Hitparade)	12
UK Albums (Official Charts)	5
US Billboard 200	83
US Independent Albums (Billboard)	7
US Top Alternative Albums (Billboard)	9
US Top Rock Albums (Billboard)	13

Weekly chart performance for 50 Words for Snow
Chart (2014)	Peak position
UK Albums (Official Charts)	20

=== Year-end charts ===
Year-end chart performance for 50 Words for Snow
Chart (2011)	Position
Danish Albums (Hitlisten)	78
Dutch Albums (Album Top 100)	88
French Albums (SNEP)	188
UK Albums (OCC)	93

== Certifications and sales ==
Certifications and sales for 50 Words for Snow
Region	Certification	Certified units/sales
France	—	20,000
United Kingdom (BPI)	Gold	155,000
United States	—	42,889
