= Wild Man (Kate Bush song) =

Single by Kate Bush

from the album 50 Words for Snow
- Released: 10 October 2011
- Genre: Art rock
- Length: 7:16; 4:16 (radio edit)
- Label: Noble & Brite
- Songwriter: Kate Bush
- Producer: Kate Bush

Kate Bush singles chronology
"Deeper Understanding" (2011)	"Wild Man" (2011)	"Running Up That Hill (A Deal with God)" (2012 Remix) (2012)

Audio video
- "Wild Man" on YouTube

"Wild Man" is a song by Kate Bush released as the lead single from her tenth studio album 50 Words for Snow. It was released as a digital download single in the United Kingdom on 11 October 2011, and peaked at number 73 on the UK Singles Chart. "Wild Man" tells the story of sightings of the Yeti in the wilds of the Himalayas, and of the efforts by the narrator and others to protect him from discovery.

== Background ==
The song premiered on BBC Radio 2 on Monday 10 October 2011. The 7:16-minute version was first played on The Ken Bruce Show and the 4:16-minute "radio edit" was made available for streaming on Kate Bush's official YouTube channel after the radio premiere.

The full-length "Wild Man" was released as a digital download single on 11 October, and it was announced that there would be no CD single. The song was BBC Radio 2's "Record of the Week" for the week starting 16 October.

A 2-minute 33-second "Animation Segment" for "Wild Man" was posted on the Kate Bush official site and on YouTube. The short film was created by Finn and Patrick at Brandt Animation.

In 2015, Bush contributed the track to The Art of Peace − Songs for Tibet II music compilation album, devoted to the 80th birthday of 14th Dalai Lama. Proceeds from the album were used to help preserve and promote the wisdom of the Dalai Lama and Tibetan culture. The song was remixed and retitled as "Wild Man (Remastered Shimmer)".

== Track listing ==
Digital download

1. "Wild Man" (radio edit) – 4:16 (except in the US)
2. "Wild Man" – 7:16

== Personnel ==
- Kate Bush – vocals, backing vocals, keyboards
- Andy Fairweather Low – vocals
- Dan McIntosh – guitar
- John Giblin – bass
- Steve Gadd – drums

== Charts ==
Chart performance for "Wild Man"
Chart (2011)	Peak position
UK Singles (OCC)	73

== Release history ==
Region	Date	Format	Label
United Kingdom	11 October 2011	Digital download	Noble & Brite
