= Trevor Leighton =

British photographer (born 1957)

Trevor Leighton (born 1957) is a Carlisle-born photographer. Leighton has one of the largest collections of archive photographs by a single photographer in the National Portrait Gallery, London.

Leighton specialises in celebrity portraiture, fashion, and pop videos. Leighton was described by British Comedy Guide as a "legendary comedy photographer." His clients have included Kate Bush, Dawn French, John Hurt, Bob Monkhouse, Lisa Snowden and Kareena Kapoor. He has also photographed for The Fairtrade Foundation, including portraits of Vic Reeves, Amanda Burton, Fearne Cotton, Richard Wilson, and Harry Hill.

Leighton authored the book The Jokers, published in 1999 by Pavilion Books. The Jokers is a coffee-table book featuring portraits of television, radio, and stage comedians. Photographs from this book were also featured in a National Portrait Gallery touring exhibition entitled "Comedians: From the 1940s to Now".

His portrait of Jennifer Saunders and Joanna Lumley, the stars of Absolutely Fabulous, was included in the British 'faces of the century' National Portrait Gallery exhibition in 1999.
