= Lionheart (Kate Bush album) =

Studio album by Kate Bush
- Released: 10 November 1978
- Recorded: 7 July – September 1978
- Studios: Super Bear Studios (Berre-les-Alpes, France)
- Genres: Progressive pop; art pop; baroque pop; art rock
- Length: 36:32
- Labels: EMI (UK); EMI America (US); Harvest (Canada)
- Producers: Andrew Powell assisted by Kate Bush

Kate Bush chronology
| The Kick Inside (1978) | Lionheart (1978) | On Stage (1979) |

Singles from Lionheart
- 1. "Hammer Horror" Released: 3 November 1978; 2. "Wow" Released: 9 March 1979; 3. "Symphony in Blue" Released: 5 May 1979 (Japan)

Lionheart is the second studio album by the English singer-songwriter Kate Bush. It was released on 10 November 1978, nine months after Bush's successful debut album The Kick Inside. Lionheart peaked at No. 6 on the UK Albums Chart (her only album not to make the top 5), and has been certified Platinum by the BPI.

The first single taken from the album, "Hammer Horror", missed the UK Top 40. The follow-up single, "Wow", was released on the back of Bush's UK tour and peaked at No. 14 in the UK singles chart. The album is generally rated as one of the weaker releases in Bush's discography, and Bush herself was reportedly not happy with the finished product, feeling it rushed.

== Overview ==
=== Background ===
Following the success of her debut album, Kate Bush's record company EMI were eager to get another out. Bush had composed many songs throughout her teens (she was at this time 19 years old); the majority of the tracks used for Lionheart were compositions from before her debut. Bush, however, was unhappy with the short length of time she had in which to produce the album. Recorded entirely at Super Bear Studios in Berre-les-Alpes on the French Riviera, this was to be her only album recorded outside the UK.

Of the ten tracks, only "Symphony in Blue", "Fullhouse" and "Coffee Homeground" were newly composed songs, although the other songs had been reworked by Bush in preparation for the recording. The album was produced, like her first, by Andrew Powell, with Bush feeling that she was at this stage too inexperienced to produce it herself (she would go on to produce all her following albums). Since the album's release, Bush has many times said that she was unhappy with this album because of the restrictions imposed on it. In a 1989 interview she remarked: "Considering how quickly we made it it's a bloody good album, but I'm not really happy with it".

Bush said in a 1978 interview that some of the lyrics pertained to childhood. Literary references include J. M. Barrie's Peter Pan in "In Search of Peter Pan" (a song which also quotes "When You Wish Upon a Star" from the Disney film Pinocchio), as well as a nod towards Arsenic and Old Lace in the song "Coffee Homeground", which despite being similar in plot to the play, was inspired by a taxi driver who drove Bush once. Film references include "Hammer Horror", while although taking its name from the Hammer Film studios, is actually about a production of The Hunchback of Notre-Dame. The British television show The Sweeney, a popular police drama from the 1970s, was mentioned in the lyrics of the song "Wow", which is a song about the music business and show business in general. "Kashka from Baghdad", inspired by American detective series, is about the inhabitants of a town wondering about a couple living in an old house.

Lionheart was the first Kate Bush album to feature Del Palmer, who played bass and had previously been in the KT Bush Band. Palmer went on to play bass, or to engineer and record on every subsequent Kate Bush album up to and including 50 Words for Snow (2011). He and Bush also had a long-term relationship between the late 1970s and early 1990s.

== Release ==
The album was released in November 1978, the title being taken from side one's closing track "Oh England My Lionheart". The front cover shot depicts Bush in an attic wearing a lion outfit, which she described as being "slightly comical". The photographer was Gered Mankowitz. The lead single chosen was "Hammer Horror", which peaked at a low 44 in the UK (although fared better in many other countries). The album however performed well in the UK, peaking at No. 6. It remained on the chart well into 1979, its promotion being continued by the second single and Bush's UK tour. In total it spent 36 weeks on the chart and was certified Platinum by the BPI for sales of over 300,000, making it one of Bush's better-selling albums. The second single from the album was "Wow", which was released in March 1979. This fared better than the first, peaking at No. 14 in the UK and performing well in many other countries also. In some territories, "Symphony in Blue" was released instead. Around this time, Bush embarked on her first tour, which featured a number of songs from Lionheart – one of these ("Don't Push Your Foot on the Heartbrake") was included on the On Stage EP in September 1979.

In the US, the album was initially unreleased following the failure of her debut. As Bush gained a cult following over the coming years however, Lionheart was belatedly released in 1984 following the entry into the charts of her fourth album The Dreaming.

In November 2018, Bush released box sets of remasters of her studio albums, including Lionheart.

== Critical reception ==
Professional ratings
Review scores
| Source | Rating |
|---|---|
| AllMusic | 3/5 stars |
| Drowned in Sound | 7/10 |
| Encyclopedia of Popular Music | 3/5 stars |
| The Great Rock Discography | 5/10 |
| Mojo | 3/5 stars |
| MusicHound Rock | 2/5 stars |
| Record Mirror | 2.5/5 stars |
| The Rolling Stone Album Guide | 2/5 stars |
| Sounds | 4/5 stars |
| Spin Alternative Record Guide | 5/10 |

Reception to the album was average, with the album almost universally being looked upon as an inferior version of her debut. NME's Ian Penman wrote: "'Mature' lyrics sung in that twee irritating schoolgirl-siren voice [...] Actually most of the time she's nearer a vague British lineage – Barbara Dickson to Lynsey de Paul – than a Joni/Janis wonderland". Record Mirror was not convinced and wrote about the performance between the musicians: "The feel is often bland and soulless". Reviewer Chris Westwood concluded: "A product which is at best moderate, lacking and often severely irritating... This is flat conceived silliness." The American magazine Trouser Press rated it well, in particular the songs "Symphony in Blue", "In the Warm Room" and "Don't Push Your Foot on the Heartbrake".

In a retrospective review for AllMusic, Mike DeGagne feels that the album lacks substance, while noting that Bush was capable of much better work. In a Guardian poll of Bush's best albums, Lionheart placed lowly with just 2% of the vote. While Bush herself has said that she was unhappy with the finished album, she has mentioned satisfaction with the track "Wow".

== Track listing ==
All tracks written by Kate Bush.

Side one
| No. | Title | Length |
|---|---|---|
| 1. | "Symphony in Blue" | 3:35 |
| 2. | "In Search of Peter Pan" | 3:46 |
| 3. | "Wow" | 3:58 |
| 4. | "Don't Push Your Foot on the Heartbrake" | 3:12 |
| 5. | "Oh England My Lionheart" | 3:10 |

Side two
| No. | Title | Length |
|---|---|---|
| 6. | "Fullhouse" | 3:14 |
| 7. | "In the Warm Room" | 3:35 |
| 8. | "Kashka from Baghdad" | 3:55 |
| 9. | "Coffee Homeground" | 3:38 |
| 10. | "Hammer Horror" | 4:39 |

Notes:

- "In Search of Peter Pan" contains an excerpt of "When You Wish Upon a Star", written by Leigh Harline and Ned Washington.

== Personnel ==
- Kate Bush – vocals, piano, assistant arranger, harmony vocals (4, 5)
- Andrew Powell – arranger, joanna strumentum (8), harmonium (10)
- Duncan Mackay – Fender Rhodes (1, 2, 4), synthesizer (3, 9, 10)
- 4B – synthesizer (3)
- Francis Monkman – harpsichord (4, 5), Hammond organ (6)
- Richard Harvey – recorders (5)
- Ian Bairnson – electric guitar (1–4, 6, 10), acoustic guitar (2, 10), rhythm guitar (9)
- Paddy Bush – mandolins (3), harmony vocals (4, 5, 8), slide guitar (4), strumento de porco (pig's-head psaltery), mandocello and pan flute (8)
- Brian Bath – guitars (3)
- David Paton – bass guitar (1, 2, 4, 6, 9)
- Del Palmer – bass guitar (3, 8, 10)
- Stuart Elliott – drums (1, 2, 4, 6, 9, 10), percussion (1, 8, 9)
- Charlie Morgan – drums (3, 8)
- David Katz – orchestral contractor (for unnamed session orchestra: 9, 10)

Production

- Andrew Powell – producer
- Kate Bush – assistant producer
- Jon Kelly – recording engineer, mixing
- Patrick Jaunead – assistant engineer
- Nigel Walker – mixing assistant
- Gered Mankowitz – art direction, photography
- Richard Gray – sleeve design
- John Carder Bush – front cover concept

== Charts ==
Chart performance for Lionheart
| Chart (1978–79) | Peak position |
|---|---|
| Australian Albums (Kent Music Report) | 12 |
| Dutch Albums (Album Top 100) | 5 |
| Finnish Albums (Suomen virallinen lista) | 26 |
| German Albums (Offizielle Top 100) | 25 |
| Japanese Albums (Oricon) | 30 |
| New Zealand Albums (RMNZ) | 5 |
| Norwegian Albums (VG-lista) | 5 |
| Swedish Albums (Sverigetopplistan) | 16 |
| UK Albums (Official Charts) | 6 |

1984 chart performance for Lionheart
| Chart (1984) | Peak position |
|---|---|
| US Bubbling Under The Top LPs (Billboard) | 201 |

2014 chart performance for Lionheart
| Chart (2014) | Peak position |
|---|---|
| UK Albums (Official Charts) | 40 |

2024 chart performance for Lionheart
| Chart (2024) | Peak position |
|---|---|
| UK Independent Albums Chart | 48 |
| UK Record Store Chart | 8 |

=== Year-end charts ===
1979 year-end chart performance for Lionheart
| Chart (1979) | Position |
|---|---|
| UK Albums (OCC) | 47 |

== Certifications and sales ==
| Region | Certification | Certified units/sales |
|---|---|---|
| Australia (ARIA) | Platinum | 50,000^{^} |
| Canada (Music Canada) | Platinum | 100,000^{^} |
| Japan | — | 26,100 |
| Netherlands (NVPI) | Gold | 50,000^{^} |
| New Zealand (RMNZ) | Gold | 7,500^{^} |
| United Kingdom (BPI) | Platinum | 300,000^{^} |
| United States | — | 28,000 |
^{^} Shipments figures based on certification alone.
