= Strange Phenomena (song) =

Single by Kate Bush

from the album The Kick Inside
- B-side: "Wow"
- Released: 1 June 1979
- Recorded: 1977
- Studio: AIR Studios (London, England)
- Genre: Art rock
- Length: 3:00
- Label: EMI
- Songwriter: Kate Bush
- Producer: Andrew Powell

Kate Bush singles chronology
"Symphony in Blue" (1979)	"Strange Phenomena" (1979)	"Breathing" (1980)

"Strange Phenomena" is a song written and recorded by English musician Kate Bush. It was released as a single only in Brazil in June 1979, and was the fifth and final single from her debut album, The Kick Inside (1978).

"Strange Phenomena" speaks about déjà vu, synchronicity and how coincidences sometimes cluster together in seemingly meaningful ways. It has been described as "a frank paean to menstruation" by The Guardian.

This, and a number of other early Brazilian singles, were pressed at 33.3 rpm. Brazil is one of few countries that released singles at this speed, along with Argentina.

== Personnel ==
- Kate Bush – piano, lead vocals
- Andrew Powell – Fender Rhodes
- Duncan Mackay – synthesizer
- Ian Bairnson – electric guitar, acoustic guitar
- David Paton – bass guitar
- Stuart Elliott – drummer
- Morris Pert – percussion
