= Aerial (album) =

Studio album by Kate Bush
- Released: 7 November 2005
- Recorded: 1996–2005
- Studio: Abbey Road Studios (London)
- Genres: Art rock; progressive pop
- Length: 79:58
- Labels: EMI; Columbia (US)
- Producer: Kate Bush

Kate Bush chronology
Live at Hammersmith Odeon (1994)	Aerial (2005)	Director's Cut (2011)

Singles from Aerial
- 1. "King of the Mountain" Released: 24 October 2005

Aerial is the eighth album by English singer-songwriter and musician Kate Bush. It was released as a double album in 2005, twelve years after her 1993 album The Red Shoes. The album charted in twenty-two countries, peaking at number three in the UK.

== Overview ==
Aerial, Bush's first double album, was released after a twelve-year absence from the music industry during which Bush devoted her time to family and the raising of her son, Bertie. The anticipation leading up to the album's release was immense, with press articles devoted to Bush being printed months, even years before. Like Bush's previous album, The Red Shoes, Aerial does not feature a cover photograph of Bush, but rather one that is emblematic of the album's celebration of sky, sea, and birdsong. The cover image, which seems to show a mountain range at sunset reflected on the sea is in fact a waveform of a blackbird song superimposed over a glowing photograph.

Aerial is one of Bush's most critically acclaimed albums. Musically, the album is a multi-layered work, incorporating elements of folk, Renaissance, classical, reggae, flamenco, and rock. As with 1985's Hounds of Love, the album is divided into two thematically distinct collections. The first disc, subtitled A Sea of Honey, features a set of unrelated songs including the hit single "King of the Mountain", a Renaissance-style ode to her son Albert "Bertie" McIntosh performed with period instruments, and a song based on the story of Joan of Arc named "Joanni". In the song "$\pi$", Bush sings the number to its 78th decimal place, then from its 101st to its 137th decimal place. The piano and vocal piece "A Coral Room", dealing with the loss of Bush's mother and the passage of time, was hailed by critics as "stunning" in its simplicity, "profoundly moving" and as "one of the most beautiful" pieces Bush has ever recorded.

The second disc, subtitled A Sky of Honey, consists of a single piece of music reveling in the experience of outdoor adventures on a single summer day, beginning in the morning and ending twenty-four hours later with the next sunrise. The songs are saturated with the presence of birdsong, and all refer to the sky and sunlight, with the sea also featuring as an important element. Beginning with blackbirds singing in the dawn chorus, a woodpigeon cooing, solo piano, and Bush's son saying, "Mummy, Daddy, the day is full of birds," the piece begins with an early morning awakening to a beautiful day of sun shining "like the light in Italy"; it proceeds through a visit with a painter who is working on a new piece of pavement art ("An Architect's Dream" and "The Painter's Link") and then passes on to a crimson "Sunset". The interlude "Aerial Tal", consists of Bush imitating various samples of birdsong, while "Somewhere in Between" celebrates the ambiguous nature of dusk. "Nocturn", features a pair of lovers bathing in the sea after dark under a star-studded "diamond sky". The song cycle ends with "Aerial" and its euphoric welcome of the following morning's sunrise with the refrain "I need to be up on the roof...in the sun."

In the album's initial release, A Sky of Honey features Rolf Harris playing the didgeridoo and providing vocals on "An Architect's Dream" and "The Painter's Link". Following Harris' 2014 conviction for indecent assault, his vocals were replaced on the 2018 remaster with new recordings by Bertie McIntosh. Other guest artists include Peter Erskine, Eberhard Weber, Lol Creme and Procol Harum's Gary Brooker. In one of his final projects before his death in 2003, long-time Bush collaborator Michael Kamen arranged the string sections, performed by the London Metropolitan Orchestra.

In the 2014 series of concerts in London, Before the Dawn, Bush performed "King of the Mountain", "Joanni" and the whole Sky of Honey song cycle live for the first time.

== Reception ==
Professional ratings
Aggregate scores
Source	Rating
Metacritic	81/100
Review scores
Source	Rating
AllMusic	4/5 stars
Entertainment Weekly	A
The Guardian	5/5 stars
The Independent	5/5 stars
Mojo	5/5 stars
NME	7/10
Pitchfork	6.4/10
Q	4/5 stars
Rolling Stone	4/5 stars
The Times	4/5 stars

On 13 November 2005, Aerial entered the UK Albums Chart at number three, selling 91,473 copies in its first week on release. On 10 January 2006, Bush was nominated for two BRIT Awards for Best British Female Solo Artist and Best British Album for Aerial. On 27 January 2006, the album competed against Demon Days by Gorillaz and Coles Corner by Richard Hawley in the pop category of the South Bank Show's Annual Arts Awards, but was beaten by Hawley.

UK music magazine Mojo named it their third best album of 2005, behind I Am a Bird Now by Antony and the Johnsons and Funeral by Arcade Fire. Rob Chapman, writing in The Times, stated that "...its closing triptych, Somewhere in Between, Nocturn, and Aerial, represents the most joyous and euphoric finale to an album that you will hear all year." In Stylus Magazine, Marcello Carlin stated that "Aerial was a triumph, a towering dual masterpiece arriving like a huge galleon into the shallow pool of enforced worthiness and happiness which defined that era’s pop. It sought to give new life to dead souls—whether Elvis or her own mother or even the number Pi—and found that renewed life in young Bertie."

== Single ==
The only single from the album was "King of the Mountain". The song makes references to Elvis Presley and the film Citizen Kane. The track was played for the first time on BBC Radio 2 on 21 September 2005, and was made available for download on 27 September. The B-side (or second track) of the single was a Marvin Gaye cover, "Sexual Healing", recorded in 1994, and was not available on any of her albums until the release of the compilation The Other Sides in 2018. The single entered (and peaked in) the UK singles chart at number four, and gave Bush her first top-five hit in twenty years and her third-highest singles chart placing. The song also peaked at number six on the UK download chart.

== Re-releases ==
In mid-May 2010, Aerial was released for the first time on iTunes. The second disc, A Sky of Honey, plays as one track, and its title was changed to An Endless Sky of Honey. Each track title is merged altogether on the sleeve. In August 2010, the CD version was reissued by Sony Legacy in the United States. The following year Bush re-released Aerial and all her other studio albums on her own label Fish People, where they appeared again in 2018 in remastered form.

For the 2018 remastered edition, A Sky of Honey reverted to its original nine tracks. In light of the sexual assault conviction against Rolf Harris, his contributions to "An Architect's Dream" and "The Painter's Link" were removed and replaced with performances by Albert McIntosh, Bush's son.

== In popular culture ==
On 17 May 2015, a sequence from the song "π" was featured on The Simpsons' twenty-sixth-season finale, "Mathlete's Feat".

== Track listing ==
All tracks are written by Kate Bush.

Disc one – A Sea of Honey
No.	Title	Length
1.	"King of the Mountain"	4:53
2.	"π (Pi)"	6:09
3.	"Bertie"	4:18
4.	"Mrs. Bartolozzi"	5:58
5.	"How to Be Invisible"	5:32
6.	"Joanni"	4:56
7.	"A Coral Room"	6:12
Total length:		37:58

Disc two – A Sky of Honey
No.	Title	Length
8.	"Prelude"	1:26
9.	"Prologue"	5:42
10.	"An Architect's Dream"	4:50
11.	"The Painter's Link"	1:35
12.	"Sunset"	5:58
13.	"Aerial Tal"	1:01
14.	"Somewhere in Between"	5:00
15.	"Nocturn"	8:34
16.	"Aerial"	7:52
Total length:		42:00

Note: The 2010 CD reissue combines all parts of "A Sky of Honey" into one track lasting 42:00, with the title changed to "An Endless Sky of Honey".

== Personnel ==
- Kate Bush – vocals, keyboards (1–3, 5, 6, 8, 10, 13–16), piano (4, 7, 9, 12)
- Dan McIntosh – electric and acoustic guitar (1, 2, 5, 6, 10, 12, 14–16)
- Del Palmer – bass guitar (1, 5, 6, 14, 16)
- Paddy Bush – backing vocals (1)
- Steve Sanger – drums (1, 16)
- Stuart Elliott – drums (2, 5, 12, 14)
- Eberhard Weber – electric upright bass (2, 9)
- Lol Creme – backing vocals (2, 15)
- Eligio Quinteiro – renaissance guitar (3)
- Richard Campbell and Susanna Pell – viol (3)
- Bill Thorp – string arrangement (3)
- Robin Jeffrey – renaissance percussion (3)
- Chris Hall – accordion (5)
- Michael Wood – male vocal (7)
- Albert McIntosh – "The Sun" (8), "The Painter" (10, 11, on the 2018 edition)
- Peter Erskine – drums (9, 10, 15)
- London Metropolitan Orchestra strings (9, 11)
- Michael Kamen – orchestral arranger and conductor
- John Giblin – bass guitar (10, 12, 15)
- Rolf Harris – "The Painter" (10, 11 on the first release, only), didgeridoo (11)
- Gary Brooker – backing vocals (12, 14), hammond organ (14, 15)
- Bosco D'Oliveira – percussion (15, 16)

Production

- Del Palmer – recording and mixing engineer
- Simon Rhodes – engineer (Abbey Road Studios)
- Chris Bolster – assistant engineer (Abbey Road Studios)
- James Guthrie – mastering
- Joseph Southall – "Fishermen" painting

== Charts ==
=== Weekly charts ===
Weekly chart performance for Aerial
Chart (2005–2006)	Peak position
Australian Albums (ARIA)	25
Austrian Albums (Ö3 Austria)	23
Belgian Albums (Ultratop Flanders)	11
Belgian Albums (Ultratop Wallonia)	20
Canadian Album Charts (Nielsen BDS)	13
Czech Albums (ČNS IFPI)	26
Danish Albums (Hitlisten)	8
Dutch Albums (Album Top 100)	7
European Albums (Billboard)	2
Finnish Albums (Suomen virallinen lista)	2
French Albums (SNEP)	12
German Albums (Offizielle Top 100)	3
Greek Albums (IFPI)	31
Irish Albums (IRMA)	6
Italian Albums (FIMI)	9
Japanese Albums (Oricon)	53
New Zealand Albums (RMNZ)	22
Norwegian Albums (VG-lista)	4
Polish Albums (ZPAV)	3
Scottish Albums (Official Charts)	4
Swedish Albums (Sverigetopplistan)	7
Swiss Albums (Schweizer Hitparade)	12
UK Albums (Official Charts)	3
US Billboard 200	48
US Indie Store Album Sales (Billboard)	7

Weekly chart performance for Aerial
Chart (2014)	Peak position
UK Albums (Official Charts)	30

=== Year-end charts ===
2005 year-end chart performance for Aerial
Chart (2005)	Position
Belgian Albums (Ultratop Flanders)	95
Dutch Albums (Album Top 100)	67
French Albums (SNEP)	135
UK Albums (OCC)	63

2006 year-end chart performance for Aerial
Chart (2006)	Position
Dutch Albums (Album Top 100)	91
French Albums (SNEP)	200

== Certifications and sales ==
Certifications and sales for Aerial
Region	Certification	Certified units/sales
Canada (Music Canada)	Platinum	100,000^{^}
Finland (Musiikkituottajat)	Gold	23,811
France (SNEP)	Gold	100,000^{*}
Germany (BVMI)	Gold	100,000^{^}
Ireland (IRMA)	Gold	7,500^{^}
Japan	—	13,176
Poland (ZPAV)	Gold	20,000^{*}
United Kingdom (BPI)	Platinum	300,000^{^}
Summaries
Worldwide	—	1,100,000
^{*} Sales figures based on certification alone.^{^} Shipments figures based on certification alone.
