= Wow (Kate Bush song) =

Single by Kate Bush

from the album Lionheart
- B-side: "Fullhouse"
- Released: 9 March 1979
- Recorded: 1978
- Studio: Super Bear Studios (Berre-les-Alpes, France)
- Length: 3:41 (single edit); 4:00 (album version)
- Label: EMI
- Songwriter: Kate Bush
- Producers: Andrew Powell assisted by Kate Bush

Kate Bush singles chronology
"Hammer Horror" (1978)	"Wow" (1979)	"Symphony in Blue" (1979)

Music video
- "Wow" on YouTube

"Wow" is a song by the English musician Kate Bush. Originally released on her second album Lionheart in 1978, it was issued as the album's second single in March 1979. The single peaked at No. 14 and spent 10 weeks in the UK Singles Chart. It became a hit in other countries such as Ireland where it reached No.17. The Canadian single featured a unique sleeve and was pressed on transparent yellow vinyl. The song was a moderate hit on Canada's Adult Contemporary singles chart in RPM Magazine.

== Overview ==
Bush told her KBC fan club magazine in 1979 that she attempted to emulate the work of Pink Floyd when writing "Wow". She wrote "Wow" about the dichotomy of dubious practices in show business, including the swindling of cash from artists, and the allure of performing.

There are so many terrible things in the business that you hear about, like people trying to rip you off and actresses sleeping their way up to the top. But although maybe there is all of this stuff in the business, you can't destroy that magic. You can't get rid of that incredible rush and feeling that you get when you're up there on the stage.

Bush made a guest appearance on the TV Special ABBA in Switzerland, where she performed this song in April 1979. Around the time of this release, Bush embarked on her live concert tour. Due to this and the release of the single, Bush's second album Lionheart saw a resurgence of interest in the UK albums chart, by making a re-entry into the top 20 for several weeks.

"Wow" was a target for comedian Faith Brown who parodied it on her show. In 2012 The Guardian called "Wow" the "undisputed highlight" of the Lionheart album.

== Releases ==
In the United Kingdom, "Wow" was released as a single by EMI on 9 March 1979, with "Fullhouse" included as its B-side. The following week, it was among the most added songs to radio stations across the country.

The song appears on Bush's compilation hits album The Whole Story, released in 1986. For the video compilation of this album, a new video was made of "Wow", featuring a montage of Bush performing live in concert.

This song was featured in the 2002 Rockstar North video game Grand Theft Auto: Vice City as part of the power ballads radio station Emotion 98.3. However, it was not featured on the 10th anniversary edition re-release nor the Definitive Edition of the game.

== Music video ==
A video was filmed for the release; it features Bush performing the song in a darkened studio, and then backed by spotlights during the chorus.

The video for "Wow" was censored by the BBC because the song was considered risqué. The video shows Bush patting her bottom while singing "he's too busy hitting the Vaseline". Vaseline was once defined as a personal sexual lubricant.

== Track listing ==
All tracks written and composed by Kate Bush.

7-inch vinyl

1. "Wow" (edited version) – 3:46
2. "Fullhouse" – 3:13

== Personnel ==
Musicians

- Charlie Morgan – drums ("Wow")
- Stuart Elliot – drums ("Fullhouse")
- Brian Bath – guitar ("Wow")
- Del Palmer – bass ("Wow")
- David Paton – bass ("Fullhouse")
- Ian Bairnson – electric guitar
- Paddy Bush – mandolin ("Wow")
- Kate Bush – vocals, harmony vocals, piano
- Duncan Mackay – synthesizer ("Wow")
- Francis Monkman – Hammond organ ("Fullhouse")

Production

- Andrew Powell – producer
- Kate Bush – assistant producer
- Patrick Jaunead – assistant engineer
- David Katz – orchestra contractor
- Jon Kelly – recording engineer
- Nigel Walker – assistant engineer, mixing, mixing assistant

== Charts ==
Chart (1979)	Peak position
Canada Adult Contemporary (RPM)	28
Ireland (IRMA)	17
Quebec (ADISQ)	25
UK Singles (Official Charts)	14

== Cover versions ==
- Jazz singer Liza Lee covered the song on her 2009 album Anima. Lee donated proceeds of the album to the Society for Women's Health Research.
