= Hammer Horror (song) =

Single by Kate Bush

from the album Lionheart
- B-side: "Coffee Homeground"
- Released: 3 November 1978
- Recorded: July–September 1978
- Studio: Super Bear Studios (Berre-les-Alpes, France)
- Genre: Glam rock; art rock; baroque pop
- Length: 4:39; 4:25 (7 inch single edit)
- Label: EMI
- Songwriter: Kate Bush
- Producers: Andrew Powell assisted by Kate Bush

Kate Bush singles chronology
"The Man with the Child in His Eyes" (1978)	"Hammer Horror" (1978)	"Wow" (1979)

Music video
- "Hammer Horror" on YouTube

"Hammer Horror" is a song by Kate Bush, released as the first single from her second album Lionheart. It was released on 3 November 1978 with "Coffee Homeground" as the B-side. The single peaked at No. 44 and spent 6 weeks in the UK Singles Chart. The parent album, Lionheart, was released on 10 November 1978 reached No. 6 on the UK Albums Chart.

"Hammer Horror"s low chart position proved to be a temporary phenomenon, as Bush's next single returned her to the top 20. In other countries it fared better, including in Ireland and Australia, where the song reached No. 10 and No.17 respectively.

== Description ==
The song references Hammer Films, a company specializing in horror movies. However, Bush conceived of the song after viewing the film Man of a Thousand Faces, a biographical film – not produced by Hammer – about Lon Chaney starring James Cagney. "The song was inspired by seeing James Cagney playing the part of Lon Chaney playing the hunchback", Bush stated in 1979. "He was an actor in an actor in an actor, rather like Chinese boxes, and that's what I was trying to create." The theme of the song concerns an actor who is thrust into the lead role of The Hunchback of Notre-Dame after the original actor dies in an accident on the film set. The guilt-ridden narrator of the song is haunted by the ghost of the jealous original actor, who was a former friend. A promotional video was made for the single featuring Bush and a black-masked dancer performing the song against a black background.

The B-side of the song was "Coffee Homeground", also from Lionheart.

While in Australia during a promotional tour, Kate Bush devised the dance routine for the song in her Melbourne hotel room, and performed the song on the television show Countdown.

== Track listing ==
All tracks written and composed by Kate Bush.

7" vinyl

1. "Hammer Horror" – 4:38
2. "Coffee Homeground" – 3:39

7" vinyl (Japan)

1. "Hammer Horror" – 4:15
2. "Coffee Homeground" – 3:39

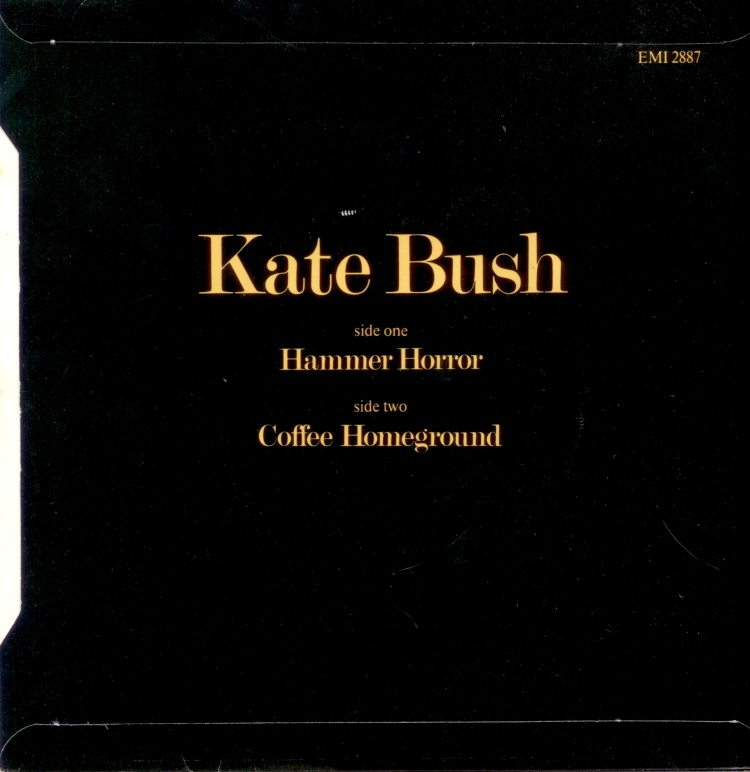
UK variant of standard back cover

== Personnel ==
Musicians

- Stuart Elliot – drums, percussion
- Del Palmer – bass ("Hammer Horror")
- David Paton – bass ("Coffee Homeground")
- Kate Bush – vocals, harmony vocals, piano
- Ian Bairnson – electric and acoustic guitar ("Hammer Horror"), rhythm guitar ("Coffee Homeground")
- Duncan Mackay – synthesizer
- Andrew Powell – harmonium ("Hammer Horror")

Production

- Andrew Powell – producer
- Kate Bush – assistant producer
- Patrick Jaunead – assistant engineer
- David Katz – orchestra contractor
- Jon Kelly – recording engineer
- Nigel Walker – assistant engineer, mixing, mixing assistant

== Charts ==
Chart (1978–79)	Peak position
Australia (Kent Music Report)	17
Ireland (IRMA)	10
Netherlands (Dutch Top 40)	25
Netherlands (Single Top 100)	25
New Zealand (Recorded Music NZ)	21
Spain (AFE)	35
UK Singles (OCC)	44
