= Taylor Dayne discography =

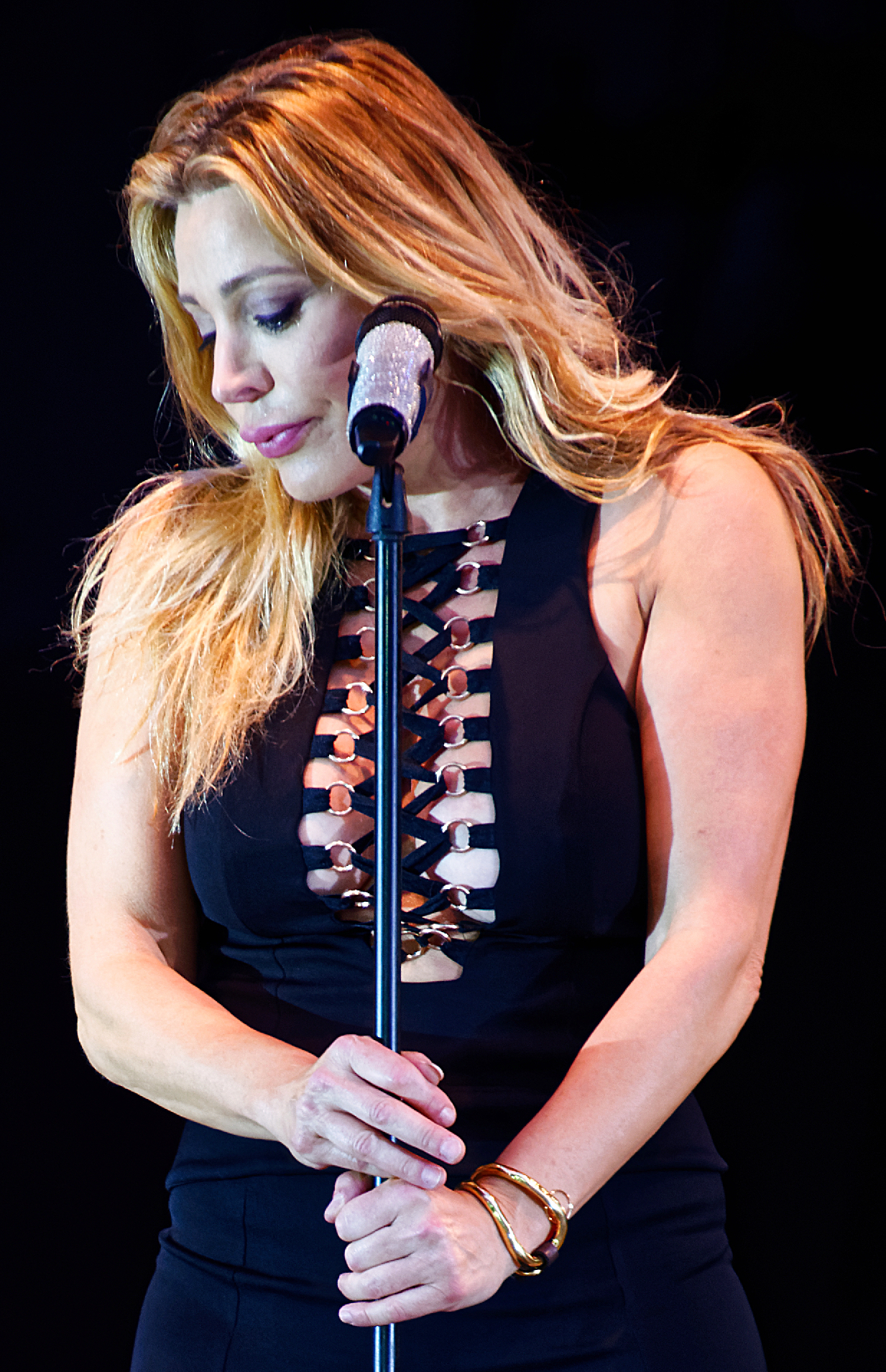
- Dayne performing in 2016
- Studio albums: 5
- Singles: 28
- Music videos: 14

This is the discography page for American singer Taylor Dayne.

== Albums ==
=== Studio albums ===
Title	Details	Peak chart positions										Certifications (sales thresholds)
Title	Details	US	AUS	AUT	CAN	GER	NED	NZ	SWE	SWI	UK	Certifications (sales thresholds)
Tell It to My Heart	Released: January 19, 1988; Label: Arista	21	53	19	47	11	27	37	15	4	24	US: 2× Platinum; CAN: Gold
Can't Fight Fate	Released: October 31, 1989; Label: Arista	25	7	—	23	—	—	24	30	24	—	US: 2× Platinum; AUS: 2× Platinum; CAN: Gold
Soul Dancing	Released: July 13, 1993; Label: Arista	51	2	39	31	70	33	—	31	31	—	US: Gold; AUS: Gold; CAN: Gold
Naked Without You	Released: October 6, 1998; Label: Neptune/River North/InsideBlu	—	—	—	—	—	—	—	—	—	—	
Satisfied	Released: February 5, 2008; Label: Adrenaline	179	—	—	—	—	—	—	—	—	—	
"—" denotes the album failed to chart or not released

=== Compilations ===
Title	Details	Peak chart positions	
Title	Details	AUS	UK
1995	Greatest Hits	76	104
1999	Performance	—	—
1999	Master Hits: Taylor Dayne	—	—
2002	The Best of Taylor Dayne	—	—
2003	Platinum & Gold Collection: Taylor Dayne	—	—
2005	Whatever You Want/Naked Without You	—	—
2005	Dance Diva: Remixes & Rarities	—	—
2006	Can't Get Enough of Your Love	—	—
2008	Super Hits	—	—
2013	Playlist: The Very Best of Taylor Dayne	—	—
"—" denotes the album failed to chart or not released

== Extended plays ==
Title	Details
The Capitol Sessions	Released April 24, 2024; Label: Dayne Media

== Singles ==
List of singles, with selected peak chart positions
Title	Year	Peak chart positions										Album
Title	Year	US	US Dance	AUS	CAN	GER	NED	NZ	SWE	SWI	UK	Album
"Tell It to My Heart"	1987	7	4	10	9	1	1	7	3	1	3	Tell It to My Heart
"Prove Your Love"	1988	7	1	30	19	4	8	32	10	2	8	Tell It to My Heart
"I'll Always Love You"	1988	3	—	86	11	38	85	43	—	30	41	Tell It to My Heart
"Don't Rush Me"	1988	2	6	73	4	33	—	50	—	—	76	Tell It to My Heart
"With Every Beat of My Heart"	1989	5	8	67	5	—	—	—	—	18	53	Can't Fight Fate
"Love Will Lead You Back"	1990	1	—	11	2	—	—	28	—	—	69	Can't Fight Fate
"I'll Be Your Shelter"	1990	4	—	4	1	—	—	33	—	—	43	Can't Fight Fate
"Heart of Stone"	1990	12	—	42	4	—	—	—	—	—	—	Can't Fight Fate
"Can't Get Enough of Your Love"	1993	20	2	2	8	56	9	25	34	17	14	Soul Dancing
"Send Me a Lover"	1993	50	—	42	22	—	—	—	—	—	—	Soul Dancing
"I'll Wait"	1994	103	3	133	—	—	—	—	—	—	29	Soul Dancing
"Original Sin"	1994	—	—	203	—	—	—	—	—	—	63	The Shadow (soundtrack)
"Say a Prayer"	1995	—	7	116	—	—	—	—	—	—	58	Soul Dancing & Greatest Hits
"Tell It to My Heart" (remix)	1996	—	10	—	—	—	—	—	—	—	23	Greatest Hits
"Whatever You Want"	1998	—	6	—	—	—	—	—	—	—	—	Naked Without You
"Naked Without You"	1998	—	3	—	—	—	—	—	—	—	—	Naked Without You
"Planet Love"	2000	—	1	—	—	—	—	—	—	—	—	Flawless (soundtrack)
"How Many"	2002	—	6	—	—	—	—	—	—	—	—	Circuit (soundtrack)
"Supermodel"	2003	—	—	—	—	—	—	—	—	—	—	The Lizzie McGuire Movie (soundtrack)
"I'm Not Featuring You"	2007	—	2	—	—	—	—	—	—	—	—	Non-album single
"Beautiful"	2007	—	1	—	—	—	—	—	—	—	—	Satisfied
"My Heart Can't Change"	2008	—	—	—	—	—	—	—	—	—	—	Satisfied
"Crash"	2008	—	—	—	—	—	—	—	—	—	—	Satisfied
"Facing a Miracle"	2010	—	—	—	—	—	—	—	—	—	—	Non-album singles
"Floor on Fire"	2011	—	7	—	—	—	—	—	—	—	—	Non-album singles
"Dreaming"	2014	—	—	—	—	—	—	—	—	—	—	Non-album singles
"Live Without"	2019	—	—	—	—	—	—	—	—	—	—	Non-album singles
"Please"	2020	—	—	—	—	—	—	—	—	—	—	Non-album singles
"Rockin' Around the Christmas Tree"	2021	—	—	—	—	—	—	—	—	—	—	Non-album singles
"Thinking Out Loud"	2023	—	—	—	—	—	—	—	—	—	—	The Capitol Sessions
"Lose You to Love Me"	2024	—	—	—	—	—	—	—	—	—	—	The Capitol Sessions
"—" denotes the single failed to chart or not released

== Music videos ==
Year	Video	Director
1987	"Tell It to My Heart"	Scott Kalvert/S. A. Baron
1988	"Prove Your Love"	Peter Lippman
1988	"I'll Always Love You"	Peter Israelson
1988	"Don't Rush Me"	David Hogan
1989	"With Every Beat of My Heart"	David Kellogg
1990	"Love Will Lead You Back"	Nigel Dick
1990	"I'll Be Your Shelter"	Dominic Sena
1990	"Heart of Stone"	Scott Kalvert
1993	"Can't Get Enough of Your Love"	Randee St. Nicholas
1993	"Send Me A Lover"	
1994	"I'll Wait"	
1994	"Original Sin"	Russell Mulcahy
1998	"Unstoppable"	
2008	"Beautiful"	Tony Duran
2014	"Dreaming"	

== Other album, soundtrack and compilation appearances ==
- Envy - Ain't It a Sin (1987) - Backing Vocals : Atco Records – 90605-1
- One Moment in Time: 1988 Summer Olympics Album (1988) - song: "Willpower"
- Fried Green Tomatoes soundtrack (1991) - song: "Danger, Heartbreak Dead Ahead"
- The Shadow soundtrack (1994) - song: "Original Sin"
- Saxtress Pamela Williams (1996) - song: "The Secret Garden"
- Searching For Jimi Hendrix (1999) - song: "The Wind Cries Mary"
- Flawless soundtrack (2000) - song: "Planet Love"
- Circuit soundtrack (2002) - song: "How Many"
- The Lizzie McGuire Movie soundtrack (2003) - song: "Supermodel"
- The Disco Ball live concert (2003) - performing "I Love the Nightlife (Disco 'Round)" and "Last Dance"
- Overtime Lee Ritenour (2005) - songs: "Papa Was a Rollin' Stone", "Is It You"
- Butch Queen RuPaul (2016) - song: "Be Someone"
- Still Kids New Kids on the Block (2024) - song: "Old School Love"
