= Greatest Hits (Taylor Dayne album) =

Greatest hits album by Taylor Dayne
- Released: November 14, 1995
- Recorded: 1987–1995
- Genre: Dance-pop; house
- Length: 57:00
- Label: Arista

Taylor Dayne chronology
Soul Dancing (1993)	Greatest Hits (1995)	Naked Without You (1998)

Singles from Greatest Hits
- 1. "Say a Prayer" Released: 1995

Professional ratings
Review scores
Source	Rating
AllMusic	4.5/5 stars
Q	2/5 stars

Greatest Hits is a compilation album by American singer-songwriter Taylor Dayne. It was released on November 14, 1995 by Arista Records. Following the disappointment of Dayne’s third studio album Soul Dancing (1993), Arista released Greatest Hits to finish out Taylor’s contract. It includes the hit singles "Love Will Lead You Back", "I'll Wait", "Tell It to My Heart", and her rendition of Barry White's "Can't Get Enough of Your Love". Since there was no new material recorded for the album, the record label decided to remix and release "Say a Prayer", a song from Soul Dancing. "Tell It to My Heart" was remixed and re-released also, and while neither managed to chart in the US, the latter single reached No. 23 in the UK Singles Chart.

== Track listings ==
No.	Title	Writer(s)	Original album	Length
1.	"Say a Prayer" (David Morales Remix)	Taylor Dayne; Shep Pettibone; Tony Shimkin	Soul Dancing (1993)	3:59
2.	"Tell It to My Heart" (LP Version)	Seth Swirsky; Ernie Gold	Tell It to My Heart (1988)	3:40
3.	"I'll Always Love You" (Single Version)	Jimmy George	Tell It to My Heart	4:20
4.	"Can't Get Enough of Your Love" (Barry White cover)	Barry White	Soul Dancing	4:26
5.	"With Every Beat of My Heart"	Arthur Baker; Lotti Golden; Tommy Faragher	Can't Fight Fate (1989)	4:25
6.	"Love Will Lead You Back" (Single Version)	Diane Warren	Can't Fight Fate	4:25
7.	"Don't Rush Me" (LP Version)	Alexandra Forbes; Jeff Franzel	Tell It to My Heart	3:50
8.	"Prove Your Love"	Seth Swirsky; Arnie Roman	Tell It to My Heart	3:27
9.	"I'll Be Your Shelter" (Single Version)	Diane Warren	Can't Fight Fate	4:08
10.	"Heart of Stone" (Single Version)	Elliot Wolff; Gregg Tripp	Can't Fight Fate	4:03
11.	"Send Me a Lover"	Richard Hahn; George Thatcher	Soul Dancing	4:30
12.	"I'll Wait" (E-Smoove Hot Mix)	Dayne; Pettibone; Shimkin	Soul Dancing	4:15
13.	"Tell It to My Heart" (T-empo Radio Mix)	Swirsky; Gold	Tell It to My Heart	3:47
14.	"Say a Prayer" (Vission Lorimer Mix)	Dayne; Pettibone; Shimkin	Soul Dancing	3:59

== Charts ==
Chart (1995)	Peak position
Australia (ARIA Charts)	76
United Kingdom (Official Charts Company)	104
