= Curt Bisquera =

American studio drummer

- Born: January 3, 1964 (age 61); Santa Maria
- Genres: Pop, rock
- Occupations: Studio and touring drummer
- Instrument: Drums
- Website: www.curtbisquera.com

Curt "Kirkee B." Bisquera is an American drummer known for his extensive work as a touring and session musician.

== Biography ==
Bisquera has worked with Johnny Cash, Josh Groban, Mick Jagger, Seal, Sarah McLachlan, Elton John, Johnny Hallyday and Tom Petty and the Heartbreakers, among others. He has stated that his greatest accomplishment was performing in Madison Square Garden with Elton John. He endorses Gretsch drums, Paiste cymbals, Drum Workshop Pedals & Hardware, Remo heads, and Vater drumsticks.

In 2012, Bisquera made an appearance on The Beach Boys' reunion album, That's Why God Made the Radio.

== Collaborations ==
With Josh Groban

- Josh Groban (143 Records, 2001)
- All That Echoes (Reprise Records, 2013)

With Terence Trent D'Arby

- Symphony or Damn (Columbia Records, 1993)

With Julieta Venegas

- Aquí (RCA International, 1997)
- Bueninvento (RCA International, 2000)

With Mick Jagger

- Wandering Spirit (Atlantic Records, 1993)

With Shelby Lynne

- Just a Little Lovin' (Lost Highway Records, 2008)

With Ronan Keating

- Fires (Polydor Records, 2012)

With Taylor Dayne

- Naked Without You (Neptune, 1998)
- Satisfied (Adrenaline, 2008)

With Céline Dion

- Falling into You (Columbia Records, 1996)

With Paula Abdul

- Spellbound (Virgin Records, 1991)

With Chris Isaak

- Speak of the Devil (Reprise Records, 1998)

With Melanie C

- Reason (Virgin Records, 2003)

With Beth Hart

- Bang Bang Boom Boom (Provogue Records, 2012)

With Elton John

- Duets (MCA, 1993)

With Bonnie Raitt

- Luck of the Draw (Capitol Records, 1991)

With Tony Joe White

- Lake Placid Blues (Polydor Records, 1995)

With Lulu

- Together (Mercury Records, 2002)

With Mike Love

- Unleash the Love (BMG, 2017)

With Nelly Furtado

- Whoa, Nelly! (Warner Bros. Records, 2000)

With Boz Scaggs

- Fade into Light (BVMP, 1996)
