= Soul Dancing =

Studio album by Taylor Dayne
- Released: July 13, 1993
- Recorded: 1992–1993
- Studio: Mastermix Studios, New York City, Trax Recording, Los Angeles, California, Ground Control, Santa Monica, California, The Hit Factory, NYC, Axis Studios, NYC, Skyline Studios, NYC & House of Sound Studios, NYC, Sound Works, NYC, Cove Sound Studios, Long Island, New York, Criterion Studios, Hollywood, California, & Tarpan Studios San Rafael, California
- Genre: Pop
- Length: 50:15
- Label: Arista
- Producer: Ric Wake; Shep Pettibone; Taylor Dayne; Humberto Gatica; Clivilles & Cole; Narada Michael Walden

Taylor Dayne chronology
Can't Fight Fate (1989)	Soul Dancing (1993)	Greatest Hits (1995)

Singles from Soul Dancing
- 1. "Can't Get Enough of Your Love" Released: May 17, 1993; 2. "Send Me a Lover" Released: September 6, 1993; 3. "I'll Wait" Released: February 28, 1994

Professional ratings
Review scores
Source	Rating
AllMusic	3/5 stars
Calgary Herald	C
Encyclopedia of Popular Music	2/5 stars
Entertainment Weekly	(favorable)
The Hamilton Spectator	(favorable)
Los Angeles Times	3/4 stars
Music Week	3/5 stars
The Washington Post	(favorable)

Soul Dancing is the third studio album by American singer-songwriter Taylor Dayne released on July 13, 1993, by Arista Records. This album peaked at No. 51 on the US Billboard 200. Soul Dancing was also certified Gold in the US by the RIAA.

== Background ==
The album includes the singles "Send Me a Lover", "I'll Wait", "Say a Prayer", and her rendition of Barry White's "Can't Get Enough of Your Love".

As well "I'll Wait" was featured in the 1994 Disney comedy feature film Blank Check.

== Critical reception ==
Dave Obee from Calgary Herald wrote, "Taylor Dayne is full of life, and as she sings she bites the heads off nails. She growls. Close your eyes, you can see her defiant strut. She even makes a Barry White song sound masculine." Greg Sandow from Entertainment Weekly called Soul Dancing a "killer pop album". He added, "Can’t fault her choice of material; these are crisp, focused, hook-filled pop songs, every one of them a likely radio hit."

Connie Johnson of the Los Angeles Times remarked "On this 11-song collection, Dayne's exaggerated enunciation and overblown, diva-style soulfulness have never been put to finer use". Leonard Pitts Jr. of the Miami Herald wrote, "Soul Dancing is the one thing that few records are these days: solid. Solid vocalist. Solid songs. Solid production...Skip the hype. Taylor Dayne makes crisp, tuneful pop. Perfect summertime ear candy. And really, now, what more do you need?"

== Track listing ==
Original release
No.	Title	Writer(s)	Length
1.	"I'll Wait"	Taylor Dayne; Shep Pettibone; Tony Shimkin	4:43
2.	"Send Me a Lover"	Rick Hahn; George Thatcher	4:28
3.	"Can't Get Enough of Your Love"	Barry White	4:25
4.	"Say a Prayer"	Taylor Dayne; Shep Pettibone; Tony Shimkin	5:23
5.	"Dance with a Stranger"	Mark S. Cawley	4:28
6.	"I Could Be Good for You"	Diane Warren	4:26
7.	"Soul Dancing"	Taylor Dayne; Shep Pettibone; Tony Shimkin	4:34
8.	"The Door to Your Heart" (duet with Keith Washington)	Warren	4:10
9.	"Someone Like You"	Taylor Dayne; Lotti Golden; Tommy Faragher	3:50
10.	"Memories"	Taylor Dayne; Lotti Golden; Tommy Faragher	4:47
11.	"If You Were Mine"	Taylor Dayne; Narada Michael Walden; Jeffrey E. Cohen	5:01
Total length:			50:15

European and Japan bonus track
No.	Title	Writer(s)	Length
12.	"Let's Spend the Night Together"	Taylor Dayne; Narada Michael Walden; Jeffrey E. Cohen	5:35
Total length:			55:50

Disc 1 (2014 remastered edition)
No.	Title	Writer(s)	Length
1.	"I'll Wait"	Taylor Dayne; Shep Pettibone; Tony Shimkin	4:44
2.	"Send Me a Lover"	Rick Hahn; George Thatcher	4:28
3.	"Can't Get Enough of Your Love"	Barry White	4:26
4.	"Say a Prayer"	Taylor Dayne; Shep Pettibone; Tony Shimkin	5:23
5.	"Dance with a Stranger"	Mark S. Cawley	4:29
6.	"I Could Be Good for You"	Diane Warren	4:26
7.	"Soul Dancing"	Taylor Dayne; Shep Pettibone; Tony Shimkin	4:35
8.	"The Door to Your Heart" (duet with Keith Washington)	Diane Warren	4:11
9.	"Someone Like You"	Taylor Dayne; Lotti Golden; Tommy Faragher	3:50
10.	"Memories"	Taylor Dayne; Lotti Golden; Tommy Faragher	4:45
11.	"If You Were Mine"	Taylor Dayne; Narada Michael Walden; Jeffrey E. Cohen	5:01
12.	"Let's Spend The Night Together"	Taylor Dayne; Narada Michael Walden; Jeffrey E. Cohen	5:35
13.	"Original Sin" (Theme From The Shadow – Radio Mix)	Jim Steinman	5:53
14.	"I'll Wait" (Hot Mix)	Taylor Dayne; Shep Pettibone; Tony Shimkin	4:16
15.	"Say a Prayer" (Boss Edit)	Taylor Dayne; Shep Pettibone; Tony Shimkin	4:00
16.	"Tell It to My Heart" (T-empo Radio Edit)	Seth Swirsky; Ernie Gold	3:49
17.	"I'll Wait" (4 Minutes Of Soul)	Taylor Dayne; Shep Pettibone; Tony Shimkin	4:20
Total length:			78:11

Disc 2 (2014 remastered edition)
No.	Title	Writer(s)	Length
1.	"Can't Get Enough of Your Love" (C+C Special Edition Mix)	Barry White	6:15
2.	"I'll Wait" (E-Smoove Vocal Remix)	Taylor Dayne; Shep Pettibone; Tony Shimkin	7:00
3.	"Say a Prayer" (Boss Club Mix)	Taylor Dayne; Shep Pettibone; Tony Shimkin	7:49
4.	"Tell It to My Heart" (T-empo Extended Mix)	Seth Swirsky; Ernie Gold	8:49
5.	"I'll Wait" (7 Minutes Of Silk)	Taylor Dayne; Shep Pettibone; Tony Shimkin	7:24
6.	"Can't Get Enough of Your Love" (C+C Bass Dub)	Barry White	4:59
7.	"Say a Prayer" (Mass Dub)	Taylor Dayne; Shep Pettibone; Tony Shimkin	6:43
8.	"Tell It to My Heart" (T-empo Blue Room Dub)	Seth Swirsky; Ernie Gold	7:14
9.	"I'll Wait" (Silky Dub Total)	Taylor Dayne; Shep Pettibone; Tony Shimkin	5:50
10.	"Say a Prayer" (Vission Lorimer Remix)	Taylor Dayne; Shep Pettibone; Tony Shimkin	6:29
11.	"Tell It to My Heart" (Tony De Vit Club Mix)	Seth Swirsky; Ernie Gold	7:57
Total length:			76:29

== Personnel ==
- Taylor Dayne – lead vocals, backing vocals (5, 10)
- Shep Pettibone – keyboards (1, 4, 7), programming (1, 4, 7), sequencing (1, 4, 7)
- Tony Shimkin – keyboards (1, 4, 7, programming (1, 4, 7), sequencing (1, 4, 7)
- David Foster – acoustic piano (2)
- David Cole – keyboards (3), arrangements (3)
- James Alfano – programming (3)
- Ricky Crespo – programming (3)
- Rich Tancredi – keyboards (5, 6, 8, 9), arrangements (5, 6, 8)
- Peter Schwartz – additional keyboards (7), additional programming (7)
- Tommy Faragher – keyboards (9, 10), arrangements (9, 10)
- Louis Biancaniello – keyboards (11, 12), programming (11, 12)
- Narada Michael Walden – programming (11, 12), drums (11, 12)
- Booker T. Jones – Hammond B3 organ (12)
- Michael Landau – guitars (2)
- Chuck Loeb – guitars (3)
- Al Pitrelli – guitars (5, 6)
- Bob Cadway – guitars (8, 10)
- Vernon "Ice" Black – guitars (12)
- Neil Stubenhaus – bass (2)
- T.M. Stevens – bass (5, 6)
- Robert Clivillés – drums (3), percussion (3), arrangements (3)
- Joe Franco – drums (5, 6, 8, 10)
- Richie Jones – drum programming (9)
- Bashiri Johnson – percussion (3)
- Andrew Jerome "Babe" Pace – hi-hat (3)
- Richie Cannata – saxophone (5)
- Charlie DeChant – saxophone (6)
- Mark Russo – sax solo (11)
- Claude Gaudette – arrangements (2)
- Ric Wake – arrangements (5, 6, 8, 9, 10)
- Warren Wiebe – backing vocals (2)
- Paulette McWilliams – backing vocals (3)
- Cindy Mizelle – backing vocals (3)
- Audrey Wheeler – backing vocals (3)
- Tony Harnell – backing vocals (5, 6)
- Joe Lynn Turner – backing vocals (5, 6)
- Joe Turano – backing vocals (6)
- Karen Anderson – backing vocals (7)
- Monique Sorel – backing vocals (7)
- Kenny Bobien – backing vocals (9)
- Eddie Stockley – backing vocals (9)
- Lotti Golden – backing vocals (10)
- Kitty Beethoven – backing vocals (11)
- Nikita Germaine – backing vocals (11, 12)
- Skyler Jett – backing vocals (11)
- Tony Lindsay – backing vocals (11, 12)
- Jeanie Tracy – backing vocals (11)
- Sandy Griffith – backing vocals (12)
- Claytoven Richardson – backing vocals (12)
- Kimaya Seward – backing vocals (12)
- Monty Seward – backing vocals (12)

== Production ==
- Clive Davis – executive producer
- Shep Pettibone – producer (1, 4, 7), recording (1), mixing (1)
- Taylor Dayne – co-producer (1)
- Humberto Gatica – producer (2), engineer (2), mixing (2)
- David Cole – producer (3)
- Robert Clivillés – producer (3)
- Ric Wake – producer (5, 6, 8, 9, 10)
- Narada Michael Walden – producer (11, 12)
- Louis Biancaniello – associate producer (11)
- Tony Shimkin – engineer (1), mixing (1)
- Alex Rodriguez – engineer (2)
- Acar S. Key – engineer (3)
- P. Dennis Mitchell – recording (4, 7)
- Bob Cadway – track engineer (5, 6, 8, 9, 10), mixing (5, 6, 8, 9, 10)
- Guy Roche – BGV recording (6)
- Goh Hotoda – engineer (7), mixing (7)
- Marc "Elvis" Reyburn – engineer (11, 12)
- David Frazer – vocal recording and mixing (11, 12)
- Claude Gaudette – mixing (2)
- Bob Rosa – mixing (3)
- Jim "Bonzai" Caruso – mixing (4)
- Rick Bieder – additional engineer (5, 6, 8, 9, 10)
- Dan Hetzel – additional engineer (5, 6, 8, 9, 10)
- Thomas R. Yezzi – additional engineer (6, 8)
- Matt Rohr – additional engineer (12)
- Felipe Elgueta – assistant engineer (2)
- Mario Luccy – BGV recording assistant (6)
- Jeff Gray – assistant engineer (11, 12)
- Tony DeFranco – coordinator (2)
- David Barratt – production coordinator (5, 6, 8, 9, 10)
- Greg Bannan – production coordinator (track 5, 6, 8, 9, 10)
- Janice Lee – production coordinator (11, 12)
- Cynthia Shiloh – production coordinator (11, 12)
- Kevin Walden – production coordinator (11, 12)
- Susan Mendola – art direction, design
- Randee St. Nicholas – photography (Visages Style, L.A.
- Stephen Earabino – styling (Visages Style, L.A.)
- Billy B. – make-up (Stephen Knoll Salon)
- Tony Lucha – hair (Vartoli Salon, N.Y.)
- Frank Dileo at DiLeo Entertainment – management

== Charts ==
=== Weekly charts ===
Chart (1993)	Peak position
Australian Albums (ARIA)	2
Canadian Albums (RPM)	31
Swedish Albums (Sverigetopplistan)	31
Swiss Albums (Schweizer Hitparade)	31
Dutch Albums (Album Top 100)	33
US Billboard 200	51

== Certifications ==
Region	Certification	Certified units/sales
Australia (ARIA)	Gold	35,000^{^}
Canada (Music Canada)	Gold	50,000^{^}
United States (RIAA)	Gold	500,000^{^}
^{^} Shipments figures based on certification alone.
