= List of Hot Adult Contemporary number ones of 1990 =

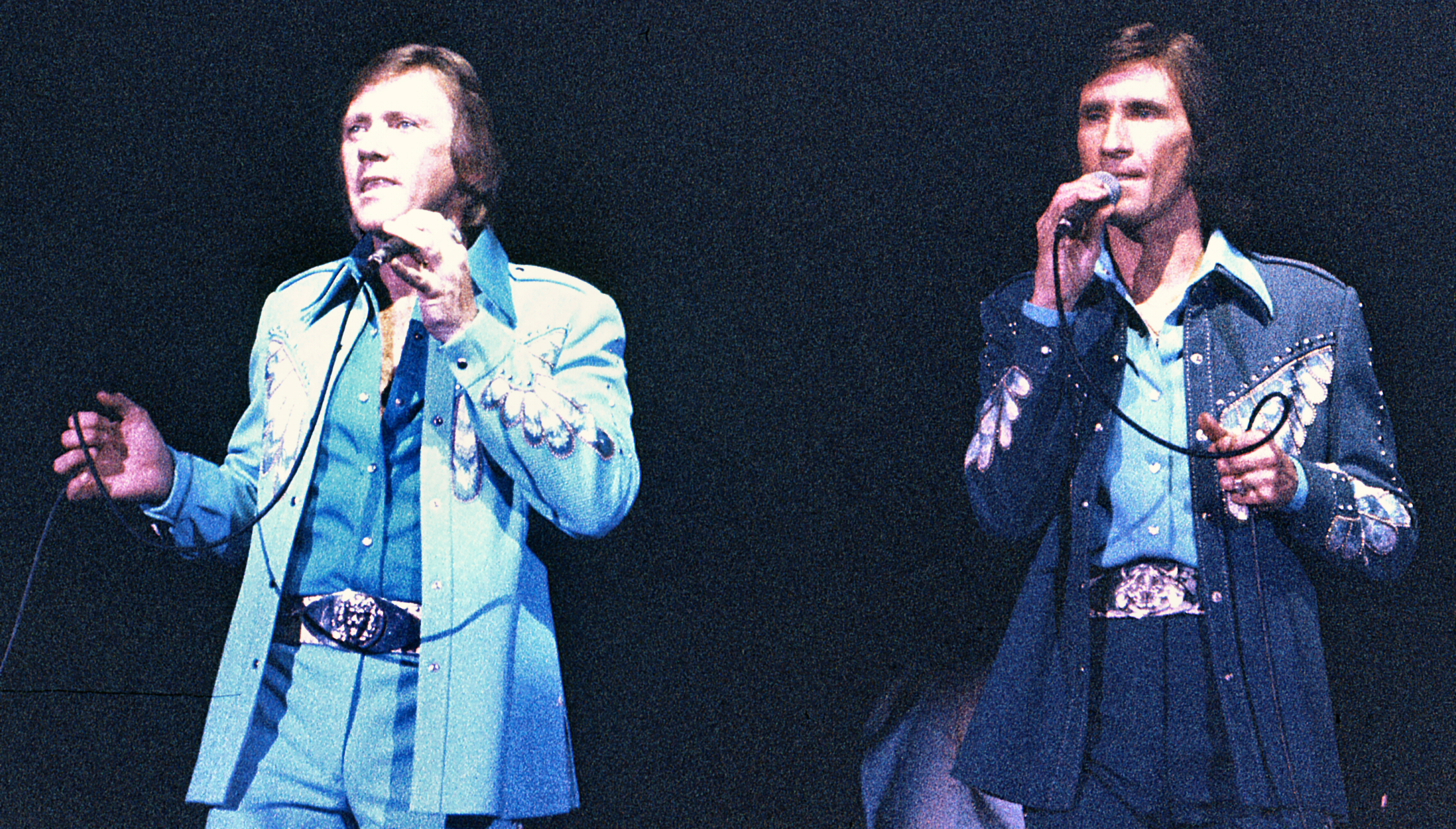
The Righteous Brothers topped the chart with their 1965 recording of "Unchained Melody", which was re-released after being featured in the film Ghost.

In 1990, Billboard magazine published a chart ranking the top-performing songs in the United States in the adult contemporary music (AC) market. The chart, which in 1990 was published under the title Hot Adult Contemporary, has undergone various name changes during its history but has been published as Adult Contemporary since 1996. In 1990, 18 songs topped the chart based on playlists submitted by radio stations.

In the issue of Billboard dated January 6, Michael Bolton was at number one with "How Am I Supposed to Live Without You", which retained the top spot from the final chart of 1989.^{[a]} Bolton's song held the top spot for one further week before being replaced by Rod Stewart's recording of the Tom Waits song "Downtown Train". Stewart was one of five acts to achieve two number ones during the year, as he returned to the top of the chart in April with "This Old Heart of Mine". The song featured additional vocals by Ronald Isley, whose group the Isley Brothers had recorded the original version of the song in the mid-1960s. Bolton, Mariah Carey, Gloria Estefan and Wilson Phillips also took two songs to number one during the year. Estefan and Stewart each spent a total of six weeks atop the chart, tying for the most weeks spent at number one during the year with Bette Midler, who spent six consecutive weeks in the top spot with "From a Distance", the year's longest unbroken run at number one.

In the second half of the year, Carey achieved the feat of taking her first two singles not only to the top of the Hot Adult Contemporary chart but also to number one on Billboard's pop singles listing, the Hot 100, beginning a recording career that would ultimately make her one of the biggest-selling female performers of all time. She would achieve six AC number ones in the first half of the 1990s, before her music began to move in a more heavily R&B and hip hop-influenced direction. In October, the Righteous Brothers reached number one with their 1965 recording of the song "Unchained Melody", which was re-released after it was prominently featured in the film Ghost. Following the song's appearance on the film's soundtrack, the duo recorded a new version of the song, and both recordings entered the Hot 100, but it was the original rendition that gained sufficient airplay on adult contemporary radio to enter and ultimately top the AC chart. The year's final number one was also taken from a film soundtrack; "You Gotta Love Someone" by Elton John, which spent the last three weeks of 1990 at number one, appeared in the film Days of Thunder.

== Chart history ==
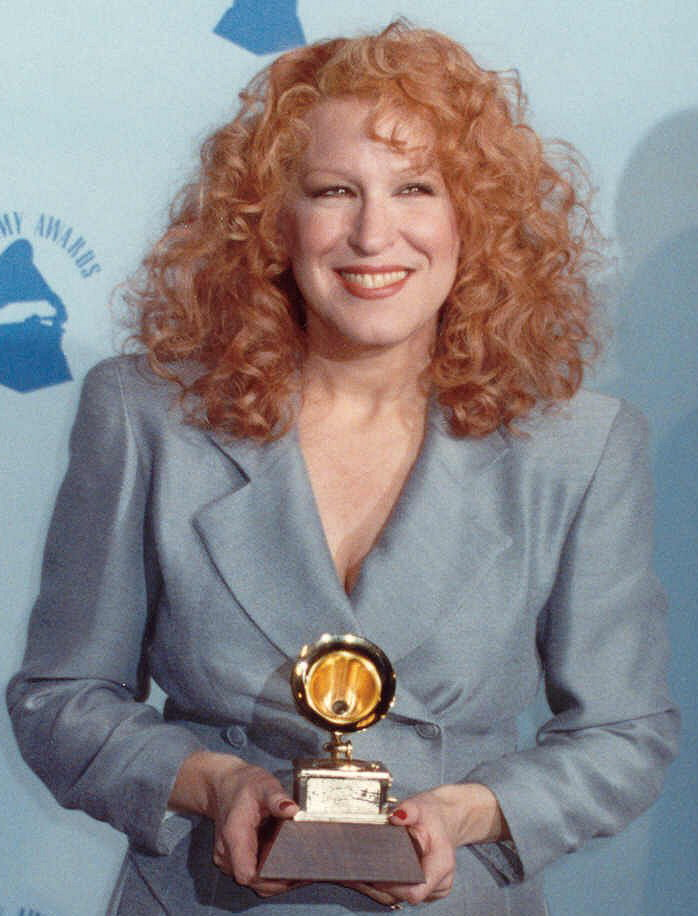
Bette Midler had the year's longest-running number one with "From a Distance".

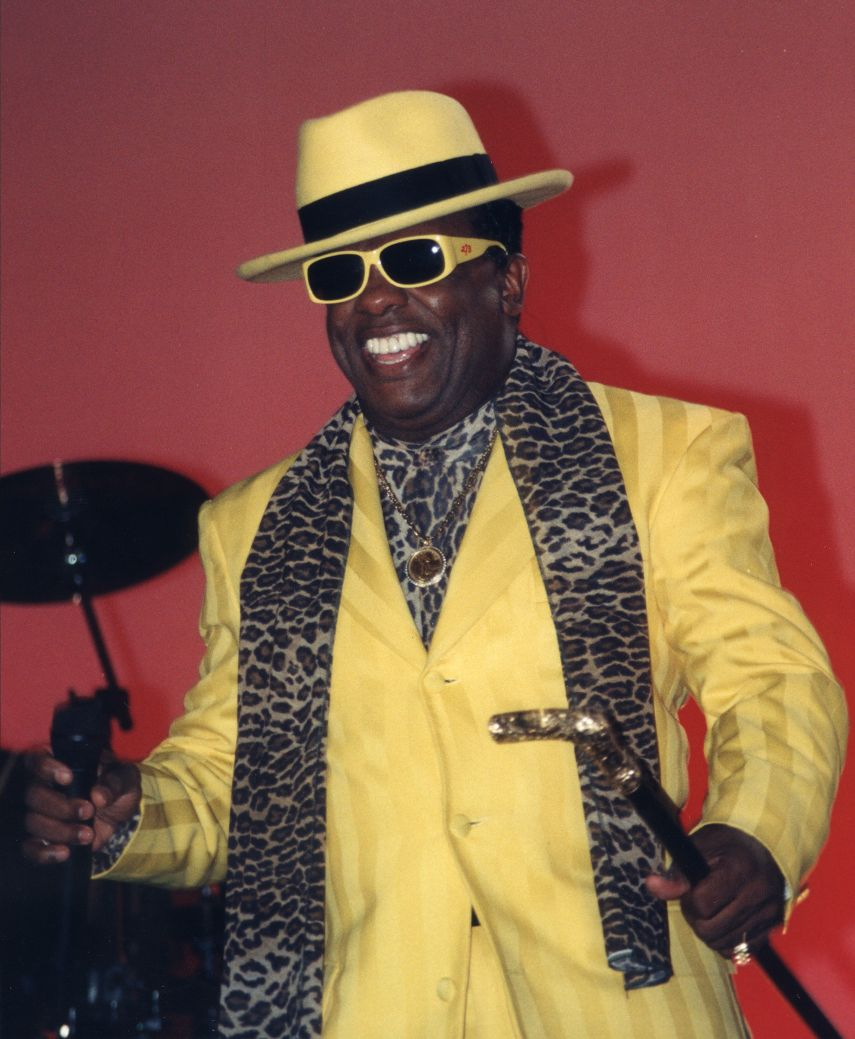
Ronald Isley guested on Rod Stewart's recording of "This Old Heart of Mine", originally recorded by the Isley Brothers.

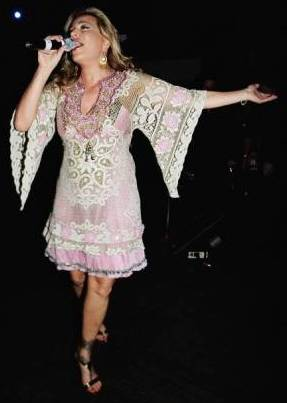
"Love Will Lead You Back" was a chart-topper for Taylor Dayne.

Chart history
Issue date	Title	Artist(s)	Ref.
January 6	"How Am I Supposed to Live Without You"	Michael Bolton	
January 13	"How Am I Supposed to Live Without You"	Michael Bolton	
January 20	"Downtown Train"	Rod Stewart	
January 27	"Here We Are"	Gloria Estefan	
February 3	"Here We Are"	Gloria Estefan	
February 10	"Here We Are"	Gloria Estefan	
February 17	"Here We Are"	Gloria Estefan	
February 24	"Here We Are"	Gloria Estefan	
March 3	"All My Life"	Linda Ronstadt featuring Aaron Neville	
March 10	"All My Life"	Linda Ronstadt featuring Aaron Neville	
March 17	"All My Life"	Linda Ronstadt featuring Aaron Neville	
March 24	"Love Will Lead You Back"	Taylor Dayne	
March 31	"Love Will Lead You Back"	Taylor Dayne	
April 7	"Love Will Lead You Back"	Taylor Dayne	
April 14	"Love Will Lead You Back"	Taylor Dayne	
April 21	"This Old Heart of Mine"	Rod Stewart featuring Ronald Isley	
April 28	"This Old Heart of Mine"	Rod Stewart featuring Ronald Isley	
May 5	"This Old Heart of Mine"	Rod Stewart featuring Ronald Isley	
May 12	"This Old Heart of Mine"	Rod Stewart featuring Ronald Isley	
May 19	"This Old Heart of Mine"	Rod Stewart featuring Ronald Isley	
May 26	"Hold On"	Wilson Phillips	
June 2	"Do You Remember?"	Phil Collins	
June 9	"Do You Remember?"	Phil Collins	
June 16	"Do You Remember?"	Phil Collins	
June 23	"Do You Remember?"	Phil Collins	
June 30	"Do You Remember?"	Phil Collins	
July 7	"When I'm Back on My Feet Again"	Michael Bolton	
July 14	"When I'm Back on My Feet Again"	Michael Bolton	
July 21	"When I'm Back on My Feet Again"	Michael Bolton	
July 28	"Cuts Both Ways"	Gloria Estefan	
August 4	"Vision of Love"	Mariah Carey	
August 11	"Vision of Love"	Mariah Carey	
August 18	"Vision of Love"	Mariah Carey	
August 25	"Come Back to Me"	Janet Jackson	
September 1	"Come Back to Me"	Janet Jackson	
September 8	"Come Back to Me"	Janet Jackson	
September 15	"Release Me"	Wilson Phillips	
September 22	"Oh Girl"	Paul Young	
September 29	"Oh Girl"	Paul Young	
October 6	"Oh Girl"	Paul Young	
October 13	"Unchained Melody"	The Righteous Brothers	
October 20	"Unchained Melody"	The Righteous Brothers	
October 27	"Love Takes Time"	Mariah Carey	
November 3	"From a Distance"	Bette Midler	
November 10	"From a Distance"	Bette Midler	
November 17	"From a Distance"	Bette Midler	
November 24	"From a Distance"	Bette Midler	
December 1	"From a Distance"	Bette Midler	
December 8	"From a Distance"	Bette Midler	
December 15	"You Gotta Love Someone"	Elton John	
December 22	"You Gotta Love Someone"	Elton John	
December 29	"You Gotta Love Someone"	Elton John	

=== Notes ===
a. Due to the holiday period, Billboard did not publish an issue dated December 30, 1989. The issue dated January 6, 1990, showed the "last week" position of every song in the Hot Adult Contemporary chart as identical to the chart dated December 23, placing "Another Day in Paradise" by Phil Collins at number one for a further week. Billboard has since published a revised chart dated December 30 on their website showing "How Am I Supposed to Live Without You" at number one.

== See also ==
- 1990 in music
- List of artists who reached number one on the U.S. Adult Contemporary chart
