= Send Me a Lover =

1993 single by Taylor Dayne

Single by Taylor Dayne

from the album Soul Dancing
- Released: September 6, 1993
- Genre: Pop
- Length: 4:28
- Label: Arista
- Songwriters: Richard Hahn; George Thatcher
- Producer: Humberto Gatica

Taylor Dayne singles chronology
"Can't Get Enough of Your Love" (1993)	"Send Me a Lover" (1993)	"I'll Wait" (1994)

Music video
- "Send Me a Lover" on YouTube

Send Me a Lover is a song by American singer Taylor Dayne. Written by Rick Hahn and George Thatcher, it was released on September 6, 1993, by Arista Records as the second single from Dayne's third studio album, Soul Dancing (1993). The ballad reached number 50 on the Billboard Hot 100, number 44 on the Cash Box Top 100, and number 19 on the Hot Adult Contemporary Tracks chart. In Canada, it peaked at number 24 on the RPM 100 Hit Tracks chart and number eight on the RPM Adult Contemporary Tracks chart. The music video, directed by Randee St. Nicholas, was filmed in New York City.

== Critical reception ==
Jose F. Promis of AllMusic described the song as "one of Dayne's finest moments". Larry Flick of Billboard called it "a heartbroken power ballad that will connect with anyone who has suffered from unrequited love", praising its production and Dayne's vocal performance. Mike Joyce of The Washington Post wrote that ballads such as "Send Me a Lover", "with stirring choruses, modulations, and melismatic twists", show Dayne's command of the style.

== Formats and track listing ==
US CD maxi-single

1. "Send Me a Lover" – 4:28
2. "With Every Beat of My Heart" – 4:22
3. "Love Will Lead You Back" – 4:37
4. "If You Were Mine" – 5:01
5. "Someone Like You" – 3:50

== Charts ==
Chart performance
Chart (1993)	Peak position
Australia (ARIA)	42
Canada Top Singles (RPM)	24
Canada Adult Contemporary (RPM)	8
Iceland (Íslenski Listinn Topp 40)	19
Netherlands (Single Top 100 Tip)	15
US Billboard Hot 100	50
US Adult Contemporary (Billboard)	19
US Cash Box Top 100	44

== Release history ==
Release history
Region	Date	Format	Label	Ref.
United States	September 6, 1993	7-inch vinyl; cassette; CD	Arista	
Japan	October 21, 1993	3-inch CD	Arista	

== Celine Dion version ==
"Send Me a Lover"

Song by Celine Dion

from the album Kumbaya Album 1994
- Released: 1994
- Genre: Pop
- Length: 4:31
- Label: Sony
- Songwriters: Richard Hahn; George Thatcher
- Producer: Humberto Gatica

Canadian singer Celine Dion recorded "Send Me a Lover" during the sessions for her self-titled album, Celine Dion. Her version was produced by Humberto Gatica.

=== Background and release ===
Dion's recording, which includes revised verses and slightly altered chorus lyrics, was contributed to several benefit compilations supporting women's health and social causes. It first appeared on the Kumbaya Album 1994 in Canada. Proceeds from the album supported people living with HIV/AIDS.

The track was later included on In Between Dances (1995), which raised funds for breast cancer research; The Power of Peace (1996), released to mark the 50th anniversary of CARE; and Women for Women, Vol. 2 (1996), another breast cancer research fundraiser. Although never issued as a commercial single, "Send Me a Lover" received adult contemporary radio airplay beginning in September 1996, primarily as an album track from The Power of Peace.

=== Commercial performance ===
"Send Me a Lover" entered the US Radio & Records Adult Contemporary chart in November 1996 and reached number 16 in January 1997. It also entered the Billboard Adult Contemporary chart in January 1997, peaking at number 23.

=== Critical reception ===
Larry Flick of Billboard wrote: "Here's a wonderful song that Dion has contributed to The Power of Peace, a fine 13-track compilation designed to raise money for CARE. Sharp ears will remember Taylor Dayne's hit version of this forlorn power ballad, which Dion dives into with white-knuckled power. AC listeners who cannot get enough of the Canadian diva will feast on this treat".

=== Charts ===
==== Weekly charts ====
Weekly chart performance
Chart (1996–1997)	Peak position
US Adult Contemporary (Billboard)	23
US Adult Contemporary (Radio & Records)	16

==== Year-end charts ====
Year-end chart performance
Chart (1997)	Position
US Adult Contemporary (Radio & Records)	78
