= Naked Without You (album) =

Studio album by Taylor Dayne
- Released: October 6, 1998
- Recorded: 1997–1998
- Genre: Pop
- Labels: Neptune; River North; InsideBlu
- Producers: Jez Colin; Taylor Dayne; Tom Keane; Ernie Lake; Robbie Nevil; Charlton Pettus; Carmen Rizzo; Tommy Sims

Taylor Dayne chronology
Greatest Hits (1995)	Naked Without You (1998)	Satisfied (2008)

Singles from Naked Without You
- 1. "Whatever You Want" Released: September 1, 1998; 2. "Unstoppable" Released: 1998; 3. "Naked Without You" Released: 1999

Professional ratings
Review scores
Source	Rating
AllMusic	3.5/5 stars

Naked Without You is the fourth studio album by American singer-songwriter Taylor Dayne, released on October 6, 1998. The album includes three singles; "Whatever You Want" (co-written by Dayne and originally recorded and released as a single by Tina Turner in 1996), "Unstoppable" and the title track "Naked Without You".

== Background ==
Naked Without You was Dayne's first new studio album in five years and followed a period when she focused on her new acting career. In 1997, she began recording a new album and subsequently formed her own record company, Neptune Records. Together with the independent label River North Records, Naked Without You was released in 1998. She told The Dothan Eagle in 1998: "What I'm doing right now is trying to fill in the gap for the past four or five years. That's why I moved out [to Los Angeles] and started my own label. I'm looking at this more as a business sense of expanding creatively. I produced and co-produced the entire album. This is my child." She added to The Press of Atlantic City: "It's been an album in the making for two-and-a-half years. It's kind of come together like a peeling onion. The songs come together and they're more expressive as to where I am now. I tried to strip away a lot of the slickness that's associated with my sound. I certainly think it reflects my musical taste, and it's much more progressive."

For the album, Dayne chose to record her own version of "Whatever You Want", which was co-written by Dayne and originally recorded and released by Tina Turner in 1996. Dayne said of her version: "I knew it would be a slamming club mix, and I put it out there to get a buzz going."

== Track listing ==
1. "Don't Make Me Love You" (Andrew Roachford) – (4:10)
2. "Whenever You Fall" (Taylor Dayne, Robert P. Graziose, Ernie Lake, Janice Robinson) – (4:49)
3. "Unstoppable" (T. Dayne, Arnie Roman) – (4:07)
4. "Naked Without You" (Rick Nowels, A. Roachford, Billy Steinberg) – (3:52)
5. "Whatever You Want" (Arthur Baker, T. Dayne, Fred Zarr) – (4:50)
6. "Stand" (Henry Hey, Stephanie Saraco) – (4:26)
7. "You Don't Have to Say You Love Me" (Simon Napier-Bell, Giuseppe Donaggio, Vito Pallavicini, Vicki Wickham) – (4:09)
8. "Love's Gonna Be On Your Side" (T. Dayne, Robbie Nevil) – (4:27)
9. "Dreams" (T. Dayne, Tom Keane) – (4:00)
10. "There Is No Heart That Won't Heal" (Diane Warren) – (5:17)
11. "Soon As My Heart Breaks" (T. Dayne, Billy Mann) – (3:12)
12. "Whatever You Want" (Remix) (A. Baker, T. Dayne, Fred Zarr) – (4:41)

== Expanded Edition ==
In 2005, Naked Without You was re-released with three extra tracks recorded from the live sessions in 1999/2000

1. "Don't Make Me Love You" (A. Roachford) – (4:10)
2. "Whenever You Fall" (T. Dayne, B.G. Grazoise, E. Lake, J. Robinson) – (4:49)
3. "Unstoppable" (T. Dayne, A. Roman) – (4:07)
4. "Naked Without You" (R. Nowels, A. Roachford, B. Steinberg) – (3:52)
5. "Whatever You Want" (A. Baker, T. Dayne, F. Zarr) – (4:50)
6. "Stand" (H. Hey, S. Saraco) – (4:26)
7. "You Don't Have to Say You Love Me" (S. Napier-Bell, G. Donaggio, V. Pallavicini, V. Wickham) – (4:09)
8. "Love's Gonna Be On Your Side" (T. Dayne, R. Nevil) – (4:27)
9. "Dreams" (T. Dayne, T. Keane) – (4:00)
10. "There Is No Heart That Won't Heal" (D. Warren) – (5:17)
11. "Soon As My Heart Breaks" (T. Dayne, B.E. Mann) – (3:12)
12. "Can't Get Enough of Your Love" (Live) (B. White) – (6:02)
13. "How Can You Mend a Broken Heart" (Live) (B. Gibb, R. Gibb) – (5:14)
14. "Love Will Lead You Back" (Live) (D. Warren) – (7:42)

== Personnel ==
=== Musicians ===
- Taylor Dayne – lead vocals, background vocals
- Robert A. Arbitter – keyboards
- Jamie Muhoberac – keyboards
- Tom Keane – programming
- Carmen Rizzo – programming, percussion, drums
- Craig Else – guitar
- Louis Metoyer – guitar
- Tim Pierce – guitar
- Joel Shearer – guitar
- Tony Bruno – electric guitar
- Saul Zonana – acoustic guitar, bass
- Reggie Hamilton – bass
- Curt Bisquera – drums
- Ernie Lake – drums
- Joe Bell – string arrangements
- Yvonne Williams – background vocals
- Therese Willis – background vocals

=== Production ===
- Taylor Dayne – arranger
- Tom Keane – arranger
- Eddie DeLena – engineer
- Adam Kagan – engineer
- Ray Pyle – engineer
- Mike Ross – engineer
- Carmen Rizzo – engineer, mixing
- Andrew Scheps – engineer, mixing
- Rob Chiarelli – mixing
- Jez Colin – mixing
- Pete Lorimer – mixing
- Dave Way – mixing
- C.J. DeVillar – assistant engineer
- Yoshi Sakashita – assistant engineer
- Lee Moore – wardrobe
- Omar Galeano – production assistant
- David Gardner – hair stylist
- Bert Stern – photography
