= The Shadow (1994 film) =

1994 superhero film by Russell Mulcahy

- Theatrical release poster by Michael Kaluta
- Directed by: Russell Mulcahy
- Screenplay by: David Koepp
- Based on: The Shadow by Walter B. Gibson
- Produced by: Martin Bregman; Willi Baer; Michael S. Bregman
- Starring: Alec Baldwin; John Lone; Penelope Ann Miller; Peter Boyle; Ian McKellen; Jonathan Winters; Tim Curry
- Cinematography: Stephen H. Burum
- Edited by: Peter Honess; Beth Jochem Besterveld
- Music by: Jerry Goldsmith
- Production companies: Bregman/Baer Productions, inc.
- Distributed by: Universal Pictures
- Release date: July 1, 1994
- Running time: 108 minutes
- Country: United States
- Language: English
- Budget: $40 million
- Box office: $48 million

The Shadow is a 1994 American superhero film from Universal Pictures, produced by Martin Bregman, Willi Bear, and Michael Scott Bregman, and directed by Russell Mulcahy. It stars Alec Baldwin, supported by John Lone, Penelope Ann Miller, Peter Boyle, Ian McKellen, Jonathan Winters, and Tim Curry. The film is based on the pulp fiction character of the same name created in 1931 by Walter B. Gibson. The film was released to theaters on July 1, 1994, received mixed reviews, and was a commercial failure.

== Plot ==
Following the First World War, Lamont Cranston sets himself up as a opium drug kingpin and warlord in Tibet. The Tulku, a mysterious holy man who exhibits psychic abilities, abducts Cranston and offers him a chance to become a force for good. Cranston initially refuses and is attacked by the Tulku's Phurba, a mystical flying dagger after Cranston tries to steal it. Ultimately, Cranston becomes the Tulku's student and develops psychic abilities of his own, including how to hypnotize others and bend their perceptions so that he becomes invisible, save for his shadow.

Cranston returns to New York City seven years later and resumes his former life as a wealthy playboy, while secretly operating as The Shadow, a vigilante who terrorizes the city's underworld. He recruits some of those he saves from criminals to act as his agents, providing him with information and specialist knowledge. His identity is largely unknown, especially to his Uncle Wainwright, who happens to be the Police Commissioner of New York, whom he has to regularly hypnotize in order to keep the police from interfering with him. Cranston's secret identity is endangered upon meeting Margo Lane, a socialite who is also telepathic.

Shiwan Khan, a powerful rogue protégé of the Tulku, arrives in New York inside Genghis Khan's sarcophagus. As Khan's last descendant, Shiwan plans to fulfill his ancestor's ambitions of world domination. He proposes an alliance to Cranston, who refuses. After acquiring a rare coin from Khan, Cranston learns that it is made of bronzium, a metal that could be used for nuclear fission, and that Margo's father Reinhardt—a scientist working on energy research for the War Department—has become uncharacteristically reclusive and aloof. Cranston deduces that Khan has compelled Reinhardt to create an atomic bomb.

Khan hypnotizes Margo and commands her to kill The Shadow. Cranston breaks Khan's hypnotic hold on her, but she learns his secret identity. Reinhardt's assistant Farley Claymore allies with Khan to produce a working bomb, which Khan uses to hold New York to ransom. The Shadow eventually discovers Khan's location: the luxurious Hotel Monolith, a building that Khan has rendered forgotten and invisible to the city's inhabitants. Entering the hotel for a showdown with Khan, The Shadow is subdued by the Phurba before he turns it against Khan, disrupting Khan's hypnotic control over Reinhardt and the city. While Margo and Reinhardt disarm the bomb, The Shadow pursues Khan through the hotel and defeats him by telekinetically hurling a broken shard of glass into his frontal lobe.

Khan awakens in the padded cell of a mental hospital. One of the doctors tells Khan that they were able to save his life by removing a part of his brain, nullifying Khan's psychic abilities, before walking away and revealing a ring the Shadow gives to his agents. Cranston and Margo begin a relationship and join forces to fight the criminal underworld.

== Cast ==
- Alec Baldwin as Lamont Cranston / The Shadow, a wealthy playboy and former Tibetan drug kingpin who operates as a vigilante.
- John Lone as Shiwan Kahn, the last descendant of Genghis Khan.
- Penelope Ann Miller as Margo Lane, a socialite who befriends Cranston.
- Ian McKellen as Dr. Reinhardt Lane, a scientist, the father of Margo.
- Peter Boyle as Moses "Moe" Shrevnitz, a taxi cab driver, allied with the Shadow.
- Jonathan Winters as Wainwright Barth, Lamont's uncle, and Police Commissioner.
- Tim Curry as Farley Claymore, a scientist and former assistant to Dr. Lane, allied with Shiwan Khan.
- Joseph Maher as Isaac Newboldt, curator of the New York museum.
- John Kapelos as Duke Rollins
- Max Wright as Berger, assistant curator of the museum.
- Sab Shimono as Dr. Roy Tam, a Chinese scientist rescued by the Shadow and helping him.
- Brady Tsurutani as the Tulku
- Andre Gregory as Burbank, an ally of the Shadow who runs his spy network.
- James Hong as Li Peng
- Arsenio "Sonny" Trinidad as Wu
- Ethan Phillips as Nelson, a guard at the museum.
- Abraham Benrubi and Steve Hytner as Marines guarding Dr. Lane's laboratory.
- Kate McGregor Stewart as Mrs. Shrevnitz
- Frank Welker as the voice of Phurba

== Production ==
Producer Martin Bregman bought the rights to The Shadow in 1982. Robert Zemeckis had been involved with a film adaptation in the 1980s, while Sam Raimi's pitch was ignored. Universal allowed Raimi to develop an original treatment inspired by The Shadow in 1987 with the development of Darkman. David Koepp had listened to the radio serial of The Shadow as a child, when CBS re-ran it on Sunday nights. Koepp was hired in 1990 to write a new draft, and was able to find the right tone that the studio liked. Bregman remembers, 'Some of them were light, some of them were darker, and others were supposedly funnier – which they weren't. It just didn't work.' Koepp's script relied predominantly on the pulp novels while taking the overall tone from the radio show, with the actual plot originated by Koepp himself in consultation with Bregman.

In an attempt to differentiate The Shadow from other superhero films of the time, Koepp "focused on the copy line 'Who knows what evil lurks in the hearts of men?' and wondered how [the Shadow] knew what evil lurks in the hearts of men. And I decided that perhaps it was because he was uncomfortably familiar with the evil in his own heart." For Koepp, the film then became "a story of guilt and atonement." He picked Shiwan Khan as the film's villain because "he was bold and he knew what he was doing – he wanted to conquer the world. That was very simple, maybe a little ambitious, but he knew exactly what he wanted." He had always been a fan of Alec Baldwin and wrote the script with him in mind: "He has the eyes and the voice; he had so much of what I pictured Cranston being." Koepp also sat in on rehearsals and incorporated a lot of the actor's humor into the script.

Stephen H. Burum served as cinematographer.

The Shadow was shot on the Universal backlot in Hollywood on five sound-stages over sixty days with a five-day mini-unit tour of location shooting, and a week lost when an earthquake destroyed the Hall of Mirrors set. Mulcahy said, 'There are a lot of FX in this film, but it's not a FX film. It's a character/story-driven film. The FX are part of the story.'

The Shadow uses a mix of traditional practical and optical effects alongside computer-generated imagery.

== Music ==
The score for The Shadow was composed by Jerry Goldsmith, who used his (at the time) signature music style for big orchestra, supported by a prominent percussion section, and musical effects with the help of instruments, especially synthesizers. Among the leitmotifs of his score are a romantically dark, yet lush heroic melodic main theme for the protagonist, which is accompanied by several secondary themes. For the antagonist, rather than a fully developed theme, Goldsmith used a musical effect in horns and synthesizers imitating a howling sound, a technique that would later echo in his scores for The Ghost and the Darkness (1996) and The Edge (1997).

For the album and end credits, Taylor Dayne performed the Jim Steinman-composed song "Original Sin". This had originally appeared on the album of the same name, recorded by the female group Pandora's Box. Diane Warren also composed a period-style big-band piece, "Some Kind of Mystery", performed by Sinoa during the film's first nightclub scene.

The Arista Records label released the soundtrack album in 1994. It featured selections from Goldsmith's score and the songs from the film, "Original Sin" appearing in two different versions.

In 2012, Intrada Records released a two-CD set that features the world premiere of the entire soundtrack composed by Goldsmith, and (among other bonus tracks) the complete original album cut on the second disc.

== Merchandising ==
James Luceno wrote the novelization which elaborated further on the story presented in the film.

A video game version of The Shadow for the Super NES was developed to tie in with the 1994 film, but was never released (despite being completed) due to the film's disappointing box-office gross.

Midway (under the Bally label) released a Shadow-themed pinball machine in 1994. Brian Eddy (of Attack From Mars and Medieval Madness fame) designed the game. It was his first pinball game design, and it was moderately successful. Dan Forden composed its original music.

== Reception ==
=== Box office ===
The Shadow was meant to be a summer blockbuster and the starting point for a new film franchise with toy, game, and clothing lines. It suffered from competition for its target audience with, among others, The Lion King (earlier during its run) and The Mask (later on), and was ultimately a financial failure. The film started off strongly, debuting at No. 2, but failed to sustain any momentum, and grossed $32 million domestically, with a worldwide total of $48 million against a budget of $40 million. The planned franchise never materialized.

=== Critical response ===
On Rotten Tomatoes, the film has an approval rating of 38%, based on reviews from 53 critics. The website's consensus states: "Bringing a classic pulp character to the big screen, The Shadow features impressive visual effects, but the story ultimately fails to strike a memorable chord." On Metacritic it has a score of 50% based on reviews from 30 critics, indicating "mixed or average reviews". Audiences surveyed by CinemaScore gave the film a grade "B" on scale of A to F.

Brian Lowry of Variety wrote that, despite similarities, the Shadow "lacks the visceral appeal of Batman and won't strike the same chord." Owen Gleiberman of Entertainment Weekly gave the film a grade 'D', adding: 'The trouble with setting a special-effects fantasy in the low-tech ’20s is that unless the American-kitsch elements are injected with something approaching Steven Spielberg's speedy bravado, we become all too aware that the actors are simply standing around B-movie sets spouting cardboard dialogue.' Entertainment Weekly would later place the film on its list of the "21 Worst Comic-Book Movies Ever".

Michael Wilmington, writing for the Chicago Tribune, gave his take on the film: "The Shadow shows what can happen when you overdress pulp. You wind up with something gorgeous and suffocated, bejeweled trash floundering in its over-splendid stuffings." Roger Ebert, writing for the Chicago Sun-Times gave the film 3 out of 4 stars, and said: 'If you respond to film noir, if you like dark streets and women with scarlet lips and big fast cars with running boards, the look of this movie will work some kind of magic.' Jack Yeovil of Empire gave it 3 out 5 and called it "A pleasant, eye-pleasing movie" he further praises the production design and effects, "but the plot never really gels, and for an action fantasy is rather cold".
