= Say a Prayer =

1995 single by Taylor Dayne

Single by Taylor Dayne

from the album Soul Dancing and Greatest Hits
- Released: November 6, 1995
- Length: 5:23 (1993 album version); 3:59 (1995 remix version)
- Label: Arista
- Songwriters: Taylor Dayne; Shep Pettibone; Tony Shimkin
- Producer: Shep Pettibone

Taylor Dayne singles chronology
"Original Sin" (1994)	"Say a Prayer" (1995)	"Whatever You Want" (1998)

Alternative cover

Audio video
- "Say a Prayer" on YouTube

"Say a Prayer" is a song by American vocalist Taylor Dayne from her third studio album, Soul Dancing (1993). It was written by Dayne, Shep Pettibone and Tony Shimkin and was produced by Pettibone. The song was released on November 6, 1995 in remix form for her compilation album, Greatest Hits, and was released that same year by Arista Records.

== Release ==
Taylor did not record any new tracks for her Greatest Hits release. Arista instead released a remixed version of the song as the first single in 1995.

== Chart performance ==
The song was a hit in US dance club, peaking at No. 7 on the US Billboard Dance Club Play chart. It also peaked at number 58 on the UK Singles Chart.

== Charts ==
Chart (1995)	Peak position
Australia (ARIA)	116
Scottish Singles Sales (Official Charts)	77
UK Singles (Official Charts)	58
US Dance Club Songs (Billboard)	7
US Dance Singles Sales (Billboard)	9

== Release history ==
Region	Date	Format(s)	Label(s)	Ref.
United States	1995	12-inch vinyl; CD; cassette	Arista	
United Kingdom	November 6, 1995	CD; cassette	Arista; BMG	
