= Facing a Miracle =

Single by Taylor Dayne
- Released: 1 July 2010
- Genre: Dance-pop
- Length: 3:43
- Label: Intention
- Songwriters: Dan Sundquist, Ralph van Manen, Peter Hägeras and Bruce R.F. Smith

Taylor Dayne singles chronology
| "My Heart Can't Change" (2008) | "Facing a Miracle" (2010) | "Floor on Fire" (2011) |

Audio video
- "Facing a Miracle" on YouTube

"Facing a Miracle" is the official theme song to the 2010 Gay Games. Dayne performed the song to an audience of 50,000 fans on July 31, 2010 in Cologne, Germany. It ended the year at #9 on Perfect Beat's Top Worldwide Singles of 2010.

The song was given a hard tribal club remix in 2010 by U.S. producers Joel Dickinson, John Michael & Billy Waters featuring the vocals of African a cappella group Il Quinto.

The song was remixed again in October 2010 by Swedish DJ/producer LA Rush.

== Composition ==
The song is written in a 4/4 time signature at a tempo at 111bpm. It combines electronic elements with strings. The song is written in A Major, but parts of the song use modal mixture into A Mixolydian and A Aeolian, and the last chorus modulates up to Bb Major.

== Lyrics ==
The song's lyrics are about how in our darkest moments, life can only get better. The chorus uses gambling metaphors.
