= I'll Always Love You (Taylor Dayne song) =

Single by Taylor Dayne

from the album Tell It to My Heart
- B-side: "Where Does That Boy Hang Out"
- Released: May 6, 1988
- Recorded: 1987
- Genre: R&B; pop
- Length: 4:33
- Label: Arista
- Songwriter: Jimmy George
- Producer: Ric Wake

Taylor Dayne singles chronology
"Prove Your Love" (1988)	"I'll Always Love You" (1988)	"Don't Rush Me" (1988)

Music video
- "I'll Always Love You" on YouTube

"I'll Always Love You" is a song by American singer Taylor Dayne and the third single from her debut studio album, Tell It to My Heart (1988). It was released on May 6, 1988, via Arista Records. It was penned by Jimmy George and produced by Ric Wake.

Dayne was nominated for a Grammy Award for Best Female R&B Vocal for her performance on "I'll Always Love You" in 1989. The song was also nominated for Best R&B Song that year. "I'll Always Love You" was certified gold by the Recording Industry Association of America (RIAA).

== Background ==
The song is a romantic ballad, showcasing Dayne's softer side—after the first two singles released were mainly freestyle, dance-pop tracks—paving her way to the adult contemporary charts. It features sensuous love lyrics accompanied by a saxophone instrumental performed by Richie Cannata, who has played for other mainstream acts, including the Billy Joel Band.

== Critical reception ==
Betty Hollars and John Martinucci of the Gavin Report responded favorably saying, "Taylor Dayne decelerates from 100BPM and coasts into a ballad. Urban stations shouldn't have trouble taking to this third release from her debut album, Tell It To My Heart."

== Chart performance ==
This single was her first crossover hit, being her first song on the adult contemporary radio format and her only song to chart on the R&B chart. It reached number three on the Billboard Hot 100 during both of the weeks that "Don't Worry, Be Happy", by Bobby McFerrin, held the number-one spot (the weeks ending September 24 and October 1, 1988). "I'll Always Love You" stayed in the Hot 100 for 30 weeks. It also held the number-two spot on Billboard's Adult Contemporary Chart for two weeks, behind "One Good Woman", by Peter Cetera.

== Track listings and formats ==
- US, 7" vinyl

A1: "I'll Always Love You — 4:18
B1: "Where Does That Boy Hang Out — 4:18

- US, 12" vinyl maxi-single

A1: "I'll Always Love You" (Single Mix) — 6:40
A2: "I'll Always Love You" (Extended Mix) — 7:40
B1: "Tell It To My Heart" (House Mix) — 8:54
B2: "Prove Your Love" (House Mix) — 7:30

- US, Cassette single

A1: "I'll Always Love You — 4:18
B1: "Where Does That Boy Hang Out — 4:18

- Japan, 7" vinyl

A1: "I'll Always Love You — 4:18
B1: "Where Does That Boy Hang Out — 4:18

- UK, 7" vinyl

A1: "I'll Always Love You — 4:18
B1: "Where Does That Boy Hang Out — 4:18

- UK, CD single
1. "I'll Always Love You" (Extended Mix) — 6:40
2. "Prove Your Love" (House Mix) — 7:30
3. "Where Does That Boy Hang Out — 4:18
- Germany CD single
1. "I'll Always Love You" (Extended Mix) — 6:40
2. "Prove Your Love" (House Mix) — 7:30
3. "Where Does That Boy Hang Out — 4:18
- Australia, 7" vinyl

A: "I'll Always Love You — 4:18
B: "Where Does That Boy Hang Out — 4:18

== Charts ==
=== Weekly charts ===
Chart (1988)	Peak position
Australia (ARIA)	86
Canada Top Singles (RPM)	10
Dutch Singles Chart	85
Germany (Official German Charts)	38
Italy (FIMI)	12
Switzerland (Schweizer Hitparade)	30
UK Singles (Official Charts Company)	41
US Billboard Hot 100	3
US Adult Contemporary (Billboard)	2
US Hot Black Singles (Billboard)	21

=== Year-end charts ===
Chart (1988)	Position
Canada Top Singles (RPM)	88
US Billboard Hot 100	20

== Certifications ==
Region	Certification	Certified units/sales
United States (RIAA)	Gold	500,000^{^}
^{^} Shipments figures based on certification alone.

== In popular culture ==
In 2012, Dayne performed this song live on This American Life, using it to serenade comedian Tig Notaro, who, every time she had previously encountered Dayne, used to greet her by saying, "Excuse me, I'm sorry to bother you, but I just have to tell you. I love your voice."
