= Tell It to My Heart (Taylor Dayne song) =

1987 single by Taylor Dayne

Single by Taylor Dayne

from the album Tell It to My Heart
- Released: July 24, 1987
- Studio: Cove City Sound (Glen Cove, New York)
- Genre: Dance-pop; synth-pop; freestyle; hi-NRG
- Length: 3:38
- Label: Arista
- Songwriters: Seth Swirsky; Ernie Gold
- Producer: Ric Wake

Taylor Dayne singles chronology
"Tell It to My Heart" (1987)	"Prove Your Love" (1988)

Music video
- "Tell It to My Heart" on YouTube

"Tell It to My Heart" is a song performed by American singer and songwriter Taylor Dayne, released on July 24, 1987, by Arista Records as her first single from her debut album, Tell It to My Heart (1988). The single was Dayne's first major exposure, and she soon became known for her up-tempo, dance-oriented music. The song was written by Chappell Music staff songwriter Seth Swirsky and Ernie Gold, and produced by Ric Wake. Swirsky almost did not deliver the song to his publisher after he and his girlfriend decided it was not good enough. The song was originally recorded by Louisa Florio in 1987.

The song debuted on the US Billboard Hot 100 during the week of October 10, 1987, at position number 92, and entered the top 40 of the chart the week of November 14, 1987, rising to number 39 from number 43. Ten weeks later, during the week of January 23, 1988, the single peaked in the number seven spot. The song was present on the Hot 100 for 25 weeks. In the UK, "Tell It To My Heart" reached number three on the UK Singles Chart. It was the 23rd best-selling single of 1988 in the UK. In 1995, "Tell It to My Heart'" was remixed and re-released to promote Dayne's Greatest Hits package. This version climbed to number 23 on the UK Singles Chart.

== Background ==
"Tell It to My Heart" reached Taylor Dayne when Dayne contacted Chappell Music and asked to be sent some demos which had been overlooked, although the song had been recorded in early 1987 by Louisa Florio for a self-titled Canadian album release. Dayne recalled feeling an immediate affinity with the song: "I thought there was something about the hook – it's a happy hook." The track was recorded at Cove City Sound Studios in Glen Cove, Long Island. Dayne's father loaned her $6,000 to create the demo. The track took off so unexpectedly in the fall of 1987 that Taylor was forced to complete her debut album at Cove City Sound in eight weeks.

Swirsky also co-wrote Dayne's follow-up single "Prove Your Love". For almost two months, only the 12-inch record of "Tell It to My Heart" with four mixes was available for purchase, and ended up selling 900,000 copies alone.

Dayne was nominated for a Grammy Award for Best Pop Vocal, Female for her performance on "Tell It to My Heart" in 1988. Producer Ric Wake said in a 1994 interview with Vibe magazine that "Tell It to My Heart" "really blew people away". Commenting on Taylor Dayne's voice he said "They thought she was, like, black or some kind of ethnic...".

== Critical reception ==
Lysette Cohen from Record Mirror wrote, "The single is one of those unbelievably catchy ones, full of what Taylor calls, "happy hooks". Yet it is more imposing and robust then your average dancefloor ditty. There's real guts in there. A little like the lady herself perhaps?" Another Record Mirror editor, Matthew Collin, felt that the single showed that Dayne "makes a brilliant disco queen".

== Impact and legacy ==
In 2023, Time Out ranked "Tell It to My Heart" number 80 in their "The 100 Best Party Songs Ever Made", writing, "The Long Island native born Leslie Wunderman sounds positively voracious on her 1987 signature hit. Few dance-pop classics feel more urgent or fierce than 'Tell It to My Heart'; you can see that Dayne's been waiting her whole life to belt out lines like 'Body to body / Soul to soul / Always feel you near.' The lyrics might read like bad student poetry, but blend them with unabashedly hammy '80s synths and a so-passionate-it's-a-little-scary delivery, and the result is a sonic Roman candle, blasting fireballs of fun onto the dance floor." Same year, Rolling Stone ranked it number 148 in their "The 200 Best '80s Songs", adding, "Miami freestyle hits the Long Island bar-mitzvah circuit to conquer Middle America. Result: a permanent disco floor-filler."

== Track listings ==
- 7-inch single
1. "Tell It to My Heart" – 3:31
2. "Tell It to My Heart" (Instrumental) – 3:15
- 12-inch maxi
1. "Tell It to My Heart" (Club Mix) – 6:46
2. "Tell It to My Heart" (Percapella Mix) – 3:21
3. "Tell It to My Heart" (Single Mix) – 3:34
4. "Tell It to My Heart" (Dub Mix) – 5:47
- 12-inch maxi – Remix
1. "Tell It to My Heart" (House of Hearts Mix) – 8:43
2. "Tell It to My Heart" (Radio Edit) – 3:31
3. "Tell It to My Heart" (Dub of Hearts Mix) – 6:43
- 2007 "Beautiful" iTunes single & Promo CD single
1. "Beautiful"
2. "Tell It to My Heart" (2008 version) – 3:41

(Released as the b-side of "Beautiful" on U.S. iTunes and promotional CD single)

== Cover versions ==
- Greek singer Bessy Argyraki covered the song in greek as: "Tha andistatho" (I will resist) for her 1988 released album "Ela ksana" (Έλα ξανά) which includes covers of big international late 80's hits.
- A Spanish-language version titled "Díselo a mi corazón" was included on Spanish pop group Amistades Peligrosas's 1993 album, La última tentación.
- In 2002, English singer Kelly Llorenna released her version of the song as a single. It peaked at number nine in the United Kingdom and number 31 in Ireland.
- In 2011, American singer Raquela (Burt) released her version of the song as a single. It stayed on the DJ Times Top 40 dance charts for 28 weeks.
- An electronic version by the Russian duo Filatov & Karas was released in 2016. It has over 60 million views on YouTube.
- In 2023, Cash Cash released a remix version of this song with newly re-recorded vocals from Dayne.
- In 2026, a version was used in a commercial for the cereal brand Honey Nut Cheerios called "Talk to Your Heart".

== Charts ==
=== Weekly charts ===
1987–1988 weekly chart performance for "Tell It to My Heart" (Taylor Dayne version)
Chart (1987–1988)	Peak position
Australia (Australian Music Report)	10
Austria (Ö3 Austria Top 40)	1
Belgium (Ultratop 50 Flanders)	2
Canada Top Singles (RPM)	9
Denmark (Tracklisten)	1
Europe (European Hot 100 Singles)	1
Finland (Suomen virallinen lista)	3
France (SNEP)	11
Greece (IFPI)	2
Ireland (IRMA)	2
Italy Airplay (Music & Media)	15
Netherlands (Dutch Top 40)	1
Netherlands (Single Top 100)	1
New Zealand (Recorded Music NZ)	7
Norway (VG-lista)	3
Panama (UPI)	9
South Africa (Springbok Radio)	11
Spain (AFYVE)	5
Sweden (Sverigetopplistan)	3
Switzerland (Schweizer Hitparade)	1
UK Singles (Official Charts)	3
UK Dance (Music Week)	1
US Billboard Hot 100	7
US Dance Club Songs (Billboard)	4
US Dance Singles Sales (Billboard)	3
US Cash Box Top 100	9
West Germany (GfK)	1

1996 weekly chart performance for "Tell It to My Heart" (Taylor Dayne version)
Chart (1996)	Peak position
Finland (Suomen virallinen lista)	15
US Dance Club Songs (Billboard)	10

Weekly chart performance for "Tell It to My Heart" (Kelly Llorenna version)
Chart (2002)	Peak position
Europe (Eurochart Hot 100)	44
Ireland (IRMA)	31
Ireland Dance (IRMA)	5
Scottish Singles Sales (Official Charts)	3
UK Singles (Official Charts)	9
UK Dance (Official Charts)	7

Weekly chart performance for "Tell It to My Heart" (Cash Cash remix version)
Chart (2023)	Peak position
Canada Hot AC (Billboard)	34
US Hot Dance/Electronic Songs (Billboard)	32

=== Year-end charts ===
Year-end chart performance for "Tell It to My Heart" (Taylor Dayne version)
Chart (1988)	Position
Australia (ARIA)	43
Austria (Ö3 Austria Top 40)	17
Belgium (Ultratop 50 Flanders)	23
Canada Top Singles (RPM)	96
Europe (European Hot 100 Singles)	4
Europe (European Airplay Top 50)	17
Netherlands (Dutch Top 40)	19
Netherlands (Single Top 100)	15
New Zealand (RIANZ)	50
Switzerland (Schweizer Hitparade)	10
UK Singles (OCC)	23
UK Dance (Music Week)	8
US Billboard Hot 100	53
US 12-inch Singles Sales (Billboard)	34
West Germany (Media Control)	8

1985–1989 chart performance for "Tell It to My Heart" (Taylor Dayne version)
Chart (1985–1989)	Position
Europe (European Hot 100 Singles)	26

Year-end chart performance for "Tell It to My Heart" (Kelly Llorenna version)
Chart (2002)	Position
UK Singles (OCC)	132

Year-end chart performance for "Tell It to My Heart" (Cash Cash remix version)
Chart (2024)	Position
US Dance/Mix Show Airplay (Billboard)	39

== Certifications ==
Certifications for "Tell It to My Heart"
Region	Certification	Certified units/sales
Germany (BVMI)	Gold	250,000^{^}
Sweden (GLF)	Gold	25,000^{^}
United Kingdom (BPI)	Platinum	600,000^{‡}
United Kingdom (BPI) Kelly Llorenna version	Silver	200,000^{‡}
United States (RIAA)	Gold	1,000,000^{^}
^{^} Shipments figures based on certification alone.^{‡} Sales+streaming figures based on certification alone.
