= Beautiful (Taylor Dayne song) =

Single by Taylor Dayne

from the album Satisfied
- B-side: "Tell It to My Heart (2008 version)
- Released: December 11, 2007
- Genre: Soul
- Length: 3:49
- Label: Adrenaline
- Songwriter(s): Taylor Dayne; Hitesh Ceon
- Producer(s): Hitesh Ceon; Richie Jones

Taylor Dayne singles chronology
"Naked Without You" (1999)	"Beautiful" (2007)	"My Heart Can't Change" (2008)

Audio video
- "Beautiful" on YouTube

"Beautiful" is a single released by Taylor Dayne in late 2007 as the lead single from her 5th studio album Satisfied. In the spring of 2008 the single reached number 1 on the US Dance chart becoming her third song to reach the peak position. The song is written by Taylor Dayne and Hitesh Ceon of production team Element, and produced by Hitesh Ceon and Richie Jones.

== Charts ==
=== Weekly charts ===
Chart (2008)	Peak position
US Dance Club Songs (Billboard)	1
US Adult Contemporary (Billboard)	23

=== Year-end charts ===
Chart (2008)	Position
US Dance Club Songs (Billboard)	46
