= Heart of Stone (Taylor Dayne song) =

1990 single by Taylor Dayne

- CD single cover

Single by Taylor Dayne

from the album Can't Fight Fate
- B-side: "Wait for Me"
- Released: July 23, 1990
- Length: 4:17
- Label: Arista
- Songwriters: Elliot Wolff; Gregg Tripp
- Producer: Ric Wake

Taylor Dayne singles chronology
"I'll Be Your Shelter" (1990)	"Heart of Stone" (1990)	"Can't Get Enough of Your Love, Baby" (1993)

Music video
- "Taylor Dayne - Heart Of Stone" on YouTube

"Heart of Stone" is a song by American singer Taylor Dayne for her second studio album, Can't Fight Fate (1989). Produced by Ric Wake, the song was released in July 1990 by Arista Records as the fourth and final single from Can't Fight Fate. The song is co-written by Elliot Wolff, responsible for Paula Abdul's number-one singles "Straight Up" and "Cold Hearted".

The single performed better on the US Adult Contemporary chart than it did on the Billboard Hot 100; it broke Dayne's streak of seven consecutive top-10 singles on the Billboard Hot 100, reaching number 12. The accompanying music video for "Heart of Stone" was included in Dayne's music video collection Twist of Fate.

== Charts ==
=== Weekly charts ===
Chart (1990)	Peak position
Australia (ARIA)	42
Canada Top Singles (RPM)	4
Canada Adult Contemporary (RPM)	1
US Billboard Hot 100	12
US Adult Contemporary (Billboard)	8

=== Year-end charts ===
Chart (1990)	Position
Canada Top Singles (RPM)	56
Canada Adult Contemporary (RPM)	18

== Release history ==
Region	Date	Format(s)	Label(s)	Ref.
United States	July 23, 1990	7-inch vinyl; cassette	Arista	
Japan	September 21, 1990	Mini-CD	Arista	
Australia	December 10, 1990	7-inch vinyl; cassette	Arista	
