= Can't Fight Fate =

Studio album by Taylor Dayne
- Released: October 31, 1989
- Studios: Cove City Sound Studios (Glen Cove, New York); Shakedown Sound Studios (New York City; The Hit Factory (New York); Ocean Way Recording (Hollywood); The Complex (Los Angeles)
- Genres: Dance; pop; rock
- Length: 43:41
- Label: Arista
- Producer: Ric Wake (For Wake Productions)

Taylor Dayne chronology
Tell It to My Heart (1987)	Can't Fight Fate (1989)	Soul Dancing (1993)

Singles from Can't Fight Fate
- 1. "With Every Beat of My Heart" Released: October 10, 1989; 2. "Love Will Lead You Back" Released: January 20, 1990; 3. "I'll Be Your Shelter" Released: March 20, 1990; 4. "Heart of Stone" Released: July 23, 1990

Professional ratings
Review scores
Source	Rating
AllMusic	4.5/5 stars
Select	1/5 stars

Can't Fight Fate is the second studio album by American singer and songwriter Taylor Dayne, released on October 31, 1989, by Arista Records. The album continued her chart success and was certified 2× Platinum by the Recording Industry Association of America (RIAA). It includes the Billboard Hot 100 singles "With Every Beat of My Heart" (No. 5) and "I'll Be Your Shelter" (No. 4), the number one "Love Will Lead You Back" and "Heart of Stone" (No. 12).

== Critical reception ==
AllMusic editor Jose F. Promis retrospectively declared the album's ballads "lush and dramatic", mentioning "Love Will Lead You Back". However, he felt that the "real killers" are the rock songs, which Dayne "delivers like a true, seasoned rock star", noting that "I'll Be Your Shelter" "brings to mind Tina Turner". Promis highlighted also "You Can't Fight Fate" and "Ain't No Good", and concluded, "Years after its release, this album stands the test of time, and can safely be classified as one of the more diverse and exciting dance/pop/rock albums of the late '80s/early '90s." People stated, "Not many singers can go from hot to dreamy and back again as smoothly as Dayne does on this first-rate album." The reviewer felt the singer "has the spirit and rhythmic sense" to turn "I'll Be Your Shelter" into "a vivacious party track", but remarked that she also can "dig for depth and rich tone" on ballads, such as "Love Will Lead You Back".

== Track listing ==
Can't Fight Fate track listing
No.	Title	Writer(s)	Length
1.	"With Every Beat of My Heart"	Tommy Faragher; Lotti Golden; Arthur Baker	4:22
2.	"I'll Be Your Shelter"	Diane Warren	4:43
3.	"Love Will Lead You Back"	Warren	4:38
4.	"Heart of Stone"	Elliot Wolff; Gregg Tripp	4:17
5.	"You Can't Fight Fate"	Warren	4:42
6.	"Up All Night"	Shelly Peiken; Steve Rimland; Kennan Keating	4:04
7.	"I Know the Feeling"	Marvin Hamlisch; Alan Bergman; Marilyn Bergman	4:48
8.	"Wait for Me"	Antonina Armato; Rick Neigher	3:42
9.	"You Meant the World to Me"	Taylor Dayne; Ric Wake	4:09
10.	"Ain't No Good"	Dayne; Tommy Byrnes; Wake	4:04
Total length:			43:29

2014 remastered deluxe edition (Disc 1 - bonus tracks)
No.	Title	Writer(s)	Length
11.	"All I Ever Wanted"	A. Forbes; P. Lallemand; T. Derkach	3:28
12.	"With Every Beat of My Heart" (Extended Radio Remix)	Faragher; Golden; Baker	6:32
13.	"I'll Be Your Shelter" (Extended Remix)	Warren	5:35

2014 remastered deluxe edition (Disc 2)
No.	Title	Writer(s)	Length
1.	"Love Will Lead You Back" (Single Version)	Warren	4:27
2.	"I'll Be Your Shelter" (Single Version)	Warren	4:06
3.	"Heart of Stone" (Single Version)	Wolff; Tripp	4:00
4.	"With Every Beat of Your Heart" (Palpitashun Remix)	Faragher; Golden; Baker	7:10
5.	"I'll Be Your Shelter" (Groove Mix)	Warren	5:03
6.	"With Every Beat of My Heart" (Mental Dub Edit)	Faragher; Golden; Baker	8:03
7.	"Up All Night" (The Sunrise Mix)	Peiken; Rimland; Keating	8:02
8.	"With Every Beat of My Heart" (Make It Rock Remix)	Faragher; Golden; Baker	7:03
9.	"Up All Night" (Insomnia Dub)	Peiken; Rimland; Keating	6:42
10.	"With Every Beat of My Heart" (Mental Dub)	Faragher; Golden; Baker	9:36

== Personnel ==
=== Musicians ===
- Taylor Dayne – lead vocals, backing vocals (2, 5, 10), arrangements (10)
- Rich Tancredi – keyboards (1–4, 6–10), arrangements (1, 3, 4, 6–10)
- Tommy Byrnes – guitars (2, 10), rhythm guitar (5), backing vocals (10)
- Bob Cadway – guitars (3, 4, 7, 8, 9)
- Blues Saraceno – lead guitar (5)
- Kevin Jenkins – bass (2)
- T.M. Stevens – bass (5)
- Joe Franco – drums (1–5, 7–10)
- Richie Jones – drum programming (6)
- Joel Peskin – sax solo (1, 9)
- Richie Cannata – saxophone (4, 5, 7)
- Jerry Hey – trumpet (1, 9), trumpet arrangements (1), horn arrangements (9)
- Gary Grant – trumpet (1, 9)
- Bill Reichenbach Jr. – trumpet (1), trombone (9)
- Paul Tuthill – trumpet (5)
- Ric Wake – arrangements
- Jamillah Muhammad – backing vocals (1, 3–10)
- Ricky Nelson – backing vocals (1, 3, 7)
- Billy T. Scott – backing vocals (1, 3–10), BGV arrangements (1, 3, 4, 8)
- Gloria Weems – backing vocals (1, 4)
- Kathy Troccoli – backing vocals (2)

=== Production ===
- Clive Davis – executive producer
- Ric Wake – producer
- Bob Cadway – recording, mixing
- Greg Arnold – assistant engineer
- Thom Cadley – assistant engineer
- Robert "Void" Caprio – assistant engineer
- Susan Gibbons – assistant engineer
- Dan Hetzel – assistant engineer
- Rail Rogut – assistant engineer
- Brett Swain – assistant engineer
- Mario Vasquez – assistant engineer
- Thomas R. Yezzi – assistant engineer
- Greg Calbi – mastering at Sterling Sound (New York City, New York)
- David Barratt – production coordinator
- Susan Mendola – art direction
- Wayne Maser – photography
- Philippe Becker – hair stylist, make-up artist
- Juliet Cuming – styling
- Champion Entertainment Organization, Inc. – management

== Charts ==
=== Weekly charts ===
Weekly chart performance for Can't Fight Fate
Chart (1989–1990)	Peak position
Australian Albums (ARIA)	7
Canadian Albums (RPM)	23
New Zealand Albums (RMNZ)	24
Swedish Albums (Sverigetopplistan)	30
Swiss Albums (Schweizer Hitparade)	24
US Billboard 200	25

=== Year-end charts ===
Year-end chart performance for Can't Fight Fate
Chart (1990)	Position
Australian Albums (ARIA)	16
US Billboard 200	20

== Certifications ==
Certifications for Can't Fight Fate
Region	Certification	Certified units/sales
Australia (ARIA)	2× Platinum	140,000^{^}
Canada (Music Canada)	Gold	50,000^{^}
United States (RIAA)	2× Platinum	2,000,000^{^}
^{^} Shipments figures based on certification alone.
