= I'll Be Your Shelter =

1990 single by Taylor Dayne

- CD single cover

Single by Taylor Dayne

from the album Can't Fight Fate
- B-side: "Ain't No Good"
- Released: 1990
- Studio: Cove City Sound (Glen Cove, Long Island)
- Genre: Rock
- Length: 4:43
- Label: Arista
- Songwriter: Diane Warren
- Producer: Ric Wake

Taylor Dayne singles chronology
"Love Will Lead You Back" (1990)	"I'll Be Your Shelter" (1990)	"Heart of Stone" (1990)

Alternative cover

Music video
- "I'll Be Your Shelter" on YouTube

"I'll Be Your Shelter" is a song by American singer Taylor Dayne from her second studio album, Can't Fight Fate (1989). Written by Diane Warren and produced by Ric Wake, the song was released in 1990 by Arista Records as the third single from Can't Fight Fate. The track was initially offered to Tina Turner, who declined it.

In the United States, "I'll Be Your Shelter" reached number four on the US Billboard Hot 100 and number 15 on the Adult Contemporary chart. In Canada, it topped the RPM 100 Singles chart on the week dated August 4, 1990, becoming Dayne's only chart-topper there. Outside North America, the song reached number four in Australia, number 33 in New Zealand, and number 43 in the United Kingdom. Billboard ranked the track Warren's 22nd-biggest hit on the Hot 100 as a songwriter.

== Background and release ==
According to Clive Davis in his autobiography The Soundtrack of My Life, he first heard the track when writer Diane Warren played him three demos of her compositions. It also was the same day Warren found out American singer Tina Turner had declined to record the track, which had upset Warren. She said in The Billboard Book of Number One Hits, "So I said, 'Well I'm going to show them. I'm going to get it cut by somebody else.' [...] I played him 'I'll Be Your Shelter' and he freaked. He thought it would be good for Taylor Dayne."

== Critical reception ==
People Magazine wrote that Dayne had "the spirit and rhythmic sense" to turn the track into a "vivacious party track," although they did note Wake's production as too similar to country rock band Lone Justice's track "Shelter". Steven Daly from Spin called it "a brazen move onto Tina Turner's tuff turf" although saying that the track "almost stalls thanks to some ham-fisted synth bass and clumsy drums."

== Chart performance ==
In the United States, "I'll Be Your Shelter" was Dayne's seventh consecutive (and final) top-10 single on the Billboard Hot 100, where it peaked at number four in 1990. On the Billboard year-end chart for 1990, the track was ranked at number 63. The song also reached number one in Canada for one week in August 1990 and peaked at number four in Australia.

== Music video ==
Dominic Sena directed the music video for "I'll Be Your Shelter". Sena was inspired by films such as Casablanca (1942) and 8½ (1963) and as such they are referenced in the video. The track first made its debut to both Video Hits 1 (VH-1) and Hit Video USA on May 12, 1990.

== Track listings ==
Standard 7-inch and cassette single

1. "I'll Be Your Shelter" – 3:59
2. "Ain't No Good" – 4:03

Standard 12-inch and maxi-CD single

1. "I'll Be Your Shelter" (7" Version) – 3:58
2. "I'll Be Your Shelter" (Extended Remix) – 5:37
3. "Ain't No Good" – 4:27

UK CD single

1. "I'll Be Your Shelter" – 3:59
2. "Ain't No Good" – 4:27
3. "I'll Be Your Shelter" – 5:37
4. "Love Will Lead You Back" – 4:26

== Personnel ==
Personnel are taken from the Can't Fight Fate booklet.

- Taylor Dayne – vocals
- Tommy Byrnes – rhythm and lead guitar
- Rich Tancredi – keyboards
- Kevin Jenkins – bass
- Joe Franco – drums, percussion
- Kathy Troccoli – backing vocals

== Charts ==
=== Weekly charts ===
Chart (1990)	Peak position
Australia (ARIA)	4
Canada Top Singles (RPM)	1
Canada Adult Contemporary (RPM)	6
New Zealand (Recorded Music NZ)	33
UK Singles (Official Charts)	43
US Billboard Hot 100	4
US Adult Contemporary (Billboard)	15
US Top 40/Dance (Billboard)	19
US Cash Box Top 100 Pop Singles	5
US Adult Contemporary (Gavin Report)	11
US Top 40 (Gavin Report)	2
US Adult Contemporary (Radio & Records)	12
US Contemporary Hit Radio (Radio & Records)	3

=== Year-end charts ===
Chart (1990)	Position
Australia (ARIA)	57
Canada Top Singles (RPM)	19
Canada Adult Contemporary (RPM)	61
US Billboard Hot 100	63
US Adult Contemporary (Gavin Report)	63
US Top 40 (Gavin Report)	23
US Adult Contemporary (Radio & Records)	88
US Contemporary Hit Radio (Radio & Records)	31

== Certifications ==
Region	Certification	Certified units/sales
Australia (ARIA)	Gold	35,000^{^}
^{^} Shipments figures based on certification alone.

== Release history ==
Region	Date	Format(s)	Label(s)	Ref.
United States	1990	—N/a	Arista	
Europe	April 23, 1990	7-inch vinyl	Arista	
Japan	June 21, 1990	Mini-CD	Arista	
Australia	August 20, 1990	7-inch vinyl; 12-inch vinyl; cassette	Arista	
