= Original Sin (Taylor Dayne song) =

Taylor Dayne single

Single by Taylor Dayne

from the album The Shadow OST
- Released: 1994
- Recorded: 1994
- Genre: Pop
- Length: 6:23 (album version); 5:24 (single and video edit)
- Label: Arista
- Songwriter(s): Jim Steinman
- Producer(s): Jim Steinman

Taylor Dayne singles chronology
"I'll Wait" (1994)	"Original Sin" (1994)	"Say a Prayer" (1995)

Music video
- "Taylor Dayne - Original Sin (Theme From "The Shadow")" on YouTube

"Original Sin (Theme from the Shadow)" is a song produced, written and arranged by Jim Steinman. Steinman originally wrote, composed, and produced the song for the album of the same name by the musical team called Pandora's Box titled as "Original Sin (The Natives Are Restless Tonight)". American singer Taylor Dayne covered the song (singing to a stripped-down version of the backup tracks recorded for Pandora's Box), and it was released as a single on June 26, 1994 by Arista Records, and included in the soundtrack to the 1994 film The Shadow, starring Alec Baldwin. This version of the song has slightly altered lyrics referring to the themes of the movie (a line about 'evil lurking in the hearts of men today' based on the intro to "The Shadow" radio program) different from the ones sung by Meat Loaf on Welcome to the Neighborhood and Pandora's Box. The photograph displayed on the cover of Dayne's single was shot by Alberto Tolot, taken on the set of its music video.

== Critical reception ==
Larry Flick from Billboard magazine stated, "Dayne's over-the-top vocal style is a perfect match for Jim Steinman's melodramatic, kitchen-sink production", adding, "Dayne chews through an arrangement of grand piano lines, thunderous guitars, and shrill choir chants with impressive energy. Don't be surprised if this bombastic track propels her back onto the pop charts in a huge way." Troy J. Augusto from Cash Box wrote, "With his usual far-over-the-top production excess, Jim Steinman has created for Dayne an epic single worthy of her powerhouse vocals. Similar to his bombastic work with Meat Loaf, 'Original Sin' is layered thick with energetic guitars, orchestral pianos and a heavy-duty vocal choir that'll have 'emdancing in the aisles. It's back to the top o' the heap for Ms. Dayne, whose new album is expected later in the year."

== Charts ==
Chart (1994–95)	Peak position
Australia (ARIA)	203
Scotland (OCC)	72
UK Singles (OCC)	63

"Original Sin" was released in the US as a cassette and CD single, but did not chart on the Billboard Hot 100.

== Cover versions ==
Meat Loaf recorded the song for his album Welcome to the Neighborhood. As previously stated, his version has different lyrics from Dayne's.
