= Tell It to My Heart (album) =

1988 studio album by Taylor Dayne

- Standard artwork

Studio album by Taylor Dayne
- Released: January 19, 1988
- Recorded: 1987
- Studios: Cove City Sound (Glen Cove, New York); Platinum Island (New York City); Power Station (New York City); Quad Recording (New York City); Sigma Sound (New York City)
- Genres: Dance-pop; disco; blue-eyed soul
- Length: 38:48
- Label: Arista
- Producer: Ric Wake (For Bleux Productions)

Taylor Dayne chronology
| Tell It to My Heart (1988) | Can't Fight Fate (1989) |

Singles from Tell It to My Heart
- 1. "Tell It to My Heart" Released: July 24, 1987; 2. "Prove Your Love" Released: February 8, 1988; 3. "I'll Always Love You" Released: May 6, 1988; 4. "Don't Rush Me" Released: October 24, 1988

Professional ratings
Review scores
| Source | Rating |
|---|---|
| AllMusic | 4.5/5 stars |
| Number One | 4/5 stars |
| Record Mirror | 3.5/5 stars |
| The Rolling Stone Album Guide | 2.5/5 stars |

Tell It to My Heart is the debut studio album by American singer-songwriter Taylor Dayne, released on January 19, 1988, by Arista Records. Four singles were released and all of them reached the top 10 of the US Billboard Hot 100: "Tell It to My Heart" (number 7), "Prove Your Love" (number 7), "I'll Always Love You" (number 3), and "Don't Rush Me" (number 2), with the first two reaching the top 10 of the UK Singles Chart at numbers 3 and 8, respectively. The album has been certified double platinum by the Recording Industry Association of America (RIAA), denoting shipments in excess of two million copies in the United States.

== Background and reception ==
Two covers were issued for the album. The original version was photographed by Gilles Larrain and was very colorful, with Dayne resembling her appearance in the "Tell It to My Heart" music video, sporting big hair and outlandish makeup while wearing a tight black dress. The subsequent cover (which first appeared on the cover art for the single "Don't Rush Me") was photographed by Jennifer Baumann and was more subdued, showing Dayne in much more modest hair and makeup, seated against a wall while wearing a brown leather jacket and white tank top. It is likely that Arista Records reworked the album cover art to help cash in on Dayne's new-found success on the less youth-oriented Adult Contemporary chart after the release of "I'll Always Love You". Andrew Panos from Number One remarked Dayne's "belting, soaraway voice" on the album.

== Track listing ==
Tell It to My Heart track listing
| No. | Title | Writer(s) | Length |
|---|---|---|---|
| 1. | "Tell It to My Heart" | Seth Swirsky; Ernie Gold | 3:41 |
| 2. | "In the Darkness" | Billy Steinberg; Tom Kelly | 3:17 |
| 3. | "Don't Rush Me" | Alexandra Forbes; Jeff Franzel | 3:48 |
| 4. | "I'll Always Love You" | Jimmy George | 4:31 |
| 5. | "Prove Your Love" | Swirsky; Arnie Roman | 3:26 |
| 6. | "Do You Want It Right Now" | China Burton; Nick Straker | 4:03 |
| 7. | "Carry Your Heart" | Shelly Peiken | 4:22 |
| 8. | "Want Ads" | Gregg Perry; General Norman Johnson; Barney Perkins | 3:00 |
| 9. | "Where Does that Boy Hang Out" | David Lasley | 4:23 |
| 10. | "Upon the Journey's End" (duet with Billy T. Scott) | Joe Sciarrone | 4:05 |
| Total length: | | | 38:48 |

=== 2015 remastered edition ===
1. "Tell It to My Heart" – 3:41
2. "In the Darkness" – 3:17
3. "Don't Rush Me" – 3:48
4. "I'll Always Love You" – 4:31
5. "Prove Your Love" – 3:26
6. "Do You Want It Right Now" – 4:03
7. "Carry Your Heart" – 4:22
8. "Want Ads" – 3:00
9. "Where Does That Boy Hang Out" – 4:23
10. "Upon the Journey's End" (Duet with Billy T. Scott) – 4:05

Disc one – 2015 bonus tracks

1. "Willpower" (from the 1988 Summer Olympics album, One Moment in Time) – 3:50
2. "Prove Your Love" (Hot Single Mix) – 3:25
3. "I'll Always Love You" (Single Mix) – 4:19
4. "Don't Rush Me" (Hot Single Mix) – 3:51
5. "Tell It to My Heart" (Percapella Mix) – 3:22
6. "Prove Your Love" (Edited Remix) – 5:10
7. "I'll Always Love You" (Extended Version) – 6:13
8. "Don't Rush Me" (Rushapella) – 3:39
9. "Tell It to My Heart" (Instrumental) – 3:41
10. "Don't Rush Me" (Bonus Beats) – 3:39

Disc two – 2015 bonus tracks

1. "Tell It to My Heart" (Club Mix) – 6:48
2. "Prove Your Love" (Extended Remix) – 7:28
3. "Don't Rush Me" (Extended Version) – 7:19
4. "Tell It to My Heart" (House of Hearts Mix) – 8:58
5. "Prove Your Love" (House Mix) – 7:28
6. "Don't Rush Me" (Continental Clubhouse Mix) – 8:42
7. "Tell It to My Heart" (Dub Mix) – 5:48
8. "Prove Your Love" (Prove Your Dub/Beats) – 8:39
9. "Don't Rush Me" (Dub Version) – 6:08
10. "Tell It to My Heart" (Dub of Hearts Mix) – 6:51
11. "Don't Rush Me" (Continental Dubhouse Mix) – 5:38

== Personnel ==
=== Musicians ===
- Taylor Dayne – lead vocals, backing vocals
- Rich Tancredi – keyboards (1, 2, 5–10), drum programming, percussion, arrangements
- Steve Skinner – keyboards (3, 4)
- Bob Cadway – guitars
- Donald Gladstone – bass
- Ric Wake – drum programming, percussion, arrangements
- Frank Dasaro – tom overdubs, cymbal overdubs
- Richie Cannata – saxophones
- Michael Gray – additional backing vocals
- Shelly Peiken – additional backing vocals
- Billy T. Scott – additional backing vocals
- Casey Warner – additional backing vocals

=== Technical ===
- Ric Wake – producer, recording (1)
- Bob Cadway – recording, mixing (1, 3, 4, 7–10)
- Clay Hutchinson – additional vocal engineering
- John Herman – assistant engineer
- Dave O'Donnell – assistant engineer
- Don Rodenback – assistant engineer
- Mario Vasquez – assistant engineer
- Thomas R. Yezzi – assistant engineer
- Jason Corsaro – mixing (2, 6)
- Michael Hutchinson – mixing (5)
- Margery Greenspan – art direction
- Gilles Larrain – photography (original 1987 cover)
- Jennifer Baumann – photography (revamped 1988 cover)

== Charts ==
=== Weekly charts ===
Weekly chart performance for Tell It to My Heart
| Chart (1988) | Peak position |
|---|---|
| Australian Albums (Kent Music Report) | 53 |
| Austrian Albums (Ö3 Austria) | 19 |
| Canada Top Albums/CDs (RPM) | 47 |
| Dutch Albums (Album Top 100) | 27 |
| European Albums (Music & Media) | 23 |
| Finnish Albums (Suomen virallinen lista) | 9 |
| German Albums (Offizielle Top 100) | 11 |
| New Zealand Albums (RMNZ) | 37 |
| Norwegian Albums (VG-lista) | 17 |
| Swedish Albums (Sverigetopplistan) | 15 |
| Swiss Albums (Schweizer Hitparade) | 4 |
| UK Albums (Official Charts) | 24 |
| US Billboard 200 | 21 |
| US Top R&B/Hip-Hop Albums (Billboard) | 27 |

=== Year-end charts ===
1988 year-end chart performance for Tell It to My Heart
| Chart (1988) | Position |
|---|---|
| European Albums (Music & Media) | 77 |
| German Albums (Offizielle Top 100) | 49 |
| US Billboard 200 | 41 |
| US Top R&B/Hip-Hop Albums (Billboard) | 83 |

1989 year-end chart performance for Tell It to My Heart
| Chart (1989) | Position |
|---|---|
| US Billboard 200 | 64 |

== Certifications ==
Certifications for Tell It to My Heart
| Region | Certification | Certified units/sales |
|---|---|---|
| Canada (Music Canada) | Gold | 50,000^{^} |
| Spain (Promusicae) | Platinum | 100,000^{^} |
| United States (RIAA) | 2× Platinum | 2,000,000^{^} |
^{^} Shipments figures based on certification alone.
