= Prove Your Love =

1988 single by Taylor Dayne

Single by Taylor Dayne

from the album Tell It to My Heart
- B-side: "Upon the Journey's End"
- Released: February 8, 1988
- Genre: Freestyle
- Length: 3:25
- Label: Arista
- Songwriter(s): Seth Swirsky; Arnie Roman
- Producer(s): Ric Wake

Taylor Dayne singles chronology
"Tell It to My Heart" (1987)	"Prove Your Love" (1988)	"I'll Always Love You" (1988)

Music video
- "Prove Your Love" on YouTube

"Prove Your Love" is a song by American singer Taylor Dayne for her debut studio album, Tell It to My Heart (1988). Written by Seth Swirsky and Arnie Roman, and produced by Ric Wake, the song was released on February 8, 1988, as the album's second single, by Arista Records. The single was Dayne's second top-10 hit on the US Billboard Hot 100 chart, where it peaked at number seven. It also appeared on the Billboard Dance Club Play chart, where it became Dayne's first number-one hit on that chart. Furthermore, the single was a hit overseas, reaching number one in Switzerland, number four in West Germany, and number eight in the United Kingdom.

== Critical reception ==
Paul Oldfield from Melody Maker wrote, "Taylor Dayne comes up with the most impatient single this week. The awesome outlines of Rufus and Chaka Khan's "Ain't Nobody" have been filled in with designer purposefulnes by Arthur Baker-type chatter and grafted crashes and shunts of guitar. "Prove Your Love" is all appetite, avarice and accountancy, trying to overtake its own expectations. Look for the sell-by-date." Andrew Panos from Number One complimented "Prove Your Love" as "a thumpingly catchy disco tune".

== Track listing and formats ==
- 7-inch single
1. "Prove Your Love" – 3:25
2. "Upon the Journey's End" – 4:03
- US 12-inch maxi
1. "Prove Your Love" (extended remix) – 7:27
2. "Prove Your Love" (Hot Single mix) – 3:25
3. "Prove Your Love" (edited remix) – 4:32
4. "Prove Your Love" (Prove Your Dub/Beats mix) – 8:30
- UK 12-inch maxi
1. "Prove Your Love" (extended remix) – 7:27
2. "Prove Your Love" (Prove Your Dub/Beats mix) – 8:30
3. "Upon the Journey's End" – 4:03
- Alternate UK 12-inch maxi
1. "Prove Your Love" (House mix) – 7:24
2. "Tell It to My Heart" (House of Hearts mix) – 8:34
3. "Upon the Journey's End" – 4:03

== Charts ==
=== Weekly charts ===
Weekly chart performance for "Prove Your Love"
Chart (1988–1989)	Peak position
Australia (ARIA)	30
Austria (Ö3 Austria Top 40)	11
Belgium (Ultratop 50 Flanders)	5
Europe (Eurochart Hot 100 Singles)	7
Finland (Suomen virallinen lista)	7
Ireland (IRMA)	6
Netherlands (Dutch Top 40)	6
Netherlands (Single Top 100)	8
New Zealand (Recorded Music NZ)	32
Sweden (Sverigetopplistan)	10
Switzerland (Schweizer Hitparade)	2
UK Singles (OCC)	8
US Billboard Hot 100	7
US Dance Club Songs (Billboard)	1
US Dance Singles Sales (Billboard)	10
US Cash Box Top 100	7
West Germany (GfK)	4

=== Year-end charts ===
Year-end chart performance for "Prove Your Love"
Chart (1988)	Position
Belgium (Ultratop)	40
Europe (Eurochart Hot 100 Singles)	75
Netherlands (Dutch Top 40)	66
Netherlands (Single Top 100)	52
US Billboard Hot 100	100
US Dance Club Play (Billboard)	14
West Germany (Media Control)	61
