= With Every Beat of My Heart =

- CD single cover

Single by Taylor Dayne

from the album Can't Fight Fate
- B-side: "All I Ever Wanted"
- Released: October 10, 1989
- Genre: Dance-pop
- Length: 4:22
- Label: Arista
- Songwriters: Tommy Faragher; Lotti Golden; Arthur Baker
- Producer: Ric Wake

Taylor Dayne singles chronology
"Don't Rush Me" (1988)	"With Every Beat of My Heart" (1989)	"Love Will Lead You Back" (1990)

Music video
- "Taylor Dayne - With Every Beat Of My Heart" on YouTube

Music video
- "Taylor Dayne - With Every Beat Of My Heart (Make It Rock Remix)" on YouTube

"With Every Beat of My Heart" is a song recorded by American singer Taylor Dayne for her second studio album, Can't Fight Fate (1989), which reached the Top 5 position on the Billboard Hot 100. Released on October 10, 1989, the song written by Lotti Golden, Tommy Faragher and Arthur Baker, and produced by Ric Wake, was the lead single, kicking off Dayne’s Arista Records debut LP, Can't Fight Fate.

"With Every Beat of My Heart" became Dayne's fifth consecutive top-ten single in the United States, reaching number five on the Billboard Hot 100 in December 1989. It also peaked at number five in Canada and number 53 in the United Kingdom.

== Chart performance ==
"With Every Beat of My Heart" was a US Top 5 Billboard Hot 100 hit, reaching #5 in its ninth week in the Billboard issue dated December 16, 1989. It remained at its peak position for four weeks and spent 18 weeks on the chart, after debuting at #61. It also reached the top-ten on the Billboard Dance Club Songs chart. On the Billboard Year-End Hot 100 singles of 1990, the single ranked at number 48.

== Critical reception ==
David Giles from Music Week wrote, "Having made some of the best dance-pop singles of 1989, Dayne returns with a raunchier, more bluesy soul number which suggests that she is aiming at a Tina Turner-style profile. The song isn't immediate enough for massive success but its singer is evidently here to stay."

== Charts ==
=== Weekly charts ===
Chart (1989–1990)	Peak position
Australia (Kent Music Report)	67
Canada Top Singles (RPM)	5
Italy Airplay (Music & Media)	6
Switzerland (Schweizer Hitparade)	18
UK Singles (Official Charts)	53
US Billboard Hot 100	5
US Adult Contemporary (Billboard)	22
US Dance Club Songs (Billboard)	8
US Dance Singles Sales (Billboard)	21

=== Year-end charts ===
Chart (1990)	Position
Canada Top Singles (RPM)	84
US Billboard Hot 100	48
