= Satisfied (Taylor Dayne album) =

Studio album by Taylor Dayne
- Released: February 5, 2008
- Recorded: 2006–2007
- Genres: Dance-pop; pop rock; soul
- Length: 48:03
- Label: Adrenaline
- Producers: Taylor Dayne (executive), Richie Jones (tracks 1, 2), Hitesh Ceon (co-producer; track 1), R-Rated (track 3), Peter Wade Keusch (tracks 4, 7), Mike Mangini (tracks 5, 9, 11, 12), James Poyser (tracks 6, 8), Brent Paschke (track 8, co-producer; track 6), John Hill (co-producer; track 7), Zukhan Bey (track 8), Julio Reyes Capello (tracks 10, 12)

Taylor Dayne chronology
Naked Without You (1998)	Satisfied (2008)

Singles from Satisfied
- 1. "Beautiful" Released: December 11, 2007; 2. "My Heart Can't Change" Released: 2008; 3. "Crash" Released: 2008

Satisfied is the fifth studio album by American singer-songwriter Taylor Dayne, released in 2007 by Adrenaline Records. The album peaked at No. 22 on the US Billboard Independent Albums chart.

== Background ==
Dane executively produced the album alongside the likes of Mike Mangini and James Poyser. Satisfied marked Dayne's first album in ten years as well as her latest album to date. Dane also covered 3 songs on the album, including Red Hot Chili Peppers' Under the Bridge.

== Singles ==
A song from the album, called "Beautiful", was released as a single. Beautiful got to No. 1 on the US Billboard Dance Club Songs charts. What's more, the song peaked at No. 23 on the US Billboard Adult Contemporary Songs charts.

== Appearances in Other Media ==
"Crash" was used in a promotional commercial for the ABC network.

== Critical reception ==
Professional ratings
Review scores
Source	Rating
AllMusic	3.5/5 stars
Slant Magazine	2.5/5 stars

Stephen Thomas Erlewine of AllMusic praised the album saying, "There's no denying that Taylor Dayne sounds older on Satisfied, her first album in a decade -- that maturity is especially apparent as her music remains tied to her late-'80s heyday, as it's almost all big, bright productions that sound more 1988 than 2008. As it turns out, that evident maturity winds up benefiting Dayne tremendously: by not chasing trends, she sounds as if she's deepening emotionally but, more to the point, she no longer oversings. There is a warm, rounded, tonal quality to her voice, a quality that is especially welcome as she often could sound too harsh and brassy on her '80s hits. Here, she's settled down and so have the songs; they're undeniably retro dance-pop and that retro element gives them a smooth, easy feel." While Sal Cinquemani of Slant, Slant Magazine remarked "It’s been 10 years since Taylor Dayne’s last album and 15 since her last pop hit, but that voice remains unmistakable, and it’s possibly never been in finer form. Despite that and the top-notch production values of Dayne’s independently-released new album, however, Satisfied relies too heavily on middle-of-the-road mid-tempo numbers".

== Track listing ==
No.	Title	Writer(s)	Length
1.	"Beautiful"	Taylor Dayne, Helgi M. Hubner	3:49
2.	"I'm Over My Head"	Josh Alexander, Billy Steinberg	3:15
3.	"My Heart Can't Change"	Gregg Alexander, Rick Nowels	3:45
4.	"She Don't Love You"	Teron Beal, Peter Wade Keusch, Jayms Madison	4:06
5.	"Under the Bridge"	Flea, John Frusciante, Anthony Kiedis, Chad Smith	4:03
6.	"Satisfied"	Mike Mondesir, Andrew Lewis Taylor	4:19
7.	"Dedicated"	John Graham Hill, Keusch, Stephanie McKay	3:51
8.	"Kissing You"	Tim Atack, Des'ree	4:09
9.	"Crash"	Jack David Elliot, Janice Robinson	4:33
10.	"The Fall"	Luigie Gonzalez, Dayne, Margie Hauser	3:42
11.	"Love Chain"	Brown, Dayne, Sebastian Nylund	3:52
12.	"Fool to Cry"	Mick Jagger, Keith Richards	3:33
13.	"Hymn"	Dayne, Luigie Gonzalez	3:10
