= Can't Get Enough of Your Love, Babe =

1974 single by Barry White

Single by Barry White

from the album Can't Get Enough
- B-side: "Just Not Enough"
- Released: June 28, 1974
- Genre: Philadelphia soul; proto-disco
- Length: 4:31 (album version); 3:28 (single version)
- Label: Philips; 20th Century Fox
- Songwriter: Barry White
- Producer: Barry White

Barry White singles chronology
| "Honey Please, Can't Ya See" (1974) | "Can't Get Enough of Your Love, Babe" (1974) | "You're the First, the Last, My Everything" (1974) |

Audio sample
- file; help

"Can't Get Enough of Your Love, Babe" is a song written, recorded, and produced by American musician Barry White. Released in June 1974 as the first single from his third album, Can't Get Enough (1974), the song topped the US Billboard Hot 100 and Billboard R&B charts. It became one of White's signature tunes and achieved gold record status in the US. It was also his second American chart-topper, after "Love's Theme", and his first as a solo act.

The record begins with White speaking the first few lines over the intro music, "I've heard people say that too much of anything is no good for you, Baby. But I don't know about that." White performed this song live on two TV shows: The Midnight Special in 1974, and on Soul Train on May 24, 1975.

== Charts ==
=== Weekly charts ===
| Chart (1974) | Peak position |
|---|---|
| Australia (Kent Music Report) | 23 |
| Belgium (Ultratop 50 Flanders) | 17 |
| Belgium (Ultratop 50 Wallonia) | 19 |
| Canada Top Singles (RPM) | 5 |
| Netherlands (Dutch Top 40) | 13 |
| Netherlands (Single Top 100) | 12 |
| South Africa (Springbok Radio) | 12 |
| UK Singles (Official Charts) | 8 |
| US Billboard Hot 100 | 1 |
| US Adult Contemporary (Billboard) | 26 |
| US Hot Soul Singles (Billboard) | 1 |
| US Cash Box Top 100 | 1 |

| Chart (1999) | Peak position |
|---|---|
| France (SNEP) | 57 |

=== Year-end charts ===
| Chart (1974) | Position |
|---|---|
| Canada Top Singles (RPM) | 42 |
| US Cash Box Top 100 | 56 |

== Certifications ==
| Region | Certification | Certified units/sales |
|---|---|---|
| Spain (Promusicae) | Gold | 30,000^{‡} |
| United Kingdom (BPI) | Gold | 400,000^{‡} |
| United States (RIAA) | Gold | 1,000,000^{^} |
^{^} Shipments figures based on certification alone.^{‡} Sales+streaming figures based on certification alone.

== Taylor Dayne version ==
"Can't Get Enough of Your Love"
- CD single cover

Single by Taylor Dayne

from the album Soul Dancing
- B-side: "Let's Spend the Night Together"
- Released: May 1993
- Genre: Dance-pop; house
- Length: 4:25
- Label: Arista
- Songwriter: Barry White
- Producers: David Cole; Robert Clivillés

Taylor Dayne singles chronology
| "Heart of Stone" (1990) | "Can't Get Enough of Your Love" (1993) | "Send Me a Lover" (1993) |

Music video
- "Can't Get Enough of Your Love" on YouTube

In 1993, the song was covered by American singer, songwriter, and actress Taylor Dayne as "Can't Get Enough of Your Love". When Dayne submitted her planned third album to Arista Records, label president Clive Davis strongly suggested that she remake the Barry White classic to serve as the album's lead single (replacing Dayne's choice, the self-penned "I'll Wait" which was the planned title cut; the album's title was amended to Soul Dancing).

Produced by David Cole and Robert Clivillés of C+C Music Factory, Dayne's "Can't Get Enough of Your Love" became a US dance club hit, peaking at number two on the Billboard Hot Dance Club Songs chart. However, the track evinced a sharp drop in Dayne's profile on the Billboard Hot 100 with a number 20 peak; Dayne's first seven singles had all reached the top 10 but her eighth single, "Heart of Stone", peaked at number 12. "Can't Get Enough of Your Love" was her final top 40 hit with the follow-up single, "Send Me a Lover", being her last Hot 100 entry. The song also reached number 14 on the US Cash Box Top 100.

The track had more impact for Dayne internationally. In Australia, it spent three weeks at number two in August 1993 and was the 19th-best-selling single of 1993, receiving a Platinum certification for sales of at least 70,000 copies. The song also reached number eight in Canada, where it was the 67th-best-selling single of the year. Elsewhere, the song reached the top 20 in Belgium, Iceland, Ireland, the Netherlands, Switzerland, and the United Kingdom.

=== Critical reception ===
Jose F. Promis from AllMusic complimented Dayne's cover version as "excellent" and "dance-lite". Larry Flick from Billboard magazine wrote, "Long-absent pop dynamo takes a page from Barry White's book of R&B/disco classics, and gives it a faithful reading. Her boisterous delivery occasionally overpowers the instrumentation, though she is ultimately quite effective in conjuring up feelings of nostalgia." Dave Obee from Calgary Herald remarked that "she even makes a Barry White song sound masculine." Troy J. Augusto from Cash Box described it as a "bouncy cut that recalls, of all things, '70s disco but does so with enough of the singer's powerful presence to cancel the questionable musical vibe." He added that the song's approach "is lighter than writer Barry White's original, orchestrated version but strong delivery from Dayne makes up for lack of depth otherwise apparent in this read of tune." An uncredited review from Pan-European magazine Music & Media reviewed it favorably saying, Long time no see, but now she rolls out of the C&C Factory for a pop/dance rendition of the Barry White classic. You can't get more sensual than this."

Nick Krewen from The Hamilton Spectator said her remake "is strong enough to claim ownership". Connie Johnson from the Los Angeles Times felt that here, Dayne "does her one better, with a campy, deluxe version" of White's song. In his weekly UK chart commentary, James Masterton wrote, that "summery soul being the order of the day and may well give her her first Top 20 hit for 5 years." James Hamilton from Music Week's RM Dance Update viewed it as "soulful". Mike Joyce from The Washington Post found that Dayne's update of the disco classic "proves disarming."

=== Music video ===
A music video was produced to promote the single, directed by Randee St. Nicholas, featuring Dayne performing in the middle of a dancing crowd of people. The video was later made available on Dayne's official YouTube channel in 2009, and had generated almost six million views as of early 2024.

=== Track listing ===
1. "Can't Get Enough of Your Love" (album version) – 4:25
2. "Can't Get Enough of Your Love" (C+C extended club mix I) – 6:05
3. "Can't Get Enough of Your Love" (C+C extended club mix II) – 6:46
4. "Can't Get Enough of Your Love" (C+C special edition mix) – 6:12
5. "Let's Spend the Night Together" – 5:35

=== Charts ===
==== Weekly charts ====
| Chart (1993) | Peak position |
|---|---|
| Australia (ARIA) | 2 |
| Austria (Ö3 Austria Top 40) | 29 |
| Belgium (Ultratop 50 Flanders) | 6 |
| Canada Top Singles (RPM) | 8 |
| Canada Adult Contemporary (RPM) | 6 |
| Canada Dance/Urban (RPM) | 8 |
| Europe (Eurochart Hot 100) | 32 |
| Europe (European AC Radio) | 19 |
| Europe (European Hit Radio) | 10 |
| Germany (GfK) | 56 |
| Iceland (Íslenski Listinn Topp 40) | 8 |
| Ireland (IRMA) | 19 |
| Netherlands (Dutch Top 40) | 8 |
| Netherlands (Single Top 100) | 9 |
| New Zealand (Recorded Music NZ) | 25 |
| Sweden (Sverigetopplistan) | 34 |
| Switzerland (Schweizer Hitparade) | 17 |
| UK Singles (Official Charts) | 14 |
| UK Airplay (Music Week) | 14 |
| UK Dance (Music Week) | 4 |
| UK Club Chart (Music Week) | 1 |
| US Billboard Hot 100 | 20 |
| US Adult Contemporary (Billboard) | 15 |
| US Dance Club Songs (Billboard) | 2 |
| US Dance Singles Sales (Billboard) | 1 |
| US Pop Airplay (Billboard) | 8 |
| US Cash Box Top 100 | 14 |
| US Adult Contemporary (Gavin Report) | 10 |
| US Top 40 (Gavin Report) | 2 |
| US Adult Contemporary (Radio & Records) | 12 |
| US Contemporary Hit Radio (Radio & Records) | 5 |

==== Year-end charts ====
| Chart (1993) | Position |
|---|---|
| Australia (ARIA) | 19 |
| Belgium (Ultratop) | 40 |
| Canada Top Singles (RPM) | 67 |
| Canada Adult Contemporary (RPM) | 51 |
| Europe (European Hit Radio) | 37 |
| Iceland (Íslenski Listinn Topp 40) | 48 |
| Netherlands (Dutch Top 40) | 64 |
| UK Club Chart (Music Week) | 70 |
| US Billboard Hot 100 | 99 |
| US Dance Club Play (Billboard) | 9 |
| US Adult Contemporary (Radio & Records) | 74 |
| US Contemporary Hit Radio (Radio & Records) | 59 |

=== Certifications ===
| Region | Certification | Certified units/sales |
|---|---|---|
| Australia (ARIA) | Platinum | 70,000^{^} |
^{^} Shipments figures based on certification alone.

=== Release history ===
| Region | Date | Format(s) | Label(s) | Ref. |
|---|---|---|---|---|
| United States | May 1993 | 7-inch vinyl; 12-inch vinyl; CD; cassette | Arista | |
| Australia | May 30, 1993 | CD1; cassette | Arista | |
| United Kingdom | June 21, 1993 | 7-inch vinyl; 12-inch vinyl; CD; cassette | Arista | |
| Australia | June 28, 1993 | CD2 | Arista | |
| Japan | August 4, 1993 | Mini-CD | Arista | |

== Other versions ==
- In 1983, the song was covered by Big Tony. It was a big hit in several European countries.
