= Love Will Lead You Back =

1990 single by Taylor Dayne

- CD single cover

Single by Taylor Dayne

from the album Can't Fight Fate
- B-side: "You Meant the World to Me"
- Released: January 12, 1990
- Genre: Pop
- Length: 4:38
- Label: Arista
- Songwriter: Diane Warren
- Producer: Ric Wake

Taylor Dayne singles chronology
"With Every Beat of My Heart" (1989)	"Love Will Lead You Back" (1990)	"I'll Be Your Shelter" (1990)

Alternative cover

Music video
- "Love Will Lead You Back" on YouTube

"Love Will Lead You Back" is a song recorded by American singer Taylor Dayne for her second studio album, Can't Fight Fate (1989). Written by Diane Warren and produced by Ric Wake, the song was released on January 12, 1990, by Arista Records as the second single from the album.

"Love Will Lead You Back" reached number one on the US Billboard Hot 100 in April 1990 and spent 15 weeks in the top 40, becoming Dayne's sole chart-topping hit in the US. It also reached number one on the Billboard Adult Contemporary chart and was certified gold by the Recording Industry Association of America (RIAA). In addition to its US success, the song peaked at number two in Canada, number 11 in Australia, and number 28 in New Zealand.

== Background ==
The song, written by American songwriter Diane Warren, is about a woman who is willing to set her lover free because she is confident that one day his love will lead him back to her; "Sometimes it takes some time out on your own now / to find your way back home". Warren has stated that she began writing the song while in a hotel in Russia and that she had Whitney Houston in mind to record it, but Arista Records president Clive Davis wanted to let Dayne record the song.

== Critical reception ==
Matthew Hocter from Albumism stated that "Love Will Lead You Back" is "going on to be one of Dayne's most synonymous songs", noting "the phenomenal balladry" the singer delivered on the song. Jose F. Promis from AllMusic described it as a "lush and dramatic" ballad. David Giles from Music Week wrote, "Something of a change in style for Taylor Dayne, this track from her current album is a big ballad in the Lionel Richie tradition and recently a US chart topper — so expect that success to be repeated over here." A reviewer from People Magazine noted that the singer can "dig for depth and rich tone on such ballads as Warren's "Love Will Lead You Back"."

== Music video ==
The accompanying music video for "Love Will Lead You Back" was very simple. Directed by English director Nigel Dick, it shows Dayne and her band in a studio performing the song. The music video was released both in black-and-white and sepia tones. In the music video, Dayne holds in her hand what seems to be the lyrics of the song, or possibly a letter from her lover.

== Personnel ==
- Taylor Dayne – lead vocals
- Bob Cadway – guitars
- Rich Tancredi – keyboards, arrangements
- Joey Franco – drums
- Jamillah Muhammad, Ricky Nelson, Billy T. Scott – backing vocals

== Charts ==
=== Weekly charts ===
Chart (1990)	Peak position
Australia (ARIA)	11
Canada Top Singles (RPM)	2
Canada Adult Contemporary (RPM)	2
New Zealand (Recorded Music NZ)	28
UK Singles (Official Charts)	69
US Billboard Hot 100	1
US Adult Contemporary (Billboard)	1
US Cash Box Top 100	1

=== Year-end charts ===
Chart (1990)	Position
Australia (ARIA)	32
Canada Top Singles (RPM)	28
Canada Adult Contemporary (RPM)	21
US Billboard Hot 100	28
US Adult Contemporary (Billboard)	7
US Cash Box Top 100	44

== Certifications ==
Region	Certification	Certified units/sales
Australia (ARIA)	Gold	35,000^{^}
United States (RIAA)	Gold	500,000^{^}
^{^} Shipments figures based on certification alone.

== Release history ==
Region	Date	Format(s)	Label(s)	Ref.
United States	January 12, 1990	7-inch vinyl; cassette	Arista	
Japan	March 7, 1990	Mini-CD	Arista	
Australia	March 26, 1990	7-inch vinyl; cassette	Arista	
United Kingdom	July 16, 1990	7-inch vinyl; 12-inch vinyl; CD	Arista	

== Covers ==
The song was covered by Brazilian singer Sandra de Sá, Filipina singers Kyla, Nina and Marika Sasaki, Filipino crooner Jun Polistico and Australian pop group Young Divas. Mexican showgirl Yuri recorded a Spanish-language adaptation of the song as "Quién eres tú" on her studio album Soy Libre (1991). Yuri's version peaked at number eight on the Billboard Hot Latin Songs chart in the US.

== See also ==
- List of Billboard Hot 100 number-one singles of 1990
- List of number-one adult contemporary singles of 1990 (U.S.)
