= Taylor Dayne =

American singer (born 1962)

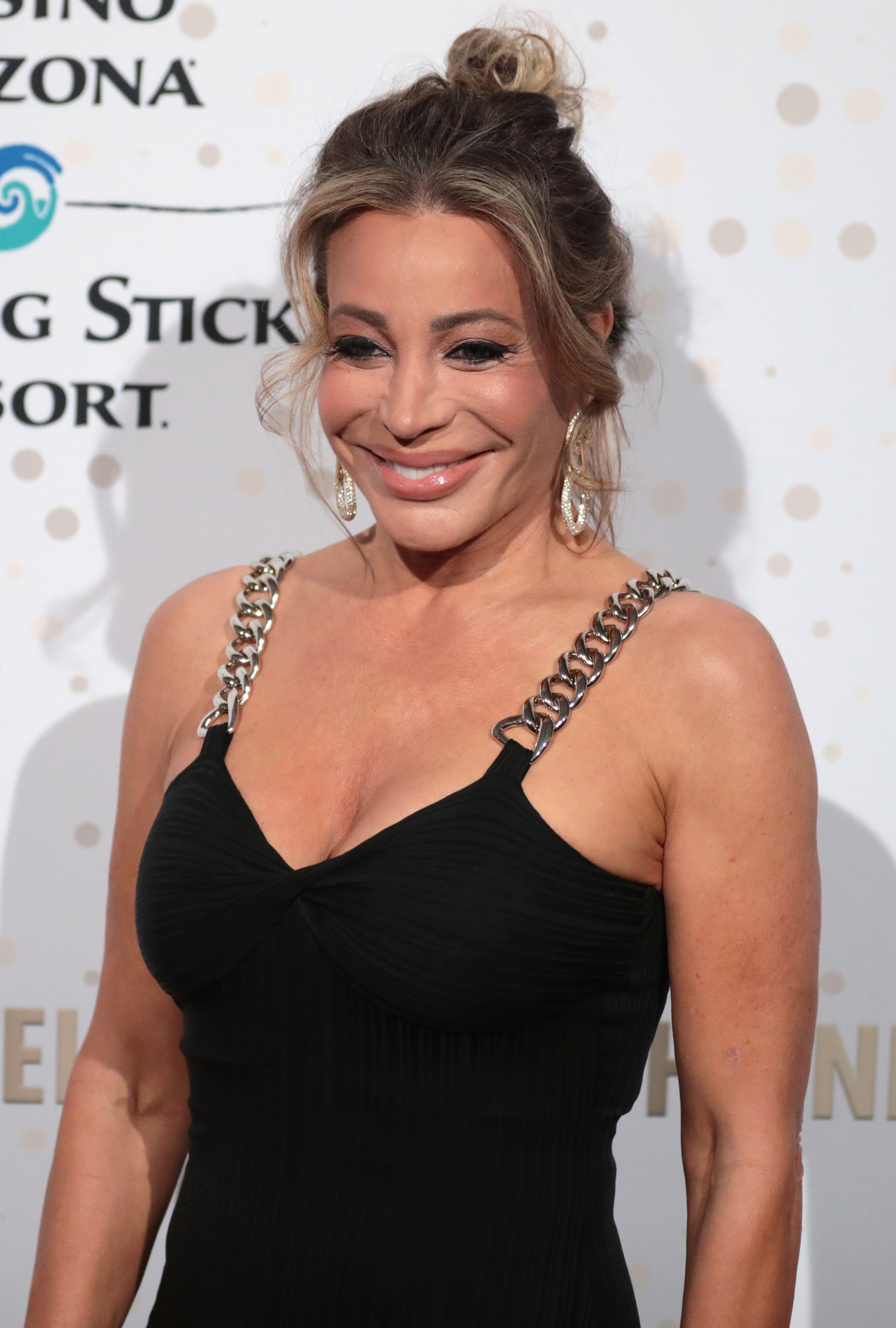
- Dayne in 2023

Background information
- Born: Leslie Wunderman; March 7, 1962 (age 64); New York City, U.S.
- Genres: Pop; dance-pop; freestyle; adult contemporary; blue-eyed soul
- Occupation: Singer
- Works: Taylor Dayne discography
- Years active: 1983–present
- Labels: Mega Bolt; Arista; BMG; Neptune; River North; Intention
- Website: taylordayne.com

Taylor Dayne (born Leslie Wunderman; March 7, 1962) is an American singer who rose to fame after her first two albums (Tell It to My Heart and Can't Fight Fate) were both certified 2× Platinum by the Recording Industry Association of America (RIAA). Dayne achieved seven US Top 10 singles, including "Tell It to My Heart", "Prove Your Love", "I'll Always Love You", "Don't Rush Me", "With Every Beat of My Heart", "Love Will Lead You Back", and "I'll Be Your Shelter". Dayne also scored the US Top 20 hits "Heart of Stone" and "Can't Get Enough of Your Love". In the United States, she achieved three gold singles and has sold over 75 million albums and singles worldwide. Dayne has received two Grammy Award nominations, an American Music Award and multiple New York Music Awards. She has also been ranked by both Rolling Stone and Billboard on their lists of the most successful dance artists of all time.

== Life and career ==
=== Early life ===
Dayne, whose birth name is Leslie Wunderman, was born in Manhattan, New York City, and lived briefly in another borough, The Bronx, until her family moved to Long Island when she was two years old. She began singing professionally after graduating from high school in Baldwin, Nassau County, New York, performing in little-known rock bands such as Felony and Next. She began singing solo after finishing college and, under the name "Les Lee", recorded two dance singles, "I'm The One You Want" (1985) and "Tell Me Can You Love Me" (1986), which were released on the New York independent label Mega Bolt.

=== Success ===
Signed to Arista Records under the stage name "Taylor Dayne", her first song to crack the US Top 10 (No. 7) was the dance-pop hit "Tell It to My Heart" which was released on July 24, 1987. The song (written by Seth Swirsky) reached Dayne when she contacted Chappell Music and asked to be sent some demos which had been overlooked, although the song had been recorded in early 1987 by Louisa Florio for a self-titled Canadian album release. Dayne recalled feeling an immediate affinity with the song: "I thought there was something about the hook – it's a happy hook." The track was recorded at Cove City Sound Studios in Glen Cove, Long Island. Dayne's father loaned her $6,000 to create the demo.

The song was an instant success worldwide, peaking in the Top 5 of most major markets worldwide, and reaching No. 1 in many countries; the 12-inch record of the song ended up selling 900,000 copies alone. Dayne was nominated for a Grammy Award for Best Pop Vocal, Female for her performance on "Tell It to My Heart" in 1988. Producer Ric Wake said in a 1994 interview with Vibe magazine that "Tell It to My Heart" "really blew people away". Commenting on Dayne's voice he said "They thought she was, like, black or some kind of ethnic ...".

In 2023, Time Out ranked "Tell It to My Heart" in their "The 100 Best Party Songs Ever Made", writing, "The Long Island native born Leslie Wunderman sounds positively voracious on her 1987 signature hit. Few dance-pop classics feel more urgent or fierce than 'Tell It to My Heart'; you can see that Dayne's been waiting her whole life to belt out lines like 'Body to body / Soul to soul / Always feel you near.' The lyrics might read like bad student poetry, but blend them with unabashedly hammy '80s synths and a so-passionate-it's-a-little-scary delivery, and the result is a sonic Roman candle, blasting fireballs of fun onto the dance floor." That same year, Rolling Stone ranked it in their "The 200 Best '80s Songs".

Swirsky also co-wrote Dayne's follow-up single "Prove Your Love". The single was Dayne's second Top 10 hit on the US Billboard Hot 100 chart, where it peaked at No. 7. The single spent eleven weeks in the Top 40. It also appeared on the Dance Club Songs chart, where it became Dayne's first No. 1 hit on that chart on April 23, 1988. Furthermore, the single was a hit overseas, going to No. 1 in Switzerland and No. 8 on the UK Singles chart. Andrew Panos from Number One complimented "Prove Your Love" as "a thumpingly catchy disco tune".

On January 19, 1988, Arista Records released Dayne's debut album Tell It to My Heart. Two further singles were released and they also reached the Top 10 of the US Billboard Hot 100: "I'll Always Love You" (No. 3), and "Don't Rush Me" (No. 2). The album has been certified double platinum by the Recording Industry Association of America (RIAA), denoting shipments in excess of two million copies in the United States. Dayne was nominated for a Grammy Award for Best Female R&B Vocal for her performance on "I'll Always Love You" in 1989. The song was also nominated for Best R&B Song that year. Andrew Panos from Number One commended Dayne's "belting, soaraway voice" on the album.

Dayne's second studio album Can't Fight Fate was released on October 31, 1989, by Arista Records. It continued her chart success and was certified 2× Platinum by the Recording Industry Association of America (RIAA). It includes the Billboard Hot 100 hit singles "With Every Beat of My Heart" (No. 5), "I'll Be Your Shelter" (No. 4), "Love Will Lead You Back" (No. 1) and "Heart of Stone" (No. 12). AllMusic editor Jose Promis retrospectively concluded, "Years after its release, this album stands the test of time, and can safely be classified as one of the more diverse and exciting dance/pop/rock albums of the late '80s/early '90s."

"I'll Always Love You", a change-of-pace ballad compared to Dayne's earlier releases, was her breakout hit on the Adult Contemporary charts in 1988 and paved the way for future uptempo dance tracks such as "Don't Rush Me" (1988) and "With Every Beat Of My Heart" (1989) to gain acceptance on Adult Contemporary radio. In 1990, "Love Will Lead You Back", a Diane Warren composition, peaked at No. 1 on both the Billboard Hot 100 and the Hot Adult Contemporary Tracks chart. Matthew Hocter from Albumism stated that "Love Will Lead You Back" is "going on to be one of Dayne's most synonymous songs", noting "the phenomenal balladry" the singer delivered on the song.

Dayne went on to release two more albums (Soul Dancing and Naked Without You) in the 1990s, but had only one more US Top 40 hit, her 1993 cover of Barry White's 1974 hit "Can't Get Enough of Your Love" (from her 1993 album Soul Dancing), which reached No. 2 in the ARIA Charts in Australia but only No. 20 in the US. The song also reached the Top 20 in Belgium, Iceland, Ireland, the Netherlands, Switzerland, and the United Kingdom. In Australia, it was the 19th-best-selling single of 1993, receiving a Platinum certification for sales of at least 70,000 copies. Jose Promis from AllMusic called Dayne's cover version as "excellent" and "dance-lite". Greg Sandow from Entertainment Weekly complimented Soul Dancing as a "killer pop album". He added, "Can’t fault her choice of material; these are crisp, focused, hook-filled pop songs, every one of them a likely radio hit." Together with Arthur Baker and Fred Zarr, Dayne wrote "Whatever You Want" for Tina Turner's 1996 album Wildest Dreams. Dayne later recorded and released the song herself in 1998 as a single from her album Naked Without You.

=== Later career ===
As an actress, Dayne appeared in the 1997 sci-fi television series Nightman as Carla Day. She has had roles in independent films such as Fool's Paradise (1997), Stag (also in 1997) and Jesus the Driver (2004), as well as the Warren Beatty-produced 1994 remake of Love Affair. Dayne also had a recurring role on the Showtime series Rude Awakening. Dayne has performed alongside Marc Bonilla and Dragonchoir. She performed on Broadway in Elton John's Aida in 2001. In 2005, Dayne was featured in the VH1 series Remaking, which featured her close friends Leah Remini and Michelle Reid. The series documents Dayne's return to music after taking time off to have a family (she has twins via a surrogate mother), and premiered her newest song, "Right Now", a result of her collaboration with Rodney Jerkins.

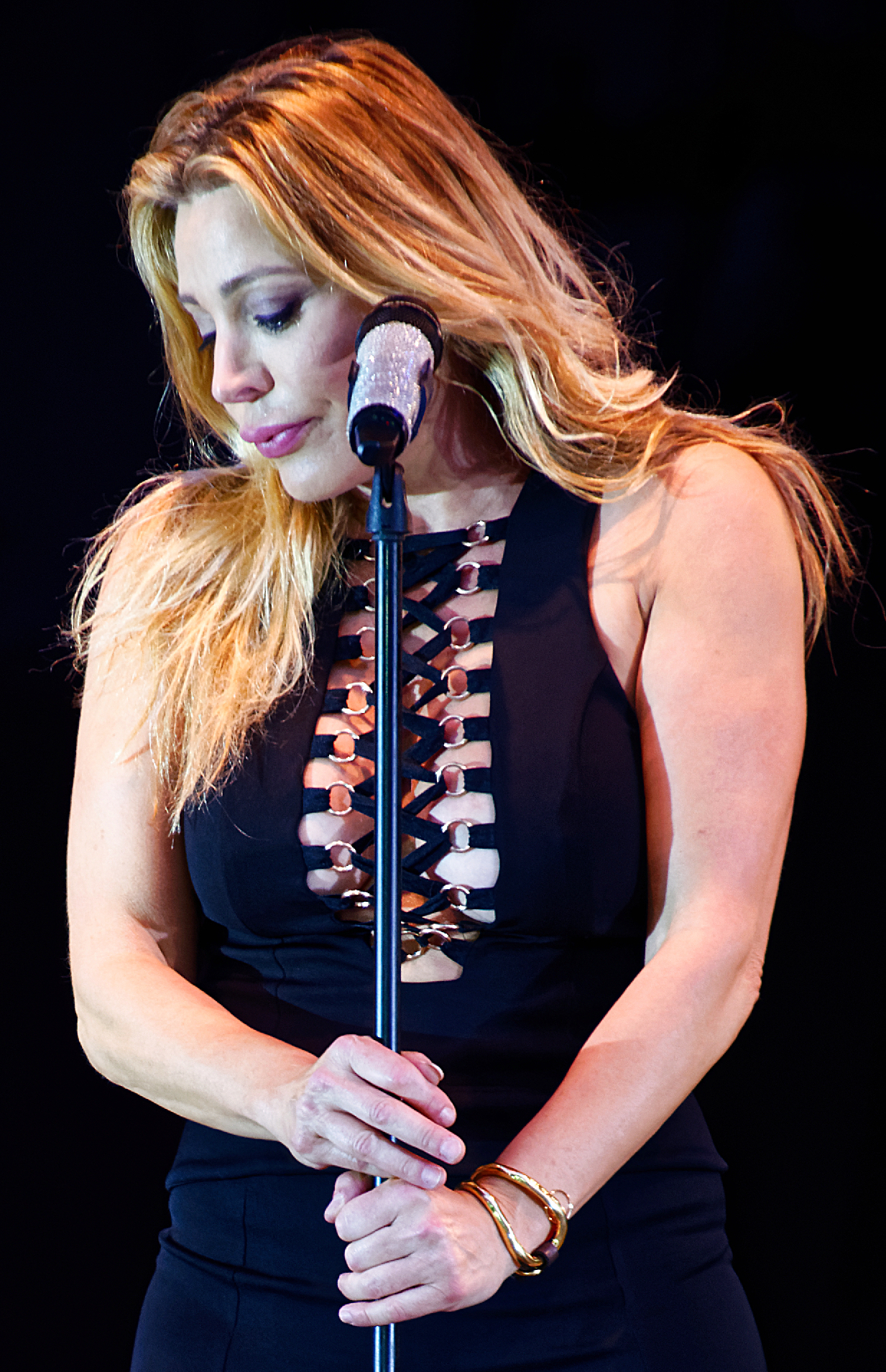
Dayne performing in 2016

On December 11, 2007, Dayne released the first single, "Beautiful", from her studio album Satisfied. The song was written by Dayne and Hitesh Ceon of production team 3Elementz. Dayne promoted it on many radio stations, including New York's WKTU. "Beautiful" went to No. 1 on the Billboard Dance Charts. She also appeared on The Today Show, Chelsea Lately, Wake Up With Whoopi and VH1. The music video for the single and the Satisfied album cover were shot by Tony Duran, who has also shot album covers for Justin Timberlake and Jennifer Lopez. Dayne released her fifth album, Satisfied, in February 2008—her first recording studio album in nearly a decade. In 2008, Dayne performed at the Paralympic Games in Beijing, China.

In the early 2010s, American stand-up comedian Tig Notaro began referring to Dayne in her routine, telling stories of having frequent encounters with her. This was ultimately brought to the attention of Ira Glass, who enlisted Notaro to tell the story as part of a live event for This American Life. Dayne herself appeared at the end of the monologue during the event, singing "I'll Always Love You". In May 2010, Dayne lobbied congressional leaders on Capitol Hill on behalf of the National Association of Music Merchants (NAMM) and VH1's Save The Music Foundation to reduce cuts in music education in America's schools. In July 2010, Dayne released "Facing a Miracle", the official theme song to the 2010 Gay Games. She performed the song to an audience of 50,000 on July 31, 2010, in Cologne, Germany. It ended the year at No. 9 on Perfect Beat's Top Worldwide Singles of 2010. Five years before, however, she had said: "In the eyes of the Kabbalah, [gays] can't be 'married.' That requires actual male and female energy and DNA. In the bigger picture, I think that 'marriage' is about a certain circuitry. I'm as married to my business manager as I would be any husband."

Dayne remastered her Greatest Hits album and released a new single, "Floor on Fire", on June 22, 2011, which broke the Billboard Dance/Club Charts Top 10. In September 2014, Dayne released a new single, "Dreaming". In late 2020, Dayne competed on season 4 of The Masked Singer as "Popcorn". She made it to the semi-finals of the competition before being unmasked in a triple elimination alongside Chloe Kim as "Jellyfish" and Tori Kelly as "Seahorse". In August 2022, Dayne competed on season 2 of RuPaul's Secret Celebrity Drag Race under the drag name Electra Owl.

== Personal life ==
Dayne has never married. She has two children who were born via a surrogate in 2002. Dayne is a supporter of same-sex marriage, and stated in 2014 that she considers the LGBT community to be her most loyal fanbase. Dayne is Jewish. She grew up in Baldwin and Freeport, New York on Long Island.

=== Health ===
In 2022, Dayne was diagnosed with colon cancer. She subsequently underwent surgery to remove 10 inches of her colon and was declared cancer-free. She has since become an advocate for early detection.

== Discography ==
Studio albums

- Tell It to My Heart (1988)
- Can't Fight Fate (1989)
- Soul Dancing (1993)
- Naked Without You (1998)
- Satisfied (2008)

== Filmography ==
=== Film ===
Year	Title	Role	Notes
1994	Love Affair	Marissa	
1997	Stag	Serena	
1997	Fool's Paradise	Samantha	
1999	Jackie's Back	Herself	
2002	Joshua Tree	Catherine Cooley	
2004	Jesus the Driver	Con Woman #1	
2008	Beautiful Loser	Sharon Dolan	
2012	I Am Bad	Beth	
2014	Telling of the Shoes	Brook	

=== Television ===
Year	Title	Role	Notes
1997	Night Man	Carla Day	Episode: "Pilot: Part 1 & 2"
1999	Martial Law	Elena Finn	Episode: "Thieves Among Thieves"
2000	Where Are They Now?	Herself	Episode: "The 80s II"
2000	Rude Awakening	Maureen	Recurring cast: Seasons 2–3
2006	Celebrity Duets	Herself	Episode: "1.4 & 1.5"
2006	Rescue Me	Shirley	Episode: "Zombies"
2008	I Love the New Millennium	Herself	Episode: "2000–2001 & 2007–2008"
2008	Down & Dirty	Herself	Episode: "Taylor Dayne"
2009	Gone Country	Herself	Contestant: Season 3
2010	RuPaul's Drag U	Herself/Faculty	Episode: "Dateless Divas"
2012	Rachael vs. Guy: Celebrity Cook-Off	Herself	Contestant: Season 1
2013	Cupcake Wars	Herself/Judge	Episode: "Taylor Dayne's 80s Party"
2013	Click on This	Herself	Episode: "Tommy Davidson's 50th Birthday Bash"
2019	Celebrity Sweat	Herself	Episode: "Getting Fit and Staying Healthy with Top Musicians"
2019	80's in the Sand	Herself	Episode: "1.4"
2020	On Stage	Herself	Episode: "On Stage At Home Part 2"
2020	The Masked Singer	Popcorn	Contestant: Season 4
2022	Million Dollar Listing Los Angeles	Herself	Episode: "On the Waterfront"
2022	People Puzzler	Herself	Episode: "Now Ya Tell Me"
2022	RuPaul's Secret Celebrity Drag Race	Electra Owl	Contestant: Season 2
2024	The Real Housewives of Beverly Hills	Herself	Episode: "Bitter Pill to Swallow"
2025	Pawn Stars	Herself	Episode: "Pawn It to My Heart"

== See also ==
- List of number-one hits (United States)
- List of artists who reached number one in the United States
- List of number-one dance hits (United States)
- List of artists who reached number one on the U.S. Dance chart
