= Ric Wake =

American record producer

Ric Wake is an English-American record producer. He has worked with Greek composer Yanni to help produce Yanni Voices.
