= Shine (Kids in the Kitchen album) =

Studio album by Kids in the Kitchen
- Released: 20 May 1985
- Recorded: 1983–1985
- Studio: Festival, Sydney; AAV, Melbourne; Platinum, Melbourne; 301, Sydney
- Genre: Electronic; synth-pop; new wave; pop
- Length: 40:23
- Label: Mushroom/White
- Producer: Ricky Fataar; Tim Kramer; David Kershenbaum; Kids in the Kitchen; Thom Panunzio; Mark S. Berry

Kids in the Kitchen chronology
Shine (1985)	Terrain (1987)

Singles from Shine
- 1. "Change in Mood" Released: October 1983; 2. "Bitter Desire" Released: April 1984; 3. "Something That You Said" Released: April 1985; 4. "Shine" Released: June 1985; 5. "Current Stand" Released: August 1985; 6. "My Life" Released: November 1985

International release
- Kids in the Kitchen

Shine is the debut studio album by Australian new wave, pop group Kids in the Kitchen. It was released on 20 May 1985 via Mushroom Records. It peaked at No. 9 in Australia and was certified platinum for shipment of 70,000 copies. The line-up for most of its tracks was Scott Carne on lead vocals, Bruce Curnow on drums, Craig Harnath on bass guitar, Claude Carranza on lead guitar and Alistair Coia on keyboards, with the producer Mark S. Berry working on seven of its ten tracks. It provided six singles, "Change in Mood" (1983), "Bitter Desire" (1984), "Something That You Said", "Shine", "Current Stand", and "My Life" (all 1985). The album was re-released internationally in 1986 as Kids in the Kitchen by Sire Records for the European and American markets.

== Background ==
Shine was released by Australian pop, new wave group Kids in the Kitchen on 20 May 1985 via Mushroom Records imprint White Records on both LP and music cassette (MC). The group had formed in Melbourne in 1983 with the original line-up of Scott Carne on lead vocals, Bruce Curnow on drums, Greg Dorman on lead guitar, Craig Harnath on bass guitar and Greg Woodhead on keyboards. The album's lead single "Change in Mood" was released in October and was produced by Ricky Fataar and Tim Kramer at Festival Studios, Sydney. The track is co-written by Carne, Curnow, Dorman, Harnath and Woodhead.

During 1983 they toured nationally, initially as a support to Models, then as head-liners. Kids in the Kitchen appeared regularly on Australian Broadcasting Corporation TV's youth-orientated pop music show, Countdown, with Carne guesting as co-host; he was also a "popular cover boy" for the related Countdown magazine. Carne later reflected on his first appearance, performing "Change in Mood", on the show "pretty nervous" and "excited" but "always determined".

Their second single "Bitter Desire" appeared in April 1984. It was produced by David Kershenbaum. After its appearance Dorman and Woodhead quit and were replaced by Claude Carranza on guitar and Alistair Coia on keyboards, respectively. That line-up issued the album's third single "Something That You Said" in April 1985, which was co-produced by the group with Thom Panunzio at Studios 301, Sydney and Platinum Studios, Melbourne. The main producer for the rest of the album was Mark S. Berry at Platinum Studios; they recorded with him for "about four months".

The title track was released as the fourth single in June 1985. Its fifth single, "Current Stand" followed in August; while the sixth and final single, "My Life" appeared in November. Both of the latter two singles had been written by Carne, Carranza, Coia, Curnow and Harnath. Carne believed their performance of "Current Stand" on Countdown was "really good", he explained they were "getting into our attack on America kind of period".

A CD version of the album, pressed in Japan, was also issued in November 1985, which had three additional tracks: expanded and/or remixed versions of "Bitter Desire", "Something That You Said" and "Shine" (as "Shine Shock"). In the following year a ten-track international edition was released as Kids in the Kitchen for the American and European markets with the same tracks as the Australasian version of Shine but in a different order and with different cover art.

== Reception ==
=== Critical reception ===
The Canberra Times' Rachael Warren felt Shine gave people "a variety of sound", with tracks "influenced by US West-coast sound", although it "may sound thin in some circles". Cash Box' writer said "A slick and modern outfit from Australia, [the band] deliver a brisk and captivating debut with a nod in a Simple Minds direction. Standout tracks include 'Current Stand', 'My Life' and 'Cynical'." Brendan Swift of AllMusic described the group, which "exemplified the '80s sound: well-packaged funk and dance-pop characterized by synth sounds and smooth production."

=== Commercial reception ===
"Change in Mood" peaked at No. ten on the Australian Kent Music Report singles chart. At the 1983 Countdown Music Awards, held in April 1984, it was nominated for Best Debut Single. The group performed "Bitter Desire" at the ceremony and were also nominated for Most Promising New Talent. The group's second single "Bitter Desire" and third single "Something That You Said" both reached the top 20.

Shine peaked at No. 9 on the related Kent Music Report albums chart, it remained in the top 100 for 43 weeks and was accredited with a platinum record for shipment of 70000 copies. The single "Shine" reached the top 40, "Current Stand" peaked at No. 12, and "My Life" made the top 100. They performed "Current Stand" at the 1985 Countdown Music Awards held in April 1986; where Shine was nominated for Best Debut Album and they were nominated for Most Popular Australian Group.

== Track listing ==
=== Vinyl/cassette tape version (May 1985) ===
All tracks are written by Scott James Carne, Bruce Andrew Curnow, Gregory Stewart Dorman, Craig Norman Harnath, Gregory William Woodhead, unless otherwise noted.

Side A
No.	Title	Length
1.	"Shine"	5:24
2.	"Current Stand" (Carne, Claude Achille Carranza, Alistair Lee Coia, Curnow, Harnath)	4:01
3.	"Change in Mood"	3:44
4.	"Place to Go"	3:55
5.	"Cynical"	4:02

Side B
No.	Title	Length
1.	"Something That You Said"	3:44
2.	"Bitter Desire"	3:47
3.	"My Life" (Carne, Carranza, Coia, Curnow, Harnath)	4:46
4.	"Not the Way" (Carne, Carranza, Coia, Curnow, Harnath)	2:32
5.	"How Come?" (Carne, Carranza, Coia, Curnow, Harnath)	4:32
Total length:		40:23

=== Compact disc version (November 1985) ===
All tracks are written by Carne, Curnow, Dorman, Harnath, Woodhead, unless otherwise noted.

CD Version
No.	Title	Length
1.	"Shine"	5:24
2.	"Current Stand" (Carne, Carranza, Coia, Curnow, Harnath)	4:01
3.	"Change in Mood"	3:44
4.	"Place to Go"	3:55
5.	"Cynical"	4:02
6.	"Something That You Said"	3:44
7.	"Bitter Desire"	3:47
8.	"My Life" (Carne, Carranza, Coia, Curnow, Harnath)	4:46
9.	"Not the Way" (Carne, Carranza, Coia, Curnow, Harnath)	2:32
10.	"How Come?" (Carne, Carranza, Coia, Curnow, Harnath)	4:32
11.	"Bitter Desire (12" version)"	5:49
12.	"Something That You Said (club mix)"	5:36
13.	"Shine Shock (12" version)"	7;41
Total length:		59:29

== Personnel ==
Credits adapted from Shine CD version (November 1985):

Kids in the Kitchen

- Scott Carne – lead vocals
- Bruce Curnow – drums, drum programming
- Greg Dorman – lead guitar ("Change in Mood", "Bitter Desire")
- Craig Harnath – bass guitar
- Greg Woodhead – keyboards ("Change in Mood", "Bitter Desire")
- Claude Carranza – lead guitar
- Alistair Coia – keyboards, Fairlight programming

Additional musicians

- Sherine Abeyratne – backing vocals (tracks 5, 6, 12)
- Zan Abeyratne – backing vocals (5, 6, 12)
- Marilyn Gentle – backing vocals (4, 9)
- Louis Jardin – percussion
- Peninsula Church of England School Boys Choir – choir
- Andy Richards – additional keyboards (4, 9)
- the Soul Lips – brass (2)
- Peter Sullivan – string arrangements
- Sharon Young – backing vocals (4, 9)
- David Williamson – brass (2)

Artisans

- Jim Barton – engineer (7, 11)
- John Bell – mixing engineer (1, 2, 4, 5, 8–10, 13)
- Mark S. Berry – producer (1, 2, 4, 5, 8–10, 13), additional production/mixer (6, 12)
- John Curnow – photography, band shots
- Ricky Fataar – producer (3)
- Sebastian Gollings – photography, front and back cover concept, band shots
- David Kershenbaum – producer (7, 11)
- Kids in the Kitchen – producer (6, 12)
- Tim Kramer – producer (3)
- Ian McKenzi – engineer (1, 2, 4, 5, 8–10, 13), mixing engineer (6, 12)
- Thom Panunzio – producer (6, 12)

== Charts ==
=== Weekly charts ===
Chart peak position for 1985
Chart (1985)	Peak position
Australia (Kent Music Report)	9

=== Year-end charts ===
Chart peak position for year-end 1985
Chart (1985)	Peak position
Australia (Kent Music Report)	16

== Certifications ==
Certifications and sales for Shine
Region	Certification	Certified units/sales
Australia (ARIA)	Platinum	70,000^{^}
^{^} Shipments figures based on certification alone.

== Release history ==
Release dates and formats for Shine
Region	Date	Format	Label	Catalogue No.
AUS	20 May 1985	LP, MC	Mushroom Records/White Records	RML-53168, RMC-53168
AUS	November 1985	CD	Mushroom Records/White Records	CD53168
GER	1986	LP, MC	Sire Records	925377-1, 925377-4
USA	1986	LP	Sire Records	1-25377
