= Current Stand =

Single by Kids in the Kitchen

from the album Shine
- Released: August 1985
- Studio: Platinum Studios, Melbourne
- Genre: New wave, electronic
- Length: 3:58
- Label: Mushroom Records
- Songwriter(s): Bruce Curnow, Craig Harnath, Claude Carranza, Scott Carne
- Producer(s): Mark S. Berry

Kids in the Kitchen singles chronology
"Shine" (1985)	"Current Stand" (1985)	"My Life" (1985)

"Current Stand" is a song by Australian pop/new wave group Kids in the Kitchen. The song was released in August 1985 as the fifth single from their debut album, Shine (1985). The song peaked at number 12 on the Australian Kent Music Report.

== Track listing ==
7" (K9804)

- Side A "Current Stand" - 3:58
- Side B "Current Stand" (Instrumental) - 3:58

== Charts ==
=== Weekly charts ===
Chart (1985)	Peak position
Australia (Kent Music Report)	12

=== Year-end charts ===
Chart (1985)	Peak position
Australia (Kent Music Report)	98
