= Bounce Back =

Bounce Back may refer to:

- "Bounce Back" (Fire on Blonde song), 1987
- Bounce Back (album), a 1990 album by Alisha
- "Bounce Back" (Stacie Orrico song), 2002
- "Bounce Back" (Juvenile song), 2003
- "Bounce Back" (Big Sean song), 2016
- "Bounce Back" (Little Mix song), 2019
- "Bounce Back", a song by Charice from Infinity
- "Bounce Back", a song by Stray Kids from Hop
- "Bounce Back", a song by Vaneese Thomas from Shining Time Station
- Bounce Back, in Bounce (video game series)
- The Bounce Back, a 2016 film
- Bounce Back Loan Scheme, for UK companies during 2020 covid epidemic
