= Revolution Love =

Single by Kids in the Kitchen

from the album Terrain
- Released: November 1987
- Studio: AAV Studios, Melbourne
- Genre: Electronic, funk, soul, pop rock
- Label: Mushroom Records
- Songwriter(s): Alistair Coia, Scott Carne, E. Moule
- Producer(s): Mark S. Berry

Kids in the Kitchen singles chronology
"Say It" (1987)	"Revolution Love" (1987)	"Change in Mood (remix)" (2009)

"Revolution Love" is a song by Australian pop/new wave group Kids in the Kitchen. The song was released in November 1987 as the third and final single from their second studio album, Terrain (1987). The song peaked at number 44 on the Australian Kent Music Report. It was the band's final release before they disbanded.

== Track listing ==
7" (K-459)

- Side A "Revolution Love"
- Side B "Cry"

12" (X13300)

- Side A "Revolution Love" (The Wall Street Crash Mix) - 6:37
- Side B1 "Revolution Love" (Slash & Textured Dub Mix)
- Side B2 "Revolution Love" (Percussive Edits)

== Charts ==
Chart (1987)	Peak position
Australian Kent Music Report	44
