= Shine (Kids in the Kitchen song) =

Single by Kids in the Kitchen

from the album Shine
- Released: June 1985
- Studio: Platinum Studios, Melbourne
- Genre: Pop
- Label: Mushroom Records
- Songwriters: Bruce Curnow, Craig Harnath, Greg Dorman, Greg Woodhead, Scott Carne
- Producer: Mark S. Berry

Kids in the Kitchen singles chronology
"Something That You Said" (1985)	"Shine" (1985)	"Current Stand" (1985)

"Shine" is a song by Australian pop/new wave group Kids in the Kitchen. The song was released in June 1985 as the fourth single from their debut album, Shine (1985). The song peaked at number 40 on the Australian Kent Music Report.

Chris Löfvén directed the video clip, which he calls as "a nightmare assignment". In a 2013 interview he said, "It was an extravaganza that was meant to look like the Russian Revolution, a mini-feature produced on a three-night shoot. It had fireworks and explosions and things being shot from helicopters". Lofven said he "probably spent the $25,000 budget on the first night of shooting."

== Track listing ==
7" (K9694)

- Side A "Shine"
- Side B "Hard"

12"' (X14190)

- Side A1 "Shine" (12" Version)
- Side A2 "Shine 2" (New 7" Version)
- Side B1 "Shine" (Sullivan's String Mix)
- Side B2 "Shine" (DJ's Bonus Beat Instrumental)

== Charts ==
Chart (1985)	Peak position
Australian Kent Music Report	40
