= Terrain (Kids in the Kitchen album) =

Studio album by Kids in the Kitchen
- Released: August 1987
- Recorded: 1986–1987
- Genre: Electronic; synth-pop; new wave; pop
- Label: Mushroom
- Producer: David Kershenbaum; Richard Gottehrer; Craig Harnath; Andy Wallace; Kids in the Kitchen

Kids in the Kitchen chronology
Shine (1985)	Terrain (1987)	The Kids All Mixed Up (2006)

Singles from Terrain
- 1. "Out of Control" Released: June 1986; 2. "Say It" Released: August 1987; 3. "Revolution Love" Released: November 1987

Terrain is the second and final studio album by Australian new wave and pop group Kids in the Kitchen released in August 1987. The album cover shows the band slimmed down to a trio of singer Scott Carne, bassist Craig Harnath and guitarist Claude Carranza. Drummer Bruce Curnow who had departed the band in 1986 and keyboardist Alistair Coia are both featured on the album as co-writers and musicians. The band co-wrote all songs on the album.

== Reception ==
Stuart Coupe from The Canberra Times said the album was "about as scintillating as counting your toes for 40 minutes".

== Notes ==
Following changes in the band's line up, Jason Stonehouse replaced Curnow as drummer and Simon Kershaw replace Coia on keyboards.

== Track listing ==
Side A
No.	Title	Writer(s)	Length
1.	"Say It"	Carne, Coia, Cole	4:06
2.	"Rescue Me"	Carranza, Craig Harnath	4:10
3.	"Only Heaven Knows"	Carne, Carranza, Coia, Curnow, Harnath	4:16
4.	"Don't Turn Away"	Carne, Carranza, Coia, Harnath	4:00
5.	"Stopping at Nothing"	Carne, Carranza, Coia, Curnow, Harnath	3:48

Side B
No.	Title	Writer(s)	Length
1.	"Revolution Love"	Carne, Coia, Moule	4:15
2.	"Out of Control"	Carne, Carranza, Coia, Curnow, Harnath	3:36
3.	"Cry"	Carranza, Harnath	3:17
4.	"All So Young"	Carne, Carranza, Coia, Curnow, Harnath	3:27
5.	"Surviving Years"	Carne, Carranza, Coia, Curnow, Harnath	3:05

== Charts ==
Chart (1987)	Peak position
Australian Kent Music Report Albums Chart	39
