= Nightwalkin' =

Studio album by Alisha
- Released: July 11, 1987
- Recorded: 1986–1987
- Label: RCA
- Producer: Mark Berry

Alisha chronology
| Alisha (1985) | Nightwalkin' (1987) | Bounce Back (1990) |

Nightwalkin' is the second studio album by American singer Alisha. It was released in the US on July 11, 1987 by RCA Records.

== Background ==
Pre-production for Nightwalkin' began in early 1986 after Alisha's initial success on the club charts. With the help of Mark S. Berry, she was able gain attention from major labels and signed with RCA Records for release of her second album. It was released in 1987 and, like her first album, was produced solely by Berry. It featured a more percussion-driven, synth-pop sound rather than the freestyle, electronic club sound on her debut. The album was intended to help Alisha crossover into a more mainstream artist.

== Singles and chart performance ==
"Into My Secret" was released as the lead single, peaking at No. 9 on the Hot Dance US charts, and No. 97 on the Billboard Hot 100 in August 1987. The song "Do You Dream About Me", written by songwriter Diane Warren was featured as the b-side to "Into My Secret" and in the 1987 20th Century Fox film Mannequin. "I Don't Know What Comes Over Me" was released in Europe in late 1987 while the second US single was "Let Your Heart Make Up Your Mind". It failed to crack the Hot 100, but did manage to peak at No. 23 on the Hot Dance US charts in February 1988.

Nightwalkin' failed to chart on the Billboard Top 200 and no further singles or albums were released through RCA.

In 2016, Welsh singer-songwriter Bright Light Bright Light recorded a cover of "Do You Dream About Me" for his Cinematography EP.

== Track listing ==
Produced, arranged, and recorded by Mark S. Berry for MSB Records, Ltd.

| No. | Title | Writer(s) | Length |
|---|---|---|---|
| 1. | "Into My Secret" | Mike Leeson; Peter Vale | 4:32 |
| 2. | "Love You Up" | Pam Reswick; Steve Werfel; Allan Rich | 3:11 |
| 3. | "Girls Don't Lie" | Paul Chitten; Michael Des Barres | 4:31 |
| 4. | "Play With Boys" | Billy Livsey; Graham Fellows | 3:45 |
| 5. | "Let Your Heart Make Up Your Mind" | Alexandra Forbes; Eric Beall | 4:08 |
| 6. | "Nightwalkin'" | Bob Christianson; Peppy Castro | 4:15 |
| 7. | "I Don't Know What Comes Over Me" | Leeson; Vale | 3:51 |
| 8. | "Do You Dream About Me" | Diane Warren | 3:36 |
| 9. | "Save A Little Love" | Andrew Goldmark; Bruce Roberts | 4:15 |
| 10. | "Into The Night" | Tony Green; Cindy Valentine | 3:58 |
| Total length: | | | 40:02 |
