= Teddy Castellucci =

- Born: Theodore Ross Castellucci; 1965 (age 60–61); U.S.
- Occupations: Composer
- Years active: 1990–2011

Theodore Ross Castellucci (born 1965) is an American retired film score composer. A graduate of Lindenhurst Senior High School on Long Island, New York in 1983, Castellucci has won five BMI Film Music Awards. He is mostly known for working in comedy projects, and for being the recurring composer in films starring Adam Sandler, before being replaced by Rupert Gregson-Williams. Castellucci appeared on screen as a band member (the guitarist) in The Wedding Singer and his name was used for minor characters in both The Wedding Singer and Big Daddy.

In 1990, he performed guitar on American singer Alisha's album Bounce Back.

== Filmography ==
Year	Title	Director	Notes
1998	The Wedding Singer	Frank Coraci	
1999	Big Daddy	Dennis Dugan	
1999	Deuce Bigalow: Male Gigolo	Mike Mitchell	
2000	Little Nicky	Steven Brill	
2000	How to Marry a Billionaire: A Christmas Tale	Rod Daniel	Television film
2001	The Animal	Luke Greenfield	
2001	Good Advice	Steve Rash	
2002	Mr. Deeds	Steven Brill	
2002	Repli-Kate	Frank Longo	
2002	Home Alone 4	Rod Daniel	Television film
2002	Eight Crazy Nights	Seth Kearsley	Composed with Ray Ellis; Marc Ellis
2003	Anger Management	Peter Segal	
2003	My Boss's Daughter	David Zucker	
2003	Date or Disaster	Richard Elfman	Short film
2004	50 First Dates	Peter Segal	
2004	White Chicks	Keenen Ivory Wayans	
2005	The Longest Yard	Peter Segal	
2005	Rebound	Steve Carr	
2006	Just My Luck	Donald Petrie	
2006	Little Man	Keenen Ivory Wayans	
2006	My Super Ex-Girlfriend	Ivan Reitman	
2007	Wild Hogs	Walt Becker	
2007	Are We Done Yet?	Steve Carr	
2008	The Longshots	Fred Durst	
2008	American Violet	Tim Disney	
2009	Baby on Board	Brian Herzlinger	
2009	The Answer Man	John Hindman	
2010	Lottery Ticket	Erik White	
2011	Southbound	Tim Disney	Short film
