= The Wedding Singer =

1998 American film by Frank Coraci

- Theatrical release poster
- Directed by: Frank Coraci
- Written by: Tim Herlihy
- Produced by: Robert Simonds; Jack Giarraputo
- Starring: Adam Sandler; Drew Barrymore; Christine Taylor
- Cinematography: Tim Suhrstedt
- Edited by: Tom Lewis
- Music by: Teddy Castellucci
- Production companies: Brillstein-Grey Entertainment; Robert Simonds Productions
- Distributed by: New Line Cinema
- Release date: February 13, 1998
- Running time: 96 minutes
- Country: United States
- Language: English
- Budget: $18 million
- Box office: $123.3 million

The Wedding Singer is a 1998 American romantic comedy film directed by Frank Coraci, written by Tim Herlihy, and produced by Robert Simonds and Jack Giarraputo. The film stars Adam Sandler, Drew Barrymore, and Christine Taylor, and tells the story of a wedding singer in 1985 who falls in love with a waitress. The film was released on February 13, 1998 by New Line Cinema. Produced on a budget of $18 million, it grossed $123 million worldwide and received generally positive reviews from critics. It is often ranked as one of Sandler's best comedies.

The film was later adapted into a stage musical of the same name, debuting on Broadway in April 2006 and closing on New Year's Eve of that same year. Jon Lovitz would reprise his role as Jimmie Moore in the episode of the same name of The Goldbergs, set during the events of The Wedding Singer, with Sandler, Barrymore and Billy Idol appearing through the use of archival footage. The film marks the first collaboration between Sandler and Barrymore, and is followed by 50 First Dates and Blended (the latter also directed by Coraci).

== Plot ==
In 1985, Robbie Hart works as a wedding singer in Ridgefield, New Jersey, and is preparing to marry his fiancée, Linda. At the reception hall where he performs, he befriends Julia Sullivan, a new waitress. Robbie agrees to sing at Julia's wedding, though her fiancé, businessman and bond investor Glenn Gulia, has not yet set a date.

On Robbie's wedding day, his older sister Kate tells him, just before the ceremony, that Linda has decided not to marry him. The abandonment humiliates Robbie and leaves him emotionally devastated. Linda later explains that she was attracted to his earlier ambition of becoming a rock star, and she does not want to be married to a wedding singer.

Robbie becomes severely depressed, worrying those around him. His best friend Sammy persuades him to return to work, but Robbie performs poorly and alienates wedding guests. He decides to stop taking wedding bookings and withdraws his promise to sing for Julia after Glenn finally chooses a wedding date.

Julia asks Robbie to help with wedding planning anyway, and their friendship deepens. Julia's cousin Holly develops an interest in Robbie and asks Julia for permission to date him. During a double date with Julia and Glenn, Robbie learns that Glenn cheats repeatedly and intends to continue doing so after marriage.

As Robbie and Julia grow closer, they become conflicted about their feelings. After Holly suggests that Julia is choosing Glenn for financial security, Robbie tries to improve his prospects by seeking a bank job, but he fails to secure one. Julia is disappointed by Robbie's sudden focus on money, and they argue after he accuses her of being motivated by the same concerns. Discouraged, Robbie attempts to adopt Sammy's pattern of casual relationships, but Sammy admits he is unhappy and urges Robbie to be honest with Julia.

Meanwhile, Julia confides in her mother that she no longer loves Glenn and has developed feelings for Robbie. Robbie arrives intending to declare his feelings and sees Julia through her bedroom window wearing her wedding dress. Not knowing that Julia is privately imagining a marriage to Robbie, he assumes she is thinking about Glenn and leaves.

Robbie drinks heavily and encounters Glenn at his bachelor party, where Glenn is openly involved with another woman. The two argue, Glenn punches Robbie, and he mocks him. Robbie returns home and finds Linda waiting to reconcile, but he passes out.

The next morning, Linda answers Robbie's door and introduces herself as his fiancée to a shocked Julia. Julia runs to Glenn and insists they marry immediately; Glenn proposes eloping to Las Vegas. Robbie wakes, rejects Linda’s attempt to return, and forces her to leave, finally recognizing how superficial their relationship has been.

At the 50th wedding anniversary party of Robbie's neighbor Rosie, whom he has been giving singing lessons, Robbie realizes he wants a long-term life with Julia. Rosie encourages him to act, and Holly soon reports that Julia plans to elope with Glenn. Robbie rushes to the airport and boards a flight to Las Vegas.

On the plane, Robbie tells his story to sympathetic passengers, including Billy Idol, and learns that Julia and Glenn are on the same flight. With help from the crew and Idol, Robbie sings a song he wrote, "Grow Old with You", over the intercom for Julia. Glenn tries to attack Robbie, but other passengers, including Idol, restrain and confine him in an airplane lavatory. Robbie and Julia confess their love and kiss. Idol offers to recommend Robbie to record executives, and Robbie and Julia are later married, with a band led by Robbie’s friend David performing at their wedding.

== Cast ==
- Adam Sandler as Robbie Hart, a wedding singer
- Drew Barrymore as Julia Sullivan, a waitress and later Robbie's love interest
- Christine Taylor as Holly Sullivan, Julia's cousin
- Allen Covert as Sammy, Robbie's best friend
- Angela Featherstone as Linda, Robbie's former fiancée
- Matthew Glave as Glenn Gulia, a businessman and bond investor who was Julia's fiancé
- Alexis Arquette as George Stitzer, keyboardist and singer in Robbie's band
- Jodi Thelen as Kate Hart, Robbie's older sister
- Frank Sivero as Andy, Kate's husband
- Christina Pickles as Angie Sullivan, Julia's mother
- Ellen Albertini Dow as Rosie
- Teddy Castellucci, Randy Razz, and John Vana as the remaining members of Robbie's band
- Billy Idol as himself
- Kevin Nealon as Mr. Simms
- Carmen Filpi as Old Man in Bar
- Robert Smigel as Andre
- Peter Dante as David's friend
- Jimmy Karz as Julia's dance partner at the Bar Mitzvah

Other notable appearances in the film include future Queens of the Stone Age musician Michael Shuman as the Bar Mitzvah boy, screenwriter Steven Brill as Glenn's buddy, the film's writer Timothy P. Herlihy as Rudy, a bartender, and model Shanna Moakler as a flight attendant. Also appearing uncredited were Steve Buscemi as David Veltri, Jon Lovitz as Jimmie Moore, and Brian Posehn as Man at Dining Table #9, and Chauntal Lewis as Stuck-Up Girl at Bar Mitzvah.

== Production ==
The Wedding Singer is a 1980s nostalgia film. Adam Sandler had an idea for a comedy about a wedding singer who gets left at the altar, and suggested it to Tim Herlihy. Inspired by the radio show "Lost in the '80s" Herlihy decided to set the film in that decade. Herlihy had not set out to do anything different and thought the script was similar to his previous collaborations with Sandler. The changes came naturally, and he attributed the differences to his recently having gotten married, as well as the chemistry between Sandler and Barrymore. Herlihy was aware that Sandler's previous films had lacked a female perspective, and emphasized the importance of Barrymore. He explained that she was so great in her scenes that test audiences did not complain about Sandler not being in every scene as they had done for his previous films, and as a result, more of her scenes survived and were included in the final film. Carrie Fisher, a frequent script doctor, was brought on to make the female part more balanced. Judd Apatow and Sandler also performed uncredited rewrites of the script.

Director Frank Coraci was friends with Sandler since they went to college at NYU and could hardly believe that he and his friends had the opportunity to make films together. Coraci had also gotten over his own experiences of romantic heartbreak a few years earlier and was able to look back on it differently and instead allow it to be funny. Coraci was a fan of director John Hughes and mentioned his films as an important influence.

Barrymore approached Sandler about working together on a film, saying they were "cinematic soulmates" before they had even worked together. Barrymore had a great relationship with Coraci, and praised him for balancing the broad comedy with the important moments of emotion and intimacy. Sandler would often make Barrymore laugh out of context, so that even after a long day, her laughs on camera would be real. In addition, she would not read or hear the songs until the first shoot so that her reactions would be more spontaneous.

Principal photography took place in California from February 3 to March 25, 1997.

== Reception ==
=== Box office ===
The film had a budget of $18 million and made $123.3 million worldwide in ticket sales. It opened in second in the US with $18.8 million, behind holdover Titanic.

=== Critical response ===
On Rotten Tomatoes, the film holds an approval rating of 72% based on 69 reviews, with an average rating of 6.3/10. The website's critics consensus reads, "It's decidedly uneven -- and surprisingly sappy for an early Adam Sandler comedy -- but The Wedding Singer is also sweet, funny, and beguiling." On Metacritic, it has a weighted average score of 60 out of 100 based on 21 critics, indicating "mixed or average reviews". Audiences surveyed by CinemaScore gave the film an average grade of "A−" on an A+ to F scale.

Reviews of the film frequently described it as a conventional romantic comedy whose appeal lay more in execution and tone than in narrative novelty. Rita Kempley wrote in The Washington Post that the story is predictable but still broadly enjoyable, emphasizing its modest, good-natured entertainment value. Stephanie Zacharek similarly argued in Salon.com that the film's charm is easy to feel even when its pacing and joke-writing falter, characterizing it as likable despite its structural weaknesses.

Commentary often treated the film as a recalibration of Adam Sandler's screen persona, with critics evaluating how convincingly he shifted from abrasive comedy to romantic lead. Ruthe Stein, writing in the San Francisco Chronicle, highlighted a comparatively sweet-natured performance that softened Sandler's established image, even as she noted the film's reliance on formula. David Denby, in New York, framed the same tension as central to the viewing experience, describing the film as pleasant and emphasizing how its gentler romantic premise reshapes the kind of comedy the star delivers.

Drew Barrymore's performance and the film's central chemistry were repeatedly cited as key assets, including by reviewers who were otherwise lukewarm about the material. Zacharek pointed to Barrymore’s screen presence as a principal reason the film stays engaging, suggesting that her warmth helps carry scenes that might otherwise feel thin. Kempley likewise singled out Barrymore as a major highlight within the film's pleasures. By contrast, Roger Ebert argued on Chicago Sun-Times that Barrymore's romantic-comedy gifts were placed in a story he regarded as overly mechanical, making her effectiveness stand out against what he saw as weaker storytelling.

The film's 1980s setting and pop-cultural references were another prominent focus, with reviewers divided on whether the nostalgia enriched or substituted for stronger plotting. Zacharek described the soundtrack and period texture as a major component of the film's momentum, while also suggesting that the film can feel loosely assembled. Stein acknowledged the abundance of era-specific jokes and details but suggested the reference-heavy approach could become forced. Marc Savlov, writing for The Austin Chronicle, was more skeptical about the deployment of period touches, portraying the nostalgia as heavily applied even while allowing for the film’s light, audience-friendly pleasures. Ebert also treated the era-specific material as part of a broader complaint about lazy construction. Reviews by Janet Maslin of The New York Times, Kevin Thomas of Los Angeles Times, and Leonard Klady of Variety, as excerpted by Metacritic, likewise foregrounded the film's romance and accessible comedy, indicating that the period framing was part of its mainstream appeal.

Supporting performances and individual comic set pieces were commonly referenced as strengths, sometimes serving as points of agreement across otherwise mixed reviews. Kempley pointed to the film's comic energy beyond the lead pairing, noting the contribution of supporting players to its overall entertainment value. Zacharek also treated side bits and cameo-style humor as part of the film’s durability, even when she criticized its unevenness. Ebert, despite his negative appraisal, still highlighted Steve Buscemi's wedding toast sequence as a standout, using it to contrast isolated effectiveness with his broader dissatisfaction.

Criticism clustered around formula, pacing, and tonal consistency rather than around the basic premise or the lead chemistry. Ebert argued that the film alternates between sweetness and cruelty in a way that undermines its romantic intentions, and he criticized what he viewed as an unearned sincerity built on familiar plot moves. Zacharek, while more positive overall, similarly identified lapses into easy or mean-spirited jokes and described the structure as slack at points. Savlov's characterization of the film as lightweight and potentially cloying further reflected the view that its pleasantness could tip into excess.

=== Other responses ===
Boy George responded to the film, saying that when he saw Alexis Arquette doing an impersonation of him and singing "Do You Really Want to Hurt Me", he thought it was hilarious.

The film has frequently been ranked as one of Adam Sandler's best comedies.

== Soundtrack ==
Two soundtrack albums for the film, called The Wedding Singer and The Wedding Singer Volume 2, were released in 1998, and contained mostly new wave songs. While the film had the actors performing many of the songs, the soundtrack albums, for the most part, contained original versions of them instead, as well as the songs that were in the background during the film and original songs and dialogue from it. Only for "Rapper's Delight" was its rendition by Ellen Dow used, in combination with the original recording.

The track listing of the first album is:

1. "Video Killed the Radio Star" (originally performed by the Buggles), performed by the Presidents of the United States of America
2. "Do You Really Want to Hurt Me", performed by Culture Club
3. "Every Little Thing She Does Is Magic", performed by the Police
4. "How Soon Is Now?", performed by the Smiths
5. "Love My Way", performed by the Psychedelic Furs
6. "Hold Me Now", performed by Thompson Twins
7. "Everyday I Write the Book", performed by Elvis Costello
8. "White Wedding", performed by Billy Idol
9. "China Girl" (originally performed by Iggy Pop), performed by David Bowie
10. "Blue Monday", performed by New Order
11. "Pass the Dutchie", performed by Musical Youth
12. "Have You Written Anything Lately?"
13. "Somebody Kill Me", written by Adam Sandler and Tim Herlihy, performed by Adam Sandler
14. "Rapper's Delight" (medley), performed by Sugarhill Gang and Ellen Dow

The track listing of the second album is:

1. "Too Shy", performed by Kajagoogoo
2. "It's All I Can Do", performed by the Cars
3. "True", performed by Spandau Ballet
4. "Space Age Love Song", performed by A Flock of Seagulls
5. "Private Idaho", performed by the B-52's
6. "Money (That's What I Want)", performed by the Flying Lizards
7. "You Spin Me Round (Like a Record)", performed by Dead or Alive
8. "Just Can't Get Enough", performed by Depeche Mode
9. "Love Stinks", performed by the J. Geils Band
10. "You Make My Dreams", performed by Hall & Oates
11. "Holiday", performed by Madonna
12. "Grow Old with You", written by Adam Sandler and Tim Herlihy, performed by Adam Sandler

The following songs and renditions appeared in the film, but were not included on the soundtrack albums:

- "Der Kommissar", performed by After the Fire
- "99 Luftballons", performed by Nena
- "Till There Was You", written by Meredith Willson, performed by Ellen Dow
- "Don't Stop Believin'" (originally performed by Journey)
- "Boys Don't Cry", performed by the Cure
- "All Night Long (All Night)", performed by Lionel Richie
- "That's All", written by Alan Brandt & Bob Haymes, performed by Adam Sandler
- "Ladies' Night" (originally performed by Kool & the Gang), performed by Jon Lovitz
- "Do You Believe in Love", performed by Huey Lewis and the News
- "Jam on It", Newcleus
- "Miami Vice Theme", performed by Jan Hammer
- "Hungry Heart", performed by Bruce Springsteen
- "The Goofball Brothers Show", written and performed by Sourcerer
- "Wake Me Up Before You Go-Go", performed by Wham!

Certifications for "The Wedding Singer" soundtracks
Region	Certification	Certified units/sales
Australia (ARIA)	2× Platinum	140,000^{^}
Canada (Music Canada)	Platinum	100,000^{^}
United Kingdom (BPI)	Gold	100,000^{*}
United States (RIAA)	2× Platinum	2,000,000^{^}
Volume 2
Canada (Music Canada)	Platinum	100,000^{^}
United States (RIAA)	Gold	500,000^{^}
^{*} Sales figures based on certification alone.^{^} Shipments figures based on certification alone.

== Musical adaptation ==
In 2006, a musical adaptation of the same name was released on Broadway starring Stephen Lynch as Robbie and Laura Benanti as Julia. The show has had two national tours in 2007-2008 and 2009-2010 respectively. It was nominated for five Tony Awards and eight Drama Desk Awards and received generally positive reviews. In the show, the airplane scene with Billy Idol was replaced with a scene in Las Vegas where Robbie meets a Billy Idol impersonator, and they and a group of other impersonators including Ronald Reagan, Cyndi Lauper and Imelda Marcos come to convince Julia to give up Glenn. In addition, Robbie's neighbor Rosie is changed to be his grandma with whom he lives and who asks him to write a song out of a poem she wrote for the 50th anniversary party. Also Robbie's friend, Sammy, was changed from being a limousine driver to being a part of Robbie's band. The show only ran on Broadway for 284 performances, but it has become a popular show among community theaters and high schools.
