= All Night Passion =

Single by Alisha

from the album Alisha
- Released: February 1984
- Length: 6.48 (Original Version); 7.05 (Extended Dance Mix)
- Label: Vanguard Records
- Songwriter: Rick Tarbox
- Producer: Mark S. Berry

Alisha singles chronology
"All Night Passion" (1984)	"Too Turned On" (1985)

"All Night Passion" is the debut single by American singer Alisha. It was released from the self-titled album "Alisha" in the United States in 1984.

== Song background ==
When Alisha was 14, she joined a local rock/dance group The Babysitters. Her parents arranged for her to record a demo tape with them, and her family sent the tape to several record companies. It eventually made its way to producer Mark S. Berry through Vanguard Records. Berry had been looking for a singer with a great voice to record "All Night Passion". The song was recorded in the summer of 1983, but didn't start getting airplay until February 1984. The song became very successful in the clubs, eventually leading Alisha to sign with Vanguard Records in 1984 for a full-length album, which Berry went on to produce.

== Cover ==
In 1986, a cover version by Venezuelan singer Azabache (Gladys Chirinos) sang "A Bailar".

== Chart performance ==
Chart (1984)	Peak position
U.S. Billboard Hot Dance Club Songs	4
U.S. Billboard Hot 100	103
