= Too Turned On =

Single by Alisha

from the album Alisha
- Released: 1985
- Genre: Freestyle; electronic
- Length: 6.17 (Original Version); 3.40 (Radio Version)
- Label: Vanguard
- Songwriter(s): Alexandra Forbes
- Producer(s): Mark S. Berry

Alisha singles chronology
"All Night Passion" (1984)	"Too Turned On" (1985)	"Baby Talk" (1985)

"Too Turned On" is a single by American freestyle and dance-pop singer Alisha. It was released as the second single from her debut studio album Alisha and became another club hit for her in 1985.

== Chart performance ==
"Too Turned On" peaked at No. 6 on the Billboard Dance Club Songs chart, staying on the chart for 11 weeks.

Chart (1985)	Peak position
U.S. Billboard Hot Dance Club Songs	6
