= Baby Talk (Alisha song) =

Single by Alisha

from the album Alisha
- B-side: "One Little Lie"
- Released: September 27, 1985
- Recorded: 1985
- Genre: Dance-pop; synth-pop; freestyle; R&B; funk
- Length: 5:35 (Album Version); 6:45 (Extended Dance Mix); 4:04 (Radio Edit)
- Label: Vanguard
- Songwriter(s): Greg Brown; Logankoya
- Producer(s): Mark S. Berry

Alisha singles chronology
"Too Turned On" (1985)	"'Baby Talk'" (1985)	"Stargazing" (1985)

"Baby Talk" is a 1985 single by American freestyle and dance-pop singer Alisha. Originally recorded and released by Gregg Brown in 1984, Alisha's version was popular in the dance clubs and reached No. 1 on the Billboard Hot Dance Club Songs chart in December 1985.

== Background and chart performance ==
"Baby Talk" was written by singer-songwriter Gregg Brown and Logankoya. It was originally a single performed by Brown, released in the UK in 1984 on Beau-Jolly Records. Alisha's version was produced by Mark S. Berry and released on September 27, 1985 as the third single from her debut studio album Alisha by Vanguard Records. "Baby Talk" became Alisha's most successful single to date, reaching No. 1 on the Billboard Hot Dance charts in the final week of December 1985. The single crossed over to the Hot 100 charts reaching No. 68 in February 1986, and on the Hot Black Singles chart, peaking at No. 75. It was also released in the UK on Total Control Records, and reached No. 67 on the UK Singles Chart.

== Music video ==
The music video features Alisha entering a nightclub with one of the band members asking if the guy Alisha invited will show up to see her perform that night. Eventually, the guy does show to see Alisha perform the song and after she finished performing he surprises her and asks her if they want to go somewhere to talk.

== Track listing and formats ==
7" Single

1. "Baby Talk" 4:04
2. "One Little Lie" 4:24

US 12-inch vinyl single

1. "Baby Talk (Special Remix)" – 6:45
2. "Baby Talk (Instrumental Dub)" – 5:36
3. "Baby Talk (Vocal Dub)" – 4:32

== Charts ==
=== Weekly charts ===
Chart (1985–1986)	Peak position
Belgium (Ultratop 50 Flanders)	2
France (SNEP)	19
Netherlands (Dutch Top 40)	7
Netherlands (Single Top 100)	9
UK Singles (OCC)	67
US Billboard Hot 100	68
US Dance Club Songs (Billboard)	1
US Hot R&B/Hip-Hop Songs (Billboard)	75
West Germany (GfK)	19

=== Year-end charts ===
Chart (1986)	Position
Belgium (Ultratop Flanders)	61
Netherlands (Dutch Top 40)	71
Netherlands (Single Top 100)	91
