= Kids in the Kitchen =

Australian band

- Origin: Melbourne, Victoria, Australia
- Genres: Pop; funk; new wave
- Years active: 1983–1988, 2016–present
- Labels: White; Mushroom; Festival
- Members: Scott Carne; Bruce Curnow; Craig Harnath; Claude Carranza
- Past members: Greg Dorman; Greg Woodhead; Alistair Coia; Jason Stonehouse; Simon Kershaw; Sterling Campbell

Kids in the Kitchen are an Australian pop and new wave band which formed in 1983. They enjoyed chart success with four top-20 hits on the Australian Kent Music Report Singles Chart, "Change in Mood" (1983), "Bitter Desire" (1984), "Something That You Said" and "Current Stand" (both 1985). The related album, Shine (20 May 1985), reached No. 9 on the Kent Music Report Albums Chart and was the 16th-biggest-selling album of 1985 in Australia. A second album, Terrain, followed in August 1987 peaking at #39, in October of that year. The group disbanded in 1988. Kids in the Kitchen supported the Australian leg of Culture Club's 2016 world tour.

== History ==
Kids in the Kitchen formed early in 1983 in Melbourne with the line-up of Scott Carne on lead vocals, Bruce Curnow on drums, Greg Dorman on lead guitar, Craig Harnath on bass guitar, and Greg Woodhead on keyboards. The group played live for eight months before signing with Mushroom Records' White label. Australian musicologist, Ian McFarlane, described how they had "attracted a great deal of attention. [They] had the right sound (contemporary synth pop with a dash of funk inspired by the likes of Duran Duran, Spandau Ballet and Chic), the right looks and plenty of youthful appeal to make a grab for the charts".

The band's debut single, "Change in Mood" (produced by Ricky Fataar and Tim Kramer), reached No. 10 on the Australian Kent Music Report Singles Chart in December 1983. It was co-written by Dorman, Carne, Harnath, Curnow and Woodhead. The group toured nationally, initially as a support to Models, then as headliners. Kids in the Kitchen appeared regularly on Australian Broadcasting Corporation TV's pop music series, Countdown, with Carne often guesting as co-host; he was also a "popular cover boy" for the related Countdown magazine.

Their second single, "Bitter Desire", hit No. 17 in April 1984. It was produced by David Kershenbaum. After its appearance Dorman and Woodhead quit the band and were replaced by Claude Carranza and Alistair Coia, respectively. On 15 April that year they performed "Bitter Desire" at the annual Countdown Music and Video Awards, where they were nominated for 'Most Promising New Talent' and 'Best Debut Single' for "Change in Mood". The first single released under the new line up, "Something That You Said", was another Top-20 hit in April 1985. It was co-produced by the band with Thom Panunzio and Ian "Molly" Meldrum at 301 Studios, Sydney.

On 20 May 1985 the band issued its debut album, Shine, which reached No. 9 on the Kent Music Report Albums Chart. The Canberra Times' Rachael Warren noted that due to main producer Mark Berry it was "influenced by US West-coast sound" and "may sound thin in some circles" but it gave "people a variety of what the band is really like". The album was certified platinum for shipment of 70,000 copies. They promoted its release by further national tours. Although the title track only reached No. 40 as a single, the next, "Current Stand", became the band's signature song and was a hit overseas as well as peaking at No. 12 in Australia. Chris Löfvén directed the music video for "Shine", which he later described as being "a nightmare assignment" with "fireworks and explosions and things being shot from helicopters".

In September 1985, The Canberra Times' Paul Gardiner, Rolling Stone's Jane Gardiner and Toby Creswell predicted in "The Next Big Thing" that Kids in the Kitchen would be more prominent in the next five years. They were described as one of the "bands which attract support as either middling bands on the way up or potential big bands". Carne joined as guest vocalist with The Incredible Penguins late in 1985, for a cover of "Happy Xmas (War Is Over)", a charity project for research on fairy penguins, which peaked at No. 10 in December.

During 1986, Shine was re-issued as Kids in the Kitchen by Sire Records for the European and United States markets. Late that year Curnow was fired from the band; he was temporarily replaced by Sterling Campbell on drums (who left to join Cyndi Lauper Band) and more permanently by Jason Stonehouse. Curnow later told Matt Dowling of ABC Shepparton radio station that it "was a tour to promote the album Shine over in America... and when I got there they said 'well thanks for your services they are no longer required' ... as brutal as that... I spent six months getting over it".

A new single, "Out of Control", was released in June 1986. The Canberra Times' Lisa Wallace described it as "brash, harsh and too, too heavy; overkill, senseless" and disputed promotional accolades from their record company, writing "I beg to differ ... Somewhere down there lurks a melody line and some lyrics, but I'm not too sure how many people will be willing to cut through the crap to find it". The single stalled at a disappointing No. 33 on the Australian chart.

Kids in the Kitchen's second LP, Terrain, was released in August 1987 but only peaked at number 39 on the Australian album charts. It was co-produced by Richard Gottehrer, Harnath, Kids in the Kitchen, Andy Wallace and Kershenbaum. Ian McFarlane felt it was "patchy, but it displayed a more mature dance approach". Music journalist Stuart Coupe described it as "less heartfelt, more synthetic" and it was "about as scintillating as counting your toes for 40 minutes; Oh well, everything can't be great – we've got to have some yard stick for measuring the good Australian albums!" Late that year Simon Kershaw (ex-Go 101) joined on keyboards. The album provided more singles, but the group could not match the chart success of their earlier material.

In November 1987, Carne told Karen Middleton of The Canberra Times of his disappointment in their record company's choice of producers for Terrain and their previous management: "[w]e could've basically produced the album ourselves and probably done an equally [good] or better job, but unfortunately record companies want names of producers on the album ... [a]nd the guys we're dealing with on our level ... are just really average and you end up doing the job anyway".

Despite Carne indicating that the group was due to work on a third album in the new year, Kids in the Kitchen broke up in 1988. In 1988, Australian promoter Paul Dainty defended his approach of working with popular acts, John Farnham and Glenn Shorrock, at the expense of lesser known artists, "[y]ou just don't hear enough about new bands like Kids in the Kitchen whereas someone like [Farnham] or [Shorrock] ... The critics always say, 'Give new music and young groups a go' ... but, the point is, the people who are paying the money want established acts".

== Afterwards ==
Following the split of Kids in the Kitchen, Carne joined a rockabilly band, Priscilla's Nightmare, which released a self-titled album, then embarked on a solo career. Carne's solo single, "All I Wanna Do", was a minor hit in 1990. Curnow opened a Billy Hyde music store in Shepparton in 2002. Harnath was a producer, including working for Chocolate Starfish. He also worked on soundtracks for Australian Broadcasting Corporation TV shows, Frontline (1994–1997) and Funky Squad (1995). He later owned Hothouse Studios in St Kilda. As of 2018, Scott Carne still tours Australia as a solo act singing the songs of Kids in the Kitchen. The 2014 "Absolutely 80s" tour saw Carne team up with Brian Mannix of Uncanny X-Men, Paul Gray (Wa Wa Nee), David Sterry (Real Life), Tim Rosewarne (Big Pig) and others. A compilation CD "Absolutely 80s – Then & Now" was also released to coincide with the event.

In June 2016, Kids in the Kitchen consisting of Scott Carne, Claude Carranza, Bruce Curnow and Craig Harnath were one of the support acts for Culture Club's 2016 Australian tour. They were also booked to play the Hunter Valley, supporting Culture Club's Encore Tour in December 2016. Scott Carne also announced that the band recently released a remastered edition of Shine on CD.

In late 2019, the group announced that they would appear at the Spiegeltent and The Palms at Crown Casino in early 2020, with their original line-up, appearing for the first time together since 1984.

== Members ==
=== Current members ===
- Scott Carne – vocals, acoustic guitar (1983–1988, 2016–present)
- Bruce Curnow – drums (1983–1986, 2016–present)
- Craig Harnath – bass (1983–1988, 2016–present)
- Claude Carranza – guitars (1984–1988, 2016–present)

=== Former members ===
- Greg Dorman – guitars (1983–1984, 2019, 2020)
- Greg Woodhead – keyboards (1983–1984; died 2020)
- Alistair Coia – keyboards (1984–1986)
- Jason Stonehouse – drums (1986–1988)
- Simon Kershaw – keyboards (1987–1988)
- Sterling Campbell – drums (1986)

== Discography ==
=== Studio albums ===
Title	Details	Chart peak position	Certifications
Title	Details	AUS	Certifications
Shine	Released: 20 May 1985; Label: White Label/Mushroom (L-19248); Formats: Vinyl Record, Cassette, CD	9	AUS: Platinum
Terrain	Released: August 1987; Label: White Label/Mushroom (L-38775); Formats: Vinyl Record, Cassette, Compact Disc	39	

=== Remix albums ===
Title	Details
The Kids All Mixed Up	Released: 2006; Remix album; Label: PopShop; Formats: digital download
Dance Mixes 84-87	Released: 18 June 2021; Remix album; Label: Co-Star Music; Formats: digital download, streaming

=== Singles ===
Year	Title	Peak chart positions	Album
Year	Title	AUS	Album
1983	"Change in Mood"	10	Shine
1984	"Bitter Desire"	17	Shine
1985	"Something That You Said"	19	Shine
1985	"Shine"	40	Shine
1985	"Current Stand"	12	Shine
1985	"My Life"	74	Shine
1986	"Out of Control"	33	Terrain
1987	"Say It"	31	Terrain
1987	"Revolution Love"	44	Terrain

== Awards and nominations ==
=== Countdown Australian Music Awards ===
Countdown was an Australian pop music TV series on national broadcaster ABC-TV from 1974 to 1987, it presented music awards from 1979 to 1987, initially in conjunction with magazine TV Week. The TV Week / Countdown Awards were a combination of popular-voted and peer-voted awards.

Year	Nominee / work	Award	Result
1983	"Change in Mood"	Best Debut Single	Nominated
1983	themselves	Most Promising New Talent	Nominated
