= Jam Productions =

Jam Productions may refer to:

- JAM Creative Productions, an American commercial music production
- JAM Productions (software), an American computer game development company

== See also ==
- The Jam (production team), an American producing and recording duo
- Jam-On Productions, a musical group that formed the basis of Newcleus
