= Mountain (Chocolate Starfish song) =

1994 single by Chocolate Starfish

Single by Chocolate Starfish

from the album Chocolate Starfish
- Released: 14 February 1994
- Length: 4:57
- Label: EMI
- Songwriter: Chocolate Starfish
- Producer: Brian Canham

Chocolate Starfish singles chronology
"All Over Me" (1993)	"Mountain" (1994)	"Four Letter Word" (1994)

"Mountain" is a song by Australian rock group Chocolate Starfish. The song was released in February 1994 as the third single from their debut studio album, Chocolate Starfish (1994).

== Background ==
In a 2012 interview, band member Adam Thompson said: "I remember when we actually wrote 'Mountain', we'd recorded 'You're So Vain' and we'd written a whole bunch of other songs and we were looking for another single. Zoran (Romich) had come up with a couple of chords and I was playing this game where I was running back from the gym, trying not to step on the cracks in the pavement... and suddenly the rhythm that I was running or jogging sort of fitted, and I had that chord going on in the background and I thought 'Gee, that’s a good melody.' And when I got back, virtually within a night, we'd written 'Mountain' and we knew straight away that it was going to be a hit single. We just knew."

Thompson added; "And as for the lyric, I was over in L.A. with the band and left my girlfriend at home and she said 'I don't want you to tour anymore. When you come home, I want you to stay with me and get a normal job and to be a responsible boyfriend.' And this was obviously my dream for eight or nine years to be in a band and the passion that I was trying to find and when I was writing the song, the metaphor of the mountain and the river just came to me. She wanted me to stay still, like a mountain, an immovable force and I felt like a river that was just meandering and finding its destiny. The guys and I just looked at it and said 'Yep, that's gonna work.' and, of course, it did."

== Track listing ==
CD single

1. "Mountain"
2. "Mountain" (acoustic)

== Charts ==
=== Weekly charts ===
Chart (1994)	Peak position
Australia (ARIA)	12

=== Year-end charts ===
Chart (1994)	Position
Australia (ARIA)	56
