= All Over Me =

All Over Me may refer to:

- All Over Me (film), a 1997 drama
- "All Over Me" (Josh Turner song), 2010
- "All Over Me" (Blake Shelton song), 2001
- "All Over Me" (Charlie Rich song), 1975
- "All Over Me" (Chocolate Starfish song), 1993
- "All Over Me", a 2002 song by Aphrodite
- "All Over Me", a song by David Byrne from Look into the Eyeball
- "Freakin' Out" / "All Over Me", a song by Graham Coxon
- "All Over Me", a song by Lisa Stansfield from The Complete Collection
- "All Over Me", a song by Drowning Pool from Sinner
- "All Over Me", a song by The Benjamin Gate
