= My Life (Kids in the Kitchen song) =

Single by Kids in the Kitchen

from the album Shine
- Released: November 1985
- Studio: Platinum Studios, Melbourne
- Genre: New wave, Poprock
- Label: Mushroom Records
- Songwriter(s): Bruce Curnow, Craig Harnath, Greg Dorman, Greg Woodhead, Scott Carne
- Producer(s): Mark S. Berry

Kids in the Kitchen singles chronology
"Current Stand" (1985)	"My Life" (1985)	"Out of Control" (1986)

"My Life" is a song by Australian pop/new wave group Kids in the Kitchen. The song was released in November 1985 as the sixth and final single from their debut album, Shine (1985). The song peaked at number 74 on the Australian Kent Music Report.

The group performed the song live on Countdown.

== Track listing ==
7" (K9885)

- Side A "My Life" (single edit)
- Side B1 "Fun - Take One"
- Side B2 "Frog"

== Charts ==
=== Weekly charts ===
Chart (1985)	Peak position
Australian Kent Music Report	74
