= Alisha (Alisha Ann Itkin album) =

Studio album by Alisha
- Released: 1985 12" vinyl 1986 CD
- Recorded: 1983–1985
- Genre: Dance-pop; club; freestyle
- Label: Vanguard
- Producer: Mark Berry

Alisha chronology
Alisha (1985)	Nightwalkin' (1987)

Alisha is the debut studio album by American freestyle and dance-pop artist Alisha. It was released in the US in 1985 by Vanguard Records.

== Background ==
At age 14, Alisha got the attention of producer Mark S. Berry when a demo tape of hers got to him through Vanguard Records. Berry was looking for a vocalist for the track "All Night Passion" and after its success, he went on to produce her debut album.

The album was released on 12" vinyl in 1985. The original vinyl release contains the album versions of "Stargazing" and "Baby Talk". The album was released on CD in 1986, and the original mixes of "Stargazing" and "Baby Talk" were replaced by their extended dance mixes.

"Baby Talk" was originally recorded by Gregg Brown and released in the UK in 1984, and "One Little Lie", written by singer-songwriter Kirsty MacColl, was recorded by Anni-Frid Lyngstad of ABBA, and released on her 1984 album Shine.

== Singles and chart performance ==
The album spawned many club hits, "All Night Passion" was released in 1984 and reached No. 4 on the Hot Dance Club charts, staying there for 2 weeks. "Too Turned On" was released as a follow-up single and peaked at No. 6 on the Hot Dance Club charts in July 1985. Alisha's biggest single to date "Baby Talk" followed, peaking at No. 1 on the Hot Dance Club chart in December 1985 for one week. It was also her first appearance on the Billboard Hot 100, peaking at No. 68 in February 1986. "Stargazing" was released as the final single in the US, reaching No. 16 on the Hot Dance Club charts in July 1986, and "Boys Will Be Boys" was released as a single in Germany. The album did not chart on the Billboard Top 200.

== Track listing ==
1985 vinyl edition
No.	Title	Writer(s)	Length
1.	"All Night Passion" (Original Version)	Rick Tarbox	6:51
2.	"Stargazing"	Jimmy Halperin	5:23
3.	"Baby Talk"	Greg Brown; Logankoya	5:37
4.	"Too Turned On"	Alexandra Forbes	6:17
5.	"Boys Will Be Boys"	Peggy Stanziale; Andrea La Russo	3:30
6.	"One Little Lie"	Kirsty MacColl; Simon Climie	4:32
7.	"All Night Passion" (Special Album Remix)	Tarbox	7:00
Total length:			39:34

1986 CD edition
No.	Title	Length
1.	"All Night Passion" (Original Version)	6:48
2.	"Stargazing" (Extended Dance Mix)	5:48
3.	"Baby Talk" (Extended Dance Mix)	6:45
4.	"Too Turned On"	6:17
5.	"Boys Will Be Boys"	3:33
6.	"One Little Lie"	4:32
7.	"All Night Passion" (Extended Dance Mix)	7:05
Total length:		40:49

== Personnel ==
Album credits adapted from the liner notes of Alisha.

- Alisha - vocals
- Mark Berry - producer, musician
- The Brass Bed Factory - photography prop
- Joel Broddsky - photography
- Greg Brown - composer
- Simon Climie - composer
- Bev Collins - background vocals
- Carol Collins - background vocals
- Alexandra Forbes - composer
- Greco & Emmi, Inc. - album design
- Jimmy Halperin - composer, musician
- Chuck Hammer - musician
- Chris Hills - musician
- Tay Hoyle - engineer
- Robbie Kilgore - musician
- Andrea La Russo - composer
- Nikki Lauren - background vocals
- Logankoya - composer
- Kirsty MacColl - composer
- Penny Mealing - background vocals
- Richard Musk - musician
- Shep Pettibone - mixer, additional producer, musician
- Mark Richardson - musician
- Beth Rudetsky - background vocals
- Michael Rudetsky - arranger
- Steve Schwartz - musician
- Peggy Stanziale - composer
- Rick Tarbox - composer
- Jimi Tunnell - musician, background vocals
- Andy Wallace - musician, remix engineer
- Jeff Zaraya - executive producer
- Paul Zinman - musician, engineer
