= Jeff Franzel =

American songwriter and musician

Jeffrey B. Franzel is an American, New York-based songwriter and musician. His songs have been featured on albums in several countries. He also performs in a Jazz Quartet in his hometown, New York City.

== Background ==
He began his career as a jazz pianist and toured with many groups, including big band legend Les Brown. During that time he accompanied such artists as Frank Sinatra, Sammy Davis Jr., and Mel Tormé. After advice he received from Les Brown, he focused his energy on composing. Since then Franzel has also continued his career as a performing musician.

== Songwriting career ==
=== Pop hits ===
Franzel's song "Don't Rush Me was recorded in 1989 by Taylor Dayne and eventually peaked at No. 2 on the Billboard Hot 100. In 1990, he co-wrote the album track "I Need Forever" along with Jim Klein for American singer Alisha, included on the album Bounce Back. He also wrote "Never Saw Blue Like That" — sung by Shawn Colvin, in the Julia Roberts film, Runaway Bride. Jeff cowrote “When you know” featured in the movie Serendipity. He currently works on songs for the pop, country, and Christian contemporary markets.
