= All Over Me (Chocolate Starfish song) =

1993 single by Chocolate Starfish

Single by Chocolate Starfish

from the album Chocolate Starfish
- B-side: "On This Day"; "You're So Vain"
- Released: 1 November 1993
- Length: 4:17
- Label: EMI Australia
- Songwriter(s): Chocolate Starfish
- Producer(s): Brian Canham

Chocolate Starfish singles chronology
"You're So Vain" (1993)	"All Over Me" (1993)	"Mountain" (1994)

"All Over Me" is a song by Australian rock band Chocolate Starfish. The song was released in November 1993 as the second single from their debut studio album, Chocolate Starfish (1994).

== Track listing ==
CD single

1. "All Over Me" – 4:17
2. "On This Day" – 3:51
3. "You're So Vain" – 4:11

== Charts ==
Chart (1993)	Peak position
Australia (ARIA)	33
