= Accidentally Cool =

1995 single by Chocolate Starfish

"Mountain"

Single by Chocolate Starfish

from the album Box
- B-side: "Rollercoaster"
- Released: 17 July 1995
- Length: 3:56
- Label: Virgin
- Songwriters: Adam Thompson, Zoran Romich
- Producer: Brian Canham

Chocolate Starfish singles chronology
"Sign of Victory" (1994)	"Mountain" (1995)	"April the Fool" (1995)

"Accidentally Cool" is a song by Australian rock group Chocolate Starfish, co-written by members Adam Thompson and Zoran Romich. It was released in July 1995 as the lead single from their second studio album, Box (October 1995), and peaked at No. 39 on the Australian ARIA Singles Chart in August.

== Track listing ==
CD single

1. "Accidentally Cool" – 3:56
2. "Rollercoaster" – 3:47

== Charts ==
Chart (1995)	Peak position
Australia (ARIA)	39
