= Bitter Desire =

Single by Kids in the Kitchen

from the album Shine
- Released: 2 April 1984
- Recorded: 1984
- Studio: AAV, Melbourne
- Genre: Electronic, new wave
- Length: 3:45
- Label: Mushroom Records
- Songwriter(s): Bruce Curnow, Craig Harnath, Greg Dorman, Greg Woodhead, Scott Carne
- Producer(s): David Kershenbaum

Kids in the Kitchen singles chronology
"Change in Mood" (1983)	"Bitter Desire" (1984)	"Something That You Said" (1985)

"Bitter Desire" is a song by Australian pop/new wave group Kids in the Kitchen. The song was released in April 1984 as the second single from their debut studio album Shine (1985). The song peaked at number 17 on the Australian Kent Music Report.

On 15 April 1984, the group performed "Bitter Desire" at the annual Countdown Music and Video Awards, where they were nominated for 'Most Promising New Talent' and 'Best Debut Single' for "Change in Mood".

== Line-up changes ==
By the time of the single's release and despite appearing in the videoclip for it, lead guitarist Greg Dorman and keyboardist Greg Woodhead had departed the line-up to be replaced by Claude Carranza and Alistair Coia, respectively.

== Reception ==
Countdown Magazine said at the time of release, "if "Change in Mood" had been merely promising, "Bitter Desire" should seal [their] fate. That record is simply the best Australian single so far this year, and displays a depth of inspiration beyond any mere beginner's luck."

== Track listing ==
7" (K9353)

- Side A "Bitter Desire" - 3:45
- Side B "Hunting and Haunting" - 3:42

12"' (X13147)

- Side A1 "Bitter Desire" (Kitchen Mix) - 5:48
- Side B1 "Bitter Desire" (instrumental) - 3:45
- Side B2 "Hunting and Haunting" (instrumental) - 3:42

== Charts ==
=== Weekly charts ===
Chart (1984)	Peak position
Australia (Kent Music Report)	17

=== Year-end charts ===
Chart (1984)	Peak position
Australia (Kent Music Report)	87
