= Don't Rush Me =

1988 single by Taylor Dayne

- US single cover

Single by Taylor Dayne

from the album Tell It to My Heart
- B-side: "In the Darkness"
- Released: October 24, 1988
- Genre: Synth-rock; R&B
- Length: 3:47
- Label: Arista
- Songwriters: Alexandra Forbes; Jeff Franzel
- Producer: Ric Wake

Taylor Dayne singles chronology
"I'll Always Love You" (1988)	"Don't Rush Me" (1988)	"With Every Beat of My Heart" (1989)

Music video
- "Don't Rush Me" on YouTube

"Don't Rush Me" is a song performed by American singer Taylor Dayne, released as the fourth single from her debut studio album Tell It to My Heart (1988). It was written by Alexandra Forbes and Jeff Franzel, with production provided by Ric Wake. It was first released in early September 1988 in the United Kingdom before being officially released on October 24, 1988, to the United States via Arista Records to contemporary hit radio. The cover art of the single was later used on the 1988 US reissue of Tell It to My Heart. The song lyrically has a message regarding abstinence.

"Don't Rush Me" gave Dayne her then-highest-charting single in the United States, hitting number two on the US Billboard Hot 100; internationally however the track under-performed, only hitting the top forty in Germany.

== Critical reception ==
Cash Box gave the single a positive review writing, "Taylor displays her usual beefy vocal blast that seems to elevate the most standard of material. This song is a hair above that, and should fly on CHR." Gavin Report also gave the track a favorable review saying, "'Don't Rush Me,' though thoroughly danceable is neither aggresssive nor sluggish. It's a pop bullseye that is immediately likeable." Pan-European magazine Music & Media commented favorably writing, "Formula disco with bite. Dayne has a striking voice and plenty of enthusiasm."

== Chart performance ==
"Don't Rush Me" peaked at number two on the US Billboard Hot 100 on January 21, 1989, being blocked from the top spot by Phil Collins's "Two Hearts". At the time, it was Dayne's highest-charting single on the Billboard Hot 100. It spent 20 weeks in total on the chart and was also a success on component charts, hitting number three on the Adult Contemporary chart and number six on the Dance Club Songs chart. On Cashbox however, the track topped the chart for a single week on January 28, 1989.

== Music video ==
The accompanying music video for "Don't Rush Me" was originally directed by Alek Keshishian in Los Angeles. It featured a performance by Dayne and "a series of vignettes involving a "real sexy guy" in various states of undress." For unknown reasons however, the music video was re-shot and Keshishian was replaced by David Hogan for directing and filmed in New York City instead of Los Angeles. The revised clip is a performance video shot at the Capitol Theatre. It made its debut to VH-1 on December 10, 1988. It was released the following week to MTV and Night Tracks. On December 24, 1988, the video was also released to BET.

== Track listings and formats ==
US 7-inch single

1. "Don't Rush Me" – 3:47
2. "In the Darkness" – 3:16

US 12-inch single

1. "Don't Rush Me" (Extended Version) – 7:15
2. "Don't Rush Me" (Bonus Beats) – 3:35
3. "Don't Rush Me" (Single Version) – 3:47
4. "Don't Rush Me" (Dub Version) – 6:07

French 12-inch single

1. "Don't Rush Me" (Continental Clubhouse Mix) – 8:40
2. "Don't Rush Me" (Continental Dubhouse Mix) – 5:36
3. "Don't Rush Me" (Rushapella) – 3:35

German CD single

1. "Don't Rush Me" (Extended Version) – 7:15
2. "Don't Rush Me" (Dub Version) – 5:41
3. "Don't Rush Me" (Single Version) – 3:47
4. "In the Darkness" – 3:16

== Charts ==
=== Weekly charts ===
Weekly chart performance for "Don't Rush Me"
Chart (1988–1989)	Peak position
Australia (ARIA)	73
Canada Top Singles (RPM)	4
Europe (Eurochart Hot 100)	88
New Zealand (Recorded Music NZ)	50
UK Singles (Official Charts)	76
US Billboard Hot 100	2
US Adult Contemporary (Billboard)	3
US Dance Club Songs (Billboard)	6
US Dance Singles Sales (Billboard)	20
US Hot Crossover 30 (Billboard)	5
US Top 100 Pop Singles (Cashbox)	1
US Adult Contemporary (Gavin Report)	7
US Top 40 (Gavin Report)	2
US Adult Contemporary (Radio & Records)	3
US Contemporary Hit Radio (Radio & Records)	2
West Germany (GfK)	33

=== Year-end charts ===
1989 year-end chart performance for "Don't Rush Me"
Chart (1989)	Position
Canada Top Singles (RPM)	63
US Billboard Hot 100	38
US Adult Contemporary (Billboard)	36
US Adult Contemporary (Gavin Report)	59
US Top 40 (Gavin Report)	62
US Adult Contemporary (Radio & Records)	49
US Contemporary Hit Radio (Radio & Records)	45
