= Change in Mood =

Single by Kids in the Kitchen

from the album Shine
- Released: 3 October 1983
- Recorded: 1983
- Studio: Festival Studios, Sydney
- Genre: Electronic, synth-pop
- Length: 3:44
- Label: Mushroom Records
- Songwriter(s): Bruce Curnow, Craig Harnath, Greg Dorman, Greg Woodhead, Scott Carne
- Producer(s): Ricky Fataar, Tim Kramer

Kids in the Kitchen singles chronology
"Change in Mood" (1983)	"Bitter Desire" (1984)

"Change in Mood" is the debut single from Australian pop/new wave group Kids in the Kitchen. The song was released in October 1983 as the lead single from their debut studio album, Shine (1985). The song peaked at number 10 on the Australian Kent Music Report.

At the 1983 Countdown Music Awards, the song was nominated for Best Debut Single.

== Track listing ==
7" (K9220)

- Side A "Change in Mood" - 3:44
- Side B "Far from Where"

== Charts ==
=== Weekly charts ===
Chart (1983–1984)	Peak position
Australia (Kent Music Report)	10

=== Year-end charts ===
Chart (1984)	Peak position
Australia (Kent Music Report)	90
