= Box (Chocolate Starfish album) =

Studio album by Chocolate Starfish
- Released: 13 October 1995
- Recorded: 1995
- Genre: Pop, rock, pop rock
- Length: 54:16
- Label: Virgin Records

Chocolate Starfish chronology
Chocolate Starfish (1994)	Box (1995)	Born Again Versions (2014)

Singles from Box
- 1. "Accidentally Cool" Released: July 1995; 2. "April the Fool" Released: October 1995; 3. "Motherless" Released: November 1995; 4. "Holy Water" Released: May 1996

Box is the second studio album by Australian rock music group Chocolate Starfish. The album was released in October 1995 and peaked at number 6 on the ARIA Charts. The album spawned four singles.

== Track listing ==
No.	Title	Writer(s)	Length
1.	"Clash"	Adam Thompson, Zoran Romic	3:59
2.	"Accidentally Cool"	Thompson, Romic	3:56
3.	"Holy Water"	Thompson, Romic	4:32
4.	"April the Fool"	Thompson, Romic	4:13
5.	"Rocking Horse"	Thompson, Romic	4:22
6.	"Another Insane"	Thompson, Romic	4:00
7.	"Chain of Pain"	Thompson, Romic	4:33
8.	"Tin Man"	Thompson, Romic	3:23
9.	"Too Hot To Rain"	Thompson, Romic	5:25
10.	"Motherless"	Thompson, Romic	4:32
11.	"Black Diamond Love"	Thompson, Romic	3:17
12.	"Automatic"	Thompson, Romic	3:19
13.	"Thunder in My Heart"	Thompson, Romic	4:45
Total length:			54:16

== Charts ==
Chart (1995)	Peak position
Australian Albums (ARIA)	6

== Release history ==
Region	Date	Format	Edition(s)	Label	Catalogue	Ref.
Australia	October 1995	CD; Cassette	Standard	Virgin Records	8146142	
