= Out of Control (Kids in the Kitchen song) =

Single by Kids in the Kitchen

from the album Terrain
- Released: June 1986
- Studio: AAV Studios, Melbourne
- Genre: New wave, rock
- Length: 3:34
- Label: Mushroom Records
- Songwriters: Bruce Curnow, Craig Harnath, Alistair Coia, Claude Carranza, Scott Carne
- Producer: David Kershenbaum

Kids in the Kitchen singles chronology
"My Life" (1985)	"Out of Control" (1986)	"Say It" (1987)

"Out of Control" is a song by Australian pop/new wave group Kids in the Kitchen. The song was released in June 1986 as the lead single from their second studio album, Terrain (1987). The song peaked at number 33 on the Australian Kent Music Report.

== Reception ==
The Canberra Times said; "Out of control indeed! It's brash, harsh and too too heavy; overkill, senseless. Promos from the record company described this as 'essential dance music in a ballad-ridden chart era' and touted their boys as being 'both now and the future... no wanna-bes in sight'... I beg to differ, they were. Somewhere down there lurks a melody line and some lyrics, but I'm not too sure how many people will be willing to cut through the crap to find it. I was very disappointed as both their previous performances and the record cover itself had me expecting more. I only hope this is a momentary aberration."

== Video ==
The clip to accompany the single was the last to feature drummer Bruce Curnow and keyboardist Alistair Coia as part of the official line-up, although both would later be credited as musicians and co-writers on Terrain.

== Track listing ==
7" (K9938)

- Side A "Out of Control" - 3:34
- Side B "Stop" - 3:00

12" (X14290)

- Side A "Out of Control" (The No Mercy Mix) - 5:00
- Side B1 "Out of Control" (No Vocals) - 3:34
- Side B2 "Stop" - 3:00

== Charts ==
Chart (1986)	Peak position
Australian Kent Music Report	33
