= Chocolate Starfish =

Australian rock band

Background information
- Origin: Melbourne, Australia
- Genres: Rock
- Years active: 1992–1998, 2010–present
- Labels: EMI; Virgin
- Members: Norman Falvo; Adam Thompson; John "Stone" Nixon; Darren Danielson
- Past members: Craig Harnath; Bruce Pawsey; Zoran Romic; Tim Rosewarne
- Website: chocolatestarfish.com.au

Chocolate Starfish is an Australian rock band formed in 1992 and disbanded in 1998. Their self-titled debut album, issued in April 1994, peaked at No. 2 on the ARIA Albums Chart. It was followed in October 1995 by their second album, Box, which reached No. 6. Their highest-charting single, "You're So Vain", is a cover version of Carly Simon's 1972 hit. It peaked at No. 11 on the ARIA Singles Chart in September 1993. They had another hit with "Mountain" in March 1994, which reached No. 12.

The group reformed in 2010 and on 31 March 2012, guitarist Zoran Romic died of non-Hodgkin lymphoma after remission from an earlier bout. Since the reformation, the group has released a further three studio albums.

The group are also known for paying homage to great and touring classic albums, including odes to Meat Loaf's Bat Out of Hell in 2017 and INXS's Kick in 2018 and a Bohemian Rhapsody tour in 2021.

== History ==
=== 1992-1998: Formation, Chocolate Starfish & Box ===
Chocolate Starfish were founded in Melbourne in early 1992 with Norman Falvo on keyboards and vocals; Craig Harnath (ex Kids In The Kitchen) on bass guitar, Bruce Pawsey on drums; Zoran Romic on guitar and vocals and Adam Thompson on vocals. The band played a limited number of shows with a comical country based theme under the name of The Hodads at the Station Hotel. Australian rock music historian, Ian McFarlane, described Thompson as an "entertaining frontman who lent the music an air of much-needed theatricality and melodrama". Other early members were guitarist Brett Kingman (also a member of Uncanny X-Men, and a member of James Reyne's band for many years), and John Justin.

In January 1993 Chocolate Starfish released their debut extended play, Seafood. By that time ex-Roxus members John "Stone" Nixon and Darren Danielson replaced Harnath on bass guitar and Pawsey on drums, respectively. In August they released their debut single—a cover version of Carly Simon's "You're So Vain"—which reached No. 11 on the ARIA Singles Chart. Their second single, "All Over Me" (October), reached the top 40; while their third single, "Mountain", peaked at No. 12 in March 1994.

Their debut album, Chocolate Starfish, was released in April 1994, and reached No. 2 on the ARIA Albums Chart. The album was certified platinum. It was produced by Pseudo Echo front man, Brian Canham, for EMI Music Australia. The album appeared in the top 40 on the ARIA End of Year Charts. McFarlane felt the album "showcased the band's confident and punchy, if overwrought, delivery". Falvo left the group at the end of 1994 and Tim Rosewarne replaced him on keyboards for the second album, Box, released in October 1995, reached No. 6. This was mixed by Thom Panunzio (U2, Soundgarden) and produced by Canham for Virgin Records. McFarlane felt it was similar to their debut album and "mixed strong vocals with grungy riffs, anthemic choruses with moody ballads, and accessible 1970s-influenced rock with tight 1990s production values". In 1997 Danielson left and the group relocated to Paris for six months; they disbanded by 1998.

=== 1997-2009: After disbandment ===
In 1997 Danielson and Canham formed a band, Brill, which released one self-titled album independently. In 1998 Romic joined Brill. When Canham re-formed Pseudo Echo in 1998, he recruited Danielson to play drums. In the following years, Romic and Danielson formed The Fur Group and Fur Records in Melbourne with successful bands such as Skybombers.

=== 2010-present: Reformation, Born Again Versions, Spider & Beautiful Addiction ===
In 2010 Chocolate Starfish reformed with a line-up of Danielson, Falvo, Nixon, Romic and Thompson. They started work on new studio material, however a planned concert tour was cancelled when Romic was diagnosed with non-Hodgkin lymphoma in March 2011. A benefit concert was held for Romic in October 2011—at which he performed with Chocolate Starfish—and on 31 March 2012 he died of the cancer.

The band continued after Romic's death and from January to March 2013 they played on the Red Hot Summer Tour alongside Jimmy Barnes, Ian Moss and Dragon. For the tour they used Tim Henwood (The Androids, The Superjesus) on guitar.

In 2014, the band recorded a wholly acoustic album of favourites called Born Again Versions (BAV) with the premise that "If a song can stand the rigours of a rework and still hold up, then hopefully it has the hallmarks of a good song".

In 2014, the band wrote a song for a TV commercial in the Northern Territory, which lead to them writing and recording an EP. In October 2014, the group released a self-produced EP titled Primitive. Drummer Daniel Danielson said "It's a little from where we left off in the '90s. I'd like to think that we still have that energy that we had back in the day." Thompson told Forte magazine, "I'm going to tell you that it's fantastic that we finally have some new material we can shop around and show people. It was a long time coming to put it together, because everybody has other things in their lives going on and Starfish isn't a full-time thing anymore. It freshens everything up and its a welcome change for us I think."

On 31 October 2014, the group performed a one-off performance of Meat Loaf's Bat Out of Hell album from start to finish.

In March 2015, the band released their first new single in almost 20 years, titled "Cinderella". All proceeds from the sale of the song were donated to the Jaime Wild Foundation in support of a young woman challenged by motor neurone disease.

On 31 December 2017, the band released their first album of new material in twenty years, titled Spider dedicated to Zoran "Spider" Romic. Romic co-wrote the album track "Heavyweight" several years ago. The album's lead single "Farmer Loretta" was released in early 2018.

In December 2020, the band released the EP Scaled Back which includes tracks from 1993 debut recorded in an intimate, jam session.

In March 2021, the band confirmed the release of the album, Beautiful Addiction set for release in May 2021. The lead single is a cover of 4 Non Blondes' "What's Up".

== Discography ==
=== Studio albums ===
Title	Album details	Peak chart positions	Certifications
Title	Album details	AUS	Certifications
Chocolate Starfish	Released: April 1994; Label: EMI (8293542); Formats: CD, cassette	2	AUS: Platinum
Box	Released: October 1995; Label: Virgin (8146142); Formats: CD, cassette	6	
Born Again Versions	Released: March 2014; Acoustic album; Label: Chocolate Starfish; Formats: CD, digital download	—	
Spider	Released: 31 December 2017; Label: Chocolate Starfish; Formats: CD, digital download, Streaming	—	
Beautiful Addiction	Released: 14 May 2021; Label: Chocolate Starfish; Formats: CD, digital download, streaming	—	
"—" denotes a recording that did not chart or was not released in that territory.

=== Live albums ===
Title	Details
Live at Red Hot Summer Tour 2018	Released: 19 March 2019; Label: Chocolate Starfish; Format: Digital download, streaming

=== Extended plays ===
List of EPs, with selected details
Title	Details	Peak chart positions
Title	Details	AUS
Seafood	Released: 18 January 1993; Label: Fable/EMI; Format: CD, cassette	114
Primitive	Released: 24 October 2014; Label: Chocolate Starfish; Format: Digital download	—
Scaled Back	Released: 1 December 2020; Label: Chocolate Starfish; Format: Digital download, Streaming	—

=== Singles ===
Year	Song	Peak chart positions		Certifications	Album
Year	Song	AUS	NZ	Certifications	Album
1993	"You're So Vain"	11	29	AUS: Gold	Chocolate Starfish
1993	"All Over Me"	33	—		Chocolate Starfish
1994	"Mountain"	12	—	AUS: Gold	Chocolate Starfish
1994	"Four Letter Word"	41	—		Chocolate Starfish
1994	"Sign of Victory"	119	—		Chocolate Starfish
1995	"Accidentally Cool"	39	—		Box
1995	"April the Fool"	45	—		Box
1995	"Motherless"	67	—		Box
1996	"Holy Water"	77	—		Box
2015	"Cinderella"	—	—		Non-album single
2018	"Farmer Loretta"	—	—		Spider
2018	"Mountain 2.0" (with Karnage n Darknis)	—	—		Non-album single
2021	"What's Up"	—	—		Beautiful Addiction
2021	"3 Words"	—	—		Beautiful Addiction
2024	"The Candyman Blues"	—	—		Non-album single
"—" denotes releases that did not chart.

== Awards and nominations ==
=== ARIA Music Awards ===
The ARIA Music Awards is an annual awards ceremony that recognises excellence, innovation and achievement across all genres of Australian music. Chocolate Starfish has been nominated three times.

Year	Nominee / work	Award	Result
1994	"You're So Vain"	Breakthrough Artist – Single	Nominated
1994	"You're So Vain"	Highest Selling Single	Nominated
1995	"Mountain"	Highest Selling Single	Nominated
