= Say It (Kids in the Kitchen song) =

Single by Kids in the Kitchen

from the album Terrain
- Released: August 1987
- Studio: AAV Studios, Melbourne
- Genre: New wave, rock
- Length: 4:05
- Label: Mushroom Records
- Songwriters: Alistair Coia, Gardner Cole, Scott Carne
- Producer: Richard Gottehrer

Kids in the Kitchen singles chronology
"Out of Control" (1986)	"Say It" (1987)	"Revolution Love" (1987)

"Say It" is a song by Australian pop/new wave group Kids in the Kitchen. The song was released in August 1987 as the second single from their second studio album, Terrain (1987). The song peaked at number 31 on the Australian Kent Music Report.

== Track listing ==
7" (K-368)

- Side A "Say It" - 4:05
- Side B "White Love" (Live at the Peking Cultural Centre) - 4:16

12" (X13294)

- Side A "Say It" (Extended Version) - 6:22
- Side B "Say It" (Swelter Bound Mix) - 6:25

== Charts ==
Chart (1987)	Peak position
Australian Kent Music Report	31
