= Chocolate Starfish (album) =

Studio album by Chocolate Starfish
- Released: 8 April 1994
- Recorded: 1993
- Studio: Metropolis Audio, Sing Sing Studios
- Genre: Pop, rock, pop rock
- Label: EMI Music Group
- Producer: Brian Canham

Chocolate Starfish chronology
| Seafood (1992) | Chocolate Starfish (1994) | Box (1995) |

Singles from Chocolate Starfish
- 1. "You're So Vain" Released: 15 August 1993; 2. "All Over Me" Released: 31 October 1993; 3. "Mountain" Released: February 1994; 4. "Four Letter Word" Released: May 1994; 5. "Sign of Victory" Released: October 1994

Chocolate Starfish is the debut studio album by Australian rock music group, Chocolate Starfish, The album was released in April 1994 and peaked at number 2 on the ARIA Charts. The album spawned five singles and was certified Platinum.

== Track listing ==
| No. | Title | Writer(s) | Length |
|---|---|---|---|
| 1. | "Four Letter Word" | Chocolate Starfish | 4:22 |
| 2. | "All Over Me" | Adam Thompson, Glen Haffenden, Zoran Romich | 4:15 |
| 3. | "Ten Feet Tall" | Chocolate Starfish | 4:15 |
| 4. | "In Me" | Chocolate Starfish | 2:56 |
| 5. | "Mountain" | Chocolate Starfish | 4:57 |
| 6. | "Big" | Chocolate Starfish | 4:46 |
| 7. | "You're So Vain" | Carly Simon | 4:09 |
| 8. | "Kiss My Fire" | Chocolate Starfish | 3:10 |
| 9. | "Sign of Victory" | Thompson, David Campbell, Romich | 4:35 |
| 10. | "Head" | Thompson, Romich | 4:05 |
| 11. | "Sway Up" | Chocolate Starfish | 3:18 |
| 12. | "Into the Fire" (includes hidden track "Sway Up (acoustic)") | Thompson, Campbell | 18:19 |

Bonus live disc
| No. | Title | Writer(s) | Length |
|---|---|---|---|
| 1. | "Ten Feet Tall" | Chocolate Starfish | 4:26 |
| 2. | "Big" | Chocolate Starfish | 4:24 |
| 3. | "Four Letter Word" | Chocolate Starfish | 4:20 |
| 4. | "God" | | 3:17 |
| 5. | "Mountain" | Chocolate Starfish | 5:59 |
| 6. | "Head" | Thompson, Romich | 6:35 |
| 7. | "All Over Me" | Thompson, Haffenden, Romich | 8:30 |

== Charts ==
=== Weekly charts ===
| Chart (1994) | Peak position |
|---|---|
| Australian Albums (ARIA) | 2 |

=== Year-end charts ===
| Chart (1994) | Rank |
|---|---|
| Australian Albums Chart | 34 |
| Australian Artist Albums Chart | 6 |

== Certifications ==
| Region | Certification | Certified units/sales |
|---|---|---|
| Australia (ARIA) | Platinum | 70,000^{^} |
^{^} Shipments figures based on certification alone.

== Release history ==
| Region | Date | Format | Edition(s) | Label | Catalogue | Ref. |
|---|---|---|---|---|---|---|
| Australia | April 1994 | CD; Cassette | Standard; Standard + Bonus live tracks | EMI Music Group | 8293542 | |
