= Something That You Said =

Single by Kids in the Kitchen

from the album Shine
- Released: April 1985
- Studio: Studios 301, Sydney & Platinum Studios, Melbourne
- Genre: Electronic, synth-pop
- Length: 3:57
- Label: Mushroom Records
- Songwriter(s): Bruce Curnow, Craig Harnath, Greg Dorman, Greg Woodhead, Scott Carne
- Producer(s): Kids in the Kitchen, Thom Panunzio, David Kershenbaum

Kids in the Kitchen singles chronology
| "Bitter Desire" (1984) | "Something That You Said" (1985) | "Shine" (1985) |

"Something That You Said" is a song by Australian pop/new wave group Kids in the Kitchen. The song was released in April 1985 as the third single from their debut studio album Shine (1985). The song peaked at number 19 on the Australian Kent Music Report.

== Track listing ==
7" (K9578)

- Side A "Something That You Said" - 3:57
- Side B "The Cruel Tune"

12"' (X14169)

- Side A1 "Something That You Said" (club mix) - 5:36
- Side A2 "Bruce's Big Bonus Beats"
- Side B1 "Something That You Said" (dub)
- Side B2 "Something That You Said" (instrumental) - 3:56

== Charts ==
| Chart (1985) | Peak position |
|---|---|
| Australian Kent Music Report | 19 |
