= Bounce Back (album) =

Studio album by Alisha
- Released: May 15, 1990
- Recorded: 1989–1990
- Genres: Freestyle, pop, synthpop, dance-pop
- Length: 40:48
- Labels: MCA Records (US); Nippon Phonogram (Japan)
- Producer: Michael Jay

Alisha chronology
| Nightwalkin' (1987) | Bounce Back (1990) |

Bounce Back is the third and final studio album from American freestyle and dance-pop singer Alisha. It was released on May 15, 1990, by MCA Records, her first album released by the label after leaving RCA Records.

== Background ==
After failing to garner mainstream success with her second album Nightwalkin', Alisha parted with RCA Records and signed a new deal with MCA Records for her third album. MCA's president at the time Al Teller had contacted producer Michael Jay to ask if he would produce Alisha's album. Jay went on to produce Bounce Back, and it was released in May 1990. The album became her only appearance on the Billboard Top 200 chart, where it peaked at No. 166 in July 1990. The album lasted on the chart for a total of four weeks.

The first single from album was the title track "Bounce Back", which was released in the US and Germany, where it found success by peaking on the Hot Dance Charts US at No. 10 in July 1990. It became her highest-charting single on the Billboard Hot 100, peaking at No. 54 the week of June 30, 1990. The follow-up single "Wrong Number" failed to chart.

The album track "Kiss Me Quick" was written by Jay, Marvin Morrow and Martika, the latter who is best known for her 1989 American number one hit "Toy Soldiers". Martika also provided backing vocals on the track, whilst she herself recorded a largely unreleased version of "Bounce Back" in 1987 and had worked with Jay on her 1988 self-titled debut album. Alisha co-wrote one track on the album - "Don't Let Our Love Go", which remains her only writing credit on any of her three albums.

Bounce Back was considered a major disappointment commercially, and Alisha was dropped by MCA shortly after. Being her only album to chart on the Billboard Top 200, Bounce Back also became her last album to date.

== Recording ==
The album was recorded and engineered at Trax Recording in Hollywood, CA, whilst it was mastered at Precision, Hollywood, CA. It was produced for Captain Hook Productions.

Tracks 1, 5, 6, 8 and 10 were mixed at Ground Control, Santa Monica, CA, tracks 2 and 3 were mixed at Cherokee, Los Angeles, CA, whilst tracks 4, 7 and 9 were mixed at Larrabee, Los Angeles, CA.

== Release ==
The album was released via MCA Records in America only on CD, cassette and vinyl,> whilst it was released on Nippon Phonogram in Japan on CD.

For the vinyl version of the album, the a-side was titled "Bounce" and the b-side "Back".

The album's artwork of a close up shot of Alisha with a pink background was similar to the artwork of the "Bounce Back" single.

== Promotion ==
For the "Bounce Back" single, a music video was created, whilst both "Wrong Number" and "You've Really Gotten to Me" had no music video.

== Track listing ==
| No. | Title | Writer(s) | Length |
|---|---|---|---|
| 1. | "Wrong Number" | Michael Jay, Dorothy Sea Gazeley | 3:50 |
| 2. | "Everything You Do" | Michael Jay | 4:26 |
| 3. | "You've Really Gotten to Me" | Skip Adams, Steve Singer | 4:28 |
| 4. | "Love Will Talk" | Jackie English, Paul Chiten | 3:58 |
| 5. | "(Ain't No) Better Love" | Seth Swirsky, Steve Lunt | 4:04 |
| 6. | "Bounce Back" | Michael Jay, Gregory Smith | 3:53 |
| 7. | "Rescue Me" | Charles Olins, Jeff Pescetto, Steve Dubin | 3:52 |
| 8. | "Kiss Me Quick" | Michael Jay, Martika, Marvin Morrow | 3:28 |
| 9. | "Don't Let Our Love Go" | Alisha, Scott Yahney | 4:22 |
| 10. | "I Need Forever" | Jeff Franzel, Jim Klein | 4:27 |

== Critical reception ==
Professional ratings
Review scores
| Source | Rating |
|---|---|
| Allmusic | 2/5 stars |

Alex Henderson of Allmusic wrote "The little-known CD, produced by Michael Jay, isn't extraordinary by any means, but it does contain some catchy dance-pop tunes, including "Love Will Talk," "Kiss Me Quick" and "(Ain't No) Better Love." However, its best songs are "Wrong Number" and the title song, both of which Jay had co-written and given to dance-pop duo Fire On Blonde in the 1980s. Fire's versions were superior, though Alisha's aren't bad."

== Chart performance ==
| Chart (1990) | Peak position |
|---|---|
| U.S. Billboard 200 Chart | 166 |

== Personnel ==
=== Production and Instrumentation ===
- Arranger - Brad Cole (tracks 2, 6, 10)
- Arranger - Michael Jay (tracks 1, 2, 6, 8)
- Assistant Engineer - Alejandro Rodriguez, Jim Champagne, Neal H. Pogue
- Mastering – Steve Marcussen
- Mixer - Alan Meyerson (tracks 4, 7, 9)
- Mixer - Michael McDonald (tracks 1, 2, 3, 5, 6, 8, 10)
- Producer – Michael Jay
- Recording, Engineer – Michael McDonald
- Background Vocals - Donna De Lory, Mona Lisa Young, Rick Jude Palombi
- Guitar - Teddy Castellucci (tracks 1, 2, 4, 7, 8, 9)
- Keyboards – Brad Cole (tracks 1, 2, 6, 10)
- Drums and Percussion – Michael Jay (tracks 1, 2, 6, 8)
- Vocal Sampling – Marvin Morrow (track 1, 6)
- Arranger, Drum Programming, Keyboards – Claude Gaudette (track 3)
- Saxophone – Jim Oppenheim (track 3)
- Arranger, Drum Programming, Keyboards – Paul Chiten (track 4)
- Arranger, All Instruments – Mark Leggett (track 5)
- Guitar – Mark Leggett (track 6)
- Arranger, Keyboards – Gregory Smith (track 6)
- Arranger, Drum Programming, Keyboards – Steve Dubin (track 7)
- Arranger, Keyboards – Marvin Morrow (track 8)
- Background Vocals – Martika (track 8)
- Arranger, Drum Programming, Keyboards, Trumpet – Alan Satchwell (track 9)
- Additional Keyboards – Brad Cole (track 9)
- Drum Programming – Brad Cole (track 10)
- Guitar – Mark Leggett (track 10)

=== Other ===
- Artwork, Art Direction and Design - JA. Jeanne Bradshaw
- Management – Brian E. Kushner
- Assistant Management – Danielle Juliana
- A&R Coordination – Susan Dodes
- Production Coordinator – Lauren Superstein, Lori Margules
- Photography – Randee St. Nicholas
