= Bounce Back (Fire on Blonde song) =

"Bounce Back" is a song written by Michael Jay and Gregory Smith and originally recorded in 1987 as a demo by American pop singer-songwriter Martika. In 1988, the first version to be released was recorded by the Los Angeles–based duo Fire on Blonde. In 1990, the most commercially successful recording of the song was recorded by American freestyle and dance-pop singer Alisha for her same-titled album Bounce Back.

== Martika version ==
In 1987, American pop singer-songwriter Martika, who had yet to sign with a record label, recorded a demo version of "Bounce Back", and appeared in a low-budget music video which aired on Entertainment '80. Martika would work with Jay on her 1988 debut album.

== Fire on Blonde version ==
"Bounce Back"

Single by Fire on Blonde
- Released: 1988
- Length: 3:29
- Label: Atlantic; Spinn Records
- Songwriters: Michael Jay, Gregory Smith
- Producer: Michael Jay

Fire on Blonde singles chronology
"Wrong Number" (1987)	"Bounce Back" (1988)

"Bounce Back" was recorded in 1987 by the Los Angeles based duo Fire on Blonde, made up of singer Suzie Benson and keyboardist Scott Rudress. The song was released by Atlantic Records as Fire on Blonde's third and final single release in 1988.

Fire on Blonde's version reached number 15 on the US Billboard Hot Dance Music Club Play chart and number 35 on the Hot Dance Music 12-inch Singles Sales chart. The song was also included as part of the soundtrack to the 1988 film Screwball Hotel.

=== Track listing ===
7-inch single

1. "Bounce Back" – 3:29
2. "Bounce Back" (Long Version) – 6:45

12-inch single

1. "Bounce Back" (12" Version) – 6:45
2. "Bounce Back" (Radio Version) – 3:29
3. "Bounce Back" (House Dub) – 5:52
4. "Bounce Back" (7" Remix) – 4:12
5. "Bounce Back" (Acapella) – 3:59

=== Personnel ===
Fire on Blonde

- Suzie Benson – lead vocals
- Scott Rudgress – keyboards

Production

- Michael Jay – producer
- Keith Cohen, Steve Beltran – remixes
- Linda Glick, Wong Design – graphic design

=== Charts ===
Chart (1988)	Peak position
US Hot Dance Music Club Play (Billboard)	15
US Hot Dance Music 12-inch Singles Sales (Billboard)	35

== Alisha version ==
"Bounce Back"

Single by Alisha

from the album Bounce Back
- B-side: "I Need Forever"
- Released: 1990
- Length: 3:53
- Label: MCA
- Songwriters: Michael Jay, Gregory Smith
- Producer: Michael Jay

Alisha singles chronology
"I Don't Know What Comes Over Me" (1988)	"Bounce Back" (1990)	"Wrong Number" (1990)

In 1990, "Bounce Back" was recorded and released by American freestyle and dance-pop singer Alisha. It was released as the lead single from her third studio album, Bounce Back.

Michael Jay produced the entire Bounce Back album and contributed a number of songs for it, including "Bounce Back" and "Wrong Number". "Bounce Back" gave the singer her highest charting position on the US Billboard Hot 100, peaking at number 54. It was also a success in the dance charts, reaching number 10 on the Billboard Hot Dance Music Club Play chart and number 26 on the Hot Dance Music 12-inch Singles Sales chart.

=== Critical reception ===
In a retrospective review of Bounce Back, Alex Henderson of AllMusic said, "Its best songs are 'Wrong Number' and the title song, both of which Jay had co-written and given to dance-pop duo Fire On Blonde in the 1980s. Fire's versions were superior, though Alisha's aren't bad."

=== Track listing ===
7-inch single

1. "Bounce Back" – 3:53
2. "I Need Forever" – 4:27

12-inch single (US release)

1. "Bounce Back" (LP Version) – 3:53
2. "Bounce Back" (7" Radio Remix) – 3:48
3. "Bounce Back" (12" Vocal Remix) – 7:07
4. "Bounce Back" (12" Techno-Bounce Dub) – 7:12

12-inch single (German release)

1. "Bounce Back" (Vocal Remix) – 7:07
2. "Bounce Back" (Radio Remix) – 3:48
3. "Bounce Back" (Techno-Bounce Dub) – 7:12

CD single (US promo)

1. "Bounce Back" (7" Radio Remix) – 3:48
2. "Bounce Back" (LP Version) – 3:53
3. "Bounce Back" (12" Vocal Remix) – 7:07

CD single (German release)

1. "Bounce Back" (LP/7" Version) – 3:53
2. "Bounce Back" (Radio Remix) –:48
3. "Bounce Back" (Vocal Remix) – 7:07
4. "I Need Forever" – 4:27

Cassette single

1. "Bounce Back" (LP Version) – 3:53

=== Charts ===
Chart (1990)	Peak position
US Billboard Hot 100	54
US Dance/Club Play Songs (Billboard)	10
US Hot Dance Music/Maxi-Singles Sales (Billboard)	26
US Cash Box Top 100 Singles	55

=== Personnel ===
- Alisha – lead vocals
- Mark Leggett – guitar
- Brad Cole – keyboards, arranger, drum programming on "I Need Forever"
- Gregory Smith – keyboards, arranger
- Michael Jay – drums, percussion
- Donna DeLory, Mona Lisa Young, Rick Jude Palombi – backing vocals
- Marvin Morrow – vocal sampling

Production

- Michael Jay – producer, arranger
- Hugo Dwyer, Justin Strauss – remixes
- Justin Strauss – additional production
- Eric Kupper – programmer, additional keyboards
- Hugo Dwyer – remix engineer
- Chep Nuñez – editing
- Michael McDonald – mixing, recording, engineer
- Alejandro Rodriguez, Jim Champagne, Neal H. Pogue – assistant engineers
- Steve Marcussen – mastering
