= Alisha (singer) =

American singer (born 1968)

- Born: Alisha Ann Itkin; April 16, 1968 (age 58); Brooklyn, New York, U.S.
- Genres: Freestyle; pop; funk; Italo disco
- Occupation: Singer
- Years active: 1984–1999
- Labels: Vanguard; RCA; MCA; Critique Records; Jellybean Recordings

Alisha Ann Itkin (born April 16, 1968) is an American freestyle and dance-pop singer who had several club hits in the 1980s and 1990s.

== Early life and career ==
Alisha was born on April 16, 1968, in Brooklyn, New York City. At age 8, she began receiving vocal lessons and was coaxed into the music business by her parents, who arranged for studio recording sessions and recitals. At age 14, she joined the rock/dance group The Babysitters in Brooklyn, and recorded a demo that her parents started shopping to various record companies. Vanguard Records brought the tape to producer Mark S. Berry, who had been looking for a vocalist for what would become Alisha's first single "All Night Passion". Released in February 1984, the single became a club hit, peaking at No. 4 on the Hot Dance Club Songs chart. Berry went on to produce her self-titled debut album, which was released in 1985 on Vanguard Records and included additional club hits "Too Turned On" (No. 6 Hot Dance US) and her biggest single to date, "Baby Talk", which reached No. 1 on the Hot Dance charts in December 1985.

In 1987, with the help of Berry, Alisha signed a record deal with RCA Records and released her second album Nightwalkin'. The album, produced by Berry, featured the singles "Into My Secret" (No. 9 Hot Dance US) and "Let Your Heart Make Up Your Mind" (No. 23 Hot Dance US). It also included the song "Do You Dream About Me", which was written by songwriter Diane Warren and was featured in the movie Mannequin. The album failed to chart, and Nightwalkin' was the only album released on RCA.

Alisha prepped for a comeback in 1990, signing a new deal with MCA Records and began working on her third album. MCA's president at the time asked producer Michael Jay (who had produced and co-written "Toy Soldiers" by Martika) if he would work with Alisha on what would become Bounce Back. Jay agreed and went on to produce the entire record. The title track "Bounce Back" was released as the lead single and reached No. 10 on the Hot Dance charts and No. 54 on the Billboard Hot 100 in June 1990. The follow-up single "Wrong Number" failed to chart, and the album peaked at No. 166 on the Billboard Top 200.

After taking a break from releasing music, Alisha recorded and released the single "Wherever The Rhythm Takes Me" on Critique Records. The song, written by Michael Jay and produced by Chris Barbosa, was released on CD and 12" vinyl in September 1996. In November 1999, she released the single "You Wanna Be A Star (Superstar)", produced by Jellybean Benitez and Soul Solution, on Jellybean Recordings, the title song for the Will Ferrell and Molly Shannon movie Superstar. Although not officially released, Alisha re-recorded her first single "All Night Passion" in 2004 with an updated, Hi-NRG production.

== Discography ==
=== Albums ===
Year	Album	US	NED	Record label
1985	Alisha	-	59	Vanguard
1987	Nightwalkin'	-	-	RCA
1990	Bounce Back	166	-	MCA

=== Singles ===
Year	Single	US	U.S. Dance	U.S. R&B	BEL (Fla)	FRA	GER	NED	SWI	UK	Album
1984	"All Night Passion"	103	4	84	-	-	-	37	-	-	Alisha
1985	"Too Turned On"	-	6	-	-	-	-	-	-	-	Alisha
1985	"Baby Talk"	68	1	75	2	19	19	9	23	67	Alisha
1985	"Stargazing"	-	16	-	-	-	-	-	-	-	Alisha
1985	"Boys Will Be Boys"	-	-	-	-	-	-	-	-	-	Alisha
1987	"Into My Secret"	97	9	-	-	-	-	-	-	-	Nightwalkin'
1987	"I Don't Know What Comes Over Me"	-	-	-	-	-	-	-	-	-	Nightwalkin'
1987	"Let Your Heart Make Up Your Mind"	-	23	-	-	-	-	-	-	-	Nightwalkin'
1990	"Bounce Back"	54	10	-	-	-	-	-	-	-	Bounce Back
1990	"Wrong Number"	-	-	-	-	-	-	-	-	-	Bounce Back
1990	"You've Really Gotten to Me"	-	-	-	-	-	-	-	-	-	Bounce Back
1996	"Wherever The Rhythm Takes Me"	-	-	-	-	-	-	-	-	-	Non-album single
1999	"You Wanna Be A Star (Superstar)"	-	-	-	-	-	-	-	-	-	Superstar OST

== See also ==
- List of Number 1 Dance Hits (United States)
- List of artists who reached number one on the US Dance chart
