= Newcleus =

American hip-hop group

- Origin: Brooklyn, New York City, U.S.
- Genres: Electro; boogie; old school hip-hop
- Years active: 1977–1990; 2007–2008; 2014–2019
- Labels: Mayhew; Sunnyview; Rhino; Jam-On
- Members: Yvette "Lady E" Cenac (née Cook); Ben "Cozmo D" Cenac; Monique "Nique D" Crafton (née Angevin)
- Past members: Denise "Niecy D" Williams; Bob "Chilly B" Crafton (deceased)

Newcleus was an American electro and old school hip-hop group that gained popularity in the early 1980s. The group is primarily known for its 12-inch singles "Jam-On's Revenge" (re-released as "Jam on Revenge (The Wikki-Wikki Song)" (1983)) and "Jam on It" (1984).

The group was based in the Bedford-Stuyvesant neighborhood of Brooklyn, New York. Their appearance overlapped with the formative years of hip-hop DJing in the Bronx.

The sequencer line from its 1984 song "Automan" was adapted by German euro-dance project Snap! on the group's 1992 single "Rhythm Is a Dancer", which featured lyrics written and performed by American singer and songwriter Thea Austin as well as hip-hop rhymes by American rapper Turbo B, and became a major international hit.

== History ==
=== Formation ===
A precursor to the group, known as Jam-On Productions, was formed in 1977 in Brooklyn, New York City, and included teenagers Ben "Cozmo D" Cenac and his cousins Monique and Pierre "Pete" Angevin. The group's popularity grew as it played block parties in Brooklyn. By 1979, the primary group's members were Cenac, Yvette "Lady E" Cook (who would later marry Cozmo D), Monique Angevin, and Bob "Chilly B" Crafton (who would later marry Monique Angevin). The coming together of families inspired the name change to Newcleus.

=== Success ===
Newcleus recorded "Jam-On Revenge", a block-party favorite featuring vocals that were sped up. The track impressed record producer Joe Webb, and it became the group's first single in 1983 on Mayhew Records. Retitled as "Jam On Revenge (The Wikki-Wikki Song)", the track reached the top 40 on the U.S. R&B chart. The group eventually signed with Sunnyview Records, which was later acquired by Rhino Records in the 1990s.

The follow-up, "Jam on It," did well on the Billboard Hot 100, reaching No. 56. Both singles began as an anti-hip-hop joke, according to founding member DJ and producer Ben Cenac.

At the time (1981) we were going by the name Positive Messenger and were making music that had a purpose, either messages of love or faith or talking about the conditions of the world. However, we were still doing lots of Hip-Hop jams with our DJ crew Jam-On Productions. So, one of our DJs, Salvador Smooth, kept nagging me to do a rap song. Having come out of Hip-Hop street battles in Brooklyn in the ’70s, I didn't really think much of the Rap records that were playing on the radio, so I figured as a joke I would make a parody jam ... I threw in an idea from an [event] that actually had happened in the ’70s, when a DJ who we had just blown out in a battle said to me "Yeah, you guys are bad, but you can't do this... wikki wikki wikki wikki," meaning how we didn't scratch on the turntables.

I used to play "Jam-On's Revenge" at our parties and it would fill the dance floor, so even though I had never planned to release it, when I was shopping Positive Messenger for a deal I put it on the tape just to fill out space at the end. Turned out it ended up being the track that drove everybody crazy! So, we went with it and changed our names to Newcleus."

A third release, "Computer Age (Push the Button)" reached the R&B top 40. Newcleus released two albums in the mid-1980s, Jam on Revenge and Space Is the Place, although neither sold well. The Cenacs and the Craftons continued to record until 1989.

=== Later years ===
The group released several albums during the following years, but these were the creations of producers putting out material under the Newcleus name. Some of these featured classic Newcleus tracks touted as live versions (but simply added crowd noise atop the original tracks).

In 2005, Cozmo D released Destination Earth: The Definitive Newcleus Recordings, a collection of hip-hop tracks from the group's entire catalog. This collection superseded the Rhino/Atlantic Records compilation Jam on This! The Best of Newcleus. The majority of the songs on this release were restored and remastered from the original master tapes. The definitive versions of the songs "Destination Earth" and "Why" taken from this CD were also released on 12-inch vinyl on the German record label Dominance Electricity. Together with remixes by Sbassship and Reeno, the cover illustrations are by Bill Wray (known for his work on the 1990s cult TV cartoon The Ren & Stimpy Show).

Although the Newcleus albums Jam on Revenge and Space Is the Place were remastered and reissued on CD, the song "Where's the Beat" from Jam on Revenge was removed from the track listing because Sunnyview insisted on including the track on the original album, even though it was not recorded nor produced by the group. These albums were previously available in the United States only on vinyl and audio cassette. However, both albums' original track listing and cover art were also available on CD, manufactured and distributed by Bellaphon Germany, under license from Sunnyview Records, in 1988.

Chilly B died at age 47 of a stroke on February 23, 2010.

== Media appearances ==
"Jam on It" is heard in a Halloween party sequence in Blind, the first of non-fiction filmmaker Frederick Wiseman's four films released in 1986 about the Alabama Institute for the Deaf and Blind. It was also featured in the 1998 film The Wedding Singer.

Newcleus' songs have been used in several video games. "Computer Age" appears in Mat Hoffman's Pro BMX, and "Jam on It" appears in both Dance Dance Revolution Ultramix 2 and DJ Hero 2, the latter featuring a newly re-recorded version of the song.

== Remixes ==
- 2006: "Destination Earth" (Definitive version) — remixes by Sbassship and Reeno; released on Dominance Electricity Records, Germany
- 2018: "Teknology – The Third Millennium Remixes" (Jam-On Recordings)

== Discography ==
=== Albums ===
Year	Album	Peak chart positions			Record label
Year	Album	US	US R&B	UK	Record label
1984	Jam on Revenge	74	15	84	Sunnyview Records
1985	Space Is the Place	―	43	―	Sunnyview Records
1990	Jam on This	―	―	―	Bellaphon Records
"—" denotes releases that did not chart.

=== Compilations ===
- 1993: The Next Generation (Home Base/Hot Productions/Unidisc Records)
- 1997: Jam on This! — The Best of Newcleus (Rhino/Atlantic)
- 1997: Jam for the 90's (Home Base Records)
- 2004: Destination: Earth — The Definitive Newcleus Recordings (Jam-On Productions)
- 2006: Newcleus Classic Double Pack (Deeplay Soultec)

=== Singles ===
Year	Title	Peak chart positions				Album
Year	Title	US	US R&B	US Dance	UK	Album
1983	"Jam on Revenge (The Wikki-Wikki Song)"	―	26	―	44	Jam on Revenge
1984	"Jam on It"	56	9	16	89	Jam on Revenge
1984	"Computer Age (Push the Button)"	―	31	―	―	Jam on Revenge
1984	"Automan"	―	―	―	―	Jam on Revenge
1985	"Destination Earth (1999)"	―	―	―	―	Jam on Revenge
1985	"Space Is the Place"	―	―	―	―	Space Is the Place
1985	"I Wanna Be a B-Boy"	―	74	―	―	Space Is the Place
1985	"Let's Jam"	―	74	―	―	Space Is the Place
1986	"Na Na Beat"	―	77	―	―	Space Is the Place
1987	"Huxtable House Party"	―	―	―	―	—N/a
1988	"She's Bad"	―	―	―	―	—N/a
1988	"We're So Hyped!"	―	―	―	―	—N/a
1990	"Jam on This"	―	―	―	―	Jam on This
1990	"50 Ways to Get Funky"	―	―	―	―	Jam on This
1994	"Trigger"	―	―	―	―	—N/a
"—" denotes releases that did not chart or were not released in that territory.
