= Jam on Revenge =

Studio album by Newcleus
- Released: May 4, 1984
- Genre: Electro
- Labels: Sunnyview; SUN 4901
- Producers: Frank Fair, Joe Webb

Newcleus chronology
Jam on Revenge (1984)	Space is the Place (1985)

Jam on Revenge is the debut studio album by the American group Newcleus. It was released in 1984 by Sunnyview Records. The group was formed originally as Positive Messengers following DJ shows in parks and blocks as Jam-On Productions. Positive Messengers' members were all Christian, which led to them creating songs with a message. Group member Ben “Cozmo D” Cenac attempted to bring some recordings made with Positive Messengers to music labels with little success. Following the lack of success, he was encouraged by a member of Jam On Productions to make a hip hop song, which led to the song "Jam-On's Revenge", a song Cenac described as an anti-hip hop song, as he felt hip hop music of the period was corny.

After bringing the songs "Computer Age" and "Jam-On's Revenge" to Joe Webb, The group then renamed itself Newcleus, and Webb released the single re-titled as "Jam on Revenge," which was released on Webb's label May Hew Records in 1983. The group's music was then brought to Sunnyview Records by Webb, which requested a second hip hop song from the group, which led to them making another hip hop song titled "Jam On It". Following the commercial success of both singles, Sunnyview then suggested recording an album. Cenac and his crew signed a contract that led to them not getting any royalties from the record, while Cenac still managed to get publishing. As the records were developed, the group was locked out of the studio mixing sessions, which were handled by Jonathan Fearing.

== Production ==
=== Background ===
Prior to producing music, a group called Jam-on Productions was doing music shows in Brooklyn performing DJ shows playing funk and disco music. These shows began ending around late 1979, which led to group member Ben “Cozmo D” Cenac to buy a cheap synthesizer and began working on songs with Lady E (Yvette Cook)). By 1980, Cenac along with Al T. (aka MC Harmony) joined Cenac and Cook and a few others to make a hip hop recording called "Freak City Rapping". Cenac sent the release to various labels, which all ignored the tape as they had to leave it for them to listen to, which Cenac did not do as it was his only copy of the song. Cenac eventually went to a label called Reflection, where Joe Webb listened to the recording, stating that he heard something in the song, but it needed better sound quality.

Following the response from Webb, Cenac borrowed money to buy a Tascam Portastudio, which led to collaborations with Bob Crafton, who also went by the name Chilly B. This led to the origination of the group Positive Messenger, which Cenac described as "all deeply Christian, although in a much more spiritual than religious sense."

=== Production ===
Two years later, the group had recorded "Computer Age", and felt it had a hit song on their hand, especially after hearing the success of "Planet Rock". The group was encouraged by Salvadore Smooth, a member of Jam-on Productions, to have the group record a hip hop track. Cenac was not a big fan of hip hop music of the time, finding it corny, but he stated that he was going to make a record similar to that of Parliament and Funkadelic which was an anti-hip hop record that made fun of hip hop, which led to recording "Jam On's Revenge". "Jam-On's Revenge" was only included on the groups demo work as they had space to fill in at the end of their tape.

Cenac sought out Webb again, only to find that Reflection Records had folded, but found Webb through a phone book. Cenac recalled that Webb enjoyed both songs, but particularly "Jam-On's Revenge" As "Jam-On's Revenge" did not reflect Positive Messenger's themes, the group decided to re-name itself Nucleus as the members of the group all lived in the same house. Webb changed the spelling to Newcleus.

"Jam-On's Revenge" was re-recorded in 1982, which Webb released on his own label May Hew Records, where the song was mistitled as "Jam-On Revenge" in 1983. The song grew popular through DJ Jonathan Fearing playing it on weekends on WBLS. This led to Webb making a deal with Sunnyview Records, which had Fearing edit the song to have it arranged similarly to the ones played on the radio. When Sunnyview released the single, it was again mislabeled as "Jam on Revenge". After Fearing helped make "Jam-On Revenge" a hit, Cenac stated that the label "rewarded him by saying his touch is gold and gave him everything. The next thing we knew, he had complete control of our music—once it got in his hands." Cenac recalled that Fearing was "good at mixing, he was fantastic with effects" noting "it's a blessing what he did with "Jam on It" and "Computer Age," yunno, basically he left them alone but he mixed them well and added nice effects." but that "He didn't understand hip hop, and we understood what the streets loved. He knew nothing about the streets; he knew what worked in clubs." Cenac and the rest of Newcleus were not allowed in the mixing room. Cenac and his crew had also signed contracts that gave them no royalties for their music. The publishing was out of Joe Webb's hands, as it was between Cenac and Sunnyview, leading Cenac to attest that he "got songwriting [credits]. So that paid my bills for a long, long time."

The original plan was to have "Computer Age" be the group's second single, but Sunnyview requested a second hip hop song, which led to "Jam on Revenge", a song adapted from rhymes adapted from the days when Jam-On played parties in parks. Following the success of "Jam On It", Sunnyview requested an album from the group. Cenac reflected on the album stating that "a lot of the stuff I wanted to put on the album, I didn't; the record company only wanted dance music."

Among the tracks added was "Where's the Beat" which Cenac stated "wasn't our song", as it was based on the Wendy's commercial that had the catchphrase "Where's the beef?" which led to Webb suggesting them to make the "Where's the Beat" song. Cenac regretting making the recording. Towards the end of production, Cenac recalled that the group felt "disgusted" about how they were treated by the label and cut themselves off from them. They were told by Sunnyview's owners Adam Levy and Henry Stone that they could not be Newcleus anymore but could still go out and produce music.

Fellow cartoonist and comic book artist, and future animator, Bob Camp drew and illustrated the album's cover art.

== Release and reception ==
Professional ratings
Review scores
Source	Rating
The Philadelphia Inquirer	3/4 stars
Pitchfork	8.0/10

Jam on Revenge was released by Sunnyview in 1984. “Computer Age (Push The Button)” was released in August 1984, followed by “I Wanna Be A B-Boy” and “Let's Jam”. The group's second album, Space is the Place, was released in 1985.

Brian Chin of Billboard stated the album was "quite an exemplary project" noting the range of songs, opining that the "atmosphere ranges from speedy ("Computor [sic] Age") to almost moody ("Destination Earth). Our favourite was "Auto Man," sporting a tough beat and a good vocal; also check "Where's the Beat," the one and only even the vaguely funny song of a whole bunch". Chin complimented mixer Jonathan Fearing who "gives the entire album an exceptionally glossy finish." An anonymous reviewer in Cashbox declared the album "a monster debut LP" and that it "shows off simple and effective bass playing and rapping that made "Newcleus a distinctive new sound in a genre rapidly becoming overplayed." Ken Tucker reviewed the album in The Philadelphia Inquirer, giving the album a three out of four stars rating. Tucker compared the group to The Gap Band and Afrika Bambaataa, proclaiming that the group made "tuneful dance music, with a sense of structure and drama that too much dance music lacks. A tad repetitive, though."

== Track listing ==
Track listing and credits are adapted from the sleeve and sticker of Jam on Revenge.

=== Side A ===
1. "Computer Age (Push the Button)" (M.B. Cenac) - 7:35
2. "Auto Man" (Cenac) - 3:49
3. "I'm Not a Robot" (Cenac, Robert Carfton III) - 4:51
4. "Destination Earth" (Cenac, Crafton III) - 5:08

=== Side B ===
1. "Jam On Revenge (Special Re-Mix)" (Cenac) - 6:35
2. "Jam On It" (Cenac) - 6:26
3. "Where's the Beat" (B. Redmon, S. Robert, T. Greene, Joe Webb) - 5:30
4. "No More Running" (Cenac) - 4:58

== Personnel ==
Credits are adapted from the sleeve of Jam on Revenge.

- Jay Mark – engineer (on "Computer Age (Push the Button)", "I'm Not a Robot", and "Where's the Beat")
- Jim Dougherty – engineer (on "Auto Man", "Destination Earth", "No More Runnin")
- Jonathan Fearing – mixing
- Frank Fair – producer and selector
- Joe Webb – producer and selector
- Bob Camp – cover art
- Pat Redding – cover art
- Don Hunstein – back cover photography

== See also ==
- 1984 in hip hop music
