= You're So Vain =

1972 single by Carly Simon

- Side A of US single

Single by Carly Simon

from the album No Secrets
- B-side: "His Friends Are More Than Fond of Robin"
- Released: November 1972
- Recorded: 1972
- Studio: Trident
- Genre: Soft rock; folk rock; pop
- Length: 4:19
- Label: Elektra
- Songwriter: Carly Simon
- Producer: Richard Perry

Carly Simon singles chronology
"Legend in Your Own Time" (1971)	"You're So Vain" (1972)	"The Right Thing to Do" (1973)

Music video
- "You're So Vain" on YouTube (2010)

"You're So Vain" is a song by the American singer-songwriter Carly Simon, released as a single in November 1972. The lyrics describe a self-absorbed lover, whose identity has long been a matter of speculation. Simon said the song refers to three men, one of whom she has named publicly—the actor Warren Beatty.

Simon wrote "You're So Vain" over the course of a year. The song was originally titled "Bless You, Ben." The bass guitar introduction was played by Klaus Voormann. The strings were arranged by Simon and orchestrated by Paul Buckmaster.

In early 1973, "You're So Vain" reached No. 1 in the United States, Canada, Australia, and New Zealand. In 1994, it was ranked 72nd in the Billboard 50th anniversary all-time chart. At the 16th Annual Grammy Awards in 1974, it was nominated for Song of the Year, Record of the Year, and Best Female Pop Vocal Performance. It was voted No. 216 in RIAA's Songs of the Century, and in August 2014, the UK's Official Charts Company named it the ultimate song of the 1970s. In 2021, the song was ranked 495th on Rolling Stone's 500 Greatest Songs of All Time.

== Lyrics ==
Before Simon rewrote the lyrics, the song was titled "Bless You, Ben". She first rewrote the chorus lyric "You're so vain / You probably think this song is about you". A year later, she saw a man wearing a scarf arrive at a party and study himself in a mirror. A friend of Simon's said that "he looks like he's walking onto a yacht", inspiring the rest of the lyrics.

Simon used the word "gavotte", a French dance, as it provided a necessary rhyme and "that's what a pretentious, vain man would do". The line "They were clouds in my coffee" was inspired by a comment from her piano player, Billy Mernit, who observed that clouds were reflected in a cup of coffee she was drinking.

The lyrics "Well, I hear you went up to Saratoga, and your horse naturally won / Then you flew your Learjet up to Nova Scotia, to see the total eclipse of the sun" may refer to the solar eclipse of March 7, 1970, that was visible along the east coast of North America, or the solar eclipse of July 10, 1972, which was only visible in northern and eastern Canada. Simon told the CBC that she took artistic license with the reference, and the subject may not have actually witnessed the eclipse in Nova Scotia. In the 2012 biography More Room in a Broken Heart: The True Adventures of Carly Simon, she stated: "I didn't know anyone who raced at Saratoga or went to view the total eclipse of the sun. I just wanted to portray someone who thought he was ultra-cool."

=== Subject ===
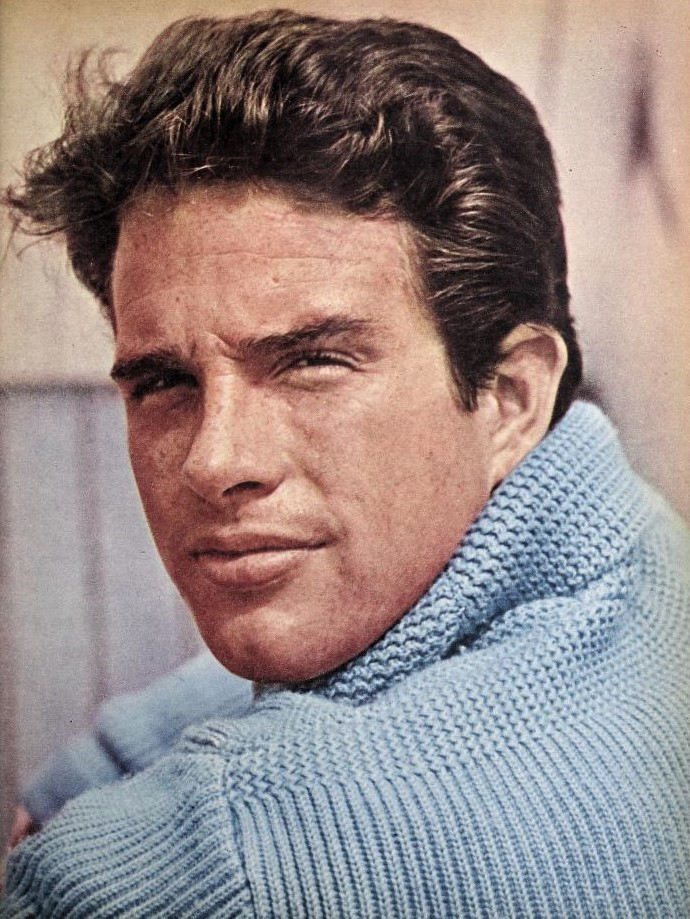
Simon confirmed that the actor Warren Beatty (pictured in 1961) was one inspiration for the lyrics.

In 1972, Simon told an interviewer that the song was about "men", not a specific man. In 1983, she said it was not about Mick Jagger, who contributed uncredited backing vocals to the song (Simon said she invited him to join the recording when he made a call into the studio.) In a 1993 book, Angie Bowie said she was the "wife of a close friend" mentioned in the song, and that Jagger had been "obsessed" with her.

Simon appeared as a guest artist on Janet Jackson's 2001 single "Son of a Gun (I Betcha Think This Song Is About You)", which sampled "You're So Vain". In "Son of a Gun", Simon recites the lines "The apricot scarf was worn by Nick / Nothing in the words referred to Mick." "Nick" is the novelist Nicholas Delbanco, whom Simon dated in the 1960s. Simon also denied that the song was about her ex-husband James Taylor. David Bowie, David Cassidy and Cat Stevens have been cited by the press as other possibilities.

In August 2003, Simon agreed to reveal the subject to the highest bidder of the Martha's Vineyard Possible Dreams charity auction. The highest bid was $50,000 from Simon's friend Dick Ebersol, the president of NBC Sports. A condition of the prize was that Ebersol not reveal the name. Simon allowed him to divulge a clue, and he said the person's name contained the letter E. In 2004, Simon said the name also contained the letters A and R. In 2005, Simon's ex-husband, Jim Hart, said he was sure the song was not about anyone famous.

In her 2008 book Girls Like Us, Sheila Weller includes a detailed account of Simon's love affair with the musician Dan Armstrong, suggesting that he was the inspiration. However, Simon's heartbreak over losing him inspired the song "Dan, My Fling", which appeared on her first album. After her 2014 interview on his radio show, Howard Stern said Simon had privately revealed the identity to him, saying, "There is an odd aspect to it... He's not that vain." He also said it was a composite of three people. Simon confirmed that she had given the names to a few people, including Stern.

In an interview for WNYC in November 2009, Simon said she had hidden the name of the subject in a new recording of the song. In 2010, a representative for Simon said the name was "David". Media outlets speculated that the subject was the Elektra Records executive David Geffen. Hart immediately downplayed this. Simon later claimed she had not met Geffen when she wrote the song in 1971. Simon's publicist confirmed the song was not about Geffen, but that there was "a David who is connected to the song in some way, shape, or form". Vanity Fair noted that in addition to "David", "Warren" and an unintelligible name are whispered in the song. After her performance of the song with Simon in July 2013, the songwriter Taylor Swift said that Simon had revealed the identity of the subject to her in confidence.

In 1983, Simon said the actor Warren Beatty "certainly thought it was about him—he called me and said thanks for the song". In 2007, Beatty said, "Let's be honest. That song was about me." In November 2015, Simon, promoting her memoirs, said, "I have confirmed that the second verse is Warren ... Warren thinks the whole thing is about him ... Now, that doesn't mean that the other two verses aren't also about Warren. It just means that the second one is." The song originally had a fourth verse, possibly including another subject.

== Reception ==
Reviewing the single, Record World called it Simon's "most commercial song yet", praising the lyrics, melody and string arrangements. At the 16th Annual Grammy Awards in 1974, "You're So Vain" was nominated for Song of the Year, Record of the Year, and Best Female Pop Vocal Performance.

In 1994, "You're So Vain" was ranked 72nd in the Billboard 50th anniversary all-time chart. It was voted No. 216 in RIAA's Songs of the Century, and in 2014 the UK Official Charts Company named it the ultimate song of the 1970s. In 2021, it was ranked 495th on Rolling Stone's 500 Greatest Songs of All Time. In June 2026, CBS News included the song in its list of the 250 most essential American songs of the past 250 years.

== Sales ==
The song was a No. 1 hit in the United States, Canada, Australia, and New Zealand, and reached No 4 in Ireland and South Africa. Entering at No. 99 on the Billboard Hot 100 on 2 December 1972, the song took five more weeks to rise to the top of the chart, where it stayed for the first three weeks of 1973. It was replaced by Stevie Wonder's "Superstition" and spent the next month in the runner-up spot. It also spent two weeks at the top of the Easy Listening chart in early 1973, her first No. 1 on either chart. "You're So Vain" was Simon's breakthrough hit in the United Kingdom, reaching No. 3 on the UK chart on its original release in 1973.

== 2010 music video ==
In February 2010, to coincide with the release of her album Never Been Gone, Simon invited fans and filmmakers to create the world's first music video for the song. Among the rules was that the video had to incorporate at least some elements from the new version. A template of optional tools, including green screen footage that was newly-shot at that time, stills, video blogs and more, was created to help the participants.

Participants had from February 8 until midnight April 15 to submit their entries, with Simon being responsible for screening and judging all. The winner would receive $10,000, have the entry premiered at the Tribeca Festival on April 29 to meet Simon in person, be featured on AOL Music, and win prizes from Simon's personal archives. Five finalists were selected from which Brett Bisogno was selected as the winner.

Bisogno's video depicts himself as a bearded man in a long overcoat, walking and skipping around in various New York City locations, including Columbia University. He returns home to pick up a cherry pie made by his wife (Karen Bollaert). All the while, Simon appears in many green-screened sequences. Other than a brief moment where the recording of the song switches to the new version, a minute into the song, the video shows 66-year-old Simon lip-syncing to her 29-year-old voice, and miming the acoustic guitar originally played by Jimmy Ryan.

== Personnel ==
- Carly Simon – lead vocals, backing vocals, acoustic piano, string arrangement
- Jimmy Ryan – guitars
- Klaus Voormann – bass
- Jim Gordon – drums
- Richard Perry – percussion
- Paul Buckmaster – orchestration
- Mick Jagger – backing vocals
- Vicki Brown – backing vocals
- Liza Strike – backing vocals

== Track listing ==
7" single

- "You're So Vain" – 4:25
- "His Friends Are More Than Fond of Robin" – 3:00

== Charts ==
=== Weekly charts ===
Chart (1972–1973)	Peak position
Australia (Kent Music Report)	1
Belgium (Ultratop 50 Flanders)	5
Belgium (Ultratop 50 Wallonia)	14
Canada Top Singles (RPM)	1
Canada Adult Contemporary (RPM)	1
Finland (Suomen virallinen lista)	25
Ireland (IRMA)	4
Netherlands (Dutch Top 40)	9
Netherlands (Single Top 100)	7
Japan (Oricon)	11
New Zealand (Listener)	1
Quebec (ADISQ)	4
South Africa (Springbok Radio)	4
UK Singles (OCC)	3
US Billboard Hot 100	1
US Adult Contemporary (Billboard)	1
West Germany (GfK)	8

=== Year-end charts ===
Chart (1973)	Position
Australia (Kent Music Report)	3
Belgium (Ultratop Flanders)	59
Canada Top Singles (RPM)	8
Netherlands (Dutch Top 40)	93
Netherlands (Single Top 100)	78
US Billboard Hot 100	9
US Adult Contemporary (Billboard)	24
US Cash Box Top 100	7

=== All-time charts ===
Chart (1958–2018)	Position
US Billboard Hot 100	92

== Certifications and sales ==
Certifications for "You're So Vain"
Region	Certification	Certified units/sales
Denmark (IFPI Danmark)	Gold	45,000^{‡}
Italy (FIMI)	Gold	50,000^{‡}
Japan	—	187,500
New Zealand (RMNZ)	4× Platinum	120,000^{‡}
Spain (Promusicae)	Gold	30,000^{‡}
United Kingdom (BPI)	2× Platinum	1,200,000^{‡}
United States (RIAA)	Gold	1,000,000^{^}
^{^} Shipments figures based on certification alone.^{‡} Sales+streaming figures based on certification alone.

== Awards ==
Year	Award	Category	Work	Recipient	Result	Ref.
1974	Grammy Awards	Record of the Year	"You're So Vain"	Carly Simon	Nominated	
1974	Grammy Awards	Song of the Year	"You're So Vain"	Carly Simon	Nominated	
1974	Grammy Awards	Best Pop Vocal Performance, Female	"You're So Vain"	Carly Simon	Nominated	

- "You're So Vain" was inducted into the Grammy Hall of Fame in 2004.

== Chocolate Starfish version ==
In 1993, Australian rock band Chocolate Starfish covered the song as their debut single from their self-titled debut album. The single reached No. 11 in Australia and No. 29 in New Zealand.

== "Son of a Gun" ==
In 2001, Simon collaborated with Janet Jackson on "Son of a Gun (I Betcha Think This Song Is About You)", a track which uses elements of "You're So Vain".

== See also ==
- List of Billboard Hot 100 number-one singles of 1973
- List of number-one adult contemporary singles of 1973 (U.S.)
- List of number-one singles in Australia during the 1970s
- List of RPM number-one singles of 1973
- "You Oughta Know", a song with another mystery subject
