= Tim Kramer =

American pornographic actor (1958–1992)

- Born: Douglas Murrell Cooper; February 2, 1958; Milton, West Virginia
- Died: April 16, 1992 (aged 34); Columbus, Ohio
- Occupation: Pornographic film actor
- Years active: 1980–1988

Douglas Murrell Cooper (February 2, 1958 – April 16, 1992), known professionally as Tim Kramer, was a gay porn star, escort and health business owner best known for his role in the 1983 homoerotic film Gayracula.

== Early life ==
Douglas Cooper was born on February 2, 1958, in Milton, Cabell County, West Virginia. Later, he attended high school in Columbus, Ohio, and upon graduation moved to Fort Lauderdale, Florida, where he began to model for Target Studios.

== Career ==
Later, he moved to San Francisco, where he continued his career working for Falcon Studios. Among the early films he appeared are Ship Shape and Blackout for Target Studios and Biker Liberty for Falcon Studios. During the late seventies and early eighties, he made about a dozen feature-length films including Big Summer Surprise, Style, Giants II, Gayracula, I Do, Tony's Initiation, Men of the Midway, Heroes, Trick Time, Sun Stroke, and New Zealand Undercovers.

== Filmography ==
- Style (1981)
- Biker's Liberty (1982)
- Pegasus (1982)
- Biker's Liberty: Big Summer Surprise (1983)
- Giants II (1983)
- Gayracula (1983)
- Men of the Midway (1983)
- Tony's Initiation (1983)
- I Do (1984)
- Heroes (1984)
- Trick Time (1984)
- Sun Stroke (1986)
- New Zealand Undercovers (1987)
- Young Men Of The 80's 2 (2002, released posthumously)

== Later life and death ==
In a 1988 Advocate interview, Cooper spoke openly of the escort service he ran in Hollywood for many years: "That's where I made most of the money. I don't do drugs or liquor, so I used the (film) business to build up my name, so I could charge more money on the side in my escort service." He attempted to invest his earnings in a solar installation company but that never took off. In time parlayed into a partnership with fellow skin star Ron Pearson to found Pegasus Productions. The partnership produced only one film, Pegasus which featured the founders. By the late 1980s, Cooper made fewer films and concentrated most of his energy on a health food store in West Hollywood. It was during this time he was diagnosed HIV+, and he commented thus: "I'm in a business now that's health oriented. We're an AIDS support group, promote safe sex, and are here to try and give something back to the community and help people who are HIV+ or have AIDS. So I can't be involved in unsafe sex in front of a camera, because that says it's okay. It would make me look like a hypocrite."

Kramer died on April 16, 1992, at Doctors Hospital North in Columbus, Ohio. The cause of death was listed as AIDS complications. He is buried in the Chestnut Grove Baptist Church Cemetery, Cabell County, West Virginia.
