= Craig Harnath =

Australian musician

- Birth name: Craig Norman Harnath
- Occupations: Musician; producer; engineer; songwriter
- Instrument: Bass guitar

Craig Norman Harnath is an Australian musician who was the founding mainstay bass guitarist of the pop and new wave musical group Kids in the Kitchen from 1983 to 1988. As a songwriter he co-wrote the B-side "Glad to Be Alive" of Kylie Minogue's debut single "Locomotion" (1987). Since 1988, he has worked as an engineer, producer and mixer. Harnath was briefly the bass guitarist for rock music group Chocolate Starfish (1992–1993). He co-composed the soundtrack for the Australian comedy-drama film The Castle (1997). He also worked on the soundtracks for ABC-TV shows Frontline (1994) and Funky Squad (1995).
