= Mark S. Berry =

American producer

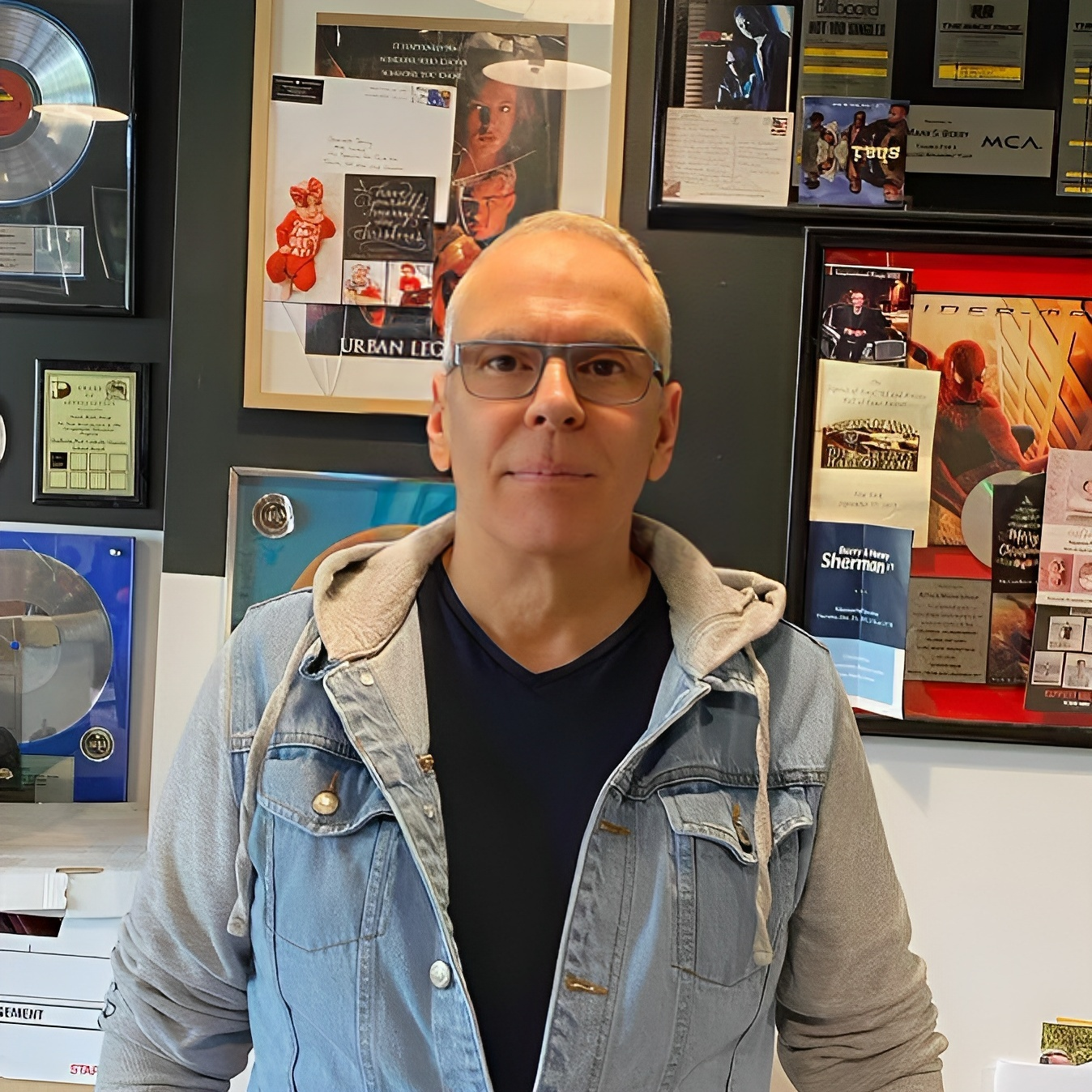
- Born: Northampton, Massachusetts, U.S.
- Occupations: Record producer; film producer

Mark S. Berry is an American record and film producer, and the chairman of AMG. He has worked with Grammy and Juno nominated artists such as Carly Simon, Paul McCartney, David Bowie, Duran Duran, Billy Idol, Boy George, Yes, Joan Jett, Cameo, Voivod and Kool & the Gang.

Berry has attained 36 international gold and platinum record awards for the artists he has worked with as a producer, engineer and mixer.

== Biography ==
Mark S. Berry was born in Northampton, Massachusetts, and raised in Brooklyn, New York City. In his school years he started making recordings for basement bands in Manhattan.

In 1970, he entered the Institute of Audio Research (IAR) in Manhattan, graduating in 1972.

After graduating from high school (in the same year) in June 1972, he moved to London, UK. He started to work as an assistant engineer at AIR Studios under the tutelage of Sir George Martin and Paul McCartney on the Live & Let Die James Bond soundtrack. His first major engineering assignment and very first credit was Carly Simon's "No Secrets" album. The song "You're So Vain" from this album was Grammy nominated in 1973 for Song of The Year, Record of The Year & Best Vocal Performance. The song is ranked at No. 92 on Billboard's Greatest Songs of All Time. "You're So Vain" was also voted No. 216 in RIAA's Songs of the Century, and in August 2014, the UK's Official Charts Company crowned it the ultimate song of the 1970s. In 2021, "You're So Vain" was ranked #495 by Rolling Stone Magazine as one of the top 500 Greatest Songs of All Time.

Returning to New York City in 1976, he took a position as Staff Engineer/Mixer and A & R Producer for Vanguard Records. Working there for 12 years, he became interested in hip-hop culture and worked with several artists of the early NY hip-hop movement, including Afrika Bambaataa & Soul Sonic Force, Arthur Baker & John Robie.

In early 1981, while engineering & mixing numerous dance hits at Vanguard Records, Mark met a young New York-based writer/producer named Bobby Orlando, aka Bobby "O". Mark signed him to Vanguard Records after referring him to A&R VP Danny Weiss. Mark engineered and/or mixed many Bobby "O" Vanguard productions & recordings including:

- "Desire", "(The Best Part of) Breakin' Up" – Roni Griffith
- "Passion", "Calling All Boys", "Danger", "Jukebox – Don't Put Another Dime" – The Flirts
- "Native Love (Step by Step)", "Walk Like a Man" – Divine
- "She Has A Way", "Attraction", "I'm So Hot For You" – Bobby "O"

Mark was regarded as an innovator in the hi-NRG genre for developing this signature sound; utilizing a powerful pulsating beat, new wave-style vocals and heavy synthesized bass, cowbells, and the signature tribal temple/wood blocks. The ringing cowbell percussion lines and robotic sequencers heard in "She Has A Way," "The Best Part of Breakin' Up," and "Native Love (Step By Step)" have been described as defining the Bobby "O" trademark sound. Mark's engineering & mixing has influenced various Eurodisco, Tropical House, Techno, Italo-disco, Electronic ("EDM"), and Hi-NRG releases internationally. He has been cited by music historians for his contribution to dance music.

In the mid to late 1980s he started making international dance remixes and worked as a producer of major international recording acts.

In 1991, Mark S. Berry relocated to Toronto and started his work in rock production after signing with Steve Scharf Management. His Canadian productions have included I Mother Earth, two platinum albums for The Headstones, The Killjoys, Nothing In Particular, Fence, Burton Cummings (The Guess Who) live concert platinum solo effort, "Up Close & Alone".

He started attending Innis College, University of Toronto, for an undergraduate program in cinema studies. In 2013, Mark was a keynote speaker at MIDEM '13 Conference in Cannes, France, and Music Industry China (MIC) in Taipei, Taiwan.

Since 2019, Mark has been appointed as a judge for the Short Film category at the Global Short Film Awards in conjunction with the Cannes Film Festival in Cannes, France. He was named to the jury at the 2022 Global Short Film Awards. Mark is also a guest judge and named to jury at the LaJolla Fashion and Film Awards in LaJolla, California for the 2019 & 2022 season.

In September 2019 Mark was inducted into the dance music industry's, Legends of Vinyl – Hall of Fame with an award for his body of work Producing, Engineering & Mixing some of the biggest dance hits of the 70's & 80's.

Mark and AMG have ventured into the feature length film production business as Executive Producers of the 2015 live concert docu-film from rap superstar Drake with "Drake: Homecoming", released internationally through the AMC theatres specialty division, Specticast.

A Shudder channel original feature, "The Sacrifice Game" names AMG executives Mark S. Berry & Duane Farley as Executive Producers along with Philip Kalin-Hajdu & Albert Melamed…AMG is also Music Supervising. The film stars Mena Massoud (Alladin), Madison Baines (Transplant), Olivia Scott Welch (Fear Street), Chloe Devine (Depraved) & directed by Jenn Wexler.

Mark is also Executive Producer of the feature film, CryptoHeads, slated for 2022 release on streaming networks.

In June 2022, Mark announced his upcoming Spring 2023 book release of Risking Nothing Would be Way too Risky for Me.

== AMG ==
Mark started his AMG business activity in 1998 with startup capital from the music publishing division of Canadian film giant Alliance Atlantis. He launched AMG as a media company to sign and promote artists and insert music into film streaming content. The company is based in Toronto, Canada and has satellite offices in the US (NYC), Hong Kong, China (Beijing), South Korea (Seoul).

AMG is divided into several departments:

- AMG Brand Relations;
- AMG Label Services;
- AMG Artist Management;
- AMG Visuals;
- AMG Music Licensing & Publishing.

The two main music publishing divisions are 50% owned by international music conglomerate BMG Rights Management (New York).

In 2015, the AMG Visuals department Executive Produced Drake's live AMC concert film "Drake: Homecoming".

AMG music distribution is done through affiliate divisions of Sony Music and Universal Music Group.

AMG partnered with the AttackTrax music supervision agency to expand their music into film/TV services.

In 2015, the company started its partnership with Shanghai Media Group (China). In October 2021, the company partnered with Factory Film Studio and started feature film co-productions.

=== Discography ===
Artist	Credit	Album	Label
Burton Cummings	Producer/Mixer/Platinum	Up Close And Alone	Universal
Punch Buggy	Producer/Mixer	My Norwegian Cousin	Sour/Sony
Popgun Picnic	Producer/Mixer	Stinks Like Truth	Independent
Blasternaut	Producer/Mixer	Eden Pit	Attack
Sicboy	Producer/Mixer	Artificial Flavors	Attack
Vertical Creep	Producer/Mixer	Vertical Creep	Attack
Pop Cherry	Producer/Mixer	Straight Up	Deevel
Teenage Head	Producer/Mixer	Head Disorder	Loudrock
Headstones	Producer/Mixer/Platinum	Teeth and Tissue	Universal
Spirit Pushers	Producer/Mixer	Time, Light, Shine, Free	a-Rabian
Fence	Producer/Mixer	No Dumping	a-Rabian
Sisters Cherrie	Producer/Mixer	I Think Therefore, I'm Fuct	a-Rabian
Bootsauce	Remixer	Bootsauce	Polygram
Voivod	Producer/Mixer	The Outer Limits	Universal
Headstones	Producer/Mixer/Platinum Album/Double Platinum Single	Picture Of Health – "When Something Stands For Nothing"	Universal
Michelin Slave	Producer/Mixer	Poised To Meet The Maker	Magada
Love Chain	Producer/mixer	Burn	Universal
Lee Aaron	Producer/mixer/Double Platinum Single	Emotional Rain – "Odds of Love "	A&M
Nothing In Particular	Producer/Mixer	Is That Right?	Kinetic
The Killjoys	Additional Producer/Mixer	Starry	Warners
I Mother Earth	Producer/Mixer	I Mother Earth	Indie
Joan Jett	Producer/Mixer	Good Music	Sony
Mighty Mighty Bosstones	12/7" Mixer	Last Dead Mouse	Polygram
Talk Talk	Gold LP/U.K.	* Life's What You Make It	EMI
David Bowie	12/7" Mixer Platinum LP/U.S	* Never Let Me Down	EMI
Duran Duran	12/7" Mixer Platinum LP/U.S	* Meet El Presidente Proposition	EMI
Yes	12/7" Mixer Platinum LP/U.S	* Big Generator – "Rhythm Of Love"	ATCO
Billy Idol	12/7" Mixer Platinum LP/U.S	*Flesh For Fantasy	Chrysalis
Haywire	Producer/mixer	Get Off	ATTIC
Pseudo Echo	Producer/Mixer	2× Platinum/Australia Gold Canada Gold USA LOVE AN ADVENTURE "Love an Adventure" "Don't Go" "Living in a Dream" Also includes "Funky Town" Remixer (Top 5 U.S.)	EMI Australia BMG Int.
Kids in the Kitchen	Mixer Platinum LP/U.S	SHINE "Current Stand" (Top 10 AUS.) "Revolution Love	Mushroom/Aus. SIRE/USA
Animotion	Mixer Platinum LP/U.S.	*Obsession	Polygram
Indecent Obsession	Producer/Mixer	Gold Single/Australia Platinum/Australia SPOKEN WORDS "Say Goodbye" "Come Back to Me" (Top 5 Australia)	Universal
The Chantoozies	Producer/Mixer/Platinum Australia	Wanna Be Up (Top 5 Australia) "Kiss and Tell" (Top 10 Australia)	Mushroom
Joan Jett	12"/Mixer	*Cherry Bomb	Universal
Jimmy Barnes	12"/Mixer Platinum/Australia	Seven Days	Mushroom/Greffen
The Black Sorrows	12"/Mixer Platinum/Australia	Never Let Me Go	Sony Australia
Jaki Graham	12"/Mixer	*Set Me Free	EMI U.K.
The Eurogliders	Producer/mixer	Dreamin – If You Don't Know	Sony Australia
Kool & The Gang	12/7"/mixer Platinum LP	*Fresh-*Emergency-Mislead	Polygram
Love & Money	12"/Mixer	River of People	Phonogram
Machinations	Producer/Mixer 12" Mixer	Cars & Planes-Do to you	Mushroom
Jayne Reyne	12"/Mixer	*Inside a Dream	EMI
Boy George	12"/Mixer	Rip It Up	EMI Australia
Until December	Producer/Mixer	*Secrets I Won't Tell	415/CBS
The Kane Gang	12/7" Mixer	Gold LP *Respect Yourself	London/UK
Scarlett & Black	12/7" Mixer	* "You Don't Know	Virgin
Anabella (BowWowWow)	12/Mixer	War Boys	RCA/UK
Ian Dury & the Blockheads	12"/Mixer	Sex & Drugs" "Hit Me" "Wake Up	donnée L4-D
Nick Heyward	12/7" Mixer	Warning Sign	Arista/UK
Mink Deville	12"/Mixer	Italian Shoes	Polygram
Nona Hendryx	12/7" Mixer	*Baby-Go-Go	EMI
Cameo	12" Mixer	LP *She's Strange	Polygram
Stephanie Mills	12/7" Mixer	Gold LP * Medicine Song	Polygram
Gwen Guthrie	12/7" Mixer	Gold LP Nothin' Goin on but the Rent	Polygram
Rene & Angela	12/7" Mixer	*I'll be Good	Polygram
The Bar-kays	12/7" Mixer	*Sexomatic- *Your Place or Mine-*Dance your body	Polygram
Confunkshun	12/7" Mixer	*Burnin' Love-*She's Sweet-*Tell me what I'm Gonna Do	Epic
Marilyn	12"Mixer	"Spirit in the Sky"	Epic
Loose Ends	12"Mixer	Gotta Get your Body Movin'	Virgin/UK
Freeze	Producer Mixer	2-LP Cuts	Beggars/Banquet UK

" * " = Top Ten Billboard Dance

Theme from Dune – TOTO (Polygram) Mixed the title theme from this David Lynch film; performed by the pop-rock band TOTO and the Vienna Philharmonic Orchestra. Mannequin – "Do You Dream About Me" -ALISHA (BMG), produced and mixed this Dianne Warren song for the main dance sequence in this blockbuster film. Knights of the City (New World) – Musical Supervisor and soundtrack producer for this feature-length film. Soundtrack included artists such as Smokey Robinson and Stevie Wonder. Gotcha – JOAN JETT (Sony). Mixed the title theme for this feature-length film. Co-mixed with song producers Jimmy Iovine (Interscope Records – CEO) and Kenny Laguna.

=== Executive producer discography ===
Artist	Credit	Title	Label
Mr.Spike	Executive Producer	Beer Can Alley	ATTACK
The Clockhouse	Executive Producer	Every Android That I Know	ATTACK
Adam & Eve (Feature Film) Soundtrack	Executive Producer	Original Motion Picture Soundtrack	ATTACK/Lions Gate
Echoface	Executive Producer	Echoface	ATTACK
