= Ben Kingsley on screen and stage =

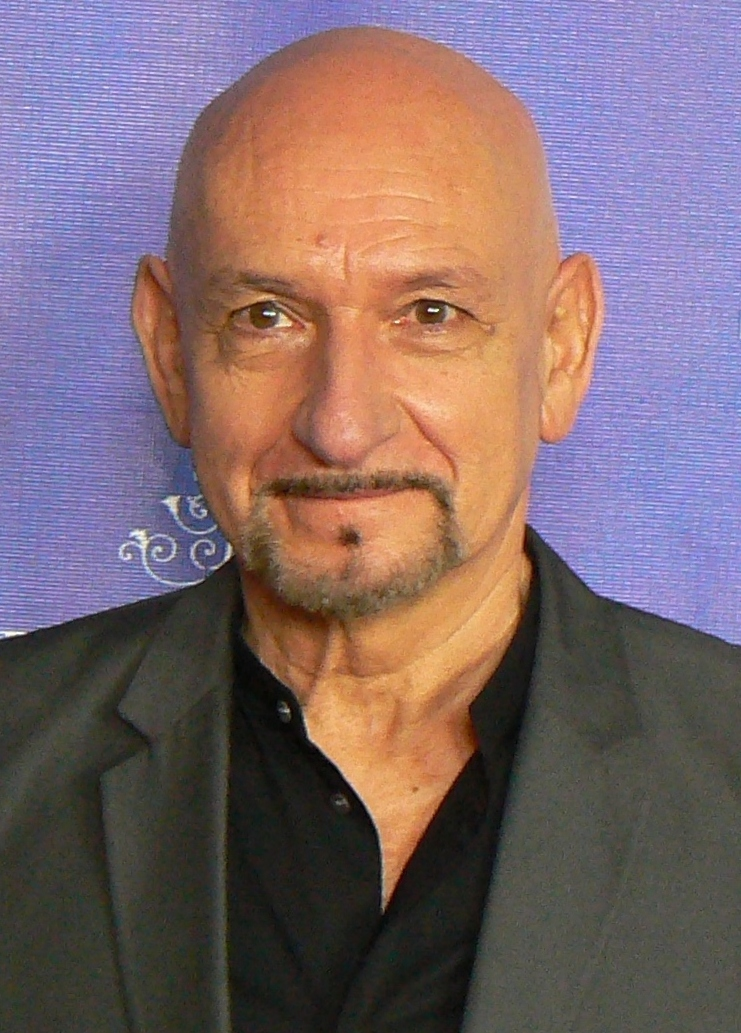
Kingsley at the 2012 Santa Barbara International Film Festival

Sir Ben Kingsley is a British actor known for his extensive career on stage and screen. He has received numerous accolades throughout his career which spans over five decades, including an Academy Award, BAFTA Award, Grammy Award, two Golden Globe Awards, and a Screen Actors Guild Award, in addition to nominations for four Primetime Emmy Awards, and two Laurence Olivier Awards.

Kingsley started his career on stage when he joined the Royal Shakespeare Company in 1967, where he starred in numerous productions of William Shakespeare including King Lear (1968), Bartholomew Fair (1969), Measure for Measure (1970), The Tempest (1970), Hamlet (1975), The Merry Wives of Windsor (1979), and Othello (1985). He made his Broadway debut playing Demetrius in A Midsummer Night's Dream (1971). He portrayed the title role in Edmund Kean (1983) on both the West End at the Aldwych Theatre and on Broadway at the Billy Rose Theater.

He is best known for starring as Mohandas Gandhi in the film Gandhi (1982), for which he won the Academy Award for Best Actor. He expanded his career in film earning acclaim for his performances in Maurice (1987), Bugsy (1990), Schindler's List (1993), Sexy Beast (2000), House of Sand and Fog (2003), Elegy (2008), Shutter Island (2010), and Hugo (2011). Other notable films include Sneakers (1992), Searching for Bobby Fischer (1993), Dave (1993), Death and the Maiden (1994), Twelfth Night (1996), Tuck Everlasting (2002), and Learning to Drive (2014). He portrayed Trevor Slattery in the Marvel Cinematic Universe, acting in Iron Man 3 (2013), All Hail the King (2014), Shang-Chi and the Legend of the Ten Rings (2021), and the Disney+ series Wonder Man (2026). He also acted in the blockbusters Prince of Persia: The Sands of Time (2010), Ender's Game (2013). He voiced roles in The Boxtrolls (2014), and The Jungle Book (2016).

On television, Kingsley has portrayed numerous real life figures including Simon Wiesenthal in the HBO film Murderers Among Us: The Simon Wiesenthal Story (1989), Potiphar in the TNT miniseries Joseph (1995), Otto Frank in the ABC miniseries Anne Frank: The Whole Story (2001), and Herman Tarnower in the HBO film Mrs. Harris (2005). He also played Sweeney Todd in the TV film The Tale of Sweeney Todd (1997), and Ay, the Grand Vizier in the miniseries Tut (2015).

== Film ==
Key
†	Denotes films that have not yet been released

Year	Title	Role	Notes
1972	Fear Is the Key	Royale	
1982	Gandhi	Mahatma Gandhi	
1983	Betrayal	Robert	
1985	Silas Marner	Silas Marner	
1985	Harem	Selim	
1986	Turtle Diary	William Snow	
1987	Maurice	Lasker-Jones	
1988	Pascali's Island	Basil Pascali	
1988	Without a Clue	Dr. John Watson	
1988	Testimony — The Story of Shostakovich	Dmitri Shostakovich	
1989	Slipstream	Avatar	
1990	The 5th Monkey	Cunda	
1990	A Violent Life	Governor	
1991	Bugsy	Meyer Lansky	
1991	Necessary Love	Ernesto	
1992	Sneakers	Cosmo	
1992	Freddie as F.R.O.7	Freddie the Frog	Voice
1993	Searching for Bobby Fischer	Bruce Pandolfini	
1993	Dave	Vice-President Gary Nance	
1993	Schindler's List	Itzhak Stern	
1994	Death and the Maiden	Dr. Roberto Miranda	
1995	Species	Xavier Fitch	
1996	Twelfth Night	Feste	
1997	The Assignment	Amos	
1997	Photographing Fairies	Minister Templeton	
1999	The Confession	Harry Fertig	
1999	Parting Shots	Renzo Locatelli	
1999	CNN Millennium	Narrator	
2000	Spooky House	The Great Zamboni	
2000	What Planet Are You From?	Graydon	
2000	Rules of Engagement	Ambassador Mourain	
2000	Islam: Empire of Faith	Narrator	Voice; Documentary
2000	Sexy Beast	Don Logan	
2001	A.I. Artificial Intelligence	Specialist	Voice
2001	Triumph of Love	Hermocrates	
2002	Tuck Everlasting	Man in the Yellow Suit	
2003	House of Sand and Fog	Massoud Behrani	
2004	Thunderbirds	"The Hood"	
2004	Suspect Zero	Benjamin O'Ryan	
2005	A Sound of Thunder	Charles Hatton	
2005	Oliver Twist	Fagin	
2005	BloodRayne	Kagan	
2006	Lucky Number Slevin	The Rabbi	
2007	You Kill Me	Frank Falenczyk	
2007	The Last Legion	Ambrosinus	
2007	The Ten Commandments	Narrator	Voice
2008	Elegy	David Kepesh	
2008	War, Inc.	Walken	
2008	The Love Guru	Guru Tugginmypudha	
2008	The Wackness	Dr. Squires	
2008	Transsiberian	Grinko	
2008	China's Stolen Children	Narrator	Voice; Documentary
2008	Fifty Dead Men Walking	Fergus	
2009	Noah's Ark: The New Beginning	Narrator	Voice
2009	Journey to Mecca	Narrator	Voice; Documentary
2010	Shutter Island	Dr. John Cawley	
2010	Teen Patti	Perci Trachtenberg	
2010	Prince of Persia: The Sands of Time	Nizam	
2010	1001 inventions and the library of secrets	The Librarian	Short Educational Film
2011	Hugo	Georges Méliès	
2011	The Desert of Forbidden Art	Narrator	Voice; Documentary
2011	Beatles Stories	Himself	Documentary
2012	The Dictator	Tamir	
2012	A Therapy	Therapist	Short film
2012	It Is No Dream	Narrator	Voice; Documentary
2013	Iron Man 3	Trevor Slattery / The Mandarin	
2013	Ender's Game	Mazer Rackham	
2013	A Common Man	The Man	
2013	Walking with the Enemy	Regent Horthy	
2013	The Physician	Ibn Sina	
2013	A Birder's Guide to Everything	Lawrence Konrad	
2014	Marvel One-Shot: All Hail the King	Trevor Slattery	Short film
2014	War Story	Albert	
2014	The Boxtrolls	Archibald Snatcher	Voice
2014	Learning to Drive	Darwan	
2014	Stonehearst Asylum	Silas Lamb	
2014	Exodus: Gods and Kings	Nun	
2014	Night at the Museum: Secret of the Tomb	Merenkahre	
2014	Robot Overlords	Robin Smythe	
2015	Knight of Cups	The Voice	Voice
2015	Life	Jack L. Warner	
2015	Dragonheart 3: The Sorcerer's Curse	Drago the Dragon	Voice
2015	Unity	Narrator	Voice; Documentary
2015	Self/less	Damian	
2015	The Walk	Papa Rudy	
2016	The Jungle Book	Bagheera	Voice
2016	Collide	Geran	
2017	The Ottoman Lieutenant	Garrett Woodruff	
2017	Security	Charlie	
2017	War Machine	Hamid Karzai	
2017	An Ordinary Man	The General	Also Producer
2018	Backstabbing for Beginners	Pasha	
2018	Operation Finale	Adolf Eichmann	
2018	Night Hunter	Michael Cooper	
2018	Intrigo: Death of an Author	Henderson	
2019	The Red Sea Diving Resort	Ethan Levin	
2019	Spider in the Web	Adereth	
2021	Locked Down	Solomon	
2021	Shang-Chi and the Legend of the Ten Rings	Trevor Slattery	
2022	Dalíland	Salvador Dalí	
2023	Jules	Milton Robinson	
2023	The Wonderful Story of Henry Sugar	Imdad Khan / The Dealer	Short film
2023	Poison	Dr. Ganderbai	Short film
2024	William Tell	King Albert	
2024	The Killer's Game	Zvi Rabinowitz	
2025	The King of Kings	High Priest Caiaphas	Voice
2025	The Thursday Murder Club	Ibrahim Arif	
2025	Desert Warrior	Emperor Kisra	
2026	Deep Water	Rich	
2026	Young Washington	Robert Dinwiddie	
2026	Fortitude †	TBA	Post-production
2027	Sonic the Hedgehog 4 †	TBA	Voice; post-production
TBA	The Way of the Wind †	TBA	Post-production

== Television ==
Year	Title	Role	Notes
1966	Pardon the Expression	Roy	Episode: "The Switched-On Scene"
1966	Orlando	Peter Batterby	6 episodes
1966–1967	Coronation Street	Ron Jenkins	5 episodes
1973	The Adventurer	Pierre	Episode: "The Good Book"
1973	Play for Today	Naseem	Episode: "Hard Labour"
1973	Full House	"A Misfortune" Cast Member	Episode: "13 January 1973"
1973	Wessex Tales	Lord Uplandtowers	Episode: "Barbara of the House of Grebe"
1974	Antony and Cleopatra	Thidias	Television film
1975	The Love School	Rosetti	5 episodes
1976	Dickens of London	Dr. John Elliotson	2 episodes
1976–1979	Crown Court	Jeremy Leigh	5 episodes
1977	Velvet Glove	Chakravarti	Episode: "The Warrior's Return"
1978–1979	BBC2 Playhouse	Ivanov; Robert Cibrario	2 episodes
1982	The Merry Wives of Windsor	Frank Ford	Television film
1983	Kean	Edmund Kean	Television film
1984	Camille	Duval	Television film
1984	Oxbridge Blues	Geoff Craven	Episode: "Sleeps Six"
1985	Silas Marner	Silas Marner	Television film
1986	Stanley's Vision	Stanley Spencer	Television film
1988	The Secret of the Sahara	Sholomon	4 episodes
1988	Lenin: The Train	Lenin	Television film
1989	Murderers Among Us: The Simon Wiesenthal Story	Simon Wiesenthal	Television film
1991	The War That Never Ends	Pericles	Television film
1995	Joseph	Potiphar	Television film
1995	Moses	Moses	Television film
1997	Weapons of Mass Distraction	Julian Messenger	Television film
1998	The Tale of Sweeney Todd	Sweeney Todd	Television film
1998	Crime and Punishment	Porfiry	Television film
1999	Alice in Wonderland	Major Caterpillar	Television film
2001	Anne Frank: The Whole Story	Otto Frank	2 episodes
2005	Mrs. Harris	Herman Tarnower	Television film
2006	The Sopranos	Himself	Episode: "Luxury Lounge"
2014	Garfunkel & Oates	Himself	Episode: "The Fadeaway"
2015	Tut	Ay	3 episodes
2018	All or Nothing: Manchester City	Narrator	Voice; Docuseries
2018	Watership Down	General Woundwort	Voice; 4 episodes
2019	Perpetual Grace, LTD	Pastor Byron Brown	10 episodes
2019	Schindler: The Real Story	Narrator	Voice; Documentary
2026	Wonder Man	Trevor Slattery	7 episodes
2026	The Old Stories: Moses	Moses	3 episodes
2027	The White Lotus	TBA	Upcoming season

== Theatre ==
Year	Title	Role(s)	Playwright	Venue(s)	Ref.
1967	The Taming of the Shrew	Huntsman	William Shakespeare	Royal Shakespeare Theatre	
1967	The Revenger's Tragedy	Lord 3	Cyril Tourneur	Royal Shakespeare Theatre	
1967	As You Like It	Lord 2	William Shakespeare	Royal Shakespeare Theatre	
1967	The Relapse	Wigmaker, unnamed parts	John Vanbrugh	Aldwych Theatre, London	
1968	As You Like It	Amiens	William Shakespeare	Ahmanson Theatre, Los Angeles	
1968	King Lear	Oswald	William Shakespeare	Stratford-Upon-Avon, London	
1968	Troilus and Cressida	Aeneas	William Shakespeare	Royal Shakespeare Theatre	
1968	Much Ado About Nothing	Conrade	William Shakespeare	Royal Shakespeare Theatre	
1969	Troilus and Cressida	Aeneas	William Shakespeare	UK tour	
1969	Bartholomew Fair	Ned Winwife	Ben Jonson	Aldwych Theatre, West End	
1969	The Silver Tassie	The Croucher	Sean O'Casey	Aldwych Theatre, London	
1970	Richard III	Richard Ratcliffe	William Shakespeare	Royal Shakespeare Theatre	
1970	Measure for Measure	Claudio	William Shakespeare	Stratford-Upon-Avon, London	
1970	The Tempest	Ariel	William Shakespeare	Stratford-Upon-Avon, London	
1971	A Midsummer Night's Dream	Demetrius	William Shakespeare	Billy Rose Theatre, Broadway	
1971	Enemies	Sintsov	Maxim Gorky	Aldwych Theatre, London	
1971	Occupations	Gramsci	Trevor Griffiths	UK tour	
1971	Subject To Fits	Ippolit	Robert Montgomery	The Place, London	
1971	The Oz Trial	Richard Neville	devised by David Illingworth and Geoffrey Roberton	The Place, London	
1973	A Lesson in Blood and Roses	Fritz	John Wiles	The Place, London	
1973	Hello and Goodbye	Johnnie Smit	Athol Fugard	The Place, London	
1974	Statements Made After an Arrest Under the Immorality Act	Errol Philander	Athol Fugard	Royal Court Theatre, London	
1975	Man Is Man	Bonze Wang	Bertolt Brecht	The Other Place, Stratford-Upon-Avon	
1975	The Merry Wives of Windsor	Master Slender	William Shakespeare	Royal Shakespeare Theatre	
1975–1976	Hamlet	Hamlet	William Shakespeare	Stratford-Upon-Avon, London	
1979	Cymbeline	Iachimo	William Shakespeare	Royal Shakespeare Theatre	
1979	Julius Caesar	Marcus Brutus	William Shakespeare	Royal Shakespeare Theatre	
1979	Baal	Baal, music composer	Bertolt Brecht	The Other Place, Stratford-Upon-Avon	
1979–1980	The Merry Wives of Windsor	Master Frank Ford	William Shakespeare	Aldwych Theatre, London	
1980	The Life and Adventures of Nicholas Nickleby	Furious Gentleman, Mr Squeers, Mr Wagstaff	Charles Dickens, adapted by David Edgar	Aldwych Theatre, London	
1980	Baal	Baal, music composer	Bertolt Brecht	Gulbenkian Studio, Newcastle-upon-Tyne; Warehouse, London	
1983	Edmund Kean	Edumnd Kean	Raymund Fitzsimons	Haymarket Theatre, West End	
1983	Edmund Kean	Edumnd Kean	Raymund Fitzsimons	Brooks Atkinson Theatre, Broadway	
1984	Melons	Caracol	Bernard Pomerance	The Other Place, Stratford-Upon-Avon	
1985–1986	Othello	Othello	William Shakespeare	Barbican Theatre, London	

== Video games ==
Year	Title	Role	Notes
1995	Kiyeko and the Lost Night	Storyteller	Voice role
1997	Ceremony of Innocence	Victor Frolatti	Voice role
2010	Fable III	Sabine	Voice role Credited as Sir Ben Kingsley
