= List of awards and nominations received by Ben Kingsley =

Sir Ben Kingsley awards and nominations
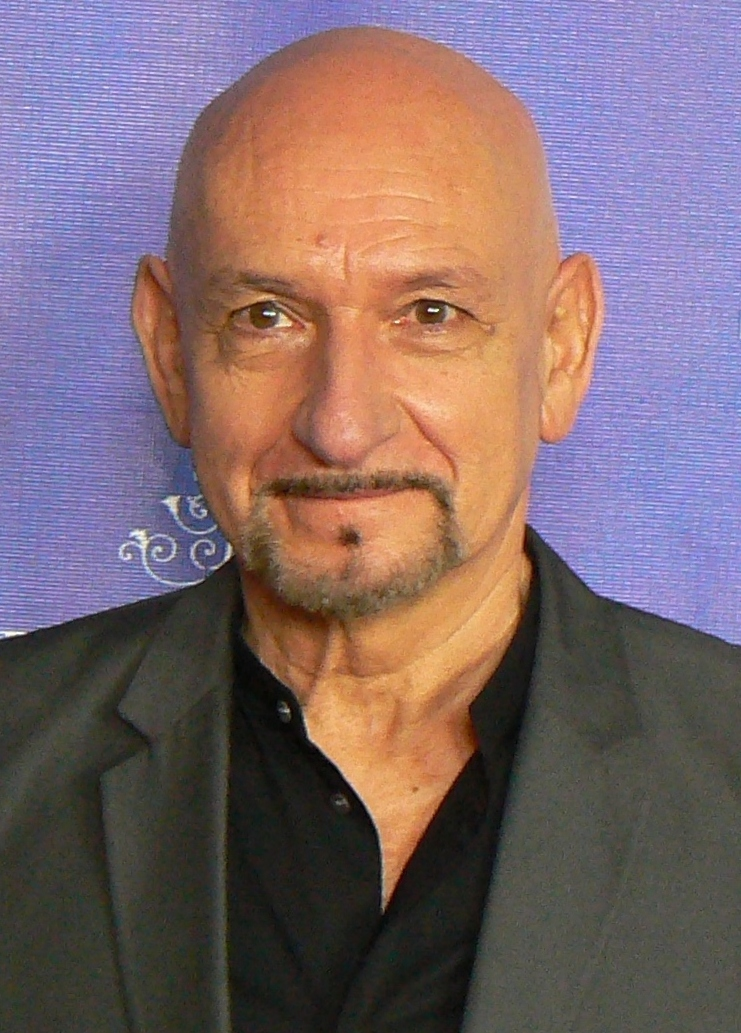
- Kingsley at the Santa Barbara Film Festival in 2012
Awards and nominations
Award	Wins	Nominations
Academy Awards	1	4
Actor Awards	1	5
BAFTA Awards	1	4
Critics' Choice	1	2
Emmy Awards	0	4
Golden Globes	2	8
Grammy Awards	1	2
Olivier Awards	0	2

Totals (Note: Certain award groups do not simply award one winner. They acknowledge several different recipients, have runners-up, and have third place. Since this is a specific recognition and is different from losing an award, runner-up mentions are considered wins in this award tally. For simplification and to avoid errors, each award in this list has been presumed to have had a prior nomination.)
- Wins: 31
- Nominations: 67

This article is a List of awards and nominations received by Sir Ben Kingsley

Ben Kingsley is an English actor who has received and been nominated for numerous accolades through his career, which include an Academy Award, two BAFTA Awards, two Golden Globe Awards, a Grammy Award, and a Screen Actors Guild Award as well as nominations for four Primetime Emmy Awards and two Laurence Olivier Award. In 2002 he was knighted by Queen Elizabeth II for his services to the British film industry. He also received a star on the Hollywood Walk of Fame in 2010 and the Britannia Award in 2013.

Kingsley received the Academy Award for Best Actor for the title role in the biographical epic drama Gandhi (1982). His other Oscar-nominated roles were for Bugsy (1991), Sexy Beast (2000), and House of Sand and Fog (2003). He also won the BAFTA Award for Best Actor in a Leading Role and the Golden Globe Award for Best Actor – Motion Picture Drama for Gandhi (1982). Kingsley received a nomination for the BAFTA Award for Best Actor in a Supporting Role for his role as Itzhak Stern in Steven Spielberg's holocaust drama Schindler's List (1993).

For his television roles he received four Primetime Emmy Award nominations for playing Simon Wiesenthal in the HBO film Murderers Among Us: The Simon Wiesenthal Story (1989), Potiphar in the TNT miniseries Joseph (1995), Otto Frank in the ABC miniseries Anne Frank: The Whole Story (2001), and Herman Tarnower in the HBO film Mrs. Harris (2005). He won the Screen Actors Guild Award for Outstanding Male Actor in a Miniseries or Television Movie for his role as Otto Frank in Anne Frank: The Whole Story and received nominations for playing Sweeney Todd in the television film The Tale of Sweeney Todd (1997), and Ay, the Grand Vizier in the Spike miniseries Tut (2015).

For his work in the theatre, Kingsley received Laurence Olivier Award nominations for the Best Comedy Performance for his role in the revival of William Shakespeare's comedic play The Merry Wives of Windsor (1980) and the Actor of the Year in a New Play for his role as Edmund Kean in the Raymund Fitzsimons one character play Kean (1983) on the West End. Kingsley reprised the role on Broadway.

== Major associations ==
=== Academy Awards ===
Year	Category	Nominated work	Result	Ref.
1983	Best Actor	Gandhi	Won	
1992	Best Supporting Actor	Bugsy	Nominated	
2002	Best Supporting Actor	Sexy Beast	Nominated	
2004	Best Actor	House of Sand and Fog	Nominated	

=== Actor Awards ===
Year	Category	Nominated work	Result	Ref.
1999	Outstanding Actor in a Miniseries or Television Movie	The Tale of Sweeney Todd	Nominated	
2002	Outstanding Actor in a Miniseries or Television Movie	Anne Frank: The Whole Story	Won	
2002	Outstanding Actor in a Supporting Role	Sexy Beast	Nominated	
2004	Outstanding Actor in a Leading Role	House of Sand and Fog	Nominated	
2016	Outstanding Actor in a Miniseries or Television Movie	Tut	Nominated	

=== BAFTA Award ===
Year	Category	Nominated work	Result	Ref.
British Academy Film Awards
1983	Best Actor in a Leading Role	Gandhi	Won	
1983	Most Promising Newcomer	Gandhi	Won	
1994	Best Actor in a Supporting Role	Schindler's List	Nominated	
British Academy Television Awards
1986	Best Actor	Silas Marner	Nominated	

=== Critics' Choice Awards ===
Year	Category	Nominated work	Result	Ref.
Critics' Choice Movie Awards
2002	Best Supporting Actor	Sexy Beast	Won	
2004	Best Actor	House of Sand and Fog	Nominated	

=== Emmy Award ===
Year	Category	Nominated work	Result	Ref.
Primetime Emmy Awards
1989	Outstanding Lead Actor in a Limited Series or Movie	Murderers Among Us: The Simon Wiesenthal Story	Nominated	
1995	Outstanding Supporting Actor in a Limited Series or Movie	Joseph	Nominated	
2001	Outstanding Lead Actor in a Limited Series or Movie	Anne Frank: The Whole Story	Nominated	
2006	Outstanding Lead Actor in a Limited Series or Movie	Mrs. Harris	Nominated	

=== Golden Globe Award ===
Year	Category	Nominated work	Result	Ref.
1983	New Star of the Year – Actor	Gandhi	Won	
1983	Best Actor in a Motion Picture – Drama	Gandhi	Won	
1990	Best Actor – Miniseries or Television Film	Murderers Among Us: The Simon Wiesenthal Story	Nominated	
1992	Best Supporting Actor – Motion Picture	Bugsy	Nominated	
2002	Best Supporting Actor – Motion Picture	Sexy Beast	Nominated	
2002	Best Actor – Miniseries or Television Film	Anne Frank: The Whole Story	Nominated	
2004	Best Actor in a Motion Picture – Drama	House of Sand and Fog	Nominated	
2007	Best Actor – Miniseries or Television Film	Mrs. Harris	Nominated	

=== Grammy Award ===
Year	Category	Nominated work	Result	Ref.
1985	Best Spoken Word Album	The Words Of Gandhi	Won	
1995	Best Spoken Word Album	Schindler's List	Nominated	

=== Laurence Olivier Awards ===
Year	Category	Nominated work	Result	Ref.
1980	Comedy Performance of the Year	The Merry Wives Of Windsor	Nominated	
1983	Actor of the Year in a New Play	Kean	Nominated	

== Miscellaneous associations ==
Awards and nominations received by Ben Kingsley
Award	Year	Nominated work	Category	Result	Ref.
AARP Movies for Grownups Awards	2004	House of Sand and Fog	Best Actor	Runner-up	
AARP Movies for Grownups Awards	2011	Shutter Island	Best Supporting Actor	Runner-up	
AARP Movies for Grownups Awards	2012	Hugo	Best Supporting Actor	Runner-up	
Alliance of Women Film Journalists	2007	You Kill Me	Most Egregious Age Difference Between Leading Man and Love Interest (Note: Shared with Téa Leoni.)	Nominated	
Alliance of Women Film Journalists	2008	The Wackness	Most Egregious Age Difference Between Leading Man and Love Interest (Note: Shared with Mary-Kate Olsen .)	Won	
American Film Institute Awards	2001	Anne Frank: The Whole Story	Actor of the Year – Male – TV Movie or Mini-Series	Nominated	
Annie Awards	2015	The Boxtrolls	Outstanding Voice Acting in a Feature Production	Won	
Britannia Awards	2013	—	Albert R. Broccoli Britannia Award for Worldwide Contribution to Entertainment	Won	
British Independent Film Awards	2001	Sexy Beast	Best Actor	Won	
Boston Society of Film Critics	2001	Sexy Beast	Best Supporting Actor	Won	
Capri Hollywood International Film Festival	2011	—	Capri Legend Award	Won	
Chicago Film Critics Association	2002	Sexy Beast	Best Supporting Actor	Nominated	
Chicago Film Critics Association	2004	House of Sand and Fog	Best Actor	Nominated	
Dallas-Fort Worth Film Critics Association Awards	2002	Sexy Beast	Best Supporting Actor	Won	
Dallas-Fort Worth Film Critics Association Awards	2004	House of Sand and Fog	Best Actor	Nominated	
European Film Awards	2001	Sexy Beast	Best Actor	Won	
Evening Standard British Film Awards	1983	Gandhi; Betrayal	Best Actor	Won	
Evening Standard British Film Awards	1994	Schindler's List	Best Actor	Won	
Goldene Kamera	1990	Murderers Among Us: The Simon Wiesenthal Story	Golden Camera Award	Won	
Golden Raspberry Awards	2007	BloodRayne	Worst Supporting Actor	Nominated	
Golden Raspberry Awards	2009	The Love Guru; War, Inc. The Wackness	Worst Supporting Actor	Nominated	
Independent Spirit Awards	2004	House of Sand and Fog	Best Male Lead	Nominated	
Karlovy Vary International Film Festival	2001	—	Crystal Globe for Outstanding Artistic Contribution to World Cinema	Won	
National Board of Review	1982	—	Best Actor	Won	
National Film Awards UK	2016	—	Global Contribution to Motion Picture	Nominated	
National Society of Film Critics Awards	1982	The Words Of Gandhi	Best Actor	2nd place	
National Society of Film Critics Awards	2002	Sexy Beast	Best Supporting Actor	2nd place	
Satellite Awards	2002	Sexy Beast	Best Actor—Motion Picture Drama	Won	
Satellite Awards	2002	Anne Frank: The Whole Story	Best Actor—Miniseries or Television Film	Nominated	
Satellite Awards	2006	Mrs. Harris	Best Actor—Miniseries or Television Film	Nominated	
Satellite Awards	2007	You Kill Me	Best Actor—Motion Picture Comedy or Musical	Nominated	
Saturn Awards	2014	Iron Man 3	Best Supporting Actor	Won	
Seville European Film Festival	2009	—	Honorary Award	Won	
Teen Choice Awards	2013	Iron Man 3	Choice Movie Villain	Nominated	
Toronto Film Critics Association Awards	2001	Sexy Beast	Best Supporting Actor	Won	
Washington D.C. Area Film Critics Association	2003	House of Sand and Fog	Best Actor	Nominated	
