= David Jones (director) =

English stage, television, and film director

- Born: David Hugh Jones; 19 February 1934; Poole, Dorset, England, United Kingdom
- Died: 19 September 2008 (aged 74); Rockport, Maine, United States
- Education: Christ's College, Cambridge; Yale School of Drama
- Occupations: Film director, television director, theatre director
- Spouse(s): Sheila Allen; Joyce Tenneson
- Children: Jesse and Joe

David Hugh Jones (19 February 1934 – 19 September 2008) was an English stage, television and film director.

== Life and career ==
Jones was born in Poole, Dorset, the son of John David Jones and his wife Gwendolen Agnes Langworthy (Ricketts), and was educated at Taunton School and Christ's College, Cambridge. Originally a television director, he first worked for BBC producer Huw Wheldon working on the Monitor arts television series from 1958 to 1964. His first London stage production was a triple-bill of T. S. Eliot's Sweeney Agonistes, W. B. Yeats's Purgatory and Samuel Beckett's Krapp's Last Tape at the Mermaid Theatre in 1961.

He directed his first production for the Royal Shakespeare Company at the Arts Theatre in 1962, Boris Vian's The Empire Builder, and two years later accepted the administrative post Artistic Controller at the Royal Shakespeare Company (RSC), helping to plan programmes of new plays and European classics at the Aldwych Theatre in London. He also took over responsibility for running the Aldwych from 1969 to 1972, and again in 1975–77. During this period he championed the plays of David Mercer and Maxim Gorky.

For BBC television he directed Ice Age, The Beaux Stratagem and Langrishe, Go Down (1978). He also produced Play of the Month (1977–79).

He left the Royal Shakespeare Company in 1979, taking up an appointment as an artistic director at the Brooklyn Academy of Music and to found a resident theatre company modelled on the RSC (Beauman 344).

After teaching at the Yale School of Drama in 1981, he returned to England, where for the BBC Television Shakespeare series he directed The Merry Wives of Windsor (1982), and Pericles, Prince of Tyre (1984), and made his debut as a feature film director with Betrayal (1983), based on Harold Pinter's screenplay adaptation of his 1978 play Betrayal.

From 1973 to 1978, Jones was Artistic Director of the Royal Shakespeare Company (RSC), at the Aldwych Theatre, where he directed plays by William Shakespeare, Bertolt Brecht, Anton Chekhov, Seán O'Casey, Maxim Gorky, Harley Granville-Barker, Graham Greene, and others, and became an honorary associate director of the RSC in 1991. From 1979 to 1981, he was Artistic Director of the BAM Theater Company (1979–1981).

He also directed three productions at the Williamstown Theatre Festival, in Williamstown, Massachusetts: On the Razzle (1981), by Tom Stoppard (2005); Sweet Bird of Youth (1959), by Tennessee Williams (2006), and The Autumn Garden (1951), by Lillian Hellman (2007).

== Private life ==
Jones married the British actress Sheila Allen in 1964 with whom he had two sons, Jesse (of Brooklyn, New York) and Joseph (of Tucson, Arizona). After his divorce from Allen, Jones's partner of the last 20 years of his life was photographer Joyce Tenneson; the couple lived in New York at the time of his death.

== Theatre ==
- The Empire Builders (Boris Vian) RSC Arts Theatre, 1962
- The Governor's Lady (David Mercer) Aldwych, 1965
- Saint's Day, Stratford East, 1965
- The Investigation (Peter Weiss) co-directed with Peter Brook, Aldwych, 1965
- Belcher's Luck (David Mercer) Aldwych, 1966;
- As You Like It, Stratford, 1967; Aldwych, 1967; Los Angeles, 1968; Stratford, 1968
- Diary of a Scoundrel (Alexander Ostrovsky), Liverpool, 1968
- The Tempest, Chichester, 1968
- The Silver Tassie (Sean O'Casey) Aldwych, 1969
- After Haggerty (David Mercer) Aldwych and Criterion Theatre, 1970
- The Plebeians Rehearse the Uprising (Günter Grass) Aldwych, 1970
- Enemies (Maxim Gorky) Aldwych, 1971
- The Lower Depths (Maxim Gorky) Aldwych, 1972
- The Island of the Mighty (John Arden) Aldwych, 1972
- Love's Labour's Lost Stratford, 1973; New York and Aldwych 1975
- Duck Song (David Mercer) Aldwych, 1974
- Summerfolk (Maxim Gorky) Aldwych, 1974; New York, 1975
- The Marrying of Anne Leete (Harley Granville-Barker) Aldwych, 1975
- The Return of A. J. Raffles (Graham Greene) Aldwych, 1975; Stratford 1976
- Twelfth Night, Stratford, Ontario, 1975
- The Zykovs (Maxim Gorky) Aldwych, 1976
- Ivanov (Anton Chekhov) Aldwych, 1976
- All's Well That Ends Well, Stratford, Ontario, 1977
- Cymbeline Stratford 1979
- Baal (Bertolt Brecht) The Other Place, Stratford 1979; Donmar Warehouse, 1980
- The Winter's Tale, BAM Theatre Company, 1980
- Jungle of Cities (Bertolt Brecht) BAM Theatre Company, 1981.Theater
- The Custom of the Country (Nicholas Wright) RSC Barbican The Pit, 1983
- Old Times (Harold Pinter), starring Liv Ullmann, Yvonne Arnaud Theatre and Theatre Royal Haymarket, 1985
- Principia Scriptoriae (Richard Nelson) The Pit, 1986
- Barbarians (Maxim Gorky) Aldwych, 1990
- Misha's Party (Richard Nelson and Alexander Gelman) The Pit, 1993
- No Man's Land (Harold Pinter) New York, 1994
- The Hothouse (Harold Pinter) Minerva Theatre, Chichester and Comedy Theatre, 1995
- Taking Sides (Ronald Harwood) New York, 1996. Taking Sides, a CurtainUp review
- The Caretaker (Harold Pinter) New York, 2003.The Caretaker, a CurtainUp review
- Triptych (Edna O'Brien) Irish Repertory Theatre, New York, 2004.Triptych, a CurtainUp review
- On the Razzle (Tom Stoppard), Williamstown Theatre Festival, 2005.Williamstown Theatre Festival
- Sweet Bird of Youth (Tennessee Williams), Williamstown Theatre Festival, 2006.Sweet Bird of Youth, a CurtainUp Berkshire Review
- The Last Confession (Roger Crane) Minerva Theatre, Chichester, May 2007, Theatre Royal Haymarket, July 2007.Theatre review: The Last Confession at Theatre Royal Haymarket
- The Autumn Garden (Lillian Hellman), Williamstown Theatre Festival, August 2007.Williamstown Theatre Festival--Summer 2007

== Films ==
- Langrishe, Go Down (1970; adapt. for TV 1978; film release 2002)
- Betrayal (1983)
- 84 Charing Cross Road (1987)
- Jacknife (1989)
- The Trial (1993)
- Time to Say Goodbye? (1997)
- The Confession (starring Ben Kingsley) (1999)

== Television ==
Produced and presented the BBC arts magazine Monitor (1958–1964) and Review (1971–1972). Also produced Kean (Jean-Paul Sartre, 1954) for BBC television (starring Anthony Hopkins and directed by James Cellan Jones) (1978).

Directed the following productions:

- Langrishe, Go Down (starring Judi Dench and Jeremy Irons) (1978)
- Look Back in Anger (co-directed with Lindsay Anderson and starring Malcolm McDowell) (1980)
- The Merry Wives of Windsor (starring Richard Griffiths as Falstaff) (1982)
- Pericles, Prince of Tyre (1984)
- The Devil's Disciple (1987)
- The Christmas Wife (starring Jason Robards and Julie Harris) (1988)
- Fire in the Dark (starring Olympia Dukakis) (1991)
- And Then There Was One (1994)
- Is There Life Out There? (1994)
- A Christmas Carol (1999)

Also various episodes of:

- Picket Fences (1992)
- Chicago Hope (1994)
- The Practice (The Civil Right) (1997)
- Law & Order: SVU (1999)
- 7th Heaven (2003)
- Bones (The Man on Death Row) (2005)
