= Red button =

Red button may refer to:

- Red Button (digital television), a button on the remote control for certain digital television set top boxes in the United Kingdom and Australia, and used to access interactive television services
  - BBC Red Button, a digital interactive television service in the United Kingdom
- Red Buttons (1919–2006), the stage name of American comedian and actor Aaron Chwatt
- The Red Button, an American pop band consisting of Seth Swirsky and Mike Ruekberg
- Red Button, an enemy of Doga, a superhero character appearing in Raj Comics, India

== See also ==
- Kill switch, also called big red button or big red switch, an emergency shut-off mechanism for machinery, also used symbolically in works of fiction as a means to activate a destructive device
