= Kiyeko and the Lost Night =

- Developer: Ubi Soft
- Publisher: Ubi Soft
- Platforms: Windows; Macintosh
- Release: 1995
- Genre: Educational

Kiyeko and the Lost Night, also known as Kiyeko and the Lost Night: A Magical Adventure in the Amazon Rain Forest, is a 1995 educational video game developed and published by Ubi Soft. It is narrated by Ben Kingsley.

== Gameplay ==
Kiyeko and the Lost Night presents an interactive, narrated story in which the player follows Kiyeko as he discovers that snakes have stolen the night, returns to warn his father and the Shaman, and watches as the Shaman crafts a rattle that the chief trades to the snakes for only a few minutes of darkness before they demand the natives' arrow poison as the true price. The game features the narration of Ben Kingsley, animated Amazon plants and animals that react to clicks, character speech accompanying the text, leaf‑shaped navigation arrows, pauses between narrated sections for exploration, and multilingual support allowing the story to be read and heard in English and several other languages.

== Reception ==
Reception

Review scores
Publication	Score
All Game Guide	4/5
Cambridge Evening News	70%
Daily Mirror	86%
The Toronto Star	3/5

All Game Guide called the animations in Kiyeko and the Lost Night beautiful and amusing. CNET recommended the program to kids.

Kiyeko and the Lost Night was named one of the top 100 CD-ROMs by PC Magazine.
