= Langrishe, Go Down =

1966 book by Aidan Higgins and 1978 teleplay

Langrishe, Go Down, the novel by Aidan Higgins (1966), was adapted for the screen by Harold Pinter, directed by David Jones, filmed for BBC Television in association with Raidió Teilifís Éireann, and first broadcast in September 1978 as a 90-minute BBC2's Play of the Week. On 17 July, 2002, Langrishe, Go Down was re-released as a theatrical 16mm feature film, after being shown in The Spaces Between the Words: A Tribute to Harold Pinter, by the Film Society of Lincoln Center, as part of the Harold Pinter Festival of the Lincoln Center Festival 2001, held at Lincoln Center for the Performing Arts, in New York City, from 21 to 31 July 2001.

== Credits ==
- Screenplay: Harold Pinter, from the novel by Aidan Higgins
- Director: David Jones
- Original score: Carl Davis
- Photography: Elmer Cossey
- Designer: Roger Murray-Leach
- Sound Recordist: Graham Hare

=== Cast ===
- Imogen Langrishe: Judi Dench
- Otto Beck: Jeremy Irons
- Helen Langrishe: Annette Crosbie
- Lily Langrishe: Susan Williamson
- Maureen Layde: Margaret Whiting
- Barry Shannon: Harold Pinter

== Setting ==
The setting is a fading Irish mansion in the Kilkenny countryside, in the late 1930s, and also includes some locations in Dublin.

== Plot synopsis ==
Three spinster sisters, Imogene (Dench), Helen (Crosbie), and Lily Langrishe (Williamson), lose their equanimity — and in the case of Imogene her virginity — when a mature German student (Jeremy Irons) rents lodging from them while he works on his thesis.

== Home media ==
The film was released on DVD in Australia by MRA Entertainment.
