= Roger Murray-Leach =

British television and film production designer

- Born: 25 June 1943 (age 82)
- Occupations: Film & Television production designer

Roger Murray-Leach (born 25 June 1943) is a British production designer who worked at the BBC on the science fiction television series Doctor Who and Blake's 7 in the 1970s, and later worked on major feature films.

== Career ==
=== Doctor Who ===
Initially training to be an architect, Murray-Leach joined the BBC design department in 1966. He began working on Doctor Who when Philip Hinchcliffe took over as producer in late 1974. Hinchcliffe's vision for the series included giving a high priority to set design. Murray-Leach designed several serials under Hinchcliffe's reign.

Murray-Leach has appeared in a number of television and DVD documentaries discussing his work on Doctor Who, including A Darker Side, a retrospective feature included on the BBC DVD release of Planet of Evil, in which he and Hinchcliffe returned to Ealing studios to discuss the story's design and production.

=== Blake's 7 ===
David Maloney, a director who had worked on Doctor Who serials designed by Murray-Leach, went on to produce Blake's 7 for the BBC and immediately secured his services as lead designer, which included both the exterior and interior of the Liberator spacecraft.

In 1980, following his work on Langrishe, Go Down, starring Judi Dench and Jeremy Irons, and Speed King, starring Robert Hardy as Sir Malcolm Campbell, Murray-Leach left the BBC to work on the 1981 series Winston Churchill: The Wilderness Years, for which he was nominated for a BAFTA award.

=== Film production ===
Murray-Leach then moved into feature films, working as production designer on Local Hero. In 1983 he was also employed as art director on The Killing Fields. Following this his credits include A Christmas Carol, with George C Scott as Ebenezer Scrooge, Defence of the Realm, Clockwise, A Fish Called Wanda, and the 1989 biographical film of Ian Fleming, Goldeneye. His movie career extended into the 1990s with, among others, Mrs. 'Arris Goes to Paris, The Mighty Quinn, Twenty-One and Fierce Creatures.

In 2002 he co-founded the 'Fishworks' restaurant chain with chef Mitch Tonks.

In recent years he has worked with film director Norman Stone on productions such as Beyond Narnia, Florence Nightingale, KJV, Whistler and The Most Reluctant Convert - as well as working on the development of further projects.
