= Seth Swirsky =

American singer-songwriter (born 1960)

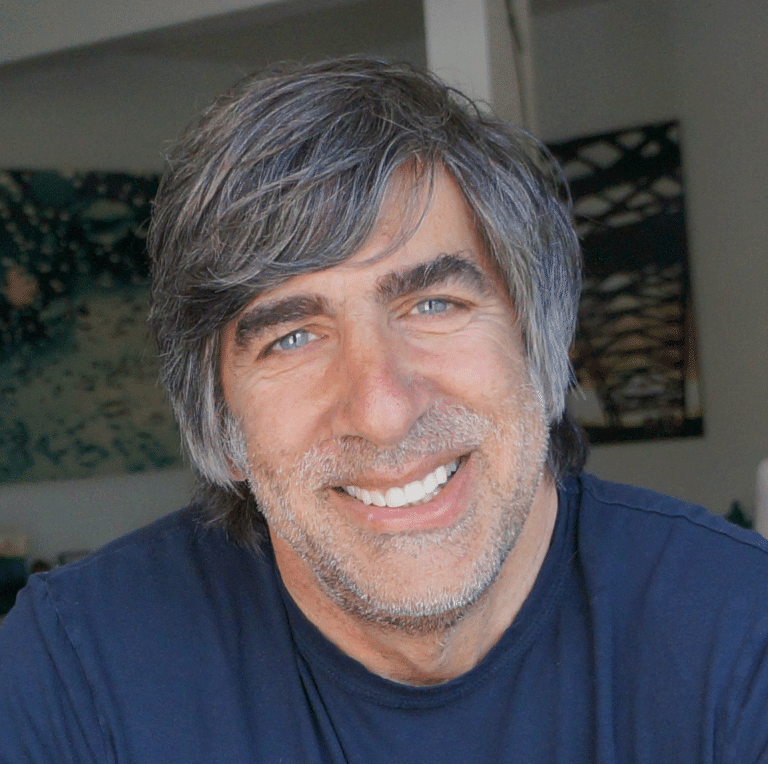

Background information
- Born: August 5, 1960 (age 65)
- Genres: Pop music
- Occupations: Songwriter, author, recording artist (Jem Records), baseball memorabilia collector, filmmaker
- Instruments: Guitar, piano, drums, singer
- Years active: 1980–present

Seth A. Swirsky (born August 5, 1960) is an American pop music songwriter (including the Grammy-nominated "Tell It to My Heart"), an author, a recording artist, a filmmaker, a political writer and a noted baseball memorabilia collector.

== Songwriter ==

After graduating from Dartmouth College in 1982, Swirsky wrote the Grammy-nominated hit "Tell It to My Heart" with Ernie Gold for Taylor Dayne. The song was on the Billboard Pop Singles Chart for six months in 1988, reaching No. 7.

The song was also a No. 1 hit in Germany, The Netherlands and Sweden and No. 3 in the UK. In 2002, Kelly Llorenna’s version of the song went to No. 9 on the British charts. The song won Swirsky an ASCAP songwriter's award for being one of the most performed songs of the year. In 2006, the song was recorded by the Royal Gigolos and spent two weeks on the Swiss charts at No. 2. The song was used in the national ad campaign for Cheetos in 2016.

Swirsky wrote Dayne's follow-up top ten hit, "Prove Your Love," with Arnie Roman. That song was a No. 7 Billboard pop hit as well as a No. 1 Billboard dance hit. It reached No. 1 in Switzerland, No. 4 in Germany and No. 8 in the UK.

Swirsky wrote "Love is a Beautiful Thing," which was recorded by Al Green for his 1995 album Your Heart's in Good Hands. Green's version was also used as Revlon's theme song in their international ad campaign in 2004.

Swirsky composed "Instant Pleasure" for Rufus Wainwright, which was featured in Adam Sandler's Big Daddy (1999). He wrote "Did You Give Enough Love" with Arnie Roman for Celine Dion (a top 20 song in Canada), "Tear it Up" with Gardner Cole for Michael McDonald (a Billboard top 30 Adult Contemporary US hit and top 40 British charting single), "After All" for Air Supply, "Not Gonna Be the One" for Olivia Newton-John's Greatest Hits album, Back to Basics: The Essential Collection 1971–1992 and "Christmas Lullaby" for Faith Evans. Others he has written songs for include Jane Weidlin of The Go-Go's, Peter Allen, Brenda K. Starr, Trey Lorenz, Melissa Manchester, Rita Coolidge, Exposé and Wild Orchid.

During his career he has collaborated with Eric Carmen of Raspberries, David Pack of Ambrosia, Marshall Crenshaw, Felix Cavaliere of The Rascals, Cy Curnin of The Fixx, Jim Ellison of Material Issue, Gerry Goffin, Chynna Phillips and Steve Kipner.

Swirsky was featured as the "Writer of the Week" in the 2011 Nov./Dec.issue of American Songwriter magazine. That same year, he sang the National Anthem before a Cubs baseball game at Wrigley Field.

=== Mariah Carey plagiarism lawsuit ===
In 2000, Swirsky and co-writer Warryn Campbell filed a copyright infringement lawsuit claiming that the Mariah Carey song "Thank God I Found You" plagiarized "One of Those Love Songs", a song which Swirsky and Campbell wrote for Xscape's 1998 Traces of My Lipstick album.

In the precedent-setting Swirsky v. Carey decision, which clarified the standard for proving copyright infringement, the United States Court of Appeals for the Ninth Circuit overturned the initial 2002 dismissal of the case. The case was settled out of court in April 2006.

== Recordings ==
Swirsky was named in Music Connection magazine's December 2010 issue as one of the Hot 100 unsigned artists of the year.

=== Instant Pleasure ===
In 2005, Swirsky's first solo album, Instant Pleasure, was released. Guest appearances on the 11-song album, produced by Jewel drummer Dorian Crozier, include Andy Sturmer of Jellyfish, The Rembrandts, Michael Chavez of John Mayer's band and Justin Meldal-Johnsen of Beck.

=== Watercolor Day ===
Swirsky's second solo album, Watercolor Day, was released on May 18, 2010. The title song, "Watercolor Day', won Best Pop Song of the year at the Hollywood Music in Media Awards (HMMA) on November 18, 2010. Goldmine Magazine said "Seth Swirsky's Watercolor Day is the first great power pop record of 2010" and named it the No. 4 Best Pop record in their 2010 year-end poll. The Loft said it that was the station's "Album of the Summer". In Tim Cain's 2010 Top 20-year-end "Best Of" list in the Illinois Herald Review, he included Watercolor Day at No. 14.

=== Circles and Squares ===
Swirsky's 3rd solo record, the 16-song Circles and Squares, was released by Grimble Records on August 19, 2016. The Wall Street Journal’s Marc Myers wrote "On his new album, Circles and Squares, Seth has captured the spirit and textured sound of the Fab Four in their late period." Goldmine Magazine called Circles and Squares a "tour-de-force that's not to be missed", comparing it to Paul McCartney's 1970's solo debut, McCartney. The songs "Shine" and "Circles and Squares" were "DJ PICKS" on the Los Angeles radio station KCRW. Swirsky played all of the instruments on the album, except for two small parts. The fourth song from the album, "Far Away", was among the nominees for Song of the Year in the September listing of the 2016 HMMA.

It was listed as No. 7 by Goldmine Magazine in its albums of the year.

=== Songs From the Green Couch ===
Lolipop Records released Swirsky's 4th solo album of 15 pop songs, Songs from the Green Couch, in 2022.

=== Christmas Eve ===
Grimble Records released Swirsky's single Christmas Eve on December 1, 2022.

=== The Red Button ===
Swirsky's album of pop songs, She's About to Cross My Mind, recorded with Mike Ruekberg under the group name The Red Button, was released in February 2007.

A second album by The Red Button, entitled As Far As Yesterday Goes, was released on June 21, 2011. The song "Picture" from this album was nominated for Best Pop Song at the 2011 HMMA.

The Red Button was named to Music Connection Magazine's 2011 Hot 100 Unsigned Artist list.

The Red Button was signed by Jem Records in March 2017 and released its third album called Now It's All This!, on October 20, 2017.

==== The Red Button featuring Peter Noone ====
In 2018, Peter Noone recorded one of Swirsky's songs, "Ooh Girl", that originally was recorded by The Red Button. The single release was billed as The Red Button, featuring Peter Noone.

=== The Best of Seth Swirsky ===
Sony Records in Japan released a compilation from his four solo albums on December 8, 2021.

== Baseball collection ==
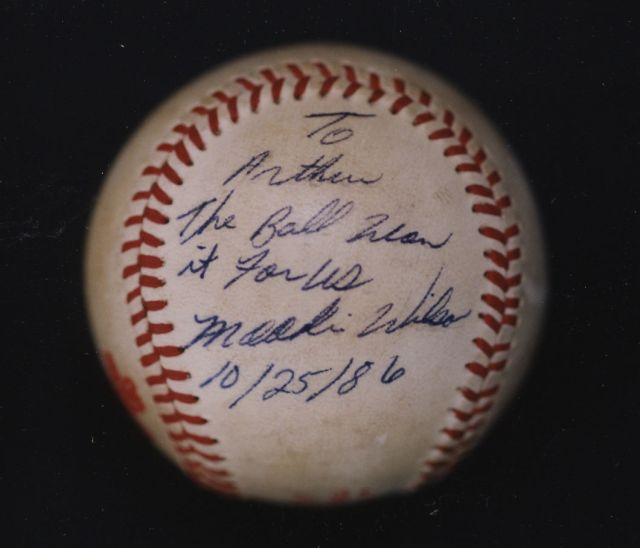

Swirsky's baseball collection included the ball that went between Bill Buckner's legs in the 1986 World Series (it was originally owned by Charlie Sheen; Swirsky got it in April 2000); the only known bottle of 1986 sparkling wine from the Red Sox celebration that would never be; Reggie Jackson's third home run ball from the 1977 World Series; a ball signed by The Beatles the night they played their famous Shea Stadium concert in 1965; Tom Seaver's 1969 World Series jersey; the only known surviving ball from the second game of Johnny Vander Meer's two consecutive no-hitters, and the letter written by baseball commissioner Kenesaw Mountain Landis banning Shoeless Joe Jackson from playing Major League Baseball, among other historic items. The Buckner ball went up for auction on October 15, 2011, for $1 million. It failed to sell.

The "Buckner Ball" that brought Ray Knight home with the winning run in Game 6 of the 1986 World Series was on display at the Mets Hall of Fame & Museum at Citi Field during the 2010 baseball season. Many pieces in the collection were featured in baseball retrospectives at the Queens Museum of Art and The Bronx Museum of the Arts in 2004.

Swirsky sold his 250 piece collection on May 3, 2012, through Heritage Auctions for close to $1.5 million. The ball that went through Buckner's legs sold for $418,250 to a buyer who initially was anonymous but was later revealed to be Steve Cohen, who purchased the New York Mets in 2020.

== Books and publications ==
=== Books ===
He wrote three best-selling books collecting letters between himself and Major League Baseball players and other fans and a book about self-managing anxiety.

- Swirsky, Seth, ed. (1996). Baseball letters : a fan's correspondence with his heroes. New York: Kodansha International. ISBN 978-1568361529.
- Swirsky, Seth, ed. (1999). Every pitcher tells a story : letters gathered by a devoted baseball fan (1st ed.). New York: Times Books. ISBN 978-0812930559.
- Swirsky, Seth, ed. (2003). Something to write home about : great baseball memories in letters to a fan (1st ed.). New York: Crown Publishers. ISBN 978-0609608944.
- Swirsky, Seth (2017). 21 Ways to a Happier Depression: A Creative Guide to Getting Unstuck from Anxiety, Setbacks, and Stress. Sourcebooks. ISBN 9781492648130.
- Swirsky, Seth (2021). Shh…Your Toes Are Sleeping. Wonderwall Books. ISBN 9781098369026.
- Chris, Epting; Foreword by Swirsky, Seth (2010). Hello, it's me : dispatches from a pop culture junkie. Santa Monica: Santa Monica Press. ISBN 978-1595800534.

=== Publications ===
Swirsky is a political and cultural writer, having written for The National Review and Real Clear Politics.

== Film ==
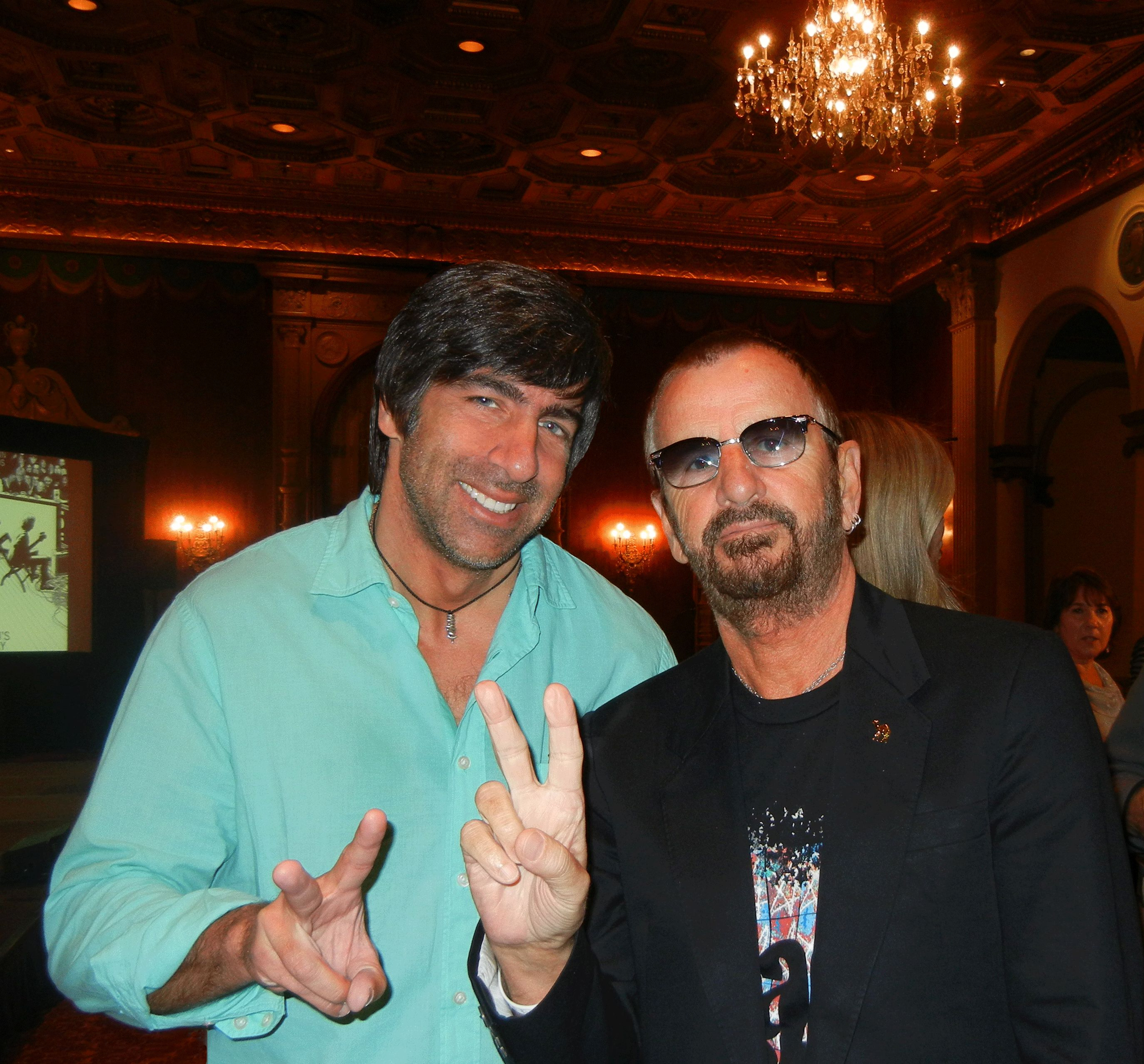
Swirsky (l.) with Ringo Starr in February 2011

=== Beatles Stories ===
Swirsky's full-length documentary, Beatles Stories, consists of filmed interviews that Swirsky conducted with people who had a personal story or recollection about themselves and one or all of The Beatles.

It was chosen as an Official Selection at the 2011 ÉCU The European Independent Film Festival and had its world premiere in Paris, France, on April 3, 2011.

=== The Last Giant ===
Swirsky's short film The Last Giant (which consisted of on-camera reminiscences of 1930s major league baseball All-Star Harry "The Horse" Danning) was a 2007 Official Selection in both the (Washington) D.C. International Film Festival (DCIFF) and the National Baseball Hall of Fame and Museum's 2nd Annual Film Festival.
