= Aidan Higgins =

Irish writer (1927–2015)

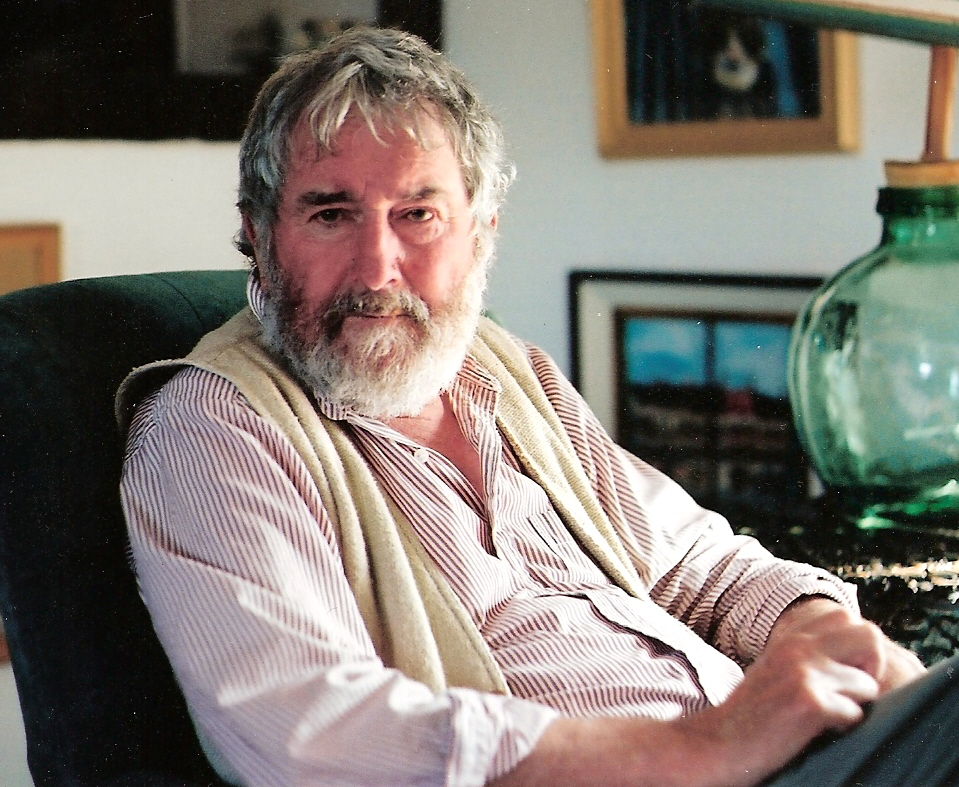
- Higgins at home in Kinsale, 2007
- Born: 3 March 1927; Celbridge, County Kildare, Ireland
- Died: 27 December 2015 (aged 88); Kinsale, County Cork, Ireland
- Occupation: Writer
- Spouse: Alannah Hopkin
- Writing career
- Genre: Fiction
- Notable awards: James Tait Black Memorial Prize
- Movement: Modernism

Aidan Higgins (3 March 1927 – 27 December 2015) was an Irish writer. He wrote short stories, travel pieces, radio dramas and novels. Among his published works are Langrishe, Go Down (1966), Balcony of Europe (1972) and the biographical Dog Days (1998). His writing is characterised by distinctively non-conventional foreign settings and a stream of consciousness narrative mode. Most of his early fiction is autobiographical – "like slug trails, all the fiction happened."

== Life ==
Aidan Higgins was born in Celbridge, County Kildare, Ireland. He attended local schools and Clongowes Wood College, a private boarding school. In the early 1950s he worked in Dublin as a copywriter for the Domas Advertising Agency. He then moved to London and worked in the light industry for about two years. He married Jill Damaris Anders in London on 25 November 1955. From 1960, Higgins sojourned in Southern Spain, South Africa, Berlin and Rhodesia. In 1960 and 1961 he worked as a scriptwriter for Filmlets, an advertising firm in Johannesburg. These journeys provided material for much of his later work, including his three autobiographies, Donkey's Years (1996), Dog Days (1998) and The Whole Hog (2000).

Higgins lived in Kinsale, County Cork, from 1986 with the writer and journalist Alannah Hopkin. They were married in Dublin in November 1997. He was a founder member of Irish artists' association Aosdána.

Higgins died aged 88 on 27 December 2015 in Kinsale.

== Works ==
His upbringing in a landed Catholic family provided material for his first novel, Langrishe, Go Down (1966). The novel is set in the 1930s in a run-down "big house" in County Kildare, inhabited by the last members of the Langrishe family, three spinster sisters, Catholics, living in not-so-genteel poverty in a once-grand setting. One sister, Imogen, has an affair with a German intellectual, Otto Beck, which transgresses the moral code of the time, bringing her a brief experience of happiness. Otto's intellectual pursuits contrast with the moribund cultural life of mid-20th-century Ireland. The book was awarded the James Tait Black Memorial Prize for fiction and was later adapted as a BBC television film by British playwright Harold Pinter, in association with RTÉ. Langrishe also received the Irish Academy of Letters Award.

His second major novel, Balcony of Europe, takes its name from a feature of the Spanish fishing village, Nerja Andalusia, where it is set. The novel is carefully crafted, and rich in embedded literary references, using Spanish and Irish settings and various languages, including Spanish and some German, in its account of the daily life in the beaches and bars of Nerja of a largely expatriate community. The protagonist, an artist called Dan Ruttle, is obsessed with his friend's young American wife, Charlotte, and by the contrast between his life in a cosmopolitan artistic community in the Mediterranean, and his Irish origins. The book was re-edited in collaboration with Neil Murphy and published by Dalkey Archive Press in 2010, with the Irish material cut, and the affair between Dan Ruttle and Charlotte, foregrounded.

Later novels include the widely acclaimed Bornholm Night Ferry and Lions of the Grunwald. Various writings have been collected and reprinted by the Dalkey Archive Press, including his three-volume autobiography, A Bestiary, and a collection of fiction, Flotsam and Jetsam, both of which demonstrate his wide erudition and his experience of life and travel in South Africa, Germany and London, which gives his writing a largely cosmopolitan feel, utilising a range of European languages in turns of phrase.

== Awards ==
- Felo de Se – Somin Trust Award, 1963
- Langrishe, Go Down – James Tait Black Memorial Prize, 1967
- DAAD scholarship of Berlin, 1969
- American Irish Foundation grant, 1977
- D.D.L., National University of Ireland, 2001

== Bibliography ==
- A Bestiary. Illinois: Dalkey Archive Press, 2004.
- As I Was Riding Down Duval Boulevard with Pete La Salle. Dublin: Anam Press, 2003.
- Balcony of Europe. London: Calder & Boyars, 1972; New York: Delacorte, 1972; Illinois, Dalkey Archive Press, 2010.
- Bornholm Night-Ferry. London: Allison & Busby; Ireland: Brandon Books, 1983; London: Abacus, 1985; Illinois: Dalkey Archive Press, 2006.
- Darkling Plains: Texts for the Air. Illinois: Dalkey Archive Press, 2010.
- Dog Days: A Sequel to Donkey’s Years. London: Secker & Warburg, 1998.
- Donkey’s Years: Memories of a Life as Story Told. London: Secker & Warburg, 1995.
- Felo de Se. London: Calder & Boyars, 1960; as Killachter Meadow, New York: Grove Press, 1960; as *Asylum and Other Stories, London: Calder & Boyars, 1978; New York: Riverrun Press, 1979.
- Flotsam & Jetsam. London: Minerva, 1997; Illinois: Dalkey Archive Press, 2002.
- Helsingor Station & Other Departures: Fictions and Autobiographies 1956–1989. London: Secker & Warburg, 1989.
- Images of Africa: Diary (1956–60). London: Calder & Boyars, 1971.
- Langrishe, Go Down. London: Calder & Boyars, 1966; New York: Grove Press, 1966; London: Paladin, 1987; Illinois: Dalkey Archive Press, 2004; Dublin: New Island, 2007.
- Lions of the Grunewald. London: Secker & Warburg, 1993. Also as Weaver's Women. London: Secker & Warburg, 1993.
- March Hares. Dalkey Archive Press, 2017.
- Ronda Gorge & Other Precipices: Travel Writings 1959–1989. London: Secker & Warburg, 1989.
- Scenes from a Receding Past. London: Calder, 1977; Dallas: Riverrun Press, 1977; Illinois: Dalkey Archive Press, 2005.
- The Whole Hog: A Sequel to Donkey’s Years and Dog Days. London: Secker & Warburg, 2000.
- Windy Arbours. Illinois: Dalkey Archive Press, 2005.

== Selected criticism ==
Book

- Neil Murphy (ed.) Aidan Higgins: The Fragility of Form (Essays and Commentary). Dalkey Archive Press, 2010.

Essays and Reviews

- Beja, Morris. "Felons of Our Selves: The Fiction of Aidan Higgins". Irish University Review 3, 2 (Autumn 1973): 163–78.
- Buckeye, Robert. "Form as the Extension of Content: 'their existence in my eyes'.” Review of Contemporary Fiction 3.1 (1983): 192–195.
- Wall, Eamonn. "Aidan Higgins’s Balcony of Europe: Stephen Dedalus Hits the Road". Colby Quarterly Winter 1995: 81–87.
- Golden, Sean. "Parsing Love’s Complainte: Aidan Higgins on the Need to Name". Review of Contemporary Fiction 3.1 (1983): 210–220.
- Healy, Dermot. "Donkey’s Years: A Review", Asylum Arts Review Vol. 1, Issue 1, (Autumn 1995): 45–6.
- Healy, Dermot. "Towards Bornholm Night-Ferry and Texts For the Air: A Rereading of Aidan Higgins". Review of Contemporary Fiction 3.1 (1983): 181–192.
- Imhof, Rüdiger. "Bornholm Night-Ferry and Journal to Stella: Aidan Higgins’s Indebtedness to Jonathan Swift". The Canadian Journal of Irish Studies, X, 2 (December 1984), 5–13.
- Imhof, Rüdiger, and Jürgen Kamm. "Coming to Grips with Aidan Higgins’s Killachter Meadow: An Analysis". Études Irlandaises (Lillie 1984): 145–60.
- Imhof, Rüdiger. "German Influences on John Banville and Aidan Higgins", in: W. Zach & H. Kosok (eds), Literary Interrelations. Ireland, England and the World, vol. II: Comparison and Impact. Tübingen: Narr, 1987: 335–47.
- Kreilkamp, Vera. "Reinventing a Form: The Big House in Aidan Higgins’s Langrishe Go Down". The Canadian Journal of Irish Studies 11, 2 (1985): 27–38.
  - Reprinted in, Kreilkamp, Vera. The Anglo-Irish Novel and the Big House. New York: Syracuse University Press, October 1998: 234–60.
- Lubbers, Klaus. "Balcony of Europe: The Trend towards Internationalisation in Recent Irish Fiction", in Zach & Kosok (eds), Literary Interrelations. Ireland, England and the World, vol. II: Comparison and Impact. Tübingen: Gunter Narr 1987: 235–47.
- Mahon, Derek. "An anatomy of melancholy": Review of Dog Days. The Irish Times, 7 March 1998: 67.
- Murphy, Neil. "Aidan Higgins". The Review of Contemporary Fiction XXIII No. 3 (2003): 49–83.
- Murphy, Neil. "Aidan Higgins' Fabulous Fictions: Revisiting Felo De Se", in Writing from the Margins: The Aesthetics of Disruption in the Irish Short Story. Ed. Catriona Ryan. Newcastle: Cambridge Scholars Press, 2015: 67–77.
- Murphy, Neil. "Dreams, Departures, Destinations: A Reassessment of the Work of Aidan Higgins". Graph: A Journal of Literature & Ideas 1 (1995): 64–71.
- Murphy, Neil. "Aidan Higgins – The Fragility of Form" in Irish Fiction and Postmodern Doubt: An Analysis of the Epistemological Crisis in Modern Irish Fiction. NY: Edwin Mellen Press, 2004: 37–101.
- Murphy, Neil. "Review of Lions of the Grunewald". Irish University Review 25.1 Spring/Summer 1995: 188–190.
- O’Brien, George. "Goodbye to All That", The Irish Review 7 (Autumn 1989): 89–92.
- O’Brien, George. "Consumed by Memories": Review of Donkey's Years. The Irish Times 10 June 1995: W9.
- O’Brien, George. "On the Pig’s Back": Review of The Whole Hog (2000), in The Irish Times 7 October 2000: 67.
- O’Brien, John. "Scenes From A Receding Past". Review of Contemporary Fiction 1983 (Spring): 164–166.
- O’Neill, Patrick. "Aidan Higgins" in Rüdiger Imhof, ed., Contemporary Irish Novelists Studies in English and Comparative Literature, ed. Michael Kenneally & Wolfgang Zach Tübingen: Gunter Narr Verlag 1990: 93–107.
- Proulx, Annie. "Drift and Mastery": Review of Flotsam & Jetsam. The Washington Post, 16 June 2002 Sunday: T07.
- Rachbauer, Otto. "Aidan Higgins, 'Killachter Meadow' und Langrishe, Go Down sowie Harold Pinters Fernsenfilm Langrishe, Go Down: Variationen eines Motivs", in Siegfried Korninger, ed., A Yearbook of Studies in English and Language and Literature Vol. 3 (Vienna 1986): 135–46.
- Skelton, Robin. "Aidan Higgins and the Total Book", in Mosaic 19 (1976): pp. 27–37;
  - Reprinted as Chap. 13 of Skelton, Robin. Celtic Contraries. NY: Syracuse University Press, 1990: pp. 211–23.
