= Ferdinand Kingsley =

English actor

- Born: Ferdinand James M. Kingsley; Leamington Spa, Warwickshire, England
- Education: Warwick School; Guildhall School of Music and Drama
- Occupation: Actor
- Years active: 2007–present
- Parents: Ben Kingsley (father); Alison Sutcliffe (mother)

Ferdinand James M. Kingsley is an English actor. He is known for portraying the roles of Hamza Bey in the film Dracula Untold (2014), Mr. Francatelli in the television series Victoria (2016–2019), Irving Thalberg in the film Mank (2020), Hob Gadling in the Netflix adaptation of The Sandman (2022), and the mysterious villain A.M. in Reacher on Amazon Prime Video (2023).

== Early life ==
Ferdinand James M. Kingsley was born in Leamington Spa, Warwickshire, the son of actor Ben Kingsley and theatre director Alison Sutcliffe. He is of predominantly English descent; his paternal grandfather was of Khoja Gujarati descent and one of his great-grandfathers was believed by the family to have been of either German-Jewish or Russian-Jewish descent.

Kingsley attended the RSC theatre nursery, Warwick School and the Guildhall School of Music and Drama.

== Career ==
Kingsley's theatre credits include Troilus and Cressida, and Little Eyolf for the Royal Shakespeare Company. He played Rosencrantz in the National Theatre's 2010–11 production of Hamlet, for which he received a commendation at the 2010 Ian Charleson Awards, and Phaeax in Welcome to Thebes.

In the film The Last Legion he played Young Ambrosinus in flashbacks to the younger days of the character Ambrosinus, played by his father Ben Kingsley. He took the part of Albert Aurier in the BBC production Vincent Van Gogh: Painted With Words. He plays Bushy in Richard II, which is part of the BBC's The Hollow Crown series of Shakespeare's history plays aired in Summer 2012.

He played both Jesus and God the Father in the August 2012 production of the York Mystery Plays. In 2013, Kingsley played the part of murdered Jewish anarchist Joshua Bloom in the BBC period crime drama Ripper Street, and filmed prominent roles in Agatha Christie's Poirot: Elephants Can Remember, the BBC feature film The Whale as Obed Hendricks, and Universal Pictures' 2014 feature Dracula Untold as Hamza Bey. In Spring 2013, Kingsley starred in the short film Dance in Colour by The Crookes. From 2016 to 2019, Kingsley starred in ITV's drama Victoria as Italian British cook Charles Elmé Francatelli. In 2020, he played Irving Thalberg in the film Mank (2020). In 2022, Kingsley featured in the Netflix series The Sandman as Hob Gadling in episode 6, "The Sound of Her Wings".

In 2023, Kingsley portrayed George Wilkins in the series Silo on Apple TV+, and the mysterious villain A.M. in Reacher (season 2) on Amazon Prime Video.

On the air, he has portrayed Aldrich Kemp in the series “Who is Aldrich Kemp”, “Who Killed Aldrich Kemp”, and “Aldrich Kemp and the Rose of Pamir” by Julian Simpson.

== Filmography ==
=== Film ===
Year	Title	Role	Notes
2007	The Last Legion	Young Ambrosinus	
2014	Dracula Untold	Hamza Bey	
2020	Mank	Irving Thalberg	
2026	Supergirl	Elias Knoll	

=== Television ===
Year	Title	Role	Notes
2010	Painted with Words	Albert Aurier	TV movie
2012	The Hollow Crown	Sir John Bushy	Episode: "Richard II"
2013	Ripper Street	Joshua Bloom	Episode: "Tournament of Shadows"
2013	Agatha Christie's Poirot	Desmond Burton-Cox	Episode: "Elephants Can Remember"
2013	The Whale	Obed Hendricks	TV movie
2014	Borgia	Giulio d'Este	Episodes: "1503, Part One","1503, Part Two", "1504","1506" and "1507"
2016–2019	Victoria	Charles Elmé Francatelli	Main cast
2017	Still Star-Crossed	Aldo Lazzara	Episodes: "Pluck Out the Heart of My Mystery", "Nature Hath Framed Strange Fellows in Her Time" and "Hell Is Empty and All the Devils Are Here"
2017	Doctor Who	Neville Catchlove	Episode: "Empress of Mars"
2022–2025	The Sandman	Hob Gadling	Episodes: "The Sound of Her Wings", "Season of Mists", "Fuel for the Fire", "A Tale of Graceful Ends"
2023	Silo	George Wilkins	Episodes: "Freedom Day", "Holston's Pick", "The Relic", "The Getaway" and "Outside"
2023–2024	Reacher	A. M.	Main cast

=== Radio ===
Year	Title	Role	Notes
2022	Who Is Aldrich Kemp?	Aldrich Kemp	BBC Radio 4
2023	Who Killed Aldrich Kemp?	Aldrich Kemp	BBC Radio 4
2019–2023	The Lovecraft Investigations	Slide	BBC Radio 4

== Stage ==
Year	Title	Role	Notes
2024	The Comeuppance	Paco	Almeida Theatre, London
