= Defence of the Realm =

1986 British film by David Drury

- Theatrical release poster
- Directed by: David Drury
- Written by: Martin Stellman
- Produced by: Robin Douet; Lynda Myles
- Starring: Gabriel Byrne; Greta Scacchi; Denholm Elliott; Ian Bannen; Bill Paterson; Fulton Mackay
- Cinematography: Roger Deakins
- Edited by: Michael Bradsell
- Music by: Richard Harvey
- Production company: Enigma Productions
- Distributed by: Rank Film Distributors
- Release dates: 21 November 1985 (London Film Festival); 24 January 1986 (General release)
- Running time: 96 minutes
- Country: United Kingdom
- Language: English
- Budget: £2,500,000
- Box office: $750,000

Defence of the Realm is a 1986 British political thriller film directed by David Drury, starring Gabriel Byrne, Greta Scacchi, and Denholm Elliott, with Robbie Coltrane in a minor role.

The film takes its title from the Defence of the Realm Act 1914, passed in the United Kingdom at the start of the First World War, which gave the government wide-ranging powers during the war.

It was shot at Shepperton Studios and on location in London and Duxford in Cambridgeshire. The film's sets were designed by the art director Roger Murray-Leach. The film was distributed in the United Kingdom by the Rank Organisation.

The plot mirrors the real-life British spy scandal known as the Profumo affair.

== Plot ==
On a foggy night a car containing two men is pursued by police. The radio is discussing the country being on high alert due to a terrorist attack in Ankara. Going down a dead end road and forced to stop, (Steven) escapes over a high barbed-wire fence, but the other one is caught.

Dennis Markham (Ian Bannen), a prominent Member of Parliament (MP), is reported by a London paper to have been seen leaving a woman's home on the same evening as she is visited by a military attaché from East Germany. Is he a KGB agent? Markham's loyalty to his country is questioned. The media men debate whether or not to print the story.

Vernon Bayliss (Denholm Elliott), Nick Mullen (Gabriel Byrne) and Jack Macleod (Bill Paterson) all work together for the Daily Despatch. Bayliss is sent for a private meeting with Markham and explains the link to the German agent (which Markham is unaware of). Meanwhile, Mullen interviews Nina Beckman (Greta Scacchi), Markham's secretary, and then speaks to Markham's wife while, initially, pretending to be a policeman.

The story, written by Mullen, breaks as the "Markham Affair" on television and throughout the newspapers.

Markham is hounded by the media and forced to resign.

Mullen continues his work alongside Bayliss, who suspects that Markham was framed. When Bayliss dies from a supposed heart attack the same night as Bayliss's flat is ransacked by someone who was not after money or valuables, Mullen suspects something deeper at work. He breaks into Bayliss's desk and finds press-cuttings and a tape which insinuates a different motive behind the attack on Markham.

Mullen visits the young man in prison (caught by police at the start of the film) telling him that his accomplice is dead. This leads him to go to the site where the film began; a high security, but seemingly unmanned military base actually run by the USAF near the village of Brandon. Mullen realises that the USAF presence in the UK involves a nuclear weapon capability and Markham seems linked to aims to rid the UK of such things. This may have been the motive to start a smear campaign.

With the help of Nina Beckman, Mullen continues to investigate the affair, despite a break-in at his flat, surveillance and other attempts to stop him.

When he goes to publish the story, his editor calls him in to say it is a great story but they cannot publish due to the Official Secrets Act. Moreover, the newspaper owner, Kingsbrook (a character akin to Lord Beaverbrook), has personally intervened to make sure it isn't published. But how did he know it existed?

Mullen discovers the "KGB agent" was actually a British agent, so asks an editor at his newspaper where they got the source that said he was KGB and is given the name Anthony Clegg (Oliver Ford Davies). But when he confronts Clegg in a gentleman's club, he is grabbed by three plain clothes police men and driven to a government building for questioning by three unnamed senior government officials who question him about his 'patriotism' and whether he thinks its wise to run the story when it would be against the 'National Interest'. When he insists he will run the story he is escorted of the building, which he discovers is near Parliament.

Mullen returns to his ransacked flat then Nina arrives but as she steps inside, a bomb goes off, but Nina had already posted the incriminating evidence to Germany and the story of the near-nuclear-disaster spreads across the globe through the European press.

The film does not confirm if Mullen or Nina were killed or not.

== Cast ==
- Gabriel Byrne as Nicholas "Nick" Mullen
- Greta Scacchi as Nina Beckman
- Denholm Elliott as Vernon Bayliss
- Ian Bannen as Dennis Markham
- Fulton Mackay as Victor Kingsbrook
- Bill Paterson as Jack Macleod
- David Calder as Harry Champion
- Frederick Treves as Arnold Reece
- Robbie Coltrane as Leo McAskey
- Annabel Leventon as Trudy Markham
- Graham Fletcher-Cook as Micky Parker
- Danny Webb as Danny Royce, The Photographer
- Prentis Hancock as Frank Longman
- Mark Tandy as Philip Henderson
- Oliver Ford Davies as Anthony Clegg
- George Ellis Jones as D.C.S. Catterick
- Lyndon Brook as Pugh
- Philip Whitchurch as Cuttings Librarian
- Laurance Rudic as Charlie
- James Fleet as Clegg's Assistant In The Ministry

== Production ==
The script was written by Martin Stellman. It was read by Lynda Myles, who was working at David Puttnam's Enigma Productions. She tried unsuccessfully to raise finance from Warner Bros and Goldcrest. Eventually she secured half the budget from the Rank Organisation with the rest coming from the NFFC. It was shot over six weeks from March to May 1985.

The film had a very poor preview screening and Rank threatened to pull any further finance. However David Puttnam successfully persuaded them the preview audience had been correct and that the film just needed a few additional days of screening; Rank agreed.

== Reception ==
Halliwell's Film Guide described it as an "efficient political melodrama, basically too old-fashioned to start a cult". Denholm Elliott's performance has been singled out for particular praise. Roger Ebert wrote, "The acting is strong throughout, but Elliott is especially effective. What is it about this actor, who has been in so many different kinds of movies and seems to make each role special? Here he is needed to suggest integrity and scruples, and does it almost simply by the way he looks... Defence of the Realm ends on a bleak and cynical note – unless you count the somewhat contrived epilogue – and gets there with intelligence and a sharp, bitter edge." Radio Times gave the film four stars out of five, writing, "The role of the sozzled veteran reporter who for once finds himself involved in a meaningful story is brought wonderfully to life by Denholm Elliott... Gabriel Byrne, as Elliott's ambitious young colleague, is less effective, but the film has plenty of tension and co-star Greta Scacchi proves a worthy accomplice."

== Awards ==
- Denholm Elliott won his third consecutive BAFTA Award for Best Actor in a Supporting Role.

== Notes ==
- Barrowclough (July 1985). "Defence of the realm". Sight and Sound. p. 191-194.
- Yule, Andrew (1989). Enigma : David Puttnam, the story so far. Sphere Books.
