= Alison Sutcliffe =

British theatre director

Alison Sutcliffe is a British theatre director who, until 2011, was Artistic Director of The Bridge Project at the Bridge House Theatre, Warwick, during which time she created an ensemble theatre company which produced eleven productions. Her work at Bridge House was described as "prolific".

She has worked with the Royal Shakespeare Company and on Broadway.

She was married actor to Ben Kingsley from 1978 to 1992. They had two sons together, Edmund (born 1982) and actor Ferdinand (born 1988),
