= Beatles Stories =

- Directed by: Seth Swirsky
- Produced by: Seth Swirsky
- Production company: Julukesy Films
- Distributed by: Cinema Libre
- Release date: April 2011 (Newport Beach)
- Country: United States
- Language: English

Beatles Stories: A Fab Four Fan's Ultimate Road Trip is a 2011 documentary film. It consists of filmed interviews that Seth Swirsky conducted with people who had a personal story or recollection about themselves and one or more of The Beatles.

== Synopsis ==
Songwriter Seth Swirsky grew up in the 1960s, a fan of The Beatles. Swirsky was interested in personal stories about The Beatles, and was inspired to make Beatles Stories. He spent eight-years on the film.

== Interviewees ==
Some of the more than 110 individuals that Swirsky interviewed for the film are former personal assistant Fred Seaman, Sir Ben Kingsley, Graham Nash, Art Garfunkel, Justin Hayward of The Moody Blues, actor Jon Voight, Susanna Hoffs, U.S. president daughter Luci Baines Johnson, former New York Yankee Bernie Williams, Rick Nielsen of Cheap Trick, Brian Wilson of The Beach Boys, actor Henry Winkler, Indianapolis Colts football owner Jim Irsay, Smokey Robinson, Donovan, the Beatles' long-time producer Sir George Martin, Lennon's ex-girlfriend May Pang, Beatles engineers Norman Smith, Ken Scott and John Kurlander and American cultural icons Frank Gifford and Bob Eubanks, among others.

== Premieres ==
Beatles Stories was chosen as an Official Selection at the 2011 European Independent Film Festival—considered the Sundance of Europe—and had its world premiere in Paris, France, on April 3, 2011. It was an Official Selection at The 2011 Newport Beach International Film Festival, where it made its North American premiere on April 29, 2011. It made its East Coast premiere at The Gold Coast International Film Festival on June 2, 2011.

It was also an official selection at The 2011 Las Vegas Film Festival, Santa Fe Independent Film Festival, Bend Film Festival, Kansas International Film Festival and the 2012 Fargo Film Festival.

In June 2012, it was screened in London, Manchester and Liverpool.

== DVD release ==
The DVD of the documentary as well as a bonus disc containing an additional 25 interviews was released on June 6, 2012. The DVD also contains a director's commentary track and a featurette with Norman "Hurricane" Smith, the engineer who worked on many of the Beatles' songs.

== Criticism ==
Beatles Stories made news when it was claimed by John Lennon's former personal assistant—one of the over 50 interviewees in the movie—that, by the time of his death, Lennon would have voted for Ronald Reagan in the 1980 elections and, that he was embarrassed by the naivete of his song "Imagine".

== Honors and awards ==
Beatles Stories was nominated for Best Score for an Indie Film or Documentary at the 2013 Hollywood Music in Media Awards.
