= The Red Button =

American band

Background information
- Origin: Los Angeles
- Genres: Power pop
- Years active: 2007–present
- Labels: Grimble
- Members: Mike Ruekberg (left in above picture); Seth Swirsky (right in above picture)

The Red Button is an American power pop band consisting of Seth Swirsky and Mike Ruekberg. Swirsky is a well-known pop songwriter, while Ruekberg is a songwriter and performer in the Los Angeles area. Their debut album, She's About to Cross My Mind, was released in 2007 by Grimble Records. Their second album, entitled As Far As Yesterday Goes, was released on June 21, 2011.

== Biography ==
Swirsky's music credentials include hit songs for dozens of artists, including Rufus Wainwright (Instant Pleasure), Al Green, Tina Turner and Taylor Dayne (Tell it to my heart and Prove Your Love) among many others.

In the 1990s, Ruekberg worked as a singer and songwriter for the Minneapolis-based pop-rockers Rex Daisy, who recorded a CD for Geffen Records with producer Paul Fox. Ruekberg also wrote the soundtrack for the indie cult film classic Dummy, starring Adrien Brody.

=== Band ===
The band was featured in The Los Angeles Times as a Buzz Band on August 7, 2007.

=== Album ===
In a year-end 2007 poll of the top pop records of the year, She's About to Cross My Mind was ranked No. 1 (out of 125) by Absolute Powerpop. Pop Journalist and International Pop Overthrow founder David Bash ranked the album No. 8 (out of 125) in his influential year-end list.

Audities ranked The Red Button album 2nd best pop album of the year in their 2007 year-end poll.

A second album by The Red Button, entitled "As Far As Yesterday Goes," was released on June 21, 2011. It was voted No. 7 (out of 748 entries) in the 2011 year-end poll taken by readers of the online music group Audities.

The first single on "As Far As Yesterday Goes" – Caught in the Middle—was named "The Coolest Song in the World" (for the week of July 11, 2011) on "Little Steven" Van Zandt's syndicated radio show The Underground Garage.

The song Picture from The Red Button's second album was nominated for Best Pop Song at the 2011 Hollywood Music and Media Awards in Los Angeles on November 17, 2011.

=== Singles ===

The first single from She's About to Cross My Mind, entitled "Cruel Girl", charted at No. 1 on Little Steven's Underground Garage radio show for the week of July 22, 2007 and was named the 2nd Best Song of 2007 by Popbang Radio. The song was also chosen to be on The Coolest Songs in the World, Volume 4 CD (2008) on Wicked Cool Records. Other songs from She's About to Cross My Mind, have been featured on XM The Loft's "In Spite Of All The Danger" program, Sirius Radio's Idiot's Delight with Vin Scelsa as well as radio stations around the world.

The first single on "As Far As Yesterday Goes" – Caught in the Middle—was named "The Coolest Song in the World Week" (for the week of July 11, 2011) on "Little Steven" Van Zandt's syndicated radio show The Underground Garage.

== Honors ==
The Red Button was named to Music Connection Magazine's 2011 Hot 100 Unsigned Artist list.
