= Betrayal (1983 film) =

- Theatrical release poster
- Directed by: David Jones
- Screenplay by: Harold Pinter
- Based on: Betrayal by Harold Pinter
- Produced by: Sam Spiegel
- Starring: Jeremy Irons; Ben Kingsley; Patricia Hodge
- Cinematography: Mike Fash
- Edited by: John Bloom
- Music by: Dominic Muldowney
- Production company: Horizon Pictures
- Distributed by: Virgin Films
- Release date: 19 February 1983
- Running time: 95 minutes
- Country: United Kingdom
- Language: English

Betrayal is a 1983 British drama film adaptation of Harold Pinter's 1978 play. With a semi-autobiographical screenplay by Pinter, the film was produced by Sam Spiegel and directed by David Jones. It was critically well received. Distributed by 20th Century Fox International Classics in the United States, it was first screened in movie theaters in New York in February 1983.

== Plot ==
Betrayal follows significant moments in the seven-year extramarital affair of art gallery owner Emma with literary agent Jerry, the best friend of her husband Robert, a London publisher. Nine sequences are shown in reverse chronological order with Emma and Jerry meeting for the first time at the conclusion of the film.

== Cast ==
- Jeremy Irons as Jerry
- Ben Kingsley as Robert
- Patricia Hodge as Emma
- Avril Elgar as Mrs. Banks
- Ray Marioni as Waiter
- Caspar Norman as Sam
- Chloe Billington as Charlotte, age five
- Hannah Davies as Charlotte, age nine
- Michael König as Ned, age two
- Alexander McIntosh as Ned, age five

== Production ==
Screenwriter Harold Pinter based the drama on his seven-year (1962–69) clandestine affair with television presenter Joan Bakewell, who was married to producer-director Michael Bakewell. At the time, Pinter was married to actress Vivien Merchant.

== Reception ==
New York Times film critic Vincent Canby said Harold Pinter is "justifiably celebrated" and that "nothing he has written for the stage has ever been as simply and grandly realized on the screen as his Betrayal". He applauded the performances of the three lead actors, the direction, and the meaningful application of reverse chronology, and summed up that "I can't think of another recent film that is simultaneously so funny, so moving and so rigorously unsentimental. ... This is pure Pinter well served by collaborators." Chicago Sun-Times film critic Roger Ebert similarly commented that the film's reverse chronology, far from being a gimmick, is the key element to its brilliance. He gave the movie four stars.

Dave Kehr of the Chicago Reader, by contrast, argued that "The reverse-order gimmick of Harold Pinter's screenplay seems meant to revitalize some trite and tedious material—the breakup of a love affair—yet the expected literary games don't materialize: the film plods backward in time with the same dull linearity it would have moving forward." He praised Kingsley's performance but gave the film an overall negative assessment. Geoff Andrew likewise wrote in Time Out, "Hodge is fine, Kingsley tries his best, and Irons is as tight-assed as ever. But it's all so uncinematic as to make one wonder why it was ever made in the first place." Variety commented that Patricia Hodge gave a much less compelling performance than the other two leads but summed up the film as "an absorbing, quietly amusing chamber drama for those attuned to Harold Pinter’s way with words."

== Accolades ==
Award	Category	Nominee(s)	Result
Academy Awards	Best Adapted Screenplay	Harold Pinter	Nominated
British Academy Film Awards	Best Adapted Screenplay	Harold Pinter	Nominated
Evening Standard British Film Awards	Best Actor	Ben Kingsley	Won
National Board of Review Awards	Best Film		Won (Note: Tied with Terms of Endearment.)
National Board of Review Awards	Top Ten Films		Won (Note: Tied with Terms of Endearment.)
