= You Kill Me =

- Theatrical release poster
- Directed by: John Dahl
- Written by: Christopher Markus; Stephen McFeely
- Produced by: Téa Leoni; Howard Rosenman
- Starring: Ben Kingsley; Téa Leoni; Luke Wilson; Dennis Farina
- Cinematography: Jeffrey Jur
- Edited by: Scott Chestnut
- Music by: Marcelo Zarvos
- Distributed by: IFC Films
- Release date: June 22, 2007
- Running time: 93 minutes
- Country: United States
- Language: English
- Budget: $4 million
- Box office: $3.7 million

You Kill Me is 2007 crime comedy film directed by John Dahl, and starring Ben Kingsley, Téa Leoni, Luke Wilson and Dennis Farina.

The film was generally well received by critics, but performed only modestly at the box office. It marks the last feature film to date of director John Dahl, before he moved into television directing.

== Plot ==
Frank Falenczyk is an alcoholic hit man for a Polish mob family in Buffalo, New York. He puts his family in peril by failing to prevent Eddie O'Leary, a soldier in a rival family, from boarding a train for New York and organising the Chinese against them. Frank's uncle Roman Krzeminski, head of the family, gives him an ultimatum: go to San Francisco and join Alcoholics Anonymous or leave the family.

Frank ducks out early from his first AA meeting and encounters Dave, Roman's contact, who forces him to accept a job at a funeral parlour where he meets Laurel Pearson, a quirky client. They begin dating. Frank confesses to his sponsor Tom that he wants to be free of his drinking problem because it's affecting his abilities as a mob hitman. Frank's cousin Stef calls and tells Frank an upstart Irish gang is threatening the family snow-plowing business, and Stef's partner and child are fleeing to safety in Florida.

Frank starts driking again during an Irish wake in the parlour, and forgets a dinner at Laurel's. After the wake, he offers a couple a ride home. While waiting for the husband in the car, the woman reclines Frank's seat back to kiss him, and he presses the accelerator and crashes the car. Frank is knocked unconscious and the woman tells her husband Frank kissed her. He drags Frank from the car and leaves him in a puddle. Frank returns home the next morning, confesses drinking again, and takes her to an AA meeting. He confesses his life of crime, and while Tom is supportive, the other AA members are shocked.

On a bowling date, Laurel tries to understand how he got involved in organized crime. Frank shows her his scrupulous records, and tries to make token restitution by sending gift cards to the families of men he killed unnecessarily badly because he was drunk.

Dave asks Frank to do something about a building inspector threatening to condemn a building his real estate agency wants to sell. Laurel encourages him to take the job. Frank's diplomatic methods fail and he finally obtains the inspector's cooperation by pulling a gun on him. Frank celebrates his homicide-free success with Tom and Laurel. When Laurel chooses not to stay over after the celebration, Frank turns to drink once more. Dave encounters him in a bar, thanks him for his help, then calls him a loser. Frank sees Laurel waiting for him at home, and hides his drunkenness.

Back in Buffalo, Frank's uncle is gunned down with two other family members. Frank returns home to face the rival Irish gang and help Stef. Laurel helps him kill O'Leary and they return to San Francisco where he celebrates his one year anniversary of joining AA.

== Cast ==
- Ben Kingsley as Frank Falenczyk
- Téa Leoni as Laurel Pearson
- Luke Wilson as Tom
- Dennis Farina as Edward O'Leary
- Philip Baker Hall as Roman Krzeminski
- Bill Pullman as Dave
- Marcus Thomas as Stef Krzeminski
- Jayne Eastwood as Kathleen Fitzgerald

== Reception ==
The film was well received by critics. On the review aggregator website Rotten Tomatoes, 79% of 113 critics' reviews are positive, with an average rating of 6.7/10. The website's consensus reads: "Featuring wonderful performances from Ben Kingsley and Tea Leoni, You Kill Me is a charming, funny take on the familiar inner-lives-of-hit-men premise."Metacritic, which uses a weighted average, assigned the film a score of 64 out of 100, based on 25 critics, indicating "generally favorable" reviews.

You Kill Me performed modestly at the box office, returning $3.7 on a budget of $4 million.
