= Ben Kingsley =

English actor (born 1943)

Sir Ben Kingsley
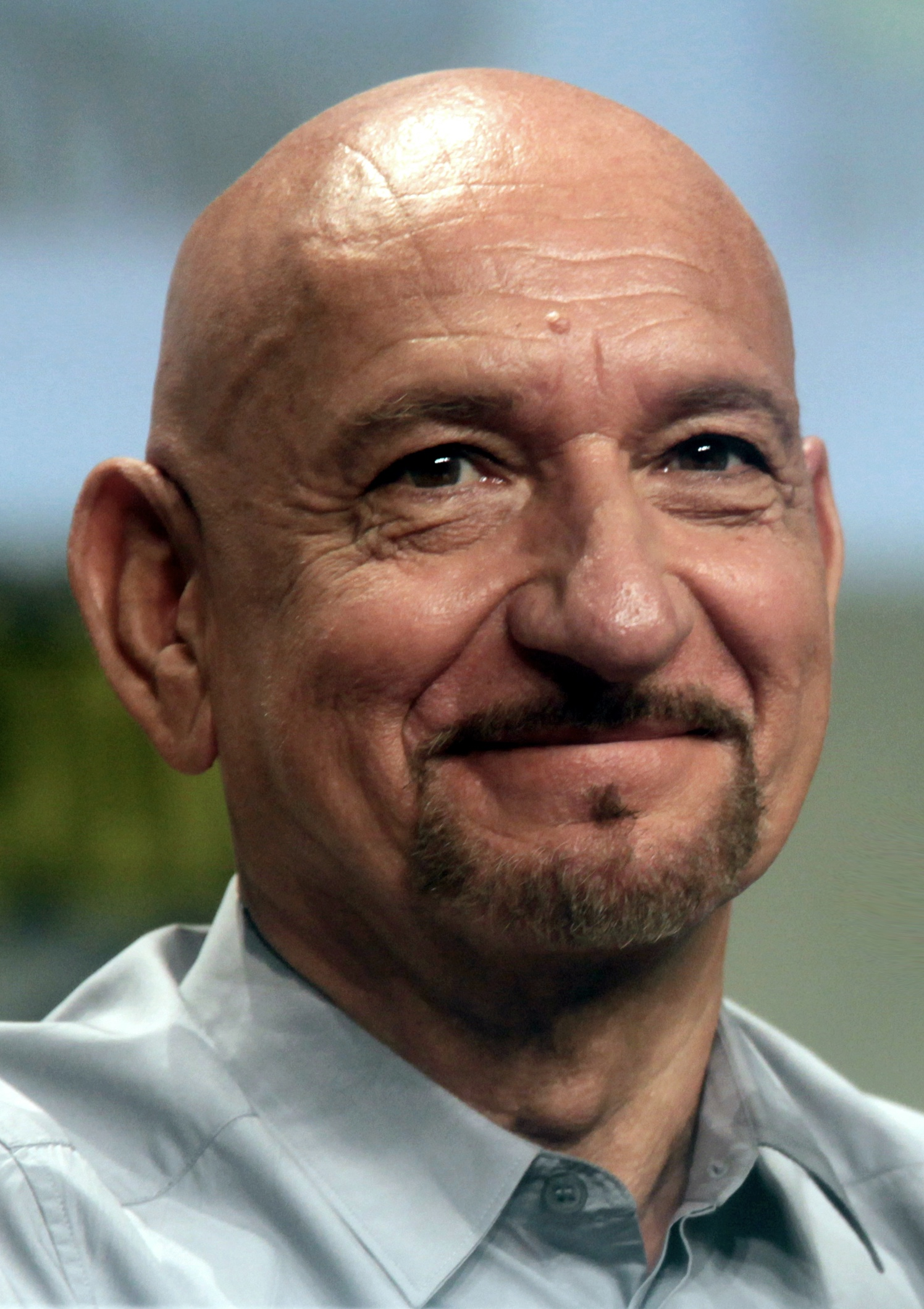
- Kingsley in 2014
- Born: Krishna Pandit Bhanji; 31 December 1943 (age 82); Snainton, North Riding of Yorkshire, England
- Occupation: Actor
- Years active: 1967–present
- Works: Full list
- Spouses: Angela Morant (m. 1966; div. 1976); Alison Sutcliffe (m. 1978; div. 1992); Alexandra Christmann (m. 2003; div. 2005); Daniela Lavender (m. 2007)
- Children: 4, including Ferdinand
- Awards: Full list

Sir Ben Kingsley (born Krishna Pandit Bhanji; 31 December 1943) is a British actor. He has received various accolades throughout his career spanning seven decades, including an Academy Award, a BAFTA Award, a Grammy Award, and two Golden Globe Awards as well as nominations for four Primetime Emmy Awards and two Laurence Olivier Awards. Kingsley was appointed Knight Bachelor in 2002 for services to drama. He was awarded a star on the Hollywood Walk of Fame in 2010 and received the Britannia Award in 2014.

Born to an English mother and an Indian Gujarati father with roots in Jamnagar, Kingsley began his career in theatre, joining the Royal Shakespeare Company in 1967 and spending the next 15 years appearing mainly on stage. His starring roles included productions of As You Like It (his West End debut for the company at the Aldwych Theatre in 1967), Much Ado About Nothing, Richard III, The Tempest, A Midsummer Night's Dream, Hamlet and The Merry Wives of Windsor. Also known for his television roles, he received four Primetime Emmy Award nominations for his performances in Murderers Among Us: The Simon Wiesenthal Story (1989), Joseph (1995), Anne Frank: The Whole Story (2001), and Mrs. Harris (2006).

In film, Kingsley is principally known for his starring role as Mahatma Gandhi in Richard Attenborough's Gandhi (1982), for which he won the Academy Award for Best Actor and BAFTA Award for Best Actor in a Leading Role. For his portrayal of Itzhak Stern in Steven Spielberg's Schindler's List (1993), he received a BAFTA Award for Best Actor in a Supporting Role nomination. He was Oscar-nominated for Bugsy (1990), Sexy Beast (2000), and House of Sand and Fog (2003). His other notable films include Maurice (1987), Sneakers (1992), Dave (1993), Searching for Bobby Fischer (1993), Death and the Maiden (1994), Twelfth Night (1996), A.I. Artificial Intelligence (2001), Tuck Everlasting (2002), Lucky Number Slevin (2006), Elegy (2008), Shutter Island (2010), and Hugo (2011).

Kingsley has played the character of Trevor Slattery in the Marvel Cinematic Universe for over a decade, appearing in the films Iron Man 3 (2013) and Shang-Chi and the Legend of the Ten Rings (2021), the short film All Hail the King (2014), and the Disney+ series Wonder Man (2026). He also acted in the blockbusters Prince of Persia: The Sands of Time (2010), and Ender's Game (2013) and provided his voice in the films The Boxtrolls (2014) and The Jungle Book (2016).

== Early life, education and ancestry ==
Kingsley was born Krishna Pandit Bhanji on 31 December 1943, in Snainton, North Riding of Yorkshire. His mother, Anna Lyna Mary (née Goodman) (1914–2010), was an English actress and model, and she later gave birth to a second son named Sadrudin Bhanji, who later practised as a psychiatrist in Devon. She was born out of wedlock and "was loath to speak of her background". His father, Rahimtulla Harji Bhanji (1914–1968), was born in Zanzibar (now part of Tanzania) to a family originating from the Indian city of Jamnagar, of Khoja Gujarati descent.

Kingsley grew up in Pendlebury, Lancashire. Although his father was a Gujarati Khoja who practised Isma'ili Shia Islam, Kingsley was not raised in his father's faith; he is a Quaker. He was educated at Manchester Grammar School, where one of his classmates was actor Robert Powell. Kingsley went on to study at De La Salle College in Salford, which later became home to The Ben Kingsley Theatre. While at college, he became involved in amateur dramatics in Manchester, making his professional stage debut on graduation, aged 23.

Kingsley's paternal grandfather, Harji Bhanji, was a successful spice trader who had moved from India to the Sultanate of Zanzibar, where Kingsley's father lived until moving to the United Kingdom at the age of 14. Kingsley's maternal grandfather was believed by the family to have been of Russian or German-Jewish descent, while his maternal grandmother was English and worked in the garment district of London's East End. Kingsley stated in 1994, "I'm not Jewish, and though there might be some Russian-Jewish heritage way back on my mother's side, the thread is so fine there's no real evidence."

== Career ==
=== 1967–1981: Stage work and early career ===
After graduating, in 1966, Kingsley was approached by music producer and manager Dick James. James, who was the publisher of The Beatles, offered to mould Kingsley into a pop star. Kingsley declined James' offer, and instead chose to join the Royal Shakespeare Company (RSC) in 1967 after an audition before Trevor Nunn. Devoting himself almost exclusively to stage work for the next 15 years, he made his West End debut for the company at the Aldwych Theatre in 1967 in a production of As You Like It. Further productions for the RSC included Much Ado About Nothing, Richard III, The Tempest, A Midsummer Night's Dream (starring in Peter Brook's acclaimed 1970 RSC production as Demetrius), Hamlet and The Merry Wives of Windsor.

In the 1960s, Kingsley changed his name to Ben Kingsley, fearing that a foreign name would hamper his career. He told the Radio Times, "As soon as I changed my name, I got the jobs. I had one audition as Krishna Bhanji and they said, 'Beautiful audition but we don't quite know how to place you in our forthcoming season.' I changed my name, crossed the road, and they said when can you start?" In 1971 Kingsley made his Broadway debut playing Demetrius in the revival of William Shakespeare's A Midsummer Night's Dream acting with Patrick Stewart, Frances de la Tour and Martin Best. He played Mosca in Peter Hall's 1977 production of Ben Jonson's Volpone for the Royal National Theatre. In 1981 he returned to Broadway playing the title role in the Raymond Fitzsimmons play Edmund Kean (1983). He played Willy Loman in a 1982 Sydney production of the Arthur Miller play Death of a Salesman opposite Mel Gibson.

Kingsley began his transition to film roles early on, making his feature film debut playing a supporting role in the British action thriller Fear Is the Key in 1972. Kingsley continued to play small roles in both film and television, including a role as Ron Jenkins on the soap opera Coronation Street from 1966 to 1967 and regular appearances as a defence counsel in the long-running British legal programme Crown Court. In 1974 he played Thidias in a taped performance of the William Shakespeare play Antony and Cleopatra with the Royal Shakespeare Company. He acted alongside Patrick Stewart and Tim Pigott-Smith. In 1975, he starred as Dante Gabriel Rossetti in the historical drama The Love School and appeared in the TV miniseries Dickens of London the following year.

=== 1982–1998: Transition to film and television ===
A turning point in Kingsley's career came with the historical biographical epic drama film Gandhi (1982), directed by Richard Attenborough, in which Kingsley played the titular role of the anti-colonialist activist and peacemaker Mahatma Gandhi. The film was a critical and financial success with film critic Roger Ebert of The Chicago Sun-Times praising the casting of Kingsley in the lead role writing, "makes the role so completely his own that there is a genuine feeling that the spirit of Gandhi is on the screen. Kingsley's performance is powerful without being loud or histrionic; he is almost always quiet, observant, and soft-spoken on the screen, and yet his performance comes across with such might that we realize, afterward, that the sheer moral force of Gandhi must have been behind the words." Kingsley went on to win numerous accolades for his performance including the Academy Award for Best Actor, the BAFTA Award for Best Actor in a Leading Role, and the Golden Globe Award for Best Actor – Motion Picture Drama for his performance.

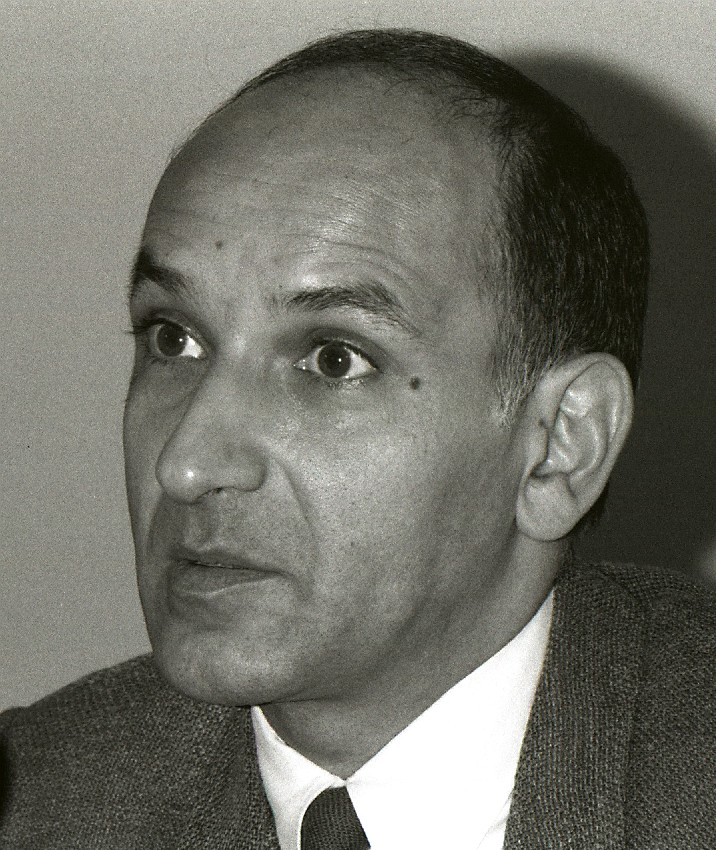
Kingsley in Sweden (1983)

Following the success of the film Gandhi, Kingsley appeared in a variety of films, including the 1983 British drama film Betrayal, which was an adaptation of the 1978 play of the same title by Harold Pinter and also features actors, Jeremy Irons and Patricia Hodge. For this performance, Kingsley won the Evening Standard British Film Awards.

In 1985, Kingsley appeared in the John Irvin directed British drama Turtle Diary, which co-starred Glenda Jackson. This film was based on the 1975 novel of the same title and was adapted for the screen by Harold Pinter. Sheila Benson of The Los Angeles Times praised their performances writing, "No filmic cliches, no swelling musical score; these are no "littul peeple" who melt into each other's arms, but blessedly real people, who get exhausted and don't talk all the time." During that same year, he appeared in the BBC adaptation of Silas Marner as the titular character.

In 1987, Kingsley acted in the Merchant-Ivory costume drama Maurice. This film was adapted from the 1971 novel of the same title by E. M. Forster and it also features the actors Hugh Grant, Rupert Graves, Simon Callow, and Denholm Elliott. The following year, Kingsley played multiple roles including the Russian composer Dmitri Shostakovich in Testimony, Basil Pascali in Pascali's Island and Dr. John Watson in Without a Clue.

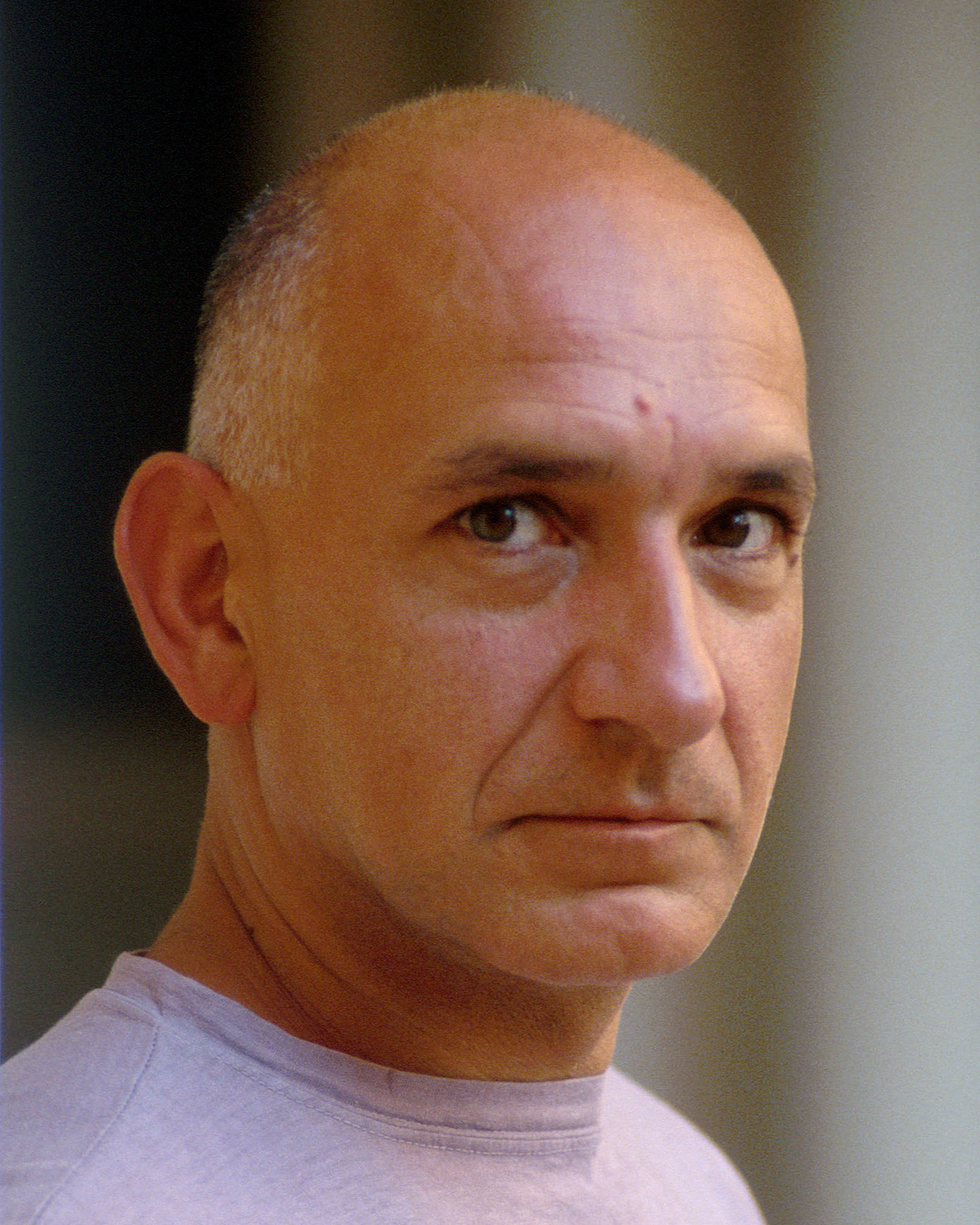
Kingsley at the Venice Film Festival (1990)

In 1991, Kingsley was nominated for an Academy Award for Best Supporting Actor for his portrayal of the organised crime figure Meyer Lansky in Bugsy. Shortly thereafter, he played the supporting character of Cosmo in the thriller film Sneakers (1992), Vice-President Gary Nance in Dave (1993) and the chess teacher Bruce Pandolfini in Searching for Bobby Fischer (1993).

In 1993, Kingsley portrayed the Holocaust survivor Itzhak Stern alongside Liam Neeson as Oskar Schindler in Steven Spielberg's historical drama film, Schindler's List. The film was a critical and commercial success, and Kingsley received a nomination for BAFTA Award for Best Actor in a Supporting Role. Todd McCarthy of Variety wrote of his performance, "Kingsley must act within much more rigid constraints as his trusted accountant Stern, a man who feels he must never make a misstep. Role is reminiscent of Alec Guinness' deluded Col. Nicholson in The Bridge on the River Kwai; in his compulsion to do a perfect job for Schindler, he often seems to forget that he's working for the enemy."

In 1994, Kingsley starred alongside Sigourney Weaver in Roman Polanski's Death and the Maiden, having previously acted with her in Dave. Two years later, Kingsley portrayed Feste in Twelfth Night, a film adaptation of the William Shakespeare play, which also features the actors Helena Bonham Carter, Nigel Hawthorne, and Richard E. Grant. In a mixed review, Todd McCarthy of Variety noted his performance as a highlight writing, "Ben Kingsley brings some nice readings to his rather mysterious role of Feste, the commentator on the convoluted proceedings."

In 1997, Kingsley provided a voice in the video game Ceremony of Innocence. The following year, he was the head of the jury at the 48th Berlin International Film Festival and starred in the family film Spooky House, saying he had chosen a role in a lighter film after acting in roles that left him feeling traumatised.

=== 1999–present: Further success ===
Kingsley took on the role of Don Logan, a violent psychopath and recruiter for London's underworld, in Jonathan Glazer's Sexy Beast (2000), a psychological black comedy crime film acting with Ray Winstone and Ian McShane. Critic Peter Bradshaw of The Guardian praised his performance writing, "The role of Don Logan is perfectly suited to Ben Kingsley's gifts for control and stillness. There is something a little baroque and stylised about his approach – it is arguably a little actorly and unlike the behaviour of any real villain. But it is a very funny, intelligent performance nonetheless, beautifully scripted and acted, and Kingsley tops it off with a bravura show of pure sociopathic cunning". Kingsley's role as Logan earned him another Academy Award nomination for Best Supporting Actor. A year later, he won a Crystal Globe award for having an outstanding artistic contribution to world cinema at the Karlovy Vary International Film Festival. In 2003 he portrayed Colonel Massoud Amir Behrani in the Vadim Perelman directed House of Sand and Fog acting opposite Jennifer Connelly and Shohreh Aghdashloo. Critic Owen Gleiberman of Entertainment Weekly wrote of his performance, "Kingsley, carrying his body like armor, sculpting each line into a bitter dart of pride, plays fierceness with a powerful tug of sorrow." For his role he earned nominations for the Academy Award, Golden Globe Award, and Independent Spirit Award for Best Actor. The following year he played a supporting role as Benjamin O'Ryan in the psychological thriller Suspect Zero (2004). Although the film received negative reviews from critics, reservations were made for Kingsley's performance.

In July 2006, Kingsley received an Primetime Emmy Award for Outstanding Lead Actor in a Limited Series or Movie nomination for his performance in the HBO television film Mrs. Harris (2005), in which he played famed cardiologist Herman Tarnower, who was murdered by his jilted lover, Jean Harris played by Annette Bening. Later that year, he made a cameo appearance in an episode of The Sopranos titled "Luxury Lounge". Kingsley plays himself in the episode as Chris and Little Carmine pitch him the role of a mob boss in the film Cleaver, which he turns down. In 2007, Kingsley appeared as a Polish American mobster in the Mafia comedy You Kill Me, and a hitman in War, Inc. The following year he acted in the romantic drama Elegy (2008) directed by Isabel Coixet. He starred alongside Penélope Cruz, Peter Sarsgaard, Patricia Clarkson, and Dennis Hopper. Critic Roger Ebert wrote of the film and his performance, "Ben Kingsley, who can play just about any role, seems to be especially effective playing slimy intellectuals. "Elegy" is a film that could have been made for him, although by the time it's over, Penélope Cruz has slipped away with it, and transformed Kingsley's character in the process. It's nicely done." Kingsley received a nomination for the London Film Critics Circle Award for Best British Actor of the Year.

The years 2010 and 2011 contained several big roles for Kingsley. In 2010, he worked voicing a character named Sabine in the Lionhead Studios game Fable III and starred alongside Leonardo DiCaprio in Shutter Island (2010), directed by Martin Scorsese. That same year, Kingsley made his Bollywood debut in the thriller Teen Patti (2010). The following year he appeared in Scorsese's next film, the children's adventure film Hugo (2011), playing the French illusionist Georges Méliès. Kingsley's portrayal of Méliès also earned him a Saturn Award for Best Actor. Kingsley also signed on to the sci-fi romance feature Broken Dream. The feature, by Neil Jordan and John Boorman, was later scrapped.

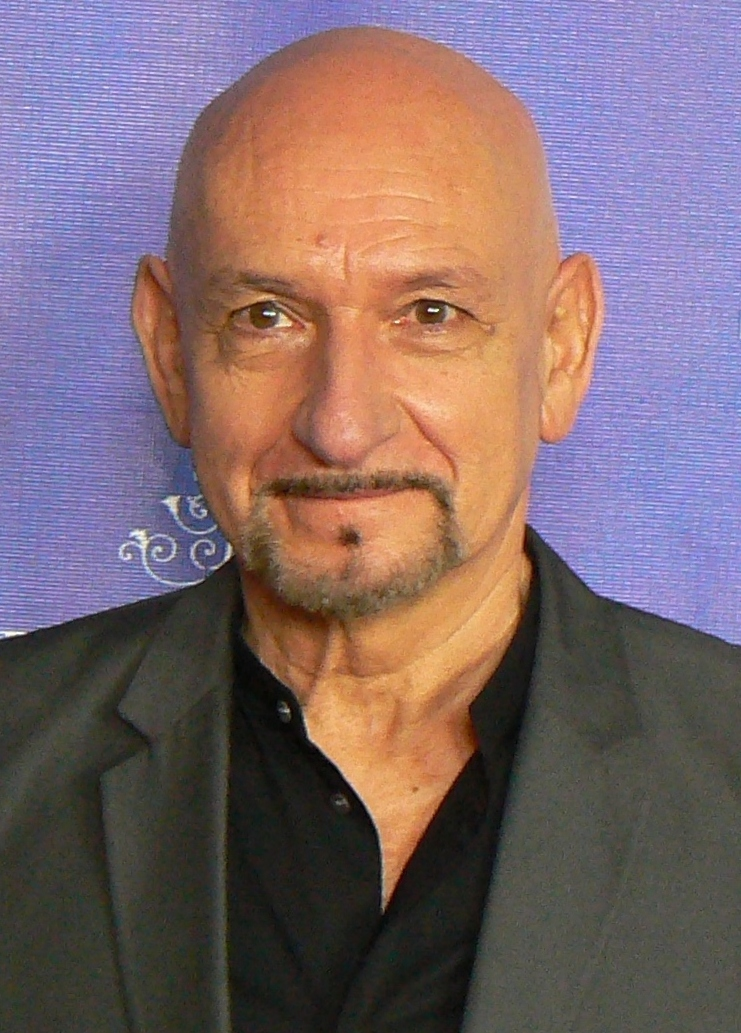
Kingsley at the Santa Barbara International Film Festival (2012)

In 2013, Kingsley appeared as the villain Trevor Slattery in the Marvel Cinematic Universe film Iron Man 3 with Robert Downey Jr., and as the hero Mazer Rackham in the science-fiction action adventure film Ender's Game with Harrison Ford and Asa Butterfield. A year later he played the Hebrew slave Nun in Ridley Scott's Exodus: Gods and Kings and Merenkahre, a simulacrum of an Egyptian pharaoh and father of Ahkmenrah, in Shawn Levy's Night at the Museum: Secret of the Tomb with Ben Stiller, Robin Williams, Owen Wilson, Rami Malek and Dan Stevens. That same year, Kingsley would also reprise his role as Slattery in the direct-to-video short film All Hail the King.

In 2015, Kingsley portrayed a Sikh driving instructor in the film Learning to Drive. He voiced Bagheera in the live-action adaptation of Jon Favreau's The Jungle Book (2016), a remake of the original 1967 film shared cast with Bill Murray, Idris Elba, Lupita Nyong'o, Scarlett Johansson and Christopher Walken. Kingsley also recorded Yogananda's Autobiography of a Yogi in book-on-tape format. In 2018, he narrated Amazon Prime's documentary All or Nothing: Manchester City which followed Manchester City's record breaking 2017–18 Premier League campaign. and served as the voice of General Woundwort in the BBC adaptation of Watership Down.

In 2021, Kingsley reprised his role as Trevor Slattery in the film Shang-Chi and the Legend of the Ten Rings. Two years later, he also acted in Wes Anderson's The Wonderful Story of Henry Sugar, a film adaptation of a short story by Roald Dahl, and starred opposite Ralph Fiennes, Dev Patel and Benedict Cumberbatch. This film went on to win the Academy Award for Best Live Action Short Film. In 2025, Kingsley played Ibrahim Arif in a film adaptation of Richard Osman's multi-award-winning Thursday Murder Club series in an undisclosed role alongside Helen Mirren, Pierce Brosnan, Celia Imrie and Jonathan Pryce .

Kingsley reprised his role of Trevor Slattery in Wonder Man, released on 27 January 2026. He next starred as Robert Dinwiddie in Young Washington, Terrence Malick's epic biblical drama The Way of the Wind, Renny Harlin's disaster horror film Deep Water, Simon West's historical spy action-adventure film Fortitude, and the action-adventure film Sonic the Hedgehog 4.

== Personal life ==
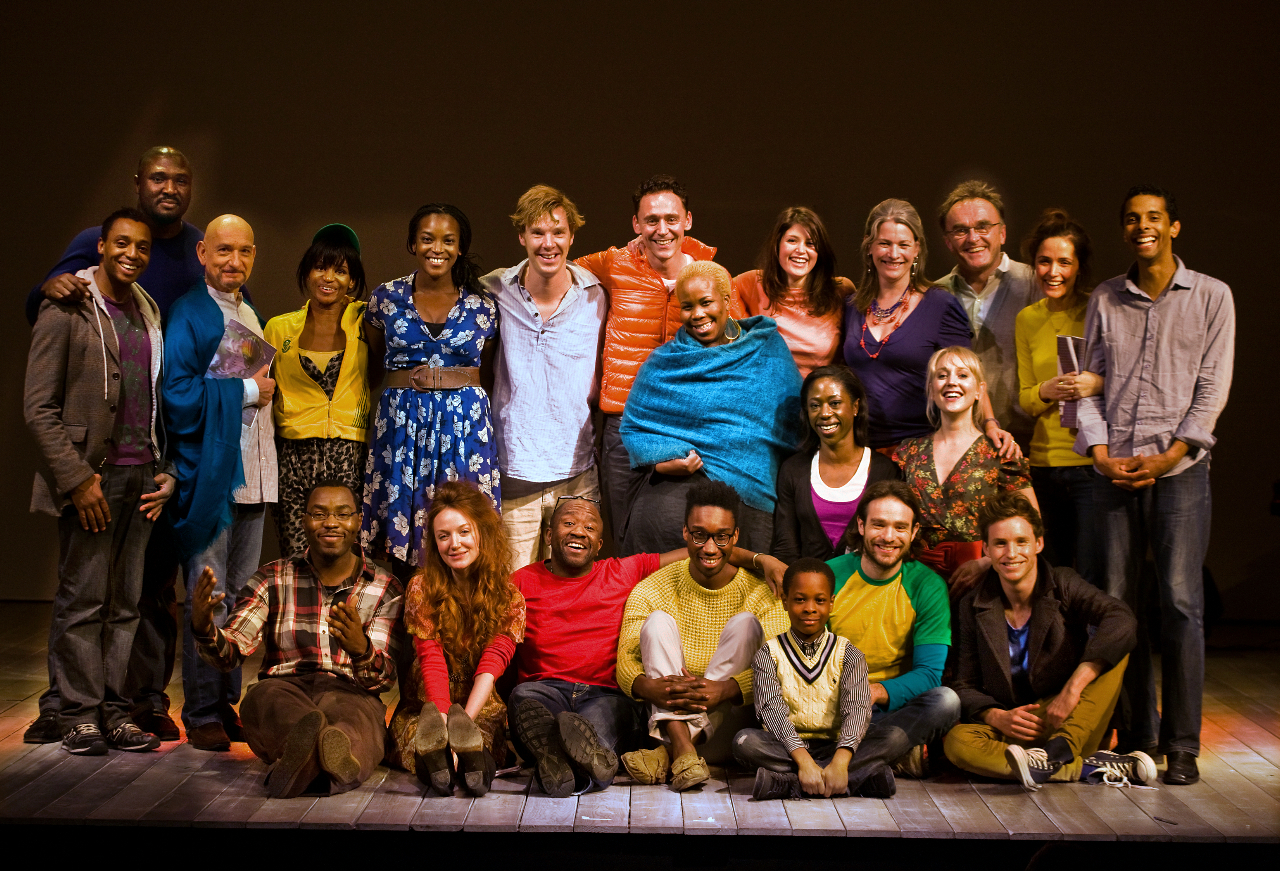
Kingsley (third left) and the cast of The Children's Monologues at the Old Vic Theatre (2010)

=== Marriage and family ===
Kingsley has been married four times and has four children: two with his first wife, actress Angela Morant, and two (including actor Ferdinand Kingsley), with his second wife, theatrical director Alison Sutcliffe. He divorced his third wife Alexandra Christmann in 2005, having been "deeply, deeply shocked" after pictures of her kissing another man surfaced on the internet. They lived in Spelsbury, Oxfordshire. On 3 September 2007, Kingsley married Brazilian actress Daniela Lavender at Eynsham Hall in North Leigh.

=== Charity ===
Kingsley appeared in a production of The Children's Monologues in 2010 on stage in London alongside Benedict Cumberbatch, Tom Hiddleston, Gemma Arterton, and Eddie Redmayne. It was performed on behalf of Dramatic Need, a charity that sends international arts professionals (such as musicians, artists, and actors) to host workshops in underprivileged and rural communities in Africa.

== Acting credits and accolades ==
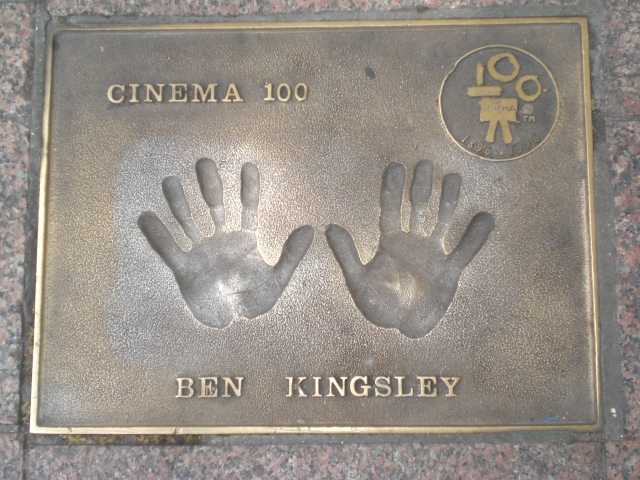
Kingsley's handprints at Leicester Square, London

Kingsley won an Academy Award in the Best Actor category for Gandhi, and has been nominated three more times: Best Supporting Actor for Bugsy and Sexy Beast, and Best Actor for House of Sand and Fog (2003). In 1984, Kingsley won a Grammy Award for Best Spoken Word or Nonmusical Recording for The Words of Gandhi. In the same year, he also received an honorary degree from the University of Salford, and was awarded the Indian civilian honour Padma Shri. He was knighted by Queen Elizabeth II in the 2002 New Year Honours for services to drama. The award was announced on 31 December 2001, which happened to be Kingsley's 58th birthday. After receiving the accolade at Buckingham Palace, Kingsley stated:

I told the Queen that winning an Oscar pales into insignificance—this is insurmountable. I'm fascinated by the ancient, by mythology, by these islands and their tradition of story telling. I feel that I am a story teller and to receive a knighthood is really recognition of that.

His demand to be called 'Sir' in film and TV show credits was documented by the BBC, to some criticism. Co-star Penélope Cruz was reportedly unsure what to call him during the filming of Elegy as someone had told her she needed to refer to him as "Sir Ben". One day it slipped out as such, and she called him that for the remainder of the shoot. Kingsley has denied accusations that he prefers to be referred to by his title, saying, "If I've ever insisted on being called 'Sir' by colleagues on a film set then I am profoundly sorry. I don't remember ever doing that and I tend not to forget."

In 2008, Kingsley awarded an Honorary Doctorate of Letters by the University of Hull. In May 2010, he received a star on the Hollywood Walk of Fame and in April 2013 he was honoured with the Fellowship Award at The Asian Awards in London.

In 2024, Kingsley was awarded the honorary degree of Doctor of the University by the University of Buckingham.

== See also ==
- List of Academy Award winners and nominees from Great Britain
- List of actors in Royal Shakespeare Company productions
- List of actors with Academy Award nominations
- List of actors with Hollywood Walk of Fame motion picture stars
- List of actors with more than one Academy Award nomination in the acting categories
- List of British actors
- List of Golden Globe winners
