= Get Ready =

Get Ready may refer to:

== Music ==
=== Albums ===
- Get Ready!, a 1992 album by 2 Unlimited
- Get Ready! (Roachford album), 1991
- Get Ready (Human Nature album), 2007
- Get Ready (Kleeer album), 1982
- Get Ready (New Order album), 2001
- Get Ready (Rare Earth album), 1969
- Get Ready (Tomomi Itano album), 2016
- Get Ready (Virtue album), 1999
- Get Ready!, an EP by Little Red, 2008

=== Songs ===
- "Get Ready" (Temptations song), 1966, also covered by Rare Earth in 1970
- "Get Ready" (Mase song), 1999
- "Get Ready" (Shawn Desman song), 2002
- "Get Ready" (Pitbull song), 2020
- "Get Ready", single from Get Ready! (Roachford album), 1991
- "Get Ready", a song by Sublime from Sublime
- "Get Ready", a song by Bon Jovi from Bon Jovi
- "Get Ready", a song by Accept from Restless and Wild
- "Get Ready", a 1959 song by Larry Williams
- "Get Ready", a 1974 song by Eric Clapton and Yvonne Elliman from 461 Ocean Boulevard
- "Get Ready", a 2018 song by Black Eyed Peas from Masters of the Sun Vol. 1

== See also ==
- Get Ready!, a 2023 Japanese television series starring Satoshi Tsumabuki
- Get Ready for CBS, an image campaign for the American television network CBS
