= Only to Be with You =

1994 single by Roachford

Single by Roachford

from the album Permanent Shade of Blue
- B-side: "Funky Affair"; "Shoot It from the Heart"; "Kathleen"; "Nobody but You"
- Released: 7 March 1994
- Genre: Rock; soul
- Length: 4:20
- Label: Columbia
- Songwriter: Andrew Roachford
- Producers: Martyn Phillips; Roachford

Roachford singles chronology
"Higher" (1991)	"Only to Be with You" (1994)	"Lay Your Love on Me" (1994)

Audio
- "Only to Be with You" on YouTube

"Only to Be with You" is a song by English band Roachford, written by frontman Andrew Roachford and produced by the band and Martyn Phillips. It was released on 7 March 1994 by Columbia Records as the lead single from the band's third studio album, Permanent Shade of Blue (1994), and as their first single as a quartet. Backed with a strong promotional campaign in the United Kingdom, the song reached number 21 on the UK Singles Chart to become Roachford's fourth top-40 hit. It also charted worldwide, reaching the top 40 in Australia (where it is the band's highest-charting single), Iceland, and New Zealand.

== Background and release ==
Doe Phillips, the marketing manager of Columbia UK, believed that Roachford's limited commercial success was related to improper communication of the band's image. To rectify this, the band was scaled down from a six-piece to a quartet for Permanent Shade of Blue, but Phillips was careful not to let Andrew Roachford overshadow the other three members. "Only to Be with You" was included as the opening track on Permanent Shade of Blue, which was released in the United Kingdom on 5 April 1994. The song was issued as the album's lead single there on 7 March 1994 across three formats: a CD, a cassette, and a limited-edition 7-inch vinyl. In Australia, the song was released on CD and cassette a month later, on 4 April.

== Critical reception ==
Radio Forth head of music Colin Sommerville compared Andrew Roachford's vocals on "Only to Be with You" to those of Thin Lizzy lead vocalist Phil Lynott, calling the track a "great radio song". Music & Media magazine also compared Roachford's vocals to Lynott's, stating that it is a superior rock-soul song. In his weekly UK chart commentary, James Masterton referred to the single as "classy".

== Chart performance ==
In the United Kingdom, "Only to Be with You" debuted at number 41 on the UK Singles Chart on the week beginning 13 March 1994. Over the next few weeks, Roachford appeared on many television programmes to promote the single. This exposure allowed it to ascend to number 21 on the UK chart three weeks after its debut, becoming Roachford's fourth top-40 hit there. Until "The Way I Feel" reached number 20 in 1997, it was the band's second-highest-charting single, behind "Cuddly Toy", and as of 2026, it is their third-longest-charting hit, staying in the top 100 for seven weeks. Its UK sales alone registered on the Eurochart Hot 100, where it peaked at number 58 on 9 April 1994.

In Europe, "Only to Be with You" charted in Germany, Iceland, and the Netherlands. It first charted in Iceland, where it debuted and peaked at number 28 on the Íslenski Listinn Topp 40 on 14 April 1994. In Germany, the single first charted on 25 April 1999 and reached number 57 two weeks later, spending 13 weeks in the top 100. On the Netherlands' Single Top 100 ranking, the track entered at number 45 on 7 May 1994 and spent the next two weeks at its peak of number 44 before leaving the top 100. The song also charted in Australia and New Zealand, reaching number 18 in the former nation and number 24 in the latter; in Australia, it is the band's highest-charting single.

== Music video ==
The accompanying music video for "Only to Be with You" was directed by Barry McGuire and produced by Gareth Francis for Oil Factory. It was released on 21 March 1994 and features a stylised black-and-white studio-based performance with touches of colour.

== Track listings ==
- UK CD1; Australian CD and cassette single
1. "Only to Be with You"
2. "Only to Be with You" (long version)
3. "Funky Affair"
4. "Shoot It from the Heart"
- UK CD2
1. "Only to Be with You"
2. "Kathleen"
3. "Nobody but You"
4. "Innocent Eyes"
- UK 7-inch single and European CD single
1. "Only to Be with You"
2. "Funky Affair"

== Personnel ==
Personnel are lifted from the Permanent Shade of Blue album booklet.

- Roachford – production
  - Andrew Roachford – writing, vocals, keyboards, percussion
  - Hawi Gondwe – guitar
  - Derrick Taylor – bass
  - Chris Taylor – drums
- Gus Isidore – additional guitar
- Eric Robinson – Hammond
- Martyn Phillips – additional keyboards, production, engineering
- Graham Carr – keyboard programming, funky breaks
- Tim Palmer – additional production, mixing
- Steve Chase – recording (drums)
- Mark O'Donoughue – mixing engineer
- Yan Memmi – additional engineering

== Charts ==
=== Weekly charts ===
Chart (1994)	Peak position
Australia (ARIA)	18
Europe (Eurochart Hot 100)	58
Europe (European Hit Radio)	9
Germany (GfK)	57
Iceland (Íslenski Listinn Topp 40)	28
Netherlands (Dutch Top 40)	17
Netherlands (Single Top 100)	44
New Zealand (Recorded Music NZ)	24
Scotland Singles (OCC)	16
UK Singles (OCC)	21
UK Airplay (Music Week)	3

=== Year-end charts ===
Chart (1994)	Position
UK Singles (OCC)	142
UK Airplay (Music Week)	50
