= Naked Without You =

Naked Without You may refer to:

- "Naked Without You" (song), a 1999 song by Taylor Dayne
- Naked Without You (album), a 1998 album by Taylor Dayne
