= Swag (Tomomi Itano album) =

SxWxAxG
- Regular edition cover

Studio album by Tomomi Itano
- Released: July 2, 2014
- Genre: J-pop, dance
- Length: 59:42
- Label: King

Tomomi Itano chronology
SxWxAxG (2014)	Get Ready (2016)

Singles from S×W×A×G
- 1. "Dear J" Released: January 26, 2011; 2. "Wanna Be Now" Released: May 11, 2011; 3. "Ai ni Pierce" Released: June 1, 2011; 4. "Fui ni" Released: July 13, 2011; 5. "10nen Go no Kimi e" Released: April 25, 2012; 6. "1%" Released: June 12, 2013; 7. "Little" Released: February 5, 2014

Swag (stylized as S×W×A×G) is the debut album by Japanese singer-songwriter Tomomi Itano. It was released in Japan on the label King Records on July 2, 2014.

The album was released in three versions: the Limited Edition, the Regular Edition and the Samantha Vega Edition (the latter is released in collaboration with the accessory line Samantha Vega).

It included title tracks from all five of Tomomi Itano's CD singles (from the debut single "Dear J" to the fifth single "Little"), two limited-distribution digital singles ("Wanna Be Now" and "Ai ni Pierce"), and four new songs. S×W×A×G is an acronym for “Sexy, Wonder, Attitude, Give”.

== Track listing ==
=== Limited and regular editions ===
CD
No.	Title	Lyrics	Music	{{{extra_column}}}	Length
1.	"Dear J"	Yasushi Akimoto	Keyz, Carlos K.	corin.	3:39
2.	"1%"	Yasushi Akimoto	江上浩太郎	Mitsu.J	4:08
3.	"Wanna Be Now" (Wanna be now)	Yasushi Akimoto	重永亮介	重永亮介	3:45
4.	"Ai ni Pierce" (愛にピアス)	Yasushi Akimoto	黒須克彦	黒須克彦	4:00
5.	"Clone"	Yasushi Akimoto	西隆彰	Mitsu.J	3:53
6.	"Fui ni" (ふいに)	Yasushi Akimoto	渡辺泰司	渡辺泰司	4:32
7.	"For You, For Me" (For you, For me)	Yasushi Akimoto	Carlos K.	Carlos K.	4:19
8.	"10nen Go no Kimi e" (10年後の君へ)	Yasushi Akimoto	杉山勝彦	中野雄太	4:03
9.	"Lose-Lose" (lose-lose)	Tomomi Itano	SHOW	SHOW	4:42
10.	"Little"	Tomomi Itano	MUSOH, S1CKONE	S1CKONE	4:38
11.	"Girls Do"	Tomomi Itano	SMIDI, Jasmine Anderson	SMIDI	3:27
12.	"Swaggalicious" (SWAGGALICIOUS)				3:48
13.	"Bow Wow" (BOW WOW)				3:45
14.	"Jan-paran!!" (JAN-PARAN!!)				3:27
15.	"Crush"				3:50
Total length:					59:42

Limited edition DVD
No.	Title	Length
1.	"Crush" (music video)
2.	"Crush" (making of)

=== Samantha Vega edition ===
No.	Title	Length
1.	"Dear J"	3:39
2.	"1%"	4:08
3.	"Ai ni Pierce"	4:00
4.	"Fui ni"	4:32
5.	"For You, For Me"	4:19
6.	"10nen Go no Kimi e"	4:03
7.	"Girls Do"	3:27
8.	"Swagalicious"	3:48
9.	"Jan-paran!!"	3:27
10.	"Crush"	3:30

== Charts ==
Chart (2014)	Peak position
Japan (Oricon Weekly Albums Chart)	6
