= Dear J (song) =

Single by Tomomi Itano

from the album Swag
- Released: January 26, 2011
- Genre: J-pop, Dance-pop
- Length: 3:39
- Label: King Records
- Songwriter(s): Yasushi Akimoto, Keyz, Carlos K
- Producer(s): corin

Tomomi Itano singles chronology
| "Dear J" (2011) | "Fui ni" (2011) |

Music video
- "Dear J" on YouTube

Professional ratings
Review scores
| Source | Rating |
|---|---|
| Hotexpress | Favorable |

"Dear J" is the debut solo single released by then-AKB48 member Tomomi Itano. It was released in four versions: three regular CD+DVD editions and a limited theater CD-only edition. The first pressings of the regular editions came with a photo and an application card for tickets to a debut commemoration event, while all theater editions came with a handshake event ticket and a photo. The title track was used as a Samantha Thavasa TV commercial song. The second track of the theater edition, "Tsundere!", is from Team A's 5th stage. The original was sung by Itano, Rie Kitahara, and Amina Sato, while the "Dear J" version was sung by Itano and the members of the AKB48 unit Natto Angels Z. Itano was a member of its original unit, Natto Angels. The single reached number 2 on the Oricon weekly charts and charted for 24 weeks.

== Track listing ==
Type-A DVD track list

1. "Dear J" -music clip-
2. Tomomi Itano collection -special movie-

Type-B CD track list

1. "Dear J"
2. "Stay By My Side"
3. "Dear J" -off vocal ver.-
4. "Stay By My Side" -off vocal ver.-

Type-B DVD track list

1. "Dear J" -music clip-
2. Tomomi Itano interview -special movie-

Type-C CD track list

1. "Dear J"
2. "Thank You"
3. "Dear J" -off vocal ver.-
4. "Thank You" -off vocal ver.-

Type-C DVD track list

1. "Dear J" -music clip-
2. Making of Tomomi Itano -special movie-

Theater edition CD track list

1. "Dear J"
2. "Tsundere!" (Tomomi Itano, Haruka Ishida, Sumire Sato, Moeno Nito, Miho Miyazaki) (AKB48 cover)
3. "Dear J" -off vocal ver.-
4. "Tsundere!" -off vocal ver.-

== Charts ==
Oricon Sales Chart (Japan)

| Release | Chart | Peak position | First week sales | Sales total | Chart run |
|---|---|---|---|---|---|
| 26 January 2011 | Oricon Daily Singles Chart | 2 | | | |
| 26 January 2011 | Oricon Weekly Singles Chart | 2 | 162,671 | 216,423 | 24 |

- The single sold 162,871 copies on the first week of release, and the total reported sales in total of all the weeks were 216,423 sales.
