= Richie Lamontagne =

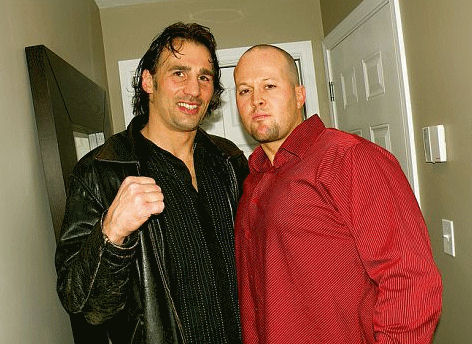
- Richie Lamontagne & John Quinlan

Personal information
- Nickname: "The Mountain"
- Born: Richard Lamontagne; December 20, 1969 (age 56) Everett, Massachusetts, U.S.
- Height: 6 ft 3 in (1.91 m)
- Weight: Cruiserweight

Boxing career
- Stance: Orthodox

Boxing record
- Total fights: 37
- Wins: 29
- Win by KO: 24
- Losses: 7
- Draws: 1
- No contests: 0

Richie Lamontagne, known as "The Mountain", born in Everett, Massachusetts, December 20, 1969, is a professional American boxer. Lamontagne's record is 29-7-1 with 24 knockouts. He is also an actor and model. He was U.S.B.F. Cruiserweight Champion, a title won in 1995 with a 9th-round knock out against Fred Adams of Clearwater, Florida. He defended his title six times, all by knockouts, then received a 12-round split decision loss to Kenny Keene in his home town of Boise, Idaho in 1998. In May 1998, after his loss in Biloxi, Mississippi, to the 1996 Olympic Gold Medalist, Vasily Jirov of Russia, his recognition in the world of boxing and his marketability increased. He appeared on television programs: E.T., Inside Edition, Hard Copy, and Extra. He also appeared in a number of feature films including: A Civil Action, Urban Relics, Moon over Miami, and appeared alongside Robert De Niro as Carmine in the 1999 film Flawless. He was featured in (G.Q.)Gentlemen's Quarterly Magazine with an 8-page spread in July 1998. Lamontagne has also done ad campaigns for Versace, Calvin Klien, Joe Boxer and Everlast, and appeared in advertisements for Reebok, Naturalizer Shoes, and Naked Fish. Lamontagne was a spokesman for MacPherson Men, an underwear/lingerie maker, for one year.

== Professional boxing record ==
29 Wins (24 knockouts, 5 decisions, 0 disqualifications), 7 Losses, 1 Draw, 0 No Contests
Res.	Record	Opponent	Type	Rd., Time	Date	Location	Notes
Loss	29-7-1	(United Kingdom) Enzo Maccarinelli	TKO	4 (12), 1:04	2005-01-21	Bridgend, Wales, UK	World Boxing Union Cruiserweight Title
Win	29-6-1	(United States) Allen Smith	TKO	1 (10)	2004-10-08	(Iowa) Creston, IA	
Loss	28-6-1	(United States) Chris Thomas	TKO	2 (10), 2:30	2003-02-22	(Illinois) Elk Grove Village, IL	
Loss	28-5-1	(Canada) Dale Brown	Decision (unanimous)	10	2003-08-01	(New Hampshire) Hampton Beach, NH	
Win	28-4-1	(United States) Ernest M-16 Mateen	TKO	6 (10)	2003-05-02	(Connecticut) Mashantucket, CT	Corner retirement.
Win	27-4-1	(United States) Michael Bennett	KO	11 (12)	2002-08-02	(Connecticut) Mashantucket, CT	Vacant IBA America's Super Cruiserweight Title
Win	26-4-1	(United States) Art Jimmerson	TKO	1 (10)	2002-06-28	(Massachusetts) Boston, MA	Vacant EBA Cruiserweight Title
Win	25-4-1	(Puerto Rico) Wilfredo Muniz	TKO	2 (10), 1:05	2002-03-22	(Massachusetts) Boston, MA	
Win	24-4-1	(United States) Dan Sheehan	Decision (unanimous)	6	2002-01-25	(Massachusetts) Boston, MA	
Win	23-4-1	(United States) James Sealey	KO	1	2001-11-10	(Georgia (country)) Savannah, GA	
Loss	22-4-1	(United States) Gary Wilcox	Decision (points)	8	2000-07-14	(New Hampshire) Hampton Beach, NH	
Win	22-3-1	(United States) Brian Hollins	TKO	6 (6)	2000-04-01	(Massachusetts) Boston, MA	
Win	21-3-1	(Guyana) Pascal David	TKO	5	1999-09-30	(Rhode Island) Cranston, RI	
Win	20-3-1	(United States) Calvin Smith	TKO	3 (8)	1999-02-26	(Connecticut) Mashantucket, CT	
Loss	19-3-1	(United States) Sajad Abdul Aziz	Decision (unanimous)	8	1998-09-25	(Connecticut) Mashantucket, CT	
Loss	19-2-1	(Kazakhstan) Vassiliy Jirov	Decision (unanimous)	12	1998-05-05	(Nevada) Biloxi, MS	Vacant WBC International Cruiserweight Title
Loss	19-1	(United States) Kenny Keene	Decision (unanimous)	12	1998-01-16	(Idaho) Boise, ID	IBA Continental Cruiserweight Title
Win	19-0	(United States) Art Bayliss	Decision (points)	8	1997-12-05	(Massachusetts) Boston, MA	
Win	18-0	(United States) Doug Davis	TKO	6	1997-08-08	(Massachusetts) Boston, MA	
Win	17-0	(United States) Andre Sherrod	KO	1	1997-06-28	(Massachusetts) Boston, MA	
Win	16-0	(United States) Domingo Monroe	TKO	8 (10)	1996-06-06	(Massachusetts) Boston, MA	
Win	15-0	(United States) Jose Hiram Torres	TKO	5	1995-11-25	(Massachusetts) Stoughton, MA	
Win	14-0	(United States) Fred Adams	KO	9 (12)	1995-08-24	(Massachusetts) Somerville, MA	USBF Cruiserweight Title
Win	13-0	(United States) Jose Hiram Torres	TKO	1	1995-06-27	(Massachusetts) Boston, MA	
Win	12-0	(Afghanistan) Tony Habibzai	KO	1 (6)	1995-04-22	(Massachusetts) Boston, MA	
Win	11-0	(United States) Mike Soto	KO	1	1995-03-14	(Massachusetts) Boston, MA	
Win	10-0	(United States) Ted Fencher	KO	1	1995-01-28	(Massachusetts) Boston, MA	
Win	9-0	(United States) Willie Kemp	TKO	5	1994-12-14	(Massachusetts) Boston, MA	
Win	8-0	(United States) Willie Kemp	Decision (points)	6	1994-09-17	(Massachusetts) Revere, MA	
Draw	7-0	(United States) Ron Preston	Decision (points)	6	1994-08-11	(Massachusetts) Malden, MA	
Win	6-0	(United States) Danny Chapman	KO	1	1994-06-21	(Massachusetts) Boston, MA	
Win	5-0	(United States) Ed Kelly	TKO	1	1994-03-15	(Massachusetts) Boston, MA	
Win	4-0	(United States) Jason Nicholson	Decision (points)	4	1994-01-23	(Massachusetts) Boston, MA	
Win	3-0	(Canada) Gary McIntyre	Decision (unanimous)	4	1993-12-03	(New Hampshire) Salem, NH	
Win	2-0	(United States) Wayne Foster	KO	1	1993-11-06	(Massachusetts) Revere, MA	
Win	1-0	(United States) Muhammad Askai	KO	1 (4)	1993-10-13	(Massachusetts) Boston, MA	
Win	0-0	(United States) Wilbert Miranda	KO	1	1993-09-10	(Massachusetts) Revere, MA	

== Boxing championships and accomplishments ==
Titles

- USBF Cruiserweight Title 1995
- EBA Cruiserweight Title 2002
- IBA America's Super Cruiserweight Title 2002
