= Andrew Roachford =

British singer-songwriter (born 1965)

Andrew Roachford MBE
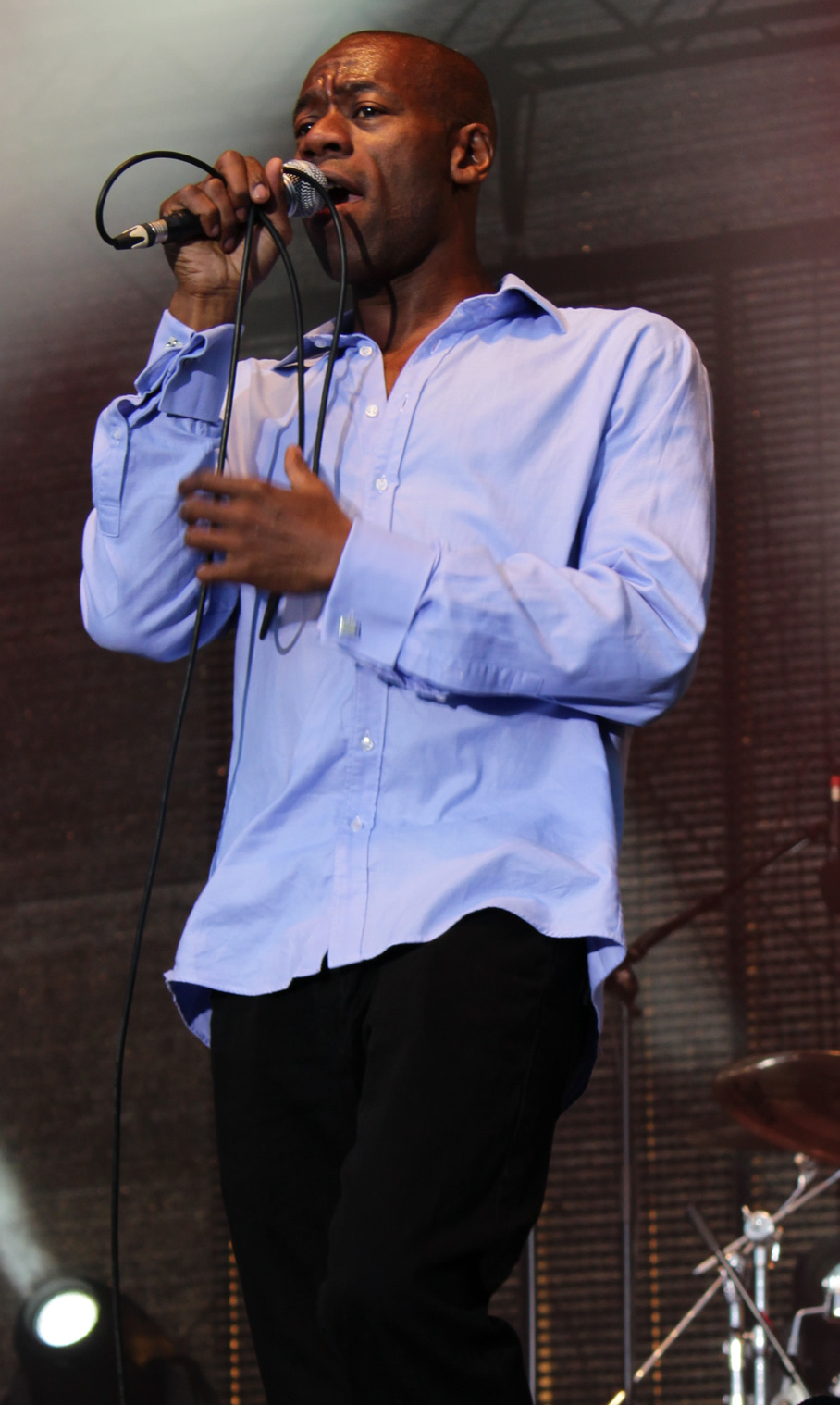
- Roachford performing with Mike + The Mechanics in 2011

Background information
- Born: 22 January 1965 (age 61); London, England
- Genres: Pop rock; R&B; soul
- Occupations: Musician; singer; songwriter
- Instruments: Vocals; keyboards; percussion
- Years active: 1987–present
- Labels: Columbia; Absolute; Peppermint Jam; SPV; M3; Sony BMG
- Member of: Roachford; Mike + The Mechanics
- Website: roachford.co.uk

Andrew Roachford (born 22 January 1965) is an English singer-songwriter and the main force behind the band Roachford, who scored their first success in 1989 with the hits "Cuddly Toy" and "Family Man". He has also had a successful solo career.

He was appointed Member of the Order of the British Empire (MBE) in the 2019 Birthday Honours for services to music.

== Early life and career ==
Andrew Roachford was born on 22 January 1965 in London, England to parents from Barbados. A band of the same name was formed in 1987, the line-up featuring Roachford (vocals, keyboards, percussion), Chris Taylor (drums), Hawi Gondwe (guitars) and Derrick Taylor (bass guitar). By 1988, the band were touring, supporting acts such as Terence Trent D'Arby and the Christians. Shortly afterward, a seven-album recording contract with Columbia was signed. They went on to have a string of success throughout the 1990s, becoming Columbia's biggest-selling UK act for ten years.

Roachford released his first solo studio album, Heart of the Matter, in 2003. His next studio album Word of Mouth was released in June 2005 under the band name Roachford. In 2010, Roachford joined Mike + The Mechanics along with Tim Howar. The following year the band's seventh studio album The Road was released featuring Roachford and Howar as lead vocalists, as well as their eighth studio album Let Me Fly (2017).

Roachford collaborated with Beverley Knight on his studio album Twice In a Lifetime, which was released in September 2020. It charted at number 31 on the UK Albums Chart. This was the first Roachford album to chart in the top 40 after a 23-year absence, last charting in 1997 with Feel.

== Discography ==
=== Albums ===
Title	Album details	Peak chart positions								Certification
Title	Album details	UK	AUS	AUT	GER	NZ	SWE	SWI	US	Certification
Roachford	Released: 9 September 1988; Label: CBS	11	—	—	—	—	48	—	109	BPI: Gold
Get Ready!	Released: 1991; Label: Columbia	20	176	—	36	—	49	—	—	
Permanent Shade of Blue	Released: 30 March 1994; Label: Columbia	25	2	—	52	11	—	—	—	ARIA: 2× Platinum; BPI: Gold
Feel	Released: 29 September 1997; Label: Columbia	19	61	47	37	—	—	50	—	
The Roachford Files (compilation)	Released: 9 October 2000; Label: Columbia	88	—	—	—	—	—	100	—	
Heart of the Matter	Released: 4 August 2003; Label: Absolute; Released under the artist name Andrew Roachford	—	—	—	—	—	—	—	—	
Word of Mouth	Released: 27 June 2005; Label: Peppermint Jam/SPV	—	—	—	88	—	—	—	—	
Where I Stand	Released: 10 April 2011; Label: M3 Records	—	—	—	—	—	—	—	—	
Addictive	Released: September 2011; Label: M3 Records	—	—	—	—	—	—	—	—	
This Beautiful Moment	Released: 2013; Label: M3 Records	—	—	—	—	—	—	—	—	
Encore	Released: 2016; Label: M3 Records	—	—	—	—	—	—	—	—	
Twice in a Lifetime	Released: 11 September 2020; Label: Sony BMG	31	—	—	68	—	—	72	—	
Then and Now	Released: 8 December 2023; Label: Sony BMG	—	—	—	—	—	—	—	—	
"—" denotes releases that did not chart.

=== Singles ===
Year	Title	Peak chart positions										Album
Year	Title	UK	AUS	AUT	FRA	GER	IRE	NED	NZ	SWI	US	Album
1988	"Family Man"	—	—	—	—	—	—	—	—	—	—	Roachford
1988	"Cuddly Toy"	61	73	—	—	—	—	—	—	—	—	Roachford
1988	"Find Me Another Love"	100	—	—	—	—	—	—	—	—	—	Roachford
1989	"Cuddly Toy" (re-release)	4	—	—	—	49	7	17	—	—	25	Roachford
1989	"Family Man" (re-release)	25	157	—	—	—	18	—	—	—	—	Roachford
1989	"Kathleen"	43	—	—	—	—	—	—	—	—	—	Roachford
1991	"Get Ready!"	22	—	—	35	43	—	—	—	—	—	Get Ready!
1991	"Stone City"	77	—	—	—	—	—	58	—	—	—	Get Ready!
1991	"Innocent Eyes"	91	—	—	—	—	—	—	—	—	—	Get Ready!
1991	"Higher"	—	—	—	—	—	—	—	—	—	—	Get Ready!
1994	"Only to Be with You"	21	18	—	—	57	—	44	24	—	—	Permanent Shade of Blue
1994	"Lay Your Love on Me"	36	26	—	—	55	—	—	7	—	—	Permanent Shade of Blue
1994	"This Generation"	38	53	—	—	60	—	—	32	—	—	Permanent Shade of Blue
1994	"Cry for Me"	46	103	—	—	—	—	—	—	—	—	Permanent Shade of Blue
1995	"I Know You Don't Love Me"	42	103	—	—	—	—	—	—	—	—	Permanent Shade of Blue
1997	"The Way I Feel"	20	105	—	—	91	—	—	—	46	—	Feel
1998	"How Could I? (Insecurity)"	34	198	—	—	—	—	—	—	—	—	Feel
1998	"Naked Without You"	53	—	—	—	—	—	71	—	—	—	Feel
1998	"Ain't No Stoppin' Us Now" (MOBO Allstars)^{+}	47	—	—	—	—	—	—	—	—	—	Non-album singles
1999	"Walk Away" (PF Project featuring Roachford)	—	—	—	—	—	—	—	—	—	—	Non-album singles
2000	"From Now On"	90	—	—	—	—	—	—	—	—	—	The Roachford Files
2001	"Run Baby Run" (Bustafunk featuring Roachford)	—	—	—	11	—	—	—	—	60	—	Bustafunk (Bustafunk album)
2003	"The Pressure"	—	—	—	—	—	—	—	—	—	—	Heart of the Matter
2004	"Pop Muzak" (Mousse T. with Roachford)	—	—	14	—	19	—	—	—	73	—	Word of Mouth
2005	"River of Love"	—	—	—	—	—	—	85	—	—	—	Word of Mouth
2005	"Tomorrow"	—	—	—	—	—	—	—	—	—	—	Word of Mouth
2007	"Ride the Storm" (Roachford & M.Y.N.C. Project)	—	—	—	—	—	—	—	—	—	—	Non-album singles
2007	"Ride the Storm" (Remix) (Carl Kennedy vs. M.Y.N.C Project featuring Roachford)	—	—	—	—	—	—	—	—	—	—	Non-album singles
2010	"Survive" (Laurent Wolf featuring Andrew Roachford)	—	—	—	9	—	—	—	—	—	—	Harmony (Laurent Wolf album)
2011	"Wishing You Knew"	—	—	—	—	—	—	—	—	—	—	Addictive
2011	"Complicated"	—	—	—	—	—	—	—	—	—	—	Addictive
2019	"Love Remedy"	—	—	—	—	—	—	—	—	—	—	Twice in a Lifetime
2020	"What We Had" (featuring Beverley Knight)	—	—	—	—	—	—	—	—	—	—	Twice in a Lifetime
"—" denotes releases that did not chart.

- ^{+} "Ain't No Stoppin' Us Now" by MOBO Allstars was a charity single released collectively by MOBO Award nominees in 1998, reaching No. 47 on the UK Singles Chart. The artists featured on the recording were Another Level, Beverley Knight, Mica Paris, Damage, Nine Yards, Don-E, Hinda Hicks, Celetia, Dina Carroll, Dru Hill, Shola Ama, Truce, Misty Oldland, Ultimate Kaos, Kleshay, Lynden David Hall, Kele Le Roc, East 17, Conner Reeves, Des'ree, Cleopatra, Glamma Kid, Honeyz, Kelle Bryan, Roachford, Byron Stingily, Alyson Brown, D'Influence, Michelle Gayle, Ignorants, Soundproof, Tony Dortie, David Grant and Carrie Grant.
