= How Many =

Single by Taylor Dayne

from the album Circuit soundtrack
- Released: 2002
- Recorded: 2001
- Genre: Dance-pop
- Length: 4:07
- Label: Centaur Entertainment
- Songwriters: Tony Moran; Warren Rigg; Harriet Roberts
- Producer: Tony Moran

Taylor Dayne singles chronology
"Planet Love" (1999)	"How Many" (2002)	"Beautiful" (2007)

"How Many" is the lead single from the motion picture soundtrack for the film Circuit. It was released on December 3, 2002, and was Taylor Dayne's last single for five years, until the 2007 release of "Beautiful".

== Charts ==
The song peaked at No. 6 on the Billboard Hot Dance Music/Club Play chart.

== CD maxi single track listing ==
Disc 1

1. "How Many" (original version)
2. "How Many" (Big Bang Radio Edit)
3. "How Many" (Guido Osorio Club Mix)
4. "How Many" (Lifestylus Deep and Heavy)
5. "How Many" (Fiburn and Urik Club Mix)
6. "How Many" (Menergy's Sound Factory Vox Dub)
7. "How Many" (Guido Osorio Dub)
8. "How Many" (Friburn and Urik Dub)
9. "How Many" (Lifestylus Dub)
10. "How Many" (K-Pable Mix)

Disc 2

1. "How Many" (Vibelicious Radio Edit)
2. "How Many" (DJ Manolo and Gene Therapy Mix)
3. "How Many" (Big Bang Mix)
4. "How Many" (Bet Boyz Vocal Dub)
5. "How Many" (Dj's Inc. Mix)
6. "How Many" (Nocturnal Minds Mix)
7. "How Many" (Vibelicious Anthem Mix)
8. "How Many" (Wes Wallace Dub)
9. "How Many" (Eddie X and Spiritual Being Mix)
10. "How Many" (the Larry K Classic Club Mix)
