= Fui ni =

Single by Tomomi Itano

from the album S×W×A×G
- B-side: "Come On!"; "Boku no Sei" (Type A); "Don't Miss It!" (Type B); "Tsuki no Inori" (Type C); "Dark Side" (Theater Ed.)
- Released: July 13, 2011 (Japan)
- Recorded: 2011
- Genre: J-pop
- Label: You, Be Cool! / King Records
- Songwriter(s): Yasushi Akimoto (lyrics)
- Producer(s): Yasushi Akimoto

Tomomi Itano singles chronology
"Dear J" (2011)	"Fui ni" (2011)	"10nen Go no Kimi e" (2012)

Music video
- "Fui ni" on YouTube

Professional ratings
Review scores
Source	Rating
Hotexpress	Favorable

"Fui ni" (ふいに) is the second solo single by Tomomi Itano (a Japanese idol, a member of AKB48). It was released in Japan on July 13, 2011, on the label You, Be Cool! (a subsidiary of King Records).

The physical CD single reached first place in the Japanese Oricon weekly singles chart. According to Oricon, it was the 59th most selling CD single of the whole year 2011 in Japan.

== Background ==
The single was released in four versions: Type A, Type B, Type C, and a theater edition.

== Track listing ==
=== Type A ===
CD
No.	Title	Length
1.	"Fui ni" (ふいに)
2.	"Come On!" (Come on!)
3.	"Boku no Sei" (僕のせい)
4.	"Fui ni (Instrumental)" (ふいに -Instrumental-)
5.	"Come On! (Instrumental)" (Come on! -Instrumental-)
6.	"Boku no Sei (Instrumental)" (僕のせい -Instrumental-)

DVD
No.	Title	Length
1.	"Fui ni (Music Video)" (ふいに MUSIC CLIP)
2.	"Tomo Collection (Summer 7 Days Style)" (Tomo Collection -SUMMER 7DAYS STYLE-)

=== Type B ===
CD
No.	Title	Length
1.	"Fui ni" (ふいに)
2.	"Come On!" (Come on!)
3.	"Don't Miss It!" (Don't miss it!)
4.	"Fui ni (Instrumental)" (ふいに -Instrumental-)
5.	"Come On! (Instrumental)" (Come on! -Instrumental-)
6.	"Don't Miss It! (Instrumental)" (Don't miss it! -Instrumental-)

DVD
No.	Title	Length
1.	"Fui ni (Music Video)" (ふいに MUSIC CLIP)
2.	"Tomomi Itano Interview (English Speaking Area Ver.)" (Tomomi Itano Interview -English Speaking Area Ver.-)

=== Type C ===
CD
No.	Title	Length
1.	"Fui ni" (ふいに)
2.	"Come On!" (Come on!)
3.	"Tsuki no Inori" (月の祈り)
4.	"Fui ni (Instrumental)" (ふいに -Instrumental-)
5.	"Come On! (Instrumental)" (Come on! -Instrumental-)
6.	"Tsuki no Inori (Instrumental)" (月の祈り -Instrumental-)

DVD
No.	Title	Length
1.	"Fui ni (Music Video)" (ふいに MUSIC CLIP)
2.	"Fui ni (Making-of)" (ふいに MAKING CLIP)

=== Theater Edition ===
CD
No.	Title	Length
1.	"Fui ni" (ふいに)
2.	"Come On!" (Come on!)
3.	"Dark Side" (Dark side)
4.	"Mōsō Denwa "Moshi, Itano Tomomi ga Koibito Dattara..." 1" (妄想電話「もし、板野友美が恋人だったら…」①)
5.	"Mōsō Denwa "Moshi, Itano Tomomi ga Koibito Dattara..." 2" (妄想電話「もし、板野友美が恋人だったら…」②)
6.	"Mōsō Denwa "Moshi, Itano Tomomi ga Koibito Dattara..." 3" (妄想電話「もし、板野友美が恋人だったら…」③)

== Charts ==
Chart (2011)	Peak position
Japan (Oricon Daily Singles Chart)	1
Japan (Oricon Weekly Singles Chart)	1
Japan (Oricon Monthly Singles Chart)	10
Japan (Billboard Japan Hot 100)	1
Japan (Billboard Japan Hot Singles Sales)	2
Japan (Billboard Japan Hot Top Airplay)	5
Japan (Billboard Japan Adult Contemporary Airplay)	14

== Year-end charts ==
Chart (2011)	Peak position
Japan (Oricon Year-end Singles Chart)	59
