= Loca (EP) =

EP by Tomomi Itano
- Released: October 16, 2019
- Recorded: 2019
- Length: 23:23
- Label: King Records

Tomomi Itano chronology
Get Ready (2016)	Loca (2019)

Loca is the first mini-album released by Japanese singer-songwriter Tomomi Itano. It was released in Japan on King Records on October 16, 2019. It was released in two versions: a limited CD+DVD edition and a regular CD edition. No physical singles were released from Loca, making it Itano's first album without any singles.

== Release and sales ==
The album received criticism that its title track plagiarized "Señorita" by Shawn Mendes and Camila Cabello. The album sold poorly, selling about 2,000 copies before promotion campaigns for the album were abruptly halted.

== Track listing ==
All tracks are written by Yuta Nakano.

CD
No.	Title	Length
1.	"Koigokoro (恋ゴコロ; Awakening of Love)"	3:33
2.	"LOCA"	3:27
3.	"LOVE SEEKER"	4:01
4.	"Destiny"	4:42
5.	"Ace no B-kun (エースのB君; B-kun of Ace)"	3:43
6.	"Kimi ni Okuru Uta (君に贈るうた; A Song for You)"	3:57
Total length:		23:23
