= Flawless (1999 film) =

1999 film

- Theatrical release poster
- Directed by: Joel Schumacher
- Written by: Joel Schumacher
- Produced by: Joel Schumacher; Jane Rosenthal; Robert De Niro (uncredited); Neil Machlis
- Starring: Robert De Niro; Philip Seymour Hoffman; Barry Miller; Chris Bauer; Wilson Jermaine Heredia; Daphne Rubin-Vega
- Cinematography: Declan Quinn
- Edited by: Mark Stevens
- Music by: Bruce Roberts
- Production companies: Metro-Goldwyn-Mayer Pictures; TriBeCa Productions
- Distributed by: MGM Distribution Co.
- Release date: November 26, 1999
- Running time: 112 minutes
- Country: United States
- Language: English
- Budget: $27 million
- Box office: $4,488,529

Flawless is a 1999 American crime drama film written and directed by Joel Schumacher and starring Robert De Niro and Philip Seymour Hoffman.

The film is set in an apartment complex, and covers the relationships between its residents. A retired security guard suffers a stroke while trying to help a neighbor. He is left partially paralyzed and with an impaired ability to speak. He hires a neighboring drag queen to give him singing lessons with hope of improving his speech ability.

== Plot ==
Retired decorated security guard Walter Koontz lives in a downtown apartment complex, where he is in constant conflict with drag queen Rusty and his friends. He frequents a nightclub at which he is an expert tango dancer, and from which he conducts a superficial sexual relationship with dance partner Karen. At the same time, he rejects Tia, whom he considers a whore.

One night, crime boss "Mr. Z" and two goons come to the building looking for the money that Amber's boyfriend stole from his organization. Having heard gunshots upstairs, Walt suffers a stroke while ascending the stairs to help. He awakens with the right side of his body paralyzed, resulting in poor speech and posture, and giving him a limp that requires the use of a cane. Walter's self-confidence and general state of mind suffer, and he becomes ashamed to be seen in public, even skipping therapy, leading his doctor to visit him at home. His physical therapist, who had been sent to Walt's home by the doctor, recommends a singing teacher to improve his speech. When Walt hails a taxi outside of the building, he falls and drops the plan.

Rusty desires to have sex reassignment surgery, but he lacks the money. When Walter comes to Rusty to use his musical talents for singing lessons, the pair, while initially argumentative and uncomfortable with each other, slowly become friends. Walter begins to gain confidence, and he progresses toward resuming a normal life as his speech shows considerable improvement.

Meanwhile, after having been told by Rusty that everyone pays in a relationship, including husbands and boyfriends, Walt phones Karen. After she claims to have rent problems, Walt lies that all his money went to therapy. After hearing this, she holds off on seeing him. Tia visits his apartment, and they dance and kiss. She leaves, however, when Walt states his belief that his former colleague and friend Tommy must have hired her.

Walt tells Rusty that a former colleague of his and Tommy's abused his friendship by hitching a ride to the airport after having stolen a fortune from their employer. Rusty responds with his own confession: He had taken Mr. Z's money after the police had vacated the building to pay for surgery, meaning that the singing lessons had been a front.

Feeling used again, Walt leaves in anger. Building superintendent Leo, who had been threatened by Mr. Z, opens Rusty's medical bill, realizing that he has the money. Walt returns to the nightclub for the first time since his stroke and makes up with Tia. When he returns, Leo tells him to ignore any sounds that he might hear that night.

The three criminals ambush Rusty in his apartment, and Walt goes upstairs again. Together, Rusty and Walt manage to kill them. Wounded, Walt is put in an ambulance, after which Rusty hands the paramedics the cash to pay for the best care available. They renew their friendship and singing lessons.

== Cast ==
- Robert De Niro as Walter Koontz
- Philip Seymour Hoffman as Rusty
- Skipp Sudduth as Tommy
- Barry Miller as Leonard Wilcox
- Chris Bauer as Jacko
- Wilson Jermaine Heredia as Cha-Cha
- Nashom Wooden as Amazing Grace (credited as Nashom Benjamin)
- Daphne Rubin-Vega as Tia
- Rory Cochrane as Pogo
- Scott Allen Cooper as Ivana
- Jude Ciccolella as Detective Noonan
- Mark Margolis as Vinnie
- Mina Bern as Mrs. Spivak
- Penny Balfour as Cristal
- Victor Rasuk (uncredited) as Neighborhood boy
- Richie Lamontagne as Carmine the Pizza Boy
- Luis Saguar as Mr. Z
- Mitchell Lichtenstein as Gay Republican Spokesperson
- John Enos as Sonny, Rusty's abusive boyfriend
- Karina Arroyave as Amber
- Wanda De Jesus as Karen
- Madhur Jaffrey as Nirmala
- John R. Corcoran as Physical Therapist LaShaun

== Production ==
=== Casting ===
Hoffman considered De Niro to be the most imposing actor with whom he had ever worked, noting how De Niro had the ability during filming to "listen" to him as an actor, and, in turn, make Hoffman respond similarly because of his unique style of acting. Hoffman felt that his exposure to that level of acting profoundly improved his own abilities as an actor.

== Soundtrack ==
1. "Planet Love" – Taylor Dayne (Allee Willis; Bruce Roberts)
2. "Half-Breed" – Cher (Al Capps; Mary Dean)
3. "Lady Marmalade" (Live) – Patti LaBelle (Bob Crewe; Kenny Nolan)
4. "When the Money's Gone" – Bruce Roberts feat. Elton John & Kristine W (Bruce Roberts; Donna Weiss)
5. "G.A.Y." – Geri Halliwell (Geri Halliwell; Watkins; Wilson)
6. "When Will You Learn" – Boy George (G. O'Dowd; John Themis; Mike Koglin)
7. "La Chica Marita" – Marcus Schenkenberg (J. Beauvoir; T. Catania)
8. "Turn Me Over" – Wonderbox (Monica Murphy)
9. "Lady Marmalade" – All Saints (Bob Crewe; Kenny Nolan)
10. "Sidewalk Talk" – John "Jellybean" Benitez (Madonna)
11. "Can't Stop Love" – Soul Solution (Bobby Guy; Ernie Lake)
12. "Give It to Me" – Drama Kidz (Danny Sullivan; E. Holterhoff; Jellybean)
13. "The Name Game" – Shirley Ellis (Lincoln Chase; Shirley Ellis)
14. "Whenever You Fall" – Taylor Dayne (Taylor Dayne; B.G. Craziose; Ernie Lake; Janice Robinson)
15. "The Neighborhood" – Bruce Roberts; Gohl; Sarah McLachlan (Bruce Roberts)
16. "Tia's Tango" – Bruce Roberts; Gohl; Sarah McLachlan (Bruce Roberts)
17. "Luciano" – Bruce Roberts; Gohl; Sarah McLachlan (Bruce Roberts)
18. Orchestral music in the film performed by the Eos Orchestra of New York, with Jonathan Sheffer conductor. Stephen Vann, producer.

== Release ==
In the United Kingdom, the film was released by Optimum Releasing as part of a two-film distribution deal with MGM.

== Reception ==
Review-aggregate site Rotten Tomatoes reports a 42% approval rating based on 52 reviews, with an average rating of 5.6/10, and a consensus of: "Robert De Niro and Philip Seymour Hoffman's Flawless performances live up to this dramedy's title; unfortunately, they're outweighed by the misguided picture surrounding them." Metacritic, which uses a weighted average, assigned the film a score of 50 out of 100, based on 33 critics, indicating "mixed or average" reviews. Audiences surveyed by CinemaScore gave the film a grade of "C" on a scale of A+ to F.

Hoffman was praised by critics for his ability to avoid clichés when playing such a delicate role. Emily St. James, a transgender film critic, praised the warmth of his portrayal of Rusty, commenting that "Hoffman's work is quiet, moving, and humanistic, and it provides the film with a core Schumacher doesn't remotely earn. No matter; this is another movie worth seeing almost entirely for the titanic work Hoffman does near its center."

Roger Ebert of the Chicago Sun-Times highlighted Hoffman as "one of the best new character actors", remarking that he was "able to take a flamboyant role and find the quiet details in it".

Hoffman won Best Actor in a Motion Picture – Comedy or Musical at the 4th Golden Satellite Awards. He also received a Screen Actors Guild Award nomination for Best Lead Actor, ultimately losing to Kevin Spacey for American Beauty.
