= Planet Love =

- CD Single

Single by Taylor Dayne

from the album Flawless Soundtrack
- Released: 2000
- Recorded: 2000
- Genre: Dance-pop
- Length: 4:03
- Label: Jellybean Recordings
- Songwriters: Bruce Roberts; Allee Willis
- Producers: Taylor Dayne; Pete Lorimer

Taylor Dayne singles chronology
"Naked Without You" (1999)	"Planet Love" (2000)	"How Many" (2002)

"Planet Love" is a song by Taylor Dayne, which was the leading single from the MGM motion picture soundtrack for the 1999 film Flawless, starring Robert De Niro and Philip Seymour Hoffman. It was released on March 21, 2000.

The song was released by John Benitez's (A.K.A. Jellybean) record label.

== Charts ==
The song peaked at number one on the Billboard Hot Dance Music/Club Play chart in 2000.

== CD maxi single track listing ==
1. Original vocal mix – 7:29
2. Freiburn & Urik vocal mix – 11:29
3. Original radio mix – 4:03
4. Freiburn & Urik radio mix – 4:04
5. The Really Stereo Experience Dub – 7:13
6. Freiburn & Urik instrumental – 11:30

== See also ==
- List of number-one dance singles of 2000 (U.S.)
