= Feel (Roachford album) =

Studio album by Roachford
- Released: 29 September 1997
- Label: Columbia

Roachford chronology
Permanent Shade of Blue (1994)	Feel (1997)	The Roachford Files (2000)

Professional ratings
Review scores
Source	Rating
AllMusic	2.5/5 stars

Feel is the fourth album by British band Roachford, released in 1997 on Columbia Records. It includes three singles which reached the UK Singles Chart: "The Way I Feel" (No. 20), "How Could I? (Insecurity)" (No. 34), and "Naked Without You" (No. 53). "Naked Without You" was later recorded by American singer Taylor Dayne for her 1998 album of the same name, along with another Andrew Roachford-written song included on this album, "Don't Make Me Love You".

== Track listing ==
All tracks written by Andrew Roachford, except where noted.

No.	Title	Writer(s)	Length
1.	"The Way I Feel"		3:46
2.	"How Could I? (Insecurity)"		3:44
3.	"Don't Make Me Love You"		3:52
4.	"Someday"		3:30
5.	"Naked Without You"	Rick Nowels; Andrew Roachford; Billy Steinberg	3:29
6.	"Nothing Free"		4:29
7.	"Move On"		4:27
8.	"Down"		4:04
9.	"Testify"		3:37
10.	"Time"		7:32
11.	"Flow"		4:41

== Charts ==
Chart performance for Feel
Chart (1997)	Peak position
Australian Albums (ARIA)	61
Austrian Albums (Ö3 Austria)	47
German Albums (Offizielle Top 100)	37
Swiss Albums (Schweizer Hitparade)	50
UK Albums (OCC)	19
