= Roachford (album) =

Studio album by Roachford
- Released: 9 September 1988
- Recorded: 1987−88
- Label: Columbia
- Producer: Mike Vernon; Fayney; Andrew Roachford

Roachford chronology
Roachford (1988)	Get Ready! (1991)

Professional ratings
Review scores
Source	Rating
AllMusic	4.5/5 stars
Robert Christgau	B−
Stereo Review	excellent

Roachford is the debut studio album by the British band Roachford, released on 9 September 1988 by Columbia Records. It includes the single "Cuddly Toy", which reached number four on the UK singles chart and number 25 on the US Billboard Hot 100 in 1989, becoming the band's biggest hit on both charts.

== Track listing ==
All tracks are written by Andrew Roachford.

No.	Title	Length
1.	"Give It Up"	3:40
2.	"Family Man"	3:46
3.	"Cuddly Toy"	3:49
4.	"Find Me Another Love"	4:20
5.	"No Way"	4:03
6.	"Kathleen"	5:50
7.	"Beautiful Morning"	3:53
8.	"Lying Again"	3:32
9.	"Since"	3:22
10.	"Nobody But You"	4:24

== Personnel ==
- Andrew Roachford – lead vocals, keyboards, synth bass, backing vocals
- Michael Brown – guitar, backing vocals
- Hawi Gondwe – guitar, backing vocals
- Paul Bruce – bass
- Derrick Taylor – bass
- Chris Taylor – drums, percussion, backing vocals
- Mark Feltham – harmonica
- Fayney – effects, percussion
- Delina Raime – backing vocals
- Mike Vernon – backing vocals
- Shola Phillips – backing vocals
- George Chandler – backing vocals
- Jimmy Chambers – backing vocals
- Jimmy Helms – backing vocals
- Marianne Stephens – backing vocals

== Charts and certifications ==
=== Weekly charts ===
Chart (1989)	Peak position
Swedish Albums Chart	48
UK Albums Chart	11
US Billboard 200	109

=== Certifications ===
Region	Certification	Certified units/sales
United Kingdom (BPI)	Gold	100,000^{^}
^{^} Shipments figures based on certification alone.
