= Tomomi Itano =

Japanese singer, model, and actress (born 1991)

- 板野 友美
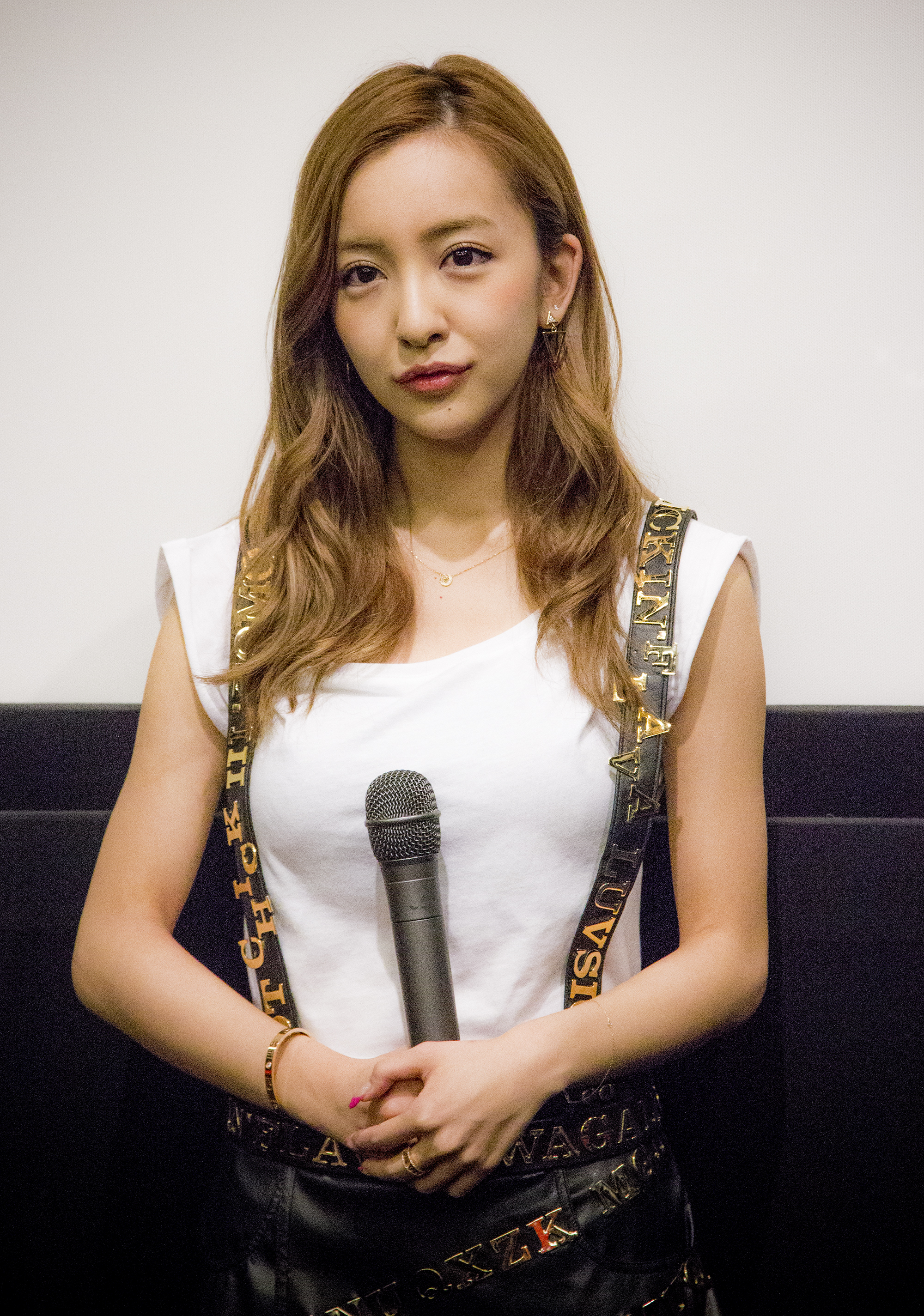
- Itano at the J-POP Summit Festival 2014 press conference in San Francisco, U.S.
- Born: July 3, 1991 (age 35); Yokohama, Kanagawa Prefecture
- Other name: Tomochin (ともちん)
- Occupations: Singer; songwriter; actress; model
- Years active: 2005–present
- Spouse: Keiji Takahashi (m. 2021)
- Children: 1
- Family: Narumi Itano (younger sister)
- Musical career
- Genres: J-pop; R&B; hip hop; electronic
- Instruments: Vocals; Piano
- Label: You, Be Cool!/King
- Website: TomomiItano.jp

Signature
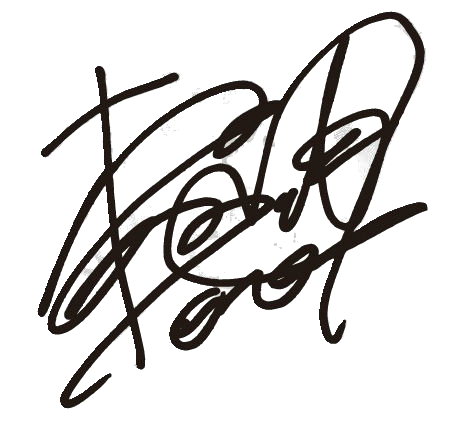

Tomomi Itano (板野 友美, Itano Tomomi; born July 3, 1991) is a Japanese performing artist, actress, model and entrepreneur. Nicknamed Tomochin (ともちん), she is best known as a former member of the Japanese idol girl group AKB48. In 2011, she debuted solo with a single titled "Dear J", which was followed the same year by "Fui ni" (number 1 in Japan), and later by "10nen Go no Kimi e" (2012) and "1%" (2013).

== Life and career ==
=== 2005–2013: Early career beginnings and AKB48 ===
Born in Yokohama, Kanagawa Prefecture, Itano joined the Japanese idol girl group AKB48 as part of their original generation in 2005. She also modeled for the women's fashion magazine Cawaii!, and released her first photo book titled T.O.M.O.row in April 2009. In early 2010, she played Shibuya in AKB48's TV Tokyo drama Majisuka Gakuen. She had a recurring role on Kamen Rider W as Queen, alongside fellow AKB48 performer Tomomi Kasai, until the show ended in late 2010. Together, they made up the sub-unit Queen & Elizabeth. In AKB48's 2010 general election, she placed fourth overall.

=== 2010-2013: Solo Singles and Majisuka Gakuen 2 ===
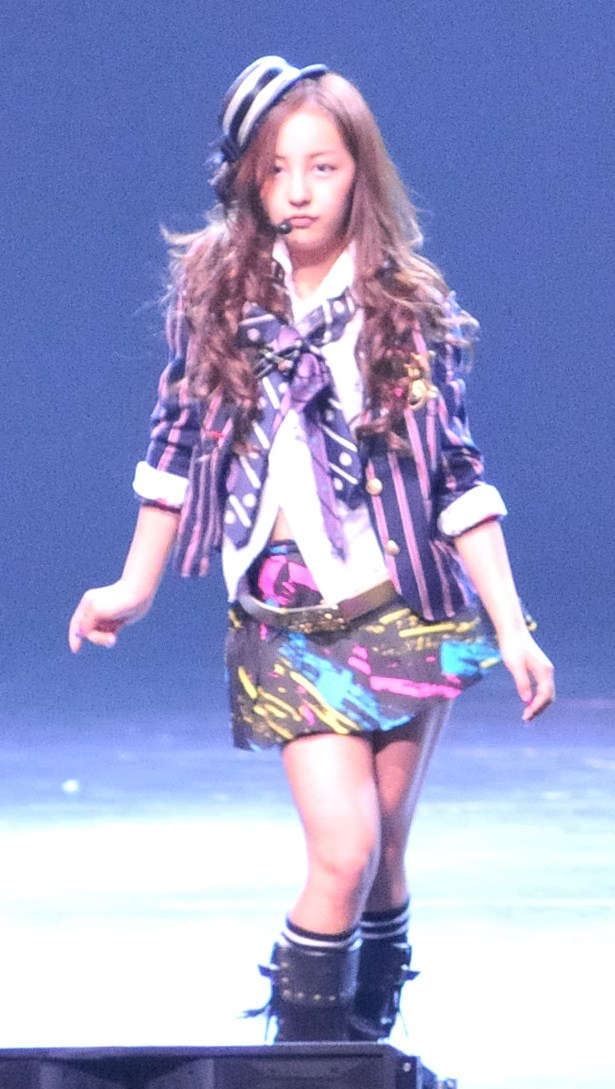
Tomomi Itano in an AKB48 presentation at the 2010 Anime Expo, in Los Angeles.

Itano released her first single, "Dear J", on January 26, 2011. It reached number 1 on the Oricon daily ranking and number 2 on the Oricon weekly ranking, selling 204,981 copies. In April, she reprised her role as Shibuya in Majisuka Gakuen 2. Her first digital single "Wanna Be Now" reached number 2 on Recochoku's daily charts and number 6 on the weekly charts. She placed eighth overall in AKB48's 2011 general election held in June. Her second single, "Fui ni", was released on July 13 and sold 90,103 copies, and reached number one on the Oricon weekly chart.

In 2012, Itano was cited as the "Queen of TV commercials" for having more contracts with companies than any other female tarento (although her count of 20 was technically a tie with those of fellow AKB48 member Mariko Shinoda).

=== 2013: Graduation from AKB48 and new beginnings ===
On February 1, 2013, during an AKB48 stage greeting, Itano announced she was leaving the group. She released her fourth solo single, "1%", on June 12. The title track was used in television commercials for Samantha Vega. The music video was shot in New York, and includes an appearance by the American actress and model Taylor Momsen. Itano had her farewell "graduation" ceremony at the Tokyo Dome on August 25, and a follow-up performance on August 27 at the AKB48 Theater; the performance was streamed live by Nico Nico Namahousou. Her graduation song is "Saigo no Door", which was released as a B-side on one of the editions of AKB48's single "Koisuru Fortune Cookie".

=== 2014–present: Solo career success ===
In an interview with Japanese entertainment website Nihongogo, Itano shared her thoughts on transitioning to a solo artist "In a group you perform as a unit with each member playing a certain character role, however as a solo artist you have to be able to play all the roles at once. You have to take on the roles of being cool, sexy, and cute and although it’s definitely a challenge, it’s something I have to strive for achieving."

In July 2014, Tomomi Itano made her U.S. performance debut at Union Square in San Francisco for J-POP Summit Festival 2014.

Tomomi Itano has been cast the lead role of a Japanese foreign student based in China alongside Taiwanese singer-actor Dino Lee in the Chinese romance movie Raincoat (雨衣), as revealed in a press conference the duo appeared in on 29 September 2015. The projected 2-month filming period for the movie that takes place in Shanghai and Tokyo is ongoing. The film is expected for a release in Spring 2016 in three countries.

== Discography ==
=== Studio albums ===
1. Swag (July 2, 2014)
2. Get Ready (November 2, 2016)

=== Extended plays ===
1. Loca (October 16, 2019)

=== Singles ===
Title	Release date	Chart positions			Sales (Oricon)		Album
Title	Release date	Oricon Weekly Singles Chart	Billboard Japan Hot 100	RIAJ Digital Track Chart^{*}	First week	Total	Album
"Dear J"	January 26, 2011	2	2	1	162,871	216,781	Swag
"Fui ni" (ふいに; "Unexpectedly")	July 13, 2011	1	1	8	90,103	115,497	Swag
"10nen Go no Kimi e" (10年後の君へ, Jūnen Go no Kimi e; "To You, After 10 Years")	April 26, 2012	2	2	3	72,911	94,059	Swag
"1%" (Ichi Pāsento; "One Percent")	June 12, 2013	4	4		44,630	56,094	Swag
"Little"	February 5, 2014	3	14		34,037	42,497	Swag
"COME PARTY!"	December 17, 2014	6	12		15,058	19,500	Get Ready
"Gimme Gimme Luv"	July 1, 2015	6	17		14,803		Get Ready
"HIDE & SEEK"	April 20, 2016	11	38		9,019		Get Ready
"#Iine!" (＃いいね!, Ī ne; "#How Nice!")	May 17, 2017	11					Non-album singles
"Just As I Am"	February 28, 2018	17					Non-album singles
"Suki. Toiukoto" (すき。ということ; "Like. I say")	February 13, 2019	29					Non-album singles

* RIAJ Digital Track Chart was cancelled in July 2012.

=== Additional digital singles ===
- "Wanna Be Now" (May 11, 2011)
- "Ai ni Pierce" (愛にピアス, Ai ni Piasu; "Pierced in Love") (June 1, 2011)
- "Clone" (March 28, 2012)
- ”1%” (Dance Trial Edit) (May 15, 2013)
- “BRIGHTER” (December 4, 2013)
- “Crush” (June 18, 2014)
- ”COME PARTY” (December 10, 2014)
- “HIDE AND SEEK” (April 13, 2016)
- “OMG” (October 26, 2016)
- “Imagination Game” (July 25, 2018)
- “Kimi no Okuru Uta” (君に贈るうた, Kimi ni okuru uta; "Song to give to you") (August 7, 2019)

=== AKB48 ===
Year	No.	Title	Role	Notes
2006	Ind-1	"Sakura no Hanabiratachi"	A-side	Debut with Team A.
2006	Ind-2	"Skirt, Hirari"	A-side	
2006	1	"Aitakatta"	A-side	
2007	2	"Seifuku ga Jama o Suru"	A-side	
2007	3	"Keibetsu Shiteita Aijō"	A-side	
2007	4	"Bingo!"	A-side	
2007	5	"Boku no Taiyō"	A-side	
2007	6	"Yūhi o Miteiru ka?"	A-side	
2008	7	"Romance, Irane"	A-side	
2008	8	"Sakura no Hanabiratachi 2008"	A-side	
2008	9	"Baby! Baby! Baby!"	A-side	
2008	10	"Ōgoe Diamond"	A-side	
2009	11	"10nen Sakura"	A-side	
2009	12	"Namida Surprise!"	A-side	
2009	13	"Iiwake Maybe"	A-side	Ranked 7th in 2009 General Election.
2009	14	"River"	A-side	
2010	15	"Sakura no Shiori"	A-side	Debut with Team K. Also sang on "Majisuka Rock 'n' Roll".
2010	16	"Ponytail to Shushu"	A-side	Also sang on "Majijo Teppen Blues"
2010	17	"Heavy Rotation"	A-side	Ranked 4th in 2010 General Election. Also sang on "Yasai Sisters" and "Lucky Seven".
2010	18	"Beginner"	A-side	
2010	19	"Chance no Junban"	B-side	Did not sing on title track; lineup was determined by rock-paper-scissors tournament. Sang on "Yoyakushita Christmas"; and "Alive" with Team K.
2011	20	"Sakura no Ki ni Narō"	A-side	
2011	–	"Dareka no Tame ni – What can I do for someone?"	–	charity single
2011	21	"Everyday, Katyusha"	A-side	Also sang on "Korekara Wonderland" and "Yankee Soul".
2011	22	"Flying Get"	A-side, Yasai Sisters 2011	Ranked 8th in 2011 General Election. Also sang on "Seishun to Kizukanai Mama"; "Yasai Uranai" as Yasai Sisters 2011; and "Ice no Kuchizuke".
2011	23	"Kaze wa Fuiteiru"	A-side	
2011	24	"Ue kara Mariko"	B-side	Did not sing on title track; lineup was determined by rock-paper-scissors tournament; She sang on "Noël no Yoru"; and on "Zero-sum Taiyō" as Team K.
2012	25	"Give Me Five!"	A-side (Baby Blossom), Selection 6	Played shaker in Baby Blossom; She also sang on "Sweet & Bitter" as Selection 6.
2012	26	"Manatsu no Sounds Good!"	A-side	Also sang on "Choudai, Darling!"
2012	27	"Gingham Check"	A-side	Ranked 8th in 2012 General Election. Also sang on "Yume no Kawa".
2012	28	"Uza"	A-side, New Team K	Also sang on "Scrap & Build" as New Team K.
2012	29	"Eien Pressure"	A-side	Placed 13th in rock-paper-scissors tournament. Sang on "Totteoki Christmas"
2013	30	"So Long!"	A-side	Also sang on "Yuuhi Marie" as Team K.
2013	31	"Sayonara Crawl"	A-side, Center	Also sang on "How Come?" as Team K.
2013	32	"Koisuru Fortune Cookie"	A-side	Ranked 11th in 2013 General Election. Also sang on "Namida no Sei Janai" and "Saigo no Door", the latter of which was her graduation song.
2016	43	"Kimi wa Melody"	A-side	Marked as the 10th Anniversary Single. Participated as graduated member.

== Theater performances ==
=== With AKB48 ===
Team A 1st Stage "Party ga Hajimaruyo" (Partyが始まるよ)

1. Skirt, Hirari (2nd Unit) (スカートひらり)
2. Hoshi no Ondo (1st Unit) (星の温度)

Team A 2nd Stage "Aitakatta" (会いたかった)

1. Nageki no Figure (嘆きのフィギュア)
2. Garasu no I Love You (ガラスのI Love You)
3. Senaka Kara Dakishimete (背中から抱きしめて)
4. Rio no Kakumei (リオの革命)

Team A 3rd Stage "Dareka no Tameni" (誰かのために)

1. Nage Kissu de Uchiotose! (投げキッスで撃ち落とせ！)
2. Seifuku ga Jama osuru (制服が邪魔をする)

Team A 4th Stage "Tadaima Rennai Chū" (ただいま恋愛中)

1. Faint

Himawarigumi 1st Stage "Boku no Taiyō" (僕の太陽)

1. Itoshisa no defence (愛しさのdefence)
2. Idol Nante Yobanaide (アイドルなんて呼ばないで)

Himawarigumi 2nd Stage "Yumewo Shinaseru Wakeni Ikanai" (夢を死なせるわけにいかない)

1. Confession

Team A 5th Stage "Rennai Kinshi Jōrei" (恋愛禁止条例)

1. Tsundere! (ツンデレ！)

Team K 6th Stage "Reset"

1. Seifuku Resistance (制服レジスタンス)

=== As AKB48 subunits ===
- Honegumi from AKB48
- Natto Angels
- Queen & Elizabeth
- Team Dragon from AKB48
- AKB Idoling !! !

== Filmography ==
=== Movies ===
- Densen Uta (2007)
- Ai Ryutsu Centre (2008)
- Kamen Rider × Kamen Rider W & Decade: Movie War 2010 (2009) as Queen
- Kamen Rider W Forever: A to Z/The Gaia Memories of Fate (2010) as Queen
- Kamen Rider × Kamen Rider OOO & W Featuring Skull: Movie War Core (2010) as Queen
- Bad Boys J: Saigo ni Mamoru Mono (2013)
- The Virgin Psychics (2015) as Eri
- The Stare (2016)
- Raincoat (2016)
- 星くず兄弟の新たな伝説 (2018)
- Imagination Game (2018)
- Diner (2019)
- Prison 13 (2019)
- Katsu Fūtarō!! (2019)

=== Dramas ===
- Kamen Rider W (TV Asahi, 2009) (as Queen)
- Majisuka Gakuen (TV Tokyo, 2010) (as Shibuya)
- Sakura kara no Tegami (NTV, 2011) (as herself)
- Majisuka Gakuen 2 (TV Tokyo, 2011) (as Shibuya)
- So Long! (NTV, 2013)
- Bad Boys J (NTV, 2013) (as Nakai Kaori)
- Cook Keibu (TBS, 2016)
- FRINGE-MAN (TV Tokyo, 2017)
- Mikaiketsu (TV Asahi, 2018)

=== Radio ===
- AKB48 Ashita made Mou Chotto (明日までもうちょっと。) (2007-10-15, JOQR-AM)
- TomoTomo no Yagi-san, Oide (ともとものヤギさん、おいで～♪) (2008-04-07 – present, JOKR-AM)
- AKB48 no All Night Nippon (AKB48のオールナイトニッポン7) (2010-04-09 –, JOLF-AM)
