= 10nen Go no Kimi e =

Single by Tomomi Itano

from the album S×W×A×G
- B-side: "Clone"; "Deal" feat. NO-FACE (Type A); "Always I Need You" (Type B); "Lose-lose" (Regular Ed.); "Seifuku Resistance" (Itano Solo Ver.) (Theater Ed.)
- Released: April 25, 2012 (Japan)
- Genre: J-pop
- Label: You, Be Cool! / King Records
- Songwriter(s): Yasushi Akimoto (lyrics)
- Producer(s): Yasushi Akimoto

Tomomi Itano singles chronology
"Fui ni" (2011)	"10nen Go no Kimi e" (2012)	"1%" (2013)

Music video
- "10nen Go no Kimi e" on YouTube

Professional ratings
Review scores
Source	Rating
Hotexpress / Billboard Japan	Favorable

"10nen Go no Kimi e" (10年後の君へ) is the third solo single by Tomomi Itano (a Japanese idol, a member of AKB48). It was released in Japan on April 25, 2012, on the label You, Be Cool! (a subsidiary of King Records).

The physical CD single reached second place in the Japanese Oricon weekly singles chart. According to Oricon, it was the 85th most selling CD single of the whole year 2012 in Japan.

== Background ==
The single was released in four versions: Type A, Type B, a regular edition, and a theater edition.

== Track listing ==
=== Type A ===
CD
No.	Title	Length
1.	"10nen Go no Kimi e" (10年後の君へ)
2.	"Clone"
3.	"Deal feat. No-Face" (deal feat.NO-FACE)
4.	"10nen Go no Kimi e (Instrumental)" (10年後の君へ -instrumental-)
5.	"Clone (Instrumental)" (Clone -instrumental-)
6.	"Deal feat. No-Face (Instrumental)" (deal feat.NO-FACE -instrumental-)

DVD
No.	Title	Length
1.	"10nen Go no Kimi e (Music Video)" (10年後の君へ Music Video)
2.	"10nen Go no Kimi e (Making-of)" (10年後の君へ Making Clip)

=== Type B ===
CD
No.	Title	Length
1.	"10nen Go no Kimi e" (10年後の君へ)
2.	"Clone"
3.	"Always I Need You" (Always I need you)
4.	"10nen Go no Kimi e (Instrumental)" (10年後の君へ -instrumental-)
5.	"Clone (Instrumental)" (Clone -instrumental-)
6.	"Always I Need You (Instrumental)" (Always I need you -instrumental-)

DVD
No.	Title	Length
1.	"Clone (Music Video)" (Clone Music Video)
2.	"Clone (Making-of)" (Clone Making Clip)

=== Regular Edition ===
CD
No.	Title	Length
1.	"10nen Go no Kimi e" (10年後の君へ)
2.	"Clone"
3.	"Lose-lose" (lose-lose)
4.	"10nen Go no Kimi e (Instrumental)" (10年後の君へ -instrumental-)
5.	"Clone (Instrumental)" (Clone -instrumental-)
6.	"Lose-lose (Instrumental)" (lose-lose -instrumental-)

=== Theater Edition ===
CD
No.	Title	Length
1.	"10nen Go no Kimi e" (10年後の君へ)
2.	"Clone"
3.	"Seifuku Resistance (Itano Solo Ver.)" (制服レジスタンス（板野ソロVer.）)
4.	"10nen Go no Kimi e (Instrumental)" (10年後の君へ -instrumental-)
5.	"Clone (Instrumental)" (Clone -instrumental-)
6.	"Seifuku Resistance (Itano Solo Ver.) (Instrumental)" (制服レジスタンス（板野ソロVer.） -instrumental-)

== Charts ==
Chart (2012)	Peak position
Japan (Oricon Daily Singles Chart)	2
Japan (Oricon Weekly Singles Chart)	2
Japan (Oricon Monthly Singles Chart)	7
Japan (Billboard Japan Hot 100)	2
Japan (Billboard Japan Hot Singles Sales)	2
Japan (Billboard Japan Hot Top Airplay)	13
Japan (Billboard Japan Adult Contemporary Airplay)	20

== Year-end charts ==
Chart (2012)	Peak position
Japan (Oricon Year-end Singles Chart)	85
