= 1% (song) =

Single by Tomomi Itano

from the album S×W×A×G
- B-side: "For You, For Me"; "Shirokuro" (Type A); "Always I Need You" (Type B); "Lose-lose" (Regular Ed.); "Shōjo A (Theater Ed.)
- Released: June 12, 2013 (Japan)
- Genre: J-pop
- Length: 4:08
- Label: You, Be Cool! / King Records
- Songwriters: Lyrics: Yasushi Akimoto (#1, #2), Tomomi Itano (#3)
- Producer: Yasushi Akimoto

Tomomi Itano singles chronology
| "10nen Go no Kimi e" (2012) | "1%" (2013) | "Little" (2014) |

Music video
- "1%" on YouTube

"1%" is the fourth solo single by Tomomi Itano (a Japanese idol, then-member of AKB48). It was released in Japan on June 12, 2013, on the label You, Be Cool! (a subsidiary of King Records).

The physical CD single reached fourth place in the Japanese Oricon weekly singles chart.

== Release ==
The single was released in four versions: Type A, Type B, a regular edition, and a theater edition.

== Music video ==
The music video, directed by Shideaki Kubō, is set in a New York night scenery and features Itano surrounded by four male dancers.

== Track listing ==
=== Type A ===
CD
| No. | Title | Length |
|---|---|---|
| 1. | "1%" |
| 2. | "For You, For Me" (For you,For me) |
| 3. | "Shirokuro" (白黒) |
| 4. | "1% (Instrumental)" (1% -instrumental-) |
| 5. | "For You, For Me (Instrumental)" (For you,For me -instrumental-) |
| 6. | "Shirokuro (Instrumental)" (白黒 -instrumental-) |

DVD
| No. | Title | Length |
|---|---|---|
| 1. | "1% (Music Video)" (1% Music Video) |
| 2. | "Making of the "1%" music video, Part 1" (1% MV Making 前編) |

=== Type B ===
CD
| No. | Title | Length |
|---|---|---|
| 1. | "1%" |
| 2. | "For You, For Me" (For you,For me) |
| 3. | "Sister" |
| 4. | "1% (Instrumental)" (1% -instrumental-) |
| 5. | "For You, For Me (Instrumental)" (For you,For me -instrumental-) |
| 6. | "Sister (Instrumental)" (Sister -instrumental-) |

DVD
| No. | Title | Length |
|---|---|---|
| 1. | "1% (Music Video)" (1% Music Video) |
| 2. | "Making of the "1%" music video, Part 2" (1% MV Making 後編) |

=== Regular Edition ===
CD
| No. | Title | Length |
|---|---|---|
| 1. | "1%" |
| 2. | "For You, For Me" (For you,For me) |
| 3. | "8 Years" (8 years) |
| 4. | "1% (Instrumental)" (1% -instrumental-) |
| 5. | "For You, For Me (Instrumental)" (For you,For me -instrumental-) |
| 6. | "8 Years (Instrumental)" (Sister -instrumental-) |

=== Theater Edition ===
CD
| No. | Title | Length |
|---|---|---|
| 1. | "1%" |
| 2. | "For You, For Me" (For you,For me) |
| 3. | "Shōjo A" (少女A) |
| 4. | "1% (Instrumental)" (1% -instrumental-) |
| 5. | "For You, For Me (Instrumental)" (For you,For me -instrumental-) |
| 6. | "Shōjo A (Instrumental)" (少女A -instrumental-) |

== Charts ==
| Chart (2013) | Peak position |
|---|---|
| Japan (Oricon Daily Singles Chart) | 3 |
| Japan (Oricon Weekly Singles Chart) | 4 |
