= Permanent Shade of Blue =

Studio album by Roachford
- Released: 4 April 1994
- Genres: R&B; pop rock; soul
- Length: 50:23
- Label: Columbia
- Producers: Andrew Roachford; Martin Phillips; Gil Norton; Tim Palmer

Roachford chronology
Get Ready! (1991)	Permanent Shade of Blue (1994)	Feel (1997)

Singles from Permanent Shade of Blue
- 1. "Only to Be with You" Released: 7 March 1994; 2. "Lay Your Love on Me" Released: 6 June 1994; 3. "This Generation" Released: 8 August 1994; 4. "Cry for Me" Released: 21 November 1994; 5. "I Know You Don't Love Me" Released: 20 March 1995

Professional ratings
Review scores
Source	Rating
AllMusic	2.5/5 stars
Music Week	3/5 stars

Permanent Shade of Blue is the third studio album by the British band Roachford, released in April 1994. The album was certified double-platinum in Australia, where it reached number two on the ARIA Albums Chart.

== Track listing ==
All tracks were written by Andrew Roachford.

No.	Title	Length
1.	"Only to Be with You"	4:21
2.	"Johnny"	4:47
3.	"Emergency"	4:37
4.	"Lay Your Love on Me"	4:06
5.	"Ride the Storm"	3:58
6.	"This Generation"	4:08
7.	"I Know You Don't Love Me"	5:43
8.	"Gus's Blues (Intro)"	0:31
9.	"Do We Wanna Live Together"	4:12
10.	"Cry for Me"	4:34
11.	"Guess I Must Be Crazy"	4:43
12.	"Higher Love"	5:23

== Personnel ==
=== Band members ===
- Andrew Roachford – vocals, keyboards, percussion, producer
- Hawi Gondwe – guitar
- Derrick Taylor – bass
- Chris Taylor – drums

=== Additional musicians ===
- Sagat Guiay – guitar on track 5
- Gus Isidore – guitar on tracks 7 and 8
- Frank Tontoh – drums on tracks 2 and 5
- Pat Roache – drums on track 10
- Chyna Gordon – backing vocals on track 6
- Faye Simpson, Lain Gray, Lawrence – backing vocals on track 12
- Jeff Beck – guitar on track 3

=== Production ===
- Martyn Phillips – producer on tracks 1 and 6
- Gil Norton – producer on track 4
- Mark O'Donohghue – engineer
- Tim Palmer, Tony Phillips – mixing

== Charts ==
=== Weekly charts ===
Chart (1994–1995)	Peak position
Australian Albums (ARIA)	2
German Albums (Offizielle Top 100)	52
New Zealand Albums (RMNZ)	11
Scottish Albums (Official Charts)	36
UK Albums (Official Charts)	25

=== Year-end charts ===
Chart (1995)	Position
Australian Albums (ARIA)	24

== Certifications ==
Region	Certification	Certified units/sales
Australia (ARIA)	2× Platinum	140,000^{^}
United Kingdom (BPI)	Gold	100,000^{^}
^{^} Shipments figures based on certification alone.
