= Cuddly Toy (song) =

1988 single by Andrew Roachford

Single by Roachford

from the album Roachford
- B-side: "Lions Den"
- Released: May 1988
- Recorded: 19–21 March 1988
- Studio: CBS Recording (Camden, London)
- Length: 3:45
- Label: CBS
- Songwriter: Andrew Roachford
- Producers: Michael H. Brauer; Andrew Roachford; Fayney

Roachford singles chronology
"Family Man" (1988)	"Cuddly Toy" (1988)	"Find Me Another Love" (1988)

Music video
- "Cuddly Toy" on YouTube

"Cuddly Toy" is a song by the British band Roachford. It was the second single taken from their eponymous debut studio album, and was their first chart hit single. It was recorded at CBS Recording Studios, Whitfield Street, Camden, London over a three-day period between 19 March and 21 March 1988. The drums were recorded in Studio 1, with the rest of the instruments recorded in Studio 2. The studio engineer was Richard Hollywood. The song was produced by Michael H. Brauer, Andrew Roachford and Fayney. It was mixed at a later date by Michael H. Brauer.

== Background ==
Roachford had not initially intended to record or release "Cuddly Toy"; the lyrics and song were considered a band in-joke. Roachford's record label, however, had noticed the song and asked the band if they would record it for their upcoming studio album. In an interview, Andrew Roachford recalled:

...my album was already finished, and [the label] said "What's this song you keep playing at the end of the set?"... and I remember the A&R guy saying "We love this song, but you can't seriously call it 'Cuddly Toy', and I went "Well if I can't call it that, I would never want to record it, because that's part of what it is", and in the end they kind of went "OK, you can call it that, but now it's never going to be a hit", and they were wrong."

== Chart performance ==
"Cuddly Toy" was first released in May 1988 and peaked inside the UK singles chart at number 61, spending four weeks inside the UK top 75. In January 1989, the song was re-released and became the band's biggest hit, peaking at number four and spending nine more weeks inside the top 75. The song was also the group's biggest hit in the United States, where it was re-titled "Cuddly Toy (Feel for Me)", peaking at number 25 on the Billboard Hot 100 in June 1989. In Australia, "Cuddly Toy" peaked at number 73 on the ARIA Singles Chart in December 1988.

== Formats and track listings ==
=== Original release (CBS ROA 2) ===
CD single

1. "Cuddly Toy" – 3:45
2. "Cuddly Toy" (extended mix) – 5:50
3. "Cuddly Toy" (The Feel for Me mix) – 4:14
4. "Lions Den" – 3:37

7-inch vinyl

1. "Cuddly Toy" – 3:45
2. "Lions Den" – 3:37

12-inch vinyl

1. "Cuddly Toy" (extended mix) – 5:50
2. "Lions Den" – 3:37
3. "Cuddly Toy" (live at Strathclyde University 27.2.88) – 7:06

Remix 12-inch vinyl

1. "Cuddly Toy" (X-Rated Acid Toy mix) – 7:21
2. "Cuddly Toy" – 3:45
3. "Lions Den" – 3:37

=== Re-release (CBS ROA 4) ===
7-inch vinyl

1. "Cuddly Toy" – 3:45
2. "Lions Den" – 3:37

12-inch vinyl

1. "Cuddly Toy" – 3:45
2. "Lions Den" – 3:37
3. "Nobody But You" (live) – 5:12
4. "Family Man" (live)

== Charts ==
=== Weekly charts ===
Chart (1988–1989)	Peak position
Australia (ARIA)	73
Belgium (Ultratop 50 Flanders)	24
Canada Top Singles (RPM)	59
Europe (Eurochart Hot 100)	14
Ireland (IRMA)	7
Italy Airplay (Music & Media)	1
Netherlands (Dutch Top 40)	18
Netherlands (Single Top 100)	17
UK Singles (Official Charts)	4
US Billboard Hot 100	25
US Dance Club Play (Billboard)	34
West Germany (GfK)	49

=== Year-end charts ===
Chart (1989)	Position
UK Singles (OCC)	65

== Certifications ==
Region	Certification	Certified units/sales
United Kingdom (BPI)	Silver	200,000^{‡}
^{‡} Sales+streaming figures based on certification alone.

== Beverley Knight version ==
"Cuddly Toy"

Single by Beverley Knight

from the album Soul UK
- Released: 28 August 2011
- Length: 3:56 (album version); 2:50 (radio version)
- Label: Hurricane
- Songwriter: Andrew Roachford
- Producer: Martin Terefe

Beverley Knight singles chronology
"Mama Used to Say" (2011)	"Cuddly Toy" (2011)	"One More Try" (2011)

Official audio
- "Cuddly Toy" on YouTube

The English singer Beverley Knight covered "Cuddly Toy" and released it as the second single release from her seventh studio album Soul UK, a tribute to British soul artists. It was released in the UK on 28 August 2011 by Hurricane Records. The B-side is a radio edit of Knight's cover version of Young Disciples's 1991 song "Apparently Nothin'", the original of which also appears on Soul UK.

Knight's version of "Cuddly Toy" was added to the BBC Radio 2 Playlist, entering the B-list, one list higher than her previous single "Mama Used to Say". Knight gave her first television performance of "Cuddly Toy" on The Rob Brydon Show on 29 July 2011.

=== Background ===
Knight said of "Cuddly Toy" that "Roachford showed a cynical British media that British soul could also be fused with a rockier sound and not only work, but be a global hit. This, as well as many of his songs, influenced my own writing style." She also spoke of the B-side "Apparently Nothin'" by saying "This was one of those moments when the clubs successfully educated radio on what they should be championing, and the public "got" it, and it was a smash. I was one of that buying public. Lyrically this is sheer brilliance and relevant for every generation."

=== Track listing ===
Digital download

1. "Cuddly Toy" (radio version) – 2:50
2. "Apparently Nothin'" (featuring Glen Scott) (radio version) – 3:13
3. "Apparently Nothin'" (Neil Thompson's Regrooved mix) – 7:15
4. "Cuddly Toy" (eSquire club mix) – 6:09

iTunes digital download

1. "Cuddly Toy" (radio version) – 2:50
2. "Apparently Nothin'" (featuring Glen Scott) (radio version) – 3:13
3. "Cuddly Toy" (Cutmore Club mix) – 7:16
4. "Cuddly Toy" (Dave Doyle club mix) – 6:09
5. "Cuddly Toy" (Dave Doyle radio edit) – 3:04

=== Release history ===
Region	Date	Format
United Kingdom	28 August 2011	Digital download
