= Get Ready! (Roachford album) =

Studio album by Roachford
- Released: 1991
- Studio: Townhouse 3; AIR Studios, London; Hit Factory, London; Remaximum, Brixton
- Label: Columbia
- Producer: Andrew Roachford; Fayney; Roachford

Roachford chronology
Roachford (1988)	Get Ready! (1991)	Permanent Shade of Blue (1994)

Professional ratings
Review scores
Source	Rating
AllMusic	3/5 stars

Get Ready! is the second studio album by the British band Roachford, released in 1991 by Columbia Records. The album's title track reached number 22 on the UK singles chart.

== Track listing ==
All tracks written by Andrew Roachford.

No.	Title	Length
1.	"Get Ready!"	4:39
2.	"Survival"	3:48
3.	"Funkee Chile"	3:26
4.	"Stone City"	4:25
5.	"Wannabee Loved Bayou"	5:00
6.	"Innocent Eyes"	4:34
7.	"Hands of Fate"	4:00
8.	"Takin' It Easy"	3:19
9.	"Higher"	4:30
10.	"Vision of the Future"	5:49
11.	"Get Ready!" (Reprise)	1:35

== Charts ==
Chart (1991)	Peak position
Australia (ARIA Charts)	176
German Albums chart	36
Swedish Albums Chart	49
UK Albums Chart	20
