= Naked Without You (song) =

1998 single by Roachford

"Naked Without You" is a song by the British band Roachford, released in 1998 as the third and final single from their 1997 album Feel. It was written by Andrew Roachford, Rick Nowels and Billy Steinberg. The single reached No. 15 on the UK R&B Singles Chart and No. 53 on the UK Singles Chart.

== Taylor Dayne version ==
"Naked Without You"

Single by Taylor Dayne

from the album Naked Without You
- Released: 1999
- Recorded: 1998
- Genre: Dance-pop
- Length: 3:51
- Label: Intersound
- Songwriters: Andrew Roachford; Rick Nowels; Billy Steinberg
- Producers: Taylor Dayne; Robbie Neil; Jez Colin

Taylor Dayne singles chronology
"Unstoppable" (1998)	"Naked Without You" (1999)	"Planet Love" (2000)

Audio video
- "Naked Without You" on YouTube

American singer Taylor Dayne recorded "Naked Without You" for her 1998 album of the same name. It was released in 1999 as the third and final single from the album. The song is originally a ballad, but due to the dance remixes served by Thunderpuss 2000, it became a hit in the clubs, subsequently peaking at No. 3 on Billboard's Hot Dance Music/Club Play chart.

=== Track listing ===
CD maxi single

1. "Naked Without You" (Thunderpuss 2000 Club Anthem)
2. "Naked Without You" (ThunderDUB)
3. "Naked Without You" (TP2K Mixshow Mix)
4. "Naked Without You" (Thunderpuss 2000 Radio Edit)
5. "Naked Without You" (Album Mix)

== Other versions ==
English singer Joe Cocker recorded his version for his seventeenth studio album No Ordinary World, released in 1999.
