= Get Ready (Tomomi Itano album) =

- Regular edition cover

Studio album by Tomomi Itano
- Released: November 2, 2016
- Genre: J-pop, dance
- Length: 39:27
- Label: King Records

Tomomi Itano chronology
Swag (2014)	Get Ready (2016)	Loca (2019)

Singles from Get Ready
- 1. "Come Party!" Released: December 17, 2014; 2. "Gimme Gimme Luv" Released: July 1, 2015; 3. "Hide & Seek" Released: April 20, 2016

Get Ready (stylized as Get Ready♡) is the second studio album released by Japanese singer-songwriter Tomomi Itano. It was released in Japan on King Records on November 2, 2016.

It was released in three versions: a limited CD+DVD edition (Type-A), a limited CD+photobook edition (Type-B), and a regular CD edition.

It included title tracks from all six of Tomomi Itano's CD singles (from the sixth single "Come Party!" to the eighth single "Hide & Seek") and four new songs.

== Track listing ==
No.	Title	Writer(s)	Length
1.	"Come Party!"	Tomomi Itano, Yesgaki	3:51
2.	"OMG"	Zachary Moon, Hiromi, Skullface, MF Pot, Hans Karlson	3:07
3.	"You Should Try Harder"		3:49
4.	"Belly Dancer"		3:48
5.	"Triple "0""	Moon, Hiromi, Henrik Nordenback, Pot	3:34
6.	"Gimme Gimme Luv"		4:05
7.	"Hide & Seek"		3:22
8.	"Watashi no Only One" (私のONLY ONE; "My Only One")		4:16
9.	"I Am"		4:41
10.	"One Last Kiss"	Itano, Matt Cab, Marchin	4:54
Total length:			39:27

Limited Edition Type A DVD
No.	Title	Length
1.	"OMG" (music video)
2.	"Come Party!" (music video)
3.	"Gimme Gimme Luv" (music video)
4.	"Hide & Seek" (music video)

Notes

- Limited edition Type B includes a photo book.

== Charts ==
=== Weekly charts ===
Chart (2016)	Peak position
Japanese Albums (Oricon)	10

=== Daily charts ===
Chart (2016)	Peak position
Japanese Albums (Oricon)	6

== Sales ==
Total reported sales: 9,502
