= Samantha Thavasa =

Japanese fashion label

Samantha Thavasa Japan Limited
- Traded as: TYO: 7829
- Industry: Retail
- Founded: Tokyo, Japan (March 1994)
- Founder: Kazumasa Terada
- Key people: Kazumasa Terada

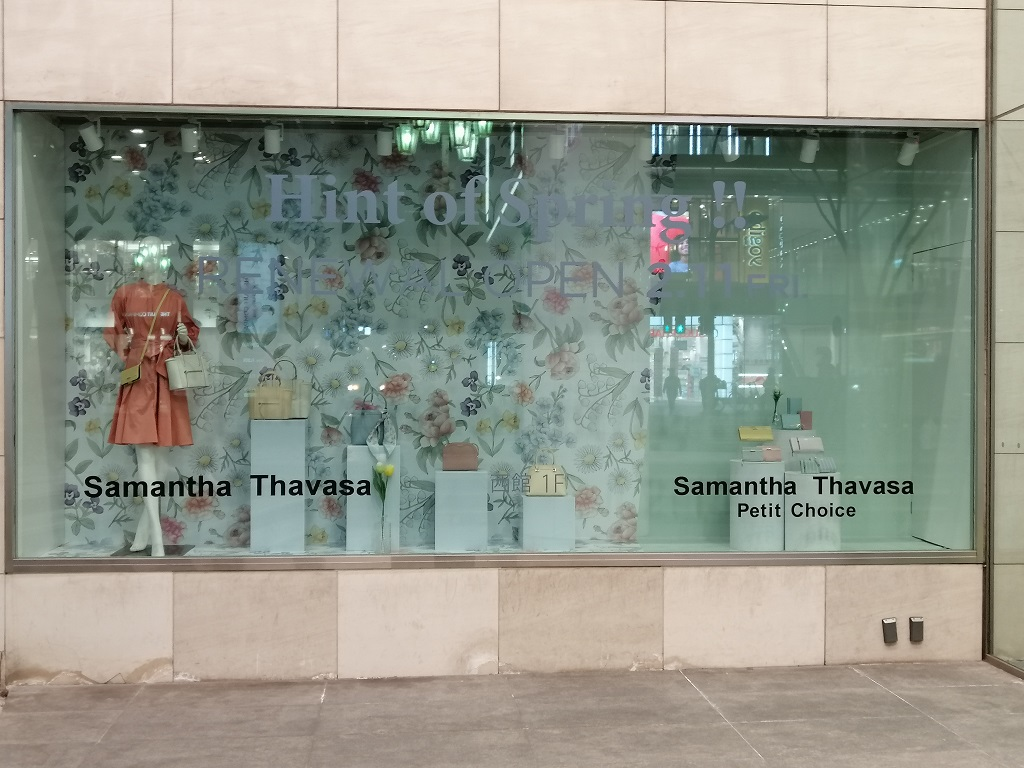
A Samantha Thavasa in Nagoya

Samantha Thavasa is a Japanese luxury fashion house founded in 1994 by Kazumasa Terada. The label is known primarily for its handbags popular among women in their twenties. Other accessory lines such as Samantha Thavasa Deluxe, Samantha Vega, Samantha Thavasa New York were created to meet different markets.

The company was founded in 1994 by Kazumasa Terada, the current CEO and president. Its name is derived from the characters Samantha and Tabitha Stephens from the American sitcom series Bewitched. The company has over 130 retail stores in Japan. In late 2006, Samantha Thavasa opened its first U.S. store in New York City.

== Marketing ==
The company's marketing strategy is typified by its extensive utilization of Western celebrities and socialites in its advertising, although Lee Byung-hun was used to promote its jewelry brand, Samantha Tiara. American singer Beyoncé along with her sister Solange Knowles and Paris Hilton and Nicky Hilton have been in advertising campaigns. Nicky Hilton, Victoria Beckham, Penelope and Monica Cruz and Tinsley Mortimer had handbag lines with the company. Singer and actress Jennifer Lopez also endorsed the brand in 2009. In 2011, Taylor Momsen also became a member of Samantha Thavasa Muse. In 2012, South Korean girl group After School promoted the summer collection line with single "Lady Luck", in a commercial. In 2013, Momsen appeared in a television commercial for Samantha Vega handbags along with one of the Japanese idol Tomomi Itano of AKB48.

Between 2006 and 2008, the company sponsored Super Aguri F1 Team to promote Samantha Kingz.

In June 2012, Australian model Miranda Kerr signed a contract to become the latest celebrity muse, and launched a handbag line titled "Miranda Kerr for Samantha Thavasa Collection" in 2016.

In September 2013, Samantha Thavasa announced that girl group Girls' Generation would be the company's endorsement models. The girls wear Samantha Thavasa skinny jeans in various colors for television ads and for their eighth single "Galaxy Supernova", released on 18 September.
