= Martika discography =

- Studio albums: 2
- Extended plays: 2
- Compilation albums: 4
- Singles: 11
- Music videos: 7

American singer Martika has released two studio albums, four compilation albums, two extended plays and 11 singles during her career, primarily from 1988 until her withdrawal from the music industry in 2000. As of 2004, she performs lead vocals in the band Oppera with her husband Michael Mozart, releasing two albums Violince (2004) and Oppera (2005).

Her self titled debut album was released in October 1988 by CBS Records International and spawned four singles – "More Than You Know", "Toy Soldiers", "I Feel the Earth Move" and "Water". The first three singles all achieved considerable commercial success internationally, however, the release of "Toy Soldiers" saw a major international market breakthrough for the singer. It reached number one on the US Billboard Hot 100 for two weeks, and was certified Gold by the Recording Industry Association of America for sales in excess of 500,000 copies. It achieved similar commercial success elsewhere, also reaching number one in New Zealand, whilst in Ireland and Switzerland it reached number three, and number five in the United Kingdom, Australia and West Germany. It was certified Platinum by the Australian Recording Industry Association for sales in excess of 70,000 copies, whilst in the United Kingdom, the British Phonographic Industry awarded it a Silver certification for sales in excess of 200,000 copies. Martika reached number two in Australia, number 11 in the United Kingdom and number 15 on the US Billboard 200, and sold over three million copies worldwide.

In July 1991, she released "Love... Thy Will Be Done" as the lead single from her second studio album, Martika's Kitchen (1991). The Prince produced and penned song reached number one in Australia, and reached the top 10 in the United Kingdom, United States, Canada, Ireland, France and New Zealand. The album was released in August 1991, and despite failing to replicate the commercial success experienced by her previous album, it did spawn the successful singles "Martika's Kitchen" and "Coloured Kisses". Martika's Kitchen is estimated to have sold one million copies worldwide. In 1992, she abruptly quit the music industry, citing burnout and feeling overwhelmed with the burden of fame.

She released a compilation album, I Feel the Earth Move, in 1998, and in 2004, her single "Toy Soldiers" was heavily sampled in "Like Toy Soldiers" released by American rapper Eminem, with Martika's receiving songwriting credits for the song. As a result of the resurgence experienced by the release of "Like Toy Soldiers", she released a further compilation album, Toy Soldiers: The Best of, in 2005. An unsuccessful comeback attempt in 2012 was spearheaded by the release of "Flow With the Go", which failed to chart, and subsequent third album, Mirror Ball, was eventually shelved.

== Albums ==
=== Solo studio albums ===
Title	Details	Chart positions										Sales	Certifications
Title	Details	US	AUS	GER	NED	NZ	UK	CAN	NOR	FIN	SWE	Sales	Certifications
Martika	Release date: October 18, 1988; Label: CBS; Formats: LP, CT, CD	15	2	—	—	11	11	17	17	20	26	AU: 140,000; CA: 100,000; UK: 300,000; US: 500,000; World: 3,000,000	RIAA: Gold; ARIA: 2× Platinum; BPI: Platinum; CRIA: Platinum
Martika's Kitchen	Release date: August 26, 1991; Label: Columbia; Formats: CT, CD	111	9	51	78	40	15	81	—	24	—	AU: 35,000; UK: 100,000; World: 1,000,000	ARIA: Gold; BPI: Gold
"—" denotes releases that did not chart or were not released.

=== As Oppera ===
Title	Details
Violince	Release date: July 6, 2004; Label: Dunda Chief; Format: CD
Oppera	Release date: May 31, 2005; Label: Dunda Chief; Format: CD

=== Compilation albums ===
Title	Details
Best of: More Than You Know	Release date: 1997; Label: Sony (UK); Formats: CT, CD
I Feel the Earth Move	Release date: August 10, 1998; Label: Columbia; Formats: CT, CD; Notes: Only released in Germany
Toy Soldiers: The Best of	Release date: January 18, 2005; Label: Columbia; Format: CD
Love... Thy Will Be Done	Release date: April 5, 2005; Label: Sony; Format: CD

== Extended plays ==
Title	Details	Notes
Special Touch	Release date: 1 December 1989; Label: CBS	Released exclusively in Japan featuring the Japanese and Spanish versions of "Toy Soldiers" and Spanish versions of "More Than You Know" and "I Feel the Earth Move".
Twelve Inch Mixes	Release date: 1992; Label: Columbia	EP of remixes

== Singles ==
=== As lead artist ===
Title	Year	Peak chart positions										Certifications	Album
Title	Year	US	US CB	SWE	AUS	CAN	GER	IRE	NLD	NZ	UK	Certifications	Album
"More Than You Know"	1988	18	17	—	160	47	—	—	—	—	121		Martika
"Toy Soldiers"	1989	1	4	4	5	4	5	3	22	1	5	ARIA: Platinum; BPI: Silver; CRIA: Gold; GLF: Gold; RMNZ: Gold	Martika
"I Feel the Earth Move"	1989	25	26	—	2	47	20	7	—	3	7	ARIA: Platinum	Martika
"More Than You Know" (re-release)	1990	—	—	—	32	—	—	10	—	—	15		Martika
"Water"	1990	—	—	—	98	—	—	—	—	—	59		Martika
"Love... Thy Will Be Done"	1991	10	10	—	1	7	26	8	27	4	9	ARIA: Platinum	Martika's Kitchen
"Martika's Kitchen"	1991	93	74	—	29	34	40	24	38	23	17		Martika's Kitchen
"Coloured Kisses"	1992	—	—	—	39	—	83	—	—	—	41		Martika's Kitchen
"Safe in the Arms of Love"	1993	—	—	—	—	—	—	—	—	—	—		Martika's Kitchen
"Flow with the Go"	2012	—	—	—	—	—	—	—	—	—	—		Mirror Ball (un–released)
"—" denotes releases that did not chart or were not released.

=== Promotional singles ===
Year	Title	Album
1993	"Spirit"	Martika's Kitchen

== Music videos ==
List of music videos showing year released, other featured artists and directors
Title	Year	Other artist(s)	Director(s)	Ref.
"More Than You Know"	1988	None	Unknown	
"Toy Soldiers"	1989	None	Jim Shea	
"I Feel the Earth Move"	1989	None	Jeffrey Hornaday	
"More Than You Know"	1990	None	Unknown	
"Love...Thy Will be Done"	1991	None	Michael Haussman	
"Martika's Kitchen"	1991	None	Luis Aira	
"Coloured Kisses"	1992	None	Rocky Schenck	
