= List of Kids Incorporated episodes =

The children's television series Kids Incorporated produced a total of 151 episodes between 1984 and 1994.

== Series overview ==
Note: The airdates are guessed. The real airdates are unknown.

Season	Episodes	Originally released		
Season	Episodes	First released	Last released	Network
1	26	September 1, 1984	December 28, 1984	Syndication
2	26	September 14, 1985	December 26, 1985	Syndication
3	13 + special	November 3, 1986	December 31, 1986	The Disney Channel
4	13	September 7, 1987	October 6, 1987	The Disney Channel
5	13	November 22, 1988	December 28, 1988	The Disney Channel
6	15	November 27, 1989	December 29, 1989	The Disney Channel
7	20	November 4, 1991	November 29, 1991	The Disney Channel
8	13	September 21, 1992	October 7, 1992	The Disney Channel
9	10	November 13, 1993	January 9, 1994	The Disney Channel

== Pilot (1983) ==
Title	Writers	Directors	Summary	Recorded	Released
"Kids Incorporated (The Beginning)"	Michael J. Hill; John Robins; Carmi Zlotnik and Andrew Cordover	Alan Cordover and Michael Dimich	Mickey has the hottest band in the neighborhood, and tries to audition for a permanent job of performing at the local malt shop. Gloria wants to become a part of the band, but Mickey refuses to let a girl into his band. Gloria's best friend Renee and her little sister Stacy decide to help Gloria get into Mickey's band. Songs: "Be Good Johnny", "Who Can It Be Now?", "Down Under", "Overkill", "De Do Do Do, De Da Da Da", "Don't Stand So Close to Me", "Every Little Thing She Does is Magic", "Heart Attack", "You're the One That I Want", "Physical", "Kiss on My List", "You Make My Dreams", "Private Eyes", "Defunkitize", "Blue Suede Shoes", "Hound Dog", "Don't Be Cruel", "(Let Me Be Your) Teddy Bear", "Return to Sender", "Gloria", "Stray Cat Strut", "Rock This Town", "Mickey", "Kids in America", "He's So Shy" (revised version only), "I Want to Hold Your Hand", "She Loves You", "Can't Buy Me Love", "Beat It", "Rock with You", "Off the Wall", "Shake Your Body (Down to the Ground)", "Jessie's Girl", "Heartbreaker", "I've Done Everything for You", "Hit Me with Your Best Shot", "Don't Talk to Strangers", "Kids Incorporated", "Holding Out for a Hero" (revised version only).	September 1, 1983	1985 (on VHS)

== Episodes ==
=== Season 1 (1984) ===
The first season aired in syndication in 1984, and is the only season to feature Jerry Sharell. He left "Kids Incorporated" after Season 1 due to being unhappy with the show’s often bizarre and outlandish story lines.

Cast
- Stacy Ferguson
- Marta Marrero
- Rahsaan Patterson
- Renee Sands
- Jerry Sharell
- Moosie Drier

Dancers

- Wendy Brainard
- Aaron Hamilton
- Mario Lopez
- Carletta Price (episodes 14-26)
- Shanice Wilson (episodes 1-13)
- Andrea Paige Wilson

Episodes

Title	Episode #	Writers	Directors	Summary	Airdate
"Leader of the Pack"	1			When Mickey has a power trip, the rest of the band quits and wonders if they should hook up with the new rich kid (played by Christian Hoff). Songs: "Jump", "The Heart of Rock & Roll", "Beat It", "Against All Odds (Take a Look at Me Now)", "Breakin'... There's No Stopping Us"	September 1, 1984
"The Painter"	2	Marc B. Ray & John Boni	Maurice Abraham	The band finds out that someone has been vandalizing the neighborhood and try to catch the culprit for a $100 reward. Songs: "Dynamite", "The Warrior", "I Can Dream About You", "Jump (For My Love)"	September 4, 1984
"The Angels"	3			Gloria wants to join an all girl's club called The Angels. Songs: "Cover Me", "You Might Think", "Drive", "I'm So Excited"	September 11, 1984
"The Bully"	4	Marc B. Ray & John Boni	Maurice Abraham	The Kid makes fun of a bully (Trevor Weaver) and has to run for it when the bully demands to face him. Songs: "Sunglasses at Night", "We're Not Gonna Take It", "Holding Out for a Hero", "Let's Hear It for the Boy"	September 26, 1984
"The Joker"	5			A practical joker comes to the P*lace and tries to be friends with Kids Inc. Jeff Cohen guest stars. Songs: "Cruel Summer", "Baby I'm a Star", "Easy to Be Hard", "Right by Your Side" "Bop 'Til You Drop"	October 5, 1984
"The Basket Case"	6			Renee trades places with a runaway princess and learns that it's not the life she'd thought it was. Katie Barberi guest stars. Songs: "ABC", "The Glamorous Life", "The Lucky One", "Girls Just Want to Have Fun", "All Night Long (All Night)"	October 16, 1984
"The Ghost of the P*lace"	7	Marc B. Ray & John Boni	Maurice Abraham	Stacy becomes friends with a ghost and helps him get into a ghost society. Songs: "Don't Fight It", "Go Insane", "When I'm All Alone", "Ghostbusters", "Let's Go Crazy"	October 23, 1984
"New Image"	8			Mickey attempts to rebrand Kids Inc. Songs: "Who Wears these Shoes?", "Lucky Star", "Heavy Metal Madness", "Bet Your Life It's Me", "Missing You", "Wake Me Up Before You Go-Go" Note: "Bet Your Life It's Me" is the first of three songs (along with "That's Dancin'" and "In That Dream") shared by both Kids Incorporated and the series version of "Fame"; both MGM co-produced series at the time.	October 29, 1984
"Go for the Gold"	9			When Kids Inc.'s amp blows up, Stacy tries to win money through a gymnastics competition to buy a new one. Guest appearance by U.S. Olympic gymnast Kathy Johnson. Songs: "Physical", "Cool Places", "I'll Tumble 4 Ya", "Go for It", "Maniac"	November 4, 1984
"Robot Bop"	10			A robot is sent to take Riley's place. Richard Steven Horvitz guest stars. Songs: "The War Song", "Dancing in the Dark", "Freak-A-Zoid", "Human Touch", "Mr. Roboto"	November 7, 1984
"Space Case"	11			An alien comes to study Earth for a school project and decides to take Renee back as his specimen. First of two consecutive appearances for John Franklin. Songs: Old Time Rock and Roll", "I Just Called to Say I Love You", "You Keep Me Hangin' On", "Never Can Say Goodbye", "Footloose"	November 17, 1984
"The Leprechaun"	12	Marc B. Ray & Ron Bastone	Maurice Abraham	A leprechaun ends up at the P*lace and convinces The Kid and Stacy to teach him how to be a rock and roll star. Second of two consecutive appearances for John Franklin. Songs: "I Want You Back", "Say It Isn't So", "Stuck on You", "Fame", "Last Dance"	November 18, 1984
"X Marks The Spot"	13	Marc B. Ray & Ron Bastone	Maurice Abraham	Gloria, Mickey, The Kid, and Stacy secretly plan a treasure hunt for Renee's birthday. Songs: "Love Somebody", "Time After Time", "Treasure Hunt", "Celebration"	November 19, 1984
"Funny Money"	14			The Kid finds a briefcase full of counterfeit money; when he returns it to the owner, he finds himself wanted by the police. Songs: "I Do' Wanna Know", "Fun, Fun, Fun", "Some Guys Have All the Luck", "Trouble", "Vacation"	November 25, 1984
"School's For Fools"	15	Marc B. Ray and John Boni	Gary Halvorson	Exams are coming up, but The Kid refuses to study or take his classes seriously, as he spends his time planning on being a huge star. David Hasselhoff guest stars. Songs: "Teacher, Teacher", "Out of Touch", "Break My Stride", "Do You Love Me", "We Got the Beat"	November 26, 1984
"No Jockos"	16	Marc B. Ray and Bruce Reisman	Jack Regas	The kids throw a carnival, but they must fill in when the clown they hire breaks his leg. Songs: "On the Dark Side", "Magic", "A Million Miles Away", "Be a Clown", "Dancing in the Street"	November 27, 1984
"Superbike"	17			Renee proves that old is better by fixing up an old bike that had been thrown away and giving it to Riley. Songs: "Freedom" "Cool It Now" "It's a Miracle", "The Kid's American", "Shake It Up"	November 28, 1984
"She's So Shy"	18	George McGrath & Lynne Marie Stewart	Jack Regas	When Kids Inc. find out their dancer Wendy has a great voice, they devise a plan to get her to sing on stage with them. Songs: "Shake Your Body (Down to the Ground)", "It Ain't Enough", "She's So Shy", "Dim All the Lights", "Neutron Dance"	December 2, 1984
"The Camp-Out Blues"	19	Marc B. Ray & Andrew Gordon	Maurice Abraham	Mickey, Gloria, Renee, and Stacy try to get Kid to face his fears and go camping with the Boy Scouts. Songs: "Hello Again", "Our Lips Are Sealed", "I'm Not Frightened", "I'm Still Standing", "Freeze Frame"	December 5, 1984
"The Historical P*lace"	20			The kids work to have The P*lace declared a historical building so it won't be torn down. Songs: "Goody Two Shoes", "You Make My Dreams", "We Belong", "Good Old Days", "The Belle of St. Mark"	December 9, 1984
"Dance Palace"	21			The band holds its first annual dance contest. Songs: "(Love Is Like a) Heat Wave", "Billie Jean", "Far from Over"	December 13, 1984
"Her or Me"	22			When Renee and Stacy feud, they demand that the other band members pick sides. Songs: "I Do", "You Should Hear How She Talks About You", "Just Once", "Livin' in Desperate Times", "You Can't Hurry Love"	December 16, 1984
"NASA Space Week"	23			It's Space Week at The P*lace, and all the kids are writing to NASA in hopes of becoming the first kid in space. Gloria, however, is too scared. Songs: "Twist of Fate", "Holiday", "Human Nature", "Wanna Be Startin' Somethin'", "Stand Up"	December 19, 1984
"Basketball Blues"	24			When the boys won't allow Renee to try out for their basketball team because she's a girl, she challenges them to a boys vs. girls basketball game. The boys' mysterious new star player (Moya Kordick), however, helps to make the point. Songs: "I've Done Everything for You", "Head Over Heels", "I Can Do It", "Hit Me with Your Best Shot", "Every Little Thing He Does Is Magic"	December 21, 1984
"Siedah Garrett"	25	Marc B. Ray & John Boni	Gary Halvorson	Mickey and The Kid find out that their favorite singer, Siedah Garrett, is coming to The P*lace to film a video. Songs: "Why Me?", "Don't Talk to Strangers", "Misunderstanding", "Do You Want It Right Now", "Rock This Town"	December 23, 1984
"Civic Day Parade"	26			The kids want to make a float for the Civic Day Parade, but they each want to do a tribute to something different. Songs: "The Tears of a Clown", "You're the One That I Want", "We Can Make It Together", "20/20", "Back in the U.S.A."	December 28, 1984

=== Season 2 (1985) ===
Like the first season, the second season aired in syndication in 1985. Jerry Sherrell left the show, to be replaced by Ryan Lambert. This would be the final season of the syndication era.

Cast

- Stacy Ferguson
- Ryan Lambert
- Martika Marrero
- Rahsaan Patterson
- Renee Sands
- Moosie Drier

Dancers

- Chad Anderson
- Wendy Brainard
- Darren Lee
- Mario Lopez
- Gina Marie Vinaccia
- Andrea Paige Wilson

Episodes

Title	Episode #	Writers	Directors	Summary	Airdate
New Kid in Town	27	Andrew Gordon	Gary Halvorson	When Mickey's family moves, a newcomer named Ryan takes his place. Songs: "Don't You (Forget About Me)", "Stir It Up", "Show Some Respect", "The Search Is Over", "Tough All Over"	September 14, 1985
Dr. Jekyll & Mr. Kid	28	Stanley Ralph Ross	Michael Dimich	Unable to figure out why Ryan likes books so much, The Kid ends up in a Dr. Jekyll and Mr. Hyde-esque dream world in which he ends up a nerd. Songs: "Breakaway", "Message in a Bottle", "Rhythm of the Night", "Don't Judge a Book By Its Cover", "Celebrate Youth"	September 17, 1985
The Wallflower	29	George McGrath	Gary Halvorson	When a guy doesn't ask Gloria to a dance, she assumes it's because he doesn't like her. Songs: "Time is on Our Side", "Why Do Fools Fall in Love", "Everytime You Go Away", "That's Dancing", "Party Train"	September 20, 1985
I Love You Suzanne	30			Ryan becomes smitten with a cousin of Riley named Suzanne (played by Angela Lee (born 1970), before learning she's blind. Songs: "Premonition", "It's the Same Old Song", "Too Late for Goodbyes", "New Attitude", "I Love You, Suzanne"	September 25, 1985
The Big Lie	31	George McGrath	Gary Halvorson	Renee accidentally spreads a rumor about Riley due to a misunderstanding. Songs: "Don't Make Me Sorry", "Good Lovin'", "You're My Friend", "Dead Giveaway", "Over and Over"	October 2, 1985
The Boy From Togo	32	George McGrath	Gary Halvorson	An exchange student arrives from Togo, and the kids attempt to relate with him. Songs: "Middle of the Road", "Karma Chameleon", "Would I Lie to You?", "Say It Again", "Stay with Me Tonight" Note: The alternate title for this episode is "A Stranger in a Strange P*lace."	October 9, 1985
A Pain in the Neck	33	George McGrath	Gary Halvorson	Gloria has to have her tonsils removed. Songs: "Thunder Road", "Jailhouse Rock", "Some Things Are Better Left Unsaid", "That's What Friends Are For"^{[1]}, "Walking on Sunshine"	October 16, 1985
The Abominable Show-Man	34	Stanley Ralph Ross	Gary Halvorson	When a fast-talking con artist offers a chance at stardom for Gloria, it ends up going to her head. Songs: "Sussudio", "Bad, Bad Trouble", "Wrapped Around Your Finger", "Running with the Night", "Last Train to Clarksville"	October 22, 1985
One Glass Slipper	35			Feeling left out because she's the youngest member of the band, Stacy has a Cinderella-inspired dream sequence in which she becomes "Stacyrella". Songs: "Souls", "Come See About Me", "Material Girl", "The Greatest Love of All", "Change"	October 29, 1985
The Masked Mauler	36			The Kid goes up against a wrestler nicknamed "The Masked Mauler". Songs: "Angel", "Call Me", "The Heat Is On", "How Did I Wind Up Here", "Music for the Modern World"	November 4, 1985
Peer Pressure	37	Andrew Gordon and Thomas W. Lynch	Michael Dimich	Seeking to not be seen as just a little kid, Stacy is pressured to smoke cigarettes when the singer of an opening act offers a pack. Songs: "I'm Free (Heaven Helps the Man)", "Hungry Heart", "Peer Pressure", "Things Can Only Get Better", "I Can't Help Myself (Sugar Pie Honey Bunch)"	November 9, 1985
Student Government Day	38	George McGrath	Gary Halvorson	The kids fill positions for Student Government Day, and the power goes to The Kid's head. Songs: "Fresh", "Just Got Lucky", "Every Breath You Take", "Some Like It Hot", "Come the Night"	November 13, 1985
Riley's Rival	39	George McGrath	Gary Halvorson	When an old friend of Riley's comes to visit, Riley pretends to be the owner instead of simply a soda jerk. Songs: "Masquerade", "My Guy", "No Lookin' Back", "Never Surrender", "Go Your Own Way"	November 14, 1985
No Rhyme or Reason	40	George McGrath	Gary Halvorson	The Kid and Stacy's mockery of Renee's entry in a poetry contest backfires when she wins a gourmet lunch. Songs: "Freeway of Love", "One Fine Day", "My Special Friend", "It's My Party", "Uptown Girl"	November 18, 1985
Phantom of the P*lace	41	George McGrath	Gary Halvorson	A mysterious series of noises causes the kids to think a phantom is in the P*lace. Songs: "He Could Be the One", "The NeverEnding Story, "Somebody's Watching Me", "Things That Go Bump in the Night", "The Goonies 'R' Good Enough"	November 19, 1985
Grandma, Won't You Dance with Me	42	George McGrath	Gary Halvorson	Ryan is embarrassed when his grandmother Ruth visits. Gwen Verdon guest stars. Songs: "St. Elmo's Fire (Man in Motion)", "Rockin' Robin", "Forever", "It's Only Love", "Someday, Someway"	November 22, 1985
Identical Problems	43	George McGrath	Gary Halvorson	Renee learns that she needs glasses and Stacy gets the hiccups. Songs: "Dangerous", "The Loco-Motion", "Unlucky Me", "You Spin Me Round (Like a Record)", "Into the Groove"	November 23, 1985
Rock of Ages	44			Riley's time machine takes the kids back to see music from the past. Songs: "Only You Know and I Know", "Let's Twist Again", "Blue Suede Shoes", "Time Warp", "Time Machine"	November 24, 1985
The Great Comeback	45	Stanley Ralph Ross	Michael Dimich	The kids meet a once-famous trombone player who is now homeless, and help her reunite with her long-lost daughter. Ruth Buzzi guest stars. Songs: "Don't Lose My Number", "My Girl", "Miracles", "You Can't Get What You Want (Till You Know What You Want)", "People Are People"	November 27, 1985
Classical Case	46	George McGrath	Gary Halvorson	Stacy and Renee's British cousin Samantha (Renee Sands in a dual role) visits, and they all clash over music styles. Songs: "Tell Her About It", "Glory Days", "Agree to Disagree", "One Man Symphony", "It's Still Rock and Roll to Me"	November 30, 1985
Ryan, Ryan P.I.	47	George McGrath	Gary Halvorson	Ryan imagines he is a detective in a 1940s-era film noir. Songs: "Back in My Arms Again", "Wouldn't It Be Good", "Dare Me", "Careless Whisper", "Dance to the Music"	December 2, 1985
A Lad and His Lamp	48			The Kid comes into possession of a magic lamp. Shabba Doo guest stars as the genie. Songs: "Trapped", "Magic", "Leave a Tender Moment Alone", "Bit by Bit (Theme from Fletch)", "We've Got Chemistry",	December 10, 1985
Material Girl	49	Andrew Gordon and Thomas W. Lynch	Michael Dimich	Gloria develops a problem with greed. Songs: "Money (That's What I Want)", "Gambler", "I'm Coming Out", "Possession Obsession", "No More Words"	December 14, 1985
Runaway Stacy	50			Stacy tries to run away from home because her parents won't let her have a pet rabbit. Songs: "All Tied Up", "Games People Play", "Honesty", "Nowhere to Run", "I Believe in Me"	December 17, 1985
Sock Hop	51	George McGrath	Gary Halvorson	The kids hold a sock hop at the P*lace. Songs: "Old Time Rock and Roll", "Back in the U.S.A.", "Rockin' Robin, "They Don't Know", "Dancing in the Street" "It's Still Rock and Roll to Me"	December 20, 1985
Decade of Hits	52	George McGrath	Gary Halvorson	An all-concert episode, primarily focusing on songs of the previous decade. Songs: "(Love Is Like a) Heat Wave", "The Greatest Love of All", "You're the One That I Want", "Let's Go", "Magic", "Celebration", "Gloria", "Maniac", "Beat It", "Dress You Up", "Kids Incorporated"	December 26, 1985

=== Season 3 (1986) ===
The third season premiered on the Disney Channel on November 3, 1986. All of the cast from the previous season returned. Episodes would be aired on weekdays rather than Saturdays. 13 episodes aired in less than a month between November 3 and November 19, 1986 with a New Years' Eve special airing the following month. This was also Martika Marrero and Mario Lopez’s last season on "Kids Incorporated".

Cast
- Stacy Ferguson
- Ryan Lambert
- Martika Marrero
- Rahsaan Patterson
- Renee Sands
- Moosie Drier

Dancers

- Wendy Brainard
- Darren Lee
- Mario Lopez
- Gina Marie Vinaccia
- Andrea Paige Wilson

Episodes

Title	Episode #	Writers	Directors	Summary	Airdate
"O Lucky Me"	53	Lenny Shulman	Michael Dimich	Stacy finds a ring she thinks is bringing her good luck, causing her to panic when she loses it. Songs: "The Heart of Rock & Roll", "Band of Gold", "Round and Round", "Danger Zone", "All I Need is a Miracle"	November 3, 1986
"All in a Night's Work"	54	Andrew Gordon	Michael Dimich	Riley's abrupt exit confuses the kids, who decide to investigate. Songs: "Sidewalk Talk", "Rock Around the Clock", "It's a Mystery", "Secret", "No Lookin' Back"	November 4, 1986
"Crush on You"	55	Jan Silver	Michael Dimich	Renee struggles to tell a guy she likes him. Songs: "Give Me a Shot", "Crush on You", "There'll Be Sad Songs (To Make You Cry)", "How Will I Know", "You Can't Hurry Love"	November 5, 1986
"Help Wanted (Help!)"	56	Lenny Shulman	Jules Lichtman	Short on cash due to a cut in her allowance, Gloria applies for a job at the P*lace. Songs: "The Heat Is On", "Nothin' At All", "If She Knew What She Wants", "She Works Hard for the Money", "Another Night"	November 6, 1986
"World Traveler"	57	Lenny Shulman	Jules Lichtman	A self-styled "world traveler" thrills the kids with his wild tales... until it's revealed he's really a runaway. Songs: "You Belong to the City", "I Like the Weekends", "Who's Johnny", "Never", "If You Leave"	November 7, 1986
"Riley Gets Stung"	58	Lenny Shulman	Gary Halvorson	Hoping to have success as an inventor, Riley instead gets sucked in by a con man (Rip Taylor). Songs: "Who's Zoomin' Who", "Singing Machine", "That's What Friends Are For", "We Built This City", "Restless"	November 10, 1986
"All's Well That Ends Well"	59	Lenny Shulman	Gary Halvorson	Renee and Stacy's cousin Samantha (again played by Renee Sands in a dual role) returns, this time setting her sights on teaching the kids various plays from William Shakespeare. Songs: "America", "Tonight She Comes", "On My Own", "All's Well That Ends Well", "Living in America"	November 11, 1986
"Boy Wonder"	60	Lenny Shulman	Gary Halvorson	When The Kid's ego runs away with him, he tells the others they'd make great backup singers. Songs: "King for a Day", "Don't Fight It", "A Genius", "In My Own Way", "20/20"	November 12, 1986
"The Gift"	61	George McGrath	Gary Halvorson	Renee and Stacy try to find the perfect birthday present for each other. Songs: "And We Danced", "Mad About You", "You're a Friend of Mine", "If I Could", "Stir It Up"	November 13, 1986
"Rockin' Saddles"	62	Lenny Shulman	Jules Lichtman	Brendan Roberts is back, this time offering to sell the Kid answers to an upcoming test. Songs: "R.O.C.K. in the U.S.A.", "I'll Show Them", "Don't Make Me Sorry", "No One Is to Blame", "Goodbye to You"	November 14, 1986
"Peter Pam"	63	Lenny Shulman	Jules Lichtman	Upset about no longer being the baby now that her mother is pregnant, Stacy daydreams that she is "Peter Pam". Songs: "Neutron Dance", "Move Away", "Yo Ho Ho", "Take Me Home", "Back in Time"	November 17, 1986
"With a Twinkle in His Eye"	64	Andrew Gordon	Micharl Dimich	The kids bicker among themselves after an amplifier blows. The gang meets a mysterious man known only as Mr. Angel. Barney Martin guest stars. Songs: "What Have You Done for Me Lately", "Manic Monday", "Reach Out for That Star", "When the Going Gets Tough (The Tough Get Going)", "(The Angels Wanna Wear My) Red Shoes"	November 18, 1986
"Stacy and the Clown"	65	Andrew Gordon	Michael Dimich	The kids hold a special clown contest after Stacy meets a handicapped clown. Songs: "Conga", "Rock This Town", "Say You, Say Me", "Walking on Sunshine", "Celebrating You"	November 19, 1986
"Rock in the New Year"	Special	Lenny Shulman	Michael Dimich	The kids are forced to make last-minute changes for their New Year's celebration after Riley's latest invention blows up and sends ice cream throughout the P*lace. The episode is a clip show, featuring performances from this and the previous season. Songs: "Wild Wild Life", "Wanna Be Startin' Somethin'", "Show Some Respect", "Tough All Over", "It's My Party", "I'm Coming Out", "Some Things Are Better Left Unsaid", "That's What Friends are For"^{[1]}, "Miracles", "You Can't Get What You Want (Till You Know What You Want)", "That's What Friends Are For", "Step by Step", "Everybody Have Fun Tonight", "Dancing on the Ceiling", "Auld Lang Syne"/"Tomorrow Morning (A Brand New World)"	December 31, 1986

=== Season 4 (1987) ===
Martika left the show prior to the fourth season to pursue her new career in music; she was replaced by Connie Lew. Mario Lopez left "Kids Incorporated" after Season 3 ended (and eventually went on to star on Saved by the Bell), and Richard Shoff replaced Lopez as the group's new drummer. Unlike his predecessor, Richard was made one of the main cast, expanding the group from five to six members. This was the final season for Renee Sands and Rahsaan Patterson.

Cast

- Stacey Ferguson
- Ryan Lambert
- Connie Lew
- Rahsaan Patterson
- Renee Sands
- Richard Shoff
- Moosie Drier

Dancers

- Dee Caspary
- Nicole Cropper
- Angella Kaye
- Challyn Markray
- Brian Poth
- Gina Marie Vinaccia

Title	Episode #	Writers	Directors	Summary	Airdate
"A Kid's Line"	66	Lenny Shulman	Michael Dimich	The kids scramble to find a replacement for Gloria following her acceptance at a distant music school. Connie and Richie eventually join Kids Incorporated. Richie's family have just moved to town. This allows the gang to get a new drummer to replace Mario. Songs: "Rhyme & Reason", "Bit by Bit (Theme from Fletch)", "Wrong for the Part", "True Blue", "I Will Be There"	September 7, 1987
"Modern Music"	67	Lenny Shulman	Michael Dimich	Riley's latest invention, a Max Headroom-like synthesizer, goes amok and nearly ruins things for the kids. Songs: "Music for the Modern World", "Jump Start", "I Am the Beat", "Shakedown", "Mind Over Matter",	September 8, 1987
"Video Madness"	68	Jan Silver	Michael Dimich	Richie tries to produce a video project for his class, but his efforts are nearly ruined by the others' bickering. Songs: "Let's Go!", "Time for a Change", "Some Guys Have All the Luck", "It's Not Over ('Til It's Over)", "Nothing's Gonna Stop Us Now"	September 9, 1987
"Front Page News"	69	Andrew Gordon	Sandi Fullerton	Renee and Ryan compete for the open position of editor of the school newspaper. Songs: "Point of No Return", "We Got the Beat", "Who, What, When, Where, and Why", "I Know", "Livin' on a Prayer"	September 10, 1987
"Trouble's Cooking"	70	Lenny Shulman	Michael Dimich	The Kid and Stacy dispute over who should get the $100 prize for purchasing what turns out to be the 1,000th chocolate malt sold at the P*lace. Songs: "Flames of Paradise", "You Keep Me Hangin' On", "Don't Dream It's Over", "Two Sides to Every Story", "Love Will Save the Day"	September 11, 1987
"The Boy Who Cried Gorilla"	71	Howard Burkons and Blake Snyder	Sandi Fullerton	Richie's penchant for exaggeration causes the others not to believe him when he actually sees a gorilla. Songs: "I Heard a Rumour", "Would I Lie to You?", "In Too Deep", "Rhythm Is Gonna Get You", "Twistin' the Night Away"	September 14, 1987
"You've Got the Wrong Date"	72	Jan Silver	Michael Dimich	Stacy's attempt to ask a guy she likes to take her out to their school's Sadie Hawkins Day dance ends up with the guy thinking Renee wants to go with him. Ryan Bollman guest stars as Jason. Songs: "Cross My Broken Heart", "In That Dream", "Time After Time", "I Wanna Dance with Somebody (Who Loves Me)", "Right on Track"	September 15, 1987
"Russian 101"	73	Jan Silver and Ted Hardwick	Michael Dimich	Ryan develops a crush on a Russian ballet dancer. Songs: "I Knew You Were Waiting (For Me)", "Come Go with Me", "I Can Dream About You", "That's America", "One for the Mockingbird"	September 16, 1987
"When Movies Were Movies"	74	Howard Burkons and Blake Snyder	Michael Dimich	With an afternoon off, the kids attempt to pick a movie to see. Songs: "Come as You Are", "I'm Still Standing", "Forever (Like Heroes and Fools)", "When Movies Were Movies", "The Finer Things"	September 17, 1987
"Now Appearing"	75	Andrew Gordon	Gary Halvorson	The kids are catch a show featuring a comedian named Billy Blaster, who turns out to be The Kid's estranged brother. Earth, Wind & Fire's Philip Bailey guest stars. Songs: "Open Your Heart", "Back in My Arms Again", "True Colors", "Love Is a Contact Sport", "Never Say Never"	September 18, 1987
"Win a Date with Renee"	76	Andrew Gordon	Gary Halvorson	Richie comes up with his next get-rich-quick scheme in raffling a date with Renee. Head of the Class star Brian Robbins guest stars. Songs: "Who's That Girl", "One Fine Day", "If I Say Yes", "I'm Only Human", "Only in My Dreams"	October 4, 1987
"Connie in Wonderland"	77	Lenny Shulman	Gary Halvorson	Connie gets on a healthy food and exercise kick. When none of the others show interest, she imagines herself in the story of Alice's Adventures in Wonderland. Songs: "Where's the Party", "I'll Tumble 4 Ya", "Twinkle, Twinkle", "Dominoes", "Never Enough"	October 5, 1987
"What's In a Name"	78	Michael Rudin	Sandi Fullerton	A new flavor of ice cream on the P*lace menu is set to be named after a band member. This leads the other band members to realize they don't know The Kid's given name. Songs: "The Kid's American", "Walk Like an Egyptian", "Wot's It to Ya", "Sweet Freedom", "Something So Strong"	October 6, 1987

=== Season 5 (1988) ===
Rahsaan Patterson and Renee Sands left the show prior to the fifth season, leaving Stacy Ferguson as the last remaining original band member. Added to the cast this season were Kenny Ford and Devyn Puett replacing Rahsaan Patterson and Renee Sands. This was the final season to feature Ryan Lambert, Connie Lew, and Moosie Drier.

Cast

- Stacy Ferguson
- Kenny Ford
- Ryan Lambert
- Connie Lew
- Devyn Puett
- Richard Shoff
- Moosie Drier

'

Dancers

- Dee Caspary
- Nicole Cropper
- Kimberly Duncan
- Brian Poth
- Gina Marie Vinaccia

Title	Episode #	Directors	Summary	Airdate
"The Pick-Ups"	79	Tom Trbovich	Renee moves to England to live with Samantha for a year and the Kid is accepted into a foreign exchange student program. Kids Incorporated searches for their replacements. The gang allows Kenny and Devyn to join the band. Songs: "So Emotional", "Get Outta My Dreams, Get into My Car", "There's No Stopping Me", "Here to Stay", "Who Found Who"	November 22, 1988
"Kid's Court"	80	Jeff Margolis	A dispute between Connie and Devyn over who wrote a particular song threatens to destroy their friendship. Songs: "Stop! In the Name of Love", "Faith", "Who Wrote the Song", "Seasons Change", "It's the Same Old Song""	November 24, 1988
"The Kid's New Clothes"	81	Tom Trbovich	The kids learn that a fashion designer has an idea for new costumes for the band, only to be less than enthused by the finished product. Songs: "Out of the Blue", "Pink Cadillac", "One of a Kind", "Bad", "Seven Wonders"	November 28, 1988
"The Talent Search"	82	Tom Trbovich	The kids audition for a role in a movie. Songs: "La Bamba", "Expressway to Your Heart", "In My Dreams", "I Can Be What You Want Me to Be", "Mony Mony"	November 30, 1988
"You Don't Say"	83	Tom Trbovich	Ryan lands in hot water with the school principal (guest star Alaina Reed Hall) following a bad review of the cafeteria food. Songs: "Here I Go Again", "Pop Goes the World", "Got to Be True to Myself", "Think", "Check It Out"	December 2, 1988
"Kahuna Kids"	84	Moosie Drier	When the air conditioning quits in the P*lace, the kids relax by traveling to The Shell Shack — a beach restaurant, shop, carnival, or amusement park run by a cousin of Riley's — only to learn it's set to be torn down for a garbage disposal plant. Songs: "(Love Is Like a) Heat Wave", "Fun, Fun, Fun", "Summer Days", "Circle in the Sand", "Surfin' U.S.A."	December 4, 1988
"Richie for President"	85	Tom Trbovich	Richie enters a tough battle for class president. Audra Lee guest stars. Songs: "Who Will You Run To", "Say You Will", "Got My Mind Set on You", "Stick to It", "Stand by Me"	December 8, 1988
"The Guitarist"	86	Jeff Margolis	While their guitarist is out of town, the kids audition a replacement guitar player who they learn later is disabled. Songs: "Help!", "I Think We're Alone Now", "Love Will Save the Day", "With or Without You", "Man in the Mirror"	December 10, 1988
"When the Clock Strikes Twelve"	87	Jeff Margolis	Ryan makes the baseball team, but his good fortune is quickly overshadowed by the bully angered at getting beaten out. Songs: "Shake Your Love", "Catch Me (I'm Falling)", "I Need Help", "We Can Work It Out", "I Saw Him Standing There"	December 12, 1988
"The Frog Prince"	88	Tom Trbovich	Stacy is hesitant to invite a nerdy guy to her birthday, but changes her mind after daydreaming her way into an adaptation of The Frog Prince fairy tale. Jason Hervey guest stars as Ethan. Songs: "Lost in Emotion", "How Can I Forget You", "I Get Weak", "You Can't Judge a Book By Its Cover", "Prove Your Love"	December 14, 1988
"The Open Book"	89	Tom Trbovich	The kids read a paper Stacy wrote for an English assignment and conclude she is threatening to run away. Songs: "Never Gonna Give You Up", "Paperback Writer", "Time for a Friend", "Strange But True", "Cherry Bomb"	December 19, 1988
"Richie in Love"	90	Tom Trbovich	Richie develops a crush on Riley's college-aged cousin. Songs: "Tell It to My Heart", "Heartache", "Is This Love", "Flames of Paradise", "Someday We'll Be Together"	December 23, 1988
"Constellation Connie"	91	Tom Trbovich	Connie attempts to invent a time machine, but drags an alien to Earth instead. Songs: "Crocodile Rock", "Music for the Modern World", "Try the Best You Can", "Another Part of Me", "Heaven Is a Place on Earth"	December 28, 1988

=== Season 6 (1989) ===
Ryan Lambert, Connie Lew, and Moosie Drier departed the cast and were replaced by Jennifer Love Hewitt (then known as Love Hewitt) and Sean O'Riordan as The P*lace's new owner (named Flip). This is the final season to feature Stacy Ferguson, Devyn Puett, and Richard Shoff. The group was contracted back down to five members for the first time since season 3. For this season, and this season only, episodes would not be broadcast on Fridays. Instead, episodes would air Monday through Thursday only, with new episodes airing on Monday, and reruns of older episodes airing on Tuesdays, Wednesdays and Thursdays.

Cast

- Stacy Ferguson
- Kenny Ford
- (Jennifer) Love Hewitt
- Devyn Puett
- Richard Shoff
- Sean O'Riordan

Dancers

- Joseph Conrad
- Kimberly Duncan
- Leilani Lagmay
- Angella Kaye
- Tiffany Robbins
- Cory Tyler

Episodes

Title	Episode #	Writers	Directors	Summary	Airdate
"Sweet Dreams"	92	Lenny Shulman	Marty Pasetta Jr.	Ryan and Connie are gone. Robin has recently joined Kids Incorporated. Riley has left for college and the kids begin worrying about The P*lace's future. Songs: "Edge of a Broken Heart", "Love Me Do" (The Beatles), "Dreamin'", "Don't Take Away My Past", "The Doctor"	November 27, 1989
"The Storybook House"	93	Thomas W. Lynch and Blake Snyder	Michael Dimich	Little Red Riding Hood shows up at the P*lace, and the kids help her find her way home. Ruth Buzzi makes her second guest appearance. Songs: "Two Hearts", "Walk on Water", "Someone Who Believes in You", "You're Not King Kong", "Dancing with Myself"	November 28, 1989
"The Hero"	94	Blake Snyder	Thomas W. Lynch	Devyn gets a fan club of her own and develops a massive ego as a result. Audra Lee makes her second guest appearance. Songs: "New Sensation", "I'm into Something Good", "She's a Star", "Wind Beneath My Wings", "Indestructible" NOTE: "Indestructible" was co-written by Bobby Sandstrom, brother of former Kids Incorporated cast member Renee Sands.	November 29, 1989
"Career Jeers"	95	Lenny Shulman	Greg V. Fera	Stacy frets over a career aptitude test. Songs: "Cross My Heart", "Don't Rush Me", "One Moment in Time", "Somebody Tell Me Why", "All Fired Up"	December 8, 1989
"Never Too Old"	96	Tina Seiler	Marty Pasetta Jr.	Stacy's grandfather has to move into a retirement home. Stacy is heartbroken and the gang tries to cheer her up. Songs: "I Only Want to Be with You", "From Me to You" (The Beatles), "We're Old", "All This Time", "More Than You Know (Martika song)" NOTE: This is the first time Kids Incorporated covers a hit from a former cast member. ("More Than You Know" by Martika.)	December 9, 1989
"Pollution Problems"	97	Lenny Shulman	Greg V. Fera	The kids rally to protest water pollution. Bill Rafferty guest stars. Songs: "Iko Iko", "The Loco-Motion", "All You Need Is Love" (The Beatles), "Hand in Hand", "The Way You Do the Things You Do"	December 10, 1989
"Roughing It"	98	Lenny Shulman	Gary Halvorson	The kids go on a camping trip, and run across a young homeless man. Songs: "Satisfied", "Room to Move", "The Sun Rises", "You've Got a Friend", "Through the Storm"	December 14, 1989
"The Cover-Up"	99	Lou Chagrais and Lenny Shulman	Thomas W. Lynch	In this very special episode, the kids befriend a kid who is dealing with physical abuse. Songs: "Sayin' Sorry (Don't Make It Right)", "Don't Tell Me Lies", "The Rap", "Lean on Me", "The Living Years"	December 15, 1989
"Play It Again, Kids Inc."	100	Lenny Shulman	Gary Halvorson	The kids are excited to go to a Debbie Gibson concert, until Flip accidentally loses the tickets. Songs: "Your Mama Don't Dance", "All Geared Up", "As Time Goes By", "Smooth Criminal", "Takin' Care of Business""	December 16, 1989
"Magic Toy Shoppe"	101	Blake Snyder	Thomas W. Lynch	The kids learn of a toy drive to help a local orphanage, while Robin imagines herself in the story of a princess and a toy soldier. Songs: "True Love is Hard to Find", "Symptoms of True Love", "I Still Believe", "Soldier of Love", "Waiting for a Star to Fall"	December 20, 1989
"Clique, Clique"	102	Lenny Shulman	Michael Dimich	Richie feels pressure to join a gang in order to hang with some "cool guys". Boxer Ray Mancini guest stars. Songs: "Walk the Dinosaur", "Dial My Heart", "How Do You Help a Friend", "What You Don't Know", "Don't Look Back"	December 21, 1989
"Further Adventures of Cosmoboy"	103	Blake Snyder	Marty Pasetta Jr.	Kenny pretends to be a superhero named "Cosmoboy". Songs: "Knocked Out", "Hit the Road Jack", "Be Who You Are", "My Prerogative", "Stand Back"	December 22, 1989
"Stop the Presses"	104	Robert Harris Duncan	Gary Halvorson	Kenny exaggerates others' stories to sell more newspapers. Songs: "Do You Believe in Magic", "Don't Be Cruel", "Leave Me Alone", "I Know I Can Turn It All Around", "Forever Your Girl"	December 27, 1989
"Elementary My Dear Kids"	105	Walter Eric Jacobson	Greg V. Fera	The kids search for a missing bracelet. Heather Tom guest stars. Songs: "Straight Up", "Can't Buy Me Love", "Trust is What Friendship is All About", "Workin' Overtime", "Put a Little Love in Your Heart"	December 28, 1989
"Karate Kids"	106	David Mirsky	Michael Dimich	When Robin faces trouble with a bully, she enlists in a karate class. Billy Blanks guest stars. Songs: "This Time I Know It's for Real", "Hold On", "Don't Give Up", "Livin' Right", "Every Little Step"	December 29, 1989

=== Season 7 (1991) ===
The series resumed production after a year hiatus in 1990, but many of the cast members - Richard Shoff, Devyn Puett, and the only remaining original cast member Stacy Ferguson - had moved on to other projects by then, however Kenny Ford, Jennifer Love Hewitt, and Sean O'Riordan all returned. New additions to the cast this season were Eric Balfour, Anastasia Horne, and Haylie Johnson. This was Jennifer Love Hewitt's final season on "Kids Incorporated" and the only season to feature Eric Balfour. The series would return to its original Monday through Friday line-up. Season 7 made its official debut on November 4, 1991 and ended on November 29, 1991.

Cast

- Eric Balfour
- Kenny Ford
- (Jennifer) Love Hewitt
- Anastasia Horne
- Haylie Johnson
- Sean O'Riordan

Dancers

- Charon Aldredge
- Brian Friedman
- Jennifer King
- Danielle Marcus-Janssen
- Anthony "Tony" Perrin
- Angella Kaye

Title	Episode #	Writers	Directors	Summary	Airdate
"A Hard Date's Night"	107	Lenny Shulman	Greg V. Fera	Stacy, Devyn and Richie have left the band. They are replaced by Haylie, Ana and Eric. Eric, noticing how some girls are paying attention to him, decides to date three of them at once. Songs: "Romeo", "The Shoop Shoop Song (It's in His Kiss)", "It's the Right Time", "Heat of the Moment", "King of Wishful Thinking" Note: The episode's title is a parody of The Beatles song "A Hard Day's Night"	November 4, 1991
"P*lace Alone"	108	Curt Brunk	Michael Dimich	Attempting to prove they're "grown up"; Haylie and Robin try to protect the P*lace from a burglar. Songs: "Get Up! (Before the Night Is Over)", "Release Me", "I Can Do Anything", "The Power", "Save Me"	November 5, 1991
"Teen Spotlight"	109	Lenny Shulman	Greg V. Fera	Kids Incorporated is featured in a segment on a teen-oriented show. Songs: "I'm Breaking Free", "Do You Love Me", "If Wishes Came True", "Friends", "I'll Be Good to You"	November 6, 1991
"Thirteensomething"	110	Elaine Overbey Landau	Michael Dimich	A girl named Cynthia visits; and Kenny attempts to impress her. Songs: "The Book of Love", "Another Day in Paradise", "Don't Wanna Lose You", "Something Happened on the Way to Heaven", "High Enough" Note: The episode's title is a parody of Thirtysomething, a television series that had just completed its run a few months before this episode aired.	November 7, 1991
"Pipe Dreams"	111	Elaine Overbey Landau	Michael Dimich	The kids get excited about an upcoming concert until Haylie accidentally loses the tickets. Ken Page guest stars. Songs: "U Can't Touch This", "How Can We Be Friends", "Give a Little Love", "Follow it Around", "Voices That Care"	November 8, 1991
"History in the Making"	112	Lenny Shulman	Greg V. Fera	Eric is having trouble in his history class. If Eric's grades don't improve, he's grounded and will have to quit the band. Songs: "Don't You Want to Be Mine", "Mercy Mercy Me (The Ecology)", "Two to Make It Right", "History", "I'll Be Your Shelter"	November 11, 1991
"Family Matters"	113	Elaine Overbey Landau	Michael Dimich	Ana's attempts to outdo Robin causes a rift between the two cousins. Songs: "Jealous Again", "You Can't Deny It", "Don't Treat Me Bad", "If You Don't Know Me By Now", "You're the One"	November 12, 1991
"New Twist"	114	Elaine Overbey Landau	Michael Dimich	The annual tongue-twister contest is approaching at Robin's school; and her classmates name her the school's representative. Songs: "Can't Stop", "Hold On", "I Can Fly", "Get On Your Feet", "Forever Young"	November 13, 1991
"Breaking Up is Hard to Do"	115	Ken Lipman	David Grossman	Ana's father comes to town on business; and Ana feels neglected when he doesn't spend much time with her. Ana believes that her parents are getting back together. Robin tries to warn her cousin that she's getting her hopes up. Ana eventually realizes that Robin was right. Songs: "Pump Up the Jam", "This Old Heart of Mine (Is Weak for You)", "If You Asked Me To", "Real Love", "Don't Ever Go" Note: Barry Williams guest stars as Ana's father. He previously starred as Greg Brady on The Brady Bunch. This was the first time that a former star from The Brady Bunch was on Kids Incorporated. In Season 8, Florence Henderson, who previously was Carol Brady, appeared in the episode "We Love Granny".	November 14, 1991
"Flip Out"	116	Elaine Overbey Landau	Michael Dimich	When Flip's sneaker fortune runs out; a financial advisor (played by guest star Karla DeVito) suggests making the P*lace a tea room for adults. Songs: "Club at the End of the Street", "(Can't Live Without Your) Love and Affection", "Cry for Help", "Fairweather Friend", "This House"	November 15, 1991
"Music Lessons"	117	Elaine Overbey Landau	Michael Dimich	Kenny attempts to cope with the sudden death of his music teacher. Songs: "Miss You Much", "Dancing Machine", "Power of Love/Love Power", "How Can I Go On", "Tomorrow"	November 18, 1991
"While the Cat's Away"	118	Elaine Overbey Landau	Michael Dimich	An urgent meeting forces Flip to leave Kenny and Eric in charge. Songs: "Step by Step", "Let the Good Times Roll", "Here We Go (Let's Rock & Roll)", "All Play and No Work", "Rhythm of My Heart"	November 19, 1991
"Tall Order"	119	Lenny Shulman	Greg V. Fera	Haylie becomes self-conscious about being the shortest member of the band. Guest appearance by Mandy Carr and Randy Lathrop. Songs: "Gonna Make You Sweat (Everybody Dance Now)", "Little Darlin'", "When I'm Back on My Feet Again", "Wild Child", "Follow Your Dream"	November 20, 1991
"My Fair Ana"	120	Elaine Overbey Landau	Michael Dimich	Ana develops a crush on a boy (guest star R.J. Williams) she has math class with. Songs: "The Girl I Used to Know", "The Great Pretender", "You Need a New Attitude", "Individuality", "Waiting for Love"	November 21, 1991
"Five Kids and a Dog"	121	Elaine Overbey Landau	Michael Dimich	Ana takes in a stray dog. Guest appearance by Paul Benvenuti and Foster (as the dog). Songs: "We'll Be Rockin'", "Cherish", "Walkin' the Dog", "Everything", "Downtown Train"	November 22, 1991
"Mummy Dearest"	122	Blake Snyder	David Grossman	A mix-up in a delivery leads to a mummy being sent to the P*lace. Songs: "Where There's a Will", "Boris the Spider", "Coming Out of the Dark", "Call It Superstition", "If I Could Turn Back Time"	November 25, 1991
"Double Trouble"	123	Elaine Overbey Landau	Michael Dimich	The kids meet a fun-loving kid new in town and his twin brother. Scott Wolf (credited as Scott Tyler Wolf) guest stars as Billy and Bobby. Songs: "Feels Good", "Lollipop", "How Can We Be Friends", "All Around the World", "Swear to Your Heart"	November 26, 1991
"Earth Day Festival"	124	Elaine Overbey Landau	Michael Dimich	The kids hold a special festival for Earth Day. Songs: "After the Rain", "Yakety Yak", "Please Save Us the World", "This is the Right Time", "Save the Trees"; Note: "Please Save Us the World" would later become the only Kids Incorporated original to appear on a cast member's album when it appeared in Jennifer Love Hewitt's debut album Love Songs; Note: The three original songs are the most to appear in a single episode.	November 27, 1991
"That's What Friends Are For"	125	Elaine Overbey Landau	Michael Dimich	Robin tries to help her friend Becky (played by Natasha Pearce) overcome her shyness. Songs: "Open Your Eyes", "Big Girls Don't Cry", "Games", "Hold On", "When I See You Smile"; Note: The episode's title is a reference to the song "That's What Friends Are For".	November 28, 1991
"Secret Agent Girl"	126	Elaine Overbey Landau	Michael Dimich	Haylie gets a spy kit, but when she mistakes a comment the others made about getting rid of a doll and thinks they're talking about her, she threatens to quit. Songs: "Get Ready", "Impulsive", "Read My Mind", "Lies", "More Than Ever"; Note: This episode is sometimes called "The Spy Kit". "Secret Agent Girl", the episode's title is a parody of the song Secret Agent Man.	November 29, 1991

=== Season 8 (1992) ===
Most of the cast from the previous season returned, with the exception of Jennifer Love Hewitt and Eric Balfour. Added to the cast in the 8th season were Jared Delgin and Nicole Brown. This would be the final season for Kenny Ford and Sean O'Riordan and this was also the only season to feature Jared Delgin.

Cast

- Nicole Brown
- Jared Delgin
- Kenny Ford
- Anastasia Horne
- Haylie Johnson
- Sean O'Riordan

Dancers

- Charon Aldredge
- Brian Friedman
- Jennifer King
- Danielle Marcus-Janssen
- Tony Perrin

	Title	Episode #	Writers	Directors	Summary	Airdate
"(Jared for) President"	127	Ken Lipman	Michael Dimich	With Robin gone and Eric's family moving away, Nicole and Jared take their places in the band. After moving to town Jared decides to run for class president to meet new people. Songs: "Can't Stop the Bum Rush", "Tell Him", "I'm So Cool", "Who Do You Love", "Rock House"	September 21, 1992	
"The Show"	128	Gary Stein and Sam Ingraffia	Michael Dimich	The PTA is putting on a show; and Ana is named student advisor only to run into difficulties from the PTA director (guest star Edie Adams). Songs: "Music for the People", "You Make Me Crazy", "We Haven't Finished Yet", "Vibeology", "Good for Me"	September 22, 1992	
"Lay Off"	129	Ken Lipman	Michael Dimich	The kids are invited to a birthday party, only for the party to be canceled following the hostess' father being laid off. Late actress Brittany Murphy guest stars. Songs: "Money Don't Matter 2 Night", "The Best Things in Life Are Free", "Round and Round", "I'll Be There", "This Generation"	September 23, 1992	
"We Love Granny"	130	Blake Snyder	Robby Benson	Jared's grandmother comes for a visit. Jared is embarrassed when she treats him like a little kid. Songs: "Ain't Gonna Hurt Nobody", "I Love Your Smile", "Fa-Fa-Fa-Fa-Fa (Sad Song)", "Good Vibrations", "Everything Changes"; Note: This marks the first cover of a song produced by another Kids Incorporated alumna, Shanice Wilson; who served as a dancer during the series' first season in 1984. Florence Henderson guest stars as Jared's grandmother. She previously starred as Carol Brady on The Brady Bunch. This was the second time that a former star from The Brady Bunch was on Kids Incorporated. Barry Williams, Florence Henderson's television son previously in the Season 7 episode "Breaking Up Is Hard to Do".	September 24, 1992	
"Kenny's Sister"	131	Ken Lipman	Robby Benson	Kenny's older sister Ellen (guest star Rain Pryor) comes to visit; and Kenny feels a need to compete with her academically. Songs: "Bouncin'", "Pretty Little Angel Eyes", "Can't Forget You", "Live and Learn", "That's What Love is For"	September 25, 1992	
"Mystery, She Wrote"	132	Ted Alben and Greg Klein	Robby Benson	Ana runs into difficulty with writing a mystery for an English class. Songs: "Who, Where, Why", "Too Many Fish in the Sea", "Tell Me When", "The Mystery of You", "Right Here, Right Now"	September 28, 1992	
"The Joke's On Us"	133			The kids miss an opportunity to see the taping of comedian Paul Rodriguez. Songs: "Running Back to You", "Land of a Thousand Dances", "When You Believe in You", "Hooked on You", "Live for Loving You"	September 29, 1992	
"Fashion Forward"	134	Elaine Overbey	Thomas W. Lynch	Jared cooks up a fashion business idea; which turns out to be a lot of work for Haylie. Songs: "I'm On the Fly", "Baby Baby", "The Promise of a New Day", "Don't Want to Be a Fool", "Spirit"	September 30, 1992	
"The Commercial"	135			Flip shoots a television commercial to promote the P*lace. Songs: "Motownphilly", "I'm the One You Need", "Masterpiece", "A Magical Place", "God Gave Rock and Roll to You"	October 1, 1992	
"Party Out"	136	Gary Stein & Sam Ingraffia	Morris Abraham	A party is held celebrating the opening of a new beach club; but only Kenny is invited. Songs: "Party", "Please, Mr. Postman", "Tell Me What You Want Me to Do", "Temptation", "Dancing Shoes"; Note: According to the copyright, this episode was produced during season 7.	October 2, 1992	
"Old Friends"	137	Michael Baber	Morris Abraham	Haylie's best friend Kasey begins to develop a romantic interest in her. Meanwhile, the kids hold a community clean-up event. Songs: "We Got a Love Thang", "Every Heartbeat", "Save the Best for Last", "Under the Spell", "Real Real Real"	October 5, 1992	
"On Your Toes"	138			Jared tries to impress a girl by taking dance lessons. Guest appearances by Jennifer Hamilton and former Kids Incorporated dancer Wendy Brainard. Songs: "Finally", "A Teenager in Love", "How Do I Deal With These Feelings", "What Goes Around", "Change"	October 6, 1992	
"The Boy of La Mancha"	139	Elaine Overbey	Patricia Eyerman	Nicole has difficulty getting the other members of the town clean-up committee to take her seriously. Songs: "Jump", "Next to You", "Miracle", "Seal Our Fate", "Nayib's Song (I Am Here for You)"; Note: Haylie Johnson's little sister Ashley Johnson guest stars as an audience member in "The Boy of La Mancha".	October 7, 1992	

=== Season 9 (1993–1994) ===
Kenny Ford, Sean O'Riordan, and Jared Delgin did not return for this season. Added to the cast were Charlie Brady and Anthony Harrell. With Flip gone, "The P*lace" was now managed by a new character, Dena (played by Dena Burton).

During this season, several changes were made in an attempt to freshen up the series; including a change in the logo, cutting the number of songs featured from seasons 1–8 from five down to four (and in two episodes, just three), and an updated, more rock-based closing theme. Also, this season marked the only time that adult characters other than the P*lace manager were given significance in the plots. Also, as part of massive set changes, the "Coco Club" was replaced by a pizza parlor.

Budget cuts and the expiration of Disney's lease with MGM prompted another hiatus in 1993, after only ten episodes of Season 9 had been filmed. The last episode of this season, which aired on January 9, 1994, proved to be the series finale. By the summer of 1995, when the show was scheduled to resume production, most of the cast members had gotten too old to sustain the Kids Incorporated image. Thus, the show did not continue.

The format of the show would have changed, giving the songs less importance and placing them in breaks in the main storyline action, and some proposed scripts had no songs at all. In addition, the show's filming would have moved from Los Angeles to Canada; there was some hype created for the new Kids Incorporated project in Los Angeles and New York, but it never came to fruition.

After its default cancellation, the show continued to be shown in reruns on the Disney Channel until May 30, 1996.

Cast

- Charlie Brady
- Nicole Brown
- Anthony Harrell
- Anastasia Horne
- Haylie Johnson
- Dena Burton

Dancers

- Charon Aldredge
- Ken Arata
- Brian Friedman
- Andre Fuentes
- Danielle Marcus-Janssen

Title	Episode #	Writers	Directors	Summary	Airdate
"The Boy Next Door"	140			Kenny and Jared are no longer part of Kids Incorporated. Charlie and Anthony have replaced them as members of Kids Incorporated. Flip has left The P*lace. The P*lace is now being run by a shy woman named Dena. Ana discovers that she likes a boy, however she is uncomfortable with him being in a wheelchair. Songs: "Friday I'm in Love", "I Have Nothing", "Just Another Day", "We Can Make It Together"	November 13, 1993
"Don't Phone Home"	141	Ken Lipman	Paul Hoen	Nicole's phone privileges are taken away following her father discovering a large telephone bill on calls to her crush. Guest appearances by Irv Burton and Orson Van Gay II. Songs: "You Want This", "Gone Too Soon", "We're Just Gonna Have Fun", "Faithful"	November 14, 1993
"Secret Admirer"	142	George McGrath	Paul Hoen	Haylie gets a secret admirer; and the kids try to figure out who he is. Brett Kelley guest stars. Songs: "Warm It Up", "Saving Forever for You", "This Time", "Secret Fantasy"	November 15, 1993
"One Man Band"	143	Jennifer Wharton	Thomas W. Lynch	A young homeless teenager shows up at the P*lace looking for a job; and manages to gain the attention of Nicole. Guest appearance by Jason Strickland Songs: "We've Got to Love One Another", "The Way It Is", "Mr. Wendal", "(What's So Funny 'Bout) Peace, Love, and Understanding"	November 16, 1993
"Writing on the Wall"	144			The P*lace is vandalized with graffiti; only for "The Tagger" to turn out to be a one-time friend of Charlie's. Peter Ferrari guest stars. Songs: "Hip Hop Hooray", "Believe", "Clean Up Your World", "Crazy"	November 17, 1993
"Taking a Stand"	145	Blake Snyder	Gary Halvorson	Haylie's parents won't let her attend a concert with the other members due to problems during the band's tour. Jeanine Jackson guest stars. Songs: "Move This", "What About Your Friends", "In My Life", "You'll Never Have to Walk Alone"	December 24, 1993
"Face Your Fears"	146			Dena's college friend Kathy Brown comes to visit. Dena is afraid to see her because of a prank that she played on Kathy when they were in college. Songs: "Jump Around", "More and More", "Ticket to Ride"	December 25, 1993
"Dating Anxiety"	147			A girl (played by jj Godwin) asks Charlie out on a date. Songs: "I Got You (I Feel Good)", "Please Mr. Postman", "I Don't Know Why", "Do You Believe in Us"	January 7, 1994
"Teamwork"	148			Charlie and Anthony enter a local basketball tournament; but decline to invite the girls. Songs: "Rhythm is a Dancer", "His Story", "I Do Believe in You", "Respect"	January 8, 1994
"Bullied"	149			A bully (played by David Fulps) attempts to intimidate Anthony into quitting Kids Incorporated. Note: This episode, aired on January 9, 1994, would turn out to be the series finale, as the show was put on hiatus and eventually canceled. Songs: "Funky Big Band"; "One", "Respect Yourself"; "Forever and Today"	January 9, 1994

== Notes ==
1.^{a} ^{b} An original song composed specifically for the show, not to be confused with the Burt Bacharach and Carole Bayer Sager song of the same name.
