= See If I Care =

See If I Care may refer to:

== Music ==
=== Albums ===
- See If I Care (Gary Allan album) 2003

=== Songs ===
- "See If I Care", single by Barbara McNair, Don Wolf, Ben Raleigh 1958
- "See If I Care", single by Judy Lynn 1958
- See If I Care (song), a song by American country music group Shenandoah written by Walt Aldridge and Robert Byrne 1990
- "See If I Care", song by Gary Allan Jamie O'Hara on See If I Care (Gary Allan album)
- "See If I Care", single by Ria Bartok F. Pourcel, R. Lefebvre, P. Delance, B. Barratt 1964
- "See If I Care", single by Martika, on Martika (album) Greatest Hits compilation I Feel the Earth Move (album) 1998
- "See If I Care", song by Fracus on Hardcore Nation: Next Generation
- "See If I Care", song by Mother Goose on Stuffed (album) 1977
- "See If I Care", song by Finnish band Disco Ensemble on First Aid Kit (album) 2005
