= I Feel the Earth Move (disambiguation) =

"I Feel the Earth Move" is a Carole King song.

I Feel the Earth Move is also the name of:

- I Feel the Earth Move (album), a greatest hits compilation by Martika
- "I Feel the Earth Move", a section of Philip Glass' opera Einstein on the Beach
