= Tommy Puett =

American actor

- Born: Ralph Thomas Puett III; January 12, 1971 (age 55); Gary, Indiana
- Occupations: Actor; singer; dancer; businessman
- Years active: 1988–1997
- Website: ultrasp.com

Ralph Thomas Puett III (born January 12, 1971) is an American actor, singer, dancer, and businessman. He is best known for his role as Tyler Benchfield on Life Goes On. Puett left the show in 1991. Puett is the older brother of former Kids Incorporated star Devyn Puett. In high school Puett was signed to Scotti Brothers Records. Puett released his only album Life Goes On in 1990. That same year Puett's only video album Heart Attack was released. Devyn sang back up vocals on the album. After releasing Life Goes On Puett was cast as Ben in Switchback in 1997. Switchback was Puett's last acting role.

== Personal life ==
Puett retired from acting in 1997. Puett graduated from Diamond Bar High School in 1989. Puett and his wife Robin have two children. After retiring from acting Puett went on to pursue a career in business. He now runs Ultra Sport Products.

== Filmography ==
Film
Year	Film	Role	Other notes
1997	Switchback	Ben	
Television
Year	Title	Role	Notes
1988	Broken Angel	Bob	TV movie
1988	Aaron's Way	Coaster	1 season
1989	The Case of the Hillside Stranglers	Mark Grogan	TV movie
1989–1992	Life Goes On	Tyler Benchfield	66 Episodes
1991–1992	America's Top 10	Himself/host	200 Episodes
1993	Step by Step	Steve	Episode: No Business Like Show Business

== Award nominations ==
Year	Award	Result	Category	Series or song
1988–1989	Young Artist Award	Nominated	Best Young Actor Supporting Role in a Television Series	Life Goes On
1988–1989	Young Artist Award	Nominated	Favorite New Recording Artist	Kiss You All Over

== Albums ==
- Life Goes On (1990)

== Video albums ==
- Heart Attack (1990)
