= Devyn Puett =

American actress

- Born: November 22, 1977 (age 48); West Covina, California
- Occupations: Actress; singer; dancer
- Years active: 1986–1995
- Website: pinterest.com/dbelville

Devyn Puett (born November 22, 1977) is an American actress, singer, and dancer. She is best known for her role as Devyn on Kids Incorporated. Devyn is the younger sister of former Life Goes On star Tommy Puett.

== Acting career ==
Born in West Covina, California, Puett made her acting debut in Kidsongs under the stage name Poochie Puett. After her time on Kidsongs ended, Puett was cast as Devyn on Kids Incorporated and appeared on the series during seasons 5 and 6. As a singer, Puett was featured in the children's chorus of the hit single "Toy Soldiers", recorded by former Kids Incorporated star Martika. Puett was among the tribe of lost children in the Tina Turner video for the song "We Don't Need Another Hero (Thunderdome)".

In her early twenties, Puett worked for many producers writing and recording. She sang backup vocals on Tommy's only album Life Goes On. She was in American Masters as Virginia Poe in 1995. American Masters was Puett's final acting project.
