= Love... Thy Will Be Done =

1991 single by Martika

- Cover art for overseas CD and vinyl releases

Single by Martika

from the album Martika's Kitchen
- B-side: "Mi tierra"; "Temptation"
- Released: July 18, 1991
- Studio: Paisley Park (Chanhassen, Minnesota)
- Genre: Pop
- Length: 4:24
- Label: Columbia
- Songwriters: Martika; Prince
- Producer: Prince

Martika singles chronology
| "Water" (1990) | "Love... Thy Will Be Done" (1991) | "Martika's Kitchen" (1991) |

Music video
- "Love... Thy Will Be Done" on YouTube

"Love... Thy Will Be Done" is the first single released from American singer and actress Martika's second album, Martika's Kitchen (1991). The Prince-produced single, written by Martika and Prince, was released on July 18, 1991, by Columbia Records. The song reached the top 10 on the charts of seven countries, including the United States, where it peaked at number 10 on the Billboard Hot 100. In Australia, it topped the ARIA Singles Chart for a week in October 1991. The song's black-and-white music video was directed by Michael Haussman.

== Background ==
This song introduced Martika to a more adult contemporary sound than her previous efforts. The song is particularly remarkable for its constant backline, played by the drums and the bass, without any variation throughout the song, neither as far as rhythm or intensity is concerned, independently of other effects in the song (climax, forte, piano, backing vocals, etc.). Similarly, the melody insists particularly on monochord lines and repeats the "love thy will be done" notes as a leitmotif. According to an article in the online magazine Pitchfork, the song "almost certainly" contains a sample of "Fifty-Fifty Clown" by Scottish band Cocteau Twins.

== Track listings ==
- 7-inch single
1. "Love... Thy Will Be Done" – 4:20
2. "Mi tierra" – 4:34
- CD maxi
1. "Love... Thy Will Be Done" – 4:20
2. "Mi tierra" – 4:35
3. "Temptation" – 4:45
- CD single
1. "Love... Thy Will Be Done" – 4:20
2. "Mi tierra" – 4:34
- Cassette
1. "Love... Thy Will Be Done" – 4:20
2. "Mi tierra" – 4:34

== Charts ==
=== Weekly charts ===
Weekly chart performance for "Love... Thy Will Be Done"
| Chart (1991–1992) | Peak position |
|---|---|
| Australia (ARIA) | 1 |
| Belgium (Ultratop 50 Flanders) | 28 |
| Canada Top Singles (RPM) | 7 |
| Canada Adult Contemporary (RPM) | 29 |
| Europe (Eurochart Hot 100) | 20 |
| European Hit Radio (Music & Media) | 2 |
| Finland (Suomen virallinen lista) | 15 |
| France (SNEP) | 10 |
| Germany (GfK) | 26 |
| Ireland (IRMA) | 8 |
| Luxembourg (Radio Luxembourg) | 7 |
| Netherlands (Dutch Top 40) | 30 |
| Netherlands (Single Top 100) | 27 |
| New Zealand (Recorded Music NZ) | 4 |
| Quebec (ADISQ) | 3 |
| Switzerland (Schweizer Hitparade) | 26 |
| UK Singles (Official Charts) | 9 |
| UK Airplay (Music Week) | 1 |
| US Billboard Hot 100 | 10 |
| US Adult Contemporary (Billboard) | 40 |
| US Cash Box Top 100 | 10 |

=== Year-end charts ===
Year-end chart performance for "Love... Thy Will Be Done"
| Chart (1991) | Position |
|---|---|
| Australia (ARIA) | 14 |
| Canada Top Singles (RPM) | 60 |
| Europe (European Hit Radio) | 21 |
| New Zealand (RIANZ) | 47 |
| UK Singles (OCC) | 67 |
| US Billboard Hot 100 | 58 |

== Certifications ==
Certifications for "Love... Thy Will Be Done"
| Region | Certification | Certified units/sales |
|---|---|---|
| Australia (ARIA) | Platinum | 70,000^{^} |
^{^} Shipments figures based on certification alone.

== Release history ==
Release history and formats for "Love... Thy Will Be Done"
| Region | Date | Format(s) | Label(s) | Ref. |
|---|---|---|---|---|
| Japan | July 18, 1991 | Mini-CD | Sony | |
| United States | July 25, 1991 | 7-inch vinyl; cassette | Columbia | |
| Australia | July 29, 1991 | CD; cassette | Columbia | |
| United Kingdom | August 5, 1991 | 7-inch vinyl; 12-inch vinyl; CD; cassette | Columbia | |
| United Kingdom | September 2, 1991 | Limited-edition 7-inch vinyl | Columbia | |

== Covers and samples ==
Prince performed this song during his tours in the later 1990s and in 2012. He also used a sample of it for his cover of "One of Us" on his album Emancipation. Prince's original version was released on his posthumous album Originals in 2019. Singer Jessie Ware released a cover version in April 2013, and singer Delta Goodrem released a cover version in September 2014.

=== Delta Goodrem version ===
"Love Thy Will Be Done"

Single by Delta Goodrem
- Released: September 12, 2014
- Genre: Pop
- Length: 4:02
- Label: Sony Music Australia
- Songwriters: Martika, Prince

Delta Goodrem singles chronology
| "Heart Hypnotic" (2013) | "Love Thy Will Be Done" (2014) | "Only Human" (2015) |

Audio video
- "Love Thy Will Be Done" on YouTube

In 2014, Australian singer/songwriter Delta Goodrem released a version to promote her Australia and New Zealand tour with opera singer Andrea Bocelli. It was announced on her Twitter account just days before the release. It was released on iTunes and Google Play as a digital download and at JB Hi-Fi and Sanity as a CD single. Pre-orders from Sanity came with a limited edition 'D' keyring. The CD single also includes a cover of Shakespears Sister's song "Stay".

==== Track listings ====
- Digital download
1. "Love Thy Will Be Done" – 4:02
- CD single
1. "Love Thy Will Be Done" – 4:02
2. "Stay" – 3:50

==== Charts ====
Weekly chart performance for "Love Thy Will Be Done"
| Chart (2014) | Peak position |
|---|---|
| Australia (ARIA) | 59 |
