= Martika (album) =

Studio album by Martika
- Released: October 18, 1988
- Recorded: April–May 1988
- Studio: Trax Recording (Hollywood, California)
- Genre: Teen pop; dance-pop
- Length: 41:59
- Label: Columbia
- Producer: Michael Jay

Martika chronology
Martika (1988)	Martika's Kitchen (1991)

Alternative cover
- European edition

Singles from Martika
- 1. "More Than You Know" Released: November 1988; 2. "Toy Soldiers" Released: April 26, 1989; 3. "I Feel the Earth Move" Released: July 1989; 4. "Water" Released: 1990

Professional ratings
Review scores
Source	Rating
AllMusic	4/5 stars

Martika is the debut studio album by singer-songwriter Martika, released on October 18, 1988, through CBS Records. Following her appearance in the children's television programme Kids Incorporated between 1984 and 1986, she signed her first recording contract with CBS, and released her debut single "More Than You Know" in November 1988, one month following the release of the album. The follow up single, "Toy Soldiers" achieved international commercial success, reaching number one on the US Billboard Hot 100 for two weeks in mid-1989. Further singles from the album "I Feel the Earth Move" and "Water" achieved some commercial success in the United Kingdom and Australia.

The album was certified Gold in the United States, and Platinum in both the United Kingdom and Canada, whilst in Australia it was awarded a double platinum certification by the Australian Recording Industry Association. Worldwide, Martika is estimated to have sold over three million copies since its release.

== Background ==
The album marked the solo debut for Martika, and spawned the American No. 1 single "Toy Soldiers". The song is about drug addiction, but can sound like a break-up ballad. The song was later sampled by rapper Eminem for his 2004 song "Like Toy Soldiers" featuring Martika as the chorus singer. Songs that charted internationally included "More Than You Know", "Water", and "I Feel the Earth Move", a Carole King cover that cracked the American Top 25. Stylistically the music was strictly pop, despite exploring some adult topics lyrically. "Water" is partially sung in Spanish, a homage to Martika's Cuban ancestry. Other songs were re-recorded fully in Spanish for international release.

Although this was the album Martika attempted to break away from her Kids Incorporated image, she did have four of her former castmates sing the "children's chorus" of "Toy Soldiers".

The album was successful in the U.S.; it peaked at No. 15 on the Billboard 200 and was certified Gold by the RIAA, making it her best-selling album to date. The album peaked at No. 11 in the United Kingdom, containing three top 20 singles there. In the UK, the song "Cross My Heart" had already been a top 20 hit for the band Eighth Wonder a year previously, whilst Big Fun pulled their planned single release of "I Feel the Earth Move" shortly before Martika's release.

== Track listing ==
Side A
No.	Title	Writer(s)	Length
1.	"If You're Tarzan, I'm Jane"	Michael Jay; Greg Smith	4:20
2.	"Cross My Heart"	Jay	3:52
3.	"More Than You Know"	Martika; Jay; Marvin Morrow	4:10
4.	"Toy Soldiers"	Martika; Jay	4:51
5.	"You Got Me Into This"	Jay	4:11

Side B
No.	Title	Writer(s)	Length
1.	"I Feel the Earth Move"	Carole King	4:12
2.	"Water"	Martika; Sue Sheridan; Larry Treadwell	4:39
3.	"It's Not What You're Doing"	Robert Etoll; Jay	4:13
4.	"See If I Care"	Martika; Jay; Morrow	3:41
5.	"Alibis"	Martika; Mitchell Kaplan	3:50

== Personnel ==
- Martika – lead vocals, backing vocals (2, 5, 8–10), shaker (10), arrangements (10), vocal arrangements
- Greg Smith – keyboards, such as Yamaha DX7 (1, 4, 6), arrangements (1)
- Claude Gaudette – additional keyboards (1, 6), keyboards (2, 7), drum programming (2, 5, 7), arrangements (2, 5, 7)
- Brad Cole – additional keyboards (2), keyboards (3, 8), synth horns (5), arrangements (8)
- Marvin Morrow – keyboards (3, 9), drum programming (3), arrangements (9)
- Mitchell Kaplan – keyboards (10)
- Mark Leggett – guitars (1–5, 7–9)
- Don Kirkpatrick – guitars (6)
- David Macias – guitars (10)
- Marc Jones – bass (10)
- Michael Jay – drum programming (1, 2, 4–6, 8, 9), backing vocals (1), vocal arrangements (1–9), arrangements (1, 3, 4, 6, 8, 10)
- Christopher Ainsworth – drum programming (7)
- Omar Martinez – drums (10)
- Paulinho da Costa – percussion (5, 7, 9)
- Michael Mattioli – saxophone (10)
- Michael Cruz – backing vocals (1)
- Davey Faragher – backing vocals (1)
- Clif Magness – backing vocals (1)
- Rick Jude Palombi – backing vocals (1, 3, 6, 7)
- Donna De Lory – backing vocals (3, 6)
- Niki Haris – backing vocals (3)
- Stacy Ferguson – backing vocals (4)
- Marlen Landin – backing vocals (4)
- Kimberly McCullough – backing vocals (4)
- Jennifer Love Hewitt – backing vocals (4)
- Rahsaan Patterson – backing vocals (4, 7, 10)
- Devyn Puett – backing vocals (4)
- Renee Sands – backing vocals (4)
- Alitzah Wiener – backing vocals (4)
- Mona Lisa Young – backing vocals (6)
- Laura Creamer – backing vocals (7)
- Mendy Lee – backing vocals (7)
- Sue Sheridan – backing vocals (7)

== Production ==
- Michael Jay – producer
- Michael McDonald – engineer, mixing (1–4, 6, 9, 10)
- Peter Arata – assistant engineer
- Ric Butz – assistant engineer
- John Hegedes – assistant engineer
- Greg Loskorn – assistant engineer
- Karen Siegel – assistant engineer
- Russ Iadevaia – lead vocal recording (2)
- Keith "KC" Cohen – mixing (5, 8)
- Brian Malouf – mixing (7)
- Garden Rake Studios (Sherman Oaks, California) – mixing location
- Larrabee Sound Studios (North Hollywood, California) – mixing location
- Stephen Marcussen – mastering at Precision Lacquer (Hollywood, California)
- Nancy Donald – art direction
- Tony Lane – art direction
- Arnold Levine – art direction
- David Coleman – design
- Alberto Tolot – photography

== Chart performance ==
=== Weekly charts ===
Chart (1988)	Peak position
Australian Albums Chart	2
Austrian Albums Chart	18
Canadian Albums Chart	17
New Zealand Albums Chart	11
Norwegian Albums Chart	17
Swedish Albums Chart	26
Swiss Albums Chart	11
UK Albums Chart	11
US Billboard 200	15
Finnish Albums (The Official Finnish Charts)	20
European Albums (Eurotipsheet)	36

=== Year-end charts ===
Chart (1989)	Peak position
Australian Albums (ARIA)	89

== Sales and certifications ==
Certifications for Martika
Region	Certification	Certified units/sales
Australia (ARIA)	2× Platinum	140,000^{^}
Canada (Music Canada)	Platinum	100,000^{^}
Japan (RIAJ)	Gold	100,000^{^}
New Zealand (RMNZ)	Gold	7,500^{^}
Spain (Promusicae)	Gold	50,000^{^}
United Kingdom (BPI)	Platinum	300,000^{^}
United States (RIAA)	Gold	500,000^{^}
^{^} Shipments figures based on certification alone.
