= I Feel the Earth Move (album) =

Greatest hits album by Martika
- Released: 1998
- Genre: Pop; dance-pop
- Label: Columbia

Martika chronology
Best Of: More Than You Know (1997)	I Feel the Earth Move (1998)	Violince (2004)

I Feel the Earth Move is a greatest hits compilation album by Martika released only in Germany in 1998.

== Track listing ==
1. "I Feel the Earth Move" – 4:13
2. "Cross My Heart" – 3:51
3. "Water" – 4:32
4. "If You're Tarzan, I'm Jane" – 4:20
5. "You Got Me Into This" – 4:11
6. "Martika's Kitchen" – 5:09
7. "See If I Care" – 3:42
8. "Broken Heart" – 4:34
9. "Mi Tierra" – 4:38
10. "Spirit" – 4:39
11. "Alibis" – 3:51
12. "Take Me to Forever" – 4:36
13. "Magical Place" – 4:42
14. "Safe in the Arms of Love" – 5:09
