= Oppera =

American pop duo

- Origin: United States
- Genres: Pop rock
- Years active: 2003–present
- Members: Martika; Michael Mozart

Oppera is an American pop duo consisting of singer Martika and her musician husband Michael Mozart. They began recording together in 2003 and released their first album, Violince, in 2004. A co-headlining tour in support of the album occurred that year with singer Pat Benatar and her husband Neil Giraldo.

In 2005, they released a second album titled Oppera and toured Borders Books locations.

== Discography ==
Albums

- Violince (2004)
- Oppera (2005)
