= I Feel the Earth Move =

1971 song written by Carole King

- US vinyl single; picture is also used for the "It's Too Late" side and the parent album Tapestry

Single by Carole King

from the album Tapestry
- A-side: "It's Too Late"
- Released: April 16, 1971
- Studio: A&M (Hollywood, California)
- Genre: Pop rock
- Length: 3:00
- Label: Ode
- Songwriter: Carole King
- Producer: Lou Adler

Carole King singles chronology
| "He's a Bad Boy" (1964) | "It's Too Late" / "I Feel the Earth Move" (1971) | "So Far Away" / "Smackwater Jack" (1971) |

"I Feel the Earth Move" is a song written and performed by American singer-songwriter Carole King, for her second studio album Tapestry (1971). Additionally, the song is one half of the double A-sided single, the flip side of which was "It's Too Late". Together, both "I Feel the Earth Move" and "It's Too Late" became among the biggest mainstream pop hits of 1971.

== Reception ==
Jon Landau's review of Tapestry for Rolling Stone praised Carole King's voice on this track, saying it negotiates turns from "raunchy" to "bluesy" to "harsh" to "soothing", with the last echoing the development of the song's melody into its chorus. Landau describes the melody of the refrain as "a pretty pop line". Forty years later, Rolling Stone stated that King's "warm, earnest singing" brought "earthy joy" to the song. Music journalist Harvey Kubernik wrote that "I Feel the Earth Move" was "probably the most sexually aggressive song on the Tapestry album" and a "brave" opening to an album whose mood is mostly "mellow confessionality".

AllMusic critic Stewart Mason describes the song as "the ultimate in hippie-chick eroticism" and writes that it "sounds like the unleashing of an entire generation of soft-spoken college girls' collective libidos". Cash Box described the song as being a "forceful 'earthquake song'" and considered its pairing with "It's Too Late" as a single to be "double dynamite". Record World said that it is "quality contemporary pop".

Author James Perone praised the way the lyrics and music work together. As a prime example, he notes the syncopated rhythm to the melody on which King sings "tumbling down". This rhythm, putting the accent at the end of the word "tumbling" rather than at the beginning, produces a "musical equivalent of a tumble". Perone also notes that the fast tempo allows the listener to feel the singer's excitement over being near her lover, and that the lyrics also express sexual tension even though that tension is left implicit. Perone attributes some of the song's success to producer Lou Adler's decision to highlight King's piano playing in the mix, giving it a different feel from the guitar-based singer-songwriter approach King took in her prior album. Mason also attributes the song's success to the "piano-led groove" and to King's vocal delivery.

King's version of "I Feel the Earth Move" peaked at number one on the US Billboard Hot 100 chart dated June 19, 1971. It remained there for five consecutive weeks. It also peaked at number 6 on the UK Singles Chart.

Given its upbeat nature, Ode Records selected "I Feel the Earth Move" as the A-side to Tapestry's first single. It achieved airplay, but then disc jockeys and listeners began to prefer the slower, lamenting B-side "It's Too Late". Both sides received airplay for a while, but eventually "It's Too Late" dominated. In fact, on the concurrent Cash Box singles chart, which still tracked the progress of both sides of a single separately, "It's Too Late" spent four weeks at number 1 while "I Feel the Earth Move" did not chart at all. Regardless, since Billboard had declared the record a double A-side and their chart gradually became seen by many as the "official" singles chart, it is generally listed in books and articles that both "I Feel the Earth Move" and "It's Too Late" reached number 1.

Together with "It's Too Late", "I Feel the Earth Move" was named by the RIAA as number 213 of 365 Songs of the Century.

== Personnel ==
- Carole King – keyboards, vocals
- Danny Kootch – electric guitar
- Charles Larkey – electric bass
- Joel O'Brien – drums

== Charts ==
All entries charted with "It's Too Late".

=== Weekly charts ===
| Chart (1971) | Peak position |
|---|---|
| Australia (Kent Music Report) | 6 |
| UK Singles (Official Charts) | 6 |
| US Billboard Hot 100 | 1 |

=== Year-end charts ===
| Chart (1971) | Position |
|---|---|
| US Billboard Hot 100 | 3 |

== Certifications ==
| Region | Certification | Certified units/sales |
|---|---|---|
| United Kingdom (BPI) | Silver | 200,000^{‡} |
| United States (RIAA) | Gold | 500,000^{‡} |
^{‡} Sales+streaming figures based on certification alone.

== Martika version ==
"I Feel the Earth Move"

Single by Martika

from the album Martika
- B-side: "Quiero Entregarte Mi Amor"
- Released: August 1989
- Genre: Dance-pop
- Length: 4:12
- Label: Columbia
- Songwriter: Carole King
- Producers: Martika; Michael Jay

Martika singles chronology
| "Toy Soldiers" (1989) | "I Feel the Earth Move" (1989) | "Water" (1990) |

Music video
- "I Feel the Earth Move" on YouTube

American singer-songwriter and actress Martika released a cover of "I Feel the Earth Move" in mid-1989. It was issued as the third single from her debut album, Martika (1988). The song reached number seven in the United Kingdom and number two in Australia. It also reached number 25 on the Billboard Hot 100 but quickly fell down the chart after radio stations pulled it from their playlists in the wake of the 1989 Loma Prieta earthquake. The music video was shot during the promotional tour for this album.

=== Track listing ===
- Cassette and 7-inch single
- Side A – "I Feel the Earth Move"
- Side B – "Quiero Entregarte Mi Amor" (Spanish version of "More Than You Know")

=== Charts ===
==== Weekly charts ====
| Chart (1989–1990) | Peak position |
|---|---|
| Australia (ARIA) | 2 |
| Austria (Ö3 Austria Top 40) | 4 |
| Belgium (Ultratop 50 Flanders) | 33 |
| Canada Top Singles (RPM) | 47 |
| Canada Dance/Urban (RPM) | 5 |
| Europe (Eurochart Hot 100) | 22 |
| Finland (Suomen virallinen lista) | 11 |
| Ireland (IRMA) | 7 |
| New Zealand (Recorded Music NZ) | 3 |
| Switzerland (Schweizer Hitparade) | 22 |
| UK Singles (Official Charts) | 7 |
| US Billboard Hot 100 | 25 |
| US Dance Club Songs (Billboard) | 20 |
| US Cash Box Top 100 | 26 |
| West Germany (GfK) | 20 |

==== Year-end charts ====
| Chart (1989) | Position |
|---|---|
| Australia (ARIA) | 67 |
| UK Singles (OCC) | 71 |

| Chart (1990) | Position |
|---|---|
| Australia (ARIA) | 85 |

=== Certifications ===
| Region | Certification | Certified units/sales |
|---|---|---|
| Australia (ARIA) | Platinum | 70,000^{^} |
^{^} Shipments figures based on certification alone.

=== Release history ===
| Region | Date | Format(s) | Label(s) | Ref(s). |
|---|---|---|---|---|
| United States | August 1989 | 7-inch vinyl; 12-inch vinyl; cassette | Columbia | |
| United Kingdom | September 18, 1989 | 7-inch vinyl; 12-inch vinyl; CD | CBS | |
| Japan | September 21, 1989 | Mini-CD | CBS/Sony | |

== Other cover versions ==
In 1989, British boy band Big Fun recorded their version of the song, which was intended to be released as a single, but this was cancelled as Martika had just released her own cover. It was eventually only one of the songs on the B-side of their single "Can't Shake the Feeling" and was included on their 1990 album A Pocketful of Dreams, produced by the Stock Aitken Waterman team, on which it appears as a bonus track on the CD and cassette formats. Brix Smith in Record Mirror panned this version, calling it a "massacre" and adding that the fact of "discofy[ing]" the track shows "a lack of imagination, avarice, and insensitivity to music".
