= Kids Incorporated =

Television series

- The seasons 0 (pre-1)–8 (1983–1992) logo.
- Also known as: Kids Inc.
- Genre: Children's television series
- Created by: Thomas W. Lynch; Gary P. Biller
- Theme music composer: Michael Cruz
- Opening theme: "Kids Incorporated" (by Martika seasons 1-3, then the cast seasons 4-9)
- Ending theme: "Kids Incorporated" (instrumental)
- Country of origin: United States
- Original language: English
- No. of seasons: 9
- No. of episodes: 149 (list of episodes)

Production
- Executive producers: Jere P. Hausfater (1984–1985); Earl A. Glick (1985–1987); Thomas W. Lynch (1989–1994); Gary P. Biller (1989–1994); Robert Halmi Jr. (1989–1994)
- Producer: Sean McNamara
- Camera setup: Multi-camera
- Running time: 22 minutes
- Production companies: Lynch-Biller Productions (1984–1989); Lynch Entertainment (1991–1994); K-Tel Entertainment (1984); Hal Roach Studios (1985–1987); Qintex Entertainment (1988–1989); RHI Entertainment (1991–1994); MGM/UA Entertainment Co. Television

Original release
- Network: Syndication
- Release: September 1, 1984 – December 26, 1985
- Network: The Disney Channel
- Release: November 3, 1986 – January 9, 1994

Kids Incorporated (also known as Kids Inc.) is an American children's television program that began production in the early 1980s and continued airing into the mid-1990s. It was largely a youth-oriented program with musical performances as an integral part of every episode. The pilot episode was shot on September 1, 1983, and the series aired in syndication from September 1, 1984, to December 26, 1985, and on The Disney Channel from November 3, 1986, to January 9, 1994. Reruns aired on The Disney Channel until May 30, 1996.

== Plot ==
The show revolves around a group of children and teenagers who performed in their own rock group called Kids Incorporated. They struggled to deal with issues ranging from crushes to peer pressure to child abuse, while performing regularly at a local former music club called The P*lace, which was really called The Palace, but the first "a" in the sign burned out and was never replaced. The action took place on abstract "stagey" sets and the plots involved many fantasy elements, such as the group meeting a robot (Season 1, Episode 10), a runaway princess (Season 1, Episode 6) and even a wise-cracking bicycle (Season 1, Episode 17). In addition to their performances on stage, the group would often break into song when they were off-stage.

== Cast and characters ==
For many of the cast members, dancers and musicians, the show was the beginning of a successful career in the entertainment industry. The most visible stars are:

- Renee Sands and Stacy "Fergie" Ferguson, both of whom were founding members of pop trio Wild Orchid. Fergie later joined the Grammy Award-winning group the Black Eyed Peas, then launched her successful solo career. During her tenure on Kids Incorporated, she went from being the youngest member of the band to the oldest, and holds the record for the longest run at six seasons, including the pilot.
- Martika (a.k.a. Marta Marrero) became a singer with two hit studio records in the late 1980s-early 1990s ("Toy Soldiers", "Thy Will Be Done"); she began using the mononym Martika billing during her time on the series.
- Mario Lopez (Saved by the Bell, Pacific Blue, Dancing with the Stars, Extra, and Access Hollywood) – Lopez appeared as a background dancer and musician throughout the first three seasons of the series.
- Eric Balfour (24, Haven, Skyline)
- Jennifer Love Hewitt, who was credited simply as "Love Hewitt" (Party of Five, I Know What You Did Last Summer, Ghost Whisperer, Heartbreakers, Criminal Minds, and 9-1-1)
- Brian Friedman (bass guitarist, keyboards, keytar) – 1991–1994
- Brian Poth (keytarist, bass guitar, tambourine) – 1987–1988
- Shanice Wilson (keyboards, vocals) – 1984
- Rahsaan Patterson gained experience as a backup vocalist for several artists including Brandy Norwood and Tevin Campbell.

Cast Members
Cast	Year(s)	Seasons								
Cast	Year(s)	1	2	3	4	5	6	7	8	9
Stacy "Fergie" Ferguson	1984-1989							-	-	-
Marta Marrero (Martika)	1984-1986				-	-	-	-	-	-
Rahsaan Patterson	1984-1987					-	-	-	-	-
Renee Sands	1984-1987					-	-	-	-	-
Jerry Sharell	1984		-	-	-	-	-	-	-	-
Moosie Drier	1984-1988						-	-	-	-
Ryan Lambert	1985-1988	-					-	-	-	-
Connie Lew	1987-1988	-	-	-			-	-	-	-
Richard Shoff	1987-1989	-	-	-				-	-	-
Kenny Ford	1988-1992	-	-	-	-					-
Devyn Puett	1988-1989	-	-	-	-			-	-	-
(Jennifer) Love Hewitt	1989-1991	-	-	-	-	-			-	-
Sean O'Riordan	1989-1992	-	-	-	-	-				-
Eric Balfour	1990-1991	-	-	-	-	-	-		-	-
Anastasia Horne	1990-1993	-	-	-	-	-	-			
Haylie Johnson	1990-1993	-	-	-	-	-	-			
Nicole Brown	1992-1993	-	-	-	-	-	-	-		
Jared Delgin	1992	-	-	-	-	-	-	-		-
Charlie Brady	1993	-	-	-	-	-	-	-	-	
Anthony Harrell	1993	-	-	-	-	-	-	-	-	
Dena Burton	1993	-	-	-	-	-	-	-	-	

=== Guest stars ===
Guest stars included both established celebrities and newcomers. Gwen Verdon, Kathy Johnson, Barry Williams and Florence Henderson (both former stars of The Brady Bunch), Billy Blanks, David Hasselhoff, John Franklin, Ryan Bollman, Christian Hoff, Paul Rodriguez, Brian Robbins, and Ruth Buzzi were among those who appeared during the run of the show. Young actors who guest starred on it included Brittany Murphy (1992), Scott Wolf, Audra Lee (2 episodes), R.J. Williams, Jason Hervey, and Jeff Cohen (Chunk from The Goonies).

== Music ==
Music was an integral part of the show and five songs were included in every episode. The musical variety ranged over a number of genres released from the 1960s onward on K-Tel vinyl records. While these numbers were usually performed onstage in the context of a concert at The P*lace, they were also occasionally used to illustrate a character's internal monologue or conflict. The vocal responsibilities were shared by all five (or six) singers; every cast member was given an opportunity to perform featured or solo songs throughout the course of the season.

Each episode consisted of one original number and generally five previously recorded songs by recognized artists. Artists and songs ranged from the 1950s to the 1990s. The original songs were written by the hired composers of the show. Depending on the year those composers were Michael Cruz, Andrew R. Powell, Craig Sharmat, and others. Cruz is responsible for three of the shows original songs that appeared on K-Tel albums, "Kids Incorporated Theme Song", "Time Is On Our Side" and "Music For The Modern World".

Due to the age of both the performers and the target demographic, lyrics with objectionable content were generally edited out of the songs and replaced with more appropriate language. Songs that were examples of this include "Jump Around" by House of Pain and "Hip Hop Hooray" by Naughty by Nature. However, occasionally songs were performed as written, with the slightly objectionable lyrics intact. Examples of songs that were presented uncensored on the series include "Dancing with Myself" by Billy Idol ("The Storybook House" episode, 1990), "Seven Wonders" by Fleetwood Mac (1988), "Prove Your Love" by Taylor Dayne (although this had a slight edit on the chorus as "I wanna see your body dance with mine"), and "Smooth Criminal" by Michael Jackson (1989).

== Production and broadcast history ==
The original pilot for the show was produced in 1983 and shopped to several networks by creators Thomas W. Lynch and Gary Biller.

The show was not picked up by a major network, but, distributed by MGM/UA Entertainment Co. Television, began a syndicated run on September 1, 1984. The original four cast members, Stacy Ferguson, Marta Marrero, Renee Sands, and Jerry Sharell, were joined by Rahsaan Patterson and a company of five backup dancers. Sharell left after the first season, in part over unhappiness with the show's often bizarre and outlandish story lines.

As with most syndicated productions its scheduling was based on local stations rather than being offered universally at one time across the country. Some stations aired it on a weekday near prime time, while others had it as a weekend-only offering that could air as early as 6:30 a.m. Due to its overall unsettled schedule, ratings were never truly steady, and the show was cancelled on December 26, 1985. Reruns aired on CBN (now Freeform) from 1985 to 1986.

It was due to the positive ratings from the CBN reruns that in the summer of 1986, the show was given a second chance when the Disney Channel acquired the rights to it. It resumed production with the same cast (minus Sharell), and new episodes began airing on November 3, 1986. Disney's buyout package also included the entire syndicated run, and as Disney Channel has never carried traditional commercial breaks, the episodes were re-edited to remove any advertising-related continuity to become continuous episodes, which was also advantageous to later home video releases. Its main time slot on the Disney Channel was 5 p.m. ET/4 p.m. CT/2 p.m. PT; though still somewhat disadvantageous, the program now had a steady time slot, along with little to no ratings pressure, as Disney Channel was then offered as a premium cable service which paid little attention to program ratings.

After the sixth season (1989) was filmed, the show was put on hiatus for a year, during which time most of the cast moved on to other projects or aged out of the program. The only two who were invited to return in 1991 when it resumed production were Kenny Ford and Jennifer Love Hewitt.

Budget cuts and the expiration of Disney's output agreement with MGM prompted another hiatus in 1993, leading to the show's end, after Season 9's ten episodes completed production. The last episode aired on January 9, 1994. The show continued to be shown in reruns on the Disney Channel until May 30, 1996, and remains the network's longest-running program.

Originally taped at Hollywood Center Studios, later seasons were produced at Sunset Gower Studios.

=== Producers ===
Throughout its history, other producers and production companies were associated with the show, including K-tel Entertainment, Lynch-Biller Productions (later Lynch Entertainment; now The Tom Lynch Company), RHI Entertainment, and MGM Television (a.k.a. MGM-Pathé). Hal Roach Studios/Qintex, the studio responsible for the Our Gang (Little Rascals) short films series of the 1930s, was also involved with it. (Qintex was also responsible for the distribution of 1989 roller derby series RollerGames.)

The show essentially launched the careers of creators and producers Gary Biller and Thomas W. Lynch, who would go on to create The Secret World of Alex Mack and Romeo! (for Nickelodeon) among many other shows, leading the New York Times to call him "the David E. Kelley of 'tween TV". Prior to it, Lynch and Biller created and produced a long-running music video series for TBS, Night Tracks.

== Merchandise ==
=== Kids Incorporated: The Beginning and other videos ===
The 1983 pilot was recorded in August 1983 but never shown on television; however, in 1985, it was released on Beta and VHS as Kids Incorporated: The Beginning. In order to include Rahsaan Patterson, who joined the show after the pilot was shot, a new storyline was edited into the film. His character, Kid, was depicted as the new kid in town, who was very shy and afraid to audition for the group. He also revealed the origins of them. The "Kid" scenes were filmed in 1985, and edited in, with the 1983 footage of the rest of the cast or in with it.

Two additional videos were released in 1985, entitled ChartBusters and The Best of Kids Incorporated. While the show was still in syndication, four albums were also released, titled

- Kids Incorporated (1983)
- Kids Incorporated (1984)
- Kids Incorporated: The Chart Hits (1985)
- Kids Incorporated: New Attitude (1985)

At least two of these achieved platinum sales status. No further ones were released when the show moved to the Disney Channel because the company that produced them, K-Tel Records, filed for bankruptcy at around the same time.

== International versions ==
=== Japan ===
An original Japanese adaptation of the show, titled StarS, ran from 1999 to 2001. Between 13 and 26 episodes were filmed in each of its three seasons. A second version, StarS2, was scheduled to premiere on MBS in the summer of 2007. Both were produced by TOEI and co-produced by Sunrise Studios.

In addition, the American version, dubbed into Japanese, was shown on the MBS network until 2001.

=== New Zealand ===
The original New Zealand version of the show, High Life, began production in 1990. It ran periodically for five seasons, broadcasting six episodes per year, until 1995, when TVNZ-2 cancelled it.

=== Canada ===
The Rockets (aired on CKY Television in 1987, 1989 and 1991) is sort of a Canadian Kids Incorporated.
