= Martika's Kitchen =

Studio album by Martika
- Released: August 26, 1991
- Genre: Pop
- Length: 57:24
- Label: Columbia
- Producer: Prince; Christopher Max; Clivillés and Cole; Bob Rosa; Martika; Frankie Blue; Les Pierce; Joe Galdo

Martika chronology
Martika (1988)	Martika's Kitchen (1991)	Best of: More Than You Know (1997)

Singles from Martika's Kitchen
- 1. "Love... Thy Will Be Done" Released: July 18, 1991; 2. "Martika's Kitchen" Released: November, 1991; 3. "Coloured Kisses" Released: February 10, 1992; 4. "Safe in the Arms of Love" Released: January 4, 1993; 5. "Spirit (remixes; promo only)" Released: January 29, 1993

Professional ratings
Review scores
Source	Rating
AllMusic	3/5 stars
Calgary Herald	C
Entertainment Weekly	C
Los Angeles Times	1/4 stars
Q	2/5 stars
Smash Hits	7/10 stars

Martika's Kitchen is the second and final studio album by singer-songwriter Martika, released in 1991 on Columbia Records. The album was reissued in deluxe two-CD edition in 2018 as Martika's Kitchen (Reheated Edition) with 12 bonus tracks of rare mixes and single edits.

== Album background ==
The album was a departure in musical styles from Martika's debut album. Martika's Kitchen incorporates elements of gospel, jazz, funk, R&B and traditional Cuban music. The album features four songs written and produced by Prince. The four Prince songs (tracks 1–3 and 10) on the album were recorded by him and then sent to Martika to overdub. Three of those songs were based on a lyrics notebook she had given him for inspiration.

== Album reception ==
The Prince-penned title track cracked the US Billboard Hot 100 and the gospel-themed "Love... Thy Will Be Done", co-written by Prince and Martika, made the top 10.

The album was certified gold in both the UK and Australia. "Love... Thy Will Be Done" reached #1 in Australia, and the top 10 in the UK, Ireland, and New Zealand. The "Martika's Kitchen" single reached the top 40 in the UK, Ireland, Germany, Australia, and New Zealand. A third single, "Coloured Kisses", narrowly missed the top 40 in the UK, and peaked at #39 in Australia. A fourth single, "Safe In the Arms of Love", was released in Europe in 1992 but failed to chart. "Temptation" was set to become the final single but was never officially released.

A concert tour to promote the album visited over 200 cities.

== Track listing ==
CD (Main Course)
No.	Title	Writer(s)	Producer(s)	Length
1.	"Martika's Kitchen"	Prince	Martika; Prince	5:09
2.	"Spirit"	Frankie Blue; Martika; Prince; Levi Seacer Jr.	Prince; Martika	4:38
3.	"Love... Thy Will Be Done"	Martika; Prince	Martika; Prince	5:02
4.	"A Magical Place"	Christopher Max	Max	4:41
5.	"Coloured Kisses"	Blue; Les Pierce; Martika	Clivillés and Cole	4:37
6.	"Safe in the Arms of Love"	Michael Cruz; Martika; Michael Jay	Bob Rosa	5:09
7.	"Pride and Prejudice"	Cruz; Martika	Martika	5:12
8.	"Take Me to Forever"	Martika; Jay	Rosa; Blue; Pierce	4:35
9.	"Temptation"	Blue; Pierce; Martika	Rosa; Blue; Pierce; Martika	4:46
10.	"Don't Say U Love Me"	Martika; Prince	Martika; Prince	4:24
11.	"Broken Heart"	Blue; Pierce; Martika	Blue; Pierce	4:33
12.	"Mi Tierra" (Duet with Cecilia Cruz)	Blue; Pierce; Martika	Joe Galdo	4:38
Total length:				57:24

=== Reheated edition - bonus disc ===
Reheated Edition CD 2 (Side Orders: Remixes & Edits)
No.	Title	Writer(s)	Length
1.	"Love... Thy Will Be Done" (7" Edit)	Martika; Prince	4:23
2.	"Martika's Kitchen" (7" Edit)	Prince	4:12
3.	"Coloured Kisses" (7" Edit)	Blue; Pierce; Martika	4:08
4.	"Safe in the Arms of Love" (Edit Version)	Cruz; Martika; Jay	3:19
5.	"Spirit" (Radio Edit)	Blue; Martika; Prince; Seacer	3:56
6.	"Love... Thy Will Be Done" (Prince Mix)	Martika; Prince	5:58
7.	"Martika's Kitchen" (Remix 1 Alt. 7” Video Version)	Prince	5:00
8.	"Coloured Kisses" (Remix)	Blue; Pierce; Martika	4:57
9.	"Spirit" (House Mix)	Blue; Martika; Prince; Seacer	8:04
10.	"Martika's Kitchen" (Extended Version)	Prince	5:24
11.	"Spirit" (Hip-Hop Mix)	Blue; Martika; Prince; Seacer	5:01
12.	"Martika's Kitchen" (Alt. Dub Version)	Prince	5:09
Total length:			57:24

== Chart performance ==
Chart (1991)	Peak position
Australian Albums Chart	9
Canadian Albums Chart	81
German Albums Chart	51
New Zealand Albums Chart	40
UK Albums Chart	15
US Billboard 200	111
Finnish Albums (The Official Finnish Charts)	24
European Albums (Eurotipsheet)	55
Dutch Albums (Album Top 100)	78

== Sales and certifications ==
Certifications for Martika's Kitchen
Region	Certification	Certified units/sales
Australia (ARIA)	Gold	35,000^{^}
Spain (PROMUSICAE)	Gold	50,000^{^}
United Kingdom (BPI)	Gold	100,000^{^}
^{^} Shipments figures based on certification alone.
