= Nikki (singer) =

Japanese-American musician

- Also known as: Nikki Lee; Michael Mozart; Michael Daemon
- Born: Okinawa, Japan
- Origin: Dayton, Ohio, US
- Label: Geffen
- Spouse: Martika (m. 2001)

Nikki (or Nikki Lee) is a Japanese-American musician, born in Okinawa, Japan, and raised in Dayton, Ohio, United States. Signed to Geffen Records, he released one album, Nikki, in 1989. Three singles were released from the album: "Ooti Ooti" and "Notice Me" in 1990, and "If You Wanna" in 1991. Of the three, only "Notice Me", written by Nikki and Paul David Wilson, was a hit, reaching #21 on the U.S. Billboard Hot 100, #11 on Billboard's Adult Contemporary chart and bringing Nikki and Wilson honors from BMI as writer and publisher of one of the most performed songs of the year, 1990.

Nikki was also a backing member of the soul-funk music group, Sun, and a writer of TV commercials.

Nikki is also known as Michael Mozart, and in 2003 he formed the band Oppera with his wife, singer Martika. Changing her sound to that of goth pop, she and Mozart released Oppera’s debut album Violince in 2004, followed by a self-titled album in 2005.

In 2009, Nikki changed his name to Michael Daemon and began producing, directing, writing and starring in the web based TV series J8ded.
