= Like Toy Soldiers =

2005 single by Eminem

Single by Eminem

from the album Encore
- Released: March 15, 2005
- Recorded: July 2004
- Genre: Conscious hip hop
- Length: 4:56
- Label: Aftermath; Shady; Interscope
- Songwriters: Marshall Mathers; Luis Resto; Marta Marrero; Michael Jay Margules
- Producers: Eminem; Luis Resto

Eminem singles chronology
"Encore/Curtains Down" (2004)	"Like Toy Soldiers" (2005)	"Mockingbird" (2005)

Music video
- "Like Toy Soldiers" on YouTube

"Like Toy Soldiers" is a song by American rapper Eminem, from his fifth album Encore (2004). The song received positive reviews from music critics, and peaked at number 34 on the Billboard Hot 100. Outside of the United States, "Like Toy Soldiers" topped the charts in the United Kingdom, and peaked within the top ten of the charts in 12 countries, including Australia, Denmark, Germany, and New Zealand. The song samples the 1989 song "Toy Soldiers" by Martika. It is the fourth single from the album. The song also appears on the Curtain Call: The Hits compilation released in 2005.

== Content ==
The song finishes as Eminem offers a truce to his enemies. In addition, this song also reveals that Eminem had tried to stop Ja Rule's & 50 Cent's feud, but lost it when he heard Ja Rule making fun of his daughter on a track called "Loose Change" – ("The Ja Shit, I tried to squash it, It was too late to stop it, There's a certain line you just don't cross and he crossed it, I heard him say Hailie's name on a song and I just lost it"). In the song "Loose Change", Ja Rule says Eminem claims his ex-wife is "a known slut" and his mother "a crackhead", and then asks him "so what's Hailie gonna be when she grows up?"

As a result of this song, Eminem refused to get himself involved in some of 50 Cent's later feuds, including Jadakiss, Fat Joe (both of whom he collaborated with in 2004), and The Game.

== Critical reception ==
AllMusic highlighted the song. A positive overview came from J-23: ""Like Toy Soldiers" is among his best work here, from his production (complete with Martika sample), to his gripping recount, assessment and conclusion of the Benzino and Murder Inc beefs." Pitchfork was also positive, calling it:

a public hand-wringing over the feuds that Em and 50 Cent have been drawn into, the consequences of these battles, and-- most importantly-- the toll they've taken, both physically and emotionally. The martial beat is a bit heavy-handed, but it's counterbalanced by the pleasantly surprising chorus' sample of Martika's "Toy Soldiers", perhaps a nod to either Kanye's helium-vocaled samples or the 00s trend toward trance-pop covers of 80s hits.

NME wrote a favorable review:

'Like Toy Soldiers' is a case in point. The best track of this album, and probably any album this year, it should be appalling. It interpolates (by which we mean 'steals') the chorus to a long-forgotten '80s power ballad by Martika, which would be a surefire route to disaster in anyone else's hands. Instead, with its martial drumbeat, unashamedly vast-scale soft rock dynamics and that similarly monolithic chorus, it is perhaps hip-hop's first genuine lighters-in-the-air stadium anthem. And yet it's probably the most personal track on the album...as Em tries to draw a line under the various beefs he and his cohorts have been embroiled in. "Even though the battle was won/I feel like we lost it/I spent [so much energy] on it/Honestly I'm exhausted", he admits. If the sheer volume and widescreen sweep of 'Like Toy Soldiers' is a cover for this exhaustion, then it sure works.

Rolling Stone Magazine described: "it's really mature, as when the Martika-sampling "Like Toy Soldiers" renounces battle rhyming and its deadly consequences." USA Today noted: "A military drumbeat drives Like Toy Soldiers, in which Eminem offers an explanation for his beef with the Murder Inc. rap clique, The Source magazine and its rapper/owner Benzino, and his part in a dispute between 50 Cent and Ja Rule. He seems to wish none of it had ever happened, and he's ready to move on." RapReviews was less positive: "Continuing to wring out sympathy from his tear-soaked towel of a life, Eminem doubles-up with "Like Toy Soldiers," another self-produced, self-sorry introspection on the Slim Shady saga." The Guardian was happy of sampling: "Like Toy Soldiers, about Ja Rule and Benzino, is similarly brilliant. Set to the album's one genuinely fantastic backing track, involving a military drumbeat and a sample from Martika's forgotten 1980s hit Toy Soldiers, its lyrics switch from truce-calling to belligerent indignation and back again, often in the space of one line." The New York Times described:

"[Like] Toy Soldiers," scheduled to be the next single, recycles the 1980s pop hit by Martika so that Eminem can rehash his beefs with Ja Rule and the Source. But the vitriol is mainly gone, and he sounds sad and clear-eyed, ending the rhyme by proposing a truce: "It's not a plea that I'm coppin'/I'm just willing to be the bigger man/If y'all can [quiet] poppin'/Off at the jaws [with the knockin'],/'Cause frankly I'm sick of talkin'/I'm not gonna let someone else's coffin/Rest on my conscience."

Stylus Magazine, however, is slightly negative: "perhaps you don't mind that Em ruins maybe the best musical moment on the record, the Martika interpolation of "Like Toy Soldiers", just so he can recapitulate ad nauseum [sic] the details of his pitiful n-word controversy (and somehow indirectly blame Afrocentrism for his youthful idiocy)." Entertainment Weekly was very critical of the song: "Instead of addressing other matters that extend beyond his immediate universe, he wastes time attacking his sworn enemies at The Source [in both 'Like Toy Soldiers' and 'Yellow Brick Road']." The Boston Phoenix called it a "self-knowing anti-anthem". SPIN, however, seemed to put the song in a different light: "On 'Like Toy Soldiers,' over a stirring, 'Jesus Walks'-style loop of Martika's doleful '80s hit, Eminem brings light, not heat, to a couple years' worth of beefs, from 50 Cent's feud with the Murder Inc. crew to Em's conflict with rapper Benzino and The Source's edit staff, stating his case while resisting the urge to pour gas on any fires."

== Music video ==
Directed by The Saline Project (Adam Toht and Justin Francis) and released on December 3, 2004. A tribute to deceased D12 member Bugz, the video features a dramatized version of the events that lead to Bugz's death.

The song's video starts with two young boys in a living room. Out of boredom, one of the boys grabs a book called "Toy Soldiers" and says "I got this book, my dad gave it to me." As they open it up, the song's lyrics are on the page and the camera zooms into the book which quickly brings the viewers into the action of the video. It begins at the hospital where Eminem and his circle are watching, in despair, as doctors are trying to save Bugz (played by fellow D12 member Proof).

Eminem is first seen in a series of scenes rapping the song in a deserted alleyway, before the video goes through a series of scenes showing the various feuds mentioned in the song. They include seeing the news, rappers battling in studios, and street encounters.

Towards the end, Eminem cuts his recording as everything freezes in time. Walking out of the studio, Eminem stands shocked seeing the drive-by shooting of Bugz. It switches back to the hospital, where Bugz dies, and finishes at his funeral where a multi-ethnic choir of children start to sing.

Cameo appearances in the video include 50 Cent, Luis Resto, Dr. Dre, Obie Trice, and D12. Deceased rappers including Tupac Shakur, The Notorious B.I.G., Big L, and Bugz are also shown via animation at the end of the music video to show the fatal consequences of rap wars.

In a case of life imitating art, Proof himself was shot and killed on April 11, 2006, after an altercation broke out at a nightclub in Detroit, Michigan. "In the year after [Proof] died," Eminem said in his memoir The Way I Am, "I would stare at the ceiling and think about that video. Did karma cause that to happen in real life? Did I? You always want to point the finger at somebody else when something like that happens, you know?"

== Track listing ==
Digital download
No.	Title	Writer(s)	Producer(s)	Length
1.	"Like Toy Soldiers"	Marshall Mathers; Luis Resto; Marta Marrero; Michael Jay Margules	Marshall Mathers; Luis Resto^{[a]}	4:56
2.	"Just Lose It" (DJ Green Lantern remix)	Mathers; Andre Young; Mike Elizondo; Mark Batson; Chris Pope	Dr. Dre; Mike Elizondo	3:30
Total length:				8:26

Digital EP
No.	Title	Writer(s)	Producer(s)	Length
1.	"Like Toy Soldiers"	Marshall Mathers; Luis Resto; Marta Marrero; Michael Jay Margules	Marshall Mathers; Luis Resto^{[a]}	4:56
2.	"Rabbit Run" (soundtrack version)	Mathers; Resto	Eminem; Resto^{[a]}	3:10
3.	"Like Toy Soldiers" (instrumental)	Mathers; Resto; Marrero; Margules	Eminem; Resto^{[a]}	4:43
Total length:				12:49

UK CD1
No.	Title	Writer(s)	Producer(s)	Length
1.	"Like Toy Soldiers"	Marshall Mathers; Luis Resto; Marta Marrero; Michael Jay Margules	Marshall Mathers; Luis Resto^{[a]}	4:56
2.	"Rabbit Run" (soundtrack version)	Mathers; Resto	Eminem; Resto^{[a]}	3:10
Total length:				8:06

UK CD2
No.	Title	Writer(s)	Producer(s)	Length
1.	"Like Toy Soldiers"	Marshall Mathers; Luis Resto; Marta Marrero; Michael Jay Margules	Marshall Mathers; Luis Resto^{[a]}	4:56
2.	"Rabbit Run" (soundtrack version)	Mathers; Resto	Eminem; Resto^{[a]}	3:10
3.	"Like Toy Soldiers" (instrumental)	Mathers; Resto; Marrero; Margules	Eminem; Resto^{[a]}	4:43
4.	"Like Toy Soldiers" (music video)	Mathers; Resto; Marrero; Margules	Eminem; Resto^{[a]}	4:56
Total length:				17:45

UK DVD
No.	Title	Writer(s)	Producer(s)	Length
3.	"Like Toy Soldiers"	Marshall Mathers; Luis Resto; Marta Marrero; Michael Jay Margules	Marshall Mathers; Luis Resto^{[a]}	4:56
4.	"Like Toy Soldiers" (making of the video)	Mathers; Resto; Marrero; Margules	Mathers; Resto^{[a]}	3:00
Total length:				7:56

German CD Single
No.	Title	Writer(s)	Producer(s)	Length
1.	"Like Toy Soldiers"	Marshall Mathers; Luis Resto; Marta Marrero; Michael Jay Margules	Marshall Mathers; Luis Resto^{[a]}	4:56
2.	"Just Lose It" (DJ Green Lantern remix)	Mathers; Andre Young; Mike Elizondo; Mark Batson; Chris Pope	Dr. Dre; Mike Elizondo	3:30
3.	"Like Toy Soldiers" (instrumental)	Eminem; Resto^{[a]}	Eminem; Resto^{[a]}	4:43
4.	"Like Toy Soldiers" (Music Video)	Eminem; Resto^{[a]}	Eminem; Resto^{[a]}	4:56
Total length:				18:05

UK CD2
No.	Title	Writer(s)	Producer(s)	Length
1.	"Like Toy Soldiers"	Marshall Mathers; Luis Resto; Marta Marrero; Michael Jay Margules	Marshall Mathers; Luis Resto^{[a]}	4:56
2.	"Just Lose It" (DJ Green Lantern remix)	Mathers; Andre Young; Mike Elizondo; Mark Batson; Chris Pope	Dr. Dre; Mike Elizondo	3:30
Total length:				8:26

Notes

- ^{^[a]} signifies an additional producer.

== Charts ==
=== Weekly charts ===
Chart (2005)	Peak position
Australia (ARIA)	4
Australian Urban (ARIA)	3
Austria (Ö3 Austria Top 40)	8
Belgium (Ultratop 50 Flanders)	11
Belgium (Ultratop 50 Wallonia)	18
Brazil (ABPD)	16
Canada (Nielsen SoundScan)	21
Canada CHR/Pop Top 30 (Radio & Records)	30
Czech Republic (IFPI)	3
Denmark (Tracklisten)	2
Eurochart Hot 100 (Billboard)	1
Finland (Suomen virallinen lista)	15
France (SNEP)	34
Germany (Media Control AG)	8
Greece (IFPI)	6
Hungary (Editors' Choice Top 40)	17
Hungary (Single Top 40)	6
Ireland (IRMA)	3
Italy (FIMI)	8
Netherlands (Dutch Top 40)	7
Netherlands (Single Top 100)	8
New Zealand (RIANZ)	2
Norway (VG-lista)	4
Scottish Singles Sales (Official Charts)	1
Sweden (Sverigetopplistan)	14
Switzerland (Schweizer Hitparade)	3
UK Singles (Official Charts)	1
UK Hip Hop/R&B (Official Charts)	1
US Billboard Hot 100	34
US Pop Songs (Billboard)	24
US Hot R&B/Hip-Hop Songs (Billboard)	64
US Pop 100 (Billboard)	24

=== Year-end charts ===
Chart (2005)	Position
Australia (ARIA)	63
Austria (Ö3 Austria Top 40)	61
Belgium (Ultratop 50 Flanders)	84
Germany (Official German Charts)	74
Netherlands (Dutch Top 40)	27
Netherlands (Single Top 100)	91
New Zealand (Recorded Music NZ)	34
Sweden (Sverigetopplistan)	81
Switzerland (Schweizer Hitparade)	51
UK Singles (Official Charts Company)	45

== Certifications ==
Region	Certification	Certified units/sales
Australia (ARIA)	4× Platinum	280,000^{‡}
Brazil (Pro-Música Brasil)	Gold	30,000^{‡}
Denmark (IFPI Danmark)	Gold	45,000^{‡}
Germany (BVMI)	Gold	150,000^{‡}
New Zealand (RMNZ)	2× Platinum	60,000^{‡}
United Kingdom (BPI)	Platinum	600,000^{‡}
United States (RIAA)	3× Platinum	3,000,000^{‡}
^{‡} Sales+streaming figures based on certification alone.

== See also ==
- List of UK Singles Chart number ones of the 2000s
