= Coloured Kisses =

1992 single by Martika

Single by Martika

from the album Martika's Kitchen
- B-side: "Pride & Prejudice"
- Released: February 10, 1992
- Length: 4:07
- Label: Columbia
- Songwriters: Frankie Blue; Les Pierce; Martika
- Producers: Robert Clivillés; David Cole

Martika singles chronology
"Martika's Kitchen" (1991)	"Coloured Kisses" (1992)	"Safe in the Arms of Love" (1993)

Limited edition
- Special limited edition red vinyl Valentine pack

Music video
- "Coloured Kisses" on YouTube

"Coloured Kisses" is a song by American singer-songwriter and actress Martika, released in February 1992 by Columbia Records as the third single from her second album, Martika's Kitchen (1991). It is co-written by Martika with Frankie Blue and Les Pierce and produced by Robert Clivillés and David Cole of C+C Music Factory. The single did not chart in the US, and achieved minor chart positions in other countries. In the United Kingdom, a limited Valentine edition was released on a red 7-inch vinyl. The accompanying music video (directed by Rocky Schenck and edited by Scott C. Wilson) shows Martika in very provocative scenes while being in a bath tub and interacting with her boyfriend (portrayed by Harold Pruett).

== Track listings ==
- 7-inch single

A. "Coloured Kisses" (7-inch edit) (Frankie Blue, Les Pierce, Martika)
B. "Pride & Prejudice" (Michael Cruz, Martika)

- CD single
1. "Coloured Kisses" (7-inch edit) (Frankie Blue, Les Pierce, Martika) – 4:07
2. "Coloured Kisses" (remix) (Frankie Blue, Les Pierce, Martika) – 4:58
3. "Pride & Prejudice" (Michael Cruz, Martika) – 5:11

== Charts ==
Chart (1992)	Peak position
Australia (ARIA)	39
Germany (GfK)	83
UK Singles (OCC)	41
UK Airplay (Music Week)	15
