= Martika's Kitchen (song) =

1991 single by Martika

Single by Martika

from the album Martika's Kitchen
- B-side: "Broken Heart"
- Released: November 11, 1991
- Length: 4:12
- Label: Columbia
- Songwriter: Prince
- Producer: Prince

Martika singles chronology
"Love... Thy Will Be Done" (1991)	"Martika's Kitchen" (1991)	"Coloured Kisses" (1992)

Music video
- "Martika's Kitchen" on YouTube

"Martika's Kitchen" is the second single and title track released from American singer-songwriter and actress Martika's 1991 album of the same name, written and produced by Prince. It was released in November 1991 by Columbia Records. Although the song did not replicate the success of "Love... Thy Will Be Done" in the United States, stalling at number 93 on the Billboard Hot 100, it was more successful internationally, peaking within the top 30 in Australia, Ireland, New Zealand, Sweden and the United Kingdom.

== Charts ==
Chart (1991–1992)	Peak position
Australia (ARIA)	29
Belgium (Ultratop 50 Flanders)	40
Canada Top Singles (RPM)	34
Europe (Eurochart Hot 100)	52
European Hit Radio (Music & Media)	10
European Dance Radio (Music & Media)	17
Germany (GfK)	40
Ireland (IRMA)	24
Luxembourg (Radio Luxembourg)	5
Netherlands (Dutch Top 40)	38
Netherlands (Single Top 100)	38
New Zealand (Recorded Music NZ)	23
Sweden (Sverigetopplistan)	21
UK Singles (Official Charts)	17
UK Airplay (Music Week)	6
US Billboard Hot 100	93
US Cash Box Top 100	74
Zimbabwe (ZIMA)	1

== Release history ==
Region	Date	Format(s)	Label(s)	Ref.
Australia	November 11, 1991	CD; cassette	Columbia	
United Kingdom	November 18, 1991	7-inch vinyl; 12-inch vinyl; CD; cassette	Columbia	
Japan	November 21, 1991	Mini-CD	Sony	

== Samples ==
Prince sampled the song on his cover of Joan Osbourne's song "One of Us".
