= Toy Soldiers (song) =

1989 single by Martika

- Artwork for European releases

Single by Martika

from the album Martika
- B-side: "Exchange of Hearts"; "It's Not What You're Doing"
- Released: April 26, 1989
- Genre: Pop rock
- Length: 4:47 (album version); 4:23 (single version)
- Label: Columbia
- Songwriters: Martika; Michael Jay
- Producer: Michael Jay

Martika singles chronology
"More Than You Know" (1988)	"Toy Soldiers" (1989)	"I Feel the Earth Move" (1989)

Music video
- "Toy Soldiers" on YouTube

"Toy Soldiers" is a song by American singer-songwriter Martika. It was released as the second single from her debut album, Martika (1988), on April 26, 1989. The song is her only number-one single in the United States, reaching number one on the Billboard Hot 100 for two weeks in mid-1989. It was an international hit as well, reaching number one in New Zealand and entering the top five in nine other countries. An edited version of the song is included in the imported version of the album Toy Soldiers: The Best of Martika. Its music video was directed by Jim Shea.

== Background ==
Martika wrote the song about a friend who was battling a cocaine addiction. "I was a little hesitant because I had only written two songs before and they were light songs. I came up to Michael and said I wanted to write about drugs. It was the first time I got the nerve to write about something that was scary for me to talk about, so I did." According to an episode of VH-1's Pop-Up Video, in which "Toy Soldiers" was featured, the friend in question eventually conquered the addiction.

== Chart performance ==
The song spent two weeks at number one on the US Billboard Hot 100 and in New Zealand while peaking within the top ten of the charts in both Australia and the United Kingdom. On Billboard's year-end chart for 1989, "Toy Soldiers" placed number 29. It was Martika's only number-one single in the US, and her highest-ranking single in the United Kingdom. The single was certified gold in the United States by the Recording Industry Association of America (RIAA).

In March and April 2009, VH1 ran a countdown of the 100 Greatest One-Hit Wonders of the 80s. "Toy Soldiers" placed at number 67 on the countdown, although Martika had three other top 40 hits: "More Than You Know" (number 18); "I Feel the Earth Move" (number 25); and "Love... Thy Will Be Done" (number 10).

== Critical reception ==
Bryan Buss of AllMusic (AMG) retrospectively reviewed the Martika album, stating "the big hit single, 'Toy Soldiers', works with its childlike vocals and lyrics, creating a haunting, effective dichotomy with its subject of drug addiction." Buss also highlighted the song as an album standout by labeling it an AMG Pick Track. Another editor, Rob Theakston, labeled the song as an AMG Pick Track on the 2005 compilation Toy Soldiers: The Best of Martika. Harriet Dell from Smash Hits wrote, "It's a lovely song nevertheless, with a catchy nursery rhyme chorus sung by lots of cissy voiced kids".

== Music video ==
The accompanying music video for the song was directed by Jim Shea, who later became a regular in directing country music videos. Martika is seen singing with a waterfall in front of her (this was done by filming her in an empty pool with a water current flowing between her and the camera). As of February 16, 2024, the video has over a hundred million views on YouTube.

== Track listings ==
- 7-inch single
1. "Toy Soldiers" – 4:52
2. "Exchange of Hearts" – 4:15
- 3-inch single
1. "Toy Soldiers" – 4:52
2. "Exchange of Hearts" – 4:15
3. "It's Not What You're Doing" – 4:11
- 12-inch single
1. "Toy Soldiers" – 4:52
2. "It's Not What You're Doing" – 4:11
3. "Exchange of Hearts" – 4:15

== Charts ==
=== Weekly charts ===
Chart (1988–1990)	Peak position
Australia (ARIA)	5
Belgium (Ultratop 50 Flanders)	32
Canada Top Singles (RPM)	4
Canada Adult Contemporary (RPM)	9
Canada Retail Singles (RPM)	3
Europe (Eurochart Hot 100)	6
Finland (Suomen virallinen lista)	4
Ireland (IRMA)	3
Netherlands (Dutch Top 40)	17
Netherlands (Single Top 100)	22
New Zealand (Recorded Music NZ)	1
Norway (VG-lista)	2
Quebec (ADISQ)	6
Spain (AFYVE)	10
Sweden (Sverigetopplistan)	4
Switzerland (Schweizer Hitparade)	3
UK Singles (Official Charts)	5
US Billboard Hot 100	1
US Adult Contemporary (Billboard)	37
US Cash Box Top 100	4
West Germany (GfK)	5

=== Year-end charts ===
Chart (1989)	Position
Australia (ARIA)	30
Canada Top Singles (RPM)	21
Europe (Eurochart Hot 100)	44
New Zealand (RIANZ)	29
Switzerland (Schweizer Hitparade)	23
UK Singles (OCC)	62
US Billboard Hot 100	29
West Germany (Media Control)	73

== Certifications ==
Region	Certification	Certified units/sales
Australia (ARIA)	Platinum	70,000^{^}
Canada (Music Canada)	Gold	50,000^{^}
New Zealand (RMNZ)	Gold	15,000^{‡}
Sweden (GLF)	Gold	25,000^{^}
United Kingdom (BPI)	Silver	200,000^{^}
United States (RIAA)	Gold	500,000^{^}
^{^} Shipments figures based on certification alone.^{‡} Sales+streaming figures based on certification alone.

== Release history ==
Region	Version	Date	Format(s)	Label(s)	Ref.
United States	Original	April 26, 1989	7-inch vinyl; cassette	Columbia	
United Kingdom	Original	July 3, 1989	7-inch vinyl; 12-inch vinyl; CD	CBS	
Japan	Japanese	December 1, 1989	CD	CBS/Sony	

== Cover versions and sampling ==
- Martika recorded and produced a Spanish version of "Toy Soldiers" renaming it "Como Un Juguete", though it was not as successful as the original English version. She also recorded the song in Japanese.
- Eminem's 2005 single "Like Toy Soldiers" features samples from "Toy Soldiers". A sample of Martika's singing the chorus is used as the chorus of the Eminem version. The subject of the Eminem song is markedly different from the Martika song, concerning violence and murder linked to rap music rather than drug addiction. The sample is played faster than the original version with an added drum beat. The final chorus of Martika's song is used as the chorus of Eminem's version.
- In the 2022 film M3GAN, the title character, a robot humanoid utilizing advanced artificial intelligence, plays "Toy Soldiers" on the piano before confronting her creator.

== See also ==
- List of Billboard Hot 100 number-one singles of 1989
