= More Than You Know (Martika song) =

Single by Martika

from the album Martika
- B-side: "Alibis"
- Released: November 1988 (US); January 1, 1990 (UK re-release)
- Genre: Dance-pop; freestyle
- Length: 4:11
- Label: Columbia
- Songwriter(s): Martika, Michael Jay, Marvin Morrow
- Producer(s): Michael Jay

Martika singles chronology
"More Than You Know" (1988)	"Toy Soldiers" (1989)

Music video
- "Martika - More Than You Know" on YouTube

"More Than You Know" is the first single released from Martika's eponymous debut album. "More Than You Know" debuted on the Billboard Hot 100 on the chart dated December 24, 1988, and peaked at No. 18. The single was released in Europe and Australasia in January 1990, and reached the top 40 in the UK (No. 15), Ireland, and Australia.

== Track listings ==
UK 12"

1. "More Than You Know" (dance mix part I) – 6:10
2. "More Than You Know" (dub mix part II) – 2:06
3. "More Than You Know" (house mix part I) – 6:06
4. "More Than You Know" (house mix part II) – 5:04

UK 7"

1. "More Than You Know" (7" remix) – 4:04
2. "More Than You Know" (Spanish version)

UK 7" version 2

1. "More Than You Know" (single version)
2. "Alibis" (backing track)

Japan 7"

1. "More Than You Know" (single version)
2. "Alibis"

Austria 3" CD

1. "More Than You Know" (dance mix) – 6:10
2. "Toy Soldiers" (Spanish version, "Como Un Juguete") – 4:44
3. "More Than You Know" (Spanish version, "Quiero Entregarte Mi Amor") – 4:12

== Charts ==
Chart (1988–1990)	Peak position
Canadian RPM Top Singles Chart	47
US Billboard Hot 100	18
US Dance/Club Play Singles	12
US Hot Dance Music Sales	33
Australian Singles Chart	32
Irish Singles Chart	10
UK Singles (OCC)	15
Europe (Eurochart Hot 100)	38
