= Martika =

American singer (born 1969)

- Born: Marta Marrero; May 18, 1969 (age 57); Whittier, California, U.S.
- Other name: Martika
- Known for: Toy Soldiers; More Than You Know; I Feel the Earth Move; Love... Thy Will Be Done; Martika's Kitchen
- Spouse: Nikki (m. 2001)
- Musical career
- Genres: Pop, dance-pop, pop rock
- Occupations: Singer, actress
- Years active: 1982–1992, 2000–present
- Labels: Columbia Records; Dunda Chief Records
- Website: martikamartika.com

Marta Marrero (born May 18, 1969), better known professionally as Martika (/mɑːrˈtiːkə/ mahr-TEE-kə), is an American singer and actress. She began her career as an actress, playing the role of teen Gloria in the television program Kids Incorporated between 1984 and 1986. Following her appearance in the show, Martika signed a recording contract with Columbia Records. Over her career, she scored three US top 20 hits. In October 1988, her self-titled debut album was released. It spawned the hit single "Toy Soldiers", which peaked at number one on the US Billboard Hot 100 for two weeks. The song received commercial success in other international territories, and received a gold certification from the Recording Industry Association of America. Other singles released from the album include "More Than You Know" (peaking in the US top 20), "I Feel the Earth Move" and "Water". The album has sold over three million copies worldwide.

Her second, and only other, studio album, Martika's Kitchen (1991), failed to match the commercial success achieved by the album Martika. However, it did spawn one US top ten hit with "Love... Thy Will Be Done" (her second US top 10 hit and her third top 20 hit). A minor hit was seen in the single "Martika's Kitchen". Another single, "Coloured Kisses", failed to chart in the US, but was a minor hit in Germany, the United Kingdom, and Australia. The album was certified gold by both the Australian Recording Industry Association and British Phonographic Industry. Martika's Kitchen is estimated to have sold one million copies worldwide. In 1992, she left the music industry after the perceived underperformance of her second album and the pressure of the industry, citing burnout.

Martika returned to the music industry in 2000, forming the band Oppera with her husband Nikki. In 2005, her single "Toy Soldiers" was sampled on the song "Like Toy Soldiers" by American rapper Eminem, with Martika credited as one of the songwriters. In 2012, her first solo single since 1993 was released, "Flow With the Go", via DCR Records, which originally was intended to serve as the lead single from a third album, titled Mirror Ball. However, the album was eventually shelved.

== Early life, family and education ==
Martika was born in Whittier, California, to Cuban parents Gil Marrero and Marta of Spaniard ancestry. She has a brother, Marki Marrero.

== Career ==
=== Kids Incorporated (1983–1988) ===
She entered mainstream show business in an uncredited role as one of the girls in the 1982 motion picture Annie. This led to her being cast as Gloria on the long-running children's show Kids Incorporated as one of a group of neighborhood children who rise to local fame by singing staged productions at a corner malt shop. Once the second season began, she formally adopted her stage name Martika Marrero before shortening it to the mononym Martika, which she has used ever since. Martika and many other Kids Incorporated cast members were featured in the musical numbers from the Mr. T motivational video Be Somebody... or Be Somebody's Fool! in 1984.

Following her role in Kids Incorporated and Be Somebody, Martika was signed by Columbia Records. Her first solo release was released only in Japan: "We are Music" was recorded to promote Sony cassette tapes in the Japanese market, where the song was released in 12", 7" and CD formats.

In 1987, Martika recorded a version of the Michael Jay/Gregory Smith song "Bounce Back", which included a music video which was aired on Entertainment '80, although it was not available for purchase.

=== Rise to prominence and Martika (1988–1991) ===
Her debut album, Martika (1988), reached number fifteen on the US Billboard 200 albums chart. The album spawned the internationally successful single "Toy Soldiers", which she co-wrote with her producer Michael Jay and it became a top-5 hit in the United Kingdom, Ireland, Germany, and Australia. In the US, "Toy Soldiers" spent two weeks at No. 1 in 1989. "Toy Soldiers" also went to No. 1 in New Zealand.

Two additional singles were released from Martika, and also charted within the top forty in the United States – "More Than You Know" and "I Feel the Earth Move" which reached No. 18 and No. 25 on the Billboard Hot 100 respectively. "I Feel the Earth Move" is a cover version of Carole King's song from her album Tapestry. Both of the singles also peaked within the top twenty on the US Dance charts and the UK Singles Chart. "I Feel the Earth Move" also reached the top 10 in Australia. New Zealand, and Ireland. A fourth and final single from the album, "Water", entered the lower regions of the UK and Australian charts. "Water" is partially sung in Spanish, a homage to Martika's Cuban ancestry. Other songs were re-recorded fully in Spanish for international release.

The album was certified platinum in the UK in 1990, and double platinum in Australia. In the United States, the Recording Industry Association of America awarded Martika a Gold certification, indicating sales in excess of 500,000 copies. In 1990, Martika co-wrote the track "Kiss Me Quick" with Michael Jay and Marvin Morrow. The track was recorded by freestyle/pop singer Alisha for her 1990 album Bounce Back, with Martika contributing backing vocals. Martika has since sold over three million copies internationally since its initial release.

=== Martika's Kitchen and hiatus (1991–2000) ===
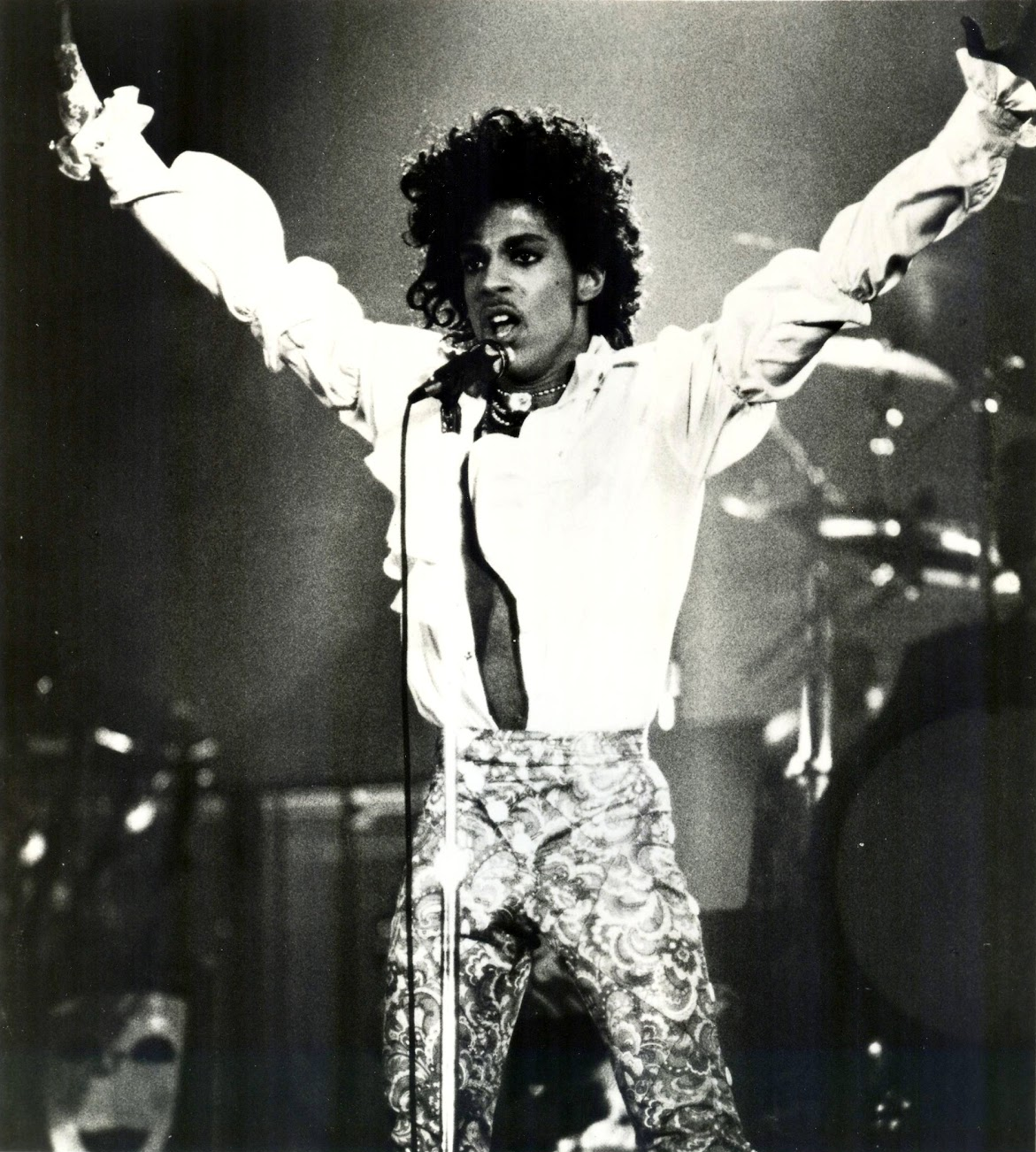
Prince served as one of the producers and songwriters for Martika's Kitchen

Martika was encouraged by her agent to combine her love of film and music by scoring soundtracks and, in 1990, she wrote and recorded the song "Blue Eyes Are Sensitive to the Light" for the soundtrack to the film Arachnophobia. The producers of the album did not like her vocals, so the song was re-recorded by Sara Hickman for the film. The song has also been recorded by Brazilian singers Deborah Blando (on her 1991 debut, A Different Story), Elba Ramalho, and Frances Ruffelle.

In 1991, Martika approached Prince to do some new tracks. Among these was her second (and last) US Top-10 single, "Love... Thy Will Be Done", which also became a Top-10 hit in the UK and reached No. 1 in Australia. "Love... Thy Will Be Done" started out as a prayer written by Martika, and Prince then changed it into a song.

Her second album, Martika's Kitchen, peaked at No. 111 on the Billboard Top Albums chart. The title track received only minor airplay in the US, and reached No. 93 on Billboard Hot 100 chart. However, the album was a bigger success abroad, though on a lesser scale than her debut. It peaked at No. 15 in the UK Albums Chart, No. 9 in Australia, and spawned further hits with the songs "Coloured Kisses" and the title track, "Martika's Kitchen". "Temptation", another track from this album, was covered by Patti LaBelle on her album Burnin'. Martika played the role of the lounge singer Dahlia Mendez in the crime drama TV series Wiseguy in 1990, opposite Steven Bauer who took over from Ken Wahl for the fourth and final season.

She eventually faded from the public eye in 1992 after walking away from the music industry, due to burnout and feeling overwhelmed with the burden of fame. In 1997, a greatest hits compilation album, The Best of Martika: More Than You Know was released.

=== Return to music and Oppera (2000–2011) ===
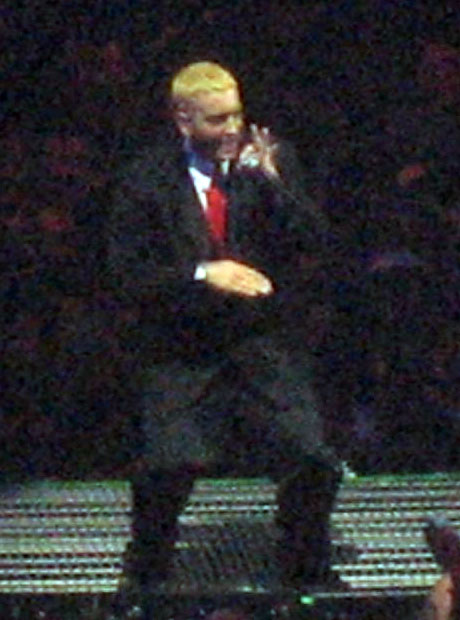
Rapper Eminem heavily sampled "Toy Soldiers" on his 2005 single "Like Toy Soldiers", crediting Martika as a songwriter

During the 2000 explosion of Latin pop, Martika sang backing vocals on various projects and contributed lyrics to releases by other artists, although she failed to receive any major-label attention for herself. Instead, she built martika.net in 2001, a website for her fans, and released a remix of a newly self-recorded song, "The Journey". She also recorded a track "Monday" for a new solo album which the website stated was on its way. Eventually, however, her website was shut down and the album never materialized.

In 2003, Martika and her husband, musician Michael Mozart, formed the band Oppera. Adopting a Latin pop sound, she and Mozart released Oppera's debut album, Violince, in 2004. Rapper Eminem used a sample of her biggest US hit, "Toy Soldiers", for "Like Toy Soldiers", a track on his 2004 album Encore and featured Martika on the chorus of the track. In response, Martika's British greatest hits album was repackaged with its title altered to Toy Soldiers: The Best of Martika. A biography was added to the album insert reflecting the new Eminem sample, though it asserted that she had not released any albums since Martika's Kitchen.

Oppera released a self-titled second album in 2005. Martika promoted Oppera's release with a Borders bookstore tour. In 2010, Martika, using the stage name Vida Edit, starred as Lolly Pop and co-produced a web-based television action program J8ded.

=== Mirror Ball and touring (2011–present) ===
In October 2011, Martika stopped using the stage name Vida Edit and launched a new personal website. A year later, she announced an Australian tour, but it was canceled. She performed in 2014 alongside Debbie Gibson, Samantha Fox, and Rick Astley at a HitParade Festival in Chile. In 2012, she released "Flow With the Go" via DCR Records. This was her first solo single release since "Safe in the Arms of Love", which had been released as the last single from Martika's Kitchen; it was also (other than a remixed, promotional-only release of "Spirit") the last single she released during her initial musical career. Despite her first single release in over twenty years, Martika did express doubts about a "full musical comeback", citing "changes to the music industry" and claimed she is "not really basically career-driven like I was back when I was a teenager", claiming that she "just sort of become like a happy housewife". The release of "Flow With the Go" was supported by an Australian tour in 2012.

The single was originally intended to serve as the lead single from her third studio album, Mirror Ball. Originally intended to be an album release consisting of purely new material, Martika spent a considerable amount of months in the recording studio engaging in the recording and songwriting process, however, as a result of the death of a "close family member", Mirror Ball was subsequently shelved.

In July 2016, she was part of the Totally 80s Tour of Australia. The concerts included seven international 1980s acts, including Martika, Berlin, Limahl of Kajagoogoo, Paul Lekakis, Katrina of Katrina and the Waves, Men Without Hats and Stacey Q. For her performance at the tour, she received positive reviews from the Australian press. She claimed that touring was an entirely new concept for her, citing the fact she had been out of the music industry for the past 25 years and had not performed any of her songs since then. Speaking about the Australian tour, she claimed that it was a "fresh experience for me" to "wake the songs up" after a considerably long period of time.

== Personal life ==
As of 2016, Martika lives in Dayton, Ohio, with her husband, musician Nikki, concentrating on married life.

== Discography ==
- Martika (1988)
- Martika's Kitchen (1991)

== Filmography ==
Film
Year	Title	Role	Notes
1982	Annie	Dancer	Uncredited
1984	Breakin' 2: Electric Boogaloo	Kid	as Marta Marrero
1984	Kids Incorporated: The Beginning	Gloria	as Marta Marrero; Video
1984	Be Somebody... or Be Somebody's Fool!	Marta	as The Dimples; Video
1998	Exposé	Self	
2001	Route 10	Penny	
Television
Year	Title	Role	Notes
1984-1986	Kids Incorporated	Gloria	65 episodes
1985	Hardcastle and McCormick	Luisa Montega	Episode: "You're Sixteen, You're Beautiful, and You're His"
1986	One Big Family	Natasha	Episode: "Kate's Friend"
1986	Kids Incorporated: Rock in the New Year	Gloria	TV movie
1987	Silver Spoons	Kiki	Episode: "Band on the Run"
1990	The Little and Large Show		Episode 10.1
1990	Wiseguy	Dahlia Mendez	6 episodes
Music videos
Year	Title	Role	Notes
1989	Toy Soldiers	Martika	
1989	I Feel the Earth Move	Martika	
1991	Love... Thy Will Be Done	Martika	
1992	Coloured Kisses	Martika	

== Awards and nominations ==
Award	Year	Nominee(s)	Category	Result	Ref.
ASCAP Pop Music Awards	1990	"Toy Soldiers"	Most Performed Song	Won	
Smash Hits Poll Winners Party	1989	Herself	Most Fanciable Female	Nominated	
Smash Hits Poll Winners Party	1989	Herself	Most Promising New Solo Artist	Nominated	
Smash Hits Poll Winners Party	1991	Herself	Well-Dressed Person	Nominated	
Smash Hits Poll Winners Party	1991	Herself	Best Female Solo Singer	Nominated	
Smash Hits Poll Winners Party	1991	Herself	Worst Female Solo Singer	Nominated	
Smash Hits Poll Winners Party	1991	"Love... Thy Will Be Done"	Best Single	Nominated	
