= Michael Jay (producer) =

American songwriter and record producer (born 1959)

- Born: Michael Jay Margules; December 17, 1959 (age 66)
- Occupations: Songwriter, record producer
- Known for: Collaboration with Martika
- Website: michaeljaysongs.com

Michael Jay (born Michael Jay Margules; December 17, 1959) is an American songwriter, record producer, and studio owner. He is best known for his collaborations with Martika. He has also worked with Celine Dion and Kylie Minogue, among others.

== Selected songwriting/production discography ==
- Five Star – Silk & Steel (1986)
- Fire on Blonde – "Bounce Back" (1987) (single)
- Eighth Wonder – "Cross My Heart" (1988) (single)
- Martika – Martika (1988)
- Peter Allen – Making Every Moment Count (1990)
- Alisha – Bounce Back (1990)
- Kylie Minogue – Rhythm of Love (1990)
- Seiko Matsuda – Seiko (1990)
- Five Star – Shine (1991)
- Keedy – Chase the Clouds (1991)
- Brenda K. Starr – By Heart (1991)
- Indecent Obsession – "Fixing a Broken Heart" (1993) (single)
- Evelyn "Champagne" King – I'll Keep a Light On (1995)
