= Juliet Angus =

Television Personality (born 1976)

- Born: Juliet Bernadette Rogulewski; November 25, 1975 (age 50); Chicago, Illinois, U.S.
- Education: University of Southern California (BA)
- Occupation: reality television personality
- Years active: 2002–present
- Television: Ladies of London (2014–2017); The Real Housewives of London (2025–present)
- Spouse: Gregor Angus (m. 2007)
- Children: 2
- Website: julietangus.com

Juliet Bernadette Angus (née Rogulewski; born November 25, 1975) is a reality television personality. She is known as an original main cast member on the Bravo reality television series Ladies of London (2014–2017) and the Hayu reality television series The Real Housewives of London (2025–present).

== Early life ==
Juliet Bernadette Rogulewski was born in Chicago, Illinois on November 25, 1976, as the daughter to Maciej Rogulewski and his wife, Dorota (née Sienkiewicz). She has three siblings, two sisters and a brother. Her parents had emigrated from Poland to Chicago.

Angus graduated from the University of Southern California with her Bachelor of Arts degree in journalism, before working in television production in New York City.

== Career ==
Angus appeared on an episode in the first season of the Rich Eisen-hosted ESPN reality television series Beg, Borrow & Deal in 2002. The following year, she made her acting debut with an unknown role in Diva Detectives. She was credited under her maiden name.

Angus rose to prominence as an original main cast member on the Bravo reality television series Ladies of London. The first season ran from June 2 to July 21, 2014, with Caprice Bourret, Marissa Hermer, Annabelle Neilson, Noelle Reno, and Caroline Stanbury. The second season ran from September 7 to November 9, 2015, with Caroline Fleming and Julie Montagu, Viscountess Hinchingbrooke. The third season ran from November 29, 2016 to February 7, 2017, with Sophie Stanbury.

Angus is a stylist and former fashion publicist. She became a consultant for top international brands, working with top fashion designers and public figures to create memorable red carpet looks and wardrobes.

Angus appeared on the Bravo pop culture-based late-night talk show Watch What Happens Live with Andy Cohen on July 21, 2014. She appeared alongside The Real Housewives of Orange County alum Lizzie Rovsek.

Angus appeared on the ITV daytime magazine programme This Morning on October 7, 2014, alongside her Ladies of London co-stars.

Angus appeared in the TLC television film Meghan & Harry: A Royal Baby Story in 2019.

Angus made a cameo appearance during the eighth episode in the first season of the Bravo reality television series The Real Housewives of Dubai. The episode, "Drama in the Sandbox", was broadcast on July 27, 2022.

Angus is an original main cast member on the Hayu reality television series The Real Housewives of London. The first season premiered on August 18, 2025, with Amanda Cronin, Karen Loderick-Peace, Juliet Mayhew, Panthea Parker, and Nessie Welschinger.

== Personal life ==
On July 21, 2007, she married Canadian businessman Gregor Angus. They have two children together, a daughter and a son. The family divide their time between their homes in Battersea, South London and Clapham, south west London.

By the time of airing of The Real Housewives of London she had moved back to Paddington, London.

Angus dated the comedian and actor Bob Saget in 1997. She paid tribute to Saget following his death in 2022.

== Filmography ==
Year	Title	Notes
2002	Beg, Borrow & Deal	1 episode
2003	Diva Detectives	1 episode
2014–2017	Ladies of London	Main cast (seasons 1–3)
2014	Watch What Happens Live with Andy Cohen	1 episode
2014	This Morning	1 episode
2016	E! News Daily	1 episode
2019	Meghan & Harry: A Royal Baby Story	Television film
2022	The Real Housewives of Dubai	1 episode
2025–present	The Real Housewives of London	Main cast
