= The Real Housewives of Dubai season 1 =

The Real Housewives of Dubai
- Season 1
- Starring: Nina Ali; Sara Al Madani; Chanel Ayan; Caroline Brooks; Lesa Milan; Caroline Stanbury
- No. of episodes: 14

Release
- Original network: Bravo
- Original release: June 1 – September 7, 2022

Season chronology
- Next → Season 2

The first season of The Real Housewives of Dubai, an American reality television series, was broadcast on Bravo. It premiered on June 1, 2022, and was primarily filmed in Dubai, United Arab Emirates. The season was produced by Steven Weinstock, Glenda Hersh, Lauren Eskelin, Jamie Jakimo, Brandon Panaligan, Glenda N. Cox, Chelsey Stephens, Giovanni Wilson and Andy Cohen.

Season 1 of The Real Housewives of Dubai focuses on the lives of Nina Ali, Sara Al Madani, Chanel Ayan, Caroline Brooks, Lesa Milan and Caroline Stanbury. It premiered on June 1, 2022.

== Production and crew ==
Steven Weinstock, Glenda Hersh, Lauren Eskelin, Jamie Jakimo, Brandon Panaligan, Glenda N. Cox, Chelsey Stephens, Giovanni Wilson and Andy Cohen are recognized as the season's executive producers; it is produced and distributed by Truly Original.

== Episodes ==
No. overall	No. in season	Title	Original release date	U.S. viewers (millions)
1	1	"Sand Dunes and Don'ts"	June 1, 2022	0.77
2	2	"The G.O.A.T"	June 8, 2022	0.66
3	3	"Lemons Into Lemonade"	June 15, 2022	0.64
4	4	"Desert Détente"	June 22, 2022	0.66
5	5	"Piping Tea With a Hint of Peach"	July 6, 2022	0.50
6	6	"Dinner on the Rocks"	July 13, 2022	0.58
7	7	"Meet the Carrallos"	July 20, 2022	0.53
8	8	"Drama in the Sandbox"	July 27, 2022	0.62
9	9	"Dancehall It Out"	August 3, 2022	0.64
10	10	"Girls Trippin'"	August 10, 2022	0.48
11	11	"Salty Waters"	August 17, 2022	0.50
12	12	"Du-bye Girl"	August 24, 2022	0.48
13	13	"Reunion Part 1"	August 31, 2022	0.55
14	14	"Reunion Part 2"	September 7, 2022	0.66
