= The Real Housewives of Dubai season 2 =

The Real Housewives of Dubai
- Season 2
- Starring: Sara Al Madani; Chanel Ayan; Caroline Brooks; Lesa Milan; Caroline Stanbury; Taleen Marie
- No. of episodes: 15

Release
- Original network: Bravo
- Original release: June 2 – September 17, 2024

Season chronology
- ← Previous; Season 1

The second season of The Real Housewives of Dubai, an American reality television series, was broadcast on Bravo. It premiered on June 2, 2024, and was primarily filmed in Dubai, United Arab Emirates. The season was produced by Steven Weinstock, Glenda Hersh, Lauren Eskelin, Jamie Jakimo, Brandon Panaligan, Glenda N. Cox, Chelsey Stephens, Giovanni Wilson and Andy Cohen.

Season 2 of The Real Housewives of Dubai focuses on the lives of Sara Al Madani, Chanel Ayan, Caroline Brooks, Lesa Milan, Caroline Stanbury and Taleen Marie.

== Production and crew ==
Steven Weinstock, Glenda Hersh, Lauren Eskelin, Jamie Jakimo, Brandon Panaligan, Glenda N. Cox, Chelsey Stephens, Giovanni Wilson and Andy Cohen are recognized as the season's executive producers; it is produced and distributed by Truly Original.

== Episodes ==
No. overall	No. in season	Title	Original release date	U.S. viewers (millions)
15	1	"The V.V.I.P."	June 2, 2024 (Note: Premiered November 3, 2023 at BravoCon)	0.40
16	2	"Friendship on the Rocks"	June 11, 2024	0.33
17	3	"Don't Cross the Caro-line"	June 18, 2024	0.31
18	4	"Drama Queens"	June 25, 2024	0.32
19	5	"A New Home and Game of Telephone"	July 2, 2024	0.25
20	6	"Deserted Friendships"	July 9, 2024	0.28
21	7	"The Beauty and the Beggar"	July 16, 2024	0.31
22	8	"The Sisterhood of the Traveling Voice Note"	July 23, 2024	0.31
23	9	"Note to Be Trusted"	August 6, 2024	0.31
24	10	"Dressed to the Whines"	August 13, 2024	0.36
25	11	"Hold Your Horses"	August 20, 2024	0.24
26	12	"Serving the Tee"	August 27, 2024	0.25
27	13	"Best Friends for Never"	September 3, 2024	0.28
28	14	"Reunion Part 1"	September 10, 2024	0.19
29	15	"Reunion Part 2"	September 17, 2024	0.24
