= List of The Real Housewives of Dubai episodes =

The Real Housewives of Dubai is an American reality television series that premiered June 1, 2022 on Bravo. The series chronicles the lives of seven women in and around Dubai over the course of two seasons as they balance their personal and business lives, along with their social circle.

Cast members featured over the series' two season-run were: Sara Al Madani (1–2), Nina Ali (1), Chanel Ayan (1–2), Caroline Brooks (1–2), Lesa Milan (1–2), Caroline Stanbury (1–2) and Taleen Marie (2).

As of September 17, 2024, 29 original episodes of The Real Housewives of Dubai have aired over two seasons.

== Series overview ==
The Real Housewives of Dubai episodes
Season	Episodes	Originally released		Average Viewers
Season	Episodes	First released	Last released	Average Viewers
1	14	June 1, 2022	September 7, 2022	0.59
2	15	June 2, 2024	September 17, 2024	0.29

== Episodes ==
=== Season 1 (2022) ===
Sara Al Madani, Nina Ali, Chanel Ayan, Caroline Brooks, Lesa Milan, and Caroline Stanbury are introduced as series regulars.

No. overall	No. in season	Title	Original release date	U.S. viewers (millions)
1	1	"Sand Dunes and Don'ts"	June 1, 2022	0.77
2	2	"The G.O.A.T"	June 8, 2022	0.66
3	3	"Lemons Into Lemonade"	June 15, 2022	0.64
4	4	"Desert Détente"	June 22, 2022	0.66
5	5	"Piping Tea With a Hint of Peach"	July 6, 2022	0.50
6	6	"Dinner on the Rocks"	July 13, 2022	0.58
7	7	"Meet the Carrallos"	July 20, 2022	0.53
8	8	"Drama in the Sandbox"	July 27, 2022	0.62
9	9	"Dancehall It Out"	August 3, 2022	0.64
10	10	"Girls Trippin'"	August 10, 2022	0.48
11	11	"Salty Waters"	August 17, 2022	0.50
12	12	"Du-bye Girl"	August 24, 2022	0.48
13	13	"Reunion Part 1"	August 31, 2022	0.55
14	14	"Reunion Part 2"	September 7, 2022	0.66

=== Season 2 (2024) ===
Nina Ali departed as a series regular. Taleen Marie joined the cast. Saba Yussouf served in a recurring capacity.

No. overall	No. in season	Title	Original release date	U.S. viewers (millions)
15	1	"The V.V.I.P."	June 2, 2024 (Note: Premiered November 3, 2023 at BravoCon)	0.40
16	2	"Friendship on the Rocks"	June 11, 2024	0.33
17	3	"Don't Cross the Caro-line"	June 18, 2024	0.31
18	4	"Drama Queens"	June 25, 2024	0.32
19	5	"A New Home and Game of Telephone"	July 2, 2024	0.25
20	6	"Deserted Friendships"	July 9, 2024	0.28
21	7	"The Beauty and the Beggar"	July 16, 2024	0.31
22	8	"The Sisterhood of the Traveling Voice Note"	July 23, 2024	0.31
23	9	"Note to Be Trusted"	August 6, 2024	0.31
24	10	"Dressed to the Whines"	August 13, 2024	0.36
25	11	"Hold Your Horses"	August 20, 2024	0.24
26	12	"Serving the Tee"	August 27, 2024	0.25
27	13	"Best Friends for Never"	September 3, 2024	0.28
28	14	"Reunion Part 1"	September 10, 2024	0.19
29	15	"Reunion Part 2"	September 17, 2024	0.24
