= Noelle Reno =

American socialite (born 1983)

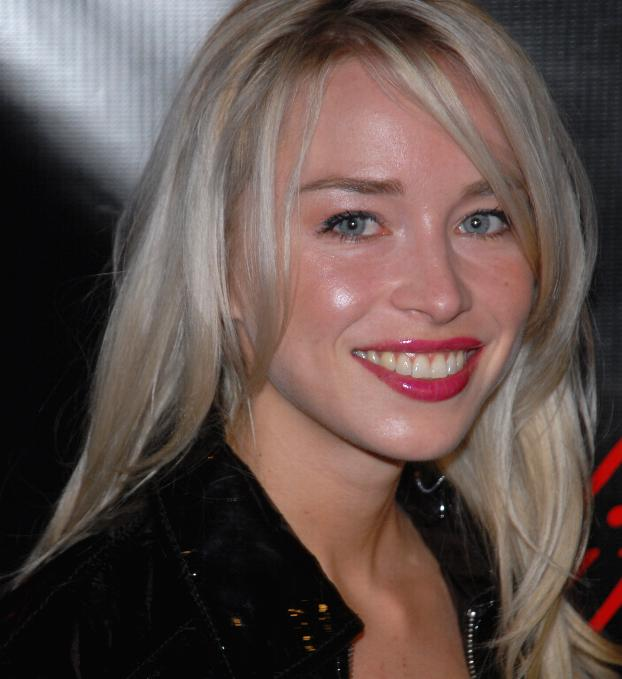
- Reno in 2008
- Born: Elizabeth Noelle Reno; December 25, 1983 (age 42); Phoenix, Arizona, U.S.
- Occupations: Entrepreneur, investor, socialite, media personality
- Years active: 2014–present
- Television: Ladies of London (2014)
- Partners: Matthew Mellon (2004–2008; engaged); Scot Young (2009–2014; engaged 2013); Nick Perks (2016–2017)
- Children: 1

Elizabeth Noelle Reno (born December 25, 1983), known professionally as Noelle Reno, is an entrepreneur focused on private capital and frontier technology. She is the founder of the Frontier Family Office Forum, a private capital platform convening family offices, policymakers and technology leaders. She is also known as a socialite and an original main cast member on the Bravo reality television series Ladies of London (2014).

Reno is currently based in London, England.

== Early life ==
Elizabeth Noelle Reno was born in Phoenix, Arizona on Christmas Day 1983, as the daughter to Don Reno, a Special Assistant US Attorney, and his wife, Carole Ann Reno. She was raised in Mercer Island, a suburb of Seattle, Washington.

== Career ==
Reno began her career as a model for Elite Model Management. She moved to Los Angeles in 2000 after being cast by film director Michael Bay in his Super Bowl television commercial for Mercedes-Benz S-Class . In 2004, she began dating Matthew Mellon, banking heir and businessman. Mellon invested in Reno's first start up, a leisure clothing company called Degrees of Freedom. Reno sold her shares in Degrees of Freedom in 2008. In 2008, Reno partnered with Dame Zandra Rhodes and retailer Harvey Nichols on a retail concept and became a presenter for Fashion TV. Reno went on to present, blog, and appear in mainstream media on Channel 5 (UK), BBC Four, and Huffington Post.

Reno rose to prominence as an original main cast member on the Bravo reality television series Ladies of London. The first season premiered on June 2, 2014, with Juliet Angus, Caprice Bourret, Marissa Hermer, Annabelle Neilson, and Caroline Stanbury. She quit the show following Young's death.

== Personal life ==
Reno first came to the attention of the press in 2004, as a result of her relationship with Matthew Mellon, a businessman, from the Mellon family. Mellon was 19 years her senior. She has spoken publicly about how Mellon's drug addiction affected her throughout their relationship. They moved to London. The couple separated in 2008, subsequently calling off their engagement. Following their split, she became close friends with the British fashion entrepreneur Tamara Mellon, the ex-wife of her former fiancée. Mellon died from a heart attack at a rehabilitation centre in Cancun, Mexico on April 16, 2018, aged 54.

Reno started dating Scot Young, a Scottish property developer, in 2009. They got engaged in 2013. Young was 21 years her senior. The couple called off their engagement two weeks prior to Young's death. On December 8, 2014, Young, aged 52, died after falling from a fourth-floor flat and being impaled on railings at 33 Montagu Square in Marylebone. Before his death, Young phoned Reno, and told her: "I'm going to jump out of the window. Stay on the phone; you will hear me." The inquest into Young's death found there was insufficient evidence to declare his death a suicide as there were no suspicious circumstances around the death. In a piece for The Times in July 2018, Reno wrote of her beliefs that Young was driven to suicide by the Russian mob.

In July 2016, Reno announced that she was pregnant with her first child, a boy, with her then-partner, Nick Perks, a London banker. She found out she was pregnant four months into their relationship. On November 10, 2016, at the Ronald Reagan UCLA Medical Center in Los Angeles, she gave birth to her son, who she called Xander Maximilian Perks. The couple split in 2017.

== Filmography ==
=== As an actress ===
Year	Title	Role	Notes
2005	Devour	Kelly	
2005	Ice Queen	Tori	
2006	Saint Francis	Pulsetta	

=== As herself ===
Year	Title	Notes
2014	Ladies of London	Series regular; 9 episodes
2014	This Morning	1 episode
