= The Real Housewives of London =

British reality television series

- Genre: Reality
- Based on: The Real Housewives
- Presented by: Katherine Ryan
- Starring: Juliet Angus; Amanda Cronin; Karen Loderick-Peace; Juliet Mayhew; Panthea Parker; Nessie Welschinger
- Country of origin: United Kingdom
- Original language: English
- No. of seasons: 2
- No. of episodes: 23

Production
- Camera setup: Multiple
- Running time: 43–50 minutes
- Production company: Universal Television Alternative Studio UK

Original release
- Network: Hayu
- Release: 18 August 2025 – present

Related
- The Real Housewives of Cheshire; The Real Housewives of Jersey

The Real Housewives of London, abbreviated RHOLDN, is a British reality television show that premiered on Hayu on 18 August 2025. The series focuses on the personal and professional lives of six glamorous, stylish and bold women living in London, England.

Developed as Hayu's first original series, it is the third installment in The Real Housewives franchise to be produced in the United Kingdom, following The Real Housewives of Cheshire and The Real Housewives of Jersey. The first series consisted of cast members Juliet Angus, Amanda Cronin, Karen Loderick-Peace, Juliet Mayhew, Panthea Parker, and Nessie Welschinger.

== Overview ==
On 26 October 2024, Andy Cohen announced The Real Housewives of London at the first-ever Hayu FanFest in London. The series, produced by Universal Television Alternative Studio UK, marks Hayu's first-ever commission of an original series, and premiered exclusively on the streaming service in 2025. On 15 May 2025, Hayu hinted at the casting announcement with a new teaser. On 29 May 2025, Hayu announced the full cast of six women: Juliet Angus, Amanda Cronin, Karen Loderick-Peace, Juliet Mayhew, Panthea Parker, and Nessie Welschinger. Angus previously starred on the Bravo reality television series Ladies of London, while Loderick-Peace previously was a cast member of The Real Housewives of Jersey and Cheshire. Caroline Stanbury of The Real Housewives of Dubai and Dorinda Medley of The Real Housewives of New York City make guest appearances during the season. Following the release of each episode, Hayu also streams The Real Housewives of London After Show, featuring cast interviews and behind-the-scenes content. On 19 June 2025, comedian Katherine Ryan was announced as the reunion host.

In February 2026, it was announced that it had been renewed for a second series, with all cast members set to return. The second series premiered on 7 September 2026, with episodes releasing weekly. Ryan is set to return as host of the series two reunion.

== Cast ==
Timeline of the cast
Cast member	Series	
Cast member	1	2
Juliet Angus	Main	Main
Amanda Cronin	Main	Main
Karen Loderick-Peace	Main	Main
Juliet Mayhew	Main	Main
Panthea Parker	Main	Main
Nessie Welschinger	Main	Main

== Episodes ==
Series	Episodes	Originally released	
Series	Episodes	First released	Last released
1	12	18 August 2025	3 November 2025
2	TBA	7 September 2026	TBA

=== Series 1 (2025) ===
The Real Housewives of London series 1 episodes
No. overall	No. in series	Title	Rating (18–49)	Original release date	US viewers (millions)
1	1	"Welcome to London, Hope You Brought Armour"	TBA	18 August 2025	0.21
2	2	"Betrayals and Body Tapping"	TBA	25 August 2025	0.17
3	3	"Baggage Claim"	TBA	1 September 2025	N/A
4	4	"Fifty Shades of Red"	TBA	8 September 2025	N/A
5	5	"Alcohol & Ozempic"	TBA	15 September 2025	N/A
6	6	"White Witches and Warm Champange"	TBA	22 September 2025	N/A
7	7	"Highland Fling"	TBA	29 September 2025	N/A
8	8	"Loch Mess"	TBA	6 October 2025	N/A
9	9	"Chelsea in Bloom, Friendships in Ruin"	TBA	13 October 2025	N/A
10	10	"Garden of Grudges, Glimmer of Hope?"	TBA	20 October 2025	N/A
11	11	"Reunion Part 1"	TBA	27 October 2025	N/A
12	12	"Reunion Part 2"	TBA	3 November 2025	N/A

=== Series 2 (2026) ===
The Real Housewives of London series 2 episodes
No. overall	No. in series	Title	Original release date
13	1	"Carbone Footprint"	7 September 2026
14	2	"Love, Lies and Lunar New Year"	14 September 2026
15	3	"Stiff Upper Lips"	21 September 2026
16	4	"Check Your Baggage"	28 September 2026
17	5	"Switzerland Breaks Neutrality"	5 October 2026
18	6	"Loose Lips Sink Yachts"	12 October 2026
19	7	"The C-Word and the Sea"	19 October 2026
20	8	"Read Them and Weep"	26 October 2026
21	9	"Soiree It Ain't So"	2 November 2026
22	10	"Luncheon Impossible"	9 November 2026
23	11	"Reunion – Part One"	16 November 2026

== International broadcast ==
In France, the programme premiered on E! (now Bravo France) and Universal+ on 5 October 2025. In Africa, the series premiered on Bravo Africa on 12 October 2025. In Australia, the series premiered on 7Bravo on 8 April 2026. It premiered in the United States on Bravo, on 21 July 2026.
