= Myka Meier =

American-British etiquette coach

- Born: June 27, 1982 (age 44); Sarasota, Florida, U.S.
- Education: University of Florida; Institut Villa Pierrefeu
- Occupations: etiquette coach, businesswoman, writer
- Spouse: Marco Meier
- Children: 2

Myka Meier (born 27 June 1982) is an American-British entrepreneur, etiquette coach, and author. She is the founder of Beaumont Etiquette and co-founder of the Plaza Hotel's Finishing Program. Meier has authored two books, Modern Etiquette Made Easy: A Five-Step Method to Mastering Etiquette and Business Etiquette Made Easy: The Essential Guide to Professional Success. In 2026, she joined the cast of British reality television series Ladies of London.

== Early life and education ==
Meier was born on 27 June 1982 in Sarasota, Florida. She grew up in a middle class family. She has a bachelor's degree from the University of Florida. She began taking etiquette courses after working abroad in communications. She mentored under a former member of the royal household of Elizabeth II. She went on to train in Continental European, British, and American etiquette at the Institut Villa Pierrefeu, a finishing school in Glion, Switzerland.

== Career ==
In 2014, Meier founded Beaumont Etiquette, a consultancy firm based in New York. She is the co-founder of the Plaza Hotel's Finishing Program, which is held at the hotel. She teaches The Duchess Effect, an etiquette class inspired by the manners of Catherine, Duchess of Cambridge and Meghan, Duchess of Sussex. Her classes involve dining etiquette, hostessing, business etiquette, and royal protocol.

In 2020, Meier's first book Modern Etiquette Made Easy: A Five-Step Method to Mastering Etiquette sold out worldwide twenty-four hours after being released on January 21, 2020. Her second book, Business Etiquette Made Easy: The Essential Guide to Professional Success, is set to be released on May 5, 2020. She was named an official partner of Downton Abbey: The Exhibition in America.

She has been called "America's Queen of Good Manners" and "America's First Lady of Manners" by The Times, and "The Marie-Kondo of Etiquette" by The Evening Standard. She has been featured in Vogue, Town & Country, Harper's Bazaar, Elle Decor, InStyle, People, Fast Company, and Brides. She has also made appearances on Good Morning America and The Today Show.

Myka coined the royal etiquette term "The Duchess Slant", now an internationally recognized term for how a royal sits.

In 2026, Myka joined the cast of the reality television series Ladies of London: The New Reign, which premiered on Bravo on March 5, 2026.

== Personal life ==
Meier is a dual citizen of the United States and the United Kingdom. Her husband, Marco Meier, is Swiss businessman. They have one daughter, Valentina, and one son, Maximillan, and live in New York City. She is the godmother of Christopher Woolf Mapelli Mozzi, the son of Dara Huang and Count Edoardo Mapelli Mozzi and stepson of Princess Beatrice of York.
