= Sara Jane Ho =

Chinese businesswoman and etiquette coach

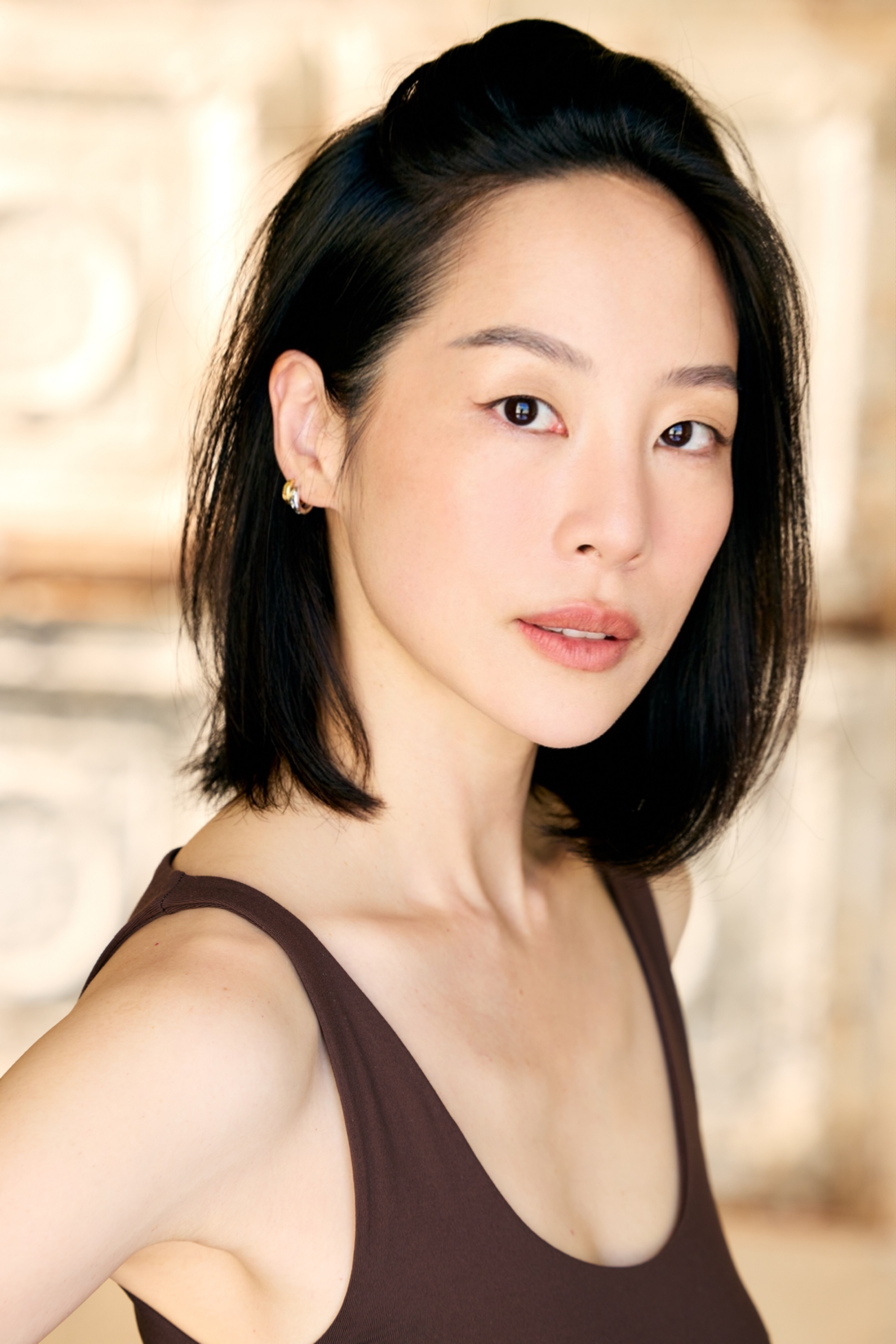
- Born: December 5, 1985 (age 40); Hong Kong
- Education: Georgetown University (BA); Harvard Business School (MBA)
- Occupation: Businesswoman

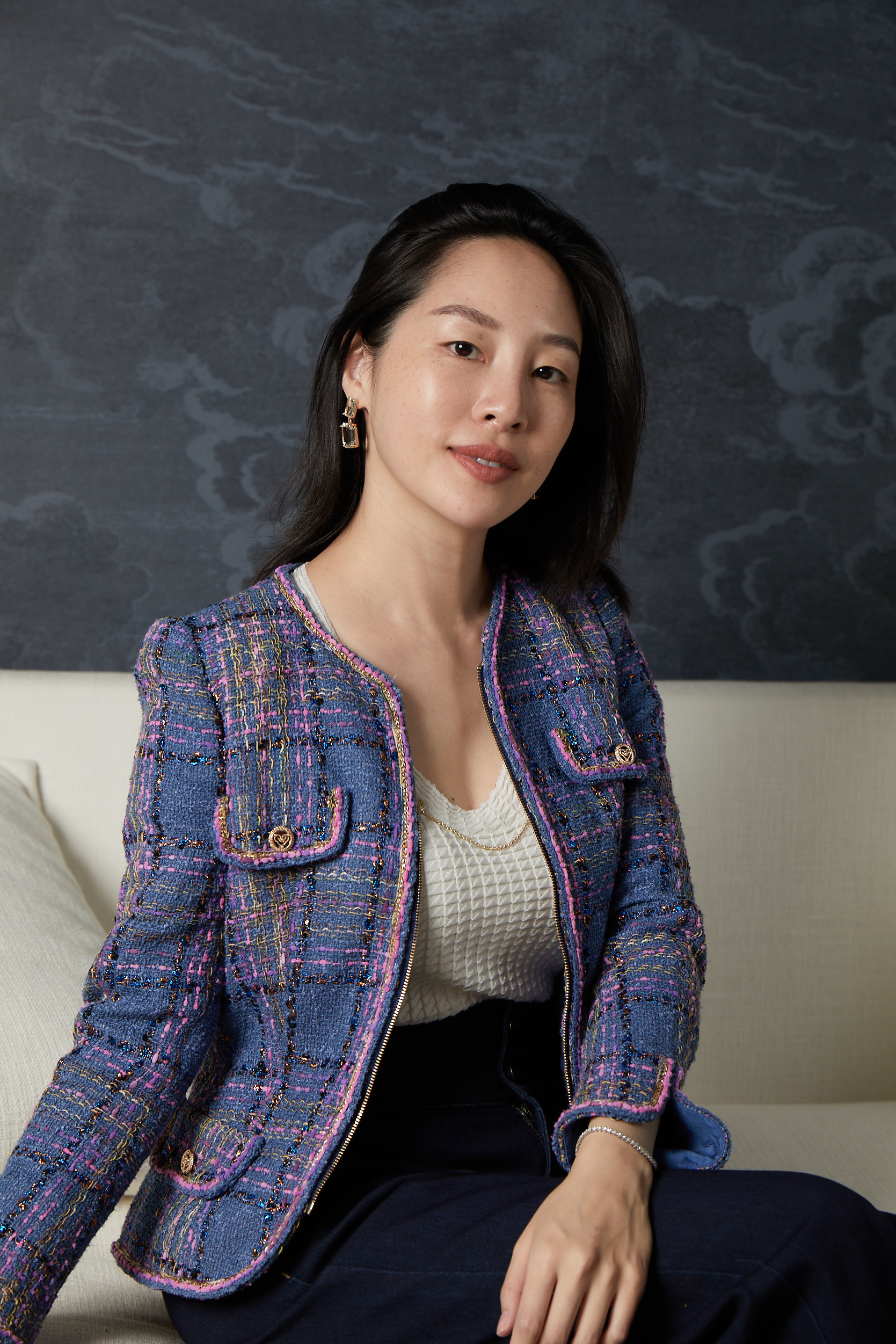
Sara Jane Ho in 2020

Sara Jane Ho (Chinese: 何佩蓉; pinyin: Hé Pèiróng) is a Chinese businesswoman, author, and socialite. She is the founder of Institute Sarita, a Beijing finishing school established in 2013 (closed since 2024). She is the etiquette expert and host for the 2022 Netflix series Mind Your Manners. The New York Times has described her as a representation of the new "Superrich" in China.

== Early life and education ==
Sara Jane Ho was born in Hong Kong in December 1985. Her father worked in oil exploration, while her mother was a music industry executive. Ho's mother died in 2007 when Sara Jane was 21. Ho credits her mother for her interest in etiquette through early exposure to international business and cultural norms.

Ho attended the Peak School and German Swiss International School in Hong Kong, followed by Phillips Exeter Academy in New Hampshire in the United States.

At 16, she interned as a reporter at the South China Morning Post. At 17, she interned at Citigroup in Hong Kong and Zhongguancun in Beijing, as well as at multinational consulting firms. By the time she was 18, Ho had lived in Papua New Guinea, the United Kingdom, Hong Kong, and the United States.

Ho is fluent in English, Cantonese, and Mandarin. She attained native-level Mandarin proficiency after moving to mainland China. She also speaks German and French. She studied English literature at Georgetown University, where she sits on the Georgetown College Board of Advisors, and received a Master of Business Administration from Harvard Business School.

== Career ==
Sara Jane Ho started her career as a Mergers & Acquisitions Analyst at the New York investment bank Perella Weinberg Partners.

After graduating from Institut Villa Pierrefeu, a Swiss finishing school, Ho moved to Beijing in 2013 to establish Institute Sarita. This was her first high-end etiquette school, which she founded through capital input from her father. Her courses ranged in price from about $3,200 to $16,000. In May 2015, Ho opened a second school in Shanghai. Ho closed both schools in 2024 when she moved to Los Angeles.

In 2013, Ho was named to the Forbes 2013 list of "Future Women in the Mix in Asia: 12 to Watch", and in 2015, she was named to the Forbes 30 Under 30 and included in the BBC 100 Women. Institute Sarita was recognized as one of the "World's Most Innovative 50 Companies" by Fast Company magazine in 2014.

In 2023, Ho was nominated for a Daytime Emmy for her makeover reality show Mind Your Manners on Netflix. The show was filmed in Australia after COVID-19 restrictions prevented production in Shanghai. It follows Ho as she provides etiquette and personal development coaching to individuals seeking to improve their confidence, social skills, and self-presentation.

In 2024, Ho signed with talent agency UTA and relocated to Los Angeles to expand her career. That same year, she published her etiquette book Mind Your Manners.

In April 2025, she launched the weekly podcast Mind Your Manners. This was renamed Hot Water in April 2026. The podcast focuses on Chinese culture and wellness including traditional Chinese medicine and feng shui.

Also in 2024, Ho co-founded the intimate skincare brand Antevorta with Annie Ho, who is not related to Sara Jane Ho. Antevorta's products are formulated using traditional Chinese medicinal herbs. The brand won "Best Wash" in Oprah Daily Menopause O-Wards in 2025. Antevorta is sold on QVC, where Ho appears regularly to educate viewers on TCM principles and holistic care.

Ho is the resident etiquette expert on The Drew Barrymore Show and has given talks on topics such as cultural fluency, cross-cultural identity, and perspectives on traditional Chinese medicine and Eastern wellness practices.
