= Werner Z. Hirsch =

American economist

Werner Zvi Hirsch
- Born: Werner Hirsch; June 10, 1920; Linz am Rhein, Rhineland-Palatinate, Germany
- Died: July 10, 2009 (aged 89); Los Angeles, California, U.S.
- Education: Hebrew University of Jerusalem; University of California, Berkeley
- Occupation: Economist
- Employer: University of California, Los Angeles
- Spouse: Hilde Emma Zwiren

Werner Zvi Hirsch (June 10, 1920 – July 10, 2009) was a German-born American economist. Born in small-town Germany, Hirsch emigrated to Mandatory Palestine (later known as Israel) to escape the Nazis in the late 1930s, where he attended the Hebrew University of Jerusalem. He emigrated to the United States in 1946 and received a PhD in economics from the University of California, Berkeley in 1949. He was a professor of economics at the University of California, Los Angeles (UCLA) from 1963 to 1990. He was an expert on urban economics and higher education policy.

== Early life ==
Werner Hirsch was born on June 10, 1920, in Linz am Rhein, Germany. Due to the rise of antisemitic National Socialism in Germany, Hirsch and his family moved to Haifa, Mandatory Palestine (now known as Israel) in 1936. He took the middle name "Zvi" in Israel.

Hirsch attended the Hebrew University of Jerusalem. He emigrated to the United States in 1946 and earned a bachelor's degree from the University of California, Berkeley in 1947. He earned a PhD in economics from Berkeley in 1949.

== Career ==
Hirsch worked at Berkeley from 1949 to 1951. He was an economist at the Brookings Institution in 1952. He taught economics at the Washington University in St. Louis from 1953 to 1962.

Hirsch became a professor of economics at the University of California, Los Angeles in 1963. He served as the first director of the Institute of Government and Public Affairs at UCLA. He retired from UCLA in 1990. Meanwhile, he worked for the RAND Corporation, the Kerner Commission, the United States Congress Joint Economic Committee, the United States Department of Housing and Urban Development, the Internal Revenue Service, and the National Science Foundation. Meanwhile, with Luc E. Weber, Hirsch was the co-founder of the Glion Colloquium, a think tank on higher education which published many books about higher education policy.

Hirsch endowed the Werner Z. Hirsch Award in Representational Drawing in the Department of Art at UCLA.

== Personal life and death ==
Hirsch married Hilde Emma Zwiren, known as Esther, whom he met in Israel. They resided in Los Angeles, California, where he died of pancreatic cancer, aged 89, on July 10, 2009.

== Works ==
- Hirsch, Werner Z.; Marcus, Morton J.; Segelhorst, Elbert W. (1964). Spillover of Public Education: Costs and Benefits. Los Angeles, California: University of California Press. OCLC 1050397.
- Baisden, Richard N.; Hirsch, Werner Z. (1965). California's Future Economic Growth: Economic Prospects of the Nation's Largest State, Proposals for Offsetting the Effects of Declining Defense Expenditures. Berkeley, California: Diablo Press. OCLC 976849.
- Hirsch, Werner Z. (1967). Elements of Regional Accounts. Baltimore, Maryland: Johns Hopkins University Press. OCLC 175527.
- Hirsch, Werner Z. (1967). Inventing Education for the Future. San Francisco, California: Chandler Publishing Company. OCLC 177973.
- Hale, Samuel; Hirsch, Werner Z. (1969). Agenda for the Los Angeles Area in 1970. Los Angeles, California: University of California Press. OCLC 558637.
- Hirsch, Werner Z.; Sonenblum, Sidney (1970). Selecting Regional Information for Government Planning and Decision-Making. New York: Praeger Publishers. ISBN 9780275027131. OCLC 66565.
- Hirsch, Werner Z. (1970). The Economics of State and Local Government. New York: McGraw-Hill Education. ISBN 9780070290426. OCLC 80049.
- Hirsch, Werner Z. (1971). Fiscal Pressures on the Central City: The Impact of Commuters, Nonwhites, and Overlapping Governments. New York: Praeger Publishers. OCLC 212612.
- Hirsch, Werner Z. (1971). Los Angeles: Viability and Prospects for Metropolitan Leadership. New York: Praeger Publishers. OCLC 235888.
- Gay, Robert M.; Hirsch, Werner Z.; Marcus, Morton J. (1972). Program Budgeting for Primary and Secondary Public Education: Current Status and Prospects in Los Angeles. New York: Praeger Publishers. OCLC 579272.
- Hirsch, Werner Z.; Sonenblum, Sidney (1973). Governing Urban America in the 1970s. New York: Praeger Publishers. ISBN 9780275286743. OCLC 584108.
- Hirsch, Werner Z. (1973). Urban Economic Analysis. New York: McGraw-Hill Education. ISBN 9780070290440. OCLC 577969.
- Hirsch, Werner Z.; Sonenblum, Sidney; Teeples, Ronald K. (1974). Local Government Program Budgeting: Theory and Practice, with Special Reference to Los Angeles. New York: Praeger Publishers. ISBN 9780275288594. OCLC 1269553.
- Hirsch, Werner Z. (1977). Recent Experiences with National Planning in the United Kingdom: A Study. Washington, D.C.: U.S. Government Printing Office. OCLC 6058328.
- Hirsch, Werner Z. (1979). Law and Economics: An Introductory Analysis. New York: Academic Press. ISBN 9780123494801. OCLC 5289386.
- Hirsch, Werner Z.; Rufolo, Anthony M. (1990). Public finance and expenditure in a federal system. San Diego, California: Harcourt Brace Jovanovich. ISBN 9780155734821. OCLC 21406046.
- Hirsch, Werner Z. (1991). Privatizing Government Services: An Economic Analysis of Contracting Out By Local Governments. Los Angeles, California: University of California Press. ISBN 9780892151691. OCLC 24928133.
- Weber, Luc E.; Hirsch, Werner Z. (1999). Challenges Facing Higher Education at the Millennium. Phoenix, Arizona: Oryx Press. ISBN 9781573562935. OCLC 41108558.
- Weber, Luc E.; Hirsch, Werner Z. (2001). Governance in Higher Education: The University in a State of Flux. London, U.K.: Economica. ISBN 9782717841909. OCLC 49707687.
- Hirsch, Werner Z.; Weber, Luc E. (2002). As the Walls of Academia Are Tumbling Down. London, U.K.: Economica. ISBN 9782717844399. OCLC 51821859.
