= Montagu Square =

Square in central London

Coordinates: 51°31′5″N 0°9′33″W

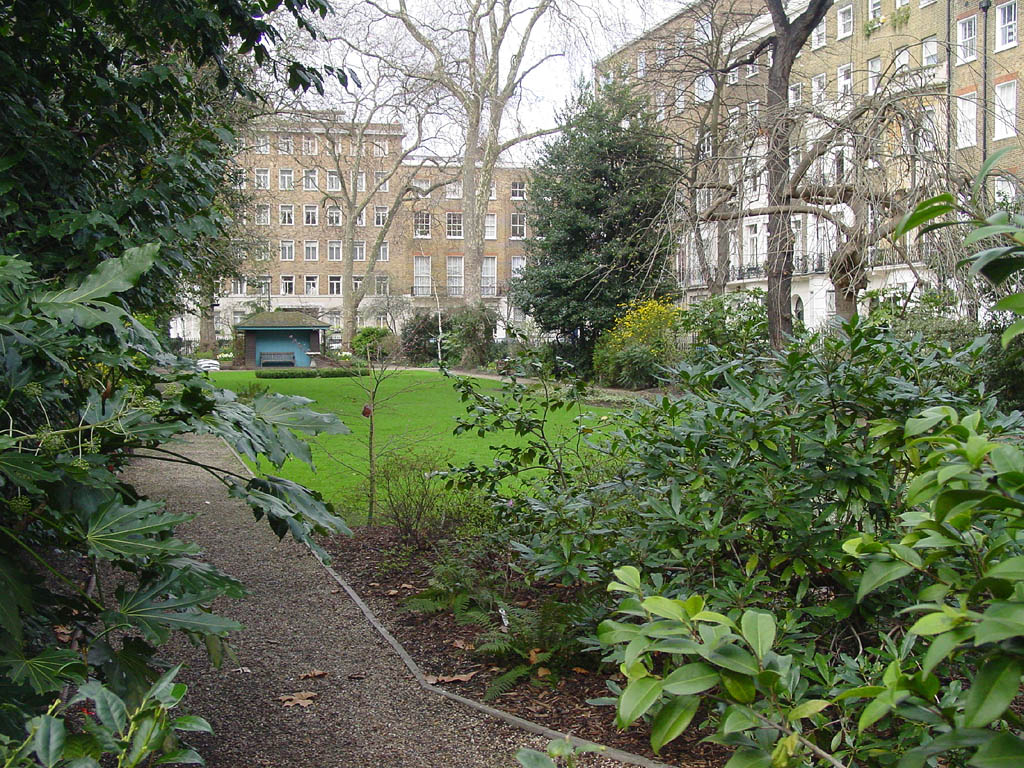
Montagu Square

Montagu Square is a garden square in Marylebone, London. It is centred 550 metres north of Marble Arch. It spans 810 feet (250 m) by 150 feet (46 m). and is oriented on an axis of about NNW. Save for No.s 27 to 29 the long sides (NNW-SSE) are Grade II listed residential buildings.

Montagu Place runs along the north end; George Street along the south; both have a crossroads on the western side with Upper Montagu/Montagu Streets, each in turn one block away from retail/service premises fronted streets.

== Architecture ==
It remains, as to minor, overarching interests, part of the Portman Estate. It was built between 1810 and 1815 along with Bryanston Square, a little to the west, and first leased to the builder David Porter. He named the square after his former mistress when he was a chimney sweep, Mrs. Elizabeth Montagu. John Summerson discounts the square as "a plain, uniform regiment of brown brick houses", comparing it unfavourably with Bryanston Square. The architect of both was Joseph T. Parkinson. Lower floors above ground level tend to have very long windows, reflecting the height of ceilings of these subtly mid rise buildings with elegant red stone dressings. The ground floors tend to feature paintwork, stucco and stone dressings for a contrasting pale colour.

There are no letter-suffixed numbers, but 5 of the original 63 (the north-west corners) have merged; leaving the original 58 still standing largely unaltered, as listed buildings – they have statutory protection in the mainstream, starting class:

Grade II

- 1,2,3,4,5, 6, 7,8,9,10,11,12, 13, 14, 15, 16, 17, 18, 19, 20, 21, 22, 23, 24, 25, 26, 30, 33, 34, 35, 36, 37, 38, 39, 40, 41, 42, 43, 44, 45, 46, 47, 48, 49, 50, 51, 52, 53, 54, 55, 56, 57, 58, 59, 60, 61, 62, and 63

All are similar, that of 35 reads:

Terraced town house. c.1810–11, by J.T. Parkinson as part of his Montagu-Bryanston Square development for the Portman Estate. Stock brick with channelled stucco ground floor; concealed slate roof. 5 storeys and basement. 3 windows wide. Semicircular arched doorway to left with panelled door, fluted jambs and patterned fanlight. Recessed sashes, under flat gauged arches to upper floors. Plat band finishing off ground floor stuccowork. Crowning stucco cornice and blocking course. Continuous, cast iron geometric patterned balcony to 1st floor. Cast iron area railings with urn finials."

== Famous residents ==
- Anthony Trollope, prolific 19th century author famous for his series of Barchester novels based on a fictitious cathedral city – at No.39 from 1873.
- Robert "Romeo" Coates, an early 19th century eccentric – at No.28 in the last years of his life.
- Jews' College occupied No.11 from 1954 to the early 1980s.
- Ted Hughes when he was separated from Sylvia Plath – at No.13 in December 1962
- Henry Grissell, 19th century foundryman of prestigious and ornate ironworks.
- Lady Hester Lucy Stanhope, British socialite, adventurer and traveler.
- Ringo Starr bought the basement flat at No.34 in the late 1960s. Jimi Hendrix lived there for a time after Starr moved to Sunny Heights. After Hendrix's departure, John Lennon's mother-in-law Lillian Powell stayed there occasionally, while Lennon himself moved there with Yoko Ono, in the early months of their relationship.
- Noelle Reno, fashion model, shared the 4th floor penthouse at No.33 with wayward property financier Scot Young, who jumped to his death from there in December 2014.
- Gavin Rossdale, lead singer and rhythm guitarist of the rock band Bush.

== Trivia ==
Numbering runs 1 to 63 consecutively, anti-clockwise; traffic circulates clockwise (plus two-way at short ends). Montagu Court (similar age to Brymon Court) has merged No.s 27 to 29 at the north end of Montagu Square. Brymon Court has merged No.s 31, 32 with the first two even numbers of Upper Montagu Street.
