= The Real Housewives of Jersey =

British reality television series

- Genre: Reality
- Based on: The Real Housewives
- Presented by: Brian Dowling (s. 2)
- Starring: Ashley Cairney; Hedi Green; Tessa Hartmann; Mia Ledbury; Jane Rayner; Kate Taylor; Margaret Thompson; Sarha Courtnay; Karen Loderick-Peace
- Country of origin: Jersey
- Original language: English
- No. of series: 2
- No. of episodes: 21

Production
- Executive producers: David Granger; Mike Swindells
- Production location: Jersey
- Running time: 42–45 minutes
- Production company: Monkey Kingdom

Original release
- Network: ITVBe
- Release: 28 December 2020 – 7 March 2022

Related
- The Real Housewives of Cheshire; The Real Housewives of London

The Real Housewives of Jersey, abbreviated RHOJersey, is a British reality television series that premiered on ITVBe on 28 December 2020. Developed as the second British installment of The Real Housewives franchise, it aired for two seasons and focused on the personal and professional lives of several women living in Jersey.

The show's cast members were Ashley Cairney, Hedi Green, Jane Rayner, Kate Taylor, Margaret Thompson, Mia Ledbury, Tessa Hartman, Sarha Courtnay and Karen Loderick-Peace.

== Overview ==
ITVBe officially commissioned the series in August 2020 following the success of the British instalment of the Real Housewives franchise, The Real Housewives of Cheshire. Filming began that same month. The show focused on the lives of the residents of Jersey and showcased the lifestyle of those who live on the Channel Island. The series was made in partnership with Jersey-based production company SnappyHappy TV.

In total, the series has been streamed 2.26 million times on ITV's catch-up service ITV Hub.

On 29 April 2021, ITV confirmed that filming had begun for the second series. Green and Rayner did not return in a full-time capacity, but made guest appearances during the season. Sarha Courtnay and Karen Loderick-Peace joined the returning cast as new housewives, with Loderick-Peace joining in episode 1 and Courtnay in episode 2. The second series premiered on 27 December 2021 and was followed by a reunion show, which was recorded soon after filming for season 2 wrapped. Episodes aired weekly, however the entire series was made available on the ITV Hub upon premiere. On 27 February 2022, Tessa Hartmann departed the show after two seasons. On 5 May 2022, ITV announced that they had no plans to renew the series for a third season.

In May 2025, Loderick-Peace was announced as a cast-member of The Real Housewives of London.

== Cast ==
=== Timeline of cast members ===
Main cast members
Cast member	Series	
Cast member	1	2
Ashley Cairney	Main	Main
Hedi Green	Main	
Tessa Hartmann	Main	Main
Mia Ledbury	Main	Main
Jane Rayner	Main	
Kate Taylor	Main	Main
Margaret Thompson	Main	Main
Sarha Courtnay		Main
Karen Loderick-Peace		Main

== Episodes ==
Series	Episodes	Originally released	
Series	Episodes	First released	Last released
1	10	28 December 2020	1 March 2021
2	11	27 December 2021	7 March 2022

=== Series 1 (2020–21) ===
Ashley Cairney, Hedi Green, Tessa Hartman, Mia Ledbury, Jane Rayner, Kate Taylor, and Margaret Thompson are introduced as series regulars.

No. overall	No. in series	Title	Original release date	UK viewers (28 day figures)
1	1	"Welcome to Jersey"	28 December 2020	N/A
As summer begins on the beautiful island of Jersey, seven of the most glamorous residents prepare themselves for luxury estate agent Margaret Thompson's annual party.
2	2	"Forgive-Me-Nots"	4 January 2021	N/A
Whilst Kate celebrates her birthday, a text from a special someone brings a smile to her face, even if confusion surrounds her long-awaited introduction to Tessa. Mia's hopes for a return to modelling are boosted when Hedi offers some unexpected advice.
3	3	"Two Strikes & You're In"	11 January 2021	N/A
Kate's attempts to connect with Tessa continue to flounder, and Margaret steps in to help them find common ground. Ashley follows Sascha's advice and considers how to be more romantic, whilst Hedi starts to question why some ladies insist on lowering the tone.
4	4	"I Should Coco"	18 January 2021	N/A
Margaret hosts Coco Chanel Thompson's fourth birthday party, and the long-awaited meet-up between Kate and Tessa leaves their relationship in a sticky situation.
5	5	"Highcliffe, High Class"	25 January 2021	N/A
The housewives head off to a staycation, and Tessa's hopes for the weekend away are ambitious. Plus, tension lingers in the air following Jane's spat with Margaret.
6	6	"A Grave Concern"	1 February 2021	N/A
With the Staycation in full flow, the Housewives bond like never before, but a game of Truth or Dare threatens to derail some friendships, as a saucy revelation from the past pushes the ladies to their limits.
7	7	"Ladies Who Launch"	8 February 2021	N/A
Tessa's role as guest editor of a local magazine reaches its climax, with copies hitting the newsstands all over Jersey. However, as some people celebrate, others are left waiting for an invite to the party, including Janet.
8	8	"Fake Orgasm Addicts..."	15 February 2021	N/A
After Hedi's attempt to bring harmony to the Housewives ends up in chaos, Jane's hope to reunite the ladies with a night of fun, frolics and an inappropriate banana raises some eyebrows. Kate's ambition is to launch a charity 'Sea-athlon'.
9	9	"A Splash for Ash"	22 February 2021	N/A
As the fallout from Tessa and Mia's latest argument hangs over everyone, could a Housewives summit help to clear the air, or will it leave their friendship gasping for breath? Kate's world is turned upside down when a surprise guest arrives.
10	10	"La Finn"	1 March 2021	N/A
Whilst news of Jane's latest upset spreads among the Housewives, Kate's intention is to build bridges with Finn, but could too much love push him away? Mia hopes to revive her modelling career.

=== Series 2 (2021–22) ===
Green and Rayner departed as series regulars. Sarha Courtnay and Karen Loderick-Peace joined the cast.

No. overall	No. in series	Title	Original release date	UK viewers (28 day figures)
11	1	"New Friends and New Foes"	27 December 2021	N/A
The Jersey Housewives are back and have all been invited to the Summer Gala.
12	2	"The Birthday Bumps"	3 January 2022	N/A
Kate arranges a double dinner for her and Margret.
13	3	"Raising the Stakes"	10 January 2022	N/A
The housewives are left shellshocked after the dramatic end to the double birthday bash.
14	4	"Sass in the City"	17 January 2022	N/A
Mia has gathered the girls and they're all off to London in support of her modelling shoot, in the hope that getting away will bring everyone closer together again.
15	5	"Bite Me, I'll Bite Back"	24 January 2022	N/A
It's sunny in the City of London, and the Housewives are in search of fun! Kate takes Karen and Tessa roller-skating, whilst Mia takes everyone else to an immersive experience.
16	6	"Baby Steps and Battle Lines"	31 January 2022	N/A
Our housewives are back in gorgeous Jersey as Margaret and Kate arrange a baby shower for Ashley.
17	7	"Life's a Drag"	7 February 2022	N/A
Ashley has an awful run of bad luck.
18	8	"She Gets the Message"	14 February 2022	N/A
Karen arranges a party for Mia's birthday, and Margaret shares some shocking information about Karen.
19	9	"Runaway Bride"	21 February 2022	N/A
Tessa and Sascha renew their wedding vows, whilst Kate and Margaret, upset at not being invited, hold their own version, with Kate Taylor playing Tessa.
20	10	"The Great Divide"	28 February 2022	N/A
The housewives make peace after a series of non-stop drama.
21	11	"Reunion"	7 March 2022	N/A
For the first time in two series, the Housewives are brought together by Brian Dowling to attempt a resolution face-to-face.
