= German Swiss International School =

School in Hong Kong

Coordinates: 22°15′56″N 114°09′38″E

- Deutsch-Schweizerische Internationale Schule 德瑞國際學校
- Primary/Secondary: 11 Guildford Road, The Peak; Kindergarten/Lower Primary: 162 Pok Fu Lam Road, Pok Fu Lam; Business College: 162 Pok Fu Lam Road, Pok Fu Lam

Information
- Type: Private, International, Kindergarten, Primary, Secondary, Vocational, Co-Educational.
- Established: 1969
- Principal: Alexandra Freigang-Krause
- Enrollment: approx. 1300
- Years: Kindergarten, Klasse 1–12, Years 1–13, Wirtschaftskolleg
- Website: https://www.gsis.edu.hk
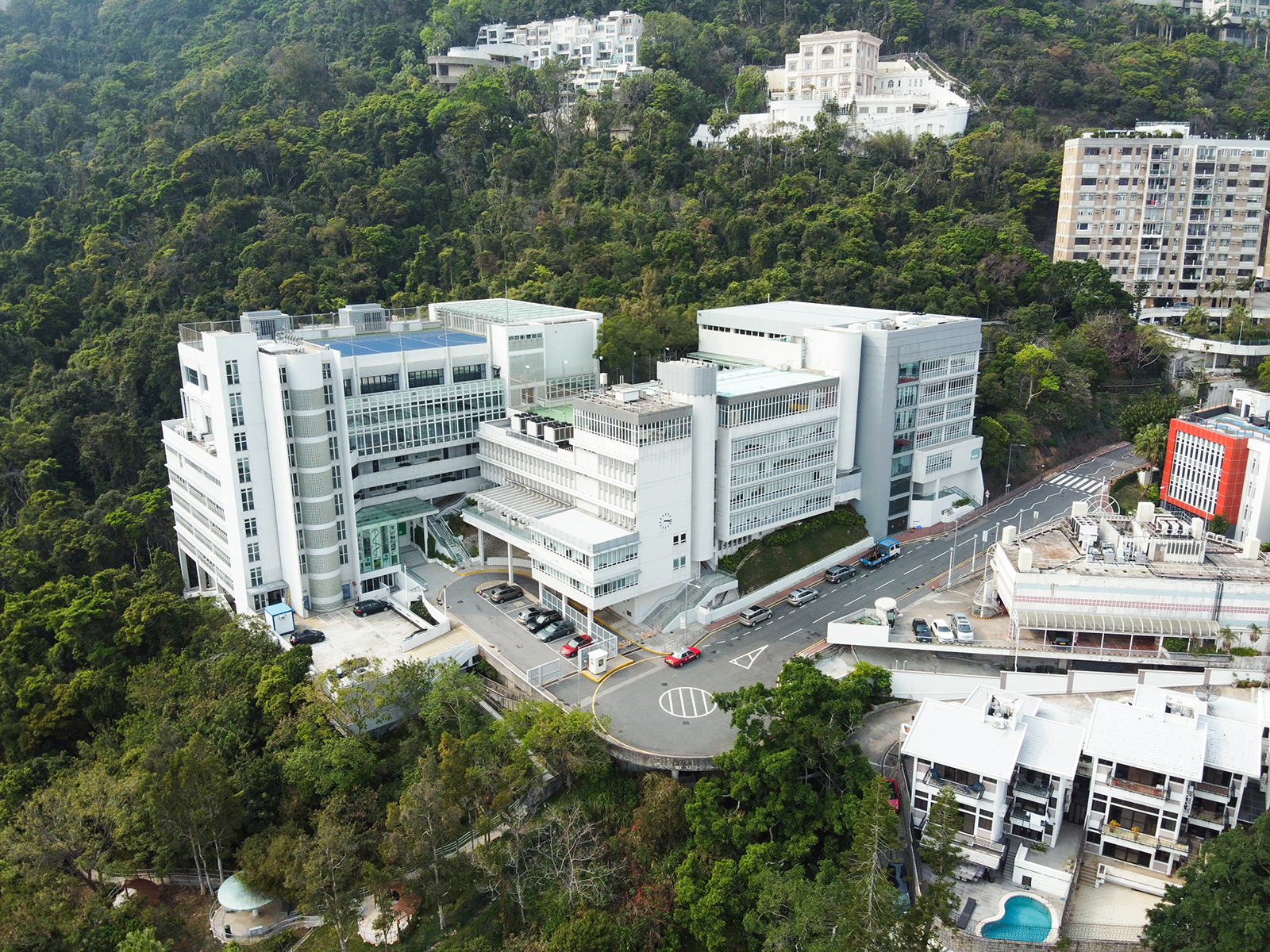
- Peak Campus on Guildford Road

German Swiss International School

Chinese name
- Traditional Chinese: 德瑞國際學校 / 德瑞國際學校
- Simplified Chinese: 德瑞国际学校 / 德瑞国际学校
Transcriptions
Standard Mandarin
- Hanyu Pinyin: Déguó Ruìshì Guójì Xuéxiào / Déshì Guójì Xuéxiào
Yue: Cantonese
- Yale Romanization: Dākgwok Seuihsih Gwokjai Hohkhaauh / Dāk Seuih Gwokjai Hohkhaauh
- Jyutping: dak1 gwok3 seoi6 si6 gwok3 zai3 hok6 haau6 / dak1 seoi6 gwok3 zai3 hok6 haau6

German name
- German: Deutsch-Schweizerische Internationale Schule

The German Swiss International School (GSIS; German: Deutsch-Schweizerische Internationale Schule; Chinese: 德瑞國際學校 / 德瑞國際學校) is an international school in Hong Kong established in 1969 by German and Swiss families looking for a bilingual German–English education in an international setting. Beginning with 73 students in its inaugural year, GSIS now has approximately 1,300 students from over 30 countries.

== History ==
The school was established in 1969 by German and Swiss parents led by Ingrid Buchholtz, with its first campus located at 1 Barker Road. This had followed two unsuccessful attempts at creating a German–Swiss school in 1967 and 1968. The German expatriate community in Hong Kong desired a German medium school but felt that alone it would not be able to support such an endeavour. A group in the Swiss community wishing to establish a German-medium school determined in 1964 that it alone could not sustain such a school. Impetus to create a German-language school snowballed in 1966 when a German community suggested collaborating with the Swiss. The 1967 Hong Kong riots interrupted the plans, which continued in 1968. To establish the school, $117,000 Hong Kong dollars were contributed by 25 companies from West Germany, while $78,000 Hong Kong dollars were contributed by 18 companies from Switzerland. The concept of a bilingual German–English curriculum was present from the start.

The kindergarten was located at Union Church on Kennedy Road, due to the long waiting list. The original school was on Barker Road; it was not owned by GSIS, and so the school rented the property. Its initial enrolment was 73, with German and Swiss students collectively being the majority.

In 1972 the Hong Kong Government provided the school with land on Guildford Road, free of charge, with construction of the current upper building beginning in 1973. Also in 1972, the West German government sent Hans Kraus to be appointed as the principal, as increasing enrolment forced the school to move some primary classes to May Road, followed by all non-kindergarten classes moving into the former hospital on Borrett Road in 1973. The Guildford campus had a cost of $7 million.

J. Tiemann became the GSIS headmaster in 1973. The West German government recognised the school in the early 1970s.

In 1975, the school's new Peak Campus at Guildford Road opened, with a total enrolment of 525. In 1975, because there was a perception that students were not mastering either English nor German, the school decided to set up separate Anglophone and German educational streams.

The United Kingdom educational-system English medium secondary school programme was scheduled to open in September 1975 with forms 1 through 4, with form 5 beginning the following year and with sixth form following afterward with all forms present in 1978.

The middle and lower buildings open in 1985 and 1993 respectively, with student numbers surpassing 1,000 in 1989.

Beginning in 1989, the government of Austria started sending one teacher on a regular basis.

In 2006, the kindergarten was moved to a temporary location in Tin Hau, whilst the Business College moved to Sai Ying Pun. By 2007, a permanent second campus location was found in Pok Fu Lam for the Business College, kindergarten and lower primary; in the same year, the school changed its curriculum from the A-level and Abitur system to the IB and DIAP respectively. A temporary location in Wan Chai was found for Y3–6 for five years starting in 2009, coinciding with the five-year Campus Development Plan, after which they were relocated back into the Peak Campus.

== Governance ==
The school is governed by a board of trustees. As of 1994, Swiss people make up a portion of the board.

Former headmasters:

- Joachim Tiemann – In 1983, as he was leaving his post, he received the West German Order of Merit

English is the school's sole language of governance, and English is the medium of communication between the Anglophone and German classes.

As of 1994 the governments of Germany, Austria, and Switzerland provide subsidies. The government of Germany also provides the headmaster, and ten other members of the teaching staff, and the Austrian government sends one teacher. The Education Department also gave help to GSIS in 1994.

== Curriculum ==
GSIS enrolls students from Kindergarten to Secondary in two parallel streams known as the English International Stream and the German International Stream. Starting from the 2019–2020 school year, it has also offered German–Chinese bilingual kindergarten classes. It also has a Business College (German Wirtschaftskolleg), which offers Wholesale & Foreign Trade and Transport & Logistics Management training programmes.

In 1997 the Anglophone classes had about 59% of the students, while the German classes had the other students. The main thrust of the GSIS curricula was that students have a bi-cultural Anglophone–German experience.

=== English International Stream ===
==== Primary department ====
The official Primary curriculum of the English Stream offers English/Language, Mathematics, Geography, General Studies, History, Library, Learning Technology, which is known as ICT to students, Music, Physical Education and Science. German language is taught from Year 2 and remains compulsory until after Year 11. Chinese (Mandarin) is introduced in Year 4 and Science is introduced in Year 7.

==== Secondary department ====
In 2013, the English Stream adopted the International Baccalaureate (IB) Diploma programme for Year 12 and 13, replacing the GCE A-level programme. Many students also take the SAT I/II or the Sprachdiplom for applications to universities in the United States or Germany respectively.

Before taking the IB, English International Stream students follow the British education system, completing GCSE and IGCSE examinations at the end of Year 11. The examining boards are Cambridge and Edexcel, depending on what subject is being taken.

At GCSE/IGCSE level, compulsory subjects include English Language, English Literature, German, Mathematics and Physical Education (not examined). Students also choose electives from the following subject pools:

- Languages (French and Mandarin)
- Humanities (Economics, History and Geography)
- Sciences (Physics, Chemistry, Biology and Computer Science)
- Arts (Art, Music, Drama)

International Advanced Subsidiary/A-levels are available for German and Chinese in Y11 for advanced students, so long as they take the IGCSE exam earlier in Y9. Advanced maths students may also elect to take the Further Pure maths course at IGCSE level. For the IB programme, students are only allowed a maximum of 6 subjects in total, with English and Mathematics being compulsory. Students are required to choose one subject each from the GCSE/IGCSE categories (with the addition of Anthropology as an option in Humanities). However, students are allowed to pursue a second Humanities or Science subject if they decide not to take a subject from the Arts.

=== German International Stream ===
In line with most German states, the German Secondary Department offers an eight-year Gymnasium course. The curriculum is based on the core curriculum of German schools in Southeast and East Asia, which in turn is based on the curricula of the state of Thuringia.

The school offers English, French, Latin and Mandarin programmes. GSIS is one of the first German Schools Abroad to offer the bilingual Deutsche Internationale Abiturprüfung (DIAP, German International Abitur Examination). As much as 50 per cent of the Abitur exams can be taken in English. To prepare students for these exams, Geography is taught bilingually from K07 to K09 and in English from K10; history is taught bilingually in all years from K08.

The Business College is based in the Pok Fu Lam Campus.

== Facilities ==
=== Campuses ===
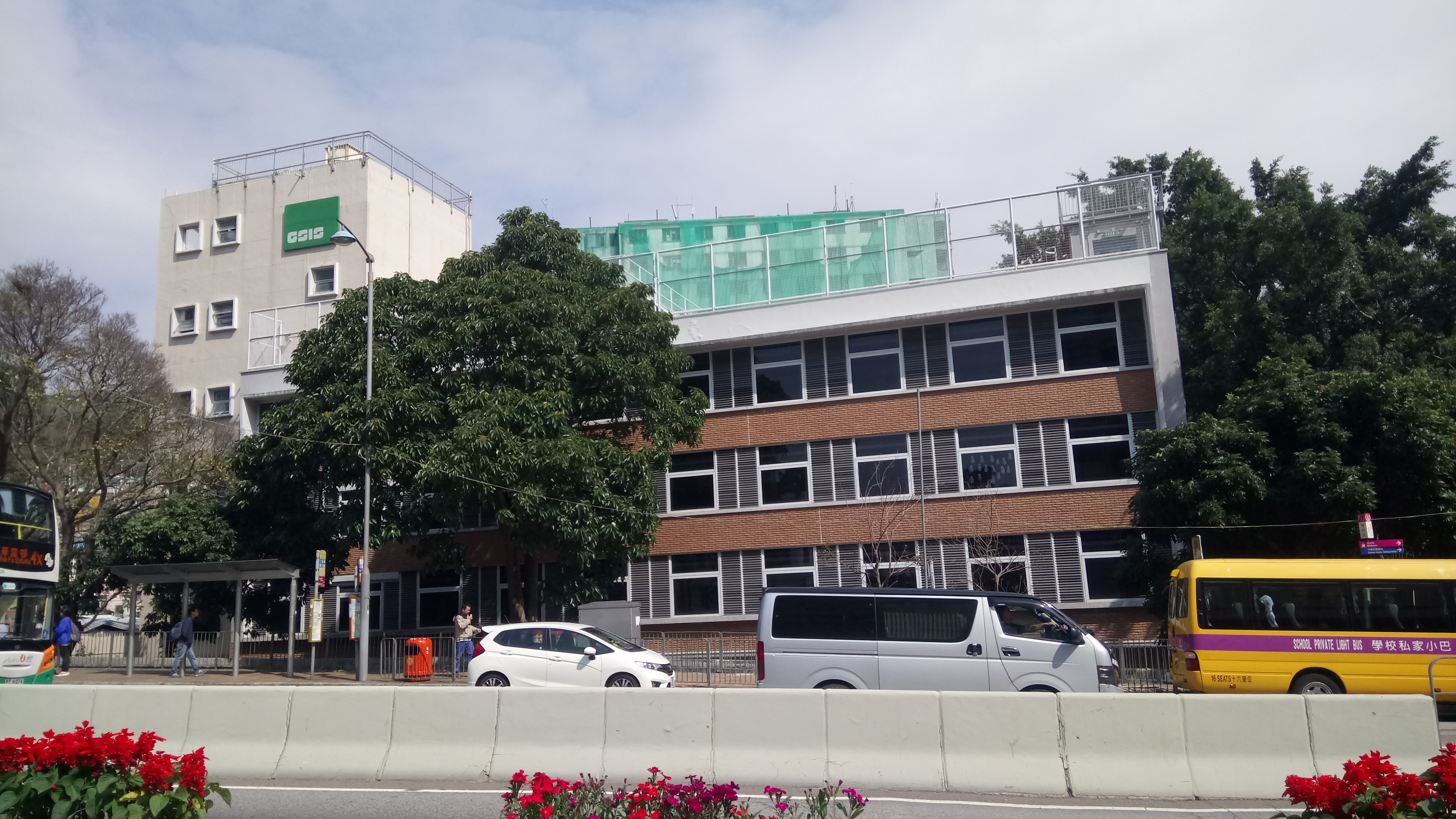
Pok Fu Lam Campus

In 1969, GSIS first opened to 73 students in a house at 1 Barker Road, The Peak. Due to growing student numbers, the school relocated some or all of its classes multiple times until 1975 when the school was able to open its first school building on Guildford Road. Today the Peak campus comprises three buildings, including the Upper Building, Middle Building and Lower Building. The Upper Building is taken up by the Primary School, while the Middle and Lower Buildings are for Secondary School. The cafeteria is operated by Compass, the catering company contracted by GSIS.

In 2007, the Hong Kong Government awarded GSIS a second campus at 162 Pok Fu Lam Road, Pok Fu Lam, which in 2010 became the new home for the Kindergarten and Lower Primary: Y01 in the English stream, and Deutsche Vorschule (German Preschool) in the German stream.

==== Campus Development Plan 2012–2016 ====
In 2008, the Board of GSIS developed a Campus Development Plan aimed at making better use of the space available for the current number of students and facilitate future curricular requirements. It was intended for the Upper Building to house the Primary Departments, while the Lower and Middle Buildings would house the Secondary Departments.

To minimise disturbance to classes over Phases III to V, GSIS secured a private campus in Wan Chai which temporarily housed both streams of the Upper Primary (K02-K04 in the German stream and Y03-Y06 in the English stream) from 2012 to 2016. This decanting site was originally owned and operated by the Wan Chai Kai Fong Welfare Association. The decanting site was originally proposed in Ma On Shan, until opposition came from parents.

Upon completion of Phase V, Y02-Y06 and K01-K04 moved into the Upper Building.

== Student body ==
In 1997 there were about 1,200 students from at least 30 countries.

=== Student Council ===
Every year, students elect the next year's head students and deputies. A pair of student is chosen from each stream, one boy and one girl, for a total of 4 head students.

=== Prefects ===
Teachers elect 12 Year 11 students and 6 Year 12 students to serve as the next year's prefects. Two head prefects are chosen to lead the team, often decided by the most votes or relations to the school.

== Debentures and fees ==
=== Debenture and Capital Levy ===
Once the student has been offered a spot at GSIS, a debenture has to be paid. The refundable debenture for the school term 2022/2023 is HKD$500,000. Alternatively one can opt for the Development Debenture (Non-Refundable) of HKD$432,250.

GSIS has launched a pilot Capital Levy scheme for an unspecified number of new students entering into selected classes and year groups for the 2021–2022 school year. Upon application, a parent or legal guardian of a candidate must select whether to select one of the above debentures or the capital levy if available to him. Under the scheme, HKD10,000 will become payable by 1 August and 1 February of that school year after the acceptance of an offer of a place. The number of Capital Levy applications, along with the selected classes and year groups, are under the discretion of school management and the board.

=== Fees ===
- Application fees (non-refundable): HK$2,350 per student (Kindergarten); HK$3,700 per student (Primary and Secondary)
- Assessment fee: HK$4,300 per student (non-refundable)

Tuition fees (annual)
Kindergarten	HK$168,600
Primary (German Preschool, K01–K05, Y01–Y06)	HK$174,400
Secondary (K06–K10, Y07–Y11)	HK$207,800
Secondary (K11–K12+, Y12–Y13)	HK$217,700

GSIS operates a financial aid program, where school fees are reduced for certain students on a case-by-case basis. There is, however, no ongoing scholarship program.

== Notable people ==
- Kat Alano, model, actress, presenter
- Stephen Fung, actor, singer, filmmaker
- Sara Jane Ho, socialite, businesswoman
- Alfred Hui, singer
- Adeline Rudolph, actress
- Bob's Your Uncle (YouTuber), YouTuber, influencer

== Controversial Acts ==
In December 2013, the South China Morning Post reported that GSIS, among at least four other international schools in Hong Kong, was significantly overcharging kindergarten application fees without the government's authorisation. While the limit imposed by the government was HK$30, the school was charging HK$3,700.

The Post reported that the school had been accused by a parent of mishandling incidents of sexual harassment in which her 15-year-old daughter had been the victim. The harasser, a 16-year-old boy, was arrested in October 2018 for indecent assault and released on bail. The mother stated that the school had discouraged her daughter from reporting the incidents to police (the school denied that this had occurred), and that the school had initially refused to discuss the matter with the boy until after his exams to avoid affecting his scores. She said that the school's response, which eventually comprised suspending the boy until the end of the school year (despite the term being close to ending) and organising a sexual consent programme for year 12 students, was "not acknowledging the seriousness of the incidents".

In June 2020 Mr Justice Jonathan Harris ruled it discriminatory to require all elected board directors to speak fluent German. The discriminatory regulations contravened the Race Discrimination Ordinance, the judge said, because GSIS was within the definition of a club, which was governed by the legislation. He observed that the German government, via its consulate, had attempted to intervene in the present case by having a parent who joined the proceedings in opposition relay the government's views to the court, but stressed its views bore no weight on the court's ruling.
