= Glion Colloquium =

Swiss-based think tank

The Glion Colloquium is a think-tank on higher education. It holds a forum every second year in Glion, Switzerland to consider the role of the world's leading higher education institutions in addressing emerging challenges and opportunities. For instance, one of its visions was the increase in the universities' role in the sustainability process.

== Overview ==
The Glion Colloquim was co-founded by Luc E. Weber and Werner Z. Hirsch. The first conference was held in Glion in May 1998. The Glion Declaration was written by Frank H. T. Rhodes in 1999. It questions the position of the university in a market-driven society. It also looks at the effects of globalization on research universities. Its second declaration in 2009 stated that "universities exist to liberate the unlimited creativity of the human species and to celebrate the unbounded resilience of the human spirit."

== Bibliography ==
- The Glion Declaration, Frank H. T. Rhodes (author) (1999)
- Governance in Higher Education: The University in a State of Flux, Luc E. Weber (author), Werner Z. Hirsch (editor), Werner Hirsch (author) (2001)
- As the Walls of Academia Are Tumbling Down, Luc E. Weber (ed.), Werner Zvi Hirsch (ed.) (2003)
- Reinventing the Research University, Luc E. Weber (ed.), James Johnson Duderstadt (ed.), 2004
- Universities and Business: Partnering for the Knowledge Society, Luc E. Weber (ed.), James Johnson Duderstadt (ed.), 2006
- The Globalization of Higher Education (Glion Colloquium), Luc E. Weber (ed.), James Johnson Duderstadt (ed.), 2008
- University Research for Innovation, Luc E. Weber (ed.), James Johnson Duderstadt (ed.), (2010)
