= Ladies of London =

American reality television series

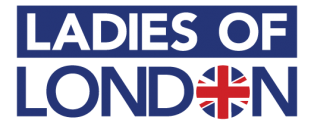
- Also known as: Ladies of London: The New Reign (season 4)
- Genre: Reality television
- Starring: Juliet Angus; Caprice Bourret; Marissa Hermer; Annabelle Neilson; Noelle Reno; Caroline Stanbury; Caroline Fleming; Julie Montagu; Sophie Stanbury; Missé Beqiri; Lottie Kane; Myka Meier; Kimi Murdoch; Martha Sitwell; Margo Stilley; Emma Thynn; Mark-Francis Vandelli
- Country of origin: United States
- Original language: English
- No. of seasons: 4
- No. of episodes: 39

Production
- Executive producers: Omid Kahangi; Jane Tranter; Travis Shakespeare; Ryan O’Dowd; Krystal Whitney; Craig Turner; Bill Fritz; Kathleen French
- Production locations: London, United Kingdom
- Camera setup: Multiple
- Production companies: Adjacent Productions; BBC Studios

Original release
- Network: Bravo
- Release: June 2, 2014 – February 7, 2017
- Release: March 5 – April 30, 2026

Ladies of London is an American reality television series broadcast on Bravo. It has aired four seasons, and chronicles the lives of several women who reside in London, United Kingdom, as they balance their social lives, businesses, and families.

Its first run consisted of three seasons, and premiered on June 2, 2014 and concluded on February 7, 2017. The first season starred Juliet Angus, Caprice Bourret, Marissa Hermer, Annabelle Neilson, Noelle Reno and Caroline Stanbury. Bourret and Reno departed after the first season, and Neilson left after the second. Julie Montagu and Caroline Fleming joined the cast in the second season, and Sophie Stanbury in the third.

The series was placed on hiatus after the third season for nine years, however, was rebooted and completely recast for a fourth season that premiered on March 5, 2026. The cast of the fourth season features Missé Beqiri; Lottie Kane; Myka Meier; Kimi Murdoch; Martha Sitwell, Lady Sitwell; Margo Stilley; Emma Thynn, Marchioness of Bath; and Mark-Francis Vandelli.

== Production ==
In March 2015, Bravo renewed Ladies of London for a second season, which premiered on September 7, 2015. In April 2016, the show was renewed for a third season, which premiered on November 29, 2016. Following the end of its third season, the show was placed on hiatus for nine years.

On July 12, 2018, Neilson, who was a muse for the late fashion designer Alexander McQueen, died at her home Chelsea, London.

Angus and Stanbury would later go on to star in The Real Housewives of London and The Real Housewives of Dubai, respectively.

On May 7, 2025, it was announced that the show would be revived by Bravo for a fourth season. Retitled Ladies of London: The New Reign, the revival premiered on March 5, 2026. The new cast consists of British socialites and American expats – including seven women: Missé Beqiri (formerly of The Real Housewives of Cheshire), Lottie Kane, Myka Meier, Kimi Murdoch, Lady Sitwell, Margo Stilley, the Marchioness of Bath; and a series first, one man as part of the main cast: Mark-Francis Vandelli (formerly of Made in Chelsea). Dara Huang had originally signed on to be a main cast member for season 4, but quit during the second episode before departing during the third, as a result, Stilley, who was originally signed on to be a "Friend of the Ladies" castmember on the show, was upgraded to a main cast member in Huang's place.

On June 24, 2026, it was announced the series was placed on hiatus for a second time.

== Cast ==
=== Timeline of cast members ===
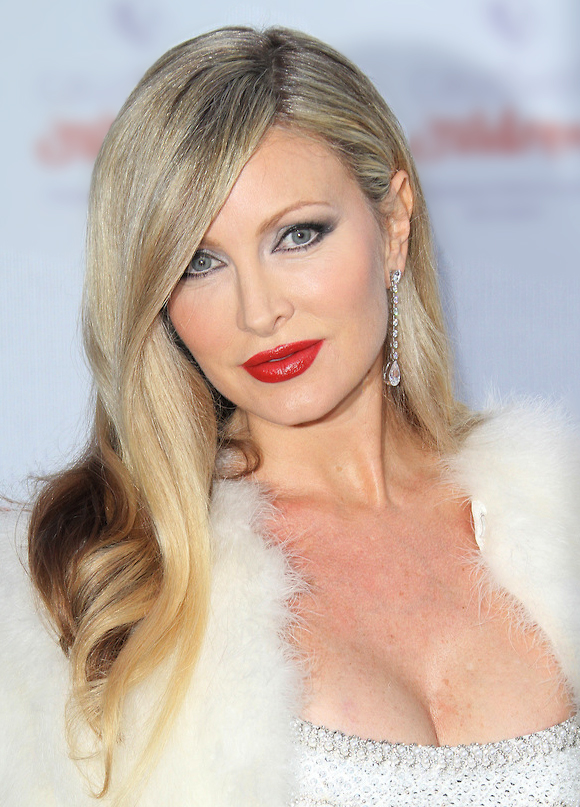
Caprice Bourret

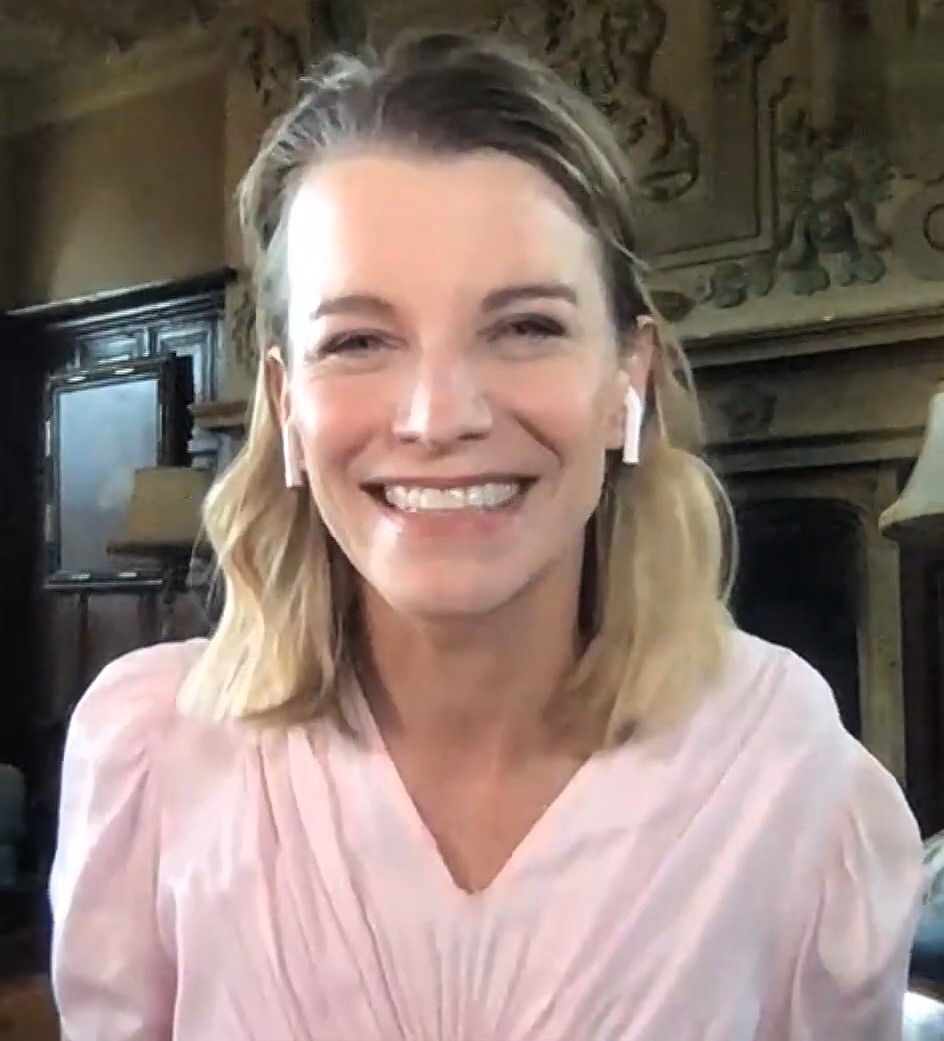
Julie Montagu, Viscountess Hinchingbrooke

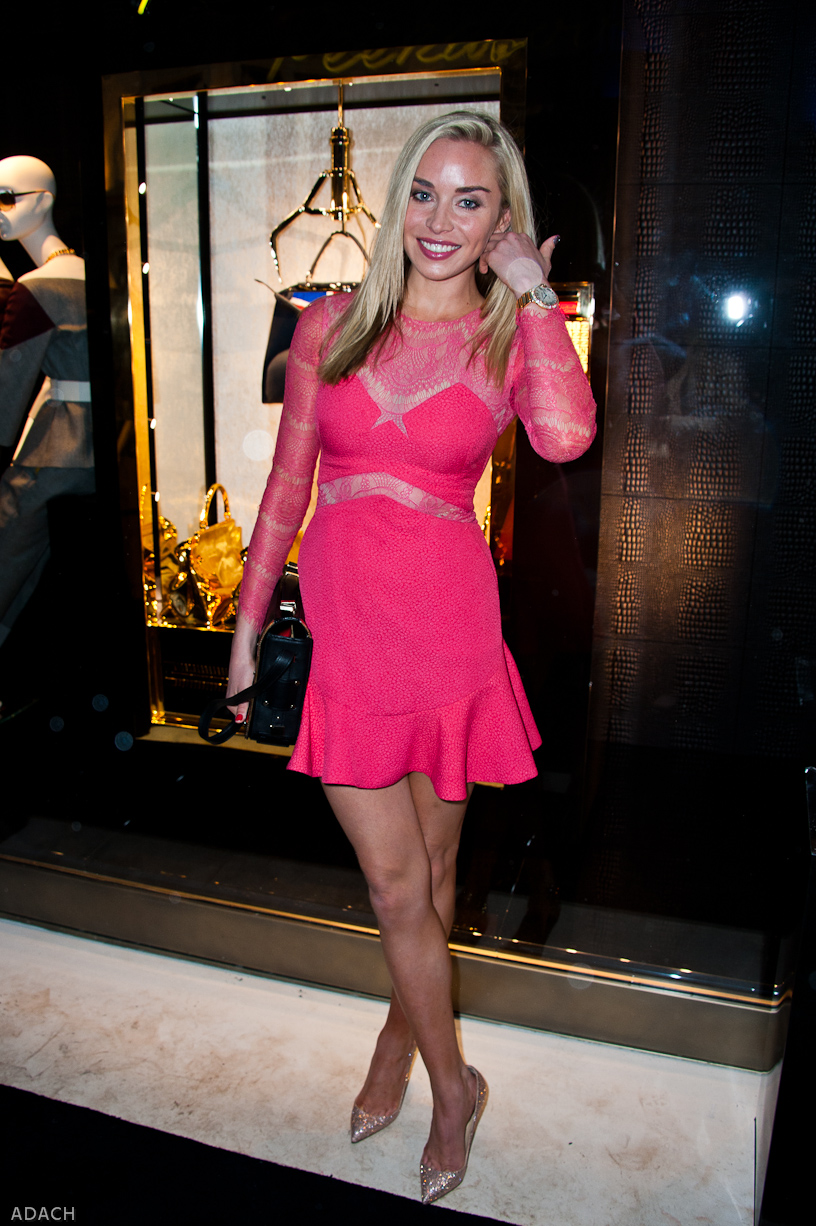
Noelle Reno

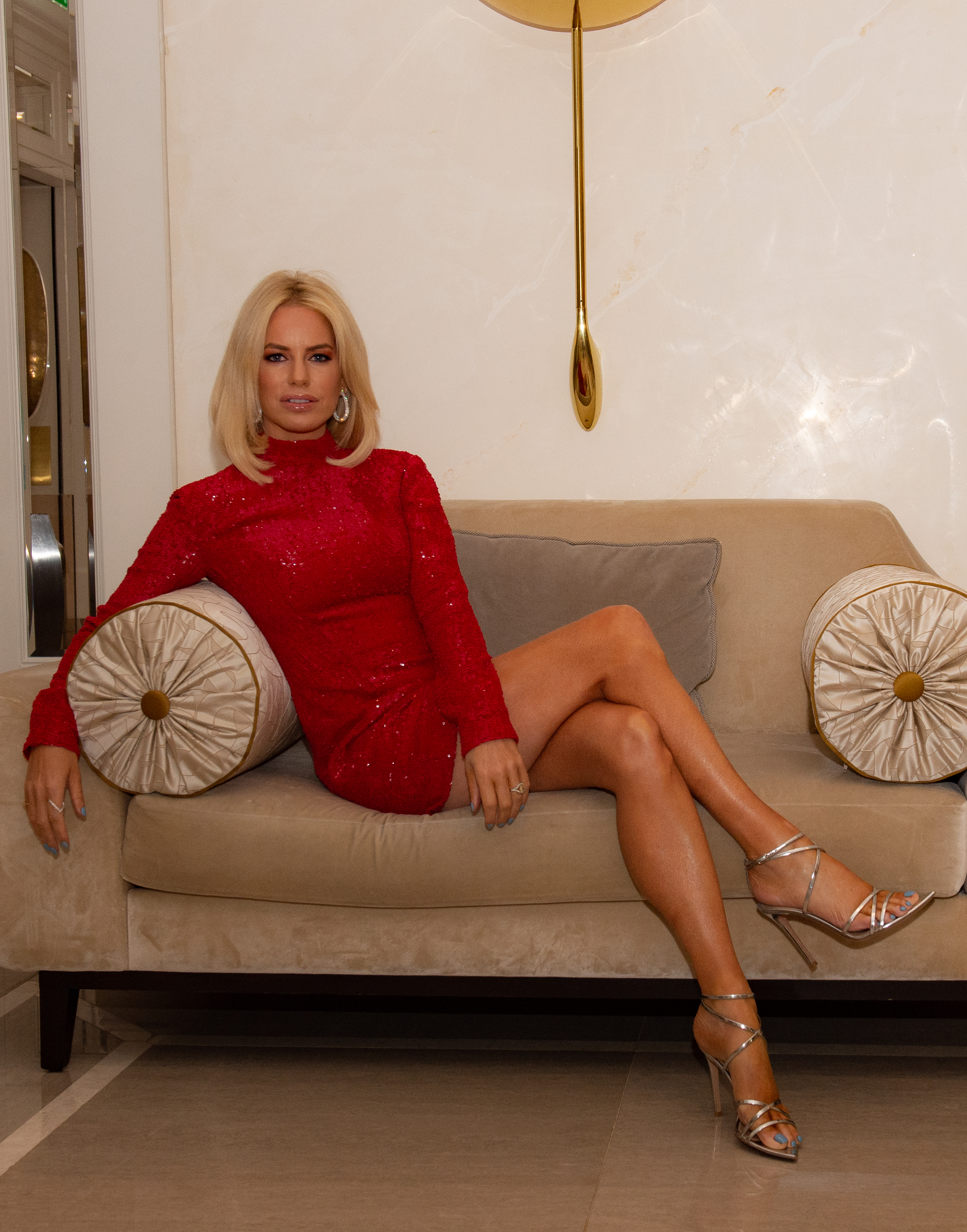
Caroline Stanbury

Main cast members
Cast member	Seasons			
Cast member	1	2	3	4
Juliet Angus	Main	Main	Main	
Caprice Bourret	Main			
Marissa Hermer	Main	Main	Main	
Annabelle Neilson	Main	Main		
Noelle Reno	Main			
Caroline Stanbury	Main	Main	Main	
Baroness Caroline Iuel-Brockdorff Fleming		Main	Main	
Julie Montagu, Viscountess Hinchingbrooke	Friend	Main	Main	
Sophie Stanbury		Friend	Main	
Missé Beqiri				Main
Lottie Kane				Main
Myka Meier				Main
Kimi Murdoch				Main
Martha, Lady Sitwell				Main
Margo Stilley				Main
Emma Thynn, Marchioness of Bath				Main
Mark-Francis Vandelli				Main
Friends of the ladies
Luke Henderson	Friend	Friend	Friend	
Kim Johnson		Guest	Friend	
Adela King			Friend	

== Episodes ==
=== Series overview ===
Season	Episodes	Originally released		Average Viewers (in millions)
Season	Episodes	First released	Last released	Average Viewers (in millions)
1	8	June 2, 2014	July 21, 2014	0.86
2	10	September 7, 2015	November 9, 2015	0.83
3	11	November 29, 2016	February 7, 2017	0.71
4	10	March 5, 2026	April 30, 2026	0.27

=== Season 1 (2014) ===
No. overall	No. in season	Title	Original release date	U.S. viewers (millions)
1	1	"My Fair Ladies of London"	June 2, 2014	1.17
2	2	"A Match Made in Tabloid Heaven"	June 9, 2014	0.79
3	3	"Red, White and Blue-Blooded"	June 16, 2014	0.72
4	4	"Mad as a Hatter"	June 23, 2014	0.75
5	5	"To the Manner Born"	June 30, 2014	0.96
6	6	"New Allegiances"	July 7, 2014	0.84
7	7	"I've Been to London to Visit the Queen"	July 14, 2014	0.78
8	8	"Guess Who's Coming to Dinner"	July 21, 2014	0.84

=== Season 2 (2015) ===
No. overall	No. in season	Title	Original release date	U.S. viewers (millions)
9	1	"London Calling"	September 7, 2015	0.91
10	2	"The Barefoot Baroness"	September 14, 2015	0.85
11	3	"We Are All One-sie"	September 21, 2015	1.00
12	4	"One Royal Hangover"	September 28, 2015	0.90
13	5	"Clean Up Your Mess"	October 5, 2015	0.68
14	6	"Are We Fired?"	October 12, 2015	0.88
15	7	"The Cougar In The Room"	October 19, 2015	0.81
16	8	"Something Rotten in Denmark"	October 26, 2015	0.89
17	9	"Unbelievable Balls"	November 2, 2015	0.86
18	10	"The New Queen Bee Bikini"	November 9, 2015	0.69

=== Season 3 (2016–2017) ===
No. overall	No. in season	Title	Original release date	U.S. viewers (millions)
19	1	"London Friends Are Falling Down"	November 29, 2016	0.61
20	2	"A Tale of Two Stanburys"	December 6, 2016	0.69
21	3	"Rules of Enragement"	December 13, 2016	0.75
22	4	"Tantrums and Titles"	December 20, 2016	0.75
23	5	"Dirty Martinis and Dirty Rumors"	December 27, 2016	0.77
24	6	"Tiaras Make You Tipsy"	January 3, 2017	0.78
25	7	"Tarts and Tartans"	January 10, 2017	0.59
26	8	"The Ladies in the High Castle"	January 17, 2017	0.72
27	9	"You Regatta Be Kidding Me"	January 24, 2017	0.76
28	10	"Loose Lips Sink Friendships"	January 31, 2017	0.68
29	11	"Dubai Felicia"	February 7, 2017	0.58

=== Season 4: The New Reign (2026) ===
No. overall	No. in season	Title	Original release date	U.S. viewers (millions)
30	1	"The New Reign"	March 5, 2026	0.30
31	2	"I Know What You Said This Summer"	March 5, 2026	0.21
32	3	"Whining in the Rain"	March 12, 2026	0.29
33	4	"Naked Truths"	March 19, 2026	0.27
34	5	"Martha in the Middle"	March 26, 2026	0.27
35	6	"Not So Fair Ladies"	April 2, 2026	0.23
36	7	"Horsing Around"	April 9, 2026	0.29
37	8	"Bad Manors"	April 16, 2026	0.29
38	9	"Whey Out of Line"	April 23, 2026	0.29
39	10	"The Summer Showdown"	April 30, 2026	0.28
