= Ice Queen (film) =

- DVD cover
- Directed by: Neil Kinsella
- Written by: Peter Beckwith; Neil Kinsella; David R. Williams
- Produced by: Peter Beckwith; David Giancola
- Starring: Ami Chorlton; Harmon Walsh; Noelle Reno; Jennifer Hill
- Cinematography: D. Anthony Giancola
- Edited by: Neil Kinsella; Devin Robinson
- Music by: Richard Alan Salz
- Production company: Edgewood Studios
- Distributed by: United States (home media): MTI Home Video
- Release date: June 7, 2005
- Running time: 92 minutes
- Country: United States
- Language: English

Ice Queen, originally titled Avalanche Run, is a 2005 American horror film co-written and directed by Neil Kinsella and starring Ami Chorlton. The principal photography was conducted in Vermont and the film was released directly to video on June 7, 2005 in the United States by the MTI Home Video media distributing company.

== Plot ==
Deep in the Amazon rainforest, a well-preserved woman dating from the ice age is found encased in amber. Her body is then loaded onto an airplane to be taken to a military facility where she can be studied by scientists. Dr. Thomas Goddard takes care of the woman on the plane, although he fails to notice when her heating system malfunctions, causing it to create freezing temperatures in her tube, and it awakens her into an angry ice-monster. Meanwhile, at a nearby mountain ski resort, mountain worker Johnny has a one-night stand with Elaine, who is applying for a job at the resort the next day. Few people are left at the resort as it has closed for the week, including Johnny, Elaine, Johnny's crush Tori, and her uncle Ed, who owns the resort, Johnny's friends Devlin, and Jessie, and fellow worker Audrey.

As the plane flies over the mountain, the pilot, Mac, holds Goddard at gunpoint, intending to sell the specimen for ransom. However, the Ice Queen awakens, and kills Mac before causing the plane to crash into the mountain, creating an avalanche in the process, trapping Johnny, Tori, Elaine, Audrey, Devlin, and Jessie inside the hotel, and Ed in the parking lot. The plane slides into the hotel as well during the avalanche, trapping Goddard, and the Ice Queen inside. The Ice Queen first kills Devlin alone in the hallway before attacking Jessie in a bathroom, where he manages to temporarily subdue her. Goddard soon encounters the group, revealing that if they heat her up enough, she'll die. Johnny later encounters the Ice Queen, who is shown to have a sexual attraction towards him.

Elaine is later attacked in the kitchen by the Ice Queen, and the others fight her, although she runs away. Audrey, and Goddard later find her in the dining room. Audrey attempts to fight her, but is killed while Goddard encourages his specimen to kill. The Ice Queen then attacks, and wounds Goddard, and chases Johnny, Tori, and Elaine through the hotel. The three attempt to reach the attic to escape to the surface, although Elaine is killed by the Ice Queen while Johnny, and Tori make it outside, and reunite with Ed. However, the Ice Queen follows them, and Johnny lures her into a nearby hot tub before scalding her to death. Johnny, Tori, and Ed then walk away from the scene, although, unbeknownst to them, an alive Goddard has made it to the surface, and takes a sample of the Ice Queen's remains, intending to clone her later on.

== Partial cast ==
- Ami Chorlton as Ice Queen
- Harmon Walsh as Johnny
- Noelle Reno as Tori
- Jennifer Hill as Elaine
- Daniel Hall Kuhn as Dr. Thomas Goddard
- Tara Walden as Audrey
- Peter Wyndorf as Devlin
- Demone Gore as Jessie
- John Romeo as Ed Banks
- Neil Benedict as Mac Johansen
- Duncan Murdoch as Fresh-Face
- Lucy The Dog as Patch

== Reception ==
Film Monthly praised the film's opening three minutes, and then spoke toward the film's subsequent perceived flaws in style, plot, and effects, concluding that while the film "suffers from some predictability in its plot, it develops some minor innovations that put it at a cut slightly above mediocre."

Screenwriter David R. Williams wrote "Actually, only the opening scene where the military convoy gets attacked and the concept of the airplane crashing into a mountain side and causing an avalanche to cover the ski resort are mine", explaining that his original screenplay Avalanche Run went through major changes due to producers and directors rewriting the script.

A sequel was planned soon after the film due to the ending of the original. However all plans for a sequel were shelved due to the films poor reception.

== See also ==
- Cinema of the United States
