= Institut Villa Pierrefeu =

Coordinates: 46.4320166°N 6.9247493°E

- Glion, Vaud; Switzerland

Information
- Type: Private, finishing school (boarding school)
- Motto: "A path where learning never ends." (Current) “Etiquette is not only about which fork to use; it is also about respecting how others think and act.” (Historical)
- Founded: 1954; 72 years ago
- Founder: Dorette Failletaz
- Authority: Federation of Swiss Private Schools (ISO 9001)
- Headmistress: Viviane Néri
- Staff: Philippe Neri; Chef Lei and others
- Gender: All-girls (school), co-ed (five-day seminars)
- Enrollment: 30-40 admitted/summer
- Campus type: Rural
- Tuition: $36,387 USD summer school (2017)
- Website: ivpworld.com

Institut Villa Pierrefeu (or simply Pierrefeu) is Switzerland's oldest standing finishing school, in Glion, Vaud, founded in 1954. Recognized as the "Harvard of finishing schools," it is a member of the Federation of Swiss Private Schools with the international school code of ISO 9001.

== History ==
The villa housing Pierrefeu was built in 1911 on a mountainside above Montreux, overlooking Lake Geneva. It was the home of a Dutch baroness. In 1954, Dorette Failletaz founded Institut Villa Pierrefeu, with Institut Le Rosey in the same canton and lower-tuition finishing schools located nearby.

Pierrefeu is the last remaining etiquette school born of the 19th-century Swiss finishing school tradition, with its own purpose-designed campus facilities and equipment resources. Such institutions were private, all-girls schools offering academic-year or semester courses to high-society, European leaders (e.g., Queen Anne-Marie of Greece, Diana, Princess of Wales, Princess Irene of Greece and Denmark, and Princess Elena of Romania) to "finish" their education with practical skills applicable to social graces and future household management. Students were typically ages 16–18.

=== 1970s-present: Generational leadership ===
Viviane Néri bought Pierrefeu from her mother (the school's founder) in 1971 and manages it today. She expanded from the dwindling gap year market of the U.K. and Germany, to women from global economies, including Asia and South America. The curriculum language changed from French to English, with Pierrefeu being one of the first to teach non-Western customs (including those of BRIC countries). Household management has become a more peripheral subject. Art history, interior decorating, sewing (applicable in designer fashion), and childcare are no longer taught.

In the 1980s, Pierrefeu accommodated up to 34 students. In 1987, the Los Angeles Times reported that it reached full occupancy annually. The school was threatened by a law proposal that summer, which would have limited the ability of global students to board in Switzerland. The government restriction did not pass.

In the 1990s, Pierrefeu was primarily occupied by students from North America and South America, with a decrease in Japanese and European attendance. Around this time, it was common for Néri to conduct daily room inspections, as posters were not allowed on bedroom walls. Brochures read: "A complete universe dedicated to the instruction of the art of living. The school of life."

In 2012, Néri reported that enrollment from the U.K., the traditional finishing school population, was rising again, along with Hong Kong and China.

In 2013, Pierrefeu opened up to hosting a five-day seminar for men and women in the professional service industry. Her son, Philippe Neri, led the process, along with administration and strategy today as third-generation management. The alumni network comprises 4,200+ women from 120 countries across the world.

== Overview ==
=== Programs ===
==== Gap-year boarding program ====
Historically, Pierrefeu offered a gap-year, boarding program beginning in autumn, targeting girls between secondary school and college education. In 1987, students had 38 hours of classes weekly. Lessons ran from 8:15am to 5:00pm. A 7pm curfew was enforced on weekdays, 9pm on Fridays and Sundays, and 11pm on Saturdays.

Néri claimed that drug problems were minimal. One or two girls were expelled every year.

=== Education ===
Subjects taught over 12–14 hours per weekday have included:

(Professionalism and social etiquette)

- business etiquette and public relations (including crisis management),
- French language,
- European etiquette and protocol,
- international savoir-vivre (history, culture, and customs of 20+ countries across all continents),
- advanced etiquette (mandatory for the IEP diploma) and appropriate conversation

(Event organization, applicable for nonprofit benefits etc.)

- hosting,
- art history,
- floral art design (winning 3 of 6 historical rankings in the local L'Art De La Table Competition at Touzeau),
- table decorating and service,
- culinary arts,
- oenology,
- ballroom dancing

(Life)

- personal presentation (image consulting)
- efficient household management (including interior decorating),
- sewing (applicable in designer fashion),
- childcare

One teaching method Pierrefeu has long-used includes regular, practice formal dinners. Roleplaying as either guests, hosts, or servants (requiring the proper dress), students learn how to cook and serve at least five, diversified cultural dinners, with the final exam involving formal dinner prep and hosting. Additionally, it is ensured that students leave the school knowing how to make their own beds, iron their own clothes, and keep their own private bathrooms clean.

=== Tuition ===
Excluding application fees and school-authored reference books, in 1986, parents paid Fr.44,000 ($26,000 USD) tuition for the gap-year program.

As the most expensive finishing school, Pierrefeu increased tuition to $30,000 just a year later, compared to all of the average similar institutions at the time charging $18,000 (approximately half).

In 1990, tuition further increased to $33,000 for a 7.5 month gap-year program.

In 2012, tuition for Institut Villa Pierrefeu increased to $36,387 for a summer school diploma (a higher cost of attendance for a more compact instruction period, mirroring college tuition increases).

== Notable alumni ==
- Myka Meier, American-British entrepreneur and etiquette coach
- Sara Jane Ho, a Hong Kong etiquette coach and star of the Netflix show, Mind Your Manners

== See also ==
- Federation of Swiss Private Schools
- Institut Le Rosey
