= Scot Young =

Scottish property developer (1962-2014)

- Born: Scot Gordon Young; 10 January 1962; Dundee, Scotland, UK
- Died: 8 December 2014 (aged 52); London, England, UK
- Occupation: Property developer
- Spouse: Michelle Orwell (m. 1995; sep. 2006)
- Partner: Noelle Reno (2009–2014)
- Children: 2

Scot Gordon Young (10 January 1962 – 8 December 2014) was a Scottish property developer, who came to media attention during a protracted and bitter divorce case brought by his former wife Michelle. He claimed to have lost all his assets in a bad property deal, but his ex-wife claimed he was worth “billions” and that the family court should force Scot to pay her several hundred million pounds.

Michelle managed to persuade the court that Scot had failed to provide complete financial information, and he was jailed for six months. He suffered psychologically, and he received psychiatric support following his release. In 2014, he fell to his death from a window in the London flat of Noelle Reno, his former girlfriend. The subsequent inquest ruled that the Police were correct to say there were no suspicious circumstances surrounding the death.

== Early life ==
Scot Gordon Young was born on 10 January 1962, and raised at No. 8 Clepington Street, in the Stobswell area of Dundee, Scotland, the son of Duncan Young, a former Dundee United football player, and his wife Betsy.

== Property career ==
Young began to make money in the property boom of the 1980s, with some help from his father-in-law. During his long divorce battle, he claimed he had lost all his money in a failed property venture in Moscow. However, a leaked document showed that he had used a Panama-based law firm, Mossack Fonseca, and other offshore businesses to hide assets in Russia, the British Virgin Islands and Monaco. As of August 2017, no funds had been recovered.

== Divorce and imprisonment ==
Young was married to Michelle Danique Orwell for eleven years, between 1995 and 2006. Michelle's divorce applications lasted nearly a further eight years. Young claimed that a failed Russian property deal had left him in debt; Michelle disagreed, and in some media reports she alleged that he had "a few billion pounds at least". In the court proceedings, Michelle alleged he had £400 million. In January 2013, she applied to have him imprisoned for failing to provide all the information requested about his finances. The family court judge sentenced him to six months' imprisonment for contempt of court.

In November 2013, after 65 court hearings, the judge awarded Michelle £20 million plus several million in legal costs. In December 2015, Michelle claimed never to have received a penny of this settlement, and set up a campaign group, the Michelle Young Foundation. Her lawyers are suing her for £11.2 million in unpaid fees. As of June 2018, despite spending millions in the search, none of the £400 million that Michelle persuaded the family court Young still retained has been located.

At the time of his death, Young lived at 33 Montagu Square with his former girlfriend, Noelle Reno, an American fashion entrepreneur and former model, whom he had started dating in 2009. The couple separated two months before his death.

== Death ==
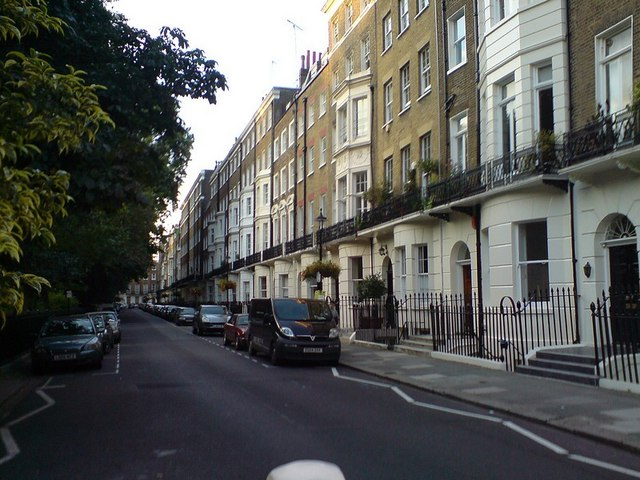
West side of Montagu Square, London

Young died on 8 December 2014 after falling from a fourth-floor flat and being impaled on railings at 33 Montagu Square, Marylebone, London. Before his death, he phoned his ex-girlfriend Reno, and told her, "I'm going to jump out of the window. Stay on the phone; you will hear me." Young had recently completed time in prison as a result of his former wife's application to the family court. Although mentally stable prior to his wife's divorce proceedings and his subsequent imprisonment, he was diagnosed with bipolar disorder and had been treated for drug and alcohol abuse following this radical change in his life.

An investigation by BuzzFeed in 2017 suggested that US spy agencies believed that the Russian state was involved in the death, and alleged that UK police shut down the investigation without conducting forensics tests or investigating Young's alleged business ties with enemies of Russian President Vladimir Putin: said investigation was later made into a TV series, Once upon a time in Londongrad. However, the subsequent inquest ruled that although there was insufficient evidence to declare the death a suicide, there were no suspicious circumstances around the death.
