= Glion =

Village in Vaud, Switzerland

Coordinates: 46°25′58″N 6°55′33″E

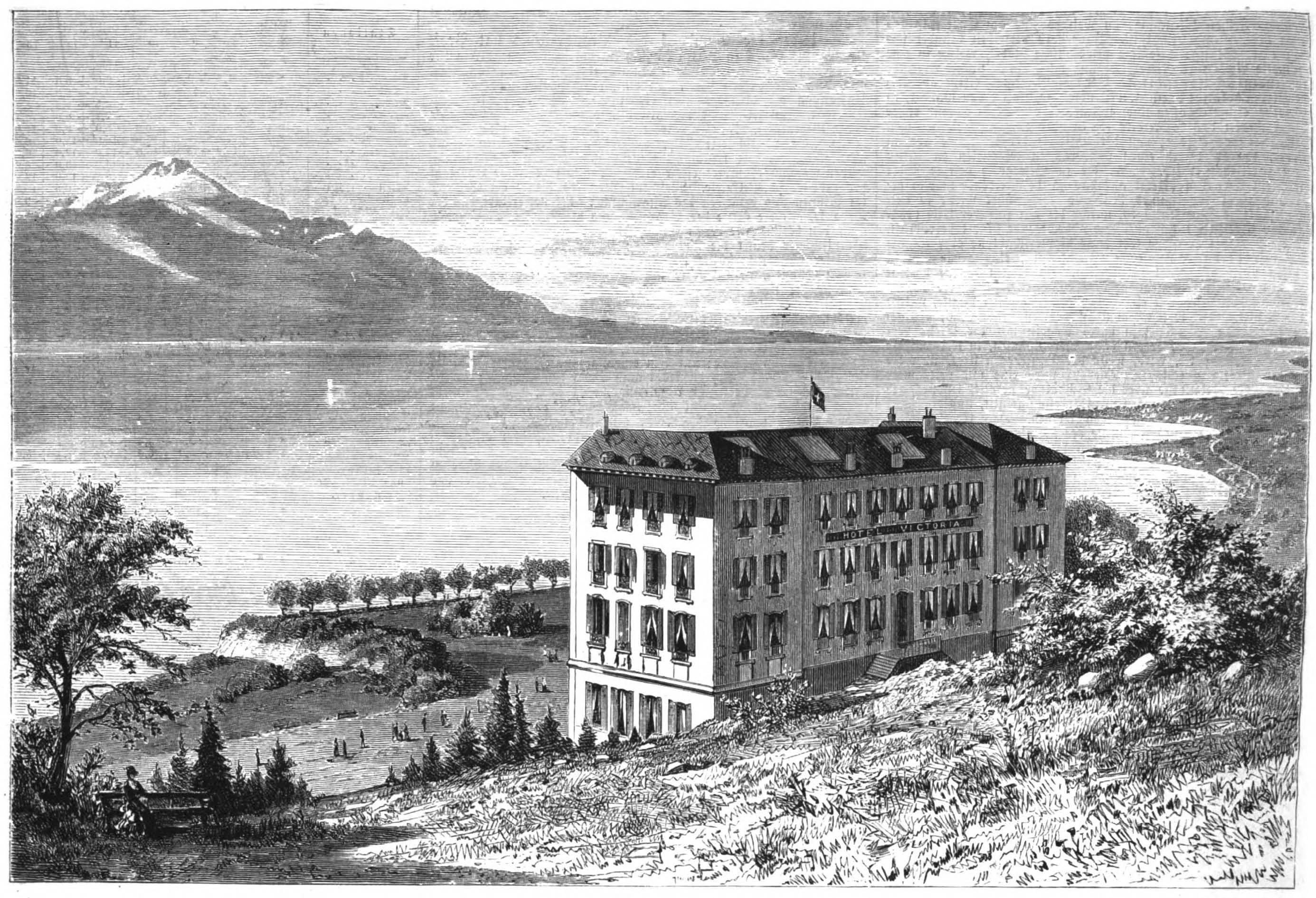
Hotel Victoria in Glion, 1878

Glion et le Grammont, c. 1910

Aerial view, 1948

Glion (French pronunciation: [ɡlijɔ̃]) is a village in the municipality of Montreux in the canton of Vaud, Switzerland. The village is located 700 meters above sea level, overlooking Lake Geneva. The position of this village in Montreux and the Chauderon Gorge made it a tourist destination in the 19th century.

Glion is known for being the first headquarters of the Glion Institute of Higher Education hospitality school. It is also the location of the Institut Villa Pierrefeu, Switzerland’s oldest finishing school, as well as the location of the Swiss chalet and boarding house of London’s Hill House International Junior School, where pupils of the school stay during geography, choir, and ski trips.

The first conference of the higher education think tank Glion Colloquium was held in Glion.

Glion is also where Henri Nestlé, founder of Nestlé, died of a heart attack in 1890.

== See also ==
Media related to Glion (Vaud) at Wikimedia Commons
