= Luc E. Weber =

Swiss academic

Luc E. Weber (born 18 September 1941) is the Rector Emeritus of the University of Geneva and the Founding President of the Glion Colloquium.

== Biography ==
Luc E. Weber received a PhD in Economics and Business from the University of Lausanne. From 1975 to 2006, he was Professor of Public Economics at the University of Geneva. He has taught at the University of California, Los Angeles, and the Universities of Lausanne and Fribourg. From 1977 to 1980, he was a member of the Swiss Council of Economic Advisers. He has been Vice-Rector, then Rector of the university of Geneva, and Chairman and Consul for international affairs of the Swiss University Rectors’ Conference.

He was a founding member of the European University Association. He is a co-founder of the Glion Colloquium. He was a member and later chair of the Steering Committee for Higher Education and Research of the Council of Europe. From 2002 to 2008, he was Treasurer and Vice-President of the International Association of Universities. He was a member of the Austrian Accreditation Council and on the administrative board of the University of Strasbourg, the Jean Monnet Foundation for Europe, the Foundation Board of the International Red Cross and Red Crescent Museum. He also worked for the World Bank.

== Bibliography ==
- Pour une politique conjoncturelle en Suisse, Luc E. Weber (author) (1971)
- L'Analyse économique des dépenses publiques, Luc E. Weber (author) (1978)
- Le Financement du Secteur public, Luc E. Weber (author) Bernard Dafflon (author) (1984)
- Les Finances publiques d'un Etat fédératif, La Suisse, Luc E. Weber (éd.) 1992
- L'Etat, acteur économique, Luc E. Weber (author) (1987, 3e éd 1997)
- Challenges Facing Higher Education at the Millenium, Luc E. Weber (ed.), Werner Hirsch (ed.) (1999)
- Governance in Higher Education: The University in a State of Flux, Luc E. Weber (ed.), Werner Hirsch (ed.) (2001)
- As the Walls of Academia Are Tumbling Down, Luc E. Weber (ed.), Werner Hirsch (ed.) (2003)
- Reinventing the Research University, Luc E. Weber (ed.), James Johnson Duderstadt (ed.), 2004
- Public Responsibility for Higher Education And Research (co-edited with Sjur Bergan, 2005)
- Universities and Business: Partnering for the Knowledge Society, Luc E. Weber (ed.), James Johnson Duderstadt (ed.), 2006
- The Legitimacy of Quality Assurance in Higher Education: The Role of Public Authorities and Institutions, (co-edited with Katia Dolgova-Dreyer, 2007)
- The Globalization of Higher Education, Luc E. Weber (ed.), James Johnson Duderstadt (ed.), 2008
- University Research for Innovation, Luc E. Weber (ed.), James Johnson Duderstadt (ed.), (2010)
- Global Sustainability and the Responsibilities of Universities, Luc E. Weber (ed.), James Johnson Duderstadt (ed.), (2012)
- Preparing Universities for an Era of Change, Luc E. Weber (ed.), James Johnson Duderstadt (ed.), (2014)
- L'Université au XXI siècle, Luc E. Weber (author) (2015)
- University Priorities and Constraints, Luc E. Weber (ed.), James Johnson Duderstadt (ed.), (2016)
- The University in the 21st Century, Luc E. Weber (author) (2016) (translation of References
- The Future of the University in a Polarizing World, Luc E. Weber (ed.), Howard Newby (ed.), (2018)
- The University at the Crossroads to a Sustainable Future, Luc E. Weber (ed.), Bert van der Zwaan (ed.), (2018)
- Economie et Finances publiques, Luc E. Weber (author), Milad Zarin-Nejadan (author) and Alain Schgönenberger (author), (2018)
