= The Real Housewives of Dubai =

American reality television series

- Genre: Reality
- Starring: Nina Ali; Sara Al Madani; Chanel Ayan; Caroline Brooks; Lesa Milan; Caroline Stanbury; Taleen Marie
- Country of origin: United States
- Original language: English
- No. of seasons: 2
- No. of episodes: 29 (list of episodes)

Production
- Executive producers: Steven Weinstock; Glenda Hersh; Lauren Eskelin; Jamie Jakimo; Brandon Panaligan; Glenda N. Cox; Chelsey Stephens; Giovanni Wilson; Andy Cohen
- Camera setup: Multiple
- Running time: 41–43 minutes
- Production company: Truly Original

Original release
- Network: Bravo
- Release: June 1, 2022 – September 17, 2024

The Real Housewives of Dubai, abbreviated RHODubai, is an American reality television show that premiered on Bravo since June 1, 2022. Developed as the network's first original international installment of The Real Housewives franchise, it aired for two seasons and focused on the personal and professional lives of several women living in Dubai, United Arab Emirates.

== Overview ==
The first season aired from June 1 to September 7, 2022. The original cast consisted of Nina Ali, Sara Al Madani, Chanel Ayan, Caroline Brooks, Lesa Milan and Caroline Stanbury. Stanbury previously starred on the Bravo show Ladies of London. Phaedra Parks of The Real Housewives of Atlanta appeared in a recurring guest role. Lystra Adams of The Real Housewives of Cheshire made a guest appearance during the season finale. Ali announced her departure from the series in January 2023.

In November 2023, it was confirmed that the second season would premiere in 2024, with Taleen Marie joining the series as the newest housewife. The second season aired from June 2 to September 17, 2024. Newcomer Saba Yussouf joined as an official "friend of the housewives". Dawn Ward of The Real Housewives of Cheshire made a guest appearance during the seventh and thirteenth episode. Former housewife Ali made guest appearances during the eleventh and thirteenth episode.

In November 2024, Bravo placed the series on hiatus. On January 1, 2025, cast member Caroline Brooks confirmed in a tweet that she along with the rest of the cast were told by producers that the show would not be renewed for a third season, before being thanked for their participation and wished "all the best of luck," despite Bravo never announcing an actual cancellation.

== Cast ==
Cast member	Seasons	
Cast member	1	2
Nina Ali	Main	Guest
Chanel Ayan	Main	Main
Caroline Brooks	Main	Main
Sara Al Madani	Main	Main
Lesa Milan	Main	Main
Caroline Stanbury	Main	Main
Taleen Marie	Guest	Main
Friends of the housewives
Saba Yussouf		Friend

== Episodes ==
The Real Housewives of Dubai episodes
Season	Episodes	Originally released		Average Viewers
Season	Episodes	First released	Last released	Average Viewers
1	14	June 1, 2022	September 7, 2022	0.59
2	15	June 2, 2024	September 17, 2024	0.29

== Reception ==
=== Critical response ===
Reaction to the series has been generally negative, with praise for picturesque portrayals of the Dubai architectural wonders. The presentation of the show is lopsidedly devoid of Islamic legal restrictions and values, with brief mentions centering around Chanel Ayan with dialogue seeming to be "rehearsed one-liners." Although it's been admitted, "The relevant authorities are not responsible and do not verify the accuracy of the information contained in the show. The primary purpose of this series is to entertain" with initial announcement of the series bringing controversy of filming in a country with laws infringing against homosexuality and women's rights. The women's rights and gay rights controversy was also in light of another controversy of the show being brought as result of the local Emiratis in Dubai and the UAE who felt that the show does not represent Dubai or Dubai housewives at all, as well as referring to members of the cast as "gold diggers".
