= Marissa Hermer =

American and British businesswoman and television personality (born 1981)

- Born: Marissa I Anschutz; December 30, 1981 (age 44); Laguna Beach, California, U.S.
- Citizenship: United States; United Kingdom
- Education: Middlebury College
- Occupations: Businesswoman, television personality
- Television: Ladies of London (2014–2017)

Marissa I Hermer (née Anschutz; born December 30, 1981) is an American and British businesswoman and television personality. She is best known as a main cast member on the Bravo reality television series Ladies of London (2014–2017).

== Early life ==
Marissa I Anschutz was born in Laguna Beach, California on December 30, 1981, and was raised in Newport Beach, California. She graduated from Middlebury College in Vermont.

== Career ==
Hermer appears as a main cast member on the Bravo reality television series Ladies of London. The first season ran from June 2, 2014 to July 21, 2014. The second season ran from September 7, 2015 to November 9, 2015. The third season ran from November 29, 2016 to February 7, 2017.

Hermer appeared on the ITV daytime magazine programme This Morning on October 7, 2014.

Hermer is a restaurateur. She is the owner of Bumpkin restaurants in London, and Eclipse. She is part of the family business, the Ignite Group, a UK-based international food, beverage and entertainment corporation. Her first solo project, Top Dog, opened in May 2015, and was closed in July 2016.

Hermer appeared on the talk show Steve Harvey on December 11, 2015.

Hermer appeared on the Bravo pop culture-based late-night talk show Watch What Happens Live with Andy Cohen on February 6, 2017.

Hermer authored An American Girl in London: 120 Nourishing Recipes for Your Family from a Californian Expat: A Cookbook (ISBN 9781623368166), which was published by Rodale, Inc. on April 4, 2017.

Hermer appeared on the Hallmark Channel daytime talk show Home & Family on April 4, 2017.

Hermer appeared on the WGN-TV morning television news show WGN Morning News on April 26, 2017.

== Personal life ==
Hermer (then Anschutz) married Matthew Daniel "Matt" Hermer (born 1971) in 2010, having met two years earlier. They have three children together, two sons and a daughter. The couple split their time between their home in Chelsea, London and their estate in Pacific Palisades, Los Angeles. She filed for divorce in the San Bernardino County Superior Court on June 5, 2024. The filing was listed as a legal separation with minor children.

Hermer fled her home during the 2025 California wildfires.

== Filmography ==
Year	Title	Notes
2014–2017	Ladies of London	29 episodes
2014	This Morning	1 episode
2015	Steve Harvey	1 episode
2017	Watch What Happens Live with Andy Cohen	1 episode
2017	Home & Family	1 episode
2017	WGN Morning News	1 episode
