= Finishing school =

School for young women

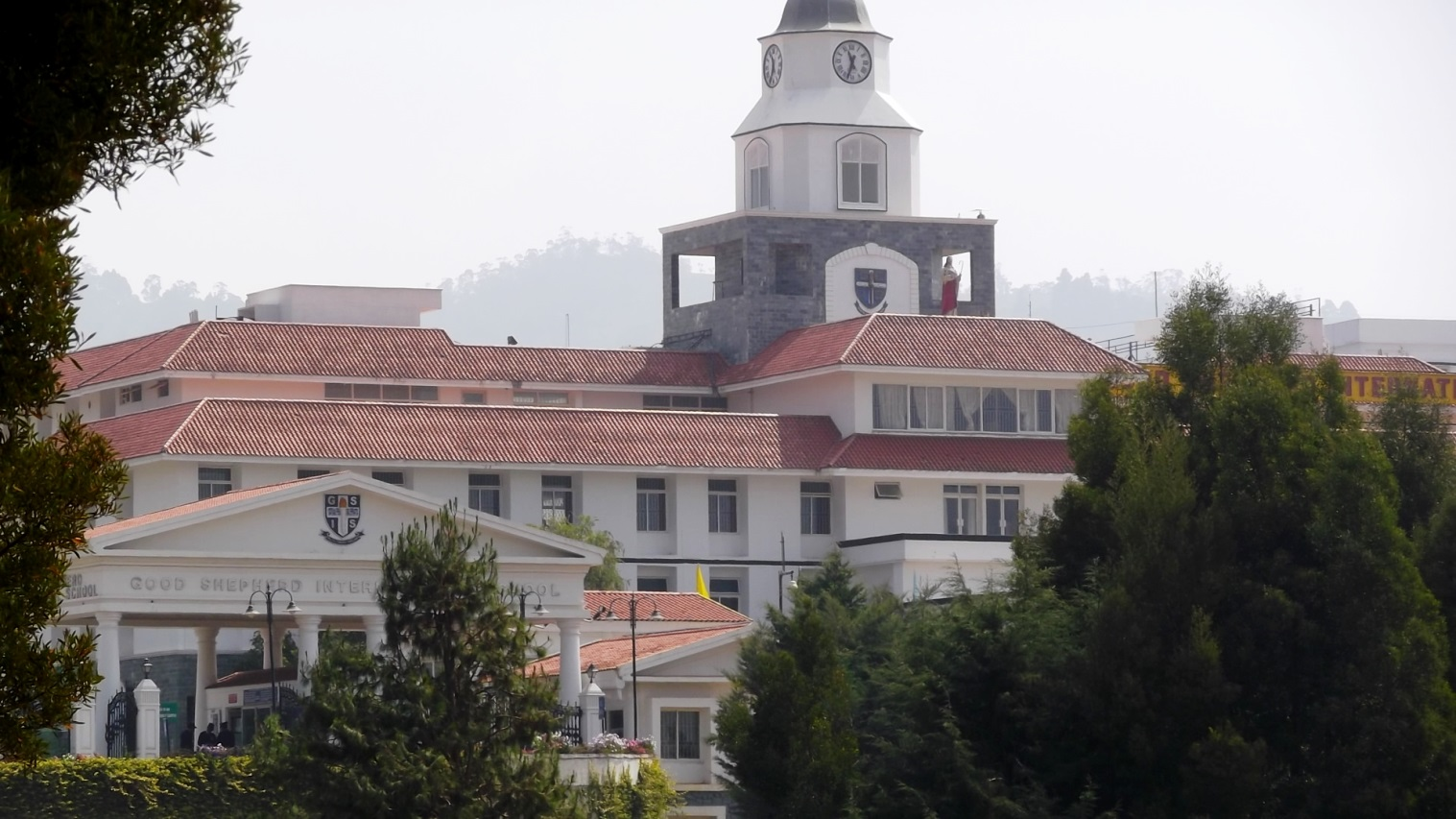
Good Shepherd Finishing School in 2013.

A finishing school focuses on teaching young women social graces and upper-class cultural rites as a preparation for entry into society. The name reflects the fact that it follows ordinary school and is intended to complete a young woman's education by providing classes primarily on deportment, etiquette, and other non-academic subjects. The school may offer an intensive course or a one-year program. In the United States, a finishing school is sometimes called a charm school.

Graeme Donald claims that the educational ladies' salons of the late 19th century led to the formal finishing institutions common in Switzerland around that time. At the schools' peak, thousands of wealthy young women were sent to one of the dozens of finishing schools available, starting at age 16. The primary goals of such institutions were to teach students the skills necessary to attract a good husband and to become interesting socialites and wives.

The 1960s marked the decline of the finishing schools worldwide. This decline can be attributed to the shifting conceptions of women's role in society, competition from more focused vocational or professional education routes, to succession issues within the typically family-run schools, and sometimes to commercial pressures driven by the high value of the properties that the schools occupied. The 1990s saw a revival of the finishing school, although the business model was radically altered.

== By country ==
=== Switzerland ===
In the early 20th century, Switzerland was known for its private finishing schools. Most operated in the French-speaking cantons near Lake Geneva. The country was favoured by parents and guardians because of its reputation as a healthful environment, its multi-lingual and cosmopolitan aura, and the country's political stability.

==== Notable examples ====
The finishing schools that made Switzerland renowned for such institutions included:

- Brillantmont (founded in 1882, now an international secondary school that offers a 'grade 14' or graduate year of cultural studies) and Château Mont-Choisi (founded in 1885, closed in 1995 or 1996). Both were in Lausanne. The Maharani of Jaipur (1919-2009) studied at Brillantmont. In her memoir, she portrayed the time as a happy one, in which she wrote letters to her husband-to-be and pursued skiing and other sports. Actress Gene Tierney (1920–1991) also attended Brillantmont, speaking only French and holidaying with fellow-students in Norway and England.
- Château Mont-Choisi was attended by Carla Bruni-Sarkozy, as well as by Princess Elena of Romania, Monique Lhuillier, actress Kitty Carlisle, Saudi scholar Mai Yamani and New York socialite Fabiola Beracasa-Beckman. It was one of the first Swiss finishing schools in the 19th century and in its early years a pioneer in secondary education. It was owned by an Italian family for five years prior to its closure (due to financial reasons) after over 100 years of educating women. Like many of its peers, it adopted a serious secondary-education programme in the early 20th century.
- Institut Alpin Videmanette in Rougemont was attended by Diana, Princess of Wales (1961-1997), Princess Irene of Greece and Denmark, Tiggy Legge-Bourke and Tamara Mellon. Lady Diana was sent to Alpin Videmanette by her father after failing all her O-Levels. She had met the Prince of Wales that year.
- Mon Fertile in Tolochenaz, educated Queen Camilla and Ingrid Detter de Lupis Frankopan.
- Institut Le Mesnil was attended by Queen Anne-Marie of Greece after completing her high-school education at the nearby Le Chatelard School, also in Montreux. Le Mesnil, owned by the Navarro family, closed in 2004. Le Chatelard today offers education in the American model of junior high and high school up to the age of 17. The organization today offers savoir vivre and culinary courses along the lines of traditional finishing schools, but these supplement rather than replace academic subjects.
- Le Manoir, in Lausanne, educated British secret agent Vera Atkins (1908–2000) and a sister of the king of the Albanians. It had a private beach and students were taken skiing in St Moritz.
- Institut Villa Pierrefeu in Glion, Vaud, founded in 1954, is the last remaining traditional Swiss finishing school.

=== United Kingdom ===
- In London there were a number of schools in the 20th century including the Cygnet's House, the Monkey Club, St James and Lucie Clayton. The latter two merged in 2005 to become St James and Lucie Clayton College and were joined by a third, Queens (a secretarial college), to become the current Quest Professional, although the curriculum stopped offering any etiquette or protocol training, which was instead absorbed by a former Lucie Clayton tutor, who started The English Manner in 2001, when Lucie Clayton wound up. It is in London's Victoria district and offers business administration courses for students aged 16–25 years old. It is coeducational.
- Eggleston Hall was located in County Durham and taught young ladies aged 16–20 from the 1960s until the late 1980s.
- Evendine Court in Malvern began in the late 19th century as a small school which taught young ladies the duties of their families' household staff by requiring them to complete domestic work themselves. Courses typically lasted six weeks. By 1900, the school had become popular. It extended to several buildings and included a working dairy farm to teach practical farming. During the Second World War, it adopted more traditional finishing school subjects for young women unable to travel to Europe. Pupil numbers remained high until the mid-1990s, with a broader curriculum covering cordon bleu cookery, self presentation, and secretarial skills. It closed in 1998.
- Winkfield Place in Ascot specialised in culinary expertise and moved to a new location in Surrey around 1990 when it joined with Moor Park Finishing School before Moor Park closed in 1998/99. Winkfield Place was founded by women's educator Constance Spry as a flower arranging and domestic science school and had an international reputation. It taught girls across three terms of an academic year, with the possibility of studying Le Cordon Bleu courses with Rosemary Hume in a fourth term.

About a decade after these schools had closed, mostly by the end of the 20th century, public relations and image consultancy firms started to appear in London offering largely 1- or 2-day finishing courses and social skills at commercial rate fees which were proportionately far higher than those charged by the schools.

The old finishing schools were stand-alone organizations that lasted 15–50 years and were often family-run. Curricula varied between schools based on the proprietor's philosophy, much like the British private school model of the 18th and 19th centuries. Some schools offered some O-level and A-level courses or recognised arts and languages certificates. They sometimes allowed pupils to retake a course they may not have passed at the secondary school level. They often taught languages and commercially and/or domestically applicable skills, such as cooking, secretarial, and later business studies, with the aim of broadening the students' horizons from formal schooling education.

=== United States ===
Through much of their history, American finishing schools emphasised social graces and de-emphasised scholarship: society encouraged a polished young lady to hide her intellectual prowess for fear of frightening away suitors. For instance, Miss Porter's School in 1843 advertised itself as Miss Porter's Finishing School for Young Ladies—even though its founder was a noted scholar offering a rigorous curriculum that educated the illustrious classicist Edith Hamilton.

Today, with a new cultural climate and a different attitude to the role of women, the situation has reversed: Miss Porter's School downplays its origins as a finishing school, and emphasises the rigour of its academics. Likewise, Finch College on Manhattan's Upper East Side was "one of the most famed of U.S. girls' finishing schools", but its last president chose to describe it as a liberal arts college, offering academics as rigorous as Barnard or Bryn Mawr. It closed in 1976.

The term finishing school is occasionally used, or misused, in American parlance to refer to certain small women's colleges, primarily on the East Coast, that were once known for preparing their female students for marriage. Since the 1960s, many of these schools have closed as a result of financial difficulties. These stemmed from changing societal norms, which made it easier for women to pursue academic and professional paths.

== In literature ==
Lace, a novel by Shirley Conran, is set in a finishing school and follows the lives of four young women who meet there. Journalist Sarah Hughes argued that despite the novel being most memorable for its graphic sex scenes "in reality the book is filled with pages of argument about a woman's right to work, the need for equal pay and the juggling of children and career".

The Finishing School, a 2004 novel by Scottish author Muriel Spark, concerns 'College Sunrise', a present-day finishing school in Ouchy on the banks of Lake Geneva near Lausanne in Switzerland. Unlike the traditional finishing schools, the one in this novel is mixed-sex.
