= Chanel Ayan =

Kenyan model (born 1978)

- Born: 7 June 1978 (age 48); Malaba, Kenya
- Occupations: Model; businesswoman; television personality
- Years active: 1996–present
- Known for: The Real Housewives of Dubai
- Spouse: Chris Pillott (m. 1995)
- Relatives: Ubah Hassan (cousin)
- Modeling information
- Height: 5 ft 10 in (1.78 m)
- Hair color: Black
- Eye color: Brown

Chanel Ayan Pillott (born 7 June 1978) is a Somali model, businesswoman and television personality. She has worked with a number of top designers including Chanel, Tiffany & Co., Cartier, Valentino and Dolce & Gabanna. She is the founder of Ayan Beauty and Ayan Skin, her brand of makeup, alongside makeup artist Toni Malt. Ayan is also known for starring in the Bravo reality series The Real Housewives of Dubai, which she joined in the show's first season.

== Early life ==
Ayan was born in Malaba, Kenya, a small town along the Kenya-Uganda border. Due to her father's alcoholism, she was raised mostly by her mother, attending school in both Kenya and Uganda as a child. She grew up with five other siblings. She is very close with two of them, Ifrah and Sadiq.

At the age of 5, both Ayan and her sister Ifrah experienced forced genital mutilation and female circumcision against their will so they would "remain virgins until marriage," a practice that is still very prominent in some parts of Africa, Asia and the Middle East. The mutilation occurred when Ayan's aunt and grandmother brought both her and her sister to a house, where they were tied to a bed and circumcised.

At the age of 14, her father unsuccessfully attempted to sell her into marriage, however, this was prevented by her sister.

Ayan uses her platform to shed light on what she believes is "a barbaric practice." She refers to herself as a "survivor" that was "utterly betrayed by her culture."

== Career ==
At the age of 18, Ayan relocated to São Paulo, Brazil, in order to pursue a career in modelling. Then, shortly after moved to New York City, United States with Elite Models, then finally moved to Dubai, United Arab Emirates in 2005.

Ayan has modelled for several fashion houses such as Chanel, Dior, Moschino, Cartier, Dolce & Gabbana, Tiffany & Co., Valentino, and Louis Vuitton., while also having worked in an advertising campaign for Emirates and the Dubai Tourism Company, becoming the first black person to do so. She has also appeared the covers of Forbes, Elle magazine and Harper's Bazaar. She also made history by being the first ever black supermodel to feature on the cover of a Dubai-based magazine. Ayan is also the "muse" for Amato Couture, being dressed in outfits made for artists such as Beyoncé, Lady Gaga and Nicki Minaj.

In 2021, she became head of runway from Miss Universe UAE.

In 2022, Ayan was announced to be part of the first season of The Real Housewives of Dubai along with Nina Ali, Caroline Brooks, Dr. Sara Al Madani, Lesa Milan and Caroline Stanbury, with its premiere taking place on June 1, 2022. After the success of the shows first season, Ayan launched her makeup brand AYAN Beauty alongside her makeup artist Toni Malt.

== Filmography ==
| Year | Title | Notes |
|---|---|---|
| 2022–2024 | The Real Housewives of Dubai | Main cast |
| 2022 | Watch What Happens Live! | Guest, 4 episodes |
| 2023 | The Real Housewives of New Jersey | Episode: "Teresa Gets Married" |
| 2025 | The Traitors | Season 3 contestant |
| 2026 | The Real Housewives Ultimate Girls Trip: Roaring 20th | Guest, 3 episodes (Season 5) |
| 2026 | The Real Housewives of Potomac | Episode: "Something in the Water" |

== Personal life ==
While in Brazil, she met her husband Chris Pillott, from Idaho, United States, when she was 19. The pair got married in a private ceremony in Brazil. Together they have a son, born in 2005, named Taj Pillott.

In an interview with Vanguard, Ayan changed her name from "Ayan Pillott" to "Chanel Ayan" when she entered the modelling industry. This name was chosen after being inspired by the true story of Chanel, called Coco Before Chanel, feeling that she connected with different aspects of Coco Chanel's life, like how her father lived in the same town, without her knowledge or how she was raised in an orphanage, because her father moved on, forgetting about her.

She is a cousin of fellow model Ubah Hassan, who is one of the stars of The Real Housewives of New York City.
