= Caroline Stanbury =

British television personality

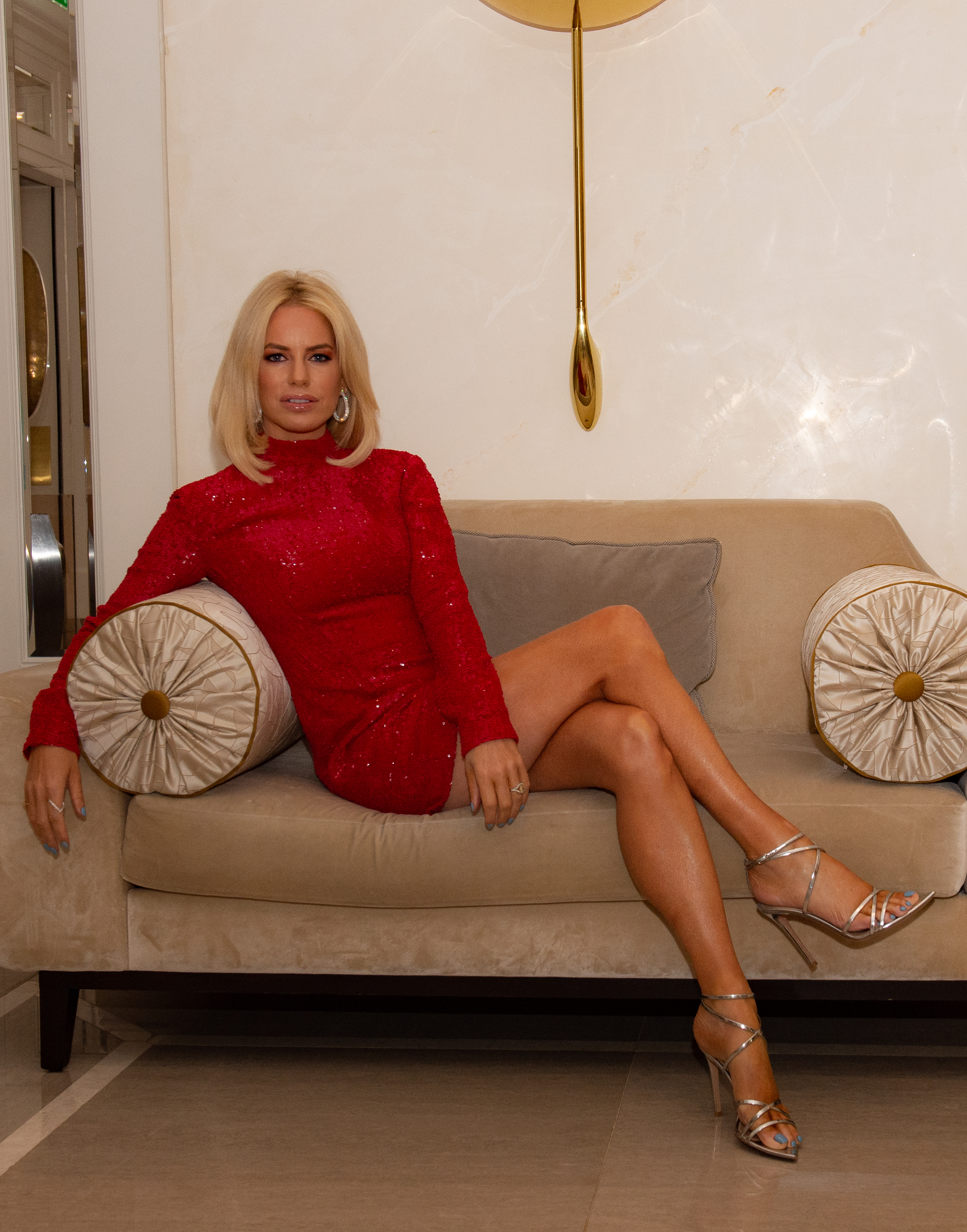
- Stanbury at Hôtel de Paris in 2019
- Born: Caroline Alice Stanbury; 28 April 1976 (age 50); London, England, UK
- Occupation: Television personality
- Years active: 2008–present
- Known for: Ladies of London; The Real Housewives of Dubai
- Spouses: Cem Habib (m. 2004; div. 2019) Sergio Carrallo (m. 2021)
- Children: 3
- Parent(s): Anthony Stanbury, Elizabeth Stanbury (born baele)

Caroline Alice Stanbury (born 28 April 1976) is a British businesswoman and reality television personality. She is best known for appearing as an original main cast member on Bravo's reality television series Ladies of London from 2014 until 2017 and The Real Housewives of Dubai from 2022 until 2024.

== Career ==
Stanbury joined the cast of Ladies of London in 2014. She returned for the second and third season until it was cancelled in 2017 following her move to Dubai. In 2022, Stanbury was announced to be part of the first season of The Real Housewives of Dubai along with Nina Ali, Chanel Ayan, Caroline Brooks, Sara Al Madani and Lesa Milan. It premiered on 1 June 2022. In 2025, Stanbury was profiled by UAE-based media for her transition into Dubai's business scene, where she engaged with the luxury and entrepreneurial ecosystem.

Before joining Ladies of London, Stanbury started her own business named "Gift Library". It was a store that sold luxury, "swanky" gifts. However during her time on Ladies of London, she had to close down her business, where it was subsequently sold to Amara.com. Stanbury has also launched a shoe line named "Black Suede Studio". In 2020, Stanbury started the podcast "Divorced Not Dead", where she talks about her life and relationships.

== Personal life ==
Stanbury attended the Westonbirt School followed by King's College London. In 2004, she married Turkish banker Cem Habib. They have three children together. In 2016, Stanbury moved to Dubai, United Arab Emirates, following a job offer her husband received. In December 2019, after 15 years of marriage, Stanbury and Habib announced their separation. In 2021, she married Spanish footballer Sergio Carrallo, who is 19 years her junior. She legally got married in Mauritius due to the UAE not recognising interfaith marriages, but this law changed around the same time, so she held her ceremony in Dubai.

== Filmography ==
Year	Title	Role	Notes	Ref
2014–2017	Ladies of London	Herself	Full Time	
2014	This Morning	Herself	1 episode, guest	
2015–2022	Watch What Happens Live with Andy Cohen	Herself	4 episodes, guest	
2019	Million Dollar Listing Los Angeles	Herself	1 episode, guest	
2022–2024	The Real Housewives of Dubai	Herself	Housewife (seasons 1–2)	
2026	The Traitors	Herself	Contestant (Eliminated; 19th place)	
