= Patsy Kensit =

English actress, singer and model (born 1968)

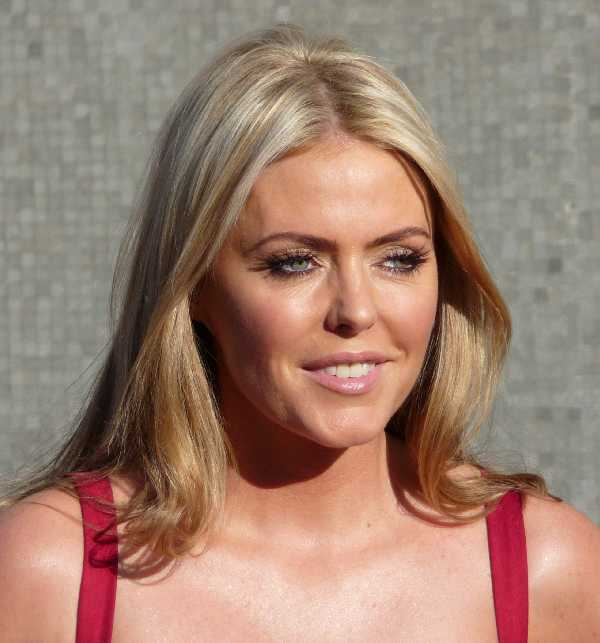
- Kensit in 2009
- Born: Patricia Jude Francis Kensit; 4 March 1968 (age 58); Lambeth, London, England
- Education: Corona Theatre School; Italia Conti Academy of Theatre Arts
- Occupations: Actress; singer
- Years active: 1972–present
- Television: Emmerdale; Holby City; EastEnders
- Spouses: Dan Donovan (m. 1988; div. 1991); Jim Kerr (m. 1992; div. 1996); Liam Gallagher (m. 1997; div. 2000); Jeremy Healy (m. 2009; div. 2010)
- Children: 2
- Musical career
- Genre: Pop
- Instrument: Vocals
- Years active: 1983–1989
- Label: Sony Music
- Formerly of: Eighth Wonder
- Modelling information
- Height: 5 ft 6 1/2 in (1.69 m)
- Hair colour: Blonde
- Eye colour: Blue
- Agency: Models 1
- Website: patsykensit.com

Patricia Jude Francis Kensit (born 4 March 1968) is an English actress, singer, and model. Beginning her career as a child actor, Kensit first gained attention when she acted in a string of commercials for Birds Eye frozen peas. She went on to appear in films such as The Great Gatsby (1974), Gold (1974), Hennessy (1975), The Blue Bird (1976) and Hanover Street (1979). In 1983, Kensit formed and became the lead singer of the pop band Eighth Wonder, which released the top-20 hits "I'm Not Scared" and "Cross My Heart" before disbanding in 1989.

Kensit achieved further success in her breakthrough role as Suzette in the musical film Absolute Beginners (1986) and as Rika van den Haas in Lethal Weapon 2 (1989) before starring in the films Twenty-One (1991), Blame It on the Bellboy (1992), Angels & Insects (1995) and Grace of My Heart (1996), and has since starred in a number of both big-budget and independent films.

Following a return to television, between 2004 and 2006, and again between 2026 and 2027, Kensit plays the role of Sadie King in the ITV soap opera Emmerdale and then that of Faye Morton in the BBC One medical drama Holby City from 2007 to 2010, and again for an episode in 2019. Throughout 2023, she played Emma Harding in EastEnders.

Kensit has been married to musicians Dan Donovan, Jim Kerr, Liam Gallagher, and Jeremy Healy. Kensit's personal life, particularly her high profile marriages to Kerr and Gallagher, has drawn considerable tabloid press and media attention, notably through the Cool Britannia cultural period. Kensit has been referred to as a cultural and style icon, and an it girl, of the 1990s.

Kensit was nominated for the Young Artist Award for Best Juvenile Actress in a Motion Picture for her role in Hanover Street (1979). In 1991, she was nominated for the Independent Spirit Award for Best Female Lead in Twenty-One (1991), and later had several nominations for her role in Emmerdale.

== Early life and education ==
Patricia Jude Francis Kensit was born on 4 March 1968, at the General Lying-In Hospital, Lambeth, to James and Margaret Rose (née Doohan). Kensit's maternal grandparents hailed from County Leitrim, Ireland. She has an older brother, Jamie. Her mother was a secretary at Dior and former model, who had previously dated Aga Khan IV, while Kensit's father was a close associate of both the Kray Twins and the Richardson Gang, earning himself the nickname "Jimmy the Dip", and was involved in the Great Train Robbery. He served time in prison before Kensit was born and used a cover as an antiques dealer. Kensit's godfather was Reggie Kray. Her paternal grandfather was a robber and counterfeiter. Kensit recalled travelling to the Caribbean, Paris, and Marbella during her childhood with her father in attempts to evade capture by the police. When her father was jailed for a time in the late 1970s, Kensit and her brother were told to say that he was "working in South Africa".

Kensit spent her childhood living on a council estate in Hounslow. She attended Newland House School, St Catherine's School, Twickenham, and then Corona Theatre School.

== Career ==
=== 1972–1983: Early work and rise to fame ===
In 1972, at the age of four, Kensit appeared in a television advertisement for Birds Eye frozen peas. She also regularly appeared in newspaper advertisements modelling children's clothing. Kensit had her first big-screen role in the film For the Love of Ada. Her next film role was two years later in The Great Gatsby, with Robert Redford and Mia Farrow, the latter of whom she portrayed in the 1995 biopic, Love and Betrayal: The Mia Farrow Story. Later in 1974, she played a missing child in an episode of Z-Cars, and had a small role in the thriller film Gold alongside Roger Moore and Susannah York. She then starred in Alfie Darling (1975) with Joan Collins, and Hennessy (1975) as the daughter of Rod Steiger's character.

Following this, Kensit had a leading role in the 1976 Soviet-American co-production, The Blue Bird, and she struck up a friendship with actress and co-star Elizabeth Taylor. Taylor told the press about Kensit that "This little girl is going to be the biggest name in showbusiness". From 1977 to 1978, Kensit had a regular role in the drama series The Foundation, and in 1978 she appeared in five episodes of the Armchair Thriller serial Quiet as a Nun. She portrayed a young Oscar François de Jarjayes in the 1979 movie Lady Oscar, based on the Rose of Versailles by Riyoko Ikeda. In 1979, Kensit starred in the war-romance film Hanover Street, opposite Harrison Ford and Christopher Plummer. She was nominated for Young Artist Award for Best Juvenile Actress in a Motion Picture at the Young Artist Awards for her role in the film.

By the early 1980s, Kensit had become a regular face on screen. She appeared in several television period dramas including The Legend of King Arthur, Prince Regent, and Penmarric, and in 1981, she starred as Estella in the BBC adaptation of Great Expectations. She then played the role of Lady Margaret Plantagenet in the 1982 BBC Television Shakespeare production of Richard III. In the same year, she starred as the title character in The Magical World of Disney television movie The Adventures of Pollyanna, and appeared in the music video for "Nobody's Fool" by Haircut One Hundred. In 1983, she starred as the leading character in the sci-fi TV series Luna.

=== 1983–1989: Dual career, Eighth Wonder and Absolute Beginners ===
By this time, Kensit had ventured into the Soho club scene with her older brother Jamie and socialised with stars such as George Michael, Sade, and Boy George; the thriving music scene and the exposure to the New Romantic era piqued Kensit's interest in music, and in 1983 she became a backing singer in Jamie's band Spice, which included Steve Grantley and Geoff Beauchamp. The band was later renamed Eighth Wonder and Kensit became the lead vocalist. Eighth Wonder began with moderate success and performed at various wine bars, pubs, and university venues, and Kensit began to also write songs for the band. Eighth Wonder's first single, "Stay with Me", was released in October 1985. Due to Kensit's involvement in the group, they achieved much publicity.

Kensit pursued a dual career as a singer and an actress. In 1984, she played the title role in the drama series Diana and starred in the children's television play The Prattling Princess. In 1985, she starred in the film The Corsican Brothers. At this time she played the role of Eppie in an adaptation of Silas Marner, with Ben Kingsley.

This is the face that has launched a thousand quips. Sexy and sultry. Seventeen and knows it. The face of the year. Patsy Kensit is THE girl everyone is talking about. Absolute Beginners is THE film. Blonde hair, blue eyes, and the kind of sensational style to wear a skirt to a Royal Premiere that was nothing much more than the washing instructions. Patsy Kensit has arrived and survived the avalanche of hype that threatened to smother Absolute Beginners before it even reached the screen.

— Peter Trollope of the Liverpool Echo detailing Kensit's appeal amidst the publicity for Absolute Beginners.

In 1986, she won the lead female role in the film version of Absolute Beginners, based on the book by Colin MacInnes, after Stephen Woolley, co-owner of Palace Films, and director Julien Temple watched her perform with Eighth Wonder at the Queen Elizabeth College in Kensington. The group also contributed a song to the film; although the it did not perform particularly well, the film and the promotion surrounding it brought both Kensit and the group much media attention.

Kensit and Eighth Wonder achieved particular success in Italy and Japan; a performance of their song "Will You Remember" at the Sanremo Music Festival in February 1987 resulted in a wardrobe malfunction for Kensit which boosted sales and sent the song to the Top 10 of that country. In November 1987, she sang a duet with the Italian singer and songwriter Eros Ramazzotti, entitled La luce buona delle stelle ("The Good Light of the Stars").

In 1988, Kensit and Eighth Wonder had two Top 40 singles. "I'm Not Scared", written by Neil Tennant and Chris Lowe and produced by the Pet Shop Boys and Phil Harding (for PWL), which reached Number 7 in the British charts, and became the group's most successful single. The other Top 40 single, "Cross My Heart", reached Number 13. That year also saw Kensit have a role in the Italian film Don Bosco.

Eighth Wonder's final charted song in the UK was the single "Baby Baby", whilst their final hit was "Use Me" which charted in Japan in 1989.

=== 1989–2004: Lethal Weapon 2 and continued success ===
Although Eighth Wonder's success had waned by 1989, the group disbanded and Kensit focused solely on her acting career, appearing in the 1989 film Lethal Weapon 2 as Rika van den Haas, a South African consulate secretary with whom detective Martin Riggs, played by Mel Gibson, falls in love. Later that year, Kensit starred in the film A Chorus of Disapproval directed by Michael Winner, and in the television film Arms and the Man with Helena Bonham Carter. In 1990, she starred in Chicago Joe and the Showgirl with Kiefer Sutherland and the German film Kill Cruise, and made a cameo appearance in the comedy film Bullseye!, again directed by Winner.

In 1991, Kensit had roles in the Italian action film Blue Tornado and the American sci-fi thriller Timebomb, before starring in Prince of Shadows opposite Terence Stamp. She had a leading role in the romantic comedy television film, Does This Mean We're Married? during which she sings the song "Rambo Doll".

Kensit starred in the 1991 film Twenty-One, for which she received a nomination for Independent Spirit Award for Best Female Lead. Of her role, Variety magazine wrote, "Fans of Kensit get plenty of her; her lovely face and form are always the center of attention. The cool control with which she executes the role is admirable". In 1992, she had a leading role in the British film Blame it on the Bellboy. In 1993, Kensit starred in the science-fiction film Full Eclipse, and in 1994 she had a main role opposite James Fox in the wartime drama miniseries Fall from Grace which marked the fiftieth anniversary of the Normandy landings.

In 1995, Kensit played Mia Farrow in the biopic Love and Betrayal: The Mia Farrow Story, and starred with Kristin Scott Thomas and Mark Rylance in Angels & Insects, which was directed by Philip Haas, and was nominated for an Academy Award for Costume Design. Later that year, she starred in the films At the Midnight Hour and Tunnel Vision. In 1996, Kensit had a main role in the musical Grace of My Heart. In 1998, Kensit, alongside Meg Mathews, provided backing vocals for the Oasis song "All Around the World". In 2000, she portrayed Angie Best in Best, a biopic of the footballer George Best. Kensit starred in an adaptation of Mary Higgins Clark's novel Loves Music, Loves to Dance (2001). In 2002, Kensit starred in the Newcastle-based The One and Only.

=== 2004–2010: Return to television ===
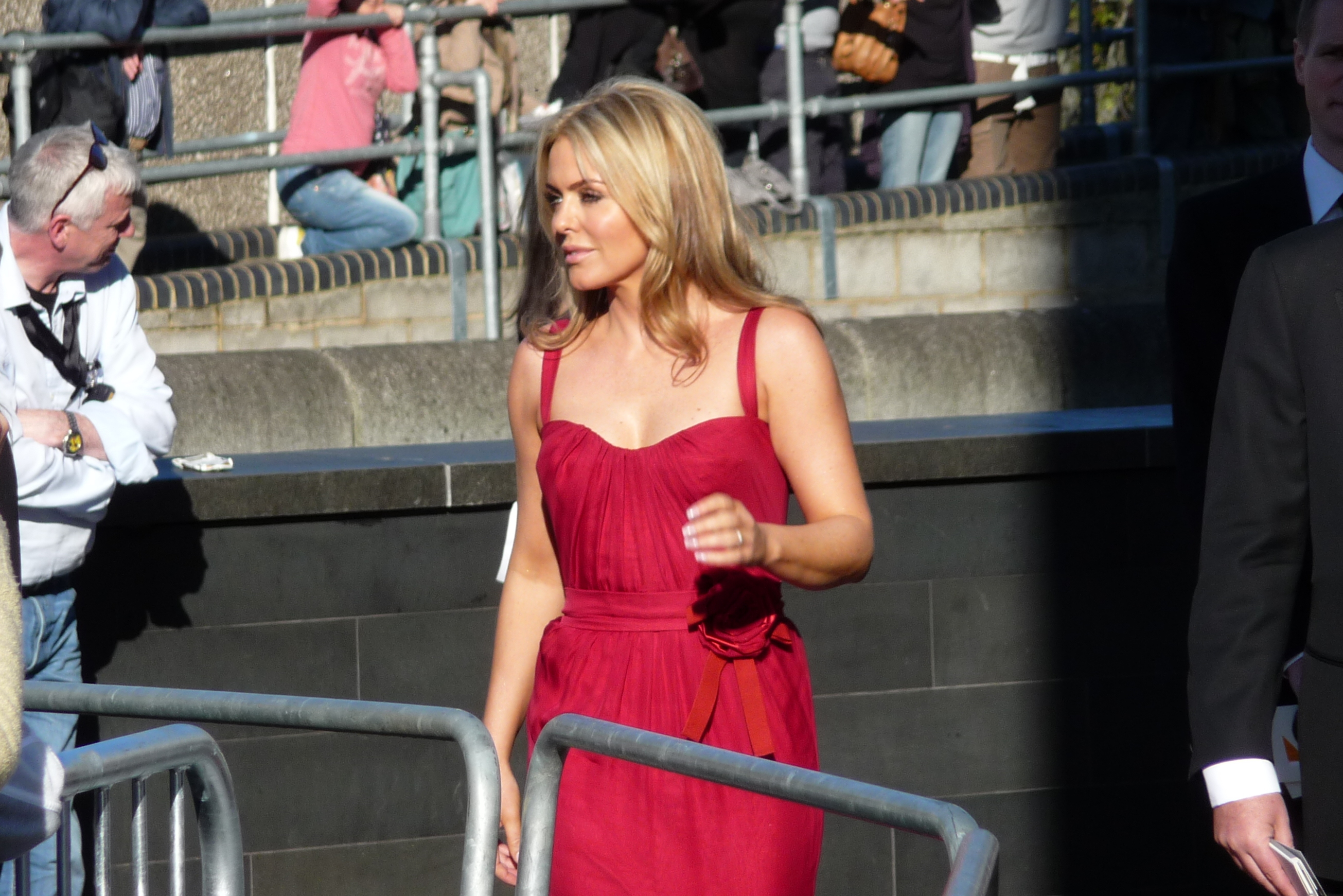
Kensit at the BAFTA Awards in 2009

In 2004, Kensit joined the cast of soap opera Emmerdale as Sadie King, and also regularly featured in the third series of Channel 4's Bo' Selecta!, along with its 2005 spin-off series A Bear's Tail. In September 2006, Kensit left Emmerdale, stating that commuting to Yorkshire and the time away from her sons was too stressful.

In September and October 2005, Kensit appeared as a celebrity contestant in Ant & Dec's Gameshow Marathon, progressing through to Play Your Cards Right, before being eliminated by Carol Vorderman. On 23 June 2006, Kensit guest hosted The Friday Night Project with band Placebo. She appeared as the Grand High Witch of all the World at the Children's Party at the Palace in celebration of Queen Elizabeth II's 80th birthday in 2006. She also became the voice of online gambling website 32red.com. In 2006, Kensit starred as a gangster's moll in the crime film Played alongside Val Kilmer and Vinnie Jones, and in 2007 she had a role in the children's fantasy adventure film The Magic Door with Jenny Agutter and Anthony Head.

In January 2007, Kensit joined the BBC One medical drama Holby City as ward sister Faye Morton. On 14 March 2010, it was revealed that she had decided to leave the show. In May 2019, it was announced that Kensit would reprise her role as Faye Morton for an episode, later in the year.

In August 2008, Kensit appeared as a subject in the sixth series of Who Do You Think You Are?. Until Bruce Forsyth's episode broadcast in July 2010, it became the highest-rated episode for the programme, being seen by 7.10 million viewers. As of 2023, it is still the second-highest rating episode of the programme.

=== 2010–2019: Reality television and other ventures ===
In September 2010, Kensit participated as a contestant on the eighth series of Strictly Come Dancing. She was partnered with professional dancer Robin Windsor. They were the eighth couple to be eliminated from the competition, finishing in seventh place.

On 15 May 2012, she narrated the Channel 4 documentary Sex, Lies and Rinsing Guys. In October 2013, Kensit released her autobiography, titled Absolute Beginner, published by Sidgwick & Jackson. On 7 April 2014, Kensit was a guest panellist on ITV chat show Loose Women. On 7 January 2015, Kensit took part as a housemate in the fifteenth series of Celebrity Big Brother. She was the third celebrity to be evicted from the House, after spending 21 days.

In 2016, Kensit began presenting her own radio show, The Lunchtime Show with Patsy Kensit, on Mellow Magic which was broadcast on weekdays between 12pm and 2pm.

In 2018, Kensit started her Conscious Puberty campaign, which came about after she experienced significant challenges during the menopause. She now uses the campaign across social media channels to converse with other women of every age. That same year, alongside Lorraine Kelly, Kensit launched the "You Know Breast" campaign to raise awareness of breast cancer, and urging women to check their breasts for symptoms.

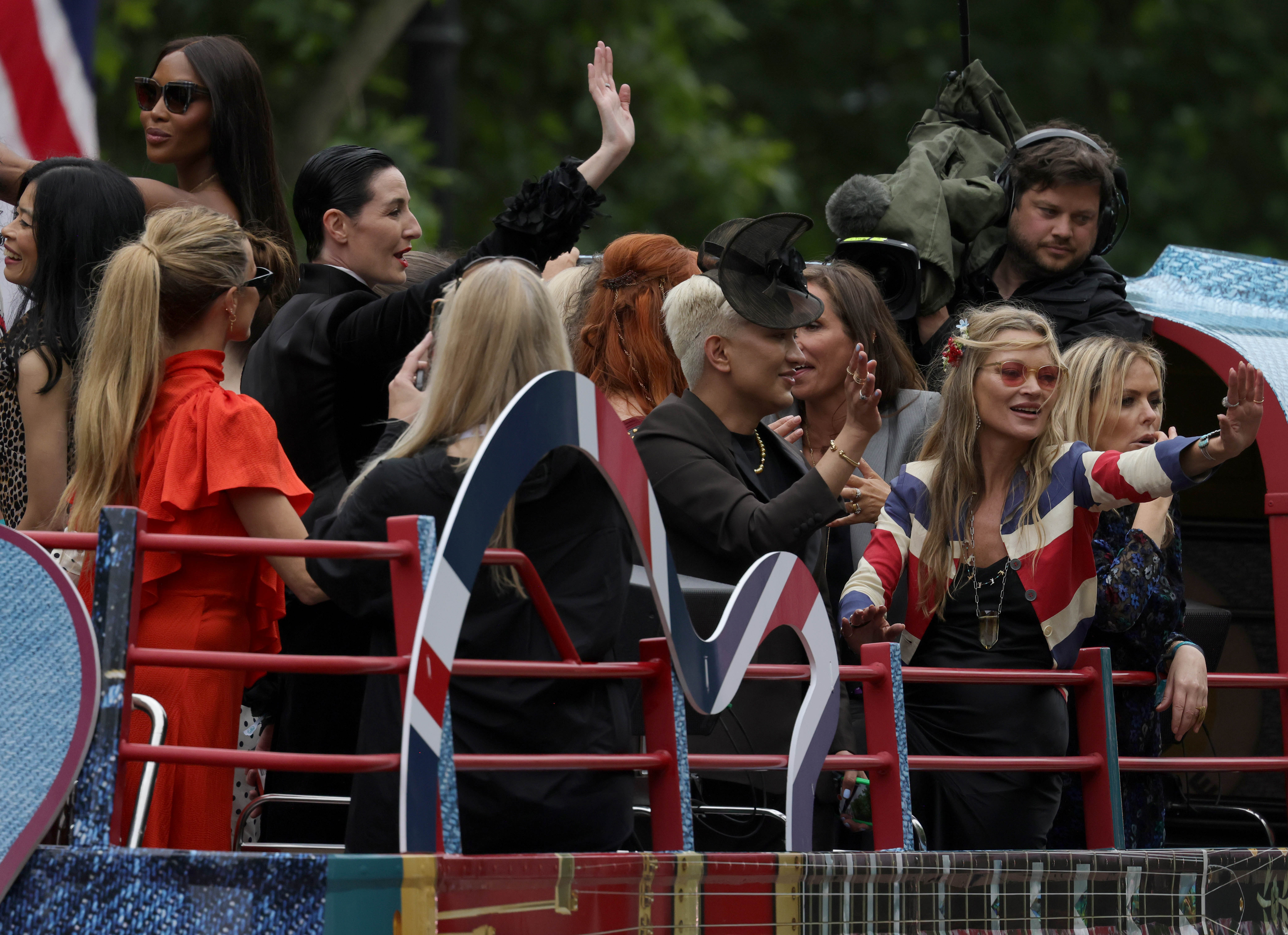
Kensit (far right) taking part in the Platinum Jubilee Pageant in 2022

=== 2019–present: Film projects, EastEnders and Emmerdale return ===
In March 2021, Kensit appeared on BBC Two's Richard Osman's House of Games. Later that year, she made a guest appearance in an episode of McDonald & Dodds and starred in the film The Pebble and the Boy. In June 2022, Kensit took part in the Platinum Jubilee Pageant as part of Queen Elizabeth II's Platinum Jubilee celebrations; Kensit, alongside Kate Moss, Naomi Campbell and others represented the decade of the 1990s. In October 2022, Kensit starred in the action thriller film Renegades alongside Lee Majors, and Danny Trejo.

In November 2022, it was announced that Kensit would join the cast of the BBC soap opera EastEnders as Emma Harding, the biological mother of Lola Pearce (Danielle Harold). Kensit made her first on-screen appearance as Emma on 25 January 2023. Kensit latest appearance to date in EastEnders was broadcast in September 2023. In December 2023, Kensit guest starred in the Death in Paradise Christmas special. She starred in two films in 2025, Borley Rectory: The Awakening alongside Julian Glover, and A Scottish Christmas Secret, a festive movie in which she played Caprice Bourret's sister. In April 2026, Kensit took part in the BBC television series Pilgrimage walking from Whitby Abbey to Holy Island.

In May 2026, ITV announced that Kensit had agreed to reprise her role as Sadie King in Emmerdale after twenty years away, signing a six-month contract lasting until December 2026. Her comeback episode was broadcast on 2 September 2026.

== Personal life ==
=== Marriages and family ===
Kensit has been married and divorced four times. Following relationships with model Barry Kamen and singer Richard Darbyshire, in 1988, Kensit married Dan Donovan of the band Big Audio Dynamite at a register office in Scarborough during the filming of A Chorus of Disapproval, but the couple divorced in 1991. After her divorce from Donovan, Kensit had a short relationship with actor Terence Stamp during and after the filming of Prince of Shadows. In 1992, she married Jim Kerr, lead singer of Simple Minds. During the marriage, she gave birth to a son, James. Kensit and Kerr divorced in 1996.

Shortly after separating from Kerr, Kensit began dating Liam Gallagher from the band Oasis. The couple became the subject of intense media scrutiny and became known for their lifestyle, parties and high-profile social life, as well as public disputes and displays of affection. Kensit and Gallagher married in April 1997 at Marylebone Town Hall. Kensit and Gallagher became members of the Primrose Hill set and became synonymous with the Britpop and Cool Britannia cultures, with the couple being referred to as the "President and First Lady of Britpop" by the media. In 1999, Kensit and Gallagher had a son, Lennon, named after John Lennon; his godmother is actress Elizabeth Hurley, Kensit's co-star in the film Kill Cruise. Following reports of Gallagher's infidelity, including fathering a child to singer Lisa Moorish two months into his and Kensit's marriage, the couple separated and divorced in 2000.

Following a relationship with footballer Ally McCoist in 2001, Kensit later became involved with rap artist and beatboxer Killa Kela. They separated a year later. She later began a relationship with the DJ Jeremy Healy and announced that she was marrying for a fourth time on 29 November 2007. On 31 March 2008, it was reported that the couple had split by mutual consent and had called off their wedding. They later reconciled, and married on 18 April 2009. During the marriage, Kensit was known as "Patsy Kensit-Healy". It was reported in February 2010 that the couple had separated, with their divorce confirmed later in the year.

Kensit has also been romantically linked with musician Gary Kemp, singer Andrew Ridgeley, footballer Ryan Giggs, singer Michael Hutchence, comedian and actor David Walliams, actor Leo Gregory, and footballer Michael Gray.

=== Health ===
Kensit has been candid and open about her struggles with her mental health, previous addictions, depression and anxiety in order to raise awareness and to support others. In 2024, she was diagnosed with post traumatic stress disorder, which she attributed to her father being absent for most of her life whilst he was in prison, and her mother's breast cancer diagnosis when Kensit was 6 and that she was in fear for most of her childhood that her mother would die; she later stated that she said "goodbye" to her mother "at least a dozen times" before her death when Kensit was 22, as well as other traumas and failed relationships.

=== Religion ===
Kensit is a Roman Catholic, although she identifies as an à la carte member of the faith. Kensit had her children baptised and confirmed in the Catholic tradition. She began attending church after her mother's death.

=== Business ventures ===
In 2015, Kensit launched her own beauty, skincare and cosmetics line called Preciously Perfect by Patsy Kensit.

== Acting credits ==
=== Film ===
| Year | Title | Role | Notes |
|---|---|---|---|
| 1972 | For the Love of Ada | Little girl | Uncredited |
| 1974 | The Great Gatsby | Pamela Buchanan | |
| 1974 | Gold | Little Girl at Christmas Party | Uncredited |
| 1975 | Alfie Darling | Penny | |
| 1975 | Hennessy | Angie Hennessy | |
| 1976 | The Blue Bird | Mytyl | |
| 1979 | Lady Oscar | Oscar as a child | |
| 1979 | Hanover Street | Sarah Sellinger | Nominated – Young Artist Award for Best Juvenile Actress in a Motion Picture |
| 1979 | Quincy's Quest | Jennifer | |
| 1985 | The Corsican Brothers | Emilie du Cailland | |
| 1986 | Absolute Beginners | Suzette | |
| 1988 | Don Bosco | Lina | |
| 1988 | A Chorus of Disapproval | Linda Washbrook | |
| 1989 | Lethal Weapon 2 | Rika van den Haas | |
| 1990 | Chicago Joe and the Showgirl | Joyce Cook | |
| 1990 | Kill Cruise | Su | |
| 1990 | Bullseye! | Sick Lady on Train | Cameo |
| 1991 | Blue Tornado | Isabella | |
| 1991 | Timebomb | Dr. Anna Nolmar | |
| 1991 | Twenty-One | Katie | Nominated – Independent Spirit Award for Best Female Lead |
| 1991 | Prince of Shadows | Rebeca | |
| 1992 | Blame It on the Bellboy | Caroline Wright | |
| 1992 | The Turn of the Screw | Jenny | |
| 1993 | Bitter Harvest | Jolene | |
| 1993 | Full Eclipse | Casey Spencer | |
| 1994 | Fall from Grace | Lady Deirdre Sebright | |
| 1995 | Kleptomania | Julie | |
| 1995 | Angels and Insects | Eugenia Alabaster Adamson | |
| 1995 | Love and Betrayal: The Mia Farrow Story | Mia Farrow | |
| 1995 | Dream Man | Kris Anderson | |
| 1995 | At the Midnight Hour | Elizabeth Guinness | |
| 1995 | Tunnel Vision | Kelly Wheatstone | |
| 1996 | Grace of My Heart | Cheryl Steed | |
| 1998 | Human Bomb | Marcia Weller | |
| 1999 | Speedway Junky | Donna | |
| 1999 | Janice Beard 45 WPM | Julia | |
| 2000 | The Pavilion | Clara Huddlestone | |
| 2000 | Best | Angie Best | |
| 2001 | Things Behind the Sun | Denise | |
| 2001 | Bad Karma | Maureen Hatcher | |
| 2001 | Loves Music, Loves to Dance | Darcy Scott | |
| 2002 | The One and Only | Stella | |
| 2002 | Who's Your Daddy? | Heather McKay | |
| 2003 | Darkness Falling | Vicki | |
| 2003 | Shelter Island | Alex Delamere | |
| 2006 | Played | Cindy | |
| 2007 | The Magic Door | Rachel | |
| 2021 | The Pebble and the Boy | Sonia | |
| 2022 | Renegades | Judy Carver | |
| 2024 | A Gangster's Kiss | Crassus | |
| 2025 | Borley Rectory: The Awakening | Constance Bull | |
| 2025 | A Scottish Christmas Secret | Sophie Bennett | |
| 2026 | Jackie the Stripper | Carlita | |
| TBA | Highly Inflammable | Edie | |

=== Television ===
| Year | Title | Role | Notes |
|---|---|---|---|
| 1972 | Birds Eye's Frozen Peas | Herself | Television advert |
| 1973 | The Brothers | Toddler | Episode: "Negotiations" |
| 1974 | Z-Cars | Joanna Page | Episode: "Joanna" |
| 1975 | A Man in the Zoo | Child | Television film |
| 1975 | Churchill's People | Brewster child | Episode: "America! America!" |
| 1976 | Dickens of London | Georgina Hogarth | 2 episodes |
| 1977–1978 | The Foundation | Emma Prince | 24 episodes |
| 1978 | Armchair Thriller | Tessa | 5 episodes (Quiet as a Nun) |
| 1979 | The Legend of King Arthur | Morgan le Fay | Episode: #1.1 |
| 1979 | Prince Regent | Young Princess Charlotte | 2 episodes |
| 1979 | Penmarric | Young Mariana | 2 episodes |
| 1980 | Hannah | Ruth Corder | All 4 episodes |
| 1980 | The Mystery of the Disappearing Schoolgirls | Daisy | Television film |
| 1981 | Great Expectations | Young Estella | 2 episodes |
| 1982 | Disneyland | Pollyanna | Episode: "The Adventures of Pollyanna" |
| 1982 | Flesh and Blood | Gwen Brassington | Series 2: Episode 5 |
| 1982 | Frost in May | Nanda Gray | Episode: "Beyond the Glass" |
| 1982 | Schoolgirl Chums | Hilary | Television film |
| 1983 | The Tragedy of Richard III | Lady Margaret Plantagenet | Television film |
| 1983 | Luna | Luna | 6 episodes |
| 1983 | Let There Be Love | Lucinda | Episode: "Love in Bloom" |
| 1984 | Diana | Young Diana | 2 episodes |
| 1984 | Jackanory Playhouse | Princess Rosanna | Episode: "The Prattling Princess" |
| 1985 | Silas Marner: The Weaver of Raveloe | Eppie | Television film |
| 1989 | Theatre Night | Louka | Episode: "Arms and the Man" |
| 1991 | Does This Mean We're Married? | Deena | Television film |
| 1992 | Screen One | Hetty Sorrel | Episode: "Adam Bede" |
| 1993 | Tales from the Crypt | Bridget | Episode: "As Ye Sow" |
| 1996 | French and Saunders | Patsy Kensit | 3 episodes |
| 1998 | The Last Don II | Josie Cirolia | Both episodes |
| 2000 | Aladdin | Princess Jasmine | Television film |
| 2001 | Strange Frequency | Kim | Episode: "Cold Turkey" |
| 2001 | Casualty | Charlotte Leith-Jones | Episode: "Happily Ever After" |
| 2002 | Murder in Mind | Angela Stephenson | Episode: "Flashback" |
| 2003–2004 | Bo' Selecta! | Patsy Kensit | 10 episodes |
| 2004 | Monkey Trousers | Various characters | Television film |
| 2004 | A Bear's Christmas Tail | Helen Hennerson | Television film |
| 2004–2006, 2026–present | Emmerdale | Sadie King | Regular role; Nominated – British Soap Award for Soap Bitch of the Year; Nominated – National Television Award for Most Popular Newcomer |
| 2005 | A Bear's Tail | Helen Hennerson | All 6 episodes |
| 2006 | Children's Party at the Palace | Various | Television film |
| 2007 | A Bucket o' French & Saunders | Various characters | 2 episodes |
| 2007–2010, 2019 | Holby City | Faye Morton | Regular role; 169 episodes |
| 2012–2013 | Lemon La Vida Loca | Patsy Kensit | 2 episodes |
| 2017 | Tina and Bobby | Betty Dean | 2 episodes |
| 2020 | Agatha Raisin | Emma Comfrey | Episode: "The Deadly Dance" |
| 2021 | McDonald & Dodds | Barbara Graham | Episode: "The Man Who Wasn't There" |
| 2023 | EastEnders | Emma Harding | Recurring role |
| 2023 | Death in Paradise | Bella Stableforth | Episode: "It's Behind You" |

=== Stage ===
| Year | Title | Role | Venue |
|---|---|---|---|
| 1983 | The Tragedy of Richard III | Lady Margaret Plantagenet | Royal Shakespeare Theatre, Stratford-upon-Avon, UK |
| 2003–2004 | See You Next Tuesday | Marlene | London Theatre Tour then West End, London |

==== Pantomime ====
| Year | Title | Role | Venue |
|---|---|---|---|
| 1982–1983 | Cinderella | Cinderella | Richmond Theatre, London, UK |
| 2000–2001 | Aladdin | Princess Jasmine | New Wimbledon Theatre, London, UK |
| 2005–2006 | Aladdin | The Genie of the Lamp | Richmond Theatre, London, UK |
| 2011–2012 | Snow White and the Seven Dwarfs | The Wicked Queen | Churchill Theatre, London, UK |
| 2022 | Aladdin | The Genie of the Lamp | Atkinson Theatre, Southport, UK |

=== Radio ===
| Year | Title | Role | Notes |
|---|---|---|---|
| 1995 | The Saint | Loretta Page | Episode: "Saint Overboard"; for BBC Radio 4 |
| 2015 | Drama on 4 | The Virgin Mother | Episode: "The Man Who Bit Mary Magdalene"; for BBC Radio 4 |
| 2018 | Doctor Who: The Monthly Adventures | The Scorpion | Episode: "Kingdom of Lies"; for Big Finish Productions |

=== Music videos ===
| Year | Title | Artist |
|---|---|---|
| 1982 | "Nobody's Fool" | Haircut One Hundred |
| 1985 | "Stay with Me" | Eighth Wonder |
| 1986 | "Will You Remember?" | Eighth Wonder |
| 1986 | "Having It All" | Eighth Wonder |
| 1987 | "La luce buona delle stelle" | Eros Ramazzotti |
| 1987 | "When the Phone Stops Ringing" | Eighth Wonder |
| 1988 | "I'm Not Scared" | Eighth Wonder |
| 1988 | "Cross My Heart" | Eighth Wonder |
| 1988 | "Baby Baby" | Eighth Wonder |
| 1995 | "Kelly's Heroes" | Black Grape |
| 2004 | "I Got You Babe / Soda Pop" | Bo' Selecta! |

== Awards and nominations ==
| Year | Organisation | Award | Nominated work | Result | Ref. |
|---|---|---|---|---|---|
| 1980 | Young Artist Awards | Young Artist Award for Best Juvenile Actress in a Motion Picture | Hanover Street | Nominated | |
| 1992 | Independent Spirit Awards | Independent Spirit Award for Best Female Lead | Twenty-One | Nominated | |
| 2004 | National Television Awards | Most Popular Newcomer | Emmerdale | Nominated | |
| 2005 | The British Soap Awards | Soap Bitch of the Year | Emmerdale | Nominated | |
| 2005 | Glamour | UK TV Actress of the Year | N/A | Won | |
| 2006 | The British Soap Awards | Soap Bitch of the Year | Emmerdale | Nominated | |
| 2007 | TV Quick | Best Actress | Holby City | Nominated | |
| 2023 | National Film Awards UK | Best Supporting Actress | Renegades | Nominated | |

== Bibliography ==
- Kensit, Patsy (2013). Absolute Beginner: The Autobiography. Sidgwick & Jackson. ISBN 978-0283071911.

== See also ==
- List of Celebrity Big Brother (British TV series) housemates
- List of Strictly Come Dancing contestants
