= Lindsay Merrithew =

Canadian actor and entrepreneur (born 1964)

- Born: 1964 (age 61–62); Woodstock, New Brunswick, Canada
- Education: Dalhousie University (BA); Juilliard School
- Occupations: Actor, Business Executive, Entrepreneur

Lindsay Merrithew (born 1964) is a Canadian entrepreneur, actor, and business executive. He is the President and chief executive officer of Merrithew International, Inc., a company he co-founded along with his wife Moira Stott Merrithew in 1987. He has produced hundreds of training and instructional videos for the company on the Stotts Pilates and other exercise techniques and brands.

As a film actor, he has appeared in Business Ethics (2019), Claws of the Red Dragon (2019) and Body Parts. As a television actor he appeared in Forever Knight, Suits, Nikita and other shows.

== Early life and education ==
Merrithew received his bachelor's degree in commerce from Dalhousie University in Nova Scotia, Canada. He then studied acting at the Juilliard School in New York City.

== Acting career ==
Merrithew has performed at the Shaw Festival in Niagara-on-the-Lake, Ontario. He appeared in the TV movie Perry Mason Returns (1985) and an episode of Alfred Hitchcock Presents (1988). In 1993, he played a lead role in the television miniseries Family Pictures. He has also appeared in the films Business Ethics (2019), Claws of the Red Dragon (2019) and Body Parts, and in the television shows Forever Knight, Suits, Nikita.

He continues to produce and perform in plays in Toronto, Ontario, theatres.

== Business career ==
Lindsay and Moira opened a Pilates studio in their Toronto apartment in 1988, teaching an alternative approach to Pilates. Finding it difficult to buy the kind of equipment they needed for their exercises, they designed their own. They named their company Stott Pilates. By 1996, along with the classes and continued development of new techniques, Stott Pilates expanded to consist of manufacturing, educational, and video and audio production divisions. Merrithew became president and CEO, with Moira serving as executive director of education. Beginning in 1997, Merrithew began producing training videos and teaching manuals incorporating physiotherapy and rehabilitation techniques. Merrithew has produced hundreds of videos and DVDs.

They renamed the company Merrithew International, Inc. in 2011. In 2022, private equity fund Onex Corporation purchased a majority stake in Merrithew International.

== Filmography ==
=== Film ===
Year	Title	Role	Notes
1991	Body Parts	Roger	
2019	Business Ethics	Mayor Snipe	
2019	Claws of the Red Dragon	Jameson Jones	
2021	Fenced Out	Derrick	short

=== Television ===
Year	Title	Role	Notes
1985	In Like Flynn	Young Man	TV Movie
1985	Perry Mason Returns	Chris	TV Movie
1988	Alfred Hitchcock Presents	Steve	1 episode
1990	Hitler's Daughter		TV Movie
1990	Murder Times Seven	Jerry	TV Movie
1991	Drop Dead Gorgeous	Bruce Kneppler	TV Movie
1991	Beyond Reality	Eric	1 episode
1992	Forever Knight	Richard Lambert	1 episode
1992	Catwalk	Mr. Stevens	1 episode
1990–1992	Rin Tin Tin: K-9 Cop	David Butler	3 episodes
1993	Tropical Heat	Mark Richards	1 episode
1993	Family Pictures	Will Price	TV Miniseries; Winner, Best Miniseries, American Television Awards; Emmy nominee for Writing and Outstanding Miniseries; Golden Globe Nominee; Best Actress in a Miniseries (Anjelica Huston)
1993	Kung Fu: The Legend Continues	Paul	1 episode
1993	The Hidden Room	Bill	1 episode
1995	At the Midnight Hour	Blain Keaton	TV Movie
1996	Due South	John Robinson	1 episode
1997	PSI Factor: Chronicles of the Paranormal	Jim Burns	1 episode
1997	Traders	Victor Kennilworth	3 episodes
1999	The City	Tommy Wainwright	2 episodes
2004	Wild Card		1 episode
2005	Sue Thomas: F.B.Eye	Jeffrey Ashton	1 episode
2013	Nikita	Oil Baron	1 episode
2015	The Secret Life of Marilyn Monroe	Beverly Hills Physician	TV Miniseries; 1 episode
2015	Suits	David Polk	1 episode
2018	Wynonna Earp	Otto	1 episode
2021	Murdoch Mysteries	Montreal Cop	1 episode
2022	My Grown-Up Christmas List	Charlie Malone	TV Movie
2023	Accused	Judge Vogel	1 episode
2024	The Last Frontier	USM Riggs	1 episode
2024	The Love Club	Clark	1 episode
2025	It: Welcome to Derry	Councilman Tibbs	1 episode
