= Fearless (Eighth Wonder album) =

Studio album by Eighth Wonder
- Released: 22 June 1988
- Recorded: 1985–1988
- Studios: PWL Studios, London; Swanyard Studios, London; The Workhouse Studios, London
- Genre: Pop
- Length: 39:16 (original release); 71:52 (2010 reissue)
- Labels: CBS (1988); Cherry Red Records (2010)
- Producers: Richard James Burgess; Mike Chapman; Pete Hammond; Phil Harding; Pet Shop Boys; Alan Shacklock

Singles from Fearless
- 1. "Stay with Me" Released: October 1985; 2. "Will You Remember?" Released: February 1987; 3. "When the Phone Stops Ringing" Released: 5 October 1987; 4. "I'm Not Scared" Released: February 1988; 5. "Cross My Heart" Released: June 1988; 6. "Baby Baby" Released: 19 September 1988; 7. "Use Me (Japan only)" Released: 1989

Professional ratings
Review scores
| Source | Rating |
|---|---|
| AllMusic | 2/5 stars |
| NME | 1/10 |
| Number One | 1/5 stars |
| Smash Hits | 4/10 |

Fearless is the debut studio album by the English pop group Eighth Wonder, released first in Japan on 22 June 1988 and then in the UK on 11 July 1988 by CBS Records International. It is the group's only UK album release, the original version containing five UK-issued singles including their highest-selling track, the Pet Shop Boys-produced and written "I'm Not Scared", which reached No. 7 in the UK singles chart. The follow-up single, "Cross My Heart", peaked at No. 13 in the UK. The group's debut single, "Stay with Me", dating back to 1985, has been included on Fearless reissues from 1997 onwards. The album peaked at No. 47 on the UK Albums Chart.

Fearless is dedicated to James Henry Kensit, the father of band members Patsy and Jamie Kensit. Eighth Wonder split up in 1989, with lead singer Patsy going on to devote herself to her acting career.

The album was reissued in the UK by Cherry Red Records in January 2010, with the addition of five bonus tracks.

== Track listing ==
| No. | Title | Writer(s) | Producer(s) | Length |
|---|---|---|---|---|
| 1. | "Cross My Heart" | Michael Jay | Pete Hammond | 3:27 |
| 2. | "When the Phone Stops Ringing" | Holly Knight; Bernie Taupin | Mike Chapman | 3:48 |
| 3. | "Baby Baby" | Sam Dominges; John Forte | Hammond | 4:00 |
| 4. | "Will You Remember?" | Chris McDaniels; London McDaniels; Phil Roy | Chapman | 4:31 |
| 5. | "Wild Love" | David Paul Bryant; Franne Golde | Hammond | 3:55 |
| 6. | "I'm Not Scared" | Neil Tennant; Chris Lowe | Phil Harding; Pet Shop Boys | 4:30 |
| 7. | "Use Me" | Billy Steinberg; Tom Kelly | Richard James Burgess | 3:34 |
| 8. | "Anything At All" | Marc Tanner; Esther Terry | Burgess | 3:57 |
| 9. | "My Baby's Heartbeat" | Steinberg; Kelly | Burgess | 3:43 |
| 10. | "The Dress" | James House; Debrah Neal | Burgess | 3:51 |
| Total length: | | | | 39:16 |

1997 reissue bonus track

| No. | Title | Writer(s) | Producer(s) | Length |
|---|---|---|---|---|
| 11. | "Stay with Me" | Geoff Beauchamp; Patsy Kensit | Alan Shacklock | 3:16 |

2010 reissue bonus tracks

| No. | Title | Writer(s) | Length |
|---|---|---|---|
| 12. | "Cross My Heart" (Dance mix) | Jay | 7:08 |
| 13. | "Let Me In" | Beauchamp; Alexander Richard Godson; Kensit | 4:36 |
| 14. | "Baby Baby" (Dance mix) | Domingo; Forte | 7:01 |
| 15. | "I'm Not Scared" (Disco mix) | Tennant; Lowe | 7:45 |
| 16. | "J'Ai Pas Peur" (French version of "I'm Not Scared") | Tennant; Lowe | 5:51 |

== Singles ==
UK Singles Chart positions

- 1985: "Stay with Me" (No. 65)
- 1987: "Will You Remember?" (No. 83)
- 1987: "When the Phone Stops Ringing" (No.106)
- 1988: "I'm Not Scared" (No. 7)
- 1988: "Cross My Heart" (No. 13)
- 1988: "Baby Baby" (No. 65)
- 1989: "Use Me" (–)

== Personnel ==
Eighth Wonder

- Patsy Kensit – vocals
- Geoff Beauchamp – lead and acoustic guitar, drum programming
- Steve Grantley – drums, drum programming
- Jamie Kensit – rhythm guitar, additional keyboards

Additional personnel

- Alex Godson – keyboards, keyboard programming
- Graham Edwards – additional bass
- Mike Collins – programming (tracks 7–10; uncredited)

== Sales and certifications ==
Certifications for Fearless
| Region | Certification | Certified units/sales |
|---|---|---|
| Spain (Promusicae) | Platinum | 100,000^{^} |
^{^} Shipments figures based on certification alone.
