= Alicia Scott =

Alicia Scott may refer to:

- Alicia Ann Spottiswoode or Alicia Ann, Lady John Scott, Scottish songwriter
- Alicia Scott, pseudonym of American author Lisa Gardner
