= Loves Music, Loves to Dance =

1991 novel by Mary Higgins Clark

- First edition (publ. Simon & Schuster)
- Author: Mary Higgins Clark
- Publisher: Simon & Schuster
- Publication date: May 6, 1991
- ISBN: 0-671-67364-5

Loves Music, Loves to Dance is a 1991 novel by American author Mary Higgins Clark. It was one of Publishers Weekly's top 10 bestselling novels of 1991.

Loves Music, Loves to Dance was adapted into a TV movie which premiered on Pax TV (now Ion) in 2001. It stars Patsy Kensit, Cynthia Preston, Dean McDermott and Louis Ferreira.
