= I'm Not Scared (song) =

1988 single by Eighth Wonder

Single by Eighth Wonder

from the album Fearless
- B-side: "J'ai pas peur"
- Released: 8 February 1988
- Studio: PWL (London)
- Genre: Synth-pop; dance-pop; Europop
- Length: 4:30 (album); 3:49 (single); 7:58 (disco mix)
- Label: CBS
- Songwriters: Neil Tennant; Chris Lowe
- Producers: Phil Harding; Neil Tennant; Chris Lowe

Eighth Wonder singles chronology
"When the Phone Stops Ringing" (1987)	"I'm Not Scared" (1988)	"Cross My Heart" (1988)

Music video
- "I'm Not Scared" on YouTube

"I'm Not Scared" is a song by British pop band Eighth Wonder, released in February 1988 by CBS Records International as the first single from their debut album, Fearless (1988). The song achieved success in Europe, peaking at number seven on the UK Singles Chart, reaching number one in Italy, and entering the top five in Finland, Luxembourg, Spain, Switzerland and West Germany. It also charted in Israel and Japan.

Written by the Pet Shop Boys, the original version of "I'm Not Scared" contains several words in French. "J'ai pas peur" is the French adaptation of "I'm Not Scared" and is included as the B-side to the 7-inch and 12-inch singles. The 12-inch "disco mix" combines the two versions into one long mix. Pet Shop Boys also released their own version of the song, with Neil Tennant vocals, on the album Introspective.

== Critical reception ==
In his review of the song, John Wilde from Melody Maker wrote, "It is entirely meaningless and is exactly what you expect it to be. This doesn't stop it roving through an empty space with a fair amount of scarlet charm." Another Melody Maker editor, Chris Roberts, complimented the single as "fine". Jerry Smith of Music Week considered that it was not surprising that "I'm not Scared" sounds like Pet Shop Boys and Phil Harding production, as the song was written and produced by them, noted "Kensit's distinctive, breathy vocal" and deemed the song a potential hit. James Hamilton from Record Mirror wrote in his dance column, "Patsy Kensit-lisped and French-spoken lethargic Eurobeat-ish ultimately quite haunting 0-105 5/6-0bpm slinker produced by the Pet Shop Boys and Phil Harding".

William Shaw from Smash Hits felt the song "definitely bears all the hallmarks of Eurodisco — all the little insistent keyboard tunes, all the thumping bass bits, all the chattering drum machines. But where most Eurodisco records tend to be lyrically a bit daff and musically lightweight, this is a work of genius. An extremely girlie sounding Patsy Kensit strides through a city full of dogs singing a beautifully mournful melody about how she's not afraid of them, first in English, and then (just to add a touch of Euro-flavour) in French. Strange indeed, but mighty compelling."

== Retrospective response ==
Slant Magazine ranked the song at number 62 on its "100 Greatest Dance Songs" list in 2006, writing, "'I'm Not Scared' is unmistakably a Lowe/Tennant composition, with sharp staccato synth lines, a fluctuating bassline, histrionic lyrics ending in curly, figurative question marks [...], and – on the extended Disco Version – dramatic string stabs".

== Track listings ==
- 7-inch single and cassette single
1. "I'm Not Scared" – 3:49
2. "J'ai pas peur" – 5:48
- 10-inch single
1. "I'm Not Scared" (10-inch remix) – 5:30
2. "J'ai pas peur" – 5:48
- UK 12-inch and CD single; European mini-CD single
1. "I'm Not Scared" (disco mix) – 7:58
2. "I'm Not Scared" – 4:30 (album version)
3. "J'ai pas peur" – 5:48
- US 12-inch single

A1. "I'm Not Scared" (long Euro mix) / (disco mix) – 7:58
A2. "J'ai pas peur" – 5:48
B1. "I'm Not Scared" (Little Louie Vega mix) – 7:17
B2. "Baby Baby" (Dusted mix) – 6:00

- Japanese mini-CD single
1. "I'm Not Scared" (disco mix) – 8:00
2. "J'ai pas peur" – 5:51

== Credits ==
Original version

- Artwork by Stylorouge
- Photography by Eamon J. McCabe
- Produced by Pet Shop Boys and Phil Harding
- Programmed by Ian Curnow
- Written by Tennant and Lowe

Little Louie Vega mix & Dub version

- Edited by Tony Moran
- Assistant: Chris Trevett
- Recording by Mike Rogers
- Remixed by Hugo Dwyer
- Keyboards by Mac Quayle
- Produced by "Little" Louie Vega

== Charts ==
=== Weekly charts ===
Weekly chart performance for "I'm Not Scared"
Chart (1988)	Peak position
Austria (Ö3 Austria Top 40)	20
Belgium (Ultratop 50 Flanders)	16
Denmark (Hitlisten)	18
Europe (Eurochart Hot 100 Singles)	12
Finland (Suomen virallinen lista)	4
France (SNEP)	8
Ireland (IRMA)	14
Israel (Israeli Singles Chart)	4
Italy (Musica e dischi)	1
Japan (Oricon)	100
Luxembourg (Radio Luxembourg)	5
Netherlands (Dutch Top 40 Tipparade)	4
Netherlands (Single Top 100)	27
Spain (AFYVE)	2
Sweden (Trackslistan)	10
Switzerland (Schweizer Hitparade)	2
UK Singles (Official Charts)	7
UK Dance (Music Week)	7
West Germany (GfK)	5

=== Year-end charts ===
Year-end chart performance for "I'm Not Scared"
Chart (1988)	Position
Switzerland (Schweizer Hitparade)	7
UK Singles (Gallup)	80
West Germany (Media Control)	51

== Cover versions ==
- The Pet Shop Boys included their own version of the song on their 1988 album Introspective.
- Swedish Pet Shop Boys tribute group West End Girls covered the song for their 2006 debut album Goes Petshopping.
