= Road Raja =

- Genre: Reality Game show
- Presented by: Javed Jaffrey
- Country of origin: United Kingdom
- Original language: English
- No. of series: 1
- No. of episodes: 6

Production
- Running time: 60 minutes (inc. adverts)
- Production company: TWI

Original release
- Network: Sky One
- Release: 29 August – 3 October 2004

Road Raja is a reality television game show that aired on Sky One from 29 August to 3 October 2004. Set in Mumbai, the series followed six celebrities as they completed a number of driving tasks in and around the city, culminating in the Road Raja Grand Prix - a mad dash around the city.

== The Celebrities ==
- Julie Goodyear
- Keith Allen
- Caprice Bourret
- Dennis Waterman
- Tania Strecker
- Russell Amerasekera

Note: Keith Allen left during the third episode due to a family emergency and therefore did not complete the rest of the series or compete in the Grand Prix.

== Presenter ==
The series was hosted by comedian, actor, dancer and Bollywood film star Javed Jaffrey.

== Music ==
The theme tune was composed and performed by Keith Allen. The show also features various examples of Indian music, in conjunction with its setting.

== The Race ==
In the final episode the celebs competed in the Road Raja Grand Prix - where they had to complete a tour of Mumbai over 5 stages. At the end of each stage was an iconic landmark and the celebs had to have their picture taken by a member of the public to prove they had reached the destination.

The final order of the race was:

- 1st - Caprice Bourret
- 2nd - Tania Strecker
- 3rd - Dennis Waterman
- 4th - Russell Amerasekera

Note: Julie Goodyear did not finish the race because of a crash - she did not suffer any injuries and was not driving the car at the time - her navigator was. A common theme throughout the series was Julie's ability to get others - usually locals - to drive her vehicles for her. After the race she was also disqualified.
