= Eighth Wonder (band) =

British pop band

- Origin: London, England
- Genres: Pop; dance-pop
- Years active: 1983–1989
- Label: Sony Music
- Past members: Patsy Kensit; David Bone; Jamie Kensit; Steve Grantley; Geoff Beauchamp; Jake Walters; Lawrence Lewis

Eighth Wonder were an English pop band, formed in 1983 in London. Initially composed of singer/model/actress Patsy Kensit, her brother Jamie Kensit, Steve Grantley, Geoff Beauchamp, Nigel Davis, Jake Walters and Lawrence Lewis, at the peak of their success they were a four-piece of the Kensits, Grantley and Beauchamp. The band first enjoyed major success in Japan and Italy in 1985–87, before finally breaking through in the UK and across Europe in 1988, thanks to their hit single "I'm Not Scared", which made the Top 10 in the UK. They scored another UK Top 20 hit with "Cross My Heart" before breaking up in 1989, with Patsy Kensit continuing her successful acting career.

== Biography ==
=== Early years ===
Eighth Wonder's roots are with a band called Spice. In 1983, Jamie Kensit auditioned his sister Patsy Kensit, then aged 15, for the vacant job of lead singer in his new band. The line-up consisted of her on vocals, Jamie Kensit and Geoff Beauchamp on guitar, Lawrence Lewis on bass, Jake Walters on drums and Nigel Davis on percussion. Spice made their live debut in autumn 1983, and then spent the next year playing further gigs, hoping to gain some attention from record labels.

In late 1984, Davis left to start the band Slipstream, and keyboard-player Alex Godson joined the remaining members. They renamed themselves Eighth Wonder and Patsy Kensit began to write songs for the band. Their first gig as Eighth Wonder was in November 1984 in Wimbledon, London and further gigs followed, including at Queen Elizabeth College in Kensington. It was at one of these that Stephen Woolley, co-owner of Palace Films, and director Julien Temple offered Patsy Kensit the role of Crepe Suzette in their 1986 movie musical Absolute Beginners. Eighth Wonder contributed a song to the soundtrack.

=== Success in Japan and Italy ===
In April 1985, Eighth Wonder was signed by CBS Records and began recording in London, working around Patsy Kensit's filming on Absolute Beginners. In October 1985, with the filming completed, Eighth Wonder's first single "Stay With Me" was released and achieved success in Japan, where it reached No. 1 and Italy, where it peaked at No. 4 in early 1986. It charted only at No. 65 in the UK singles chart. Shortly after, Lewis and Walters left. The band then started using drum machine and using keyboards for their bass sound.

In August 1986, they went to Los Angeles to record new tracks for their debut album, Fearless. There they worked with producer Mike Chapman, best known for his work with Blondie. They were also approached by many songwriters, including Dave Stewart of Eurythmics (although the song was eventually not used) and Billy Steinberg and Tom Kelly, writers of many hit singles including Cyndi Lauper's "True Colors", Whitney Houston's "So Emotional" and Madonna's "Like a Virgin".

In February 1987, one of the Chapman-produced tracks, "Will You Remember", was released in the United Kingdom but only reached No. 83 - though it reached the Top 10 in Italy, after a memorable performance at the Sanremo Music Festival, when a wardrobe malfunction caused Patsy to expose one of her nipples, live on TV. In Japan, the band achieved another No. 1 hit with another Chapman production, "When The Phone Stops Ringing", which was written by Holly Knight and Bernie Taupin. The song was also a Top 30 hit in Italy. "Will You Remember" was successfully released as a follow-up single in Japan. This was in turn followed by Brilliant Dreams, a Japanese exclusive mini album containing the singles and b-sides.

=== Success in the UK ===
Whilst completing their first album, the band had another line-up change, with Godson being replaced by drummer Steve Grantley. They worked with sound engineer, mixer and producer Pete Hammond, with the exception of one track, "I'm Not Scared", co-produced and written by Pet Shop Boys and Phil Harding. Chosen as the next single for release in Europe, it was greeted with media and public enthusiasm. "I'm Not Scared" became a Top 10 hit in almost every country in Europe, achieving No. 1 in Italy, No. 2 in Switzerland and Portugal, No. 3 in Spain, No. 4 in Greece, No. 5 in Germany, No. 7 in the UK, No. 8 in France and No. 20 in Austria. Pet Shop Boys recorded their own version of the song for their album Introspective.

May 1988 saw the release of another single, "Cross My Heart", which proved to be almost as successful chart-wise as "I'm Not Scared" (No. 6 in Switzerland, No. 10 in Italy, No. 13 in UK, and France, and No. 56 in the US - where it was their only Top 75 single).

Eighth Wonder's album Fearless followed in July 1988, and by October it had achieved almost 500,000 sales internationally.

The follow-up single "Baby Baby" only got to No. 65 in the UK singles chart and would be their last hit in Italy, peaking at No. 13. They had one more hit in Japan with "Use Me" in 1989 and, shortly after this, the band parted ways and Kensit began to focus on her marriage and acting career. In 1988, Hong Kong singer Elvina Kong covered "Baby Baby" in Cantonese.

== Discography ==
=== Albums ===
==== Studio albums ====
Title	Album details	Peak chart positions								Sales
Title	Album details	UK	FIN	GER	IT	JPN	SPA	SWE	SWI	Sales
Brilliant Dreams	Released: 21 January 1987; Label: Epic; Formats: CD, LP, MC; Japan-only release	—	—	—	—	11	—	—	—	JPN: 93,880
Fearless	Released: April 1988; Label: CBS, Epic; Formats: CD, LP, MC	47	15	31	7	7	14	40	19	JPN: 82,580
"—" denotes releases that did not chart or were not released in that territory.

==== Compilation albums ====
Title	Album details
The Best Remixes	Released: 1 December 1989; Label: Epic; Formats: CD Japan-only release
The Remix Anthology	Released: 21 July 2014; Label: Cherry Pop, Solid; Formats: CD

=== Singles ===
Title	Year	Peak chart positions										Sales	Album
Title	Year	UK	AUS	FIN	FRA	GER	IT	JPN	SPA	SWI	US	Sales	Album
"Stay with Me"	1985	65	—	—	—	—	4	30	—	—	—	JPN: 81,940	Brilliant Dreams
"Having It All" (Japan-only release)	1986	—	—	—	—	—	—	88	—	—	—	JPN: 1,510	Brilliant Dreams
"When the Phone Stops Ringing"	1987	106	—	—	—	—	17	24	—	—	—	JPN: 24,670	Brilliant Dreams / Fearless
"Will You Remember"	1987	83	—	—	—	—	9	—	—	—	—		Brilliant Dreams / Fearless
"I'm Not Scared"	1988	7	—	4	8	5	1	100	2	2	—	JPN: 1,420	Fearless
"Cross My Heart"	1988	13	116	3	13	17	10	—	2	6	56		Fearless
"Baby Baby"	1988	65	113	20	—	—	7	—	10	—	84		Fearless
"Use Me" (Japan-only release)	1989	—	—	—	—	—	—	—	—	—	—		Fearless
"—" denotes releases that did not chart or were not released in that territory.
