= At the Midnight Hour =

1995 television film directed by Charles Jarrott

- Directed by: Charles Jarrott
- Screenplay by: Joe Wiesenfeld
- Based on: Novel by Alicia Scott
- Produced by: Norman Denver
- Starring: Patsy Kensit; Simon MacCorkindale; Lindsay Merrithew
- Cinematography: Robert Fresco
- Edited by: Bruce Lange
- Music by: Charles T. Cozens
- Production company: Harlequin Films
- Distributed by: CTV Television Network
- Release date: October 29, 1995
- Running time: 91 minutes / 120 minutes
- Countries: Canada; Made on location in Ontario, Canada
- Language: English

At the Midnight Hour is a Canadian television film of 1995 directed by Charles Jarrott, starring Patsy Kensit, Simon MacCorkindale, and Lindsay Merrithew.

== Plot ==
Liz Guinness (Kensit) loses her husband when he is killed as a bystander at an armed robbery. Dr Richard Keaton (MacCorkindale), a rich scientist and widower, hires her as the nanny for his twelve-year-old son Andrew. On her arrival at a big remote country house, the cab driver tells her to call him in case of any trouble and wishes her "Good luck, you're gonna need it!" Guinness is let in by a sinister housekeeper (Hawtrey) using CCTV and later gathers that the late Alycia Keaton fell to her death, that this was put down as suicide but was suspected to have been murder, and also that previous nannies have not stayed long. Keaton gives Guinness minimal duties and tells her not to disturb him or his son. Keaton's brother Blain Keaton (Merrithew) arrives at the house with his girlfriend Jillian (Dale) and wants the property to be sold. Strange events then unfold.

== Cast ==
- Patsy Kensit as Elizabeth Guinness
- Simon MacCorkindale as Richard Keaton
- Keegan MacIntosh as Andrew Keaton
- Lindsay Merrithew as Blain Keaton
- Cynthia Dale as Jillian
- Kay Hawtrey as Mrs Pram, housekeeper
- Doug Lennox as Sheriff
- Shawn Lawrence as Cab driver
- Edward Jaunz as Nick Guinness
- Brad Austin as Groom
