= Blame It on the Bellboy =

1992 film by Mark Herman

- Theatrical release poster
- Directed by: Mark Herman
- Written by: Mark Herman
- Produced by: Steve Abbott; Jennifer Howarth
- Starring: Dudley Moore; Bryan Brown; Patsy Kensit; Richard Griffiths; Andreas Katsulas; Alison Steadman; Penelope Wilton; Bronson Pinchot
- Cinematography: Andrew Dunn
- Edited by: Michael Ellis
- Music by: Trevor Jones
- Production company: Hollywood Pictures
- Distributed by: Buena Vista Pictures Distribution (Worldwide); Warner Bros. (Select territories)
- Release dates: January 24, 1992 (UK); March 6, 1992 (US)
- Running time: 78 minutes
- Countries: United Kingdom; United States
- Language: English
- Budget: £5 million
- Box office: $3 million

Blame It on the Bellboy is a 1992 comedy film written and directed by Mark Herman and starring Dudley Moore, Bryan Brown, Patsy Kensit, Richard Griffiths, and Bronson Pinchot. The plot is about a case of mistaken identity of three individuals with similar-sounding surnames staying at the same hotel.

== Plot ==
Three men board the same plane at London Heathrow Airport, bound for Venice: Melvyn Orton, a shy and unassuming clerk assigned with purchasing a house in Venice under penalty of losing his job; Mike Lawton, a hitman en route to Venice to kill his next mark, and Lord Maurice Horton, a bank manager and the mayor in a small city in the United Kingdom who is there to meet a woman through a dating agency called Medi-Date.

All three register at the Hotel Gabrielli, where the Italian bellboy has a poor command of English and becomes totally confused with the names Orton, Horton, and Lawton. All three are expecting messages: Melvyn from a local real estate agency, Mike from the Mafia, and Maurice from his dating agency. However, the bellboy delivers all of them to the wrong man: Melvyn receives the details of Mike's 'hit' who is a local mob boss, Maurice gets the address of the villa, and Mike is given the message about Maurice's date.

Melvyn arrives at the house of Mr. Scarpa, a mafioso who knows he is being sought by a killer, so Melvyn is taken prisoner and tortured to reveal the name of his boss. At the villa, Maurice meets Caroline Wright, who is in on a scam and a big commission for her to sell the villa quickly and to get the money in cash, but he thinks she is his date and is pleasantly surprised when her sales talk gives him the impression that she is eager for sex. Mike follows Maurice's intended date, Patricia, but fails with his first attempt to kill her.

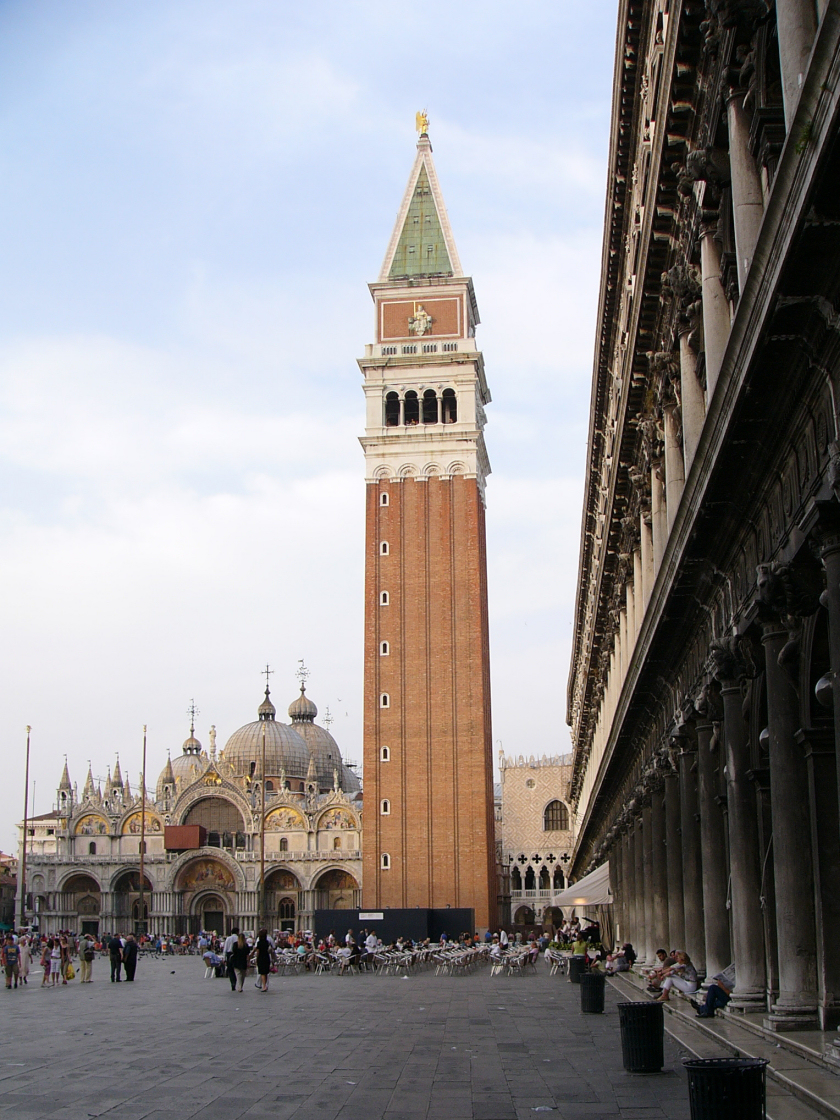
Piazza San Marco in Venice, with St Mark's Campanile in the background

Melvyn is allowed to call his boss in England to confirm his story, and Marshall thunders abuse at Melvyn and hangs up. Scarpa remarks that Melvyn is a worm to take such insults, but still thinks Melvyn and this "Mr. Marshall" want him dead. When they prepare to torture him, Melvyn remembers the man at his hotel with a similar last name: "Horton". Now suspecting Maurice as the assassin, Scarpa and his men head to the hotel, taking Melvyn with them. Maurice takes Caroline out for lunch. Patricia, believing Mike is her date and a bit shy, engages him in conversation.

Maurice has tried to make a move on Caroline, who makes him think she will only go along if he pays cash. Mike again prepares to kill Patricia, but again fails when disturbed. Melvyn makes a run for it, chased by Scarpa's men. Everyone returns to the hotel: Maurice and Caroline to have sex, Mike to figure out what to do with Patricia, and Melvyn to check out and run for his life.

Melvyn is trapped again by the mafiosi and taken to a room in the hotel. Mike and Patricia have clarified that she is not his mark and that Medi-Date is a legitimate company. Maurice, after having sex with Caroline, finds out she is not his date and tells her he does not want to buy the villa. Maurice's wife arrives at the hotel, and the bellboy takes her to the room where Melvyn is being tortured again, but they quickly leave. Caroline is in Maurice's bathroom when Mrs. Horton arrives, having become suspicious that Maurice is in Venice with another woman. Joining them, Caroline gives Maurice's wife the impression that he is there to buy a villa, signalling to Maurice that she will keep their tryst secret if he pays her price.

Maurice arranges for the money to be transferred to him from the UK, a conversation overheard by both Mike and the mafiosi. Mike and Patricia realize she was not the mark. Scarpa decides to kill both Horton and Orton.

Maurice receives the money, places it in a briefcase, and leaves it in the hotel safe. The mafiosi get an identical briefcase in which they hide a bomb, get Melvyn to deposit it in the hotel safe, and then break in and swap the identification tags on the two briefcases. Maurice takes out his briefcase and leaves for the villa with Mike and the mafiosi in pursuit. Mike and Patricia try to steal the briefcase, and a struggle ensues between them, the Hortons, and Caroline over the money. Melvyn, sitting in a raft offshore, is ordered to set off the bomb by an impatient Mr. Scarpa, whose boat is sitting further offshore, unable to get any closer. As Melvyn tries to comply, one of Scarpa's henchmen realizes he and another of Scarpa's men had both swapped the tags on the briefcases. Realizing the bomb is in the briefcase on his boat, Scarpa screams at his men to throw it overboard and begins firing at Melvyn with a pistol to stop him from setting off the bomb. But Melvyn assumes the Mafiosi are telling him to hurry up. The detonator finally works, and Scarpa's boat explodes and sinks.

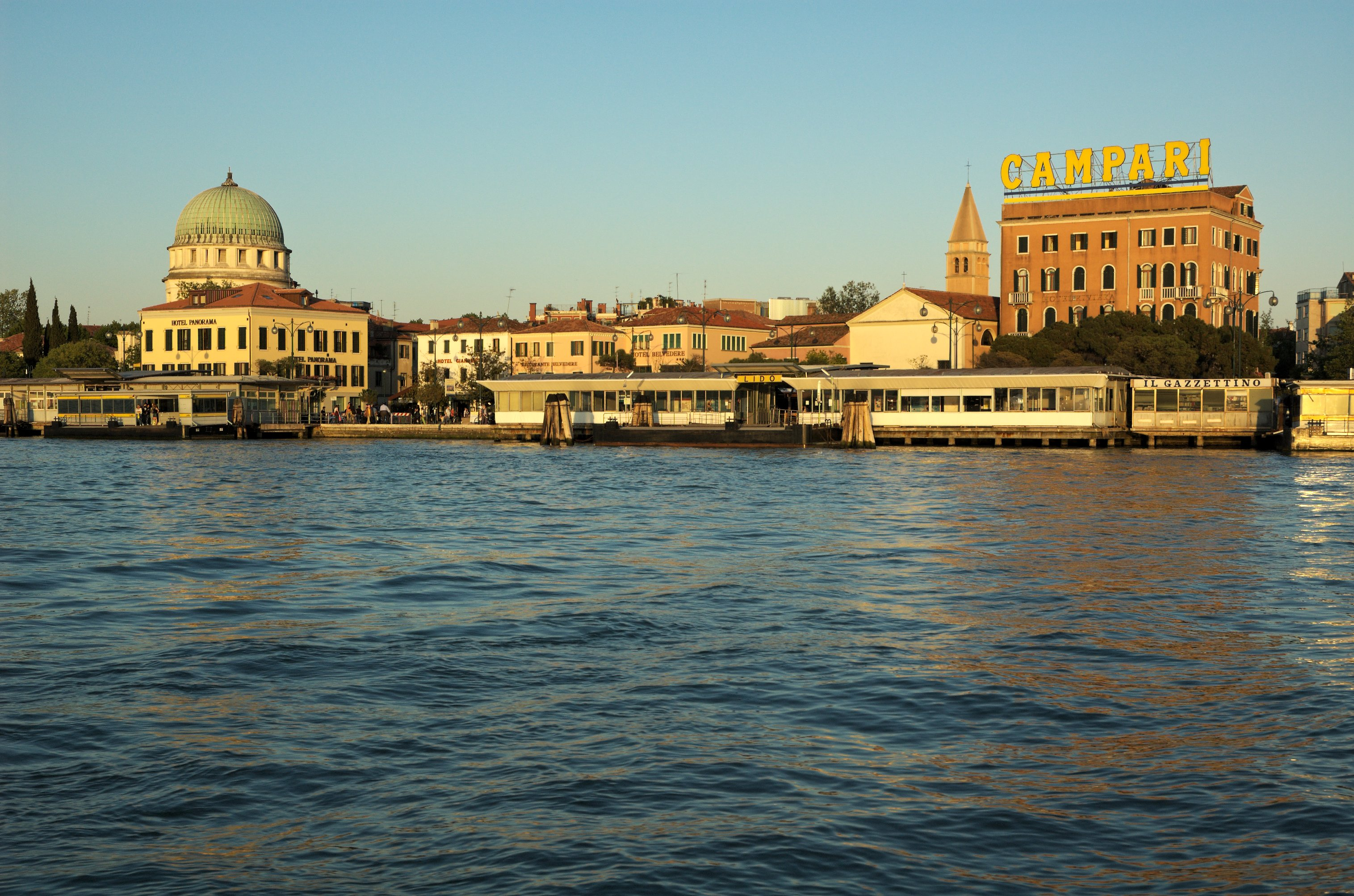
Lido Vaporetto terminal, seen from the Lagoon

Mike retreats to the Hotel Gabrielli in a panic. The organization he works for doesn't forgive mistakes, and given what has happened he now fears for his own life. When the bellboy knocks on the door, Mike holds him at gunpoint while Patricia reads the message from Mike's employer: given that his actual mark Scarpa and two of his top men were killed, he has been paid a generous bonus on top of his original fee.

Melvyn calls Mr. Marshall and tricks him out of £355,000.00, the price for Scarpa's house in Venice. Mr. Marshall arrives at the house sometime later, and Scarpa's men avenge their boss.

The epilogue states that Melvyn takes the money and runs for the Bahamas; Caroline gets a speedboat and marries a sumo wrestler; the Hortons' villa falls apart and so does their marriage; Mike and Patricia get married; and the bellboy eventually gets the sack.

== Cast ==
Actor	Character
Dudley Moore	Melvyn Orton
Bryan Brown	Mike Lawton (Charlton Black)
Richard Griffiths	Maurice Horton
Andreas Katsulas	Mr. Scarpa
Patsy Kensit	Caroline Wright
Alison Steadman	Rosemary Horton
Penelope Wilton	Patricia Fulford
Bronson Pinchot	Bellboy
Jim Carter	Rossi, a thug
Alex Norton	Alfio, another thug
John Grillo	Hotel Manager
Andrew Bailey	shady character
Ronnie Stevens	Man on plane
Enzo Turrin	Senior Policeman
Andy Bradford	Italian victim
Lindsay Anderson	Mr. Marshall (voice)

== Reception ==
The film received negative reviews from critics and holds a 19% rating on Rotten Tomatoes based on 16 reviews. Audiences polled by CinemaScore gave the film an average grade of "C+" on an A+ to F scale.

=== Box office ===
It opened in the United Kingdom on January 24, 1992, through Warner Bros., the then-European theatrical partner of Buena Vista Pictures. It grossed £956,220 for the week from 262 screens, placing it second at the box office, behind JFK, which opened in the same week. Elsewhere, the film was a box office flop.

== See also ==
- Once upon a Crime (1992 film)
