= A Scottish Christmas Secret =

- Directed by: Graham Pritz-Bennett
- Written by: JJ Moon
- Produced by: Caprice Bourret; Dave Hickey; Vanessa Shapiro
- Starring: Caprice Bourret; Alex Trumble; Patsy Kensit; Dom Watters; Gordon Joseph Millar; Julie Hannan
- Cinematography: Gavin White
- Edited by: Sean Cain; Laura Johnson
- Music by: Guy Dowsett
- Production company: JJLove Productions
- Release date: 1 November 2025
- Running time: 85 minutes
- Country: United Kingdom
- Language: English

A Scottish Christmas Secret is a 2025 Christmas romance film directed by Graham Pritz-Bennett and written by JJ Moon. It stars Caprice Bourret, Alex Trumble and Patsy Kensit and was released on 1 November 2025. Bourret also jointly produced the film.

== Premise ==
When book publisher Tiffany's (Caprice Bourret) bestselling author Nathan McAllister (Alex Trumble) decides to quit writing in order to become a ski instructor in Aviemore, a town in the Scottish Highlands, without finishing his successful book series, she hatches a plan with her sister Sophie (Patsy Kensit) to convince Nathan to complete the series. Tiffany travels up to Scotland and finds Nathan. Whilst posing as a ski student, Tiffany uncovers a startling secret as she and Nathan grow closer.

== Cast ==
- Caprice Bourret as Tiffany Bennett
- Alex Trumble as Nathan McAllister
- Patsy Kensit as Sophie Bennett
- Dom Watters as Lachlan Douglas
- Gordon Joseph Millar as Hamish Campbell
- Fiona Hannan as Fiona McAllister
- Jett Bourret Comfort as Logan
- Nekoda Garrett as Siobhan
- Jax Bourret Comfort as Ollie
- Stephen Corrall as Fergus McAllister
- Nick Lyon as Angus
- Sabean Bea as Bookkeeper

== Production ==
Filming took place in early 2025 in Aberfeldy and Pitlochry, as well as several locations in the Cairngorms National Park and the Badenoch and Strathspey districts. Other filming locations included Loch Morlich and the Landmark Forest Adventure Park.

The film was released through Bourret's production company JJLove Productions, as well as Nicely Entertainment.

Bourret's real life children Jett and Jax had roles in the film.

== Release ==
The film was released digitally on 1 November 2025, and followed by several broadcasts on television on Channel 5 in the UK over the 2025 Christmas period.
