= Kill Cruise =

Kill Cruise Der Skipper (German title)
- Directed by: Peter Keglevic
- Written by: Peter Keglevic
- Produced by: Matthias Wendlandt
- Starring: Jürgen Prochnow; Patsy Kensit; Elizabeth Hurley
- Cinematography: Edward Klosinski
- Edited by: Susanne Schett
- Music by: Brynmor Llewelyn Jones
- Distributed by: Rialto Pictures
- Release date: April 5, 1990 (Germany)
- Running time: 98 min.
- Country: Germany
- Languages: German; English

Kill Cruise (German title Der Skipper) is a 1990 film directed by Peter Keglevic and starring Jürgen Prochnow, Patsy Kensit, and Elizabeth Hurley.

== Plot summary ==
The story begins at sea when the unnamed Skipper of the sailboat Bella Donna reports a man overboard. The victim, Paul Pelikan, drowns before he can be rescued. People in the Bella Donna's home port of Gibraltar suspect that the Skipper deliberately pushed Paul overboard because he had had an affair with the Skipper's wife Mona. While nothing is proven, Mona believes the Skipper did in fact throw Paul overboard and leaves him. Heartbroken, the Skipper spends most of his time at the local bars getting drunk and swearing he will sail again, though the townspeople don't take his claim seriously.

Meanwhile, two English girls Su and Lou are barely making a living singing at local clubs. Though fast friends, there seems to be tension between the two. They put on a show at the California Bar that night, singing an English language version of Porque te vas (translated as You're Leaving Me). The Skipper falls hard for the two, especially after Lou performs an impromptu striptease at the end. After spending the night with the two girls, the Skipper agrees to their request to sail them to Barbados.

The voyage will take four weeks and all seems to be well at the start. The Skipper expresses some concern in his ship's log about how close the two girls are, then injects himself with a syringe. As time passes, Su flirts with the Skipper, but becomes upset when her advances are ignored, revealing a somewhat unbalanced personality. As tensions mount further, Su snoops through the Skipper's quarters and finds his serum bottles, syringes and his log book. She tells Lou that she thinks the Skipper is a murderer and a drug addict. When he finds his insulin missing, he throws Su overboard with a line to get her to reveal where she hid it. He pulls her back on board and gives her a one-hour ultimatum. He soon becomes very ill and incapacitated. A desperate Lou eventually finds the insulin and injects the Skipper, saving his life. The Skipper is grateful and later confesses his love for Lou. Su then walks in on them having sex. Su is heartbroken and starts crying. Lou, feeling guilty, tries to comfort Su.

Things seem to have smoothed over at the end, when the girls reprise their act, singing "You're Leaving Me" again. Without warning, Lou shoots the Skipper with a spear gun, killing him almost instantly. Su flees below deck. Lou takes a moment to draw a heart and arrow in the Skipper's pooling blood before going to the galley to make a cup of tea. She seems oddly calm while Su is terrified. Lou tries to calm Su down but ends up smothering her with a pillow.

As the end title states, three weeks later, the Bella Donna drifts to the Caribbean island of St. Lucia, with no one aboard.

== Production details ==
- Filmed on location in Gibraltar and Malta.

== Critical reception ==
- "Trivial thriller, psychologically implausible, with a weak acting performance." ("Trivialer Thriller, psychologisch unglaubwürdig und mit schwachen schauspielerischen Leistungen."), Lexikon des internationalen Films
- "Logic goes overboard pretty early..." ("Die Logik geht ziemlich früh über Bord..."), Cinema
