= The Survivors Club =

- Based on: The Survivors Club by Lisa Gardner
- Teleplay by: Nancey Silvers
- Directed by: Christopher Leitch
- Starring: Roma Downey; Jacqueline Bisset; Brian Markinson; Lauren Lee Smith
- Theme music composer: Douglas J. Cuomo
- Countries of origin: Canada; United States
- Original language: English

Production
- Producers: Lynne Bespflug; Christopher Leitch
- Cinematography: Paul Sarossy
- Editor: John Duffy
- Running time: 85 min
- Production company: CBS

Original release
- Network: CBS
- Release: 7 March 2004

The Survivors Club is a 2004 CBS television film directed by Christopher Leitch and starring Roma Downey, Jacqueline Bisset and Lauren Lee Smith as rape survivors. It is based on Lisa Gardner's novel of the same name. It premiered on 7 March 2004.

== Plot ==
Jilian (Downey), Carol (Bisset) and Meg (Smith) share a devastating ordeal, they were all rape victims of a vicious killer. They decide to help the police in their hunt for the perpetrator. However, on the first day of his trial he is assassinated by a sniper. His death makes suspects of the three women as a murder case enfolds.

== Cast ==
- Roma Downey as Jilian Hayes
- Jacqueline Bisset as Carol Rosen
- Brian Markinson as David Price
- Lauren Lee Smith as Meg Pesaturo
- Jerry Wasserman as Fitz Fitzpatrick
- Lorena Gale as Lieutenant Marcy Morelli
- James Remar as Roan Grifin
- Belinda Metz as Linda Pesaturo
- Michael Kopsa as Vinnie Pesaturo
- Pamela Diaz as Tawnya Como
- Bill Mondy as Jack Collins
