= Twenty-One (1991 film) =

- Promotional poster
- Directed by: Don Boyd
- Written by: Don Boyd; Zoë Heller
- Produced by: John Hardy; Morgan Mason
- Starring: Patsy Kensit
- Cinematography: Keith Goddard
- Edited by: David Spiers
- Music by: Michael Berkeley
- Release dates: February 1991 (Sundance): 4 October 1991 (US); 1 November 1991 (UK)
- Running time: 92 minutes
- Countries: United Kingdom; United States
- Language: English
- Budget: £810,000

Twenty-One is a 1991 British-American drama film directed by Don Boyd from a script co-written with Zoë Heller. Patsy Kensit stars as the 21-year-old protagonist. It premiered at the Sundance Film Festival in February 1991. It was released theatrically later that year in the United States on 4 October, followed by a British release on 1 November.

== Premise ==
Katie is a Londoner about to turn 21. She confides directly to the camera about her life, which includes her drug-addicted boyfriend Bobby, an affair with a married barrister, and the dissolution of her parents’ marriage. Katie's father Kenneth is a naïve car salesman who believes he can still patch things up with his philandering wife. When Bobby dies of an overdose, Katie reflects on her life and decides to move to Manhattan.

== Cast ==
- Patsy Kensit as Katie
- Jack Shepherd as Kenneth
- Patrick Ryecart as Jack
- Maynard Eziashi as Baldie
- Rufus Sewell as Bobby
- Sophie Thompson as Francesca
- Susan Wooldridge as Janet
- Robert Bathurst as Mr. Metcalfe

== Reception ==
The film received a rapturous response upon its premiere at Sundance, with Kensit being lauded for a star-making performance by some critics. Some festival goers likened Kensit's role to Julie Christie’s in the film Darling.

Reception in France was also enthusiastic but the film had a mixed reaction in the UK and US. TV Guide wrote, "Formally, Twenty-One resembles such 'swinging 60s' British films as Alfie and Georgy Girl, in which the slickness of the film's style is undercut by the pain of its characters, accented by anti-illusionist devices like having the characters speak directly into the camera, as Katie does here, prattling on ad nauseam while belaboring the obvious. The possible intent may have been to make an ironic commentary by processing the depleted 90s through a 60s prism." Michael Wilmington of the Los Angeles Times wrote "almost all the writing seems unrealized: intelligent but a little hollow, daring but a little dry, all the points slightly telegraphed, all the dialogue slightly unspontaneous. And though Boyd is probably trying for a more intellectual frame, he’s not witty enough to sustain it".

=== Nominations ===
Independent Spirit Awards

- Best Female Lead - Patsy Kensit

Sundance Film Festival

- Grand Jury Prize - Don Boyd

Deauville American Film Festival

- Critics Award - Don Boyd
