= Lisa Gardner =

American author of thrillers

- Born: 1972 (age 53–54)
- Education: University of Pennsylvania
- Occupation: Novelist
- Writing career
- Pen name: Alicia Scott
- Language: English

Lisa Gardner (born 1972) is a #1 New York Times bestselling American novelist. She is the author of more than 20 suspense novels, published in more than 30 countries. She began her career writing romantic suspense under the pseudonym Alicia Scott, before the publication of her breakout domestic thriller, The Perfect Husband, in 1997. TV and movie credits include At the Midnight House (CBS), Instinct to Kill, The Survivors Club (CBS), and Hide (TNT) as well as personal appearances on TruTV's Murder by the Book and CNN.

== Biography ==
Raised in Hillsboro, Oregon, she graduated from the city's Glencoe High School. Her novel Gone is set in a fictionalized version of Tillamook, Oregon.

In the mid-1990s, she was a research analyst in Boston with Mercer Management (now Oliver Wyman). She credited her long days doing research for giving her the skills needed to follow a line of investigation while learning new topics.

As of 2014, Gardner lives in New England with her family. She is known for her work with animal rescue and at-risk children, receiving the Silver Bullet Award from the International Thriller Writers in 2017 in honor of her efforts.

== Published works ==
=== As Lisa Gardner ===
==== Novels ====
The FBI Profiler, or Quincy & Rainie series

1. The Perfect Husband (1997), ISBN 1-56865-601-7
2. The Third Victim (2001), ISBN 0-7394-1471-2
3. The Next Accident (2001), ISBN 0-553-80238-0
4. The Killing Hour (2003), ISBN 0-553-80252-6
5. Gone (2006), ISBN 0-553-80431-6
6. Say Goodbye (2008), ISBN 0-553-80433-2
  6.5. "The 4th Man" (2016), short story, ISBN 978-1-53662-811-1, crossover with Detective D.D. Warren series
7. Right Behind You (2017), ISBN 978-0-525-95458-3
8. When You See Me (2020), ISBN 978-152474-500-4, crossover with Detective D.D. Warren series

The Detective D.D. Warren series

1. Alone (2004), ISBN 0-553-80253-4
2. Hide (2007), ISBN 978-0-553-80432-4
3. The Neighbor (2009), ISBN 978-0-553-80723-3
4. Live to Tell (2010), ISBN 978-0-553-80724-0
5. Love You More (2011), ISBN 978-0-553-80725-7, crossover with Tessa Leoni series
  5.5. "The 7th Month" (2012), short story, ISBN 978-0-755-39313-8
6. Catch Me (2012), ISBN 978-0-525-95276-3
7. Fear Nothing (2014), ISBN 978-0-525-95308-1
  7.5. "3 Truths and a Lie" (2016), short story, ISBN 978-1-511-36888-9
8. Find Her (2016), ISBN 978-0-525-95457-6
  8.5. "The 4th Man" (2016), short story, ISBN 978-1-53662-811-1, crossover with FBI Profiler series
9. Look for Me (2018), ISBN 978-1-524-74205-8
  9.5. "The Guy Who Died Twice" (2019), short story, ISBN 978-1-524-74540-0
10. Never Tell (2019), ISBN 978-1-78089-771-4
11. When You See Me (2020), ISBN 978-152474-500-4, crossover with FBI Profiler series

The Tessa Leoni series

1. Love You More (2011), ISBN 978-0-553-80725-7, crossover with Detective D.D. Warren series
2. Touch & Go (2013), ISBN 0-525-95307-8
3. Crash & Burn (2015), ISBN 0-525-95456-2

The Frankie Elkin series

1. Before She Disappeared (2021), ISBN 1-524-74504-9
2. One Step Too Far (2022), ISBN 978-0593185414
3. Still See You Everywhere (2024), ISBN 978-1538765067
4. Kiss Her Goodbye (2025), ISBN 978-1538765104

Stand-alone works

- The Other Daughter (1999), ISBN 0-7394-0414-8
- The Survivors Club (2002), ISBN 0-553-80251-8
- I'd Kill For That (2004), with more authors, ISBN 0-312-93696-6
- You'll Be Sorry (2026), ISBN 978-1538765142

==== Short stories ====
- "The 7th Month" (2012), ISBN 978-0-755-39313-8, Detective D.D. Warren series
- "3 Truths and a Lie" (2016), ISBN 978-1-511-36888-9, Detective D.D. Warren series
- "The 4th Man" (2016), ISBN 978-1-53662-811-1, crossover FBI Profiler series and Detective D.D. Warren series
- "The Guy Who Died Twice" (2019), ISBN 978-1-524-74540-0, Detective D.D. Warren series

==== Non-fiction ====
- Mom's Other Medicine (2021), guide

=== As Alicia Scott ===
==== Novels ====
The Walking After Midnight series

1. Walking After Midnight (1992), ISBN 0-373-07466-2
2. Shadow's Flame (1994), ISBN 0-373-07546-4

The Guiness Gang series

1. At the Midnight Hour (1995), ISBN 0-373-07658-4
2. Hiding Jessica (1995), ISBN 0-373-07668-1
3. The Quiet One (1996), ISBN 0-373-07701-7
4. The One Worth Waiting For (1996), ISBN 0-373-07713-0
5. The One Who Almost Got Away (1996), ISBN 0-373-07723-8

The Family Secrets, or Maximillian's Children series

1. Maggie's Man (1997), ISBN 0-373-07776-9m
2. Macnamara's Woman (1997), ISBN 0-373-07813-7
3. Brandon's Bride (1998), ISBN 0-373-07837-4

Stand-alone works

- Waking Nightmare (1994), ISBN 0-373-07586-3
- Partners in Crime (1998), ISBN 0-373-65014-0
- Marrying Mike... Again (1999), ISBN 0-373-07980-X, Men in Blue #13 series

==== Short stories ====
Partners in Crime (36 Hours series #9):

1. "Partners in Crime Part 1" (2014), novella
2. "Partners in Crime Part 2" (2014), novella
3. "Partners in Crime Part 3" (2014), novella

== Adaptations ==
- At the Midnight Hour (1995), Canadian TV movie directed by Charles Jarrott, based on the Alicia Scott novel At The Midnight Hour
- Instinct to Kill (2001), film directed by Gustavo Graef-Marino, based on novel The Perfect Husband
- The Survivors Club (2004), TV movie directed by Christopher Leitch, based on novel The Survivors Club. Starring Roma Downey and Jacqueline Bisset.
- Hide (2011), TV movie directed by John Gray, based on novel Hide. Starring Carla Gugino as D.D. Warren.

== Awards ==
- Hardcover Thriller of the Year from the International Thriller Writers for The Neighbor
- Grand Prix des Lectrices de Elle in France, also for The Neighbor
- Daphne du Maurier Award in 2000 for The Other Daughter
