= Caprice Bourret =

American socialite (born 1971)

Caprice
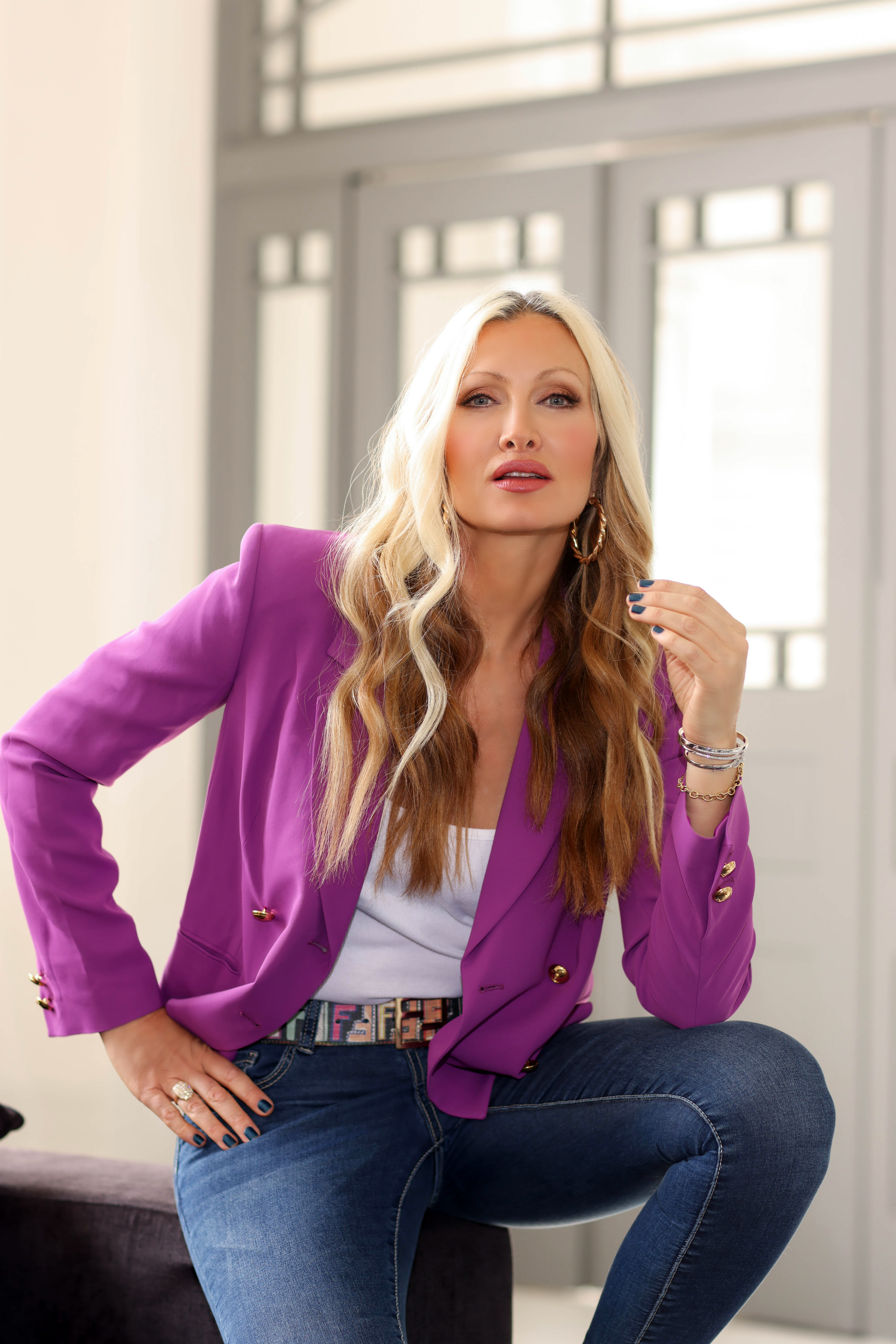
- Caprice in 2022
- Born: Caprice Bourret; October 24, 1971 (age 54); Hacienda Heights, California, U.S.
- Occupations: Socialite; singer; model; businesswoman; actress; television personality
- Years active: 1992–present
- Television: Ladies of London (2014)
- Spouse: Ty Comfort (m. 2019)
- Children: 2
- Website: capricebourret.com

Caprice Comfort (née Bourret; born October 24, 1971), known mononymously as Caprice, is an American socialite and media personality. She is known as an original main cast member on the Bravo reality television series Ladies of London (2014).

== Early life ==
Caprice Valerie Bourret was born in Hacienda Heights, California, on October 24, 1971, as the elder daughter of Dale Bourret, a French-Canadian estate agent, and his wife, Valerie Ann (née Pion), an American interior designer. She has a younger sister. Bourret's parents separated when she was four, and divorced in 1977. She was raised by her single mother and has no relationship with her father, who she has called "a good guy". Like her mother, Caprice is Jewish.

Bourret said in a 2010 interview that she had been Shomer Shabbat in her teens and that she then kept kosher and generally observed the Jewish festivals.

Caprice attended the private co-ed Catholic Bishop Amat Memorial High School in La Puente, California, graduating in the class of 1989. At the age of 16, while still in high school, Caprice started her first job, waiting tables.

== Career ==
=== As a singer ===
In 1999, Caprice was signed to Virgin Records and subsequently released her first single, "Oh Yeah" (UK No. 24), and the 2001 follow-up single, "Once Around the Sun" (also UK No. 24).

=== As a model ===
Caprice has appeared on more than 250 magazine covers including Vogue, GQ, Cosmopolitan, Esquire, Maxim, FHM, Playboy and the Swimsuit Issue of Sports Illustrated. She was named the world's sexiest woman by News of the World, GQ's Woman of the Year and Maxim's International Woman of the Year in three consecutive years. She has also been featured in television ad campaigns for Diet Coke and Pizza Hut.

=== As a businesswoman ===
In 2000, Caprice entered into a licensing agreement with British department store Debenhams for the use of her name on a lingerie range. Six years later, she bought back the licence and founded By Caprice Products, selling internationally to retailers and department stores. She designs, models and markets lingerie, swimwear and sleepwear.

In 2010, Caprice launched Bedding By Caprice.

In 2023, Caprice launched her production company JJLove Productions Ltd.

=== Film and television ===
Caprice starred in the films Hollywood Flies, Nailing Vienna and Jinxed In Love, all produced for HBO. In 2019, Caprice starred as Mrs. Ferdi in her first Christmas movie, Christmas in the Highlands. In 2024, Caprice went on to produce and star in two films. A Toast to Love, in which she played the antagonist, Eliza Van Deuzen – and A European Christmas, where she played the lead , Ivy Allen. In 2025, Caprice released her third Christmas movie, A Scottish Christmas Secret – in which she both produced and performed as the lead role of Tiffany Bennett. She is also in pre-production of Love in Ibiza (Working Title).

She also appeared in the British soap operas Hollyoaks and Dream Team and the comedy series Hospital. In 1998, Caprice hosted another British television series, Caprice's Travels. The show followed Caprice's tour through several major holiday destinations. She has appeared on Friday Night's All Wright and several award shows, including the European MTV awards and the World Music Awards, the British National Television Awards in 1996, 1997 and 1998 and several series for the television channels VH1 and E! Entertainment Television. In 2000, she featured in the Channel 4 documentary Being Caprice, in which a hidden camera recorded her life for ten days. Also that year, she hosted an evening at The Oscars and the red carpet event for the American Music Awards both of which were broadcast live on ABC Network.

Caprice was set to take part in the second season of Celebrity Big Brother UK, but pulled out. She later appeared on the third season of Celebrity Big Brother. She continued to make appearances on its companion series Big Brother's Little Brother until 2010.

Caprice was a cast member on the fifth season of the VH1 reality series The Surreal Life and appeared in other reality shows including Celebrities Under Pressure, Celebrities Disfigured, Three Celebrities and a Baby and Road Raja. In June 2006, she starred in the British independent film Perfect Woman. This followed an earlier appearance in the film The Man with Rain in His Shoes alongside Penélope Cruz. In 2007, Caprice was a judge on Sky One's Project Catwalk and Britain's Next Top Model. Three years later, she was head judge on TV3's show Style Wars in Ireland. In 2008, she came joint-second with Jimmy Osmond in a Celebrity Come Dine with Me episode. In 2017, Caprice competed in series 4 of Channel 4's The Jump.

Caprice is an original main cast member on the Bravo reality television series Ladies of London. The first season premiered on June 2, 2014, with Juliet Angus, Marissa Hermer, Annabelle Neilson, Noelle Reno, and Caroline Stanbury. The finale was aired on July 21, 2014. Caprice was dismissed from the cast.

In September 2019, Caprice competed in the second season of the 5Star reality series Celebs on the Farm, in which she finished as a runner-up. In January 2020, she competed in the twelfth season of Dancing on Ice with professional partner Hamish Gaman. Oscar Peter later replaced Gaman as Caprice's partner before they withdrew from the competition a week later.

In the 2019 horror film In2ruders, Caprice played a central antagonist, a manipulative figure in the music industry driving the film’s nightmarish conflict. Directed by Naeem Mahmood, the film featured an ensemble cast including the Bloom Twins, Samuel Anderson, Tony Hadley, Ricki Hall, Paul Chiedozie, and Megan Burns, with music by Nick Rhodes of Duran Duran.

=== Theatre ===
Caprice played Maureen in the musical Rent at The Prince of Wales Theatre. She also performed in The Vagina Monologues at the Arts Theatre in London's West End.

In 2007, Caprice produced and played the lead role of Lisa, in the off-Broadway production Debbie Does Dallas: The Musical at the Tesson Theatre in Johannesburg.

== Personal life ==
Caprice started dating British financier Ty Comfort in 2011. They have two sons together. The first was born via surrogacy in August 2013. The following month, she gave birth to the second child. The children are not twins; however, their parents treat them as such, celebrating their birthdays on the same day. In December 2019, the couple were married quietly at a Register Office in London. They live in the Notting Hill area of London.

Caprice dated a number of public figures including Rod Stewart, David Spade, Dennis Quaid, Lee Ryan, Tony Adams, Prince Andrew, Duke of York (later Andrew Mountbatten-Windsor), Calum Best, Fred Durst, Robert Tchenguiz, and Kevin Pietersen.

== Filmography ==
=== As herself ===
Year	Title	Notes
1992	The Big Breakfast	Guest Presenter
1996	Daddy's Girl	Short television
1996	2nd National Television Awards	Award Presenter
1997	An Audience with Elton John	Television special
1997	3rd National Television Awards	Presenter
1997	1997 MTV Europe Music Awards	Presenter
1998	The Jack Docherty Show	2 episodes
1998	Holiday Heaven	Episode: "Episode #1.3"
1998	Roy & H.G.'s Planet Norwich	Episode: "Episode #1.1"
1998	4th National Television Awards	Television special
1998	A Royal Birthday Celebration	Television film
1998	Friday Night's All Wright	Presenter
1998	Dreaming Of a Wright Christmas	Television special
1999	Bang, Bang, It's Reeves and Mortimer	2 episode
1999	An Audience with Lennon Lewis	Audience Member
1999	Caprice: Oh Yeah	Short film
1999	Fully Booked	Episode: "Episode #5.15"
2000	Brit Awards 2000	Presenter
2000	TFI Friday	Episode: "Episode #5.34"
2000	Being Caprice	Documentary series
2001	American Music Awards of 2001	Presenter
2001	Liquid News	1 episode
2001	Live & Kicking	Episode: "Episode #8.22"
2001	73rd Academy Awards	Presenter
2001	2001 World Music Awards	Television special
2001	Pop Goes Christmas	Television special
2002	Open House with Gloria Hunniford	1 episode
2002	Stars in Their Eyes	Episode: "Celebrity Christmas Special"
2002	Men in Black Training Video: UK	Video
2003, 2005	Ant & Dec's Saturday Night Takeaway	2 episodes
2003	RI:SE	1 episode
2003	Loose Lips	1 episode
2003	The Importance of Being Famous	Television special
2004	Through the Keyhole	Episode: "Episode #15.13"
2004	Kelly	1 episode
2004	Sports Relief 2004	Television special
2004	Celebrities Under Pressure	Episode: "Episode #3.3"
2004	Road Raja	Episode: "Episode #1.1"
2004	The Celebrity Awards 2004	Television special
2004	GMTV	1 episode
2004	Celebrities Disfigured	Television film
2004	Caprice: Making of a Supermodel	Television special
2004–2005, 2015–2017	Loose Women	5 episodes
2005	Celebrity Big Brother	British third season
2005	An Audience with Joe Pasquale	Television special
2005	2nd Meteor Ireland Music Awards	Television special
2005	100 Greatest Cartoons	Television special
2005	X-Rated: The TV They Tried to Ban	Television film
2005	The Late Late Show	1 episode
2005	Jimmy Kimmel Live!	Episode: "Episode #4.74"
2005	Tricky TV	Episode: "Episode #1.3"
2005	The Surreal Life	9 episodes
2005	Dirty Tricks	Episode: "Episode #1.5"
2005	3rd Irish Film & Television Awards	Television special
2005	Avid Merrion's XXXmas Special	Television special
2005	Party @ the Palms	Episode: "Episode #1.2"
2005, 2015	Ireland AM	2 episodes
2005–2006	The Big Idea with Donny Deutsch	2 episodes
2005–2006	Holly & Stephen's Saturday Showdown	2 episodes
2006	The Prince's Trust 30th Birthday: Live	Television special
2007	Britain's Next Top Model	Third season
2007–2010	Xposé	8 episodes
2008	Cooking the Books	Episode: "Episode #1.53"
2008–2009	Come Dine with Me	5 episodes
2009	The Alan Titchmarsh Show	1 episode
2009	The Podge and Rodge Show	Episode: "Episode #4.32"
2009	9th Meteor Ireland Music Awards	Presenter
2009	Gumball 3000: Coast to Coast	Video
2009	Live from Studio Five	Episode: "Episode #1.48"
2009	Hole in the Wall	Episode: "Episode #2.10"
2010	Big Brother's Little Brother	Guest Panelist
2010	The Real Hustle	Episode: "Episode #8.3"
2010	Style Wars	Judge
2010	The King Is Dead	Episode: "Chief of Police"
2010–2011	Celebrity Juice	5 episodes
2011	50 Greatest Wedding Shockers	Television film
2011	Al Murray's Compete for the Meat	Episode: "Episode #1.5"
2011	Daybreak	1 episode
2012	Rally On	Episode: "Anarchy at the Flag Drop: Los Angeles to Las Vegas"
2012, 2014	This Week	2 episodes
2013	Splash!	Contestant
2013, 2019	This Morning	2 episodes
2013	Ultimate Shopper	Guest
2014	Ladies of London	Series regular; 9 episodes
2014	Watch What Happens Live with Andy Cohen	Episode: "Caprice Bourret"
2014	Who's Doing the Dishes?	Episode: "Caprice Bourret"
2015	BBC Breakfast	Guest
2015	20 Moments That Rocked the 80's	Model
2015	My Mixtape	Episode: "Caprice"
2015	20 Moments That Rocked the 90's	Model
2015	Gumball 3000	6 episodes
2015	Big Brother's Bit on the Side	2 episodes
2015	20 Moments That Rocked the 00s	Model
2016	FHM: The Last of the Lads' Mags	Television special
2016	The Ray D'Arcy Show	Guest
2017	The Jump	Contestant
2017	Celebrity Money for Nothing	Episode: "Episode #1.6"
2018	Through the Keyhole	Episode: "Gregg Wallace, Scarlett Moffatt, Paddy McGuinness"
2019	Celebs on the Farm	Episode: "Episode #2.1"
2019	Most Shocking Celebrity Moments 2019	Model
2019–2020	Dancing on Ice	Twelfth season contestant
2019–2020	Jeremy Vine	2 episodes
2020	MTV Cribs	Episode: "Bradley Simpson, Caprice, Perri & Mike"
2023	Abbey Clancy: Celebrity Homes	Contributor

=== As an actress ===
==== Film ====
Year	Title	Role	Notes
1998	The Man with Rain in His Shoes	Caprice Bourret	
2001	Bubbles	American woman	Short film
2002	Nailing Vienna	Crystal	
2005	Hollywood Flies	Cherie	
2005	Ali Baba and the Forty Thieves: The Lost Scimitar of Arabia	Morgana	Voice role
2009	One Upon a Time in Dublin		
2010	The Pinocchio Effect	Mary	
2017	Sharknado 5: Global Swarming	Polaris	
2018	In2ruders	Ravana Serpentine	Short film
2019	Christmas in the Highlands	Mrs. Ferdi	
2020	The Gift Musical	The Good Fairy	
2024	Sun, Rosé and Romance	Eliza Van Deuzen	
2024	A European Christmas	Ivy Allen	
2025	A Scottish Christmas Secret	Tiffany Bennett	
2026	A Royal Romance in Ibiza	Dylan Harper	
TBA	An English Christmas Wish	Elise St Lawrence	In production

==== Television ====
Year	Title	Role	Notes
1997	Hospital!	Cheryl Chandler	Television film
1999	The Dream Team	Dani West	5 episodes
2001	Baywatch	Jackie Love	Episode: "Father Faust"
2003	Make My Day		Episode: "Karen Cohen"
2004	Hollyoaks: After Hours	Saskia	2 episodes
2004	Top Buzzer	Waitress	Episode: "Little Wednesday"
2019	MyBad!	Lucy	TV pilot
