= Claws of the Red Dragon =

Canadian television drama film

Claws of the Red Dragon is a Canadian dramatic television film, broadcast by NTD Canada in September 2019. A fictionalization of the political and diplomatic issues surrounding the 2018 arrest of Huawei CFO Meng Wanzhou by the Royal Canadian Mounted Police, the film centres on the efforts of journalist Jane Li (Dorren Lee) to expose the ties of Chinese telecommunications company Huaxing to the Chinese Communist Party.

The film's cast also includes Eric Peterson as James MacAvoy, Canada's ambassador to China and a thinly veiled fictionalization of John McCallum.

The film attracted controversy in August 2019 when, just days before its Canadian television premiere, American political strategist Steve Bannon signed on as the film's American distributor and was added as a credited executive producer. The addition of Bannon to the production team led the Canada Media Fund to withdraw its funding agreement. The film subsequently had its American television premiere on the news channel One America News Network in October 2019.

The film received a Canadian Screen Award nomination for Best TV Movie at the 8th Canadian Screen Awards in 2020.
