= Cross My Heart (Eighth Wonder song) =

Single by Eighth Wonder

from the album Fearless
- B-side: "Let Me In"
- Released: 13 June 1988
- Recorded: The Workhouse Studios, London
- Genre: Dance-pop
- Length: 3:26
- Label: CBS
- Songwriter: Michael Jay
- Producer: Pete Hammond

Eighth Wonder singles chronology
"I'm Not Scared" (1988)	"Cross My Heart" (1988)	"Baby Baby" (1988)

Music video
- "Cross My Heart" on YouTube

"Cross My Heart" is a song written by Michael Jay and recorded by English pop band Eighth Wonder. It was released in June 1988 by CBS as the second single from their debut album, Fearless (1988), and the group's sixth single. It proved to be almost as successful chartwise as "I'm Not Scared", reaching the top ten in Italy, Norway and Switzerland, and the top twenty in France, West Germany and United Kingdom. It was a minor success in the US, peaking at number 56, but remains the band's only American top 75 hit single. The music video was directed by Dieter 'Dee' Trattmann. The song was also notably recorded by American singer Martika.

== Overview ==
Songwriter Michael Jay says the track was originally written for Martika, who he was planning to produce and launch as a pop star. However, his publishing deal at the time required that his songs not be withheld exclusively for one artist, and were to be shopped around for placement with other acts. Eighth Wonder's version of "Cross My Heart" followed Tracie Spencer's January 1988 version which featured on her self-titled debut album. During that year, the song was also released by Martika on her eponymous debut album. Also in 1988, Hong Kong pop singer Sandy Lam recorded a Cantonese version of the song, titled "Once We've Touched (一接觸)" for her sixth album City Rhythm.

== Critical reception ==
In his review of the song, Chris Roberts from Melody Maker declared it as "a fantastic single". Jerry Smith of Music Week considered "Cross My Heart" an "irritatingly catchy and strikingly vapid pop number". Barry Egan from NME viewed it as "a disc of untouchable magnificance, a wondrous piece of neo-poetry." British synth-pop duo the Communards reviewed the single in Smash Hits, and while Richard Coles did not like it as much as "I'm Not Scared", Jimmy Somerville noted that it sounds like a Stock Aitken Waterman production, that Kensit's voice is stronger than on her previous single, and stated: "This is a fab record, actually. I love it".

== Track listings ==
These are the formats and track listings of major single releases of "Cross My Heart":

- 7" single
1. "Cross My Heart" – 3:26
2. "Let Me In" – 4:35
- 12" maxi 1
1. "Cross My Heart" (dance mix) – 7:06
2. "Cross My Heart" – 3:26
3. "Let Me In" – 4:35
- 12" maxi 2
1. "Cross My Heart" (club mix) – 6:50
2. "Cross My Heart" (house mix) – 7:29
3. "Cross My Heart" (dub mix) – 6:00
- CD maxi
1. "Cross My Heart" (dance mix) – 7:08
2. "Cross My Heart" – 3:27
3. "Let Me In" – 4:37
4. "Cross My Heart" (instrumental) – 4:31

== Credits ==
- Design – Stylorouge
- Photography – Eamon J. McCabe
- Edited by Chep Nunez
- Engineer assistant – Jeff Abikzer
- Engineer (remix) – Hugo Dwyer
- Keyboards – Mac Quayle
- Producer – Pete Hammond
- Remix – "Little" Louie Vega

== Charts ==
Chart (1988–1989)	Peak position
Australia (ARIA)	116
Finland (Suomen virallinen lista)	3
France (SNEP)	13
Ireland (IRMA)	16
Italy (Musica e dischi)	10
Italy Airplay (Music & Media)	16
Japan (Japanese Singles Chart)	42
Norway (VG-lista)	6
Spain (AFYVE)	2
Switzerland (Schweizer Hitparade)	6
UK Singles (OCC)	13
US Billboard Hot 100	56
US Hot Dance Club Play (Billboard)	10
US Hot Dance Music/Maxi-Singles Sales (Billboard)	15
West Germany (GfK Entertainment Charts)	17
