= List of Alpha Chi Omega members =

Alpha Chi Omega is an American collegiate women's fraternity founded at DePauw University in 1885. The following is a list of Alpha Chi Omega members.

== Academia ==
- Llerena Friend: librarian, teacher, author, and founding director of the Barker Center for Texas History
- Condoleezza Rice (Gamma Delta): former U.S. Secretary of State and director of the Hoover Institution at Stanford University

== Art ==
- Bonnibel Butler (Theta): illustrator of children's books and magazines, including St. Nicholas
- Carol Haerer (Xi): artist known for abstract painting

== Business ==
- Sherron Watkins (Alpha Phi): Enron whistleblower, former vice president of Corporate Development of Enron Corporation, USA Today and Time Person of the Year 2002
- Barbara W. Winder (Beta Nu): president of the Relief Society

== Entertainment ==
- Jayne Atkinson (Gamma): actress known for her Tony Award–nominated roles in The Rainmaker and Enchanted April
- Laura Berman (Alpha Iota): relationship therapist and television host of In the Bedroom with Dr. Laura Berman
- Rita Braver (Kappa): CBS news correspondent
- Hannah Brown (Alpha Upsilon): 2018 Miss Alabama USA winner and star of The Bachelorette
- Linda Cavanaugh (Psi): news anchor
- Eleanor Coppola (Alpha Psi): Emmy award-winning documentarian
- Jen Corey (Beta Rho): 2009 Miss District of Columbia winner, top 10 Miss America 2010 contestant
- Melissa d'Arabian (Alpha Iota): The Next Food Network Star winner and host of Ten Dollar Dinners
- Deidre Downs (Zeta Lambda): 2005 Miss America winner
- Carol Duvall (Beta Epsilon): host of The Carol Duvall Show
- Ruth Brooks Flippen (Gamma): screenwriter and television writer
- Elle Fowler (Beta Tau): co-creator of beauty and style-related tutorials on YouTube as AllThatGlitters21
- Georgia Frazier (Psi): Miss Oklahoma's Outstanding Teen 2009 and Miss Oklahoma 2015
- Kathi Goertzen (Omega): television news anchor
- Alyson Hannigan (Theta Xi): actress known for Buffy the Vampire Slayer and How I Met Your Mother
- Jenilee Harrison (Epsilon): actress known for Dallas and Three's Company
- Nancy Hoyt (Delta Kappa): participant in The Amazing Race
- Janet Hsieh (Theta Omicron): television host, Golden Bell Award winner, model, and violinist
- Laura Innes (Gamma): actress (ER)
- Natalie Jacobson (Alpha Tau): television news anchor
- Jane Anne Jayroe (Gamma Tau): 1967 Miss America
- Sarah Jones (Epsilon Kappa): contestant on Survivor
- Tami Lane (Zeta Eta): make-up artist and Academy Award winner
- Audra Levi (Alpha Psi): a star of Kid's Beat and co-founder of the SoCal VoCals
- Jean Martirez (Alpha Nu): news anchor
- Beth Mitchell (Zeta Xi): dancer and 1998 National Shag Dancing Champion
- Meredith Monroe (Upsilon): actress known for Dawson's Creek
- Agnes Nixon (Gamma): four-time Daytime Emmy–winning TV writer and producer
- Aubrey O'Day (Epsilon Psi): former member of Danity Kane and cast member of MTV's Making The Band 3
- Martha Quinn: MTV VJ, radio host and actress
- Melissa Rycroft (Psi): former Dallas Cowboys Cheerleader and contestant on The Bachelor and Dancing with the Stars
- Sarah Shahi (Iota Sigma): actress known for The L Word
- Trista Sutter (Alpha Mu): former star of The Bachelorette
- Dawn Wells (Rho): actress known for Gilligan's Island

== Law ==
- Robin S. Rosenbaum (Zeta Phi): judge of the United States Court of Appeals for the Eleventh Circuit
- Victoria Toensing (Alpha Mu): Republican Party operative and deputy assistant attorney general in the U.S. Justice Department

== Literature and journalism ==
- Kristen Soltis Anderson (Gamma Iota): Republican pollster, blogger, and author
- Ronda Carman (Delta Kappa) author
- Margaret Cousins (Alpha Phi): editor, journalist, and writer
- Shannon Fisher (Beta Delta): journalist
- Georgie Anne Geyer (Gamma): journalist and author
- Mary Emma Griffith Marshall (Lambda): editor and librarian
- Atoosa Rubenstein (Theta Psi): magazine editor
- Gail Sheehy (Alpha Iota): author

== Music ==
- Amy Beach: composer and pianist
- Edith Bideau: soprano singer
- Winifred Byrd: concert pianist
- Helen Hopekirk: pianist and classical composer
- Margaret Ruthven Lang: composer who was affiliated with the Second New England School
- Marian MacDowell: pianist and co-founder of the MacDowell Colony
- Adele aus der Ohe: concert pianist and composer
- Maud Powell (Alpha): violinist
- Julie Rivé-King: concert pianist, composer, and teacher
- Antoinette Szumowska: pianist
- Margaret Hoberg Turrell: composer and organist
- Ellen Beach Yaw: coloratura soprano
- Fannie Bloomfield Zeisler (Alpha): pianist

== Politics ==
- Jari Askins (Psi): Lieutenant Governor of Oklahoma
- Megan Barry (Omicron): mayor of the Metropolitan Government of Nashville and Davidson County
- Stephanie Bice (Gamma Epsilon): U.S. Representative for Oklahoma's 5th congressional district
- Nan Campbell (Rho): first woman to be elected mayor in the city of Bellevue, Washington
- Kathryn F. Clarenbach (Kappa): first chairperson of the National Organization for Women
- Stephanie Hilferty (Zeta Psi): Louisiana House of Representatives
- Kymberly Pine (Pi): Hawaii House of Representatives
- Condoleezza Rice (Gamma Delta): former U.S. Secretary of State and director of the Hoover Institution at Stanford University
- Emma Ridgway: member of the Washington House of Representatives for five terms
- Victoria Toensing (Alpha Mu): Republican Party operative and deputy assistant attorney general in the U.S. Justice Department

== Science and engineering ==
- Wally Funk (Gamma Epsilon): first female Federal Aviation Administration and National Transportation Safety Board inspector, one of the Mercury 13, and oldest woman in space as of July 2021
- Anna Menon (Iota Lambda): mission director at SpaceX and NASA biomedical flight controller for the International Space Station

== Sports ==
- Maddy Curley (Epsilon Chi): collegiate gymnast
- Julia Marino (Nu): freestyle skier and the first Winter Olympian to represent the South American country

== See also ==
- List of Alpha Chi Omega chapters
