= Clements High School =

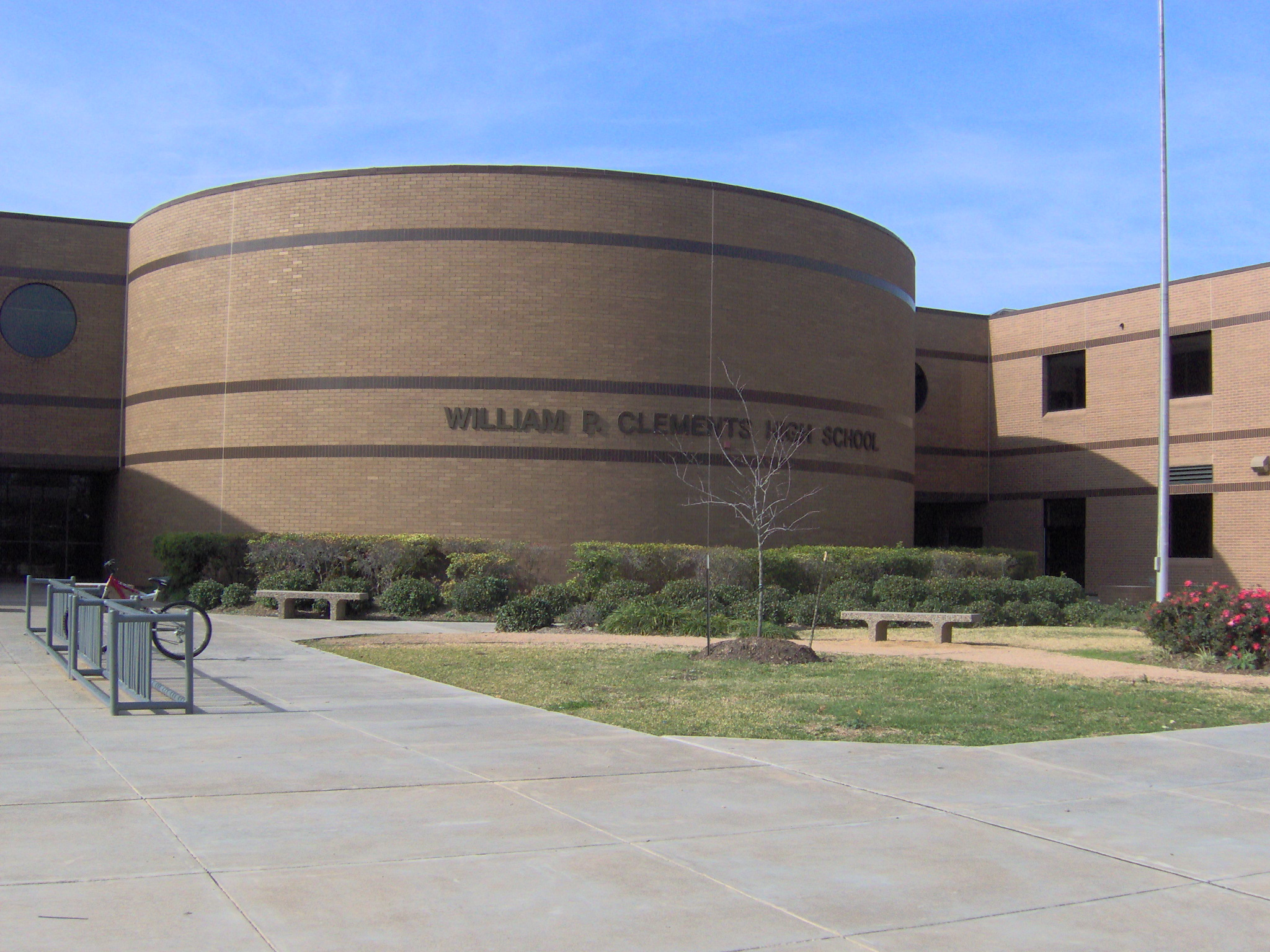

Location
- 4200 Elkins Drive; Sugar Land, Texas 77479; United States; 29.5741°N 95.6327°W

Information
- Type: Public
- Established: 1983
- School district: Fort Bend ISD
- Principal: Tara Baker
- Teaching staff: 138.08 (on an FTE basis)
- Grades: 9-12
- Enrollment: 2,641 (2024–2025)
- Student to teacher ratio: 19.13
- Hours in school day: 7
- Campus type: Suburban
- Colors: Columbia blue, Navy blue, and White
- Accreditations: SACS, TEA
- Nickname: Rangers
- 2022 TEA Rating: A (93 of 100)
- Website: www.fortbendisd.com/chs

William P. Clements High School, more commonly known as Clements High School, is a public high school in Sugar Land, Texas. Named after former Texas governor Bill Clements, Clements High School is a part of the Fort Bend Independent School District. The school serves most of First Colony and a portion of Telfair. It previously served sections of Riverstone until district rezoning prior to the 2014–2015 school year.

Clements High School has been recognized by Texas Monthly magazine in its list of the top high schools in the state of Texas. In US News magazine's 2018 ranking of United States high schools, Clements was ranked 446th out of 27,000 high schools nationwide. In 2010 and 2011, Clements High School was rated "exemplary" by the Texas Education Agency.

== History ==
Clements was occupied in 1983, making it FBISD's third comprehensive high school.

The school was named after William P. Clements.

In 2023, as part of a $1.26 billion bond package by Fort Bend ISD, a proposition was made calling for the construction of a new $222 million rebuild of Clements on the current site's athletic facilities. The move was made due to long-standing foundation issues; large parts of the school are sinking or being raised up, with cracks becoming so wide that they could be used to pass books between classrooms. The district argued that the budgetary and time-related costs for retaining the current building would far exceeded the costs for simply constructing another building. The proposal has passed, and the rebuild is currently underway.

== Academics ==
In 2014, Clements was ranked number 10 on the Best Math and Science High Schools in the Houston-Area list, and was listed as number 3 on the Best High Schools in the Houston-Area list. In 2024, Clements was ranked number 18 on the Best High Schools in the Houston-Area list, The average 2019 SAT scores were Math 690 and Verbal 660. The average 2019 ACT score was a 30. The average passing rate on AP exams was 92% in 2019. Clements is often recognized as one of the best high schools in the state of Texas, and has been ranked "Exemplary" by the Texas Education Agency for over 15 years.

=== State championships ===
- 2007 5A UIL Mathematics
- 2009 5A UIL Mathematics
- 2014 5A UIL Mathematics
- 2021 6A UIL Mathematics
- 2022 6A UIL Mathematics
- 2009 5A UIL Number Sense
- 2010 5A UIL Number Sense
- 2011 5A UIL Number Sense
- 2012 5A UIL Number Sense
- 2014 5A UIL Number Sense
- 2019 6A UIL Number Sense
- 2021 6A UIL Number Sense
- 2022 6A UIL Number Sense

== Extracurricular activities ==
In the 2010–2011 academic school year, Clements High School hosted the annual Texas French Symposium competition

The Clements men's soccer team was the 5A Texas state championship team in 2014, led by Todd Ericson.

Clements participated in the 2016 National Science Bowl, finishing in third place with an all-freshman team.

As of 2017, Clements DECA was the largest DECA Chapter in Texas by membership and has been one of the top 10 largest in the world for five years.

Clements has the largest number of degrees in the National Speech and Debate Association East Texas District. The school has gotten first at the Texas Forensic Association State Tournament in Public Forum Debate in 2009, in Congressional Debate in 2013, and in Public Forum Debate in 2015.

== Feeder patterns ==
The following elementary schools feed into Clements:

- Colony Bend
- Austin Parkway (partial)
- Colony Meadows
- Commonwealth (partial)
- Settlers Way (partial)
- Cornerstone

The following middle schools feed into Clements:

- Fort Settlement Middle School (partial)
- First Colony Middle School (partial)
- Sartartia Middle School (partial)

== Demographics ==
As of 2023–2023:

- American Indian/Alaskan Native 0.2%
- Asian 54.6%
- Black 7.5%
- Hispanic or Latino 13.0%
- Native Hawaiian/Pacific Islander 0%
- White 20.4%
- 2 or more races 4.4%

== Notoriety ==
=== Counter-Strike map controversy ===
In 2007, one day following the Virginia Tech shooting, the school received a phone call from a parent who complained that her child was playing a PC game involving shooting and killing people in an animated map of the school. Following the call, school officials promptly discovered the website where a 17-year-old alumni was distributing the map as a mod for Counter-Strike. Police searched his home under consent from his mother. They found nothing illegal, but confiscated five decorative swords and ordered the boy to erase the game and maps from his computer. Although he was not charged for the incident, he was subsequently transferred to an alternative education center. The incident caused a rift within the districts board of trustees, with some suggesting that the district's reaction was overwrought. It also angered the local Chinese-American community, to which the boy and his family belonged.

=== Cyber-bullying ===
Clements, along with the other Fort Bend High Schools of Elkins and Dulles, was subject to an act of cyberterrorism when a list titled Whimsical Girls of FBISD was posted on Facebook in April 2010. The list named several female students from the three high schools with graphic detail of promiscuous acts that the girls performed, locations of the acts, as well as severe name calling. While some described this as tattle-taling, others argued that the list was a direct form of verbal assault and demanded the expulsion of the offender who posted the list.

=== 2011 senior prank ===
On May 13, 2011, 16 students at Clements broke into the school. The group was attempting to move chairs set in place for AP testing from the gym to the roof of the school as a senior prank. The security alarm tripped during this and police were promptly dispatched, where they saw the group of men running away. They were able to detain some of them and decipher what had occurred. Three students - Brian Warshauer (who was also charged with possession of a controlled substance), Ali Lilani, and Taylor Ashford - were charged with burglary, evading arrest, and engaging in organized criminal activity. The charges were eventually reduced to just criminal trespassing. One of the students, Brian Yu, managed to flee but turned himself in the following day. He was sentenced to six years probation and 24 hours of community service, among other conditions, after a one-day trial in June 2013. 12 other students also turned themselves in, with 11 of them agreeing plea in July 2011 to be on probation. Additionally, the 11 students were forced to walk around Clements High School with signs around their neck reading "What I did was a crime not a prank," for four hours. Many parents and students believed the punishment to be too excessive.

=== Brian Yuen ===
On October 15, 2016, Brian Yuen, a 17-year-old member of the school's aquatics team, experienced a major medical emergency while competing at the Don Cook Natatorium. Staff performed CPR until paramedics arrived. He died shortly after being transported to the hospital. A vigil for him was attended by hundreds of family members, friends, and local community members. A GoFundMe established by his brother Charles raised $30,000 in funeral and medical expenses. A moment of silence was held at a football game between Ridge Point and Dulles High Schools that day, with cheerleaders and attendees wearing blue, Yuen's favorite color.

=== Arrest of principal ===
On December 11, 2023, the principal of Clements High School, Brian Shillingburg, was arrested on suspicion of soliciting a prostitute/other payor. He was caught as part of a sting operation entitled "Operation Naughty List" by the Fort Bend County Sheriff's Office. He was later indicted by the grand jury.

== Notable alumni ==
- Craig Ackerman, play-by-play announcer for NBA's Houston Rockets
- Matt Albers, Major League Baseball pitcher, Washington Nationals
- Roman Anderson, professional football placekicker
- Ronda Carman, author, public figure, entrepreneur
- Derek Carr (class of 2009), NFL quarterback, Las Vegas Raiders
- Jennifer Don, US Figure Skating national medalist, World Junior bronze medalist, National Champion of Taiwan
- JC Gonzalez, actor, songwriter, singer; participated in Victorious, Parks and Recreation, Blue, Los Americans and others
- Daniella Guzman, journalist with local TV station KPRC-TV (2006-2012 and 2022–present)
- Clay Helton, former USC head football coach, and current head coach at Georgia Southern University
- Tyson Helton, football coach
- John King, Major League Baseball pitcher, Texas Rangers
- K. J. Noons, professional mixed martial artist, won inaugural EliteXC Lightweight Championship, UFC Welterweight
- Loral O'Hara, engineer and NASA astronaut
- Mark Quinn, Major League Baseball outfielder, Kansas City Royals
- Jon Schillaci, serial rapist and former FBI Ten Most Wanted Fugitive
- Rashawn Slater, offensive lineman for NFL's Los Angeles Chargers
- Bryan Stoltenberg, lineman for NFL's San Diego Chargers, New York Giants, Carolina Panthers; member of 1995 College Football All-America Team
- Allison Tolman, actress, played Molly Solverson in FX television series Fargo
- Patrick Wang, actor, writer, director
- Thomas Bartlett Whitaker, murderer
- Kevin Wu, internet personality and early YouTube celebrity, known by the username KevJumba
