= Rashawn Slater =

American football player (born 1999)

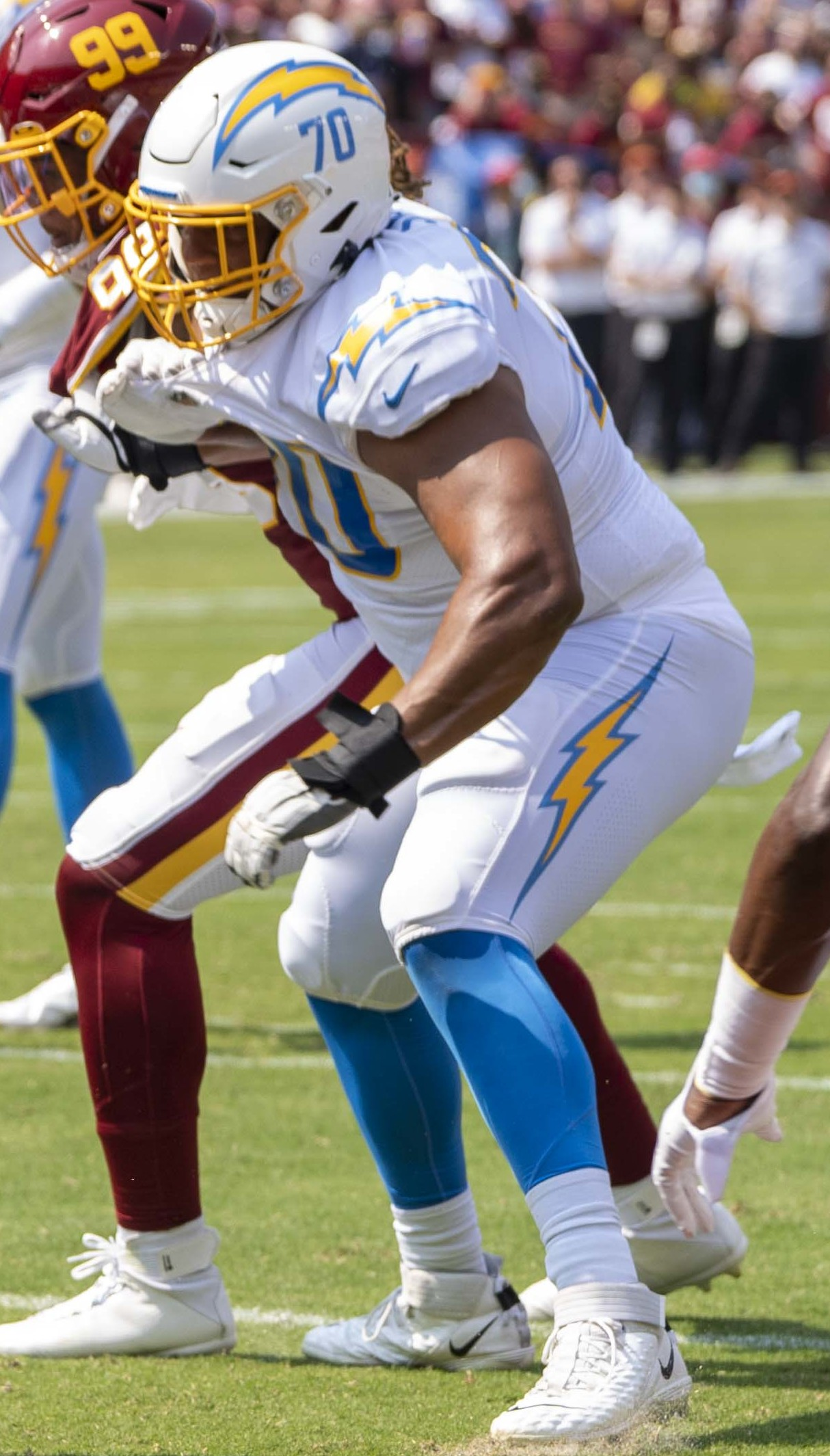
- Slater with the Los Angeles Chargers in 2021

No. 70 – Los Angeles Chargers
- Position: Offensive tackle
- Roster status: Injured reserve

Personal information
- Born: March 26, 1999 (age 27); Sugar Land, Texas, U.S.
- Listed height: 6 ft 4 in (1.93 m)
- Listed weight: 315 lb (143 kg)

Career information
- High school: Clements (Sugar Land)
- College: Northwestern (2017–2020)
- NFL draft: 2021: 1st round, 13th overall pick

Career history
- Los Angeles Chargers (2021–present)

Awards and highlights
- Second-team All-Pro (2021); 2× Pro Bowl (2021, 2024); PFWA All-Rookie Team (2021); Third-team All-Big Ten (2018)

Career NFL statistics as of 2025
- Games played: 51
- Games started: 51
- Stats at Pro Football Reference

Rashawn Slater (born March 26, 1999) is an American professional football offensive tackle for the Los Angeles Chargers of the National Football League (NFL). He played college football for the Northwestern Wildcats and was selected by the Chargers in the first round of the 2021 NFL draft.

== Early life ==
Slater grew up in Sugar Land, Texas, and attended Fort Settlement Middle School and Clements High School. He was named first team All-District as a junior and senior when he was also named second team All-Greater Houston. Slater was rated a three-star recruit and committed to play college football for the Northwestern Wildcats over offers from Illinois, Kansas, Wyoming and Rice.

== College career ==
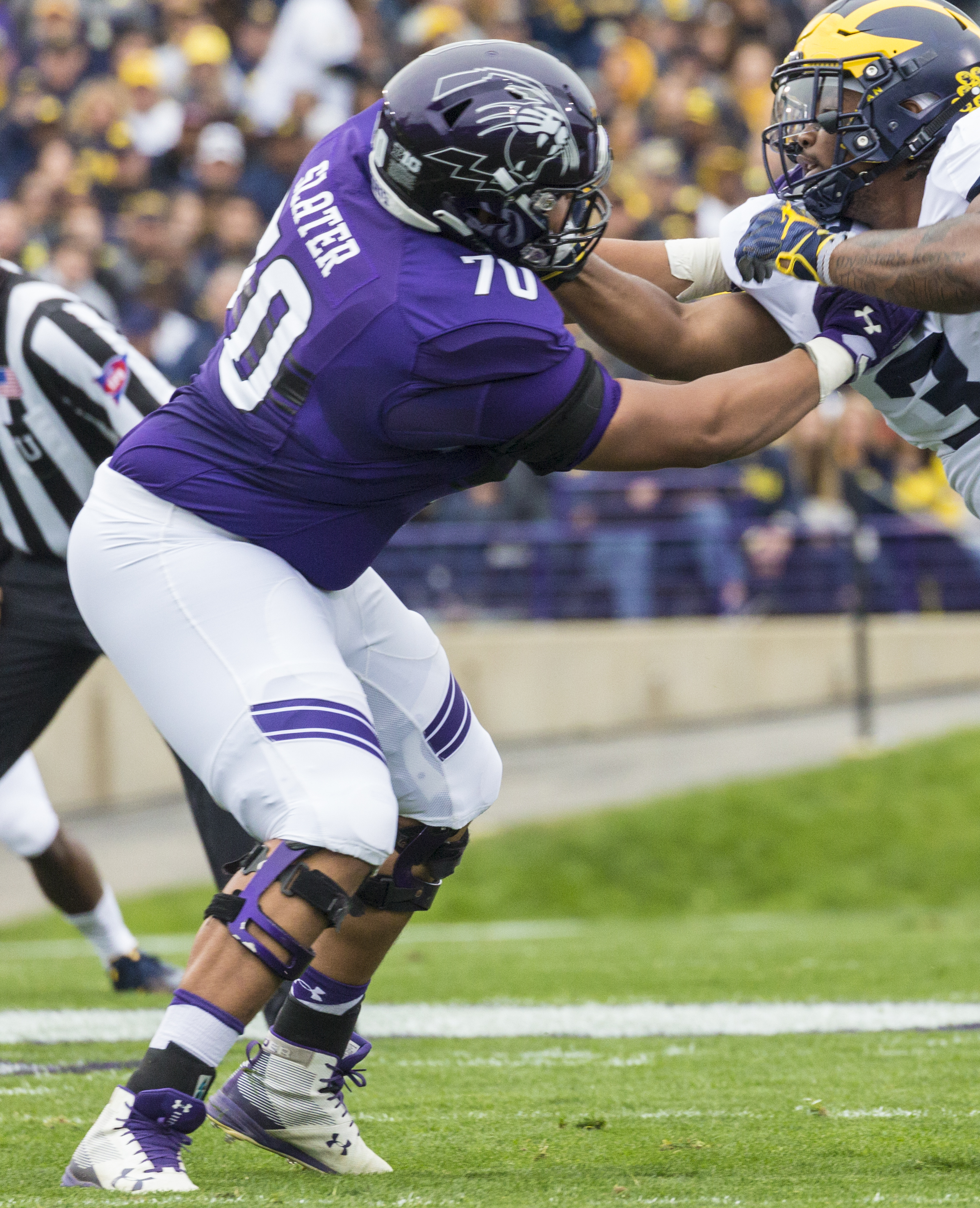
Slater with Northwestern in 2018

As a true freshman, Slater started 12 games at right tackle and was named Big Ten Conference All-Freshman Team. He was rated the best freshman offensive lineman in the nation by Pro Football Focus. As a sophomore, Slater was named to the third team All-Big Ten by the league's coaches after starting all 14 of Northwestern's games. Slater was named honorable mention All-Big Ten after allowing zero sacks in 11 starts as a junior.

Entering his senior year, Slater was named a preseason All-American, preseason All-Big Ten and to the Outland Trophy watchlist. Following the early announcement that Big Ten would postpone their 2020 season due to the COVID-19 pandemic, Slater announced that he would be preparing for the 2021 NFL draft. He remained enrolled at Northwestern and graduated with a degree in communications in December 2020.

== Professional career ==
Pre-draft measurables
Height	Weight	Arm length	Hand span	Wingspan	40-yard dash	10-yard split	20-yard split	20-yard shuttle	Three-cone drill	Vertical jump	Broad jump	Bench press
6 ft 4 1/4 in (1.94 m)	304 lb (138 kg)	33 in (0.84 m)	10 1/2 in (0.27 m)	6 ft 8 1/8 in (2.04 m)	4.91 s	1.68 s	2.89 s	4.45 s	7.48 s	33.0 in (0.84 m)	9 ft 4 in (2.84 m)	33 reps
All values from Pro Day

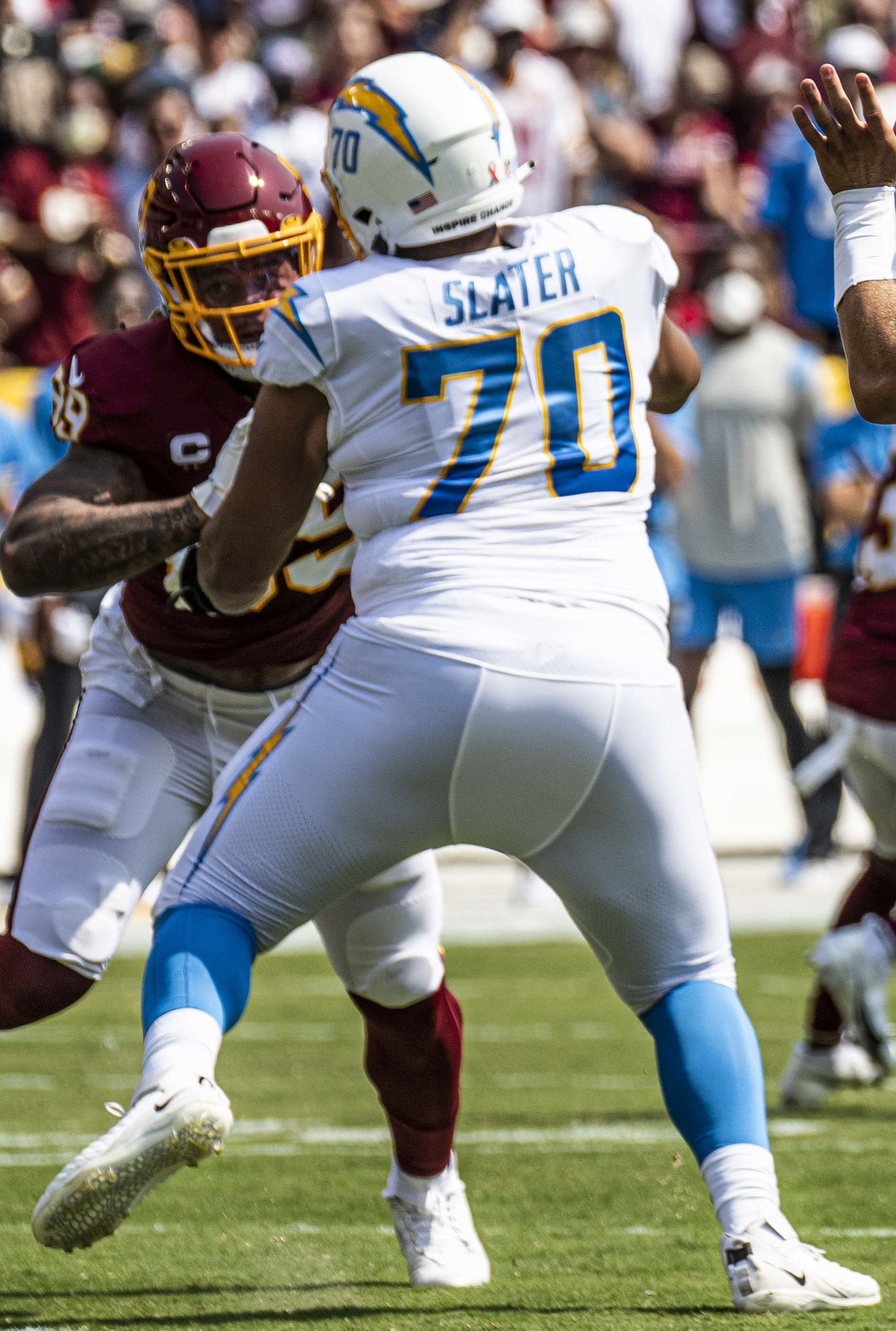
Slater blocked Washington Football Team defensive line, Chase Young in 2021

Slater was selected by the Los Angeles Chargers in the first round (13th overall) of the 2021 NFL draft. He signed his four-year rookie contract on July 27, 2021.

As a rookie, Slater was named the Chargers starting left tackle and was named to his first Pro Bowl as a starter. He was named to the PFWA All-Rookie Team.

Against the Jacksonville Jaguars in Week 3 of the 2022 season, Slater ruptured his biceps tendon, which ended his season. He started all 17 games in the 2023 season.

On April 29, 2024, the Chargers picked up the fifth-year option on Slater's contract. He started in 15 games in the 2024 season.

On July 27, 2025, Slater signed a four-year, $114 million contract extension with the Chargers, keeping him under contract through the 2029 season.

On August 7, 2025, Slater suffered a torn patellar tendon during practice, resulting in him missing the entire 2025 season.

=== Regular season statistics ===
Legend
**Bold**	Career high

Year	Team	Games		Offense					
Year	Team	GP	GS	Snaps	Pct	Holding	False start	Decl/Pen	Acpt/Pen
2021	LAC	16	16	1,116	**100%**	3	**3**	0	6
2022	LAC	3	3	175	86%	1	0	0	1
2023	LAC	17	17	**1,158**	**100%**	**7**	0	**1**	**8**
2024	LAC	15	15	904	97%	2	0	0	2
Career		51	51	3,353	–	13	3	1	17

== Personal life ==
Slater is the son of former NBA player Reggie Slater. His older brother, RJ, was an offensive lineman for the United States Air Force Academy from 2014–2017.
