= List of Alpha Chi Omega chapters =

Alpha Chi Omega is a collegiate women's fraternity established at DePauw University in 1885. When naming its collegiate chapters, after the first series, the new series drop one or more corresponding letter sets from the list of available names in this manner: In the "Alpha Alpha" series, there is no Alpha Alpha chapter; the name is unused. In the "Beta Alpha" series, there is neither a Beta Alpha chapter nor a Beta Beta chapter, and so on. Thus, the list of available collegiate chapter names shrinks by one more potential name each time a new series is cycled. The first 26 skipped names were assigned to the first 26 alumnae chapters. After Zeta Zeta, alumnae chapters are named in the same fashion as collegiate chapters, with the first letter repeated (Alpha Beta Alpha, Alpha Gamma Alpha, and so on).

== Alumnae chapters ==
In the following list of Alpha Chi Omega alumnae chapters, active chapters are indicated in bold and inactive chapters are in italics.

| Chapter designation | Charter date and range | Chapter name | Location | Status | Ref. |
|---|---|---|---|---|---|
| **Alpha Alpha** | 1906 | Chicago Alumnae | Chicago, Illinois | Active | |
| **Beta Beta** | 1906 | Indianapolis Alumnae | Indianapolis, Indiana | Active | |
| **Gamma Gamma** | November 6, 1907 | New York City Alumnae | New York City, New York | Active | |
| Delta Delta | | W. San Fernando Valley Alumnae | San Fernando Valley, California | Inactive | |
| Epsilon Epsilon | | Detroit Alumnae | Detroit, Michigan | Inactive | |
| **Zeta Zeta** | November 9, 1909 | Boston Alumnae | Boston, Massachusetts | Active | |
| Eta Eta | | Madison Alumnae | Madison, Wisconsin | Inactive | |
| **Theta Theta** | | Berkeley Alumnae Chapter | Berkeley, California | Active | |
| **Iota Alpha** | | | United States | Active | (Note: This chapter is for alumnae initiates.) |
| **Iota Iota** | 1914 | Seattle Alumnae | Seattle, Washington | Active | |
| **Kappa Kappa** | | Lincoln and Xi Alumnae | Lincoln, Nebraska | Active | (Note: Virtual Chapter.) |
| **Lambda Lambda** | February 7, 1914 | Grand Rapids Alumnae | Grand Rapids, Michigan | Active | |
| **Mu Mu** | | Kansas City Alumnae | Kansas City, Missouri | Active | |
| **Nu Nu** | 1916 | Denver Alumnae | Denver, Colorado | Active | |
| **Xi Xi** | | Portland Alumnae | Portland, Oregon | Active | |
| **Omicron Omicron** | | Twin Cities and Alpha Lambda Alumnae | Minneapolis and Saint Paul, Minnesota | Active | |
| **Pi Pi** | April 6, 1923 | Philadelphia Alumnae | Morton, Pennsylvania | Active | |
| **Rho Rho** | | Oklahoma City Alumnae | Oklahoma City, Oklahoma | Active | |
| **Sigma Sigma** | March 4, 1925 | Saint Louis Alumnae | St. Louis, Missouri | Active | (Note: Re-established the St. Louis Alumnae Club, which was established in September 1914 but went inactive after several years.) |
| Tau Tau | | Champaign Alumnae | Champaign, Illinois | Inactive | |
| **Upsilon Upsilon** | | Syracuse and Lambda Alumnae | Syracuse, New York | Active | |
| Phi Phi | | Meadville Alumnae | Meadville, Pennsylvania | Inactive | |
| **Chi Chi** | | Pittsburgh, Delta, and Kappa Nu Alumnae | Pittsburgh, Pennsylvania | Active | |
| Psi Psi | | Toronto Alumnae | Toronto, Ontario, Canada | Inactive | |
| Omega Omega | | Youngstown Alumnae | Youngstown, Ohio | Inactive | |
| **Alpha Beta Alpha** | | San Francisco Alumnae | San Francisco, California | Active | |
| **Alpha Gamma Alpha** | 1933 | Atlanta Alumnae | Atlanta, Georgia | Active | |
| **Alpha Delta Alpha** | | Spokane Alumnae | Spokane, Washington | Active | |
| **Alpha Epsilon Alpha** | | Washington, DC Alumnae | Washington, D.C. | Active | |
| **Alpha Zeta Alpha** | | Salt Lake City Alumnae | Salt Lake City, Utah | Active | |
| **Alpha Eta Alpha** | | Jacksonville Alumnae | Jacksonville, Florida | Active | |
| **Alpha Theta Alpha** | | Birmingham Alumnae | Birmingham, Alabama | Active | |
| **Alpha Iota Alpha** | | Columbus Alumnae | Worthington, Ohio | Active | |
| **Alpha Kappa Alpha** | 1935 | San Gabriel Valley Alumnae | Pasadena, California | Active | |
| **Alpha Lambda Alpha** | | Cincinnati Alumnae | Cincinnati, Ohio | Active | |
| Alpha Mu Alpha | | Akron Alumnae | Akron and Cuyahoga Falls, Ohio | Inactive | |
| **Alpha Nu Alpha** | | West Cleveland Alumnae | West Cleveland, Ohio | Active | |
| **Alpha Xi Alpha** | | Milwaukee Alumnae | Milwaukee, Wisconsin | Active | |
| **Alpha Omicron Alpha** | | Des Moines Alumnae | Des Moines, Iowa | Active | |
| **Alpha Pi Alpha** | | Fort Wayne Alumnae | Fort Wayne, Indiana | Active | |
| Alpha Rho Alpha | | Central NJ Alumnae #1 | Central New Jersey | Inactive | |
| **Alpha Sigma Alpha** | | Wichita Alumnae | Wichita, Kansas | Active | |
| **Alpha Tau Alpha** | | West Lafayette Alumnae | Lafayette, Indiana | Active | |
| Alpha Upsilon Alpha | | Albion/Jackson Alumnae | Albion and Jackson, Michigan | Inactive | |
| Alpha Phi Alpha | | Oak Park Alumnae | Oak Park, Illinois | Inactive | |
| **Alpha Chi Alpha** | October 8, 1938 | Tulsa Alumnae | Tulsa, Oklahoma | Active | |
| Alpha Psi Alpha | | Omaha Alumnae | Omaha, Nebraska | Inactive | |
| **Alpha Omega Alpha** | | Metro Detroit Alumnae | Detroit, Michigan | Active | |
| **Beta Gamma Beta** | | Albuquerque Alumnae | Albuquerque, New Mexico | Active | |
| **Beta Delta Beta** | | Lakeland Alumnae | Lakeland, Florida | Active | |
| Beta Epsilon Beta | | Evansville Alumnae | Evansville, Indiana | Inactive | |
| **Beta Zeta Beta** | November 21, 1944 | Houston Alumnae | Houston, Texas | Active | |
| **Beta Eta Beta** | | El Paso Alumnae | El Paso, Texas | Active | |
| Beta Theta Beta | | Topeka Alumnae | Topeka, Kansas | Inactive | |
| **Beta Iota Beta** | | East Lansing Alumnae | East Lansing, Michigan | Active | |
| **Beta Kappa Beta** | February 4, 1947 | Dallas Alumnae | Dallas, Texas | Active | |
| **Beta Lambda Beta** | | Austin Alumnae | Austin, Texas | Active | |
| Beta Mu Beta | | Norman Alumnae | Norman, Oklahoma | Inactive | |
| **Beta Nu Beta** | | Tucson Alumnae | Tucson, Arizona | Active | |
| **Beta Xi Beta** | | Greater Westchester Alumnae | Westchester, New York | Active | |
| **Beta Omicron Beta** | | Miami Alumnae | Miami, Florida | Active | |
| **Beta Pi Beta** | 194x ?–xxxx ?; June 2025 | Ann Arbor and Theta Alumnae | Ann Arbor, Michigan | Active | |
| Beta Rho Beta | | Laramie Alumnae | Laramie, Wyoming | Inactive | |
| Beta Sigma Beta | | Decatur Alumnae | Decatur, Illinois | Inactive | |
| Beta Tau Beta | | Salem Alumnae | Salem, Oregon | Inactive | |
| Beta Upsilon Beta | | Canton Alumnae | Canton, Ohio | Inactive | |
| **Beta Phi Beta** | | Toledo Alumnae | Toledo, Ohio | Active | |
| **Beta Chi Beta** | May 14, 1948 | Tacoma Alumnae | Tacoma, Washington | Active | |
| **Beta Psi Beta** | | Alliance and Alpha Eta Alumnae | Alliance, Ohio | Active | |
| **Beta Omega Beta** | | Phoenix Alumnae | Phoenix, Arizona | Active | |
| Gamma Delta Gamma | | Lawrence Alumnae | Lawrence, Kansas | Inactive | |
| Gamma Epsilon Gamma | | Walla Walla Alumnae | Walla Walla, Washington | Inactive | |
| **Gamma Zeta Gamma** | | San Diego Alumnae | San Diego, California | Active | |
| **Gamma Eta Gamma** | | Eugene Alumnae | Eugene, Oregon | Active | |
| **Gamma Theta Gamma** | 1951 | Los Angeles Alumnae | Los Angeles, California | Active | |
| **Gamma Iota Gamma** | | Santa Clara County Alumnae | Santa Clara County, California | Active | |
| **Gamma Kappa Gamma** | | San Antonio Alumnae | San Antonio, Texas | Active | |
| Gamma Lambda Gamma | | DuPage County Alumnae | DuPage County, Illinois | Inactive | |
| Gamma Mu Gamma | | Palo Alto Alumnae | Palo Alto, California | Inactive | |
| **Gamma Nu Gamma** | | Baton Rouge Alumnae | Baton Rouge, Louisiana | Active | |
| **Gamma Xi Gamma** | | Lubbock Alumnae | Lubbock, Texas | Active | |
| **Gamma Omicron Gamma** | | East Cleveland Alumnae | Cleveland, Ohio | Active | |
| **Gamma Pi Gamma** | | Long Beach Alumnae | Long Beach, California | Active | |
| Gamma Rho Gamma | | Mid-Michigan Alumnae | Mid-Michigan | Inactive | |
| **Gamma Sigma Gamma** | | Rochester Alumnae | Rochester, New York | Active | |
| **Gamma Tau Gamma** | | Newport Beach Alumnae | Newport Beach, California | Active | |
| **Gamma Upsilon Gamma** | | Orlando Alumnae | Orlando, Florida | Inactive | |
| **Gamma Phi Gamma** | | Tampa Alumnae | Tampa, Florida | Active | |
| Gamma Chi Gamma | | Chicago North Alumnae | Elgin, Illinois | Inactive | |
| **Gamma Psi Gamma** | | Sacramento Alumnae | Sacramento, California | Active | |
| **Gamma Omega Gamma** | | New Orleans Alumnae | New Orleans, Louisiana | Active | |
| **Delta Epsilon Delta** | 1943 | Colorado Springs Alumnae | Colorado Springs, Colorado | Active | |
| **Delta Zeta Delta** | | San Mateo Alumnae | San Mateo, California | Active | |
| **Delta Eta Delta** | | Arlington Alumnae | Arlington, Texas | Active | |
| Delta Theta Delta | | Anderson Alumnae | Anderson, Indiana | Inactive | |
| Delta Iota Delta | | Los Angeles South Alumnae | South Bay and Los Angeles, California | Inactive | |
| **Delta Kappa Delta** | | Palm Beach County Alumnae | Palm Beach County, Florida | Active | |
| Delta Lambda Delta | | Kay County Alumnae | Kay County, Oklahoma | Inactive | |
| **Delta Mu Delta** | | Gainesville and Gamma Iota Alumnae | Gainesville, Florida | Active | |
| Delta Nu Delta | | Shreveport Alumnae | Shreveport, Louisiana | Inactive | |
| **Delta Xi Delta** | | Knoxville Alumnae | Knoxville, Tennessee | Active | |
| Delta Omicron Delta | | Houston Alumnae #2 | Houston, Texas | Inactive | |
| **Delta Pi Delta** | | Gulf Coast Alumnae | Gold Coast, Florida | Active | |
| Delta Rho Delta | | Glendale Alumnae | Glendale, California | Inactive | |
| **Delta Sigma Delta** | | St. Petersburg Alumnae | St. Petersburg, Florida | Active | |
| Delta Tau Delta | | Contra Costa Alumnae | Contra Costa County, California | Inactive | |
| **Delta Upsilon Delta** | | Huntington Alumnae | Huntington, West Virginia | Active | |
| Delta Phi Delta | | Boulder Alumnae | Boulder, Colorado | Inactive | |
| **Delta Chi Delta** | | Reno Alumnae | Reno, Nevada | Active | |
| **Delta Psi Delta** | | Sarasota Alumnae | Sarasota, Florida | Active | |
| **Delta Omega Delta** | | Orange County Alumnae | Orange County, California | Active | |
| **Epsilon Zeta Epsilon** | | Huntsville Alumnae | Huntsville, Alabama | Active | |
| **Epsilon Eta Epsilon** | | Northern Virginia Alumnae | Northern Virginia | Active | |
| **Epsilon Theta Epsilon** | | Iowa City and Sigma Alumnae | Iowa City, Iowa | Active | |
| Epsilon Iota Epsilon | | Sioux City Alumnae | Sioux City, Iowa | Inactive | |
| Epsilon Kappa Epsilon | | South Bend Alumnae | South Bend, Indiana | Inactive | |
| Epsilon Lambda Epsilon | | Vermont Alumnae | Vermont | Inactive | |
| **Epsilon Mu Epsilon** | | Dayton Alumnae | Dayton, Ohio | Active | |
| Epsilon Nu Epsilon | | Rockford Alumnae | Rockford, Illinois | Inactive | |
| **Epsilon Xi Epsilon** | | Baltimore Alumnae | Baltimore, Maryland | Active | |
| **Epsilon Omicron Epsilon** | | Fort Worth and Iota Lambda Alumnae | Fort Worth, Texas | Active | |
| **Epsilon Pi Epsilon** | 2012 | Rhode Island Alumnae | Providence, Rhode Island | Active | |
| **Epsilon Rho Epsilon** | | Boise Alumnae | Boise, Idaho | Active | |
| **Epsilon Sigma Epsilon** | | Quad Cities Alumnae | Quad Cities, Iowa | Active | |
| **Epsilon Tau Epsilon** | | Tallahassee Alumnae | Tallahassee, Florida | Active | |
| Epsilon Upsilon Epsilon | | Bergen County Alumnae | Bergen County, New Jersey | Inactive | |
| Epsilon Phi Epsilon | | State College Alumnae | State College, Pennsylvania | Inactive | |
| **Epsilon Chi Epsilon** | | Rapids Alumnae | Cedar Rapids, Iowa | Active | |
| **Epsilon Psi Epsilon** | | Cheyenne Alumnae | Cheyenne, Wyoming | Active | |
| **Epsilon Omega Epsilon** | | Tuscaloosa and Alpha Upsilon Alumnae | Tuscaloosa, Alabama | Active | |
| **Zeta Eta Zeta** | | Louisville Alumnae | Louisville, Kentucky | Active | |
| Zeta Theta Zeta | | Casper Alumnae | Casper, Wyoming | Inactive | |
| **Zeta Iota Zeta** | | Charlotte Alumnae | Charlotte, North Carolina | Active | |
| **Zeta Kappa Zeta** | | Beaumont Alumnae | Beaumont, Texas | Active | |
| Zeta Lambda Zeta | | Hartford Alumnae | Hartford, Connecticut | Inactive | |
| Zeta Mu Zeta | | Bowling Green Alumnae | Bowling Green, Ohio | Inactive | |
| **Zeta Nu Zeta** | | Kalamazoo Alumnae | Kalamazoo, Michigan | Inactive | |
| Zeta Xi Zeta | | Springfield Alumnae | Springfield, Ohio | Inactive | |
| Zeta Omicron Zeta | | Broward County Alumnae | Broward County, Florida | Inactive | |
| **Zeta Pi Zeta** | | Richmond Alumnae | Richmond, Virginia | Active | |
| Zeta Rho Zeta | | Bartlesville Alumnae | Bartlesville, Oklahoma | Inactive | |
| Zeta Sigma Zeta | | Harrisburg Alumnae | Harrisburg, Pennsylvania | Inactive | |
| **Zeta Tau Zeta** | | Midland Alumnae | Midland, Texas | Active | |
| **Zeta Upsilon Zet** | | Amarillo Alumnae | Amarillo, Texas | Active | |
| **Zeta Phi Zeta** | | Muncie Alumnae | Muncie, Indiana | Active | |
| **Zeta Chi Zeta** | | Marin County Alumnae | Marin County, California | Active | |
| Zeta Psi Zeta | | Stillwater Alumnae | Stillwater, Oklahoma | Inactive | |
| **Zeta Omega Zeta** | | West Suburban Chicago Alumnae | Western Chicago, Illinois | Active | |
| **Eta Theta Eta** | 1980 | Nashville Alumnae | Nashville, Tennessee | Active | |
| **Eta Iota Eta** | | Pensacola and Kappa Xi Alumnae | Pensacola, Florida | Active | |
| Eta Kappa Eta | | North San Diego Alumnae | San Diego, California | Active | |
| Eta Lambda Eta | | Newark Alumnae | Newark, Ohio | Inactive | |
| Eta Mu Eta | | Ames Alumnae | Ames, Iowa | Inactive | |
| Eta Nu Eta | | Richmond Alumnae | Wayne County and Richmond, Indiana | Inactive | |
| Eta Xi Eta | | Fairfield County Alumnae | Fairfield County, Connecticut | Inactive | |
| **Eta Omicron Eta** | | Athens, GA and Beta Sigma Alumnae | Athens, Georgia | Active | |
| Eta Pi Eta | | Montgomery Alumnae | Montgomery, Alabama | Inactive | |
| **Eta Rho Eta** | | Central Coast Alumnae | Central Coast Area, California | Active | |
| **Eta Sigma Eta** | | Upper Pinellas Alumnae | Upper Pinellas County, Florida | Active | |
| Eta Tau Eta | | Parma Alumnae | Parma and Berea, Ohio | Inactive | |
| Eta Upsilon Eta | | Santa Fe Alumnae | Santa Fe, New Mexico | Inactive | |
| Eta Phi Eta | | Lake Shore Alumnae | Painesville, Ohio | Inactive | |
| **Eta Chi Eta** | | Racine Alumnae | Racine, Wisconsin | Active | |
| Eta Psi Eta | | Monmouth County Alumnae | Monmouth County, New Jersey | Inactive | |
| **Eta Omega Eta** | | Fort Collins Alumnae | Fort Collins, Colorado | Active | |
| Theta Iota Theta | | Los Angeles Westside Alumnae | Westside, Los Angeles, California | Inactive | |
| **Theta Kappa Theta** | | Springfield and Zeta Sigma Alumnae | Springfield, Missouri | Active | |
| **Theta Lambda Theta** | 1999 | Terre Haute and Epsilon Omicron Alumnae | Terre Haute, Indiana | Active | |
| **Theta Mu Theta** | | Auburn Alumnae | Auburn, Alabama | Active | |
| **Theta Nu Theta** | | Indiana Dunes Alumnae | Porter, Indiana | Active | |
| **Theta Xi Theta** | | Memphis Alumnae | Memphis, Tennessee | Active | |
| **Theta Omicron Theta** | | Triangle Alumnae | Raleigh, North Carolina | Active | |
| Theta Pi Theta | | Rio Grande Alumnae | Rio Grande Valley, Texas | Inactive | |
| **Theta Rho Theta** | | Piedmont Triad Alumnae | Piedmont Triad, North Carolina | Active | |
| **Theta Sigma Theta** | | Greenville Alumnae | Greenville, South Carolina | Active | |
| Theta Tau Theta | | Princeton Alumnae | Princeton, New Jersey | Inactive | |
| Theta Upsilon Theta | | Sun Cities Alumnae | Sun City, Arizona | Inactive | |
| **Theta Phi Theta** | | Broward County Alumnae | Broward County, Florida | Active | |
| Theta Chi Theta | | Rochester Alumnae | Rochester, Michigan | Inactive | |
| **Theta Psi Theta** | | Waco and Theta Iota Alumnae | Waco, Texas | Active | |
| Theta Omega Theta | | Noblesville Alumnae | Noblesville, Indiana | Inactive | |
| Iota Kappa Iota | | Annapolis Alumnae | Annapolis, Maryland | Inactive | |
| **Iota Lambda Iota** | | Lake County Alumnae | Lake County, Illinois | Active | |
| Iota Mu Iota | | Traverse City Alumnae | Traverse City, Michigan | Inactive | |
| **Iota Nu Iota** | | Treasure Coast Alumnae | Treasure Coast, Florida | Active | |
| Iota Xi Iota | | Carmel Alumnae | Carmel, Indiana | Inactive | |
| Iota Omicron Iota | | Skagit Valley Alumnae | Skagit Valley, Washington | Inactive | |
| Iota Pi Iota | | Midland Alumnae | Midland, Michigan | Inactive | |
| **Iota Rho Iota** | | Stockton/San Joaquin Alumnae | Stockton and San Joaquin County, California | Active | |
| Iota Sigma Iota | | Las Cruces Alumnae | Las Cruces, New Mexico | Inactive | |
| **Iota Tau Iota** | | Atlantic City Alumnae | Atlantic City, New Jersey | Active | |
| **Iota Upsilon Iota** | | Williamsburg Alumnae | Williamsburg, Virginia | Active | |
| Iota Phi Iota | | Duncan Alumnae | Duncan, Oklahoma | Inactive | |
| Iota Chi Iota | | Venice Alumnae | Venice, Florida | Inactive | |
| **Iota Psi Iota** | March 30, 1987 | Clear Lake Alumnae | Clear Lake, Texas | Active | |
| Iota Omega Iota | | Boca Raton Alumnae | Boca Raton, Florida | Inactive | |
| **Kappa Lambda Kappa** | | Jackson Alumnae | Jackson, Mississippi | Active | |
| **Kappa Mu Kappa** | | Riverside and Iota Xi Alumnae | Riverside and San Bernardino, California | Active | |
| **Kappa Nu Kappa** | | Columbia Alumnae | Columbia, South Carolina | Active | |
| Kappa Xi Kappa | | Capital District Alumnae | Albany, New York | Inactive | |
| **Kappa Omicron Kappa** | 1992 | San Diego Coast Alumnae | San Diego, California | Active | |
| Kappa Pi Kappa | | Charleston Alumnae | Charleston, West Virginia | Inactive | |
| Kappa Rho Kappa | | Anchorage Alumnae | Anchorage, Alaska | Inactive | |
| **Kappa Sigma Kappa** | | Little Rock Alumnae | Little Rock, Arkansas | Active | |
| **Kappa Tau Kappa** | | Las Vegas Alumnae | Las Vegas, Nevada | Active | |
| **Kappa Upsilon Kappa** | | Mid-Missouri Alumnae | Mid-Missouri | Active | |
| Kappa Phi Kappa | | Georgetown Alumnae | Georgetown, Texas | Inactive | |
| Kappa Chi Kappa | | Essex Area Alumnae | Essex, New Jersey | Inactive | |
| **Kappa Psi Kappa** | | Northwest Dallas Alumnae | North Dallas, Texas | Active | |
| Kappa Omega Kappa | | Davis Alumnae | Davis, California | Inactive | |
| Lambda Mu Lambda | | San Diego North Alumnae | San Diego, California | Inactive | |
| **Lambda Nu Lambda** | | New Haven and Iota Phi Alumnae | Greater New Haven|, Connecticut | Active | |
| **Lambda Omicron Lambda** | | Ocala Alumnae | Ocala, Florida | Active | |
| Lambda Pi Lambda | | Hamilton Alumnae | Hamilton, New York | Inactive | |
| Lambda Rho Lambda | | Daytona Beach Alumnae | Daytona Beach, Florida | Inactive | |
| Lambda Sigma Lambda | | Central Kentucky Alumnae | Central Kentucky | Inactive | |
| Lambda Tau Lambda | | Greenwood Alumnae | Greenwood, Indiana | Inactive | |
| **Lambda Upsilon Lambda** | | Asheville and Zeta Omega Alumnae | Asheville, North Carolina | Active | |
| **Lambda Phi Lambda** | 2012 | Charleston Alumnae | Charleston, South Carolina | Active | |
| Lambda Chi Lambda | | Columbus Alumnae #2 | Columbus, Ohio | Inactive | |
| **Lambda Psi Lambda** | | College Station and Zeta Nu Alumnae | College Station, Texas | Active | |
| Lambda Omega Lambda | | St. George Alumnae | St. George, Utah | Inactive | |
| Mu Nu Mu | | Charlottesville Alumnae | Charlottesville, Virginia | Inactive | |
| Mu Xi Mu | | Springfield Alumnae | Springfield, Illinois | Inactive | |
| **Mu Omicron Mu** | | Murfreesboro and Iota Chi Alumnae | Murfreesboro, Tennessee | Active | |
| **Mu Pi Mu** | | San Fernando Valley Alumnae | San Fernando Valley, California | Active | |
| Mu Rho Mu | | Indianola Alumnae | Indianola, Iowa | Inactive | |
| Mu Sigma Mu | | State of Washington Alumnae | Washington | Inactive | |
| **Mu Tau Mu** | September 24, 2004 | Zeta Upsilon Alumnae | Cleveland, Ohio | Active | |
| **Mu Upsilon Mu** | | Savannah/Lowcountry Alumnae | Savannah, Georgia | Active | |
| **Mu Phi Mu** | | Mobile Alumnae | Mobile, Alabama | Active | |
| Mu Chi Mu | | Mankato Alumnae | Mankato, Minnesota | Inactive | |
| **Mu Psi Mu** | | Coachella Alumnae | Coachella, California | Active | |
| Mu Omega Mu | | Zeta Omega Alumnae | Cullowhee, North Carolina | Inactive | |
| **Nu Xi Nu** | | Santa Clarita Alumnae | Santa Clarita, California | Active | |
| Nu Omicron Nu | | Santa Barbara Alumnae | Santa Barbara, California | Inactive | |
| Nu Pi Nu | | Ruston/Monroe Alumnae | Ruston and Monroe, Louisiana | Inactive | |
| Nu Rho Nu | | Theta Omicron Alumnae | | Active | |
| Nu Sigma Nu | | State of Montana Alumnae | Montana | Inactive | |
| Nu Tau Nu | June 3, 2006 | Gamma Lambda Alumnae | | Inactive | |
| Nu Upsilon Nu | | Hendricks/Putnam Alumnae | Hendricks County and Putnam County, Indiana | Inactive | |
| Nu Phi Nu | | Virginia North Alumnae | Northern Virginia | Inactive | |
| Nu Chi Nu | | Tyler Alumnae | Tyler, Texas | Inactive | |
| Nu Psi Nu | | Psi Alumnae | Norman, Oklahoma | Inactive | |
| **Nu Omega Nu** | April 15, 2007 | Alpha Alumnae | Greencastle, Indiana | Active | |
| **Xi Omicron Xi** | | Wilmington and Kappa Pi Alumnae | Wilmington, North Carolina | Active | |
| **Xi Pi Xi** | November 10, 2007 | Epsilon Eta Alumnae | Nacogdoches, Texas | Active | |
| Xi Rho Xi | | Zeta Kappa Alumnae | Las Cruces, New Mexico | Inactive | |
| Xi Sigma Xi | July 14, 2008 | Heritage Network | Indianapolis, Indiana | Inactive | (Note: This chapter promotes and preserves the heritage and history of Alpha Chi Omega.) |
| **Xi Tau Xi** | | Central NJ Alumnae | Central New Jersey | Active | |
| Xi Upsilon Xi | | Iota Omega Alumnae | Kenosha, Wisconsin | Inactive | |
| Xi Phi Xi | | Far West Houston Alumnae | Houston, Texas | Inactive | |
| **Xi Chi Xi** | | Tau Alumnae | Gainesville, Georgia | Active | |
| Xi Psi Xi | March 21, 2010 | Gamma Chi Alumnae | DeLand, Florida | Inactive | |
| **Xi Omega Xi** | July 11, 2010 | Beta Eta Alumnae | Tallahassee, Florida | Active | |
| Omicron Pi Omicron | July 11, 2010 | Delta Chi Alumnae | Missouri | Inactive | |
| **Omicron Rho Omicron** | | Montgomery County Alumnae | Montgomery County, Texas | Active | |
| Omicron Sigma Omicron | | Theta Lambda Alumnae | South Carolina | Inactive | |
| Omicron Tau Omicron | | Roanoke Alumnae | Lynchburg and Roanoke, Virginia | Inactive | |
| **Omicron Upsilon Omicron** | February 2011 | Delta Zeta Alumnae | Mount Pleasant, Michigan | Active | |
| **Omicron Phi Omicron** | | Zeta Pi Alumnae | Tempe, Arizona | Active | |
| **Omicron Chi Omicron** | | Coastal Delaware Alumnae | Delaware | Active | |
| Omicron Psi Omicron | | Epsilon Pi Alumnae | Americus, Georgia | Inactive | |
| **Omicron Omega Omicron** | | Grand Forks and Alpha Pi Alumnae | Grand Forks, North Dakota | Active | |
| Pi Rho Pi | | Lehigh Valley Alumnae | Lehigh Valley, Pennsylvania | Inactive | |
| **Pi Sigma Pi** | | Military Alumnae | Indianapolis, Indiana | Active | |
| Pi Tau Pi | | North Tampa Alumnae | Tampa, Florida | Inactive | |
| **Pi Upsilon Pi** | | Fayetteville and Delta Rho Alumnae | Fayetteville, Arkansas | Active | |
| Pi Phi Pi | | Theta Tau Alumnae | New Brunswick, New Jersey | Inactive | |
| **Pi Chi Pi** | | Peoria and Zeta Eta Alumnae | Peoria, Illinois | Active | |
| **Pi Psi Pi** | October 15, 2013 | Beta Lambda Alumnae | Tucson, Arizona | Active | |
| **Pi Omega Pi** | | Epsilon Chi Alumnae | Chapel Hill, North Carolina | Active | |
| **Rho Sigma Rho** | | Bossier City Alumnae Chapter | Bossier City, Louisiana | Active | |
| **Rho Tau Rho** | January 23, 2015 | Manhattan, KS and Gamma Zeta Alumnae | Manhattan, Kansas | Active | |
| **Rho Upsilon Rho** | | Lexington Area and Delta Omega Alumnae | Lexington, Kentucky | Active | |
| **Rho Phi Rho** | | Gamma Omicron Alumnae | Huntington, West Virginia | Active | |
| **Rho Chi Rho** | | Alumnae Initiates | Indianapolis, Indiana | Active | |
| **Rho Psi Rho** | | Upsilon Alumnae | Decatur, Illinois | Active | |
| **Rho Omega Rho** | | Hattiesburg Alumnae | Hattiesburg, Mississippi | Active | |
| **Sigma Tau Sigma** | | Central Massachusetts Alumnae | Central Massachusetts | Active | |
| Sigma Upsilon Sigma | | Arlington Alumnae | Arlington, Virginia | Inactive | |
| **Sigma Phi Sigma** | | Alpha Omega Alumnae | Birmingham, Alabama | Active | |
| **Sigma Chi Sigma** | | The Villages Alumnae | The Villages, Florida | Active | |
| **Sigma Psi Sigma** | | Omega Alumnae | Pullman, Washington | Active | |
| **Sigma Omega Sigma** | | Zeta Rho Alumnae | Midland, Michigan | Active | |
| **Tau Upsilon Tau** | | Alpha Psi Alumnae | Los Angeles, California | Active | |
| **Tau Phi Tau** | | Fresno Alumnae Chapter | Fresno, California | Active | |
| **Tau Chi Tau** | | Hollywood Alumnae | Hollywood, California | Active | |
| **Tau Psi Tau** | | Norfolk/Virginia Beach Alumnae | Norfolk, Virginia | Active | |
| **Tau Omega Tau** | | Northeast Dallas Alumnae | Northeast Dallas, Texas | Active | |

== Collegiate chapters ==
In the following list of Alpha Chi Omega collegiate chapters, active chapters are indicated in bold and inactive chapters are in italics.

| Chapter | Charter date and range | Institution | City or county | State or province | Status | Ref. |
|---|---|---|---|---|---|---|
| **Alpha** | October 15, 1885 | DePauw University | Greencastle | Indiana | Active | |
| **Beta** | May 27, 1887 | Albion College | Albion | Michigan | Active | |
| **Gamma** | November 14, 1890 | Northwestern University | Evanston | Illinois | Active | |
| **Delta** | January 29, 1891 | Allegheny College | Meadville | Pennsylvania | Active | |
| **Epsilon** | June 16, 1895 – 1898; 1905 | University of Southern California | Los Angeles | California | Active | |
| Zeta | December 15, 1895 – June 1, 1950 | New England Conservatory of Music | Boston | Massachusetts | Inactive | |
| **Eta** | June 16, 1898 – June 1899; April 1, 1921 | Bucknell University | Lewisburg | Pennsylvania | Active | (Note: Chapter formed by absorbing Phi Delta Kappa, established in 1898. It was reformed in 1921 by absorbing Zeta Nu, established in 1920.) |
| **Theta** | November 19, 1898 | University of Michigan | Ann Arbor | Michigan | Active | |
| **Iota** | December 8, 1899 | University of Illinois at Urbana-Champaign | Urbana | Illinois | Active | |
| **Kappa** | December 18, 1903 | University of Wisconsin–Madison | Madison | Wisconsin | Active | |
| **Lambda** | December 18, 1906 – January 28, 2011; November 5, 2016 | Syracuse University | Syracuse | New York | Active | |
| Mu | May 13, 1907 – June 11, 2007 | Simpson College | Indianola | Iowa | Inactive | (Note: Chapter formed by absorbing Alpha Alpha Gamma, established in 1906.) |
| **Nu** | September 6, 1907 – June 26, 1973; January 26, 1979 | University of Colorado Boulder | Boulder | Colorado | Active | (Note: 1906 Chapter formed by absorbing the Pentagon Club, established in 1906. It reformed as a colony in 1978.) |
| **Xi** | November 28, 1907 | University of Nebraska–Lincoln | Lincoln | Nebraska | Active | |
| **Omicron** | September 17, 1908 | Baker University | Baldwin City | Kansas | Active | (Note: 1890 Chapter formed by absorbing Nu Alpha, established in 1890.) |
| **Pi** | May 7, 1909 – June 26, 1973; February 5, 1978 | University of California, Berkeley | Berkeley | California | Active | (Note: Chapter formed by absorbing the local group, LaSolana, which was established in 1901. It reformed as a colony in 1976.) |
| **Rho** | October 14, 1910 | University of Washington | Seattle | Washington | Active | (Note: Chapter formed by absorbing Delta Nu, established in 1908.) |
| **Sigma** | June 13, 1911 | University of Iowa | Iowa City | Iowa | Active | (Note: Chapter formed by absorbing Sigma Tau Alpha (local), established in 1910.) |
| **Tau** | November 24, 1911 | Brenau College | Gainesville | Georgia | Active | (Note: Chapter formed by absorbing Epsilon Upsilon Gamma (local), established in 1910.) |
| **Upsilon** | May 9, 1913 | Millikin University | Decatur | Illinois | Active | (Note: Chapter formed by absorbing Phi Pi, established in 1908.) |
| **Phi** | September 15, 1914 | University of Kansas | Lawrence | Kansas | Active | (Note: Chapter formed by absorbing the local group, Blue Hawks, which was established in 1912.) |
| **Chi** | March 19, 1915 | Oregon State University | Corvallis | Oregon | Active | (Note: Chapter formed by absorbing Alpha Omega, established in 1914.) |
| **Psi** | January 14, 1916 | University of Oklahoma | Norman | Oklahoma | Active | (Note: Chapter formed by absorbing Alpha Rho, established in 1915.) |
| **Omega** | September 22, 1916 | Washington State University | Pullman | Washington | Active | (Note: Chapter formed by absorbing Alpha Theta Sigma, established in 1908.) |
| **Alpha Beta** | April 26, 1918 | Purdue University | West Lafayette | Indiana | Active | |
| **Alpha Gamma** | June 6, 1918 | University of New Mexico | Albuquerque | New Mexico | Active | (Note: Chapter formed by absorbing Alpha Omega, established in 1918.) |
| Alpha Delta | April 25, 1919 – August 10, 2001 | University of Cincinnati | Cincinnati | Ohio | Inactive | (Note: Chapter formed by absorbing Theta Phi Sigma, established in 1917.) |
| Alpha Epsilon | May 9, 1919 – June 1, 1969; March 3, 1990 – May 9, 2016 | University of Pennsylvania | Philadelphia | Pennsylvania | Inactive | (Note: Chapter formed by absorbing Zeta Chi, established in 1917. It reformed as a colony in 1989.) |
| Alpha Zeta | June 8, 1920 – June 5, 1975; October 26, 1985 – November 1, 1994 | Washington University in St. Louis | St. Louis County | Missouri | Inactive | (Note: Chapter formed by absorbing Pi Mu Alpha (local), established in 1916. It reformed as a colony in 1984.) |
| **Alpha Eta** | June 11, 1920 | University of Mount Union | Alliance | Ohio | Active | (Note: Chapter formed by absorbing Phi Delta Pi, established in 1916.) |
| Alpha Theta | June 10, 1921 – October 19, 1933 | Drake University | Des Moines | Iowa | Inactive | (Note: Chapter formed by absorbing Alpha Rho Omega, established in 1914.) |
| **Alpha Iota** | June 14, 1921 | University of Vermont | Burlington | Vermont | Active | (Note: Chapter formed by absorbing Pi Alpha Alpha, established in 1919.) |
| **Alpha Kappa** | June 22, 1921 | University of Oregon | Eugene | Oregon | Active | (Note: Chapter formed by absorbing Sigma Delta Phi, established in 1918.) |
| **Alpha Lambda** | September 30, 1921 | University of Minnesota | Minneapolis | Minnesota | Active | |
| **Alpha Mu** | April 21, 1922 | Indiana University Bloomington | Bloomington | Indiana | Active | (Note: Chapter formed by absorbing Sigma Beta Epsilon, established in 1920.) |
| **Alpha Nu** | August 25, 1922 | University of Missouri | Columbia | Missouri | Active | (Note: Chapter formed by absorbing Alpha Nu Beta, established in 1921.) |
| Alpha Xi | May 11, 1923 – June 1, 1952 | University of Montana | Missoula | Montana | Inactive | (Note: Chapter formed by absorbing the Chelys Club, established in 1921.) |
| **Alpha Omicron** | September 14, 1923 | Ohio State University | Columbus | Ohio | Active | |
| **Alpha Pi** | November 10, 1923 – May 1, 1938; February 17, 1968 | University of North Dakota | Grand Forks | North Dakota | Active | (Note: Chapter formed by absorbing Chi Delta Phi, established in 1922. It reformed as a colony in 1967.) |
| Alpha Rho | May 9, 1924 – September 9, 1988 | University of Idaho | Moscow | Idaho | Inactive | (Note: Chapter formed by absorbing Chi Beta Epsilon, established in 1923.) |
| Alpha Sigma | May 9, 1924 – February 28, 1977 | Ohio Wesleyan University | Delaware | Ohio | Inactive | (Note: Chapter formed by absorbing Alpha Lambda Iota, established in 1922.) |
| **Alpha Tau** | June 24, 1924 | University of New Hampshire | Durham | New Hampshire | Active | (Note: Chapter formed by absorbing Pi Alpha Phi, established in 1913.) |
| **Alpha Upsilon** | September 9, 1924 | University of Alabama | Tuscaloosa | Alabama | Active | |
| **Alpha Phi** | September 13, 1924 | University of Texas at Austin | Austin | Texas | Active | (Note: Chapter formed by absorbing Alpha Chi Alpha, established in 1922.) |
| **Alpha Chi** | February 28, 1925 | Butler University | Indianapolis | Indiana | Active | (Note: Chapter formed by absorbing Beta Chi, established in 1924.) |
| **Alpha Psi** | March 27, 1926 – October 3, 1996; November 14, 2009 | University of California, Los Angeles | Los Angeles | California | Active | (Note: Chapter formed by absorbing Alpha Phi Gamma, established in 1920. Reformed as a colony in 2009.) |
| Alpha Omega | April 9, 1926 – May 31, 2024 | Birmingham–Southern College | Birmingham | Alabama | Inactive | (Note: Chapter formed by absorbing Kappa Lambda, established in 1922.) |
| Beta Gamma | October 29, 1926 – April 6, 1971 | Louisiana State University | Baton Rouge | Louisiana | Inactive | (Note: Chapter formed by absorbing Zeta Sigma, established in 1922.) |
| **Beta Delta** | April 8, 1927 | College of William and Mary | Williamsburg | Virginia | Active | (Note: Chapter formed by absorbing Alpha Beta Chi, established 1926.) |
| **Beta Epsilon** | February 11, 1928 | Michigan State University | East Lansing | Michigan | Active | (Note: Chapter formed by absorbing Alpha Chi, established in 1926.) |
| Beta Zeta | November 9, 1928 – September 9, 1983 | Whitman College | Walla Walla | Washington | Inactive | (Note: Chapter was formed by absorbing Theta Chi Theta, established in 1925.) |
| **Beta Eta** | March 29, 1929 | Florida State University | Tallahassee | Florida | Active | (Note: Chapter was formed by absorbing Delta Phi, established in 1926.) |
| Beta Theta | February 20, 1930 – May 28, 1980 | Lawrence University | Appleton | Wisconsin | Inactive | (Note: Chapter formed by absorbing Alpha Gamma Phi, established in 1903.) |
| Beta Iota | April 23, 1930 – July 15, 1953 | University of Toronto | Toronto | Ontario, Canada | Inactive | (Note: Chapter was formed by absorbing Delta Sigma, established in 1928.) |
| Beta Kappa | October 23, 1930 – September 17, 1979 | University of Wyoming | Laramie | Wyoming | Inactive | (Note: Chapter was formed by absorbing Delta Theta Sigma, established in 1927.) |
| **Beta Lambda** | October 29, 1930 – July 1, 1970; February 28, 1981 – May 15, 2009; November 16, 2013 | University of Arizona | Tucson | Arizona | Active | (Note: Chapter was formed by absorbing Alpha Gamma Omicron, established in 1928. Reestablished as a colony in 1980 and 2013.) |
| Beta Mu | April 8, 1932 – March 14, 2018 | Pennsylvania State University | State College | Pennsylvania | Inactive | (Note: Chapter formed by absorbing the local group, Oread, established in 1927.) |
| **Beta Nu** | March 23, 1934 | University of Utah | Salt Lake City | Utah | Active | (Note: Chapter formed by absorbing Alpha Chi, established in 1914.) |
| **Beta Xi** | May 19, 1934 | Utah State University | Logan | Utah | Active | (Note: Chapter formed by absorbing the Sorosis Society (local), established in 1898. Predecessor group name here appears coincidental and was not connected with the similarly named predecessor to Pi Beta Phi.) |
| **Beta Omicron** | November 11, 1936 | Florida Southern College | Lakeland | Florida | Active | (Note: Chapter formed by absorbing Phi Pi Delta, established in 1925.) |
| Beta Pi | May 21, 1937 – 2024 | Washington College | Chestertown | Maryland | Inactive | (Note: Chapter formed by absorbing Kappa Gamma, established in 1928.) |
| **Beta Rho** | June 3, 1937 | American University | Washington | District of Columbia | Active | (Note: Chapter formed by absorbing Pi Chi Omicron, established in 1936.) |
| **Beta Sigma** | January 7, 1938 | University of Georgia | Athens | Georgia | Active | (Note: Chapter formed by absorbing Alpha Chi, established in 1936.) |
| **Beta Tau** | December 13, 1941 | Miami University | Oxford | Ohio | Active | (Note: Chapter formed by absorbing Beta Phi Alpha, established in 1929.) |
| Beta Upsilon | January 31, 1942 – January 22, 1976 | Duke University | Durham | North Carolina | Inactive | (Note: Chapter formed by absorbing Chi Alpha, established in 1941.) |
| **Beta Phi** | May 28, 1944 | Bowling Green State University | Bowling Green | Ohio | Active | (Note: Chapter formed by absorbing the local group, Los Amigos, established in 1929.) |
| **Beta Chi** | June 10, 1944 | Willamette University | Salem | Oregon | Active | (Note: Chapter formed by absorbing Alpha Phi Alpha, established in 1923.) |
| **Beta Psi** | October 7, 1944 | Louisiana Tech University | Ruston | Louisiana | Active | (Note: Chapter formed by absorbing Delta Chi Delta, established in 1941.) |
| **Beta Omega** | November 17, 1945 | University of Toledo | Toledo | Ohio | Active | (Note: Chapter formed by absorbing Alpha Tau Sigma, established in 1931.) |
| Gamma Delta | October 12, 1946 – October 20, 1987 | University of Denver | Denver | Colorado | Inactive | |
| **Gamma Epsilon** | March 8, 1947 | Oklahoma State University–Stillwater | Stillwater | Oklahoma | Active | |
| **Gamma Zeta** | March 22, 1947 | Kansas State University | Manhattan | Kansas | Active | |
| Gamma Eta | March 10, 1948 – May 1, 1974 | San Jose State University | San Jose | California | Inactive | (Note: Chapter formed by absorbing Beta Gamma Chi, established in 1899.) |
| **Gamma Theta** | October 30, 1948 | University of Maryland, College Park | College Park | Maryland | Active | |
| **Gamma Iota** | April 2, 1949 | University of Florida | Gainesville | Florida | Active | |
| Gamma Kappa | February 25, 1950 – November 19, 1984 | Idaho State University | Pocatello | Idaho | Inactive | |
| Gamma Lambda | April 1, 1950 – January 28, 1973 | Kent State University | Kent | Ohio | Inactive | (Note: Chapter formed by absorbing Beta Gamma, established in 1924.) |
| **Gamma Mu** | June 10, 1950 | Ball State University | Muncie | Indiana | Active | (Note: Chapter formed by absorbing the local group Alpha, established in 1920.) |
| **Gamma Nu** | November 18, 1950 | San Diego State University | San Diego | California | Active | (Note: Chapter formed by absorbing Sigma Pi Theta, established in 1924.) |
| **Gamma Xi** | April 21, 1951 | Western Michigan University | Kalamazoo | Michigan | Active | (Note: Chapter formed by absorbing the Senate Club, established in 1916.) |
| **Gamma Omicron** | November 8, 1952 | Marshall University | Huntington | West Virginia | Active | |
| **Gamma Pi** | January 20, 1954 – May 15, 1977; January 9, 1982 | University of Tampa | Tampa | Florida | Active | (Note: Chapter formed by absorbing Delta Kappa, established in 1935. It was reformed in 1982 by absorbing Alpha Omega, established in 1981.) |
| **Gamma Rho** | March 6, 1954 | Texas Tech University | Lubbock | Texas | Active | |
| **Gamma Sigma** | November 5, 1955 – October 21, 2013; 2021 | University of Rhode Island | Kingston | Rhode Island | Active | (Note: Chapter formed by absorbing Gamma Nu, established in 1952. It reformed as a colony in 2021.) |
| **Gamma Tau** | December 3, 1955 – October 7, 1978; April 9, 1988 | Oklahoma City University | Oklahoma City | Oklahoma | Active | (Note: Chapter formed by absorbing Phi Delta, established in 1907. It reformed as a colony in 1987.) |
| **Gamma Upsilon** | February 11, 1956 | University of Houston | Houston | Texas | Active | (Note: Chapter formed by absorbing Pi Delta, established in 1939.) |
| **Gamma Phi** | November 17, 1956 | Lamar University | Beaumont | Texas | Active | (Note: Chapter formed by absorbing the local group, Southern Belles, established in 1944.) |
| **Gamma Chi** | May 18, 1957 | Stetson University | DeLand | Florida | Active | |
| Gamma Psi | February 1, 1958 – April 17, 1984 | Wichita State University | Wichita | Kansas | Inactive | (Note: Chapter formed by absorbing Delta Omega, established in 1916.) |
| Gamma Omega | March 8, 1958 – June 1, 1970 | University of Miami | Coral Gables | Florida | Inactive | |
| **Delta Epsilon** | April 26, 1958 | Southeast Missouri State University | Cape Girardeau | Missouri | Active | (Note: Chapter formed by absorbing the local group, Sorosis, established in 1892. Predecessor group name here appears coincidental and was not connected with the similarly named predecessor to Pi Beta Phi.) |
| **Delta Zeta** | November 8, 1958 | Central Michigan University | Mount Pleasant | Michigan | Active | |
| Delta Eta | March 7, 1959 – June 1, 1965 | Queens University of Charlotte | Charlotte | North Carolina | Inactive | (Note: As of July 2, 2023, there is an error on Alpha Chi's national website list of chapters. Delta Eta chapter was not formed at Queens College, a unit of CCNY, but rather, at the similarly named school in Charlotte, North Carolina. The June 1959 edition of The Lyre has a profile on the new chapter. The Baird's Archive has it correctly placed.) |
| Delta Theta | April 25, 1959 – October 19, 1988 | University of Maine | Orono | Maine | Inactive | (Note: Chapter formed by absorbing Gamma Chi Alpha, established in 1957.) |
| Delta Iota | May 9, 1959 – January 29, 1988 | Emory University | Atlanta | Georgia | Inactive | (Note: Chapter formed by absorbing Alpha Sigma Delta, established in 1953.) |
| **Delta Kappa** | September 6, 1959 | Sam Houston State University | Huntsville | Texas | Active | (Note: Chapter was formed by absorbing the local Eclectic Society, established in 1882.) |
| **Delta Lambda** | October 31, 1959 | Ripon College | Ripon | Wisconsin | Active | (Note: Chapter formed by absorbing Alpha Gamma Theta, established in 1904.) |
| **Delta Mu** | February 18, 1961 | University of Massachusetts Amherst | Amherst | Massachusetts | Active | (Note: Chapter formed by absorbing Gamma Chi Alpha, established in 1958.) |
| **Delta Nu** | March 18, 1961 | Iowa State University | Ames | Iowa | Active | |
| Delta Xi | April 29, 1961 – June 1, 1969; April 12, 1986 – October 12, 2008 | Denison University | Granville | Ohio | Inactive | |
| **Delta Omicron** | May 13, 1961 | Portland State University | Portland | Oregon | Active | (Note: Chapter formed by absorbing Alpha Kappa Delta, established in 1958.) |
| **Delta Pi** | October 21, 1961 | University of Tennessee | Knoxville | Tennessee | Active | (Note: Chapter formed by absorbing Alpha Tau Sigma, established in 1931.) |
| **Delta Rho** | December 2, 1961 – May 31, 1979; November 10, 2012 | University of Arkansas | Fayetteville | Arkansas | Active | |
| Delta Sigma | March 10, 1962 – January 16, 1996 | University of the Pacific | Stockton | California | Inactive | (Note: Chapter formed by absorbing Zeta Phi, established in 1936.) |
| **Delta Tau** | April 3, 1965 | University of Minnesota, Mankato | Mankato | Minnesota | Active | (Note: Chapter formed by absorbing Phi Alpha Psi, established in 1964.) |
| Delta Upsilon | October 16, 1965 – October 13, 1998 | Colorado State University | Fort Collins | Colorado | Inactive | |
| Delta Phi | October 30, 1965 – March 9, 1978 | Texas A&M University–Kingsville | Kingsville | Texas | Inactive | (Note: Chapter formed by absorbing Zeta Chi, established in 1959.) |
| **Delta Chi** | November 20, 1965 | William Woods University | Fulton | Missouri | Active | |
| **Delta Psi** | December 4, 1965 | University of California, Santa Barbara | Santa Barbara | California | Active | |
| **Delta Omega** | March 26, 1966 – March 10, 1976; November 7, 2015 | University of Kentucky | Lexington | Kentucky | Active | |
| **Epsilon Zeta** | February 4, 1967 | Auburn University | Auburn | Alabama | Active | |
| **Epsilon Eta** | May 6, 1967 | Stephen F. Austin State University | Nacogdoches | Texas | Active | (Note: Chapter formed by absorbing the local group, Phideles, established in 1946.) |
| **Epsilon Theta** | May 20, 1967 | California State University, Sacramento | Sacramento | California | Active | (Note: Chapter formed by absorbing Beta Phi Beta, established in 1960.) |
| Epsilon Iota | March 2, 1968 – October 16, 1987 | Northern Iowa University | Cedar Falls | Iowa | Inactive | (Note: Chapter formed by absorbing Nu Sigma Phi, established in 1918.) |
| **Epsilon Kappa** | December 7, 1968 | California State University, Fullerton | Fullerton | California | Active | (Note: Chapter formed by absorbing Zeta Phi Lambda, established in 1961.) |
| **Epsilon Lambda** | February 15, 1969 | University of Texas at Arlington | Arlington | Texas | Active | (Note: Chapter formed by absorbing the local group, San Souci, established in 1923.) |
| Epsilon Mu | February 28, 1970 – May 1, 1974 | Northern Illinois University | DeKalb | Illinois | Inactive | (Note: Chapter formed by absorbing Gamma Alpha Mu, established in 1963.) |
| **Epsilon Nu** | March 7, 1970 | Boise State University | Boise | Idaho | Active | (Note: Chapter formed by absorbing the Alpha Club, established in 1968.) |
| Epsilon Xi | March 6, 1971 – August 26, 1991 | University of Nevada, Reno | Reno | Nevada | Inactive | |
| **Epsilon Omicron** | March 20, 1971 | Indiana State University | Terre Haute | Indiana | Active | |
| Epsilon Pi | February 5, 1972 – December 15, 1987 | Georgia Southwestern State University | Americus | Georgia | Inactive | |
| Epsilon Rho | February 26, 1972 – October 31, 2004 | University of Delaware | Newark | Delaware | Inactive | (Note: Chapter formed by absorbing Sigma Psi Sigma, established in 1968.) |
| Epsilon Sigma | February 10, 1973 – April 4, 1984 | University of Central Florida | Orlando | Florida | Inactive | (Note: Chapter formed by absorbing the local group, Sorosis, established in 1969. Predecessor group name here appears coincidental and was not connected with the similarly named predecessor to Pi Beta Phi.) |
| **Epsilon Tau** | March 31, 1973 – March 23, 1984; November 7, 1998 | Virginia Tech | Blacksburg | Virginia | Active | |
| **Epsilon Upsilon** | April 6, 1974 – March 23, 1984; September 18, 2021 | Mississippi State University | Starkville | Mississippi | Active | |
| **Epsilon Phi** | February 22, 1975 | Georgia Tech | Atlanta | Georgia | Active | |
| **Epsilon Chi** | January 22, 1977 | University of North Carolina at Chapel Hill | Chapel Hill | North Carolina | Active | |
| **Epsilon Psi** | January 29, 1977 | University of California, Irvine | Irvine | California | Active | |
| **Epsilon Omega** | April 15, 1978 | California Poly State University, San Luis Obispo | San Luis Obispo County | California | Active | |
| **Zeta Eta** | May 6, 1978 | Bradley University | Peoria | Illinois | Active | (Note: Chapter formed by absorbing Delta Nu, established in 1976.) |
| **Zeta Theta** | May 5, 1979 | Brown University | Providence | Rhode Island | Active | (Note: Chapter formed by absorbing Kappa Phi Omega, established in 1978.) |
| Zeta Iota | October 27, 1979 – May 1, 1982; June 3, 2017 – 2020 ? | Stanford University | Stanford | California | Inactive | |
| Zeta Kappa | November 10, 1979 – February 18, 1995 | New Mexico State University | Las Cruces | New Mexico | Inactive | |
| **Zeta Lambda** | April 19, 1980 | University of Virginia | Charlottesville | Virginia | Active | (Note: Chapter formed by absorbing the local group, Rainbow Circle, established in 1979.) |
| Zeta Mu | November 22, 1980 – March 20, 1990 | Dartmouth College | Hanover | New Hampshire | Inactive | |
| **Zeta Nu** | May 8, 1981 | Texas A&M University | College Station | Texas | Active | (Note: Chapter formed by absorbing Chi Alpha Kappa, established in 1980.) |
| **Zeta Xi** | March 20, 1982 | University of North Carolina at Greensboro | Greensboro | North Carolina | Active | |
| Zeta Omicron | April 17, 1982 – 2026 | Vanderbilt University | Nashville | Tennessee | Inactive | (Note: Chapter formed by absorbing Delta Phi Sigma, established in 1959.) |
| **Zeta Pi** | September 25, 1982 | Arizona State University | Tempe | Arizona | Active | |
| **Zeta Rho** | January 15, 1983 | Northwood University | Midland | Michigan | Active | |
| **Zeta Sigma** | April 15, 1983 | Missouri State University | Springfield | Missouri | Active | |
| **Zeta Tau** | June 25, 1983 | Villanova University | Villanova | Pennsylvania | Active | (Note: Chapter formed by absorbing Theta Gamma Epsilon, established in 1982.) |
| **Zeta Upsilon** | September 24, 1983 | Case Western Reserve University | Cleveland | Ohio | Active | |
| **Zeta Phi** | February 4, 1984 | Cornell University | Ithaca | New York | Active | |
| **Zeta Chi** | October 27, 1984 | Muhlenberg College | Allentown | Pennsylvania | Active | |
| **Zeta Psi** | November 10, 1984 | Loyola University New Orleans | New Orleans | Louisiana | Active | |
| **Zeta Omega** | April 20, 1985 | Western Carolina University | Cullowhee | North Carolina | Active | (Note: Chapter formed by absorbing Delta Pi Delta, established in 1984.) |
| **Theta Iota** | April 27, 1985 | Baylor University | Waco | Texas | Active | |
| Theta Kappa | April 27, 1985 – February 29, 1996 | University of Memphis | Memphis | Tennessee | Inactive | |
| **Theta Lambda** | October 19, 1985 | Clemson University | Clemson | South Carolina | Active | |
| Theta Mu | November 23, 1985 – February 12, 1994 | Montana State University Billings | Billings | Montana | Inactive | |
| Theta Nu | February 8, 1986 – April 6, 1993 | Santa Clara University | Santa Clara | California | Inactive | |
| Theta Xi | March 8, 1986 – October 31, 1991 | California State University, Northridge | Los Angeles | California | Inactive | |
| **Theta Omicron** | April 26, 1986 | Massachusetts Institute of Technology | Cambridge | Massachusetts | Active | (Note: Chapter formed by absorbing the local group, Thalians, established in 1985.) |
| **Theta Pi** | June 7, 1986 | University of California, Davis | Davis | California | Active | |
| Theta Rho | March 28, 1987 – April 2, 1996 | James Madison University | Harrisonburg | Virginia | Inactive | |
| **Theta Sigma** | May 2, 1987 | University of North Florida | Jacksonville | Florida | Active | |
| **Theta Tau** | February 20, 1988 – July 31, 2013; May 4, 2019 | Rutgers University–New Brunswick | New Brunswick | New Jersey | Active | |
| **Theta Upsilon** | March 26, 1988 | University of South Carolina | Columbia | South Carolina | Active | |
| Theta Phi | March 12, 1988 – February 21, 1996 | Colgate University | Hamilton | New York | Inactive | (Note: Chapter formed by absorbing Zeta Pi Delta, established in 1985.) |
| Theta Chi | February 11, 1989 – March 6, 2018 | Lehigh University | Bethlehem | Pennsylvania | Inactive | |
| **Theta Psi** | April 1, 1989 | Columbia University | New York City | New York | Active | |
| **Theta Omega** | April 15, 1989 | Marquette University | Milwaukee | Wisconsin | Active | (Note: Chapter formed by absorbing Delta Phi Xi, established in 1988.) |
| Iota Kappa | September 28, 1990 – September 1, 1993 | Eastern Kentucky University | Richmond | Kentucky | Inactive | |
| **Iota Lambda** | March 2, 1991 | Texas Christian University | Fort Worth, Texas | Texas | Active | |
| Iota Mu | April 20, 1991 – November 17, 2010 | University of Richmond | Richmond | Virginia | Inactive | |
| **Iota Nu** | May 9, 1992 | University of California, San Diego | San Diego | California | Active | |
| **Iota Xi** | May 16, 1992 | University of California, Riverside | Riverside | California | Active | |
| **Iota Omicron** | April 3, 1993 | University of Lynchburg | Lynchburg | Virginia | Active | |
| **Iota Pi** | November 18, 1993 | Houston Christian University | Houston | Texas | Active | |
| **Iota Rho** | November 20, 1993 | Loyola University | Chicago | Illinois | Active | (Note: Chapter formed by absorbing Delta Chi Omega, established in 1986.) |
| **Iota Sigma** | April 23, 1994 | Southern Methodist University | Dallas | Texas | Active | |
| **Iota Tau** | March 18, 1995 | California State University San Marcos | San Marcos | California | Active | (Note: Chapter formed by absorbing Phi Delta Delta, established in 1993.) |
| Iota Upsilon | February 22, 1996 – May 11, 2001 | Southern Illinois University Carbondale | Carbondale, Illinois | Illinois | Inactive | (Note: Chapter formed by absorbing Psi Omega Chi, established in 1994.) |
| **Iota Phi** | April 5, 1997 | Quinnipiac University | Hamden | Connecticut | Active | (Note: Chapter formed by absorbing Iota Sigma Nu, established in 1996.) |
| **Iota Chi** | April 21, 2001 | Middle Tennessee State University | Murfreesboro | Tennessee | Active | |
| **Iota Psi** | November 17, 2001 | Elon University | Elon | North Carolina | Active | |
| **Iota Omega** | April 23, 2005 | Carthage College | Kenosha | Wisconsin | Active | |
| **Kappa Lambda** | November 12, 2005 | University of San Diego | San Diego | California | Active | |
| **Kappa Mu** | April 22, 2006 | University of Texas at Tyler | Tyler | Texas | Active | |
| **Kappa Nu** | April 29, 2006 | Carnegie Mellon University | Pittsburgh | Pennsylvania | Active | (Note: Chapter formed by absorbing Zeta Psi Sigma, established in 1993.) |
| **Kappa Xi** | November 11, 2007 | University of West Florida | Pensacola | Florida | Active | |
| **Kappa Omicron** | March 30, 2012 | High Point University | High Point | North Carolina | Active | |
| **Kappa Pi** | November 17, 2012 | University of North Carolina Wilmington | Wilmington | North Carolina | Active | |
| **Kappa Rho** | November 15, 2014 | University of North Carolina at Charlotte | Charlotte | North Carolina | Active | |
| **Kappa Sigma** | November 15, 2014 | University of Southern Mississippi | Hattiesburg | Mississippi | Active | |
| **Kappa Tau** | November 15, 2014 | University of Connecticut | Storrs | Connecticut | Active | |
| **Kappa Upsilon** | December 6, 2014 | Florida International University | Miami | Florida | Active | |
| **Kappa Phi** | April 18, 2015 | Loyola Marymount University | Los Angeles | California | Active | |
| **Kappa Chi** | November 7, 2015 | Florida Gulf Coast University | Fort Myers | Florida | Active | |
| Kappa Psi | March 12, 2016 – 20xx ? | Western Oregon University | Monmouth | Oregon | Inactive | |
| **Kappa Omega** | April 2, 2016 | Indiana University Indianapolis | Indianapolis | Indiana | Active | |
| **Lambda Mu** | November 4, 2017 | Trinity College | Hartford | Connecticut | Active | |
| **Lambda Nu** | April 6, 2019 | Northeastern University | Boston | Massachusetts | Active | |
| **Lambda Xi** | November 16, 2019 | Augusta University | Augusta | Georgia | Active | |
| **Lambda Omicron** | April 8, 2022 | Chapman University | Orange | California | Active | |
| **Lambda Pi** | October 29, 2022 | University of Mississippi | Oxford | Mississippi | Active | |

== See also ==
- List of Alpha Chi Omega members
