= Audra Levi =

American actress and singer

- Years active: 1983–present

Audra Levi, also known as Audra Lee, is an American actress, singer, producer, and writer.

== Early life and education ==
Audra Levi's musical path began when her grandmother Estelle Karp taught her how to sing at 3 years old. She mainly focused on musical theater and opera throughout grade school, then expanded to pop/rock music in college.

Levi has worked in television since the 1980s. She became a child star in a daily educational segment called Kid's Beat from 1983 until 1987, which aired twice daily on TBS. The one-minute long segments were typically seen during cartoon series airing on the network, as well as episodes of The Three Stooges and kid-oriented TV series such as The Brady Bunch and Rocky Road, depending on the time of day.

Levi also had the privilege of studying vocal performance with Robert Ray (Atlanta) and John Hall (Los Angeles) throughout the 1990s.

Before graduating from high school in Atlanta, Levi was named MVP (most valuable player) in one of the first Grammy High School Jazz Bands in 1993.

As a freshman at UCLA, Levi was selected as a solo competitor in the school's prestigious Spring Sing competition in Spring 1994. During that same time period, she also performed as the "Witch" in UCLA's production of "Into the Woods".

At the University of Southern California, Levi was a co-founder of the SoCal VoCals in January 1996, and can be heard as a soloist on the a-cappella group's debut CD that was released in 1997 ("Total Eclipse of the Heart"). Levi choreographed the SoCal VoCals' first place-winning entry in USC's Songfest in 1997.

Since 2000, Levi has been an active member of the Academy of Television Arts & Sciences (ATAS), serving on ATAS Foundation's New Leadership Council since 2005 and has previously served on the Interactive Media Peer Group's Executive Committee in year 2011.

Levi is an initiate of Alpha Chi Omega and an active volunteer on a local and national level. She was initiated at the Alpha Psi chapter at UCLA, and an affiliated member of the Epsilon chapter at USC. In 2022, the Alpha Chi Omega National Council selected Audra to receive the Outstanding Dedication Award for her 20+ years of service to the Fraternity.

In 2002, the Los Angeles Area Alumnae Panhellenic Association (LAAPA) awarded Levi with their "Woman of the Year" award for her ongoing volunteer involvement with Alpha Chi Omega. The award was established by the LAAPA in 1973, and at the time, Levi was the youngest alumna ever selected to receive the honor.

Levi holds a Bachelor of Arts degree in Cinema-Television Production from the University of Southern California’s School of Cinema-Television.

== Career ==
=== Music ===
More than a decade later, Levi dove into songwriting, and her debut EP called "I'm All In" showcases her melodic and heartfelt writing style on four songs. The EP was produced by Michael Getches and released in August 2012 via iTunes, Amazon and other digital distribution outlets.

Levi released a self-produced debut album called "I'm All In" on August 7, 2012 via iTunes and Amazon. Original songs include "I'm All In", "One Moment More", "It Seems Like Yesterday" and "Just For Now". A fifth original called "Blueberry Eyes" was written by Jason Reid. This album has been distributed on all major audio streaming platforms.

Levi and her band (Tommy Reeves, Maria Martinez and Ron Suffradini) made their Southern Californian debut on June 1, 2 and 3, 2012 as a featured performer at The Home Entertainment Show in Irvine, where more than 10,000 music-loving fans gathered for this annual convention focused on high-end audio and live performances. Levi and Reeves returned to THE Show in 2013 for three additional performances. Levi was also invited to perform with the legendary Mike Garson on June 1, 2013 on THE Show's main stage. Audra continued performing at THE Show in 2014, 2015 and 2016 with Tommy Reeves on piano.

In October 2022, Audra released her second album "Hopeless Romantic", produced by Billy Mitchell, and recorded at Private Island Studios in Los Angeles, CA, in April and May 2022. Original songs include "Magnolia Girl", "Come Back to Me" and "Paris". A fourth original called "Give It Time" was written by Jason Reid. This album will be distributed on all major audio streaming platforms.

=== Acting ===
Between the 1990s and 2000s, Levi began her television production career working behind the scenes on several Emmy-winning programs such as Mad About You, JAG, The King of Queens and The Young and the Restless.

Later in her career, Levi conducted television program syndication sales for Warner Bros. Domestic Television Distribution in the Western Region, including The People’s Court, The Ellen DeGeneres Show, Extra and Friends. Previously, she worked at 20th Television as their television program syndication sales trainee and research analyst, responsible for daily tracking and trending analysis for shows including Divorce Court, The Practice, Cops, Buffy the Vampire Slayer and Malcolm in the Middle.

Levi currently serves as SVP, Business Development at the SmithGeiger Group.

== Personal life ==
Levi currently lives in Los Angeles, CA, with husband Jason, son Justin and son Garrett.

== Filmography ==
=== Actress ===
- Kid's Beat (1983-1987)
- Tom & Jerry Halloween Special (1987)
- Tom & Jerry Thanksgiving Special (1987)
- Tom & Jerry Christmas Special (1987)
- Tom & Jerry School's Out Special (1988)
- Tom & Jerry Back to School Special (1988)
- Kids Incorporated (2 appearances; 1988, 1989)

=== Production staff ===
- Mad About You (1992)
- JAG (1995)
- Arli$$ (1996)
- Gattaca (1997)
- The King of Queens (1999-2000)
- The Young and the Restless (2000)

=== Writer ===
- Kid's Beat (1987-1993)
