= Ronda Carman =

American writer

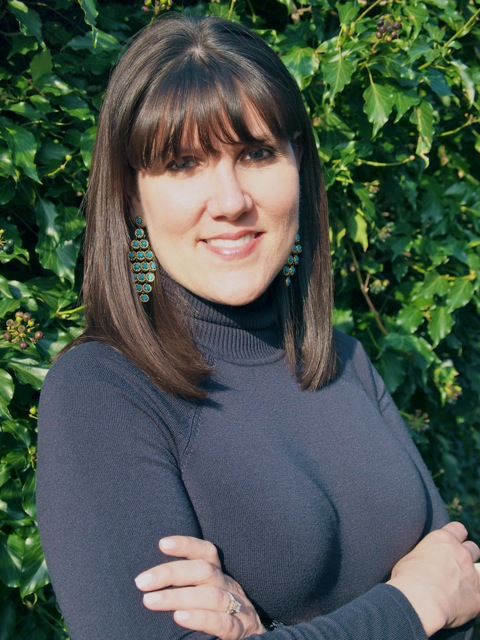
Ronda Carman (2012)

Ronda Rice Carman is an American writer and founder of All the Best blog, a Rizzoli author, and founder of Ronda Carman Fine Fabrics. All the Best was named as one of ten top design blogs in 2010 Fox News Carman is a former contributing writer for New York Social Diary and the Huffington Post. Her first book Designers At Home: Personal Reflections on Stylish Living was named by Amazon as one of the Best Interior Design Books for 2013. In early 2014 Ronda started her own luxury fabric line, Ronda Carman Fine Fabrics.

== Personal life ==
Ronda Carman was born on April 20, 1970, in Houston, Texas. She graduated in 1988 from William P. Clements High School in Sugar Land, Texas. She attended Sam Houston State University and the University of Houston. She is a member of Alpha Chi Omega sorority. In 1993 she married Christopher Carman, a university professor with whom she and Chris have a daughter, Amy Carman. In 2005 Carman and her family moved to Scotland. In 2007 she founded All the Best Blog (ATB). Ronda now lives in Houston with her second husband and business partner, Matt Whitaker.

== Press ==
Ronda has garnered press around the globe, including FOX News, Elle Decor, House Beautiful, Domino Magazine, Southern Living, Real Simple, RUE, Home Plus Scotland and numerous regional, national and international newspapers. In 2019 Ronda was named to the Salonniere 100, a list of America's Best Party Hosts.

== Publishing ==
Ronda is a Rizzoli author. Her books include Designers at Home: Personal Reflections on Stylish Living and Entertaining at Home: Inspirations from Celebrated Hosts. The Art of Pantry Cooking was released in March 2022. Upcoming books include Lynn Wyatt: A Wonderful Life (2024) and At Home for the Holidays (2025).

She a former contributor to Huffington Post, New York Social Diary and a reviewer for Mr. & Mrs. Smith Hotel Collections
