= Texas French Symposium =

- Abbreviation: TFS
- Formation: 1964
- Founder: Dee Moynihan
- Type: Non-profit
- Location(s): 24111 Ardwick Court, Tomball Texas 77375
- Region served: Texas
- Board of directors: Susan Dworaczyk, President; Meriem Mason, Vice President; Terri Whiteman, Vice President/Host School Coordinator; Amanda Crépin, Secretary; Karen Watson, Treasurer
- Website: www.texasfrenchsymposium.org

The Texas French Symposium is a statewide non-profit competition in which French students, which are categorized into levels 1-6 and Experienced compete with other students of their same level from all over the state of Texas. The organization is hosted annually at a random participating high school in Texas who volunteers to host. The contest is held on a spring weekend and lasts two days. It begins with tests in the late afternoon of the first day and lasts until 21:00. The competition resumes on the next day at 8:30 and is closed with a ceremony that includes dinner and awards.
