= Kid's Beat =

- Starring: (Partial list); Corri English; RonReaco Lee; Johntá Austin; Audra Lee; Valerie Vanis
- Country of origin: United States

Production
- Camera setup: Single-camera
- Running time: 1 min.

Original release
- Network: TBS
- Release: 1983 – 1997

Kid's Beat is a series of one- to two-minute televised news segments that summarized topics such as sports, education and current events for children and preteens. Likened to CBS's In the News feature, the segments were hosted by children. They were broadcast in the United States on TBS from 1983 until the mid-1990s, between weekday afternoon children's animated cartoon programs.

== Cancellation ==
In 1997, Kid's Beat was cancelled and replaced by Feed Your Mind, a TBS-produced children's newsmagazine featuring stories reported by kids on a range of topics. Many were former hosts of Kid's Beat, including Johnta Austin and Corri English.
